= 2006–07 Russian Cup =

Tournament details
- Country: Russia

Final positions
- Champions: Lokomotiv Moscow
- Runners-up: FC Moscow

The 2006–07 Russian Cup was the 15th edition of the Russian football knockout tournament since the dissolution of Soviet Union. The competition started on 13 April 2006 and finished on 27 May 2007, with the final played at the Luzhniki Stadium in Moscow, where Lokomotiv Moscow beat FC Moscow with 1–0 after extra time.

== Preliminary round ==
South

13 April 2006	Spartak Vladikavkaz	2–0	Dynamo Stavropol	Vladikavkaz
	Bogatikov 80'; Bazayev 89'			Stadium: Republican Spartak Stadium; Attendance: 9,000

Center

22 April 2006	Nika Moscow	4–0	Saturn Yegoryevsk	Moscow
	Malinin 22' 27'; Sargis Avagyan 40'; Zakharov 75'			Attendance: 200

22 April 2006	FC Yelets	2–0	Dynamo Voronezh	Yelets
	Nosikov 5'; Sereda 71' (pen.)			Attendance: 2,800

West

29 April 2006	Volochanin-Ratmir Vyshny Volochyok	0–0 (a.e.t.) (4–2 p)	Volga Tver	Vyshny Volochyok
				Stadium: Spartak Stadium; Attendance: 2,000

29 April 2006	Sheksna Cherepovets	0–2	Spartak Kostroma	Cherepovets
			Grigory Gnedov 8', 48'	Stadium: Metallurg Stadium; Attendance: 1,300

29 April 2006	FC Smolensk	2–1	Arsenal Tula	Smolensk
	Markov 13', 39'		Fomichov 3'	Stadium: Spartak Stadium; Attendance: 1,700

== First round ==
South

26 April 2006	Rotor Volgograd	3–1	Tekstilshchik Kamyshin	Volgograd
	Ishchenko 32'; Veretennikov 48'; Sergei Kudrin 63'		Solodovnikov 54'	Stadium: Central Stadium; Attendance: 900

26 April 2006	Sudostroitel Astrakhan	1–2	Olimpia Volgograd	Astrakhan
	Sergei Sukhov 23'		Mikhalyov 6'; Myazin 27'	Stadium: Astrakhan Stadium; Attendance: 500

26 April 2006	FC Elista	2–0	Dagdizel Kaspiysk	Elista
	Sanal Gavrilov 16'; Sergei Maltsev 55'			Stadium: Uralan Stadium; Attendance: 2,500

26 April 2006	Avtodor Vladikavkaz	2–4	Spartak Vladikavkaz	Vladikavkaz
	Kasayev 77' (pen.); Aslanbek Kibirov 85'		Dubrovin 4', 60', 78'; Alborov 32'	Stadium: Tedeyev SOK Stadium; Attendance: 7,600

26 April 2006	SKA Rostov-on-Don	2–3	FC Taganrog	Rostov-on-Don
	Chernyshov 12' (pen.); Timashov 42'		Krivokon 21'; Tretyakov 45' (pen.); Alborov 32'	Stadium: SKA SKVO Stadium; Attendance: 1,500

26 April 2006	Kavkaztransgaz-2005 Ryzdvyany	1–1 (a.e.t.) (1–3 p)	Krasnodar-2000	Stavropol
	Nafash 95' (pen.)		Shovgenov 104'	Stadium: Dynamo Stadium; Attendance: 1,000

26 April 2006	Spartak-UGP Anapa	1–1 (a.e.t.) (5–4 p)	Chernomorets Novorossiysk	Anapa
	Paunezhev 90'		Lange 78'	Stadium: Vityazevo Stadium; Attendance: 2,500

26 April 2006	Sochi-04	0–0 (a.e.t.) (2–4 p)	Druzhba Maykop	Sochi
				Stadium: Central Stadium; Attendance: 200

East

30 April 2006	Kuzbass-Dinamo Kemerovo	1–2	Zarya Leninsk-Kuznetsky	Kemerovo
	Novosyolov 45'		Selivanov 40'; Vashurin 75'	Stadium: Shakhtyor Stadium; Attendance: 500

30 April 2006	Irtysh-1946 Omsk	1–0	Chkalovets Novosibirsk	Omsk
	Pantyukhin 84'			Stadium: Red Star Stadium; Attendance: 1,000

30 April 2006	Shakhtyor Prokopyevsk	1–0	Dynamo Barnaul	Prokopyevsk
	Sitdikov 84'			Stadium: Shakhtyor Stadium; Attendance: 3,000

30 April 2006	Sibiryak Bratsk	0–1	FC Chita	Bratsk
			Gavryush 11'	Stadium: Metallurg Stadium; Attendance: 4,000

30 April 2006	Okean Nakhodka	4–3 (a.e.t.)	Smena Komsomolsk-na-Amure	Nakhodka
	Lodis 11'; Shpiryuk 69'; Ivchenko 80'; Aleksandr Rusinov 104'		Dimidko 64'; Shmonin 75' (pen.); Roman Malakhov 88'	Stadium: Vodnik Stadium; Attendance: 1,200

Center

3 May 2006	Don Novomoskovsk	0–2	Spartak Lukhovitsy	Novomoskovsk
			Lopatkin 30' (pen.), 73'	Stadium: Khimik Stadium; Attendance: 500

3 May 2006	Zvezda Serpukhov	2–1 (a.e.t.)	Lokomotiv Kaluga	Serpukhov
	Safin 37'; Kuznetsov 100' (pen.)		Yevgeni Bondar 89'	Stadium: Trud Stadium; Attendance: 2,000

3 May 2006	Lobnya-Alla	2–1	Vityaz Podolsk	Lobnya
	Vekovishchev 55' (pen.); Fedoseyev 87'		Mikheyev 16'	Stadium: Moskvich Stadium; Attendance: 1,000

3 May 2006	Ryazan-Agrokomplekt	2–0 (a.e.t.)	Nika Moscow	Ryazan
	Aleksei Rodin 102' (pen.); Shkapov 115'			Stadium: CSK Stadium; Attendance: 2,000

3 May 2006	Spartak-MZhK Ryazan	3–0	Spartak Tambov	Ryazan
	Frolov 9'; Parshikov 60' (o.g.); Milovanov 90'			Stadium: CSK Stadium; Attendance: 1,500

3 May 2006	Lokomotiv Liski	3–1	FC Gubkin	Liski
	Zhdanov 76', 89'; Faustov 85'		Fedotov 34'	Stadium: Lokomotiv Stadium; Attendance: 2,800

3 May 2006	Mordovia Saransk	2–1 (a.e.t.)	Zenit Penza	Saransk
	Ryabykh 19'; Snimshchikov 113'		Dmitry Antonov 7'	Stadium: Start Stadium; Attendance: 4,500

3 May 2006	Metallurg Lipetsk	3–0	FC Yelets	Lipetsk
	Strukov 29', 53'; Chikunov 82'			Stadium: Metallurg Stadium; Attendance: 4,500

Ural-Povolzhye

3 May 2006	Alnas Almetyevsk	2–0	Neftekhimik Nizhnekamsk	Almetyevsk
	Pimenov 51'; Vasilenko 90'			Stadium: Alnas Stadium; Attendance: 3,000

3 May 2006	Energetik Uren	0–2	Dynamo Kirov	Uren
			Sherstnyov 55', 71'	Stadium: Energetik Stadium; Attendance: 1,300

3 May 2006	Volga Nizhny Novgorod	2–0	Krylia Sovetov-SOK Dimitrovgrad	Nizhny Novgorod
	Shakhov 45'; Pavlovskiy 65'			Stadium: Lokomotiv Stadium; Attendance: 2,000

3 May 2006	Yunit Samara	0–0 (a.e.t.) (4–2 p)	Gazovik Orenburg	Samara
				Stadium: Volga Stadium; Attendance: 1,900

3 May 2006	FC Tyumen	2–0	Krylia Sovetov-SOK Dimitrovgrad	Tyumen
	Fishman 45' (pen.); Petukhov 69'			Stadium: Geolog Stadium; Attendance: 2,000

3 May 2006	Zenit Chelyabinsk	1–3 (a.e.t.)	SOYUZ-Gazprom Izhevsk	Chelyabinsk
	Khanov 78' (pen.)		Pashkin 43'; Nikitin 98'; Khabibullin 102' (pen.)	Stadium: Central Stadium; Attendance: 1,500

West

18 May 2006	Petrotrest Saint Petersburg	0–2	Volochanin-Ratmir Vyshny Volochyok	Saint Petersburg
			Yagodkin 75'; Zhelatin 80'	Stadium: Dynamo Stadium; Attendance: 300

18 May 2006	Zenit-2 Saint Petersburg	1–1 (a.e.t.) (4–2 p)	Baltika-2 Kaliningrad	Saint Petersburg
	Trofimov 58'		Derevyanko 39'	Stadium: Petrovsky Stadium; Attendance: 300

18 May 2006	Spartak Kostroma	2–3	Dynamo Vologda	Kostroma
	Grigory Gnedov 41'; Suanov 59' (pen.)		Parnyakov 17'; Andrei Opanasyuk 18'; Kalinin 39' (pen.)	Stadium: Urozhay Stadium; Attendance: 1,500

18 May 2006	Fortuna Mytishchi	2–1	Torpedo-RG Moscow	Mytishchi
	Chigrov 22'; Chudin 25' (pen.)		Ilya Chizhikov 43'	Attendance: 400

18 May 2006	Torpedo Vladimir	3–0	FC Smolensk	Vladimir
	Andrei Smirnov 39', 60'; Malyshev 72'			Stadium: Torpedo Stadium; Attendance: 5,500

18 May 2006	Sportakademklub Moscow	0–0 (a.e.t.) (7–6 p)	Spartak Shchyolkovo	Moscow
				Stadium: FOP Izmaylovo Stadium; Attendance: 500

18 May 2006	FC Reutov	2–0	Presnya Moscow	Reutov
	Kurov 37'; Yeremeyev 78' (pen.)			Stadium: Start Stadium; Attendance: 300

18 May 2006	Nara-Desna Naro-Fominsk	2–0	Tekstilshchik-Telekom Ivanovo	Naro-Fominsk
	Baranov 20' (pen.); Uzoikin 75'			Stadium: Nara Stadium; Attendance: 500

== Second round ==
South

10 May 2006	Olimpia Volgograd	2–1	Rotor Volgograd	Volgograd
	Mikhalyov 23', 54'		Eduard Shapovalov 44'	Stadium: Olimpia Stadium; Attendance: 2,000

10 May 2006	Spartak Vladikavkaz	3–0	FC Elista	Vladikavkaz
	Alborov 17'; Viktor Svistunov 58'; Agafonov 88'			Stadium: Republican Spartak Stadium; Attendance: 6,000

10 May 2006	FC Taganrog	0–1	Krasnodar-2000	Taganrog
			Mirny 67'	Stadium: Torpedo Stadium; Attendance: 900

10 May 2006	Druzhba Maykop	3–3 (a.e.t.) (0–2 p)	Spartak-UGP Anapa	Maykop
	Mikhail Surshkov 26', 48'; Jamirzov 119'		Aleksandrov 41'; Garmash 82' (pen.); Zekokh 103'	Stadium: Stadium Yunost; Attendance: 1,400

East

11 May 2006	Zarya Leninsk-Kuznetsky	0–1	Metallurg-Kuzbass Novokuznetsk	Leninsk-Kuznetsky
			Nedozerov 81'	Stadium: Shakhtyor Stadium; Attendance: 4,500

11 May 2006	Shakhtyor Prokopyevsk	1–2 (a.e.t.)	Irtysh-1946 Omsk	Prokopyevsk
	Puchkov 23'		Pantyukhin 47'; Novikov 110'	Stadium: Shakhtyor Stadium; Attendance: 2,500

11 May 2006	FC Chita	1–0	Zvezda Irkutsk	Chita
	Zakharenkov 57'			Stadium: Lokomotiv Stadium; Attendance: 3,700

11 May 2006	Amur Blagoveshchensk	0–0 (a.e.t.) (7–6 p)	Okean Nakhodka	Blagoveshchensk
				Stadium: Amur Stadium; Attendance: 2,000

Center

14 May 2006	Spartak Lukhovitsy	1–0 (a.e.t.)	Zvezda Serpukhov	Lukhovitsy
	Lopatkin 109'			Stadium: Spartak Stadium; Attendance: 500

14 May 2006	Ryazan-Agrokomplekt	0–1	Lobnya-Alla	Ryazan
			Kocharygin 89'	Stadium: CSK Stadium; Attendance: 2,000

14 May 2006	Lokomotiv Liski	1–1 (a.e.t.) (3–4 p)	Spartak-MZhK Ryazan	Liski
	Malakhov 60'		Pankov 35'	Stadium: Lokomotiv Stadium; Attendance: 2,800

14 May 2006	Mordovia Saransk	2–1	Metallurg Lipetsk	Saransk
	Mineyev 53', 82'		Strukov 71'	Stadium: Start Stadium; Attendance: 3,000

Ural-Povolzhye

18 May 2006	Rubin-2 Kazan	0–1	Alnas Almetyevsk	Kazan
			Adrshin 56'	Stadium: Rubin Stadium; Attendance: 100

18 May 2006	Dynamo Kirov	1–1 (a.e.t.) (8–7 p)	Volga Nizhny Novgorod	Kirov
	Zaikin 65' (pen.)		Shakhov 4'	Stadium: Dinamo Stadium; Attendance: 1,500

18 May 2006	Nosta Novotroitsk	0–0 (a.e.t.) (3–2 p)	Yunit Samara	Novotroitsk
				Stadium: Metallurg Stadium; Attendance: 3,750

18 May 2006	SOYUZ-Gazprom Izhevsk	3–0	FC Tyumen	Izhevsk
	Ronzhin 14', 38'; Khayrullin 88'			Stadium: Central Stadium; Attendance: 250

West

29 May 2006	Volochanin-Ratmir Vyshny Volochyok	0–1	Zenit-2 Saint Petersburg	Vyshny Volochyok
			Markelov 77'	Stadium: Spartak Stadium; Attendance: 1,000

29 May 2006	Dynamo Vologda	3–1	Fortuna Mytishchi	Vologda
	Kalinin 46'; Lukinskiy 82'; Anton Proshin 89'		Yegorov 24'	Stadium: Dynamo Stadium; Attendance: 1,500

29 May 2006	Sportakademklub Moscow	0–2	Torpedo Vladimir	Moscow
			Vyazmikin 38'; Kriulin 68'	Stadium: FOP Izmaylovo Stadium; Attendance: 300

29 May 2006	FC Reutov	0–3	Nara-Desna Naro-Fominsk	Reutov
			Baranov 28'; Sachkov 42', 47'	Stadium: Start Stadium; Attendance: 200

== Third round ==
East

31 May 2006	Metallurg-Kuzbass Novokuznetsk	3–1	Irtysh-1946 Omsk	Novokuznetsk
	Voronkov 16'; Kobyalko 47' (pen.); Yegunov 90'		Sukovatitsin 45'	Stadium: Metallurg Stadium; Attendance: 1,500

31 May 2006	FC Chita	3–1	Amur Blagoveshchensk	Chita
	Nagibin 58'; Smyshlyaev 64', 67'; Yegunov 90'		Khapsayev 53' (pen.)	Stadium: Lokomotiv Stadium; Attendance: 2,200

Ural-Povolzhye

2 June 2006	Dynamo Kirov	1–1 (a.e.t.) (5–3 p)	Alnas Almetyevsk	Kirov
	Tyufyakov 61'		Dobrovolskiy 50'	Stadium: Dinamo Stadium; Attendance: 2,000

2 June 2006	SOYUZ-Gazprom Izhevsk	1–3	Nosta Novotroitsk	Izhevsk
	Arsen Tsidayev 81' (pen.)		Pavlov 5'; Yemelyanov 84'; Nizamutdinov 90'	Stadium: Central Stadium; Attendance: 1,100

Center

4 June 2006	Spartak Lukhovitsy	1–1 (a.e.t.) (3–5 p)	Lobnya-Alla	Lukhovitsy
	Yevgeny Levandovsky 68'		Artyomov 39'	Stadium: Spartak Stadium; Attendance: 1,100

4 June 2006	Spartak-MZhK Ryazan	1–1 (a.e.t.) (3–4 p)	Mordovia Saransk	Ryazan
	Kubrak 42'		Kurochkin 39'	Stadium: CSK Stadium; Attendance: 1,500

South

5 June 2006	Olimpia Volgograd	3–2	Spartak Vladikavkaz	Volgograd
	Roman Arkatov 15'; Golovlyov 49'; Chernov 90' (pen.)		Viktor Svistunov 23'; Ailarov 90+1'	Stadium: Olimpia Stadium; Attendance: 1,200

5 June 2006	Krasnodar-2000	2–4	Spartak-UGP Anapa	Krasnodar
	Boyarintsev 45'; Muldarov 83'		Georgi Stafionov 4'; Skachkov 36'; Jenia 55', 57'	Stadium: Trud Stadium; Attendance: 300

West

8 June 2006	Zenit-2 Saint Petersburg	3–0	Dynamo Vologda	Saint Petersburg
	Pershin 15'; Klass 46', 65'			Stadium: Petrovsky Stadium; Attendance: 300

8 June 2006	Torpedo Vladimir	1–0	Nara-Desna Naro-Fominsk	Vladimir
	Vyazmikin 15'			Stadium: Torpedo Stadium; Attendance: 6,000

== Fourth round ==
21 June 2006	Zenit-2 Saint Petersburg	2–2 (a.e.t.) (4–2 p)	Torpedo Vladimir	Saint Petersburg
	Sapin 21'; Klass 45'		Malyshev 19'; Vyazmikin 84'	Stadium: Kirov Stadium; Attendance: 500

21 June 2006	FC Khimki	3–2	Baltika Kaliningrad	Khimki
	Dragičević 20', 70'; Mashkarin 45'		Kagazezhev 3'; Zec 26'	Stadium: Rodina Stadium; Attendance: 1,500

21 June 2006	Fakel Voronezh	2–0	FC Oryol	Voronezh
	Gridnev 21'; Dzhioyev 88'			Stadium: Trade Unions Central Stadium; Attendance: 4,000

21 June 2006	Lobnya-Alla	0–1	Dynamo Bryansk	Lobnya
			Usikov 18'	Stadium: Moskvich Stadium; Attendance: 500

21 June 2006	Mordovia Saransk	2–0	Avangard Kursk	Saransk
	Snimshchikov 50'; Kurochkin 70'			Stadium: Start Stadium; Attendance: 4,000

21 June 2006	Salyut-Energiya Belgorod	0–1	Kuban Krasnodar	Belgorod
			Rebrov 27'	Stadium: Salyut Stadium; Attendance: 10,500

21 June 2006	Spartak-UGP Anapa	3–5	Terek Grozny	Anapa
	Zhenus 61'; Paunezhev 68'; Babenko 78' (pen.)		Budunov 20'; Atangana 22', 37', 40'; Sırxayev 74' (pen.)	Stadium: Vityazevo Stadium; Attendance: 3,000

21 June 2006	Mashuk-KMV Pyatigorsk	1–2	Angusht Nazran	Pyatigorsk
	Prus 66'		Zangiyev 33'; Daurbekov 77'	Stadium: Central Stadium; Attendance: 1,800

21 June 2006	Anzhi Makhachkala	2–0	Volgar-Gazprom Astrakhan	Kaspiysk
	Antipenko 48'; Magomedov 80'			Stadium: Anzhi Arena; Attendance: 2,500

21 June 2006	Olimpia Volgograd	1–4	Dynamo Makhachkala	Volgograd
	Yegor Levin 90'		Pinchuk 36'; Sadirov 44'; Gomlenko 54'; Agalarov 79'	Stadium: Olimpia Stadium; Attendance: 1,000

21 June 2006	Spartak Nizhny Novgorod	1–0	KAMAZ Naberezhnye Chelny	Nizhny Novgorod
	Samodin 48'			Stadium: Lokomotiv Stadium; Attendance: 500

21 June 2006	Dynamo Kirov	2–0	Lada-Tolyatti	Kirov
	Sherstnyov 42'; Pronin 80'			Stadium: Dinamo Stadium; Attendance: 3,000

21 June 2006	Nosta Novotroitsk	1–2	Ural Yekaterinburg	Novotroitsk
	Zelenovskiy 50'		Mysin 47'; Radkevich 52'	Stadium: Metallurg Stadium; Attendance: 3,500

21 June 2006	Sibir Novosibirsk	2–0	Sodovik Sterlitamak	Novosibirsk
	Sergiyenko 6'; Akimov 90' (pen.)			Stadium: Spartak Stadium; Attendance: 5,000

21 June 2006	FC Chita	0–0 (a.e.t.) (3–0 p)	Metallurg-Kuzbass Novokuznetsk	Chita
				Stadium: Lokomotiv Stadium; Attendance: 3,800

21 June 2006	Metallurg Krasnoyarsk	1–0	SKA-Energia Khabarovsk	Krasnoyarsk
	Guskov 59'			Stadium: Central Stadium; Attendance: 1,500

== Round of 32 ==
Team 1	Agg.	Team 2	1st leg	2nd leg
Zenit-2 Saint Petersburg	0–5	Rubin Kazan	0–3	0–2
Fakel Voronezh	1–3	Torpedo Moscow	0–0	1–3
FC Khimki	1–2	FC Rostov	0–2	1–0
Dynamo Bryansk	3–3 (a)	Shinnik Yaroslavl	2–0	1–3
CSKA Moscow	4–1	Mordovia Saransk	4–0	0–1
Krylia Sovetov Samara	5–1	Kuban Krasnodar	1–1	1–4
Terek Grozny	4–5	FC Moscow	4–1	0–4
Amkar Perm	5–1	Angusht Nazran	3–0	2–1
Lokomotiv Moscow	5–3	Anzhi Makhachkala	4–2	1–1
Dynamo Makhachkala	4–3	Luch-Energiya Vladivostok	4–0	0–3
Spartak Nizhny Novgorod	1–5	Dynamo Moscow	1–3	0–2
Dynamo Kirov	1–6	Tom Tomsk	0–4	1–2
Ural Yekaterinburg	2–3	Spartak Moscow	0–1	2–2
Spartak Nalchik	1–3	Sibir Novosibirsk	1–1	0–2
FC Chita	2–4	Zenit Saint Petersburg	1–2	1–2
Saturn Moskovskaya Oblast	6–2	Metallurg Krasnoyarsk	4–1	2–1

=== First leg ===
2 July 2006	Zenit-2 Saint Petersburg	0–3	Rubin Kazan	Saint Petersburg
			Domínguez 29', 77'; Scotti 59'	Stadium: Kirov Stadium; Attendance: 2,500; Referee: Eduard Malyi

2 July 2006	Fakel Voronezh	0–0	Torpedo Moscow	Voronezh
				Stadium: Trade Unions Central Stadium; Attendance: 9,000; Referee: Yuri Kunitsa

2 July 2006	FC Khimki	0–2	FC Rostov	Khimki
			Burmistrov 50', 62'	Stadium: Novye Khimki Stadium; Attendance: 2,500; Referee: Aleksandr Kabakov

2 July 2006	Dynamo Bryansk	2–0	Shinnik Yaroslavl	Bryansk
	Junior Santos 5', 40'			Stadium: Dynamo Stadium; Attendance: 6,000; Referee: Denis Kozmin

2 July 2006	CSKA Moscow	4–0	Mordovia Saransk	Moscow
	Daniel Carvalho 19'; Jô 25' (pen.), 62'; Vágner Love 90+1'			Stadium: Central Dynamo Stadium; Attendance: 3,500; Referee: Vladimir Kazmenko

2 July 2006	Krylia Sovetov Samara	1–1	Kuban Krasnodar	Samara
	Șoavă 16' (pen.)		Ivanov 57' (pen.)	Stadium: Metallurg Stadium; Attendance: 9,000; Referee: Aleksei Nikolaev

2 July 2006	Terek Grozny	4–1	FC Moscow	Pyatigorsk
	Budunov 12', 29' (pen.); Atangana 46'; Sırxayev 81'		Danilin 84'	Stadium: Central Stadium; Attendance: 2,800; Referee: Vladimir Pettay

2 July 2006	Amkar Perm	3–0	Angusht Nazran	Perm
	Kushev 27'; Shcherbakov 37', 40'			Stadium: Zvezda Stadium; Attendance: 4,000; Referee: Oleg Kuzmenko

2 July 2006	Lokomotiv Moscow	4–2	Anzhi Makhachkala	Moscow
	Loskov 20', 23' (pen.); Antipenko 29' (o.g.); Sychev 90+1'		Mamayev 43'; Lakhiyalov 73'	Stadium: Lokomotiv Stadium; Attendance: 4,500; Referee: Mikhail Semyonov

2 July 2006	Dynamo Makhachkala	4–0	Luch-Energiya Vladivostok	Makhachkala
	Stolbovoy 10'; Imrekov 27'; Pinchuk 31'; Agalarov 34' (pen.)			Stadium: Dynamo Stadium; Attendance: 3,000; Referee: Igor Egorov

2 July 2006	Spartak Nizhny Novgorod	1–3	Dynamo Moscow	Nizhny Novgorod
	Skoblyakov 83'		Derlei 38'; Fernández 73'; Bulykin 90'	Stadium: Lokomotiv Stadium; Attendance: 5,000; Referee: Ildus Biglov

2 July 2006	Dynamo Kirov	0–4	Tom Tomsk	Kirov
			Vejić 42'; Krunić 70', 74'; Pogrebnyak 90'	Stadium: Dinamo Stadium; Attendance: 7,000; Referee: Dmitri Popov

2 July 2006	Ural Yekaterinburg	0–1	Spartak Moscow	Yekaterinburg
			Pavlenko 70'	Stadium: Uralamash Stadium; Attendance: 13,000; Referee: Aleksandr Evstigneev

2 July 2006	Spartak Nalchik	1–1	Sibir Novosibirsk	Nalchik
	Serdyukov 72'		Zhuravlyov 35' (pen.)	Stadium: Spartak Stadium; Attendance: 10,000; Referee: Mikhail Veselovski

2 July 2006	FC Chita	1–2	Zenit Saint Petersburg	Chita
	Zakharenkov 6'		Maksimov 80'; Vlasov 85'	Stadium: Lokomotiv Stadium; Attendance: 8,700; Referee: Sergei Marushko

2 July 2006	Saturn Moskovskaya Oblast	4–1	Metallurg Krasnoyarsk	Ramenskoye
	Vukčević 25' (pen.); Ďurica 47'; Eremenko 51'; Yesipov 89'		Komkov 53'	Stadium: Saturn Stadium; Attendance: 5,000; Referee: Vyacheslav Trushin

=== Second leg ===
9 September 2006	Rubin Kazan	2–0 (5–0 agg.)	Zenit-2 Saint Petersburg	Kazan
	Benachour 4'; Yarkin 78'			Stadium: Central Stadium; Attendance: 2,500; Referee: Aleksei Sergeyev

19 September 2006	Torpedo Moscow	3–1 (3–1 agg.)	Fakel Voronezh	Moscow
	Golubov 56'; Jokić 87'; Piechna 90'		Jääger 62' (o.g.)	Stadium: Luzhniki Stadium; Attendance: 700; Referee: Sergei Marushko

20 September 2006	FC Rostov	0–1 (2–1 agg.)	FC Khimki	Rostov-on-Don
			Yevstafyev 41'	Stadium: SKA SKVO Stadium; Attendance: 1,500; Referee: Maksim Layushkin

20 September 2006	Shinnik Yaroslavl	3–1 (3–3 (a) agg.)	Dynamo Bryansk	Yaroslavl
	Bouli 14'; Bakoš 19' (pen.), 90' (pen.)		Kostić 47'	Stadium: Shinnik Stadium; Attendance: 2,000; Referee: Vitali Doroshenko

20 September 2006	Mordovia Saransk	1–0 (1–4 agg.)	CSKA Moscow	Saransk
	Sysuyev 24'			Stadium: Svetotekhnika Stadium; Attendance: 13,500; Referee: Radik Akhmadullin

20 September 2006	Kuban Krasnodar	1–4 (1–5 agg.)	Krylia Sovetov Samara	Krasnodar
	Zemchenkov 30'		Gadzhiyev 40', 71'; Medvedev 58'; Adamu 74'	Stadium: Kuban Stadium; Attendance: 17,000; Referee: Alexei Kovalev

20 September 2006	FC Moscow	4–0 (5–4 agg.)	Terek Grozny	Moscow
	Barrientos 8'; Kirichenko 14', 39'; Bystrov 78'			Stadium: Eduard Streltsov Stadium; Attendance: 3,500; Referee: Stanislav Sukhina

20 September 2006	Angusht Nazran	1–2 (1–5 agg.)	Amkar Perm	Nazran
	Geliskhanov 78'		Paramonov 25'; Savin 76'	Stadium: Rashid Aushev Central Stadium; Attendance: 1,200; Referee: Yuri Kunitsa

20 September 2006	Anzhi Makhachkala	1–1 (2–4 agg.)	Lokomotiv Moscow	Makhachkala
	Kébé 43'		Maminov 48'	Stadium: Dynamo Stadium; Attendance: 8,500; Referee: Eduard Malyi

20 September 2006	Luch-Energiya Vladivostok	3–0 (3–4 agg.)	Dynamo Makhachkala	Vladivostok
	Kazakov 43' (pen.); Sheshukov 47'; Ospeshinskiy 86'			Stadium: Dynamo Stadium; Attendance: 7,000; Referee: Mikhail Veselovski

20 September 2006	Dynamo Moscow	2–0 (5–1 agg.)	Spartak Nizhny Novgorod	Moscow
	Cícero 14', 90'			Stadium: Central Dynamo Stadium; Attendance: 3,000; Referee: Denis Kozmin

20 September 2006	Tom Tomsk	2–1 (6–1 agg.)	Dynamo Kirov	Tomsk
	Tarasov 44'; Krunić 50'		Simonov 60'	Stadium: Trud Stadium; Attendance: 6,000; Referee: Aleksandr Kabakov

20 September 2006	Spartak Moscow	2–2 (3–2 agg.)	Ural Yekaterinburg	Moscow
	Bystrov 90'; Boyarintsev 90+3'		Fidler 46'; Mysin 69'	Stadium: Luzhniki Stadium; Attendance: 3,400; Referee: Aleksandr Gvardis

20 September 2006	Sibir Novosibirsk	2–0 (3–1 agg.)	Spartak Nalchik	Novosibirsk
	Olynytskyi 54'; Shvoren 61' (o.g.)			Stadium: Spartak Stadium; Attendance: 7,500; Referee: Aleksandr Evstigneev

20 September 2006	Zenit Saint Petersburg	2–1 (4–2 agg.)	FC Chita	Saint Petersburg
	Radimov 29'; Panov 44'		Kreisman 43' (pen.)	Stadium: Petrovsky Stadium; Attendance: 9,000; Referee: Sergei Timofeyev

20 September 2006	Metallurg Krasnoyarsk	1–2 (2–6 agg.)	Saturn Moskovskaya Oblast	Krasnoyarsk
	Goncharov 47'		Yesipov 20'; Bareiro 79'	Stadium: Central Stadium; Attendance: 4,000; Referee: Dmitri Popov

== Round of 16 ==
Team 1	Agg.	Team 2	1st leg	2nd leg
Dynamo Makhachkala	– (Note: Dynamo Makhachkala was denied a professional licence, therefore the team was eliminated, thus Lokomotiv Moscow advances to the next round.)	Lokomotiv Moscow	–	–
CSKA Moscow	0–2	Krylia Sovetov Samara	0–0	0–2
Spartak Moscow	4–1	Sibir Novosibirsk	1–0	3–1
FC Moscow	6–2	Amkar Perm	3–0	3–2
FC Rostov	4–1	Rubin Kazan	3–1	1–0
Torpedo Moscow	0–1	Dynamo Bryansk	0–1	0–0
Zenit Saint Petersburg	2–1	Saturn Moskovskaya Oblast	1–0	1–1
Dynamo Moscow	2–1	Tom Tomsk	2–0	0–1

=== First leg ===
18 February 2007	CSKA Moscow	0–0	Krylia Sovetov Samara	Vladikavkaz
				Stadium: Republican Spartak Stadium; Attendance: 5,000; Referee: Aleksandr Evstigneev

18 February 2007	Spartak Moscow	1–0	Sibir Novosibirsk	Moscow
	Boyarintsev 20'			Stadium: Luzhniki Stadium; Attendance: 5,000; Referee: Aleksandr Gonchar

26 February 2007	FC Moscow	3–0	Amkar Perm	Moscow
	Barrientos 55'; Krunić 81'; Bystrov 88'			Stadium: Central Dynamo Stadium; Attendance: 800; Referee: Igor Egorov

4 March 2007	FC Rostov	3–1	Rubin Kazan	Rostov-on-Don
	Noboa 15' (o.g.); Dantsev 35'; Bochkov 66'		Gabriel Atz 17'	Stadium: Olimp-2; Attendance: 7,500; Referee: Aleksandr Kolobaev

4 March 2007	Torpedo Moscow	0–1	Dynamo Bryansk	Moscow
			Malin 17'	Stadium: Luzhniki Stadium; Attendance: 3,500; Referee: Vladislav Bezborodov

4 March 2007	Zenit Saint Petersburg	1–0	Saturn Moskovskaya Oblast	Saint Petersburg
	Tekke 2'			Stadium: Petrovsky Stadium; Attendance: 19,000; Referee: Eduard Malyi

4 March 2007	Dynamo Moscow	2–0	Tom Tomsk	Moscow
	Danny Alves 28'; Pimenov 80'			Stadium: Central Dynamo Stadium; Attendance: 3,500; Referee: Nikolai Ivanov

=== Second leg ===
26 February 2007	Krylia Sovetov Samara	2–0 (2–0 agg.)	CSKA Moscow	Moscow
	Topić 18'; Bobyor 83'			Stadium: Luzhniki Stadium; Attendance: 1,350; Referee: Stanislav Sukhina

26 February 2007	Sibir Novosibirsk	1–3 (1–4 agg.)	Spartak Moscow	Novosibirsk
	Sharin 18'		Boyarintsev 55'; Dzyuba 72'; Titov 76'	Stadium: Spartak Stadium; Attendance: 7,200; Referee: Sergei Timofeyev

4 March 2007	Amkar Perm	2–3 (2–6 agg.)	FC Moscow	Perm
	Savin 19', 28'		Semak 15'; Bracamonte 24'; Barrientos 66'	Stadium: Zvezda Stadium; Attendance: 9,200; Referee: Yuri Klyuchnikov

7 March 2007	Rubin Kazan	0–1 (1–4 agg.)	FC Rostov	Vladikavkaz
			Osinov 27' (pen.)	Stadium: Republican Spartak Stadium; Attendance: 4,000; Referee: Valentin Ivanov

7 March 2007	Dynamo Bryansk	0–0 (1–0 agg.)	Torpedo Moscow	Bryansk
				Stadium: Dynamo Stadium; Attendance: 8,000; Referee: Yuri Kunitsa

14 March 2007	Saturn Moskovskaya Oblast	1–1 (1–2 agg.)	Zenit Saint Petersburg	Ramenskoye
	Gyan 48'		Horshkov 69'	Stadium: Saturn Stadium; Attendance: 11,870; Referee: Aleksandr Gvardis

14 March 2007	Tom Tomsk	1–0 (1–2 agg.)	Dynamo Moscow	Tomsk
	Lebedkov 33'			Stadium: Trud Stadium; Attendance: 6,000; Referee: Yuri Klyuchnikov

== Quarter-finals ==
Team 1	Agg.	Team 2	1st leg	2nd leg
FC Rostov	1–2	Dynamo Bryansk	1–2	0–0
FC Moscow	5–2	Krylia Sovetov Samara	3–2	2–0
Dynamo Moscow	1–4	Lokomotiv Moscow	1–0	0–4
Zenit Saint Petersburg	2–3	Spartak Moscow	1–2	1–1

=== First leg ===
4 April 2007	FC Rostov	1–2	Dynamo Bryansk	Rostov-on-Don
	Osinov 81'		Fomichyov 43'; Bouli 45'	Stadium: Olimp-2; Attendance: 4,500; Referee: Maksim Layushkin

4 April 2007	FC Moscow	3–2	Krylia Sovetov Samara	Moscow
	Adamov 20'; Krunić 84'; Barrientos 90+3'		Godunok 26' (o.g.); Bobyor 84' (pen.)	Stadium: Eduard Streltsov Stadium; Attendance: 2,000; Referee: Aleksandr Gonchar

4 April 2007	Dynamo Moscow	1–0	Lokomotiv Moscow	Moscow
	Khokhlov 50'			Stadium: Central Dynamo Stadium; Attendance: 8,000; Referee: Igor Zakharov

4 April 2007	Zenit Saint Petersburg	1–2	Spartak Moscow	Saint Petersburg
	Pogrebnyak 71'		Mozart 45' (pen.); Dzyuba 69'	Stadium: Petrovsky Stadium; Attendance: 18,000; Referee: Aleksandr Gvardis

=== Second leg ===
18 April 2007	Dynamo Bryansk	0–0 (2–1 agg.)	FC Rostov	Bryansk
				Stadium: Dynamo Stadium; Attendance: 10,000; Referee: Aleksandr Kolobaev

18 April 2007	Krylia Sovetov Samara	0–2 (2–5 agg.)	FC Moscow	Samara
			Hubník 35'; Bracamonte 87'	Stadium: Metallurg Stadium; Attendance: 11,000; Referee: Eduard Malyi

18 April 2007	Lokomotiv Moscow	4–0 (4–1 agg.)	Dynamo Moscow	Moscow
	Bilyaletdinov 9'; Sychev 41', 51'; O'Connor 86'			Stadium: Lokomotiv Stadium; Attendance: 10,616; Referee: Aleksandr Evstigneev

18 April 2007	Spartak Moscow	1–1 (3–2 agg.)	Zenit Saint Petersburg	Moscow
	Prudnikov 17'		Pogrebnyak 52'	Stadium: Luzhniki Stadium; Attendance: 35,000; Referee: Stanislav Sukhina

== Semi-finals ==
Team 1	Agg.	Team 2	1st leg	2nd leg
Dynamo Bryansk	1–2	FC Moscow	1–1	0–1
Lokomotiv Moscow	5–1	Spartak Moscow	3–0	2–1

=== First leg ===
2 May 2007	Dynamo Bryansk	1–1	FC Moscow	Bryansk
	Bouli 56'		Semak 35'	Stadium: Dynamo Stadium; Attendance: 10,100; Referee: Aleksandr Evstigneev

2 May 2007	Lokomotiv Moscow	3–0	Spartak Moscow	Moscow
	Sychev 2'; O'Connor 42'; Bilyaletdinov 45'			Stadium: Lokomotiv Stadium; Attendance: 23,723; Referee: Aleksei Nikolaev

=== Second leg ===
8 May 2007	FC Moscow	1–0 (2–1 agg.)	Dynamo Bryansk	Moscow
				Stadium: Eduard Streltsov Stadium; Attendance: 4,000; Referee: Nikolai Ivanov

9 May 2007	Spartak Moscow	1–2 (1–5 agg.)	Lokomotiv Moscow	Moscow
	Boyarintsev 53'		Cociș 71'; Sychev 88'	Stadium: Luzhniki Stadium; Attendance: 15,000; Referee: Valentin Ivanov

== Final ==
The final took place on 27 May 2007 at the Luzhniki Stadium in Moscow.

27 May 2007
14:00 UTC+3

FC Moscow	0–1 (a.e.t.)	Lokomotiv Moscow
	Report	O'Connor 102'

Luzhniki Stadium, Moscow
Attendance: 50,000
Referee: Yuri Baskakov

== Top goalscorers ==
Rank	Player	Club	Goals
1	(Bosnia and Herzegovina) Branislav Krunić	FC Moscow	5
1	(Russia) Dmitri Sychev	Lokomotiv Moscow	5
3	(Russia) Denis Boyarintsev	Spartak Moscow	4
3	(Argentina) Pablo Barrientos	FC Moscow	4
5	(Russia) Pavel Pogrebnyak	Zenit Saint Petersburg	3
5	(Scotland) Garry O'Connor	Lokomotiv Moscow	3
5	(Cameroon) Jean Bouli	Dynamo Bryansk	3
5	(Russia) Yevgeny Savin	Amkar Perm	3
