= 2008 in Russian football =

2008 season

The Russian Premier League schedule of competitions and cups from 2008.

== Overview ==
- 2008 Russian Super Cup was held on 9 March at the Luzhniki Stadium, Moscow. Zenit St. Petersburg won the trophy for the first time, beating Lokomotiv Moscow 2–1.
- 2008 Russian Premier League started on 14 March.
- The final of Russian Cup was held on 11 May at the Lokomotiv Stadium, Moscow. CSKA Moscow won the trophy for the fourth time, becoming the second most successful club to win the Cup, after Lokomotiv Moscow's 5 titles.
- Zenit St. Petersburg became the second Russian club to win the UEFA Cup, defeating Rangers 2–0 in the final on 14 May.
- Russia, along with Turkey, won bronze medals at Euro 2008, having been defeated in the semi-finals 0–3 and 2–3 by Spain and Germany, respectively.
- Zenit St. Petersburg became the first Russian club to win UEFA Super Cup, defeating Manchester United 2–1 in the match on 29 August.
- Russia started their 2010 FIFA World Cup qualifying campaign on 10 September with a home 2–1 win over Wales.
- Rubin Kazan won the Russian Premier League on 2 November (27th matchday), defeating Saturn Moscow Oblast away 2–1 to claim their first title.

== National team ==
Date	Venue	Opponents	Score^{1}	Comp.	Russia scorers	Match Report
26 March	Stadionul Ghencea, Bucharest (A)	Romania	0–3	F		UEFA.com
23 May	Lokomotiv Stadium, Moscow (H)	Kazakhstan	6–0	F	Pavel Pogrebnyak, Vladimir Bystrov, Konstantin Zyryanov, Diniyar Bilyaletdinov, Dmitri Torbinski, Dmitri Sychev	UEFA.com
28 May	Wacker Arena, Burghausen, Germany (N)	Serbia	2–1	F	Pavel Pogrebnyak, Roman Pavlyuchenko	UEFA.com
4 June	Wacker Arena, Burghausen, Germany (N)	Lithuania	4–1	F	Konstantin Zyryanov, Andrei Arshavin, Roman Pavlyuchenko, Vladimir Bystrov	UEFA.com
10 June	Tivoli-Neu Stadion, Innsbruck, Austria (N)	Spain	1–4	EURO	Roman Pavlyuchenko	UEFA.com
14 June	Wals Siezenheim Stadium, Salzburg, Austria (N)	Greece	1–0	EURO	Konstantin Zyryanov	UEFA.com
18 June	Tivoli-Neu Stadion, Innsbruck, Austria (N)	Sweden	2–0	EURO	Roman Pavlyuchenko, Andrei Arshavin	UEFA.com
21 June	St. Jakob-Park, Basel, Switzerland (N)	Netherlands	3–1	EURO	Roman Pavlyuchenko, Dmitri Torbinski, Andrei Arshavin	UEFA.com
26 June	Ernst Happel Stadion, Vienna, Austria (N)	Spain	0–3	EURO		UEFA.com
20 August	Lokomotiv Stadium, Moscow (H)	Netherlands	1–1	F	Konstantin Zyryanov	ESPNsoccernet.com
10 September	Lokomotiv Stadium, Moscow (H)	Wales	2–1	WCQ	Roman Pavlyuchenko, Pavel Pogrebnyak	FIFA.com
11 October	Westfalenstadion, Dortmund (A)	Germany	1–2	WCQ	Andrei Arshavin	FIFA.com
15 October	Lokomotiv Stadium, Moscow (H)	Finland	3–0	WCQ	Petri Pasanen (o.g.), Veli Lampi (o.g.), Andrei Arshavin	FIFA.com

1. Russia score given first

Key

- H = Home match
- A = Away match
- N = Match on neutral ground
- F = Friendly
- EURO = UEFA Euro 2008
- WCQ = 2010 FIFA World Cup qualifying

== Leagues ==
=== Premier League ===
Pos	Team	Pld	W	D	L	GF	GA	GD	Pts	Qualification or relegation
1	Rubin Kazan (C)	30	18	6	6	44	26	+18	60	Qualification to Champions League group stage
2	CSKA Moscow	30	16	8	6	53	24	+29	56	Qualification to Champions League group stage
3	Dynamo Moscow	30	15	9	6	41	29	+12	54	Qualification to Champions League third qualifying round
4	Amkar Perm	30	14	9	7	31	22	+9	51	Qualification to Europa League play-off round
5	Zenit St. Petersburg	30	12	12	6	59	37	+22	48 (Note: Zenit St. Petersburg ahead of Krylia Sovetov on head-to-head points; Zenit St. Petersburg–Krylia Sovetov 1–1, Krylia Sovetov–Zenit St. Petersburg 0–3.)	Qualification to Europa League play-off round
6	Krylia Sovetov Samara	30	12	12	6	46	28	+18	48	Qualification to Europa League third qualifying round (Note: Since both finalists of the 2008–09 Russian Cup qualified for the 2009–10 UEFA Champions League, Krylia Sovetov earned a spot in the third qualifying round of the 2009–10 UEFA Europa League.)
7	Lokomotiv Moscow	30	13	8	9	37	32	+5	47	
8	Spartak Moscow	30	11	11	8	43	39	+4	44	
9	FC Moscow	30	9	11	10	34	36	−2	38	
10	Terek Grozny	30	9	8	13	28	42	−14	35	
11	Saturn	30	7	12	11	26	30	−4	33	
12	Spartak Nalchik	30	8	8	14	30	39	−9	32	
13	Tom Tomsk	30	7	8	15	23	39	−16	29	
14	Khimki	30	6	9	15	34	54	−20	27	
15	Shinnik Yaroslavl (R)	30	5	7	18	25	48	−23	22	Relegation to First Division
16	Luch-Energiya Vladivostok (R)	30	3	12	15	24	53	−29	21	Relegation to First Division

Source: RFPL (in Russian)
Rules for classification: 1st points; 2nd matches won; 3rd head-to-head (points, matches won, goal difference, goals scored, away goals scored); 4th goal difference; 5th goals scored; 6th away goals scored; 7th position in previous season or decision game
(C) Champions; (R) Relegated

=== First Division ===
Pos	Team	Pld	W	D	L	GF	GA	GD	Pts	Promotion or relegation
1	Rostov (P)	42	29	9	4	78	29	+49	96	Promotion to Premier League
2	Kuban Krasnodar (P)	42	27	6	9	84	36	+48	87	Promotion to Premier League
3	KAMAZ Naberezhnye Chelny	42	23	10	9	68	41	+27	79	
4	Ural Sverdlovsk Oblast	42	22	9	11	69	39	+30	75	
5	Nosta Novotroitsk	42	20	13	9	59	37	+22	73	
6	Anzhi Makhachkala	42	20	12	10	63	35	+28	72	
7	Baltika Kaliningrad	42	17	14	11	43	34	+9	65	
8	SKA-Khabarovsk	42	17	10	15	63	60	+3	61	
9	Chernomorets Novorossiysk	42	16	13	13	51	38	+13	61	
10	Alania Vladikavkaz	42	17	8	17	50	47	+3	59	
11	Vityaz Podolsk	42	17	7	18	49	57	−8	58 (Note: Head-to-head record: Salyut-Energia – Vityaz 0–2, Vityaz – Salyut-Energia 1–0.)	
12	Salyut-Energia Belgorod	42	17	7	18	51	51	0	58	
13	SKA Rostov-on-Don	42	15	13	14	52	50	+2	58	
14	Sibir Novosibirsk	42	14	16	12	51	41	+10	58	
15	Sportakademklub Moscow	42	16	9	17	55	57	−2	57	
16	Metallurg-Kuzbass Novokuznetsk (R)	42	14	15	13	44	42	+2	57	Relegation to Second Division
17	Volga Ulyanovsk (R)	42	15	4	23	50	65	−15	49	Relegation to Second Division
18	Torpedo Moscow (R)	42	14	7	21	47	69	−22	49	Relegation to Second Division
19	Mashuk-KMV Pyatigorsk (R)	42	8	8	26	39	79	−40	32	Relegation to Second Division
20	Dynamo Barnaul (R)	42	6	9	27	31	80	−49	27	Relegation to Second Division
21	Dynamo Bryansk (R)	42	6	4	32	30	81	−51	22	Relegation to Second Division
22	Zvezda Irkutsk (Note: Zvezda Irkutsk deducted 18 points for failing to pay for player transfers.) (R)	42	8	5	29	36	95	−59	11	Relegation to Second Division

Source: PFL, Soccerway
Rules for classification: 1st points; 2nd matches won; 3rd head-to-head (points, matches won, goal difference, goals scored, away goals scored); 4th goal difference; 5th goals scored; 6th away goals scored
(P) Promoted; (R) Relegated

=== Second Division ===
West
Pos	Team	Pld	Pts
1	Volgar-Gazprom-2 Astrakhan (C, P)	34	83
2	Bataysk-2007	34	76
3	Krasnodar (P)	34	72
4	Olimpia Volgograd	34	71
5	Dynamo Stavropol	34	59
6	Zhemchuzhina-Sochi	34	54
7	Dagdizel Kaspiysk	34	46
8	Kavkaztransgaz-2005 Ryzdvyany	34	44
9	Energiya Volzhsky	34	42
10	Druzhba Maykop	34	42
11	Nika Krasny Sulin	34	36
12	Taganrog	34	36
13	Rotor Volgograd	34	35
14	Sudostroitel Astrakhan	34	33
15	Krasnodar-2000	34	33
16	Sochi-04	34	32
17	Spartak-UGP Anapa	34	30
18	Avtodor Vladikavkaz	34	30

Source: PFL
(C) Champions; (P) Promoted

West
Pos	Team	Pld	Pts
1	MVD Rossii Moscow (C, P)	36	79
2	Torpedo Vladimir	36	79
3	Sheksna Cherepovets	36	68
4	Spartak Kostroma	36	66
5	Volga Tver	36	56
6	Sever Murmansk	36	56
7	Dynamo St. Petersburg	36	53
8	Dmitrov	36	49
9	Reutov	36	48
10	Pskov-747 Pskov	36	47
11	Spartak Shchyolkovo	36	46
12	Zelenograd	36	44
13	Volochanin-Ratmir Vyshny Volochyok	36	40
14	Torpedo-RG Moscow	36	39
15	Istra	36	39
16	Dynamo Vologda	36	39
17	Nara-ShBFR Naro-Fominsk	36	36
18	Tekstilshchik Ivanovo	36	34
19	Zenit-2 St. Petersburg (R)	36	24

Source: PFL
(C) Champions; (P) Promoted; (R) Relegated

Center
Pos	Team	Pld	Pts
1	Volgar-Gazprom-2 Astrakhan (C, P)	34	83
2	Bataysk-2007	34	76
3	Krasnodar (P)	34	72
4	Olimpia Volgograd	34	71
5	Dynamo Stavropol	34	59
6	Zhemchuzhina-Sochi	34	54
7	Dagdizel Kaspiysk	34	46
8	Kavkaztransgaz-2005 Ryzdvyany	34	44
9	Energiya Volzhsky	34	42
10	Druzhba Maykop	34	42
11	Nika Krasny Sulin	34	36
12	Taganrog	34	36
13	Rotor Volgograd	34	35
14	Sudostroitel Astrakhan	34	33
15	Krasnodar-2000	34	33
16	Sochi-04	34	32
17	Spartak-UGP Anapa	34	30
18	Avtodor Vladikavkaz	34	30

Source: PFL
(C) Champions; (P) Promoted

Center
Pos	Team	Pld	Pts
1	Metallurg Lipetsk (C, P)	34	76
2	Avangard Kursk	34	75
3	Lukhovitsy	34	67
4	Gubkin	34	67
5	Zvezda Serpukhov	34	65
6	Dynamo-Voronezh	34	62
7	Mordovia Saransk	34	56
8	Ryazan	34	47
9	Yelets	34	46
10	Zenit Penza	34	43
11	Lokomotiv Liski	34	42
12	Spartak Tambov	34	38
13	Rusichi Oryol	34	38
14	Zodiak Stary Oskol	34	32
15	Saturn Moscow Oblast	34	31
16	Znamya Truda Orekhovo-Zuyevo	34	29
17	Nika Moscow	34	23
18	FCS-73 Voronezh (R)	34	18

Source: PFL
(C) Champions; (P) Promoted; (R) Relegated

South
Pos	Team	Pld	Pts
1	Volgar-Gazprom-2 Astrakhan (C, P)	34	83
2	Bataysk-2007	34	76
3	Krasnodar (P)	34	72
4	Olimpia Volgograd	34	71
5	Dynamo Stavropol	34	59
6	Zhemchuzhina-Sochi	34	54
7	Dagdizel Kaspiysk	34	46
8	Kavkaztransgaz-2005 Ryzdvyany	34	44
9	Energiya Volzhsky	34	42
10	Druzhba Maykop	34	42
11	Nika Krasny Sulin	34	36
12	Taganrog	34	36
13	Rotor Volgograd	34	35
14	Sudostroitel Astrakhan	34	33
15	Krasnodar-2000	34	33
16	Sochi-04	34	32
17	Spartak-UGP Anapa	34	30
18	Avtodor Vladikavkaz	34	30

Source: PFL
(C) Champions; (P) Promoted

Ural-Povolzhye
Pos	Team	Pld	Pts
1	Volgar-Gazprom-2 Astrakhan (C, P)	34	83
2	Bataysk-2007	34	76
3	Krasnodar (P)	34	72
4	Olimpia Volgograd	34	71
5	Dynamo Stavropol	34	59
6	Zhemchuzhina-Sochi	34	54
7	Dagdizel Kaspiysk	34	46
8	Kavkaztransgaz-2005 Ryzdvyany	34	44
9	Energiya Volzhsky	34	42
10	Druzhba Maykop	34	42
11	Nika Krasny Sulin	34	36
12	Taganrog	34	36
13	Rotor Volgograd	34	35
14	Sudostroitel Astrakhan	34	33
15	Krasnodar-2000	34	33
16	Sochi-04	34	32
17	Spartak-UGP Anapa	34	30
18	Avtodor Vladikavkaz	34	30

Source: PFL
(C) Champions; (P) Promoted

Ural-Povolzhye
Pos	Team	Pld	Pts
1	Volga Nizhny Novgorod (C, P)	34	78
2	Gazovik Orenburg	34	71
3	Nizhny Novgorod (P)	34	69
4	Gornyak Uchaly	34	60
5	Lada-Togliatti	34	57
6	Khimik Dzerzhinsk	34	57
7	Zenit Chelyabinsk	34	55
8	Togliatti	34	54
9	Rubin-2 Kazan	34	53
10	Tyumen	34	50
11	SOYUZ-Gazprom Izhevsk	34	45
12	Sokol-Saratov	34	41
13	Alnas Almetyevsk	34	40
14	Neftekhimik Nizhnekamsk	34	38
15	Dynamo Kirov	34	37
16	Energetik Uren	34	35
17	Yunit Samara	34	8
18	Akademiya Dimitrovgrad	34	3

Source: PFL
(C) Champions; (P) Promoted

East
Pos	Team	Pld	Pts
1	Volgar-Gazprom-2 Astrakhan (C, P)	34	83
2	Bataysk-2007	34	76
3	Krasnodar (P)	34	72
4	Olimpia Volgograd	34	71
5	Dynamo Stavropol	34	59
6	Zhemchuzhina-Sochi	34	54
7	Dagdizel Kaspiysk	34	46
8	Kavkaztransgaz-2005 Ryzdvyany	34	44
9	Energiya Volzhsky	34	42
10	Druzhba Maykop	34	42
11	Nika Krasny Sulin	34	36
12	Taganrog	34	36
13	Rotor Volgograd	34	35
14	Sudostroitel Astrakhan	34	33
15	Krasnodar-2000	34	33
16	Sochi-04	34	32
17	Spartak-UGP Anapa	34	30
18	Avtodor Vladikavkaz	34	30

Source: PFL
(C) Champions; (P) Promoted

East
Pos	Team	Pld	Pts
1	Chita (C, P)	27	60
2	Smena Komsomolsk-na-Amure	27	54
3	Irtysh-1946 Omsk	27	49
4	Sibir-2 Novosibirsk	27	40
5	Sibiryak Bratsk	27	35
6	Metallurg Krasnoyarsk	27	34
7	Okean Nakhodka	27	34
8	KUZBASS Kemerovo	27	25
9	Amur Blagoveshchensk	27	25
10	Sakhalin Yuzhno-Sakhalinsk	27	15

Source: PFL
(C) Champions; (P) Promoted

== Cups ==
=== 2007–08 Russian Cup ===
==== Quarterfinals ====
Team #1	Score	Team #2
CSKA Moscow	2–1	Spartak Nalchik
Zenit	0–0 (3–4p)	Tom
Amkar	2–1	Moskva
Ural Sverdlovsk Oblast	2–1	Saturn

==== Semifinals ====
Team #1	Score	Team #2
CSKA Moscow	2–1	Tom
Amkar	1–0	Ural Sverdlovsk Oblast

==== Final ====
17 May 2008
15:00 MSD

CSKA Moscow	2 – 2 (a.e.t.)	Amkar Perm
Vágner Love 65'; Jô 75'		Drinčić 57'; Dujmović 64'
Penalties
Zhirkov (penalty scored); Vágner Love (penalty scored); Jô (penalty scored); Janczyk (penalty scored)	4–1	(penalty missed) Drinčić; (penalty scored) Kushev; (penalty missed) Dujmović

Lokomotiv Stadium, Moscow
Attendance: 24,000
Referee: Sukhina (Malakhovka)

=== 2008 Russian Super Cup ===
Russian Super Cup 2008 was the 6th Russian Super Cup match, which was contested between the 2007 Russian Premier League champion, Zenit St. Petersburg, and the winner of 2006–07 Russian Cup, Lokomotiv Moscow.

9 March 2008
16:00 MSK

Zenit St. Petersburg	2 – 1	Lokomotiv Moscow
Arshavin 34'; Pogrebnyak 82'	(Report)	Rodolfo 69'

Luzhniki Stadium, Moscow
Attendance: 48,000
Referee: Baskakov (Moscow)
