= 2005–06 Russian Cup =

Tournament details
- Country: Russia

Final positions
- Champions: CSKA Moscow
- Runners-up: Spartak Moscow

The 2005–06 Russian Cup was the 14th season of the Russian football knockout tournament since the dissolution of Soviet Union.

The tournament was won by CSKA Moscow who beat Spartak Moscow in the final with 3–0.

== Preliminary round ==
Team 1	Score	Team 2
17 April 2005
Sodovik Sterlitamak	0–0 (a.e.t.) (4–3 p)	Metallurg-Metisnik Magnitogorsk
Saturn Naberezhnye Chelny	0–1	Lada-SOK Dimitrovgrad
Lokomotiv Nizhny Novgorod	0–0 (a.e.t.) (0–3 p)	Volga Nizhny Novgorod

== First round ==
Team 1	Score	Team 2
20 April 2005
Tekstilshchik Kamyshin	0–2	Torpedo Volzhsky
Sudostroitel Astrakhan	1–2	Rotor-2 Volgograd
FC Sochi-04	2–3 (a.e.t.)	Druzhba Maykop
SKA Rostov-on-Don	0–0 (a.e.t.) (7–6 p)	FC Krasnodar-2000
Avtodor Vladikavkaz	1–1 (a.e.t.) (2–4 p)	Angusht Nazran
22 April 2005
Lokomotiv-M Serpukhov	1–1 (a.e.t.) (4–5 p)	Lokomotiv Kaluga
Volga Tver	1–0	Volochanin-Ratmir VV
Torpedo Vladimir	1–0	Tekstilshchik-Telekom Ivanovo
Sportakademklub Moscow	0–2	Spartak Kostroma
Spartak-MZhK Ryazan	0–3	Ryazan-Agrokomplekt
Spartak Tambov	2–1	Iskra Engels
Spartak Shchyolkovo	1–0	FC Reutov
Spartak Lukhovitsy	0–2	Saturn Yegoryevsk
Shakhtyor Prokopyevsk	1–2 (a.e.t.)	Zarya Leninsk-Kuznetsky
Salyut-Energiya Belgorod	1–2	Lokomotiv Liski
Nika Moscow	2–0	Titan Moscow
Nara-Desna Naro-Fominsk	2–2 (a.e.t.) (4–5 p)	Presnya Moscow
Mordovia Saransk	1–0	Zenit Penza
FC Yelets	2–0	Don Novomoskovsk
FC Smolensk	2–0	FC Pskov-2000
Dynamo Vologda	1–2	Sheksna Cherepovets
23 April 2005
Kuzbass-Dynamo Kemerovo	0–0 (a.e.t.) (0–3 p)	Chkalovets Novosibirsk
Irtysh Omsk	0–2	Dynamo Barnaul
24 April 2005
Rubin-2 Kazan	2–1	Neftekhimik Nizhnekamsk
Lada-SOK Dimitrovgrad	1–2	Lada-Tolyatti
Alnas Almetyevsk	0–0 (a.e.t.) (2–3 p)	Neftyanik Ufa
25 April 2005
Zenit Chelyabinsk	0–2	Sodovik Sterlitamak
Volga Nizhny Novgorod	0–1	Energetik Uren
Uralets Nizhny Tagil	2–0	Tobol Kurgan
Gazovik-Gazprom Izhevsk	2–0	Dynamo Kirov
Gasovik Orenburg	0–2 (a.e.t.)	Nosta Novotroitsk

== Second round ==
Team 1	Score	Team 2
23 April 2005
Okean Nakhodka	2–0	Smena Komsomolsk-na-Amure
30 April 2005
Torpedo Volzhsky	1–3	Rotor-2 Volgograd
Olimpia Volgograd	1–0	SKA Rostov-on-Don
Druzhba Maykop	1–2	Spartak-UGP Anapa
Angusht Nazran	1–2 (a.e.t.)	Mashuk-KMV Pyatigorsk
3 May 2005
Zvezda Irkutsk	2–0	Sibiryak Bratsk
Zarya Leninsk-Kuznetsky	0–5	Dynamo Barnaul
Chkalovets Novosibirsk	3–0	Metallurg Krasnoyarsk
15 May 2005
Zenit-2 Saint Petersburg	0–1	Volga Tver
Spartak Kostroma	1–0 (a.e.t.)	Spartak Shchyolkovo
Sodovik Sterlitamak	3–1	Uralets Nizhny Tagil
Sheksna Cherepovets	0–1	Torpedo Vladimir
Saturn Yegoryevsk	3–1	Ryazan-Agrokomplekt
Presnya Moscow	1–0	Arsenal Tula
Nosta Novotroitsk	2–1	Neftyanik Ufa
Mordovia Saransk	3–1	Spartak Tambov
Lokomotiv Liski	1–2 (a.e.t.)	FC Yelets
Lokomotiv Kaluga	2–4	Vityaz Podolsk
FC Lobnya-Alla	1–0	Nika Moscow
Lada-Tolyatti	4–0	Rubin-2 Kazan
Energetik Uren	2–0	Gazovik-Gazprom Izhevsk
Baltika Kaliningrad	5–0	FC Smolensk

== Third round ==
Team 1	Score	Team 2
15 May 2005
Rotor-2 Volgograd	0–1	Olimpia Volgograd
16 May 2005
Mashuk-KMV Pyatigorsk	1–0	Spartak-UGP Anapa
24 May 2005
Okean Nakhodka	1–0	Zvezda Irkutsk
Dynamo Barnaul	3–0	Chkalovets Novosibirsk
5 June 2005
Vityaz Podolsk	2–1	Presnya Moscow
Torpedo Vladimir	2–1	Volga Tver
Spartak Kostroma	3–2 (a.e.t.)	Baltika Kaliningrad
Saturn Yegoryevsk	1–0	Mordovia Saransk
Nosta Novotroitsk	2–1	Sodovik Sterlitamak
Lada-Tolyatti	5–0	Energetik Uren
FC Yelets	2–1 (a.e.t.)	FC Lobnya-Alla

== Fourth round ==
Team 1	Score	Team 2
22 June 2005
Spartak Kostroma	3–2	FC Khimki
Volgar-Gazprom Astrakhan	2–0	Anzhi Makhachkala
Vityaz Podolsk	4–0	Avangard Kursk
Ural Yekaterinburg	1–1 (a.e.t.) (3–2 p)	Spartak Chelyabinsk
Torpedo Vladimir	5–1	Petrotrest Saint Petersburg
Spartak Nalchik	1–1 (a.e.t.) (6–5 p)	Fakel Voronezh
Saturn Yegoryevsk	3–2	KAMAZ Naberezhnye Chelny
Olimpia Volgograd	1–3	Kuban Krasnodar
Okean Nakhodka	3–1	Amur Blagoveshchensk
Mashuk-KMV Pyatigorsk	0–2	Dynamo Makhachkala
Luch-Energiya Vladivostok	1–0 (a.e.t.)	SKA-Energiya Khabarovsk
Lokomotiv Chita	3–3 (a.e.t.) (5–3 p)	Chkalovets-1936 Novosibirsk
FC Yelets	1–2 (a.e.t.)	Dynamo Bryansk
FC Oryol	0–1	Metallurg Lipetsk
Dynamo Barnaul	1–1 (a.e.t.) (2–4 p)	Metallurg-Kuzbass Novokuznetsk
25 June 2005
Nosta Novotroitsk	2–2 (a.e.t.) (3–5 p)	Lada-Tolyatti

== Round of 32 ==
Team 1	Agg.	Team 2	1st leg	2nd leg
Tom Tomsk	3–4	Spartak Kostroma	3–2	0–2
Spartak Moscow	8–1	Okean Nakhodka	6–0	2–1
Rubin Kazan	3–1	Vityaz Podolsk	1–0	2–1
Metallurg Lipetsk	1–4	Shinnik Yaroslavl	1–0	0–4
Lada-Tolyatti	1–2	Amkar Perm	1–0	0–2
CSKA Moscow	3–2	Torpedo Vladimir	2–1	1–1
Krylia Sovetov Samara	4–2	Saturn Yegoryevsk	4–1	0–1
Kuban Krasnodar	1–1 (a)	Zenit Saint Petersburg	1–1	0–0
Dynamo Makhachkala	3–6	FC Moscow	1–4	2–2
Dynamo Bryansk	0–4	Dynamo Moscow	0–0	0–4
Terek Grozny	6–1	Spartak Nalchik	5–0	1–1
Saturn Ramenskoye	3–2	Ural Yekaterinburg	1–1	2–1
Luch-Energiya Vladivostok	3–2	FC Rostov	2–1	1–1
Alania Vladikavkaz	2–2 (4–5 p)	Lokomotiv Chita	2–0	0–2 (a.e.t.)
Lokomotiv Moscow	3–1	Metallurg-Kuzbass Novokuznetsk	2–0	1–1
Volgar-Gazprom Astrakhan	0–4	Torpedo Moscow	0–2	0–2

== Round of 16 ==
Team 1	Agg.	Team 2	1st leg	2nd leg
Lokomotiv Chita	– (Note: Lokomotiv Chita was denied a professional licence, therefore the team was eliminated, thus Lokomotiv Moscow advances to the next round.)	Lokomotiv Moscow	–	–
Zenit Saint Petersburg	2–1	Terek Grozny	2–0	0–1
Luch-Energiya Vladivostok	0–2	Spartak Moscow	0–1	0–1
Rubin Kazan	2–1	Shinnik Yaroslavl	0–1	2–0 (a.e.t.)
Torpedo Moscow	4–3	FC Moscow	1–2	3–1
Krylia Sovetov Samara	2–2 (1–3 p)	Dynamo Moscow	2–0	0–2 (a.e.t.)
Amkar Perm	0–1	Saturn Ramenskoye	0–1	0–0
CSKA Moscow	8–0	Spartak Kostroma	5–0	3–0

== Quarter-finals ==
Team 1	Agg.	Team 2	1st leg	2nd leg
Zenit Saint Petersburg	5–2	Torpedo Moscow	2–0	3–2
Spartak Moscow	4–3	Lokomotiv Moscow	2–2	2–1
Rubin Kazan	2–5	CSKA Moscow	1–1	1–4
Saturn Ramenskoye	4–3	Dynamo Moscow	3–0	1–3

== Semi-finals ==
Team 1	Agg.	Team 2	1st leg	2nd leg
Spartak Moscow	4–2	Saturn Ramenskoye	1–1	3–1
CSKA Moscow	4–0	Zenit Saint Petersburg	1–0	3–0

== Final ==
19 May 2006
16:00 UTC+3

CSKA Moscow	3–0	Spartak Moscow
Jô 43', 90+3'; Vágner Love 90'	Report

Luzhniki Stadium, Moscow
Attendance: 67,000
Referee: Valentin Ivanov (Moscow)
