= Yevgeni Skachkov (footballer) =

Russian footballer (born 1978)

Personal information
- Full name: Yevgeni Mikhailovich Skachkov
- Date of birth: 23 December 1978 (age 47)
- Place of birth: Anapa, Russian SFSR
- Height: 1.77 m (5 ft 9 1/2 in)
- Position: Midfielder

Youth career
- LVUFK Luhansk
- DYuSSh-1 Suspekh

Senior career*
Years	Team	Apps	(Gls)
1995–1996	FC Avanhard-Industriya Rovenky	4	(0)
1996	FC Chernomorets Novorossiysk	0	(0)
1996	→ FC Chernomorets-d Novorossiysk (loan)	21	(1)
1997	FC Kuban Slavyansk-na-Kubani	24	(7)
1998	FC Chernomorets Novorossiysk	1	(0)
1998	FC Tyumen	10	(0)
1999	FC Volga Ulyanovsk	32	(2)
2000	PFC Spartak Nalchik	21	(1)
2001–2002	FC Krasnodar-2000 Krasnodar	45	(15)
2002	FC Kristall Smolensk	11	(1)
2003	FC Sodovik Sterlitamak	20	(0)
2004	FC Lokomotiv Chita	38	(7)
2005	FC Novorossiysk (amateur)		
2005	FC Amur Blagoveshchensk	18	(1)
2006	FC Spartak-UGP Anapa	17	(4)
2006	FC Aleks-Spartak UGP Vityazevo		
2007	FC Nara-Desna Naro-Fominsk	7	(0)
2007–2008	FC Stavros Vityazevo		
2009–2010	FC Pontos Vityazevo		
2011–2012	FC Parus Anapa		
- * Club domestic league appearances and goals

Yevgeni Mikhailovich Skachkov (Russian: Евгений Михайлович Скачков; born 23 December 1978 in Anapa) is a former Russian football player.
