= Yuri Kolovorotny =

Russian footballer

Personal information
- Full name: Yuri Aleksandrovich Kolovorotny
- Date of birth: 18 May 1984 (age 42)
- Height: 1.89 m (6 ft 2 1/2 in)
- Positions: Defender; midfielder

Youth career
- FC Torpedo-ZIL Moscow

Senior career*
Years	Team	Apps	(Gls)
2001–2002	FC Torpedo-ZIL Moscow	0	(0)
2003	FC Spartak-Avto Moscow		
2004–2005	FC Amur Blagoveshchensk	44	(6)
2006–2008	FC Torpedo-RG Moscow	67	(4)
2009	FC Dynamo Vologda	31	(3)
2010	FC Znamya Truda Orekhovo-Zuyevo	8	(0)
- * Club domestic league appearances and goals

Yuri Aleksandrovich Kolovorotny (Russian: Юрий Александрович Коловоротный; born 18 May 1984) is a former Russian professional football player.

== Club career ==
He played in the Russian Football National League for FC Amur Blagoveshchensk in 2005.
