= Denis Valdez Perez =

Russian footballer

Personal information
- Full name: Denis Umbertovich Valdez Perez
- Date of birth: 26 February 1979 (age 47)
- Place of birth: Moscow, Russian SFSR, Soviet Union
- Height: 1.86 m (6 ft 1 in)
- Position: Goalkeeper

Senior career*
Years	Team	Apps	(Gls)
1996	FC Uralan-d Elista	3	(0)
1997–1998	FC Uralan-d Elista (amateur)		
1999–2000	FC Uralan Elista	2	(0)
2001	FC Lokomotiv-Taym Mineralnye Vody	14	(0)
2002	FC Alla-L Lobnya (amateur)		
2003	FSC Ulan-Zalata Lagan		
2004	FC MZhK Ryazan (amateur)		
2005–2006	FC Spartak-MZhK Ryazan	10	(0)
2006	FC Don Novomoskovsk	5	(0)
- * Club domestic league appearances and goals

Denis Umbertovich Valdez Perez (Russian: Денис Умбертович Вальдес Перес; born 26 February 1979 in Moscow) is a former Russian football player.

== Personal life ==
Valdez Perez was born in Moscow to a Spanish father, Umberto, and a Russian mother.
