= Roman Studnev =

Russian footballer

Personal information
- Full name: Roman Anatolyevich Studnev
- Date of birth: 26 January 1978 (age 48)
- Place of birth: Stavropol, Russian SFSR
- Height: 1.78 m (5 ft 10 in)
- Positions: Defender; midfielder

Senior career*
Years	Team	Apps	(Gls)
1995–1997	FC Dynamo-d Stavropol	74	(0)
1996–2000	FC Dynamo Stavropol	57	(3)
2001	FC Volochanin-89 Vyshny Volochyok	6	(1)
2003	FC Dynamo Stavropol	29	(0)
2005	FC Dynamo Stavropol (D4)		
2005–2007	FC Volga Tver	76	(2)
2008	FC Stavropol (D4)		
2009–2013	FC Lokomotiv Liski	79	(0)
- * Club domestic league appearances and goals

Roman Anatolyevich Studnev (Russian: Роман Анатольевич Студнев; born 26 January 1978) is a former Russian professional football player.

== Club career ==
He played 4 seasons in the Russian Football National League for FC Dynamo Stavropol .

== Honours ==
- Russian Second Division Zone Centre best defender: 2010.
