= Sergei Ukharev =

Russian footballer

Personal information
- Full name: Sergei Yuryevich Ukharev
- Date of birth: 24 February 1985 (age 41)
- Height: 1.85 m (6 ft 1 in)
- Positions: Defender; forward

Senior career*
Years	Team	Apps	(Gls)
2002–2003	FC Amur Blagoveshchensk	0	(0)
2005	FC SKA-Energiya Khabarovsk	15	(1)
2006	FC Smena Komsomolsk-na-Amure	23	(0)
2007	FC Amur Blagoveshchensk	12	(0)
2008	FC Okean Nakhodka	25	(1)
2009–2010	FC Metallurg-Kuzbass Novokuznetsk	37	(2)
2011–2012	FC Amur-2010 Blagoveshchensk	24	(1)
2013	FC Lokomotiv Liski	7	(0)
- * Club domestic league appearances and goals

Sergei Yuryevich Ukharev (Russian: Серге́й Юрьевич Ухарев; born 24 February 1985) is a former Russian professional football player.

== Club career ==
He played in the Russian Football National League for FC SKA-Energiya Khabarovsk in 2005.
