= Andrei Ukhabov =

Russian footballer

Personal information
- Full name: Andrei Alekseyevich Ukhabov
- Date of birth: 22 January 1979 (age 47)
- Place of birth: Novorossiysk, Krasnodar Krai, Russian SFSR
- Height: 1.72 m (5 ft 8 in)
- Position: Midfielder

Senior career*
Years	Team	Apps	(Gls)
1996	FC Chernomorets-d Novorossiysk	29	(4)
1997	FC Dynamo-d Stavropol	42	(2)
1998	FC Dynamo Stavropol	5	(0)
2000–2001	FC Spartak-Kavkaztransgaz Izobilny	70	(5)
2002–2004	FC Okean Nakhodka	75	(6)
2005	FC Chernomorets Novorossiysk (D4)		
2007	FC Trud Voronezh (D4)		
2008–2009	FC Lokomotiv Liski	64	(1)
2010	FC Nara-ShBFR Naro-Fominsk	31	(2)
2011–2013	FC Slavyansky Slavyansk-na-Kubani	63	(4)
2013–2014	FC Vityaz Krymsk	13	(0)
- * Club domestic league appearances and goals

Andrei Alekseyevich Ukhabov (Russian: Андрей Алексеевич Ухабов; born 22 January 1979) is a former Russian professional football player.

== Club career ==
He played in the Russian Football National League for FC Dynamo Stavropol in 1998.
