= Lopatkin =

Lopatkin (Russian: Лопаткин) is a Russian masculine surname, its feminine counterpart is Lopatkina. Notable people with the surname include:

- Artyom Lopatkin (born 1975), Russian footballer
- Ulyana Lopatkina (born 1973), Russian ballet dancer
