= Aleksei Baranov (footballer) =

Russian footballer

Personal information
- Full name: Aleksei Viktorovich Baranov
- Date of birth: 25 January 1980 (age 46)
- Height: 1.80 m (5 ft 11 in)
- Position: Forward

Senior career*
Years	Team	Apps	(Gls)
2000	FC Don Azov		
2001–2002	FC Rostonnefteprodukt Salsk		
2002	FC Zhemchuzhina Budyonnovsk	7	(0)
2002	FC Mayak Rostov-on-Don		
2005–2006	FC Nara-Desna Naro-Fominsk	61	(44)
2007–2008	FC Torpedo-RG Moscow	42	(24)
2008–2009	FC MVD Rossii Moscow	20	(11)
2010–2011	FC Gazovik Orenburg	25	(7)
2012	FC Tyumen	7	(3)
2012–2013	FC Vityaz Podolsk	26	(4)
2014	FC Nara Naro-Fominsk (amateur)		
2015–2016	FC VDV-SportKlub Naro-Fominsk		
- * Club domestic league appearances and goals

Aleksei Viktorovich Baranov (Russian: Алексей Викторович Баранов; born 25 January 1980) is a former Russian professional football player.

== Club career ==
He played two seasons in the Russian Football National League for FC MVD Rossii Moscow and FC Gazovik Orenburg.

== Honours ==
- Russian Second Division Zone West best player: 2005.
- Russian Second Division Zone West top scorer: 2005 (24 goals), 2007 (16 goals), 2008 (18 goals).
