= Mikhail Pimenov =

Russian footballer

Personal information
- Full name: Mikhail Aleksandrovich Pimenov
- Date of birth: 19 September 1983 (age 43)
- Place of birth: Moscow, Russian SFSR
- Height: 1.80 m (5 ft 11 in)
- Positions: Midfielder; defender

Youth career
- FC Spartak Moscow

Senior career*
| Years | Team | Apps | (Gls) |
| 2001 | FC Spartak Moscow | 0 | (0) |
| 2002 | FC Mostransgaz Gazoprovod | 22 | (1) |
| 2003 | FC Shinnik Yaroslavl | 0 | (0) |
| 2004 | FC Izhevsk | 5 | (2) |
| 2004–2005 | FC Volga Nizhny Novgorod | 40 | (8) |
| 2006 | FC Alnas Almetyevsk | 20 | (4) |
| 2007–2011 | FC KAMAZ Naberezhnye Chelny | 126 | (7) |
| 2012–2014 | FC Tyumen | 58 | (11) |
| 2014–2016 | FC KAMAZ Naberezhnye Chelny | 41 | (3) |
- * Club domestic league appearances and goals

Mikhail Aleksandrovich Pimenov (Russian: Михаил Александрович Пименов; born 19 September 1983) is a former Russian professional footballer.

== Club career ==
He made his professional debut in the Russian Second Division in 2002 for FC Mostransgaz Gazoprovod.

He made his Russian Football National League debut for FC KAMAZ Naberezhnye Chelny on 28 March 2007 in a game against FC Spartak-MZhK Ryazan.
