= Georgi Gurtskaya =

Russian footballer

Personal information
- Full name: Georgi Dzhustanovich Gurtskaya
- Date of birth: 30 January 1986 (age 40)
- Height: 1.74 m (5 ft 8 1/2 in)
- Position: Forward

Youth career
- FC Spartak Moscow

Senior career*
Years	Team	Apps	(Gls)
2002	FC Mostransgaz Gazoprovod	12	(0)
2004–2007	FC Dynamo Moscow	1	(0)
2007	→ FC Dynamo St. Petersburg (loan)	14	(2)
2008	FC MVD Rossii Moscow	21	(0)
- * Club domestic league appearances and goals

Georgi Dzhustanovich Gurtskaya (Russian: Георгий Джустанович Гурцкая; born 30 January 1986) is a former Russian professional footballer.

== Club career ==
He made his debut in the Russian Premier League in 2004 for FC Dynamo Moscow.

== See also ==
- Football in Russia
