= Andrei Zhdanov (footballer) =

Russian footballer

Personal information
- Full name: Andrei Aleksandrovich Zhdanov
- Date of birth: 21 April 1980 (age 46)
- Place of birth: Sinegorye, Russian SFSR
- Height: 1.86 m (6 ft 1 in)
- Position: Forward

Youth career
- Chayka Voronezh

Senior career*
Years	Team	Apps	(Gls)
1997–1999	FC Lokomotiv Liski	54	(8)
2000	FC Spartak Moscow	0	(0)
2000	→ FC Spartak-d Moscow	33	(3)
2001	FC Rostselmash Rostov-on-Don	0	(0)
2001	FC Chernomorets Novorossiysk	1	(0)
2002	FC SKA Rostov-on-Don	8	(0)
2002	FC Progress Kamensk-Shakhtinsky (amateur)		
2002	FC Mostransgaz Gazoprovod	23	(8)
2003–2004	FC Gazovik-Gazprom Izhevsk	47	(6)
2004–2005	FC Dynamo Voronezh (amateur)		
2005	FC Sheksna Cherepovets	15	(2)
2006	FC Lokomotiv Liski	24	(5)
- * Club domestic league appearances and goals

Andrei Aleksandrovich Zhdanov (Russian: Андрей Александрович Жданов; born 21 April 1980) is a former Russian football player.

Zhdanov began playing football with FC Lokomotiv Liski before joining FC Spartak Moscow. After failing to appear for the senior side, he had brief spells with FC Rostselmash Rostov-on-Don and FC Chernomorets Novorossiysk in 2001, making a single appearance in the Russian Premier League.

He played for the main squad of FC Rostselmash Rostov-on-Don in the Russian Cup.
