= Vladislav Yefimov =

Russian footballer

Vladislav Yefimov Bлaдиcлaв Ефимoв
Personal information
- Full name: Vladislav Valeryevich Yefimov
- Date of birth: 8 October 1977
- Place of birth: Vyshny Volochyok, Russian SFSR
- Date of death: 21 January 2015 (aged 37)
- Height: 1.83 m (6 ft 0 in)
- Position: Striker

Senior career*
Years	Team	Apps	(Gls)
1993–1994	Volochanin Vyshny Volochyok	17	(0)
1995	Kolos Krasnodar	9	(3)
1995	Volochanin Vyshny Volochyok	14	(2)
1996	Torpedo Moscow	1	(0)
1996	Torpedo Moscow B	24	(7)
1997–1998	Volochanin Vyshny Volochyok	59	(14)
1998–1999	Charleroi	19	(11)
2000	Sartid Smederevo	25	(4)
2001	Hapoel Tzafririm Holon	1	(0)
2001	Lokomotiv Nizhny Novgorod	12	(0)
2002–2003	BSK Spirovo	51	(10)
2004	Volga Tver	24	(4)
2008	Senezh Solnechnogorsk		
- * Club domestic league appearances and goals

Vladislav Valeryevich Yefimov (Russian: Bлaдиcлaв Baлepьевич Ефимoв; born 8 October 1977, died 21 January 2015) was a Russian football striker.

== Club career ==
He played most of his early career with FC Volochanin-Ratmir Vyshny Volochyok. In 1996, he signed with Russian Premier League club FC Torpedo-Luzhniki Moscow. In 1998, he moved abroad signing with Belgian club R.O.C. de Charleroi-Marchienne. In winter break of the season 1999-2000 he moved to Serbian club FK Sartid Smederevo playing in the First League of FR Yugoslavia. He still played with Hapoel Tzafririm Holon F.C. in the Israeli Premier League during the first half of 2011, before returning to Russia in summer 2001 to play one season with FC Lokomotiv Nizhny Novgorod in the Russian First League. Afterwards he played with second league clubs FC BSK Spirovo and FC Volga Tver.

== Death ==
He was murdered during a robbery in 2015.
