= Ilnur Mukhametdinov =

Russian footballer

Personal information
- Full name: Ilnur Flyurovich Mukhametdinov
- Date of birth: 12 July 1985 (age 41)
- Height: 1.84 m (6 ft 1/2 in)
- Positions: Defender; midfielder

Senior career*
Years	Team	Apps	(Gls)
2007–2008	FC Yunit Samara	39	(6)
2008–2012	FC Volga Ulyanovsk	89	(11)
2012–2013	FC KAMAZ Naberezhnye Chelny	15	(1)
2013–2014	FC Volga Ulyanovsk	24	(4)
2015	FC Volga Ulyanovsk	26	(7)
2016–2017	FC KAMAZ Naberezhnye Chelny	21	(0)
- * Club domestic league appearances and goals

Ilnur Flyurovich Mukhametdinov (Russian: Ильнур Флюрович Мухаметдинов; born 12 July 1985) is a former Russian professional football player.

== Club career ==
He played in the Russian Football National League for FC Volga Ulyanovsk in 2008.
