= Yevgeni Pankov =

Russian footballer

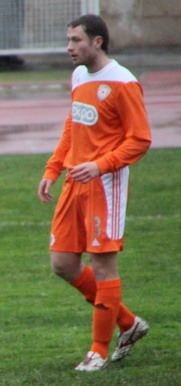

Personal information
- Full name: Yevgeni Viktorovich Pankov
- Date of birth: November 24, 1983 (age 42)
- Place of birth: Kerch, Ukrainian SSR
- Height: 1.83 m (6 ft 0 in)
- Position: Defender

Youth career
- 1998–1999: UOR Simferopol
- 1999–2001: Cernter-R-Kavkaz Krasnodar

Senior career*
Years	Team	Apps	(Gls)
2001–2005	Krasnodar-2000	68	(2)
2003	→ Druzhba Maykop (loan)	15	(1)
2005	Dynamo Makhachkala	17	(0)
2006	Spartak-MZhK Ryazan	12	(2)
2006	Spartak Nizhny Novgorod	14	(0)
2007	Krasnodar-2000	9	(0)
2007–2009	Dinamo Minsk	12	(0)
2008	→ Granit Mikashevichi (loan)	27	(1)
2009	→ Minsk (loan)	18	(0)
2010	Zhemchuzhina Sochi	18	(1)
2011–2012	Dynamo Stavropol	29	(0)
2012	Slavia Mozyr	7	(0)
2013	Afips Afipsky		
- * Club domestic league appearances and goals as of 4 December 2012

Yevgeni Viktorovich Pankov (Russian: Евгений Викторович Панков; born 24 November 1983) is a former Russian professional footballer.
