= Pavel Radishevsky =

Russian footballer

Pavel Rodishevsky
Personal information
- Date of birth: 13 September 1974 (age 52)
- Position: Goalkeeper

Youth career
- PFC CSKA Moscow

Senior career*
Years	Team	Apps	(Gls)
1991	FC Presnya Moscow	1	(0)
1992	FC Asmaral Moscow	1	(0)
1992	FC Presnya Moscow	35	(0)
1993	FC SKA Khabarovsk	5	(0)
1995	FC Yantar Yantarny		
1999–2000	FC Nara Naro-Fominsk (amateur)		
2002	FC Nara Naro-Fominsk (amateur)		
2004	FC Melodiya Aprelevka		
2005	FC Nara-Desna-2 Naro-Fominsk		
- * Club domestic league appearances and goals

Pavel Radishevsky (Russian: Павел Радишевский; born 13 September 1974) is a former Russian football player.
