= Malinin =

Malinin (Russian: Малинин; from малина, meaning raspberry) is a Russian masculine surname. Its feminine counterpart is Malinina. The surname may refer to:

- Aleksandr Malinin (born 1958), Russian singer
- Boris Malinin (1889–1949), Russian shipbuilding scientist
- Denis Malinin (born 1983), Kazakhstani football player
- Evgeniy Malinin (born 1986), Kyrgyzstan football player
- Ilia Malinin (born 2004), American figure skater
- Mikhail Malinin (1899–1960), Soviet general
- Mike Malinin (born 1967), American musician
- Tatiana Malinina (born 1973), Russian figure skater
- Yevgeny Malinin (1930–2001), Russian pianist
