= Nikolai Sergiyenko =

Uzbekistani footballer

Personal information
- Full name: Nikolai Nikolayevich Sergiyenko
- Date of birth: 30 September 1978 (age 48)
- Place of birth: Kogon, Uzbek SSR, Soviet Union
- Height: 1.66 m (5 ft 5 1/2 in)
- Position: Midfielder

Senior career*
Years	Team	Apps	(Gls)
1997–1999	FJ Buxoro	78	(21)
2000	FC Shinnik Yaroslavl	16	(2)
2001	FJ Buxoro	9	(2)
2001	FC Sibur-Khimik Dzerzhinsk	14	(4)
2002–2006	FC Sibir Novosibirsk	104	(19)
2006	FC Metallurg-Kuzbass Novokuznetsk	19	(4)
2007–2008	FC Amur Blagoveshchensk	45	(12)
2009–2012	FC Chelyabinsk	86	(3)

International career
1999	Uzbekistan	1	(0)
- * Club domestic league appearances and goals as of 20:52, 12 June 2012 (UTC)

Nikolai Nikolayevich Sergiyenko (Russian: Сергиенко Николай Николаевич; born 30 September 1978) is an Uzbekistani professional football player. He last played in the Russian Second Division for FC Chelyabinsk. He also holds Russian citizenship.
