= Dmitri Shovgenov =

Russian footballer

Personal information
- Full name: Dmitri Aleksandrovich Shovgenov
- Date of birth: 10 April 1987 (age 39)
- Place of birth: Orotukan, Magadan Oblast, Russian SFSR
- Height: 1.70 m (5 ft 7 in)
- Positions: Forward; midfielder

Senior career*
Years	Team	Apps	(Gls)
2004–2006	FC Krasnodar-2000	61	(9)
2006	FC Spartak Nizhny Novgorod	5	(0)
2007	FC Krasnodar-2000	18	(5)
2008	FC Gubkin	19	(2)
2008	FC Druzhba Maykop	11	(0)
2009–2010	FC Stavropolye-2009	23	(5)
2010	→ FC Kavkaztransgaz-2005 Ryzdvyany (loan)	31	(13)
2011–2013	FC Pskov-747	58	(18)
2013	FC Torpedo Armavir	8	(0)
- * Club domestic league appearances and goals

Dmitri Aleksandrovich Shovgenov (Russian: Дмитрий Александрович Шовгенов; born 10 April 1987) is a former Russian professional football player.

== Club career ==
He made his Russian Football National League debut for FC Spartak Nizhny Novgorod on 3 September 2006 in a game against FC Dynamo Bryansk. That was his only season in the FNL.
