= Yevgeni Shvoren =

Russian footballer

Personal information
- Full name: Yevgeni Sergeyevich Shvoren
- Date of birth: 13 December 1982 (age 43)
- Place of birth: Kaliningrad, Russian SFSR
- Height: 1.85 m (6 ft 1 in)
- Position: Defender

Youth career
- SDYuSShOR-5 Yunost Kaliningrad

Senior career*
Years	Team	Apps	(Gls)
1999	FC Baltika-Yu Kaliningrad		
2000–2001	FC Baltik Plus Kaliningrad		
2002–2005	FC Dynamo Makhachkala	103	(1)
2005	FC Baltika Kaliningrad	12	(0)
2006	FC Spartak-MZhK Ryazan	16	(0)
2006	PFC Spartak Nalchik	0	(0)
2007	FC Chernomorets Novorossiysk	19	(1)
2008	FC Olimpia Volgograd	16	(2)
2008–2009	FC Zhemchuzhina-Sochi	17	(1)
2010–2011	FC Dnepr Smolensk	35	(3)
2013	FC BMW-Alyans Kaliningrad		
- * Club domestic league appearances and goals

Yevgeni Sergeyevich Shvoren (Russian: Евгений Серге́евич Шворень; born 13 December 1982) is a former Russian professional football player.

== Club career ==
He played in the Russian Football National League for FC Dynamo Makhachkala in 2002. He made one appearance for PFC Spartak Nalchik on 20 September 2006 in a Russian Cup game against FC Sibir Novosibirsk.
