= Vladimir Frolov (footballer) =

Russian footballer

Personal information
- Full name: Vladimir Aleksandrovich Frolov
- Date of birth: 31 October 1982 (age 44)
- Height: 1.83 m (6 ft 0 in)
- Position: Midfielder

Senior career*
Years	Team	Apps	(Gls)
2001	FC Dynamo Makhachkala	34	(1)
2003–2004	FC Dynamo Makhachkala	46	(11)
2005	FC Sakhalin Yuzhno-Sakhalinsk (amateur)		
2005–2007	FC Spartak-MZhK Ryazan	44	(5)
2007–2008	FC Sakhalin Yuzhno-Sakhalinsk	16	(0)
2009	FC Sever Murmansk	5	(0)
- * Club domestic league appearances and goals

Vladimir Aleksandrovich Frolov (Russian: Владимир Александрович Фролов; born 31 October 1982) is a former Russian professional football player.

== Club career ==
He played two seasons in the Russian Football National League for FC Dynamo Makhachkala and FC Spartak-MZhK Ryazan.
