= Sergei Faustov =

Russian footballer

Personal information
- Full name: Sergei Sergeyevich Faustov
- Date of birth: 7 February 1983 (age 43)
- Place of birth: Stary Oskol, Belgorod Oblast, Russian SFSR
- Height: 1.83 m (6 ft 0 in)
- Position: Forward

Senior career*
Years	Team	Apps	(Gls)
2000–2001	Olimpia Volgograd	60	(13)
2002–2003	Rostov	0	(0)
2003	Fakel Voronezh	12	(1)
2004	Ural Sverdlovsk Oblast	4	(0)
2004	Titan Moscow	5	(0)
2005–2006	Lokomotiv Liski	62	(29)
2007–2008	Rotor Volgograd	35	(11)
2008–2010	Gubkin	61	(37)
2010–2011	Fakel Voronezh	12	(3)
2011–2012	Sokol Saratov	20	(0)
2012–2013	Lokomotiv Liski	27	(4)
2013	Podolye Podolsky district	20	(8)
2014	Dolgoprudny	21	(8)
- * Club domestic league appearances and goals

Sergei Sergeyevich Faustov (Russian: Серге́й Серге́евич Фаустов; born 7 February 1983) is a former Russian professional footballer.

== Club career ==
He made his debut for FC Rostov on 14 September 2002 in a Russian Cup game against FC Kristall Smolensk.

He played two seasons in the Russian Football National League for FC Fakel Voronezh.

== Honours ==
- Russian Cup finalist: 2003 (played for the main FC Rostov squad in the competition).
- Russian Second Division Zone Center top scorer: 2006 (16 goals).
