= Ilya Yagodkin =

Russian footballer

Personal information
- Full name: Ilya Viktorovich Yagodkin
- Date of birth: 17 July 1977 (age 49)
- Height: 1.83 m (6 ft 0 in)
- Position: Defender

Senior career*
Years	Team	Apps	(Gls)
1998	FC Pskov	7	(1)
1999–2000	FC Energiya Velikiye Luki	46	(4)
2002–2004	PFC Spartak Nalchik	97	(3)
2005	FK Žalgiris Vilnius	5	(1)
2006	FC Volochanin-Ratmir Vyshny Volochyok	30	(3)
2007	FC Dynamo St. Petersburg	27	(2)
2008–2015	FC Pskov-747 Pskov	135	(14)
- * Club domestic league appearances and goals

Ilya Viktorovich Yagodkin (Russian: Илья Викторович Ягодкин; born 17 July 1977) is a former Russian professional footballer.

== Club career ==
He played 3 seasons in the Russian Football National League for PFC Spartak Nalchik.
