= Yan Ishchenko =

Russian footballer

Personal information
- Full name: Yan Yevgenyevich Ishchenko
- Date of birth: 10 March 1980 (age 46)
- Place of birth: Krylovskaya, Russian SFSR
- Height: 1.98 m (6 ft 6 in)
- Position: Forward

Youth career
- DYuSSh-7 Sochi

Senior career*
Years	Team	Apps	(Gls)
2001	FC Priazovye Yeysk (amateur)		
2001–2002	FC Zhemchuzhina Sochi	48	(15)
2003	FC Spartak Shchyolkovo	17	(2)
2003	FC Kristall Smolensk	12	(0)
2004	FC Volgar-Gazprom Astrakhan	13	(0)
2005	FC Spartak-UGP Anapa	12	(8)
2005–2006	FC Rotor Volgograd	37	(16)
2007	FC Metallurg Lipetsk	9	(0)
2008	FC SKA Rostov-on-Don	11	(1)
2008	FC Dynamo Bryansk	14	(1)
2009	FC SKA Rostov-on-Don	10	(0)
2009	FC Dongazdobycha Sulin		
2010	FC Bataysk-2007	7	(0)
2011	FC Mashuk-KMV Pyatigorsk	2	(0)
2019	FC Boyets Vodopadny		
- * Club domestic league appearances and goals

Yan Yevgenyevich Ishchenko (Russian: Ян Евгеньевич Ищенко; born 10 March 1980) is a former Russian professional football player.

== Club career ==
He played three seasons in the Russian Football National League for FC Kristall Smolensk, FC SKA Rostov-on-Don and FC Dynamo Bryansk.
