= Aleksei Sherstnyov =

Russian footballer

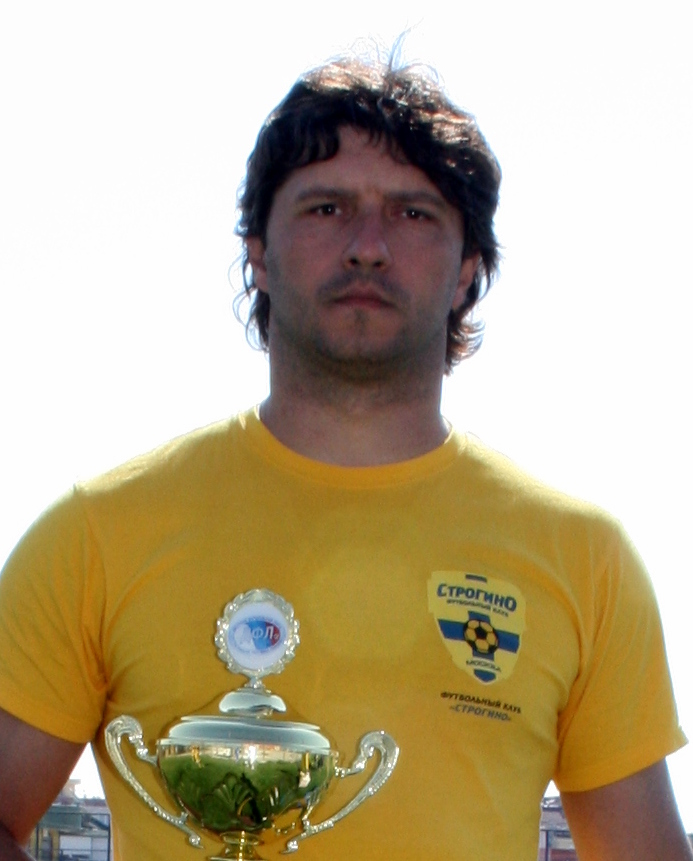

Personal information
- Full name: Aleksei Mikhailovich Sherstnyov
- Date of birth: 1 May 1975 (age 51)
- Place of birth: Grozny, Russian SFSR
- Height: 1.75 m (5 ft 9 in)
- Positions: Forward; midfielder

Team information
- Current team: FC Yenisey Krasnoyarsk (assistant manager)

Senior career*
Years	Team	Apps	(Gls)
1992–1994	FC Saturn Ramenskoye	86	(11)
1995	FC Torgmash Lyubertsy	35	(10)
1995	FC Dynamo-2 Moscow	1	(1)
1996–1997	FC Dynamo-d Moscow	41	(10)
1998	FC Dynamo-2 Moscow	28	(5)
1999	FC Tyumen	27	(3)
2000	FK Ventspils	7	(2)
2000–2001	FC Anzhi Makhachkala	17	(0)
2002	FC Torpedo-ZIL Moscow	21	(3)
2003	FC Dynamo Stavropol	17	(10)
2003	FC Volga Ulyanovsk	15	(6)
2004	FC Lisma-Mordovia Saransk	16	(1)
2005	FC Dynamo Kirov	12	(5)
2005	FC Spartak Shchyolkovo	16	(1)
2006	FC Dynamo Kirov	22	(5)
2007	FC Gazovik Orenburg	14	(1)
2008	FC Fortuna Mytishchi		
2008	FC Senezh Solnechnogorsk		

Managerial career
- 2008–2010: FC Dynamo Moscow (youth team)
- 2010–2011: UOR Master-Saturn Yegoryevsk
- 2011–2016: FC Strogino Moscow (academy)
- 2017–2018: FC Strogino Moscow (assistant)
- 2018: FC Strogino Moscow
- 2020: FC Dynamo Moscow (U19)
- 2022–2023: FShM Moscow
- 2023–2024: FC Sakhalinets Moscow
- 2024: FC Dynamo Saint Petersburg
- 2024–2025: FC Kompozit Pavlovsky Posad
- 2025: FC Znamya Truda Orekhovo-Zuyevo
- 2026–: FC Yenisey Krasnoyarsk (assistant)
- * Club domestic league appearances and goals

Aleksei Mikhailovich Sherstnyov (Russian: Алексей Михайлович Шерстнёв; born 1 May 1975) is a Russian professional football coach and a former player who is an assistant manager with FC Yenisey Krasnoyarsk.

== Playing career ==
He made his professional debut in the Russian Second Division in 1992 for FC Saturn Ramenskoye. He played one game in the UEFA Intertoto Cup 1997 for FC Dynamo Moscow.

== Personal life ==
His son Stepan Sherstnyov is a professional footballer.
