= Rais Sitdikov =

Russian footballer

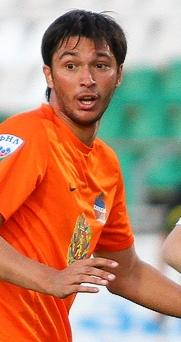

Personal information
- Full name: Rais Zinurovich Sitdikov
- Date of birth: 30 November 1988 (age 37)
- Place of birth: Krasnoyarsk, Russian SFSR
- Height: 1.85 m (6 ft 1 in)
- Position: Midfielder

Youth career
- DYuSSh-2 Krasnoyarsk

Senior career*
Years	Team	Apps	(Gls)
2006	FC Shakhtyor Prokopyevsk	22	(2)
2007–2013	FC Yenisey Krasnoyarsk	153	(3)
2014	FC Zenit Penza	10	(0)
- * Club domestic league appearances and goals

Rais Zinurovich Sitdikov (Russian: Раис Зинурович Ситдиков; born 30 November 1988) is a former Russian professional football player.

== Club career ==
He played 3 seasons in the Russian Football National League for FC Yenisey Krasnoyarsk.
