= Dmitri Zakharenkov =

Russian footballer

Personal information
- Full name: Dmitri Anatolyevich Zakharenkov
- Date of birth: 6 June 1978
- Date of death: 23 August 2017 (aged 39)
- Place of death: Novocherkassk, Russia
- Height: 1.85 m (6 ft 1 in)
- Position: Forward

Senior career*
Years	Team	Apps	(Gls)
1997–1998	FC Energiya Novocherkassk		
2000–2001	FC Energiya-NEVZ Novocherkassk		
2002	FC Shakhtyor Shakhty	17	(5)
2002	FC Vodnik Rostov-on-Don		
2003–2006	FC Chita	125	(35)
2007	FC Amur Blagoveshchensk	12	(1)
2008	FC Chayka Peschanokopskoye (amateur)		
2008	FC MITOS-ROUOR Novocherkassk		
2008	FC Norma Rostov-on-Don		
2010	FC Dongazdobycha-2 Sulin		
2011	FC Rostov-2018-Elektron Rostov-on-Don		
2011	FC Dongazdobycha Sulin		
2012–2013	FC Elektron Rostov-on-Don		
2016	FC Shakhtyor-2014 Shakhty		
- * Club domestic league appearances and goals

Dmitri Anatolyevich Zakharenkov (Russian: Дмитрий Анатольевич Захаренков; 6 June 1978 – 23 August 2017) was a Russian professional football player.

== Club career ==
He played 3 seasons in the Russian Football National League for FC Chita.

== Honours ==
- Russian Second Division Zone East top scorer: 2006 (22 goals).
