= Zelemkhan Zangiyev =

Russian footballer

Personal information
- Full name: Zelemkhan Magomedovich Zangiyev
- Date of birth: 27 May 1974
- Date of death: 14 January 2012 (aged 37)
- Place of death: Vladikavkaz, Russia
- Height: 1.79 m (5 ft 10 1/2 in)
- Positions: Striker; midfielder

Senior career*
Years	Team	Apps	(Gls)
1995–1996	FC Angusht Nazran	23	(4)
1999	FC Signal Izobilny (amateur)		
2000	FC Spartak-Kavkaztransgaz Izobilny	31	(5)
2001–2006	FC Angusht Nazran	174	(39)
2007	FC Biolog Novokubansk (amateur)		
2009	FC Angusht Nazran	32	(4)
- * Club domestic league appearances and goals

Zelemkhan Magomedovich Zangiyev (Russian: Зелимхан Магомедович Зангиев; 27 May 1974 – 14 January 2012, Vladikavkaz, Russia) was a Russian professional football player.

== Club career ==
He made his Russian Football National League debut for FC Angusht Nazran on 5 April 2006 in a game against FC Kuban Krasnodar. That was his only season in the FNL.
