= Aleksandr Malin =

Russian footballer and coach

Personal information
- Full name: Aleksandr Anatolyevich Malin
- Date of birth: 3 February 1973 (age 53)
- Place of birth: Tambov, Russian SFSR
- Height: 1.80 m (5 ft 11 in)
- Position: Midfielder

Senior career*
| Years | Team | Apps | (Gls) |
| 1990–1993 | FC Spartak Tambov | 111 | (3) |
| 1994 | FC Obninsk | 29 | (2) |
| 1995–1999 | FC Spartak Tambov | 141 | (29) |
| 1999–2000 | FC Metallurg Lipetsk | 56 | (5) |
| 2001–2002 | FC Volgar-Gazprom Astrakhan | 45 | (1) |
| 2002 | FC Metallurg Lipetsk | 17 | (0) |
| 2003 | FC Dynamo Stavropol | 37 | (3) |
| 2004–2007 | FC Dynamo Bryansk | 141 | (11) |
| 2008 | FC Metallurg Lipetsk | 23 | (1) |
| 2009–2010 | FC Spartak Tambov | 56 | (3) |

Managerial career
- 2013–2016: FC Tambov (assistant)
- 2016: FC Tambov (caretaker)
- 2016–2018: FC Tambov (assistant)
- 2018–2021: FC Tambov II (assistant)
- 2020–2021: FC Tambov (U20 administrator)
- * Club domestic league appearances and goals

Aleksandr Anatolyevich Malin (Russian: Александр Анатольевич Малин; born 3 February 1973) is a Russian professional football coach and a former player.

== Club career ==
He played 8 seasons in the Russian Football National League for FC Metallurg Lipetsk, FC Volgar-Gazprom Astrakhan and FC Dynamo Bryansk.
