= Kirill Kurochkin =

Russian footballer

Personal information
- Full name: Kirill Sergeyevich Kurochkin
- Date of birth: 30 June 1988 (age 38)
- Place of birth: Saransk, Russian SFSR
- Height: 1.82 m (5 ft 11 1/2 in)
- Position: Midfielder

Senior career*
Years	Team	Apps	(Gls)
2004–2007	FC Mordovia Saransk	74	(25)
2007–2009	FC Dynamo Moscow	0	(0)
2008	→ FC Mordovia Saransk (loan)	20	(10)
2009	→ FC Metallurg Lipetsk (loan)	11	(1)
2010–2011	FC Svetoservis Kadoshkino		
2012	FC Torpedo Pavlovo		
2012–2013	FC Svetoservis Kadoshkino		
2014	FC Torbeyevo		

International career
2007	Russia U19	5	(0)
- * Club domestic league appearances and goals

Kirill Sergeyevich Kurochkin (Russian: Кирилл Серге́евич Курочкин; born 30 June 1988) is a former Russian footballer.

== Career ==
He made his debut for FC Dynamo Moscow in a Russian Cup game against FC Zenit St. Petersburg on 8 August 2007. Dynamo lost 3–9.

== Personal life ==
In February 2017, he was convicted of drug possession and given a 3-year suspended sentence. His suspended sentence was extended in the summer 2018 to 2020 due to another drug possession charge.
