= Aleksandr Zakharov (footballer, born 1987) =

Russian footballer

Personal information
- Full name: Aleksandr Konstantinovich Zakharov
- Date of birth: 11 March 1987 (age 39)
- Place of birth: Moscow, Soviet Union
- Height: 1.81 m (5 ft 11 1/2 in)
- Position: Forward

Youth career
- Chertanovo Moscow

Senior career*
Years	Team	Apps	(Gls)
2005–2008	Nika Moscow	61	(5)
2009	Prialit Reutov (D4)		
2010	Neman Grodno	9	(0)
2010	Prialit Reutov (D4)	14	(11)
2011	Podolye Podolsky district	25	(2)
- * Club domestic league appearances and goals

Aleksandr Konstantinovich Zakharov (Russian: Александр Константинович Захаров; born 11 March 1987) is a former Russian professional football player.
