= Yuri Pershin =

Russian footballer

Personal information
- Full name: Yuri Aleksandrovich Pershin
- Date of birth: 30 June 1986 (age 40)
- Place of birth: Leningrad, Russian SFSR
- Height: 1.81 m (5 ft 11 1/2 in)
- Position: Forward

Youth career
- FC Dynamo Saint Petersburg

Senior career*
Years	Team	Apps	(Gls)
2003	FC Dynamo-2 Saint Petersburg (amateur)		
2004–2006	FC Zenit-2 Saint Petersburg	45	(6)
2006	FC Metallurg-Kuzbass Novokuznetsk	18	(1)
2007	FC Zenit-2 Saint Petersburg	23	(5)
2008–2010	FC Vityaz Podolsk	71	(9)
- * Club domestic league appearances and goals

Yuri Aleksandrovich Pershin (Russian: Юрий Александрович Першин; born 30 June 1986) is a former Russian football player.

== Club career ==
He played two seasons in the Russian Football National League for FC Vityaz Podolsk.
