= Nikolai Ronzhin =

Russian footballer and coach

Personal information
- Full name: Nikolai Gennadyevich Ronzhin
- Date of birth: 18 September 1980 (age 46)
- Height: 1.86 m (6 ft 1 in)
- Position: Defender

Youth career
- FC Dynamo Izhevsk

Senior career*
Years	Team	Apps	(Gls)
1997–1999	FC Dynamo Izhevsk	65	(1)
2000–2006	FC SOYUZ-Gazprom Izhevsk	139	(9)
2007–2009	FC Metallurg Krasnoyarsk	64	(4)
2010	FC Neftekhimik Nizhnekamsk	5	(0)
2010	FC SOYUZ-Gazprom Izhevsk	7	(0)
2011–2012	FC Zenit-Izhevsk	18	(0)

Managerial career
- 2018: FC Zenit-Izhevsk (assistant)
- * Club domestic league appearances and goals

Nikolai Gennadyevich Ronzhin (Russian: Николай Геннадьевич Ронжин; born 18 September 1980) is a Russian professional football coach and a former player.

== Club career ==
He made his Russian Football National League debut for FC Gazovik-Gazprom Izhevsk on 1 July 2000 in a game against PFC Spartak Nalchik.
