= Andrei Smyshlyayev =

Russian footballer

Personal information
- Full name: Andrei Aleksandrovich Smyshlyayev
- Date of birth: 29 May 1983 (age 43)
- Height: 1.80 m (5 ft 11 in)
- Position: Midfielder

Youth career
- FC Lokomotiv Chita

Senior career*
| Years | Team | Apps | (Gls) |
| 2001 | FC Lokomotiv Chita | 0 | (0) |
| 2001 | FC Selenga Ulan-Ude | 13 | (0) |
| 2002 | FC Lokomotiv Chita | 2 | (0) |
| 2003 | FC Sibiryak Bratsk | 22 | (2) |
| 2004–2008 | FC Chita | 91 | (4) |
| 2007 | → FC Sibiryak Bratsk (loan) | 15 | (8) |
| 2008–2009 | FC Sibiryak Bratsk | 35 | (4) |
| 2010–2012 | FC Chita | 62 | (7) |
- * Club domestic league appearances and goals

Andrei Aleksandrovich Smyshlyayev (Russian: Андрей Александрович Смышляев; born 29 May 1983) is a former Russian professional football player.

== Club career ==
He played 3 seasons in the Russian Football National League for FC Lokomotiv Chita.
