= Artyom Lopatkin =

Russian footballer

Personal information
- Full name: Artyom Yevgenyevich Lopatkin
- Date of birth: 8 August 1975 (age 51)
- Place of birth: Ivanovo, Russian SFSR
- Height: 1.80 m (5 ft 11 in)
- Position: Forward

Senior career*
Years	Team	Apps	(Gls)
1994–1995	FC Dynamo Saky	41	(15)
1996–2003	FC Stal Alchevsk	244	(42)
2004	FC Dinaburg	5	(0)
2005–2006	FC Spartak Lukhovitsy	47	(20)
2006–2007	FC Nara-Desna Naro-Fominsk	42	(8)
2008	FC Volga Tver	30	(4)
2009–2010	FC Tekstilshchik Ivanovo	43	(17)
2010	FC Zelenograd	16	(6)
2011	FC Sever Murmansk	12	(0)
2011	FC Kooperator Vichuga (D4)	?	(4)
- * Club domestic league appearances and goals

Artyom Yevgenyevich Lopatkin (Russian: Артём Евгеньевич Лопаткин; born 8 August 1975) is a former Russian professional football player. He also holds Ukrainian citizenship, although it is not in accordance to the laws of Ukraine to have two citizenships.

In 1999 he scored eight goals in the 1998-99 Ukrainian Cup for FC Stal Alchevsk and repeating the record for the most goals scored in the cup's season that was set by Vitaliy Parakhnevych.
