= Aleksandr Shmonin =

Russian footballer

Personal information
- Full name: Aleksandr Sergeyevich Shmonin
- Date of birth: 18 January 1984 (age 42)
- Place of birth: Khabarovsk, Russian SFSR
- Height: 1.78 m (5 ft 10 in)
- Position: Midfielder

Senior career*
Years	Team	Apps	(Gls)
2002–2003	FC SKA-Energiya Khabarovsk	3	(0)
2003	FC Smena Komsomolsk-na-Amure	8	(1)
2004	FC SKA-Energiya Khabarovsk	0	(0)
2004	FC Krylya Sakhalina Yuzhno-Sakhalinsk		
2004–2005	FC SKA-Energiya-2 Khabarovsk		
2006	FC Smena Komsomolsk-na-Amure	34	(1)
2007–2009	FC LUTEK-Energiya Luchegorsk		
2010	FC Mostovik-Primorye Ussuriysk	25	(3)
2011–2012	FC LUTEK-Energiya Luchegorsk		
2013	FC Smena Komsomolsk-na-Amure	4	(1)
2013	FC Belogorsk		
2013	FC LUTEK-Energiya Luchegorsk		
- * Club domestic league appearances and goals

Aleksandr Sergeyevich Shmonin (Russian: Александр Серге́евич Шмонин; born 18 January 1984) is a former Russian professional football player.

== Club career ==
He played in the Russian Football National League for FC SKA-Energiya Khabarovsk in 2002.
