= CSK Stadium =

Sports venue in Ryazan, Russia

Central Sports Complex Stadium
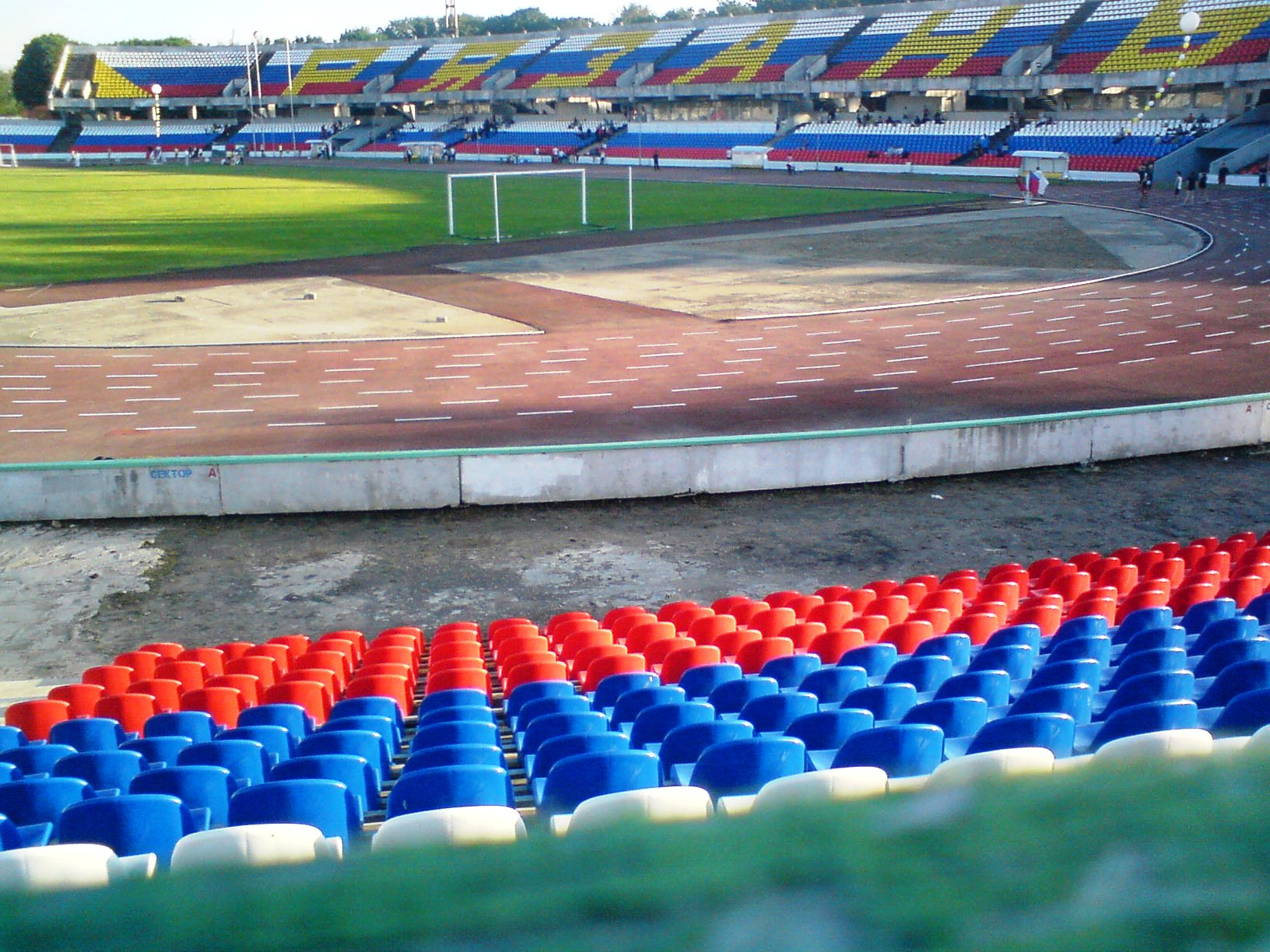
- Interactive map of Central Sports Complex Stadium
- Full name: Central Sports Complex Stadium
- Location: Ryazan, Russia
- Coordinates: 54°36′52″N 39°44′10″E
- Capacity: 25,000
- Surface: grass

Construction
- Opened: 1980
- Renovated: 2008

Tenant
- FC Zvezda Ryazan

The Central Sports Complex Stadium (Russian: Stadion Tsentral'nogo Sportivnogo Kompleksa) is a stadium in Ryazan, Russia. The Central Sports Complex Stadium opened in 1980 and was formerly the home of the now defunct local football teams FC Spartak-MZhK Ryazan and FC Ryazan. It is currently the home of FC Zvezda Ryazan. The CSC Stadium was most recently refurbished in 2008, and is now a 25,000 capacity all-seater stadium, with a running-track for athletics.

== Gallery ==
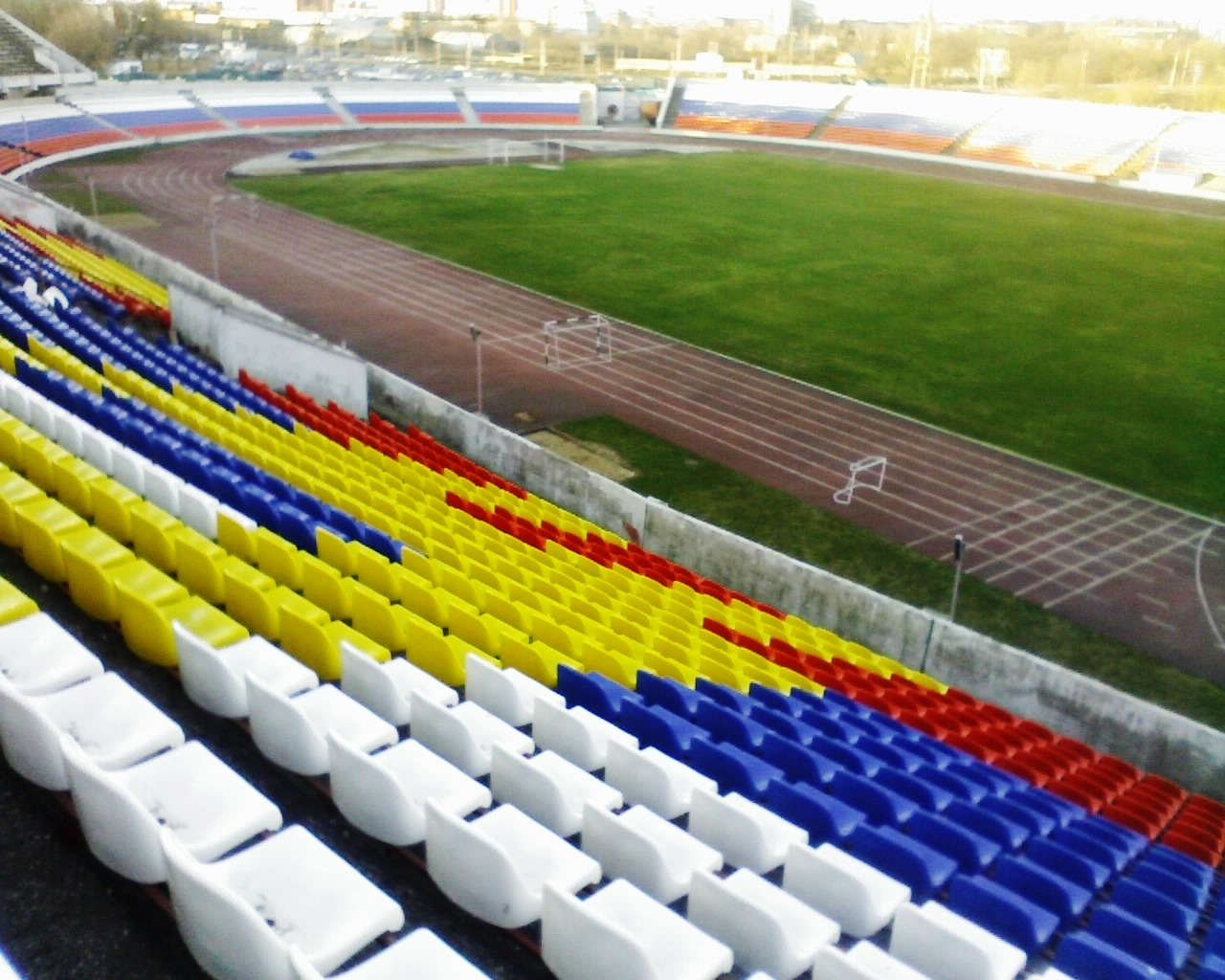

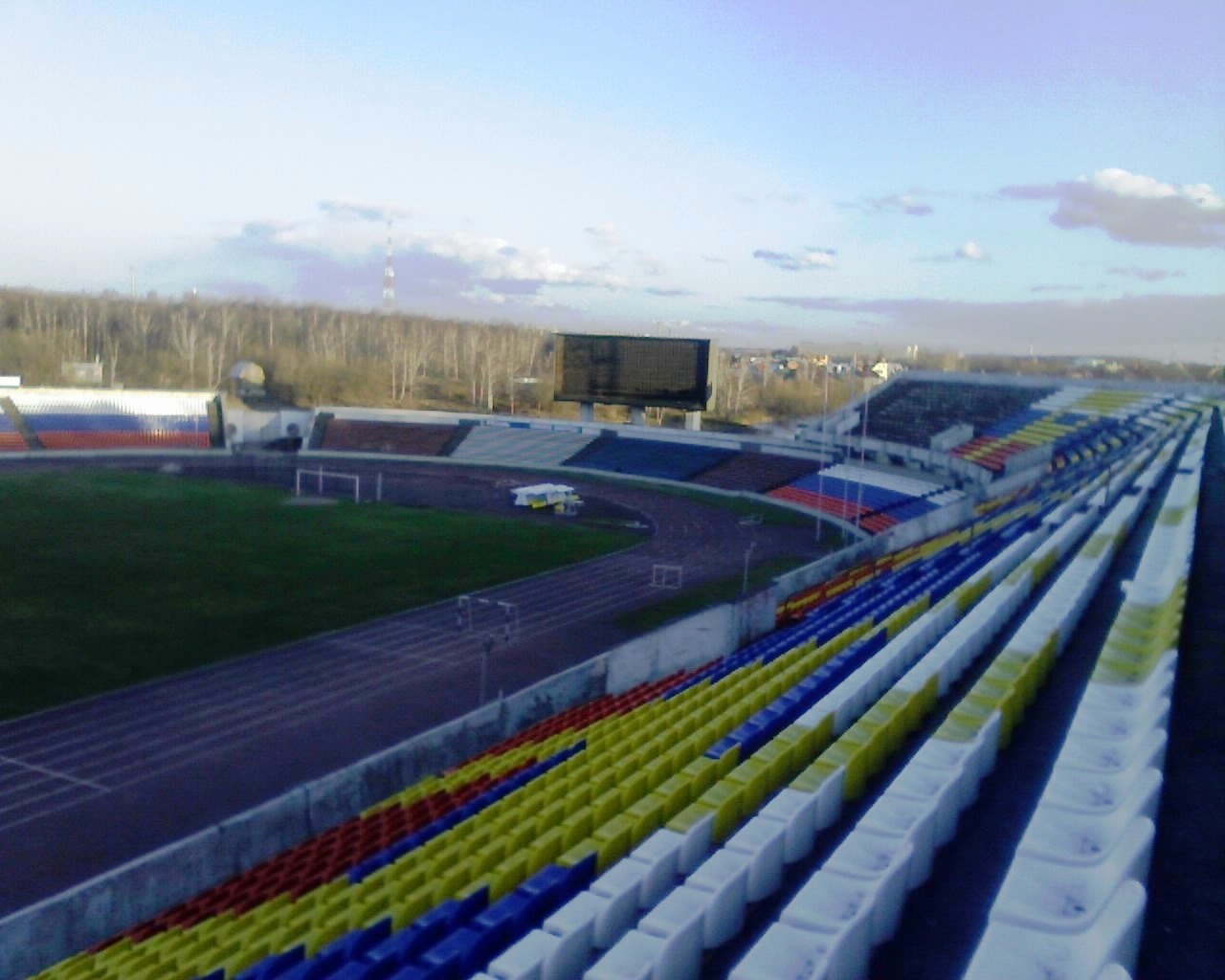

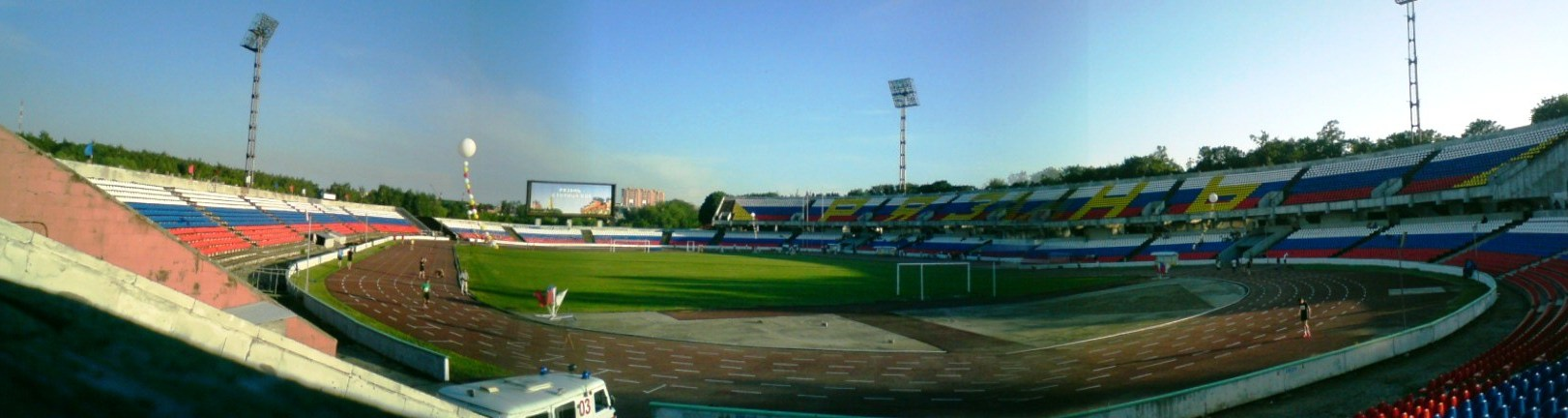
Panorama of stadium
