= Valentin Yegunov =

Russian footballer

Personal information
- Full name: Valentin Vladimirovich Yegunov
- Date of birth: 23 April 1976 (age 50)
- Place of birth: Rostov Oblast, Russian SFSR
- Height: 1.75 m (5 ft 9 in)
- Position: Forward

Senior career*
Years	Team	Apps	(Gls)
1992–1997	FC Zenit St. Petersburg	17	(0)
1993	FC Zenit-2 St. Petersburg	14	(2)
1994–1997	FC Zenit-d St. Petersburg	37	(14)
1997–1998	FC Tyumen	38	(8)
1999	FC Torpedo-ZIL Moscow	20	(3)
2000	FC Shinnik Yaroslavl	27	(1)
2001–2002	FC Tyumen	38	(8)
2003–2006	FC Metallurg-Kuzbass Novokuznetsk	128	(36)
2008	FC Dynamo Barnaul	20	(3)
2008	FC Sever Murmansk	15	(1)
2009–2015	FC Novokuznetsk	103	(40)

International career
1993	Russia U-17	10	(9)
1995	Russia U-19	11	(6)
- * Club domestic league appearances and goals

Valentin Vladimirovich Yegunov (Russian: Валентин Владимирович Егунов; born 23 April 1976) is a former Russian professional footballer.

== Club career ==
He made his debut in the Russian Premier League in 1996 for FC Zenit St. Petersburg.

== Honours ==
- Russian Second Division, Zone East top scorer: 2009 (15 goals), 2010 (19 goals).
- Russian Second Division, Zone East best player and best striker: 2009, 2010.
