= Denis Snimshchikov =

Russian footballer (born 1975)

Personal information
- Full name: Denis Georgiyevich Snimshchikov
- Date of birth: 7 December 1975 (age 50)
- Place of birth: Volgograd, Russian SFSR
- Height: 1.70 m (5 ft 7 in)
- Position: Midfielder

Senior career*
Years	Team	Apps	(Gls)
1995–1997	FC Dynamo Mikhaylovka	81	(9)
1999	FC Olimpia Volgograd (D4)		
2000–2004	FC Olimpia Volgograd	135	(40)
2004	FC Dynamo Makhachkala	11	(0)
2005	FC Lokomotiv-NN Nizhny Novgorod	30	(2)
2006–2009	FC Mordovia Saransk	107	(17)
2010	FC Zvezda Ryazan	28	(1)
- * Club domestic league appearances and goals

Denis Georgiyevich Snimshchikov (Russian: Денис Георгиевич Снимщиков; born 7 December 1975) is a former Russian professional football player.

== Club career ==
He played two seasons in the Russian Football National League for FC Dynamo Makhachkala and FC Mordovia Saransk.
