= Valeri Malyshev (footballer) =

Russian footballer

Personal information
- Full name: Valeri Mikhailovich Malyshev
- Date of birth: 27 March 1980 (age 46)
- Place of birth: Vladimir, Russian SFSR
- Height: 1.86 m (6 ft 1 in)
- Positions: Forward; midfielder

Senior career*
Years	Team	Apps	(Gls)
2001–2012	FC Torpedo Vladimir	322	(74)
2012	FC Tyumen	17	(1)
2013	FC Volga Tver	10	(0)
2013–2015	FC Torpedo Vladimir	64	(10)
- * Club domestic league appearances and goals

Valeri Mikhailovich Malyshev (Russian: Валерий Михайлович Малышев; born 27 March 1980) is a former Russian professional football player.

== Club career ==
He played in the Russian Football National League for FC Torpedo Vladimir in the 2011–12 season.
