= Anzor Daurbekov =

Russian footballer

Personal information
- Full name: Anzor Magomedovich Daurbekov
- Date of birth: 1 December 1977 (age 48)
- Height: 1.78 m (5 ft 10 in)
- Positions: Forward; midfielder

Senior career*
Years	Team	Apps	(Gls)
1996	PFC Spartak Nalchik	6	(1)
1996–1997	PFC Spartak-d Nalchik	39	(9)
1997	FC Angusht Nazran	19	(1)
1998	PFC Spartak Nalchik	16	(1)
1998–1999	FC Angusht Nazran	30	(1)
1999	PFC Spartak Nalchik	18	(0)
2000	FC Nart Nartkala	28	(3)
2001	FC Angusht Nazran	37	(1)
2002	PFC Spartak Nalchik	0	(0)
2002	FC Nart Nartkala	2	(1)
2003–2006	FC Angusht Nazran	89	(7)
2006	FC Sheksna Cherepovets	15	(2)
2009–2010	FC Angusht Nazran	39	(1)
2011	FC Biolog-Novokubansk Progress	2	(0)
- * Club domestic league appearances and goals

Anzor Magomedovich Daurbekov (Russian: Анзор Магомедович Даурбеков; born 1 December 1977) is a former Russian professional football player.

== Club career ==
He played 4 seasons in the Russian Football National League for PFC Spartak Nalchik and FC Angusht Nazran.
