= Dmitri Pinchuk =

Russian footballer (born 1984)

Personal information
- Full name: Dmitri Valentinovich Pinchuk
- Date of birth: 19 January 1984 (age 42)
- Height: 1.83 m (6 ft 0 in)
- Position: Forward

Senior career*
Years	Team	Apps	(Gls)
2001–2003	FC Shakhtyor Shakhty	76	(18)
2004–2005	FC Mashuk-KMV Pyatigorsk	45	(16)
2006	FC Dynamo Makhachkala	32	(4)
2007	FC Chernomorets Novorossiysk	27	(10)
2008	FC Olimpia Volgograd	15	(6)
2008–2009	FC Zhemchuzhina-Sochi	40	(12)
2010	FC Smena Komsomolsk-na-Amure	14	(2)
2010	FC Dynamo Vologda	8	(0)
2011	FC Slavyansky Slavyansk-na-Kubani	2	(0)
2013–2014	FC Taganrog	13	(3)
- * Club domestic league appearances and goals

Dmitri Valentinovich Pinchuk (Russian: Дмитрий Валентинович Пинчук; born 19 January 1984) is a former Russian professional football player.

== Club career ==
He played in the Russian Football National League for FC Dynamo Makhachkala in 2006.
