= Lokomotiv Stadium (Chita) =

Multi-use stadium in Chita, Russia

Coordinates: 52°02′26″N 113°28′22″E

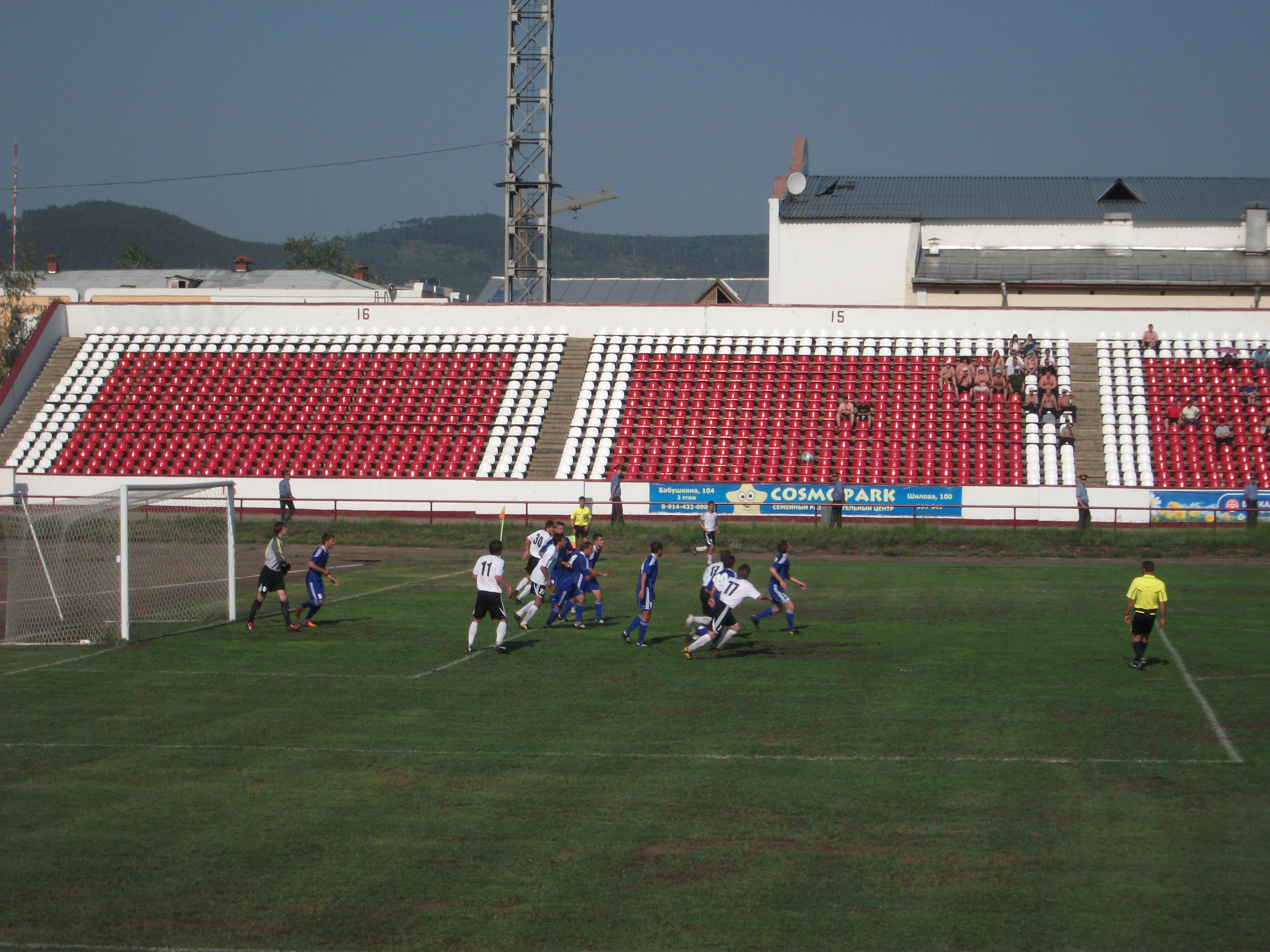
Game in progress at Lokomotiv Stadium

Lokomotiv Stadium is a multi-use stadium in Chita, Russia. It is used mostly for football matches. The stadium holds 12,500 people.
