= Sergei Marushko =

Russian footballer and referee

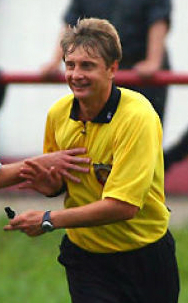

Personal information
- Full name: Sergei Vasilyevich Marushko
- Date of birth: 24 May 1966 (age 60)
- Place of birth: Novoderevyanovskaya, Russian SFSR
- Height: 1.86 m (6 ft 1 in)
- Position: Midfielder

Youth career
- FC Druzhba Novoderevyanovskaya

Senior career*
Years	Team	Apps	(Gls)
1983–1984	FC Kuban Krasnodar	3	(0)
1985–1986	FC SKA Rostov-on-Don	0	(0)
1986–1993	FC Krylia Sovetov Samara	229	(22)
1994	FC Lada Togliatti	0	(0)
1994	FC Krylia Sovetov Samara	0	(0)
1995	Visan Pallo	16	(0)

Managerial career
- 2010–2013: Samara Football Federation (president)
- 2016: FC Anzhi Makhachkala (vice director of sports)
- 2017–: Samara Football Federation (president)
- * Club domestic league appearances and goals

Sergei Vasilyevich Marushko (Russian: Серге́й Васильевич Марушко; born 24 May 1966) is a Russian professional football official and a former player and referee. He is the president of the Samara Football Federation.

== Club career ==
He made his professional debut in the Soviet First League in 1983 for FC Kuban Krasnodar.

== Post-playing career ==
After his retirement until 2007 he worked as a referee.
