= Denis Malinin =

Kazakhstani footballer

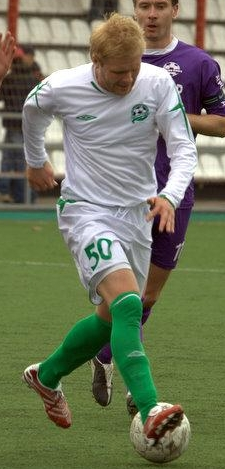

Personal information
- Full name: Denis Igorevich Malinin
- Date of birth: 11 June 1983 (age 43)
- Place of birth: Pavlodar, Kazakh SSR
- Height: 1.79 m (5 ft 10 1/2 in)
- Position: Forward

Senior career*
Years	Team	Apps	(Gls)
1999	FC Irtysh Pavlodar	4	(1)
2003	FC Lokomotiv Moscow (reserves)	11	(6)
2004	FC Luch-Energiya Vladivostok	5	(0)
2005–2006	FC Nika Moscow	54	(11)
2007	FC Zelenograd	14	(3)
2007	FK Vėtra	14	(1)
2008	FC Zhemchuzhina-Sochi Sochi	10	(1)
2009	FC Irtysh	8	(0)
2010	FC Kazakhmys	30	(16)

International career^{‡}
2009	Kazakhstan	1	(0)
- * Club domestic league appearances and goals as of 1 January 2010 ‡ National team caps and goals as of December 2009

Denis Igorevich Malinin (Russian: Денис Игоревич Малинин; born 11 June 1983) is a Kazakhstani professional footballer. As of 2009, he plays for FC Kazakhmys. He also holds Russian citizenship.
