= FC Fortuna Mytishchi =

- Full name: Football Club Fortuna Mytishchi
- Founded: 2003
- Dissolved: 2009

FC Fortuna Mytishchi (Russian: «Фортуна» (Мытищи)) was a Russian football team from Mytishchi. It played professionally in the Russian Second Division for one season in 2006, coming in 12th in the West Zone.
