= FC CFKiS Lobnya =

Russian football club

- Full name: Football Club Center of Physical Culture and Sport Lobnya
- Founded: 2000

FC CFKiS Lobnya (Russian: ЦФКиС Лобня) is a Russian football team from Lobnya. It played professionally from 2004 to 2007 in the Russian Second Division, their best result was 3rd place in the Center Zone of 2006.

== Team name history ==
- 2000–2003: FC Alla-L Lobnya
- 2004–2007: FC Lobnya-Alla Lobnya
- 2008–2012: FC Lobnya
- 2012: FC Lobnya-Vismut Lobnya
- 2013– : FC CFKiS Lobnya
