= FC Shakhtyor Prokopyevsk =

Russian football club

- Full name: Football Club Shakhtyor Prokopyevsk
- Founded: 1946
- League: Russian Second Division, Zone East
- 2007: 11th
Home colours	Away colours

FC Shakhtyor Prokopyevsk (Russian: «Шахтёр» (Прокопьевск)) is a Russian football club from Prokopyevsk that currently plays in amateur competitions. It played professionally in 1946, 1962–1970, 1972–1974, 1994–1996 and 2001–2007. It played for one season in the second-highest level (Soviet First League) in 1962.

== Team name history ==
- 1946 FC Ugolshchik Prokopyevsk
- 1962–1974 FC Shakhtyor Prokopyevsk
- 1992–1996 FC Motor Prokopyevsk
- 1997 FC Shakhtyor Prokopyevsk
- 1998–1999 FC Shakhtyor-PDZ Prokopyevsk
- 2000– FC Shakhtyor Prokopyevsk
