= FC Mostransgaz Gazoprovod =

Mostransgaz
- Full name: FC Mostransgaz Gazoprovod
- Founded: 2000
- Dissolved: 2003
- League: Russian Professional Football League Centre Zone
- 2002: 14th

FC Mostransgaz Gazoprovod (Russian: Футбольный клуб "Мострансгаз" Газопровод) is a defunct Russian association football club based in Moscow. Founded in 2000 in Moscow as "Dynamo-MGO-Mostransgaz". The club changed the name to "Mostransgaz" for the next two seasons (2001–2002). The club represented the settlement of Selyatino in the Moscow Oblast before moving the headquarters to Gazoprovod but still plays the home matches in Selyatino.

Mostransgaz was promoted to the Russian Professional Football League for the 2002 season, entering the Centre Zone and finished 14th place in the league out of 20 teams. Before the start of 2003 season, the club decided once again to change the name to "Medic" but due to the financial problems, they lost the status as a professional club due to the financial problems and finally was forced to disband, giving up the place in the PFL to FC Petrotrest Saint Petersburg for the 2003 season.

== Former players ==
see Category:FC Mostransgaz Gazoprovod players

== Achievements ==
Russian Cup: First Round (2002)

Highest Position ever: 14th place in the Centre Zone of the Russian Professional Football League
