= FC Yunit Samara =

- Full name: Football Club Yunit Samara
- Founded: 2005
- Dissolved: 2008
- League: Russian Second Division, Zone Ural-Povolzhye
- 2008: 17th

FC Yunit Samara (Russian: «Юнит» (Самара)) was a Russian football team from Samara. It played professionally from 2006 to 2008. Their best result was 9th place in Zone Ural-Povolzhye of the Russian Second Division in 2006.
