= FC Torpedo-ZIL Moscow (2003) =

Torpedo-ZIL
- Full name: Football Club Torpedo-ZIL
- Founded: 2003
- Dissolved: 2011
- Ground: Oktyabr Stadium
- Capacity: 3060
- League: Russian Second Division, Zone West
- 2010: 2nd
Home colours	Away colours

Historical logo of FC Torpedo-RG

FC Torpedo-ZIL was a Russian association football club from Moscow. The club, however, is related to but should not be confused with former Russian Premier League club FC Torpedo-ZIL, renamed Torpedo-Metallurg in 2003 (the club that later served as a base for the creation of FC Moscow). It was founded in 2003 under the name FC Torpedo-ZIL and was known as Torpedo-RG Moscow until 2009 when it was renamed back to Torpedo-ZIL. On April 3, 2009, ZiL bought FC Torpedo Moscow from their previous owner, Luzhniki. It was speculated at the time that the two teams could possibly be merged (ZiL was a minority owner in FC Torpedo-ZIL as of early 2009, with majority interest owned by Alexander Mamut). As deadline for 2009 registration passed, FC Torpedo Moscow was not reinstated in the Second Division and Torpedo-ZIL remained the only professional Torpedo for 2009.

In early 2011, after FC Saturn Moscow Oblast dropped out of the Russian Premier League for financial reasons, its place was taken up by FC Krasnodar, creating a vacancy in the Russian First Division. Torpedo-ZIL applied for the spot. After it was announced the spot will be awarded to FC Fakel Voronezh, Torpedo-ZIL owner Alexander Mamut announced that Torpedo-ZIL will be disbanded.

== History ==
The club was founded as a joint foundation by the Russian newspaper "Rossiyskaya Gazeta" and the automobile plant "ZIL", the company that previously owned FC Torpedo-ZIL. The club started in the local regional Moscow championship, but was eventually promoted to the Russian Second Division.
