= FC Spartak-UGP Anapa =

- Full name: FC Spartak-UGP Anapa
- Founded: 1986; 40 years ago
- Dissolved: 2009; 17 years ago
- 2008: Russian Second Division, Zone South, 17th
Home colours	Away colours

FC Spartak-UGP Anapa (Russian: ФК «Спартак-УГП» Анапа) was a Russian football team from Anapa. UGP stands for their sponsor, Gazprom subsidiary Urengoygazprom. It existed from 1986 to early 2009 and played professionally from 1988 to 1998, 2001 to 2003 and 2005 to 2008 (including a stint in the Russian First Division in 1992 and 1993). In early 2009 it was dissolved due to financial problems. It was called Dynamo Anapa (1986–1987), Gekris Anapa (1995), FC Anapa (1998–1999) and Spartak Anapa (1988–1994, 1996–1997, 2000–2003).
