= FC Krasnodar-2000 =

Defunct Russian association football club

- Full name: Football Club Krasnodar-2000
- Founded: 2000
- Dissolved: 2011
- Ground: Trud
- League: Russian Second Division; Zone South
- 2010: 5th

FC Krasnodar-2000 (Russian: ФК "Краснодар-2000") was a Russian association football club from Krasnodar, founded in 2000 and dissolved in 2011. It played in the Russian Second Division from 2001 to 2010. It was founded as FC Tsentr-R-Kavkaz Krasnodar and renamed to Krasnodar-2000 in their first season on the professional level in 2001. In 2011 the remains of the club were integrated in FC Kavkaztransgaz-2005 Ryzdvyany.
