= FC Volochanin-Ratmir Vyshny Volochyok =

Russian football club

- Full name: Football Club Volochanin-Ratmir Vyshny Volochyok
- Founded: 1989
- Ground: Spartak Stadium
- Capacity: 5000
- Chairman: Artur Babushkin
- Manager: Yevgeni Kotelnikov
- League: Russian Second Division, Zone West
- 2011–12: 16th
Home colours	Away colours

FC Volochanin-Ratmir Vyshny Volochyok (Russian: ФК «Волочанин-Ратмир» Вышний Волочёк) is an association football club from Vyshny Volochyok, Russia, founded in 1989. It spent many seasons in the Russian Second Division. It played professionally from 1991 and was called, in the past, FC Volochanin Vyshny Volochyok (1989–1998), FC Volochanin-89 Vyshny Volochyok (1999–2002). As of September 2012, the team plays in the Russian amateur championship, Golden Ring zone.

The appearances record holder (more than 400 matches) of the club is Nikolai Trunev. Among noted players of the team was Vitaliy Abramov, who played at Russian and Ukrainian top level and had one international cap for Kazakhstan.
