= FC Spartak-MZhK Ryazan =

- Full name: FC Spartak-MZhK Ryazan; Футбольный клуб «Спартак-МЖК»
- Founded: 2004
- Dissolved: 2007
- Ground: CSK Stadium, Ryazan
- Capacity: 25,000
- 2007: Russian First Division, 22nd
Home colours	Away colours

FC Spartak-MZhK Ryazan (Russian: ФК «Спартак-МЖК» Рязань) was a Russian football club based in Ryazan.

The club founded in 2004 was sponsored by "Mervinsky dwelling concern" (Мервинский жилищный концерн, abbr. МЖК). In 2004 season the team played in Amateur Football League, winning zone "Golden Ring" championship and cup. In 2005 season it played in Second Division finishing at 6th place in zone Center. In 2006 season it won zone Center of Second Division and was promoted to First Division. In 2007 season it played only half of tournament and was at last place after playing a half, then it withdrew from tournament because of financial reasons and was dissolved.

The president of the club was Evgeniy Malyutin.

== Head coaches ==
- Boris Zhuravlyov (2005)
- Leonid Nazarenko (2005–06)
- Ilya Tsymbalar (2006)
- Sergei Tashuev (2007)
- Gela Prishvin (caretaker) (2007)
- Yuri Bykov (2007)
