= FC Lokomotiv Liski =

Russian football club

- Full name: Football Club Lokomotiv Liski
- Founded: 1936
- Ground: Lokomotiv Stadium
- Capacity: 4,189
- Owner: Liskinskoye PATP / Liskinsky District
- Chairman: Boris Menyaylov
- Manager: Artem Struchkov
- League: Russian Amateur Football League
- 2015–16: RFPL, Zone Center, 6th

FC Lokomotiv Liski (Russian: ФК "Локомотив" Лиски) is a Russian association football club from Liski, founded in 1936. It first played on the professional league level in 1995. The highest level it achieved was the third-tier Russian Professional Football League, where it played from 2009 to 2015–16. It dropped out of professional-level competitions before the 2016–17 season.
