= FC Amur Blagoveshchensk =

Amur Blagoveshchensk
- Full name: Football Club Amur Blagoveshchensk
- Founded: 1960
- Dissolved: 2010
- Ground: Amur Stadium
- Capacity: 13,000
- League: Russian Second Division, Zone East

FC Amur Blagoveshchensk (Russian: ФК «Амур» Благовещенск) was a Russian football club from Blagoveshchensk, founded in 1960 and dissolved in 2010.

The club played on the second-highest level (Soviet First League and Russian First Division) in 1960–1962, 1992 and 2005. Between 1997 and 2001, it was called FC Amur-Energiya. On 17 September 2009, FC Amur was excluded from the Russian Second Division for skipping two away games. At the time, it was 9th in the table with 12 points in 20 games. The club was officially dissolved.

A new club called FC Amur-2010 was established. It advanced to the Russian Second Division for the 2011 season. After the 2013–14 season, FC Amur-2010 was also dissolved. Another new club called FC Amur Blagoveshchensk plays in regional amateur competitions as of 2026.
