= FC Nara-ShBFR Naro-Fominsk =

Russian football club

- Full name: Football Club Nara-ShBFR Naro-Fominsk
- Founded: 1994
- Dissolved: 2011
- Ground: Nara Stadium
- Capacity: 3,038
- League: –
- 2010: 12th (Russian Second Division, Zone West)
Home colours

FC Nara-ShBFR Naro-Fominsk (Russian: ФК «Нара-ШБФР» Наро-Фоминск) is an association football club from Naro-Fominsk, Russia, founded in 1994. It played in the Russian Second Division (zone West) in 2005–2010. The team was called in the past Shelkovik Naro-Fominsk (1994–2004) and Nara-Desna Naro-Fominsk (2005–2007). Another Naro-Fominsk team, Trud Naro-Fominsk, played professionally in 1968 and 1969. ShBFR stands for "Школа Бразильского Футбола России" (Russian School of Brazilian Football).
