= 2009 Russian Second Division =

Russian Second Division
- Season: 2009

The 2009 Russian Second Division was the third strongest division in Russian football. The Second Division is geographically divided into 5 zones. The winners of each zone are automatically promoted into the First Division. The bottom finishers of each zone lose professional status and are relegated into the Amateur Football League.

== South ==
Team	Location	Head Coach	Venue	Capacity	Position in 2008	Official site
FC Abinsk	Abinsk	(Armenia) Kalin Stepanyan	Abinsk Stadium		1st, LFL-"South"	
Avtodor	Vladikavkaz	(Russia) Georgi Botsiyev	"SOK" im. E. Tedeeva	3,000	18th, "South"	
Angusht	Nazran	(Russia) Umar Markhiyev	Tsentralny	3,200	13th, LFL-"South"	
FC Astrakhan	Astrakhan	(Russia) Sergei Popkov	Gorodskoy	5,000	14th, "South"	
Bataysk-2007	Bataysk	(Russia) Aleksandr Vorobyev	Lokomotiv	3,000	2nd, "South"	
Volgograd	Volgograd	(Russia) Valeri Burlachenko	Olimpia Stadium	3,000		
Dagdizel	Kaspiysk	(Russia) Magomed-Rasul Akhmedov	Trud	1,500	7th, "South"	
Druzhba	Maykop	(Russia) Soferbi Yeshugov	Druzhba	7,000	10th, "South"	
Zhemchuzhina-Sochi	Sochi	(Russia) Oleg Vasilenko	Tsentralny	10,200	6th, "South"	
Kavkaztransgaz-2005	Ryzdvyany	(Russia) Sergei Ponomaryov	Fakel	1,500	8th, "South"	
Krasnodar-2000	Krasnodar	(Russia) Igor Zakharyak	Yunost	1,000	15th, "South"	
Mashuk-KMV	Pyatigorsk	(Russia) Yuri Svirkov	Tsentralny	10,365	19th, D1	
Rotor	Volgograd	(Russia) Igor Menshchikov	Tsentralny	32,216	13th, "South"	
SKA	Rostov-on-Don	(Russia) Igor Khankeyev	SKA SKVO	27,300	13th, D1	
FC Stavropol	Stavropol	(Russia) Boris Stukalov	Dynamo	15,982	2nd, LFL-"South"	
Stavropolye-2009	Stavropol	(Russia) Anatoli Shelest	Dynamo	15,982		
FC Taganrog	Taganrog	(Russia) Aleksei Sereda	Torpedo	3,500	12th, "South"	
Torpedo	Armavir	(Armenia) Arsen Papikyan	Yunost	5,000		
Energiya	Volzhsky	(Russia) Dmitri Petrenko	Loginov Stadium	7,500	9th, "South"	

FC Abinsk were excluded from the league for failing to fulfil two fixtures (on 28 June and 5 July). They have played 14 matches and were in the 18th position with 5 points. Results of Abinsk were discarded.

On 31 July 2009 Oleg Mikheyev, president of FC Rotor Volgograd, announced Rotor's resignation from the league, citing problems with authorities. They have played 18 games and were in the 13th position with 21 points.

Location of teams

=== Standings ===
Pos	Team	Pld	W	D	L	GF	GA	GD	Pts	Promotion or relegation
1	Zhemchuzhina-Sochi (C, P)	34	29	2	3	91	22	+69	89	Promotion to First Division
2	Stavropol	34	22	5	7	66	37	+29	71	Excluded from professional football
3	Volgograd (P)	34	21	7	6	65	28	+37	70	Promotion to First Division
4	Armavir	34	19	6	9	54	32	+22	63	
5	Avtodor Vladikavkaz	34	15	12	7	47	38	+9	57	
6	Mashuk-KMV Pyatigorsk	34	15	8	11	45	39	+6	53	
7	Energiya Volzhsky	34	12	12	10	41	33	+8	48	
8	Bataysk-2007	34	12	9	13	43	39	+4	45	
9	Krasnodar-2000	34	11	12	11	40	43	−3	45	
10	Astrakhan	34	11	10	13	36	39	−3	43	
11	Druzhba Maykop	34	12	6	16	45	47	−2	42	
12	SKA Rostov-on-Don	34	11	9	14	49	61	−12	42	
13	Stavropolye-2009	34	10	11	13	45	44	+1	41	
14	Dagdizel Kaspiysk	34	11	5	18	46	65	−19	38	
15	Kavkaztransgaz-2005 Ryzdvyany	34	10	3	21	28	54	−26	33	
16	Angusht Nazran	34	8	7	19	36	61	−25	31	
17	Rotor Volgograd	34	5	6	23	23	72	−49	21	
18	Taganrog	34	4	6	24	27	73	−46	18	

Source: PFL
Rules for classification: 1st points; 2nd matches won; 3rd head-to-head (points, matches won, goal difference, goals scored, away goals scored); 4th goal difference; 5th goals scored; 6th away goals scored
(C) Champions; (P) Promoted

=== Top scorers ===
Source: [PFL] (in Russian), Sporbox.ru (in Russian)

23 goals

- Aleksei Zhdanov (Volgograd) (3 - from penalty kick)

22 goals

- Stanislav Dubrovin (Zhemchuzhina-Sochi) (4 - from penalty kick)

20 goals

- Robert Zebelyan (Zhemchuzhina-Sochi) (1 - from penalty kick)

19 goals

- Sergei Verkashanskiy (Torpedo Armavir) (7 - from penalty kick)

16 goals

- Azamat Kurachinov (Stavropol) (6 - from penalty kick)

13 goals

- Mikhail Markosov (SKA / Stavropol)
- Stanislav Lebedintsev (SKA) (1 - from penalty kick)
- Mikhail Surshkov (Druzhba) (2 - from penalty kick)

12 goals

- Ivan Grinyuk (Bataysk-2007)
- Timirlan Shavanov (Dagdizel) (2 - from penalty kick)

== West ==
Location of teams. Not shown: Sever (further north)

=== Standings ===
Pos	Team	Pld	W	D	L	GF	GA	GD	Pts	Promotion or relegation
1	Dynamo St. Petersburg (C, P)	36	24	7	5	63	28	+35	79	Promotion to First Division
2	Torpedo Vladimir	36	22	7	7	59	25	+34	73	
3	Spartak Kostroma	36	19	10	7	47	27	+20	67	
4	Istra	36	18	8	10	56	42	+14	62	
5	Lokomotiv-2 Moscow	36	16	10	10	62	38	+24	58	
6	Sever Murmansk	36	16	8	12	57	56	+1	56	
7	Volga Tver	36	15	10	11	47	45	+2	55	
8	Dynamo Vologda	36	14	11	11	52	40	+12	53	
9	Volochanin-Ratmir Vyshny Volochyok	36	12	16	8	52	38	+14	52	
10	Dmitrov	36	14	8	14	40	36	+4	50	Excluded from professional football
11	Zelenograd	36	13	9	14	44	43	+1	48	
12	Pskov-747 Pskov	36	12	12	12	51	48	+3	48	
13	Sheksna Cherepovets	36	11	13	12	44	45	−1	46	
14	Torpedo-ZIL Moscow	36	11	9	16	35	43	−8	42	
15	Nara-ShBFR Naro-Fominsk	36	10	12	14	47	55	−8	42	
16	Smena-Zenit St. Petersburg	36	10	9	17	36	52	−16	39	Excluded from professional football
17	Tekstilshchik Ivanovo	36	8	10	18	43	65	−22	34	
18	Sportakademklub Moscow	36	7	9	20	43	67	−24	30	
19	Spartak Shchyolkovo (R)	36	0	2	34	9	93	−84	2	Relegation to Amateur Football League (Note: On 11 July 2009, the management of FC Spartak Shchyolkovo announced that the club would resign from the league after the first half of the season because of economic problems. Spartak were excluded from the league on August 4, 2009. They have played 18 games and were in the last, 19th position with 2 points.)

Source: PFL
Rules for classification: 1st points; 2nd matches won; 3rd head-to-head (points, matches won, goal difference, goals scored, away goals scored); 4th goal difference; 5th goals scored; 6th away goals scored
(C) Champions; (P) Promoted; (R) Relegated

=== Top scorers ===
Source: [PFL] (in Russian)

17 goals

- Andrei Opanasyuk (Dynamo Vologda)

16 goals

- Azamat Gonezhukov (Dynamo St. Petersburg)
- Vadim Klass (Sever)

15 goals

- Artyom Lopatkin (Tekstilshchik)
- Anton Proshin (Spartak Kostroma)
- Dmitri Vyazmikin (Torpedo Vladimir)

13 goals

- Yuri Kapusta (Nara-ShBFR)
- Anton Kryuchkov (Volochanin-Ratmir)
- Stanislav Murygin (Istra)

12 goals

- Sergei Lokhanov (Volochanin-Ratmir)
- Maksim Protserov (Dynamo St. Petersburg)
- Vladimir Svizhuk (Istra)

== Center ==
First games on April 22, last games on October 28.

Location of teams

=== Standings ===
Pos	Team	Pld	W	D	L	GF	GA	GD	Pts	Promotion or relegation
1	Avangard Kursk (C, P)	32	24	1	7	68	23	+45	73	Promotion to First Division
2	Dynamo Bryansk (P)	32	20	9	3	57	22	+35	69	Promotion to First Division
3	Avangard Podolsk	32	21	4	7	50	17	+33	67	
4	Gubkin	32	18	4	10	51	29	+22	58	
5	Zodiak-Oskol Stary Oskol	32	17	5	10	51	41	+10	56	
6	Lokomotiv Liski	32	16	8	8	43	21	+22	56	
7	Rusichi Oryol	32	15	6	11	48	36	+12	51	
8	Ryazan	32	13	6	13	39	34	+5	45	Excluded from professional football
9	Spartak Tambov	32	12	8	12	41	45	−4	44	
10	Zvezda Serpukhov	32	12	5	15	45	47	−2	41	Excluded from professional football
11	FSA Voronezh	32	11	6	15	44	48	−4	39	Excluded from professional football
12	Saturn Moscow Oblast	32	10	8	14	35	38	−3	38	
13	Dnepr Smolensk	32	9	10	13	31	33	−2	37	
14	Znamya Truda Orekhovo-Zuyevo	32	9	6	17	38	50	−12	33	
15	Fakel Voronezh	32	9	4	19	26	55	−29	31 (Note: Fakel and Yelets were excluded from the league for attempts to bribe and threaten the referee on 18 July. At the time of exclusion (21 August), Fakel were sixth with 31 points from 19 games, while Yelets were 16th with 9 points from 19 games.)	
16	Nika Moscow	32	4	5	23	20	86	−66	17	
17	Yelets (R)	32	2	3	27	8	70	−62	9	Relegation to Amateur Football League

Source: PFL
Rules for classification: 1st points; 2nd matches won; 3rd head-to-head (points, matches won, goal difference, goals scored, away goals scored); 4th goal difference; 5th goals scored; 6th away goals scored
(C) Champions; (P) Promoted; (R) Relegated

=== Top scorers ===
Source: [PFL] (in Russian)

17 goals

- Mikhail Tyufyakov (Dynamo Bryansk)

16 goals

- Sergei Faustov (FC Gubkin)

13 goals

- Aleksei Gavrilov (Ryazan)

12 goals

- Kirill Makarov (FSA)

11 goals

- Igor Borozdin (Avangard Kursk)
- Andrei Meshchaninov (Zvezda)

== Ural-Povolzhye ==
Location of teams. Not shown: Tyumen (further east)

=== Standings ===
Pos	Team	Pld	W	D	L	GF	GA	GD	Pts	Promotion or relegation
1	Mordovia Saransk (C, P)	30	24	5	1	68	13	+55	77	Promotion to First Division
2	Gornyak Uchaly	30	17	6	7	42	25	+17	57	
3	SOYUZ-Gazprom Izhevsk	30	17	4	9	42	25	+17	55	
4	Volga Ulyanovsk	30	15	10	5	44	27	+17	55	
5	Chelyabinsk	30	15	8	7	49	18	+31	53 (Note: CHE 1–1 TYU ; TYU 2–2 CHE)	
6	Tyumen	30	15	8	7	54	32	+22	53	
7	Gazovik Orenburg	30	14	3	13	43	29	+14	45	
8	Lada-Togliatti	30	12	8	10	36	35	+1	44	Excluded from professional football
9	Bashinformsvyaz-Dynamo Ufa	30	12	7	11	40	40	0	43	
10	Khimik Dzerzhinsk	30	13	3	14	32	44	−12	42	
11	Sokol Saratov	30	10	7	13	30	41	−11	37	
12	Togliatti	30	8	8	14	32	43	−11	32	Excluded from professional football
13	Dynamo Kirov	30	6	5	19	28	50	−22	23	
14	Neftekhimik Nizhnekamsk	30	5	6	19	32	72	−40	21	
15	Rubin-2 Kazan	30	3	8	19	20	53	−33	17	
16	Akademiya Dimitrovgrad	30	4	4	22	25	71	−46	16	

Source: PFL
Rules for classification: 1st points; 2nd matches won; 3rd head-to-head (points, matches won, goal difference, goals scored, away goals scored); 4th goal difference; 5th goals scored; 6th away goals scored
(C) Champions; (P) Promoted

=== Top scorers ===
Source: [PFL] (in Russian)

19 goals

- Ruslan Mukhametshin (SOYUZ-Gazprom / Mordovia)

14 goals

- Ivan Luzhnikov (Mordovia / FC Tyumen)
- Dmitri Sysuyev (Mordovia)

13 goals

- Marat Shogenov (Gazovik)

12 goals

- Vitali Burmakov (Volga Ulyanovsk)

11 goals

- Marat Safin (Volga Ulyanovsk)
- Dmitri Zarva (FC Tyumen)

== East ==
Location of teams

=== Standings ===
Pos	Team	Pld	W	D	L	GF	GA	GD	Pts	Promotion or relegation
1	Irtysh Omsk (C, P)	27	17	6	4	49	20	+29	57	Promotion to First Division
2	Dynamo Barnaul	27	16	4	7	41	28	+13	52	
3	Metallurg Krasnoyarsk	27	15	5	7	51	27	+24	50	
4	Metallurg-Kuzbass Novokuznetsk	27	14	8	5	52	32	+20	50	
5	Sibiryak Bratsk	27	12	3	12	36	48	−12	39	
6	Smena Komsomolsk-na-Amure	27	9	10	8	35	30	+5	37	
7	Sakhalin Yuzhno-Sakhalinsk	27	8	8	11	29	28	+1	32 (Note: KUZ 1–0 SAKH ; SAKH 2–0 KUZ; KUZ 0–1 SAKH)	
8	KUZBASS Kemerovo	27	8	8	11	32	36	−4	32	
9	Okean Nakhodka	27	3	4	20	21	53	−32	13	
10	Amur Blagoveshchensk (R)	27	2	6	19	23	67	−44	12	Relegation to Amateur Football League (Note: On September 10, director general of FC Amur Blagoveshchensk announced resignation from the league because of large debts and impossibility to fund trips to away matches. Amur was excluded from the Russian Second Division on September 17. At the time it was 9th in the table with 12 points in 20 games.)

Source: PFL
Rules for classification: 1st points; 2nd matches won; 3rd head-to-head (points, matches won, goal difference, goals scored, away goals scored); 4th goal difference; 5th goals scored; 6th away goals scored
(C) Champions; (P) Promoted; (R) Relegated

=== Top scorers ===
Source: [PFL] (in Russian)

15 goals

- Valentin Yegunov (Metallurg-Kuzbass)

14 goals

- Yevgeni Yaroslavtsev (Metallurg-Kuzbass)

11 goals

- Anton Bagayev (Irtysh)

10 goals

- Aleksei Alekseyevtsev (Sakhalin)
- Stanislav Goncharov (Metallurg)
- Dmitri Turutin (Sibiryak)

8 goals

- Aleksei Bazanov (Metallurg)
- Dmitri Galin (Sibiryak)
- Maksim Galiullin (Dynamo Barnaul)
- Aleksei Martynov (Metallurg)
- Anton Vasilyev (Irtysh)

== Awards ==
On November 25, 2009, Professional Football League announced the award winners for the season.

Zone West

- Best player: Dmitri Vyazmikin (FC Torpedo Vladimir).
- Best goalkeeper: Andrei Romanov (FC Spartak Kostroma).
- Best defender: (Azerbaijan) Emin Agaev (FC Volga Tver).
- Best midfielder: Aleksei Melyoshin (FC Torpedo-ZIL Moscow).
- Best striker: Andrei Opanasyuk (FC Dynamo Vologda).
- Best manager: (Belarus) Eduard Malofeyev (FC Dynamo Saint-Petersburg).

Zone Center

- Best player: Mikhail Tyufyakov (FC Dynamo Bryansk).
- Best goalkeeper: Valeri Chizhov (FC Avangard Kursk).
- Best defender: Maksim Tishchenko (FC Avangard Kursk).
- Best midfielder: Igor Borozdin (FC Avangard Kursk).
- Best striker: Mikhail Tyufyakov.
- Best manager: Valeri Yesipov (FC Avangard Kursk).

Zone South

- Best player: Oleg Veretennikov (FC Volgograd).
- Best goalkeeper: Aleksandr Chikhradze (FC Zhemchuzhina-Sochi).
- Best defender: Konstantin Gordiyuk (FC Zhemchuzhina-Sochi).
- Best midfielder: Oleg Veretennikov.
- Best striker: Aleksei Zhdanov (FC Volgograd).
- Best manager: Oleg Vasilenko (FC Zhemchuzhina-Sochi).

Zone Ural-Povolzhye

- Best player: Ruslan Mukhametshin (FC Mordovia Saransk).
- Best goalkeeper: Fyodor Dyachenko (FC Mordovia Saransk).
- Best defender: Aleksei Muldarov (FC Mordovia Saransk).
- Best midfielder: Marat Shogenov (FC Gazovik Orenburg).
- Best striker: Ruslan Mukhametshin.
- Best manager: Fyodor Shcherbachenko (FC Mordovia Saransk).

Zone East

- Best player: Valentin Yegunov (FC Metallurg-Kuzbass Novokuznetsk).
- Best goalkeeper: Aleksei Krasnokutskiy (FC Irtysh Omsk).
- Best defender: Sergei Pyatikopov (FC Metallurg Krasnoyarsk).
- Best midfielder: Yevgeni Andreyev (FC Irtysh Omsk).
- Best striker: Valentin Yegunov.
- Best manager: Aleksandr Ivchenko (FC Metallurg Krasnoyarsk).
