= 2010–11 Russian Cup =

Tournament details
- Country: Russia

Final positions
- Champions: CSKA Moscow (6th title)
- Runners-up: Alania Vladikavkaz

Tournament statistics
- Top goal scorer(s): Seydou Doumbia; Maksim Bondarenko (4 goals)

The 2010–11 Russian Cup was the nineteenth season of the Russian football knockout tournament since the dissolution of the Soviet Union. The competition started on 14 April 2010, and ended with the final on 22 May 2011 at Shinnik Stadium in Yaroslavl, won by CSKA Moscow 2–1 over Alania Vladikavkaz. Uniquely, Alania's goal in the final was their only goal in the competition—they did not score in regulation or in extra time in any of their previous matches, winning all of those contests in penalty shootouts.

== First round ==
This round featured 2 Second Division teams. The game was played on 14 April 2010.

=== Section South ===
Team 1	Score	Team 2
Avtodor Vladikavkaz (III)	3–1	Beslan-FAYUR Beslan (III)

== Second round ==
In this round entered 1 winner from the first round and the 56 Second Division teams and 5 amateur teams. The matches were played between 25 April and 3 May 2010.

=== Section West ===
Team 1	Score	Team 2
Pskov-747 Pskov (III)	3–0	Dnepr Smolensk (III)
FC Zelenograd (III)	1–0	Volochanin-Ratmir Vyshny Volochyok (III)
Torpedo-ZIL Moscow (III)	3–1	Sportakademklub Moscow (III)
Nara-ShBFR Naro-Fominsk (III)	0–1	Podolye Podolsky District (IV)
Spartak Kostroma (III)	1–1 (a.e.t.) (5–4 p)	Dynamo Kostroma (III)
Sheksna Cherepovets (III)	3–1	Dynamo Vologda (III)
Kooperator Vichuga (IV)	1–1 (a.e.t.) (1–3 p)	Tekstilshchik Ivanovo (III)

=== Section Center ===
Team 1	Score	Team 2
Znamya Truda Orekhovo-Zuyevo (III)	0–1 (a.e.t.)	Saturn-2 Moscow Oblast (III)
Nika Moscow (III)	1–2	Torpedo Moscow (III)
Zvezda Ryazan (III)	2–1	FC Kaluga (III)
Fakel Voronezh (III)	0–1	Lokomotiv Liski (III)

=== Section East ===
Team 1	Score	Team 2
Dynamo Barnaul (III)	1–0	Dynamo Biysk (IV)
Metallurg-Kuzbass Novokuznetsk (III)	1–0	KUZBASS Kemerovo (III)
Radian-Baikal Irkutsk (III)	2–0	FC Chita (III)
Sibiryak Bratsk (III)	4–1	Metallurg-Yenisey Krasnoyarsk (III)
Mostovik-Primorye Ussuriysk (III)	2–0	ShVSM Yakutsk (IV)

=== Section South ===
Team 1	Score	Team 2
Energiya Volzhsky (III)	0–4	SKA Rostov-on-Don (III)
FC Astrakhan (III)	0–0 (a.e.t.) (4–3 p)	Dagdizel Kaspiysk (III)
Torpedo Armavir (III)	4–1	MITOS Novocherkassk (III)
Bataysk-2007 (III)	4–1	FC Taganrog (III)
Chernomorets Novorossiysk (III)	2–0	Druzhba Maykop (III)
Dynamo Stavropol (III)	2–0	Krasnodar-2000 (III)
Mashuk-KMV Pyatigorsk (III)	3–1	Avtodor Vladikavkaz
Kavkaztransgaz-2005 Ryzdvyany (III)	1–2	Angusht Nazran (III)

=== Section Ural-Povolzhye ===
Team 1	Score	Team 2
Akademiya Togliatti (III)	0–1	Sokol Saratov (III)
Dynamo Kirov (III)	2–1 (a.e.t.)	Khimik Dzerzhinsk (III)
Neftekhimik Nizhnekamsk (III)	1–1 (a.e.t.) (1–4 p)	Rubin-2 Kazan (III)
SOYUZ-Gazprom Izhevsk (III)	2–1	Oktan Perm (IV)
Gazovik Orenburg (III)	2–1	Nosta Novotroitsk (III)
Bashinformsvyaz-Dynamo Ufa (III)	0–0 (a.e.t.) (2–4 p)	Gornyak Uchaly (III)
FC Chelyabinsk (III)	0–0 (a.e.t.) (2–0 p)	FC Tyumen (III)

== Third round ==
In this round entered 31 winners from the second round and the 17 Second Division teams. The matches were played between 3 and 24 May 2010.

=== Section West ===
Team 1	Score	Team 2
Sever Murmansk (III)	0–0 (a.e.t.) (4–5 p)	Pskov-747 Pskov
Volga Tver (III)	1–0	FC Zelenograd
Lokomotiv-2 Moscow (III)	3–2	Torpedo-ZIL Moscow
Podolye Podolsky District	0–2	FC Istra (III)
Spartak Kostroma	1–2 (a.e.t.)	Sheksna Cherepovets
Tekstilshchik Ivanovo	1–1 (a.e.t.) (3–4 p)	Torpedo Vladimir (III)

=== Section Center ===
Team 1	Score	Team 2
Saturn-2 Moscow Oblast	3–1 (a.e.t.)	Vityaz Podolsk (III)
Torpedo Moscow	1–0	Avangard Podolsk (III)
Rusichi Oryol (III)	0–1	Zvezda Ryazan
Spartak Tambov (III)	1–3	Zenit Penza (III)
Lokomotiv Liski	0–1	Metallurg Lipetsk (III)
Metallurg-Oskol Stary Oskol (III)	0–2	Gubkin (III)

=== Section South ===
Team 1	Score	Team 2
SKA Rostov-on-Don	0–1	FC Astrakhan
Bataysk-2007	0–2	Torpedo Armavir
Dynamo Stavropol	0–3	Chernomorets Novorossiysk
Angusht Nazran	1–0 (a.e.t.)	Mashuk-KMV Pyatigorsk

=== Section Ural-Povolzhye ===
Team 1	Score	Team 2
Sokol Saratov	2–1	Volga Ulyanovsk (III)
Rubin-2 Kazan	0–1	Dynamo Kirov
Gazovik Orenburg	4–0	SOYUZ-Gazprom Izhevsk
Gornyak Uchaly	2–0	FC Chelyabinsk

=== Section East ===
Team 1	Score	Team 2
Dynamo Barnaul	2–0	Metallurg-Kuzbass Novokuznetsk
Sibiryak Bratsk	0–6	Radian-Baikal Irkutsk
Okean Nakhodka (III)	3–2 (a.e.t.)	Mostovik-Primorye Ussuriysk
Sakhalin Yuzhno-Sakhalinsk (III)	2–0	Smena Komsomolsk-na-Amure (III)

== Fourth round ==
In this round entered 24 winners from the third round. The matches were played between 5 and 15 June 2010.

=== Section West ===
Team 1	Score	Team 2
Pskov-747 Pskov	1–0	Volga Tver
FC Istra	2–1	Lokomotiv-2 Moscow
Torpedo Vladimir	1–0	Sheksna Cherepovets

=== Section Center ===
Team 1	Score	Team 2
Torpedo Moscow	3–0	Saturn-2 Moscow Oblast
Zenit Penza	0–1	Zvezda Ryazan
Metallurg Lipetsk	2–0	Gubkin

=== Section South ===
Team 1	Score	Team 2
Torpedo Armavir	3–0	FC Astrakhan
Chernomorets Novorossiysk	3–1	Angusht Nazran

=== Section Ural-Povolzhye ===
Team 1	Score	Team 2
Sokol Saratov	4–1	Dynamo Kirov
Gornyak Uchaly	2–1	Gazovik Orenburg

=== Section East ===
Team 1	Score	Team 2
Radian-Baikal Irkutsk	3–0	Dynamo Barnaul
Okean Nakhodka	0–2	Sakhalin Yuzhno-Sakhalinsk

== Fifth round ==
In this round entered 12 winners from the fourth round teams and the 20 First Division teams. The matches were played on 1 July 2010.

Team 1	Score	Team 2
FC Istra	0–0 (a.e.t.) (3–4 p)	Dynamo Saint Petersburg (II)
Pskov-747 Pskov	1–1 (a.e.t.) (4–2 p)	Baltika Kaliningrad (II)
Torpedo Moscow	1–1 (a.e.t.) (4–2 p)	FC Khimki (II)
Torpedo Vladimir	1–3	Shinnik Yaroslavl (II)
Metallurg Lipetsk	1–0	Dynamo Bryansk (II)
Zvezda Ryazan	0–2	Avangard Kursk (II)
Zhemchuzhina-Sochi (II)	0–1	FC Krasnodar (II)
Chernomorets Novorossiysk	2–1	Kuban Krasnodar (II)
Torpedo Armavir	0–0 (a.e.t.) (4–5 p)	Volgar-Gazprom Astrakhan (II)
Rotor Volgograd (II)	0–1 (a.e.t.)	Salyut Belgorod (II)
Sokol Saratov	0–3	Mordovia Saransk (II)
FC Nizhny Novgorod (II)	1–1 (a.e.t.) (0–3 p)	Volga Nizhny Novgorod (II)
Gornyak Uchaly	3–2 (a.e.t.)	Ural Sverdlovsk Oblast (II)
Irtysh Omsk (II)	0–2	KAMAZ Naberezhnye Chelny (II)
Sakhalin Yuzhno-Sakhalinsk	1–1 (a.e.t.) (3–2 p)	SKA-Energiya Khabarovsk (II)
Radian-Baikal Irkutsk	0–0 (a.e.t.) (2–3 p)	Luch-Energiya Vladivostok (II)

== Round of 32 ==
In this round entered the 16 winners from the fifth round matches and all Premier League teams. The matches were played on 13 and 14 July 2010.

13 July 2010	Luch-Energiya Vladivostok	4–0	Terek Grozny	Vladivostok
12:00 MST	Satalkin 45'; Bochkov 52' (pen.); Adayev 78' (o.g.); Yegorov 83'	Report		Stadium: Dynamo Stadium; Attendance: 4,900; Referee: Aleksei Yeskov

13 July 2010	Mordovia Saransk	1–2	Dynamo Moscow	Saransk
18:00 MST	Panchenko 72'	Report	Khokhlov 34'; Semshov 35'	Stadium: Svetotekhnika Stadium; Attendance: 13,000; Referee: German Kravchenko

13 July 2010	KAMAZ Naberezhnye Chelny	0–0 (a.e.t.) (2–4 p)	Alania Vladikavkaz	Naberezhnye Chelny
18:00 MST		Report		Stadium: KAMAZ Stadium; Attendance: 5,500; Referee: Vladimir Kazmenko
	Penalties
	Kozlov (penalty missed); Kobyalko (penalty scored); Krendelev (penalty scored); Serdyukov (penalty missed)		(penalty scored) Gabulov; (penalty scored) Florescu; (penalty scored) Khubulov; (penalty scored) Mashukov

13 July 2010	Shinnik Yaroslavl	2–1	Krylia Sovetov Samara	Yaroslavl
18:30 MST	Vještica 41' (pen.); Govorov 81'	Report	G. Drmić 39'	Stadium: Shinnik Stadium; Attendance: 4,200; Referee: Almir Kayumov

13 July 2010	Avangard Kursk	2–5 (a.e.t.)	Sibir Novosibirsk	Kursk
18:30 MST	Borozdin 8'; Borzenkov 10'	Report	Shevchenko 50', 115'; Molosh 83' (pen.); Medvedev 107'; Čížek 120'	Stadium: Trudovye Rezervy Stadium; Attendance: 5,500; Referee: Maksim Layushkin

13 July 2010	Dynamo Saint Petersburg	1–3	Zenit Saint Petersburg	Saint Petersburg
19:00 MST	Rogov 53' (pen.)	Report	Kanunnikov 16'; Rosina 56', 59'	Stadium: Petrovsky Stadium; Attendance: 10,500; Referee: Sergey Lapochkin

13 July 2010	Volga Nizhny Novgorod	5–0	Spartak Nalchik	Nizhny Novgorod
19:00 MST	Kozhanov 15'; Tursunov 22'; Martsvaladze 23'; Buivolov 36'; Mysin 89'	Report		Stadium: Lokomotiv Stadium; Attendance: 7,100; Referee: Aleksandr Kolobayev

13 July 2010	Metallurg Lipetsk	0–1	Spartak Moscow	Lipetsk
19:00 MST		Report	Alex 54' (pen.)	Stadium: Metallurg Stadium; Attendance: 14,000; Referee: Vitali Meshkov

13 July 2010	Volgar-Gazprom Astrakhan	1–0	Rubin Kazan	Astrakhan
19:00 MST	Marushchak 45'	Report		Stadium: Central Stadium; Attendance: 10,500; Referee: Aleksandr Gonchar

13 July 2010	Salyut Belgorod	0–4	FC Rostov	Belgorod
19:00 MST		Report	Adamov 75'; Akimov 82'; Khagush 87'; Lebedenko 89'	Stadium: Salyut Stadium; Attendance: 8,000; Referee: Vyacheslav Kharlamov

14 July 2010	Sakhalin Yuzhno-Sakhalinsk	1–1 (a.e.t.) (3–4 p)	Saturn Moscow Oblast	Yuzhno-Sakhalinsk
11:30 MST	Bondarenko 24'	Report	Jakubko 67'	Stadium: Kosmos Stadium; Attendance: 4,700; Referee: Sergey Sergeev
	Penalties
	Gerin (penalty scored); Antipov (penalty missed); Tyutyunnikov (penalty scored); Khinchagov (penalty scored); Familtsev (penalty missed)		(penalty scored) Boyarintsev; (penalty scored) Zinovich; (penalty scored) Anisimov; (penalty missed) Mots; (penalty scored) Jakubko

14 July 2010	Gornyak Uchaly	1–0	Lokomotiv Moscow	Uchaly
17:00 MST	Tokarev 60'	Report		Stadium: Gornyak Stadium; Attendance: 3,113; Referee: Aleksandr Yegorov

14 July 2010	Pskov-747 Pskov	1–2	Anzhi Makhachkala	Pskov
18:30 MST	Krupenin 45+'	Report	Timonov 22' (pen.); Krupenin 82' (o.g.)	Stadium: Lokomotiv Stadium; Attendance: 3,150; Referee: Denis Mareyev

14 July 2010	Torpedo Moscow	0–2	CSKA Moscow	Moscow
18:30 MST		Report	Guilherme 9', 12'	Stadium: Eduard Streltsov Stadium; Attendance: 9,000; Referee: Yevgeni Turbin

14 July 2010	Chernomorets Novorossiysk	0–1	Amkar Perm	Novorossiysk
19:30 MST		Report	Knežević 7' (pen.)	Stadium: Trud Stadium; Attendance: 9,000; Referee: Timur Arslanbekov

14 July 2010	FC Krasnodar	2–1 (a.e.t.)	Tom Tomsk	Krasnodar
20:00 MST	Picuşceac 8'; Tatarchuk 96'	Report	Dzyuba 42'	Stadium: Kuban Stadium; Attendance: 3,500; Referee: Mikhail Vilkov

== Round of 16 ==
In this round the 16 winners from the round of 32 round entered. The matches were played on 22 September 2010 and 3 March 2011.

22 September 2010	Alania Vladikavkaz	0–0 (a.e.t.) (5–4 p)	Gornyak Uchaly	Vladikavkaz
16:00		Report		Stadium: Republican Spartak Stadium; Attendance: 4,000; Referee: Vyacheslav Popov
	Penalties
	Florescu (penalty scored); Khubulov (penalty scored); Kirillov (penalty scored); Gusalov (penalty scored); Marenich (penalty scored)		(penalty scored) Ovchinnikov; (penalty scored) Sorokin; (penalty scored) Alborov; (penalty scored) Samoylov; (penalty missed) Khaliullin

22 September 2010	Saturn Moscow Oblast	2–1	Luch-Energiya Vladivostok	Ramenskoye
17:00	Topić 14', 25'	Report	Zhdanov 31'	Stadium: Saturn Stadium; Attendance: 4,500; Referee: Nikolai Ivanov

22 September 2010	FC Rostov	2–0	Volgar-Gazprom Astrakhan	Rostov-on-Don
18:30	Pavlenko 49', 63'	Report		Stadium: Olimp – 2 Attendance: 4,500; Referee: Vitali Meshkov

22 September 2010	Dynamo Moscow	4–1	Volga Nizhny Novgorod	Khimki
19:30	Česnauskis 43'; Semshov 60'; Dujmović 74'; Samedov 76'	Report	Martsvaladze 36'	Stadium: Arena Khimki; Attendance: 3,083; Referee: Vladimir Kazmenko

28 February 2011	CSKA Moscow	1–0	Shinnik Yaroslavl	Moscow
19:00	Ignashevich 22'	Report		Stadium: Luzhniki Stadium; Attendance: 6,000; Referee: Mikhail Vilkov

1 March 2011	Anzhi Makhachkala	2–3	Zenit Saint Petersburg	Grozny
18:00	Agalarov 22'; D. Ivanov 90'	Report	Huszti 12' (pen.); Danny 67'; Lazović 83'	Stadium: Sultan Bilimkhanov Stadium; Attendance: 2,500; Referee: Almir Kayumov
Note: Anzhi's home stadium in Makhachkala was ruled not fit for the game due to weather conditions.

3 March 2011	Sibir Novosibirsk	0–2	Spartak Moscow	Novosibirsk
16:00		Report	Dzyuba 11'; Yakovlev 49'	Stadium: Spartak Stadium; Attendance: 6,000; Referee: Vladimir Kazmenko

6 March 2011	Amkar Perm	0–1 (a.e.t.)	FC Krasnodar	Perm
13:00		Report	Picuşceac 98'	Stadium: Zvezda Stadium; Attendance: 8,800; Referee: Yuri Baskakov

== Quarter-finals ==
FC Alania Vladikavkaz received a bye and was automatically qualified for semifinals as their opponents, FC Saturn Moscow Oblast, went bankrupt in the winter of 2011.

20 April 2011	Dynamo Moscow	1–2	Rostov	Khimki
19:30	Sapeta 52'	Report	Grigoryev 32'; Blatnjak 90+2'	Stadium: Arena Khimki; Attendance: 5,200; Referee: Mikhail Vilkov

20 April 2011	Zenit Saint Petersburg	0–2	CSKA Moscow	Saint Petersburg
20:00		Report	Doumbia 41'; Ignashevich 58' (pen.)	Stadium: Petrovsky Stadium; Attendance: 19,000; Referee: Stanislav Sukhina

20 April 2011	Spartak Moscow	2–1	Krasnodar	Moscow
19:30	Rojo 69'; Welliton 72'	Report	Gogniyev 85'	Stadium: Luzhniki Stadium; Attendance: 15,911; Referee: Igor Egorov

== Semi-finals ==
11 May 2011	Spartak Moscow	3–3 (a.e.t.) (4–5 p)	CSKA Moscow	Moscow
19:30	D. Kombarov 45'; Ari 61'; Ibson 77'	Report	Necid 42'; Doumbia 72'; Vágner Love 82'	Stadium: Luzhniki Stadium; Attendance: 46,000; Referee: Igor Egorov
	Penalties
	Makhmudov (penalty scored); McGeady (penalty scored); D. Kombarov (penalty missed); Ari (penalty scored); Dzyuba (penalty scored)		(penalty scored) Necid; (penalty scored) Vágner Love; (penalty scored) Honda; (penalty scored) V. Berezutski; (penalty scored) Ignashevich

11 May 2011	Rostov	0–0 (a.e.t.) (5–6 p)	Alania Vladikavkaz	Rostov-on-Don
19:30		Report		Stadium: Olimp – 2 Attendance: 13,000; Referee: Sergei Karasyov
	Penalties
	Kirichenko (penalty scored); Rebko (penalty scored); M. Grigoryev (penalty scored); Blatnjak (penalty scored); Adamov (penalty scored); Boussaidi (penalty missed)		(penalty scored) Bazayev; (penalty scored) Gabulov; (penalty scored) Bikmaev; (penalty scored) Neco; (penalty scored) Vandinho; (penalty scored) A. Grigoryev

== Final ==
22 May 2011
19:00 MSK

CSKA Moscow	2–1	Alania Vladikavkaz
Doumbia 13', 69'	Report	Neco 23'

Shinnik Stadium, Yaroslavl
Attendance: 10,800
Referee: Vladislav Bezborodov

CSKA	Alania

GK	35	(Russia) Igor Akinfeev (c)
DF	4	(Russia) Sergei Ignashevich	(yellow card) 84'
DF	6	(Russia) Aleksei Berezutski
DF	14	(Russia) Kirill Nababkin
DF	24	(Russia) Vasili Berezutski
MF	10	(Russia) Alan Dzagoev	(substituted off) 65'
MF	17	(Russia) Pavel Mamayev	(substituted off) 89'
MF	21	(Serbia) Zoran Tošić	(substituted off) 83'
MF	22	(Russia) Evgeni Aldonin	(yellow card) 35'
MF	8	(Ivory Coast) Seydou Doumbia
FW	9	(Brazil) Vágner Love
Substitutes:
GK	1	(Russia) Sergei Chepchugov
DF	2	(Lithuania) Deividas Šemberas	(substituted on) 83'
MF	7	(Japan) Keisuke Honda	(substituted on) 65'
MF	19	(Latvia) Aleksandrs Cauņa
MF	25	(Bosnia and Herzegovina) Elvir Rahimić
FW	26	(Liberia) Sekou Oliseh
FW	89	(Czech Republic) Tomáš Necid	(substituted on) 89'
Manager:
(Russia) Leonid Slutsky Assistant referees: Anton Averyanov (Moscow); Anatoli Tsvetnov (Moscow)

GK	1	(Russia) Dmitri Khomich
DF	2	(Burkina Faso) Ibrahim Gnanou	(yellow card) 77'
DF	6	(Moldova) Simeon Bulgaru	(yellow card) 64'
DF	23	(Russia) Anton Grigoryev	(yellow card) 71'
DF	36	(Russia) Dmitri Grachyov	(yellow card) 51'
MF	7	(Russia) Roland Gigolayev	(yellow card) 39'	(substituted off) 71'
MF	18	(Russia) Jambulad Bazayev	(yellow card) 42'	(substituted off) 46'
MF	20	(Ivory Coast) Dacosta Goore	(substituted off) 20'
MF	30	(Russia) Aslan Dudiyev
MF	75	(Uzbekistan) Marat Bikmaev
FW	11	(Brazil) Danilo Neco
Substitutes:
GK	22	(Russia) David Gigolayev
DF	46	(Russia) Albert Tskhovrebov
MF	15	(Russia) Aslan Mashukov
FW	14	(Russia) Atsamaz Burayev	(substituted on) 46'
FW	17	(Russia) Taras Tsarikayev	(substituted on) 20'
FW	19	(Russia) Georgy Gogichayev	(substituted on) 71'
FW	70	(Brazil) Vandinho
Manager:
(Russia) Vladimir Gazzayev

Played in the earlier stages, but were not on the final game squad:

PFC CSKA Moscow: (Nigeria) Chidi Odiah (DF), Georgi Schennikov (DF), (Chile) Mark González (MF), (Brazil) Guilherme (FW).

FC Alania Vladikavkaz: Mikhail Kerzhakov (GK), Nariman Gusalov (DF), (Bulgaria) Ivan Ivanov (DF), Boris Rotenberg (DF), Valeri Tskhovrebov (DF), Pavel Golyshev (MF), Yuri Kirillov (MF), (Romania) Gheorghe Florescu (MF), Arsen Khubulov (MF), Georgy Gabulov (FW), (Moldova) Serghei Dadu (FW), (Nigeria) Baba Collins FW), Aleksandr Marenich (FW), Eldar Nizamutdinov (FW), Aleksandr Tikhonovetsky (FW), (Liberia) Dioh Williams (FW).
