= 2008 Russian Second Division =

Russian Second Division
- Season: 2008

The 2008 Russian Second Division was the third strongest Division in Russian football. The Second Division is geographically divided into 5 zones. The winners of each zone are automatically promoted into the First Division. The bottom finishers of each zone lose professional status and are relegated into the Amateur Football League.

== South ==
Pos	Team	Pld	W	D	L	GF	GA	GD	Pts	Promotion or relegation
1	Volgar-Gazprom-2 Astrakhan (C, P)	34	26	5	3	72	17	+55	83	Promotion to First Division
2	Bataysk-2007	34	24	4	6	73	31	+42	76	
3	Krasnodar (P)	34	22	6	6	60	23	+37	72	Promotion to First Division
4	Olimpia Volgograd	34	22	5	7	71	31	+40	71	
5	Dynamo Stavropol	34	17	8	9	55	47	+8	59	
6	Zhemchuzhina-Sochi	34	14	12	8	48	30	+18	54	
7	Dagdizel Kaspiysk	34	13	7	14	35	45	−10	46	
8	Kavkaztransgaz-2005 Ryzdvyany	34	11	11	12	38	41	−3	44	
9	Energiya Volzhsky	34	12	6	16	44	48	−4	42	
10	Druzhba Maykop	34	12	6	16	39	57	−18	42	
11	Nika Krasny Sulin	34	10	6	18	35	60	−25	36	
12	Taganrog	34	9	9	16	34	42	−8	36	
13	Rotor Volgograd	34	9	8	17	40	62	−22	35	
14	Sudostroitel Astrakhan	34	9	6	19	31	56	−25	33	
15	Krasnodar-2000	34	8	9	17	35	53	−18	33	
16	Sochi-04	34	9	5	20	27	55	−28	32	
17	Spartak-UGP Anapa	34	8	6	20	29	50	−21	30	
18	Avtodor Vladikavkaz	34	7	9	18	39	57	−18	30	

Source: PFL
Rules for classification: 1st points; 2nd matches won; 3rd head-to-head (points, matches won, goal difference, goals scored, away goals scored); 4th goal difference; 5th goals scored; 6th away goals scored
(C) Champions; (P) Promoted
Location of teams

=== Top scorers ===
27 goals

- Mikhail Markosov (FC Dynamo Stavropol)

17 goals

- Dmitry Mezinov (FC Bataysk-2007)
- Vladimir Serov (FC Rotor Volgograd)
- Artur Yelbayev (FC Avtodor Vladikavkaz)

16 goals

- Ivan Gerasimov (FC Olimpia Volgograd)

15 goals

- Dmitri Pinchuk (FC Olimpia Volgograd / FC Zhemchuzhina-Sochi)

14 goals

- Yevgeni Losev (FC Volgar-Gazprom-2 Astrakhan)

12 goals

- Nizar Al-Taravna (FC Bataysk-2007)
- Denis Dorozhkin (FC Krasnodar)
- Dmitri Kovalenko (FC Olimpia Volgograd)

== West ==
Pos	Team	Pld	W	D	L	GF	GA	GD	Pts	Promotion or relegation
1	MVD Rossii Moscow (C, P)	36	25	4	7	70	36	+34	79	Promotion to First Division
2	Torpedo Vladimir	36	24	7	5	54	14	+40	79	
3	Sheksna Cherepovets	36	20	8	8	46	26	+20	68	
4	Spartak Kostroma	36	18	12	6	65	29	+36	66	
5	Volga Tver	36	16	8	12	46	32	+14	56	
6	Sever Murmansk	36	15	11	10	49	45	+4	56	
7	Dynamo St. Petersburg	36	15	8	13	55	45	+10	53	
8	Dmitrov	36	14	7	15	40	42	−2	49	
9	Reutov	36	13	9	14	39	47	−8	48	
10	Pskov-747 Pskov	36	11	14	11	32	33	−1	47	
11	Spartak Shchyolkovo	36	11	13	12	40	40	0	46	
12	Zelenograd	36	12	8	16	47	51	−4	44	
13	Volochanin-Ratmir Vyshny Volochyok	36	10	10	16	32	46	−14	40	
14	Torpedo-RG Moscow	36	10	9	17	41	47	−6	39	
15	Istra	36	10	9	17	37	60	−23	39	
16	Dynamo Vologda	36	10	9	17	42	58	−16	39	
17	Nara-ShBFR Naro-Fominsk	36	10	6	20	36	59	−23	36	
18	Tekstilshchik Ivanovo	36	8	10	18	35	58	−23	34	
19	Zenit-2 St. Petersburg (R)	36	6	6	24	38	76	−38	24	Relegation to Amateur Football League

Source: PFL
Rules for classification: 1st points; 2nd matches won; 3rd head-to-head (points, matches won, goal difference, goals scored, away goals scored); 4th goal difference; 5th goals scored; 6th away goals scored
(C) Champions; (P) Promoted; (R) Relegated
Location of teams. Not shown: Sever (further north)

=== Top scorers ===
18 goals

- Aleksei Baranov (FC Torpedo-RG Moscow / FC MVD Rossii Moscow)

17 goals

- Ramaz Dzhabnidze (FC Dmitrov / FC Zelenograd)

16 goals

- Andrei Opanasyuk (FC Spartak Kostroma)

15 goals

- Yuri Kapusta (FC Nara-ShBFR Naro-Fominsk)
- Vadim Klass (FC Sever Murmansk)

13 goals

- Grigory Gnedov (FC Spartak Kostroma)

12 goals

- Dmitri Vyazmikin (FC Torpedo Vladimir)

10 goals

- Andrei Bubchikov (FC Tekstilshchik Ivanovo)
- Andrei Dyomkin (FC Sheksna Cherepovets / FC MVD Rossii Moscow)
- Kirill Makarov (FC Zenit-2 St. Petersburg)
- Andrei Smirnov (FC Torpedo Vladimir)
- Ivan Stolbovoy (FC Volga Tver)
- Ruslan Usikov (FC Dynamo St. Petersburg / FC MVD Rossii Moscow)
- Aleksei Zhelatin (FC Pskov-747)

== Center ==
Pos	Team	Pld	W	D	L	GF	GA	GD	Pts	Promotion or relegation
1	Metallurg Lipetsk (C, P)	34	23	7	4	58	16	+42	76	Promotion to First Division
2	Avangard Kursk	34	23	6	5	48	18	+30	75	
3	Lukhovitsy	34	20	7	7	52	29	+23	67	
4	Gubkin	34	20	7	7	62	28	+34	67	
5	Zvezda Serpukhov	34	19	8	7	64	32	+32	65	
6	Dynamo-Voronezh	34	17	11	6	53	29	+24	62	
7	Mordovia Saransk	34	16	8	10	46	38	+8	56	
8	Ryazan	34	12	11	11	39	34	+5	47	
9	Yelets	34	15	1	18	44	51	−7	46	
10	Zenit Penza	34	11	10	13	33	44	−11	43	
11	Lokomotiv Liski	34	12	6	16	44	45	−1	42	
12	Spartak Tambov	34	11	5	18	34	46	−12	38	
13	Rusichi Oryol	34	9	11	14	32	41	−9	38	
14	Zodiak Stary Oskol	34	9	5	20	31	50	−19	32	
15	Saturn Moscow Oblast	34	9	4	21	31	51	−20	31	
16	Znamya Truda Orekhovo-Zuyevo	34	6	11	17	30	54	−24	29	
17	Nika Moscow	34	7	2	25	23	77	−54	23	
18	FCS-73 Voronezh (R)	34	4	6	24	25	66	−41	18	Relegation to Amateur Football League

Source: PFL
Rules for classification: 1st points; 2nd matches won; 3rd head-to-head (points, matches won, goal difference, goals scored, away goals scored); 4th goal difference; 5th goals scored; 6th away goals scored
(C) Champions; (P) Promoted; (R) Relegated
Location of teams

=== Top scorers ===
17 goals

- Andrei Meshchaninov (FC Zvezda Serpukhov)

16 goals

- Artur Grigoryan (FC Lokomotiv Liski)

14 goals

- Oleg Shchyotkin (FC Zenit Penza)

13 goals

- Anzour Nafash (FC Lukhovitsy)
- Denis Zhukovskiy (FC Dynamo-Voronezh Voronezh)

11 goals

- Sergei Faustov (FC Gubkin)
- Andrei Meshcheryakov (FC Lokomotiv Liski)

10 goals

- Kirill Kurochkin (FC Mordovia Saransk)
- Sergei Mikhailov (FC Avangard Kursk)
- Anton Sereda (FC Yelets)
- Vasili Shatalov (FC Saturn-2 Moscow Oblast)
- Denis Snimshchikov (FC Mordovia Saransk)

== Ural-Povolzhye ==
Pos	Team	Pld	W	D	L	GF	GA	GD	Pts	Promotion or relegation
1	Volga Nizhny Novgorod (C, P)	34	23	9	2	73	23	+50	78	Promotion to First Division
2	Gazovik Orenburg	34	20	11	3	64	29	+35	71	
3	Nizhny Novgorod (P)	34	22	3	9	78	39	+39	69	Promotion to First Division
4	Gornyak Uchaly	34	17	9	8	65	32	+33	60	
5	Lada-Togliatti	34	15	12	7	44	30	+14	57	
6	Khimik Dzerzhinsk	34	15	12	7	51	39	+12	57	
7	Zenit Chelyabinsk	34	16	7	11	49	31	+18	55	
8	Togliatti	34	16	6	12	63	55	+8	54	
9	Rubin-2 Kazan	34	15	8	11	58	43	+15	53	
10	Tyumen	34	14	8	12	71	57	+14	50	
11	SOYUZ-Gazprom Izhevsk	34	13	6	15	56	57	−1	45	
12	Sokol-Saratov	34	12	5	17	49	44	+5	41	
13	Alnas Almetyevsk	34	11	7	16	51	53	−2	40	
14	Neftekhimik Nizhnekamsk	34	9	11	14	39	44	−5	38	
15	Dynamo Kirov	34	10	7	17	30	41	−11	37	
16	Energetik Uren	34	9	8	17	30	48	−18	35	
17	Yunit Samara	34	2	2	30	21	140	−119	8	
18	Akademiya Dimitrovgrad	34	0	3	31	20	107	−87	3	

Source: PFL
Rules for classification: 1st points; 2nd matches won; 3rd head-to-head (points, matches won, goal difference, goals scored, away goals scored); 4th goal difference; 5th goals scored; 6th away goals scored
(C) Champions; (P) Promoted
Location of teams. Not shown: Tyumen (further east)

=== Top scorers ===
27 goals

- Mikhail Tyufyakov (FC Rubin-2 Kazan / FC Lada Togliatti)

23 goals

- Ilya Borodin (FC Nizhny Novgorod)

17 goals

- Stanislav Prokofyev (FC Volga Nizhny Novgorod)

15 goals

- Marat Shogenov (FC Gazovik Orenburg)

14 goals

- Yevgeni Yaroslavtsev (FC SOYUZ-Gazprom Izhevsk)
- Dmitri Zarva (FC Tyumen)

13 goals

- Artyom Delkin (FC Togliatti)
- Vladimir Morozov (FC Zenit Chelyabinsk)
- Aleksandr Pavlov (FC Tyumen)

12 goals

- Yuri Budylin (FC Alnas Almetyevsk)
- Anatoli Zavyalov (FC Gornyak Uchaly)

== East ==
Pos	Team	Pld	W	D	L	GF	GA	GD	Pts	Promotion or relegation
1	Chita (C, P)	27	17	9	1	53	22	+31	60	Promotion to First Division
2	Smena Komsomolsk-na-Amure	27	17	3	7	51	21	+30	54	
3	Irtysh-1946 Omsk	27	14	7	6	46	30	+16	49	
4	Sibir-2 Novosibirsk	27	11	7	9	36	40	−4	40	
5	Sibiryak Bratsk	27	9	8	10	34	37	−3	35	
6	Metallurg Krasnoyarsk	27	9	7	11	38	34	+4	34	
7	Okean Nakhodka	27	8	10	9	22	28	−6	34	
8	KUZBASS Kemerovo	27	7	4	16	27	49	−22	25	
9	Amur Blagoveshchensk	27	6	7	14	29	45	−16	25	
10	Sakhalin Yuzhno-Sakhalinsk	27	3	6	18	18	48	−30	15	

Source: PFL
Rules for classification: 1st points; 2nd matches won; 3rd head-to-head (points, matches won, goal difference, goals scored, away goals scored); 4th goal difference; 5th goals scored; 6th away goals scored
(C) Champions; (P) Promoted
Location of teams

=== Top scorers ===
14 goals

- Anton Bagayev (FC Irtysh-1946 Omsk)

13 goals

- Stanislav Goncharov (FC Metallurg Krasnoyarsk)

12 goals

- Vyacheslav Chadov (FC Amur Blagoveshchensk)
- Andrei Lodis (FC Smena Komsomolsk-na-Amure)
- Grigori Pogonyshev (FC Sibiryak Bratsk)

9 goals

- Roman Belyayev (FC Sibir-2 Novosibirsk)
- Aleksandr Shtyn (FC KUZBASS Kemerovo)
- Maksim Zhivnovitskiy (FC Chita)

8 goals

- Ilya Levin (FC Smena Komsomolsk-na-Amure)
- Yevgeni Polyakov (FC Sibir-2 Novosibirsk)
- Artyom Rudovskiy (FC Smena Komsomolsk-na-Amure)
