= 2007 Russian First Division =

Russian First Division
- Season: 2007
- Champions: Shinnik Yaroslavl
- Promoted: Shinnik Yaroslavl; Terek Grozny
- Relegated: Avangard Kursk; Mordovia Saransk; Tekstilshchik Ivanovo; Sodovik Sterlitamak; Spartak-MZhK Ryazan
- Top goalscorer: Dmitri Akimov (34)

The 2007 Russian First Division was the 16th edition of Russian First Division. There were 22 teams.

== Teams ==
Location of teams in 2007 Russian First Division

Team	Place
Alania Vladikavkaz	Vladikavkaz
Anzhi Makhachkala	Makhachkala
Avangard Kursk	Kursk
Baltika Kaliningrad	Kaliningrad
Dynamo Bryansk	Bryansk
KAMAZ Naberezhnye Chelny	Naberezhnye Chelny
Mashuk-KMV Pyatigorsk	Pyatigorsk
Metallurg-Kuzbass Novokuznetsk	Novokuznetsk
Mordovia Saransk	Saransk
Nosta Novotroitsk	Novotroitsk
Salyut Belgorod	Belgorod

Team	Place
Shinnik Yaroslavl	Yaroslavl
Sibir Novosibirsk	Novosibirsk
SKA Rostov-on-Don	Rostov-on-Don
SKA-Energiya Khabarovsk	Khabarovsk
Sodovik Sterlitamak	Sterlitamak
Spartak-MZhK Ryazan	Ryazan
Tekstilshchik Ivanovo	Ivanovo
Terek Grozny	Grozny
Torpedo Moscow	Moscow
Ural Sverdlovsk Oblast	Yekaterinburg
Zvezda Irkutsk	Irkutsk

== League table ==
Pos	Team	Pld	W	D	L	GF	GA	GD	Pts	Promotion or relegation
1	Shinnik Yaroslavl (C, P)	42	28	8	6	68	30	+38	92	Promotion to Premier League
2	Terek Grozny (P)	42	28	6	8	69	27	+42	90	Promotion to Premier League
3	Sibir Novosibirsk	42	25	11	6	80	39	+41	86	
4	KAMAZ	42	23	8	11	67	34	+33	77	
5	Ural Sverdlovsk Oblast	42	21	14	7	70	33	+37	77	
6	Torpedo Moscow	42	21	6	15	75	59	+16	69	
7	Nosta Novotroitsk	42	16	16	10	63	40	+23	64	
8	Dynamo Bryansk	42	16	11	15	49	52	−3	59	
9	Salyut Belgorod	42	17	6	19	44	45	−1	57	
10	Anzhi Makhachkala	42	16	9	17	41	44	−3	57	
11	Zvezda Irkutsk	42	16	8	18	60	47	+13	56	
12	Alania Vladikavkaz	42	15	11	16	56	56	0	56	
13	SKA-Khabarovsk	42	14	14	14	50	48	+2	56	
14	Mashuk-KMV	42	14	13	15	53	55	−2	55	
15	Baltika Kaliningrad	42	14	12	16	53	49	+4	54	
16	Metallurg-Kuzbass	42	15	8	19	53	70	−17	53	
17	SKA Rostov-on-Don	42	14	11	17	50	60	−10	53	
18	Avangard Kursk (R)	42	15	6	21	50	55	−5	51	Relegation to Second Division
19	Mordovia Saransk (R)	42	13	4	25	44	88	−44	43	Relegation to Second Division
20	Tekstilshchik Ivanovo (R)	42	10	8	24	38	68	−30	38	Relegation to Second Division
21	Sodovik Sterlitamak (R)	42	8	10	24	32	65	−33	34	Relegation to Second Division
22	Spartak-MZhK Ryazan (R)	42	1	4	37	21	101	−80	7	Relegation to Second Division

Source: PFL, RSSSF
Rules for classification: 1) points; 2) goal difference; 3) number of goals scored.
(C) Champions; (P) Promoted; (R) Relegated

== Results ==
Home \ Away	ALA	ANZ	AVA	BAL	DBR	KAM	KMV	MTK	MOR	NOS	SAL	SHI	SIB	SKA	SKR	SOD	MZH	TEK	TER	TOR	URA	ZVE
Alania Vladikavkaz		0–0	2–1	0–1	3–2	2–1	3–0	4–3	0–0	1–1	1–0	0–1	2–0	0–0	3–2	5–1	3–0	7–0	0–0	1–1	0–1	0–2
Anzhi Makhachkala	0–0		1–0	1–0	1–0	1–2	1–1	1–3	1–0	2–2	2–1	1–0	0–0	2–0	1–3	2–0	5–0	1–0	1–3	3–2	2–1	1–1
Avangard Kursk	0–2	1–0		2–1	1–0	1–0	1–2	1–1	2–1	0–0	0–1	2–2	0–1	0–1	0–1	2–1	1–0	2–0	0–1	2–1	1–0	5–2
Baltika Kaliningrad	1–1	1–2	3–2		1–2	0–0	2–2	0–1	2–0	1–0	3–0	1–2	1–3	2–1	3–0	3–0	3–0	2–3	0–1	2–0	0–0	2–2
Dynamo Bryansk	0–1	2–0	1–1	1–1		0–1	0–0	3–1	0–0	0–2	1–0	2–0	0–0	2–1	2–1	2–2	1–0	1–2	2–2	2–0	3–1	2–2
KAMAZ	5–0	0–0	3–1	0–0	5–2		4–0	1–0	3–0	0–1	3–0	0–0	0–2	2–1	3–0	0–0	5–2	2–0	2–1	4–0	2–1	3–2
Mashuk-KMV	1–0	0–2	0–1	1–1	1–3	1–2		0–0	5–2	3–1	2–0	2–1	2–3	3–3	3–0	1–0	3–0	3–0	0–2	0–2	0–0	0–0
Metallurg-Kuzbass	1–1	3–0	4–3	0–0	0–1	1–0	0–1		0–1	3–2	1–0	3–1	3–5	3–2	2–1	1–2	3–0	1–0	0–3	0–1	0–1	2–1
Mordovia Saransk	3–1	0–2	3–1	1–2	2–0	2–0	2–1	1–2		0–3	2–1	1–3	2–6	1–0	1–0	2–0	2–0	2–1	0–4	2–2	0–1	1–4
Nosta Novotroitsk	4–0	3–0	0–0	2–0	1–1	0–0	2–2	2–0	3–0		1–0	0–1	0–5	1–1	6–0	1–0	3–0	0–0	2–0	0–0	1–1	3–0
Salyut Belgorod	4–1	1–0	1–0	1–0	0–0	0–0	2–1	1–1	2–1	1–1		3–1	1–2	2–0	1–0	2–1	3–0	1–0	0–1	4–1	2–0	2–1
Shinnik Yaroslavl	3–2	2–0	1–0	2–0	4–0	2–1	1–0	5–0	2–0	1–0	2–0		3–1	3–2	1–0	2–0	2–0	3–0	1–1	2–0	1–0	0–2
Sibir Novosibirsk	2–1	1–0	3–0	0–1	2–1	1–0	1–1	1–1	6–2	2–2	1–1	3–3		1–0	0–0	3–2	3–0	5–0	1–0	5–3	0–1	2–0
SKA-Khabarovsk	2–2	1–0	2–1	2–1	1–1	1–1	2–1	2–0	3–0	0–3	2–0	0–0	1–1		1–0	3–0	1–1	0–0	2–1	4–0	2–3	1–0
SKA Rostov-on-Don	2–0	1–1	3–2	3–3	2–1	1–2	1–2	4–1	4–3	2–1	0–0	2–2	0–1	0–0		1–1	3–0	1–0	0–0	0–0	2–1	2–1
Sodovik Sterlitamak	1–0	0–0	0–0	1–3	0–2	0–2	1–2	2–3	3–0	1–2	1–0	0–0	0–2	2–0	1–2		3–0	0–0	0–2	0–0	1–1	1–2
Spartak-MZhK Ryazan	1–3	0–3	0–3	1–2	0–3	0–3	2–2	2–2	0–3	2–2	2–4	0–3	1–3	0–3	2–4	0–1		0–3	0–3	1–4	1–6	0–3
Tekstilshchik Ivanovo	4–1	1–0	1–4	3–2	0–2	0–1	0–0	1–1	0–0	3–2	3–2	0–1	0–1	2–2	0–0	1–2	2–3		0–1	0–2	1–2	3–1
Terek Grozny	0–2	2–0	4–2	2–0	2–0	2–1	2–1	3–1	2–0	3–0	1–0	0–1	2–0	0–0	3–0	4–0	3–0	1–0		2–0	1–1	1–0
Torpedo Moscow	3–1	2–1	3–2	3–1	3–0	3–1	4–0	4–0	4–0	2–1	2–0	1–2	1–1	2–0	3–1	1–0	3–0	5–3	1–2		2–4	1–2
Ural Sverdlovsk Oblast	0–0	3–0	2–1	0–0	5–0	2–0	1–1	3–0	8–1	2–2	2–0	0–0	0–0	0–0	1–0	1–1	3–0	1–0	4–1	3–2		1–0
Zvezda Irkutsk	2–0	1–0	0–1	1–1	0–1	1–2	0–2	3–1	4–0	0–0	1–0	0–1	1–0	4–0	1–1	5–0	4–0	0–1	2–0	0–1	2–2	

Source: PFL (in Russian)
Legend: Blue = home team win; Yellow = draw; Red = away team win.

== Top goalscorers ==
Rank	Player	Team	Goals
1	(Russia) Dmitri Akimov	Sibir	34
2	(Russia) Mikhail Mysin	Ural	21
3	(Ukraine) Roman Monaryov	Shinnik	20
4	(Russia) Stanislav Dubrovin	Alania	19
5	(Russia) Anton Kobyalko	Metallurg-Kuzbass	18
6	(Russia) Eldar Nizamutdinov	Nosta	16
7	(Belarus) Maksim Romaschenko	Torpedo (M)	15
8	(Russia) Vladimir Levshin	Zvezda (I)	13
9	(Russia) Vitali Burmakov	Sodovik	12
9	(Bosnia and Herzegovina) Zajko Zeba	KAMAZ	12

== See also ==
- 2007 Russian Premier League
- 2007 Russian Second Division
