= Meshcheryakov =

Meshcheryakov or Mescheryakov feminine: Meshcheryakova or Mescheryakova (Russian: Мещеряков) is a Russian patronymic surname literally meaning "son of meshcheryak. It may refer to:

- Anastasiya Meshcheryakova, murdered 4-year old Russian girl
- Andrei Meshcheryakov (footballer) (born 1984), Russian football player
- Andrei Meshcheryakov (swimmer) (born 1994), Russian swimmer
- Andrei Meshcheryakov (serial killer) (born 1978), Russian robber and serial killer
- Mikhail Meshcheryakov
- Natalya Meshcheryakova (born 1972), Russian swimmer
- Nikolai Meshcheryakov
- Roman Meshcheryakov
- Vladimir Meshcheryakov, Soviet politician and statesman
- Yuriy Meshcheryakov (1946–2001), Soviet, Russian and Ukrainian animator
