= Leonid Kiyenko =

Russian footballer and manager

Personal information
- Full name: Leonid Vladimirovich Kiyenko
- Date of birth: 10 June 1974 (age 52)
- Height: 1.83 m (6 ft 0 in)
- Position: Midfielder

Youth career
- DYuSSh Nakhodka

Senior career*
Years	Team	Apps	(Gls)
1991–1995	FC Okean Nakhodka	34	(4)
1993	→ FC Okean-d Nakhodka (loan)	23	(8)
1995	FC SKA Khabarovsk	1	(0)
1996–1998	FC Okean Nakhodka	61	(5)
1999	FC Lokomotiv Ussuriysk (amateur)		
2000	FC Zvezda Irkutsk	14	(2)
2000	FC Lokomotiv Ussuriysk (amateur)		
2001	FC Luch Vladivostok	17	(0)
2001	FC Lokomotiv Ussuriysk (amateur)		
2002	FC Sibiryak Bratsk	15	(0)
2002–2003	FC Portovik-Energiya Kholmsk (amateur)		
2008	FC Birobidzhan		

Managerial career
- 2009: FC Okean-d Nakhodka
- 2011–2012: FC Sakhalin Yuzhno-Sakhalinsk (assistant)
- 2012: FC Okean Nakhodka (assistant)
- 2012–2015: FC Okean Nakhodka
- * Club domestic league appearances and goals

Leonid Vladimirovich Kiyenko (Russian: Леонид Владимирович Киенко; born 10 June 1974) is a Russian football manager and a former player.
