= Andrei Meshcheryakov =

Andrei Meshcheryakov may refer to:

- Andrei Meshcheryakov (footballer) (born 1984), Russian football player
- Andrei Meshcheryakov (swimmer) (born 1994), Russian swimmer
- Andrei Meshcheryakov (serial killer) (born 1978), Russian robber and serial killer
