= Levshin =

Levshin (masculine, Russian: Левшин) or Levshina (feminine, Russian: Левшина) is a Russian surname. Notable people with the surname include:

- Alina Levshin (born 1984), German–Ukrainian actress
- Platon Levshin (1737–1812), Russian theologian
- Vladimir Levshin (born 1983), Russian soccer player
