= Vladimir Malakhov =

Vladimir Malakhov is the name of:

- Vladimir Malakhov (ice hockey) (born 1968), ice hockey player
- Vladimir Malakhov (dancer) (born 1968), ballet dancer
- Vladimir Malakhov (chess player) (born 1980), chess player and physicist
- Vladimir Malakhov (footballer) (born 1955), football (soccer) player
