= Azamat Kurachinov =

Russian footballer

Personal information
- Full name: Azamat Khasanovich Kurachinov
- Date of birth: 22 December 1989 (age 36)
- Height: 1.81 m (5 ft 11 in)
- Position: Forward

Youth career
- Pobeda Ust-Dzheguta
- UOR Volgograd

Senior career*
Years	Team	Apps	(Gls)
2007–2008	Dynamo Stavropol	42	(3)
2009	Stavropol	25	(16)
2010	Amkar Perm	0	(0)
2011–2012	Sheksna Cherepovets	43	(18)
2012–2013	Salyut Belgorod	17	(0)
2013–2014	Angusht Nazran	10	(0)
2014	Dynamo GTS Stavropol	5	(0)
2015	TSK Simferopol		
2016	Dynamo Stavropol	23	(3)
2017	Metallurg-OEMK Stary Oskol		
2018–2021	Dynamo Stavropol	69	(29)
2022	Druzhba Maykop	11	(1)
2023–2024	Nart Cherkessk (amateur)		
2024	Nart Cherkessk	27	(4)
- * Club domestic league appearances and goals as of 16 November 2024

Azamat Khasanovich Kurachinov (Russian: Азамат Хасанович Курачинов; born 22 December 1989) is a Russian professional football player.

== Club career ==
He made his Russian Football National League debut for Salyut Belgorod on 30 July 2012 in a game against Ufa.
