= Vladimir Chechulin =

Russian footballer

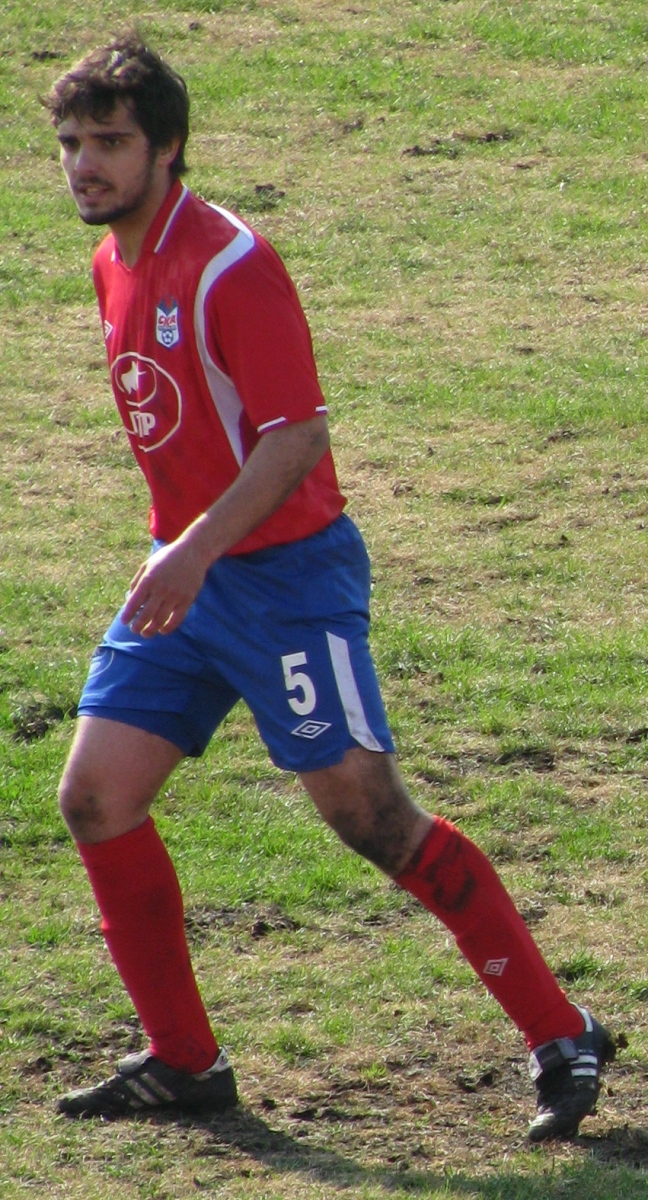

Personal information
- Full name: Vladimir Aleksandrovich Chechulin
- Date of birth: 18 June 1988 (age 38)
- Place of birth: Sochi, Krasnodar Krai, Russian SFSR
- Height: 1.75 m (5 ft 9 in)
- Position: Midfielder

Senior career*
Years	Team	Apps	(Gls)
2007–2009	FC SKA Rostov-on-Don	60	(0)
2010	FC Bataysk-2007	6	(0)
2010–2012	FC SKA Rostov-on-Don	38	(1)
2012–2015	FC Taganrog	83	(1)
2015	FC Okean Kerch	12	(0)
2016	FC MITOS Novocherkassk	10	(0)
2017	FC Mashuk-KMV Pyatigorsk	7	(0)
- * Club domestic league appearances and goals

Vladimir Aleksandrovich Chechulin (Russian: Владимир Александрович Чечулин; born 18 June 1988) is a former Russian professional football player.

== Club career ==
He played two seasons in the Russian Football National League for FC SKA Rostov-on-Don.
