= Kirill Biryukov =

Russian football midfielder

Personal information
- Full name: Kirill Igorevich Biryukov
- Date of birth: 30 October 1992 (age 34)
- Place of birth: Tashkent, Uzbekistan
- Height: 1.87 m (6 ft 2 in)
- Position: Midfielder

Youth career
- FC Khimki

Senior career*
Years	Team	Apps	(Gls)
2010–2011	FC Khimki	0	(0)
2012–2013	FC Istra	8	(1)
2013–2014	FC Dolgoprudny	22	(5)
2014–2015	FC Domodedovo Moscow	13	(1)
2015	FSK Dolgoprudny	9	(1)
2017	FC Veles Moscow	4	(0)
2018	FC SKA-Khabarovsk	3	(0)
- * Club domestic league appearances and goals

Kirill Igorevich Biryukov (Russian: Кирилл Игоревич Бирюков; born 30 October 1992) is a Russian former football midfielder.

== Club career ==
He made his debut in the Russian Second Division for FC Istra on 22 April 2012 in a game against FC Znamya Truda Orekhovo-Zuyevo.

He made his Russian Football National League debut for FC SKA-Khabarovsk on 17 July 2018 in a game against FC Armavir.
