= Aleksei Kandalintsev =

Russian footballer and official

Aleksei Kandalintsev Алексей Кандалинцев
Personal information
- Full name: Aleksei Sergeyevich Kandalintsev
- Date of birth: 6 February 1976 (age 50)
- Place of birth: Khabarovsk, Russian SFSR
- Height: 1.88 m (6 ft 2 in)
- Position: Midfielder

Team information
- Current team: FC SKA-Khabarovsk (general director)

Senior career*
Years	Team	Apps	(Gls)
1992–1999	FC SKA Khabarovsk	211	(29)
2000–2003	FC Tom Tomsk	113	(10)
2004	FC SKA-Energiya Khabarovsk	17	(0)
2005	FC Smena Komsomolsk-na-Amure	30	(5)
2006	FC SKA-Energiya Khabarovsk	15	(2)
2009	FC Mostovik-Primorye Ussuriysk (D4)		
2010	FC Mostovik-Primorye Ussuriysk	4	(0)

Managerial career
- 2015–2017: FC SKA-Energiya Khabarovsk (director)
- 2017–: FC SKA-Khabarovsk (general director)
- * Club domestic league appearances and goals

Aleksei Sergeyevich Kandalintsev (Russian: Алексей Серге́евич Кандалинцев; born 6 February 1976) is a Russian professional football official and a former player. He is the general director for FC SKA-Khabarovsk.

== Club career ==
He played 8 seasons in the Russian Football National League for FC SKA Khabarovsk and FC Tom Tomsk.
