= Maksim Bondarenko =

Russian footballer (1981–2025)

Personal information
- Full name: Maksim Viktorovich Bondarenko
- Date of birth: 16 June 1981
- Place of birth: Volgograd, Russian SFSR, USSR
- Date of death: 2 October 2025 (aged 44)
- Height: 1.82 m (6 ft 0 in)
- Positions: Striker; midfielder

Youth career
- Rotor Volgograd

Senior career*
Years	Team	Apps	(Gls)
1998–2000	Rotor-2 Volgograd	78	(44)
1999–2004	Rotor Volgograd	57	(10)
2005	Fakel Voronezh	26	(3)
2006	FC Oryol	23	(5)
2006	Sodovik Sterlitamak	13	(5)
2007	Baltika Kaliningrad	20	(5)
2008	FC Olimpia Volgograd	4	(1)
2010	FC Sakhalin Yuzhno-Sakhalinsk	22	(11)
2011	FC Mostovik-Primorye Ussuriysk	16	(6)
2012	FC Sakhalin Yuzhno-Sakhalinsk	12	(2)
- * Club domestic league appearances and goals

Maksim Viktorovich Bondarenko (Russian: Максим Викторович Бондаренко; 16 June 1981 – 2 October 2025) was a Russian professional footballer who played as a striker and midfielder.

== Career ==
Bondarenko made his professional debut in the Russian Second Division in 1998 for Rotor Volgograd.

== Death ==
Bondarenko died on 2 October 2025, at the age of 44.

== Honours ==
Individual

- Russian Cup top goalscorer (joint): 2010–11
