= Tsallagov =

Tsallagov (Russian: Цаллагов) is a Russian surname. Notable people with the surname include:

- Ibragim Tsallagov (born 1990), Russian footballer
- Marat Tsallagov (born 1982), Russian footballer
