= Usanov =

Usanov is a surname. Notable people with the surname include:

- Aleksei Usanov (born 2001), Russian footballer
- Maxim Usanov (born 1985), Russian footballer
- Rustem Usanov (born 1985), Kyrgyzstan footballer
