= Yevgeni Yaroslavtsev =

Russian footballer

Personal information
- Full name: Yevgeni Aleksandrovich Yaroslavtsev
- Date of birth: 31 January 1982 (age 44)
- Place of birth: Chelyabinsk, Russian SFSR
- Height: 1.80 m (5 ft 11 in)
- Position: Forward

Senior career*
Years	Team	Apps	(Gls)
2000–2005	Zenit Chelyabinsk	162	(30)
2006	Torpedo Zhodino	8	(1)
2006	Ryazan-Agrokomplekt	9	(0)
2007–2008	SOYUZ-Gazprom Izhevsk	50	(20)
2009	Metallurg-Kuzbass Novokuznetsk	25	(14)
2010	Sokol Saratov	11	(2)
2010	Sheksna Cherepovets	13	(2)
2011–2013	Zenit-Izhevsk	51	(10)
- * Club domestic league appearances and goals

Yevgeni Aleksandrovich Yaroslavtsev (Russian: Евгений Александрович Ярославцев; born 31 January 1982) is a former Russian former professional footballer.
