= Stanislav Murygin =

Russian footballer

Personal information
- Full name: Stanislav Yuryevich Murygin
- Date of birth: 7 January 1984 (age 42)
- Place of birth: Moscow, Russian SFSR
- Height: 1.78 m (5 ft 10 in)
- Position: Forward

Team information
- Current team: FC Istra

Youth career
- SDYuSShOR-94 Krylatskoye Moscow
- FC Dynamo Moscow

Senior career*
Years	Team	Apps	(Gls)
2000	FC Dynamo-2 Moscow	12	(2)
2001–2005	FC Dynamo Moscow	12	(1)
2006	FC Khimki	14	(2)
2006	FC Fakel Voronezh	12	(0)
2007	FC Spartak-MZhK Ryazan	10	(0)
2007	FC Torpedo Moscow	16	(4)
2008	FC Dynamo St. Petersburg	10	(0)
2008–2009	FC Istra	44	(21)
2010	FC Vityaz Podolsk	27	(4)
2011–2012	FC Istra	33	(6)

International career
2004	Russia U-21	3	(0)
- * Club domestic league appearances and goals

Stanislav Yuryevich Murygin (Russian: Станислав Юрьевич Мурыгин; born 7 January 1984) is a Russian former footballer.
