= Andrei Bagayev =

Russian footballer

Personal information
- Full name: Andrei Vyacheslavovich Bagayev
- Date of birth: 7 June 1978 (age 48)
- Place of birth: Omsk, Russian SFSR
- Height: 1.74 m (5 ft 8 1/2 in)
- Position: Midfielder

Senior career*
Years	Team	Apps	(Gls)
1995–1997	FC Irtysh Omsk	1	(0)
1999–2000	FC Irtysh Omsk	45	(5)
2001–2002	FC Chkalovets-Olimpik Novosibirsk	35	(2)
2002	FC Chkalovets-1936 Novosibirsk	10	(0)
2003–2010	FC Irtysh Omsk	197	(10)
2011–2012	FC Sibiryak Bratsk	48	(1)
- * Club domestic league appearances and goals

Andrei Vyacheslavovich Bagayev (Russian: Андрей Вячеславович Багаев; born 7 June 1978) is a former Russian professional football player.

== Club career ==
He played in the Russian Football National League for FC Irtysh Omsk in 2010.

== Personal life ==
He is the older brother of Anton Bagayev.
