= Vladimir Svizhuk =

Russian footballer

Personal information
- Full name: Vladimir Igorevich Svizhuk
- Date of birth: 12 September 1983 (age 43)
- Place of birth: Moscow, Soviet Union
- Height: 1.84 m (6 ft 1/2 in)
- Position: Forward

Youth career
- 2000: MEPhI Moscow

Senior career*
Years	Team	Apps	(Gls)
2001–2003	Titan Moscow	78	(24)
2004–2006	SKA-Energiya Khabarovsk	85	(9)
2007	Vitebsk	25	(3)
2008	Astana	11	(0)
2008	Torpedo-RG Moscow	17	(5)
2009–2010	Istra	50	(17)
2010–2011	Lokomotiv-2 Moscow	50	(5)
2012–2013	Podolye Podolsky District	39	(8)
2013–2014	Dolgoprudny	50	(8)
2015–2016	Olimpik Mytishchi		
- * Club domestic league appearances and goals

Vladimir Igorevich Svizhuk (Russian: Владимир Игоревич Свижук; born 12 September 1983) is a former Russian professional footballer.

== Club career ==
He played 3 seasons in the Russian Football National League for FC SKA-Energiya Khabarovsk.
