= Aleksandr Krendelev =

Russian footballer

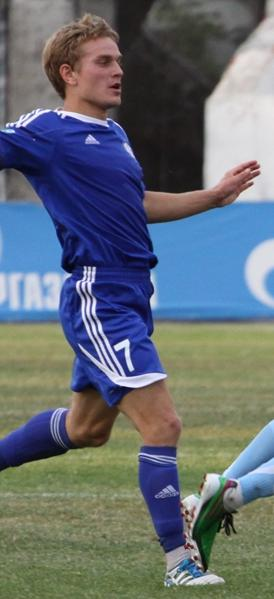

Personal information
- Full name: Aleksandr Romanovich Krendelev
- Date of birth: 29 January 1986 (age 40)
- Place of birth: Ivanovo Oblast, Russian SFSR
- Height: 1.80 m (5 ft 11 in)
- Position: Midfielder

Team information
- Current team: FC Chelyabinsk (assistant coach)

Senior career*
Years	Team	Apps	(Gls)
2004–2008	FC Sheksna Cherepovets	123	(13)
2009–2011	FC KAMAZ Naberezhnye Chelny	88	(4)
2012–2013	FC Gazovik Orenburg	31	(1)
2013–2016	FC Volgar Astrakhan	94	(11)
2016–2018	FC Mordovia Saransk	49	(8)
2018	FC Tekstilshchik Ivanovo	5	(0)
2019	FC Neftekhimik Nizhnekamsk	4	(0)
2019–2020	FC Mashuk-KMV Pyatigorsk	23	(1)

Managerial career
- 2023–: FC Chelyabinsk (assistant)
- * Club domestic league appearances and goals

Aleksandr Romanovich Krendelev (Russian: Александр Романович Кренделев; born 29 January 1986) is a Russian professional football coach and a former player. He is an assistant manager with FC Chelyabinsk.

== Club career ==
He made his professional debut in the Russian Second Division in 2004 for FC Severstal Cherepovets. He made his Russian Football National League debut for FC KAMAZ Naberezhnye Chelny on 28 March 2009 in a game against FC Metallurg Lipetsk.
