= Ivan Karatygin =

Russian footballer

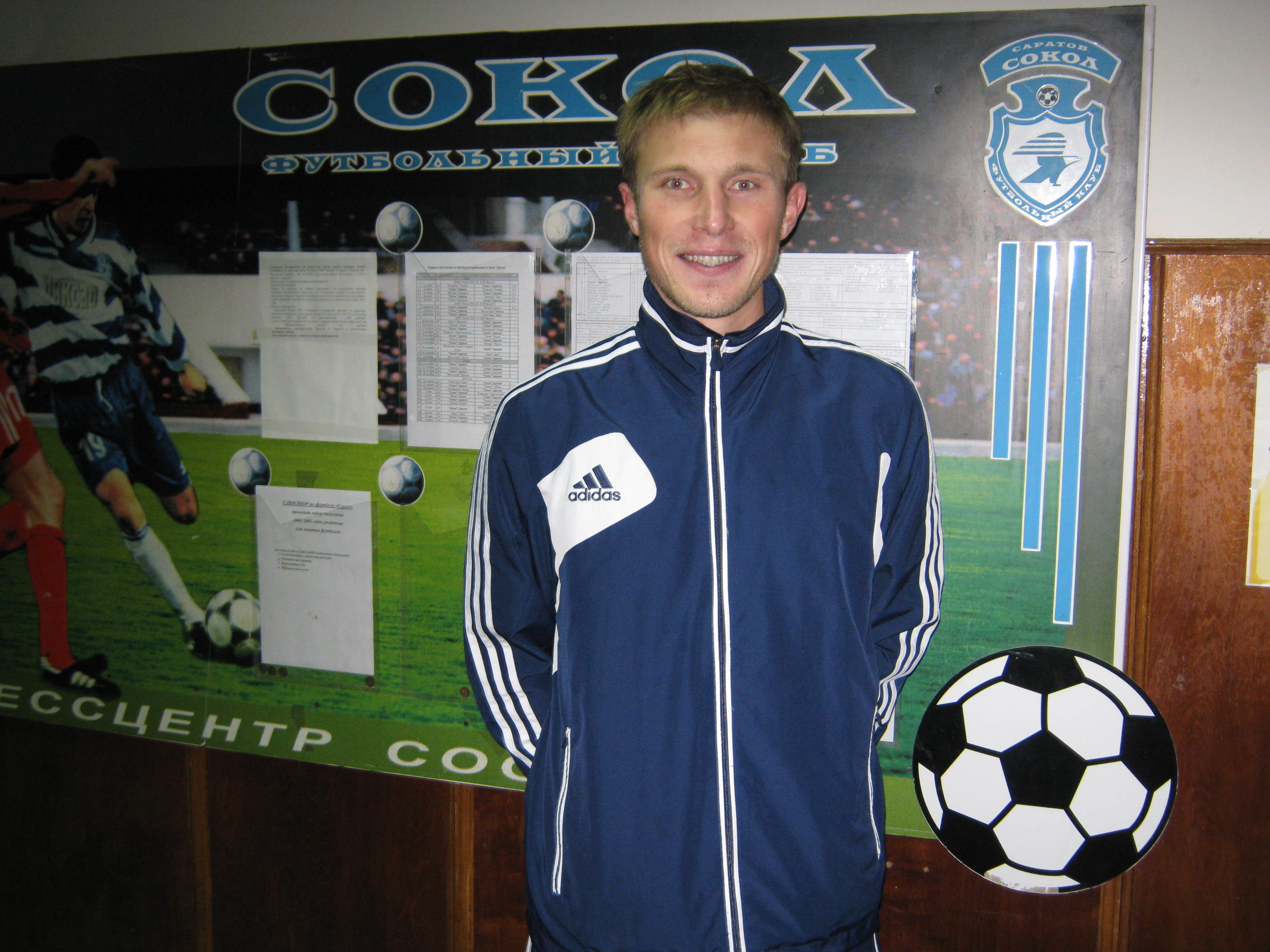

Personal information
- Full name: Ivan Aleksandrovich Karatygin
- Date of birth: 17 January 1982 (age 44)
- Place of birth: Vladimir, Russian SFSR
- Height: 1.86 m (6 ft 1 in)
- Positions: Defender; midfielder

Team information
- Current team: FC Torpedo Vladimir (director)

Senior career*
Years	Team	Apps	(Gls)
1999	FC Torpedo Vladimir	6	(0)
2000	FC Torpedo Vladimir (amateur)		
2001–2012	FC Torpedo Vladimir	308	(36)
2012–2013	FC Sokol Saratov	23	(1)
2013–2018	FC Torpedo Vladimir	137	(18)

Managerial career
- 2021–2022: FC Torpedo Vladimir (deputy director)
- 2024–: FC Torpedo Vladimir (director)
- * Club domestic league appearances and goals

Ivan Aleksandrovich Karatygin (Russian: Иван Александрович Каратыгин; born 17 January 1982) is a Russian professional football official and a former player who is the director of FC Torpedo Vladimir.

== Honours ==
- Russian Second Division, Zone West best defender: 2010.

== Club career ==
He played in the Russian Football National League for FC Torpedo Vladimir in the 2011–12 season.
