= Anatoli Zavyalov =

Russian footballer

Personal information
- Full name: Anatoli Vladimirovich Zavyalov
- Date of birth: 21 October 1979 (age 47)
- Place of birth: Neftekamsk, Russian SFSR
- Height: 1.74 m (5 ft 9 in)
- Position: Midfielder

Senior career*
Years	Team	Apps	(Gls)
1997	FC Zenit Izhevsk	20	(1)
1999	FC Dynamo Izhevsk	11	(3)
2000–2004	FC Gazovik-Gazprom Izhevsk	134	(7)
2005	FC Neftyanik Ufa	34	(9)
2006	FC SOYUZ-Gazprom Izhevsk	12	(2)
2007	FC Metallurg Krasnoyarsk	30	(1)
2008–2009	FC Gornyak Uchaly	57	(18)
2010	FC Bashinformsvyaz-Dynamo Ufa	17	(2)
2011	FC Ufa	0	(0)
2011–2013	FC Zenit-Izhevsk	8	(1)
- * Club domestic league appearances and goals

Anatoli Vladimirovich Zavyalov (Russian: Анатолий Владимирович Завьялов; born 21 October 1979) is a former Russian professional football player.

== Club career ==
He made his Russian Football National League debut for FC Gazovik-Gazprom Izhevsk on 9 April 2000 in a game against FC Kristall Smolensk.
