= Vladimir Tumayev =

Russian footballer (born 1946)

Personal information
- Full name: Vladimir Alekseyevich Tumayev
- Date of birth: 10 December 1946 (age 79)
- Place of birth: Marks, Russian SFSR
- Height: 1.79 m (5 ft 10 in)
- Position: Forward

Senior career*
Years	Team	Apps	(Gls)
1989–1991	FC Gazovik Izhevsk	19	(0)
1992–2005	FC Gazovik-Gazprom Izhevsk	114	(9)
- * Club domestic league appearances and goals

Vladimir Alekseyevich Tumayev (Russian: Владимир Алексеевич Тумаев; born 10 December 1946) is a Russian businessman, football official and a former player. He last served as the president of FC SOYUZ-Gazprom Izhevsk, formerly known as FC Gazovik-Gazprom Izhevsk, the post he held since the 1990s until 2010.

== Career ==
Tumayev played made his professional debut with his club FC Gazovik-Gazprom Izhevsk at 45 years of age. He went on to play well into his fifties, while his team was playing on the second-highest level of football in Russia, the Russian Football National League. He would usually come in as a substitute close to the end of the game which was already decided. He played his last professional game so far in the Russian Second Division on 29 October 2005 against FC Neftekhimik Nizhnekamsk on the last day of the season, scoring a goal in a 3–2 victory (his penalty kick was saved by Neftekhimik goalkeeper, but he scored on a rebound). He was 58 years, 10 months and 19 days old on that day, making him the oldest professional soccer player ever in Russia and, possibly, Europe. In January 2009, he composed a song about Gazprom, which was reviewed as 'extremely kitsch' by France 24.

== Controversies ==
On 20 February 2018, Tumayev was charged with organizing an attempt to murder his business partner Vadim Styazhkin, committed by a group of persons by prior agreement, and on 22 February, he was placed under house arrest by the decision of the industrial district court of Izhevsk. But on 6 March, at the request of the Prosecutor, the Supreme court of Udmurtia decided to detain him. On 16 April, the term of imprisonment was extended until 12 June. His trial started on 10 September 2019. His charge was reduced from organizing a murder attempt to "organizing an intentional infliction of grievous bodily harm".
