= Andrei Bubchikov =

Russian footballer

Personal information
- Full name: Andrei Valeryevich Bubchikov
- Date of birth: 24 September 1979 (age 47)
- Place of birth: Ivanovo, Soviet Union
- Height: 1.81 m (5 ft 11 1/2 in)
- Position: Midfielder

Senior career*
| Years | Team | Apps | (Gls) |
| 1996 | Spartak-Telekom Shuya | 9 | (0) |
| 1997–2000 | Tekstilshchik Ivanovo | 52 | (7) |
| 2000–2003 | Spartak-Telekom Shuya | 114 | (21) |
| 2004 | Tekstilshchik-Telekom Ivanovo | 21 | (1) |
| 2005 | Avangard Kursk | 10 | (1) |
| 2005 | Energetik Uren | 17 | (6) |
| 2006 | Torpedo Zhodino | 0 | (0) |
| 2006 | Oryol | 18 | (0) |
| 2007 | Zvezda Serpukhov | 26 | (5) |
| 2008 | Tekstilshchik Ivanovo | 34 | (10) |
| 2009 | Sheksna Cherepovets | 13 | (6) |
| 2010 | Tekstilshchik Ivanovo | 20 | (2) |
- * Club domestic league appearances and goals

Andrei Valeryevich Bubchikov (Russian: Андрей Валерьевич Бубчиков; born 24 September 1979) is a former Russian professional football player.

== Club career ==
He played two seasons in the Russian Football National League for FC Avangard Kursk and FC Oryol.
