= Aslan Zaseev =

Russian footballer

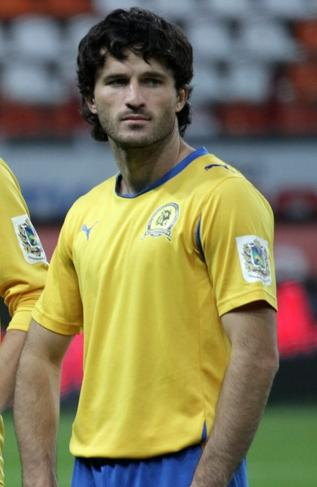
- Zaseev with Luch-Energiya in 2011

Personal information
- Full name: Aslan Taimurazovich Zaseev
- Date of birth: 7 March 1982 (age 44)
- Height: 1.77 m (5 ft 10 in)
- Position: Defender

Team information
- Current team: FC Torpedo Vladimir (manager)

Senior career*
Years	Team	Apps	(Gls)
2000–2003	FC Lada Togliatti	82	(1)
2004	FC Chernomorets Novorossiysk	38	(1)
2005–2009	FC Kuban Krasnodar	127	(1)
2010	FC Volga Nizhny Novgorod	24	(0)
2011	FC Chernomorets Novorossiysk	14	(0)
2011–2012	FC Luch-Energiya Vladivostok	22	(0)
2012–2013	PFC Spartak Nalchik	49	(0)
2014	FC Neftekhimik Nizhnekamsk	8	(1)
2014	FC Tambov	19	(0)

Managerial career
- 2022–2023: FC Krasnodar (U19)
- 2023: FC Krasnodar (U19 assistant)
- 2024: FC Alania-2 Vladikavkaz
- 2025–: FC Torpedo Vladimir
- * Club domestic league appearances and goals

Aslan Taimurazovich Zaseev (Russian: Аслан Таймуразович Засеев; born 7 March 1982) is a Russian football coach and a former player who is the manager of FC Torpedo Vladimir.

== Club career ==
He made his debut in the Russian Premier League in 2007 with FC Kuban Krasnodar.
