= Valeri Ganus =

Russian footballer

Personal information
- Full name: Valeri Vadimovich Ganus
- Date of birth: 25 November 1998 (age 27)
- Place of birth: Krasnoyarsk, Russia
- Height: 1.93 m (6 ft 4 in)
- Position: Defender

Team information
- Current team: Cherepovets
- Number: 3

Youth career
- 2016–2017: Yenisey Krasnoyarsk

Senior career*
Years	Team	Apps	(Gls)
2017–2021	Yenisey Krasnoyarsk	9	(0)
2021	Yenisey-2 Krasnoyarsk	12	(1)
2022	KAMAZ	4	(0)
2022	Chayka Peschanokopskoye	3	(0)
2023	Saturn Ramenskoye	8	(0)
2023	Spartak Tambov	15	(2)
2024–2025	Sevastopol	53	(1)
2026–	Cherepovets	26	(0)
- * Club domestic league appearances and goals as of 1 November 2026

Valeri Vadimovich Ganus (Russian: Валерий Вадимович Ганус; born 25 November 1998) is a Russian football player who plays for Cherepovets.

== Club career ==
He made his debut in the Russian Football National League for Yenisey Krasnoyarsk on 20 July 2019 in a game against Rotor Volgograd.
