= Stepan Komar =

Russian footballer

Personal information
- Full name: Stepan Vladimirovich Komar
- Date of birth: 17 March 2003 (age 23)
- Place of birth: Krasnodar, Russia
- Height: 1.81 m (5 ft 11 in)
- Position: Defender

Team information
- Current team: Torpedo Vladimir
- Number: 91

Youth career
- –2019: Krasnodar

Senior career*
Years	Team	Apps	(Gls)
2019–2023	Krasnodar	0	(0)
2019	→ Krasnodar-3	2	(0)
2022–2023	→ Krasnodar-2	7	(1)
2024	Metallurg Lipetsk	26	(0)
2025	Dynamo Vologda	15	(1)
2026–	Torpedo Vladimir	12	(0)
- * Club domestic league appearances and goals as of 1 November 2026

Stepan Vladimirovich Komar (Russian: Степан Владимирович Комар; born 17 March 2003) is a Russian footballer who plays as a defender for Torpedo Vladimir.

== Club career ==
He made his debut in the Russian Second League for Krasnodar-3 on 21 September 2019 in a game against Makhachkala.

He made his debut in the Russian First League for Krasnodar-2 on 7 August 2022 in a game against KAMAZ Naberezhnye Chelny.
