= Yevgeni Zarva =

Russian footballer

Personal information
- Full name: Yevgeni Nikolayevich Zarva
- Date of birth: 12 December 1962 (age 63)
- Place of birth: Rubtsovsk, Russian SFSR
- Height: 1.88 m (6 ft 2 in)
- Position: Forward

Youth career
- FC Torpedo Rubtsovsk

Senior career*
Years	Team	Apps	(Gls)
1980–1982	FC Torpedo Rubtsovsk	63	(13)
1983–1984	FC Dynamo Barnaul	46	(39)
1985–1989	FC Geolog Tyumen	162	(70)
1990–1991	FC Uralmash Yekaterinburg	53	(17)
1992–1993	FC Dynamo-Gazovik Tyumen	28	(3)
1993	FC Sibir Kurgan	11	(4)
1994–1996	FC Irtysh Tobolsk	70	(34)
2001	FC Tyumen-d Tyumen		
- * Club domestic league appearances and goals

Yevgeni Nikolayevich Zarva (Russian: Евгений Николаевич Зарва; born 12 December 1962 in Rubtsovsk) is a former Russian football player.

His son Dmitri Zarva is a footballer as well.
