= Artyom Antipov =

Russian professional football player

Personal information
- Full name: Artyom Yuryevich Antipov
- Date of birth: 28 November 1988 (age 37)
- Place of birth: Sterlitamak, Bashkortostan, Russian SFSR
- Height: 1.74 m (5 ft 9 in)
- Positions: Midfielder; forward

Youth career
- Rovesnik Sterlitamak
- Kauchuk Sterlitamak

Senior career*
Years	Team	Apps	(Gls)
2007	FC Sodovik Sterlitamak	14	(2)
2008–2009	FC Dynamo Vologda	61	(7)
2010	FC Sakhalin Yuzhno-Sakhalinsk	17	(4)
2011–2012	FC Mostovik-Primorye Ussuriysk	35	(3)
2012–2013	FC Pskov-747	21	(0)
2013–2014	FC Chelyabinsk	15	(0)
2014–2015	FC Pskov-747	28	(5)
2015	FC Sterlitamak		
2016	FC Biolog-Novokubansk	23	(1)
2017–2018	FC Lyubertsy		
2019	FC Keramik Balashikha		
2020	Olimp-SKOPA Balashikha		
2021	FC Kobart-Lobnya-2		
- * Club domestic league appearances and goals

Artyom Yuryevich Antipov (Russian: Артём Юрьевич Антипов; born 28 November 1988) is a Russian former professional football player.

== Club career ==
He played in the Russian Football National League for FC Sodovik Sterlitamak in 2007. During his later career he played for Russian Professional Football League until 2016, also participating in Russian Cup matches for such teams as FC Dynamo Vologda, FC Sakhalin Yuzhno-Sakhalinsk, FC Mostovik-Primorye Ussuriysk, FC Chelyabinsk, FC Pskov-747 and FC Biolog-Novokubansk. Later in career he went on to play in the Russian Amateur Football League (III Division - Moscow Oblast) for FC Lyubertsy, FC Keramik Balashikha, Olimp-SKOPA and Kobart-Lobnya-2.
