= Marat Tsallagov =

Russian footballer

Personal information
- Full name: Marat Soslanovich Tsallagov
- Date of birth: 23 March 1982 (age 44)
- Place of birth: Ordzhonikidze, Russian SFSR, Soviet Union
- Height: 1.76 m (5 ft 9 in)
- Position: Defender

Youth career
- DYUSSh Mozdok

Senior career*
Years	Team	Apps	(Gls)
2000–2001	Mozdok	51	(1)
2002	Krasnoznamensk	31	(0)
2003	Uralan Elista	14	(0)
2004–2005	Alania Vladikavkaz	2	(0)
2005	→ Torpedo Zhodino (loan)	0	(0)
2006	Mashuk-KMV Pyatigorsk	33	(1)
2008	Chernomorets Novorossiysk	5	(0)
2008	Avtodor Vladikavkaz	4	(1)
2011	Mostovik-Primorye Ussuriysk	11	(0)
- * Club domestic league appearances and goals

Marat Soslanovich Tsallagov (Russian: Марат Сосланович Цаллагов; born 23 March 1982) is a Russian former footballer who played as defender.
