= Vladimir Malakhov (footballer) =

Russian footballer and coach (born 1955)

Personal information
- Full name: Vladimir Mikhailovich Malakhov
- Date of birth: 10 October 1955 (age 71)
- Place of birth: Baku, Azerbaijani SSR
- Height: 1.82 m (5 ft 11 1/2 in)
- Position: Goalkeeper

Youth career
- Neftçi PFK

Senior career*
Years	Team	Apps	(Gls)
1974	FK Khazar Sumgayit		
1976	Neftçi PFK	0	(0)
1976–1977	FC Druzhba Maykop	7	(0)
1978	FC Mashuk Pyatigorsk		
1979–1986	FC Dynamo Stavropol	177	(0)
1987–1988	FC Atommash Volgodonsk	62	(0)
1989–1992	FC Dynamo Stavropol	90	(0)
1992	FC Dynamo Izobilny	4	(0)
1993	FC Terek Grozny	14	(0)

Managerial career
- 1995–1996: FC Dynamo Stavropol (assistant)
- 1999: FC Dynamo Stavropol (assistant)
- 2002–2003: FC Zhemchuzhina Budyonnovsk (assistant)
- 2008: FC Stavropol (assistant)
- 2009: FC Stavropolye-2009 (director)
- * Club domestic league appearances and goals

Vladimir Mikhailovich Malakhov (Russian: Владимир Михайлович Малахов; born 10 October 1955) is a Russian professional football coach and a former player.
