= Dmitri Vyazmikin =

Russian footballer

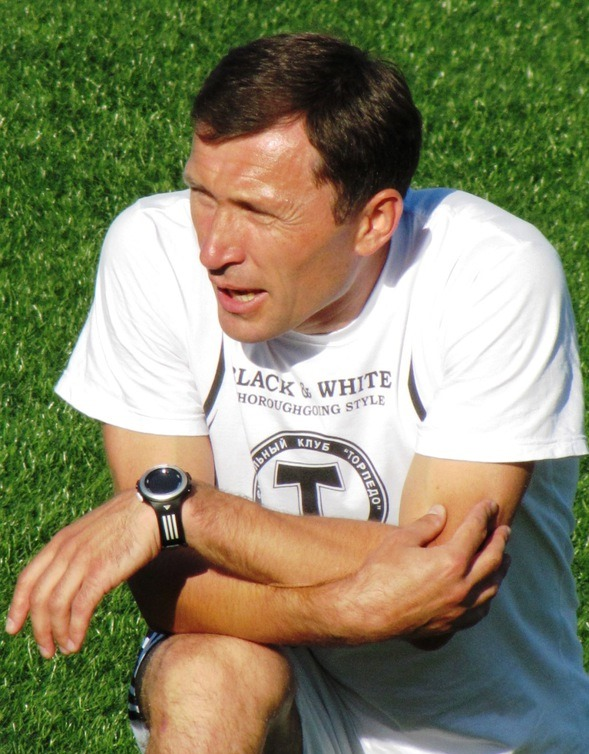

Personal information
- Full name: Dmitri Vladimirovich Vyazmikin
- Date of birth: 27 September 1972 (age 54)
- Place of birth: Vladimir, Soviet Union
- Height: 1.87 m (6 ft 2 in)
- Position: Forward

Senior career*
Years	Team	Apps	(Gls)
1992–1994	Torpedo Vladimir	96	(41)
1995–1996	Sokol-PZD Saratov	57	(18)
1996	Gazovik-Gazprom Izhevsk	17	(6)
1997–1998	Shinnik Yaroslavl	56	(4)
1999	Lokomotiv Nizhny Novgorod	28	(5)
2000–2001	Torpedo Moscow	56	(25)
2002–2003	Uralan Elista	31	(1)
2003	Alania Vladikavkaz	3	(0)
2004–2010	Torpedo Vladimir	208	(105)
2011	FC Spartak Kostroma	33	(7)
Total		585	(212)

Managerial career
- 2011–2012: FC Torpedo Vladimir (coach)
- 2012–2018: FC Torpedo Vladimir (director)
- 2018–2021: FC Torpedo Vladimir
- 2021: FC Torpedo Vladimir (director of sports)
- 2021–2022: FC Khimki-M
- 2022: FC Olimp-Dolgoprudny (technical director)
- 2022–2023: FC Khimki (assistant)
- 2022–2023: FC Khimki-M
- * Club domestic league appearances and goals

Dmitri Vladimirovich Vyazmikin (Russian: Дмитрий Владимирович Вязьмикин; born 27 September 1972) is a Russian football coach and a former player. He was a striker. Dmitri Vyazmikin is most famous for becoming Russian Top Division top scorer in 2001.

== Club career ==
Vyazmikin played in various leagues of Russian football, including Russian Top Division in 1997-2003. In 2000, he won the league bronze medals with Torpedo Moscow, and in 2001 he became the league top scorer with 18 goals in 29 matches.

Dmitri Vyazmikin has also scored two goals for Torpedo Moscow in the UEFA Cup 2001-02.

== Honours ==
- Russian Top Division top scorer: 2001 (18 goals).
- Russian Second Division Zone West top scorer: 2004 (25 goals).
- Russian Second Division, Zone West best player: 2004, 2009, 2010.
