= Fyodor Dyachenko =

Russian footballer

Personal information
- Full name: Fyodor Sergeyevich Dyachenko
- Date of birth: 4 May 1988 (age 38)
- Place of birth: Krasnodar, Russian SFSR
- Height: 1.92 m (6 ft 4 in)
- Position: Goalkeeper

Senior career*
Years	Team	Apps	(Gls)
2005–2008	FC Krasnodar-2000	63	(0)
2008–2009	FC Zvezda Irkutsk	6	(0)
2009	→ FC Mordovia Saransk (loan)	18	(0)
2010	FC Mordovia Saransk	16	(0)
2011–2012	FC Fakel Voronezh	18	(0)
2012	FC Rostov	0	(0)
2012	→ FC Mordovia Saransk (loan)	0	(0)
2013	FC Sibir Novosibirsk	0	(0)
2013	FC Fakel Voronezh	2	(0)
2014–2015	FC Torpedo Armavir	22	(0)
2015–2016	FC Spartak-UGP Anapa (amateur)		
2017–2020	FC Kuban-Holding Pavlovskaya (amateur)		
2020	FC Kuban-Holding Pavlovskaya	0	(0)
- * Club domestic league appearances and goals

Fyodor Sergeyevich Dyachenko (Russian: Фёдор Серге́евич Дьяченко; born 4 May 1988) is a Russian former professional football player.

== Club career ==
He made his Russian Football National League debut for FC Zvezda Irkutsk on 5 September 2008 in a game against FC Torpedo Moscow. He played 2 more seasons in the FNL for FC Mordovia Saransk and FC Fakel Voronezh.

== Honours ==
- Russian Second Division, Zone Ural-Povolzhye best goalkeeper: 2009.
