= Maksim Zhivnovitskiy =

Russian footballer

Personal information
- Full name: Maksim Nikolayevich Zhivnovitskiy
- Date of birth: 25 July 1984 (age 42)
- Height: 1.79 m (5 ft 10 1/2 in)
- Positions: Forward; midfielder

Youth career
- FC SKA-Energiya Khabarovsk

Senior career*
Years	Team	Apps	(Gls)
2002–2007	FC SKA-Energiya Khabarovsk	142	(16)
2007	FC Amur Blagoveshchensk	10	(1)
2008	FC Chita	24	(9)
2009	FC Sakhalin Yuzhno-Sakhalinsk	26	(2)
2010–2011	FC SKA-Energiya Khabarovsk	39	(2)
2012–2014	FC Smena Komsomolsk-na-Amure	58	(7)
- * Club domestic league appearances and goals

Maksim Nikolayevich Zhivnovitskiy (Russian: Максим Николаевич Живновицкий; born 25 July 1984) is a former Russian professional football player.

== Club career ==
He played seven seasons in the Russian Football National League for FC SKA-Energiya Khabarovsk.
