= FC Birobidzhan =

Russian football club

FK Birobidzhan
- Founded: 2000
- Ground: Druzhba Stadium
- Capacity: 8000
- Chairman: Arkady Zaitsev
- League: Russian Amateur Football League
- 2010: 7th

FK Birobidzhan is a Russian football club located in Birobidzhan, the center of the Jewish Autonomous Oblast, Russia. It plays in the Russian Amateur Football League, Zone Far East.

== History ==
Founded in 2000, FK Birobidzhan was built on the basis of local talent. They won multiple championships of the Far East Group but several years later the results began to stagnate.

=== 2009–2012 ===
Way before, in 2009, the club finished 5th in their 8-team Far East sector with 5 wins and three ties. But in 2010, they recorded a mere 2 points in a 7-team zone. \ They came second to last in 2011 out of 8 teams.

Birobidzhan began their most promising season in 2012 aiming to reach promotion to professionalism. It began with a 4–0 heavy defeat to FC Belogorsk, soon followed by enduring an 8-match losing streak before winning one game opposing the development squad of FC Yakutiya Yakutsk. With 37 goals conceded all season with an average of four goals per game, they finished with 3 points, eradicating any chance of gaining promotion.

For one year, (2013) FK Birobidzhan was defunct and ceased to exist. It was resurrected in 2014, with the director Arkady Zaitsev saying the conditions were 'that it played only local players, without the involvement of foreign players.'
