= Maksim Galiullin =

Russian footballer

Personal information
- Full name: Maksim Flunovich Galiullin
- Date of birth: 1 April 1988 (age 38)
- Height: 1.75 m (5 ft 9 in)
- Position: Striker

Senior career*
Years	Team	Apps	(Gls)
2006–2010	FC Ural Yekaterinburg	20	(0)
2009	→ FC Dynamo Barnaul (loan)	22	(8)
2010	→ FC Gornyak Uchaly (loan)	5	(0)
2011–2012	FC Dynamo Barnaul	11	(1)
- * Club domestic league appearances and goals

Maksim Flunovich Galiullin (Russian: Максим Флунович Галиуллин; born 1 April 1988) is a former Russian professional football player.

== Club career ==
He played two seasons in the Russian Football National League for FC Ural Yekaterinburg.
