= Maksim Gerin =

Russian-Moldovan footballer

Personal information
- Full name: Maksim Valeryevich Gerin
- Date of birth: 4 September 1984 (age 42)
- Height: 1.76 m (5 ft 9 1/2 in)
- Position: Midfielder

Senior career*
Years	Team	Apps	(Gls)
2002–2003	FC Tiraspol	4	(0)
2004	FC Lokomotiv Kaluga	1	(0)
2006–2009	FC Iskra-Stal Rîbniţa	47	(5)
2010	FC Sakhalin Yuzhno-Sakhalinsk	10	(0)
- * Club domestic league appearances and goals

Maksim Valeryevich Gerin (Russian: Максим Валерьевич Герин; born 4 September 1984) is a Russian former professional football player. He also holds Moldovan citizenship.
