= Aleksei Usanov =

Russian footballer

Personal information
- Full name: Aleksei Ivanovich Usanov
- Date of birth: 14 January 2001 (age 25)
- Place of birth: Tosno, Leningrad Oblast, Russia
- Height: 1.69 m (5 ft 7 in)
- Position: Midfielder

Team information
- Current team: Cherepovets
- Number: 30

Youth career
- 2006–2014: SDYuShOR №4 Lviv
- 2014–2016: SDYuShOR Zenit Saint-Petersburg
- 2017–2020: Dynamo Moscow

Senior career*
Years	Team	Apps	(Gls)
2020–2021	Dynamo-2 Moscow	16	(0)
2022–2023	Torpedo Moscow	8	(0)
2022–2023	→ Torpedo-2 Moscow	27	(3)
2024	Rotor Volgograd	16	(1)
2025	Dnepr Mogilev	26	(6)
2026–	Cherepovets	22	(2)

International career
2016	Russia U-15	4	(0)
2016–2017	Russia U-16	9	(1)
2017–2018	Russia U-17	15	(0)
2019	Russia U-18	3	(0)
- * Club domestic league appearances and goals as of 1 November 2026

Aleksei Ivanovich Usanov (Russian: Алексей Иванович Усанов; born 14 January 2001) is a Russian footballer who plays as a midfielder for Cherepovets.

== Club career ==
He made his Russian Professional Football League debut for Dynamo-2 Moscow on 12 September 2020 in a game against Tver.

On May 28, 2022, he signed his first professional contract with Torpedo-2.

He made his debut in the Russian Premier League for Torpedo Moscow on 27 May 2023 in a game against Orenburg.
