= Aleksei Krasnokutskiy =

Russian footballer

Personal information
- Full name: Aleksei Aleksandrovich Krasnokutskiy
- Date of birth: 11 March 1986 (age 40)
- Height: 2.02 m (6 ft 8 in)
- Position: Goalkeeper

Team information
- Current team: FC Novosibirsk (GK coach)

Youth career
- FC Chkalovets Novosibirsk

Senior career*
| Years | Team | Apps | (Gls) |
| 2002–2003 | FC Chkalovets-Olimpik Novosibirsk | 1 | (0) |
| 2005–2006 | FC Sibir Novosibirsk | 8 | (0) |
| 2007 | FC Sibir-NTsVSM-2 Novosibirsk (D4) | | |
| 2007 | FC Irtysh-1946 Omsk | 7 | (0) |
| 2008 | FC Sibir Novosibirsk | 0 | (0) |
| 2008 | FC Sibir-2 Novosibirsk | 24 | (0) |
| 2009–2010 | FC Irtysh Omsk | 56 | (0) |
| 2011 | FC Zhemchuzhina-Sochi | 0 | (0) |
| 2011–2014 | FC Shinnik Yaroslavl | 38 | (0) |
| 2014–2015 | FC Sibir-2 Novosibirsk | 20 | (0) |

Managerial career
- 2018: FC Sibir-2 Novosibirsk (GK coach)
- 2019: FC Sibir Novosibirsk (GK coach)
- 2019–: FC Novosibirsk (GK coach)
- * Club domestic league appearances and goals

Aleksei Aleksandrovich Krasnokutskiy (Russian: Алексей Александрович Краснокутский; born 11 March 1986) is a Russian professional football coach and a former player. He works as a goalkeepers coach with FC Novosibirsk.

== Club career ==
He played 4 seasons in the Russian Football National League for FC Irtysh Omsk and FC Shinnik Yaroslavl.

== Honours ==
- Russian Second Division, Zone East best goalkeeper: 2009.
