= Dynamo Stadium (Stavropol) =

Multi-use stadium in Stavropol, Russia

Coordinates: 45°02′32.64″N 41°58′12″E

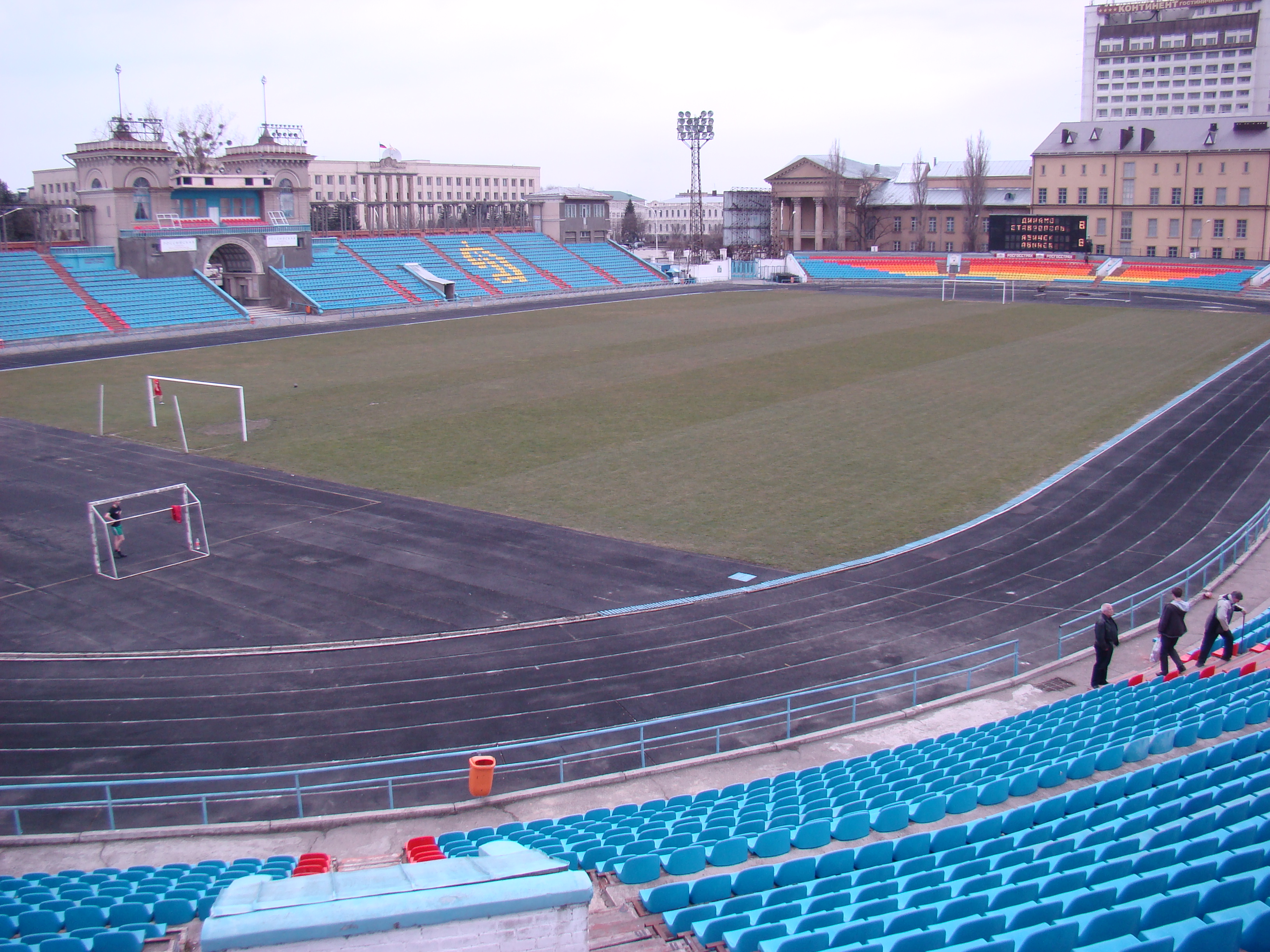
- Interactive map of Dynamo Stadium
- Full name: Dynamo Stadium
- Location: Stavropol, Russia
- Capacity: 15,589

Construction
- Opened: 1 May 1920

Tenants
- FC Dynamo GTS Stavropol (1986–2015); FC Stavropol (2005–2010); FC Stavropolye-2009 (2009–2010); PFC Dynamo Stavropol

The Dynamo Stadium is a multi-use stadium in Stavropol, Russia. It is used as the stadium of PFC Dynamo Stavropol matches. The capacity of the stadium is 15,589 spectators.

== Events ==
To celebrate the 230-day anniversary of Stavropol, on 29 September 2007 a concert was held with singers like Alla Pugacheva, Philip Kirkorov, Julia Savicheva and Valdis Pelsh.
