= Anton Vasilyev (footballer) =

Russian footballer

Personal information
- Full name: Anton Aleksandrovich Vasilyev
- Date of birth: 6 February 1983 (age 43)
- Height: 1.85 m (6 ft 1 in)
- Position: Defender

Youth career
- DYuSSh-3 Kurgan

Senior career*
Years	Team	Apps	(Gls)
2003–2005	FC Tobol Kurgan	92	(4)
2006	FC Energetik Uren	23	(4)
2007–2008	FC Tyumen	59	(4)
2009–2010	FC Irtysh Omsk	46	(8)
2011	FC Ufa	12	(1)
2011–2012	FC Tyumen	11	(1)
2012–2013	FC Sakhalin Yuzhno-Sakhalinsk	28	(2)
2013–2014	FC Amur-2010 Blagoveshchensk	23	(1)
2014–2015	PFC Spartak Nalchik	28	(4)
2015–2016	FC Dynamo Barnaul	17	(0)
2016–2018	FC Tobol Kurgan (amateur)		
- * Club domestic league appearances and goals

Anton Aleksandrovich Vasilyev (Russian: Антон Александрович Васильев; born 6 February 1983) is a former Russian professional football player.

== Club career ==
He played in the Russian Football National League for FC Irtysh Omsk in 2010.
