= Sergey Verkashansky =

Russian footballer

Personal information
- Full name: Sergey Sergeyevich Verkashansky
- Date of birth: 6 September 1989 (age 37)
- Place of birth: Biryuch, Russian SFSR
- Height: 1.75 m (5 ft 9 in)
- Position: Forward

Senior career*
Years	Team	Apps	(Gls)
2009–2013	Torpedo Armavir	101	(48)
2013	Chernomorets Novorossiysk	22	(19)
2014–2017	Volgar Astrakhan	88	(14)
2018	FC Khimki	11	(1)
2018–2019	FC Armavir	19	(0)
2019–2020	Mashuk-KMV Pyatigorsk	15	(3)
- * Club domestic league appearances and goals

Sergey Sergeyevich Verkashansky (Russian: Сергей Сергеевич Веркашанский; born 6 September 1989) is a Russian former professional football player.

== Club career ==
He made his Russian Football National League debut for FC Volgar Astrakhan on 6 July 2014 in a game against FC Tyumen.
