= Dmitri Turutin =

Russian footballer

Personal information
- Full name: Dmitri Grigoryevich Turutin
- Date of birth: 10 April 1981 (age 45)
- Place of birth: Kaliningrad, Russian SFSR
- Height: 1.80 m (5 ft 11 in)
- Position: Midfielder

Team information
- Current team: FC Sakhalin Yuzhno-Sakhalinsk

Youth career
- SDYuSShOR-5 Yunost Kaliningrad

Senior career*
Years	Team	Apps	(Gls)
2000–2001	FC Baltika Kaliningrad	2	(0)
2001	FC Balakovo	32	(1)
2002	FC Avtomobilist Noginsk	32	(1)
2003	FC Chkalovets-1936 Novosibirsk	10	(0)
2003	FC Dynamo Barnaul	9	(0)
2004–2005	FC Chkalovets-1936 Novosibirsk	33	(1)
2005–2006	FC Dynamo Barnaul	41	(5)
2007–2010	FC Sibiryak Bratsk	102	(22)
2011–2013	FC Sakhalin Yuzhno-Sakhalinsk	39	(4)
- * Club domestic league appearances and goals

Dmitri Grigoryevich Turutin (Russian: Дмитрий Григорьевич Турутин; born 10 April 1981) is a former Russian professional football player.

== Club career ==
He played in the Russian Football National League for FC Baltika Kaliningrad in 2000.
