= Kirill Marushchak =

Russian footballer

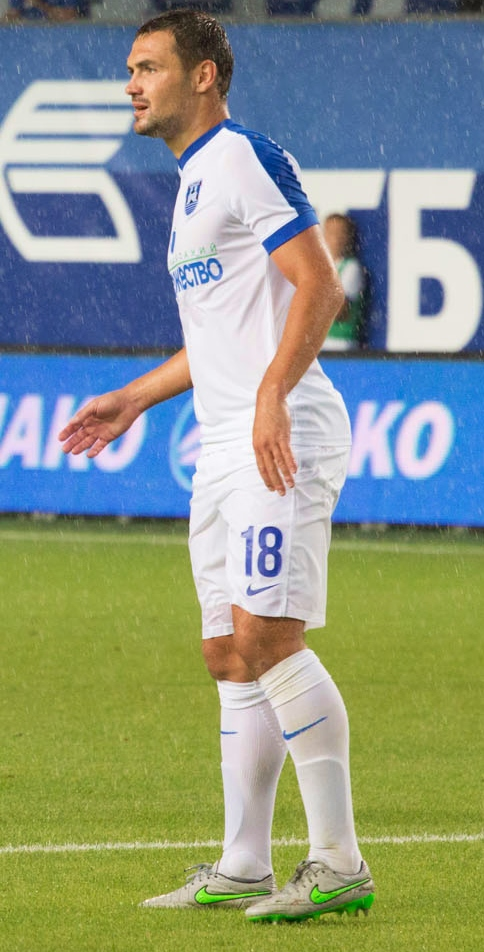

Personal information
- Full name: Kirill Valeryevich Marushchak
- Date of birth: 16 May 1986 (age 40)
- Place of birth: Kaliningrad, Russian SFSR
- Height: 1.82 m (6 ft 0 in)
- Position: Defender

Senior career*
Years	Team	Apps	(Gls)
2006–2007	FC Baltika-2 Kaliningrad	60	(2)
2008	FC Dynamo St. Petersburg	28	(1)
2009	FC Dynamo Bryansk	28	(1)
2010–2013	FC Volgar Astrakhan	95	(2)
2013	FC Baltika Kaliningrad	2	(0)
2013–2016	FC Yenisey Krasnoyarsk	68	(3)
2016–2017	FC Baltika Kaliningrad	24	(3)
2017–2019	FC Luch Vladivostok	84	(3)
- * Club domestic league appearances and goals

Kirill Valeryevich Marushchak (Russian: Кирилл Валерьевич Марущак; born 16 May 1986) is a Russian former professional football player.

== Club career ==
He made his Russian Football National League debut for FC Volgar-Gazprom Astrakhan on 27 March 2010 in a game against FC KAMAZ Naberezhnye Chelny.
