= Andrei Krupenin =

Russian footballer

Personal information
- Full name: Andrei Anatolyevich Krupenin
- Date of birth: 29 January 1981 (age 45)
- Place of birth: Pskov, Russian SFSR
- Height: 1.82 m (6 ft 0 in)
- Positions: Defender; midfielder

Senior career*
Years	Team	Apps	(Gls)
2000–2001	FC Pskov-2000	25	(2)
2002	FC Khimki	6	(0)
2003	FC Pskov-2000	13	(0)
2003	FC Kristall Smolensk	19	(0)
2004	FC Almaz Moscow	6	(0)
2005–2006	FC Spartak Lukhovitsy	58	(3)
2007–2008	FC Dynamo Vologda	59	(2)
2009	FC Dynamo St. Petersburg	30	(1)
2010–2017	FC Pskov-747	162	(6)
- * Club domestic league appearances and goals

Andrei Anatolyevich Krupenin (Russian: Андрей Анатольевич Крупенин; born 29 January 1981) is a former Russian professional football player.

== Club career ==
He played two seasons in the Russian Football National League for FC Khimki and FC Kristall Smolensk.
