= FC Stavropol =

- Full name: Football Club Stavropol
- Founded: 2005
- Dissolved: 2010
- Ground: Dynamo Stadium
- Capacity: 16,000
- Chairman: Valeri Kudryavenko
- Manager: vacant
- League: Unknown
- 2009: Russian Second Division, Zone South, 2nd

FC Stavropol (Russian: ФК Ставрополь) was a Russian football club from Stavropol, founded in 2005. It was playing on the amateur level since its founding until 2008, when FC Stavropol came 2nd in the South zone of the Amateur Football League and advanced to the Russian Second Division. In February 2010, FC Stavropol dropped out of the Russian Second Division for financial reasons.
