= Dmitri Zarva =

Russian footballer

Personal information
- Full name: Dmitri Yevgenyevich Zarva
- Date of birth: 15 June 1985 (age 41)
- Place of birth: Tyumen, Russian SFSR
- Height: 1.92 m (6 ft 3 1/2 in)
- Position: Forward

Youth career
- FC Geolog Tyumen

Senior career*
Years	Team	Apps	(Gls)
2002	FC Tyumen-D		
2003	FC SDYuShOR-Sibnefteprovod Tyumen		
2004	FC Krasnodar-2000	7	(1)
2005	FC Tyumen (amateur)		
2005	FC Krasnodar-2000	8	(2)
2006–2012	FC Tyumen	146	(50)
2012–2014	FC Chelyabinsk	53	(35)
2014–2015	FC Tyumen	15	(1)
- * Club domestic league appearances and goals

Dmitri Yevgenyevich Zarva (Russian: Дмитрий Евгеньевич Зарва; born 15 June 1985) is a former Russian professional football player.

== Club career ==
He played in the Russian Football National League for FC Tyumen in 2014.

== Personal life ==
His father Yevgeni Zarva played in the Russian Premier League for FC Dynamo-Gazovik Tyumen.
