= Vladimir Levshin =

Russian footballer

Personal information
- Full name: Vladimir Sergeyevich Levshin
- Date of birth: 3 February 1983 (age 43)
- Height: 1.89 m (6 ft 2 1/2 in)
- Positions: Forward; midfielder

Senior career*
Years	Team	Apps	(Gls)
2000	FC Rostselmash-2 Rostov-on-Don	11	(0)
2001	FC Rostselmash Rostov-on-Don	0	(0)
2001–2002	FC Shakhtyor Shakhty	27	(9)
2003–2004	FC Kavkaztransgaz Izobilny	53	(13)
2005	FC SKA Rostov-on-Don	22	(7)
2006–2008	FC Zvezda Irkutsk	95	(39)
2009	FC Nosta Novotroitsk	15	(0)
2009–2010	FC Salyut Belgorod	34	(2)
2011	FC Metallurg Lipetsk	14	(2)
2011–2012	FC Salyut Belgorod	17	(6)
2012–2013	FC Baltika Kaliningrad	13	(2)
- * Club domestic league appearances and goals

Vladimir Sergeyevich Levshin (Russian: Владимир Сергеевич Лёвшин; born 3 February 1983) is a former Russian professional football player.

== Club career ==
He played 6 seasons in the Russian Football National League for 4 different clubs.

== Honours ==
- Russian Second Division Zone East top scorer: 2006 (22 goals).
