= Anton Bagayev =

Russian footballer

Personal information
- Full name: Anton Vyacheslavovich Bagayev
- Date of birth: 11 June 1979 (age 47)
- Place of birth: Omsk, Russian SFSR
- Height: 1.80 m (5 ft 11 in)
- Positions: Striker; midfielder

Youth career
- FC Irtysh Omsk

Senior career*
Years	Team	Apps	(Gls)
1999–2000	FC Irtysh Omsk	51	(4)
2001–2002	FC Chkalovets-Olimpik Novosibirsk	46	(4)
2003–2019	FC Irtysh Omsk	386	(103)
- * Club domestic league appearances and goals

Anton Vyacheslavovich Bagayev (Russian: Антон Вячеславович Багаев; born 11 June 1979) is a former Russian professional football player.

== Club career ==
He played in the Russian Football National League for FC Irtysh Omsk in 2010.

== Honours ==
- Russian Second Division Zone East top scorer: 2008 (14 goals).

== Personal life ==
He is the younger brother of Andrei Bagayev.
