= Andrei Meshcheryakov (serial killer) =

Russian serial killer

- Born: Andrei Mikhailovich Meshcheryakov; 9 February 1978 (age 48); Voskresensk, Moscow Oblast, RSFSR
- Other names: "The Balashikhinsky Maniac" "The Wheelie Strangler"
- Conviction: Murder
- Penalty: 25 years imprisonment

Details
- Victims: 5
- Span of crimes: September – November 2002
- Country: Russia
- State: Moscow
- Date apprehended: 12 November 2002

Andrei Mikhailovich Meshcheryakov (Russian: Андре́й Миха́йлович Мещеряко́в; born 9 February 1978), known as The Balashikhinsky Maniac (Russian: Балашихинский маньяк), is a Russian robber and serial killer who killed 5 women in the Moscow Oblast in 2002.

== Biography ==
Meshcheryakov was born on 9 February 1978, in the Moscow Oblast. He had two brothers and grew up in a good family. Before the murders, he had no connections to the crime world. After graduating from high school, he served in the army, then graduated from the vocational school with a welder speciality. He worked as a driver in a motor company in his hometown and had impeccable characteristics. However, as Meshcheryakov's parents later told the investigators, he had suffered a brain injury as a child, and it was not possible to overcome the negative consequences in the end. In the army, Meshcheryakov lay in a hospital after a nervous breakdown, and later became ill with diabetes mellitus. His friends noted that Meshcheryakov was a rather reserved and uncommunicative person, but none of them could believe that he would later become a murderer.

The first murder Meshcheryakov committed was in September 2002, in the area of the Lytkarinskoye Highway. Having deceived a woman into his car pretending to be a taxi driver, he dragged her into the forest, killed her and then took her money and valuables, leaving the corpse in the lover's lane, where it was later discovered. After this, Meshcheryakov committed four more murders, all of them in the same way: he told his victims that during the installation of gas-cylinder equipment in his car, an error occurred, and he needed to change the back seats to tighten the screws. While sitting in the backseat, he tied a rope around his victims' necks, and strangled them, taking their money and valuables afterwards.

=== Arrest and trial ===
Meshcheryakov was detained for the first time on suspicion of murder near the Moscow Kazansky railway station in Moscow, where he tried to sell the belongings of the dead. However, he insisted that he bought these things from an unknown man. There was no evidence against him, and police officers had to let him go. On 12 November 2002, Meshcheryakov's car was stopped on a GAI post on one of the motor roads of the Moscow Oblast. In the car, the windshield and the front panel were smashed. As it later turned out, Meshcheryakov tried to stifle the sixth victim but later damaged his car. As a result, Meshcheryakov with the victim to keep silent about it, but he was still detained.

Initially, Meshcheryakov confessed only to the attempted murder of the sixth victim but soon confessed to the remaining murders. Despite the psychopathic disorders found in Meshcheryakov during the forensic examination, he was found to be sane because he could fully account for his actions. In September 2003, the Moscow Regional Court sentenced him to 25 years in prison, instead of life imprisonment, which the prosecution required. At the same time, he was prescribed compulsory outpatient treatment by a psychiatrist. Meshcheryakov cried on the last day of the trial, asking for forgiveness for the 5 murders, fully admitting his guilt. The Supreme Court of Russia upheld the verdict without changing.

== See also ==
- List of Russian serial killers
