= Vitali Burmakov =

Russian professional football player

Personal information
- Full name: Vitali Aleksandrovich Burmakov
- Date of birth: 30 June 1987 (age 39)
- Place of birth: Dimitrovgrad, Russian SFSR
- Height: 1.80 m (5 ft 11 in)
- Position: Forward

Senior career*
Years	Team	Apps	(Gls)
2005	FC NTTs-Togliatti (amateur)		
2006	FC KAMAZ Naberezhnye Chelny	16	(2)
2006	FC Rostov	0	(0)
2007	FC Sodovik Sterlitamak	29	(12)
2008–2011	FC Chernomorets Novorossiysk	57	(13)
2008	→ FC Lukhovitsy (loan)	10	(3)
2009	→ FC Volga Ulyanovsk (loan)	24	(12)
2011	FC Volga Ulyanovsk	8	(5)
2012	FC Zenit Penza	13	(1)
2014–2015	FC Afips Afipsky	12	(6)
2015	FC Lada-Togliatti	3	(0)
2016	FC Dimitrovgrad (amateur)		
2017	FC Torpedo Dimitrovgrad (amateur)		
2018–2019	FC Khimik-Avgust Vurnary (amateur)		
2020	FC Lada Dimitrovgrad	0	(0)
- * Club domestic league appearances and goals

Vitali Aleksandrovich Burmakov (Russian: Виталий Александрович Бурмаков; born 30 June 1987) is a Russian former professional football player.

== Club career ==
He played 4 seasons in the Russian Football National League for FC KAMAZ Naberezhnye Chelny, FC Sodovik Sterlitamak and FC Chernomorets Novorossiysk.
