= Igor Borozdin =

Russian footballer

Personal information
- Full name: Igor Yuryevich Borozdin
- Date of birth: 5 October 1988 (age 38)
- Place of birth: Kursk, Russian SFSR
- Height: 1.81 m (5 ft 11 1/2 in)
- Position: Midfielder

Senior career*
Years	Team	Apps	(Gls)
2007–2014	Avangard Kursk	158	(25)
2015	Chernomorets Novorossiysk	14	(3)
2015	Lokomotiv Liski	15	(1)
2016	Isloch Minsk Raion	9	(0)
2016	Chayka Peschanokopskoye	13	(2)
2017	Mashuk-KMV Pyatigorsk	11	(1)
2017–2018	Dynamo Bryansk	14	(0)
- * Club domestic league appearances and goals

Igor Yuryevich Borozdin (Russian: Игорь Юрьевич Бороздин; born 5 October 1988) is a former Russian professional football player.

== Club career ==
He played in the Russian Football National League for FC Avangard Kursk in 2010.

== Honours ==
- Russian Second Division, Zone Center best midfielder: 2009.
