= FC Torpedo Vladimir =

Russian football club

- Full name: Football Club Torpedo Vladimir
- Founded: 1959; 67 years ago
- Ground: Torpedo, Vladimir
- Capacity: 19,700
- Owner: Vladimir + Vladimir Oblast
- Chairman: Ivan Karatygin
- Manager: Aslan Zaseev
- League: Russian Second League, Division B, Group 2
- 2026: 8th
- Website: fc-tv.ru
Home colours	Away colours

Football Club Torpedo Vladimir (Russian: Футбольный клуб "Торпедо" Владимир) is a Russian football club from Vladimir, founded in 1959. In 2011, they played in the Russian First Division after winning their zone of the Russian Second Division in 2010.

The club has been called Trud (1959), Traktor (1960–1968) and Motor (1969–1972). Their best historical result was 6th place in the Russian First Division in 1993. They played on the second-highest level (Soviet First League and Russian First Division from 1960 to 1963, 1992 to 1994, and again from 2011).

== History ==
The football team of masters in Vladimir was organized in 1959 on the initiative of the regional committee of the Communist Party and the leadership of the local tractor plant. The first success for Vladimir football players came in 1966, when FC Traktor took first place in the zonal tournament and second in the semi-finals. In the next decade, the team twice took first place in its zone and three times participated in the semi-final tournaments of the strongest teams of class "B" and the second league, but failed to achieve a promotion into the higher league.

In 1982 and 1983, Traktor did not take part in the USSR championships. In 1984, Vladimir's team was again given the opportunity to play in the second league. In the last eight championships, Torpedo's best results were 4th in 1989 and 3rd in 1991. The last success almost brought the team to the top league of the Russian championship.

By the decision of the Russian Football Union, Torpedo still ended up in the first league. In 1993, the team achieved the highest achievement in its history – 6th place in the western zone of the first league. At the end of that championship, 21-year-old Dmitry Vyazmikin announced himself loudly, scoring 8 goals from the 30th to the 40th rounds. But 1994 turned out to be fatal – Torpedo was not saved from relegation to the second league even by Vyazmikin's 24 goals.

In transit through the second league in 1995, Torpedo, who lost most of the squad before the start of the season (Maxim Putilin, Igor Aslanyan, Vladislav Khakhalev moved to Asmaral, Igor Varlamov to Dynamo Moscow, Dmitry Vyazmikin to Sokol Saratov), proceeded in the third league, where they played two seasons. A successful performance in 1997 allowed the Vladimir team to secure a place in the second division, but only for two years – following the results of the 1999 championship, the Vladimir Torpedo lost its professional status.

In the 2000 season, Torpedo players won the championship and the Golden Ring Interregional Football Federation Cup and returned to the second division. The first three seasons in the West zone were held for Torpedo under the sign of a struggle for survival, but already in 2004 the team was able to win the championship. This was facilitated by the return of Dmitry Vyazmikin, Evgeny Durnev, Oleg Glebov from the clubs of the Premier League and the first division to the team and the arrival of the team of players of Arsenal Tula – Vyacheslav Krykanov, Dmitry Gunko, Sergey Kirpichnikov and Sergey Egorov. The head coach of the Vladimir team was Oleg Stogov. On 2 February 2005, the club's management announced their refusal to play in the first division, losing their place to FC Petrotrest.

In 2005, the team made a bet on the Russian Cup, where for the first time it reached the 1/16 finals and met with CSKA Moscow – at that time the vice-champion of Russia, the current winner of the Russian Cup and the UEFA Cup. To the disappointment of the Vladimir fans, in the next two seasons, Torpedo stopped a step away from repeating this success, losing in the 1/32 finals to Zenit-2 in 2006 and Baltika Kaliningrad in 2007. All these years, the Torpedo team showed consistently high results and in the championships. From October 2003 to July 2006, the Torpedo played 37 matches on its field and never left it defeated. Updated his personal record and Dmitry Vyazmikin, who scored 25 goals in the 2004 season.

Another record was set in the 2008 season by Torpedo goalkeeper Yevgeny Konyukhov, who conceded the first goal into his own net only in the 14th game of the championship. The "dry" series of the goalkeeper was 1224 minutes, and taking into account matches for the Russian Cup – 1404 minutes. Torpdeo, like three years earlier, reached the 1/16 finals of the National Cup and played with CSKA, conceding twice as many from the army team than in all previous games of the season – 1:4. Three days later, on 9 August, Torpedo suffered their first defeat in the championship, losing with a score of 0:1 to their main competitor for entering the first division, FC MVD Moscow. And all the same, the Vladimir players had very high chances of winning in the "West" zone – on 1 September, the gap between Torpedo and MVD was 12 points. However, the Muscovites, who had a series of 13 victories in a row, were able to get ahead of Vladimir at the finish of the championship.

In 2009, the Torpdeo again missed the chance to take first place in the western zone of the second division. At the finish of the championship, Torpedo came close to FC Dynamo St. Petersburg in the standings, but after losing on 19 October in a face-to-face home meeting, they could not take the lead. This season, the Vladimir players played two matches with Premier League clubs: in the 1/16 finals of the Russian Cup with FC Zenit (0:2) and in a friendly game with FC Spartak Moscow (0:3). In 2010, Torpedo won the tournament in the West zone of the Second Division and earned the right to participate in the First Division.

During the first 11 rounds of the 2011/12 season, five coaches of Torpedo rivals were dismissed in direct or indirect connection with the games with the club from Vladimir. In this regard, Evgeny Durnev was called "the executioner of the FNL coaching workshop". In July 2011, Torpedo, having beaten Spartak-Nalchik, reached the 1/8 finals of the Russian Cup, where they lost to Terek Grozny. Torpedo finished the first round of the FNL championship in 10th place, but after the 32nd round, having a series of seven matches without victories in the liabilities, the club fell into the "relegation zone". On 18 October 2011, Evgeny Durnev submitted his resignation, and his assistant Alexander Akimov was appointed acting head coach. After the final match of the first stage, in which Torpedo defeated Torpedo Moscow, Akimov was approved as head coach. At the second stage of the FNL championship, they significantly improved their standings and, after defeating Baltika in the penultimate round, secured a place in the FNL for the next year.

On 5 July 2012, the Torpedo management announced that there were no financial opportunities to participate in the FNL-2012/13 and that the club was deprived of its professional status. In 2012, Torpedo played in the Golden Ring zone of the Russian Championship among amateur clubs. In May 2013, Torpedo passed the certification in the PFL and received the right to play in the Second Division in the 2013/14 season.

== Current squad ==
As of 11 September 2026, according to the official Second League website.

Note: Flags indicate national team as defined under FIFA eligibility rules; some limited exceptions apply. Players may hold more than one non-FIFA nationality.

No.	Pos.	Nation	Player
3	DF	RUS	Nikita Romanenkov
6	MF	RUS	Alimkhan Alimkhanov
7	MF	RUS	Aleksandr Korenblyum
8	DF	RUS	Kirill Dvornikov
9	FW	RUS	Ramazan Isayev
10	MF	RUS	Sergey Chernenko
11	MF	RUS	Ivan Sergiyenko
17	DF	RUS	Danil Glinsky
20	MF	RUS	Vladislav Kostryukov
21	MF	RUS	Nikita Kolganov
22	FW	RUS	Konstantin Kuzmichyov
24	MF	RUS	Konstantin Popov
26	FW	RUS	Viktor Kuznetsov

No.	Pos.	Nation	Player
33	GK	RUS	Matvey Tesenkov
37	MF	RUS	Vladislav Sirotov
41	DF	RUS	Artyom Dudarev
49	MF	RUS	Konstantin Simakov
67	MF	RUS	Ivan Dubrovin
70	MF	RUS	Stepan Silantyev
71	GK	RUS	Maksim Vafiyev
72	DF	RUS	Dmitry Safronov
77	MF	RUS	Danil Sobolev
82	FW	RUS	Valery Arkhipenko
89	GK	RUS	Danil Shashlov (on loan from Alania Vladikavkaz)
91	DF	RUS	Stepan Komar

== Notable past players ==
- (Soviet Union) Valentin Afonin
- (Soviet Union) Viktor Losev
- (Soviet Union) Vladimir Suchilin
- (Russia) Maksim Belyayev
- (Russia) Nikita Krivtsov
- (Russia) Ishref Magomedov
- (Russia) Dmitri Zinovich
- (Russia) Dmitri Vyazmikin
