= FC Bataysk-2007 =

- Full name: Football Club Bataysk-2007
- Founded: 1998
- Dissolved: 2010
- Ground: Lokomotiv Stadium
- Capacity: 3,000
- League: Russian Second Division; Zone South
- 2009: 8th
Home colours	Away colours

FC Bataysk-2007 (Russian: ФК Батайск-2007) was a Russian association football club from Bataysk, founded in 1998 and playing on the professional level since 2007 until 2010. On July 31, 2010, it dropped out from the Russian Second Division due to lack of finances. From 1998 to 2006, it was called FC Bataysk.
