= Andrei Meshcheryakov (footballer) =

Russian footballer

Personal information
- Full name: Andrei Vladimirovich Meshcheryakov
- Date of birth: 8 February 1984 (age 42)
- Place of birth: Krasny Sulin, Rostov Oblast, Russian SFSR
- Height: 1.78 m (5 ft 10 in)
- Position: Forward

Senior career*
Years	Team	Apps	(Gls)
2001–2002	FC Zenit St. Petersburg	0	(0)
2002–2003	FC Zenit-2 St. Petersburg	42	(6)
2004–2005	FC Fakel Voronezh	27	(1)
2006	FC Spartak Lukhovitsy	27	(4)
2007	FC Trud Voronezh		
2008–2009	FC Lokomotiv Liski	57	(12)
- * Club domestic league appearances and goals

Andrei Vladimirovich Meshcheryakov (Russian: Андрей Владимирович Мещеряков; born 8 February 1984) is a former Russian professional football player.

== Club career ==
He played in the Russian Football National League for FC Fakel Voronezh in 2005.
