= FC Istra =

Russian football club

- Full name: Football Club Istra
- Founded: 1997
- Ground: Polevo
- Capacity: 1,500
- Chairman: Mikhail Smirnov
- Manager: Vladimir Antipov
- League: Amateur Football League, Zone Moscow Oblast
Home colours	Away colours

FC Istra (Russian: ФК "Истра") is an association football club from Istra, Russia, founded in 1997. It played in the Russian Second Division from 2008 to 2012, at which point it lost the financing and dropped back to the amateur levels. The most successful moment of the club is 2011-12 Russian Cup. Istra reached Round of 32, in which they lost to Russian Premier League giants Spartak Moscow 0–1.
