= FC SOYUZ-Gazprom Izhevsk =

Former Russian football team

- Full name: Football Club SOYUZ-Gazprom Izhevsk
- Founded: 1988; 37 years ago
- Dissolved: 2011; 14 years ago
- Ground: Central Stadium
- Chairman: Vladimir Tumayev
- League: inactive
- 2010: Russian Second Division, Zone Ural-Povolzhye, 3rd
Home colours	Away colours

FC SOYUZ-Gazprom Izhevsk (Russian: ФК «СОЮЗ-Газпром» Ижевск) was a Russian association football club from Izhevsk, founded in 1988 and playing on the professional level since 1991. In 2010, it played in the Russian Second Division. It played in the Russian First Division in 1993 and from 1996 to 2004, taking 4th place in 1996. Before 2011 season SOYUZ-Gazprom was dissolved and a new team FC Zenit-Izhevsk Izhevsk started representing the city in the Russian Second Division.

== Team name history ==
- 1988–1993 FC Gazovik Izhevsk
- 1994–2005 FC Gazovik-Gazprom Izhevsk
- 2006–2010 FC SOYUZ-Gazprom Izhevsk
