= FC Mostovik-Primorye Ussuriysk =

- Full name: Football Club Mostovik-Primorye Ussuriysk
- Founded: 1992
- Dissolved: 2012
- Ground: Commerce City Stadium
- Capacity: 2,500
- League: Russian Second Division, East zone
- 2011–12: 2nd

FC Mostovik-Primorye Ussuriysk (Russian: «Мостовик‑Приморье» (Уссурийск)) is an association football team from Ussuriysk, Russia. It played professionally for a single season in 1993, taking 11th place in Zone 7 of the Russian Second Division. In 2010, the club returned to the Russian Second Division. It was liquidated after the 2011–12 season due to lack of financing.

== Team name history ==
- 1992–2007: FC Lokomotiv Ussuriysk
- 2008: FC Mostovik-Lokomotiv Ussuriysk
- 2009–present: FC Mostovik-Primorye Ussuriysk
