= FC Cherepovets =

Russian football club

- Full name: Football Club; Cherepovets
- Founded: 1912 as Metallurg
- Ground: Metallurg Stadium
- Capacity: 11,500
- Chairman: Vladimir Golev
- Manager: Vladislav Galkin
- League: Russian Second League, Division B, Group 2
- 2026: 9th
- Website: fc-cherepovets.ru
Home colours	Away colours

Old Club logo

FC Cherepovets (Russian: Футбольный Клуб Череповец) is an association football club from Cherepovets, Russia. It completes in the Russian Second League Division B since 2025.

Before 2025, Cherepovets club last competed professionally in the Russian Second Division, West Zone in the 2011–12 season as FC Sheksna, dropping to amateur levels after that. The club changed its name from SeverStal Cherepovets in 2004. In 2012 it was reorganized as FC Cherepovets.

== Club names ==
- Metallurg (1956–1970)
- Stroitel (1979–1985)
- Khimik (1989–1990)
- Bulat (1991–1996)
- Severstal (2000–2004)
- Sheksna (2005–2012)
- Aist (2012–2013)
- Cherepovets – Aist (2013)
- Cherepovets (2014 – )

== Current squad ==
As of 11 September 2026, according to the Second League website.

Note: Flags indicate national team as defined under FIFA eligibility rules; some limited exceptions apply. Players may hold more than one non-FIFA nationality.

No.	Pos.	Nation	Player
1	GK	RUS	Andrey Pyrkin
2	DF	RUS	Mikhail Karamyshev
3	DF	RUS	Valeri Ganus
5	MF	RUS	Nikita Pichugin
7	MF	RUS	Miron Belyayev
8	MF	RUS	Oleg Krinkin
9	FW	RUS	Ilya Antsiferov
10	FW	RUS	Anton Balashov
11	FW	RUS	Kirill Kulkov
13	GK	RUS	Mikhail Zykov
14	MF	RUS	Denis Kovalevsky
15	DF	RUS	David Berezov
17	MF	RUS	Roni Mikhaylovsky

No.	Pos.	Nation	Player
18	DF	RUS	Vladimir Maklasov
20	MF	RUS	Danil Malyshev
21	DF	RUS	Dmitry Popov
22	DF	RUS	Roman Tkachyov
23	MF	RUS	Semyon Yurinsky
27	DF	RUS	Daniyal Gadzhiyev
30	MF	RUS	Aleksei Usanov
47	MF	RUS	Dmitry Serebryakov
51	DF	RUS	Zakhar Zykov
54	GK	RUS	Nikita Matyunin
77	MF	RUS	Elnur Khalygov
91	FW	RUS	Leon Ayba
