= 2005 FC Alania Vladikavkaz season =

Alania Vladikavkaz
2005 season
- Chairman: Sergei Takoyev
- Manager: Bakhva Tedeyev (until 16 April); Edgar Gess (18 April - 27 June); Itzhak Shum (28 June - 26 September); Aleksandr Yanovsky (caretaker) (from 27 September)
- Stadium: Republican Spartak Stadium
- Premier League: 15th
- 2004–05 Russian Cup: Round of 16 vs Khimki
- 2005–06 Russian Cup: Fifth round vs Lokomotiv Chita

The 2005 Alania Vladikavkaz season was the fifteenth season that the club played in the Russian Premier League, the highest tier of association football in Russia. They finished the season second bottom of the league, 15th, on 23 points and were relegated to the Russian First Division.

== Season review ==
In January, Alania signed Rakhmatullo Fuzaylov from Shinnik Yaroslavl, Spartak Gogniyev from Rotor Volgograd and the season-long loan signing, with option to buy, of Cristian Tudor from FC Moscow.

During their winter training camp in Turkey, Alania took Justice Christopher on trial. Also in February, Alania announced the signing of free-agent Isaac Okoronkwo and of Davit Kvirkvelia from Dinamo Tbilisi.

On 22 February, Alania announced the signing of Dzhambulad Bazayev to a three-year contract, whilst also announcing the signing of Jaba Kankava to a five-year contract and the loan singing, with a purchase option, of Alberto Blanco.

On the last day of the transfer window, 11 March, Alania announced the singing of Ibra Kébé from Spartak Moscow.

On 18 April, Edgar Gess was appointed as the Head Coach of Alania following the departure of Bakhva Tedeyev.

In July, Itzhak Shum was appointed as Head Coach after Edgar Gess left the club. Shum then left the club in September, being replaced by acting Head Coach Aleksandr Yanovsky.

In October, Chairman Sergei Takoyev stated that Ibra Kébé had been awol for the season and never turned up after the loan agreement with Spartak Moscow.

== Squad ==
As of match played 19 November 2005

No.	Name	Nationality	Position	Date of birth (age)	Signed from	Signed in	Contract ends	Apps.	Goals
Goalkeepers
1	Sergei Narubin	(Russia)	GK	5 December 1981 (aged 23)	Dynamo Bryansk	2005		1	0
22	Dejan Radić	(Serbia and Montenegro)	GK	8 July 1980 (aged 25)	Rad	2004		28	0
44	Mykola Tsyhan	(Ukraine)	GK	9 August 1984 (aged 21)	MFC Mykolaiv	2003			
Defenders
2	Artur Pagayev	(Russia)	DF	28 December 1971 (aged 33)	Trainee	1990			
3	Isaac Okoronkwo	(Nigeria)	DF	1 May 1978 (aged 27)	Unattached	2005		22	0
4	Rakhmatullo Fuzaylov	(Tajikistan)	DF	16 September 1978 (aged 27)	Shinnik Yaroslavl	2005			
5	Georgi Dzhioyev	(Russia)	DF	13 June 1986 (aged 19)	Trainee	2003			
7	Alan Agayev	(Russia)	DF	31 March 1977 (aged 28)	Iriston Vladikavkaz	1995			
13	Darius Žutautas	(Lithuania)	DF	30 September 1978 (aged 27)	FBK Kaunas	2005			
14	Leopoldo Jiménez	(Venezuela)	DF	22 May 1978 (aged 27)	Córdoba	2005		9	0
15	Justice Christopher	(Nigeria)	DF	24 December 1981 (aged 23)	Trelleborg	2005		8	0
21	Elvin Beqiri	(Albania)	DF	27 September 1980 (aged 25)	on loan from Metalurh Donetsk	2005	2005	7	0
24	Slavoljub Đorđević	(Serbia and Montenegro)	DF	15 February 1981 (aged 24)	Red Star Belgrade	2005		8	0
29	Azamat Zaseyev	(Russia)	DF	29 June 1988 (aged 17)	Trainee	2005		1	0
30	Thiago Maciel	(Brazil)	DF	7 August 1982 (aged 23)	on loan from Vasco da Gama	2005	2005	9	0
45	Boris Bagayev	(Russia)	DF	15 March 1985 (aged 20)	Trainee	2004			
60	Vladan Grujić	(Bosnia and Herzegovina)	DF	17 May 1981 (aged 24)	1. FC Köln	2005		26	0
Midfielders
10	Vitali Daraselia Jr.	(Georgia (country))	MF	27 September 1978 (aged 27)	Dinamo Tbilisi	2004			
16	Davit Kvirkvelia	(Georgia (country))	MF	27 June 1980 (aged 25)	Dinamo Tbilisi	2005		15	0
17	Georgi Bazayev	(Russia)	MF	26 August 1978 (aged 27)	Avtodor Vladikavkaz	2001			
18	Dzhambulad Bazayev	(Russia)	MF	18 August 1979 (aged 26)	Saturn Ramenskoye	2005	2007		
19	Robert Tedeyev	(Russia)	MF	23 January 1986 (aged 19)	Trainee	2004			
23	Jaba Kankava	(Georgia (country))	MF	18 March 1986 (aged 19)	Dinamo Tbilisi	2005	2009	18	0
27	Aziz Guliyev	(Russia)	MF	2 May 1987 (aged 18)	Trainee	2005			
43	Mirza Alborov	(Russia)	MF	17 December 1987 (aged 17)	Trainee	2004			
56	Giorgi Shashiashvili	(Georgia (country))	MF	1 September 1979 (aged 26)	Dinamo Tbilisi	2005		9	0
70	Idan Shum	(Israel)	MF	26 March 1976 (aged 29)	Hapoel Ironi Rishon LeZion	2005		0	0
88	Vladimir Burduli	(Georgia (country))	MF	26 October 1980 (aged 25)	Zimbru Chișinău	2005		17	0
90	Vladislav Lungu	(Moldova)	MF	10 April 1977 (aged 28)	Gorica	2005		2	0
Forwards
8	Cristian Tudor	(Romania)	FW	23 August 1982 (aged 23)	on loan from FC Moscow	2005	2005		
9	Artur Kusov	(Russia)	FW	3 May 1986 (aged 19)	Trainee	2004			
11	Sergiu Dadu	(Moldova)	FW	23 January 1981 (aged 24)	on loan from CSKA Moscow	2005	2005	30	6
36	Rolan Khugayev	(Russia)	FW	30 January 1985 (aged 20)	Trainee	2001			
49	Ruslan Alborov	(Russia)	FW	13 February 1983 (aged 22)	Trainee	2001			
53	Oleg Hromțov	(Moldova)	FW	30 May 1983 (aged 22)	Khimki	2005		0	0
54	Artur Nartikoyev	(Russia)	FW	14 April 1985 (aged 20)	Trainee	2005			
55	Ruslan Pimenov	(Russia)	FW	25 November 1981 (aged 23)	on loan from Lokomotiv Moscow	2005	2005	6	0
77	Spartak Gogniyev	(Russia)	FW	19 January 1981 (aged 24)	Rotor Volgograd	2005	2007	31	7
99	Giorgi Demetradze	(Georgia (country))	FW	26 September 1976 (aged 29)	on loan from Metalurh Donetsk	2005	2005		
Away on loan
6	Nerijus Barasa	(Lithuania)	DF	1 June 1978 (aged 27)	Lada-Tolyatti	2003			
14	Amzor Ailarov	(Russia)	FW	29 January 1982 (aged 23)	Avtodor Vladikavkaz	2001			
Players that left Alania Vladikavkaz during the season
20	Iulian Tameș	(Romania)	MF	6 December 1989 (aged 15)	on loan from Dinamo București	2005		4	0
26	Alan Dzutsev	(Ukraine)	GK	24 December 1988 (aged 16)	Academy	2005		0	0
28	Kazbek Khutiyev	(Russia)	DF	13 June 1988 (aged 17)	Trainee	2005		0	0
31	Soslan Albegov	(Russia)	FW	12 January 1988 (aged 17)	Trainee	2005			
32	Ruslan Valiyev	(Russia)	DF	29 January 1988 (aged 17)	Trainee	2005		0	0
34	Soslan Arshiyev	(Russia)	DF	26 August 1988 (aged 17)	Trainee	2005		0	0
47	Levan Gvazava	(Georgia (country))	MF	8 July 1980 (aged 25)	Zimbru Chișinău	2004			
50	Alberto Blanco	(Panama)	MF	8 January 1978 (aged 27)	on loan from Sheriff Tiraspol	2005	2005	3	1
99	Ibra Kébé	(Senegal)	DF	24 December 1978 (aged 26)	on loan from Spartak Moscow	2005	2005	0	0

== Transfers ==
=== In ===
Date	Position	Nationality	Name	From	Fee	Ref.
1 January 2005	GK	(Russia)	Sergei Narubin	Dynamo Bryansk	Undisclosed	
1 January 2005	DF	(Bosnia and Herzegovina)	Vladan Grujić	1. FC Köln	Undisclosed	
1 January 2005	DF	(Lithuania)	Darius Žutautas	Kaunas	Undisclosed	
1 January 2005	DF	(Nigeria)	Justice Christopher	Trelleborg	Undisclosed	
1 January 2005	DF	(Tajikistan)	Rakhmatullo Fuzaylov	Shinnik Yaroslavl	Undisclosed	
1 January 2005	MF	(Georgia (country))	Vladimir Burduli	Dinamo Tbilisi	Undisclosed	
1 January 2005	MF	(Georgia (country))	Giorgi Shashiashvili	Dinamo Tbilisi	Undisclosed	
1 January 2005	MF	(Israel)	Idan Shum	Hapoel Ironi Rishon LeZion	Undisclosed	
19 January 2005	FW	(Russia)	Spartak Gogniyev	Rotor Volgograd	Undisclosed	
14 February 2005	DF	(Nigeria)	Isaac Okoronkwo	Unattached	Free	
14 February 2005	MF	(Georgia (country))	Davit Kvirkvelia	Dinamo Tbilisi	Undisclosed	
21 February 2005	MF	(Georgia (country))	Jaba Kankava	Dinamo Tbilisi	Undisclosed	
21 February 2005	MF	(Russia)	Dzhambulad Bazayev	Saturn Ramenskoye	Undisclosed	
1 July 2005	DF	(Serbia and Montenegro)	Slavoljub Đorđević	Red Star Belgrade	Undisclosed	
1 July 2005	DF	(Venezuela)	Leopoldo Jiménez	Córdoba	Undisclosed	
1 July 2005	MF	(Moldova)	Vladislav Lungu	Gorica	Undisclosed	
1 July 2005	FW	(Moldova)	Oleg Hromțov	Khimki	Undisclosed	

=== Loans in ===
Date from	Position	Nationality	Name	From	Date to	Ref.
1 January 2005	MF	(Romania)	Iulian Tameș	Dinamo București	Undisclosed	
1 January 2005	FW	(Moldova)	Sergiu Dadu	CSKA Moscow	31 December 2005	
1 January 2005	FW	(Georgia (country))	Giorgi Demetradze	Metalurh Donetsk	31 December 2005	
19 January 2005	FW	(Romania)	Cristian Tudor	FC Moscow	31 December 2005	
21 February 2005	MF	(Panama)	Alberto Blanco	Sheriff Tiraspol	Undisclosed	
11 March 2005	DF	(Senegal)	Ibra Kébé	Spartak Moscow	31 December 2005	
1 July 2005	DF	(Brazil)	Thiago Maciel	Vasco da Gama	31 December 2005	
1 July 2005	FW	(Russia)	Ruslan Pimenov	Lokomotiv Moscow	31 December 2005	

=== Out ===
Date	Position	Nationality	Name	To	Fee	Ref.
23 January 2005	DF	(Czech Republic)	Erich Brabec	Kayserispor	Undisclosed	
23 January 2005	MF	(Russia)	Yuri Drozdov	Zhenis	Undisclosed	
1 July 2005	DF	(Serbia and Montenegro)	Ivan Vukomanović	Sporting Lokeren	Undisclosed	
1 July 2005	MF	(Panama)	Alberto Blanco	Al Ain	Undisclosed	
1 July 2005	MF	(Romania)	Iulian Tameș	Național București	Undisclosed	
1 July 2005	MF	(Russia)	Igor Yanovsky	Châteauroux	Undisclosed	
1 October 2005	MF	(Georgia (country))	Levan Gvazava	Dinamo Batumi	Undisclosed	

=== Loans out ===
Date from	Position	Nationality	Name	To	Date to	Ref.
1 July 2005	FW	(Russia)	Amzor Ailarov	SKA-Khabarovsk	31 December 2005	
1 August 2005	DF	(Lithuania)	Nerijus Barasa	Krylia Sovetov	31 December 2005	

=== Released ===
Date	Position	Nationality	Name	Joined	Date	Ref.
31 December 2004	GK	(Russia)	Dmitri Khomich	Spartak Moscow	7 January 2005	
31 December 2004	DF	(Belarus)	Ihar Tarlowski	Fakel Voronezh		

=== Trial ===
Date From	Position	Nationality	Name	Joined	Date To	Ref.
January 2004	GK	(Belarus)	Yury Tsyhalka	Dinamo Minsk		
	DF	(Nigeria)	Justice Christopher	Trelleborg	Undisclosed	
	DF	(Nigeria)	Isaac Okoronkwo	Wolverhampton Wanderers		
	MF	(Panama)	Alberto Blanco	Sheriff Tiraspol		

== Competitions ==
=== Overall record ===
Competition	First match	Last match	Starting round	Final position	Record							
Competition	First match	Last match	Starting round	Final position	Pld	W	D	L	GF	GA	GD	Win %
Premier League	12 March 2005	19 November 2005	Matchday 1	15th	30	5	8	17	27	53	−26	16.67
2004–05 Russian Cup	7 March 2005	16 March 2005	2004 Season	Last 16	2	0	1	1	1	3	−2	0.00
2005–06 Russian Cup	13 July 2005	21 September 2005	Fifth round	Fifth round	2	1	0	1	2	2	+0	50.00
Total					34	6	9	19	30	58	−28	17.65

Last updated: 19 November 2005
Source: Competitions

=== Premier League ===
==== Results by round ====
Round	1	2	3	4	5	6	7	8	9	10	11	12	13	14	15	16	17	18	19	20	21	22	23	24	25	26	27	28	29	30
Ground	A	H	A	H	A	H	A	H	A	H	A	A	H	A	H	H	A	H	A	H	A	H	A	H	A	H	H	A	H	A
Result	L	W	L	D	L	W	L	W	D	D	L	L	W	D	D	W	L	D	L	D	L	L	L	L	L	L	D	W	L	L

Updated to match(es) played on 19 November 2005. Source: See Results
A = Away; H = Home; W = Win; D = Draw; L = Loss

==== Results ====
12 March 2005 1	Krylia Sovetov	2 – 0	Alania Vladikavkaz	Samara
16:00 MSK (UTC+4)	Booth 31'; Poškus 47'; Karyaka (yellow card) 71'; Kingston (yellow card) 73'	Report	Tudor (yellow card) 57'	Stadium: Metallurg Stadium; Attendance: 27,000; Referee: Igor Zakharov

20 March 2005 2	Alania Vladikavkaz	0 – 3	Zenit St.Petersburg	Vladikavkaz
16:00 MSK (UTC+4)	Fuzailov (yellow card) 28'; Barasa (yellow card) 55' (yellow-red card) 73'; Bazayev (yellow card) 82'; Burduli (penalty missed) 90'	Report	Vještica 13'; Spivak 27' (pen.); Kerzhakov 64'; Radimov (penalty missed) 79'; Flachbart (yellow card) 83'	Stadium: Republican Spartak Stadium; Attendance: 11,000; Referee: Vladimir Pettay

2 April 2005 3	Torpedo Moscow	3 – 0	Alania Vladikavkaz	Moscow
17:00 MSK (UTC+4)	Kormiltsev 50'; Semshov 84'; Panov 90+'	Report	Kvirkvelia (yellow card) 65'	Stadium: Luzhniki Stadium; Attendance: 4,500; Referee: Alexander Gonchar

10 April 2005 4	Alania Vladikavkaz	1 – 1	Shinnik Yaroslavl	Vladikavkaz
17:00 MSK (UTC+4)	Grujić (yellow card) 25'; Dadu (yellow card) 41' (goal) 66'	Report	Pogrebnyak (yellow card) 49'; Bikey 65'	Stadium: Republican Spartak Stadium; Attendance: 12,000; Referee: Sergey Frantsuzov

16 April 2005 5	Saturn Ramenskoye	3 – 1	Alania Vladikavkaz	Ramenskoye
18:00 MSK (UTC+4)	Shirokov 11'; Géder 41'; Pavlovich 53'	Report	Daraselia Jr. (yellow card) 52'; Gogniyev 85'	Stadium: Saturn Stadium; Attendance: 7,500; Referee: Mikhail Veselovsky

23 April 2005 6	Alania Vladikavkaz	2 – 1	Spartak Moscow	Vladikavkaz
17:00 MSK (DST) (UTC+4)	D.Bazayev (yellow card) 3' (goal) 65'; Agayev (yellow card) 36'; Dadu 58' (yellow card) 59'; Žutautas (yellow card) 80'	Report	Vidić (yellow card) 8'; Pavlyuchenko 51'	Stadium: Republican Stadium; Attendance: 21,000; Referee: Alexey Tyumin

30 April 2005 7	FC Moscow	1 – 0	Alania Vladikavkaz	Moscow
18:00 MSK (DST) (UTC+4)	Bracamonte 11'; Fredericks (yellow card) 43'; Tchuissé (yellow card) 49'; Kuzmin (yellow card) 90+'	Report	Agayev (yellow card) 18'; Dadu (yellow card) 33'; Žutautas (yellow card) 57'; Barasa (red card) 89'	Stadium: Eduard Streltsov Stadium; Attendance: 3,000; Referee: Stanislav Sukhina

15 May 2005 8	Alania Vladikavkaz	4 – 3	Rubin Kazan	Vladikavkaz
16:00 MSK (DST) (UTC+4)	Burduli (yellow card) 26'; D.Bazayev 55', 69', 74'; Grujić (yellow card) 56'; Daraselia Jr. (yellow card) 63'; Tudor (yellow card) 63' (goal) 85'; G.Bazayev 74'; Žutautas (yellow card) 80'; Gogniyev (yellow card) 82'	Report	Ralph 10'; Rôni (yellow card) 26' (goal) 67'; Scotti 45+'	Stadium: Republican Spartak Stadium; Attendance: 19,000; Referee: Igor Zakharov

22 May 2005 9	Amkar Perm	0 – 0	Alania Vladikavkaz	Perm
17:00 MSK (DST) (UTC+4)	Popov (yellow card) 35'; Pyatibratov (yellow card) 50'; Lavrik (yellow card) 62'	Report	Agayev (yellow card) 83'	Stadium: Zvezda Stadium; Attendance: 18,500; Referee: Mikhail Khodyrev

28 May 2005 10	Alania Vladikavkaz	0 – 0	Rostov	Vladikavkaz
16:00 MSK (DST) (UTC+4)	Dadu (yellow card) 26'	Report	Bochkov (yellow card) 75'; Hendricks (yellow card) 77'; Burchenko (yellow card) 87'	Stadium: Republican Spartak Stadium; Attendance: 20,000; Referee: Sergey Martynov

12 June 2005 11	Dynamo Moscow	1 – 0	Alania Vladikavkaz	Moscow
17:00 MSK (DST) (UTC+4)	Derlei 29' (penalty missed) 39'; Batak (yellow card) 73'; Hanek (yellow card) 83'	Report	Grujić (yellow card) 8'; Fuzaylov (yellow card) 17'	Stadium: Dynamo Stadium; Attendance: 5,500; Referee: Sergey Lapochkin

18 June 2005 12	Lokomotiv Moscow	3 – 0	Alania Vladikavkaz	Moscow
18:00 MSK (DST) (UTC+4)	Loskov (yellow card) 22'; Bilyaletdinov 38'; Lebedenko 53'; Sychev 88'; Amelyanchuk (yellow card) 90+'	Report	Kankava (yellow card) 16'; Fuzaylov (yellow card) 75'	Stadium: Lokomotiv Stadium; Attendance: 9,125; Referee: Nikolai Ivanov

25 June 2005 13	Alania Vladikavkaz	1 – 0	Terek Grozny	Vladikavkaz
15:00 MSK (DST) (UTC+4)	Grujić (yellow card) 29'; Bazayev 55'	Report		Stadium: Republican Spartak Stadium; Attendance: 12,000; Referee: Aleksei Nikolaev

2 July 2005 14	Tom Tomsk	0 – 0	Alania Vladikavkaz	Tomsk
16:00 MSK (UTC+3)	Skrylnikov (yellow card) 36'; Medvedev (penalty missed) 41'; Borzenkov (yellow card) 44'; Șișchin (yellow card) 57'	Report	Daraselia Jr. (yellow card) 30'; Tudor (yellow card) 81'	Stadium: Trud Stadium; Attendance: 11,500; Referee: Igor Zakharov

9 July 2005 15	Alania Vladikavkaz	1 – 1	CSKA Moscow	Vladikavkaz
18:00 MSK (DST) (UTC+4)	Grujić (yellow card) 5'; Christopher (yellow card) 42'; Daraselia Jr. 52'; Burduli (yellow card) 72'; Tudor (yellow card) 80' (red card) 85'	Report	Dudu (yellow card) 27'; Vágner Love 56'; Ignashevich (yellow card) 86'	Stadium: Republican Spartak Stadium; Attendance: 25,000; Referee: Alexey Tyumin

17 July 2005 16	Alania Vladikavkaz	2 – 0	Krylia Sovetov	Vladikavkaz
18:00 MSK (UTC+4)	D.Bazayev 45'; Dadu 79'; Burduli (yellow card) 87'	Report	Husin (yellow card) 85'	Stadium: Republican Spartak Stadium; Attendance: 20,000; Referee: Yuri Klyuchnikov

23 July 2005 17	Zenit St.Petersburg	3 – 1	Alania Vladikavkaz	Saint Petersburg
20:00 MSK (UTC+4)	Križanac 27' (yellow card) 44'; Poškus 36'; Spivak 75'; Škrtel (yellow card) 83'	Report	Dadu (yellow card) 61'; Bazayev (yellow card) 80'; Tudor 87'	Stadium: Petrovsky Stadium; Attendance: 21,000; Referee: Yuri Baskakov

31 July 2005 18	Alania Vladikavkaz	2 – 2	Torpedo Moscow	Vladikavkaz
18:00 MSK (UTC+4)	Demetradze 5', 11' (yellow card) 89'; Grujić (yellow card) 45+'; Daraselia Jr. (yellow card) 45+' (yellow-red card) 62'; D.Bazayev (yellow card) 55'; Agayev (yellow card) 80'	Report	Panov (yellow card) 17' (goal) 90+'; Laizāns (yellow card) 51' (goal) 54'; Mamayev (yellow card) 86'	Stadium: Republican Spartak Stadium; Attendance: 27,000; Referee: Stanislav Sukhina

6 August 2005 19	Shinnik Yaroslavl	1 – 0	Alania Vladikavkaz	Vladikavkaz
18:00 MSK (UTC+4)	Branco (yellow card) 10'; Pogrebnyak 25'; Łągiewka (yellow card) 42'; Kornaukhov (yellow card) 45'; Budiša (yellow card) 63'	Report	Žutautas (yellow card) 56'; Dadu (yellow card) 76'	Stadium: Republican Spartak Stadium; Attendance: 7,000; Referee: Alexey Sergeev

21 August 2005 20	Alania Vladikavkaz	1 – 1	Saturn Ramenskoye	Vladikavkaz
18:00 MSK (UTC+4)	Grujić (yellow card) 45+'; Okoronkwo (yellow card) 48'; Dadu 89'	Report	Jolović (yellow card) 10'; Bareiro 27'	Stadium: Republican Spartak Stadium; Attendance: 20,000; Referee: Aleksei Nikolaev

27 August 2005 21	Spartak Moscow	5 – 1	Alania Vladikavkaz	Moscow
14:00 MSK (DST) (UTC+4)	Kováč 12', 51'; Covalciuc 20'; Bystrov 44'; Kowalewski (yellow card) 57'; Vidić (yellow card) 57'; Pavlyuchenko (yellow card) 66'; Cavenaghi 72'	Report	Kvirkvelia (yellow card) 4' (yellow-red card) 25'; D.Bazayev 54' (pen.) (yellow card) 57'; Bazayev (yellow card) 57'; Đorđević (yellow card) 65'	Stadium: Dynamo Stadium; Attendance: 10,000; Referee: Igor Egorov

10 September 2005 22	Alania Vladikavkaz	0 – 2	FC Moscow	Vladikavkaz
18:00 MSK (DST) (UTC+4)	Đorđević (yellow card) 38'; Dadu (yellow card) 61'	Report	Melyoshin 32' (yellow card) 45'; Godunok 60'; Jop (yellow card) 61'; Gorawski (yellow card) 90+'	Stadium: Republican Spartak Stadium; Attendance: 20,000; Referee: Vladimir Pettay

17 September 2005 23	Rubin Kazan	4 – 2	Alania Vladikavkaz	Kazan
16:00 MSK (DST) (UTC+4)	Scotti 6' (pen.); Vasilyev (yellow card) 44'; Domínguez 68'; Bukharov (yellow card) 78'; Čížek 83'; Calisto 88'; Fyodorov (yellow card) 90+'	Report	D.Bazayev 54', 81' (pen.) (yellow card) 90+'; Jiménez (yellow card) 62'	Stadium: Central Stadium; Attendance: 7,000; Referee: Mikhail Khodyrev

25 September 2005 24	Alania Vladikavkaz	0 – 1	Amkar Perm	Vladikavkaz
17:00 MSK (DST) (UTC+4)	Agayev (yellow card) 45+'; Jiménez (yellow card) 50'; D.Bazayev (yellow card) 81'	Report	Cherenchikov (yellow card) 55'; Yordanov (yellow card) 70'; Volkov 86'	Stadium: Republican Spartak Stadium; Attendance: 15,500; Referee: Aleksandr Kolobaev

2 October 2005 25	Rostov	1 – 0	Alania Vladikavkaz	Rostov-on-Don
17:00 MSK (DST) (UTC+4)	Bochkov 16' (yellow card) 85'; Kalashnikov (yellow card) 70'; Dantsev (yellow card) 79'	Report	Okoronkwo (yellow card) 67'; Grujić (yellow card) 72'	Stadium: Olimp-2; Attendance: 9,500; Referee: Valentin Ivanov

16 October 2004 26	Alania Vladikavkaz	2 – 4	Dynamo Moscow	Vladikavkaz
17:00 MSK (DST) (UTC+4)	D.Bazayev (penalty missed) 2'; Đorđević (yellow card) 47' (yellow-red card) 67'; Jiménez (yellow card) 54'; Beqiri (yellow card) 60'; Gogniyev 73'; Dadu (yellow card) 81' (goal) 87' (pen.)	Report	Tochilin (yellow card) 2' (yellow-red card) 45' (goal) 16'; Kolodin (yellow card) 3'; Derlei (yellow card) 30' (goal) 34'; Polovinchuk (yellow card) 38'; Ribeiro 49'; Maniche 84'; Nuno (yellow card) 90'	Stadium: Republican Spartak Stadium; Attendance: 12,000; Referee: Aleksandr Gvardis

23 October 2005 27	Alania Vladikavkaz	0 – 0	Lokomotiv Moscow	Vladikavkaz
16:00 MSK (DST) (UTC+4)	Dadu (yellow card) 22'	Report	Bilyaletdinov (yellow card) 55'; Asatiani (yellow card) 79'; Ruopolo (yellow card) 89'	Stadium: Republican Spartak Stadium; Attendance: 15,000; Referee: Sergey Fursa

30 October 2005 28	Terek Grozny	1 – 2	Alania Vladikavkaz	Pyatigorsk
17:00 MSK (UTC+3)	Adamov (yellow card) 44'; Mazayev 77'	Report	Bazayev 20'; Beqiri (yellow card) 41'; Gogniyev 66'; Grujić (yellow card) 84'	Stadium: Central Stadium; Attendance: 2,000; Referee: Valentin Ivanov

6 November 2005 29	Alania Vladikavkaz	1 – 2	Tom Tomsk	Vladikavkaz
14:00 MSK (UTC+3)	Dadu 24' (pen.); Gogniyev (yellow card) 27'; Beqiri (yellow card) 31'	Report	Borzenkov (yellow card) 51'; Krunić 54' (pen.); Yanotovsky (yellow card) 79'; Medvedev 87'	Stadium: Republican Spartak Stadium; Attendance: 10,000; Referee: Aleksandr Kolobaev

19 November 2005 30	CSKA Moscow	4 – 3	Alania Vladikavkaz	Moscow
14:00 MSK (UTC+3)	Ignashevich 24'; Salugin 36'; Vágner Love 66', 77'	Report	Gogniyev 38', 81', 87'; Lungu (yellow card) 71'	Stadium: Dynamo Stadium; Attendance: 10,000; Referee: Sergei Fursa

==== League table ====
Pos	Team	Pld	W	D	L	GF	GA	GD	Pts	Qualification or relegation
12	Amkar Perm	30	7	12	11	25	36	−11	33	
13	Rostov	30	8	7	15	26	41	−15	31	
14	Krylia Sovetov Samara	30	7	8	15	29	44	−15	29	
15	Alania Vladikavkaz (R)	30	5	8	17	27	53	−26	23	Relegation to First Division
16	Terek Grozny (Note: Terek had 6 points deducted for failing to pay transfer fee in time.) (R)	30	5	5	20	20	50	−30	14	Relegation to First Division

Source: RFPL
Rules for classification: 1st points; 2nd matches won; 3rd goal difference; 4th head-to-head (points, matches won, goal difference, goals scored, away goals scored)
(R) Relegated

=== Russian Cup ===
==== 2004–05 ====
7 March 2005 Last 16 1st leg	Alania Vladikavkaz	0 – 2	Khimki	Vladikavkaz
MSK (UTC+3)	Bagayev (yellow card) 64'	Report	Tikhonov) 20'; Ivanov (yellow card) 25'; Ivanov 36'	Stadium: Republican Spartak Stadium; Attendance: 10,000; Referee: Mikhail Veselovsky

16 March 2005 Last 16 2nd leg	Khimki	1 – 1 (3 – 1 agg.)	Alania Vladikavkaz	Moscow
14:00 MSK (UTC+3)	Tikhonov 79' (pen.); Kalachyov (yellow card) 85'; Grishin (yellow card) 86'	Report	Dadu (yellow card) 29'; Blanco 53'	Stadium: Dynamo Stadium; Attendance: 1,200; Referee: Sergey Frantsuzov

==== 2005–06 ====
13 July 2005 Fifth round 1st leg	Alania Vladikavkaz	2 – 0	Lokomotiv Chita	Vladikavkaz
18:00 MSK (UTC+3)	Pagayev (yellow card) 9'; Gogniyev 10'; Daraselia Jr. 90'	Report	Plyaskin (yellow card) 16'; Gavryush (yellow card) 52'	Stadium: Republican Spartak Stadium; Attendance: 10,000; Referee: Alexander Evstigneev

21 September 2005 Fifth round 2nd leg	Lokomotiv Chita	2 – 0 (2 – 2 agg.) (5 – 4 p)	Alania Vladikavkaz	Chita
12:00 MSK (UTC+3)	Alkhimov 64' (pen.); Nagibin 71'; Deryabkin (yellow card) 85'; Belichenko (yellow card) 90'	Report	Dzhioyev (yellow card) 64'; Kankava (yellow card) 75'	Stadium: Lokomotiv Stadium; Attendance: 5,800; Referee: Stanislav Sukhina
	Penalties
	Alkhimov (penalty scored); Kotovets (penalty scored); Bodyalov (penalty scored); Kreisman (penalty scored); Shvetsov (penalty scored)		(penalty scored) Gvazava; (penalty scored) Kusov; (penalty scored) Kankava; (penalty scored) Beqiri; (penalty missed) M.Alborov

== Squad statistics ==
As of match played 19 November 2005

=== Appearances and goals ===
No.	Pos	Nat	Player	Total		Premier League		2004–05 Russian Cup		2005–06 Russian Cup	
No.	Pos	Nat	Player	Apps	Goals	Apps	Goals	Apps	Goals	Apps	Goals
1	GK	(Russia) RUS	Sergei Narubin	1	0	0	0	0	0	0+1	0
2	DF	(Russia) RUS	Artur Pagayev	5	0	3	0	1	0	1	0
3	DF	(Nigeria) NGA	Isaac Okoronkwo	22	0	20	0	1	0	1	0
4	DF	(Tajikistan) TJK	Rakhmatullo Fuzaylov	15	0	12	0	1	0	1+1	0
5	DF	(Russia) RUS	Georgi Dzhioyev	1	0	0	0	0	0	1	0
7	DF	(Russia) RUS	Alan Agayev	28	0	26	0	2	0	0	0
8	FW	(Romania) ROU	Cristian Tudor	16	2	15	2	1	0	0	0
9	FW	(Russia) RUS	Artur Kusov	4	0	3	0	0	0	1	0
10	MF	(Georgia (country)) GEO	Vitali Daraselia Jr.	22	2	19	1	0+2	0	0+1	1
11	FW	(Moldova) MDA	Sergiu Dadu	30	6	27	6	2	0	1	0
13	DF	(Lithuania) LTU	Darius Žutautas	18	0	18	0	0	0	0	0
14	DF	(Venezuela) VEN	Leopoldo Jiménez	9	0	9	0	0	0	0	0
15	DF	(Nigeria) NGA	Justice Christopher	8	0	7	0	0	0	0+1	0
16	MF	(Georgia (country)) GEO	Davit Kvirkvelia	15	0	14	0	0	0	1	0
17	MF	(Russia) RUS	Georgi Bazayev	30	1	27	1	2	0	1	0
18	MF	(Russia) RUS	Dzhambulad Bazayev	31	9	28	9	0+2	0	1	0
21	DF	(Albania) ALB	Elvin Beqiri	7	0	6	0	0	0	1	0
22	GK	(Serbia and Montenegro) SCG	Dejan Radić	28	0	26	0	1	0	1	0
23	MF	(Georgia (country)) GEO	Jaba Kankava	18	0	14	0	1+1	0	2	0
24	DF	(Serbia and Montenegro) SCG	Slavoljub Đorđević	8	0	8	0	0	0	0	0
27	MF	(Russia) RUS	Aziz Guliyev	1	0	0	0	0	0	1	0
29	DF	(Russia) RUS	Azamat Zaseyev	1	0	0	0	0	0	1	0
30	DF	(Brazil) BRA	Thiago Maciel	9	0	9	0	0	0	0	0
43	MF	(Russia) RUS	Mirza Alborov	1	0	0	0	0	0	0+1	0
44	GK	(Ukraine) UKR	Mykola Tsyhan	8	0	6	0	1	0	1	0
45	DF	(Russia) RUS	Boris Bagayev	1	0	0	0	1	0	0	0
49	FW	(Russia) RUS	Ruslan Alborov	2	0	1	0	0	0	1	0
55	FW	(Russia) RUS	Ruslan Pimenov	6	0	6	0	0	0	0	0
56	MF	(Russia) RUS	Giorgi Shashiashvili	9	0	7	0	0	0	2	0
60	DF	(Bosnia and Herzegovina) BIH	Vladan Grujić	26	0	26	0	0	0	0	0
77	FW	(Russia) RUS	Spartak Gogniyev	31	7	28	6	2	0	1	1
88	MF	(Georgia (country)) GEO	Vladimir Burduli	17	0	14	0	2	0	0+1	0
90	MF	(Moldova) MDA	Vladislav Lungu	2	0	2	0	0	0	0	0
99	FW	(Georgia (country)) GEO	Giorgi Demetradze	11	1	11	1	0	0	0	0
Players away from the club on loan:
14	MF	(Russia) RUS	Amzor Ailarov	2	0	1	0	0+1	0	0	0
Players who appeared for Alania Vladikavkaz but left during the season:
6	DF	(Lithuania) LTU	Nerijus Barasa	12	0	9	0	2	0	1	0
20	MF	(Romania) ROU	Iulian Tameș	4	0	3	0	1	0	0	0
47	MF	(Georgia (country)) GEO	Levan Gvazava	8	0	6	0	0	0	2	0
50	MF	(Panama) PAN	Alberto Blanco	3	1	2	0	1	1	0	0

=== Goal scorers ===
Place	Position	Nation	Number	Name	Premier League	2004–05 Russian Cup	2005–06 Russian Cup	Total
1	MF	(Russia)	18	Dzhambulad Bazayev	9	0	0	9
2	FW	(Russia)	77	Spartak Gogniyev	6	0	1	7
3	FW	(Moldova)	11	Sergiu Dadu	6	0	0	6
4	FW	(Romania)	8	Cristian Tudor	2	0	0	2
4	FW	(Georgia (country))	99	Giorgi Demetradze	2	0	0	2
4	MF	(Georgia (country))	10	Vitali Daraselia Jr.	1	0	1	2
7	MF	(Russia)	17	Georgi Bazayev	1	0	0	1
7	MF	(Panama)	50	Alberto Blanco	0	1	0	1
Total					27	1	2	30

=== Clean sheets ===
Place	Position	Nation	Number	Name	Premier League	2004–05 Russian Cup	2005–06 Russian Cup	Total
1	GK	(Serbia and Montenegro)	22	Dejan Radić	3	0	1	4
Total					3	0	1	3

=== Disciplinary record ===
Number	Nation	Position	Name	Premier League		2004–05 Russian Cup		2005–06 Russian Cup		Total	
Number	Nation	Position	Name	Booked	Sent off (straight red)	Booked	Sent off (straight red)	Booked	Sent off (straight red)	Booked	Sent off (straight red)
2	(Russia)	DF	Artur Pagayev	0	0	0	0	1	0	1	0
3	(Nigeria)	DF	Isaac Okoronkwo	2	0	0	0	0	0	2	0
4	(Tajikistan)	DF	Rakhmatullo Fuzaylov	3	0	0	0	0	0	3	0
5	(Russia)	DF	Georgi Dzhioyev	0	0	0	0	1	0	1	0
7	(Russia)	DF	Alan Agayev	5	0	0	0	0	0	5	0
8	(Romania)	FW	Cristian Tudor	4	1	0	0	0	0	4	1
10	(Georgia (country))	MF	Vitali Daraselia Jr.	4	1	0	0	0	0	4	1
11	(Moldova)	FW	Sergiu Dadu	9	0	1	0	0	0	10	0
13	(Lithuania)	DF	Darius Žutautas	4	0	0	0	0	0	4	0
14	(Venezuela)	DF	Leopoldo Jiménez	3	0	0	0	0	0	3	0
15	(Nigeria)	DF	Justice Christopher	1	0	0	0	0	0	1	0
16	(Georgia (country))	MF	Davit Kvirkvelia	2	1	0	0	0	0	2	1
17	(Russia)	MF	Georgi Bazayev	2	0	0	0	0	0	2	0
18	(Russia)	MF	Dzhambulad Bazayev	6	0	0	0	0	0	6	0
21	(Albania)	DF	Elvin Beqiri	3	0	0	0	0	0	3	0
23	(Georgia (country))	MF	Jaba Kankava	1	0	0	0	1	0	2	0
24	(Serbia and Montenegro)	DF	Slavoljub Đorđević	3	1	0	0	0	0	3	1
45	(Russia)	DF	Boris Bagayev	0	0	1	0	0	0	1	0
60	(Bosnia and Herzegovina)	DF	Vladan Grujić	9	0	0	0	0	0	9	0
77	(Russia)	FW	Spartak Gogniyev	2	0	0	0	0	0	2	0
88	(Georgia (country))	MF	Vladimir Burduli	3	0	0	0	0	0	3	0
90	(Moldova)	MF	Vladislav Lungu	1	0	0	0	0	0	1	0
99	(Georgia (country))	FW	Giorgi Demetradze	1	0	0	0	0	0	1	0
Players away on loan:
Players who left Alania Vladikavkaz during the season:
6	(Lithuania)	DF	Nerijus Barasa	1	2	0	0	0	0	1	2
Total				69	6	2	0	3	0	74	6
