= 2006 in Russian football =

2006 season

2006 in Russian football refers to the events of all Russian teams in association football in the year 2006. It was marked by CSKA Moscow's victory in the Russian Premier League. Russia found only limited success in international competition that year.

== National team ==
Russia played two friendly matches under the caretaker coach Aleksandr Borodyuk. On 1 March, they lost 0–1 to Brazil in Moscow, and on 27 May drew 0–0 with Spain in Albacete.

On 10 April Guus Hiddink announced that he will become manager of Russia team after 2006 FIFA World Cup. The contract was signed on 14 April.

Date	Venue	Opponents	Score^{1}	Competition	Russia scorers	Match Report
1 March 2006	Lokomotiv Stadium, Moscow (H)	Brazil	0–1	F		uefa
27 May 2006	Estadio Carlos Belmonte, Albacete (A)	Spain	0–0	F		uefa
16 August 2006	Lokomotiv Stadium, Moscow (H)	Latvia	1–0	F	Pavel Pogrebnyak	uefa FIFA
6 September 2006	Lokomotiv Stadium, Moscow (H)	Croatia	0–0	ECQ		uefa
7 October 2006	Dynamo Stadium, Moscow (H)	Israel	1–1	ECQ	Andrei Arshavin	uefa
11 October 2006	Petrovsky Stadium, Saint Petersburg (H)	Estonia	2–0	ECQ	Pavel Pogrebnyak, Dmitri Sychev	uefa
15 November 2006	City Stadium, Skopje (A)	North Macedonia	2–0	ECQ	Vladimir Bystrov, Andrei Arshavin	uefa

1. Russia score given first

Key

- H = Home match
- A = Away match
- F = Friendly
- ECQ = 2008 European Football Championship Qualifying, Group E

=== U-21 team ===
The under-21 team played in the qualification for the 2007 European Championship. Russia finished first in the group with Hungary and Finland, winning both matches, and qualified for the play-off against Portugal. In the first play-off match in Moscow, Russia took a 4–1 lead, but Portugal overcome the deficit in the return leg, winning 3–0 and qualifying for the final tournament on away goals.

=== U-19 team ===
The under-19 team finished third in group 1 of the elite round of 2006 European Championship. Russia's opponents were Austria, Hungary, and Slovenia.

=== U-17 team ===
The under-17 team won the 2006 European Championship in Luxembourg. After finishing second in a group with Spain, Hungary, and Luxembourg, Russia overcame Germany in the semifinal (1–0) and Czech Republic in the final on 14 May (2–2, 5–3 on penalties). This was the first time Russia won the U-17 European Championship. In order to qualify for the final tournament, Russia finished ahead of Italy, England, and Bulgaria in group 7 of the elite round.

== Leagues ==
=== Premier League ===
CSKA Moscow won the 2006 title, Torpedo Moscow were relegated for the first time since 1938.

Pos	Team	Pld	W	D	L	GF	GA	GD	Pts	Qualification or relegation
1	CSKA Moscow (C)	30	17	7	6	47	28	+19	58	Qualification to Champions League group stage
2	Spartak Moscow	30	15	13	2	60	36	+24	58	Qualification to Champions League third qualifying round
3	Lokomotiv Moscow	30	15	8	7	47	34	+13	53	Qualification to UEFA Cup first round (Note: Qualified as the winner of 2006–07 Russian Cup.)
4	Zenit St. Petersburg	30	13	11	6	42	30	+12	50	Qualification to UEFA Cup second qualifying round
5	Rubin Kazan	30	14	7	9	45	35	+10	49	Qualification to Intertoto Cup second round
6	FC Moscow	30	10	13	7	41	37	+4	43	
7	Luch-Energiya Vladivostok	30	12	5	13	37	39	−2	41	
8	Tom Tomsk	30	11	8	11	35	33	+2	41	
9	Krylia Sovetov Samara	30	10	8	12	37	35	+2	38	
10	Spartak Nalchik	30	10	8	12	31	34	−3	38	
11	Saturn	30	7	16	7	29	24	+5	37	
12	Rostov	30	10	6	14	42	48	−6	36	
13	Amkar Perm	30	8	11	11	22	36	−14	35	
14	Dynamo Moscow	30	8	10	12	31	40	−9	34	
15	Torpedo Moscow (R)	30	3	13	14	22	40	−18	22	Relegation to First Division
16	Shinnik Yaroslavl (R)	30	1	8	21	17	56	−39	11	Relegation to First Division

Source: RFPL
Rules for classification: 1st points; 2nd matches won; 3rd goal difference; 4th head-to-head (points, matches won, goal difference, goals scored, away goals scored); 5th goals scored; 6th away goals scored; 7th drawing of lots
(C) Champions; (R) Relegated

=== First Division ===
On 14 February two First Division clubs, Alania Vladikavkaz and Lokomotiv Chita, were denied professional licences by Professional Football League and excluded from professional football. On 22 February PFL decided to replace Alania and Lokomotiv with Lada Togliatti and Mashuk-KMV Pyatigorsk, the runners-up in the Second Division. The Russian Football Union did not endorse the exclusion and on 28 February decided to keep Alania and Lokomotiv in the First Division, giving them another chance to fulfill the league requirements. Consequently, on 6 March PFL decided to extend the First Division from 22 to 24 clubs, including Alania, Lokomotiv, Lada, and Mashuk-KMV.

However, on 20 March the Russian Football Union finally decided to exclude Alania and Lokomotiv from the league. This decision was announced by the Professional Football League on 21 March, five days before the start of the First Division.

Pos	Team	Pld	W	D	L	GF	GA	GD	Pts	Promotion or relegation
1	Khimki (P)	42	30	9	3	83	30	+53	99	Promotion to Premier League
2	Kuban Krasnodar (P)	42	30	7	5	92	25	+67	97	Promotion to Premier League
3	Ural Sverdlovsk Oblast	42	27	9	6	67	23	+44	90	
4	KAMAZ Naberezhnye Chelny	42	22	11	9	54	26	+28	77	
5	SKA-Khabarovsk	42	21	8	13	67	40	+27	71	
6	Sodovik Sterlitamak	42	18	15	9	59	35	+24	69	
7	Sibir Novosibirsk	42	19	8	15	67	45	+22	65	
8	Terek Grozny	42	18	8	16	48	47	+1	62	
9	Dynamo Bryansk	42	17	10	15	42	38	+4	61	
10	Avangard Kursk	42	16	13	13	45	38	+7	61	
11	Volgar-Gazprom	42	17	9	16	45	47	−2	60	
12	Salyut-Energia Belgorod	42	15	11	16	46	58	−12	56	
13	Mashuk-KMV Pyatigorsk	42	16	7	19	41	56	−15	55	
14	Baltika Kaliningrad	42	14	13	15	41	56	−15	55	
15	Anzhi Makhachkala	42	15	8	19	57	66	−9	53	
16	Dynamo Makhachkala	42	13	12	17	56	54	+2	51	
17	Lada-Togliatti	42	13	6	23	38	63	−25	45	
18	Spartak Nizhny Novgorod (R)	42	10	13	19	46	60	−14	43	Relegation to Second Division
19	Fakel Voronezh (R)	42	10	12	20	27	54	−27	42	Relegation to Second Division
20	Oryol (Note: Oryol were docked 6 points for failing to pay a transfer fee.) (R)	42	8	11	23	35	72	−37	29	Relegation to Second Division
21	Metallurg Krasnoyarsk (R)	42	5	6	31	30	80	−50	21	Relegation to Second Division
22	Angusht Nazran (R)	42	3	4	35	32	105	−73	13	Relegation to Second Division

Source: PFL, RSSSF
(P) Promoted; (R) Relegated
Notes:

Yevgeny Alkhimov became the top scorer for the second time in a row, this time for Ural with 25 goals.

=== Second Division ===
The following clubs have earned promotion by winning tournaments in their respective Second Division zones:

- FC Tekstilshchik-Telekom Ivanovo (West)
- FC Spartak-MZK Ryazan (Centre)
- FC Spartak Vladikavkaz (South)
- FC Nosta Novotroitsk (Ural-Povolzhye)
- FC Zvezda Irkutsk (East)

== Russian Super Cup ==
CSKA Moscow, winners of both the league and the cup in 2005, met the league runners-up Spartak Moscow in a Super Cup match on 11 March. CSKA won the match 3–2.

== Russian Cup ==
The cup final between CSKA Moscow and Spartak Moscow was won 3–0 by CSKA. Jô scored twice and Vagner Love once. Report

== UEFA club competitions ==
=== UEFA Cup 2005/06 ===
Lokomotiv Moscow and FC Zenit Saint Petersburg continued their participation in the 2005–06 UEFA Cup. Lokomotiv were knocked out in the round of 32 by Sevilla, and Zenit recorded two victories over Rosenborg and a win and a draw against Marseille to reach the quarterfinals, where they lost on aggregate to Sevilla, too. Zenit's run in the UEFA cup became the best in club's history.

=== Intertoto Cup 2006 ===
FC Moskva participated in the UEFA Intertoto Cup 2006. After defeating Belarusian team MTZ-RIPO Minsk 3–0 on aggregate in the Second Round, Moskva were paired Hertha Berlin. First leg in Berlin finished 0-0, and Hertha won the second leg 2–0 to progress to the UEFA Cup.

=== UEFA Champions League 2006/07 ===
CSKA Moscow and Spartak Moscow qualified for the group stage of the 2006–07 UEFA Champions League. CSKA defeated MFK Ružomberok 5–0 on aggregate in the third qualifying round. Spartak's qualification was harder, as they passed FC Sheriff Tiraspol on away goals after two draws in the second qualifying round, and FC Slovan Liberec 2–1 on aggregate.

Arsenal F.C., Futebol Clube do Porto, and Hamburger SV will be CSKA's opponents in the group stage, while Spartak will contend against Sporting Clube de Portugal, F.C. Internazionale Milano, and FC Bayern Munich.

=== UEFA Cup 2006/07 ===
Lokomotiv Moscow and Rubin Kazan qualified for the first round of the 2006–07 UEFA Cup. Rubin participated in the second qualifying round, defeating BATE Borisov 5–0 on aggregate.

In the first round, Lokomotiv and Rubin played S.V. Zulte-Waregem and Parma F.C., respectively. Both Russian clubs were eliminated.

== Women's football ==
=== Domestic competitions ===
Rossiyanka Moscow Oblast won the league, with Spartak Moscow finishing second and Nadezhda Noginsk third. The Cup also went to Rossiyanka, while Spartak were runners-up again.

=== National team ===
Russia women's national football team participated in the qualification for the 2007 FIFA Women's World Cup. They finished second behind Germany, failing to qualify.

=== U-20 World Championship ===
In August–September Russia hosted the 2006 FIFA U-20 Women's World Championship, held in Moscow and Saint Petersburg. The Russia national team finished second in group A which also included Brazil, Australia, and New Zealand, and lost 4–0 to China in the quarterfinal. The tournament was won by Korea DPR national team who defeated China 5–0 in the final at the Lokomotiv Stadium on 3 September.

=== U-19 national team ===
Russia qualified for the final tournament of the 2006 UEFA Women's U-19 Championship by winning the group including Portugal, Finland, and Israel in April. In the finals, Russia finished second in group B (with France, Switzerland and the Netherlands) and lost to hosts Germany 4–0 in the semifinal.
