= 2004–05 Russian Cup =

Tournament details
- Country: Russia

Final positions
- Champions: CSKA Moscow
- Runners-up: FC Khimki

The 2004–05 Russian Cup was the 13th season of the Russian football knockout tournament since the dissolution of Soviet Union.

The tournament was won by CSKA Moscow who beat FC Khimki in the final with 1–0.

== Preliminary round ==
Team 1	Score	Team 2
23 March 2004
Kavkaztransgaz Izobilny	w/o	Zhemchuzhina Budyonnovsk
Druzhba Maykop	0–0 (a.e.t.) (6–5 p)	SKA Rostov-on-Don
18 April 2004
FC Lobnya-Alla	2–0	FC Obninsk
Almaz Moscow	1–0 (a.e.t.)	Volga Tver
19 April 2004
Uralets Nizhny Tagil	0–2	Tobol Kurgan
Lada-SOK Dimitrovgrad	3–4 (a.e.t.)	Rubin-2 Kazan
Dynamo Kirov	2–0	FC Izhevsk
24 April 2004
Baltika-Tarko Kaliningrad	0–1	Sportakademklub Moscow

== First round ==
Team 1	Score	Team 2
13 April 2004
Volgar-Gazprom Astrakhan	1–0 (a.e.t.)	Sudostroitel Astrakhan
Vityaz Krymsk	2–1	Slavyansk Slavyansk-na-Kubani
Tekstilshchik Kamyshin	0–3	Olimpia Volgograd
Rotor-2 Volgograd	1–4	Torpedo Volzhsky
FC Krasnodar-2000	1–0 (a.e.t.)	Druzhba Maykop
Dynamo Stavropol	0–2	Kavkaztransgaz Izobilny
Angusht Nazran	2–1 (a.e.t.)	Avtodor Vladikavkaz
29 April 2004
Smena Komsomolsk-na-Amure	1–1 (a.e.t.) (3–5 p)	Okean Nakhodka
Chkalovets-1936 Novosibirsk	1–1 (a.e.t.) (3–4 p)	Irtysh Omsk
30 April 2004
Tobol Kurgan	0–3	Ural Yekaterinburg
Rubin-2 Kazan	1–0	Lada-Tolyatti
Neftyanik Ufa	1–2	Sodovik Sterlitamak
Lukoil Chelyabinsk	1–0	Zenit Chelyabinsk
Gazovik Orenburg	1–1 (a.e.t.) (1–4 p)	Nosta Novotroitsk
Energetik Uren	1–0	Dynamo Kirov
Elektronika Nizhny Novgorod	2–0	Lokomotiv Nizhny Novgorod
Alnas Almetyevsk	0–1 (a.e.t.)	Volga Ulyanovsk
2 May 2004
Zenit-2 Saint Petersburg	w/o	Svetogorets Svetogorsk
Volochanin-Ratmir VV	2–0	Almaz Moscow
Vityaz Podolsk	2–0	Titan Moscow
Sportakademklub Moscow	1–0	Petrotrest Saint Petersburg
Spartak Tambov	1–0	Ryazan-Agrokomplekt
Spartak Shchyolkovo	0–1	FC Vidnoye
Spartak Kostroma	2–0	Tekstilshchik-Telekom Ivanovo
Saturn Yegoryevsk	0–1	Biokhimik-Mordovia Saransk
FC Pskov-2000	0–1	BSK Spirovo
Lokomotiv Kaluga	0–1	FC Lobnya-Alla
FC Yelets	2–1	Fakel Voronezh
Dynamo Vologda	3–1 (a.e.t.)	Severstal Cherepovets
Don Novomoskovsk	0–0 (a.e.t.) (8–7 p)	Spartak Lukhovitsy
Avangard Kursk	1–1 (a.e.t.) (5–4 p)	Salyut-Energiya Belgorod
Zenit Penza	3–0	Iskra Engels
Torpedo Vladimir	0–2	FC Reutov

== Second round ==
Team 1	Score	Team 2
23 May 2004
Kavkaztransgaz Izobilny	2–0	Mashuk-KMV Pyatigorsk
Vityaz Krymsk	1–2 (a.e.t.)	FC Krasnodar-2000
Torpedo Volzhsky	2–2 (a.e.t.) (3–4 p)	Olimpia Volgograd
Angusht Nazran	3–1	Volgar-Gazprom Astrakhan
Zvezda Irkutsk	2–1	Sibiryak Bratsk
Okean Nakhodka	0–0 (a.e.t.) (4–5 p)	Amur Blagoveshchensk
Metallurg Krasnoyarsk	3–1 (a.e.t.)	Shakhtyor Prokopyevsk
Irtysh Omsk	3–2 (a.e.t.)	Dynamo Barnaul
Volga Ulyanovsk	2–1	Rubin-2 Kazan
Ural Yekaterinburg	2–2 (a.e.t.) (2–4 p)	Lukoil Chelyabinsk
Sodovik Sterlitamak	2–0	Nosta Novotroitsk
Energetik Uren	5–2	Elektronika Nizhny Novgorod
Sportakademklub Moscow	1–0 (a.e.t.)	Zenit-2 Saint Petersburg
Spartak Tambov	4–3 (a.e.t.)	Zenit Penza
FC Lobnya-Alla	1–0 (a.e.t.)	Vityaz Podolsk
FC Vidnoye	2–1	FC Reutov
Dynamo Vologda	1–1 (a.e.t.) (3–4 p)	Spartak Kostroma
BSK Spirovo	1–0 (a.e.t.)	Volochanin-Ratmir VV
Biokhimik-Mordovia Saransk	3–2 (a.e.t.)	Don Novomoskovsk
Avangard Kursk	0–2	FC Yelets

== Third round ==
Team 1	Score	Team 2
5 June 2004
Olimpia Volgograd	4–0	Angusht Nazran
FC Krasnodar-2000	1–0	Kavkaztransgaz Izobilny
7 June 2004
Volga Ulyanovsk	1–0	Energetik Uren
Sodovik Sterlitamak	2–2 (a.e.t.) (5–4 p)	Lukoil Chelyabinsk
11 June 2004
Amur Blagoveshchensk	2–0	Zvezda Irkutsk
Irtysh Omsk	1–0	Metallurg Krasnoyarsk
13 June 2004
FC Yelets	4–1	Spartak Tambov
FC Vidnoye	0–1 (a.e.t.)	Spartak Kostroma
BSK Spirovo	1–0	Sportakademklub Moscow
Biokhimik-Mordovia Saransk	1–0	FC Lobnya-Alla

== Fourth round ==
Team 1	Score	Team 2
2 July 2004
Volga Ulyanovsk	0–3	KAMAZ Naberezhnye Chelny
Uralan Elista	1–2 (a.e.t.)	Dynamo Makhachkala
Tom Tomsk	4–1	Metallurg-Kusbass Novokuznetsk
Spartak Kostroma	1–2	Dynamo Bryansk
Sokol Saratov	2–0	Lisma-Mordovia Saransk
Sodovik Sterlitamak	4–1	Neftekhimik Nizhnekamsk
Olimpia Volgograd	3–1	Anzhi Makhachkala
Lokomotiv Chita	1–0	Luch-Energiya Vladivostok
FC Oryol	0–1	Metallurg Lipetsk
FC Krasnodar-2000	0–2	Terek Grozny
FC Khimki	5–1	Baltika Kaliningrad
Chernomorets Novorossiysk	3–0	Spartak Nalchik
BSK Spirovo	0–1	Arsenal Tula
Biokhimik-Mordovia Saransk	2–4 (a.e.t.)	FC Yelets
Amur Blagoveshchensk	0–1	SKA-Energiya Khabarovsk
Irtysh Omsk	2–0	Gazovik-Gazprom Izhevsk

== Round of 32 ==
Team 1	Agg.	Team 2	1st leg	2nd leg
Krylia Sovetov Samara	7–2	Olimpia Volgograd	3–1	4–1
Irtysh Omsk	1–9	Zenit Saint Petersburg	0–2	1–7
Chernomorets Novorossiysk	2–1	Lokomotiv Moscow	1–0	1–1
Tom Tomsk	2–4	Kuban Krasnodar	1–1	1–3
Spartak Moscow	1–3	Metallurg Lipetsk	0–2	1–1
Sodovik Sterlitamak	2–4	FC Rostov	1–2	1–2
SKA-Energiya Khabarovsk	3–4	Shinnik Yaroslavl	3–0	0–4
Saturn Ramenskoye	6–1	KAMAZ Naberezhnye Chelny	3–0	3–1
Rubin Kazan	1–4	FC Khimki	0–1	1–3
Lokomotiv Chita	1–5	Rotor Volgograd	1–0	0–5
Dynamo Moscow	5–0	Dynamo Makhachkala	2–0	3–0
Dynamo Bryansk	0–4	Torpedo Moscow	0–2	0–2
FC Yelets	1–8	FC Moscow	1–3	0–5
Terek Grozny	0–1	Amkar Perm	0–1	0–0
Sokol Saratov	2–3	CSKA Moscow	2–0	0–3 (Note: Sokol Saratov did not appear for the second leg against CSKA Moscow.)
Arsenal Tula	2–5	Alania Vladikavkaz	0–0	2–5

== Round of 16 ==
Team 1	Agg.	Team 2	1st leg	2nd leg
Shinnik Yaroslavl	– (Note: Rotor Volgograd and Chernomorets Novorossiysk were denied a professional licence, therefore the teams were eliminated, thus Shinnik Yaroslavl and Amkar Perm advances to the next round.)	Rotor Volgograd	–	–
Amkar Perm	–	Chernomorets Novorossiysk	–	–
FC Moscow	2–6	CSKA Moscow	1–3	1–3
Torpedo Moscow	4–1	Metallurg Lipetsk	3–0	1–1
Alania Vladikavkaz	1–3	FC Khimki	0–2	1–1
Zenit Saint Petersburg	1–0	Kuban Krasnodar	0–0	1–0
FC Rostov	1–2	Saturn Ramenskoye	1–2	0–0
Dynamo Moscow	1–2	Krylia Sovetov Samara	1–1	0–1

== Quarter-finals ==
Team 1	Agg.	Team 2	1st leg	2nd leg
Zenit Saint Petersburg	8–1	Shinnik Yaroslavl	4–0	4–1
FC Khimki	4–1	Torpedo Moscow	1–1	3–0
Amkar Perm	2–1	Krylia Sovetov Samara	1–0	1–1
CSKA Moscow	2–1	Saturn Ramenskoye	2–1	0–0

== Semi-finals ==
Team 1	Agg.	Team 2	1st leg	2nd leg
FC Khimki	2–0	Amkar Perm	2–0	0–0
Zenit Saint Petersburg	1–2	CSKA Moscow	1–0	0–2

== Final ==
29 May 2005
16:00 UTC+3

CSKA Moscow	1–0	Khimki
Zhirkov 68'	Report

Lokomotiv Stadium, Moscow
Attendance: 24,000
Referee: Almir Kayumov (Moscow)
