= Ricardo Baiano =

Footballer (born 1980)

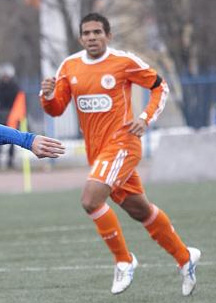

Personal information
- Full name: Ricardo Santos Lago
- Date of birth: 10 September 1980 (age 46)
- Place of birth: Ilhéus, Bahia, Brazil
- Height: 1.75 m (5 ft 9 in)
- Position: Midfielder

Team information
- Current team: Krasnodar (Youth Academy Manager)

Senior career*
Years	Team	Apps	(Gls)
2000	Londrina		
2001	Jaboticabal Atlético		
2002	São Paulo		
2003–2004	Široki Brijeg	26	(5)
2004–2007	Kuban Krasnodar	96	(21)
2008	Spartak Nalchik	6	(1)
2008	→ Moscow (loan)	8	(0)
2009	Krasnodar	20	(4)
2009	→ Spartak Nalchik (loan)	9	(1)
2010–2011	Zhemchuzhina-Sochi	41	(2)
2011	Khimki	7	(0)
2012	Široki Brijeg	16	(4)

International career
2004	Bosnia and Herzegovina	1	(0)

Managerial career
- 2013–: Krasnodar (youth academy manager)
- * Club domestic league appearances and goals

Ricardo Santos Lago (born 10 September 1980), best known as Ricardo Baiano, is a retired professional football midfielder who is currently the Youth Academy Manager of FC Krasnodar. Born in Brazil, he represented the Bosnia and Herzegovina national team.

== Club career ==
Ricardo Baiano began playing football with PSTC. He would eventually play in Bosnia and Herzegovina and Russia.

== International career ==
Born in Brazil, Baiano played once for the Bosnia and Herzegovina national team, coming on as a second-half substitute for Elvir Baljić in a World Cup qualification game against Serbia and Montenegro on 9 October 2004.

== Managerial and coaching career ==
In May 2013, Baiano was appointed as Youth Academy Manager of his former club FC Krasnodar.

== Personal life ==
Ricardo Baiano was born in Ilhéus, a major city located in the southern coastal region of Bahia, Brazil, 430 km south of Salvador, the state's capital. His brother, Wagner Santos Lago is also a footballer.

== Career statistics ==
=== Club ===
Appearances and goals by club, season and competition
Club	Season	League		Cup		Europe		Total	
Club	Season	Apps	Goals	Apps	Goals	Apps	Goals	Apps	Goals
Kuban Krasnodar	2004	15	3	0	0	–		15	3
Kuban Krasnodar	2005	25	3	2	1	–		27	4
Kuban Krasnodar	2006	33	12	2	0	–		35	12
Kuban Krasnodar	2007	23	3	2	0	–		25	3
Kuban Krasnodar	Total	96	21	6	1	–		102	22
Spartak Nalchik	2008	6	1	0	0	–		6	1
Moscow (loan)	2008	8	0	0	0	2	0	10	0
Krasnodar	2009	20	4	2	0	–		22	4
Spartak Nalchik (loan)	2009	9	1	0	0	–		9	1
Zhemchuzhina-Sochi	2010	33	2	1	0	–		34	2
Zhemchuzhina-Sochi	2011–12	8	0	2	0	–		10	0
Zhemchuzhina-Sochi	Total	41	2	3	0	–		44	2
Khimki	2011–12	7	0	0	0	–		7	0
Široki Brijeg	2011–12	7	2	3	0	–		10	2
Široki Brijeg	2012–13	9	2	0	0	2	0	11	2
Široki Brijeg	Total	16	4	3	0	2	0	21	4
Career total		203	33	14	1	4	0	221	34

=== International ===
Appearances and goals by national team and year
National team	Year	Apps	Goals
Bosnia and Herzegovina
Bosnia and Herzegovina	2004	1	0
Total		1	0
