= 2005 Russian First Division =

Russian First Division
- Season: 2005

The 2005 Russian First Division was the 14th edition of Russian First Division. There were 22 teams.

== League table ==
Pos	Team	Pld	W	D	L	GF	GA	GD	Pts	Promotion or relegation
1	Luch-Energia Vladivostok (P)	42	27	11	4	81	32	+49	92	Promotion to Premier League
2	Spartak Nalchik (P)	42	25	11	6	67	36	+31	86	Promotion to Premier League
3	KAMAZ Naberezhnye Chelny	42	26	6	10	80	32	+48	84	
4	Khimki	42	23	13	6	75	36	+39	82	
5	Kuban Krasnodar	42	23	12	7	55	25	+30	81	
6	Dynamo Makhachkala	42	23	7	12	64	41	+23	76	
7	Ural Sverdlovsk Oblast	42	21	10	11	51	34	+17	73	
8	Oryol	42	17	12	13	55	48	+7	63	
9	Spartak Chelyabinsk	42	16	13	13	60	53	+7	61	
10	Chkalovets-1936 Novosibirsk	42	15	11	16	51	53	−2	56	
11	Anzhi Makhachkala	42	14	13	15	47	48	−1	55	
12	SKA-Khabarovsk	42	15	9	18	40	43	−3	54	
13	Dynamo Bryansk	42	13	13	16	44	49	−5	52	
14	Volgar-Gazprom Astrakhan	42	14	9	19	50	56	−6	51	
15	Lokomotiv Chita	42	14	8	20	57	67	−10	50	
16	Avangard Kursk	42	11	15	16	36	45	−9	48	
17	Fakel Voronezh	42	13	7	22	39	60	−21	46	
18	Metallurg-Kuzbass Novokuznetsk (R)	42	10	15	17	48	61	−13	45	Relegation to Second Division
19	Amur Blagoveshchensk (R)	42	10	7	25	44	70	−26	37	Relegation to Second Division
20	Metallurg Lipetsk (R)	42	7	5	30	40	78	−38	26	Relegation to Second Division
21	Petrotrest Saint Petersburg (R)	42	7	5	30	37	107	−70	26	Relegation to Second Division
22	Sokol Saratov (Note: 6 points deducted for failing to pay transfer fee in time) (R)	42	7	10	25	37	84	−47	25	Relegation to Second Division

Source: PFL, RSSSF
(P) Promoted; (R) Relegated

== Results ==
Home \ Away	AMU	ANZ	AVA	CHK	DBR	DMK	FAK	KAM	KHI	KUB	LCH	LUC	MTK	MTL	ORY	PET	SKA	SPC	SPN	SOK	URA	VOL
Amur Blagoveshchensk		2–0	0–1	2–0	1–1	1–3	4–0	1–4	1–3	0–0	1–2	1–2	3–1	0–1	1–4	3–1	1–3	0–1	2–3	3–0	0–2	0–0
Anzhi Makhachkala	0–1		1–1	2–1	0–0	1–1	1–0	1–0	0–0	0–0	0–2	2–3	1–2	3–0	0–1	1–0	0–0	1–0	3–1	2–1	3–1	2–0
Avangard Kursk	1–1	0–1		1–4	2–0	1–0	1–1	0–2	1–2	0–1	2–0	1–1	0–1	1–0	2–0	0–0	1–1	1–1	0–1	4–2	1–1	2–1
Chkalovets-1936 Novosibirsk	1–1	2–3	0–0		0–0	1–1	2–1	0–3	1–0	0–0	2–0	0–3	2–2	2–0	0–0	0–1	2–0	1–1	0–0	3–0	3–2	3–0
Dynamo Bryansk	3–2	2–0	2–0	2–3		0–1	1–0	0–0	0–2	1–0	1–0	1–3	1–1	2–1	2–3	4–0	0–4	1–1	0–0	4–1	2–0	1–0
Dynamo Makhachkala	2–0	4–2	2–0	1–3	1–2		1–0	2–0	1–1	0–1	2–0	2–1	1–2	1–0	2–0	2–0	2–0	4–2	1–0	4–1	2–1	1–0
Fakel Voronezh	0–2	4–3	1–1	2–3	2–0	0–0		1–0	1–2	0–0	1–0	1–0	1–0	2–0	1–0	1–3	3–1	0–4	0–0	4–1	1–3	2–1
KAMAZ	2–0	1–2	4–1	2–0	2–0	3–1	4–1		0–2	0–0	4–1	0–1	4–2	5–0	3–2	2–1	3–0	2–0	0–1	3–0	2–0	2–0
Khimki	1–2	1–0	2–0	4–0	0–0	1–1	3–1	2–2		3–1	0–0	0–0	1–1	4–0	1–1	3–0	1–0	2–1	2–2	3–0	3–1	3–1
Kuban Krasnodar	3–0	2–0	0–0	3–0	3–1	4–0	1–0	0–1	2–1		2–1	2–1	3–0	1–0	1–1	3–0	2–1	1–1	2–0	3–0	0–0	3–0
Lokomotiv Chita	2–1	3–2	1–1	1–0	1–1	2–3	1–0	0–2	0–1	2–3		1–4	5–0	3–1	3–3	3–1	0–1	1–1	1–0	3–1	0–2	3–2
Luch-Energia Vladivostok	3–0	2–2	0–0	2–0	2–0	2–1	3–0	3–2	2–1	1–1	2–0		2–1	2–1	2–0	2–0	1–0	3–2	2–0	5–0	2–0	2–2
Metallurg-Kuzbass	1–1	0–0	0–2	2–0	0–0	0–0	1–2	0–0	2–0	0–1	2–2	3–4		4–3	1–1	1–1	1–1	2–2	0–3	5–0	0–2	0–2
Metallurg Lipetsk	2–0	2–1	0–2	1–4	2–2	2–1	1–0	0–1	1–4	0–1	0–1	2–2	2–2		0–0	5–0	1–2	2–3	1–1	2–3	2–0	0–1
Oryol	3–1	0–2	2–1	0–3	3–2	0–0	4–0	1–1	2–2	0–1	3–0	1–1	2–1	1–0		2–0	1–0	3–1	2–2	2–1	0–0	1–0
Petrotrest St. Petersburg	4–3	1–1	3–2	1–4	0–1	0–5	0–2	1–7	0–3	0–2	1–6	0–6	0–1	4–3	2–1		0–1	0–3	1–2	2–1	2–3	2–2
SKA-Khabarovsk	0–1	2–2	0–0	1–1	1–0	1–0	0–0	1–3	0–1	1–1	2–1	0–3	2–0	2–1	0–1	1–0		4–0	1–2	2–0	0–2	2–1
Spartak Chelyabinsk	3–0	0–0	0–0	0–0	2–1	0–1	3–2	1–0	1–5	2–0	2–2	2–0	1–0	3–0	2–1	5–0	0–1		2–2	2–1	1–1	2–1
Spartak Nalchik	2–0	3–1	3–0	1–0	1–0	3–2	2–0	2–1	5–2	3–0	1–1	0–0	0–3	2–0	1–0	4–2	1–0	3–0		2–0	2–0	1–1
Sokol Saratov	0–0	0–0	0–1	1–0	1–1	0–2	1–1	1–2	1–1	1–1	3–1	0–1	1–1	2–1	2–0	3–1	0–0	1–1	2–3		0–3	2–0
Ural Sverdlovsk Oblast	1–0	1–0	1–0	2–0	2–1	2–0	1–0	0–0	0–0	2–0	2–1	0–0	1–2	1–0	0–1	1–1	1–0	1–0	1–1	3–0		3–0
Volgar-Gazprom	4–1	1–1	2–1	4–0	1–1	1–3	1–0	0–1	1–2	1–0	4–0	0–0	1–0	2–0	3–2	2–1	2–1	2–1	0–1	2–2	1–1	

Source: PFL (in Russian)
Legend: Blue = home team win; Yellow = draw; Red = away team win.

== Top goalscorers ==
Rank	Player	Team	Goals
1	(Russia) Yevgeni Alkhimov	Lokomotiv (Ch)	24
2	(Russia) Dmitri Smirnov	Luch-Energia	19
3	(Russia) Dmitri Akimov	Chkalovets-1936	18
3	(Ukraine) Roman Monaryov	KAMAZ	18
3	(Ukraine) Andriy Poroshyn	Spartak (N)	18
6	(Russia) Vardan Mazalov	Spartak (Ch)	15
6	(Russia) Andrey Tikhonov	Khimki	15

== See also ==
- 2005 Russian Premier League
