= Alborov =

Alborov (masculine, Russian: Алборов) or Alborova (feminine, Russian: Алборова) is a Russian surname. Notable people with the surname include:

- Alan Alborov (born 1989), Russian footballer
- Igor Alborov (born 1982), Uzbekistani boxer
- Mirza Alborov (born 1987), Russian footballer
- Ruslan Alborov (born 1983), Russian footballer
