= Alan Kusov =

Russian footballer

Personal information
- Full name: Alan Taimurazovich Kusov
- Date of birth: 11 August 1981 (age 45)
- Place of birth: Ordzhonikidze, Russian SFSR
- Height: 1.93 m (6 ft 4 in)
- Position: Midfielder

Senior career*
Years	Team	Apps	(Gls)
1997–1998	FC Alania-d Vladikavkaz	22	(3)
1999	FC Iriston Vladikavkaz	19	(1)
2000–2002	FC Alania Vladikavkaz	54	(4)
2003	PFC CSKA Moscow	11	(0)
2003–2004	→ FC Alania Vladikavkaz (loan)	23	(0)
2005	→ FC Spartak Chelyabinsk (loan)	21	(1)
2008	FC Zvezda Irkutsk	2	(0)
2008–2009	Standard Baku	24	(0)
2009	FC Anzhi Makhachkala	3	(0)
2010	FC Torpedo Moscow	13	(4)
2011	FC Alania Vladikavkaz	5	(1)
2011–2012	FC Luch-Energiya Vladivostok	22	(1)
2013–2014	Lokomotiv Tashkent	1	(1)
2014	FC Dolgoprudny	7	(0)
2014	FC Zhemchuzhina Yalta	0	(0)
2019	FC Spartak Vladikavkaz	9	(0)

International career
2001–2003	Russia U-21	13	(2)
2003	Russia	1	(0)

Managerial career
- 2019: FC Spartak Vladikavkaz (director)
- * Club domestic league appearances and goals

Alan Taimurazovich Kusov (Russian: Алан Таймуразович Кусов; born 11 August 1981) is a Russian former association football player.

== Career ==
He made his Russian Premier League debut for FC Alania Vladikavkaz on 18 June 2000 in a game against FC Uralan Elista.

He played 5 seasons in the Russian Premier League, and also appeared in a Champions League qualifier for PFC CSKA Moscow.

He missed 2006 and 2007 seasons due to undisclosed injury. In the summer of 2008, he has been sold to Standard Baku from Azerbaijan.

On 2 September 2019, he was registered as a player for FC Spartak Vladikavkaz after a 5-year break from playing.

== Personal life ==
His younger brother Artur Kusov also played professionally.

== Honours ==
- Russian Premier League winner: 2003.

== International career ==
Kusov made his debut for Russia on 13 February 2003 in a friendly against Romania. That was his only cap.
