= Žutautas =

Žutautas is a surname. Notable people with the surname include:

- Darius Žutautas (born 1978), Lithuanian footballer
- Giedrius Žutautas (born 1974), Lithuanian footballer
- Raimondas Žutautas (born 1972), Lithuanian footballer and coach
- Vaidas Žutautas (born 1973), Lithuanian footballer
