= 2005 in Russian football =

2005 season

2005 was marked by a greatest success in the Russian club football so far, as CSKA Moscow won the UEFA Cup. Later, CSKA completed the treble, winning the Russian Cup and the Russian Premier League title. Notable changes in the Russian Football Union also took place.

== Changes in the Russian Football Union ==
On 2 April, Vitaliy Mutko was elected new president of the Russian Football Union to succeed Vyacheslav Koloskov. Two days later, national team coach Georgi Yartsev resigned and was replaced by Yuri Semin. However, Semin stepped down on 10 November, after Russia failed to qualify for the 2006 World Cup.

== National team ==
The Russia national team attempted to qualify for the 2006 FIFA World Cup via European qualifying group 3. A scoreless draw in Bratislava against Slovakia on 12 October, the final group match for both teams, ended Russia's hopes of qualifying for Germany. Portugal won the group and automatically qualified for the finals. Russia and Slovakia finished level on points for second place and a place in the UEFA playoffs; Slovakia won the tiebreaker on overall goal difference in the group. A Russia win in the final match would have sent Russia to the playoffs at Slovakia's expense.

Date	Venue	Opponents	Score^{1}	Competition	Russia scorers	Match Report
9 February 2005	Stadio Sant'Elia, Cagliari (A)	Italy	0–2	F		Sport-Express
26 March 2005	Rheinpark Stadion, Vaduz (A)	Liechtenstein	2–1	WCQ	Aleksandr Kerzhakov, Andrey Karyaka	FIFA
30 March 2005	A. Le Coq Arena, Tallinn (A)	Estonia	1–1	WCQ	Andrei Arshavin	FIFA
4 June 2005	Petrovsky Stadium, Saint Petersburg (H)	Latvia	2–0	WCQ	Andrei Arshavin, Dmitri Loskov	FIFA
8 June 2005	Borussia-Park, Mönchengladbach (A)	Germany	2–2	F	Aleksandr Anyukov, Andrei Arshavin	Sport-Express
17 August 2005	Skonto stadions, Riga (A)	Latvia	1–1	WCQ	Andrei Arshavin	FIFA
3 September 2005	Lokomotiv Stadium, Moscow (H)	Liechtenstein	2–0	WCQ	Aleksandr Kerzhakov (2)	FIFA
7 September 2005	Lokomotiv Stadium, Moscow (H)	Portugal	0–0	WCQ		FIFA
8 October 2005	Lokomotiv Stadium, Moscow (H)	Luxembourg	5–1	WCQ	Marat Izmailov, Aleksandr Kerzhakov, Roman Pavlyuchenko, Dmitri Kirichenko (2)	FIFA
12 October 2005	Tehelné Pole, Bratislava (A)	Slovakia	0–0	WCQ		FIFA

1. Russia score given first

Key

- H = Home match
- A = Away match
- F = Friendly
- WCQ = 2006 FIFA World Cup Qualifying, Group 3

=== U-21 team ===
The U-21 team contested the qualification for the 2006 U-21 Championship. They finished second in the group, overcoming Slovakia on head-to-head results, while Portugal were first. This allowed Russia to qualify for the play-off against Denmark.

Russia lost both play-off matches, 0–1 in Moscow on 12 November and 1–3 in Brøndby on 18 November. In the second-leg match, five Russia players were sent off.

=== Women's U-19 team ===
The women's under-19 team won the European Championship in Hungary. They have finished second in the group stage after matches against France, England, and Scotland. In the semifinal they overcame Germany 3–1, thanks to the hat-trick by captain Elena Danilova, and the final match against France ended 2–2 after extra time and 6–5 on penalties.

== Leagues ==
=== Premier League ===
Pos	Team	Pld	W	D	L	GF	GA	GD	Pts	Qualification or relegation
1	CSKA Moscow (C)	30	18	8	4	48	20	+28	62	Qualification to Champions League third qualifying round
2	Spartak Moscow	30	16	8	6	47	26	+21	56	Qualification to Champions League second qualifying round
3	Lokomotiv Moscow	30	14	14	2	41	18	+23	56	Qualification to UEFA Cup first round (Note: Since CSKA Moscow won the 2005–06 Russian Cup, and winner of the Russian Cup should advance to the First Round of UEFA Cup, the spot was awarded to 3rd-positioned team, because CSKA Moscow already qualified for UEFA Champions League. As a result, 4th-positioned team received a spot in the Second Qualifying Round of UEFA Cup, and 5th-positioned team received a spot in the Second Round of UEFA Intertoto Cup)
4	Rubin Kazan	30	14	9	7	45	31	+14	51	Qualification to UEFA Cup second qualifying round
5	FC Moscow	30	14	8	8	36	26	+10	50	Qualification to Intertoto Cup second round
6	Zenit St. Petersburg	30	13	10	7	45	26	+19	49	
7	Torpedo Moscow	30	12	9	9	37	33	+4	45	
8	Dynamo Moscow	20	12	2	6	36	46	−10	38	
9	Shinnik Yaroslavl	30	9	11	10	26	31	−5	38	
10	Tom Tomsk	30	9	10	11	28	33	−5	37	
11	Saturn	30	8	9	13	23	25	−2	33	
12	Amkar Perm	30	7	12	11	25	36	−11	33	
13	Rostov	30	8	7	15	26	41	−15	31	
14	Krylia Sovetov Samara	30	7	8	15	29	44	−15	29	
15	Alania Vladikavkaz (R)	30	5	8	17	27	53	−26	23	Relegation to First Division
16	Terek Grozny (Note: Terek had 6 points deducted for failing to pay transfer fee in time.) (R)	30	5	5	20	20	50	−30	14	Relegation to First Division

Source: RFPL
Rules for classification: 1st points; 2nd matches won; 3rd goal difference; 4th head-to-head (points, matches won, goal difference, goals scored, away goals scored)
(C) Champions; (R) Relegated

=== First Division ===
Pos	Team	Pld	W	D	L	GF	GA	GD	Pts	Promotion or relegation
1	Luch-Energia Vladivostok (P)	42	27	11	4	81	32	+49	92	Promotion to Premier League
2	Spartak Nalchik (P)	42	25	11	6	67	36	+31	86	Promotion to Premier League
3	KAMAZ Naberezhnye Chelny	42	26	6	10	80	32	+48	84	
4	Khimki	42	23	13	6	75	36	+39	82	
5	Kuban Krasnodar	42	23	12	7	55	25	+30	81	
6	Dynamo Makhachkala	42	23	7	12	64	41	+23	76	
7	Ural Sverdlovsk Oblast	42	21	10	11	51	34	+17	73	
8	Oryol	42	17	12	13	55	48	+7	63	
9	Spartak Chelyabinsk	42	16	13	13	60	53	+7	61	
10	Chkalovets-1936 Novosibirsk	42	15	11	16	51	53	−2	56	
11	Anzhi Makhachkala	42	14	13	15	47	48	−1	55	
12	SKA-Khabarovsk	42	15	9	18	40	43	−3	54	
13	Dynamo Bryansk	42	13	13	16	44	49	−5	52	
14	Volgar-Gazprom Astrakhan	42	14	9	19	50	56	−6	51	
15	Lokomotiv Chita	42	14	8	20	57	67	−10	50	
16	Avangard Kursk	42	11	15	16	36	45	−9	48	
17	Fakel Voronezh	42	13	7	22	39	60	−21	46	
18	Metallurg-Kuzbass Novokuznetsk (R)	42	10	15	17	48	61	−13	45	Relegation to Second Division
19	Amur Blagoveshchensk (R)	42	10	7	25	44	70	−26	37	Relegation to Second Division
20	Metallurg Lipetsk (R)	42	7	5	30	40	78	−38	26	Relegation to Second Division
21	Petrotrest Saint Petersburg (R)	42	7	5	30	37	107	−70	26	Relegation to Second Division
22	Sokol Saratov (Note: 6 points deducted for failing to pay transfer fee in time) (R)	42	7	10	25	37	84	−47	25	Relegation to Second Division

Source: PFL, RSSSF
(P) Promoted; (R) Relegated
Notes:

Yevgeny Alkhimov of Lokomotiv became the top scorer with 24 goals.

=== Second Division ===
The following clubs have earned promotion by winning tournaments in their respective Second Division zones:

- FC Baltika Kaliningrad (West)
- FC Salyut-Energiya Belgorod (Centre)
- FC Angusht Nazran (South)
- FC Sodovik Sterlitamak (Ural-Povolzhye)
- FC Metallurg Krasnoyarsk (East)

== Russian Cup ==
Defending Russian Cup holders Terek Grozny were knocked out by their first opponents, Amkar Perm. For the second year in a row, the First Division side was present in the final, this time FC Khimki. But unlike the 2004, the final match was won 1–0 by the Premier League club, CSKA Moscow. CSKA lost the first-leg match 2–0 to their first opponents, Sokol Saratov, and progressed thanks to an awarded 3–0 victory after Sokol failed to show for the second leg.

== UEFA club competitions ==
=== 2004–05 UEFA Cup ===
Only CSKA Moscow qualified for the spring phase of the UEFA Cup 2004–05. They successively defeated Benfica, Partizan Belgrade, Auxerre, and Parma to reach the final. In the final match played in Lisbon, CSKA defeated Sporting Clube de Portugal 3–1 to become the first ever Russian club to win any major European competition.

=== UEFA Super Cup ===
CSKA Moscow lost the European Super Cup match 3–1 to Liverpool F.C., the UEFA Champions League title holders.

=== UEFA Champions League 2005–06 ===
Lokomotiv Moscow, the only Russian side to participate in the UEFA Champions League 2005–06, defeated FK Rabotnički in the second qualifying round, but were knocked out by Rapid Vienna in the third qualifying round. Along with the other losers in the third qualifying round, Lokomotiv entered the UEFA Cup at the first round proper.

=== 2005–06 UEFA Cup ===
CSKA Moscow, Lokomotiv Moscow, and Zenit Saint Petersburg have qualified for the group stage of the UEFA Cup 2005–06. Krylya Sovetov Samara have successfully passed the second qualifying round, but were knocked out in the first round proper by AZ Alkmaar.

Zenit and Lokomotiv qualified for the Round of 32. CSKA finished fourth in the group and thus failed to defend their title.
