= Sergei Bagayev =

Russian footballer

Personal information
- Full name: Sergei Malkhazovich Bagayev
- Date of birth: 6 April 1985 (age 41)
- Height: 1.82 m (6 ft 0 in)
- Position: Defender

Youth career
- Yunost Vladikavkaz

Senior career*
| Years | Team | Apps | (Gls) |
| 2001 | FC Alania-d Vladikavkaz (amateur) | | |
| 2002–2003 | FC Avtodor Vladikavkaz | 9 | (0) |
| 2005 | FC Torpedo Volzhsky | 15 | (0) |
| 2006–2007 | FC Avtodor Vladikavkaz | 40 | (0) |
| 2008 | FC Smena Komsomolsk-na-Amure | 26 | (1) |
| 2009–2010 | FC Irtysh Omsk | 55 | (3) |
| 2011–2012 | FC Mostovik-Primorye Ussuriysk | 35 | (1) |
| 2012–2013 | FC Amur-2010 Blagoveshchensk | 24 | (1) |
| 2013–2014 | FC Irtysh Omsk | 9 | (0) |
- * Club domestic league appearances and goals

Sergei Malkhazovich Bagayev (Russian: Серге́й Малхазович Багаев; born 6 April 1985) is a former Russian professional football player.

== Club career ==
He played in the Russian Football National League for FC Irtysh Omsk in 2010.
