= Daraselia =

Daraselia (Georgian: დარასელია) is a Georgian surname that may refer to:

- Vitaly Daraselia, (1957–1982), Georgian football midfielder
- Vitali Daraselia Jr. (born 1978), Georgian football midfielder, son of Vitaly
- Giorgi Daraselia (born 1968), Georgian-Israeli football player
