= Aleksei Tikhonkikh =

Aleksei Tikhonkikh may refer to:

- Aleksei Tikhonkikh (gymnast), Soviet gymnast in 1985 World Artistic Gymnastics Championships
- Aleksei Tikhonkikh (footballer) (born 1977), Russian footballer
