= Amzor Ailarov =

Russian footballer and official

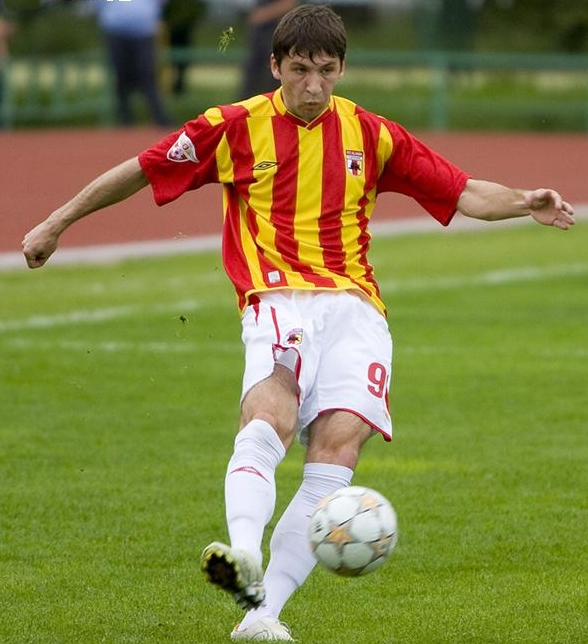
- Amzor Ailarov (2008)

Personal information
- Full name: Amzor Nikolayevich Ailarov
- Date of birth: 29 January 1982 (age 44)
- Place of birth: Ordzhonikidze, Russian SFSR
- Height: 1.79 m (5 ft 10 1/2 in)
- Position: Midfielder

Team information
- Current team: FC Alania Vladikavkaz (general director)

Senior career*
| Years | Team | Apps | (Gls) |
| 1998–2000 | FC Avtodor Vladikavkaz | 33 | (1) |
| 2000 | FC Iriston Vladikavkaz | 17 | (0) |
| 2001 | FC Avtodor Vladikavkaz | 35 | (1) |
| 2002–2009 | FC Alania Vladikavkaz | 136 | (18) |
| 2005 | → FC SKA-Energia Khabarovsk (loan) | 19 | (1) |
| 2010 | FC Salyut Belgorod | 3 | (0) |
| 2010 | FC Volgar-Gazprom Astrakhan | 5 | (1) |

International career
| 2003 | Russia U-21 | 2 | (0) |

Managerial career
- 2019: FC Spartak Vladikavkaz (general director)
- 2019–: FC Alania Vladikavkaz (general director)
- * Club domestic league appearances and goals

Amzor (or Anzor) Nikolayevich Ailarov (Russian: Амзор Николаевич Айларов; born 29 January 1982) is a Russian professional football official and a former player. He is the general director of FC Alania Vladikavkaz.

== Club career ==
He made his debut in the Russian Premier League in 2002 for FC Alania Vladikavkaz.
