= Ilya Postukhov =

Russian footballer

Personal information
- Full name: Ilya Vasilyevich Postukhov
- Date of birth: 9 March 1999 (age 27)
- Height: 1.89 m (6 ft 2 1/2 in)
- Position: Defender

Senior career*
Years	Team	Apps	(Gls)
2018–2020	FC Luch Vladivostok	3	(0)
2020	FC Chita	2	(0)
- * Club domestic league appearances and goals as of 12 August 2020

Ilya Vasilyevich Postukhov (Russian: Илья Васильевич Постухов; born 9 March 1999) is a Russian football player.

== Club career ==
He made his debut in the Russian Football National League for FC Luch Vladivostok on 30 March 2019 in a game against FC Tambov.
