= Vladimir Kaloyev =

Russian footballer

Personal information
- Full name: Vladimir Yuryevich Kaloyev
- Date of birth: 12 February 1973 (age 53)
- Height: 1.78 m (5 ft 10 in)
- Positions: Forward; midfielder

Senior career*
Years	Team	Apps	(Gls)
1989	FC Spartak Ordzhonikidze	1	(0)
1990–1992	FC Avtodor Vladikavkaz	83	(6)
1993–1994	FC Dynamo Stavropol	6	(0)
1994–1995	FC Avtodor Vladikavkaz	44	(1)
1997	FC Avtozapchast Baksan	32	(2)
1998	FC Iriston Vladikavkaz	12	(1)
2000	FC Iriston Vladikavkaz	9	(1)
2000	FC Lokomotiv-Taym Mineralnye Vody (amateur)		
2000	PFC Spartak Nalchik	0	(0)
2001	FC Vladikavkaz (amateur)		
2002	FC Alania Vladikavkaz	0	(0)
2002	FC Mashuk Pyatigorsk (amateur)		
2003	FC Vityaz Krymsk	3	(1)
2004	FC Vladikavkaz (amateur)		
- * Club domestic league appearances and goals

Vladimir Yuryevich Kaloyev (Russian: Владимир Юрьевич Калоев; born 12 February 1973) is a former Russian football player.
