= Nikita Kozlov =

Russian footballer

Personal information
- Full name: Nikita Denisovich Kozlov
- Date of birth: 4 April 1997 (age 29)
- Place of birth: Tomsk, Russia
- Height: 1.75 m (5 ft 9 in)
- Position: Midfielder

Youth career
- –2014: Tom Tomsk
- 2014: Khimki

Senior career*
Years	Team	Apps	(Gls)
2015	Khimki-M (amateur)		
2016	Rodina Moscow (amateur)		
2016	LFK Torpedo Moscow		
2018	Chita	8	(0)
2019–2020	Naftan Novopolotsk	12	(0)
2022	Sakhalin Yuzhno-Sakhalinsk	0	(0)
2022	FC Troitsk (amateur)		
- * Club domestic league appearances and goals as of 5 June 2022

Nikita Denisovich Kozlov (Russian: Никита Денисович Козлов; born 4 April 1997) is a Russian former football player.

== Club career ==
He made his debut in the Russian Professional Football League for FC Chita on 4 August 2018 in a game against FC Irtysh Omsk.
