= Andrey Morev =

Kazakhstani footballer (1973–2025)

Personal information
- Date of birth: 3 October 1973
- Place of birth: Omsk, Russian SFSR, USSR
- Date of death: 26 October 2025 (aged 52)
- Height: 1.88 m (6 ft 2 in)
- Position: Goalkeeper

Senior career*
Years	Team	Apps	(Gls)
1991–1997	FC Zarya Leninsk-Kuznetsky	176	(0)
1998	Irtysh Omsk	7	(0)
1999	FC Zhenis	22	(0)
2000	FC Akmola	23	(0)
2001–2003	Lokomotiv Chita	75	(0)
2004	FC Ekibastuzets	32	(0)
2005–2006	Tobol Kostanay	41	(0)
2007–2008	FC Aktobe	34	(0)
2009–	FC Kyzylzhar	0	(0)

International career
2004	Kazakhstan	2	(0)
- * Club domestic league appearances and goals

Andrey Morev (3 October 1973 – 26 October 2025) was a Kazakhstani footballer who played as a goalkeeper. He made two appearances for the Kazakhstan national team. Morev died on 26 October 2025, at the age of 52.
