= Mirza Alborov =

Russian footballer (born 1987)

Personal information
- Full name: Mirza Bakurovich Alborov
- Date of birth: 17 December 1987 (age 38)
- Place of birth: Ordzhonikidze, Russian SFSR
- Height: 1.75 m (5 ft 9 in)
- Position: Midfielder

Youth career
- Yunost Vladikavkaz

Senior career*
Years	Team	Apps	(Gls)
2004–2009	FC Alania Vladikavkaz	1	(0)
2006	→ FC Vladikavkaz (loan)		
2006	→ FC Avtodor Vladikavkaz (loan)	24	(2)
2006–2009	FK Mornar		
2009	→ FC Avtodor Vladikavkaz (loan)	27	(2)
2010	FC Neftekhimik Nizhnekamsk	12	(0)
2011–2013	FC Salyut Belgorod	51	(2)
2013–2014	FC Avangard Kursk	12	(0)
2014	FC Anapa (amateur)		
2014–2015	FC TSK Simferopol	27	(1)
2016	FC Berkut Armyansk	1	(0)
2016–2017	FC Dynamo Bryansk	18	(0)
2017	FC Znamya Truda Orekhovo-Zuyevo	1	(0)
2017	FC Kyzyltash Bakhchisaray	5	(0)
2017	FC TSK Simferopol	3	(0)
2018	FC UOR Krasnolesye		
2018–2019	FC Shchit Osetii Vladikavkaz		
2018	FC Alania Oktyabrskoye		
2018	FC Olimp Khimki (amateur)		
2019	FC Stroitel Russkoye		
2020	FC Kafa Feodosia		
- * Club domestic league appearances and goals

Mirza Bakurovich Alborov (Russian: Мирза Бакурович Алборов; born 17 December 1987) is a Russian former professional footballer.

== Club career ==
He made his debut in the Russian Premier League in 2005 for FC Alania Vladikavkaz.
