= Maksim Kreisman =

Russian footballer

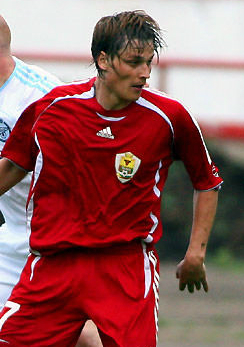
- Maksim Sergeyevich Kreisman

Personal information
- Full name: Maksim Sergeyevich Kreisman
- Date of birth: 14 November 1976 (age 49)
- Height: 1.81 m (5 ft 11 1/2 in)
- Position: Midfielder

Youth career
- FC Lokomotiv Chita

Senior career*
Years	Team	Apps	(Gls)
1994–2001	FC Lokomotiv Chita	234	(28)
2002	FC Shinnik Yaroslavl	4	(0)
2002–2004	FC Lokomotiv Chita	71	(6)
2005	FC Oryol	12	(0)
2005–2009	FC Chita	137	(24)
- * Club domestic league appearances and goals

Maksim Sergeyevich Kreisman (Russian: Максим Серге́евич Крейсман; born 14 November 1976) is a former Russian professional footballer.

== Club career ==
He made his debut in the Russian Premier League in 2002 for FC Shinnik Yaroslavl.
