= Alan Agayev =

Russian footballer (born 1977)

Personal information
- Full name: Alan Khazbiyevich Agayev
- Date of birth: 31 March 1977 (age 49)
- Place of birth: Ordzhonikidze, Russian SFSR
- Height: 1.86 m (6 ft 1 in)
- Position: Midfielder

Youth career
- Yunost Vladikavkaz

Senior career*
Years	Team	Apps	(Gls)
1994	FC Iriston Vladikavkaz	35	(0)
1995–2007	FC Alania Vladikavkaz	210	(4)

International career
1995–1996	Russia U-21	10	(0)
- * Club domestic league appearances and goals

Alan Khazbiyevich Agayev (Russian: Алан Хазбиевич Агаев; born 31 March 1977) is a Russian former professional footballer.

== Club career ==
He made his professional debut in the Russian Second Division in 1994 for FC Iriston Vladikavkaz.

== Honours ==
- Russian Premier League champion: 1995.
- Russian Premier League runner-up: 1996.

== European club competitions ==
With FC Alania Vladikavkaz.

- UEFA Champions League 1996–97 qualification: 2 games.
- UEFA Cup 1996–97: 2 games.
- UEFA Cup 1997–98: 3 games.
