= Roman Gavryush =

Russian footballer

Personal information
- Full name: Roman Igorevich Gavryush
- Date of birth: 31 August 1983 (age 43)
- Height: 1.80 m (5 ft 11 in)
- Position: Midfielder

Youth career
- FC Lokomotiv Chita

Senior career*
Years	Team	Apps	(Gls)
2000–2001	FC Lokomotiv Chita	0	(0)
2001	FC Selenga Ulan-Ude	10	(1)
2002	FC Lokomotiv Chita	2	(0)
2003	FC Sibiryak Bratsk	23	(7)
2004–2016	FC Chita	230	(24)
2007	→ FC Sibiryak Bratsk (loan)	15	(4)
- * Club domestic league appearances and goals

Roman Igorevich Gavryush (Russian: Роман Игоревич Гаврюш; born 31 August 1983) is a former Russian professional football player.

== Club career ==
He played 4 seasons in the Russian Football National League for FC Chita.
