= Aleksei Tikhonkikh (footballer) =

Russian footballer

Personal information
- Full name: Aleksei Vladimirovich Tikhonkikh
- Date of birth: 3 April 1977 (age 49)
- Height: 1.81 m (5 ft 11 1/2 in)
- Position: Forward

Team information
- Current team: FC Chita (director)

Senior career*
Years	Team	Apps	(Gls)
1998	FC Lokomotiv Chita	0	(0)
1998–1999	FC Selenga Ulan-Ude	44	(12)
1999–2000	FC Zvezda Irkutsk	38	(9)
2001	FC Lokomotiv Chita	9	(1)
2001–2004	FC Metallurg-Kuzbass Novokuznetsk	88	(24)
2004	FC Chkalovets-1936 Novosibirsk	8	(0)
2005–2006	FC Zvezda Irkutsk	32	(13)
2006–2009	FC Chita	76	(33)
2010	FC Mostovik-Primorye Ussuriysk	15	(0)

Managerial career
- 2013–2015: FC Baikal Irkutsk (administrator)
- 2013–2015: FC Baikal Irkutsk (director)
- 2017–: FC Chita (director)
- * Club domestic league appearances and goals

Aleksei Vladimirovich Tikhonkikh (Russian: Алексей Владимирович Тихоньких; born 3 April 1977) is a former Russian professional football player. He works as the director for FC Chita.

== Club career ==
He played 3 seasons in the Russian Football National League for FC Lokomotiv Chita and FC Metallurg-Kuzbass Novokuznetsk.
