= Artur Kusov =

Russian footballer

Personal information
- Full name: Artur Taimurazovich Kusov
- Date of birth: May 3, 1986 (age 40)
- Place of birth: Ordzhonikidze, Russia, Soviet Union
- Height: 1.82 m (6 ft 0 in)
- Position: Forward

Senior career*
Years	Team	Apps	(Gls)
2004–2005	FC Alania Vladikavkaz	8	(0)
2006	FC Kuban Krasnodar	0	(0)
2006–2008	FC SKA Rostov-on-Don	23	(4)
2009	FC Avtodor Vladikavkaz	14	(4)
2010	FC Beslan-FAYUR Beslan	13	(1)
2010	FC Mashuk-KMV Pyatigorsk	7	(0)
2011–2012	FC Alania-d Vladikavkaz	3	(2)
- * Club domestic league appearances and goals

Artur Taimurazovich Kusov (Russian: Артур Таймуразович Кусов; born 3 May 1986) is a Russian former professional footballer.

== Club career ==
He made his debut in the Russian Premier League in 2004 for FC Alania Vladikavkaz.

== Personal life ==
He is the younger brother of Russian international Alan Kusov.
