= Vitali Belichenko =

Russian footballer

Personal information
- Full name: Vitali Sergeyevich Belichenko
- Date of birth: 25 August 1982 (age 44)
- Height: 1.92 m (6 ft 3 1/2 in)
- Position: Defender

Youth career
- FC Lokomotiv Chita

Senior career*
Years	Team	Apps	(Gls)
2003	FC Sibiryak Bratsk	21	(0)
2004–2007	FC Chita	108	(7)
2008	FC Dynamo Barnaul	34	(1)
2009–2016	FC Chita	163	(6)
- * Club domestic league appearances and goals

Vitali Sergeyevich Belichenko (Russian: Виталий Серге́евич Беличенко; born 25 August 1982) is a former Russian professional football player.

== Club career ==
He played 3 seasons in the Russian Football National League for FC Chita and FC Dynamo Barnaul.
