= Nikolai Kotovets =

Russian footballer and manager

Personal information
- Full name: Nikolai Nikolayevich Kotovets
- Date of birth: 25 June 1970 (age 56)
- Height: 1.86 m (6 ft 1 in)
- Positions: Defender; midfielder

Team information
- Current team: FC Sokol Saratov (assistant coach)

Youth career
- DYuSSh-11 Volgograd

Senior career*
Years	Team	Apps	(Gls)
1991	FC Volgar Astrakhan	37	(0)
1992	FC Rotor-d Volgograd	29	(0)
1994	FC Torpedo Volzhsky	1	(0)
1994	FC Kolos Bykovo	19	(1)
1995–1996	FC Energiya Pyatigorsk	50	(1)
1997	FC Torpedo Volzhsky	25	(0)
1998	FC Metallurg Krasnoyarsk	23	(1)
1999	FC Kavkazkabel Prokhladny	13	(2)
2000–2003	FC Volga Ulyanovsk	119	(0)
2004–2005	FC Lokomotiv Chita	80	(3)
2006	FC Dynamo Kirov	8	(0)
2006	FC Chita	18	(0)
2007	FC Amur Blagoveshchensk	30	(0)
2008	FC Energetik Uren	11	(1)
2009	FC FSA Voronezh	11	(1)

Managerial career
- 2016–2017: FC Alfa Volgograd
- 2017: FC Chayka Peschanokopskoye (assistant)
- 2020: FC Akron Tolyatti (assistant)
- 2021: FC Metallurg Vidnoye (assistant)
- 2021–2022: FC Dynamo Vladivostok (assistant)
- 2022–2023: FC Biolog-Novokubansk (assistant)
- 2023–2024: FC Sakhalinets Moscow (assistant)
- 2024: FC Dynamo Saint Petersburg (assistant)
- 2024: FC Dynamo Saint Petersburg (caretaker)
- 2025: FC Spartak Anapa (assistant)
- 2025–: FC Sokol Saratov (assistant)
- * Club domestic league appearances and goals

Nikolai Nikolayevich Kotovets (Russian: Николай Николаевич Котовец; born 25 June 1970) is a Russian professional football manager and a former player who is an assistant coach with FC Sokol Saratov.
