= Aleksandr Bodyalov =

Russian footballer

Personal information
- Full name: Aleksandr Anatolyevich Bodyalov
- Date of birth: 11 July 1977 (age 49)
- Place of birth: Krasnokamensk, Zabaykalsky Krai, Russian SFSR
- Height: 1.78 m (5 ft 10 in)
- Positions: Defender; midfielder

Senior career*
Years	Team	Apps	(Gls)
1996	FC Lokomotiv Chita	2	(0)
1996	FC Angara Angarsk	14	(0)
1997–2018	FC Chita	584	(3)
- * Club domestic league appearances and goals

Aleksandr Anatolyevich Bodyalov (Russian: Александр Анатольевич Бодялов; born 11 July 1977) is a former Russian professional football player.

== Club career ==
He played 11 seasons in the Russian Football National League for FC Chita.
