= Maksim Shvetsov =

Russian footballer and coach

Personal information
- Full name: Maksim Yuryevich Shvetsov
- Date of birth: 5 January 1973 (age 53)
- Place of birth: Orsk, Russian SFSR
- Height: 1.76 m (5 ft 9 1/2 in)
- Position: Midfielder

Youth career
- DYuSSh SKA DVO Khabarovsk

Senior career*
Years	Team	Apps	(Gls)
1990–1991	FC SKA Khabarovsk	30	(1)
1991	FC Zarya Khabarovsk		
1992–1996	FC SKA Khabarovsk	139	(19)
1997–1998	FC Zhemchuzhina Sochi	23	(2)
1997–1998	→ FC Zhemchuzhina-2 Sochi (loans)	7	(1)
1998–2000	FC SKA-Energiya Khabarovsk	67	(9)
2001–2005	FC Lokomotiv Chita	164	(16)
2006–2007	FC SKA-Energiya Khabarovsk	48	(2)
2008–2009	FC Ekspress Khabarovsk		

Managerial career
- 2009: FC Ekspress Khabarovsk
- 2012–2016: FC DSI Komsomolsk-na-Amure
- 2016–2018: FC Smena Komsomolsk-na-Amure
- 2018–2019: FC Sakhalin Yuzhno-Sakhalinsk
- 2019–2022: FC Chita
- 2023: FC Ryazan
- * Club domestic league appearances and goals

Maksim Yuryevich Shvetsov (Russian: Максим Юрьевич Швецов; born 5 January 1973) is a Russian football coach and a former player.

== Biography ==
=== Career as player ===
Since eight years old he was training at the sports school of the Army Sports Club in Khabarovsk, under coaches Oleg Nosenko and Vladimir Shindin. In 1990 he joined FC SKA-Khabarovsk. From the second half of the next season he became a player of the main squad. In 1996 with ten goals he became the top scorer of the team.

At the end of the season he received several offers from clubs of the Higher League and moved to FC Zhemchuzhina-Sochi, for which in a season and a half he played 23 games, scored 2 goals. In summer 1998 he returned to Khabarovsk, but because of the conflict with the head coach Oleg Smolyaninov in 2001 he transferred to FC Chita. In 2006, after Smolyaninov's departure, he returned to FC SKA-Khabarovsk, where he finished his professional career the following season.

=== Career as a coach ===
In 2008-2009, he was the head coach of the amateur club Express Khabarovsk, which existed for two seasons. From 2012 to 2016, he was the head coach of Russian Amateur Football League FC Dalstroyindustriya Komsomolsk-on-Amur. From 2016 to 2018, he was the head coach of Russian Second League club FC Smena Komsomolsk-na-Amure. From 2018 to 2019, he was the head coach of FC Sakhalin Yuzhno-Sakhalinsk. From summer 2019 to January 2022 he was the head coach and at the same time the manager of FC Chita. In 2023, from June, he was in charge of FC Ryazan.
