= Yan Ivanin =

Russian footballer

Personal information
- Full name: Yan Yuryevich Ivanin
- Date of birth: 4 March 1989 (age 37)
- Height: 1.81 m (5 ft 11 in)
- Position: Defender

Senior career*
Years	Team	Apps	(Gls)
2007–2008	SDYuShOR Chita		
2008	FC Zvezda Irkutsk	5	(0)
2009	FC Radian-Baikal Irkutsk (amateur)		
2010	SDYuShOR Chita Chita		
2011	FC Chita	0	(0)
2011–2013	FC Raspadskaya Mezhdurechensk (amateur)		
2014–2015	FC Restavratsiya Krasnoyarsk		
2016–2017	FC Rassvet-Restavratsiya Krasnoyarsk		
2018–2019	FC Spartak Zheleznogorsk		
- * Club domestic league appearances and goals

Yan Yuryevich Ivanin (Russian: Ян Юрьевич Иванин; born 4 March 1989) is a Russian former football defender.

== Club career ==
He played in the Russian Football National League for FC Zvezda Irkutsk in 2008.
