= 2006 Russian First Division =

Russian First Division
- Season: 2006
- Champions: Khimki
- Promoted: Khimki; Kuban Krasnodar
- Relegated: Spartak Nizhny Novgorod; Fakel Voronezh; Oryol; Metallurg Krasnoyarsk; Angusht Nazran
- Matches: 462
- Goals: 1,118 (2.42 per match)
- Top goalscorer: Yevgeni Alkhimov (25 goals)
- Biggest home win: Sibir Novosibirsk 8–0 Angusht Nazran (3 October 2006)
- Biggest away win: Lada-Togliatti 0–7 Kuban Krasnodar (16 September 2006)
- Highest scoring: Volgar-Gazprom 1–7 Dynamo Bryansk (24 August 2006); Sibir Novosibirsk 8–0 Angusht Nazran (3 October 2006)
- Average attendance: 4,506

The 2006 Russian First Division was the 15th edition of Russian First Division. There were 22 teams.

== League table ==
Pos	Team	Pld	W	D	L	GF	GA	GD	Pts	Promotion or relegation
1	Khimki (P)	42	30	9	3	83	30	+53	99	Promotion to Premier League
2	Kuban Krasnodar (P)	42	30	7	5	92	25	+67	97	Promotion to Premier League
3	Ural Sverdlovsk Oblast	42	27	9	6	67	23	+44	90	
4	KAMAZ Naberezhnye Chelny	42	22	11	9	54	26	+28	77	
5	SKA-Khabarovsk	42	21	8	13	67	40	+27	71	
6	Sodovik Sterlitamak	42	18	15	9	59	35	+24	69	
7	Sibir Novosibirsk	42	19	8	15	67	45	+22	65	
8	Terek Grozny	42	18	8	16	48	47	+1	62	
9	Dynamo Bryansk	42	17	10	15	42	38	+4	61	
10	Avangard Kursk	42	16	13	13	45	38	+7	61	
11	Volgar-Gazprom	42	17	9	16	45	47	−2	60	
12	Salyut-Energia Belgorod	42	15	11	16	46	58	−12	56	
13	Mashuk-KMV Pyatigorsk	42	16	7	19	41	56	−15	55	
14	Baltika Kaliningrad	42	14	13	15	41	56	−15	55	
15	Anzhi Makhachkala	42	15	8	19	57	66	−9	53	
16	Dynamo Makhachkala	42	13	12	17	56	54	+2	51	
17	Lada-Togliatti	42	13	6	23	38	63	−25	45	
18	Spartak Nizhny Novgorod (R)	42	10	13	19	46	60	−14	43	Relegation to Second Division
19	Fakel Voronezh (R)	42	10	12	20	27	54	−27	42	Relegation to Second Division
20	Oryol (Note: Oryol were docked 6 points for failing to pay a transfer fee.) (R)	42	8	11	23	35	72	−37	29	Relegation to Second Division
21	Metallurg Krasnoyarsk (R)	42	5	6	31	30	80	−50	21	Relegation to Second Division
22	Angusht Nazran (R)	42	3	4	35	32	105	−73	13	Relegation to Second Division

Source: PFL, RSSSF
(P) Promoted; (R) Relegated

== Results ==
Home \ Away	ANG	ANZ	AVA	BAL	DBR	DMK	FAK	KAM	KHI	KUB	LAD	KMV	MET	ORY	SAL	SIB	SKA	SOD	SNN	TER	URA	VOL
Angusht Nazran		2–2	1–4	1–3	1–0	0–4	0–3	0–1	1–1	0–3	3–0	2–3	0–1	1–1	2–4	2–4	1–4	1–2	1–2	2–2	1–3	1–2
Anzhi Makhachkala	2–1		0–1	3–1	1–3	1–2	0–2	1–2	0–2	1–3	3–0	1–2	2–1	2–1	0–0	2–3	2–1	1–1	1–0	0–0	0–2	3–2
Avangard Kursk	2–0	1–1		0–0	2–0	2–1	1–0	2–0	0–1	1–0	1–0	0–1	1–1	1–0	3–1	0–0	1–1	0–1	4–0	3–4	0–0	1–0
Baltika Kaliningrad	2–1	0–1	2–1		0–1	2–1	0–0	2–1	2–4	0–0	2–0	1–1	1–0	2–1	1–0	1–1	0–2	1–3	1–0	1–2	2–2	1–1
Dynamo Bryansk	1–0	1–1	1–0	0–1		1–1	1–0	1–2	0–0	1–0	3–2	2–0	1–0	1–0	1–3	2–1	1–0	0–0	0–0	1–2	0–2	0–0
Dynamo Makhachkala	2–0	2–3	0–0	0–0	1–1		1–0	1–2	2–3	2–1	0–0	0–0	4–0	1–1	3–1	3–2	0–1	1–0	2–1	0–1	1–1	1–2
Fakel Voronezh	4–2	0–2	1–0	0–0	0–2	1–0		0–0	0–0	0–2	1–1	0–0	2–0	0–0	0–2	1–3	0–1	0–2	1–1	2–1	0–5	1–0
KAMAZ	2–1	0–0	2–0	0–0	2–0	1–1	1–0		1–1	1–1	2–1	0–0	3–0	5–0	0–1	0–1	4–1	1–1	2–1	2–0	1–0	1–0
Khimki	2–0	4–3	1–1	4–0	2–0	3–2	3–0	1–0		2–0	2–0	2–0	2–1	2–0	2–1	1–0	1–1	2–0	2–0	3–0	1–1	4–0
Kuban Krasnodar	6–0	1–0	1–0	2–0	3–0	5–2	5–0	2–0	1–1		1–0	7–0	4–0	2–1	3–0	0–0	1–1	1–0	4–2	3–1	0–0	2–1
Lada-Togliatti	3–1	2–0	2–2	4–0	1–0	1–2	1–0	1–0	0–2	0–7		2–1	2–0	1–0	2–0	2–0	0–3	1–1	1–1	0–2	0–2	1–2
Mashuk-KMV Pyatigorsk	1–0	3–2	2–1	3–1	0–1	1–1	1–0	1–0	1–4	0–1	2–1		1–0	1–0	3–0	0–1	0–4	1–0	2–3	1–2	1–3	0–1
Metallurg Krasnoyarsk	2–0	2–3	1–3	3–1	0–0	2–1	0–1	0–2	0–1	1–2	2–2	0–1		2–2	0–2	1–2	0–1	0–4	1–4	1–2	1–1	0–3
Oryol	1–0	1–1	0–1	2–2	0–3	2–7	1–1	1–4	0–3	1–2	1–0	2–1	2–1		1–1	2–1	0–3	1–3	2–1	1–1	0–2	1–0
Salyut-Energia Belgorod	2–0	1–0	0–1	3–2	0–0	3–1	0–0	0–3	1–2	0–3	2–1	2–1	0–4	0–0		1–1	1–0	1–1	1–1	0–0	1–0	2–2
Sibir Novosibirsk	8–0	4–0	1–1	2–0	0–1	4–0	2–0	1–1	1–0	1–3	0–1	3–1	4–1	4–1	3–1		3–1	0–0	2–1	0–1	1–2	1–0
SKA-Khabarovsk	4–0	2–1	1–1	1–2	4–2	2–1	3–0	0–0	1–2	1–3	1–0	0–1	2–1	4–1	2–2	2–0		3–0	0–0	1–0	0–1	2–0
Sodovik Sterlitamak	5–2	1–3	3–1	4–0	1–0	0–0	0–0	0–0	2–2	2–2	3–0	1–0	0–0	1–3	3–0	3–1	2–1		0–0	1–1	0–1	2–0
Spartak Nizhny Novgorod	0–1	2–3	0–0	1–3	1–1	2–1	2–2	0–2	1–3	0–2	4–0	2–2	2–0	0–0	2–3	1–0	2–1	1–3		0–1	1–0	0–0
Terek Grozny	3–0	3–2	1–0	0–1	1–0	0–1	1–3	0–1	2–3	1–2	0–1	0–0	3–0	1–0	0–2	2–0	1–3	0–2	2–2		1–0	0–0
Ural Sverdlovsk Oblast	3–0	2–0	5–0	0–0	2–1	0–0	2–1	2–1	2–1	1–0	2–0	1–0	4–0	1–0	2–0	3–1	2–1	1–1	0–2	2–0		2–1
Volgar-Gazprom	1–0	2–3	1–1	0–0	1–7	1–0	5–0	0–1	2–1	0–1	2–1	2–1	2–0	2–1	2–1	0–0	0–0	1–0	3–0	0–3	1–0	

Source: PFL (in Russian)
Legend: Blue = home team win; Yellow = draw; Red = away team win.

== Top goalscorers ==
Rank	Player	Team	Goals
1	(Russia) Yevgeni Alkhimov	Ural	25
2	(Armenia) Robert Zebelyan	Kuban	23
2	(Russia) Dmitri Akimov	Sibir	23
4	(Russia) Andrey Tikhonov	Khimki	22
5	(Russia) Sergey Samodin	Spartak (NN)	20
6	(Russia) Eduard Zatsepin	Sodovik	19
7	(Russia) Shamil Asildarov	Kuban	18
7	(Russia) Vasili Karmazinenko	SKA-Khabarovsk	18

== See also ==
- 2006 Russian Premier League
