= Nerijus Barasa =

Lithuanian footballer

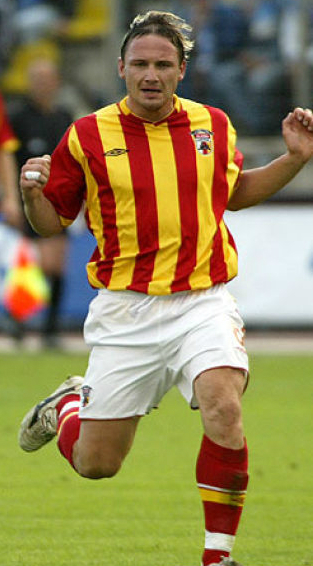

Personal information
- Date of birth: 1 June 1978 (age 48)
- Place of birth: Mažeikiai, Lithuanian SSR, Soviet Union
- Height: 6 ft 0 in (1.83 m)
- Positions: Defensive midfielder; right back

Senior career*
Years	Team	Apps	(Gls)
1994	Mažeikių Romar	6	(0)
1995	Atlantas Klaipėda	1	(0)
1996	Baltika Liepāja	3	(0)
1997–1999	Kareda Šiauliai	50	(3)
2000	FBK Kaunas	23	(2)
2001–2002	Krylia Sovetov Samara	15	(0)
2003	FC Lada Togliatti	13	(0)
2003–2005	FC Alania Vladikavkaz	44	(0)
2005	Krylia Sovetov Samara	4	(0)
2005–2007	FBK Kaunas	0	(0)
2006–2007	→ Hearts (loan)	14	(0)

International career
2001–2006	Lithuania	26	(2)
- * Club domestic league appearances and goals

Nerijus Barasa (born 1 June 1978) is a Lithuanian former professional footballer. He played as a right-back or defensive midfielder.

== Career ==
Barasa started his career with FBK Kaunas in 1994 before joining Atlantas Klaipėda the following season. After a year in Latvia with Baltika Liepāja, he returned to Lithuania with his family, then FBK Kaunas came in for him.

Kaunas beckoned for Barasa in 2001, where he spent the following five seasons; four in the Russian Premier League with FC Krylia Sovetov Samara and FC Alania Vladikavkaz and one in the Russian First Division with FC Lada Togliatti. During this period he was called up to the Lithuanian national team, earning his first cap in 2001.

At the end of the 2005 season, Barasa moved to Scotland, signing for FBK Kaunas, then being immediately loaned to Heart of Midlothian. He joined the Tynecastle side on 13 January 2006 and spent a total of 16 months with the Edinburgh club before moving back to Kaunas.

In October 2006, Barasa was at the centre of controversy when he and compatriot Saulius Mikoliūnas were booed by Hearts fans for perceived poor form in a game against Rangers. This prompted Hearts' Sporting Director Alex Kozlovski to suggest that the supporters had ulterior motives for booing them, expressly their nationality. This claim was contested by fans representative groups and Kozlovski later apologised and retracted it.

Barasa missed half of the 2006–07 season due to injury and left Hearts in the summer of 2007, before also rescinding his contract with Kaunas. After that he retired in order to pursue business interests in Samara, Russia, where he lives with his wife. His last game was against Celtic in the Scottish Premier League on 14 January 2007.

== International goals ==
Scores and results list Lithuania's goal tally first.

#	Date	Venue	Opponent	Score	Result	Competition
1	5 July 2001	Skonto Stadions, Riga, Latvia	Latvia	1–0	1–4	Baltic Cup
2	18 August 2004	Dynamo Stadium, Moscow, Russia	Russia	3–4	3–4	Friendly

== Honours ==
Lithuania

- Baltic Cup: 2005
