= Thiago Maciel =

Brazilian footballer

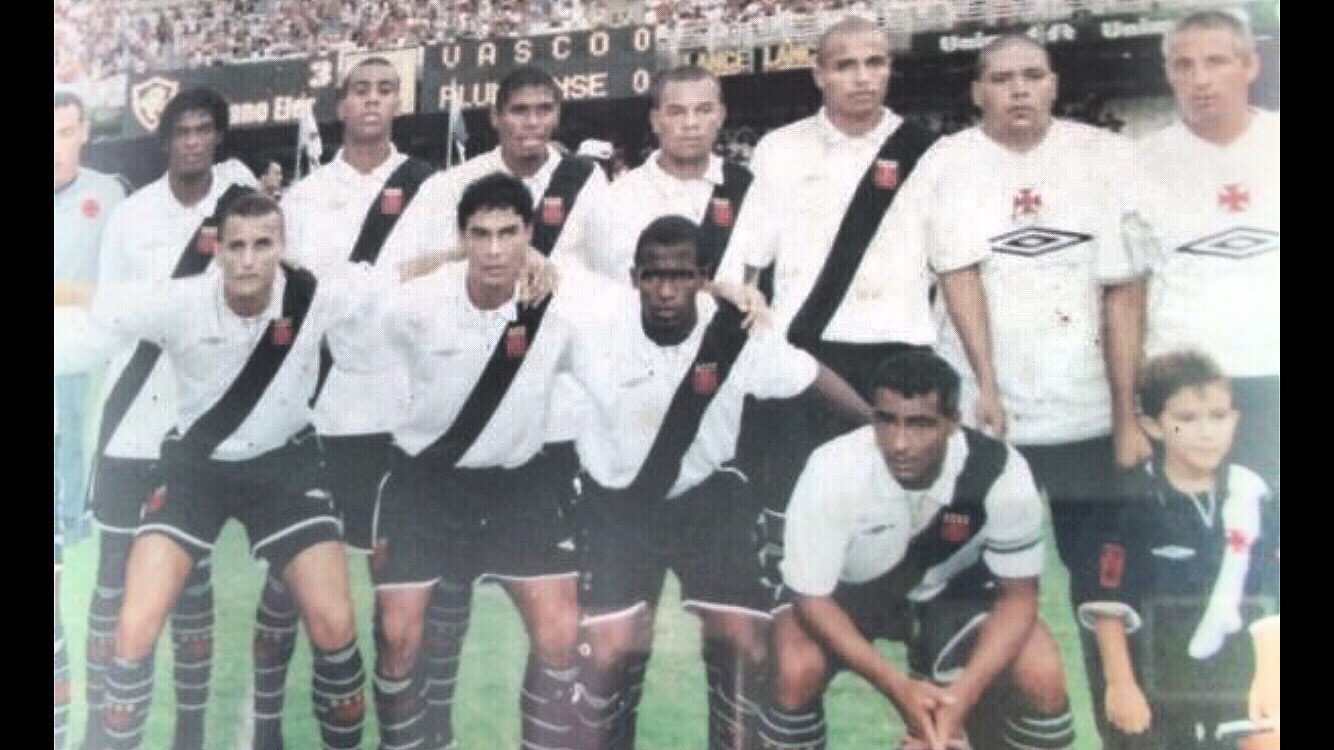
- Maciel (bottom row, center) playing for Vasco

Personal information
- Full name: Thiago Maciel Santiago
- Date of birth: 7 August 1982 (age 44)
- Place of birth: Santana do Livramento, Brazil
- Height: 1.71 m (5 ft 7 in)
- Position: Right back

Youth career
- 2003–2004: Vasco

Senior career*
Years	Team	Apps	(Gls)
2004–2007	Vasco	38	(1)
2004	→ Olaria (loan)		
2005	→ Alania Vladikavkaz (loan)	9	(0)
2008	Tombense	0	(0)
2008	→ Ipatinga (loan)		
2008	→ Macaé (loan)		
2008	Bahia		
2008	Alania	15	(0)
2009	Duque de Caxias		
2009–2010	Macaé		
2010	America	6	(0)
2011	Volta Redonda	0	(0)
2011	Guarani	0	(0)
2012	Ypiranga-RS		
2012	Bonsucesso		
2013–2018	Goytacaz		
- * Club domestic league appearances and goals

Thiago Maciel Santiago or simply Thiago Maciel (born 7 August 1982), is a Brazilian former professional football who played as a right-back.

== Career ==
In the 2008 season, Thiago Maciel signed a three-year contract with Tombense, and he was loaned to Ipatinga in January, Macaé in March before signed for Bahia in June. But in August he returned to Alania Vladikavkaz.

After leaving Alania, in March 2009 he signed for Duque de Caxias. He has never played in a competitive game for them, as his contract was terminated only 15 days later.
