= Giedrius Žutautas =

Lithuanian footballer

Personal information
- Date of birth: 15 March 1974 (age 52)
- Place of birth: Gargždai, Lithuanian SSR, Soviet Union
- Height: 1.85 m (6 ft 1 in)
- Position: Defender

Senior career*
Years	Team	Apps	(Gls)
1992–1993	ROMAR Mažeikiai		
1993–1995	FK Sirijus Klaipėda		
1995–1997	FBK Kaunas	26	(0)
1997	FC KAMAZ-Chally Naberezhnye Chelny	23	(0)
1998	FC Torpedo-ZIL Moscow	5	(0)
1998	PFC Spartak Nalchik	14	(0)
1999	FK Žalgiris Kaunas		
2000–2001	FK Liepājas Metalurgs	20	(0)
2002	Sviesa Vilnius		
2003	Rodovitas Klaipėda		

International career
1996–1999	Lithuania	12	(0)
- * Club domestic league appearances and goals

Giedrius Žutautas (born 15 March 1974, in Gargždai) is a retired Lithuanian professional footballer. He made his professional debut in the A Lyga in 1992 for FK ROMAR Mažeikiai.

His younger brother Darius Žutautas is also a professional footballer.

== Honours ==
Žalgiris Kaunas

- A Lyga: 1999
