= Justice Christopher =

Nigerian footballer (1981–2022)

Personal information
- Full name: Justice Longs Christopher
- Date of birth: 24 December 1981
- Place of birth: Jos, Nigeria
- Date of death: 9 March 2022 (aged 40)
- Place of death: Jos, Nigeria
- Height: 1.81 m (5 ft 11 in)
- Position: Midfielder

Youth career
- 1996–1998: Amazing International FC

Senior career*
Years	Team	Apps	(Gls)
1999	Katsina United		
2000	Sharks		
2001	Bendel Insurance		
2001–2002	Antwerp	14	(1)
2002–2004	Levski Sofia	2	(0)
2004	Trelleborg	13	(0)
2005–2006	Alania Vladikavkaz	7	(0)
2006–2007	Herfølge Boldklub	11	(0)
2012	Nasarawa United		

International career
2001–2002	Nigeria	11	(0)
- * Club domestic league appearances and goals

Justice Longs Christopher (24 December 1981 – 9 March 2022) was a Nigerian professional footballer who played as a midfielder.

== Club career ==
Christopher played for several clubs, including Katsina United, Sharks, Bendel Insurance, Antwerp (Belgium), Levski Sofia (Bulgaria), Trelleborg (Sweden), Alania Vladikavkaz in Russia and Herfølge Boldklub in Denmark.

After the end of the season 2006–07 season he announced his retirement from football.

On 21 October 2012, Christopher announced his comeback and signed for Nasarawa United.

== International career ==
Christopher made a total of 11 appearances for the Nigeria national team and was a participant at the 2002 FIFA World Cup, playing in all three games before the team's group stage elimination.

== Personal life ==
Christopher died on 9 March 2022, at the age of 40, having collapsed at a hotel he owned in Jos, Nigeria.

== Career statistics ==
=== Club ===
Appearances and goals by club, season and competition
Club	Season	League			National cup		League cup		Continental		Total	
Club	Season	Division	Apps	Goals	Apps	Goals	Apps	Goals	Apps	Goals	Apps	Goals
Antwerp	2001–02	First Division	14	1								
Levski Sofia	2002–03	A PFG	2	0								
Levski Sofia	2003–04	A PFG	0	0								
Levski Sofia	Total		2	0								
Trelleborg	2004	Allsvenskan	13	0								
Alania Vladikavkaz	2005	Premier League	7	0								
Alania Vladikavkaz	2006		0	0								
Alania Vladikavkaz	Total		7	0								
Herfølge	2006–07	First Division	11	0								
Career total			47	1								

=== International ===
Appearances and goals by national team and year
National team	Year	Apps	Goals
Nigeria	2001	4	0
Nigeria	2002	7	0
Total		11	0
