= Idan Shum =

Israeli footballer (born 1976)

Personal information
- Date of birth: 26 March 1976 (age 50)
- Place of birth: Kfar Saba, Israel
- Height: 1.87 m (6 ft 2 in)
- Position: Midfielder

Youth career
- Hapoel Kfar Saba

Senior career*
Years	Team	Apps	(Gls)
1993–1996	Hapoel Kfar Saba	32	(3)
1995–1996	→ Hapoel Tzafririm Holon		
1996–1997	Maccabi Haifa	14	(2)
1997–1998	Hapoel Petah Tikva	12	(1)
1998–1999	Hapoel Kfar Saba	22	(0)
1999–2000	Ironi Rishon LeZion	24	(1)
2000–2001	Maccabi Netanya	18	(0)
2001–2002	Hapoel Kfar Saba	31	(6)
2002–2003	Hapoel Haifa		
2003–2005	Maccabi Herzliya	39	(2)
2005	Ironi Rishon LeZion	14	(0)
2005–2006	Alania Vladikavkaz	0	(0)
2006–2011	Hapoel Kfar Saba	85	(3)

International career
1994–1997	Israel U21	18	(0)

Managerial career
- 2021: Hapoel Kfar Saba (Caretaker Manager)
- 2023–: Hapoel Kfar Saba (Caretaker Manager)
- * Club domestic league appearances and goals

Idan Shum (Hebrew: עידן שום; born 26 March 1976) is an Israeli former footballer.
