= Vladislav Lungu =

Moldovan professional footballer (born 1977)

Personal information
- Date of birth: 10 April 1977 (age 49)
- Place of birth: Soviet Union
- Height: 1.81 m (5 ft 11 in)
- Position: Midfielder

Youth career
- FC Zimbru Chișinău

Senior career*
| Years | Team | Apps | (Gls) |
| 1995 | Zimbru Chişinău | 3 | (1) |
| 1996 | Progresul Briceni | 1 | (0) |
| 1996–1997 | Unisport-Auto Chişinău | 26 | (4) |
| 1998 | Vorskla Poltava | 6 | (0) |
| 1998 | → Vorskla-2 Poltava | 7 | (1) |
| 1999 | Prykarpattia Ivano-Frankivsk | 0 | (0) |
| 1999 | → Prykarpattia-2 Ivano-Frankivsk | 2 | (0) |
| 1999–2000 | Adoms Kremenchuk | 17 | (1) |
| 2000–2004 | Celje | 99 | (13) |
| 2004–2005 | Gorica | 12 | (0) |
| 2005 | Alania Vladikavkaz | 2 | (0) |
| 2006 | FC Vaslui | 3 | (0) |
| 2006–2008 | Maribor | 41 | (0) |
| 2008–2009 | Nosta Novotroitsk | 66 | (1) |

International career
| 1999–2004 | Moldova | 9 | (0) |
- * Club domestic league appearances and goals

Vladislav Lungu (born 10 April 1977) is a Moldovan former professional footballer.

== Club career ==
Lungu previously played for FC Vorskla Poltava in Ukraine, Celje, Gorica and Maribor in Slovenia, and FC Vaslui in Romania.

== International career ==
Lungu has made eight appearances for the full Moldova national football team.

== See also ==
- List of NK Maribor players
