= Vladimir Burduli =

Georgian footballer

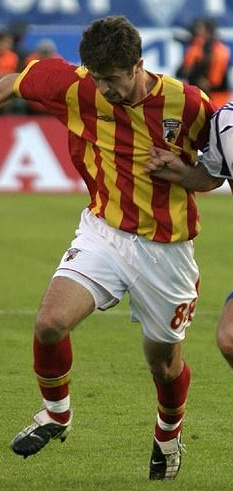

Personal information
- Date of birth: 26 October 1980 (age 46)
- Place of birth: Tbilisi, Soviet Union
- Height: 1.84 m (6 ft 0 in)
- Position: Midfielder

Youth career
- 1995–1997: Dinamo Tbilisi

Senior career*
Years	Team	Apps	(Gls)
1997–2004	Dinamo Tbilisi	111	(22)
1999–2000	→ Tbilisi (loan)	21	(2)
2004	→ Lokomotivi Tbilisi (loan)	10	(1)
2005	Alania Vladikavkaz	14	(0)
2005–2006	Dinamo Tbilisi	12	(4)
2006–2007	Kryvbas Kryvyi Rih	20	(1)
2007–2008	Zorya Luhansk	19	(0)
2008–2010	Tavriya Simferopol	2	(0)
2009	→ Zakarpattia Uzhhorod (loan)	4	(0)
2010	Spartaki Tskhinvali	5	(0)
2010	Neftçi	1	(0)

International career
1999–2001	Georgia U21	14	(1)
2001–2007	Georgia	21	(2)

Managerial career
- 2013–2015: Sioni Bolnisi
- 2015–2016: Sioni Bolnisi (sporting director)
- 2019–2020: Aragvi Dusheti
- 2021–2022: Tbilisi City
- 2023–2026: Meshakhte
- * Club domestic league appearances and goals

Vladimir Burduli (Georgian: ვლადიმერ ბურდული; born 26 October 1980) is a Georgian football manager and a former player who most recently worked as the manager of Meshakhte.

== Playing career ==
Burduli has been capped 21 times for the national team, scoring 2 goals.

He left for Russian side FC Alania Vladikavkaz in 2005.

== Managerial career ==
Burduli worked at Sioni in the middle of the 2010s. In 2014, he led the team to the 3rd league place and the UEFA Europa League qualifying round.

In 2019, 3rd division side Aragvi under his management achieved their first ever promotion to the 2nd league after a play-off victory over Guria.

In 2023, Burduli was appointed at Liga 3 club Meshakhte. During his four-year tenure, he led the team to back-to-back promotions and their first ever participation in a top-league competition.

== Career statistics ==
=== International goals ===
#	Date	Venue	Opponent	Score	Result	Competition
1.	17 April 2002	Lobanovsky Dynamo Stadium, Kyiv, Ukraine	Ukraine	2-1	Lost	Friendly
2.	4 June 2005	Qemal Stafa Stadium, Tirana, Albania	Albania	3-2	Lost	2006 World Cup qual.
Correct as of 7 October 2015

== Honours ==
=== Player ===
Dinamo Tbilisi

- Georgian Premier League (3): 1997–98, 1998–99, 2002–03
- Georgian Cup (2): 2002–03, 2003–04

Lokomotivi Tbilisi

- Georgian Cup (1): 2004–05
