= Vitali Daraselia Jr. =

Georgian footballer

Vitali Daraselia
Personal information
- Date of birth: 27 September 1978 (age 48)
- Place of birth: Tbilisi, Georgian SSR, Soviet Union
- Height: 1.80 m (5 ft 11 in)
- Position: Midfielder

Senior career*
Years	Team	Apps	(Gls)
1995–1997	Dinamo Batumi	6	(2)
1998–2000	CSKA Kyiv	21	(2)
1998–2000	→ CSKA-2 Kyiv (loan)	68	(17)
2000	Systema-Boreks Borodyanka	2	(1)
2001–2004	Dinamo Tbilisi	80	(27)
2004–2005	Alania Vladikavkaz	24	(1)
2005–2006	Dinamo Tbilisi	10	(1)
2006	Shakhter Karagandy	16	(1)
2007	Sioni Bolnisi	5	(3)
2007–2008	Dacia Chişinău	8	(2)
2008–2009	Lokomotivi Tbilisi	20	(3)

International career
2002–2005	Georgia	10	(0)
- * Club domestic league appearances and goals

Vitaly Daraselia (born 27 September 1978), or Vitali Daraselia Jr., is a retired Georgian footballer.

Daraselia Jr. is the son of Vitaly Daraselia, also a footballer.

Daraselia started his career at Dinamo Batumi before cross border for CSKA Kyiv. He was signed by Georgian giant Dinamo Tbilisi after poor season in Kyiv.

In February 2004, he was spotted by Alania Vladikavkaz and played for 2 seasons. In 2005–06 season he returned to Dinamo Tbilisi before left for Shakhter Karagandy in August 2006.

In January 2007 Daraselia returned to Georgia again, for Sioni Bolnisi.

At 2007–08 season he played for Dacia Chişinău before signed by Lokomotivi Tbilisi.

== International career ==
Daraselia received his first call-up in 2002.

== Honours ==
=== Individual ===
- CIS Cup top goalscorer: 2004
