= Darius Žutautas =

Lithuanian footballer (born 1978)

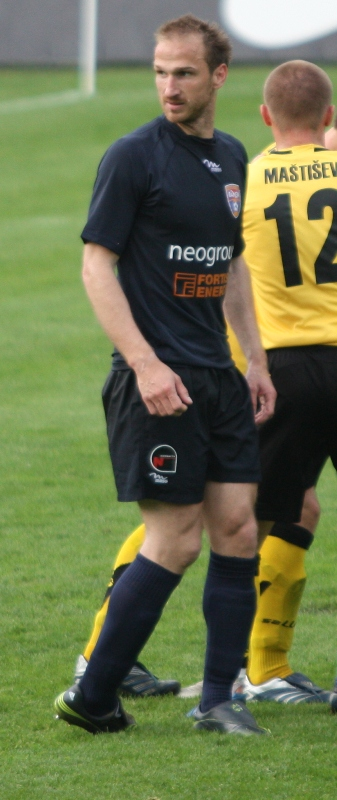

Personal information
- Date of birth: 30 September 1978 (age 48)
- Place of birth: Gargždai, Soviet Union
- Height: 1.91 m (6 ft 3 in)
- Position: Defender

Senior career*
Years	Team	Apps	(Gls)
1994–1996	Banga Gargždai	14	(0)
1996	Panerys Vilnius	10	(0)
1997–1998	Žalgiris	47	(2)
1999–2000	Alania Vladikavkaz	49	(1)
2001–2002	Dinamo Moscow	43	(2)
2003	Rodovitas Klaipėda		
2003	Świt Nowy Dwór Mazowiecki	7	(0)
2004	FBK Kaunas	19	(0)
2005	Alania Vladikavkaz	18	(0)
2006	Atlantas Klaipėda	21	(0)
2006–2007	Khazar Lenkoran	12	(0)
2008	Ventspils	0	(0)
2009–2010	Banga Gargždai	20	(0)
2010	Platanias	17	(0)
2011–2014	Bergsøy IL		

International career
1997–2001	Lithuania	25	(0)
- * Club domestic league appearances and goals

Darius Žutautas (born 30 September 1978) is a Lithuanian former professional footballer. A defender, he stands 1.91 metres (6 ft 3 in) tall and weighs 87 kilograms (192 lb).

== Career ==
Žutautas was an active member of the Lithuanian national team. He has previously played for Banga Gargždai, Žalgiris, Panerys Vilnius, Świt Nowy Dwór Mazowiecki, Dinamo Moscow, Kaunas and Alania Vladikavkaz. After Alania suffered relegation, Žutautas returned to Lithuania and signed a contract with Atlantas Klaipėda until July 2006. In 2010, he moved to Platanias in Greek Gamma Ethniki (Third Division).

He joined Bergsøy IL in 2011, a Norwegian third division team.

=== Coaching ===
He also trains Bergsøy G16, which he really enjoys.

== Personal life ==
His older brother Giedrius Žutautas was also a professional footballer.

== Honours ==
FBK Kaunas

- A Lyga: 2004
- Lithuanian Cup: 2004

Khazar Lankaran

- Azerbaijan Top League: 2006–07
- Azerbaijan Cup: 2006–07
