= Ruslan Alborov =

Russian professional football player

Personal information
- Full name: Ruslan Mikhailovich Alborov
- Date of birth: 13 February 1983 (age 43)
- Height: 1.92 m (6 ft 4 in)
- Position: Forward

Team information
- Current team: FC Alania Vladikavkaz (assistant coach)

Senior career*
Years	Team	Apps	(Gls)
2001–2007	FC Alania Vladikavkaz	40	(3)
2007	FC Gubkin	10	(0)
2008	FC Nizhny Novgorod	0	(0)
2010	FC Alania Oktyabrskoye		
2010	FC Sakhalin Yuzhno-Sakhalinsk	7	(1)
2011–2012	FC Mostovik-Primorye Ussuriysk	33	(6)

Managerial career
- 2022–: FC Alania Vladikavkaz (assistant)
- * Club domestic league appearances and goals

Ruslan Mikhailovich Alborov (Russian: Руслан Михайлович Алборов; born 13 February 1983) is a Russian professional football coach and a former player. He is an assistant coach with FC Alania Vladikavkaz.
