= FC Zvezda Irkutsk =

Zvezda Irkutsk
- Full name: Football Club Zvezda Irkutsk
- Founded: 1957; 68 years ago
- Dissolved: 2008; 17 years ago
- Ground: Trud Stadium, Irkutsk
- Capacity: 16,500
- 2008: Russian First Division, 22nd
Home colours	Away colours

FC Zvezda Irkutsk (Russian: ФК Звезда Иркутск) was a Russian football club based in Irkutsk. Zvezda finished first in the Russian Second Division East in 2006, winning promotion to the Russian First Division. The club previously played in the First Division between 1992 and 1996, or five seasons, with a best result of fourth in the 1995 season.

On October 23, 2008, the club had to stop participation in the Russian First Division due to lack of funds, their main sponsor Interavia airlines was having financial problems at the time.

== Notable past players ==
- (Russia) Denis Glushakov
- (Russia) Vladimir Granat
- (Russia) Yan Ivanin
- (Russia) Alan Kusov
- (Russia) Andrey Yeshchenko
- (Bosnia and Herzegovina) Albin Pelak
- (Ukraine) Boris Konfederat
- (Croatia) Ivan Babić
- (Serbia) Uroš Milošavljević
- (Tajikistan) Rahmatullo Fuzailov
- (Ukraine) Oleksandr Sytnyk
- (Ukraine) Andriy Huz
- (Uzbekistan) Vladimir Shishelov

== See also ==
- FC Baikal Irkutsk
