= Yevgeni Alkhimov =

Russian footballer and official

Personal information
- Full name: Yevgeni Valeryevich Alkhimov
- Date of birth: 11 February 1977 (age 49)
- Place of birth: Chita, Russian SFSR
- Height: 1.82 m (5 ft 11 1/2 in)
- Position: Forward

Team information
- Current team: FC Ural Yekaterinburg (director of sports)

Youth career
- 1984–1993: FC Lokomotiv Chita

Senior career*
Years	Team	Apps	(Gls)
1994–2000	FC Lokomotiv Chita	191	(40)
2001–2002	FC Fakel-Voronezh Voronezh	30	(3)
2002	FC Lokomotiv Chita	15	(3)
2003	FC Fakel-Voronezh Voronezh	25	(8)
2004–2005	FC Lokomotiv Chita	82	(38)
2006–2008	FC Ural Yekaterinburg	80	(31)
2008	FC Salyut-Energia Belgorod	22	(12)
2009	FC SKA-Energiya Khabarovsk	33	(6)
2010	FC Volgar-Gazprom Astrakhan	9	(0)
2010	FC Sokol Saratov	11	(3)
2011–2013	FC Chita	42	(19)

Managerial career
- 2016–2017: FC Chita (director)
- 2017–: FC Ural Yekaterinburg (director of sports)
- * Club domestic league appearances and goals

Yevgeni Valeryevich Alkhimov (Russian: Евгений Валерьевич Алхимов; born 11 February 1977) is a Russian professional football official and a former player. He is the director of sports for FC Ural Yekaterinburg, where he played from 2006 to 2008.

== Playing career ==
He made his debut in the Russian Premier League in 2001 for FC Fakel Voronezh.

He is the best Russian Football National League scorer ever.

== Honours ==
- Russian First Division top scorer: 2005 (24 goals), 2006 (25 goals).
