= FC Spartak Nizhny Novgorod =

Spartak
- Full name: Football Club; Spartak Nizhny Novgorod
- Founded: 2000
- Dissolved: 2007
- Ground: Lokomotiv Stadium, Nizhny Novgorod
- Capacity: 17,856
- Chairman: Yury Pervak
- Manager: Dmitry Galyamin
- 2006: Russian First Division, 18th
| Home colours | Away colours |

FC Spartak Nizhny Novgorod was a Russian football club based in Nizhny Novgorod.

== History ==
The club was founded as Lukoil Chelyabinsk in 2000. The futsal club Chelyabinets became the base for the club. Yury Pervak, the CEO of Lukoil Chelyabinsk, played a major role in the establishment. In 2001 Lukoil became the champions of one of the zones in the amateur league (KFK) and were promoted to the Second Division. In 2002 Lukoil finished third in the Ural zone of the Second Division. In 2003 and 2004 they continued bidding for the championship, both times finishing as runners-up. Exclusion of some clubs from the First Division opened the way up for Lukoil, and they accepted promotion, adopting the new name of Spartak. In 2005 Spartak finished ninth in the First Division.

In 2006 the club moved to Nizhny Novgorod. They finished 18th in the league and were relegated.
