= FC Spartak Vladikavkaz (2008) =

Russian football club

- Full name: Football Club Spartak Vladikavkaz
- Founded: 1992; 34 years ago
- Dissolved: 2009; 17 years ago
- League: Amateur Football League, Zone South
- 2008: 14th

FC Spartak Vladikavkaz (Russian: «Спартак» (Владикавказ)) was a Russian football team from Vladikavkaz. It should not be confused with former Russian Premier League champions FC Alania Vladikavkaz, who were known as FC Spartak Vladikavkaz for several periods in their history. FC Spartak Vladikavkaz played professionally from 1993 to 2000; their best result was fourth place in Zone 1 of the Russian Second Division in 1993.

== Team name history ==
- 1992: FC Stroitel Vladikavkaz
- 1993–2000: FC Iriston Vladikavkaz
- 2001–2007: FC Vladikavkaz
- 2008: FC Spartak Vladikavkaz
