= FC Avtodor Vladikavkaz =

- Full name: Football Club Avtodor Vladikavkaz
- Founded: 1983; 42 years ago
- Dissolved: 2011; 14 years ago
- Ground: Tedeyev SOK Stadium
- Capacity: 3,000
- League: Russian Second Division, Zone South
- 2010: 16th
| Home colours | Away colours |

FC Avtodor Vladikavkaz (Russian: ФК «Автодор» Владикавказ) was a Russian association football club from Vladikavkaz, founded in 1983. It first played on the professional level in 1990. The highest level it ever achieved was Russian First Division where it played in 1993 and 1994. From 1992 to 1994 the club was called FC Avtodor-Olaf Vladikavkaz and in 1995 it was called FC Avtodor-BMK Vladikavkaz.

In early 2011, it failed licensing for the Russian Second Division due to high debts.

== Notable players ==
- Vladimir Kaloyev, forward/midfielder
