= FC Chita =

Russian football club

Chita
- Full name: Football Club Chita
- Founded: 1984; 42 years ago
- Ground: Lokomotiv Stadium, Chita
- Capacity: 10,200
- Chairman: Aleksei Tikhonkikh
- League: Amateur Football League Zone Siberia
Home colours	Away colours	Third colours

FC Chita is a Russian football club based in Chita. The club was founded in 1984 as a result of reorganization of FC Lokomotiv Chita which was excluded from the First Division. FC Chita was admitted to the Second Division.

== History ==
=== Before 1974 ===
Chita was first represented in the Soviet league in 1937, when DKA played in Group D. After one more occasional appearance in 1946 (by Dynamo), the city was represented in the league since 1957. Many different names were used for the Chita team:

- DKA before 1945
- Dynamo in 1946–1956
- OSK in 1957
- SKVO in 1957–1959
- SKA in 1960 and 1967–1973
- Zabaykalets in 1961–1966

The best league result was SKA's victory in zone 6 in 1967 and their 7th position in subsequent Class B final tournament.

=== Lokomotiv ===
In 1974 FC Lokomotiv Chita was founded. Sources disagree on whether Lokomotiv is a continuation of previous Chita clubs. Lokomotiv played in the Soviet Second League in 1974–1977 and in 1984–1991.

After the dissolution of USSR, Lokomotiv entered the Russian First Division. They played there until 2005. Lokomotiv's best results were 3rd position in the Eastern zone in 1992 and 8th position in the nationwide league in 1995, 1997, and 2000. Lokomotiv were the only club which stayed in the First Division for the first 14 years of its existence.

=== 2006 exclusion ===
On 14 February 2006 Lokomotiv and Alania Vladikavkaz were denied professional licences by Professional Football League and excluded from professional football for juridical irregularities. On 22 February PFL decided to replace Alania and Lokomotiv with Lada Togliatti and Mashuk-KMV Pyatigorsk, the runners-up in the Second Division. The Russian Football Union did not endorse the exclusion and on 28 February decided to keep Alania and Lokomotiv in the First Division, giving them another chance to fulfill the league requirements. Consequently, on 6 March PFL decided to extend the First Division from 22 to 24 clubs, including Alania, Lokomotiv, Lada, and Mashuk-KMV.

However, on 20 March the Russian Football Union finally decided to exclude Alania and Lokomotiv from the league. This decision was announced by the Professional Football League on 21 March, five days before the start of the First Division.

Lokomotiv underwent reorganization, were renamed FC Chita and on 4 April were admitted into the Russian Second Division. FC Chita won the East (Vostok) Zone of the Second Division in 2008 and played in the Russian First Division in 2009 season. However, FC Chita relegated again to Second Division after finishing First Division as 17th.

At the end of the 2016–17 season, FC Chita secured the top spot in their zone of the Russian Professional Football League, but did not apply for the second-tier Russian Football National League license for the next season due to lack of financing, effectively refusing to be promoted.

Before the 2022–23 season, the club announced it will voluntarily drop out of professional competitions and will play on amateur level.

== Notable players ==
Had international caps for their respective countries. Players whose name is listed in bold represented their countries while playing for Chita.

Russia

- (Russia) Yan Ivanin
- (Russia) Igor Smolnikov

Former USSR countries

- (Uzbekistan) Victor Karpenko
- (Kazakhstan) Andrey Morev
