= 2007 Russian Second Division =

Russian Second Division
- Season: 2007

The 2007 Russian Second Division was the third strongest Division in Russian football. The Second Division is geographically divided into 5 zones. The winners of each zone are automatically promoted into the First Division. The bottom finishers of each zone lose professional status and are relegated into the Amateur Football League.

== South ==
=== Standings ===
Pos	Team	Pld	W	D	L	GF	GA	GD	Pts	Promotion or relegation
1	Chernomorets Novorossiysk (C, P)	28	21	4	3	68	25	+43	67	Promotion to First Division
2	Dynamo Stavropol	28	17	5	6	47	28	+19	56	
3	Bataysk-2007	28	16	7	5	46	28	+18	55	
4	Rotor Volgograd	28	16	5	7	56	29	+27	53	
5	Druzhba Maykop	28	15	6	7	39	32	+7	51	
6	Kavkaztransgaz-2005 Ryzdvyany	28	14	4	10	40	37	+3	46	
7	Taganrog	28	13	4	11	40	32	+8	43	
8	Krasnodar-2000	28	12	5	11	38	31	+7	41	
9	Sochi-04	28	9	7	12	35	39	−4	34	
10	Olimpia Volgograd	28	9	6	13	30	46	−16	33	
11	Sudostroitel Astrakhan	28	8	4	16	24	38	−14	28	
12	Torpedo Volzhsky	28	8	4	16	34	43	−9	28	
13	Avtodor Vladikavkaz	28	6	7	15	28	48	−20	25	
14	Spartak-UGP Anapa	28	5	4	19	22	48	−26	19	
15	Tekstilshchik Kamyshin (R)	28	3	4	21	15	58	−43	13	Relegation to Amateur Football League

Source: PFL
Rules for classification: 1st points; 2nd matches won; 3rd head-to-head (points, matches won, goal difference, goals scored, away goals scored); 4th goal difference; 5th goals scored; 6th away goals scored
(C) Champions; (P) Promoted; (R) Relegated

=== Top scorers ===
22 goals

- Karen Sargsyan (FC Dynamo Stavropol)

17 goals

- Ivan Luzhnikov (FC Chernomorets Novorossiysk)

16 goals

- Vladimir Shipilov (FC Chernomorets Novorossiysk)

14 goals

- Vladimir Serov (FC Rotor Volgograd)
- Georgi Smurov (FC Taganrog)

13 goals

- Ivan Grinyuk (FC Bataysk-2007)
- Dmitry Mezinov (FC Bataysk-2007)

12 goals

- Zhumaldin Karatlyashev (FC Kavkaztransgaz-2005 Ryzdvyany)
- Ilya Kokorev (FC Sochi-04)

11 goals

- Mikhail Surshkov (FC Druzhba Maykop)

== West ==
=== Standings ===
Pos	Team	Pld	W	D	L	GF	GA	GD	Pts	Promotion or relegation
1	Sportakademklub Moscow (C, P)	30	16	9	5	39	25	+14	57	Promotion to First Division
2	Sheksna Cherepovets	30	15	8	7	50	33	+17	53	
3	Dynamo St. Petersburg	30	14	11	5	47	27	+20	53	
4	Torpedo Vladimir	30	15	7	8	44	27	+17	52	
5	Spartak Kostroma	31	15	5	11	34	25	+9	50	
6	Reutov	30	14	6	10	41	33	+8	48	
7	Zenit-2 St. Petersburg	30	12	5	13	45	48	−3	41	
8	Spartak Shchyolkovo	30	12	3	15	29	39	−10	39	
9	Torpedo-RG Moscow	30	10	8	12	36	41	−5	38	
10	Volochanin-Ratmir Vyshny Volochyok	30	9	9	12	32	42	−10	36	
11	Nara-Desna Naro-Fominsk	30	8	12	10	27	33	−6	36	
12	Zelenograd	30	9	7	14	36	36	0	34	
13	Dynamo Vologda	30	8	9	13	30	34	−4	33	
14	Volga Tver	30	7	11	12	28	39	−11	32	
15	Baltika-2 Kaliningrad	30	10	1	19	29	49	−20	31	
16	Smolensk (R)	30	8	6	16	29	45	−16	30	Relegation to Amateur Football League

Source: PFL
Rules for classification: 1st points; 2nd matches won; 3rd head-to-head (points, matches won, goal difference, goals scored, away goals scored); 4th goal difference; 5th goals scored; 6th away goals scored
(C) Champions; (P) Promoted; (R) Relegated

=== Top scorers ===
16 goals

- Aleksei Baranov (FC Torpedo-RG Moscow)

14 goals

- Maksim Protserov (FC Spartak Shchyolkovo)
- Ruslan Suanov (FC Dynamo St. Petersburg / FC Sportakademklub Moscow)

13 goals

- Ruslan Elderkhanov (FC Reutov)

11 goals

- Maksim Andreyev (FC Zenit-2 St. Petersburg)

10 goals

- Grigory Gnedov (FC Sheksna Cherepovets)
- Azamat Gonezhukov (FC Nara-Desna Naro-Fominsk)
- Dmitry Kalinin (FC Sheksna Cherepovets)
- Valeri Malyshev (FC Torpedo Vladimir)

9 goals

- Igor Vekovishchev (FC Zelenograd)
- Sergei Rodin (FC Sportakademklub Moscow)
- Artur Sarkisov (FC Reutov)

== Center ==
=== Standings ===
Pos	Team	Pld	W	D	L	GF	GA	GD	Pts	Promotion or relegation
1	Vityaz Podolsk (C, P)	30	24	5	1	59	15	+44	77	Promotion to First Division
2	Metallurg Lipetsk	30	20	7	3	74	29	+45	67	
3	Lukhovitsy	30	19	4	7	50	28	+22	61	
4	Ryazan	30	18	7	5	51	19	+32	61	
5	Gubkin	30	16	1	13	35	33	+2	49	
6	Yelets	30	15	4	11	39	31	+8	49	
7	Lobnya-Alla	30	11	6	13	41	38	+3	39	
8	Dynamo Voronezh	30	11	4	15	35	43	−8	37	
9	Zenit Penza	30	10	7	13	31	32	−1	37	
10	Spartak Tambov	30	10	6	14	33	37	−4	36	
11	Saturn Yegoryevsk	30	10	5	15	31	40	−9	35	
12	Znamya Truda Orekhovo-Zuyevo	30	9	7	14	30	36	−6	34	
13	Nika Moscow	30	9	1	20	28	53	−25	28	
14	Zvezda Serpukhov	30	7	6	17	26	58	−32	27	
15	Lokomotiv Liski	30	7	5	18	30	56	−26	26	
16	Don Novomoskovsk (R)	30	4	5	21	16	61	−45	17	Relegation to Amateur Football League

Source: PFL
Rules for classification: 1st points; 2nd matches won; 3rd head-to-head (points, matches won, goal difference, goals scored, away goals scored); 4th goal difference; 5th goals scored; 6th away goals scored
(C) Champions; (P) Promoted; (R) Relegated

=== Top scorers ===
17 goals

- Denis Zhukovskiy (FC Metallurg Lipetsk)

15 goals

- Roman Grigoryan (FC Vityaz Podolsk)

12 goals

- Sergei Anokhin (FC Vityaz Podolsk)
- Vladislav Mayorov (FC Ryazan)

11 goals

- Aleksei Antonnikov (FC Lukhovitsy)
- Vladimir Konstantinov (FC Lokomotiv Liski)
- Aleksandr Kutyin (FC Yelets)

10 goals

- Dmitri Bayda (FC Metallurg Lipetsk)
- Dmitri Chesnokov (FC Vityaz Podolsk)
- Andrei Meshchaninov (FC Saturn Yegoryevsk / FC Zvezda Serpukhov)
- Fyodor Milovanov (FC Dynamo Voronezh)
- Rafael Zangionov (FC Metallurg Lipetsk)

== Ural-Povolzhye ==
=== Standings ===
Pos	Team	Pld	W	D	L	GF	GA	GD	Pts	Promotion or relegation
1	Volga Ulyanovsk (C, P)	26	17	4	5	37	22	+15	55	Promotion to First Division
2	Gazovik Orenburg	26	16	6	4	46	23	+23	54	
3	Zenit Chelyabinsk	26	16	3	7	44	20	+24	51	
4	Volga Nizhny Novgorod	26	15	5	6	52	30	+22	50	
5	Dynamo Kirov	26	12	3	11	38	40	−2	39	
6	Krylya Sovetov-SOK Dimitrovgrad	26	12	2	12	54	45	+9	38	
7	Lada-Togliatti	26	11	3	12	27	32	−5	36	
8	Alnas Almetyevsk	26	11	2	13	32	36	−4	35	
9	Tyumen	26	10	4	12	35	36	−1	34	
10	SOYUZ-Gazprom Izhevsk	26	8	8	10	41	33	+8	32	
11	Yunit Samara	26	9	4	13	31	42	−11	31	
12	Sokol-Saratov	26	9	3	14	22	34	−12	30	
13	Neftekhimik Nizhnekamsk	26	7	4	15	29	50	−21	25	
14	Rubin-2 Kazan	26	2	3	21	11	56	−45	9	

Source: PFL
Rules for classification: 1st points; 2nd matches won; 3rd head-to-head (points, matches won, goal difference, goals scored, away goals scored); 4th goal difference; 5th goals scored; 6th away goals scored
(C) Champions; (P) Promoted

=== Top scorers ===
17 goals

- Dmitri Ryzhov (FC Krylia Sovetov-SOK Dimitrovgrad)

15 goals

- Vladimir Morozov (FC Zenit Chelyabinsk)

14 goals

- Mikhail Tyufyakov (FC Dynamo Kirov)

12 goals

- Marat Shogenov (FC Gazovik Orenburg)
- Dmitri Zarva (FC Tyumen)

11 goals

- Konstantin Kaynov (FC Lada Togliatti / FC Volga Nizhny Novgorod)

10 goals

- Sergei Yevin (FC Lada Togliatti / FC Volga Ulyanovsk)

9 goals

- Dmitri Bushmanov (FC Zenit Chelyabinsk)
- Sergei Perednya (FC Volga Nizhny Novgorod)

8 goals

- Valeri Lobanovskiy (FC Zenit Chelyabinsk)
- Stanislav Prokofyev (FC Tyumen)
- Maksim Samoylov (FC SOYUZ-Gazprom Izhevsk)

== East ==
=== Standings ===
Pos	Team	Pld	W	D	L	GF	GA	GD	Pts	Promotion or relegation
1	Dynamo Barnaul (C, P)	30	19	6	5	67	17	+50	63	Promotion to First Division
2	Amur Blagoveshchensk	30	18	6	6	46	20	+26	60	
3	Chita	30	16	8	6	47	20	+27	56	
4	Smena Komsomolsk-na-Amure	30	13	10	7	33	29	+4	49	
5	Irtysh-1946 Omsk	30	12	11	7	43	31	+12	47	
6	Metallurg Krasnoyarsk	30	13	7	10	45	40	+5	46	
7	Okean Nakhodka	30	11	7	12	36	36	0	40	
8	Sibiryak Bratsk	30	7	7	16	32	36	−4	28	
9	Sakhalin Yuzhno-Sakhalinsk	30	6	7	17	21	49	−28	25	
10	Zarya Leninsk-Kuznetsky	30	4	9	17	20	55	−35	21	
11	Shakhtyor Prokopyevsk (R)	30	6	2	22	23	66	−43	20	Relegation to Amateur Football League

Source: PFL
Rules for classification: 1st points; 2nd matches won; 3rd head-to-head (points, matches won, goal difference, goals scored, away goals scored); 4th goal difference; 5th goals scored; 6th away goals scored
(C) Champions; (P) Promoted; (R) Relegated

=== Top scorers ===
19 goals

- Yevgeni Ragoza (FC Dynamo Barnaul)

14 goals

- Aleksei Tikhonkikh (FC Chita)

12 goals

- Anton Bagayev (FC Irtysh-1946 Omsk)
- Yevgeni Nosov (FC Smena Komsomolsk-na-Amure)
- Anton Sidelnikov (FC Chita)

11 goals

- Vladislav Aksyutenko (FC Dynamo Barnaul)
- Nikolai Sergiyenko (FC Amur Blagoveshchensk)

9 goals

- Aleksei Bazanov (FC Metallurg Krasnoyarsk)

8 goals

- Yevgeni Kachan (FC Metallurg Krasnoyarsk)
- Andrei Smyshlyayev (FC Sibiryak Bratsk)
- Vitali Trofimov (FC Zarya Leninsk-Kuznetsky)
