= 2011–12 Russian Second Division =

Russian Second Division
- Season: 2011–12

The 2011–12 Russian Second Division was the third strongest division in Russian football. The Second Division is geographically divided into 5 zones. The winners of each zone are automatically promoted into the First Division. The bottom finishers of each zone lose professional status and are relegated into the Amateur Football League.

== West ==
=== Standings ===
Pos	Team	Pld	W	D	L	GF	GA	GD	Pts	Promotion or relegation
1	Petrotrest St. Petersburg (C, P)	45	27	12	6	80	27	+53	93	Promotion to Football National League
2	Spartak Kostroma	45	26	11	8	62	30	+32	89	
3	Tekstilshchik Ivanovo	45	26	11	8	68	26	+42	89	
4	Dnepr Smolensk	45	24	12	9	77	36	+41	84	
5	Lokomotiv-2 Moscow	45	24	9	12	72	44	+28	81	
6	Volga Tver	45	22	11	12	60	35	+25	77	
7	Pskov-747 Pskov	45	21	10	14	61	53	+8	73	
8	Sheksna Cherepovets (R)	45	20	7	18	51	49	+2	67	Excluded from professional football
9	Istra (R)	45	16	16	13	54	47	+7	64	Excluded from professional football
10	Dynamo Vologda (R)	45	15	15	15	62	63	−1	60	Excluded from professional football
11	Sever Murmansk	45	15	7	23	62	77	−15	52	
12	Karelia Petrozavodsk	45	13	10	22	58	83	−25	49	
13	Saturn Moscow Oblast (R)	45	13	9	23	54	78	−24	48	Excluded from professional football
14	Dynamo Kostroma (R)	45	6	11	28	33	73	−40	29	Excluded from professional football
15	Znamya Truda Orekhovo-Zuyevo	45	4	9	32	29	99	−70	21	
16	Volochanin-Ratmir Vyshny Volochyok (R)	45	4	8	33	26	89	−63	20	Relegation to Amateur Football League

Source: rfspro.ru
Rules for classification: 1st points; 2nd matches won; 3rd head-to-head (points, matches won, goal difference, goals scored, away goals scored); 4th goal difference; 5th goals scored; 6th away goals scored
(C) Champions; (P) Promoted; (R) Relegated

=== Top scorers ===
Source: rfspro.ru (in Russian)

20 goals

- Viktor Svistunov (Petrotrest)

18 goals

- Azamat Kurachinov (Sheksna)

17 goals

- Dmitri Vakulich (Karelia)

16 goals

- Aleksei Antonnikov (Volga)
- Fyodor Pronkov (Saturn)

15 goals

- Murat Khotov (Dnepr / Petrotrest)

== Center ==
=== Standings ===
Pos	Team	Pld	W	D	L	GF	GA	GD	Pts	Promotion or relegation
1	Salyut Belgorod (C, P)	39	25	8	6	78	31	+47	83	Promotion to Football National League
2	Avangard Kursk	39	21	7	11	62	36	+26	70	
3	Vityaz Podolsk	39	18	8	13	58	59	−1	62	
4	Metallurg-Oskol Stary Oskol	39	17	8	14	51	50	+1	59	
5	Lokomotiv Liski	39	16	10	13	47	41	+6	58	
6	Gubkin	39	16	10	13	43	38	+5	58	
7	Metallurg Lipetsk	39	16	8	15	55	53	+2	56	
8	Rusichi Oryol	39	14	11	14	52	60	−8	53	
9	Kaluga	39	14	10	15	37	41	−4	52	
10	Sokol Saratov	39	13	13	13	56	55	+1	52	
11	Spartak Tambov	39	11	10	18	46	58	−12	43	
12	Zvezda Ryazan	39	11	9	19	44	60	−16	42	
13	Podolye Podolsky district	39	9	8	22	33	56	−23	35	
14	Zenit Penza	39	8	8	23	22	46	−24	32	

Source: rfspro.ru
Rules for classification: 1st points; 2nd matches won; 3rd head-to-head (points, matches won, goal difference, goals scored, away goals scored); 4th goal difference; 5th goals scored; 6th away goals scored
(C) Champions; (P) Promoted

=== Top scorers ===
Source: rfspro.ru (in Russian)

20 goals

- Aleksandr Kutyin (Metallurg)

18 goals

- Yevgeni Polyakov (Rusichi)
- Denis Tkachuk (Salyut)

17 goals

- Ivan Rodin (Vityaz)
- Karen Sargsyan (Avangard)

16 goals

- Georgi Smurov (Sokol)

14 goals

- Amir Bazhev (Salyut)

== South ==
=== Standings ===
Pos	Team	Pld	W	D	L	GF	GA	GD	Pts	Promotion or relegation
1	Rotor Volgograd (C, P)	34	24	7	3	67	16	+51	79	Promotion to Football National League
2	Armavir	34	22	6	6	53	21	+32	72	
3	Slavyansky Slavyansk-na-Kubani	34	18	10	6	47	24	+23	64	
4	Mashuk-KMV Pyatigorsk	34	18	5	11	43	33	+10	59	
5	Dagdizel Kaspiysk	34	17	8	9	45	28	+17	59	
6	Astrakhan	34	17	5	12	64	49	+15	56	
7	Angusht Nazran	34	15	5	14	48	46	+2	50	
8	Dynamo Stavropol (R)	34	15	4	15	51	41	+10	49	Excluded from professional football
9	MITOS Novocherkassk	34	13	9	12	48	42	+6	48	
10	Kavkaztransgaz-2005 Ryzdvyany	34	12	9	13	39	39	0	45	
11	FAYUR Beslan (R)	34	11	8	15	41	59	−18	41	Excluded from professional football
12	Druzhba Maykop	34	10	11	13	42	44	−2	41	
13	Taganrog	34	10	7	17	40	51	−11	37	
14	Olimpia Gelendzhik (R)	34	10	4	20	37	56	−19	34	Excluded from professional football
15	Biolog-Novokubansk	34	7	12	15	32	40	−8	33	
16	Energiya Volzhsky	34	9	5	20	35	68	−33	32	
17	Alania-d Vladikavkaz	34	9	3	22	29	71	−42	30	
18	SKA Rostov-on-Don	34	8	4	22	26	59	−33	28	

Source: rfspro.ru
Rules for classification: 1st points; 2nd matches won; 3rd head-to-head (points, matches won, goal difference, goals scored, away goals scored); 4th goal difference; 5th goals scored; 6th away goals scored
(C) Champions; (P) Promoted; (R) Relegated

=== Top scorers ===
Source: rfspro.ru (in Russian)

19 goals

- Mikhail Biryukov (Astrakhan)

16 goals

- Artyom Maslevskiy (Taganrog)

15 goals

- Valeri Basiyev (Olimpia)

13 goals

- Dmitry Mezinov (MITOS)
- Denis Pavlov (Torpedo)
- Timirlan Shavanov (Dagdizel)

11 goals

- Magomed Guguyev (Angusht)
- Rustam Khabekirov (Druzhba)
- Aslanbek Konov (Kavkaztransgaz-2005)
- Sergei Verkashanskiy (Torpedo)
- Ruslan Zyazikov (Angusht)

== Ural-Povolzhye ==
=== Standings ===
Pos	Team	Pld	W	D	L	GF	GA	GD	Pts	Promotion or relegation
1	Neftekhimik Nizhnekamsk (C, P)	39	26	8	5	68	25	+43	86	Promotion to Football National League
2	Ufa (P)	39	25	11	3	54	19	+35	86	Promotion to Football National League
3	Volga Ulyanovsk	39	22	7	10	54	31	+23	73	
4	Akademiya Togliatti	39	19	8	12	61	36	+25	65	
5	Chelyabinsk	39	17	13	9	42	28	+14	64	
6	Tyumen	39	17	12	10	52	35	+17	63	
7	Gornyak Uchaly	39	14	16	9	57	45	+12	58	
8	Syzran-2003	39	13	10	16	42	48	−6	49	
9	Khimik Dzerzhinsk	39	13	9	17	41	52	−11	48	
10	Zenit-Izhevsk	39	12	10	17	50	52	−2	46	
11	Oktan Perm	39	12	5	22	44	65	−21	41	
12	Rubin-2 Kazan	39	7	8	24	32	57	−25	29	
13	Dynamo Kirov	39	5	11	23	23	64	−41	26	
14	Nosta Novotroitsk	39	3	8	28	19	82	−63	17	

Source: rfspro.ru
Rules for classification: 1st points; 2nd matches won; 3rd head-to-head (points, matches won, goal difference, goals scored, away goals scored); 4th goal difference; 5th goals scored; 6th away goals scored
(C) Champions; (P) Promoted

=== Top scorers ===
Source: rfspro.ru (in Russian)

25 goals

- Aleksandr Korotayev (Akademiya)

17 goals

- Aleksei Sapogov (Gornyak)

16 goals

- Yuri Budylin (Neftekhimik)

11 goals

- Anton Bobylev (Volga)
- Ruslan Galiakberov (Rubin-2)

10 goals

- Aleksei Kotlyarov (Neftekhimik)
- Oleg Makeyev (Khimik)

== East ==
=== Standings ===
Pos	Team	Pld	W	D	L	GF	GA	GD	Pts	Promotion or relegation
1	Metallurg-Kuzbass Novokuznetsk (C, P)	36	24	6	6	64	24	+40	78	Promotion to Football National League
2	Mostovik-Primorye Ussuriysk (R)	36	19	6	11	54	31	+23	63	Excluded from professional football
3	Chita	36	17	8	11	49	33	+16	59	
4	Irtysh Omsk	36	16	9	11	52	38	+14	57	
5	Dynamo Barnaul	36	14	14	8	54	41	+13	56	
6	Sakhalin Yuzhno-Sakhalinsk	36	15	8	13	40	41	−1	53	
7	Radian-Baikal Irkutsk	36	13	13	10	42	37	+5	52	
8	Smena Komsomolsk-na-Amure	36	12	15	9	47	30	+17	51	
9	KUZBASS Kemerovo (R)	36	12	6	18	34	40	−6	42	Excluded from professional football
10	Sibiryak Bratsk	36	11	7	18	43	62	−19	40	
11	Amur-2010 Blagoveshchensk	36	9	11	16	30	45	−15	38	
12	Yakutiya Yakutsk	36	7	8	21	38	76	−38	29	
13	Sibir-2 Novosibirsk	36	5	9	22	31	80	−49	24	

Source: rfspro.ru
Rules for classification: 1st points; 2nd matches won; 3rd head-to-head (points, matches won, goal difference, goals scored, away goals scored); 4th goal difference; 5th goals scored; 6th away goals scored
(C) Champions; (P) Promoted; (R) Relegated

=== Top scorers ===
Source: rfspro.ru (in Russian)

18 goals

- Sergei Vinogradov (Sakhalin)

16 goals

- Yevgeni Alkhimov (Chita)
- Vyacheslav Kirillov (Sibiryak / Metallurg-Kuzbass)

13 goals

- Andrei Lodis (Smena)
- Ivan Shpakov (Metallurg-Kuzbass)

10 goals

- Aleksandr Golubev (Metallurg-Kuzbass)
- Andrei Volgin (Metallurg-Kuzbass)

9 goals

- Anton Bagayev (Irtysh)
- Aleksandr Bulanovskiy (Yakutiya)
- Ivan Goryunov (Dynamo)
- Aleksei Sabanov (Sibiryak)
- Yevgeni Shcherbakov (Chita / Irtysh)
- Maksim Zhitnev (Sibir-2)

== Team names ==
In the Russian sports tradition, each team has a proper name written in parentheses followed by the indication of the city it represents in brackets: "Spartak" (Moscow), rather than Moscow Spartak, as would be in the English-language tradition. In English, the parentheses and brackets are usually omitted. Further, while North American team names normally use the plural (Chicago Bulls), Russian team names are usually singular. The names tend to reflect the imagined profession of the team players (or rather their fans, like with Edmonton Oilers), or refer to a geographical object related to the city the team represents (usually, a river or a mountain range), or to one of the former Russian-wide sports associations (Spartak, Dynamo etc.), or else to the sponsoring corporation. Below is the list of Second Division teams with their names translated:

Akademiya (Togliatti)	= Academy, team of the Konoplyov football academy in Togliatti
Alania-d (Vladikavkaz)	refers to North Ossetia (Alania) Republic. Second team of Alania Vladikavkaz; "D" stand for dubl = alternate;
Amur-2010 (Blagoveshchensk)	refers to the Amur River
Angusht (Nazran)	= Ingushetia Republic, in the Ingush language
Astrakhan	
Avangard (Kursk)	= Vanguard
Biolog (Novokubansk)	= Biologist, reflects sponsorship by the Armavir Biological Factory
Chelyabinsk	city name
Chita	city name
Dagdizel (Kaspiysk)	refers to the sponsoring corporation, an acronym literally translated as "the Dagestan diesel engines factory"
Dnepr (Smolensk)	refers to the Dnieper river
Druzhba (Maykop)	= Friendship
Dynamo (Barnaul)	see Dynamo Sports Club
Dynamo (Kirov)	
Dynamo (Kostroma)	
Dynamo (Stavropol)	
Dynamo (Vologda)	
Energiya (Volzhsky)	= Energy, refers to the Volga Hydroelectric Station in Volshsky
FAYUR (Beslan)	refers to the sponsoring corporation
Gornyak (Uchaly)	= Miner, refers to the copper and zinc mining industry in Uchaly
Gubkin	city name
Irtysh (Omsk)	refers to the Irtysh river
Istra	city name
Kaluga	city name
Karelia (Petrozavodsk)	refers to Karelia Republic
Kavkaztransgaz-2005 (Ryzdvyany)	refers to the sponsoring corporation, an acronym literally translated as "the Caucasus company for gas transit"
Khimik (Dzerzhinsk)	= Chemical industry worker, refers to industries in Dzerzhinsk
Kuzbass (Kemerovo)	= Kuznetsky Basseyn = Kuznetsk Basin, the coal mining area
Lokomotiv-2 (Moscow)	second team of Lokomotiv Moscow; the name reflects sponsorship by Russian Railways
Lokomotiv (Liski)	refers to historical sponsorship by the Liski division of Russian Railways
Mashuk-KMV (Pyatigorsk)	refers to Mount Mashuk. KMV = Kavkazskie Mineralnye Vody = "Mineral Waters of the Caucasus", often used as the name of the region to which Pyatigorsk belongs
Metallurg (Lipetsk)	= Metallurgist, refers to Novolipetsk Steel works in Lipetsk
Metallurg-Kuzbass (Novokuznetsk)	Kuzbass = Kuznetsky Basseyn = Kuznetsk Basin, the coal mining area
Metallurg-Oskol (Stary Oskol)	= Metallurgist, refers to Oskol Electrometallurgic works in Stary Oskol
MITOS (Novocherkassk)	refers to the sponsoring corporation
Mostovik-Primorye (Ussuriysk)	Mostovik = Bridge engineer, reflects sponsorship by a local bridge constructing company. Primorye (= "seaside") is the colloquial name of Primorsky Krai region.
Neftekhimik (Nizhnekamsk)	= Petrochemical industry worker, refers to Nizhnekamskneftekhim Co.
Nosta (Novotroitsk)	Novotroitskaya Stal = "Novotroitsk Steel", the sponsoring corporation
Oktan (Perm)	= Octane, referring to petrochemical industries in Perm
Olimpia (Gelendzhik)	= Olympia
Podolye (Podolsk District)	Podolye = lands around Podolsk, although the term is usually used when referring to Podolia in present-day Ukraine
Petrotrest (St.Petersburg)	refers to the sponsoring corporation
Pskov-747 (Pskov)	city name
Radian-Baikal (Irkutsk)	refers to the sponsoring corporation and Lake Baikal
Rotor (Volgograd)	= Rotor, historically sponsored by the Volgograd tractor factory
Rubin-2 (Kazan)	= Ruby. Second team of Rubin Kazan.
Rusichi (Oryol)	= Rus' people
Sakhalin (Yuzhno-Sakhalinsk)	refers to the Sakhalin Island
Salyut (Belgorod)	= Salute, refers to Belgorod's unofficial status of "the city of the first salute", the city being the first one whose liberation during the World War II in 1943 was marked by a fireworks salute
Saturn-2 (Moscow Oblast)	= Saturn, second team of Saturn Ramenskoye; historically sponsored by an aviation equipment factory
Sever (Murmansk)	= North
Sheksna (Cherepovets)	refers to the Sheksna River
Sibir-2 (Novosibirsk)	= Siberia. Second team of Sibir Novosibirsk
Sibiryak (Bratsk)	= The Siberian
SKA (Rostov-on-Don)	= Sportivny Klub Armii = Sports Club of the Army, a usual name for army teams during the Soviet period (see CSKA)
Slavyanski (Slavyansk-na-Kubani)	= The Slav FC
Smena (Komsomolsk-na-Amure)	= New generation, probably reflecting that the city itself is named after Komsomol, the Young Communist League
Sokol (Saratov)	= Falcon, the name that a football team from Saratov first acquired in 1913
Spartak (Kostroma)	see Spartak
Spartak (Tambov)	
Syzran-2003 (Syzran)	city name
Taganrog	city name
Tekstilshchik (Ivanovo)	= Textile worker, Ivanovo historically considered the centre of the Russian textile industry
Torpedo (Armavir)	Torpedo is a common name for teams sponsored by industries during the Soviet period, see e.g. Torpedo Moscow
Tyumen	city name
Ufa	city name
Volga (Tver)	refers to the Volga river
Volga (Ulyanovsk)	
Volochanin-Ratmir (Vyshny Volochyok)	Volochanin and Ratmir are the names of the two teams that merged in 2002. Volochanin = citizen of Vyshny Volochyok; Ratmir is a corporation based in Tver.
Yakutiya (Yakutsk)	refers to Yakutia Republic
Znamya Truda (Orekhovo-Zuyevo)	= The Banner of the Labour, a relatively common name for teams, clubs, newspapers etc. during the Soviet period
Vityaz (Podolsk)	= Warrior
Zenit (Penza)	= Zenith; see Zenit (sports society)
Zenit-Izhevsk (Izhevsk)	
Zvezda (Ryazan)	= Star
