= 2010 Russian Second Division =

Russian Second Division
- Season: 2010

The 2010 Russian Second Division was the third strongest division in Russian football. The Second Division is geographically divided into 5 zones. The winners of each zone are automatically promoted into the First Division. The bottom finishers of each zone lose professional status and are relegated into the Amateur Football League.

== West ==
=== Standings ===
| Pos | Team | Pld | W | D | L | GF | GA | GD | Pts | Promotion or relegation |
|---|---|---|---|---|---|---|---|---|---|---|
| 1 | Torpedo Vladimir (C, P) | 32 | 20 | 8 | 4 | 64 | 25 | +39 | 68 | Promotion to First Division |
| 2 | Torpedo-ZIL Moscow | 32 | 19 | 7 | 6 | 58 | 30 | +28 | 64 | |
| 3 | Lokomotiv-2 Moscow | 32 | 17 | 9 | 6 | 49 | 29 | +20 | 60 | |
| 4 | Dynamo Vologda | 32 | 16 | 7 | 9 | 51 | 36 | +15 | 55 | |
| 5 | Sheksna Cherepovets | 32 | 14 | 7 | 11 | 40 | 38 | +2 | 49 | |
| 6 | Sever Murmansk | 32 | 13 | 8 | 11 | 40 | 34 | +6 | 47 | |
| 7 | Volochanin-Ratmir Vyshny Volochyok | 32 | 14 | 4 | 14 | 41 | 42 | −1 | 46 | |
| 8 | Istra | 32 | 13 | 5 | 14 | 45 | 41 | +4 | 44 | |
| 9 | Volga Tver | 32 | 12 | 8 | 12 | 30 | 29 | +1 | 44 | |
| 10 | Dnepr Smolensk | 32 | 12 | 7 | 13 | 37 | 45 | −8 | 43 | |
| 11 | Pskov-747 Pskov | 32 | 11 | 7 | 14 | 41 | 55 | −14 | 40 | |
| 12 | Nara-ShBFR Naro-Fominsk | 32 | 9 | 12 | 11 | 34 | 32 | +2 | 39 | |
| 13 | Spartak Kostroma | 32 | 10 | 8 | 14 | 29 | 37 | −8 | 38 | |
| 14 | Zelenograd (R) | 32 | 10 | 6 | 16 | 36 | 44 | −8 | 36 | Relegation to Amateur Football League |
| 15 | Dynamo Kostroma | 32 | 9 | 5 | 18 | 34 | 51 | −17 | 32 | |
| 16 | Tekstilshchik Ivanovo | 32 | 7 | 10 | 15 | 37 | 47 | −10 | 31 | |
| 17 | Sportakademklub Moscow (R) | 32 | 4 | 6 | 22 | 27 | 78 | −51 | 18 | Relegation to Amateur Football League |

Source: PFL
Rules for classification: 1st points; 2nd matches won; 3rd head-to-head (points, matches won, goal difference, goals scored, away goals scored); 4th goal difference; 5th goals scored; 6th away goals scored
(C) Champions; (P) Promoted; (R) Relegated

=== Top scorers ===
Source: PFL (in Russian)

21 goals

- Artur Sarkisov (Lokomotiv-2)

18 goals

- Dmitri Vyazmikin (Torpedo Vladimir)

11 goals

- Aleksei Pugin (Dynamo Vologda)

10 goals

- Konstantin Ionov (Torpedo-ZIL)
- Aleksandr Petukhov (Sever)
- Pavel Vtyurin (Torpedo Vladimir)

9 goals

- Valeri Malyshev (Torpedo Vladimir)
- Radik Safin (Pskov-747)

== Center ==
=== Standings ===
| Pos | Team | Pld | W | D | L | GF | GA | GD | Pts | Promotion or relegation |
|---|---|---|---|---|---|---|---|---|---|---|
| 1 | Torpedo Moscow (C, P) | 30 | 17 | 6 | 7 | 59 | 26 | +33 | 57 | Promotion to First Division |
| 2 | Gubkin | 30 | 16 | 8 | 6 | 53 | 32 | +21 | 56 | |
| 3 | Metallurg-Oskol Stary Oskol | 30 | 16 | 7 | 7 | 47 | 32 | +15 | 55 | |
| 4 | Fakel Voronezh | 30 | 15 | 9 | 6 | 53 | 28 | +25 | 54 | Promotion to First Division |
| 5 | Avangard Podolsk | 30 | 17 | 2 | 11 | 51 | 33 | +18 | 53 | Relegation to Amateur Football League |
| 6 | Vityaz Podolsk | 30 | 15 | 7 | 8 | 53 | 34 | +19 | 52 | |
| 7 | Metallurg Lipetsk | 30 | 15 | 5 | 10 | 41 | 36 | +5 | 50 | |
| 8 | Zenit Penza | 30 | 13 | 11 | 6 | 48 | 36 | +12 | 50 | |
| 9 | Lokomotiv Liski | 30 | 14 | 6 | 10 | 40 | 31 | +9 | 48 | |
| 10 | Kaluga | 30 | 12 | 7 | 11 | 27 | 31 | −4 | 43 | |
| 11 | Zvezda Ryazan | 30 | 12 | 6 | 12 | 37 | 49 | −12 | 42 | |
| 12 | Saturn Moscow Oblast | 30 | 11 | 4 | 15 | 40 | 45 | −5 | 37 | |
| 13 | Rusichi Oryol | 30 | 7 | 10 | 13 | 44 | 43 | +1 | 31 | |
| 14 | Spartak Tambov | 30 | 6 | 8 | 16 | 28 | 42 | −14 | 26 | |
| 15 | Znamya Truda Orekhovo-Zuyevo | 30 | 2 | 5 | 23 | 26 | 71 | −45 | 11 | |
| 16 | Nika Moscow (R) | 30 | 0 | 3 | 27 | 11 | 89 | −78 | 3 | Relegation to Amateur Football League |

Source: PFL
Rules for classification: 1st points; 2nd matches won; 3rd head-to-head (points, matches won, goal difference, goals scored, away goals scored); 4th goal difference; 5th goals scored; 6th away goals scored
(C) Champions; (P) Promoted; (R) Relegated

=== Top scorers ===
Source: PFL (in Russian)

20 goals

- Yevgeni Polyakov (Rusichi)

19 goals

- Andrei Myazin (Vityaz)

15 goals

- Ilya Borodin (Zvezda)
- Denis Kirilenko (Gubkin)

13 goals

- Sergei Faustov (Gubkin / Fakel)

11 goals

- Yegor Larionov (Saturn-2 / Znamya Truda)

== South ==
FC Bataysk-2007 dropped out of the competition on July 31 due to lack of finances. All their opponents in the remaining scheduled matches were awarded a 3-0 win.

=== Standings ===
| Pos | Team | Pld | W | D | L | GF | GA | GD | Pts | Promotion or relegation |
|---|---|---|---|---|---|---|---|---|---|---|
| 1 | Chernomorets Novorossiysk (C, P) | 32 | 24 | 4 | 4 | 63 | 20 | +43 | 76 | Promotion to First Division |
| 2 | Armavir | 32 | 20 | 9 | 3 | 41 | 15 | +26 | 69 | |
| 3 | Mashuk-KMV Pyatigorsk | 32 | 18 | 8 | 6 | 53 | 27 | +26 | 62 | |
| 4 | Astrakhan | 32 | 17 | 7 | 8 | 58 | 35 | +23 | 58 | |
| 5 | Krasnodar-2000 | 32 | 15 | 11 | 6 | 51 | 27 | +24 | 56 | Relegation to Amateur Football League |
| 6 | Beslan-FAYUR Beslan | 32 | 12 | 9 | 11 | 36 | 37 | −1 | 45 | |
| 7 | Kavkaztransgaz-2005 Ryzdvyany | 32 | 12 | 8 | 12 | 40 | 51 | −11 | 44 | |
| 8 | MITOS Novocherkassk | 32 | 11 | 9 | 12 | 47 | 45 | +2 | 42 | |
| 9 | Druzhba Maykop | 32 | 12 | 5 | 15 | 37 | 40 | −3 | 41 | |
| 10 | Angusht Nazran | 32 | 9 | 13 | 10 | 37 | 43 | −6 | 40 | |
| 11 | Energiya Volzhsky | 32 | 10 | 9 | 13 | 43 | 52 | −9 | 39 | |
| 12 | Dagdizel Kaspiysk | 32 | 10 | 7 | 15 | 42 | 42 | 0 | 37 | |
| 13 | Dynamo Stavropol | 32 | 8 | 13 | 11 | 34 | 47 | −13 | 37 | |
| 14 | SKA Rostov-on-Don | 32 | 9 | 9 | 14 | 34 | 39 | −5 | 36 | |
| 15 | Taganrog | 32 | 8 | 4 | 20 | 28 | 53 | −25 | 28 | |
| 16 | Avtodor Vladikavkaz | 32 | 5 | 8 | 19 | 31 | 50 | −19 | 23 | Relegation to Amateur Football League |
| 17 | Bataysk-2007 (R) | 32 | 4 | 3 | 25 | 19 | 71 | −52 | 15 | Relegation to Amateur Football League |

Source: PFL
Rules for classification: 1st points; 2nd matches won; 3rd head-to-head (points, matches won, goal difference, goals scored, away goals scored); 4th goal difference; 5th goals scored; 6th away goals scored
(C) Champions; (P) Promoted; (R) Relegated

=== Top scorers ===
Source: PFL (in Russian)

16 goals

- Pavel Safronov (Mashuk-KMV)

13 goals

- Aleksandr Golubev (Astrakhan)
- Timirlan Shavanov (Dagdizel)
- Dmitri Shovgenov (Kavkaztransgaz-2005)
- Roman Smolskiy (MITOS)

12 goals

- Aleksei Buznyakov (SKA)

10 goals

- Sergei Grinenko (Astrakhan)
- Zhumaldin Karatlyashev (Chernomorets)
- (Kazakhstan) Roman Uzdenov (Druzhba)

9 goals

- Vasili Brovin (Dynamo)
- Batraz Kaloyev (Beslan-FAYUR)
- Vadim Luchin (Angusht)
- Valentin Okorochkov (Chernomorets)

== Ural-Povolzhye ==
=== Standings ===
| Pos | Team | Pld | W | D | L | GF | GA | GD | Pts | Promotion or relegation |
|---|---|---|---|---|---|---|---|---|---|---|
| 1 | Gazovik Orenburg (C, P) | 26 | 20 | 4 | 2 | 62 | 18 | +44 | 64 | Promotion to First Division |
| 2 | Tyumen | 26 | 16 | 6 | 4 | 53 | 26 | +27 | 54 | |
| 3 | SOYUZ-Gazprom Izhevsk | 26 | 14 | 5 | 7 | 39 | 24 | +15 | 47 | |
| 4 | Gornyak Uchaly | 26 | 13 | 8 | 5 | 43 | 22 | +21 | 47 | |
| 5 | Sokol Saratov | 26 | 13 | 7 | 6 | 39 | 31 | +8 | 46 | |
| 6 | Chelyabinsk | 26 | 13 | 6 | 7 | 37 | 28 | +9 | 45 | |
| 7 | Neftekhimik Nizhnekamsk | 26 | 12 | 9 | 5 | 49 | 32 | +17 | 45 | |
| 8 | Akademiya Togliatti | 26 | 12 | 4 | 10 | 41 | 32 | +9 | 40 | |
| 9 | Khimik Dzerzhinsk | 26 | 7 | 8 | 11 | 28 | 39 | −11 | 29 | |
| 10 | Bashinformsvyaz-Dynamo Ufa | 26 | 8 | 4 | 14 | 24 | 38 | −14 | 28 | |
| 11 | Volga Ulyanovsk | 26 | 6 | 8 | 12 | 19 | 29 | −10 | 26 | |
| 12 | Nosta Novotroitsk | 26 | 5 | 3 | 18 | 28 | 66 | −38 | 18 | |
| 13 | Dynamo Kirov | 26 | 3 | 6 | 17 | 14 | 50 | −36 | 15 | |
| 14 | Rubin-2 Kazan | 26 | 0 | 2 | 24 | 16 | 57 | −41 | 2 | |

Source: PFL
Rules for classification: 1st points; 2nd matches won; 3rd head-to-head (points, matches won, goal difference, goals scored, away goals scored); 4th goal difference; 5th goals scored; 6th away goals scored
(C) Champions; (P) Promoted

=== Top scorers ===
Source: PFL (in Russian)

19 goals

- Mikhail Tyufyakov (Neftekhimik)

17 goals

- Marat Shogenov (Gazovik)

11 goals

- Aleksandr Korotayev (Akademiya)
- Viktor Zemchenkov (Tyumen)

10 goals

- Vladimir Morozov (Chelyabinsk)

9 goals

- Konstantin Nizovtsev (Gazovik)

== East ==
=== Standings ===
| Pos | Team | Pld | W | D | L | GF | GA | GD | Pts | Promotion or relegation |
|---|---|---|---|---|---|---|---|---|---|---|
| 1 | Metallurg-Yenisey Krasnoyarsk (C, P) | 30 | 18 | 7 | 5 | 50 | 24 | +26 | 61 | Promotion to First Division |
| 2 | Radian-Baikal Irkutsk | 30 | 17 | 5 | 8 | 56 | 43 | +13 | 56 | |
| 3 | Chita | 30 | 15 | 8 | 7 | 43 | 27 | +16 | 53 | |
| 4 | Dynamo Barnaul | 30 | 14 | 6 | 10 | 48 | 42 | +6 | 48 | |
| 5 | Sakhalin Yuzhno-Sakhalinsk | 30 | 12 | 11 | 7 | 38 | 29 | +9 | 47 | |
| 6 | Metallurg-Kuzbass Novokuznetsk | 30 | 11 | 14 | 5 | 49 | 29 | +20 | 47 | |
| 7 | Smena Komsomolsk-na-Amure | 30 | 12 | 10 | 8 | 41 | 27 | +14 | 46 | |
| 8 | KUZBASS Kemerovo | 30 | 8 | 5 | 17 | 29 | 45 | −16 | 29 | |
| 9 | Mostovik-Primorye Ussuriysk | 30 | 6 | 8 | 16 | 29 | 54 | −25 | 26 | |
| 10 | Sibiryak Bratsk | 30 | 6 | 6 | 18 | 27 | 50 | −23 | 24 | |
| 11 | Okean Nakhodka (R) | 30 | 2 | 8 | 20 | 18 | 58 | −40 | 14 | Relegation to Amateur Football League |

Source: PFL
Rules for classification: 1st points; 2nd matches won; 3rd head-to-head (points, matches won, goal difference, goals scored, away goals scored); 4th goal difference; 5th goals scored; 6th away goals scored
(C) Champions; (P) Promoted; (R) Relegated

=== Top scorers ===
Source: PFL (in Russian)

19 goals

- Valentin Yegunov (Metallurg-Kuzbass)

14 goals

- Aleksei Bazanov (Metallurg-Yenisey)

11 goals

- Maksim Bondarenko (Sakhalin)
- Vladimir Nakhanovich (Radian-Baikal)
- Denis Uryvkov (Metallurg-Kuzbass)

9 goals

- Georgy Garmashov (Chita)
- Kirill Kochkayev (Chita)
- Sergei Narylkov (Dynamo)
- Aleksei Nekrasov (Radian-Baikal)
- Eduard Uchurov (Radian-Baikal)
- Sergei Voronov (KUZBASS)

8 goals

- Stanislav Goncharov (Metallurg-Yenisey)
- Andrei Lodis (Smena)
