= Aleksandr Golubev =

Aleksandr Golubev may refer to:

- Aleksandr Golubev (intelligence officer) (1936–2020), Soviet and Russian intelligence officer
- Aleksandr Golubev (footballer) (born 1986), Russian footballer
- Aleksandr Golubev (speed skater) (born 1972), Russian speed skater
