= Golubev =

Golubev (Russian: Голубев; masculine) or Golubeva (Го́лубева; feminine) is a Russian last name, derived from the Russian word голубь (golub, "pigeon"). It may refer to:

- Aleksandr Titovich Golubev (1936–2020), Soviet and Russian intelligence officer
- Aleksandr Golubev (footballer) (b. 1986), Russian association football player
- Aleksandr Golubev (speed skater) (b. 1972), Russian speed skater
- Andrey Golubev (b. 1987), Kazakh tennis player
- Dmitry Golubev (disambiguation), several people
- Evgeny Golubev (1910–1988), Russian composer
- Georgy Golubev (1919–2005), Soviet army officer and Hero of the Soviet Union
- Ivan Golubev (1841–1918), Russian politician
- Ivan Andreevich Golubev, Russian name of Wang Ming, an early Chinese Communist Party leader and 28 Bolsheviks member
- Kirill Golubev (b. 1974), Soviet and Russian ice hockey player
- Konstantin Golubev (1896 – 1956), Soviet general and army commander during World War II
- Sergey Golubev (officer) (1923–?), Soviet army officer, Hero of the Soviet Union and consultant on the assassination of Georgy Markov
- Sergey Golubev (b. 1978), Russian bobsledder
- Valery Golubev (b. 1952), Russian politician and businessman
- Vasily Golubev (painter) (1925–1985), Soviet, Russian painter
- Vasily Golubev (politician) (born 1957), governor of Rostov Oblast, Russia
- Viktor Golubev (1916–1945), Soviet aircraft pilot and twice Hero of the Soviet Union
- Vladimir Golubev (mathematician) (1884–1954), Soviet mathematician and mechanic
- Vladimir Golubev (footballer) (1950–2022), Soviet association football player and coach

== See also ==
- Cody Goloubef (born 1989), Canadian hockey player
