= Sidelnikov =

Sidelnikov (masculine, Russian: Сидельников) or Sidelnikova (feminine, Russian: Сидельникова), also Romanized as Sydelnykov, is a Russian surname. Notable people with the surname include:

- Alexander Sidelnikov (1950–2003), Russian Soviet ice hockey player
- Andrei Gennadyevich Sidelnikov (born 1980), Russian-born Kazakh footballer
- Andriy Sidelnikov (born 1967), Ukrainian Soviet footballer
- Anton Sidelnikov (born 1981), Russian footballer
- Kirill Sidelnikov (born 1988), Russian mixed martial artist
- Nikolaï Sidelnikov (1930–1992), Russian Soviet composer
