= Goryunov =

Goryunov (Russian: Горюнов, from горюн meaning a grieving person) is a Russian masculine surname, its feminine counterpart is Goryunova. It may refer to:

- Ivan Goryunov (born 1988), Russian football player
- Sergey Goryunov (born 1958), Russian association football coach and former player
- Victor Goryunov, Russian mathematician

== See also ==
- SG-43 Goryunov, a Soviet medium machine gun
