= Brovin =

Brovin (masculine, Russian: Бровин) or Brovina (feminine, Russian: Бровина) is a Russian surname. Notable people with the surname include:

- Flora Brovina (born 1949), Kosovar–Albanian activist, pediatrician, and poet
- Vasili Brovin (born 1982), Russian football player
