= Ragoza =

Ragoza is a surname. Notable people with the surname include:

- Alexander Ragoza (1858–1919), Russian general and Ukrainian politician
- Yevgeni Ragoza (born 1979), Russian footballer and coach

== See also ==
- Rogoza (disambiguation)
