= Old Lyepyel =

Village in Lyepyel District, Belarus

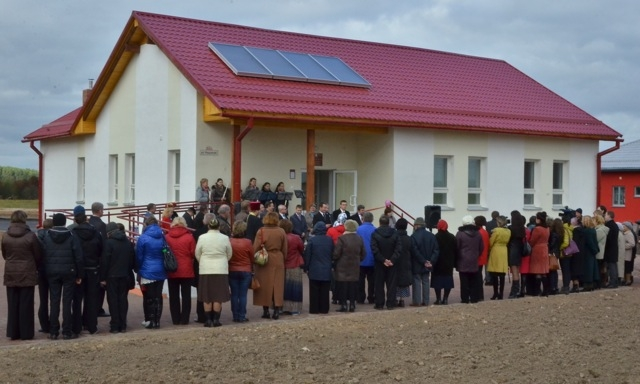
Outpatient clinic: inauguration, 2013

Old Lyepyel (Belarusian: Стары Лепель, romanized: Stary Liepieĺ, Russian: Старый Лепель, romanized: Stary Lepel) is a village in Lyepyel District, Vitebsk Region, Belarus. Since 2004 it is included in to the Stai selsoviet.

== See also ==
- Lyepyel
