= Berezinsky Biosphere Reserve =

Nature reserve in Belarus

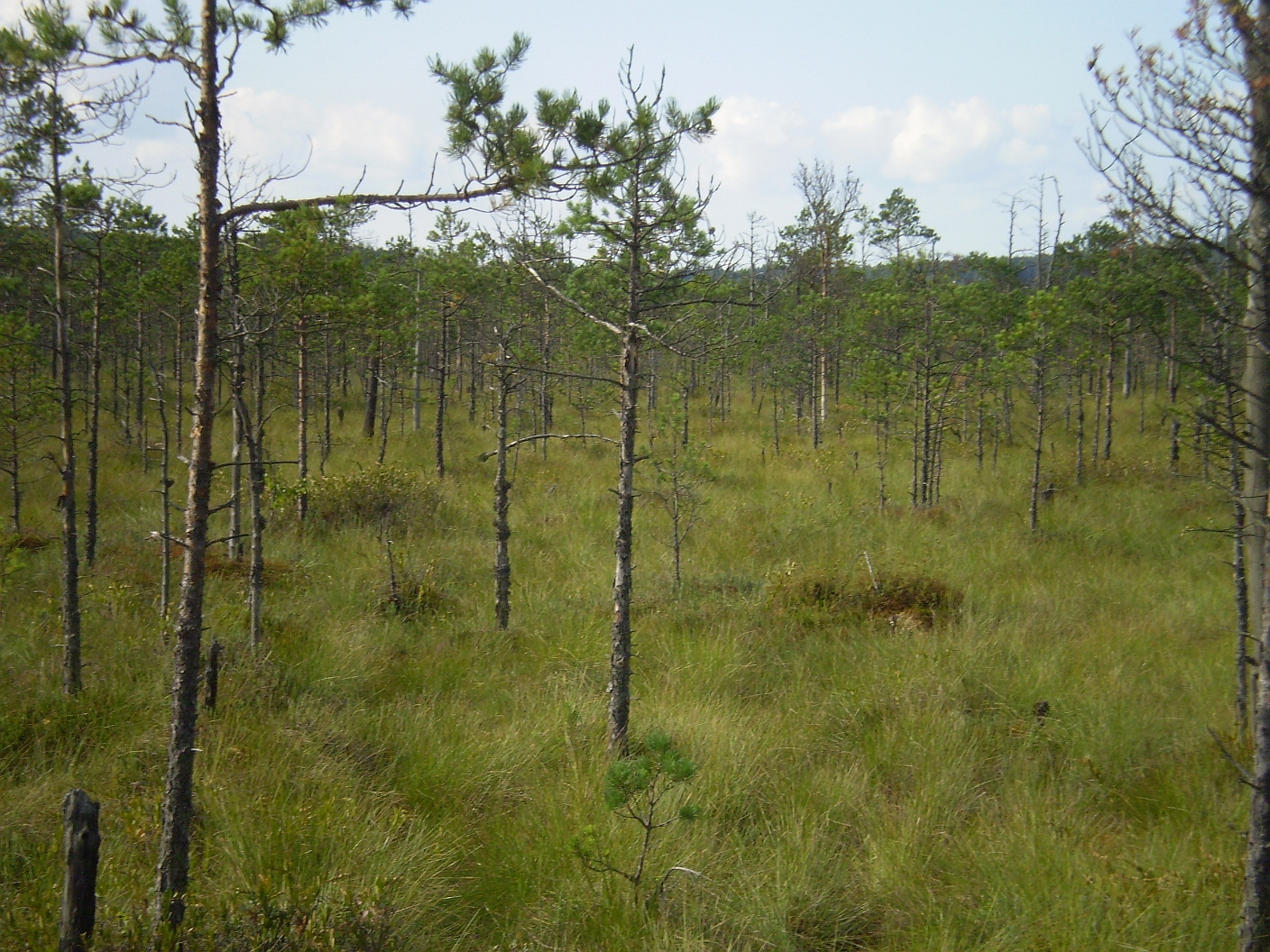

- Location within Belarus
- Nearest city: Lyepyel
- Coordinates: 54°46′21″N 28°19′30″E
- Area: 85,200 ha (329 sq mi)
- Created: 1925
- Website: https://www.berezinsky.by/

Berezinsky Biosphere Reserve (Belarusian: Бярэзінскі біясферны запаведнік) is a nature reserve in the northern part of Belarus, 120 km from Minsk. It is located on the border of Vitebsk and Minsk regions. The centre of the reserve is the village of Domzheritsy in Lyepyel District.

The reserve serves for the protection and breeding of rare species of animals and birds, which are listed in the Red Book of Belarus. Berezinsky Biosphere Reserve is a part of the UNESCO World Network of Biosphere Reserves.

== Profile ==
The total area of the reserve zone is 85.2 thousand hectares. Over 60% of the territory is covered with marshes. Many endangered species of animals, birds, plants and insects are registered in the reserve. Twenty-three rare European biotopes are recorded here.

== History ==
The idea to create a nature reserve in the area was first voiced by Anatoly Vladimirovich Fedyushin, a scientist and a head of the site investigation committee assigned in 1924 by state officials. Berezinskiy Nature Reserve was established on January 30, 1925. It became one of the first nature reserves in the USSR. In 1927, the first inventory work started; in 1928–1930, the resettlement of 30 farmsteads from the protected lands began. In 1929, forest inventory work was organized; in 1935, experimental farms for beaver and elk breeding were established. In 1936, the area of the reserve was expanded to 67.3 hectares, but in 1938 Belarusian authorities excluded 18.7 hectares of land from it under the reason of having no "valuable species of fauna".

During World War II and the German occupation, the reserve was seriously damaged: all archives, scientific collections and materials were destroyed, service buildings were burnt down. The total damage caused to the Berezinskiy Reserve was estimated at 18.7 million roubles. In 1951, the authorities decided to liquidate the nature reserve and open a hunting reserve in its place. During this period, over 40 km² of forest were clear-cut. In 1958, however, the Berezinskiy was restored to its initial status.

In 1979, Berezinsky was granted the status of a biosphere reserve. In 1993, the Council of Europe included it in the network of biogenetic reserves, and in 1995 awarded it with the European Diploma for successful work on the conservation of biodiversity and natural complexes. The diploma is awarded for a period of 5 years, and the reserve has been successfully evaluated in the future and has been awarded a renewal of the diploma in 2000, 2005, and 2010.

Berezinskiy Biosphere Reserve became a Ramsar site in 2010. As of 2019, the Reserve leads conservation, scientific, environmental education, tourism and commercial activities. The Reserve has received a certificate of compliance with the Forest Stewardship Council (FSC) and is engaged in logging and timber processing business.

== Landscapes ==
The marshes of the Reserve cover an area of more than 520 km^{2}, which makes it one of the largest marshlands in Europe. The predominant type is fen (more than 54.5%), 35.3% are midland bogs, 10.3% are raised. The Berezina river flows through the reserve for 100 km, fed by more than 50 small tributaries. In its basin there are four large interconnected lakes: Olshitsa, Plavno, Manets, Domzheritskoe, as well as many smaller lakes.

== Biodiversity ==
Berezinskiy is a home to many species of plants and animals, some of which are listed in the Red Book. In total, 56 species of animals, 237 species of birds, 10 species of amphibians, 5 species of reptiles, and 34 species of fish are registered in the Reserve. All of the 'Big European Five' (biggest mammals) live here: European bison, brown bear, moose, Eurasian lynx. Other animals registered in Berezinsky are Eurasian beaver, Eurasian otter, European badger, among birds — Osprey, black stork, short-toed snake eagle, common crane, golden eagle, white-tailed eagle, Eurasian eagle-owl, peregrine falcon, willow ptarmigan, Eurasian three-toed woodpecker. The reserve has been designated an Important Bird Area (IBA) by BirdLife International because it supports significant populations of many bird species.

In 1954 the American mink was introduced into the reserve, and in 1956 started the work on acclimatization of the red deer. The flora of the Reserve holds more than 50% of the total diversity of the Belorussian flora. There are 813 species of vascular plants, 216 species of mosses, 261 species of lichens, and 464 species of fungi. The main forest-forming tree species are birch, alder, aspen, oak, Fraxinus, etc. The world of insects in the reserve is represented by 33 species of aquatic true bugs from 10 families. By 2006, 4 alien animal species and at least 30 invasive plant species had been detected in the reserve.

== Tourism ==
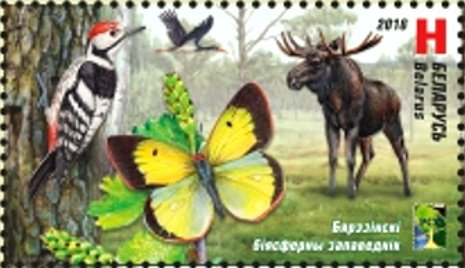
Belarusian postal stamp dedicated to the reserve

Berezinskiy Biosphere Reserve is one of the leading ecotourism centres in Belarus, with more than a third of its income coming from tourism. The visitors are offered a variety of trails, education programmes, and festivals. The infrastructure includes a network of hiking and cycling routes, research stations. and several museums. In 2019, the reserve has received 57,000 tourists. Depending on the season, brown bears, Lyrurus, elks and deer can be observed in the wild.

== Sources ==
- Kozlo, P. G. (2007). "Bison as an object of hunting". Modern Problems of Nature Management, Hunting and Fur Farming (1). Archived from the original on 2023-07-05.
- Levko, O. (2012). "Archaeological heritage of Belarus". Science and Innovation. 10 (116): 23–26. Archived from the original on 2023-07-05.
- Semenchenko, V.; Pugachevsky, A. (2006). "The problem of invasive species in the fauna and flora of Belarus". Science and Innovation. 10 (44). Archived from the original on 2023-07-05.
- Korneev, A. N. (2013). "Current state of specially protected natural territories of the Union State of Russia and Belarus". University Bulletin (13): 53–59. Archived from the original on 2023-07-06.
- Bakhur, A. U.; Jalinik, N. (2018). "Analysis of the natural potential and ecological tourism development in Belarus". Tourism and Hospitality. 2. Archived from the original on 2023-07-06.
- Kuzmenko, V. J. (2015). Current state and dynamics of biodiversity of wetland ecosystems of the Belarusian lakeside region (in Russian). ISBN 978-985-517-515-6.
- Bogutsky, Y. V.; Bogutskaya, T. S. (2020). "Wader colony in an open area of Rozhnyansky bog in Berezinski Biosphere Reserve". Russian Journal of Ornithology. 29 (1989): 4990–4991. Archived from the original on 2023-07-08.
- Suslo, D. S. (2022). "Biotopes of larvae of blood-sucking mosquitoes (Diptera: Culicidae) of the Berezinsk Biosphere Reserve". Russian Journal of Parasitology. 2. Archived from the original on 2023-07-05.
- Lukashuk, A. O. (2017). "Aquatic semi-arthropods (Hemiptera: Heteroptera) of water bodies of the upper bogs of the Berezinskiy Biosphere Reserve". Publications of the Institute of Inland Water Biology of the Russian Academy of Sciences. 79 (82). doi:10.24411/0320-3557-2017-10047. Archived from the original on 2023-07-05.
- Lednitskiy, A. V.; Gaida, A. G. (2021). "Ecological tourism as a direction of development of specially protected natural territories of the Republic of Belarus". Proceedings of BSTU (5): 92–96. Archived from the original on 2023-07-05.
- Khokh, A. N.; Zviagintsev, V. B. (2022). "The characteristics of the elemental composition of the Scots pine wood in accordance with the conditions of a growing site and a vegetation phase". Izvestiya of Saratov University. Chemistry. Biology. Ecology. 22 (1): 47–56. doi:10.18500/1816-9775-2022-22-1-47-56. S2CID 247875540. Archived from the original on 2023-07-06.
- Ivkovich, V. S.; Lukashuk, A. O. (2021). "Anatoly Vladimirovich Fedyushin and the establishment of the Berezinskiy Biosphere Reserve". Proceedings of the VI International Scientific and Practical Conference on the 130th Anniversary of Doctor of Biological Sciences, Professor Anatoly Vladimirovich Fedyushin. Editorial Board: O.V. Yanchurevich (Editor-in-Chief), A.V. Ryzhaya, A.E. Karevsky. Yanka Kupala State University of Grodno.
- Rak, A. V.; Ivanovsky, V. V.; Novikov, D. (2023). "Locating potential nesting sites of the osprey Randion Haliaetus in the Berezinskiy Reserve". Russian Journal of Ornithology. 2277. Archived from the original on 2023-07-05.
- Stavrovsky, D. D.; Kovalev, A. A. (1996). Berezinsky Biosphere Reserve. Belarusian Encyclopaedia. p. 26. ISBN 978-985-11-0062-6. Archived from the original on 2023-07-16.
- Bogdanovich, I. A. (2015). "Population and distribution of whooper swan cygnus cygnus in Belarus". Russian Journal of Ornithology. 24 (1162): 2385–2387. Archived from the original on 2023-07-05.
