= Vladimir Serov =

Vladimir Serov may refer to:

- Vladimir Serov (footballer) (born 1979), Russian football player
- Vladimir Serov (painter) (1910–1968), Soviet painter
- Vladimir Serov (pilot) (1922–1944), Soviet flying ace
