= Zyazikov (surname) =

Zyazikov (Russian: Зязиков) is an Ingush surname. Notable people with the surname include:

- Murat Zyazikov (born 1957), Russian politician
- Ruslan Zyazikov (born 1984), Russian footballer
