= Nikita Fursin =

Russian footballer

Personal information
- Full name: Nikita Vladimirovich Fursin
- Date of birth: 9 March 1983 (age 43)
- Place of birth: Oboyan, Russian SFSR
- Height: 1.89 m (6 ft 2 1/2 in)
- Position: Defender

Team information
- Current team: Oryol (director)

Senior career*
Years	Team	Apps	(Gls)
2002	Mostransgaz Gazoprovod	35	(2)
2003	Avangard Kursk	26	(3)
2004–2005	Salyut-Energiya Belgorod	52	(2)
2006–2007	Mika Yerevan	36	(2)
2008	Granit Mikashevichi	27	(1)
2009	Mika Yerevan	17	(1)
2010	Belshina Bobruisk	15	(1)
2010	Torpedo Zhodino	7	(0)
2011–2012	Neftekhimik Nizhnekamsk	36	(2)
2012–2014	Tyumen	52	(1)
2014	Fakel Voronezh	3	(0)
2015	Oryol	13	(0)
2016	Avangard Kursk	15	(0)

Managerial career
- 2024–: Oryol (director)
- * Club domestic league appearances and goals

Nikita Vladimirovich Fursin (Russian: Никита Владимирович Фурсин; born 9 March 1983) is a Russian professional football official and a former player. He is the director of Oryol.

== Club career ==
He played in the Russian Football National League for FC Tyumen in 2014.
