= Yawhen Kalinin =

Belarusian footballer

Personal information
- Date of birth: 15 August 1993 (age 33)
- Place of birth: Lepel, Vitebsk Oblast, Belarus
- Height: 1.80 m (5 ft 11 in)
- Position: Midfielder

Youth career
- 2010–2012: BATE Borisov

Senior career*
Years	Team	Apps	(Gls)
2011–2014	BATE Borisov	0	(0)
2013	→ Slutsk (loan)	18	(3)
2014	→ Smorgon (loan)	24	(4)
2015	Smorgon	26	(10)
2016–2017	Vitebsk	13	(1)
2017	→ Naftan Novopolotsk (loan)	7	(1)
2017	→ Slonim-2017 (loan)	14	(2)
2018	Orsha	13	(5)
2018	Dnepr Mogilev	0	(0)
2019	Lokomotiv Gomel	8	(1)
2019	Smorgon	11	(0)
2020	Orsha	25	(4)
2021	Dnepr Rogachev	2	(0)
2021–2022	Lepel	5	(1)
- * Club domestic league appearances and goals as of 31 December 2022

Yawhen Kalinin (Belarusian: Яўген Калінін; Russian: Евгений Калинин; born 15 August 1993) is a Belarusian professional footballer.
