= Rogoza (disambiguation) =

Rogoza is a settlement in Slovenia.

Rogoza may also refer to:

- Rogoža, a village in Croatia
- Alexander Rogoza (1858–1919), Imperial Russian Army general (also transliterated from Cyrillic as Rohoza)
- Michael Rogoza (died 1599), Ruthenian bishop (also Rohoza)
- Rogoza (river), a tributary of Siret

== See also ==
- Ragoza, a related surname
