= 2008 Russian First Division =

Russian First Division
- Season: 2008

The 2008 Russian First Division was the 17th edition of Russian First Division. There were 22 teams.

== Teams ==
15 clubs placed 3–17 in 2007 Russian First Division, 2 clubs relegated from 2007 Russian Premier League and 5 zone winners from 2007 Russian Second Division took part in the league:

Location of teams in 2008 Russian First Division

Team	Place
FC Kuban Krasnodar	Krasnodar
FC Rostov	Rostov-on-Don
FC Sibir Novosibirsk	Novosibirsk
FC KAMAZ Naberezhnye Chelny	Naberezhnye Chelny
FC Ural Sverdlovsk Oblast	Yekaterinburg
FC Torpedo Moscow	Moscow
FC Nosta Novotroitsk	Novotroitsk
FC Dynamo Bryansk	Bryansk
FC Salyut-Energia Belgorod	Belgorod
FC Anzhi Makhachkala	Makhachkala
FC Zvezda Irkutsk	Irkutsk

Team	Place
FC Alania Vladikavkaz	Vladikavkaz
FC SKA-Energia Khabarovsk	Khabarovsk
FC Mashuk-KMV Pyatigorsk	Pyatigorsk
FC Baltika Kaliningrad	Kaliningrad
FC Metallurg-Kuzbass Novokuznetsk	Novokuznetsk
FC SKA Rostov-on-Don	Rostov-on-Don
FC Vityaz Podolsk	Podolsk
FC Dynamo Barnaul	Barnaul
FC Sportakademklub Moscow	Moscow
FC Chernomorets Novorossiysk	Novorossiysk
FC Volga Ulyanovsk	Ulyanovsk

On 23 October 2008 FC Zvezda Irkutsk had to stop participation in the league due to lack of funds, their main sponsor Interavia airlines is having financial problems at the time. Zvezda failed to fulfil four last fixtures.

== Standings ==
Pos	Team	Pld	W	D	L	GF	GA	GD	Pts	Promotion or relegation
1	Rostov (P)	42	29	9	4	78	29	+49	96	Promotion to Premier League
2	Kuban Krasnodar (P)	42	27	6	9	84	36	+48	87	Promotion to Premier League
3	KAMAZ Naberezhnye Chelny	42	23	10	9	68	41	+27	79	
4	Ural Sverdlovsk Oblast	42	22	9	11	69	39	+30	75	
5	Nosta Novotroitsk	42	20	13	9	59	37	+22	73	
6	Anzhi Makhachkala	42	20	12	10	63	35	+28	72	
7	Baltika Kaliningrad	42	17	14	11	43	34	+9	65	
8	SKA-Khabarovsk	42	17	10	15	63	60	+3	61	
9	Chernomorets Novorossiysk	42	16	13	13	51	38	+13	61	
10	Alania Vladikavkaz	42	17	8	17	50	47	+3	59	
11	Vityaz Podolsk	42	17	7	18	49	57	−8	58 (Note: Head-to-head record: Salyut-Energia – Vityaz 0–2, Vityaz – Salyut-Energia 1–0.)	
12	Salyut-Energia Belgorod	42	17	7	18	51	51	0	58	
13	SKA Rostov-on-Don	42	15	13	14	52	50	+2	58	
14	Sibir Novosibirsk	42	14	16	12	51	41	+10	58	
15	Sportakademklub Moscow	42	16	9	17	55	57	−2	57	
16	Metallurg-Kuzbass Novokuznetsk (R)	42	14	15	13	44	42	+2	57	Relegation to Second Division
17	Volga Ulyanovsk (R)	42	15	4	23	50	65	−15	49	Relegation to Second Division
18	Torpedo Moscow (R)	42	14	7	21	47	69	−22	49	Relegation to Second Division
19	Mashuk-KMV Pyatigorsk (R)	42	8	8	26	39	79	−40	32	Relegation to Second Division
20	Dynamo Barnaul (R)	42	6	9	27	31	80	−49	27	Relegation to Second Division
21	Dynamo Bryansk (R)	42	6	4	32	30	81	−51	22	Relegation to Second Division
22	Zvezda Irkutsk (Note: Zvezda Irkutsk deducted 18 points for failing to pay for player transfers.) (R)	42	8	5	29	36	95	−59	11	Relegation to Second Division

Source: PFL, Soccerway
Rules for classification: 1st points; 2nd matches won; 3rd head-to-head (points, matches won, goal difference, goals scored, away goals scored); 4th goal difference; 5th goals scored; 6th away goals scored
(P) Promoted; (R) Relegated

== Results ==
Home \ Away	ALA	ANZ	BAL	CHE	DBN	DBR	KAM	KUB	KMV	MTK	NOS	ROS	SAL	SKA	SKR	SIB	SAK	TOR	URL	VIT	VOL	ZVE
Alania Vladikavkaz		1–0	2–0	0–0	2–0	1–0	0–1	1–0	2–0	1–0	0–2	1–1	1–1	1–1	2–1	1–0	2–0	1–2	1–0	4–1	2–2	3–0 (Note: Zvezda Irkutsk were unable to play these matches and were awarded to the opposing team 3–0.)
Anzhi Makhachkala	2–0		1–1	3–0	3–0	1–1	2–0	1–1	5–2	0–0	0–0	3–2	2–0	4–0	2–1	0–0	4–2	3–0	1–1	1–0	2–1	0–0
Baltika Kaliningrad	1–0	1–0		1–1	1–0	3–0	3–0	0–1	3–0	0–0	0–1	0–0	2–1	0–0	0–1	1–1	2–1	2–1	1–1	4–1	2–0	2–0
Chernomorets Novorossiysk	2–0	0–1	2–0		3–0	4–0	0–0	0–1	3–2	0–1	1–0	0–1	0–1	2–0	2–0	1–2	2–1	4–1	1–3	1–0	4–2	3–0
Dynamo Barnaul	0–2	1–3	1–0	1–0		0–0	2–5	1–3	2–0	0–1	2–2	1–2	1–2	2–2	0–2	0–0	3–1	1–2	0–3	0–0	2–0	2–1
Dynamo Bryansk	0–2	1–5	0–1	1–2	4–0		1–2	0–2	0–1	0–1	1–4	0–1	1–1	1–0	0–1	0–0	0–1	0–1	1–3	2–1	1–2	1–3
KAMAZ Naberezhnye Chelny	2–1	1–0	1–1	2–2	7–0	3–1		3–4	2–1	4–2	0–0	1–0	2–0	2–0	1–1	2–3	1–0	3–0	2–1	1–0	2–0	0–1
Kuban Krasnodar	3–0	4–0	2–0	4–2	3–0	3–0	3–0		5–0	2–0	0–1	1–1	2–2	2–0	3–0	2–0	3–0	3–2	0–0	0–1	4–2	5–0
Mashuk-KMV Pyatigorsk	1–2	1–1	2–1	0–0	1–1	3–1	1–1	2–0		1–0	0–1	0–1	2–2	1–3	1–4	0–0	2–1	0–1	2–4	0–1	0–1	3–0
Metallurg-Kuzbass Novokuznetsk	3–3	1–1	0–0	0–0	1–0	3–0	1–1	0–1	2–1		1–1	0–1	0–2	1–1	2–2	3–1	1–0	2–0	1–0	2–3	2–0	2–1
Nosta Novotroitsk	1–0	1–3	0–0	0–0	3–1	2–1	0–1	1–0	3–1	0–0		1–1	1–0	1–1	4–0	2–1	1–1	1–0	2–2	1–0	2–1	0–0
Rostov	3–2	2–1	1–0	2–1	4–1	3–0	1–0	1–0	6–0	1–1	1–1		3–1	3–1	2–0	2–3	1–0	1–0	3–1	3–1	5–0	2–0
Salyut-Energia Belgorod	1–0	1–0	4–0	0–0	1–0	1–2	2–0	0–2	3–1	0–0	4–3	1–2		3–2	0–1	2–0	1–2	4–2	3–1	0–2	1–1	3–0
SKA-Khabarovsk	3–2	1–0	0–0	2–2	1–0	2–1	0–1	1–2	3–2	2–1	3–2	2–2	1–0		4–1	1–1	0–1	4–0	1–4	3–0	2–1	3–0
SKA Rostov-on-Don	3–1	0–0	1–1	1–0	0–0	5–1	3–4	0–1	1–0	1–1	0–3	0–1	3–0	2–2		0–0	1–1	0–0	1–0	2–3	2–0	4–1
Sibir Novosibirsk	2–1	1–0	1–1	0–0	2–1	3–1	1–2	4–0	2–2	1–0	1–2	0–0	0–1	2–1	1–1		1–1	1–1	2–0	2–2	1–0	5–0
Sportakademklub Moscow	3–1	1–2	0–2	1–1	1–1	3–1	0–0	2–2	2–0	3–4	1–0	2–1	1–0	3–1	1–2	1–0		1–2	3–2	1–1	3–1	2–1
Torpedo Moscow	2–2	4–2	0–2	0–0	2–1	1–0	1–1	1–3	3–0	0–0	1–3	0–2	1–2	2–1	1–0	1–4	1–3		2–2	2–4	3–1	3–0
Ural Sverdlovsk Oblast	0–0	0–0	0–1	2–0	3–1	2–0	1–3	2–1	2–0	1–0	1–0	1–1	2–0	3–0	0–0	1–0	2–0	2–0		4–1	2–1	5–1
Vityaz Podolsk	1–0	0–1	1–1	1–1	1–1	2–1	1–0	1–3	2–0	3–1	1–0	0–1	1–0	0–3	2–1	1–1	3–0	0–1	0–3		2–3	2–1
Volga Ulyanovsk	0–1	1–0	4–0	0–2	1–0	0–1	0–0	2–1	1–2	2–0	4–2	0–2	3–0	1–3	2–3	1–0	1–1	1–0	1–0	0–2		2–1
Zvezda Irkutsk	2–1	0–3	1–2	1–2	5–1	2–3	0–4	2–2	1–1	1–3	1–4	1–5	1–0	1–2	0–0	2–1	0–3	2–0	1–2	1–0	0–4	

Source: PFL (in Russian)
Legend: Blue = home team win; Yellow = draw; Red = away team win.

== Top goalscorers ==
Rank	Player	Team	Goals
1	(Russia) Denis Popov	Chernomorets / Torpedo	24
2	(Uzbekistan) Vladimir Shishelov	Zvezda / Ural	23
3	(Russia) Dmitri Akimov	Sibir / Rostov	22
4	(Russia) Vartan Mazalov	SKA Rostov-on-Don	21
4	(Russia) Aleksandr Yarkin	SKA-Khabarovsk	21
6	(Russia) Vadim Yanchuk	Nosta	20
7	(Moldova) Serghei Dadu	Alania	18
7	(Russia) Denis Zubko	Kuban	18
9	(Georgia (country)) Mikheil Ashvetia	Anzhi	17
9	(Russia) Spartak Gogniyev	KAMAZ	17

== See also ==
- 2008 Russian Premier League
