= Fyodor Milovanov =

Russian footballer (born 1979)

Personal information
- Full name: Fyodor Vladimirovich Milovanov
- Date of birth: 6 March 1979 (age 47)
- Place of birth: Voronezh, Russian SFSR
- Height: 1.86 m (6 ft 1 in)
- Position: Forward

Senior career*
Years	Team	Apps	(Gls)
1997	FC Rassvet Troitskoye	7	(0)
1999	FC Volochanin-89 Vyshny Volochyok	19	(2)
1999	FC Torpedo-2 Moscow	14	(0)
2000–2001	FC Tom Tomsk	23	(1)
2002–2003	FC Dynamo Makhachkala	42	(14)
2004	FC Vidnoye	10	(5)
2004	FC Ural Yekaterinburg	17	(9)
2005	FC Salyut-Energia Belgorod	6	(0)
2005	FC Spartak Lukhovitsy	13	(2)
2006	FC Spartak-MZhK Ryazan	13	(4)
2007	FC Dynamo Voronezh	27	(10)
2008	FC Fakel Voronezh (D4)		
2008	FC Dynamo Stavropol	32	(4)
2009	FC FSA Voronezh	19	(1)
- * Club domestic league appearances and goals

Fyodor Vladimirovich Milovanov (Russian: Фёдор Владимирович Милованов; born 6 March 1979) is a former Russian professional football player.

== Club career ==
He played in the Russian Football National League for FC Tom Tomsk in 2000.
