= Dmitri Bayda =

Russian footballer

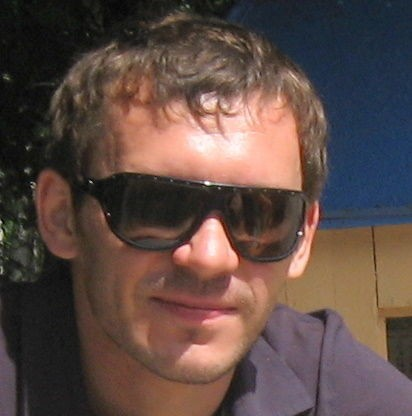

Personal information
- Full name: Dmitri Vladimirovich Bayda
- Date of birth: 5 November 1975 (age 50)
- Place of birth: Yuzhno-Sakhalinsk, Soviet Union
- Height: 1.78 m (5 ft 10 in)
- Position: Forward

Senior career*
Years	Team	Apps	(Gls)
1996	Lokomotiv Mineralnye Vody	30	(9)
1997–1998	Torpedo-Kadino Mogilev	36	(11)
1999	Gazovik Orenburg	25	(7)
2001	Dynamo Makhachkala	24	(14)
2002	Khimki	2	(0)
2002	Kuzbass-Dynamo Kemerovo	14	(3)
2003	Dynamo Barnaul	24	(6)
2004	Dynamo Makhachkala	17	(0)
2004–2005	Dynamo Barnaul	42	(25)
2006	Zvezda Irkutsk	29	(10)
2007	Metallurg Lipetsk	30	(10)
2008	Ryazan	34	(5)
2009	Sakhalin Yuzhno-Sakhalinsk	23	(5)
- * Club domestic league appearances and goals

Dmitri Vladimirovich Bayda (Russian: Дмитрий Владимирович Байда; born 5 November 1975) is a former Russian professional football player.

== Honours ==
- Russian Second Division Zone East best striker: 2005.
