= Andrei Volgin (footballer) =

Russian footballer

Personal information
- Full name: Andrei Olegovich Volgin
- Date of birth: 28 June 1988 (age 38)
- Place of birth: Kemerovo, Russian SFSR
- Height: 1.73 m (5 ft 8 in)
- Positions: Defender; midfielder

Youth career
- SDYuSShOR Kemerovo

Senior career*
Years	Team	Apps	(Gls)
2006–2007	FC Tom Tomsk	0	(0)
2008–2010	FC KUZBASS Kemerovo	61	(10)
2011–2013	FC Metallurg-Kuzbass Novokuznetsk	52	(11)
2013	FC Tyumen	7	(1)
2014–2015	FC Novokuznetsk	37	(9)
2016–2018	FC Chita	47	(7)
2018–2022	FC Kaluga	80	(21)
- * Club domestic league appearances and goals

Andrei Olegovich Volgin (Russian: Андрей Олегович Волгин; born 28 June 1988) is a Russian former professional football player.

== Club career ==
He made his Russian Football National League debut for FC Metallurg-Kuzbass Novokuznetsk on 10 July 2012 in a game against FC Neftekhimik Nizhnekamsk.
