= Pavel Safronov =

Russian footballer

Personal information
- Full name: Pavel Andreyevich Safronov
- Date of birth: 13 February 1989 (age 37)
- Place of birth: Tolyatti, Kuybyshev Oblast, Russian SFSR
- Height: 1.79 m (5 ft 10 in)
- Position: Forward

Senior career*
Years	Team	Apps	(Gls)
2007–2009	FC Lada Togliatti	30	(2)
2009–2010	FC Mashuk-KMV Pyatigorsk	29	(18)
2010	FC Torpedo Moscow	11	(8)
2011	FC Mashuk-KMV Pyatigorsk	8	(3)
2011–2012	FC Gubkin	8	(1)
2012–2013	FC Zvezda Ryazan	2	(1)
2013	FC Volgar Astrakhan	26	(2)
2014	FC Zenit-Izhevsk	8	(4)
2014–2016	FC KAMAZ Naberezhnye Chelny	46	(8)
2016–2017	FC Syzran-2003	18	(1)
2017	FC Lada-Togliatti	13	(0)
2018	FC Murom	0	(0)
- * Club domestic league appearances and goals

Pavel Andreyevich Safronov (Russian: Павел Андреевич Сафронов; born 13 February 1989) is a Russian former professional football player.

== Club career ==
He played two seasons in the Russian Football National League for FC Volgar Astrakhan and FC KAMAZ Naberezhnye Chelny.

== Honours ==
- Russian Second Division Zone South best player: 2010.
- Russian Second Division Zone South best scorer: 2010 (16 goals).
