= Pavel Vtyurin =

Russian footballer

Personal information
- Full name: Pavel Aleksandrovich Vtyurin
- Date of birth: 23 August 1981 (age 45)
- Place of birth: Vladimir, Russian SFSR
- Height: 1.87 m (6 ft 1 1/2 in)
- Positions: Forward; midfielder

Senior career*
Years	Team	Apps	(Gls)
1998–1999	FC Torpedo Vladimir	19	(0)
2000	FC Torpedo Vladimir (amateur)		
2001	FC Torpedo Vladimir	36	(5)
2002	FC Uralan Plus Moscow	33	(5)
2003–2004	FC Spartak Kostroma	62	(8)
2007–2012	FC Torpedo Vladimir	168	(29)
2012	FC Tekstilshchik Ivanovo	17	(2)
2013	FC Dolgoprudny	6	(2)
2013–2017	FC Torpedo Vladimir	100	(11)

International career
2003	Russia U-21	2	(0)
- * Club domestic league appearances and goals

Pavel Aleksandrovich Vtyurin (Russian: Павел Александрович Втюрин; born 23 August 1981) is a Russian former professional football player.

== Club career ==
He played in the Russian Football National League for FC Torpedo Vladimir in the 2011–12 season.
