= Ivan Luzhnikov =

Russian footballer

Personal information
- Full name: Ivan Andreyevich Luzhnikov
- Date of birth: 11 April 1980 (age 46)
- Place of birth: Moscow, Russian SFSR
- Height: 1.87 m (6 ft 1 1/2 in)
- Positions: Forward; midfielder

Youth career
- FShM-Torpedo Moscow

Senior career*
| Years | Team | Apps | (Gls) |
| 2001 | FC Metallurg Vyksa | 25 | (0) |
| 2004 | FC Dynamo Stavropol | 30 | (29) |
| 2005 | FC Fakel Voronezh | 10 | (1) |
| 2006 | FC Chernomorets Novorossiysk | 12 | (3) |
| 2006 | FC Lobnya-Alla Lobnya | 13 | (9) |
| 2007 | FC Chernomorets Novorossiysk | 25 | (17) |
| 2008 | FC Dynamo Saint Petersburg | 18 | (3) |
| 2009 | FC Mordovia Saransk | 14 | (2) |
| 2009–2010 | FC Tyumen | 25 | (17) |
| 2011 | FC Volga Ulyanovsk | 22 | (8) |
| 2012 | FC Sakhalin Yuzhno-Sakhalinsk | 7 | (1) |
- * Club domestic league appearances and goals

Ivan Andreyevich Luzhnikov (Russian: Иван Андреевич Лужников; born 11 April 1980) is a former Russian professional football player.

== Club career ==
He played in the Russian Football National League for FC Fakel Voronezh in 2005.

== Honours ==
- Russian Second Division Zone South top scorer: 2004 (29 goals).
