= Lyepyel =

Town in Vitebsk Region, Belarus

Lyepyel Лепель
- Town
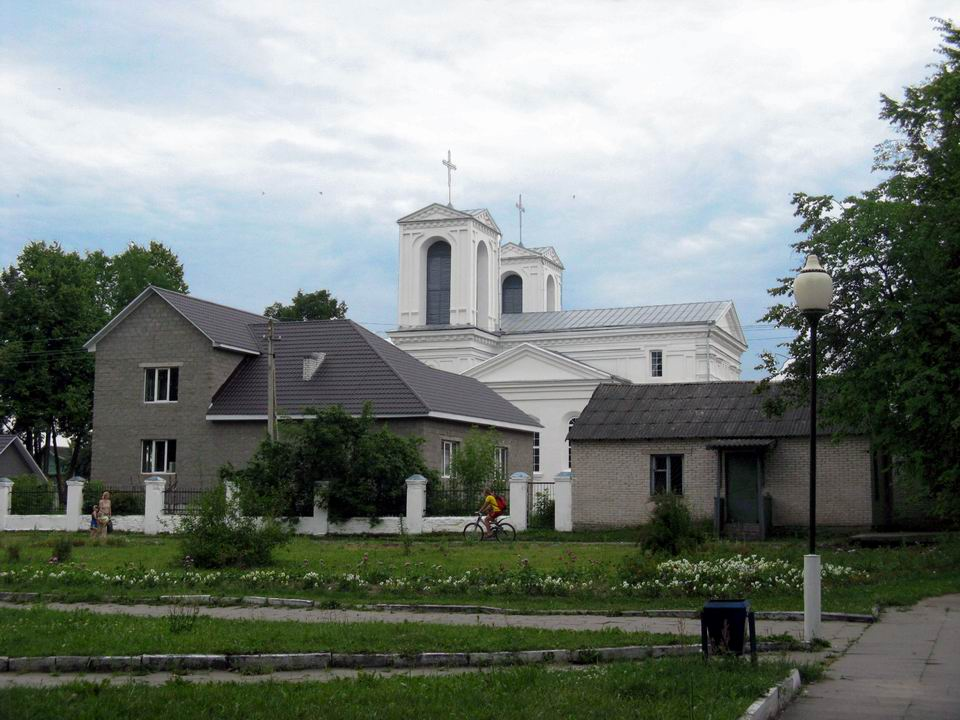

- Flag Coat of arms

- Location within Belarus
- Coordinates: 54°52′30″N 28°41′40″E
- Country: Belarus
- Region: Vitebsk Region
- District: Lyepyel District
- First mentioned: 1439

Population (2025)
  - Total: 16,895
- Time zone: UTC+3 (MSK)
- Postal code: 211174
- Area code: +375 2132
- License plate: 2
- Website: http://lepel.vitebsk-region.gov.by/

Lyepyel or Lepel (Note: Belarusian: Лепель, romanized: Liepieĺ; Russian: Лепель, IPA: [ˈlʲepʲɪlʲ]; Polish: Lepel; Yiddish: ליעפּליע, romanized: Li'epli'e.) is a town in Vitebsk Region, Belarus, located near Lyepyel Lake on the Vula River. It serves as the administrative center of Lyepyel District. Its population in the 1998 census was 19,400. As of 2025, it has a population of 16,895.

== Name ==
There are three theories about the origin of the name Lepel. The first is that the name 'Lepel' come from the word "lepene" which means "lake between the lime-groves". The second is that the name comes from the Belarusian word "лепей" meaning "the best place to live in". The third theory for the name Lepel is that it derives from the Belarusian word "ляпiць" meaning "well-developed pottery".

== History ==
The first known mention of Lepel dates back to 1439. In the 15th century, the town belonged to the Grand Duchy of Lithuania. In 1439, thanks to efforts of a Roman Catholic priest, Kucharski, Grand Lithuanian Duke Sigismund Kestutaitis' son Michael gave Lepel to the Vitebsk Roman Catholic church. In 1503, it the donation was confirmed by King Alexander Jagiellon. In 1541 King Sigismund I the Old included the possessions of the Vitebsk Catholic parish, including Lepel, into the Diocese of Wilno with the approval of the Pope.

After Polatsk was captured by the Muscovite army in 1563, the Diocese of Wilno was no longer able to protect its property from Muscovite attacks. The decision was made to donate Lepel to King Sigismund II Augustus on the erroneous assumption that the king would return the gift by awarding the diocese with other property of the same value. Instead, the king gave the property by way of life tenure to Yury Zenovich, the castellan of Smolensk. After Yury Zenovich died, Sigismund gave the town to voivode of Połock Mikołaj Dorohostajski. After the liberation of Polatsk from Russian occupation, Lepel returned to Polish King Stephen Báthory, who restored it to the Diocese of Wilno. Within the Polish–Lithuanian Commonwealth it was administratively located in the Połock Voivodeship.

It remained difficult for the diocese to protect Lepel from foreign invasions and thus the decision was made in 1586 to sell it to Lew Sapieha, a leading politician. Sapieha eventually donated Lepel in 1609 to Bernardine nuns in Vilnius (Wilno) who lived next to St. Michael's Church, a donation confirmed in 1617.

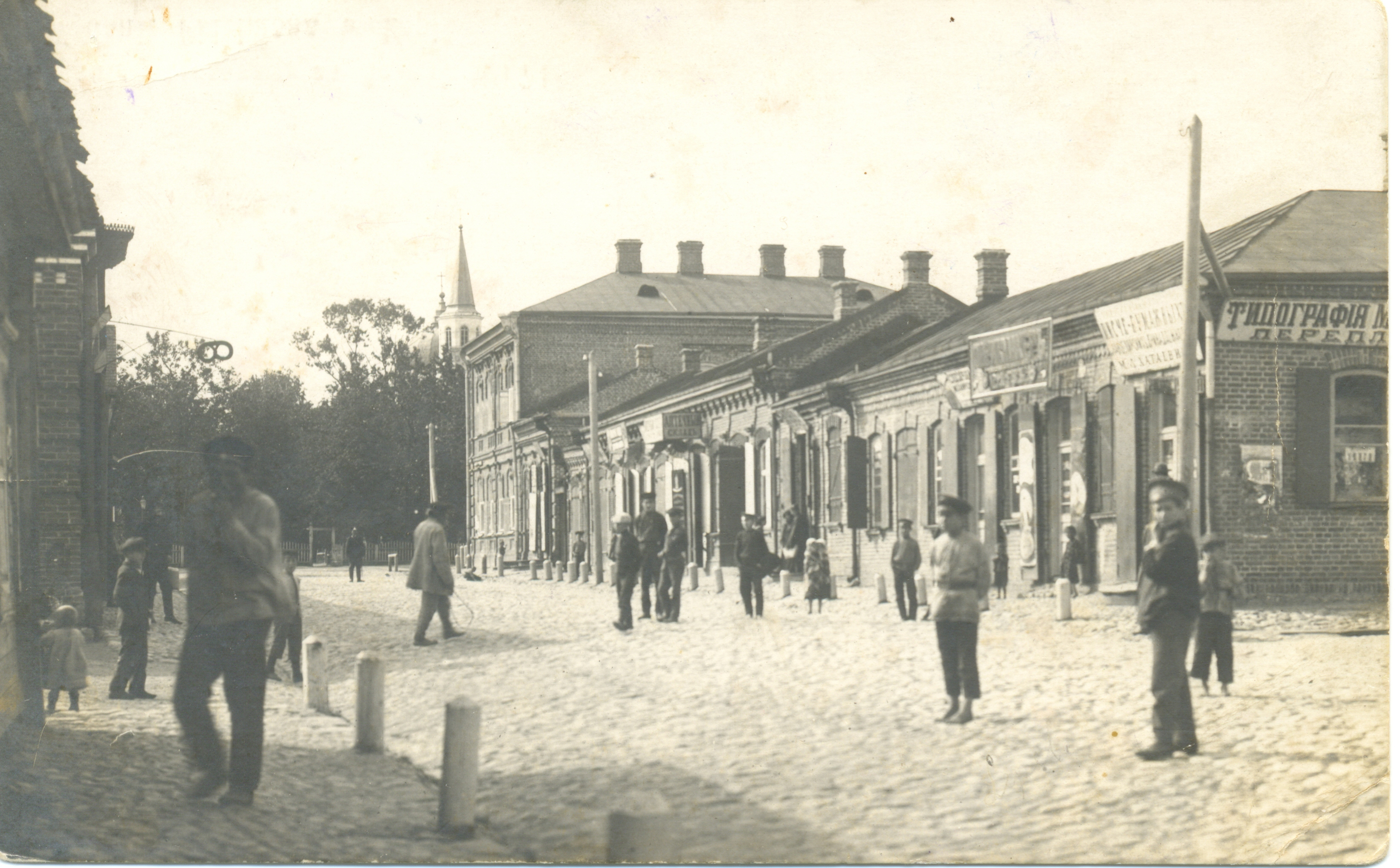
Lepel in the early 20th century

The town was annexed by Russia in the Second Partition of Poland in 1793. In 1802 Lepel became a county seat of the Vitebsk Governorate. The town suffered greatly in the 1812 French invasion of Russia due to the passing troops razing many buildings to the ground. On 9 September 1852 Lepel was awarded its own coat of arms. Poet Jan Czeczot, friend of Adam Mickiewicz, worked as an engineer on the Berezina Canal in Lepel between 1833 and 1839. In 1880, the population of Lepel consisted of 5,284 people, including 2,458 Jews, 2,281 Orthodox, and 536 Roman Catholics.

By 1913 Lepel had lost its strategic and economic importance and was a quiet regional town center.

On November 10, 1919 in the neighbourhood of Lepel there was a clash between the company of the 13th Infantry Regiment of the Polish Army sitting in an ambush and the Soviet troops advancing into the region. The fighting was successful for the Poles though their commanding officer, lieutenant Stanisław Jacheć, was the only Polish victim of the clash. Heavy fighting between the Bolshevik troops and the Polish Army's 30th regiment of the Rifles of Kaniów of the XX brigade continued through November 1919 and the Polish-Soviet frontline was established there until spring 1920.

=== World War II ===
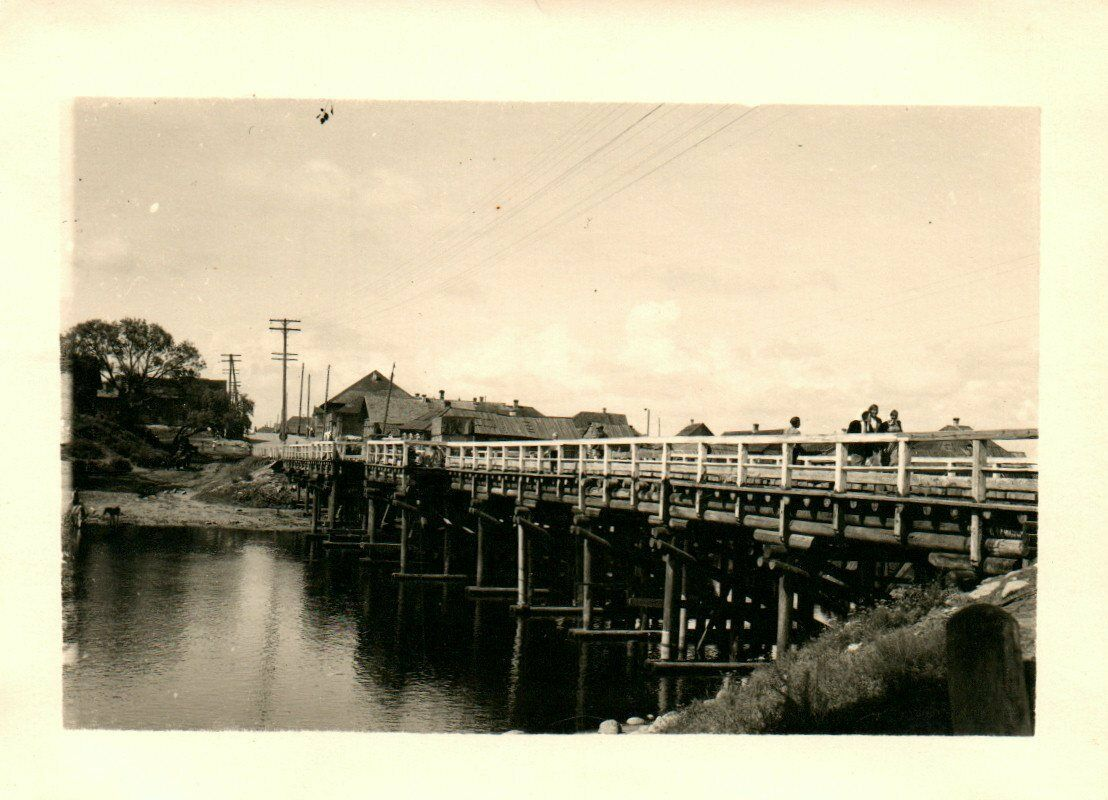
Lepel in 1941

The headquarters of the Soviet 11th Army was based in Lepel shortly before the Soviet invasion of Poland at the start of World War II in September 1939. The 11th Army attacked towards the southern Wilno Region and Grodno.

On 22 June 1941, Operation Barbarossa, the German invasion of the Soviet Union, began. Lepiel was captured by the rapidly advancing German troops on 3 July. While the Lepel's Jewish population had once been as high as 3,379 (53.7%) in 1897, by 1941 this had dwindled to only 1,919, or 13.6 percent of the townspeople. The German occupation authorities created a ghetto and appointed a Jewish elder. On February 28, 1942, almost all of the 1,000 residents remaining in the ghetto were shot by an Einsatzgruppe. The Germans also operated a Nazi prison and briefly the AGSSt 8 assembly center for Soviet prisoners of war in the town. During Operation Bagration, the summer 1944 Soviet strategic offensive in Belarus, Lepiel was liberated on 3 July.

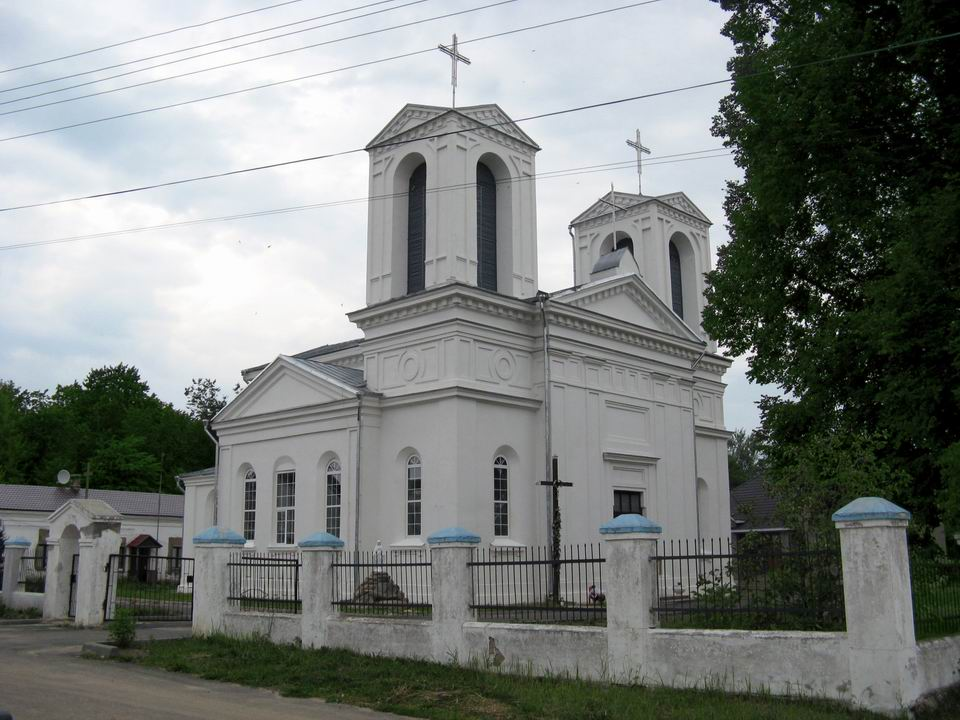
St. Casimir's Catholic Church

== Education ==
Lepel has:

- 4 secondary schools
- An agrotechnical college
- A professional college

== Transportation ==
Lepel is situated on a highway connecting Minsk and Vitebsk, and is 115 km from Vitebsk and 155 km from Minsk. The town is connected by road to Polatsk and by rail to Orsha.

== Notable people ==
- Yawhen Kalinin (born 1993), footballer
- Todar Klaštorny (1903 - 1937), Belarusian romantic poet, translator and a victim of Stalin’s purges
- Ivan Matskevich (born 1991), handballer
- Anastasiya Mazgo (born 1995), handballer
- Vladimir Motyl (1927-2010), director
- Yauheni Zharnasek (born 1987), weightlifter

== See also ==
- Old Lyepyel
