= Vladislav Mayorov =

Russian footballer

Personal information
- Full name: Vladislav Nikolayevich Mayorov
- Date of birth: 12 November 1976 (age 49)
- Place of birth: Ryazan, Russian SFSR
- Height: 1.91 m (6 ft 3 in)
- Positions: Midfielder; forward

Senior career*
Years	Team	Apps	(Gls)
1995–1998	FC Spartak Ryazan	119	(21)
1998	FC Zhemchuzhina Sochi	2	(0)
1998–1999	FC Kryvbas Kryvyi Rih	11	(2)
1998–2000	FC Kryvbas-2 Kryvyi Rih	6	(3)
2002–2005	FC Ryazan-Agrokomplekt Ryazan	123	(80)
2006–2007	FC Spartak-MZhK Ryazan	30	(14)
2007–2008	FC Ryazan	31	(15)
- * Club domestic league appearances and goals

Vladislav Nikolayevich Mayorov (Russian: Владислав Николаевич Майоров; born 12 November 1976) is a former Russian professional footballer.

== Honours ==
- Ukrainian Premier League bronze: 1999.
