= Eduard Uchurov =

Russian footballer

Personal information
- Full name: Eduard Anatolyevich Uchurov
- Date of birth: 20 December 1979 (age 46)
- Place of birth: Elista, Russian SFSR
- Height: 1.73 m (5 ft 8 in)
- Positions: Midfielder; defender

Senior career*
| Years | Team | Apps | (Gls) |
| 1997–1998 | FC Uralan Elista | 0 | (0) |
| 1999 | FC Kavkazkabel Prokhladny | 10 | (0) |
| 2001 | FC Uralan Elista | 0 | (0) |
| 2001 | FC Kavkazkabel Prokhladny | 28 | (1) |
| 2002–2006 | FC Elista | 42 | (6) |
| 2006 | FC Spartak-UGP Anapa | 12 | (1) |
| 2007 | FC Volga Nizhny Novgorod | 16 | (2) |
| 2008 | FC Nizhny Novgorod | 10 | (0) |
| 2008 | FC Volgar-Gazprom-2 Astrakhan | 19 | (9) |
| 2009 | FC Ordabasy | 19 | (1) |
| 2010 | FC Radian-Baikal Irkutsk | 28 | (9) |
| 2011–2012 | FC Metallurg-Kuzbass Novokuznetsk | 38 | (5) |
| 2012 | FC Luch-Energiya Vladivostok | 9 | (0) |
| 2013–2014 | FC Dynamo Bryansk | 21 | (1) |
- * Club domestic league appearances and goals

Eduard Anatolyevich Uchurov (Russian: Эдуард Анатольевич Учуров; born 20 December 1979) is a former Russian professional footballer.
