= Dmitri Vakulich =

Russian footballer

Personal information
- Full name: Dmitri Nikolayevich Vakulich
- Date of birth: 25 April 1990 (age 36)
- Place of birth: Kuybyshev, Russian SFSR
- Height: 1.78 m (5 ft 10 in)
- Position: Forward

Youth career
- Konoplyov football academy

Senior career*
Years	Team	Apps	(Gls)
2008	FC Academia Dimitrovgrad	34	(5)
2009	FC Togliatti	26	(0)
2010	FC Akademiya Togliatti	21	(1)
2011	FC Karelia Petrozavodsk	33	(17)
2012	FC Fakel Voronezh	4	(0)
2012–2013	FC Petrotrest St. Petersburg	4	(0)
2012	→ FC Karelia Petrozavodsk (loan)	10	(1)
2013	FC Kaluga	15	(3)
2014	FC Lada-Togliatti Togliatti	8	(0)
2014	FC Khimki	2	(0)
- * Club domestic league appearances and goals

Dmitri Nikolayevich Vakulich (Russian: Дмитрий Николаевич Вакулич; born 25 April 1990) is a former Russian professional football player.

== Club career ==
He made his Russian Football National League debut for FC Fakel Voronezh on 2 May 2012 in a game against FC Chernomorets Novorossiysk.
