= Maksim Samoylov =

Russian footballer (1981–2024)

Personal information
- Full name: Maksim Sergeyevich Samoylov
- Date of birth: 25 May 1981
- Date of death: 5 October 2024 (aged 43)
- Place of death: Magnitogorsk, Russia
- Height: 1.80 m (5 ft 11 in)
- Positions: Midfielder; forward

Senior career*
Years	Team	Apps	(Gls)
1999–2000	FC Dynamo Izhevsk	37	(5)
2000–2005	FC Gazovik-Gazprom Izhevsk	126	(4)
2007	FC SOYUZ-Gazprom Izhevsk	25	(8)
2008	FC Volga Ulyanovsk	40	(2)
2009–2010	FC SOYUZ-Gazprom Izhevsk	46	(8)
2011	FC Chelyabinsk	14	(0)
2011	FC Volga Ulyanovsk	5	(0)
2012	FC Khimik Dzerzhinsk	9	(0)
2012–2013	FC Zenit-Izhevsk	9	(0)
- * Club domestic league appearances and goals

Maksim Sergeyevich Samoylov (Russian: Максим Серге́евич Самойлов; 25 May 1981 – 5 October 2024) was a Russian professional footballer who played as a midfielder or forward.

== Career ==
Samoylov made his Russian Football National League debut for FC Gazovik-Gazprom Izhevsk on 17 August 2000 in a game against FC Metallurg Krasnoyarsk.

== Death ==
Samoylov suffered a heart attack and died on 5 October 2024, at the age of 43.
