= Kirill Kochkayev =

Russian footballer

Personal information
- Full name: Kirill Sergeyevich Kochkayev
- Date of birth: 10 June 1984 (age 42)
- Place of birth: Krasnokamensk, Zabaykalsky Krai, Russian SFSR
- Height: 1.87 m (6 ft 1 1/2 in)
- Position: Forward

Senior career*
Years	Team	Apps	(Gls)
2000–2004	FC Lokomotiv Chita	73	(5)
2005	FC Chkalovets-1936 Novosibirsk	25	(2)
2006	FC Alma-Ata	26	(4)
2007	Astana	23	(2)
2008	FC Atyrau	12	(1)
2008	FC Chita	11	(1)
2009	FC Gornyak Uchaly	13	(0)
2010	FC Chita	20	(9)
- * Club domestic league appearances and goals

Kirill Sergeyevich Kochkayev (Russian: Кирилл Серге́евич Кочкаев; born 10 June 1984) is a former Russian professional footballer.

== Club career ==
He played 5 seasons in the Russian Football National League for FC Lokomotiv Chita and FC Chkalovets-1936 Novosibirsk before moving to the Kazakhstan Premier League for the next 3 seasons.
