= Aleksandr Golubev (intelligence officer) =

Soviet and Russian intelligence officer (1936–2020)

- Native name: Александр Титович Голубев
- Born: 9 February 1936; Pakhomlevichi, Lepiel District, Vitebsk Region, Byelorussian SFSR, Soviet Union
- Died: 8 February 2020 (aged 83) Moscow, Russia
- Allegiance: USSR; Russia
- Branch: KGB; Foreign Intelligence Service
- Rank: Lieutenant General
- Awards: Order of Military Merit; Order of Honour; Order of the Red Banner; Order of the Red Star; Order of the Badge of Honour

Aleksandr Titovich Golubev (Russian: Александр Титович Голубев; 9 February 1936 – 8 February 2020) was a Soviet and later Russian intelligence officer who held a number of posts in the KGB and the Foreign Intelligence Service, reaching the rank of lieutenant general.

Born into a peasant family in the Byelorussian SFSR, Golubev grew up during the war years, and spent his early career in the navy, and combining working as a machinist with political activity with the Komsomol. He joined the KGB in 1959 and studied English and Persian, graduating from domestic intelligence work to foreign intelligence as part of the First Chief Directorate. Golubev developed particular expertise in Afghani affairs, and had a role in planning and then carrying out Operation Storm-333, the overthrow of incumbent Afghan president Hafizullah Amin in 1979. As part of the operation Golubev commanded a detachment of Spetsnaz troops during the military assault on Amin's headquarters at the Tajbeg Palace. He then served for a time as KGB resident in Istanbul, before rising through several posts in the KGB's command prior to the dissolution of the Soviet Union.

Golubev continued to work in the security services of the Russian Federation, serving as a head of department of the Foreign Intelligence Service, and a senior consultant to the director of the Foreign Intelligence Service. He retired with the rank of general-lieutenant in 2001, and was head of the Council of Veterans of the Foreign Intelligence Service of the Russian Federation for a number of years. He died in 2020, having received numerous awards and honours over his career in intelligence.

== Early life and service ==
Golubev was born into a peasant family on 9 February 1936, in the village of Pakhomlevichi, Lepiel District, in Vitebsk Region, then part of the Byelorussian SFSR, in the Soviet Union. He grew up during the Axis invasion and occupation of parts of the Soviet Union's western regions, and after graduating from high school, went to serve in the Baltic Fleet from 1955. He then worked as a milling machine operator at a tractor factory in Ordzhonikidze, North Ossetia, and was elected to the city's Komsomol committee.

== Intelligence work ==
Golubev joined the KGB in 1959 and initially studied at the KGB's Institute of Foreign Languages, until its dissolution in 1960. He then moved to the Higher Red Banner School of the KGB and studied Persian and English, graduating in 1964. He was initially assigned to domestic KGB operations in North Ossetia, but also took overseas trips to Iraq, Kuwait and Iran. He took the Improvement courses for KGB officers in 1967 and from 1969 onwards was working in foreign intelligence as part of the First Chief Directorate. He served as an operational officer and then a resident in several overseas postings, including Iran, and in 1975 became head of the Afghan directorate of the 3rd department of the K Department of KGB's First Chief Directorate. Golubev was in Afghanistan during the buildup to the Soviet intervention there and the beginning of the Soviet–Afghan War.

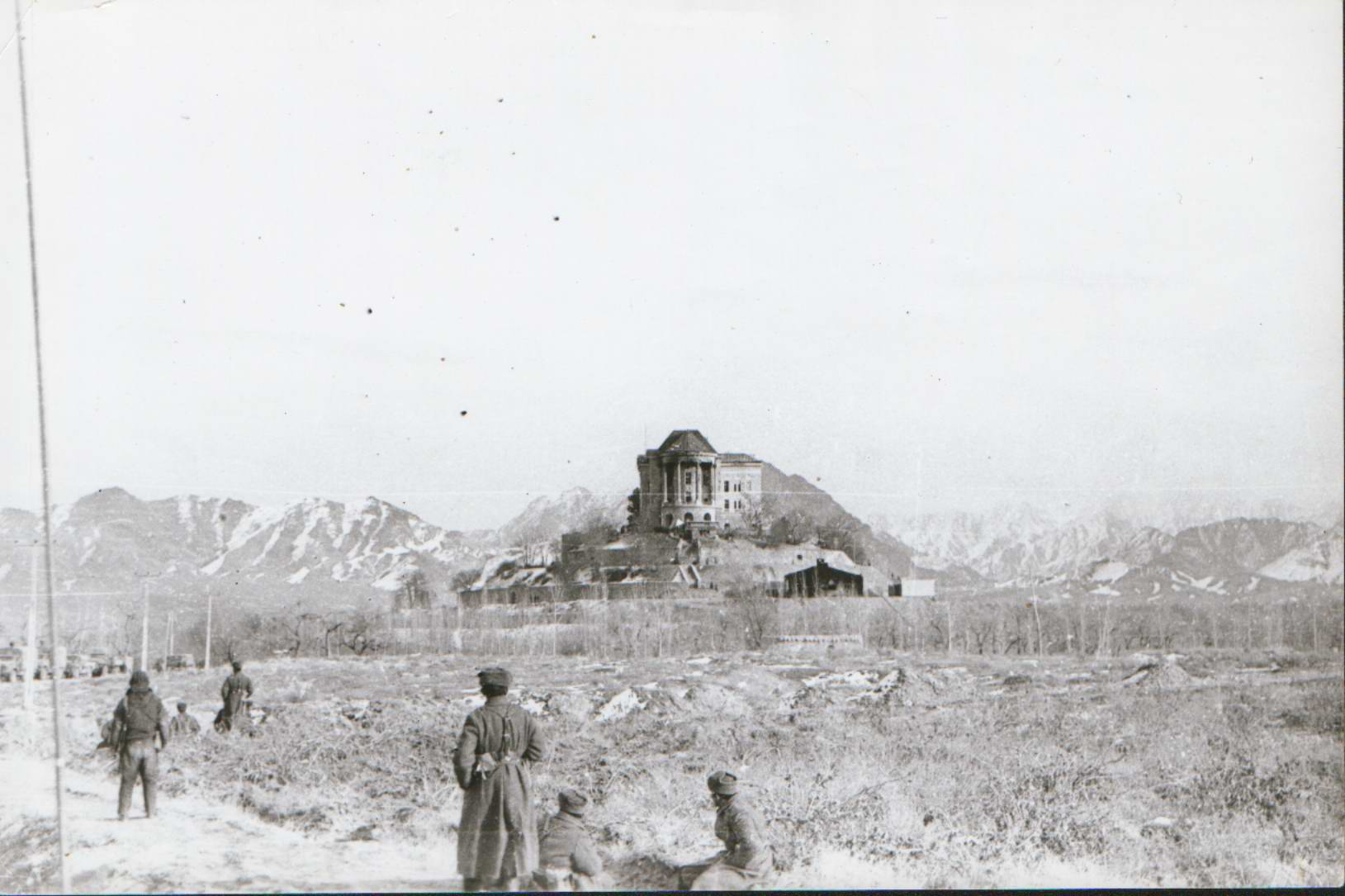
The Tajbeg Palace, pictured after the Soviet assault on 27 December 1979. Golubev commanded a detachment of Spetsnaz troops during the operation.

Golubev had a role in planning and then carrying out Operation Storm-333, the overthrow of incumbent president Hafizullah Amin, in November and December 1979. In late November Golubev, then with the rank of colonel, took command of a detachment of the Zenit Spetsnaz group which had arrived in Bagram disguised as technical workers. Golubev commanded the group during the military assault on Amin's headquarters at the Tajbeg Palace.

In 1981 Golubev became KGB resident in Istanbul, remaining there until 1987, when he returned to the USSR to become head of the First Chief Directorate's K Department. In 1989 he became head of the First Chief Directorate's 20th department, serving as such until October 1991. The following month he became head of the KGB of the Russian Soviet Federative Socialist Republic's intelligence department of the KGB of the RSFSR, and then of the Main Intelligence Directorate of the Federal Security Agency of the RSFSR until December 1991.

Following the dissolution of the Soviet Union in December 1991, Golubev continued to work in the security services of the Russian Federation. From 1993 he was a head of department of the Foreign Intelligence Service, and from June 1997 he was a senior consultant of the Group of Consultants to the director of the Foreign Intelligence Service. He had been promoted to general-major in December 1990, and to general-lieutenant in December 1993. In 1997 he became a Member of the Interdepartmental Commission of the Security Council of the Russian Federation on Border Policy.

== Retirement ==
Golubev retired with the rank of general-lieutenant in 2001. In retirement he was head of the Council of Veterans of the Foreign Intelligence Service of the Russian Federation for a number of years. He was married, with two sons. Golubev died in Moscow on 8 February 2020 at the age of 83.

Over his career he had received the Order of Military Merit, the Order of the Red Banner, the Order of the Red Star and the Order of the Badge of Honour, as well as medals from the Soviet Union, Russia and Afghanistan, in addition to the badges of Honoured Officer of the Foreign Intelligence of the Russian Federation, Honoured State Security Officer and "For Service in Intelligence".
