= Oleg Makeyev =

Russian footballer and coach

Personal information
- Full name: Oleg Aleksandrovich Makeyev
- Date of birth: 24 February 1978 (age 48)
- Place of birth: Dzerzhinsk, Russian SFSR
- Height: 1.79 m (5 ft 10 in)
- Position: Forward

Youth career
- 1991–1996: Khimik Dzerzhinsk

Senior career*
Years	Team	Apps	(Gls)
1996–1997	Uran Dzerzhinsk		
1998–2002	Khimik Dzerzhinsk	107	(29)
2003–2005	FC Energetik Uren	102	(32)
2006–2007	Khimik Dzerzhinsk (amateur)		
2008–2014	Khimik Dzerzhinsk	147	(31)
2013–2015	Khimik-Tosol-Sintez Dzerzhinsk (amateur)		

Managerial career
- 2014: Metallurg Vyksa (assistant)
- 2016: Dzerzhinsk-TS
- 2018–2019: Tom Tomsk (assistant)
- 2021: Volna Kovernino (assistant)
- 2021–2023: Pari Nizhny Novgorod (assistant)
- 2024–2025: Volna Nizhny Novgorod Oblast
- 2025: SShOR 8 Nizhny Novgorod
- 2026: Pobeda Nizhny Novgorod
- * Club domestic league appearances and goals

Oleg Aleksandrovich Makeyev (Russian: Олег Александрович Макеев; born 24 February 1978) is a Russian professional football coach and a former player.

== Club career ==
Makeyev played in the Russian Football National League for Khimik Dzerzhinsk in the 2013–14 season.
