= Murat Khotov =

Russian footballer

Personal information
- Full name: Murat Ansorbiyevich Khotov
- Date of birth: 2 June 1987 (age 39)
- Place of birth: Netrizovo, Smolensk Oblast, Russian SFSR
- Height: 1.77 m (5 ft 9 1/2 in)
- Position: Forward

Senior career*
| Years | Team | Apps | (Gls) |
| 2006–2007 | Smolensk | 49 | (5) |
| 2008–2009 | Avangard Kursk | 51 | (3) |
| 2010–2011 | Dnepr Smolensk | 63 | (17) |
| 2012 | Petrotrest Saint Petersburg | 17 | (1) |
| 2013–2015 | Naftan Novopolotsk | 85 | (2) |
| 2016–2017 | Dnepr Mogilev | 40 | (23) |
| 2017–2019 | Slutsk | 47 | (6) |
| 2020 | Gomel | 9 | (0) |
| 2021 | Dnepr Mogilev | 17 | (4) |
- * Club domestic league appearances and goals as of 31 December 2021

Murat Ansorbiyevich Khotov (Russian: Мурат Ансорбиевич Хотов; born 2 June 1987) is a Russian former professional football player.
