= Aleksei Buznyakov =

Russian professional football player

Personal information
- Full name: Aleksei Vasilyevich Buznyakov
- Date of birth: 13 February 1985 (age 41)
- Place of birth: Rostov-on-Don, Russian SFSR
- Height: 1.75 m (5 ft 9 in)
- Positions: Midfielder; forward

Senior career*
Years	Team	Apps	(Gls)
2002–2003	FC Rotor-2 Volgograd (amateur)		
2004–2005	FC Rotor-2 Volgograd	34	(2)
2006	FC Rotor Volgograd	11	(1)
2006	FC Metallurg Krasnoyarsk	19	(0)
2007	FC Yunit Samara	14	(2)
2007	FC Metallurg Krasnoyarsk	12	(0)
2008	FC Dynamo-Voronezh Voronezh	16	(1)
2008	FC Yelets	10	(2)
2009	FC Sulin Krasny Sulin		
2009–2010	FC SKA Rostov-on-Don	43	(19)
2011–2012	FC Tyumen	36	(9)
2012–2013	FC Amur-2010 Blagoveshchensk	19	(8)
2013	FC Khimik Belorechensk (amateur)		
2013–2014	FC SKVO Rostov-on-Don	22	(1)
2014–2017	FC Smena Komsomolsk-na-Amure	64	(11)
2017–2019	FC Rostselmash Rostov-on-Don (amateur)		
- * Club domestic league appearances and goals

Aleksei Vasilyevich Buznyakov (Russian: Алексей Васильевич Бузняков; born 13 February 1985) is a Russian former professional football player.

== Club career ==
He played in the Russian Football National League for FC Metallurg Krasnoyarsk in 2006.
