= Rafael Zangionov =

Russian footballer

Personal information
- Full name: Rafael Yuryevich Zangionov
- Date of birth: 5 August 1978 (age 48)
- Height: 1.65 m (5 ft 5 in)
- Position: Forward

Senior career*
Years	Team	Apps	(Gls)
1994	FC Iriston Mozdok	5	(0)
1994–1998	Anderlecht	0	(0)
1998–1999	K.R.C. Harelbeke	13	(2)
2000	FC Anzhi Makhachkala	3	(1)
2001	FC Neftekhimik Nizhnekamsk	13	(1)
2001	FC Alania Vladikavkaz (reserves)		
2002	FC Uralan Plus Moscow	19	(8)
2002–2005	FC Lukoil Chelyabinsk	98	(27)
2006	FC Zvezda Irkutsk	32	(5)
2007–2008	FC Metallurg Lipetsk	58	(11)
2009	FC Gornyak Uchaly	26	(4)
2010	FC Sokol Saratov	12	(2)

International career
1999	Russia U-21	3	(0)
- * Club domestic league appearances and goals

Rafael Yuryevich Zangionov (Russian: Рафаэль Юрьевич Зангионов; born 5 August 1978) is a Russian former professional footballer.

== Club career ==
He made his debut in the Russian Premier League in 2000 for FC Anzhi Makhachkala.

== Honours ==
- Russian Cup finalist: 2001 (played for FC Anzhi Makhachkala in the Round of 32 and Round of 16 games of the 2000/01 tournament).
- Russian Second Division Zone Ural/Povolzhye best midfielder: 2004.
