= Ruslan Zyazikov =

Russian footballer

Personal information
- Full name: Ruslan Magametaliyevich Zyazikov
- Date of birth: 13 December 1984 (age 41)
- Place of birth: Novosibirsk Oblast, Russian SFSR
- Height: 1.80 m (5 ft 11 in)
- Position: Striker

Senior career*
Years	Team	Apps	(Gls)
2004–2005	FC Angusht Nazran	4	(0)
2006	FC Magas-IGU Nazran		
2007	FC Angusht Nazran (amateur)		
2009–2015	FC Angusht Nazran	132	(29)
2015	FC Stroymarket Nazran		
2016–2017	FC Angusht Nazran	20	(2)
2018–2019	FC Angusht Nazran	10	(0)
- * Club domestic league appearances and goals

Ruslan Magametaliyevich Zyazikov (Russian: Руслан Магаметалиевич Зязиков; born 13 December 1984) is a Russian former professional football player.

== Club career ==
He played in the Russian Football National League for FC Angusht Nazran in the 2013–14 season.
