= Georgi Smurov =

Russian footballer (born 1983)

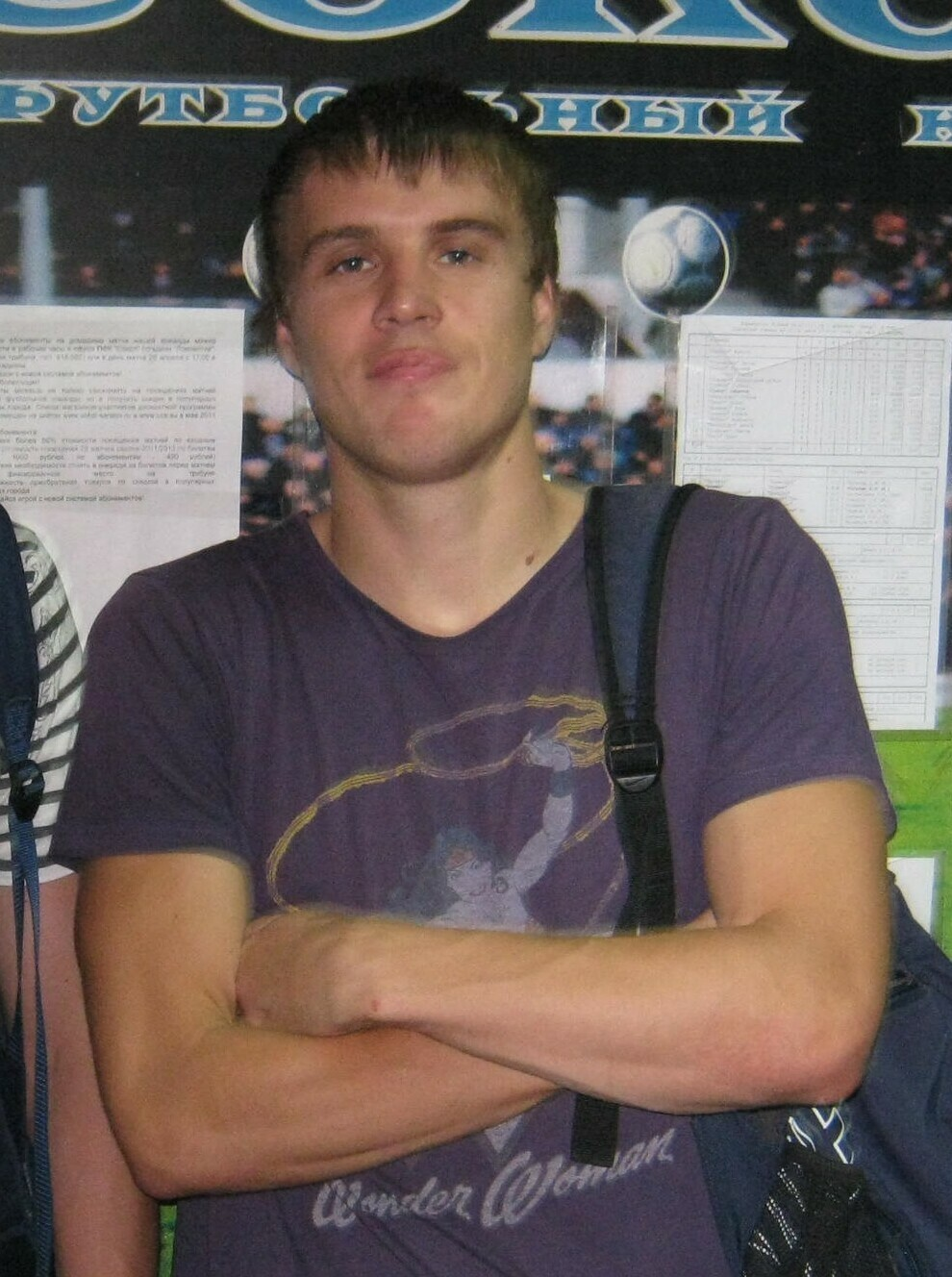
- Smurov in 2012

Personal information
- Full name: Georgi Vladimirovich Smurov
- Date of birth: 29 May 1983 (age 43)
- Place of birth: Volzhsky, Volgograd Oblast, Russian SFSR
- Height: 1.82 m (6 ft 0 in)
- Position: Midfielder

Senior career*
Years	Team	Apps	(Gls)
2002–2005	FC Rostov (reserves)		
2005	FC Rostov	1	(0)
2006–2007	FC Taganrog	40	(18)
2008–2009	FC SKA Rostov-on-Don	17	(2)
2008	→ FC Volga Nizhny Novgorod (loan)	10	(3)
2009–2010	FC Avangard Kursk	32	(9)
2011	FC Sokol Saratov	22	(16)
2012	FC Chernomorets Novorossiysk	1	(0)
2012–2013	FC Sokol Saratov	20	(1)
2013	FC SKVO Rostov-on-Don	23	(9)
2014	FC Dynamo Saint Petersburg	3	(0)
2014	FC Vybor-Kurbatovo Voronezh	3	(0)
2014–2015	FC MITOS Novocherkassk	22	(3)
- * Club domestic league appearances and goals

Georgi Vladimirovich Smurov (Russian: Георгий Владимирович Смуров; born 29 May 1983) is a Russian former professional footballer.

== Club career ==
He made his debut in the Russian Premier League in 2005 for FC Rostov.
