= Aleksei Antonnikov =

Russian professional football player

Personal information
- Full name: Aleksei Konstantinovich Antonnikov
- Date of birth: 5 December 1983 (age 42)
- Place of birth: Dubrovka, Leningrad Oblast, Russian SFSR
- Height: 1.75 m (5 ft 9 in)
- Positions: Midfielder; forward

Senior career*
Years	Team	Apps	(Gls)
2001–2002	FC Fabus Bronnitsy	19	(2)
2004–2006	FC Spartak Shchyolkovo	73	(15)
2007	FC Lukhovitsy	27	(11)
2008–2009	FC Nosta Novotroitsk	47	(6)
2009	FC Salyut-Energia Belgorod	11	(0)
2010	FC Tyumen	17	(1)
2011–2012	FC Volga Tver	41	(16)
2012–2013	FC Zenit Penza	29	(12)
2013–2014	FC Khimki	29	(8)
2014	FC Zenit-Izhevsk Izhevsk	12	(1)
2015–2019	FC Odintsovo		
- * Club domestic league appearances and goals

Aleksei Konstantinovich Antonnikov (Russian: Алексей Константинович Антонников; born 5 December 1983) is a former Russian professional football player.

== Club career ==
He played two seasons in the Russian Football National League for FC Nosta Novotroitsk and FC Salyut-Energia Belgorod.
