= Zhumaldin Karatlyashev =

Russian footballer

Personal information
- Full name: Zhumaldin Mukhamedovich Karatlyashev
- Date of birth: 11 January 1982 (age 44)
- Place of birth: Shalushka, Kabardino-Balkaria, Russian SFSR
- Height: 1.76 m (5 ft 9 1/2 in)
- Position: Forward

Senior career*
Years	Team	Apps	(Gls)
2001	FC Nart Nartkala	33	(3)
2002	FC Druzhba Maykop	30	(2)
2003	PFC Spartak Nalchik	1	(0)
2003	FC Kavkazkabel Prokhladny	13	(3)
2004	FC Torpedo Volzhsky	4	(4)
2005	FC Kavkazkabel Prokhladny (amateur)		
2005	FC Torpedo Volzhsky	11	(3)
2006	FC Gazovik Orenburg	0	(0)
2007–2008	FC Kavkaztransgaz-2005 Ryzdvyany	44	(22)
2008–2011	FC Chernomorets Novorossiysk	91	(17)
2012	FC Gubkin	9	(1)
2012–2013	FC Zvezda Ryazan	32	(8)
2013–2014	FC Astrakhan	13	(0)
- * Club domestic league appearances and goals

Zhumaldin Mukhamedovich Karatlyashev (Russian: Жумалдин Мухамедович Каратляшев; born 11 January 1982) is a former Russian professional football player.

== Club career ==
He played 4 seasons in the Russian Football National League for PFC Spartak Nalchik and FC Chernomorets Novorossiysk.
