= Vasili Brovin =

Russian professional footballer

Personal information
- Full name: Vasili Aleksandrovich Brovin
- Date of birth: 25 March 1982 (age 44)
- Place of birth: Sverdlovsk, Russian SFSR
- Height: 1.71 m (5 ft 7 1/2 in)
- Position: Midfielder

Youth career
- FC Uralmash Yekaterinburg

Senior career*
Years	Team	Apps	(Gls)
2000–2002	FC Lada Togliatti	80	(12)
2003	FC Rostov	10	(0)
2004	FC Baltika Kaliningrad	15	(0)
2005–2007	FC KAMAZ Naberezhnye Chelny	3	(0)
2006	→ FC Spartak Lukhovitsy (loan)	31	(8)
2007	→ FC Sodovik Sterlitamak (loan)	20	(1)
2007–2009	FC Mashuk-KMV Pyatigorsk	44	(1)
2009	→ FC Gornyak Uchaly (loan)	2	(0)
2010	FC Dynamo Stavropol	21	(9)
2011	FC Taganrog	24	(1)
2012–2013	FC Torpedo Armavir	32	(2)
2013	FC Khimki	13	(0)
- * Club domestic league appearances and goals

Vasili Aleksandrovich Brovin (Russian: Василий Александрович Бровин; born 25 March 1982) is a former Russian professional footballer.

== Club career ==
He made his debut in the Russian Premier League in 2003 for FC Rostov.

== Honours ==
- Russian Cup finalist: 2003.
