= Karen Sargsyan (footballer) =

Russian footballer (born 1983)

Personal information
- Full name: Karen Vovovich Sargsyan
- Date of birth: 27 April 1983 (age 43)
- Place of birth: Russia
- Height: 1.82 m (5 ft 11 1/2 in)
- Position: Forward

Senior career*
Years	Team	Apps	(Gls)
2001	FC Lokomotiv-Taym Mineralnye Vody	11	(1)
2001–2004	FC Dynamo Stavropol	42	(0)
2005	FC Dynamo Stavropol (amateur)		
2006–2007	FC Dynamo Stavropol	57	(32)
2008	FC Mashuk-KMV Pyatigorsk	36	(6)
2009	FC Chernomorets Novorossiysk	18	(1)
2009–2010	FC Torpedo Armavir	27	(6)
2010–2012	FC Volgar-Gazprom Astrakhan	11	(0)
2011–2012	→ FC Avangard Kursk (loan)	37	(17)
2012	FC Sokol Saratov	18	(5)
2013	FC Kaluga	13	(6)
- * Club domestic league appearances and goals

Karen Vovovich Sargsyan (Russian: Карен Вовович Саргсян; born 27 April 1983) is a Russian former professional footballer.

== Club career ==
He made his Russian Football National League debut for FC Mashuk-KMV Pyatigorsk on 27 March 2008 in a game against FC Kuban Krasnodar.

== Personal life ==
His younger brother Movses Sargsyan is also a footballer.

== Honours ==
- Russian Second Division Zone South top scorer: 2007 (22 goals).
