= Vladimir Nikolayevich Morozov (footballer) =

Russian footballer

Vladimir Morozov
Personal information
- Full name: Vladimir Nikolayevich Morozov
- Date of birth: 12 December 1977 (age 48)
- Height: 1.86 m (6 ft 1 in)
- Positions: Forward; midfielder

Senior career*
Years	Team	Apps	(Gls)
1999	FC Uralmash Yekaterinburg	17	(1)
2000–2001	FC Dynamo Perm	42	(13)
2001–2003	FC Neftekhimik Nizhnekamsk	43	(5)
2003–2004	FC Alnas Almetyevsk	53	(18)
2005–2013	FC Chelyabinsk	199	(58)
- * Club domestic league appearances and goals

Vladimir Nikolayevich Morozov (Russian: Владимир Николаевич Морозов; born 12 December 1977) is a former Russian professional football player.

== Club career ==
He played two seasons in the Russian Football National League for FC Neftekhimik Nizhnekamsk.
