= Ivan Goryunov =

Russian footballer

Personal information
- Full name: Ivan Andreyevich Goryunov
- Date of birth: 28 May 1988 (age 38)
- Height: 1.87 m (6 ft 2 in)
- Position: Forward

Youth career
- DYuSSh-2 Krasnoyarsk

Senior career*
Years	Team	Apps	(Gls)
2006–2010	FC Metallurg-Yenisey Krasnoyarsk	96	(10)
2011–2012	FC Dynamo Barnaul	47	(11)
2012–2013	FC Restavratsiya Krasnoyarsk		
2013–2014	FC Smena Komsomolsk-na-Amure	15	(1)
2014–2015	FC Restavratsiya Krasnoyarsk		
2016–2017	FC Rassvet-Restavratsiya Krasnoyarsk		
2018	FC Achinsk		
- * Club domestic league appearances and goals

Ivan Andreyevich Goryunov (Russian: Иван Андреевич Горюнов; born 28 May 1988) is a Russian former professional football player.

== Club career ==
He played in the Russian Football National League for FC Metallurg Krasnoyarsk in 2006.
