= Vladimir Serov (footballer) =

Russian footballer

Personal information
- Full name: Vladimir Nikolayevich Serov
- Date of birth: 9 September 1979 (age 47)
- Height: 1.89 m (6 ft 2 in)
- Position: Forward

Senior career*
Years	Team	Apps	(Gls)
1996–1997	FC Dynamo-d Stavropol	54	(9)
1998	FC Dynamo Stavropol	0	(0)
1998	FC Lokomotiv-Taym Mineralnye Vody	18	(4)
1999	FC Beshtau Lermontov	35	(10)
2001	FC Lada Togliatti	0	(0)
2001–2003	FC Druzhba Maykop	88	(28)
2004	FC Chernomorets Novorossiysk	12	(0)
2005	FC Druzhba Maykop	10	(8)
2005–2009	FC Rotor Volgograd	93	(38)
2010	FC Fakel Voronezh	12	(1)
2011–2012	FC Sokol Saratov	22	(4)
- * Club domestic league appearances and goals

Vladimir Nikolayevich Serov (Russian: Владимир Николаевич Серов; born 9 September 1979) is a former Russian professional football player.

== Club career ==
He played in the Russian Football National League for FC Chernomorets Novorossiysk in 2004.
