= Lyepyel district =

District of Vitebsk region, Belarus

Coordinates: 54°52′30″N 28°41′40″E

Lyepyel district Лепельскі раён (Belarusian) Лепельский район (Russian)
- District
- Flag Coat of arms

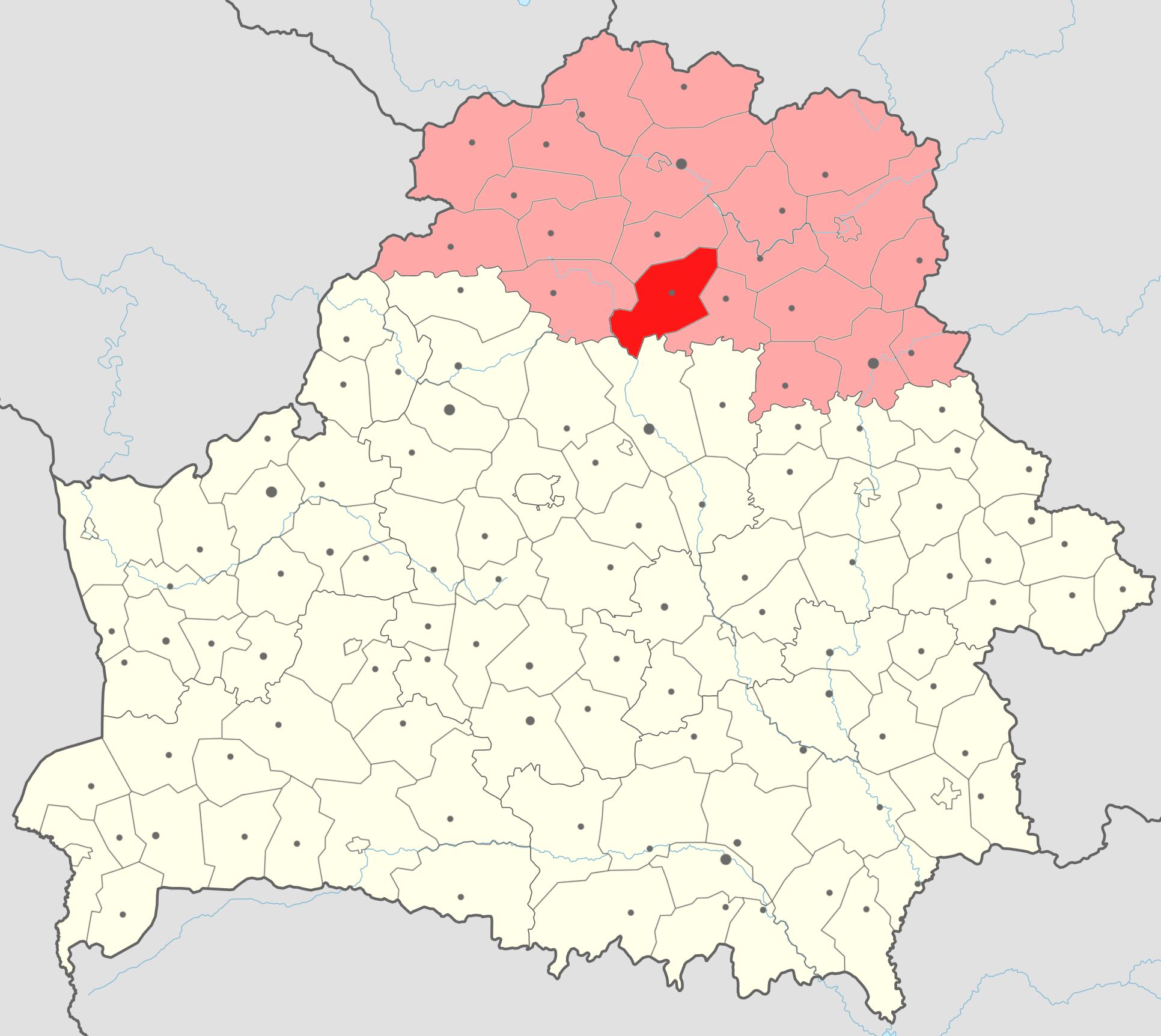
- Country: Belarus
- Region: Vitebsk region
- Administrative center: Lyepyel

Area
  - Total: 1,822.22 km^{2} (703.56 sq mi)

Population (2023)
  - Total: 30,737
  - Density: 16.868/km^{2} (43.688/sq mi)
- Time zone: UTC+3 (MSK)

Lyepyel district (Belarusian: Лепельскі раён; Russian: Лепельский район) is a district (raion) of Vitebsk region, Belarus. The administrative center is Lyepyel.

The 19th Guards Mechanized Brigade is located as of 2012 in Zaslonovo, a few kilometres west of Lyepyel.

Today this district is famous for its health resorts surrounded by lakes and forest. The largest lake among them is Lyepyelskoye. The Berezinsky Biosphere Reserve is located in the district, with Domzheritsy village serving as its administrative centre.

The Vula river flows through this district.

== Sources ==
- Stavrovsky, D. D.; Kovalev, A. A. (1996). Berezinsky Biosphere Reserve. Belarusian Encyclopaedia. p. 26. ISBN 9789851100626.
