= Yevgeni Ragoza =

Russian footballer and coach

Personal information
- Full name: Yevgeni Aleksandrovich Ragoza
- Date of birth: 11 January 1979 (age 47)
- Height: 1.87 m (6 ft 2 in)
- Positions: Forward; defender

Team information
- Current team: FC Strogino Moscow (assistant coach)

Senior career*
Years	Team	Apps	(Gls)
1996–1997	FC Angara Angarsk	47	(6)
1998–2000	FC Zvezda Irkutsk	58	(7)
2001	FC Sibiryak Bratsk	16	(5)
2001–2003	FC Chkalovets-1936 Novosibirsk	51	(27)
2003	FC Sokol Saratov	8	(1)
2004	FC Sodovik Sterlitamak	33	(21)
2005	FC Metallurg-Kuzbass Novokuznetsk	25	(5)
2005–2006	FC Sodovik Sterlitamak	46	(11)
2007	FC Dynamo Barnaul	29	(19)
2008	FC Volga Nizhny Novgorod	10	(4)
2009	FC Sibir-LFK Novosibirsk		
2010	FC KUZBASS Kemerovo	1	(0)
2010	FC Dynamo Biysk (amateur)		
2011	FC Irtysh Omsk	25	(3)

Managerial career
- 2019–: FC Strogino Moscow (assistant)
- * Club domestic league appearances and goals

Yevgeni Aleksandrovich Ragoza (Russian: Евгений Александрович Рагоза; born 11 January 1979) is a Russian professional football coach and a former player. He was the former assistant coach with FC Strogino Moscow, until January 2025.

== Club career ==
He played three seasons in the Russian Football National League for FC Sokol Saratov, FC Metallurg-Kuzbass Novokuznetsk and FC Sodovik Sterlitamak.

== Honours ==
- Russian Second Division top scorer: 2004 (Zone Ural/Povolzhye, 21 goals), 2007 (Zone East, 19 goals).
