= Yevgeni Polyakov =

Russian footballer and manager

Personal information
- Full name: Yevgeni Viktorovich Polyakov
- Date of birth: 29 September 1980 (age 46)
- Height: 1.75 m (5 ft 9 in)
- Position: Forward

Team information
- Current team: FC Oryol (academy coach)

Senior career*
Years	Team	Apps	(Gls)
1999–2003	FC Oryol	118	(19)
2003	FC Spartak Lukhovitsy	16	(1)
2004	FC Lada Togliatti	10	(1)
2004–2005	FC Avangard Kursk	33	(4)
2006	FK Atlantas	10	(1)
2006	FC Shakhter Karagandy	5	(0)
2007	FC Oryol (amateur)		
2008	FC Dynamo-Voronezh Voronezh	13	(1)
2008–2014	FC Oryol	121	(44)

Managerial career
- 2015–2016: FC Oryol (assistant)
- 2018–2022: FC Oryol (assistant)
- 2023–2025: FC Oryol
- 2025–: FC Oryol (academy)
- * Club domestic league appearances and goals

Yevgeni Viktorovich Polyakov (Russian: Евгений Викторович Поляков; born 29 September 1980) is a Russian professional football manager and a former player. He is coaching at the academy of FC Oryol.

== Club career ==
He played in the Russian Football National League for FC Avangard Kursk in 2005.

== Honours ==
- Russian Second Division Zone Centre top scorer: 2010 (20 goals).
