= FC Oryol =

Russian football club

- Full name: Football Club Oryol
- Founded: 1960
- Ground: Central Stadium, Oryol
- Capacity: 15,292
- Owner: Oryol Oblast
- Chairman: Nikita Fursin
- Manager: Pyotr Nemov
- League: Russian Second League, Division B, Group 3
- 2026: 10th
- Website: fc-orel.ru
Home colours	Away colours

FC Oryol (Russian: ФК «Орёл») is a Russian football club based in the city of Oryol. From 2004 to 2006 FC Oryol played in the Russian First Division.

== History ==
Football has been played in Oryol since 1911. In 1960 a team named Lokomotiv was formed in Oryol to play in the Class B of the Soviet championship. In 1963 it was renamed Spartak, in 1973 Stal (meaning "steel"), in 1975 the team was renamed Spartak again.

The team played in Class B until the restructuring of the leagues in 1971, when it entered the Soviet Second League. In 1990–1991 Spartak played in the Second League B.

In 1992 Spartak entered the Russian Second League. In 1993 the team was renamed Oryol. In 1994 Oryol moved to the Third League, and in 1996 they were promoted back after finishing third. In 2003 Oryol finished first in the Centre zone of the Second Division and were promoted to the First Division. The sixth position in 2004 was the best in the club's history. In 2006 Oryol were relegated from the First Division after finishing 20th. The club faced financial problems, thus abandoning their place in the Second Division, was re-created as Spartak Oryol and joined the Amateur Football League. After a year in the amateur league, FC Oryol returned to the Second Division and was once again renamed, entering 2008 season as FC Rusichi Oryol. Rusichi finished mid-table in their first three seasons in the Second Division, with Yevgeni Polyakov becoming the central zone's top scorer with 20 goals in 2010. In winter 2011 rumours circulated that the team would change its name to FC Oryol. Despite being in top five for the most part of 2011/12 season, Rusichi once again finished mid-table (8th place). In summer of 2012 the club announced the name change, finally becoming FC Oryol again. During the winter break of the 2016–17 season, the club experienced financial difficulties and did not finish out the season of the Russian Professional Football League.

On 16 February 2024, Oryol was licensed for the 2024 season of the Russian Second League. It was assigned to Group 3 of the Division B (fourth tier).

Oryol's top achievement in the Russian Cup is the 1/8 final in the 1996–97 competition.

== Current squad ==
As of 11 September 2026, according to the Second League website.

Note: Flags indicate national team as defined under FIFA eligibility rules; some limited exceptions apply. Players may hold more than one non-FIFA nationality.

No.	Pos.	Nation	Player
2	DF	RUS	Sergey Khmelevskoy
3	MF	RUS	Andrey Yakushin
5	MF	RUS	Yevgeni Ushakov
7	MF	RUS	Daniil Arsentyev
8	MF	RUS	Dmitry Merkulov
9	MF	RUS	Artyom Oshkin
10	MF	RUS	Emrakh Nabatov
14	DF	RUS	Vyacheslav Gordiyenko
15	DF	RUS	Dmitry Polyakov
17	FW	RUS	Maksim Fateyev
19	MF	RUS	Georgy Borisov
24	MF	RUS	Matvey Tsygankov
31	FW	RUS	Igor Bugayenko

No.	Pos.	Nation	Player
33	GK	RUS	Nikita Kotov
45	DF	RUS	Stepan Pyatin
55	DF	RUS	Dmitry Kopylov
57	GK	RUS	Vadim Averkiyev
61	FW	RUS	Arsen Dryayev
66	MF	RUS	David Bekoyev
70	DF	RUS	Arsen Agakhanov
75	GK	RUS	Pavel Zemskov
77	DF	RUS	Kirill Grezev
88	MF	RUS	Arkhip Leonov
97	DF	RUS	Danila Sokol
99	MF	RUS	Aleksey Kiselyov

=== Out on loan ===
Note: Flags indicate national team as defined under FIFA eligibility rules; some limited exceptions apply. Players may hold more than one non-FIFA nationality.

No.	Pos.	Nation	Player
—	MF	RUS	Pavel Izotov (at Zenit-2 St. Petersburg until 31 December 2026)
