= Anton Sidelnikov =

Russian footballer

Personal information
- Full name: Anton Sergeyevich Sidelnikov
- Date of birth: 17 April 1981 (age 45)
- Height: 1.77 m (5 ft 10 in)
- Position: Forward

Senior career*
Years	Team	Apps	(Gls)
1997–1998	FC Gornyak Raychikhinsk		
2000–2001	FC Kristall Blagoveshchensk		
2001–2006	FC Amur Blagoveshchensk	142	(16)
2007	FC Chita	27	(12)
2008	FC Zhetysu	13	(1)
2009	FC Amur Blagoveshchensk	2	(0)
- * Club domestic league appearances and goals

Anton Sergeyevich Sidelnikov (Russian: Антон Серге́евич Сидельников; born 17 April 1981) is a former Russian professional footballer.

== Club career ==
He played in the Russian Football National League for FC Amur Blagoveshchensk in 2005.
