= Aleksandr Golubev (footballer) =

Russian footballer

Personal information
- Full name: Aleksandr Valeryevich Golubev
- Date of birth: 27 February 1986 (age 40)
- Place of birth: Astrakhan, Russian SFSR
- Height: 1.85 m (6 ft 1 in)
- Position: Forward

Youth career
- FC Volgar Astrakhan

Senior career*
Years	Team	Apps	(Gls)
2003	Volgar-Gazprom Astrakhan	10	(0)
2004–2006	Sudostroitel Astrakhan	57	(8)
2007	Kavkaztransgaz-2005 Ryzdvyany	9	(0)
2007–2009	Volgar-Gazprom-2 Astrakhan	15	(3)
2010	Astrakhan	28	(13)
2011–2012	Metallurg-Kuzbass Novokuznetsk	42	(10)
2013	Astrakhan	6	(1)
2013–2014	Amur-2010 Blagoveshchensk	16	(2)
2014	Gandzasar Kapan	3	(0)
2015	Astrakhan	26	(6)
- * Club domestic league appearances and goals

Aleksandr Valeryevich Golubev (Russian: Александр Валерьевич Голубев; born 27 February 1986) is a former Russian professional football player.

== Club career ==
He played two seasons in the Russian Football National League for FC Volgar-Gazprom Astrakhan and FC Metallurg-Kuzbass Novokuznetsk.
