= Morozov (surname) =

Morozov (masculine) (Russian: Моро́зов) or Morozova (Моро́зова) (feminine) is a common Russian surname. The alternative spellings are Morosov, Morosoff, Morosow, Morozow, Morozoff, Marozau and Marozaŭ. The surname is derived from the Russian word moroz (frost). The following people share this surname:

- Alexander Morozov (disambiguation), disambiguation
- Aleksey Morozov (disambiguation), several people
- Anatoly Morozov (disambiguation), disambiguation
- Anna Morozova (1921–1944), partisan and Hero of the Soviet Union
- Artem Morozov (born 1980), Ukrainian rower
- Boris Morozov (1590–1661), Russian statesman and boyar
- Denis Morozov (born 1973), Russian businessman
- Elisei Morozov (1798–1868), Russian Old Believer entrepreneur of Imperial Russia
- Evgeny Morozov (born 1984), Belarusian-American researcher and writer
- Feodosia Morozova (1632–1675), proponent of the Old Believers
- Georgy Morozov (1923–1971), Soviet soldier
- Georgy Fedorovich Morozov (1867–1920), Russian forest ecologist
- Grigori Morozov (born 1994), Russian footballer
- Igor Morozov (disambiguation), several people
- Ilia Morozov (born 2008), Russian ice hockey player
- Ivan Morozov (disambiguation), several people
- Liza Morozova (born 1973), Russian artist, psychologist and columnist
- Margarita Morozova (1873–1958), Russian philanthropist and writer
- Mikhail Morozov (disambiguation), several people
- Nikolay Morozov (disambiguation), several people
- Oleg Morozov (disambiguation), several people
- Olga Morozova (born 1949), Russian tennis player
- Pavel Marozau (born 1978), Belarusian civil activist and politician
- Pavlik Morozov (1918–1932), young martyr of Soviet propaganda
- Rinat Morozov (born 1969), Ukrainian football manager
- Savva Morozov (1862–1905), Russian entrepreneur and philanthropist
- Sergey Morozov (disambiguation), several people
- Valentin Morozov (born 1975), Russian ice hockey player
- Valentina Galaktionovna Morozova (1910–1989), Soviet geologist and paleontologist
- Varvara Alekseevna Morozova (1848–1917), Russian industrialist and philanthropist
- Vadim Morozov (1954–2021), Russian politician and businessman
- Vic Morrow, born Victor Morozoff (1929–1982), American actor of Russian descent
- Viktor Morozov, (born 1950), Ukrainian singer-songwriter and translator
- Vladimir Morozov (disambiguation), several people
- Yevgeny Morozov (disambiguation), several people
- Yury Morozov (disambiguation), several people

== See also ==
- Morozovs
- Morozoff
- Morozov (disambiguation)
- Mróz, Mroz, Mros, Mross (Mroß)
- Moroz, Maroz
- Mráz, Mraz, Mras (Mraß)
