= Morozovsky =

Morozovsky (masculine), Morozovskaya (feminine), or Morozovskoye (neuter) may refer to:

- Morozovsky District, a district of Rostov Oblast, Russia
- Morozovskoye Urban Settlement, several municipal urban settlements in Russia
- Morozovsky (rural locality) (Morozovskaya, Morozovskoye), several rural localities in Russia

== See also ==
- Moroz (disambiguation)
- Morozov (disambiguation)
- Morozovsk
- Elena Mrozovskaya, Russian photographer
