= Morozovskoye Urban Settlement =

Morozovskoye Urban Settlement is the name of several municipal formations in Russia.

- Morozovskoye Urban Settlement, a municipal formation corresponding to Morozovskoye Settlement Municipal Formation, an administrative division of Vsevolozhsky District of Leningrad Oblast
- Morozovskoye Urban Settlement, an administrative division and a municipal formation which the town of Morozovsk in Morozovsky District of Rostov Oblast is incorporated as

== See also ==
- Morozovsky
