= Corresponding Members of the Russian Academy of Arts =

Corresponding Members of the Russian Academy of Arts are artists, architects, designers and art critics. Members of the Russian Academy of Arts include full members, corresponding members, honorary members, and foreign members. The Academy Assembly has the right to elect them. Membership is lifelong. There are 311 art workers, including 107 women.

== List of corresponding members of the Russian Academy of Arts ==
Full name	Year of birth	Division	Specialization
Abisalov Yuri	1957	Painting	Painting
Avvakumov Mikhail	1938	Graphics	Graphics
Yuri Avvakumov	1957	Architecture	Architecture
Akopov Valerii	1938	Design	Graphics
Aleksandrov Sergei	1956	Painting	Painting
Aleksandrova Nataliia	1952	Art studies	Art studies
Andreeva Liudmila	1937	Art studies	Art studies
Aradushkin Oleg	1951	Graphics	Graphics
Arzumanov Valerii	1950	South region	Painting
Aronov Vladimir	1941	Art studies	Art studies
Arutiunian Anna	1983	Art studies	Art studies
Arkhangelov Sergei	1950	Architecture	Architecture
Arkhipova Anastasiia	1955	Graphics	Graphics
Astapchenko IUrii	1961	Sculpture	Sculpture
Afanasev Vladislav	1937	Ural region, Siberia and Far East	Painting
Bagaeva Tatiana	1980	Art studies	Art studies
Bazhanov Leonid	1945	Art studies	Art studies
Bakshtein Iosif	1945	Art studies	Art studies
Basaev Oleg	1960	South region	Painting
Batakov Nikolai	1949	Graphics	Graphics
Bashenin Valerii	1943	Painting	Painting
Belkovskii Igor	1962	Painting	Painting
Benediktov Stanislav	1944	Art of decoration
Besednova Natalia	1964	Graphics	Graphics
Birshtein Anna	1947	Painting	Painting
Blokhin Valerii	1964	South region	Painting
Bobrova Svetlana	1960	Art studies	Art studies
Bogdan Veronika-Irina	1959	Art studies	Art studies
Bokov Andrei	1943	Architecture	Architecture
Bolotskikh Galina	1938	Art studies	Art studies
Borovskii Aleksandr	1952	Art studies	Art studies
Bocharov Nikolai	1939	Painting	Painting
Brainin Vladimir	1951	Painting	Painting
Bubela-Maslova Veronika	1980	Painting	Painting
Budennaia Nina	1939	Arts and Crafts	Arts and Crafts
Buinachev Vladimir	1938	Sculpture	Sculpture
Bukiia Vladimir	1941	Painting	Painting
Bulochnikov Viktor	1939	Architecture	Architecture
Burganov Igor	1973	Sculpture	Sculpture
Busev Mikhail	1951	Art studies	Art studies
Buskin Viktor	1945	Painting	Painting
Vasilev Artur	1953	Ural region, Siberia and Far East	Painting
Vertinskaia Aleksandra	1969	Painting	Painting
Verkholantsev Mikhail	1937	Graphics	Graphics
Vizel Galina	1941	Ural region, Siberia and Far East	Arts and Crafts
Vilkov Anatolii	1949	Art studies	Art studies
Vinogradov Aleksandr	1963	Painting	Painting
Voinov Konstantin	1960	Ural region, Siberia and Far East	Painting
Volkov Andrei	1948	Painting	Painting
Volova Liudmila	1941	Painting	Painting
Volodina Svetlana	1935	Art studies	Art studies
Volokitina Olga	1967	Graphics	Graphics
Volosenkov Feliks	1944	Painting	Painting
Voronov IUrii	1956	Graphics	Graphics
Voskresenskii Anton	1977	Architecture	Architecture
Viatkina Nataliia	1941	Sculpture	Sculpture
Gavin Sergei	1953	Arts and Crafts	Arts and Crafts
Gavrilova Elizaveta	1954	Painting	Painting
Galatenko Vladimir	1949	Painting	Painting
Galkin Valerii	1955	Design	Design
Gamzatova Patimat	1959	Art studies	Art studies
Garapach Konstantin	1967	Sculpture	Sculpture
Glebova Nataliia	1951	Painting	Painting
Glukhov Aleksandr	1975	Design	Design
Glukhov Maksim	1975	Design	Design
Golynets Galina	1943	Ural region, Siberia and Far East	Art studies
Gorskii-CHernyshev Nikolai	1964	Painting	Painting
Grekov Aleksandr	1954	Art studies	Art studies
Grekov Aleksei	1958	Sculpture	Sculpture
Grigorian IUrii	1946	Painting	Painting
Gulevskii Sergei	1954	Graphics	Graphics
Gusarova Svetlana	1964	Art studies	Art studies
Gushapsha Arsen	1963	South region	Sculpture
Davydov Nikolai	1951	Painting	Painting
Davydova Irina	1952	Art studies	Art studies
Degot Ekaterina	1958	Art studies	Art studies
Demirkhanov Areg	1932	Ural region, Siberia and Far East	Architecture
Demkina Svetlana	1951	South region	Arts and Crafts
Demianchuk Viktor	1952	Painting	Painting
Denisov Anatolii	1957	Graphics	Graphics
Denisov Sergei	1960	Design	Design
Dranishnikov Vasilii	1936	Graphics	Graphics
Drozhzhin Gennadii	1937	Arts and Crafts	Arts and Crafts
Drozdov Vitalii	1939	Ural region, Siberia and Far East	Painting
Dubov Andrei	1959	Painting	Painting
Dubosarskii Vladimir	1964	Painting	Painting
Diukov Andrei	1942	Painting	Painting
Evseeva Nina	1960	South region	Sculpture
Egorov Andrei	1984	Art studies	Art studies
Elanov Arkadii	1964	Painting	Painting
Elkova Valentina	1930	Art studies	Art studies
Erokhin Viktor	1955	Design	Design
Andrey Esionov	1963	Painting	Painting
Efimov Nikolai	1957	Art studies	Art studies
ZHivaev Aleksei	1956	Painting	Painting
ZHilinskaia Olga	1954	Painting	Painting
Zaitsev Egor	1960	Design	Design
Zakomornyi Oleg	1968	Sculpture	Sculpture
Zakharov Andrei	1967	Painting	Painting
Zeinalov Aidyn	1978	Sculpture	Sculpture
Zolotukhin Anatolii	1944	Ural region, Siberia and Far East	Arts and Crafts
Zubrilin Konstantin	1963	Painting	Painting
Zubritskii Viktor	1946	Arts and Crafts	Arts and Crafts
Ibragimov Fidail	1938	Arts and Crafts	Arts and Crafts
Ivankin Vadim	1961	Ural region, Siberia and Far East	Graphics
Ivashchenko Inna	1968	Painting	Painting
Ikonnikov-TSipulin Dmitrii	1952	Painting	Painting
Kazakova Liudmila	1938	Art studies	Art studies
Kazarin Aleksandr	1971	Volga region	Design
Kalenkova Tatiana	1937	Sculpture	Sculpture
Kalmanov Alan	1964	South region	Painting
Kaliuta IUrii	1957	Painting	Painting
Karaeva Liudmila	1953	Sculpture	Sculpture
Kargopolova Galina	1937	Art studies	Art studies
Kachelaeva Elena	1948	Painting	Painting
Kiselev Mikhail	1937	Art studies	Art studies
Kichigin Georgii	1951	Ural region, Siberia and Far East	Painting
Kolesnikov Vladimir	1954	Sculpture	Sculpture
Kolesnikov Ivan	1954	Design	Design
Kolupaeva Anna	1957	Art studies	Art studies
Komov Ilia	1965	Painting	Painting
Kondratenko Liudmila	1965	Art studies	Art studies
Konoplev Aleksandr	1943	Graphics	Graphics
Korbakova Svetlana	1954	Art studies	Art studies
Korzina Galina	1944	Arts and Crafts	Arts and Crafts
Korneev Ivan	1952	Sculpture	Sculpture
Kornilova Ekaterina	1957	Painting	Painting
Kornoukhov Aleksandr	1947	Painting	Painting
Korobeinikov Vitalii	1950	South region	Painting
Korotaeva Aleksandra	1964	Graphics	Graphics
Korotkov Nikolai	1956	Graphics	Graphics
Koshelev Vladimir	1939	Sculpture	Sculpture
Kravchenko Aleksei	1966	Graphics	Graphics
Krasilnikova Mariia	1956	Painting	Painting
Kudrinskii Valerii	1947	Ural region, Siberia and Far East	Painting
Kudriavtseva Vitalina	1965	Design	Design
Sergey Kuznetsov	1977	Architecture	Architecture
Kuznetsov Feliks	1940	Arts and Crafts	Arts and Crafts
Kuznetsova Valentina	1949	Arts and Crafts	Arts and Crafts
Kuzmina Ekaterina	1983	Art studies	Art studies
Kuzminykh Konstantin	1960	Ural region, Siberia and Far East	Painting
Kurochkina Tatiana	1927	Art studies	Art studies
Kuteinikova Nina	1940	Art studies	Art studies
Lavrenov Lev	1932	Architecture	Architecture
Lavrov Aleksandr	1955	Painting	Painting
Lazarev Mikhail	1938	Art studies	Art studies
Lebedeva Raisa	1940	Painting	Painting
Leonov Mikhail	1949	Architecture	Architecture
Leonov Oleg	1959	Painting	Painting
Litovchenko Elena	1944	Arts and Crafts	Arts and Crafts
Lomakina Tatiana	1955	Sculpture	Sculpture
Lomova Nataliia	1963	Art studies	Art studies
Lotova Irina	1958	Painting	Painting
Loshakov Oleg	1936	Painting	Painting
Marina Kabysh	1969	Painting	Painting
Magomedov Kurbanali	1953	South region	Arts and Crafts
Maiorov Aleksandr	1958	Painting	Painting
Makaveeva Galina	1936	Graphics	Graphics
Makarov Nikita	1980	Painting	Painting
Mantserev Sergei	1957	Painting	Painting
Marts Irina	1959	Painting	Painting
Marts Liudmila	1935	Art studies	Art studies
Maslakova Svetlana	1942	Art studies	Art studies
Mashkov Igor	1967	Painting	Painting
Lev Matyushin	1932	Sculpture	Sculpture
Merzlikina IUliia	1970	Arts and Crafts	Arts and Crafts
Milchenko Sergei	1962	Sculpture	Sculpture
Mindlin Mikhail	1956	Art studies	Art studies
Minina Valeriia	1936	Art studies	Art studies
Minkin Viktor	1947	Painting	Painting
Miroshnichenko Sergei	1954	Art studies	Art studies
Mikhailova Tatiana	1946	Art studies	Art studies
Mikhailovskii Semen	1961	Art studies	Art studies
Mikhalkova Tatiana	1947	Design	Design
Mokrousov Vladimir	1936	Sculpture	Sculpture
Molchanov Oleg	1966	Painting	Painting
Morosov Aleksei	1974	Sculpture	Sculpture
Muravev Aleksandr	1948	Ural region, Siberia and Far East	Graphics
Muradova Izabella	1935	Design	Design
Muradova Natalia	1946	Arts and Crafts	Arts and Crafts
Muradian Razmik	1938	Sculpture	Sculpture
Musaev Abdulzagir	1951	South region	Painting
Mukhina Elena	1954	Painting	Painting
Miasnikov Georgii	1954	South region	Sculpture
Nazarov IUrii	1948	Design	Design
Nazarova Karine	1949	Painting	Painting
Dashi Namdakov	1967	Sculpture	Sculpture
Namerovskii Gennadii	1942	Graphics	Graphics
Nasonova Elena	1965	Art studies	Art studies
Naumova Larisa	1945	Painting	Painting
Nekliudov Vladimir	1938	Painting	Painting
Nepomniashchii Boris	1945	Graphics	Graphics
Nechaeva Tatiana	1948	Art studies	Art studies
Nechitailo Kseniia	1942	Painting	Painting
Nikolaev Vasilii	1951	Painting	Painting
Nikolaeva Natalia	1930	Art studies	Art studies
Novikov Igor	1961	Painting	Painting
Novikov Igor	1951	Sculpture	Sculpture
Novoselov Aleksei	1983	Art studies	Art studies
Obolenskii Andrei	1957	Architecture	Architecture
Ogurtsov Nikita	1962	Design	Design
Olevskaia Inna	1940	Arts and Crafts	Arts and Crafts
Ombysh-Kuznetsov Mikhail	1947	Ural region, Siberia and Far East	Painting
Orlov Aleksandr	1952	Art of decoration
Orlov Boris	1941	Sculpture	Sculpture
Orlov Sergei	1967	Art studies	Art studies
Osin Oleg	1939	Painting	Painting
Ochirova Aleksandra	1949	Art studies	Art studies
Papikian Karen	1960	Painting	Painting
Paskhina Elena	1949	Sculpture	Sculpture
Patsiukov Vitalii	1939	Art studies	Art studies
Perventseva Ekaterina	1978	Art studies	Art studies
Pereiaslavets Mariia	1964	Painting	Painting
Petrova Evgeniia	1946	Art studies	Art studies
Pimenov Vladimir	1941	Painting	Painting
Pobedova Olga	1950	Arts and Crafts	Arts and Crafts
Povaev Aleksandr	1948	South region	Painting
Poletaev Mikhail	1959	Painting	Painting
Polienko Ivan	1950	Painting	Painting
Polishchuk Leonid	1925	Painting	Painting
Poliakova Liudmila	1940	Art studies	Art studies
Ponomarev Aleksandr	1963	Design	Design
Popov Aleksei	1960	Graphics	Graphics
Prokatov IUrii	1945	South region	Design
Psarev Viktor	1950	Design	Painting
Putintsev Eduard	1930	Architecture	Architecture
Pchelnikov Igor	1931	Painting	Painting
Raishev Gennadii	1933	Ural region, Siberia and Far East	Painting
Rapoport Evgenii	1934	Architecture	Architecture
Rozhnikov Aleksandr	1960	Sculpture	Sculpture
Romanova Elena	1962	Art studies	Art studies
Rotko Nikolai	1944	Ural region, Siberia and Far East	Painting
Rukavishnikov Filipp	1974	Sculpture	Sculpture
Rybkin Anatolii	1949	Painting	Painting
Ryzhova Tatiana	1947	Painting	Painting
Riumin Aleksandr	1944	Design	Design
Savelev IUrii	1959	Architecture	Architecture
Savkuev KHamid	1964	Graphics	Graphics
Sazhin Timur	1943	Arts and Crafts	Arts and Crafts
Safarova Adelia	1939	Art studies	Art studies
Semenov Sergei	1956	Graphics	Graphics
Sergeev IUrii	1961	Painting	Painting
Sergin Valerian	1936	Ural region, Siberia and Far East	Painting
Seslavinskii Mikhail	1964	Art studies	Art studies
Slepushkin Dmitrii	1967	Painting	Painting
Smolenkov Anatolii	1954	Sculpture	Sculpture
Sokolova Anastasiia	1967	Painting	Painting
Stekolshchikov Anton	1967	Painting	Painting
Strakhov Valerii	1950	Painting	Painting
Sukhovetskii Aleksei	1953	Painting	Painting
Tarasenko Aleksandr	1947	Sculpture	Sculpture
Tarasov Valerii	1942	Design	Design
Taratukhin Stanislav	1954	Volga region	Painting
Taratynov Aleksandr	1956	Sculpture	Sculpture
Teplov Valentin	1952	Ural region, Siberia and Far East	Graphics
Tereshchenko Nikolai	1953	Painting	Painting
Tikhonov Aleksei	1952	Architecture	Architecture
Tkacheva Elena	1959	Painting	Painting
Tkachenko Larisa	1950	Arts and Crafts	Arts and Crafts
Tkachenko Sergei	1953	Architecture	Architecture
Tokarev Aleksandr	1946	Painting	Painting
Tokareva Irina	1974	Painting	Painting
Tomson Olga	1957	Art studies	Art studies
Trofimova Irina	1937	Arts and Crafts	Arts and Crafts
Trushnikova Olga	1963	Painting	Painting
Turaev Pavel	1955	Sculpture	Sculpture
Umarsultanov Vakhidt	1950	South region	Painting
Ustinov IUrii	1954	Art of decoration
Ushaev Grigorii	1922	Design	Design
Ushakova Larisa	1960	South region	Painting
Faidysh Tatiana	1955	Painting	Painting
Fedorova Mariia	1952	Art of decoration
Fedotova Elena	1947	Art studies	Art studies
Finogenova Mlada	1941	Painting	Painting
Florkovskaia Anna	1965	Art studies	Art studies
Fokin Aleksandr	1958	Arts and Crafts	Arts and Crafts
Fomicheva Daria	1968	Graphics	Graphics
Khabarova Margarita	1941	Art studies	Art studies
Khalafian Akop	1953	South region	Sculpture
Khalikov Farinat	1957	Volga region	Painting
Kharlov Viktor	1949	Volga region	Painting
Kharchenko Oleg	1948	Architecture	Architecture
Khasianova Leila	1963	Painting	Painting
Kholmogorova Mariia	1973	Ural region, Siberia and Far East	Painting
Khudiakova Aleksandra	1970	Design	Design
Tsikulina Nadezhda	1950	Painting	Painting
Tsrimov Ruslan	1952	South region	Painting
Chernoritskii Valerii	1961	Painting	Painting
Chernysheva Ekaterina	1935	Painting	Painting
Chuvin Aleksandr	1952	Painting	Painting
Chkhaidze Omar	1944	Painting	Painting
Shankov Mikhail	1962	Painting	Painting
ShapoShnikova Valeriia	1940	Painting	Painting
Sharov Sergei	1945	Architecture	Architecture
Shakhmardanov Sharif	1947	Painting	Painting
Shakhovskaia Mariia	1928	Arts and Crafts	Arts and Crafts
Shevchenko Pavel	1954	Sculpture	Sculpture
Shengeliia Aleksandr	1948	Sculpture	Sculpture
Shenkhorov CHingiz	1948	Ural region, Siberia and Far East	Painting
Shepeleva Nataliia	1946	Art studies	Art studies
Shilov Aleksandr	1974	Painting	Painting
ShirShova Liubov	1952	Art studies	Art studies
Shikhireva Tatiana	1949	Arts and Crafts	Arts and Crafts
ShiShin Mikhail	1956	Ural region, Siberia and Far East	Art studies
Shmarin Dmitrii	1967	Painting	Painting
Shtein Vladimir	1967	Painting	Painting
Shtykhno Oleg	1961	Painting	Painting
Shchanitsyna Ekaterina	1947	Arts and Crafts	Arts and Crafts
Shchankin Ivan	1963	Volga region	Design
Shcherbakov Andrei	1965	Volga region	Sculpture
Iusupova Ainura	1959	Art studies	Art studies
Iakhont Oleg	1941	Art studies	Art studies
