= Alexander Moroz (disambiguation) =

Alexander Moroz (1961–2009) was a Ukrainian chess grandmaster.

Alexander Moroz or Oleksandr Moroz (Ukrainian Олександр Мороз; Russian Александр Мороз) may also refer to:

- Oleksandr Moroz (born 1944), Ukrainian statesman and politician
- Oleksandr Moroz (born 1952), Ukrainian footballer and later coach with FC Dynamo Kyiv
- Alexander Moroz, Belarusian captain of 2016 rescue vessel Aquarius (NGO ship)
- Oleksandr Moroz, Ukrainian silver medalist in Swimming at the 2015 European Youth Summer Olympic Festival

== See also ==
- Moroz (surname)
