= Goreski =

Goreski (Macedonian: Горески) is a Macedonian surname. Notable people with the surname include:

- Brad Goreski (born 1977), Canadian fashion stylist and television personality
- Vlado Goreski (born 1958), Macedonian and Slovenian graphic artist, artist, and scenographer
