= ARU TV =

Russian-language web television channel and website based in Estonia

ARU.TV
- Website type: Web television
- Available in: Russian
- Headquarters: Tallinn, Estonia
- Owner: ARU Television OÜ
- Website: www.aru.tv
- Launched: January 28, 2015; 11 years ago
- Current status: Active

ARU.TV is a news and opinions web TV channel based in Tallinn, Estonia, and was launched in 2015. The project is aimed to combat Kremlin propaganda and targets people in Russia and the Russian-speaking population of Belarus, Ukraine and the Baltic States.

== Content ==
At the moment, ARU TV offers several regular shows:

- Multi-Colored News is an original show by Russian journalist Artemy Troitsky devoted to analyzing key events of the week.
- The Expert show offers comments and forecasts of prominent analysts regarding important subjects.
- Time to Lie is an animated sketch story that parodies the propaganda style of government-owned media.
- Trash Parade is a quarterly satirical ranking of the most absurd events in the post-Soviet region.

== The team ==
According to DELFI news website, ARU TV employs experts in the field of media and communications from Russia and other post-Soviet countries. The project is led by Belarusian internet producer Pavel Marozau who was granted political asylum in Estonia after Belarusian authorities had tried to bring charges against him in the Multclub case. Famous Russian journalist Artemy Troitsky has been working with ARU TV from the very beginning. He hosts there an original show called Multi-Colored News.

ARU TV's headquarters are in Tallinn, Estonia. According to Pavel Marozau, «since we are based in Estonia, our project can freely bring the audience an alternative point of view on key events. That’s different from Russia and Belarus, where independent media are being put under pressure more and more often».

== Broadcasting ==
Currently ARU TV's productions are published on its official website, YouTube channel and in social networks. Part of the content produced by the channel is rebroadcast by its partners: Echo of Moscow (Russia), Novaya Gazeta (Russia), Espreso TV cable channel (Ukraine), Delfi (Lithuania) and BDG (Belarus).

According to The Washington Post, at its peak in late 2016 ARU TV was reaching around 4 million viewers a month. As of April 2019, the channel has more than 150,000 subscribers on YouTube.
