= Yuri Avvakumov =

Russian painter

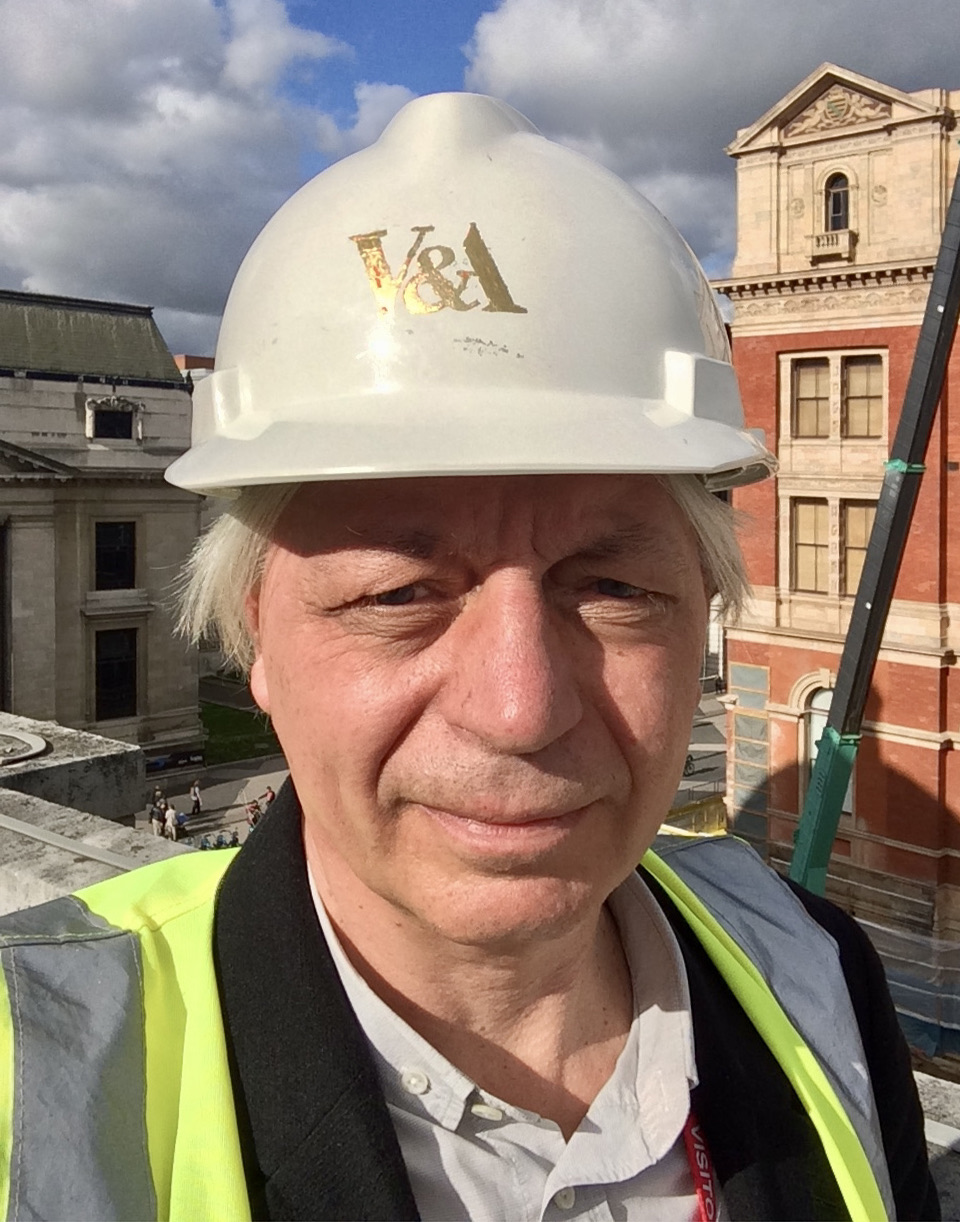
- Born: July 22, 1957 (age 69); Tiraspol, Moldavian SSR, Soviet Union (now Transnistria, Moldova)
- Occupation: Architect
- Website: avvakumov.com

Yuri Avvakumov (Russian: Ю́рий И́горевич Авваку́мов, born 22 July 1957, Tiraspol) is a Russian architect, artist, and curator. He became a member of the Union of Architects of Russia in 1985, a Corresponding Member of the Russian Academy of Arts in 2012, and a Full Member in 2017. Avvakumov has represented Russia at the Venice Biennale three times.

== Biography ==
He was born in Tiraspol in the Moldavian SSR of the Soviet Union (now in Transnistria, Moldova) on 22 July 1957 and has lived in Moscow since 1968. He graduated from the Moscow Architectural Institute (МАРХИ) in 1981 and worked there as a research fellow from 1983 to 1988.

Since 1982, he has participated in exhibitions of fine art and architecture as an artist, architect, and curator.

In 1988, he founded the Agitarch studio in Moscow.

In 1993, he established the Utopia Foundation.

From 1993 to 1994, he taught at the Karlsruhe University of Arts and Design (Die Hochschule für Gestaltung Karlsruhe) in Karlsruhe, Germany.

According to Snob magazine, by the early 2020s, Avvakumov had designed around 100 exhibitions as an architect, participated in approximately 500 as an artist, and curated about 50. He represented Russia at the Venice Biennale three times: in 1996 ("Presence of the Future. The Architect as a Seismograph"), 2003 ("Utopia Station"), and 2008 ("BornHouse").

He is married to the artist Alyona Kirtsova.

== Paper architecture ==
In 1984, Avvakumov introduced the term "paper architecture" into Russian usage to describe the genre of conceptual design that emerged in the USSR during the 1980s. According to Snob magazine, which refers to Avvakumov as "one of the most renowned contemporary Russian architects," paper architecture is defined as "avant-garde creative projects not intended for realization." The magazine notes that during Soviet times, Avvakumov succeeded in elevating this form of architecture, which began as a student rebellion against the architectural stagnation of the 1980s, to the status of a classic. Today, projects from that era are housed in the world's leading museums.

Since 1984, Avvakumov has organized exhibitions of Paper Architecture, which have taken place in cities such as Moscow, Ljubljana, Paris, Milan, Frankfurt, Antwerp, Cologne, Brussels, Zurich, Cambridge, Austin, New Orleans, Amherst, Volgograd, Venice, and Berlin. Collections of Paper Architecture are held in institutions including the Pushkin State Museum of Fine Arts in Moscow (30 works), the State Russian Museum in St. Petersburg (100 works), the State Tretyakov Gallery in Moscow (50 works), the Centre Pompidou in Paris (50 works), and the Museum of Modern Art (MoMA) in New York (50 works).

In 2019, Avvakumov published the book Paper Architecture. An Anthology through the Garage Museum Publishing House. The book presents an archive of selected works by Avvakumov in this genre, which he has been collecting since 1984. It features works by more than 100 authors, referred to as "paper artists," with 250 projects and 570 illustrations. In 2020, Avvakumov received The Art Newspaper Russia award for "Book of the Year" for this publication. The book was reissued in English in 2021, and in 2023, the second edition was published in Russian.

== Examples of works and projects ==
Since the early 1980s, Avvakumov has been engaging with the legacy of the Russian avant-garde. He has designed exhibitions for Lyubov Popova (1989), Konstantin Melnikov (1990), Olga Rozanova (1991), and Vladimir Tatlin (1993/1994). He also worked on the website of Ivan Leonidov and, in 2002, reconstructed Kazimir Malevich's architecton.

In 1986, Avvakumov began a series of works titled Temporary Monuments, dedicated to the constructivism of the 1920s and its heroes. Exhibitions of the entire series were held at the Linsen Gallery in Cologne (1990), the Russian Museum in St. Petersburg, and the Museum of Architecture in Moscow (1992–93). The main work from this series, Worker and Kolkhoz Woman International (1991), was also shown at the 6th International Architecture Exhibition in Venice (1996), the Tretyakov Gallery in Moscow (2000), the Berlin-Moscow exhibition in Berlin, and the Work and Live. Constructivist Architecture. 1917–1937 exhibition at the Zotov Center in 2023. Other works from this series were exhibited in various cities around the world throughout the 1990s and 2000s.

From 2000 to 2003, Avvakumov curated 36 exhibitions of architectural photography for the Photoprogram 24 at the State Museum of Architecture in Moscow and the Moscow House of Photography.

In 2007, Avvakumov organized the exhibition BornHouse at the VKHUTEMAS Gallery in Moscow as part of the Second Biennale of Contemporary Art. In 2008, he held the exhibition at the Church of San Stae in Venice as part of the 11th Biennale of Architecture. In 2009, the exhibition was showcased at the Church of St. Mary Magdalene in Lille during the Europe XXL festival.

In June 2008, Avvakumov served as the curator of the exhibition dedicated to the opening of the Garage Museum.

He participated in the design of the recreational complex "New Holland" in St. Petersburg, the "Museum Town" at the Pushkin Museum in Moscow, Saadiyat Island in Abu Dhabi, the underground museum "Zaryadye" in Moscow (2016), and other projects.

In 2014, he designed the exhibition Right of Correspondence, which featured notes and letters from political prisoners in Soviet camps, drawn from the archives of the society Memorial.

In 2025, the Garage Museum publishing house released the book "EXAMPLES. The Exhibiting Art, or the Art of Exhibiting", which included more than 100 museum and exhibition projects by Avvakumov from 1983 to 2025. The projects are accompanied by explanatory notes and comments. The album of projects is preceded by 33 short essays summarizing the author's experience in designing exhibitions and museums.

== Awards and recognition ==
In 1997, he received the British Council Award for the Krasnaya Gorka Bridge project (which was not implemented).

In 2001, he was awarded the Gold Honorary Badge of "Public Recognition."

In 2007, he received the Ludwig Giese Prize at the 10th Sculpture Triennial in Fellbach, Germany.

In 2010, he was awarded the Innovation State Prize for the Open Doors Day project at the MMOMA.

In 2017 and 2022, he received the silver and gold medals "Worthy" from the Russian Academy of Arts.

== Works, collections and projects ==
=== Museums ===
Avvakumov's works are represented in the following museum collections of the world:

- Russian Museum (Saint Petersburg);
- Tretyakov Gallery (Moscow);
- National Centre for Contemporary Arts (Moscow);
- Shchusev Museum of Architecture (Moscow);
- Moscow Museum of Modern Art (Moscow);
- Stella Art Foundation (Moscow);
- Museum of Modern Art (New York);
- German Architecture Museum (Frankfurt);
- Victoria and Albert Museum (London);
- Centre Pompidou (Paris);
- ZKM Center for Art and Media Karlsruhe (Karlsruhe);
- Alberto Sandretti Collection (Milan);
- Stadtmuseum Fellbach (Fellbach);
- Nasher Museum of Art (Durham, North Carolina).

== Links ==
- Official English website
