= Alyona Kirtsova =

Russian painter

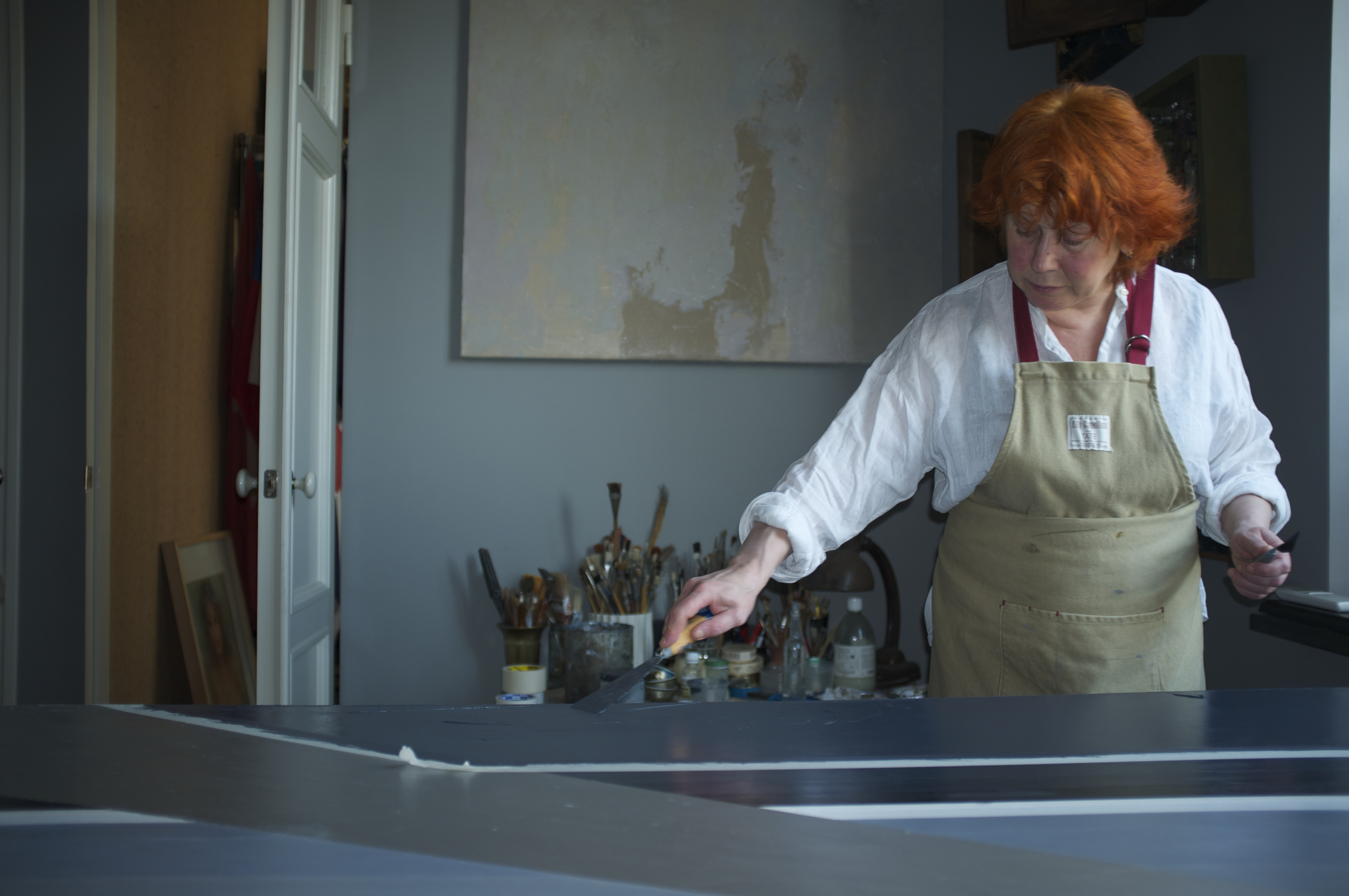
- Born: January 24, 1954 (age 72); Barentsburg, Spitsbergen
- Occupation: painter
- Website: kirtsova.com

Alyona Valentinovna Kirtsova (Russian: Алёна Кирцова; born 24 January 1954) is a Russian painter.

== Biography ==
Alyona Kirtsova was born on January 24, 1954, in the settlement of Barentsburg on the archipelago of Spitsbergen to an international journalist and a diplomat.

From 1972 to 1975 she studied at the private school of the artist Vasily Sitnikov in Moscow. Since 1977 she has been participating in painting exhibitions.

In 1979, she became the owner of a "certificate of ownership of Andy Warhol's soul", having bought it at an art auction (Warhol "sold his soul" as a performance).

In 1986, she was a co-founding member of the creative association "Hermitage".

In 1993 she became a co-founder of the Utopia Foundation.

In 2009, she was awarded a first-degree diploma for the best art project at the 8th Krasnoyarsk Museum Biennale "Dal".

In 2024 she was awarded the silver medal of the Russian Academy of Arts.

== Public collections ==
- Russian Museum (St. Petersburg)
- Tretyakov Gallery (Moscow)
- National Centre for Contemporary Arts (Moscow)
- State Museum and Exhibition Center "ROSIZO" (Moscow)
- Stella Art Foundation (Moscow)
- Novosibirsk State Art Museum (Novosibirsk)
- Krasnoyarsk Museum Center (Krasnoyarsk)
- Solomon R. Guggenheim Museum (New York, USA)
- Corcoran Gallery of Art (Washington, USA)
- Zimmerli Art Museum at Rutgers University (New Brunswick, USA)
- Museum of Modern Art in Avignon (France)
- Alberto Sandretti Foundation (Milan, Italy)
- Gazprombank's collection (Moscow)
- Deutsche Bank'collection (Moscow)
- Leonid Talochkin's collection (Moscow)
- Mikhail Alshibaya's collection (Moscow)

== Personal exhibitions ==
- 1990 — "Alyona Kirtsova", Moscow State University
- 1991 — "Alyona Kirtsova", First Gallery, Moscow
- 1991 — "Walls and Stairs" (together with Yuri Avvakumov), State Museum of Architecture, Moscow
- 1994 — “Alyona Kirtsova”, State Russian Museum, St. Petersburg (catalogue)
- 1996 — Frankfurt Aufenthalte (together with Gia Rigvava), Carmelite Gallery, Frankfurt am Main, Germany (catalogue)
- 1996 — "Red Wine — Green Grass". Gallery "Roses of Azora", Moscow
- 2002 — "Retrospective", Moscow Arts Center
- 2006–2007 — "Color Handbook". Stella Art Foundation, Moscow
- 2010 — "The North", Stella Art Foundation, Moscow
- 2010 — "Matter", Moscow Museum of Modern Art
- 2014 — "Gray Scale", Stella Art Foundation, Moscow
- 2016 — "HxWxD"("Height x Width x Depth"), Totibadze Gallery, Moscow
- 2022 — "Watershed", E.K. ArtBuro, Moscow
- 2024 — "Pigment. Paint. Color.", Systema Gallery, Moscow

== Reviews ==
The Art Newspaper characterizes the artist's work as "distinguished by a subtle duality: in her laconic abstractions one can discern views of a night city, fragments of an interior, and a landscape".

Michael Govan, Director of the Los Angeles County Museum of Art: "Abstract luminescent effect of Kirtsova's oil paintings, sculptures of prismatically arranged chards of old glass, and meticulously rendered drawings is important not only for the pure visual pleasure it inspires, bui also, in metaphorical terms, for the fleeting sense of life it allows. Like the instantaneous flash of a photograph which distrupts all time before and after it by the grip it holds on the moment, grip it holds on the moment, Kirtsova's art imparts to the viewer in its experience the same transitory coherence of cognition, of thinking, that unexpectedly and momentarily transforms our perception of simple paint into ART, or the organic continuity of experience into LIFE".

Hans-Peter Riese, journalist, art historian and curator: "Not a single one of her paintings shows even a hint of trying for effect. Rather, they give the appearance - one almost wants to say: like the old masters – of beying solidly crafted works. But this is only the technical aspect of the contemporary consciousness that is reflected in these pictures. What goes even further and constitutes what is truly new in these artworks is the nearly spontaneous inclusion of existence in all its complexity. Through art, the contradictions exemplifying this existence become a process of harmonisation. The necessary effort, made visible in the artist’s work and injected into it, creates the work’s depth, which in this context represents a transformation of complexity".

== Links ==
- Official website
