= Aleksey Morozov =

Aleksey Morozov may refer to:

- Alexey Morozov (born 1961), Soviet/Russian theoretical physicist
- Aleksey Morozov (footballer) (born 1966), Russian football coach and player
- Alexey Morosov (born 1974), Russian-Italian contemporary artist
- Alexei Morozov (born 1977), Russian ice hockey player
- Aleksey Morozov (actor) (born 1979), Russian theatre actor and film director
- Alexei Morozov, a character in the TV series The Americans
