= Andrey Esionov =

Russian painter and graphic artist

- Born: 1963 (age 61–62); Tashkent, Uzbek SSR, Soviet Union
- Website: http://esionov.ru/

Andrey Kimovich Esionov (Russian: Андрей Кимович Есионов; born 1963) is a Russian painter and graphic artist, who paints portraits and cityscapes. He is academician (Full member) of the Russian Academy of Arts (the painting department, 2018), Honorary Academician of the Florentine Academy of Fine Arts and Drawing (Accademia delle Arti del Disegno), a member of the Russian Artistic Union of Painters (1995), the Moscow Artists' Association of International Art Fund, and the Union of Russian Artists.

Esionov works in the portrait genre, and actively promotes watercolor painting. According to critics he works in a contemporary art style at the interface of academism. The artist's works are in the collections of museums including the Moscow Museum of Modern Art (Moscow), the State Russian Museum (Saint Petersburg), the State Museum of Fine Arts of the Republic of Tatarstan (Kazan), Samara Regional Art Museum (Samara), the State Museum of Arts of Uzbekistan (Tashkent)., the Museum of the Academy of Fine Arts and Drawing ( Accademia delle Arti del Disegno) (Florence), Vatican Museums, San Salvatore in Lauro Museum (Rome), Pantheon/Santa Maria ad Martires Basilica Museum (Rome) and other important museums and galleries. In his paintings the artist turns objects and subjects of the real world into works of art which is an indisputable evidence of his talent, high level of professional skills and mastery. Rather than cloning the real world, Esionov uses no optical devices, film or photo cameras to create a new reality relying only on purely artistic means. Esionov’s imaginary compositions and creative stylistic peculiarities visualize harmony of reality and imagination that inspires associative perception and imagination.

- Alexander Rozhin, academician of the Russian Academy of arts, Editor-in-Chief, The Tretyakov Gallery Magazine.

== Biography ==
Andrey Kimovich Esionov was born in the city of Tashkent, USSR. He graduated from the Republican Music and Art boarding school in 1981 as a specialist in graphic art. In the same year he entered the Tashkent State Theater and Art Institute named after Alexander Ostrovsky, where received an academic education in the Department of Easel Painting. Esionov is a member of the Creative Union of Artists of Russia and of the Union of Artists of Russia. He is academician of the Russian Academy of Arts. He has been awarded a gold medal by the Russian Academy of Arts (2012), Shuvalov's medal (2016), T.T. Salakhov Medal (2023), Medal of the Order for Services to the Fatherland, II degree (March 28, 2019) - for a great contribution to the development of national culture and art, the media, many years of fruitful activity (Russia) and has been honoured with many international and national exhibitions.

== Personal exhibitions ==
- Personal exhibition - Moscow and Muscovites in the halls of the Russian Academy of Arts. Moscow, Prechistenka, 21 (2013)
- Personal exhibition - Moscou et moscovites in the Artspace Galleries-Art Galleries Europe, 78 avenue de Suffren, Paris (2013)
- Personal exhibition in the framework of the Russian year of culture, Ministry of Regional Development in the gallery of the Ministry. Moscow, Red Presnya Street, 3 (2014)
- Solo exhibition - From A to Z in the halls of the Gallery of Ats Zurab Tsereteli. Moscow, Prechistenka, 19 (2014)
- Personal exhibition Reflections in the Colored Water in the Moscow Museum of Modern Art (MMOMA). Moscow, Gogol Boulevard, 10 (2016)
- Personal exhibition - Reflection at the State Russian Museum, the Stroganov Palace. Saint Petersburg, Nevsky prospect, 17 (2016)
- Solo exhibition - Art Transformations in the Samara art Museum. Samara, street of Kuibyshev, 92 (June 2017 – July 2017)
- Solo exhibition - Equilibrium in the State Museum of fine arts of the Republic of Tatarstan. Kazan, Kazan Kremlin, Museum complex Khazine (August 2017 – September 2017)
- Personal exhibition - To Step in the River Twice at the State Museum of Arts of Uzbekistan. Tashkent, Amir Temur Avenue, 16 (October 2017 – December 2017)
- Personal exhibition - Neonomads and Autochtones at the Accademia delle Arti del Disegno di Firenze in the gallery of the Academy, Florence, Ricasoli 68 (March 2019 - April 2019)
- Personal exhibition - Visionary realism at the Museum San Salvatore in Lauro, Rome, Piazza San Salvatore in Lauro, 15 (September 2019 - 25 January 2020)
- Personal exhibition - Preliminary results in the Gallery of Contemporary Art of the State Museum of Fine Arts of the Republic of Tatarstan. Kazan, Karl Marx 57 (August 2021 - November 2021)
- Personal exhibition - Armed with vision at the State Museum of Architecture. Shchuseva, wing "Ruin". Moscow, Vozdvizhenka 5/25 (December 2021- February 2022).
- Personal exhibition - The Way of Faith: The Art of Andrey Esionov in Seven Churches of Rome. For the first time, paintings are presented simultaneously in seven historical churches in Rome: Pantheon - Santa Maria ad Martyres, San Marco Evangelista al Campidoglio, Gesù, Santi Vincenzo e Anastasio a Trevi, Sant’Andrea della Valle, San Lorenzo in Lucina, Santa Maria in Campitelli (May 2022 - October 2022).
- Personal exhibition "Portrait of the Artist..." in the halls of the Russian Academy of Arts. Moscow, Prechistenka 21 (November - December 2023)
- Personal exhibition - Strangers in the Gallery of «Bevilacqua la Masa». Venice, Piazza San Marco, 71/C (September 2024 - January 2025)
