= Vladimir Morozov =

Vladimir Morozov may refer to:

- Vladimir Morozov (diplomat), Russian diplomat, see List of Ambassadors of Russia to Brunei
- Vladimir Morozov (filmmaker), Russian film director and screenwriter
- Vladimir Morozov (figure skater) (born 1992), Russian pair skater
- Vladimir Morozov (swimmer) (born 1992), Russian swimmer
- Vladimir Ivanovich Morozov (1940) (1940 – 2023), Soviet canoer who competed from the mid-1960s to the early 1970s
- Vladimir Ivanovich Morozov (born 1952), Soviet canoer who competed in the late 1970s
- Vladimir Nikolayevich Morozov (footballer) (born 1977), Russian footballer

== See also ==
- Vladimirs Morozovs (born 1966), Latvian weightlifter
