= Aleksandr Morozov =

Aleksandr Morozov, Alexander Morozov or Oleksandr Morozov may refer to the following notable people

- Alexander Morozov (artist) (born 1974), Russian artist
- Aleksandr Morozov (athlete) (born 1939), Soviet middle-distance runner
- Aleksandr Morozov (composer) (born 1948), Russian singer and composer
- Aleksandr Morozov (engineer) (1904–1979), Soviet engineer and designer of tanks
- Aleksandr Morozov (footballer) (born 2006), Russian footballer
- Aleksandr Morozov (painter) (1835–1904), Russian genre painter and engraver
