= Vlado Goreski =

Vlado Goreski – Rafik
- Владо Ѓорески – Рафик
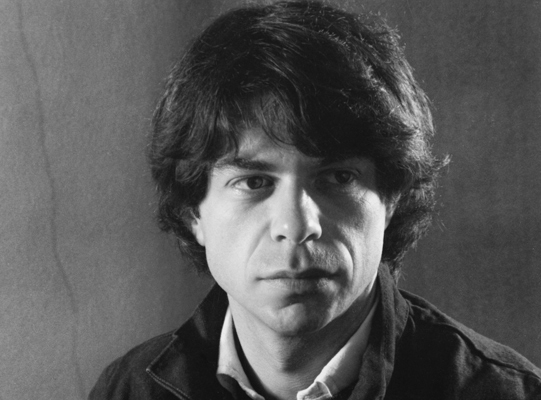
- Born: 21 April 1958; Bitola, SR Macedonia, Yugoslavia (present-day North Macedonia)
- Known for: Graphic artist, scenographer, poster design

Vlado Goreski – Rafik (Macedonian: Владо Ѓорески – Рафик; born 21 April 1958) is a Macedonian-Slovenian graphic artist and scenographer.

== Biography ==
Goreski was born on 21 April 1958 in Bitola. He finished secondary school in Bitola and graduated at the Faculty of Philosophy – Skopje, Department History of Art at 1981. He has studied at the International Centre of Graphic Arts in Ljubljana, Slovenia.

In 1980 he began to volunteer, and in 1981 he was employed as painter-artist at the National Theatre Bitola. In 1982 he was employed in Institute, Museum and Gallery in Bitola as curator of contemporary art.

He had his first solo exhibition in 1981, and since then he is permanently present with solo and collective exhibitions in the country and abroad. On the field of art critics he is present primarily in the graphics art, but he does not neglect the other art parts. His artistic affirmation turns internationally as well, as jury member, selector and expert consultant:

He is member of the international jury of the Graphic Biennial in Varna, Bulgaria. He was member of the International Jury of Gallery of World Drawing in Skopje, North Macedonia.

He was selector of authors, representatives of the country of North Macedonia, and presenter of the collection of the International Graphic Triennial – Bitola at the Graphic Triennial in Chamalières, France. In addition, he presents artists from other countries at this triennial.

He was expert consultant and participated in organizing the 2nd International Graphic Biennial, Čačak, Serbia, 2014 – 2020

== Work ==
Vlado Goreski is Art Director of International Triennial of Graphic Art in Bitola, North Macedonia, and International Biennial Of Miniature Art Graphics And Drawings Bitola IBMB-Bitola, 2023 and he is employed as curator of contemporary arts at the national Institute, Museum and Gallery Bitola.

=== Painting ===
In artistic creation, he devoted himself mostly to graphic art. He mostly creates in aquatint technique, drypoint as well as digital graphics. Stylistically - his work has an expressionistic expression, as well as conceptual touches of mysticism, spirituality, metaphysics and grotesque surrealism. He creates numerous cycles in which apocalyptic surrealism and symbolic expressionist grotesque prevail.

He participated in numerous solo and collective exhibitions in numerous centers around the world: Slovenia,;Croatia,;France,;England,;Italy,;Mexico,;Poland – Graphic triennial Kraków, Biennial of miniature graphics in Łódź,;Russia,;Japan,;Moldova,;Hungary,;Australia,;Turkey,;Brazil,;Argentina,;Serbia,;Armenia,;Romania...

As a graphic artist, he participated in almost all significant graphic manifestations:2nd International Exhibition "SMALL FORM OF GRAPHIC 13x18 – Dialogue workshop with the number", 2014/2015, Końskich, Radomiu, Kielcah, Busku-Zbroju, Poland; Osten museum of drawing – Vlado Goreski-Rafik; Museo de la grafica, Pisa, Italy, et Paolo Ciampini (Pisa, Museo de la grafica, Italy, et Paolo Ciampini); 9 Trienniale Mondiale de petit format Fire, water, earth, 2014, Shumen, Bulgaria Chamаlières, France, 2014; Tribuna Graphic, 2014, Museum of Art Cluj; Fire, water, earth, 2014, Fire, water, earth, 2014,Shumen, Bulgaria FIRE, WATER, EARTH;Fire, water, earth, 2013, Gourin, France; 7th International Triennial of Graphic Art Bitola, 2012; International art projects, 2012, Shumen, Bulgaria; 6th International Triennial of Graphic Art Bitola, 2009; World gallery of drawings – Osten, 2009; 4th International Triennial of Graphic Art Bitola, 2003 (group Sibelius); 2nd International Biennial of Small Graphic, 2003, Tetovo (group Sibelius); Solo exhibition, Prilep, 2002, 37th MTF "Vojdan Chernodrinski"; Solo exhibition, Skopje, 2001, Young Open Theatre;La Bellone, Bruxelles, 2000; Grafikusmuveszek,Debrecen, Hungary, 2000; Print Biennial, Seoul, 2000; 123rd International Triennial of Graphic Art Bitola, 2000 (group Sibelius); 3rd International Triennial of Graphic Art Bitola, 2000 (Vlado – Angels’ mass);Balkan, exhibition of graphic,Subotica and Novi Sad, Serbia, 1999; Norwegian international print triennale,Fredrikstad,1997;Solo exhibition, Bitola, 1981...

== Gallery ==
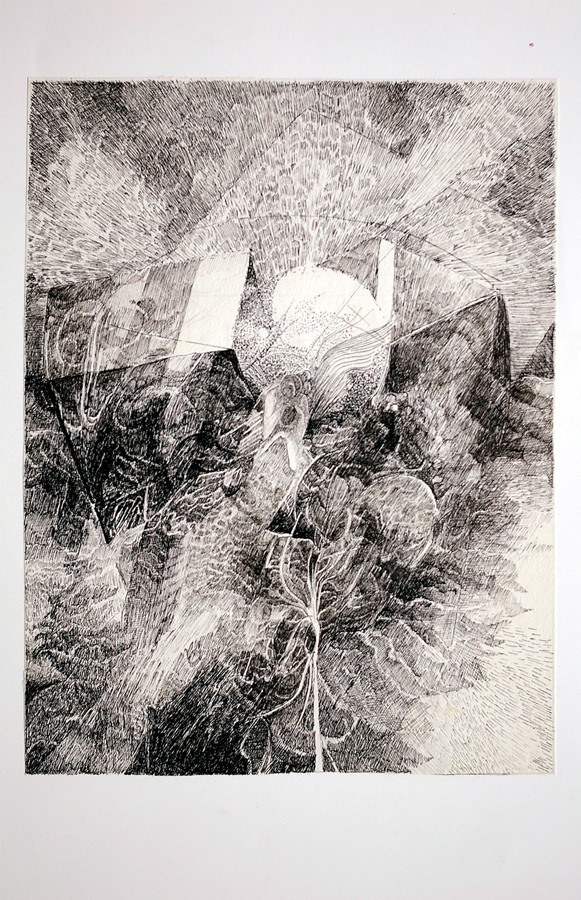
"Flight", ink, chinese shower

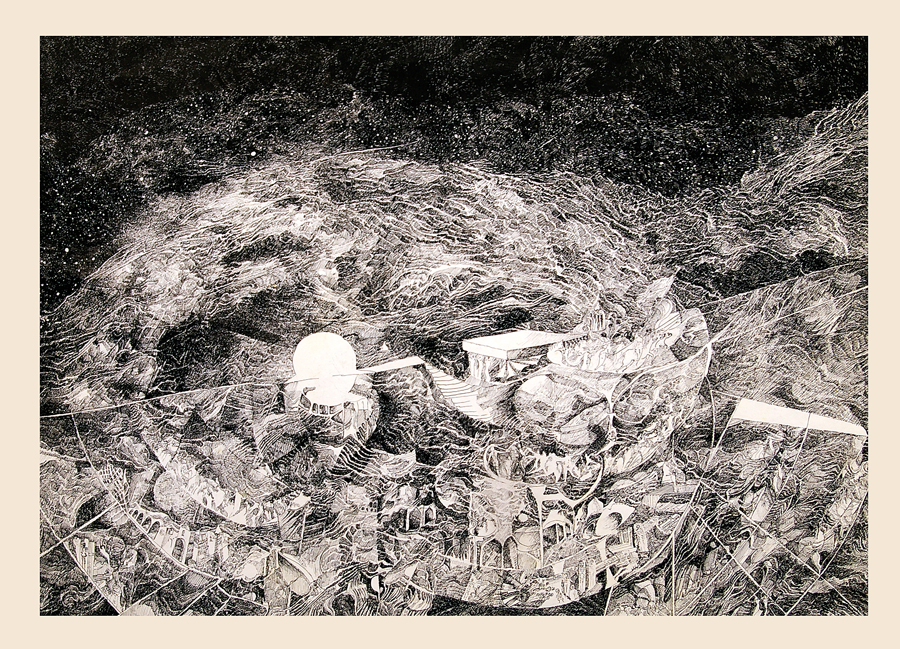
Last Island, etching

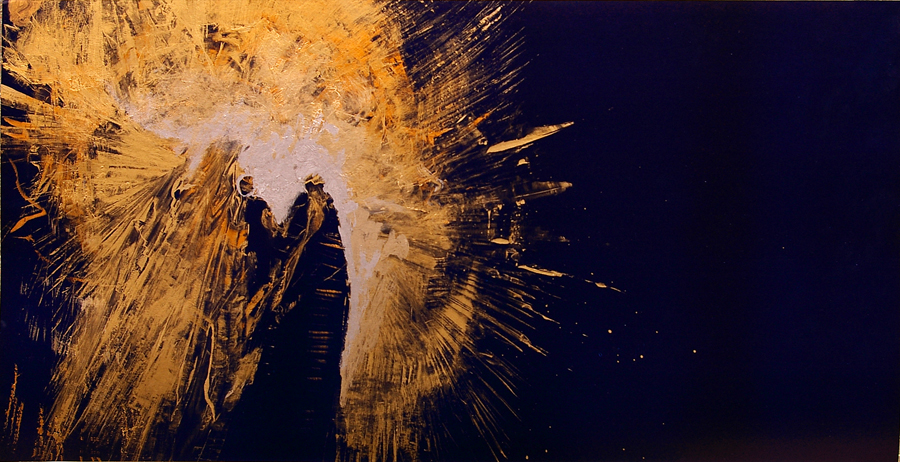
Ecstasy - Flight, oil on canvas

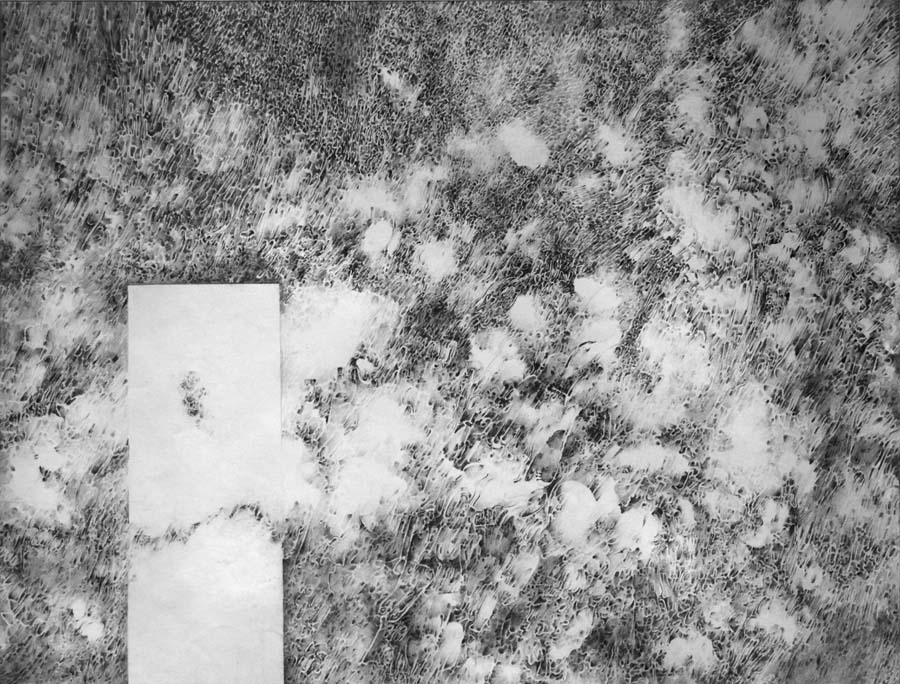
XVII, pencil

=== Scenography ===
Vlado Goreski is present on the theatre stage for many years and had many awards and positive critics for his scenographies.

His scenographies are present in many theatres in the country and abroad.

More significant scenographic projects:Drama Theatre in Skopje-Hamlet (1997 and 2012); Jona Dab; All faces of Petre Andreevski; Archelaos or Euripides comes back home; Theatre of Turkey, Skopje-Romeo and Juliet; Gilgamesh; Tartuffe; I am Orhan too; Macedonian National Theatre-Delirium for Two; The life is dream; National Theatre Strumica-Dossier Strindberg; The last day of Misirkov; National Theatre Prilep- Roberto Zucco; Colonel bird;Wife for the colonel; Lighthouse; Poor life; National Theatre Bitola-The Brothers Karamazov;The Master and Margarita; Underground republic; Refugee;The house of Bernarda Alba;Notre femme de Paris; Rodopa Drama Theatre, Smolyan-FTM to the one who started first (F... the mother to the one who started first);City Theatre "Marin Drzic", Dubrovnik, Croatia-The brothers Karamazov;

== Gallery ==
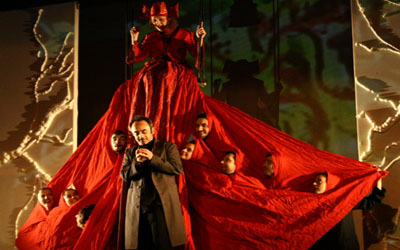
All faces of Petre Andreevski

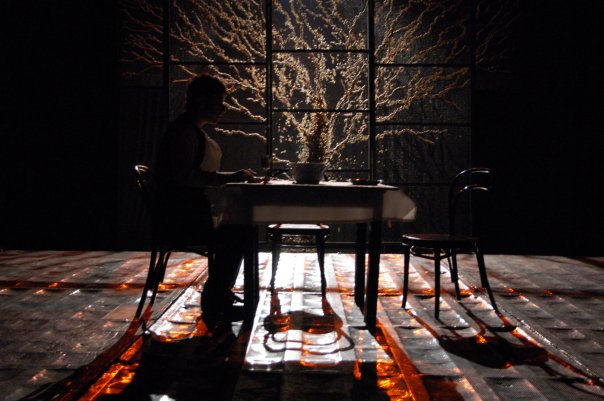
The Brothers Karamazov

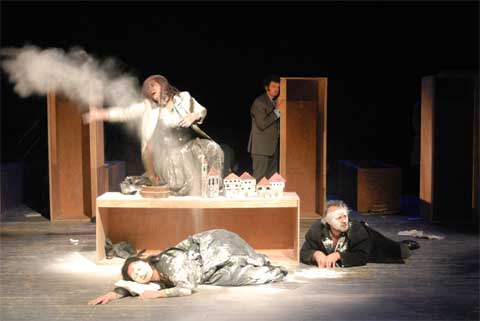
Misirkov

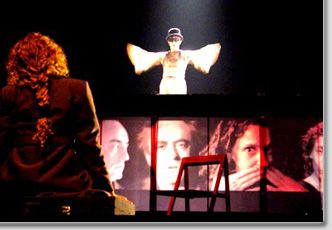
Delirium for Two

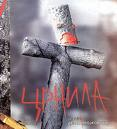
Blackness

=== Art critic ===
His critic essays start from the local, artistic Bitola milieu, and through the Balkan space they broaden worldwide: Agatha Gertchen, Poland; Dimitar Kochevski – Micho, Macedonia; Djurić – Džamonja; Leonardo Gotlieb, Argentina; Marc Frising, Belgium; Maurice Pasternak, Belgium; Paolo Ciampini, Italy; Sveto Manev, Macedonia; Slobodan Jevtic, France...

=== Design of theatre posters ===
Vlado Goreski is the author of many theatre posters for which he received numerous awards. He prepared the posters for the following theatre productions:The Master and Margarita – Bulgakov, National Theatre Bitola; The threepenny Opera – Brecht, National Theatre Prilep;Don Quixote – Cervantes, National Theatre Stip; The Police –Mrozek, National Theatre Ohrid;The brothers Karamazov – Dostoyevski, City Theatre Dubrovnik, Croatia; FTM to the one who started first – Dukovski, Rodopa Drama Theatre, Smolyan, Bulgaria, etc.

=== Original projects ===
- The Gospel according to the shadows (with Vlado Cvetanovski) – National Theatre Bitola
- I'm Orhan too – Theatre of Turkey, Skopje
- Dossier Strindberg – National Theatre Strumica
- Adaptation of "The eighth wonder of the world" – Jordan Plevneš, National Theatre Bitola

== Awards ==
He has won over twenty national and international awards for art achievements:

2012 – Award for the best advertising material for the performance "The Police" (Theatre Ohrid); 2011 – Award for the best advertising material for the performance "Hamlet" (Drama theatre – Skopje); 2010 – Award for the best advertising material for the performance "The brothers Karamazov" (National Theatre Bitola); 2009 – Award for the best advertising material for the performance "The last day of Misirkov" (National Theatre "Anton Panov" – Strumica); 2008 – Award for the best advertising material for the performance "Refugee" (National Theatre Stip); 2008 – Award for the best scenography for the performance "Refugee" (National Theatre Stip); 2007 – Award for the best advertising material for the performance "Tartuffe" (National Theatre Stip); 2006 – Award for the best advertising material for the performance "Roberto Zucco" (National Theatre Prilep); 2003 – Award for the best advertising material for the performance "The Lower Depths" (National Theatre Bitola); 1998 – Award for the best scenography for the performance "Colonel bird" (National Theatre Prilep); 1998 – Award for the best advertising material for the performance "Colonel bird" (National Theatre Prilep); 1996 – Award for scenography for the performance "The Master and Margarita" (National Theatre Bitola); 1994 – Award for the performance "Notre femme de Paris" (National Theatre Bitola); 1991 – Award for scenography for the performance "Underground republic" (National Theatre Bitola); Award – Premium of the Biennial of Contemporary International Graphic Art, Moldova.; Award – Premium at the International Graphic Biennale in Bucharest, Romania.; Graphic Award of the Central Library of Madrid, Spain...

== Bibliography ==
- Vlado Goreski- „Nocturne" II, 2019
- Vlado Goreski – „Drypoint" II
- Vlado Goreski – „Drypoint" I
- Vlado Goreski – „Drypoint" IV – Cathedral
- Vlado Goreski – „Nocturne" I
- Vlado Goreski – „Drypoint" III
- Vlado Goreski – „Drypoint" IV
- Vlado Goreski – „Miniature graphics"
- Vlado Goreski – „Miniature graphics"
- Vlado Goreski – „Ex Libris – Ex Litera"
- Vlado Goreski – Vladimir Simonovski – „Large format graphics"
