= Georgy Fedorovich Morozov =

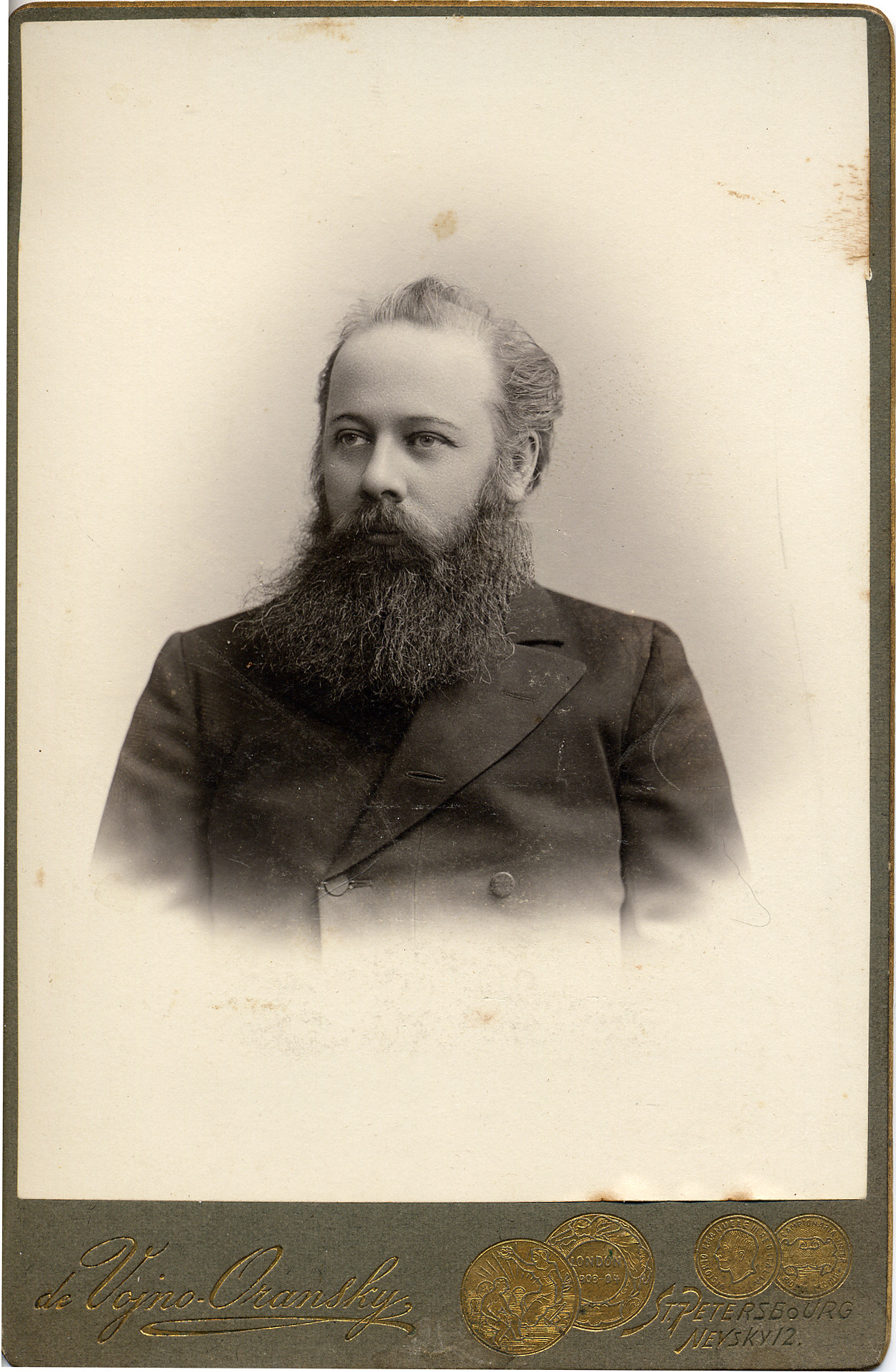

Georgy Fedorovich Morozov (Russian: Гео́ргий Фёдорович Моро́зов; 7 January 1867 – 9 May 1920) was a Russian forester and biologist who introduced the first ecological ideas to classify forest types. He introduced ideas of "the forest as a plant society", which he developed into the definition of the forest as a complex biogeocenotic, geographic and historical phenomenon that was made up of non-living and living components.

== Life ==
Morozov was born in St. Petersburg, Russia, where his father worked in a linen drapery. He went to the military academy at Pavlovsk and graduated in 1886 as a second lieutenant. When posted in Latvia, he met several students including the exiled revolutionary Olga Zandrok. After her period of exile had ended, he left the army, moved back to St. Petersburg with Olga and began to study the agricultural sciences at the Institute of Forestry. Morozov's father disowned him, and he was left to earn his own living by teaching while he studied.

He studied botany under I.P. Borodin and was influenced by the soil scientist P.A. Kostichev, the zoologist N.A. Kholodkovsky and at the Zandrok household by the anatomist and family friend Peter Lesgaft. Lesgaft had been dismissed from St. Petersburg University for his political views but gave private lessons in anatomy, and Morozov attended them. That gave him a firm founding in evolution and comparative anatomy. Morozov graduated in 1893 and was grief-stricken when Olga Zandrok died from diphtheria. He later married Olga's sister Lidia Nikolaevna.

Morozov worked as a forester in the Khrenovk forest preserve in Voronezh gubernia. In 1896, he was sent to study forest management in Germany and Switzerland and spent time at the Eberswalde Academy with Professor Adam Friedrich Schwappach. On his return, he was posted to the Voronezh province to examine afforestation measures. The forest had been planned by the soil scientist Vasily Dokuchaev to manage droughts. There, Morozovexamined the growth of pine and wrote his first work. In 1899, he wrote a work on forests and soils after he had examined Dokuchaev's works. Morozov worked with Dokuchaev and G. I. Tanfilyev.

In 1901, Morozov was posted as professor of forestry in St. Petersburg. Morozov introduced the term "silvics" and considered the forest to be a connected and complex system, rather than a mere collection of trees. He examined the development of forests, plant succession and harvesting practices. He was also involved in higher education. In 1917, he suffered poor health and moved to Yalta. In 1918, he took up a position at the new university in Simferopol, where he died about two years later.
