= Alla Kliouka =

Belarusian-Russian actress (born 1970)

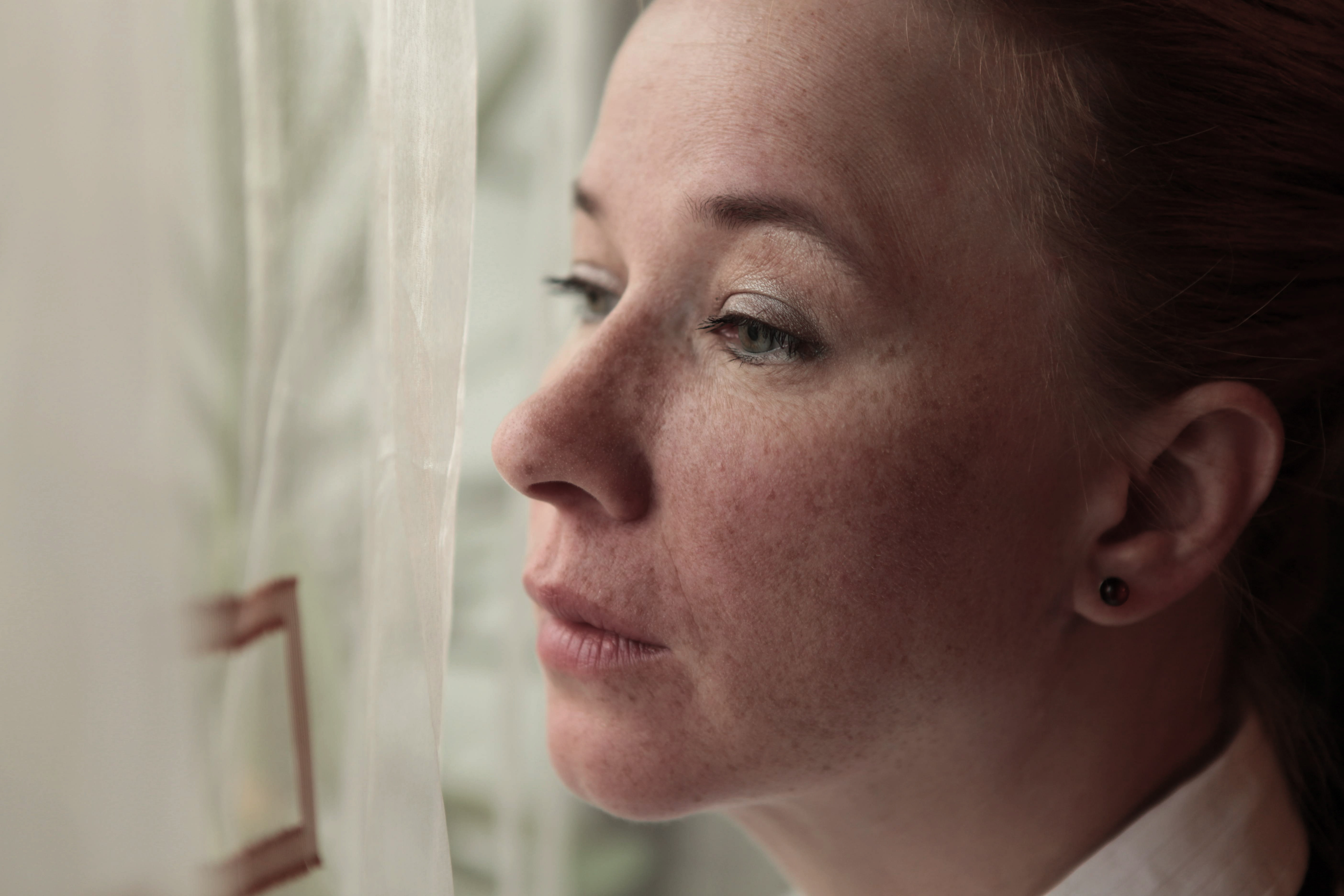
- Alla Kliouka in Moscow, 2010
- Born: 18 February 1970 (age 56); Minsk, Byelorussian SSR, Soviet Union (present-day Belarus)
- Years active: 1989–present
- Spouse(s): Ken Schaffer (divorced); Vladimir Morozov (divorced)
- Children: Kibo Schaffer and Ivan Morozov

Alla Kliouka (born 18 February 1970) is a Belarusian-Russian actress best known for her role as Svetlana Kirilenko on the HBO TV series The Sopranos. She was previously married to American inventor Ken Schaffer and to Russian film director Vladimir Morozov. She has two children.

== Filmography ==
=== Film ===
Year	Title	Role	Notes
1990	Sdelano v SSSR	Sysoyeva	
1990	Telo	Svetlana	
1991	Cloud-Paradise	Natasha	Prize for Best Acting Ensemble
1992	Chopin's Nocturne	She	
1994	Serp i molot	Yelizaveta Voronina	Prize Green Apple Award for the Best Actress
1996	From Hell to Hell	Anna Sikorskaya	Prize For Best Actress at Kinotavr
1998	Khochu v tyurmu	Mary	
2002	Prikovannyy	Anna	Prize for the Best Actress at the First International Festival of CIS and Baltic countries New Cinema XXI Century
2005	Kolya-Perekati pole	Natalya	
2005	Melyuzga	Lipochka	
2011	Noch na zakate leta	Ruth	

=== Television ===
Year	Title	Role	Notes
2001	Idealnaya para	Anna	
2000–2002	The Sopranos	Svetlana Kirilenko	Reoccurring role; 7 episodes
2002	Law and Order: Criminal Intent	Itlana Yuska	1 episode
2003–2006	Evlampiya Romanova. The investigation leads the layman	Evlampiya Romanova	Main role
2008	Adrenalin: Odin protiv vsekh	Rita	
2015	The Mysteries of Laura	Olga	1 episode
2017	The Americans	Ekaterina Rykova	3 episodes
2019	The Marvelous Mrs. Maisel	Woman worker	1 episode
