= Morozov =

Morozov may refer to:

- Morozov (crater), a lunar crater
- Morozov (surname), people with the surname Morozov

== See also ==
- Kharkiv Morozov Machine Building Design Bureau (KMDB), a Ukrainian state-owned tank design bureau
- Pavlik Morozov (1918–1932), play by Ukrainian writer Les Podervyansky
- Morozova Mansion, neo-Gothic mansion in Moscow
- Morozovsky (disambiguation)
