= Multclub =

Multclub a series of satirical cartoons on current Belarusian issues created by The Third Way community. It was founded in 2004 by Pavel Marozau, Aleh Minich, and Andrei Abozau.

== History of the project ==
In 2005 Marozau and Abozau was charged with slandering the president of the Republic of Belarus according to article 367 of the Criminal Code. The article provides for a jail term of two to four years. The cause for the charges was the production of a Multclub satirical animation about current Belarusian issues in which several characters resembled Alexander Lukashenko and his confidants. Thanks to assistance from international community and press, they avoided arrest, but had to apply for political asylum in Estonia.
