= Nikolai Morozov =

Nikolai Morozov may refer to:

- Nikolai Morozov (revolutionary) (1854–1946), Russian revolutionary and scientist, forerunner of the pseudoscientific New Chronology
- Nikolai Morozov (figure skater) (born 1975), figure skater
- Nikolai Morozov (footballer) (1916–1981), Russian football coach
- Nikolai Morozov (politician), Soviet politician, see Central Committee elected by the 26th Congress of the Communist Party of the Soviet Union
