= Alexey Morosov =

Artist

- Born: Alexey Viktorovich Morozov; 26 September 1974 (age 52); Bishkek, Kirghiz SSR, Soviet Union
- Education: Moscow Surikov State Academic Institute of Fine Arts
- Known for: contemporary art
- Notable work: Pontifex Maximvs (Naples), Exodus (Pisa)
- Website: www.morosovart.com

Alexey Viktorovich Morosov (Russian: Алексей Викторович Морозов; born 26 September 1974) is a contemporary artist, who lives and works in Italy. He studied under Lev Kerbel and Hugo Maniser and became known for installations, sculpture, and paintings that reinterpret Hellenistic art. A full member of the Russian Academy of Arts since 2013.

== Biography ==
Alexey Morosov was born on 26 September 1974 in Bishkek, Kirghiz SSR. He studied architecture in Frunze Polytechnic Institute, but moved to the RSFSR before obtaining a diploma. In 1992, he won one of the main prizes of the 2nd Saint Petersburg Biennale of Contemporary Art. In 1999, he graduated from the Moscow Surikov State Academic Institute of Fine Arts, where he studied under the renowned Soviet sculptor Lev Kerbel and the drawer Hugo Maniser, who became his long-term mentors and friends. He also spent a year in Provence studying French sculpture and practicing with terracotta. Upon returning from France, he got close to Timur Novikov, the founder of the neo-academic New Academy of Fine Arts.

In 2011, Morosov presented 60 works from 10 years of his career in his first solo museum exhibition named Antologia in the Marble Palace of the Russian Museum in Saint Petersburg.

Since 2006, Morosov has spent most of his time in Italy, mastering the use of Carrara marble, casting bronze sculpture exclusively in Italian workshops, and drawing inspiration from Italian culture. In the mid-2010s, Morosov moved permanently to Italy and settled in Lucca.

== Artistic style ==
Morosov's artistic style is strongly influenced by his academic background in the arts and by his hands-on mastery. Morosov is serious about authorship and authenticity of his works: he makes sketches, models, drawings, and paintings by himself, and works alone, except for of large artworks that require an assistant. He models organic forms manually and sculpts non-organic objects in ZBrush.

Morosov rethinks and reinterprets Classical Greek and Roman art, seeking harmony between the traditional iconography and contemporary art. Morosov's recurring characters are kores, kouroses, and caryatides, who experience the hopes and fears of a modern human.

They exist in an artistic metaverse and reappear in many works akin to comic book characters. In Morosov's works, artifacts from different eras, such as the Upper Paleolithic, Neolithic, Enlightenment, and Post-industrial eras, hold equal value and coexist in the same context.

== Projects ==
Since 2011, Morosov has developed a trilogy of installations exploring the cultural matrix of European identity. The first project, Pontifex Maximvs, was presented in 2016 in Naples. The second project, named Exodus, took place in Pisa in 2024.

=== Pontifex Maximvs ===
In Pontifex Maximvs (Latin: The Great Bridge-builder), Morosov approaches the concept of bridge as a connection between present and past, East and West, cultural traditions of different eras, and a space of collective energy.

The pilot of the installation was presented as a special project of the 6th Moscow Biennale of Contemporary Art. In 2016, Pontifex Maximvs was presented at the National Archaeological Museum in Naples, with Morosov's works exhibited alongside the artifacts of Pompeii, Herculaneum, and Paestum.

The exhibition was a joint project of the National Archeological Museum and the Moscow Museum of Modern Art (MMoMA), supported by the Ministry of Culture of Italy. In 2017, Pontifex Maximvs was exhibited in MMoMA. The exhibitions were curated by Kristina Krasnyanskaya and Alessandro Romanini.

=== La Rondine ===
La Rondine (Italian: The Swallow), a collective project named after Giacomo Puccini's opera, was presented in Lucca in 2018 as a part of the Puccini Days festival. La Rondine included the works of Alexey Morosov, writer Nikolai Lilin, and musician Federico De Robertis, who re-reflected on the scenography, text, and music of the original work. The artists were joined by curator Alessandro Romanini.

In La Rondine, Morosov researched the identity of a woman and her journey from victim to a hero via Puccini's protagonist Magda, using references to the Norman conquest of southern Italy, Soviet Gulag, and Anton Chekhov's Chaika. Some artworks created for La Rondine became a part of his next project, Exodus.

=== Exodus ===
Exodus, the second part of Morosov's trilogy, was exhibited in Pisa from June to October 2024. The public display was organized by the administration of the Commune of Pisa and StArt Attitude Association and supported by the Regional Council of Tuscany and the administration of the Province of Pisa.

Exodus included several installations at historic locations and heritage sites of Pisa, namely Santa Maria della Spina, Palazzo Blu, Torre Guelfa, Arno embankment, and Piazza dei Miracoli. Four site-specific installations were created in Santa Maria della Spina (Casa Metanoia) and three levels of Torre Guelfa (Casa Socerdotе, Casa Anatomica, Casa degli Ucelli). The concept of exodus in Morosov's project has been interpreted in numerous ways: as a next step for human civilization marked by massive changes comparable to the Neolithic Revolution, or as a narrative about migration and identity.

=== Manuport ===
The final episode of Morosov's trilogy,Manuport, is dedicated to the rediscovery of art.

== Public works ==
In 2014, the monument to the founders of the Moscow Art Theatre, Konstantin Stanislavski and Vladimir Nemirovich-Danchenko, created by Morosov, was inaugurated adjacent to the theatre. The sculptures were cast in bronze in Pietrasanta and placed on a Finnish granite base made in Verona.

Morosov created the monument to Kyrgyz writer, journalist, and philosopher Chingiz Aitmatov, which was inaugurated in the Villa Grazioli park in Rome in 2025. The monument combines elements of Classical sculpture and visual deconstruction. The sculpture was made of Carrara marble and installed on a travertine base.

== Other works ==
Morosov designed the 2016 Lucca Film Festival awards for the best feature movie, short film, and achievements in art.

== Exhibitions and collections ==
Morosov had solo and group exhibitions in Naples, Pisa, Lucca, and other Italian cities, Singapore, London, Istanbul, Saint Petersburg, and Moscow. The National Archaeological Museum, Naples, the Russian Museum, and the New Academy Museum have Morosov's works in their collections. A limited number of his works were sold at Sotheby's, Christie's, and Phillips. The Art Newspaper recognized Morosov as one of the most expensive living artists of Russian origin in 2016, 20021 and 2024.

=== Solo exhibitions ===
- 2002 — Magos, Vicenza, Italy
- 2003 — Craft Deco Academic, The New Academy, Saint Petersburg
- 2003 — Craft Deco Classic, D137 Gallery, Saint Petersburg.
- 2004 — Constantinopolis, ArtPlay, Moscow
- 2011 — Antologia, Russian Museum, Saint Petersburg.
- 2012 — Cariatide Supersonic, Piazza Bra, Verona, Italy
- 2014 — Morosov MMXIV, Heritage Gallery, Moscow
- 2015 — Cantata iTunes, Pietrasanta, Italy
- 2015 — Pontifex Maximvs (a special project of the 6th Moscow Biennale), Moscow
- 2016 — Pontifex Maximvs, National Archaeological Museum of Naples, Naples, Italy
- 2017 — Pontifex_Maximvs/Le Stanze, Moscow Museum of Modern Art, Moscow
- 2024 — Exodus, Pisa, Italy

=== Group exhibitions ===
- 2013 — Art Stage Singapore, Singapore
- 2013 — Cariatide Supersonic, Maison et Objet, Paris
- 2015 — Antropomakhia, Istanbul Contemporary Art Fair, Istanbul, Turkey
- 2019 — La Rondine, Palazzo delle Esposizioni, Lucca
- 2022 — Art Rizoma, Calabria, Italy

== Public activities ==
Since 2013, Morosov has been a member of the Russian Academy of Arts. From 2013 to 2017, he was also a member of the Presidium of the RAA and the head of the Moscow Academic Art School.
