= Mikhail Morozov =

Mikhail Morozov (Russian: Михаил Морозов) may refer to the following people:

- Mikhail Mikhailovich Morozov (1897-1952), Russian Shakespeare scholar and translator
- Mikhail Morozov (art collector) (1870-1903), Russian businessman, art collector and patron of art
