= Morozovsky (rural locality) =

Set index of articles associated with the same name

Morozovsky (Russian: Морозовский; masculine), Morozovskaya (Морозовская; feminine), or Morozovskoye (Морозовское; neuter) is the name of several rural localities in Russia:

- Morozovsky, Krasnodar Krai, a khutor in Borodinsky Rural Okrug of Primorsko-Akhtarsky District of Krasnodar Krai
- Morozovsky, Nizhny Novgorod Oblast, a pochinok in Luzhaysky Selsoviet of the town of oblast significance of Shakhunya in Nizhny Novgorod Oblast
- Morozovsky, Orenburg Oblast, a khutor in Oktyabrsky Selsoviet of Oktyabrsky District of Orenburg Oblast
- Morozovsky, Kromskoy District, Oryol Oblast, a settlement in Apalkovsky Selsoviet of Kromskoy District of Oryol Oblast
- Morozovsky, Mtsensky District, Oryol Oblast, a settlement in Karandakovsky Selsoviet of Mtsensky District of Oryol Oblast
- Morozovsky, Sverdlovsky District, Oryol Oblast, a settlement in Kotovsky Selsoviet of Sverdlovsky District of Oryol Oblast
- Morozovsky, Rostov Oblast, a khutor in Nizhnebykovskoye Rural Settlement of Verkhnedonskoy District of Rostov Oblast
- Morozovsky, Volgograd Oblast, a khutor in Mirny Selsoviet of Novonikolayevsky District of Volgograd Oblast
- Morozovskoye, a selo in Stepanovskoye Settlement of Galichsky District of Kostroma Oblast
- Morozovskaya, a village in Luzyansky Rural Okrug of Darovskoy District of Kirov Oblast
