= Anatoly Morozov =

Anatoly Morozov may refer to:

- Anatoly Morozov (pilot) (1916–1944), Soviet World War II pilot and Hero of the Soviet Union
- Anatoly Morozov (scientist) (born 1939), Ukrainian scientist
- Anatoly Morozov (athlete) (born 1973), Russian football player
