= Vladimir Morozov (filmmaker) =

Russian film director and screenwriter (born 1958)

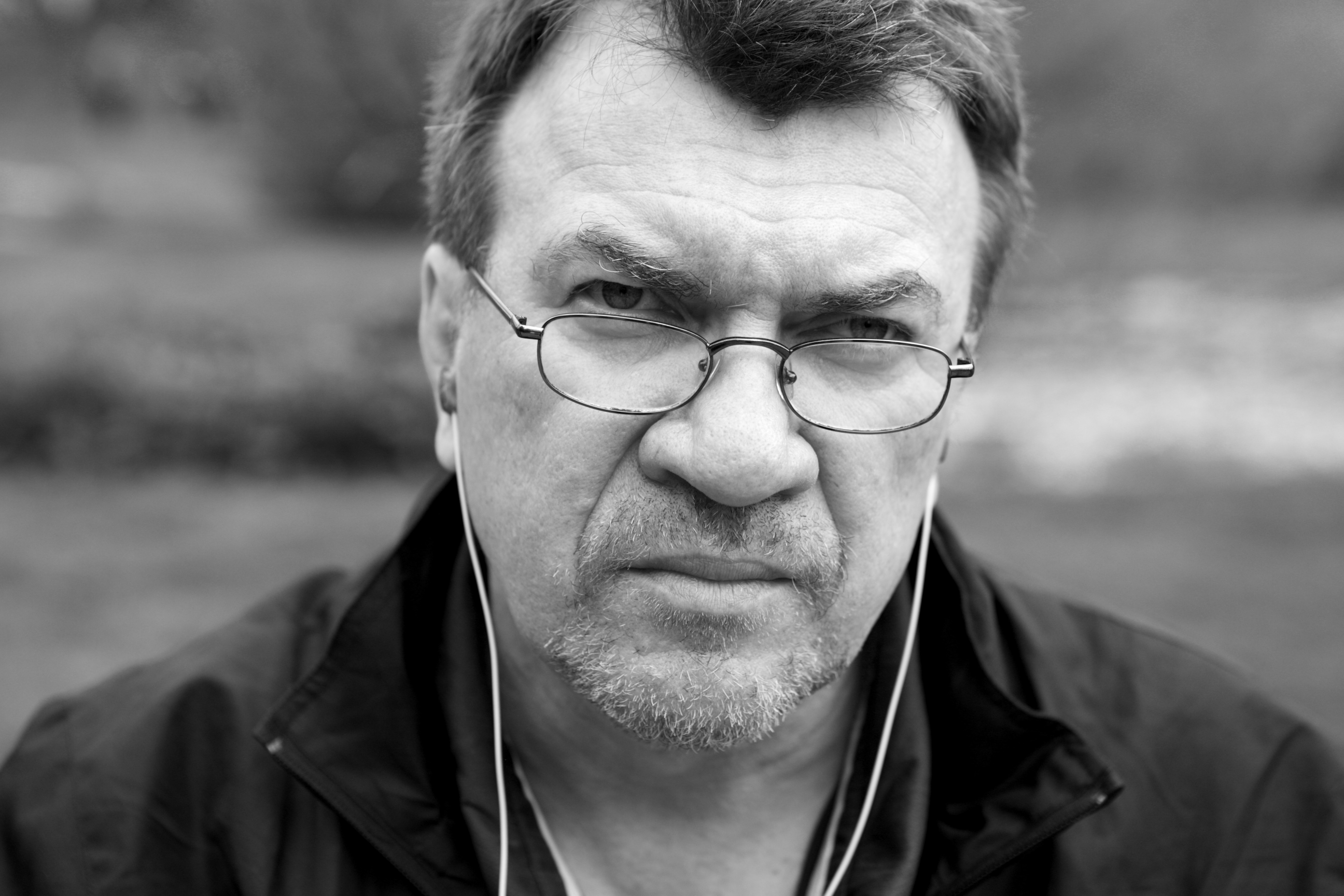
- Vladimir Morozov in New York, 2016
- Born: 11 May 1958 (age 66); Moscow, USSR
- Years active: 1996–present
- Spouse(s): Tatyana Semyonova (divorced); Alla Kliouka
- Children: 4

Vladimir Alekseevich Morozov (born May 11, 1958) is a Russian film director and screenwriter, best known for his work in his TV show Evlampiya Romanova. In 1995, Morozov finished at the Russian Institute of Cinematography. He has worked in the film studio "Mosfilm" from 1989. He is married to actress Alla Kliouka and has three sons and a daughter.

== Filmography ==
=== Film ===
Year	Title	Genre	Position
1996	Arrival of a train	Documentary	Writer/Director
1998	Rehearsal with "Arnold"	Short Film	Writer/Director
2005	Melyuzga	Feature Film	Co-writer/Director
2006	Вечерний звон	Feature Film	Co-writer/Co-director
2010	Whisky s Molokom	Feature Film	Writer
2019	Protocol of Understanding	Documentary	Writer/Director

=== Television ===
Year	Title	Genre	Position
2001	Cheryomushki	Social Drama	Co-writer/Director
2002- 2006	Evlampiya Romanova. The investigation is led by a layman.	Detective	Co-writer/Director
2008	Adrenalin: Odin protiv vsekh	Drama	Co-writer/Director
2012	Kazaki	Documentary	Writer/Director
2012	Kazachiy Ataman	Documentary	Writer/Director
2013	And The War Did Not Kill Me	Documentary	Writer/Director
