= Sergey Morozov =

Sergey Morozov, Sergei Morozov, or Serhiy Morozov may refer to:

- Sergey Morozov (fighter) (born 1989), Russian mixed martial artist
- Sergey Morozov (footballer, born 1989), Russian football centre back
- Serhiy Morozov (footballer, born 1950) (1950–2021), Soviet international football player and Ukrainian football coach
- Serhiy Morozov (footballer, born 1961), Ukrainian football forward
- Sergey Morozov (racewalker) (born 1988), Russian race walker
- Sergey Morozov (politician) (born 1959), Russian politician
- Sergey Morozov, businessman, creator of Grand Maket Rossiya, private museum
