= Yury Morozov (disambiguation) =

Yury Morozov (born 1949), is the former Prime Minister of South Ossetia.

Yury Morozov may also refer to:

- Yuri Morozov (ice hockey) (born 1938), Soviet ice hockey player
- Yury Morozov (footballer, born 1934) (1934–2005), Russian football coach
- Yury Morozov (footballer, born 1985), Russian football player
- Yuri Morozov (musician) (1948–2006), Russian musician
