= Mraz =

Mraz or Mráz (Czech/Slovak feminine: Mrázová) is a surname of Czech, Slovak, and Croatian origin. It means "frost" and is cognate to Maroz (Belarusian), Mróz (Polish), and Moroz (Ukrainian and Russian). It may refer to:

== People ==
- Alois Mráz (born 1978), Czech handball player
- Bruno Mráz (born 1993), Slovak ice hockey player
- Franjo Mraz (1910–1981), Croatian artist
- George Mraz (1944–2021), Czech jazz bassist
- Gustáv Mráz (1934–2025), Slovak footballer
- Ivan Mráz (1941–2024), Czechoslovak footballer
- Ivana Mrázová (born 1992), Czech-born Italian model
- Jason Mraz (born 1977), American singer-songwriter
- Kateřina Mrázová (figure skater) (born 1972), Czech ice dancer
- Kateřina Mrázová (ice hockey) (born 1992), Czech ice hockey player
- Ladislav Mráz (1923–1962), Czech opera singer
- Mike Mraz, American musician
- Patrik Mráz (born 1987), Slovak footballer
- Pavel Mráz (born 1974), Czech canoer
- Peter Mráz (footballer, born 1985), Slovak football defender
- Peter Mráz (footballer, born 1975), Slovak football midfielder
- Samuel Mráz (born 1997), Slovak footballer

== Other ==
- Rani Mraz, Yugoslav rock band
- Beneš-Mráz, airplane manufacturer
  - Mráz Sokol, manufactured by Benes
  - Mráz Skaut, manufactured by Benes
