= Mrozek =

Mrozek, Mrożek, and Mrózek are Polish surnames.Notable people with this surname include:

- Bartosz Mrozek (born 2000), Polish footballer
- Fabian Mrozek (born 2003), Polish footballer
- Irmina Mrózek Gliszczyńska (born 1992), Polish sailor
- Jacques Mrozek (born 1950), French figure skater
- Marcin Mrożek (born 1990), Polish cyclist
- Sławomir Mrożek (1930–2013), Polish dramatist
- Tommaso Mrozek (born 2008), Italian-Polish pawn

== See also ==
- Mrozik
- Mroz
