= Mroz =

Mroz or Mróz is a surname. Cognate to Maroz, Moroz and Mraz, it means "frost" in Polish. It is most frequent in southern and eastern Poland.

== People ==
- Brandon Mroz (born 1990), American figure skater
- Daniel Mróz (1917–1993), Polish stage designer and artist
- John Edwin Mroz (1948–2014), American foreign policy writer
- Paul Mross (1919–1991), Polish–German chess master
- Remigiusz Mróz (born 1987), Polish writer and lawyer
- Vincent Mroz (1922–2008), American Secret Service agent
- Zenon Mróz (born 1930), Polish engineer

== See also ==
- Mróz (cycling team), a professional cycling team
- Mrozek
