= Oleg Morozov =

Oleg Morozov may refer to:

- Oleg Morozov (footballer, born 1937) (1937–2006), Soviet international footballer
- Oleg Morozov (footballer, born 1966), Russian footballer
- Oleg Viktorovich Morozov, member of the Federation Council (Russia) representing Tatarstan
