= Igor Morozov =

Igor Morozov may refer to:

- Igor Morozov (baritone) (born 1948), Russian-Ukrainian opera singer
- Igor Morozov (politician) (born 1956), Russian politician
- Igor Morozov (footballer) (born 1989), Estonian professional footballer
