= Aleksandr Morozov (painter) =

Russian realist painter (1835–1904)

- Александр Иванович Морозов
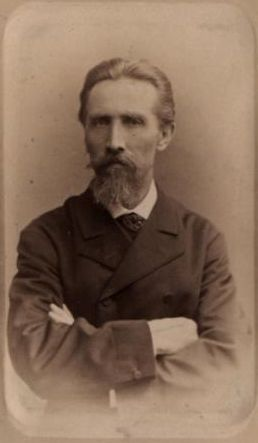
- Alexander Ivanovich Morozov (before 1870)
- Born: May 17, 1835; Saint Petersburg
- Died: November 28, 1904 (aged 69); Saint Petersburg
- Education: Member Academy of Arts (1864)
- Known for: Painting

Alexander Ivanovich Morozov (Russian: Александр Иванович Морозов; 1835—1904) was a Russian genre painter and engraver.

== Biography ==
His father, Ivan Morozov, was also an artist (though of little note) and he began his studies at the Imperial Academy of Arts in 1851, where he studied under Alexey Tarasovich Markov. He received a gold medal in 1861 for his painting "Rest at Haymaking" but, two years later, became part of the "Revolt of the Fourteen", a group of students who supported Realism and opposed the Academy's insistence on promoting the Classical style. Along with the others, he resigned and accepted the designation of "Artist Second-Class". Later, he joined the Artel of Artists, an artistic commune on Vasilievsky Island. The following year, he was awarded the title of Academician for his painting "Leaving Church, in Pskov".

From 1874 until his death, he taught drawing at the Imperial School of Jurisprudence. For many years, he also taught drawing at the "Society for the Encouragement of the Arts".

He was also a regular participant in the "Association of Travelling Art Exhibitions" (Peredvizhniki), although he had some disagreements with their approach and never officially became a member. In addition, he took part in several international exhibitions, including the Weltausstellung 1873 Wien and the Exposition Universelle (1878).

== Selected paintings ==
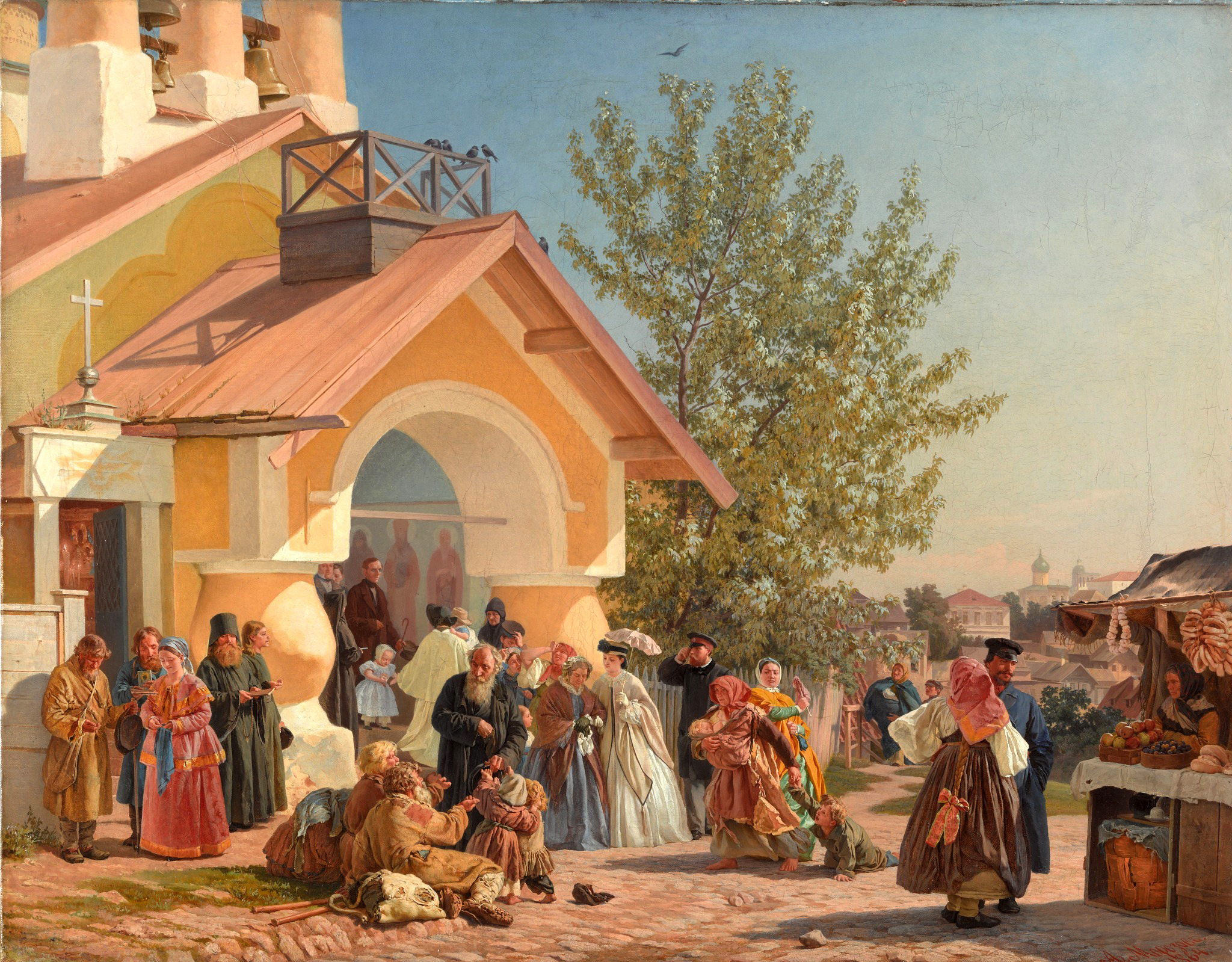
Leaving Church, in Pskov (1864)

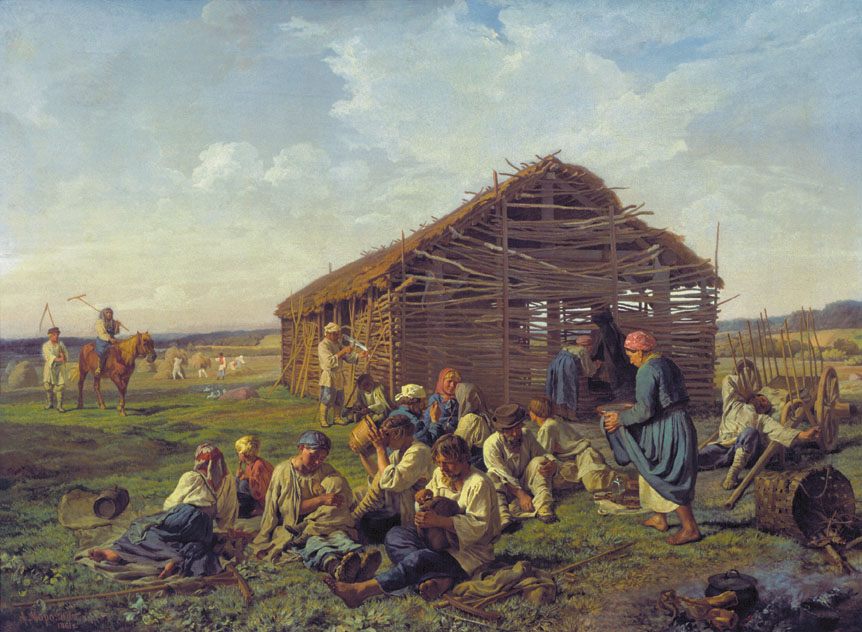
Rest at Haymaking (1861)

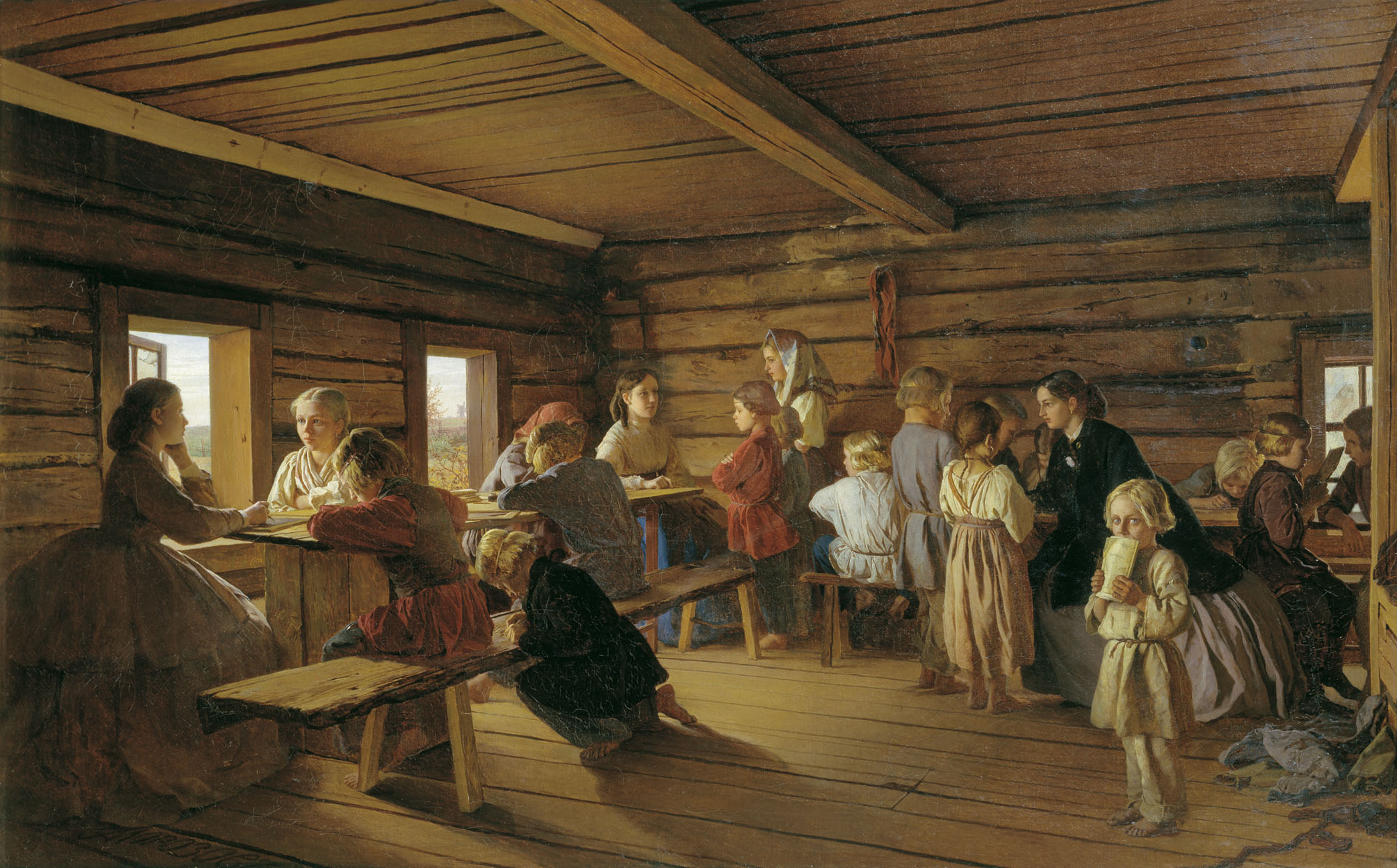
Rural Free School (1865)

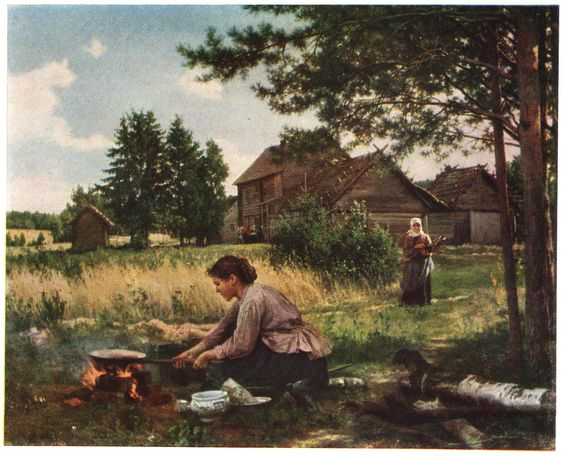
Housewife
(date unknown)
