= Gavril Tanfilyev =

Russian geographer and botanist (1857–1928)

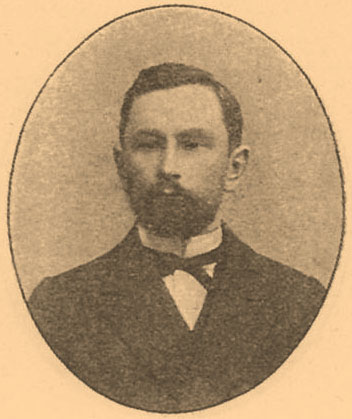

Gavril Ivanovich Tanfilyev (Russian: Гавриил Иванович Танфильев; 6 March 1857 – 14 September 1928) was a Russian and Soviet soil scientist and botanist who worked on biogeography and aspects of plants ecology associated with soil and climate and examined the distributional limits of plants. He also produced a classification of the marshes.

== Biography ==
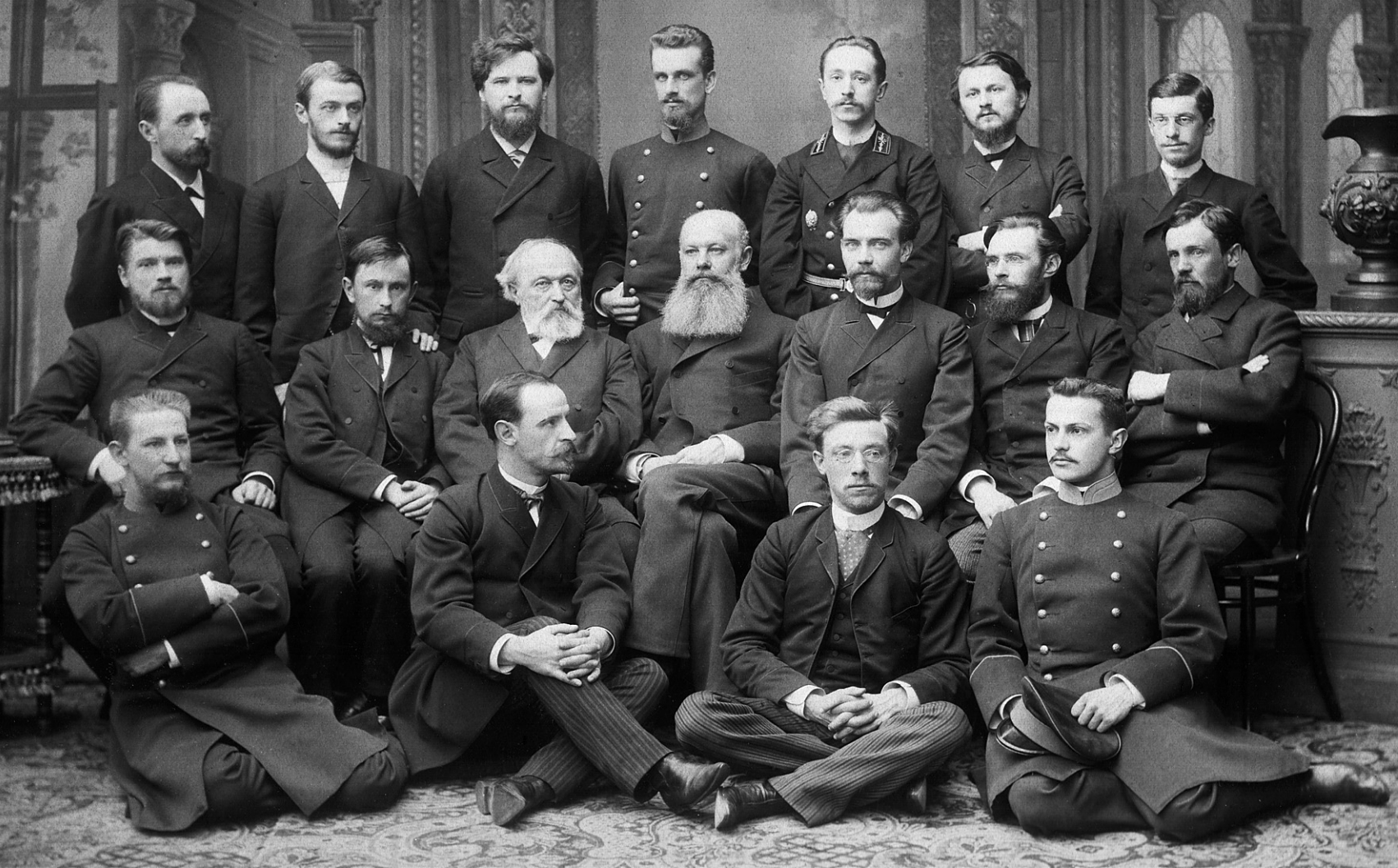
Tanfilyev (middle row, second from left) with Dokuchaiev (middle row, fourth from left), c. 1892.

Tanfilyev was born in Tallinn where his father was a Baltic shipping customs officer. He studied at the Revel Classical Gymnasium before going to the St. Petersburg University in 1877. He graduated in the natural sciences in 1883. His teachers included Andrei Beketov and V. V. Dokuchaiev. His PhD was on the flora of chernozems. In 1892 he went on an expedition with Dokuchaiev into the Russian steppe. He worked for a while at the botanical garden in St. Petersburg before he became a lecturer at St. Petersburg University in 1895 and in 1905 he became a professor at Odessa University. He studied the soil and vegetation in the tundra and steppe region and produced a major work on plant geography in 1916. He noted that the boundary between the forest and the steppe was not defined by climate but by the soil which was non-calcareous outside the steppe. He noted that were salts were leached out by water, and that forests could advance as snow accumulated at the edge of the vegetation and upon melting washed salts out of the soil. In order to examine salinity of soils, he used a standardized technique of adding dilute hydrochloric acid to the soil and boiling it to extract the salts. He proposed the theory that the advance of the forest was geologically recent and that the steppe spread much further north in the past.

Tanfilyev received a Pyotr Semyonov gold medal from the Imperial Russian Geographical Society in 1908.
