= Moroz =

Moroz (Russian: Мороз, Ukrainian: Мороз) is a surname meaning "frost" in Ukrainian and Russian. The surname is particularly common in Ukraine and, to a lesser extent, in Russia. It is a cognate of Maroz (Belarusian), Mróz (Polish), and Mráz (Czech and Slovak). Morozs is the Latvian adaptation of the surname.

== People ==
- Alexander Moroz (1961–2009), Ukrainian chess grandmaster
- Anatoliy Moroz (born 1948), Ukrainian track and field athlete
- Andy Moroz, American trombonist
- Artem Moroz (born 1984), Ukrainian rower
- Daniela Moroz (born 2001), American sailor
- Darya Moroz (born 1983), Russian actress
- Hennadiy Moroz (born 1975), Ukrainian football player
- Irene Moroz, British applied mathematician
- Leonid Moroz, Russian-American neuroscientist
- Maryna Moroz (born 1991), Ukrainian mixed martial artist
- Nataliya Moroz (born 1976), Belarusian biathlete
- Oleksandr Moroz (born 1944), Ukrainian politician
- Olga Moroz (born 1966), Belarusian archer
- Olha Moroz (born 1970), Ukrainian sprinter
- Pavel Moroz (born 1987), Ukrainian-Russian volleyball player
- Pavlo Moroz (born 1974), Ukrainian lawyer
- Regina Moroz (born 1987), Russian volleyball player
- Stanislav Moroz (1938–2013), Soviet and Transnistrian engineer and politician
- Valentyn Moroz (1936–2019), Ukrainian political prisoner
- Vasyl Moroz (born 1942), Ukrainian academic
- Viktor Moroz (born 1968), Ukrainian football player
- Viktors Morozs (born 1980), Latvian football player
- Volodymyr Moroz (1967–2025), Ukrainian businessman and politician
- Yuri Moroz (director) (1956–2025), Soviet and Russian film director, actor, scriptwriter and producer
- Yuriy Moroz (born 1970), Ukrainian football player and coach

== See also ==
- Moroz Records
- Moroz (mythology)
- Morozov (surname), a surname more common in Russia
- Boris Morros, Hollywood film maker, composer, double agent (KGB and FBI)
