= Maroz =

Maroz (Belarusian: Мароз) is a Belarusian surname meaning "frost". Notable people with the surname include:

- Henadz Maroz (born 1978), Belarusian high jumper
- Ivan Maroz (born 1992), Belarusian handball player
- Uladzimir Maroz (born 1985), Belarusian professional footballer

== See also ==
- Moroz, Ukrainian equivalent
- Mráz, Czech and Slovak equivalent
- Mróz, Polish equivalent
