= Yevgeny Morozov =

Yevgeny Morozov may refer to:

- Yevgeny Morozov (footballer) (born 2001), Russian footballer
- Yevgeny Morozov (rower) (1929–2021), Soviet rower
- Evgeny Morozov, Belarusian writer
- Yawhen Marozaw, Belarusian footballer
- Evgeniy Morozov (choirmaster), Soviet and Russian choirmaster
