= Morozovsk =

Town in Rostov Oblast, Russia

Morozovsk Морозовск
- Town
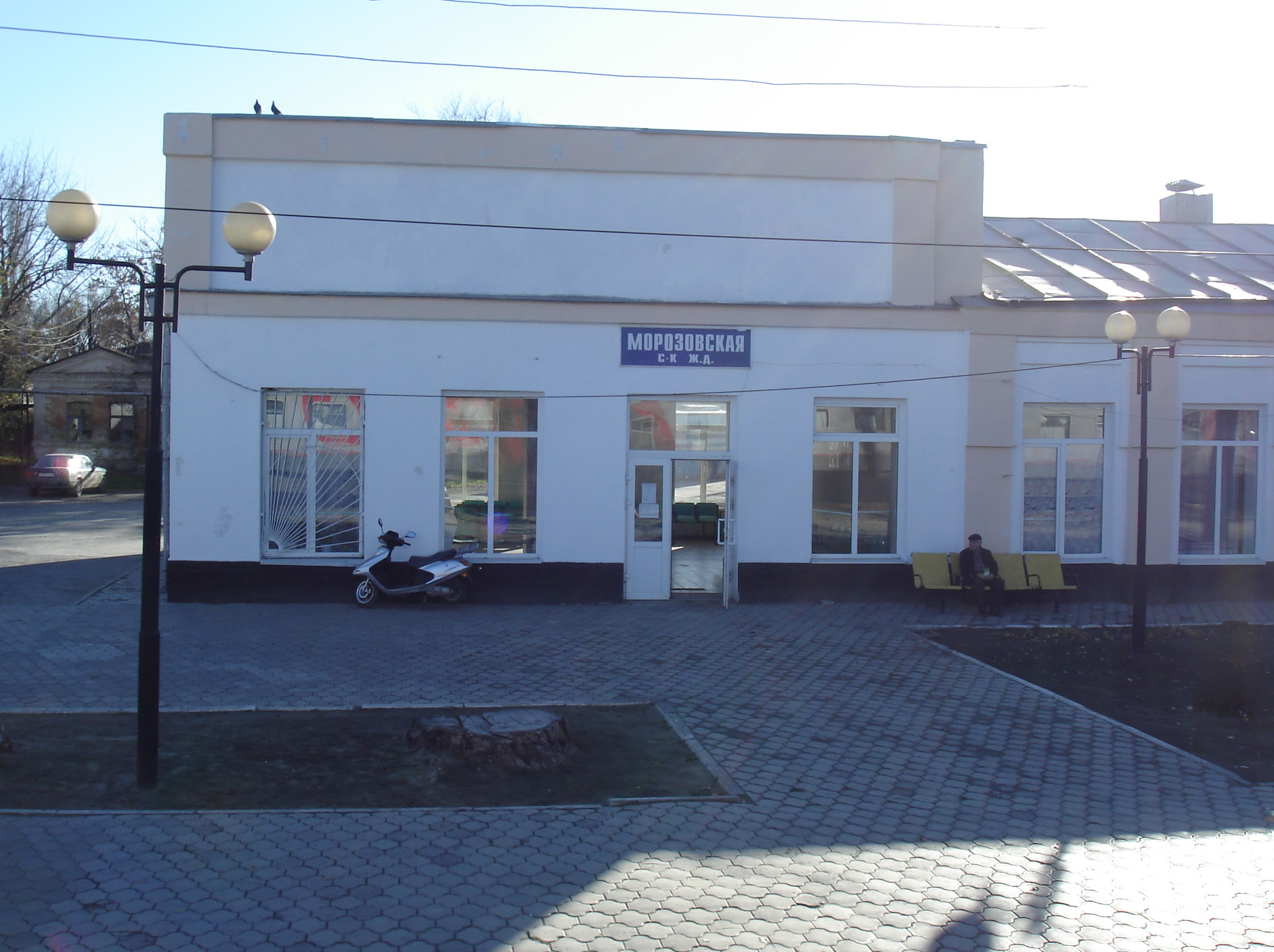
- Morozovskaya railway station in Morozovsk

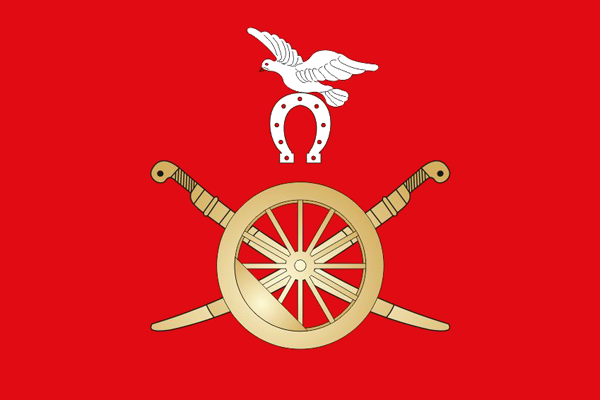
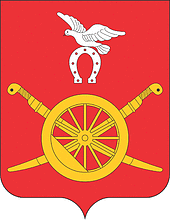
- Flag Coat of arms
- Interactive map of Morozovsk
- Location of Morozovsk Morozovsk (Rostov Oblast)
- Coordinates: 48°22′N 41°50′E
- Country: Russia
- Federal subject: Rostov Oblast
- Administrative district: Morozovsky District
- Urban settlementSelsoviet: Morozovskoye
- Founded: 1910
- Town status since: 1941
- Elevation: 80 m (260 ft)

Population (2010 Census)
  - Total: 27,642
  - Estimate (2021): 24,258 (−12.2%)

Administrative status
  - Capital of: Morozovsky District, Morozovskoye Urban Settlement

Municipal status
  - Municipal district: Morozovsky Municipal District
  - Urban settlement: Morozovskoye Urban Settlement
  - Capital of: Morozovsky Municipal District, Morozovskoye Urban Settlement
- Time zone: UTC+3 (MSK)
- Postal codes: 347210, 347211, 347214, 347219, 347239
- Dialing code: +7 86384
- OKTMO ID: 60634101001

Morozovsk (Russian: Моро́зовск) is a town and the administrative center of Morozovsky District in Rostov Oblast, Russia, located on the Bystraya River (left tributary of the Seversky Donets), 265 kilometers (165 mi) northeast of Rostov-on-Don, the administrative center of the oblast. Population: 27,642 (2010 census); 29,222 (2002 census); 27,004 (1989 Soviet census).

== History ==
Historical affiliations

Russian Empire 1880s–1917
Russian Republic 1917
Soviet Russia 1917–1922
Soviet Union 1922–1991
Russian Federation 1991–present

The khutor of Morozov (Моро́зов) was founded in the 1880s. In 1900, Morozovskaya railway station, named after it, was opened nearby. In 1910, the stanitsa of Taubeyevskaya (Таубе́евская) was established near the railway station. It was renamed Morozovskaya on April 24, 1917. Later, these two rural localities grew and merged, and the resulting settlement was granted town status in 1941.

== Administrative and municipal status ==
Within the framework of administrative divisions, Morozovsk serves as the administrative center of Morozovsky District. As an administrative division, it is incorporated within Morozovsky District as Morozovskoye Urban Settlement. As a municipal division, this administrative unit also has urban settlement status and is a part of Morozovsky Municipal District.

== Military ==
There is an airbase located 3.1 miles (5.0 km) southwest of the town.

== Attractions ==
There are many monuments and museums In Morozovsk.

- Near the train station is a monument to the steam locomotive.
- Morozov Museum was opened in 1994. The Museum building was built in the early twentieth century on the outskirts of the former farm Lyubimov. The facade of the Museum there are four bas-relief. On two bas-reliefs shows a smithy with two blacksmiths, harrowing land, two drawn by oxen, on the other — Cossack on horseback with guns.
- Monument to the fallen soldiers of the Soviet army who died during the great Patriotic war.
- A monument in honor of the Soviet victory over Nazi Germany — the MiG-21.
- The Church Of The Intercession Of The Blessed Virgin Mary. The church was built by the project Fomin, Konstantin Ivanovich in 1914. The church was consecrated on 25 April 1915. The church operated until the mid 1930-ies. Was built next to a military townlet and the church was in its territory. So the temple remained standing until the end of 1940-ies. During the war the temple was destroyed the bell tower. After the war the church was a military warehouse. In 2001 began the restoration of the temple. In the temple are the icon of St. Nikolay Popov with relics, the icon of Matrona of Moscow with a particle of the relics, the icon of the Holy virgin.

== Literature ==
- ФГУП «Южное Аэрогеодезическое Предприятие» Атлас Ростовская область Города, 2007.
- Краснознамённый Киевский. Очерки истории Краснознамённого Киевского военного округа (1919-1979). Издание второе, исправленное и дополненное. Киев, издательство политической литературы Украины, 1979.
- Военный энциклопедический словарь. М., Военное издательство, 1984.
- Справочник «Освобождение городов: Справочник по освобождению городов в период Великой Отечественной войны 1941-1945». М. Л. Дударенко, Ю. Г. Перечнев, В. Т. Елисеев и др. М.: Воениздат, 1985. 598 с.
