= Morozovsky District =

Morozovsky District Морозовский район (Russian)
- District
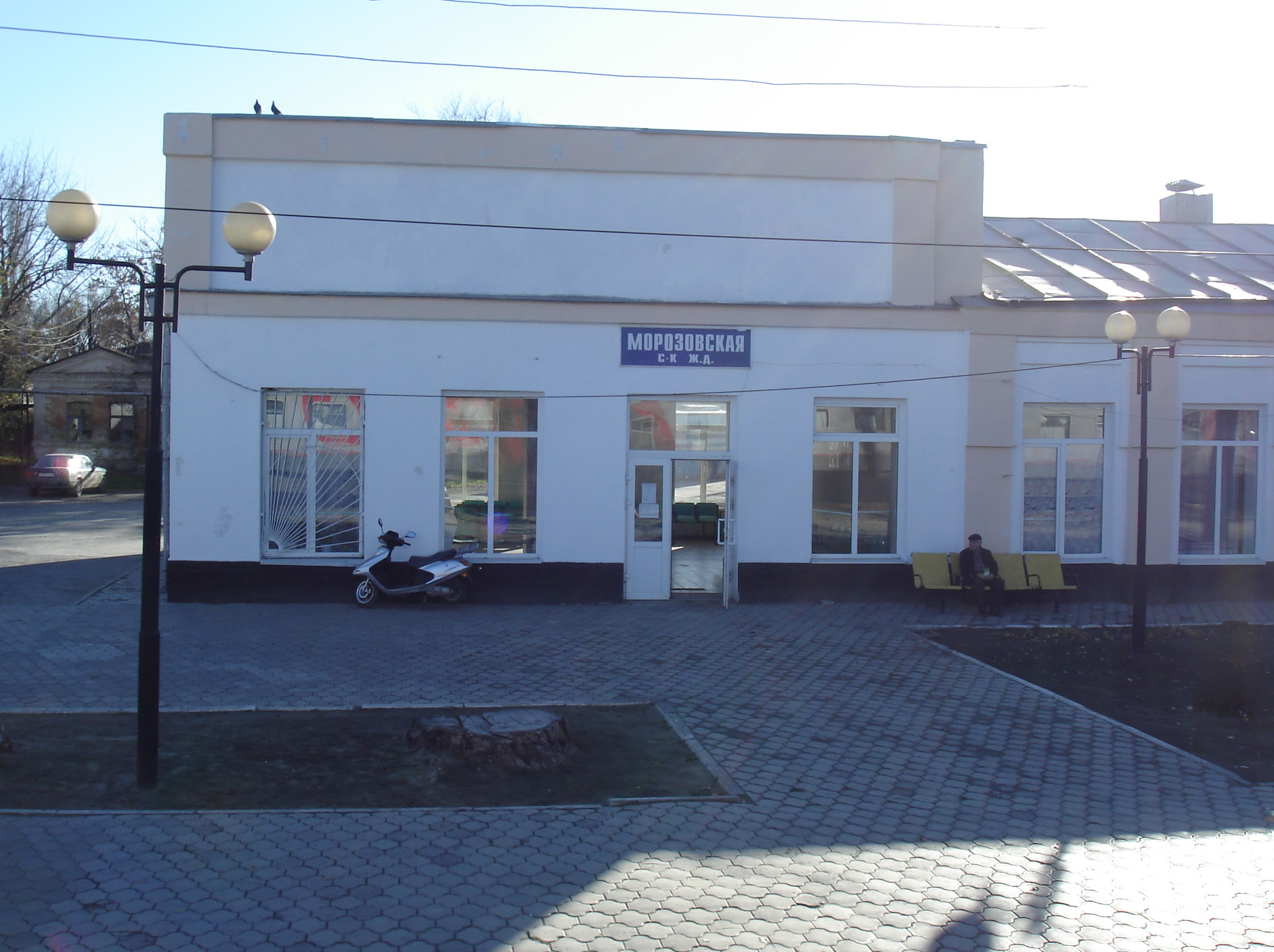
- Train station in Morozovsk, Morozovsky District

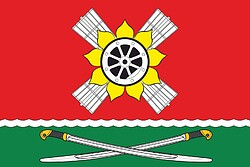
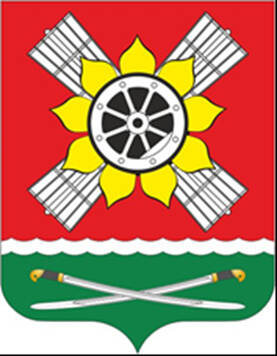
- Flag Coat of arms
- Location of Morozovsky District in Rostov Oblast
- Coordinates: 48°21′N 41°50′E
- Country: Russia
- Federal subject: Rostov Oblast
- Established: 1924
- Administrative center: Morozovsk

Area
  - Total: 2,550 km^{2} (980 sq mi)

Population (2010 Census)
  - Total: 42,404
  - Density: 16.6/km^{2} (43.1/sq mi)
  - Urban: 65.2%
  - Rural: 34.8%

Administrative structure
  - Administrative divisions: 1 Urban settlements, 8 Rural settlements
  - Inhabited localities: 1 cities/towns, 54 rural localities

Municipal structure
  - Municipally incorporated as: Morozovsky Municipal District
  - Municipal divisions: 1 urban settlements, 8 rural settlements
- Time zone: UTC+3 (MSK)
- OKTMO ID: 60634000
- Website: http://www.morozovsky.ru/

Morozovsky District (Russian: Моро́зовский райо́н) is an administrative and municipal district (raion), one of the forty-three in Rostov Oblast, Russia. It is located in the east of the oblast. The area of the district is 2,550 square kilometers (980 sq mi). Its administrative center is the town of Morozovsk. Population: 42,404 (2010 Census); 46,395 (2002 census); 43,574 (1989 Soviet census). The population of Morozovsk accounts for 65.2% of the district's total population.
