= Pavel Marozau =

Pavel Yahoravich Marozau (Belarusian: Павел Ягоравiч Марозаў, born on October 11, 1978, in Minsk) is a Belarusian and Estonian civic activist, media manager and web producer.

== Education and early life ==
Pavel graduated from Belarusian State University of Economics (BSUE) with major in Banking (2000), got a master's degree from BSUE in Finance and Credit (2004), and then obtained master's degree in political science from European Humanities University (2004).

Since 1998 he had been actively involved into volunteering with Belarusian office of Service Civil International (SCI), from 2000 till 2003 he was a member of the Financial Councilors Committee of this organization. After graduation he was working in Priorbank (part of Raiffeisen Holding, Austria), then shifting to IT business and realization of the Fostering Opportunities in Belarusian Green Movement project. In 2004 he founded a branch of local Third Way community.

== Civic involvement and political exile ==
In 2005-2006 Marozau participated in Belarusian presidential election as a member of the opposition candidate's Alyaksandr Kazulin team. Simultaneously, he got under politically motivated persecutions by the Belarusian authorities for producing satirical animated films casting president Lukashenko, being accused of slandering the Belarusian president. Since late 2006 he has been in political emigration in Estonia after Belarusian authorities’ attempt to arrest him in Minsk.

In the same year Marozau established and took charge of the Valgevene Uus Tee civic organization in Tallinn (Estonia), which aims to develop critical thinking skills of young people in the post-Soviet countries and carries out multiple cultural and media projects in the Baltics, Belarus, Ukraine and Russia.

In late 2014 Marozau founded Russian-language web television ARU TV aimed to counteract Kremlin propaganda in Eastern Europe. In addition, he is the organizer of the RUBYCON annual conference for Russian and Belarusian pro-democratic experts and journalists conducted in partnership with the Estonian MFA.

== Expertise ==
Pavel Marozau is a concept author and implementer of more than 50 projects in the fields of civic activism, information, and culture. He has delivered a number of lectures on situation in East Europe at Woodrow Wilson Center, Kennan Institute, European Doctoral College (Strasbourg), European College of Tartu University, German Marshall Fund, the Heritage Foundation (Washington, D.C.), Carnegie Center (Moscow), Congress Center (Geneva), and other organizations. In addition, he is an expert at Atlantic Council's DisinfoPortal.org – website aimed to track the Kremlin's disinformation campaigns abroad.

Marozau is an alumnus of the PACT Leadership Institute (U.S.), Fletcher School (U.S.), and Maastricht University (Germany-Netherlands) programs. He holds MS in Finance and MA in political science.

== Personal life ==
In 2011 Pavel married Olga-Anastasia Marozava.

== Sites ==
- The Third Way -
- ARU TV -
- Facebook -
- Cartoons -
- Narod.Lu -
