= Alexander Moroz =

Ukrainian chess grandmaster (1961–2009)

Personal information
- Born: Олександр Стефанович Мороз; 18 January 1961 Dnipropetrovsk, Ukrainian SSR, Soviet Union
- Died: 17 January 2009 (aged 47) Minsk, Belarus

Chess career
- Country: Ukraine
- Title: Grandmaster (1999)
- Peak rating: 2530 (October 2000)

Alexander Stefanovich Moroz (Note: Transliterated Oleksandr Stefanovych Moroz from Ukrainian) (Ukrainian: Олександр Стефанович Мороз; Russian: Александр Мороз; 18 January 1961 – 17 January 2009) was a Ukrainian chess Grandmaster (1999). He was vice-president of the Ukrainian chess federation, president of the chess federation of the Dnipropetrovsk Oblast and chairman of the youth committee of the Ukrainian chess federation as well as International Arbiter.

His best single performance was at Momotov mem Yenakiieve, 1997, where he scored 8.5 of 13 points. Other successful results include equal 1st with Ashot Nadanian at Częstochowa Open 1992, 2nd behind Sergei Movsesian at Pardubice 1995, 1st at Marhanets 1999, and 3rd at Alushta Summer 2006.

== Notable games ==
- Alexander Moroz vs Evgeny Vladimirov, URS-ch otbor56 1988, Spanish Game: Bird Variation (C61), 1-0
- Vitaly Tseshkovsky vs Alexander Moroz, URS-chT 1990, Spanish Game: Morphy Defense. Chigorin Defense (C99), 0-1
- Ratmir Kholmov vs Alexander Moroz, Decin op-A 1998, Sicilian Defense: Old Sicilian (B22), 0-1
- Alexander Moroz vs Athanasios Mastrovasilis, Antalya TUR 2001, Spanish Game: Exchange. Keres Variation (C68), 1-0
