= Russian Academy of Arts =

Russian state scientific institution

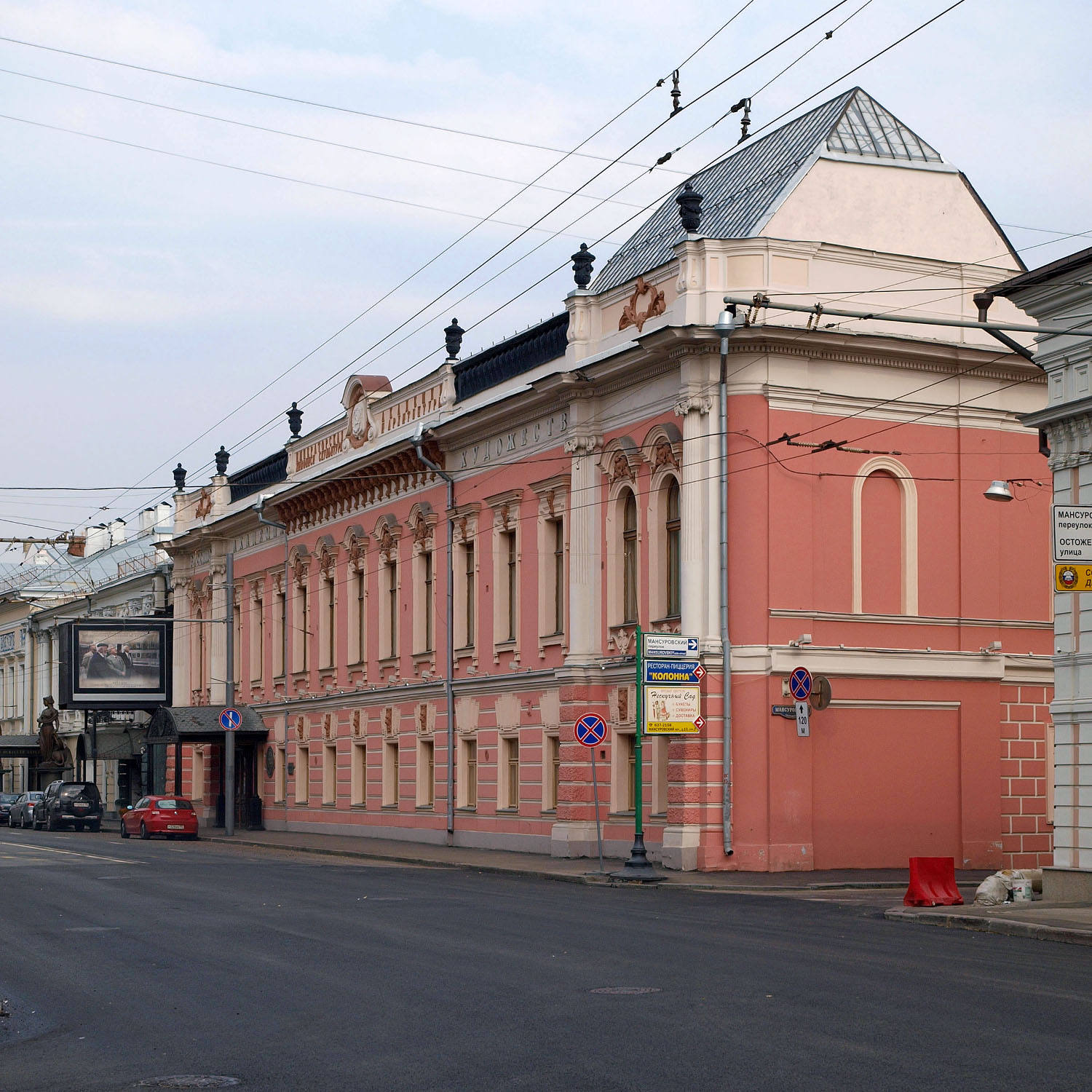
- Building of Presidium of the Arts Academy (former I. A. Morozov's mansion)
- Other name: RAKh (rus. Российская Академия Художеств)
- Established: 1757
- President: Vacant
- Address: 119034, Prechistenka st. 21, Moscow, Russian Federation
- Location: Khamovniki, Moscow, Moscow, Russia
- Coordinates: 55°44′29.3″N 37°35′34.6″E
- Interactive map of Russian Academy of Arts
- Website: https://rah.ru

Russian Academy of Arts (RAA / rus. РАХ, Росси́йская акаде́мия худо́жеств) is the State scientific Institution of Russian Federation, eligible heir to the USSR Academy of Arts. A founder of RAA is the Government of the Russian Federation.

== Academic system of art education ==
Art education is one of the main aspects of the Russian Academy of Arts activity.

== Membership ==
Members of the Russian Academy of Arts include Full Members, Corresponding Members, Honorary Members and Foreign Members.

The Government of Russia determines the number of members and the Academy Assembly has the right to elect them.

Elections should be held at least once in 3 years.
