= Sergey Prokudin-Gorsky =

Russian chemist and photographer (1863–1944)

- Сергей Прокудин-Горский
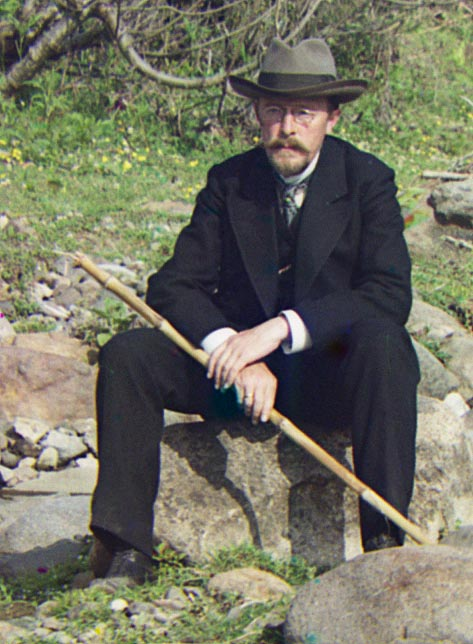
- Prokudin-Gorskii "on the Karolitskhali River" in 1912
- Born: 30 August [O.S. 18 August] 1863; Funikova Gora, Pokrovsky Uyezd, Vladimir Governorate, Russian Empire
- Died: 27 September 1944 (aged 81); Paris, France
- Resting place: Sainte-Geneviève-des-Bois Russian Cemetery
- Occupations: Chemist; photographer
- Known for: Early techniques for taking colour photographs

Sergey Mikhaylovich Prokudin-Gorsky (Russian: Сергей Михайлович Прокудин-Горский, IPA: [sʲɪrˈɡʲej mʲɪˈxajləvʲɪtɕ prɐˈkudʲɪn ˈɡorskʲɪj]; 30 August [O.S. 18 August] 1863 – 27 September 1944) was a Russian chemist and photographer. He is best known for his pioneering work in colour photography and his effort to document the early 20th-century Russian Empire.

Using a railway-car darkroom provided by Emperor Nicholas II, Prokudin-Gorsky travelled the Russian Empire from around 1909 to 1915 using his three-image colour photography to record its many aspects. While some of his negatives were lost, the majority ended up in the US Library of Congress after his death. Starting in 2000, the negatives were digitised and the colour triples for each subject digitally combined to produce hundreds of high-quality colour images of Russia and its neighbours from over a century ago.

== Biography ==
=== Early life ===
Sergey Mikhaylovich Prokudin-Gorsky was born in the ancestral estate of Funikova Gora, in the Pokrovsky Uyezd of the Vladimir Governorate (now Kirzhachsky District, Vladimir Oblast). His parents were of the Russian nobility, and the family had a long military history. They moved to Saint Petersburg, where Prokudin-Gorsky enrolled in Saint Petersburg State Institute of Technology to study chemistry under Dmitri Mendeleev. He also studied music and painting at the Imperial Academy of Arts.

=== Marriage and career in photography ===
In 1890, Prokudin-Gorsky married Anna Aleksandrovna Lavrova, and later the couple had two sons, Mikhail and Dmitri, and a daughter, Ekaterina. Anna was the daughter of the Russian industrialist Aleksandr Stepanovich Lavrov, an active member in the Imperial Russian Technical Society (IRTS). Prokudin-Gorsky subsequently became the director of the executive board of Lavrov's metal works near Saint Petersburg and remained so until the October Revolution. He also joined Russia's oldest photographic society, the photography section of the IRTS, presenting papers and lecturing on the science of photography.

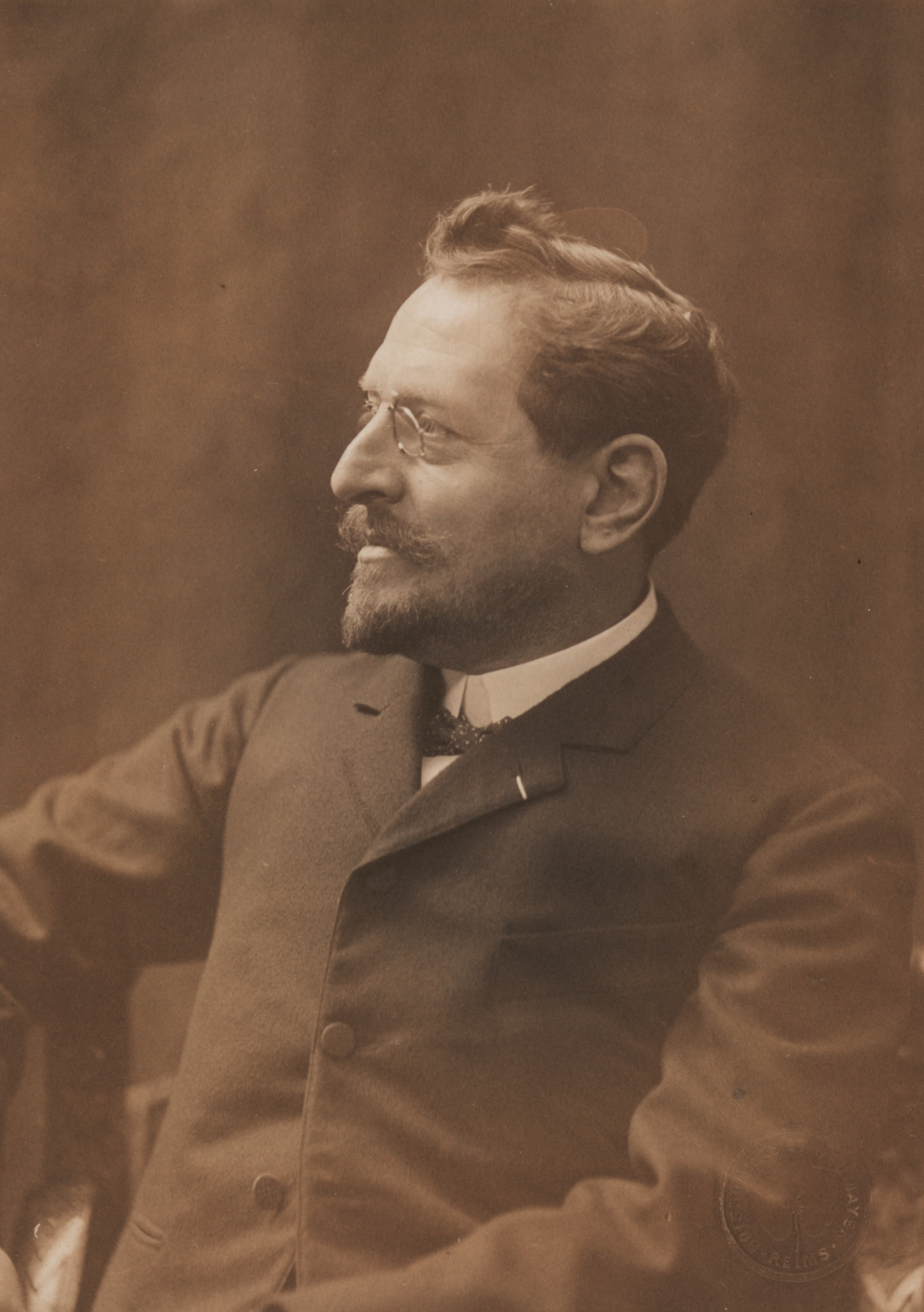
Prokudin-Gorsky in 1906

In 1901, Prokudin-Gorsky established a photographic studio and laboratory in Saint Petersburg. The following year, he travelled to Berlin and spent 6 weeks studying colour sensitization and three-colour photography with photochemistry professor Adolf Miethe, the most advanced practitioner in Germany at that time. Throughout the years, Prokudin-Gorsky's photographic work, publications and slide shows to other scientists and photographers in Russia, Germany and France earned him praise, and in 1906 he was elected the president of the IRTS photography section and editor of Russia's main photography journal, the Fotograf-Liubitel. Gorsky was a member of the Royal Photographic Society between 1920 and 1932.

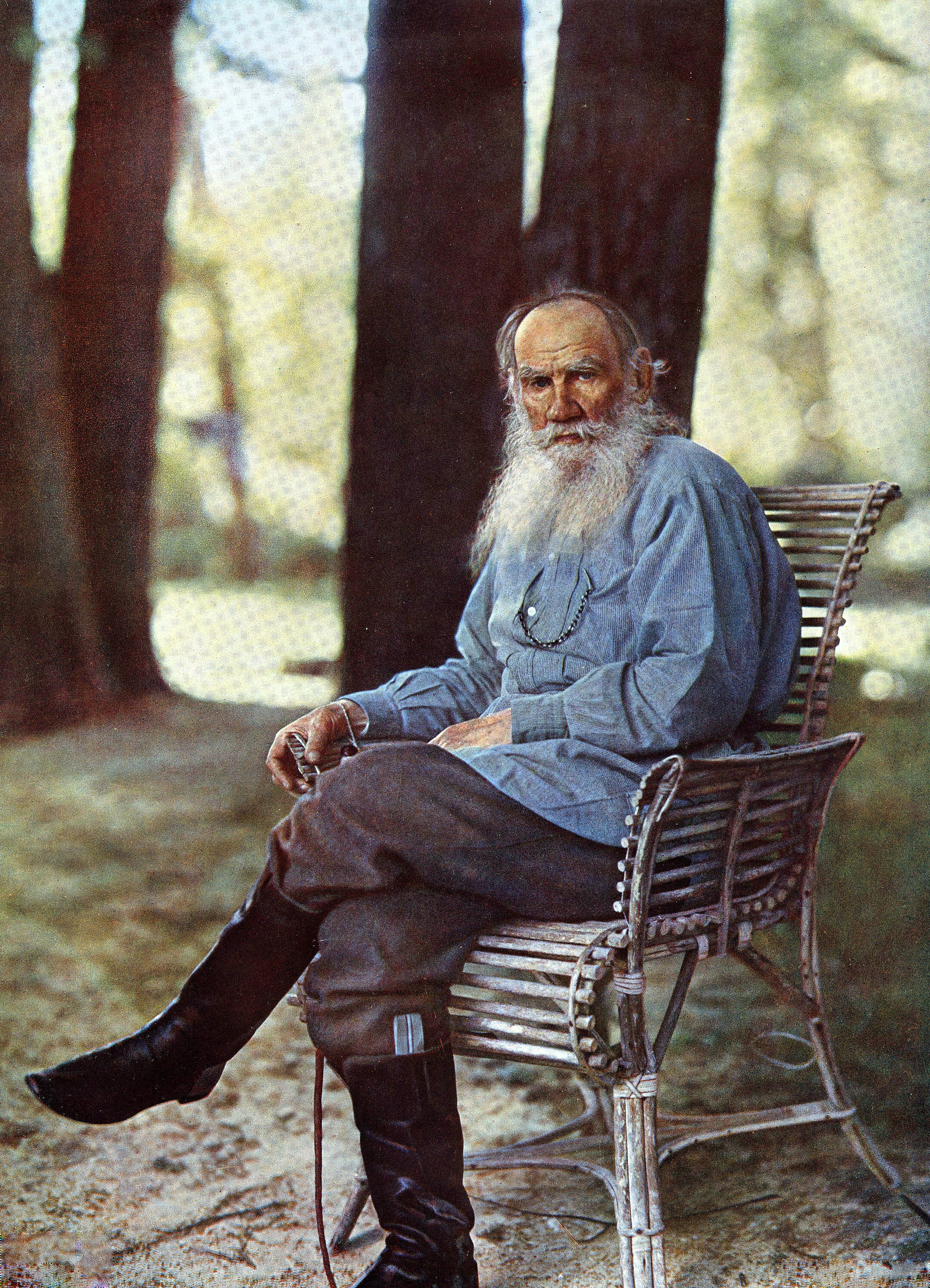
Lithograph print of Leo Tolstoy in front of Prokudin-Gorsky's camera in Yasnaya Polyana, 1908

Perhaps Prokudin-Gorsky's best-known work during his lifetime was his color portrait of Leo Tolstoy, which was reproduced in various publications, on postcards, and as larger prints for framing. The fame from this photo and his earlier photos of Russia's nature and monuments earned him invitations to show his work to the Russian Grand Duke Michael Alexandrovich and Dowager Empress Maria Feodorovna in 1908, and to Tsar Nicholas II and his family in 1909. The Tsar enjoyed the demonstration, and, with his blessing, Prokudin-Gorsky got the permission and funding to document Russia in color. In the course of ten years, he was to make a collection of 10,000 photos. Prokudin-Gorsky considered the project his life's work and continued his photographic journeys through Russia until after the October Revolution. Under the new regime he was forced to accept a professorship and in August 1918 was ordered by the Education Ministry to procure projection equipment in Norway. He still pursued scientific work in color photography, published papers in English photography journals and, together with his colleague S. O. Maksimovich, obtained patents in Germany, England, France and Italy.

=== Later life and death ===
In 1920, Prokudin-Gorsky remarried and had a daughter with his assistant Maria Fedorovna née Schedrina. The family finally settled in Paris in 1922, reuniting with his first wife and children. Prokudin-Gorsky set up a photo studio there together with his three adult children, naming it after his fourth child, Elka. In the 1930s, the elderly Prokudin-Gorsky continued with lectures showing his photographs of Russia to young Russians in France, but stopped commercial work and left the studio to his children, who named it Gorsky Frères. He died in Paris on 27 September 1944, a month after the Liberation of Paris. He is buried in the Sainte-Geneviève-des-Bois Russian Cemetery.

== Photography technique ==
=== Three-color principle ===
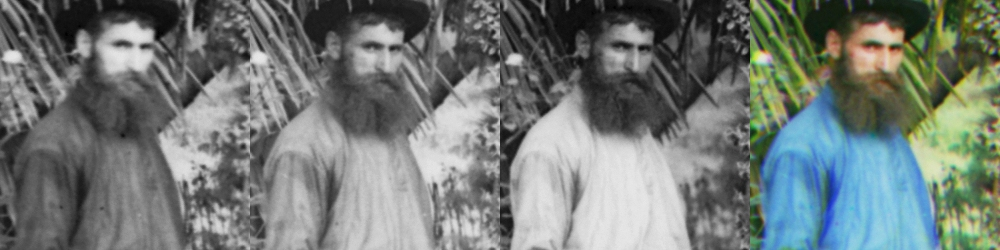
Crop from Alleia Hamerops showing the red, green and blue color channels as well as the composite image

The method of color photography used by Prokudin-Gorsky was first suggested by James Clerk Maxwell in 1855 and demonstrated in 1861, but good results were not possible with the photographic materials available at that time. In imitation of the way a normal human eye senses color, the visible spectrum of colors was divided into three channels of information by capturing it in the form of three black-and-white photographs, one taken through a red filter, one through a green filter, and one through a blue filter. The resulting three photographs could be projected through filters of the same colors and exactly superimposed on a screen, synthesizing the original range of color additively; or viewed as an additive color image by one person at a time through an optical device known generically as a chromoscope or photochromoscope, which contained colored filters and transparent reflectors that visually combined the three into one full-color image; or used to make photographic or mechanical prints in the complementary colors cyan, magenta and yellow, which, when superimposed, reconstituted the color subtractively.

=== Early practitioners ===
Louis Ducos du Hauron conducted early experiments with the three-color principle in the late 1860s. During the period from the 1870s to the 1890s, he created several color prints and photographs.

In 1877, Edward Bierstadt showcased the first successful three-color prints in the United States. His work gained attention in the 1890s when he exhibited color prints of various subjects such as oil and watercolor paintings, floral studies, and portraits from life.

The first person to widely demonstrate good results by this method was Frederic E. Ives, whose "Kromskop" system of viewers, projectors and camera equipment was commercially available from 1897 until about 1907. Only the viewers and ready-made triple photographs for use in them sold in any significant quantity. Still life arrangements, unpopulated landscapes and oil paintings were the typical subject matter, but a few examples of color portraiture from life were also offered.

Another very notable practitioner was Adolf Miethe, with whom Prokudin-Gorsky studied in Germany in 1902. Miethe was a photochemist who greatly improved the panchromatic characteristics of the black-and-white photographic materials suitable for use with this method of color photography. He presented projected color photographs to the German Imperial Family in 1902 and was exhibiting them to the general public in 1903, when they also began to appear in periodicals and books. Miethe took the first known aerial color photographs, from a hot air balloon, in 1906.

In England in 1899 Ives's former assistant, Edward Sanger-Shepherd, commercialized the application of the three-colour process in the "Sanger Shepherd process of natural colour photography". With his process in 1903 and 1904 Sarah Angelina Acland produced the first substantial body of work in colour photography by an amateur photographer. By 1905 seventeen different photographers had shown three-colour slides by the Sanger-Shepherd process at exhibitions of the Royal Photographic Society in England.

In 1905, the Neue Photographische Gesellschaft established a color photography studio in Berlin. The studio utilized the three-color principle and employed a printing process developed by Robert Krayn. Some of the resulting images were published as postcards, featuring notable individuals including Kaiser Wilhelm II and Pope Pius X.

=== Equipment ===
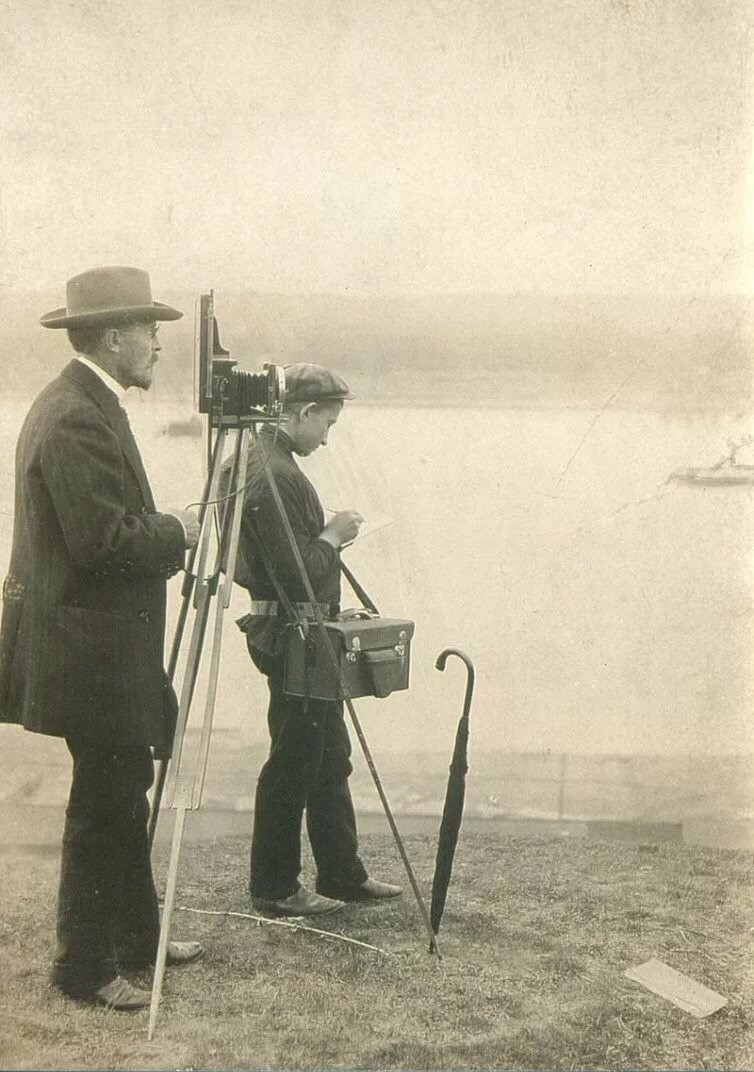
Prokudin-Gorsky with his colour camera and an assistant

Photographic plates, which had the light-sensitive emulsion coated on a thin sheet of glass, were normally used instead of flexible film, both because a general transition from glass plates to plastic film was still in progress and because glass provided the best dimensional stability for three images intended to match up perfectly when they were later combined.

An ordinary camera could be used to take the three pictures, by reloading it and changing filters between exposures, but pioneering color photographers usually built or bought special cameras that made the procedure less awkward and time-consuming. One of the two main types used beam splitters to produce three separate images in the camera, making all three exposures at the same time and from the same viewpoint. Although a camera of this type was ideal in theory, such cameras were optically complicated and delicate, and liable to get out of adjustment. Some designs were also subject to optical phenomena that could cause noticeably uneven color or other defects in the results. The other, more robust type was an essentially ordinary camera with a special sliding holder for the plates and filters that allowed each in turn to be efficiently shifted into position for exposure—an operation sometimes partly or even entirely automated with a pneumatic mechanism or spring-powered motor.

When the three color-filtered photographs were not taken at the same time, anything in the scene that did not hold steady during the entire operation would exhibit colored "fringes" around its edges in the resulting color image. If it moved continuously across the scene, three separate strongly-colored "ghost" images could result. Such color artifacts are plainly visible in ordinary color composites of many of Prokudin-Gorsky's photographs, but special digital image processing software was used to artificially remove them, whenever possible, from the composites of all 1,902 of the images commissioned by the Library of Congress in 2004. The altered versions have proliferated online and older or third-party versions showing these tell-tale peculiarities are increasingly scarce.

Adolf Miethe designed a high-quality, sequential-exposure color camera, which was manufactured by Bermpohl and became available commercially in 1903. Prokudin-Gorsky published an illustration of it in Fotograf-Liubitel in 1906. The most common model used a single oblong plate 9 cm wide by 24 cm high, the same format as Prokudin-Gorsky's surviving negatives, and it photographed the images in unconventional blue-green-red sequence, which is also a characteristic of Prokudin-Gorsky's negatives if the usual upside-down image in a camera and gravity-compliant downward shiftings of his plates are assumed. An inventor as well as a photographer, Prokudin-Gorsky patented an optical system for cameras of the simultaneous-exposure type, and it is often claimed or implied that he invented, or at least built, the camera used for his Russian Empire project. No definite written or photographic documentation of his field equipment is known to exist, only the evidence inherent in the photographs themselves, and no rationale has been suggested for going to the trouble and expense of building a functionally identical copy of a Miethe-Bermpohl camera instead of simply buying one.

Miethe and Bermpohl also produced a matching three-color projector and a chromoscope. The Goerz optical company made a differently configured and more powerful three-color projector for Miethe. It, too, was commercially available.

=== Exposures ===
The required exposure time depended on the lighting conditions, the sensitivity of the photographic plate, and the camera lens aperture used. In a letter to Leo Tolstoy requesting a portrait sitting, Prokudin-Gorsky described the exposure as taking one to three seconds, but later, when recollecting his time with Tolstoy, he described a six-second exposure on a sunny day. Blaise Agüera y Arcas studied one landscape view, photographed in broad daylight but showing a clear, well-defined moon, and used the moon's movement to estimate that the whole procedure of three filtered exposures and two repositionings of the camera's plate holder had taken over a minute. The lens aperture Prokudin-Gorsky chose to use greatly affected the exposure time required. A small aperture is often used for landscape photography because it allows objects at various distances to all be sharply imaged at the same time, while the use of a large aperture is common for portraiture and plainly evident in the Tolstoy portrait. All other factors being equal, if for example a 16-second exposure was required when using a 1/4-inch-diameter aperture, an exposure of only 1 second would suffice with a 1-inch aperture.

=== Other processes ===
Prokudin-Gorsky was also acquainted with the use of Autochrome color plates, which did not require a special camera or projector. He was one of the favored few the Lumière Brothers introduced to their new product in 1906, the year before it went into commercial production. Autochrome plates were expensive and not sensitive enough for casual "snapshots" with a hand-held camera, but their use was simple and in expert hands they were capable of producing excellent results. They made color photography truly practical for advanced amateurs and led some pioneering users of color separation cameras to abandon their methods as outmoded, but Prokudin-Gorsky was not won over. No Autochromes by Prokudin-Gorsky are known to survive.

Although photographic color prints of the images were difficult to make at the time and slide show lectures consumed much of the time Prokudin-Gorsky used to demonstrate his work, photomechanical color prints of some were published in journals and books, and his studio issued some, most notably the Tolstoy portrait, as postcards and large photogravures. Many of the original prints published by his studio still survive.

Prokudin-Gorsky's own inventions, some of them collaborative, led to the granting of numerous patents, most issued during the years of his voluntary exile and not directly related to the body of work on which his fame now rests. Some concern processes for making subtractive color transparencies, which do not require any special projection or viewing equipment. Examples of these were preserved by Prokudin-Gorsky's family and have recently appeared online. Most of his patents relate to the production of natural-color motion pictures, a potentially lucrative application that attracted the attention of many inventors in the field of color photography during the 1910s and 1920s.

== Documentary of the Russian Empire ==
Around 1905, Prokudin-Gorsky envisioned and formulated a plan to use the emerging technological advances that had been made in color photography to document the Russian Empire systematically. Through such an ambitious project, his ultimate goal was to educate the schoolchildren of Russia with his "optical color projections" of the vast and diverse history, culture, and modernization of the empire.

Outfitted with a specially equipped railroad-car darkroom provided by Tsar Nicholas II and in possession of two permits that granted him access to restricted areas and cooperation from the empire's bureaucracy, Prokudin-Gorsky documented the Russian Empire between around 1909 and 1915. He conducted many illustrated lectures of his work. His photographs offer a vivid portrait of a lost world—the Russian Empire on the eve of World War I and the coming Russian Civil War. His subjects ranged from the medieval churches and monasteries of old Russia, to the railroads and factories of an emerging industrial power, to the daily life and work of Russia's diverse population.

It has been estimated from Prokudin-Gorsky's personal inventory that before leaving Russia, he had about 3,500 negatives. Upon leaving the country and exporting all his photographic material, about half of the photos were confiscated by Russian authorities for containing material they deemed strategically sensitive for war-time Russia. According to Prokudin-Gorsky's notes, the photos left behind were not of interest to the general public. Some of Prokudin-Gorsky's negatives were given away, and some he hid on his departure. Outside the Library of Congress collection, none has yet been found.

By the time of Prokudin-Gorsky's death, the Tsar and his family had long since been executed during the Russian civil war, and most of the former empire was now the Soviet Union. The surviving boxes of photo albums and fragile glass plates the negatives were recorded on were finally stored in the basement of a Parisian apartment building, and the family was worried about them getting damaged. The United States Library of Congress purchased the material from Prokudin-Gorsky's heirs in 1948 for $3,500–$5,000 on the initiative of a researcher inquiring into their whereabouts. The library counted 1,902 negatives and 710 album prints without corresponding negatives in the collection.

== Digital color rendering ==
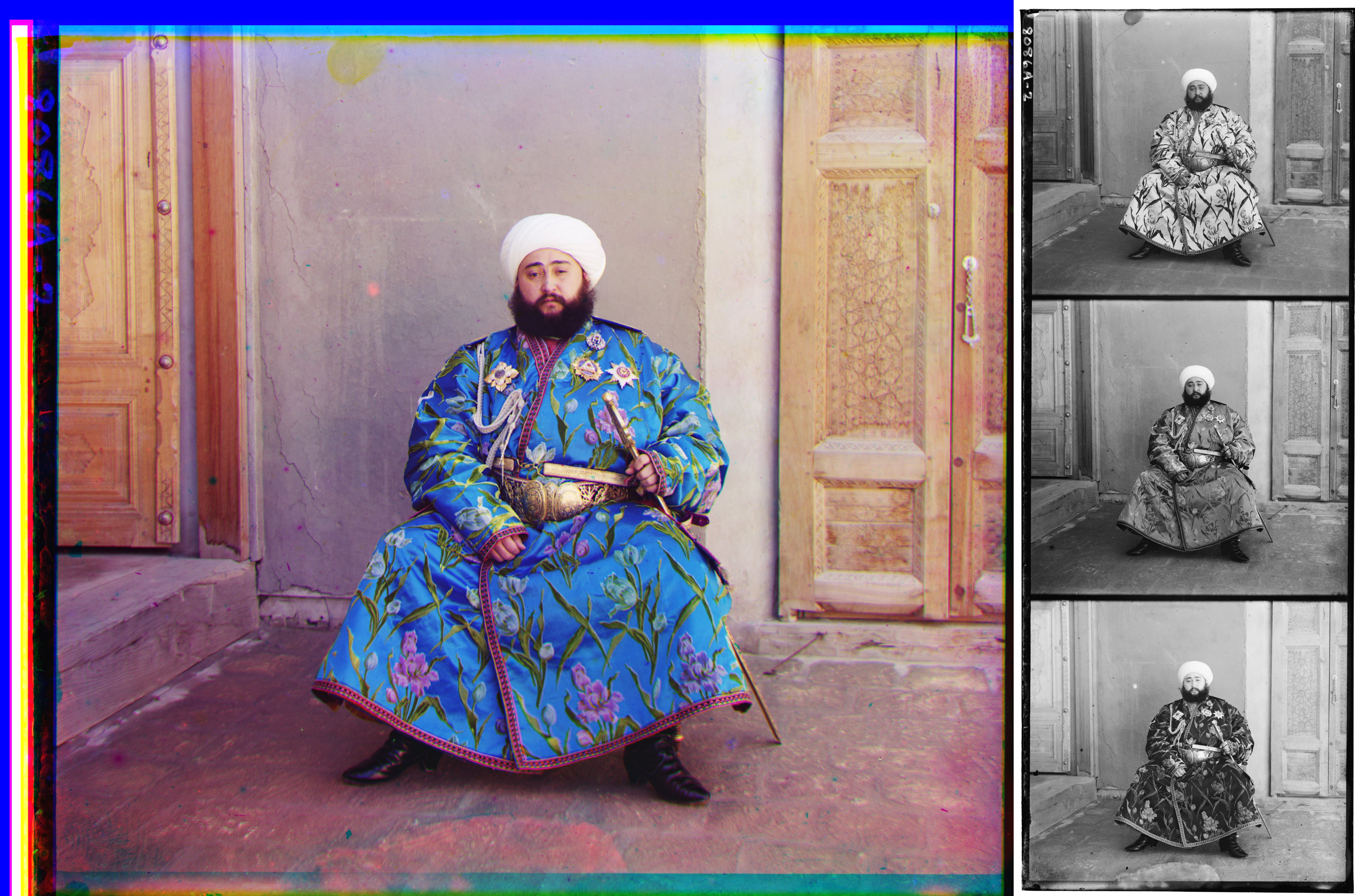
Simple, unretouched color composite of Alim Khan, last Emir of Bukhara, 1911. At right, the original triple negative on glass, shown here in positive form. Prokudin-Gorsky photographed the upper, middle and lower images through blue, green and red filters.

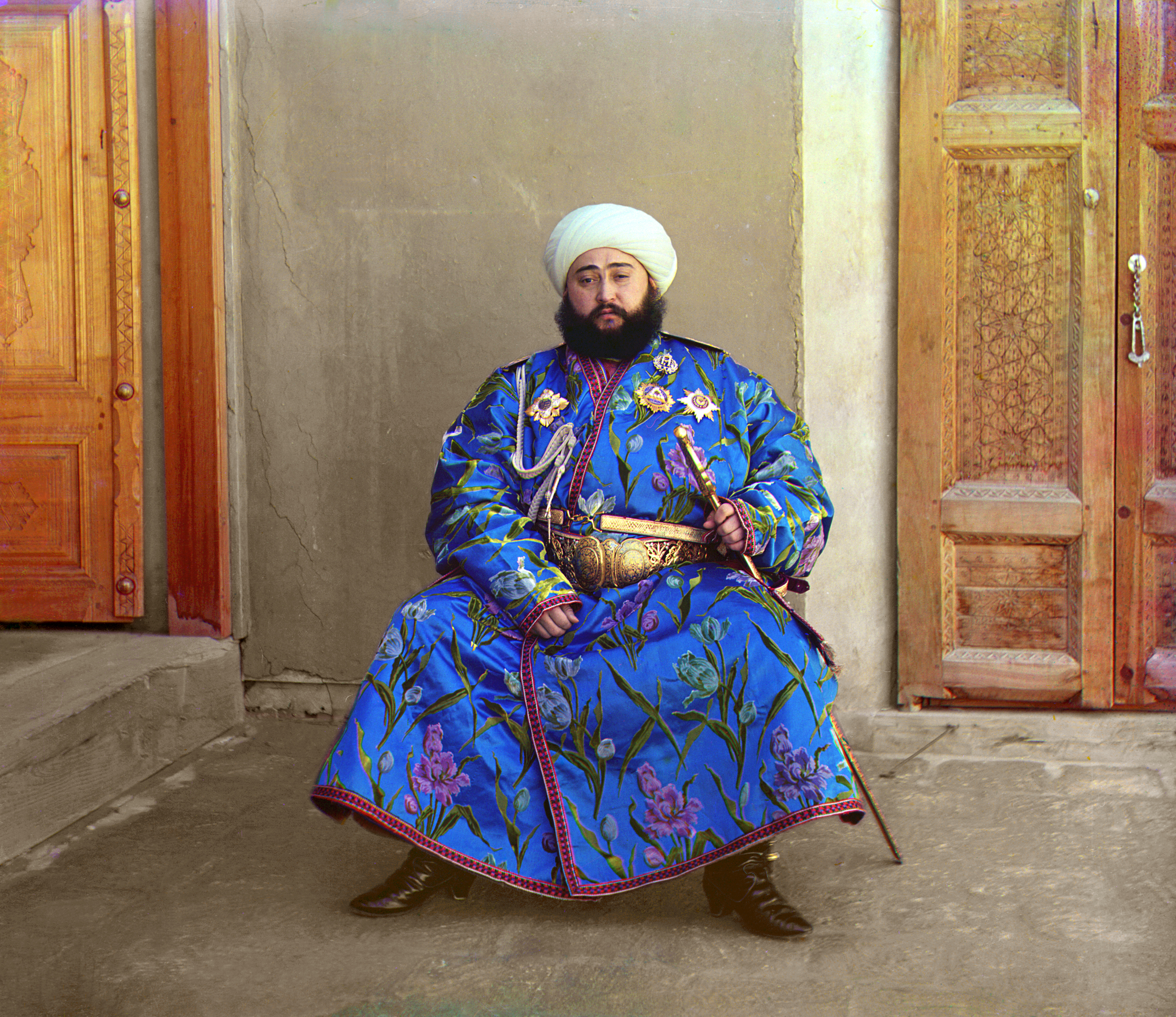
Walter Frankhauser's 2000 "digichromatography" remaster

Due to the very specialized and labor-intensive processes required to make photographic color prints from the negatives, only about a hundred of the images were used in exhibits, books and scholarly articles during the half-century after the Library of Congress acquired them. Their widest exposure was in the 1980 coffee table book Photographs for the Tsar: The Pioneering Color Photography of Sergei Mikhailovich Prokudin-Gorskii Commissioned by Tsar Nicholas II, in which the color images are combined yellow, magenta and cyan ink-on-paper halftones mass-produced with a multicolor printing press in the usual way.

It was only with the advent of digital image processing that multiple images could be quickly and easily combined into one. The Library of Congress undertook a project in 2000 to make digital scans of all the photographic material received from Prokudin-Gorsky's heirs and contracted with the photographer Walter Frankhauser to combine the monochrome negatives into color images. He created 122 color renderings using a method he called digichromatography and commented that each image took him around six to seven hours to align, clean and color-correct. In 2001, the Library of Congress produced an exhibition from these, The Empire That Was Russia: The Prokudin-Gorskii Photographic Record Recreated. The photographs have since been the subject of many other exhibitions in the area where Prokudin-Gorsky took his photos.

In 2004, the Library of Congress contracted with computer scientist Blaise Agüera y Arcas to produce an automated color composite of each of the 1,902 negatives from the high-resolution digital images of the glass-plate negatives. He applied algorithms to compensate for the differences between the exposures and prepared color composites of all the negatives in the collection. As the library offers the high-resolution images of the negatives freely on the Internet, many others have since created their own color representations of the photos, and they have become a favorite testbed for computer scientists.

== Gallery ==
Some of Sergey Prokudin-Gorsky's photographs, digitally remastered, made available by the Library of Congress:

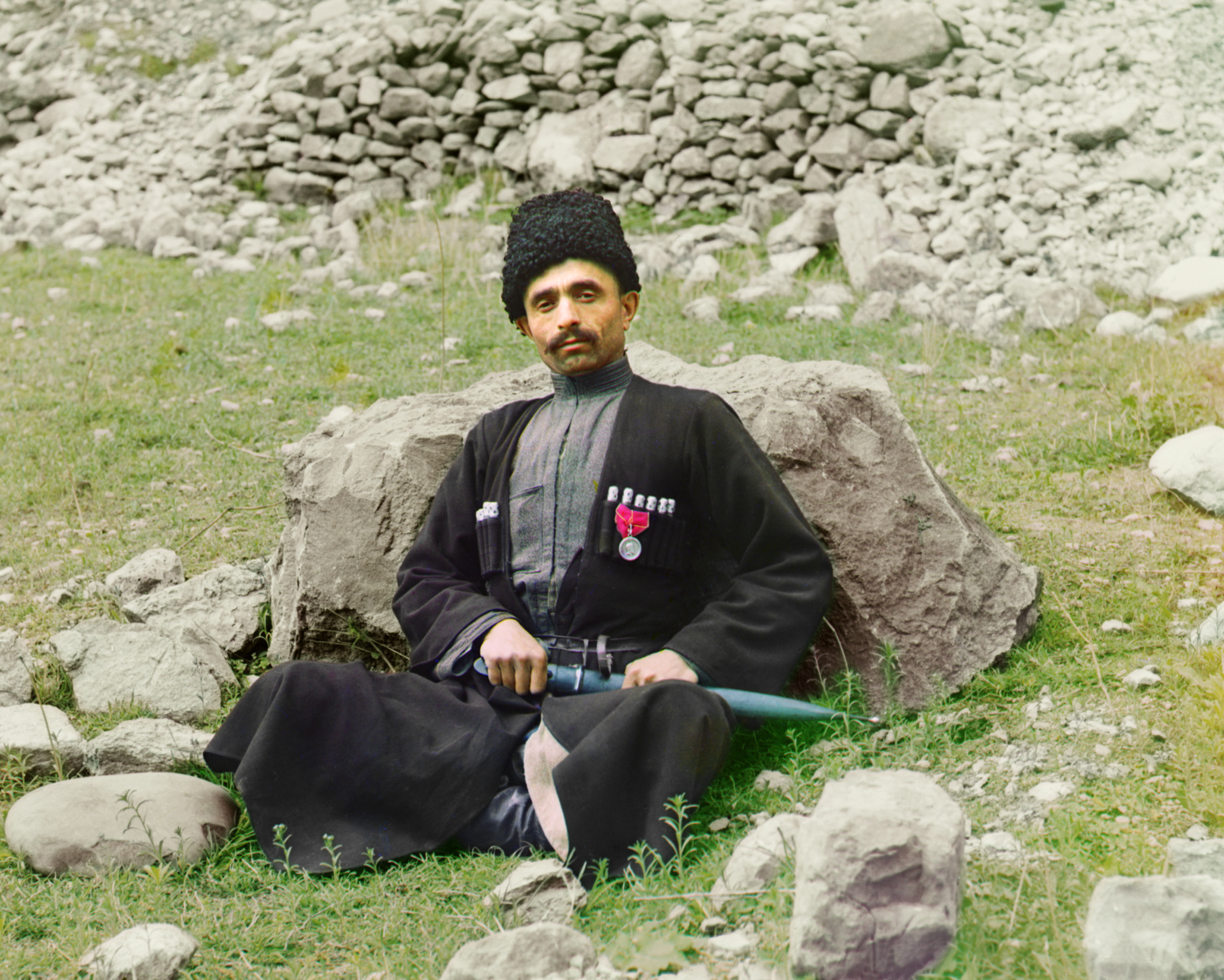
Dagestani Sunni Muslim, 1904

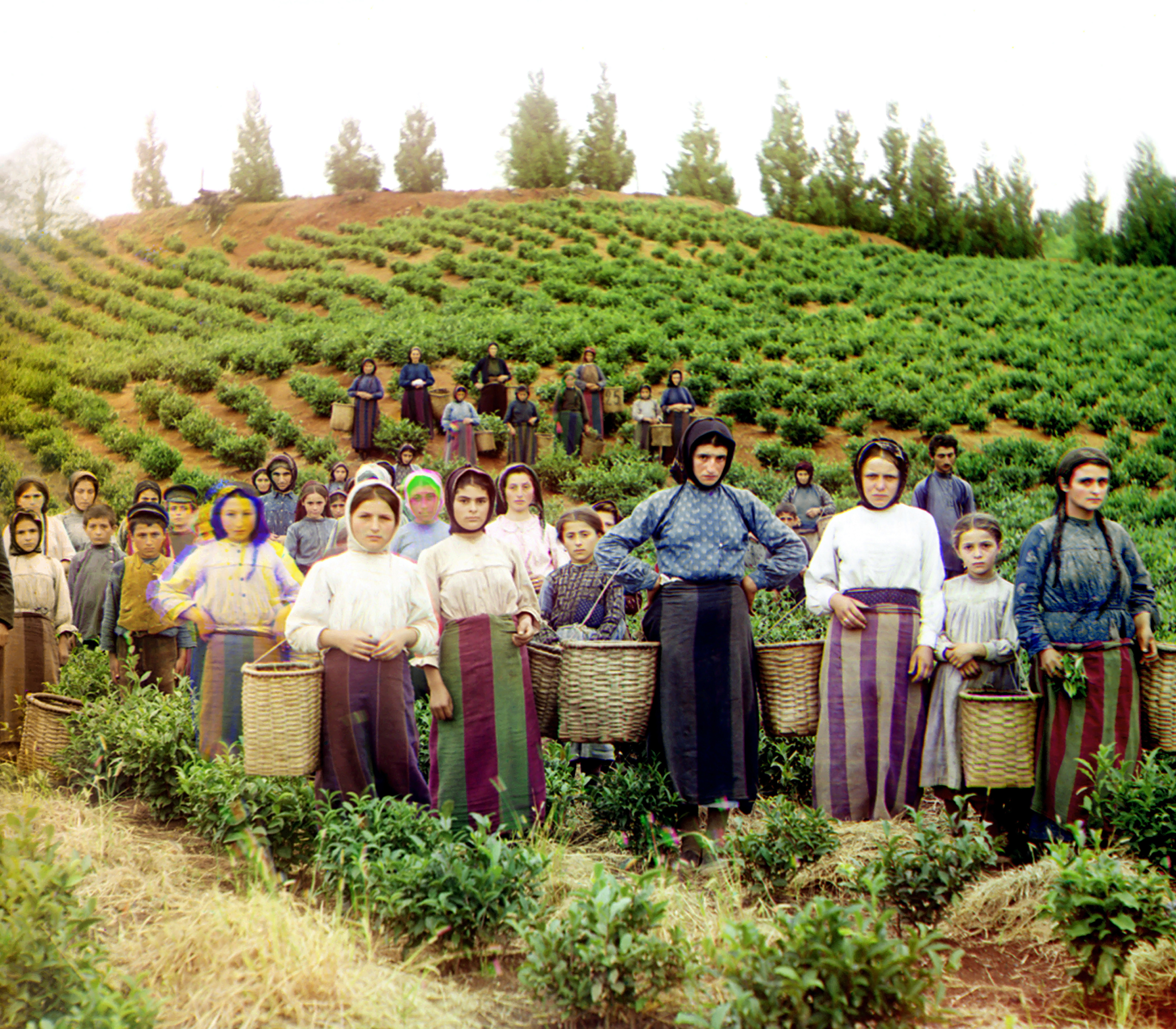
Greek women and children harvesting tea in Chakvi, Georgia, circa 1905–1915

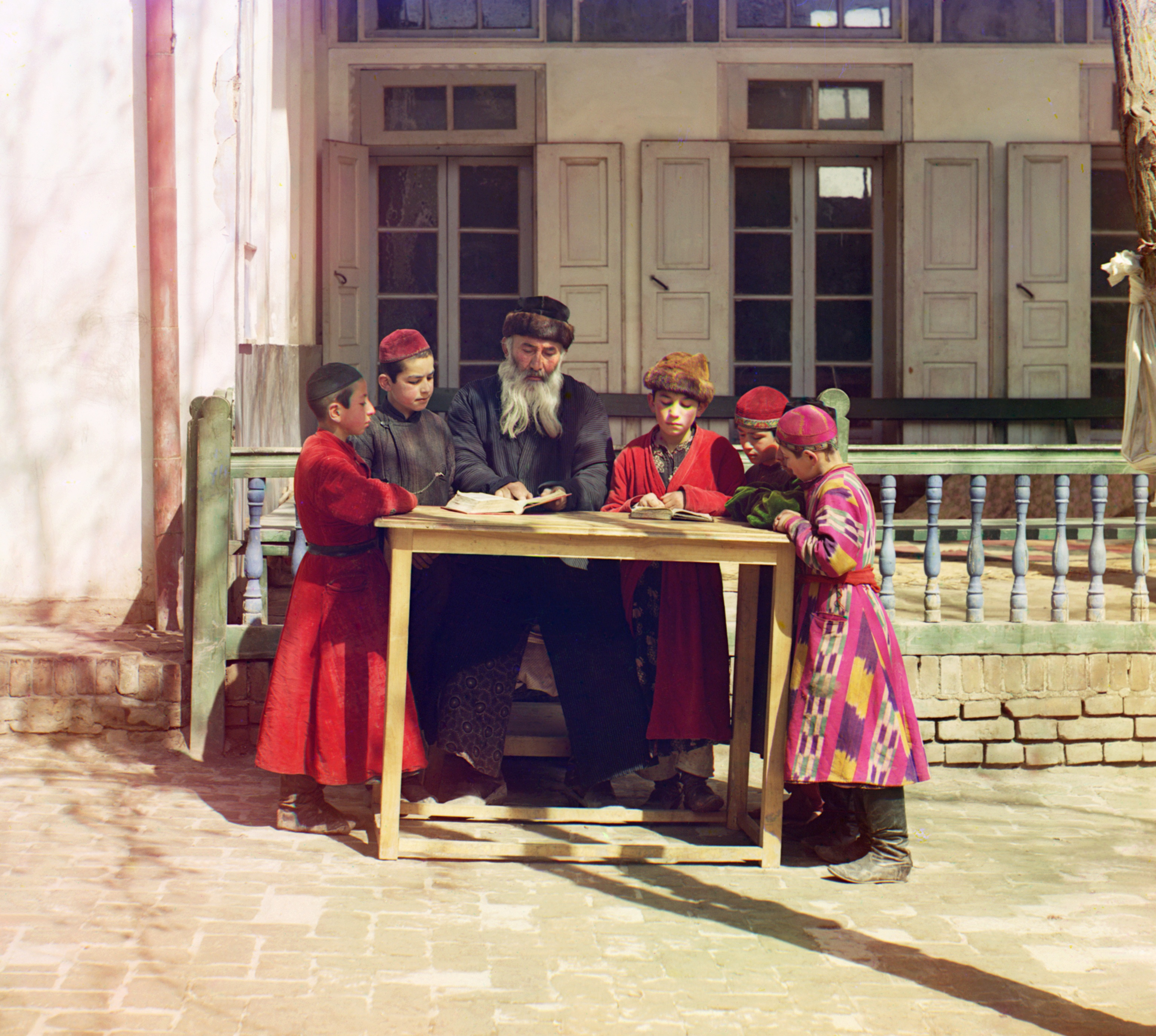
Jewish children with their teacher in Samarkand, c. 1905–1915

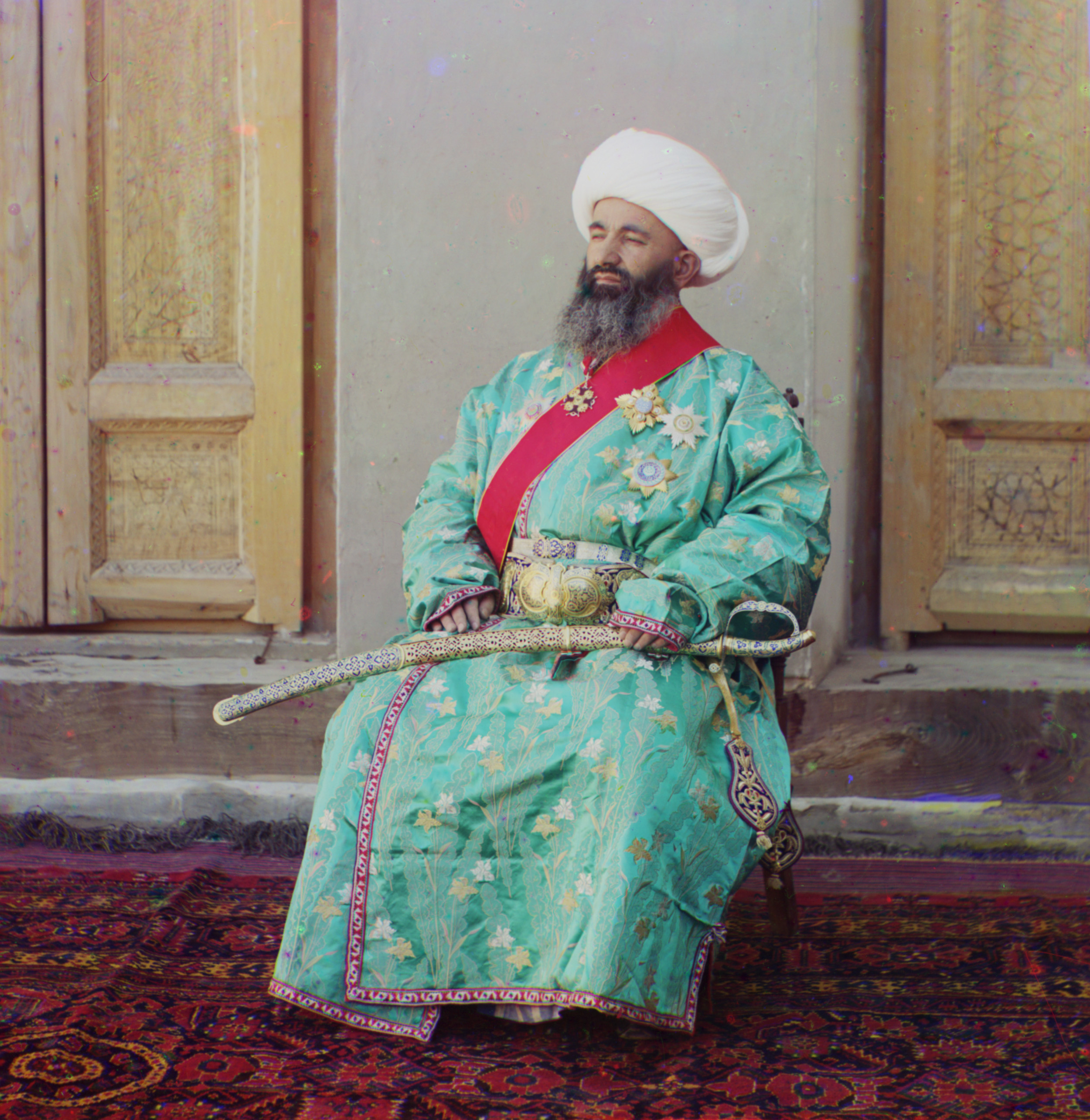
Kush-Beggi, Minister of the Interior of the Emirate of Bukhara, c. 1905–1915

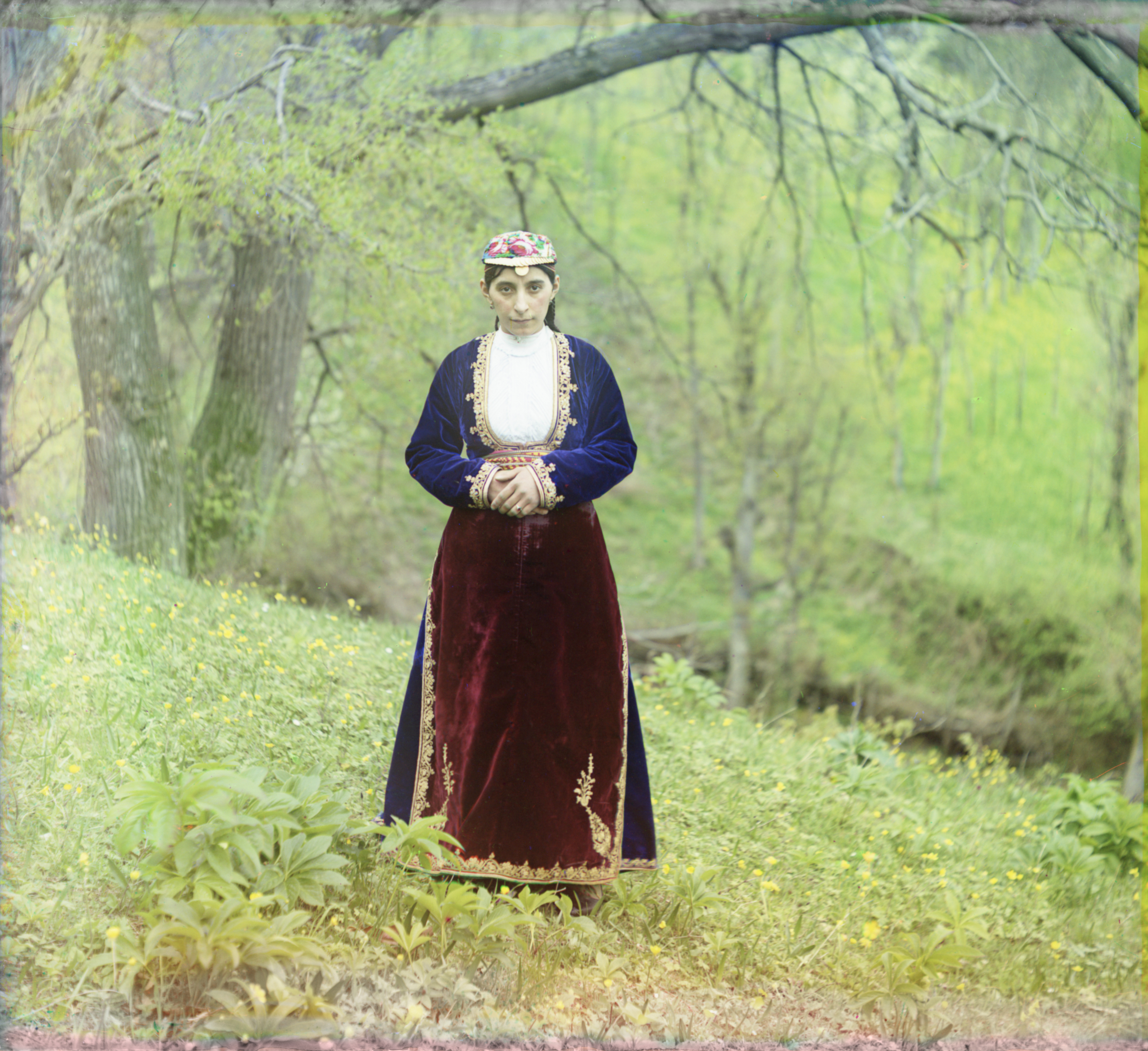
Armenian woman in national costume near Artvin, c. 1905–1915

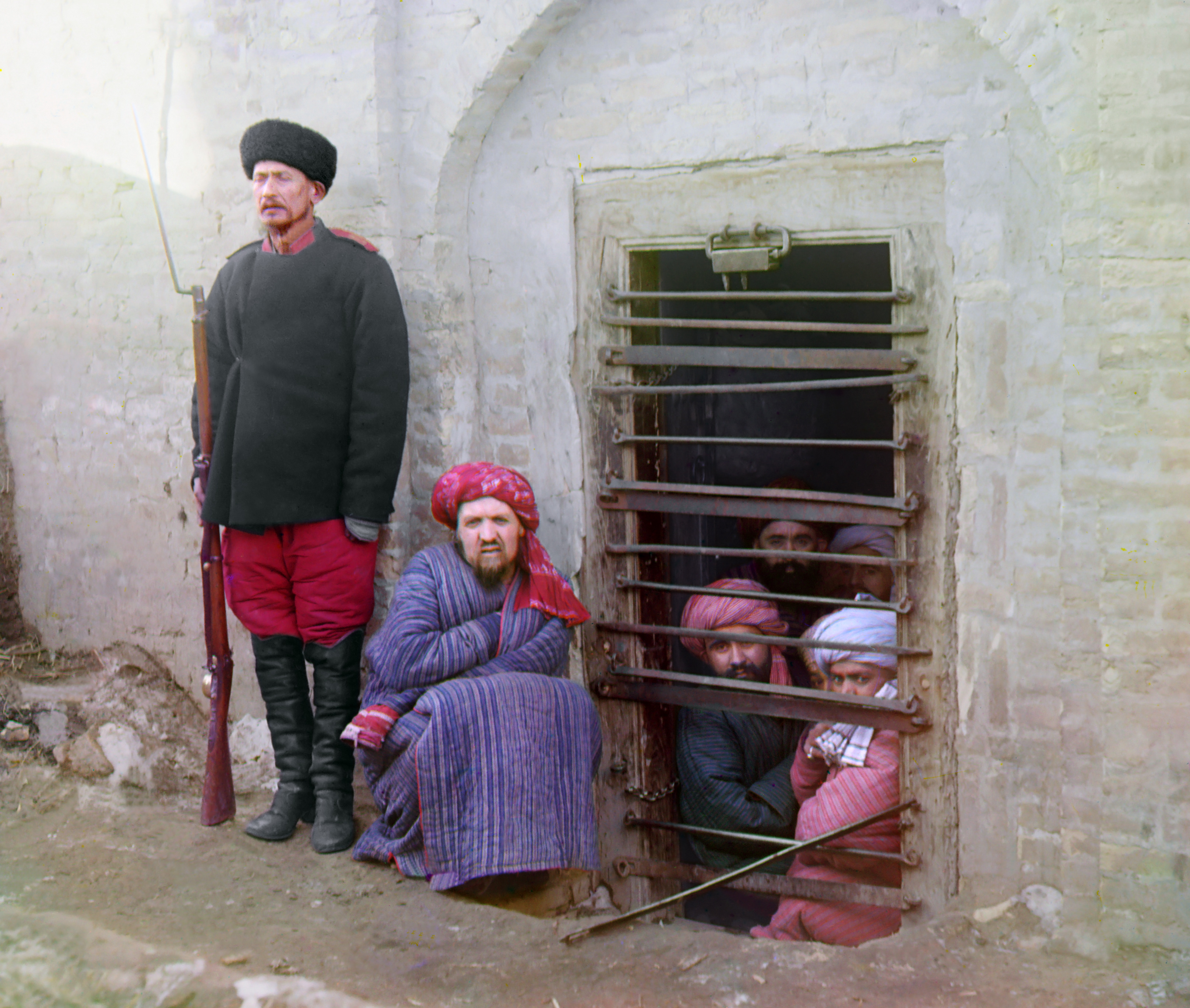
Zindan (prison) in Bukhara, 1907

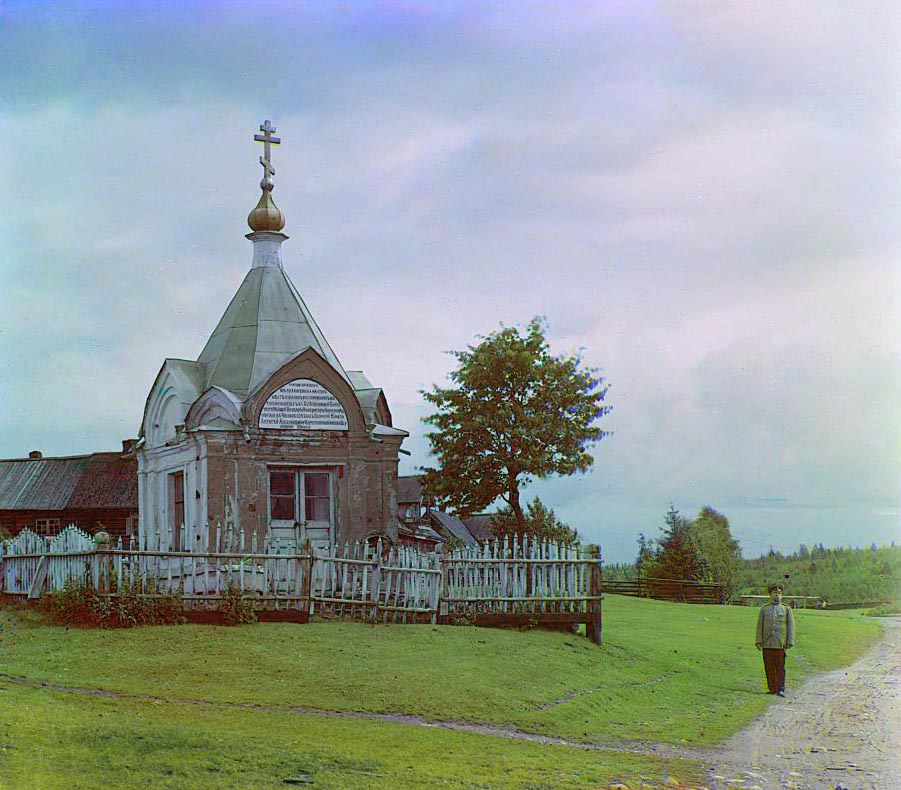
A chapel in Myatusovo, 1909

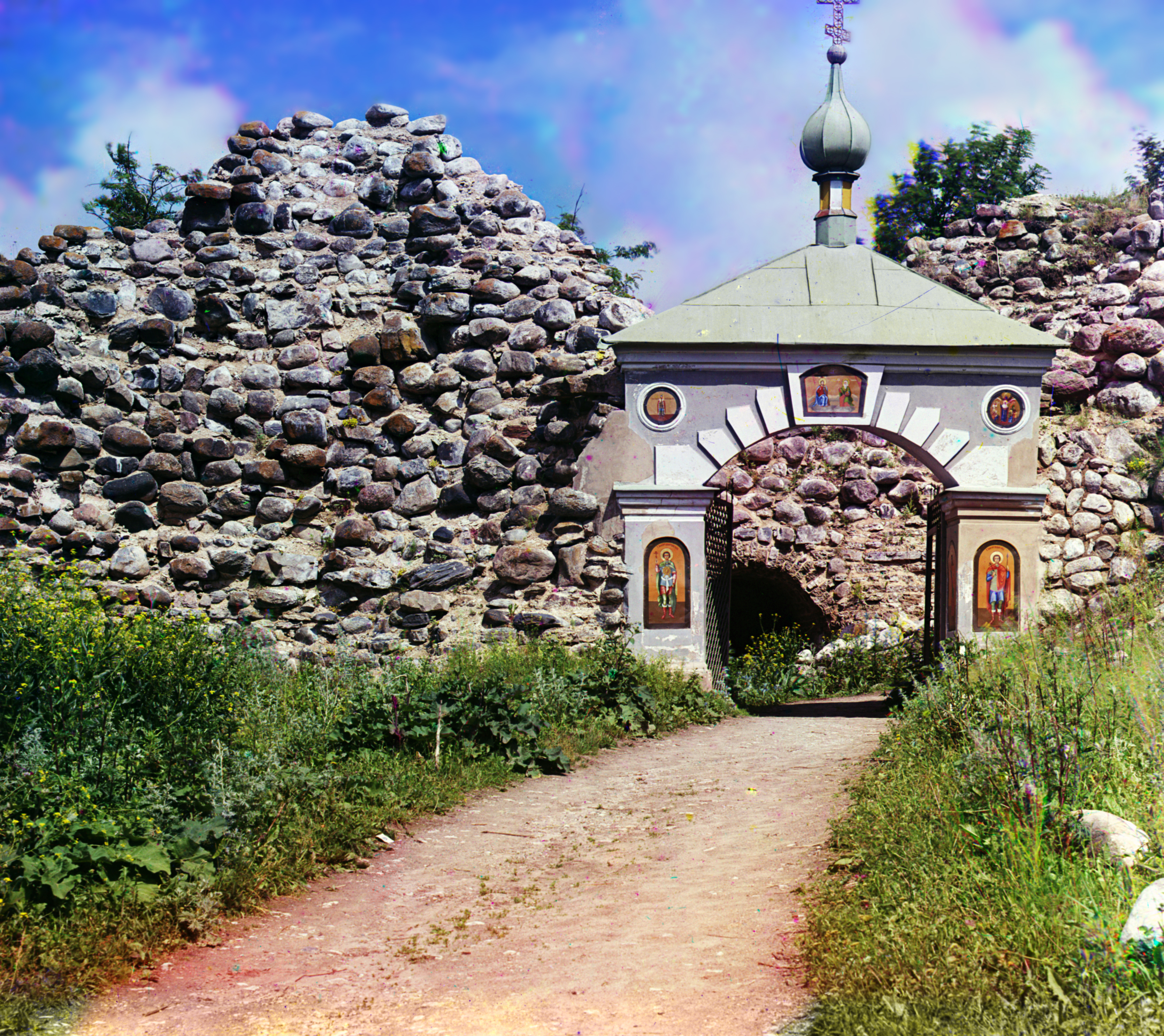
Staraya Ladoga Fortress, 1909

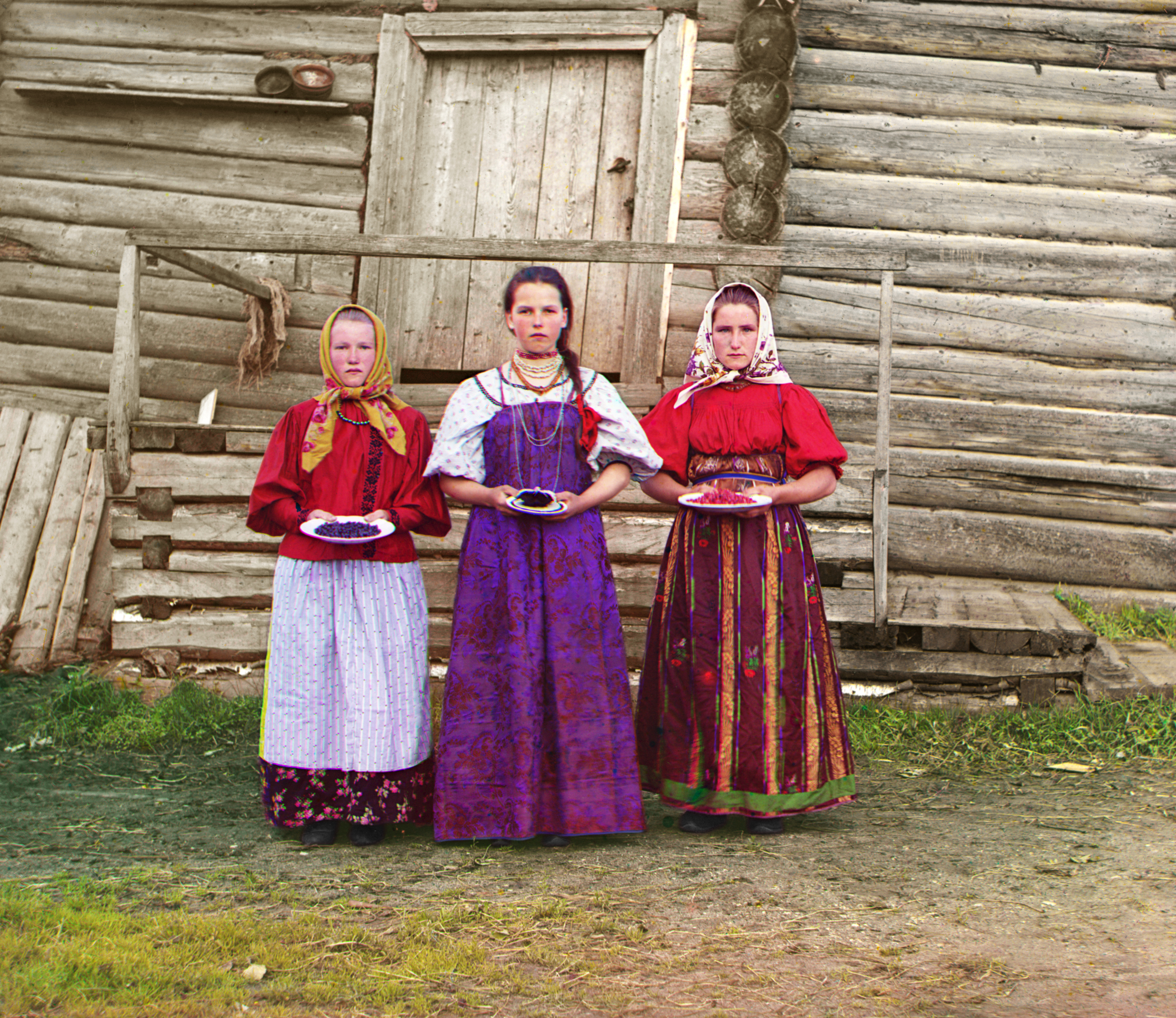
Russian peasant girls in a rural area along the Sheksna River near Kirillov, 1909

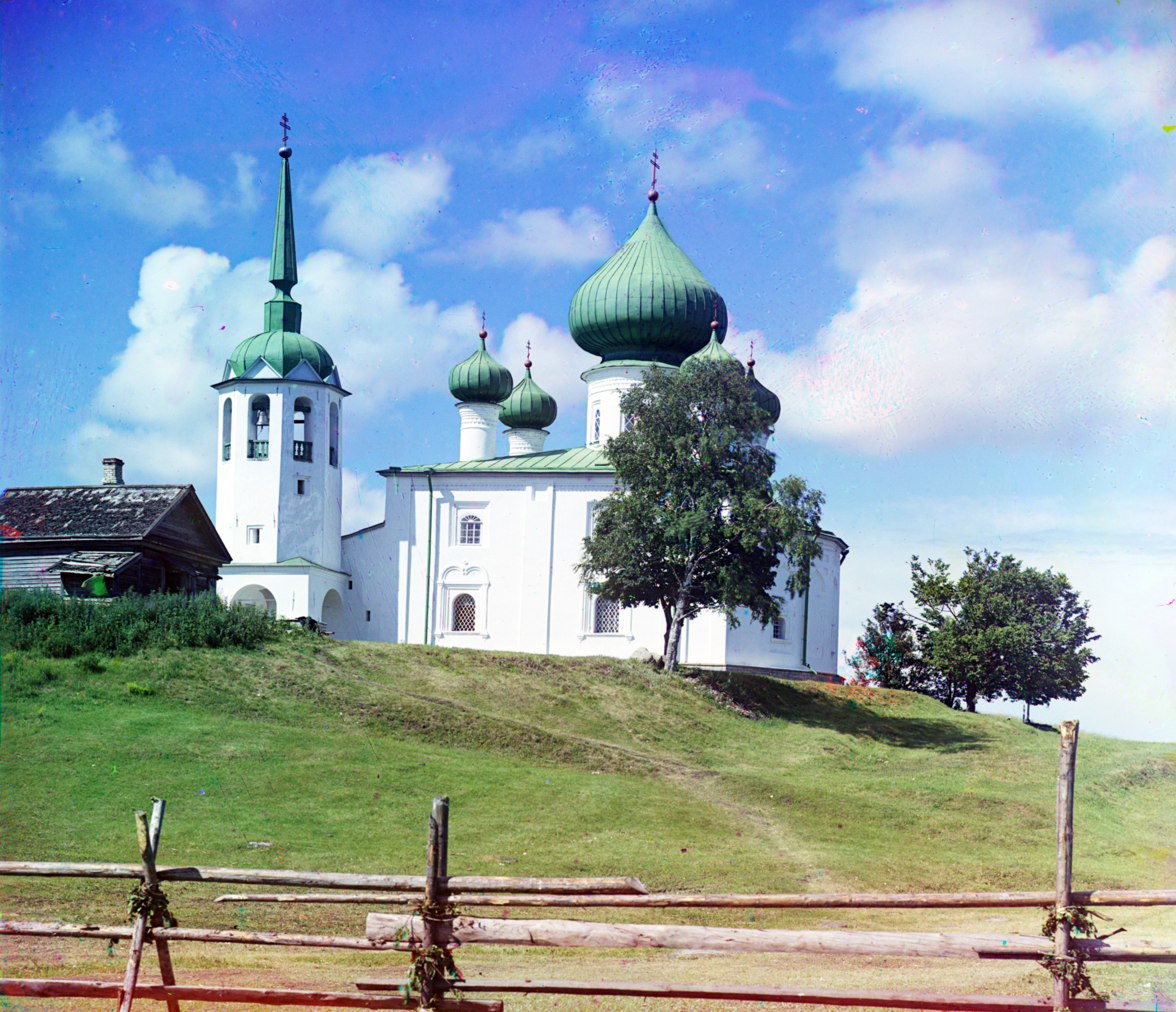
Church of St. John the Baptist on Malyshevaya Hill; Staraya Ladoga, 1909

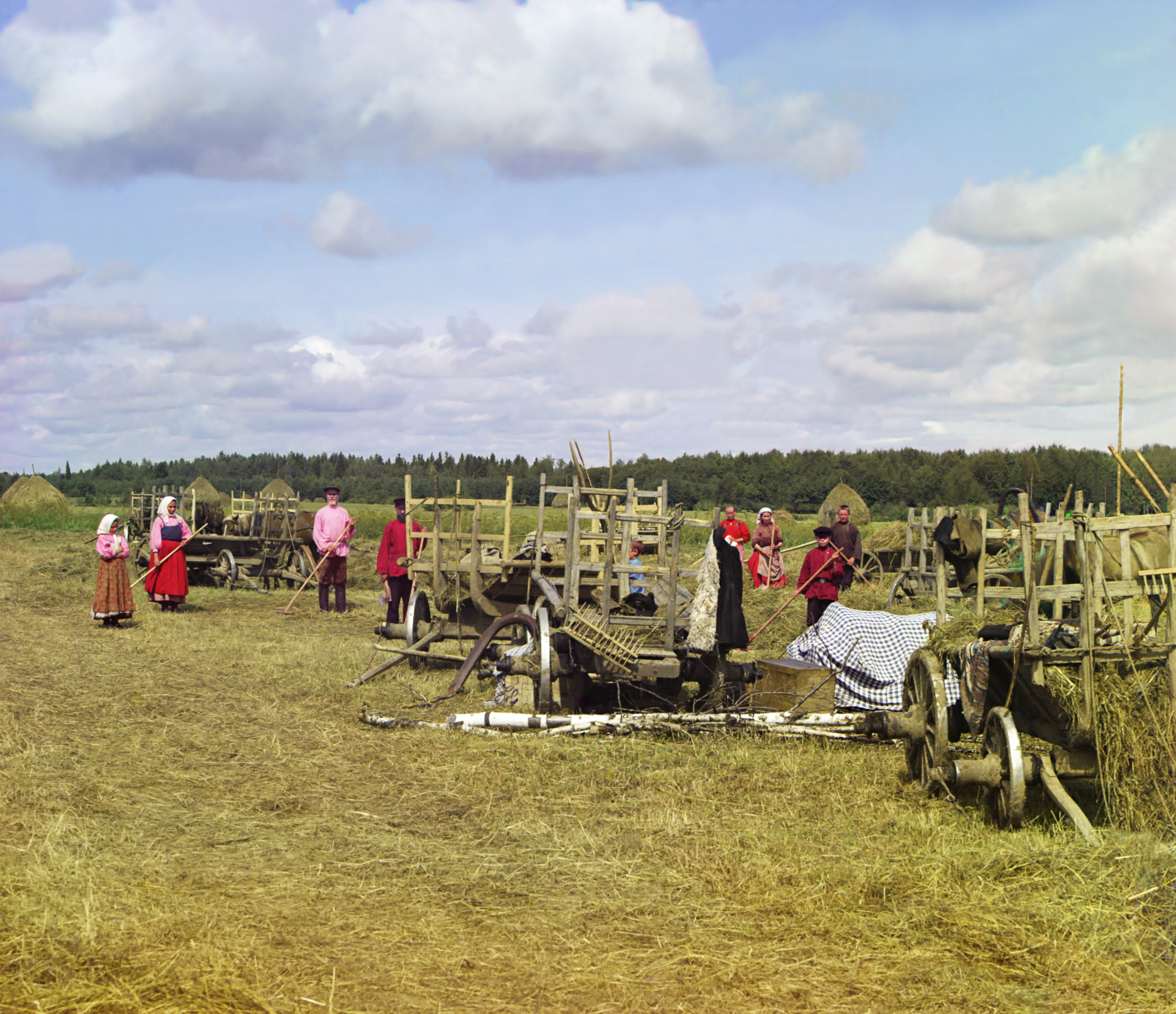
Haymaking farm workers standing near their equipment, taking a break, 1909

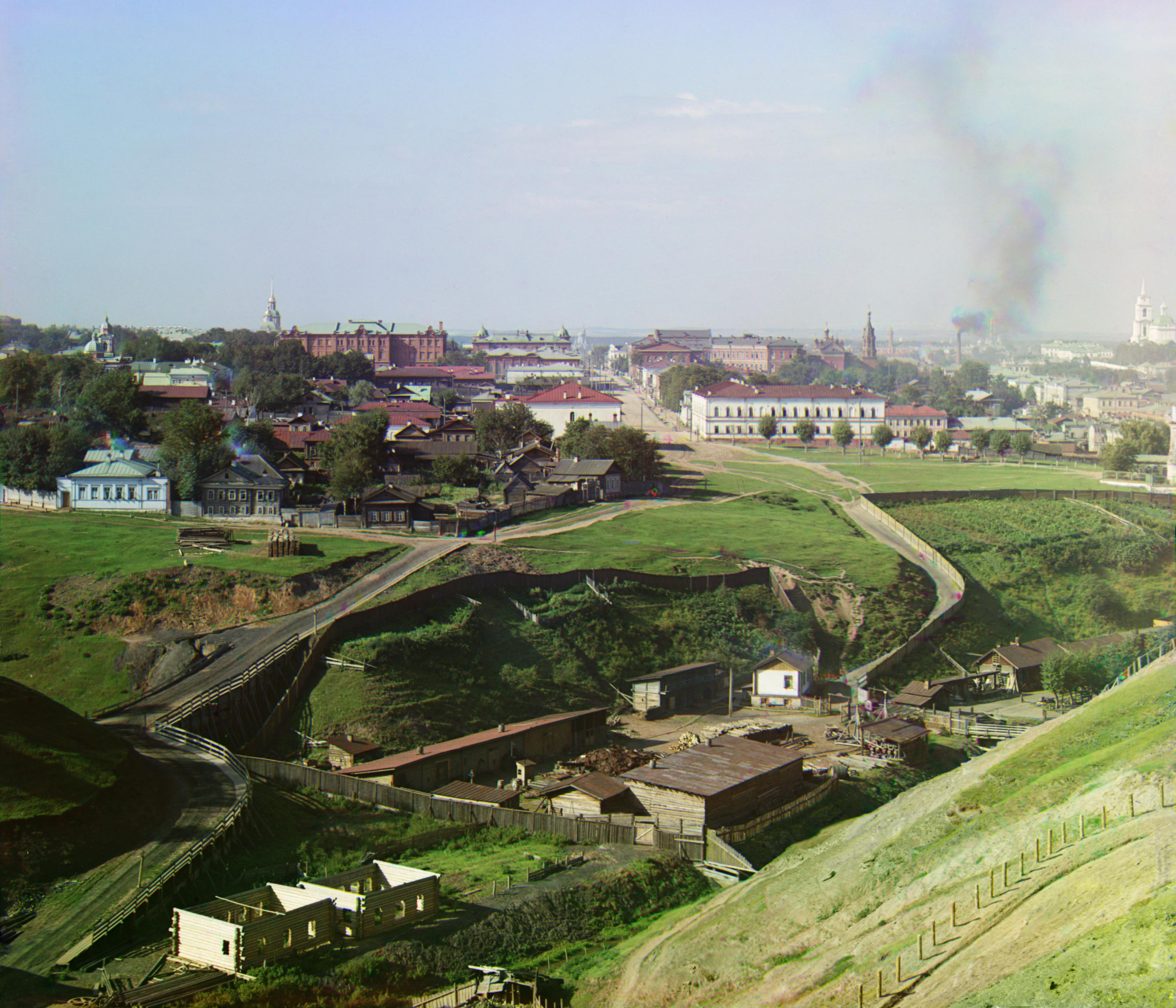
General view of the city of Perm, 1910

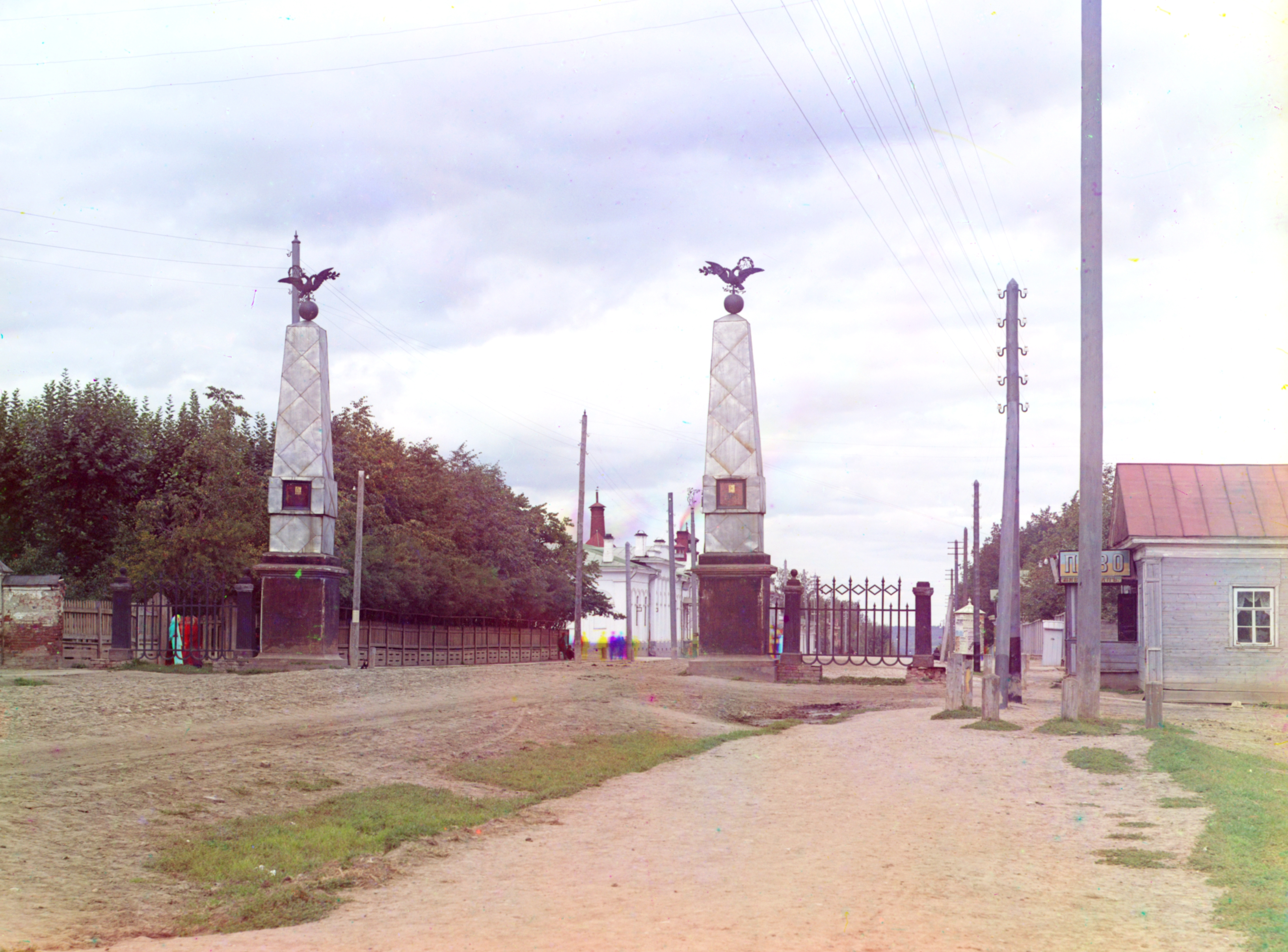
Staro-Sibirskaia Gate in the city of Perm, 1910

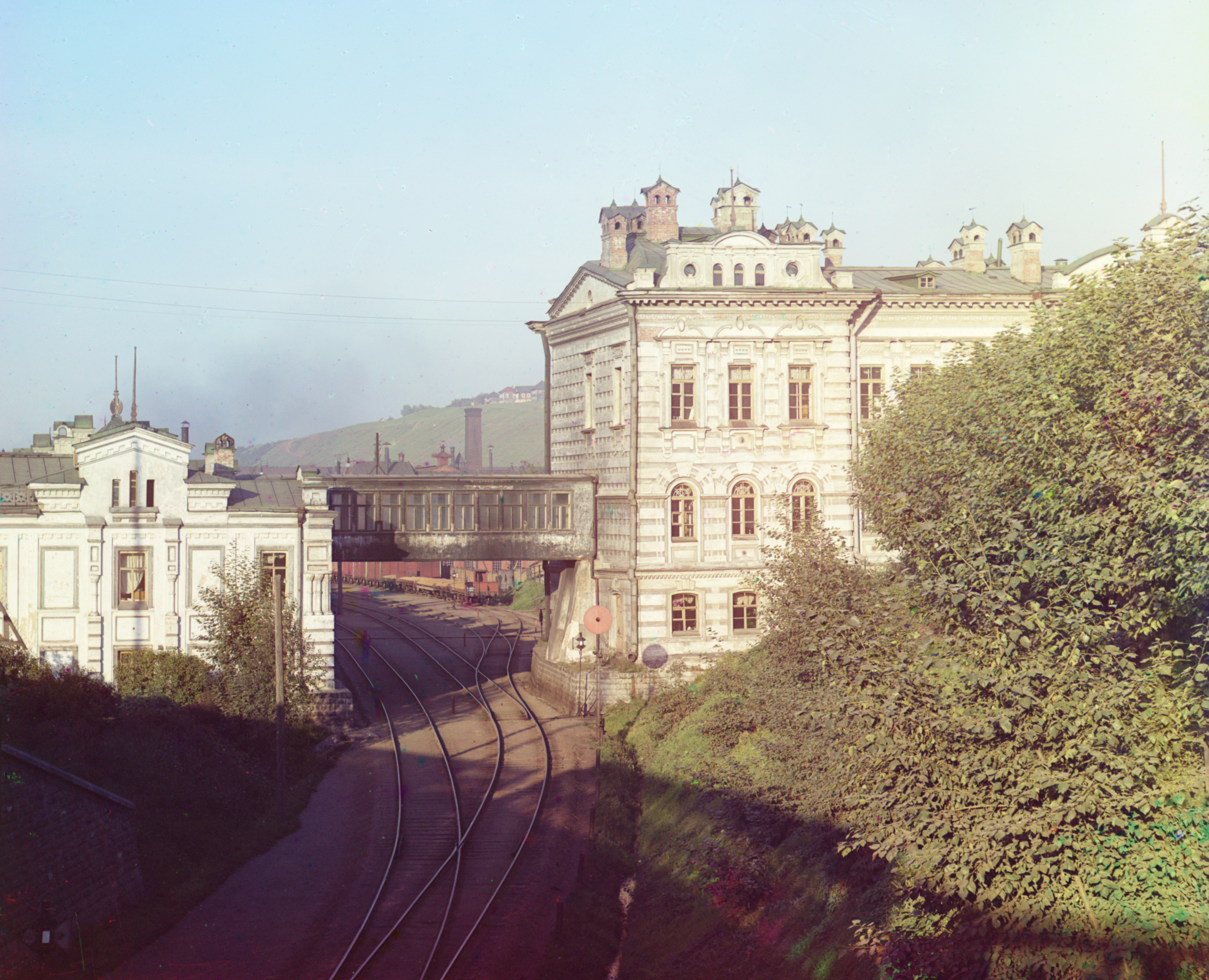
Headquarters of the Ural Railway Administration in the city of Perm, 1910

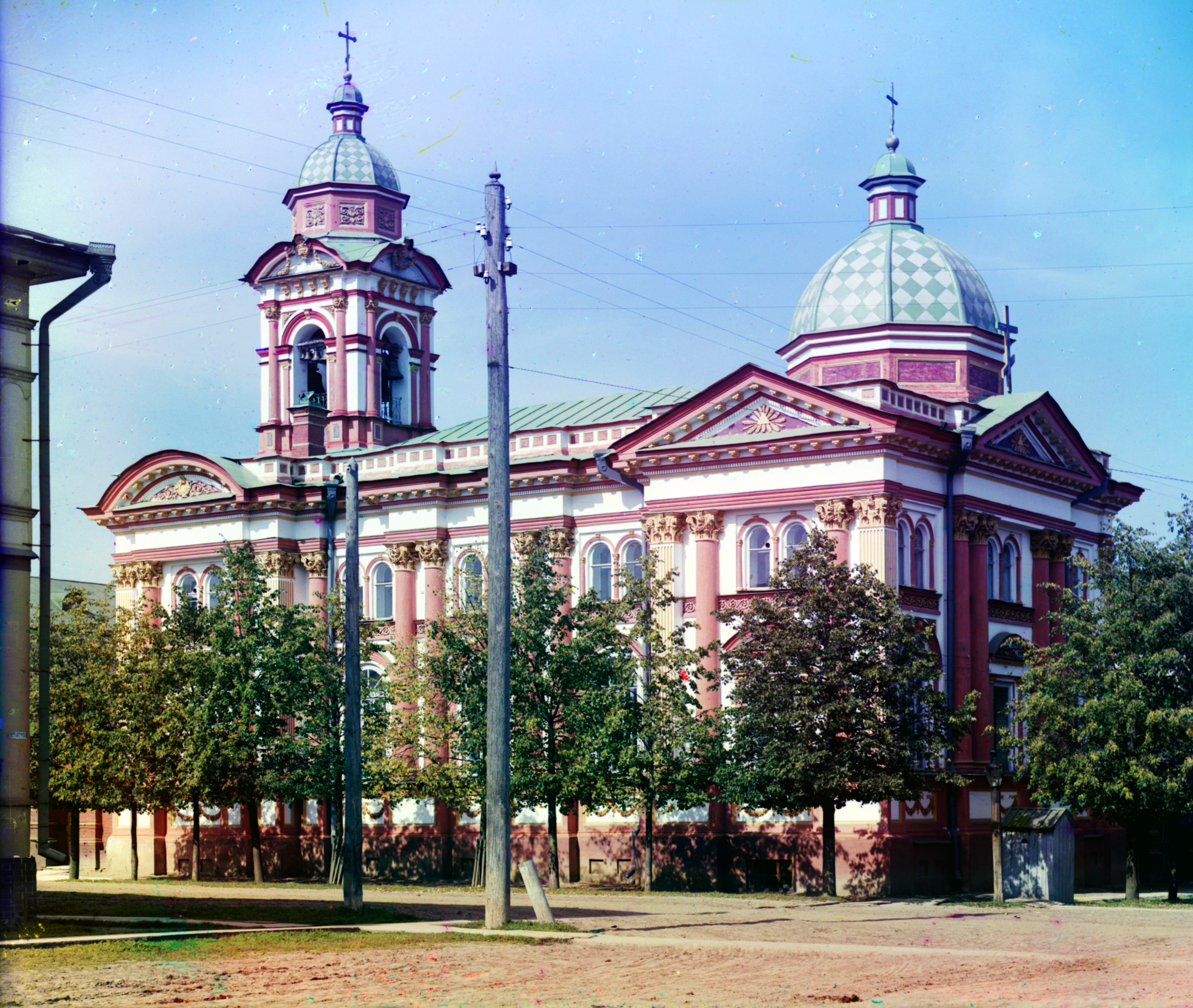
Mary Magdalene Church in the city of Perm, 1910

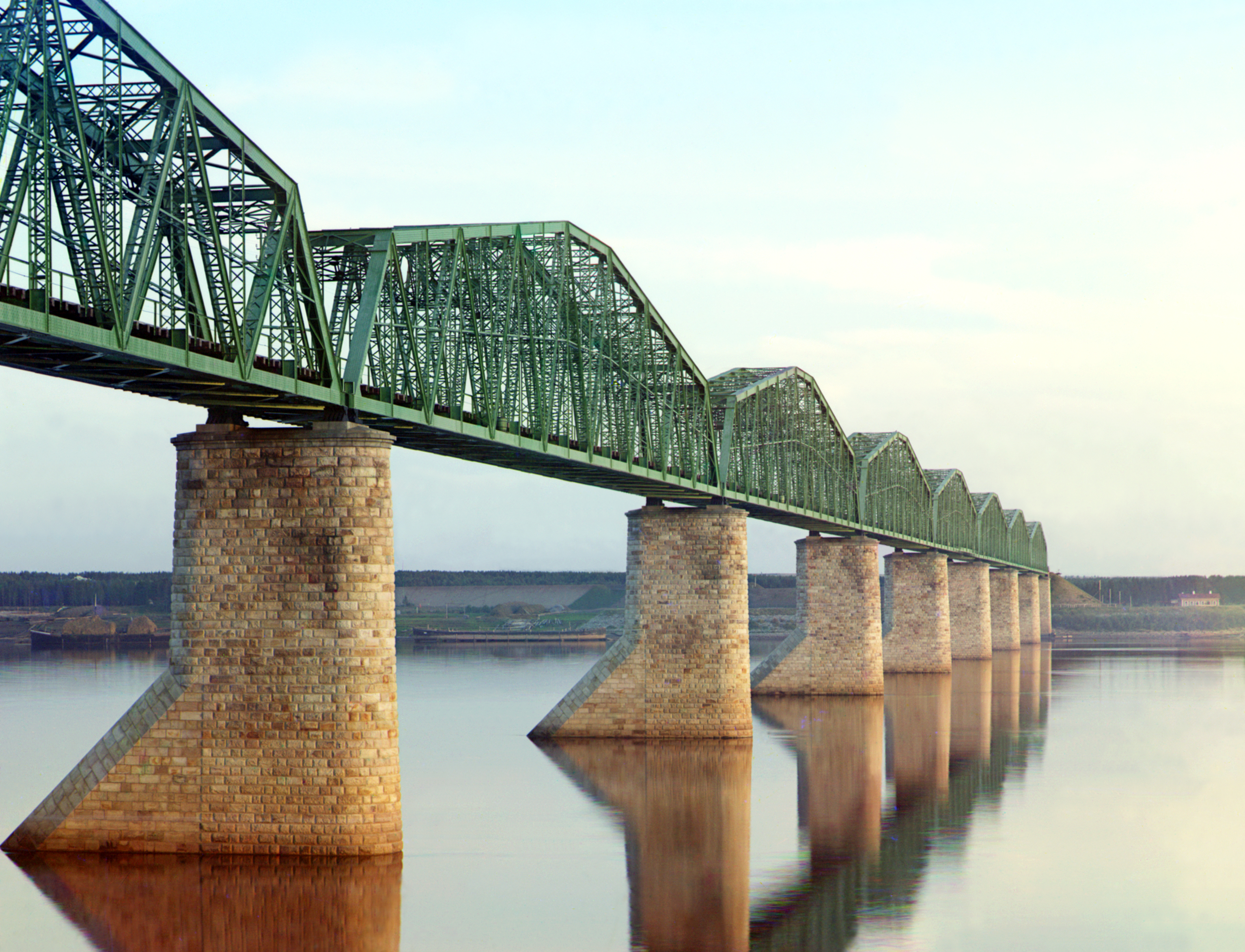
Kama river near Perm, 1910. The bridge still stands today, but another similar bridge has been built alongside it.

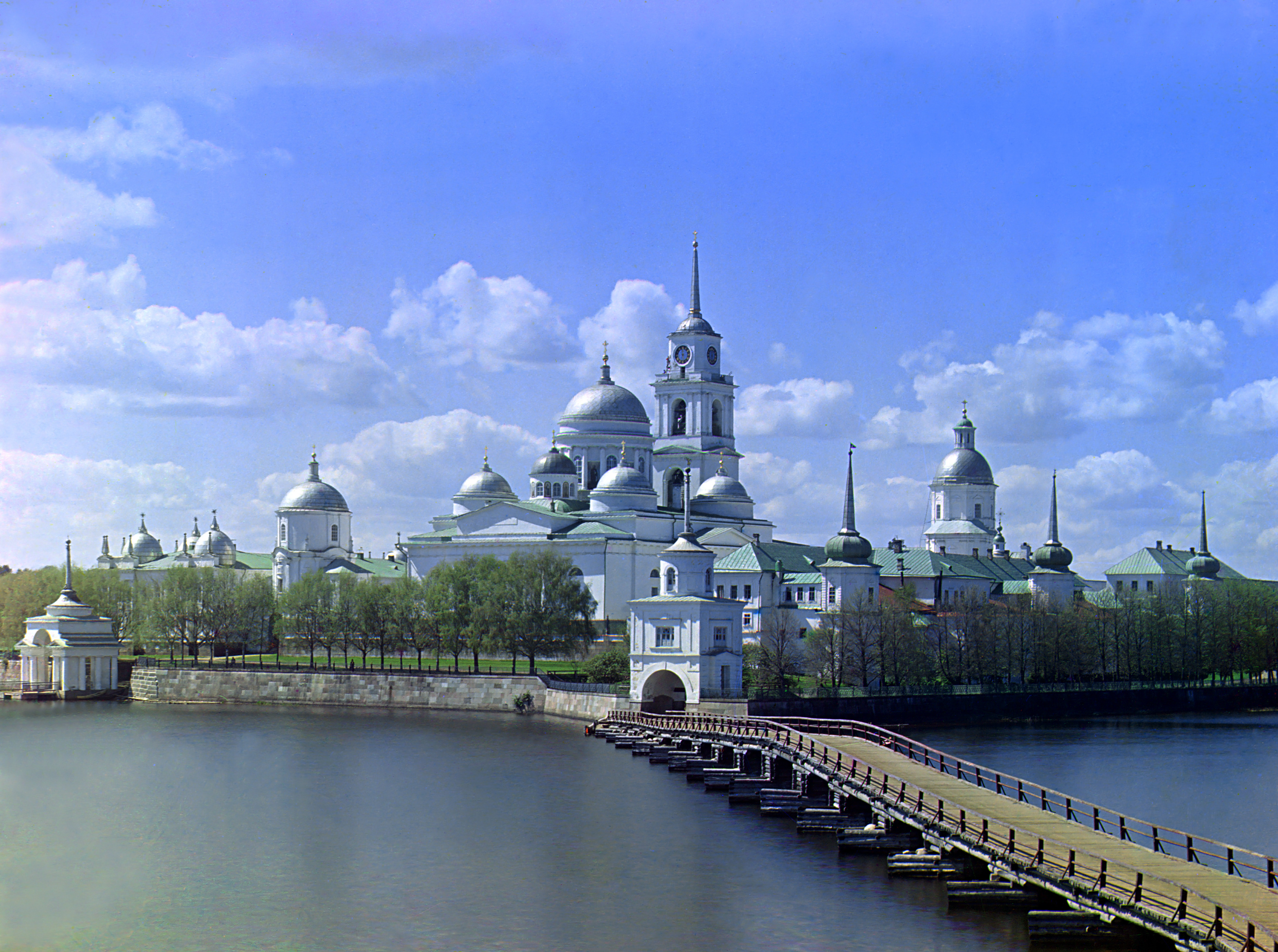
Monastery of St. Nilus on Stolbny Island near Ostashkov, 1910

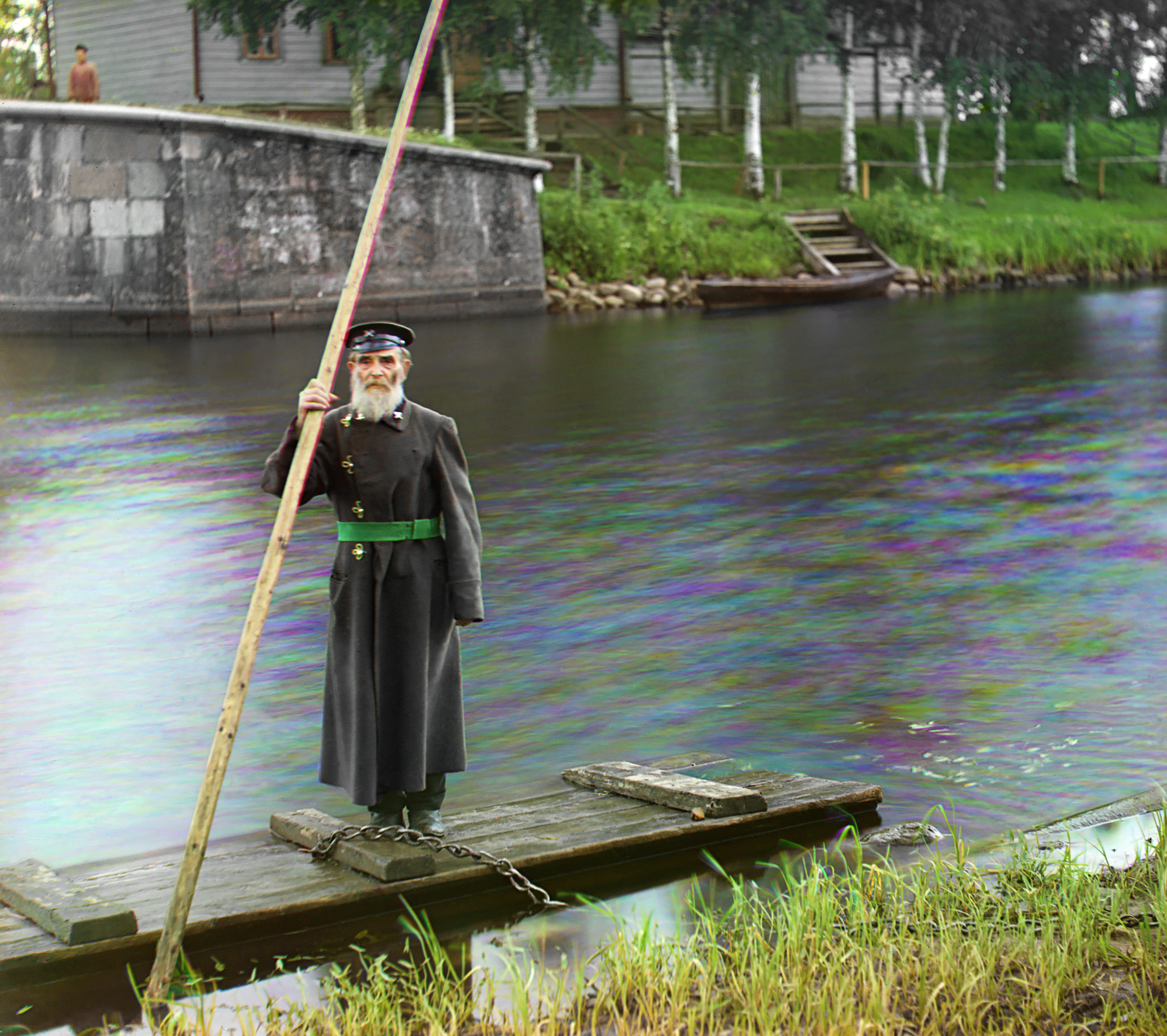
Pinchas Karlinskiy, supervisor of a floodgate at Chernigov, 1910

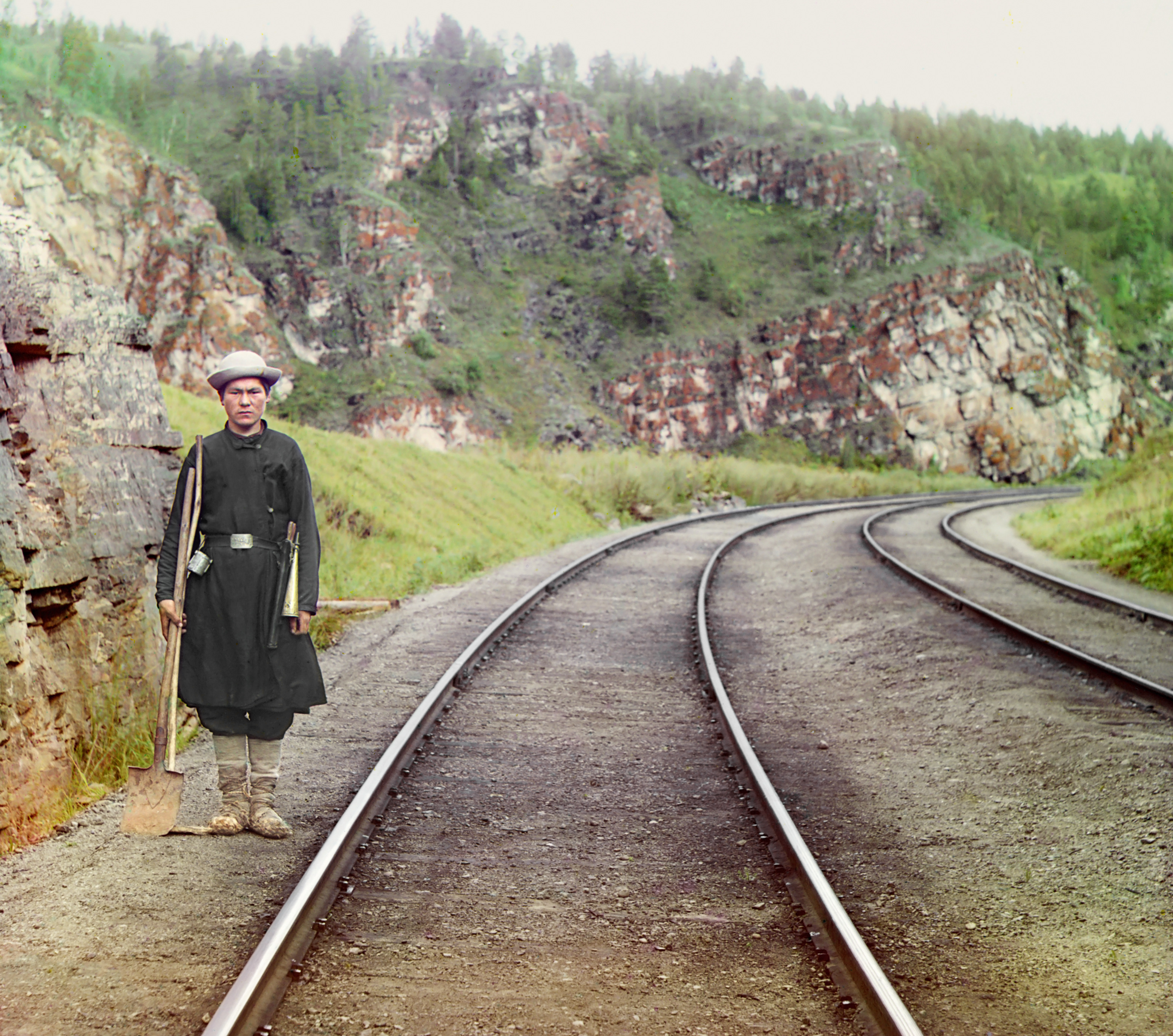
Bashkir switchman near Ust-Katav, 1910

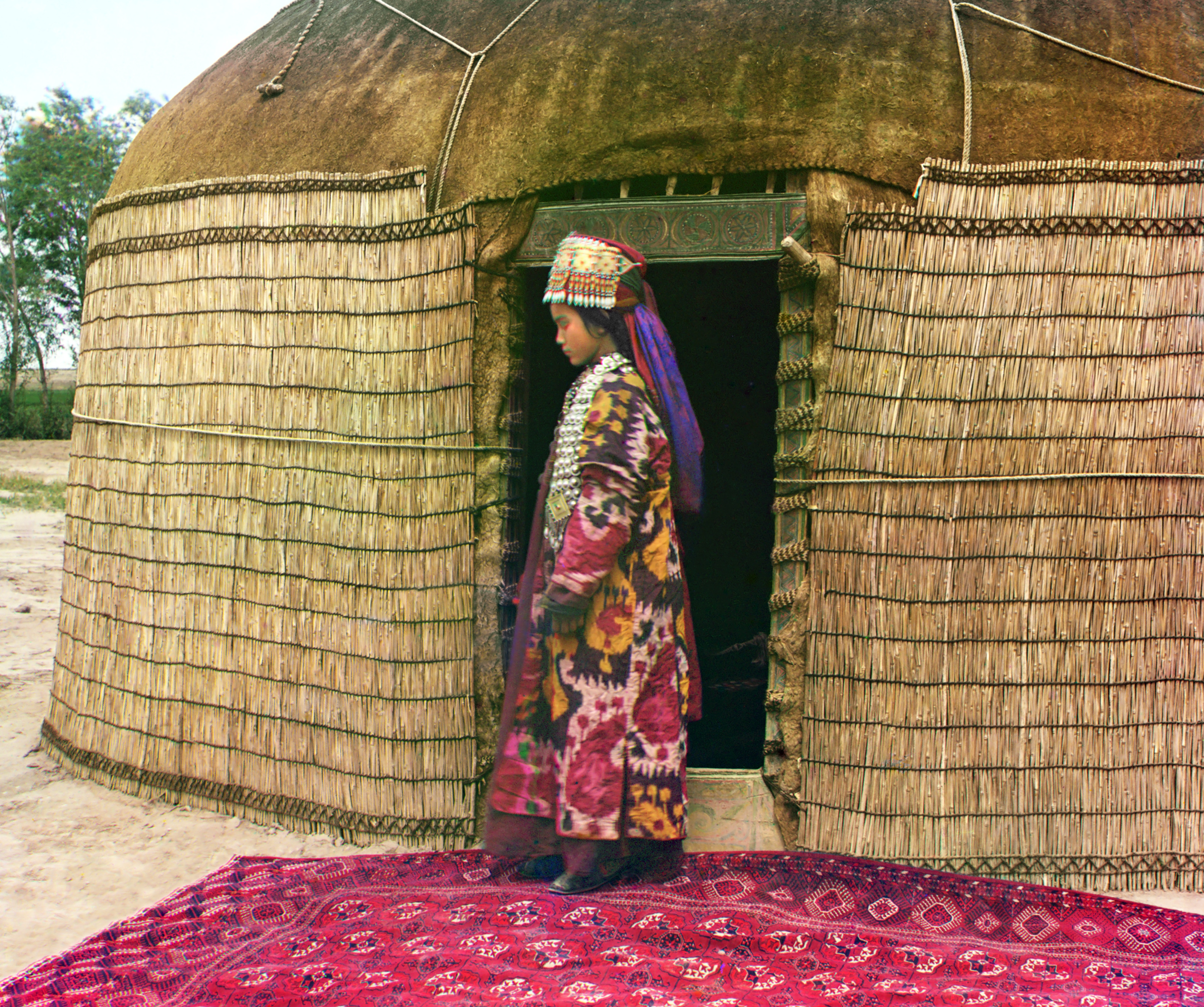
Woman in traditional dress standing on rug in front of yurt, 1911

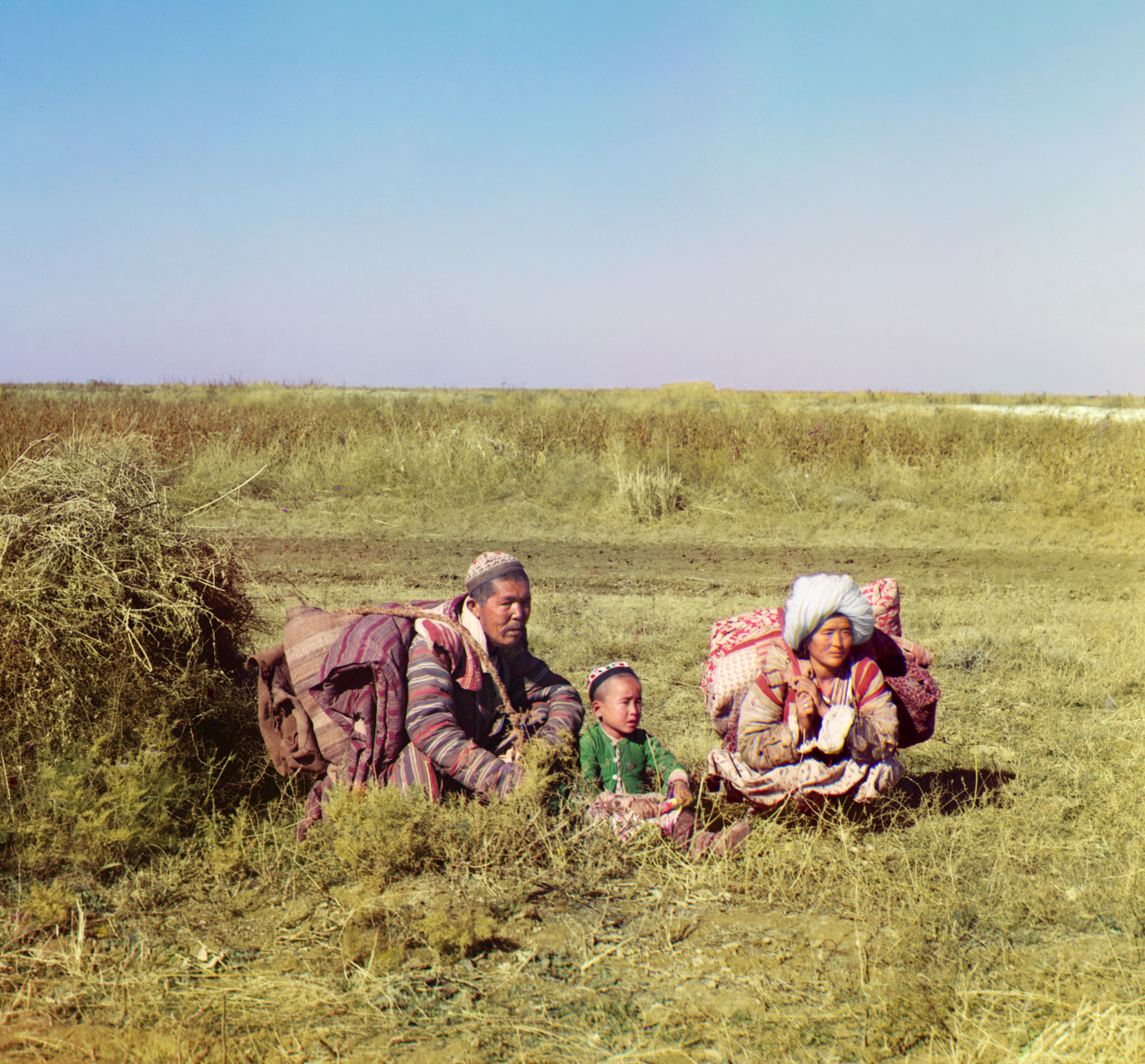
Nomadic Kyrgyz family on the Mirzachoʻl Steppe, 1911

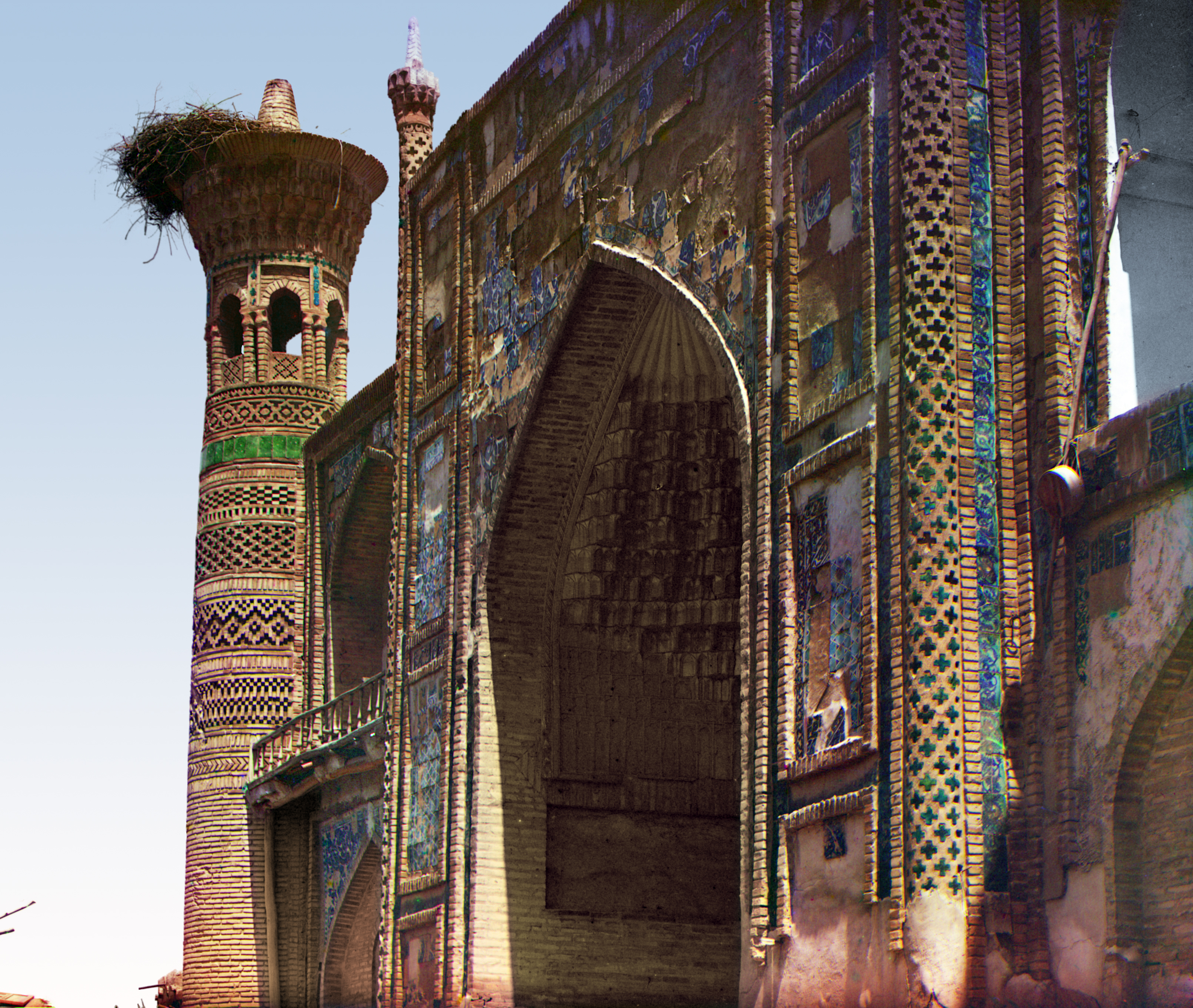
Madrasah of Muhammad Amin Tupchiboshi (now demolished) in Bukhara, circa 1912

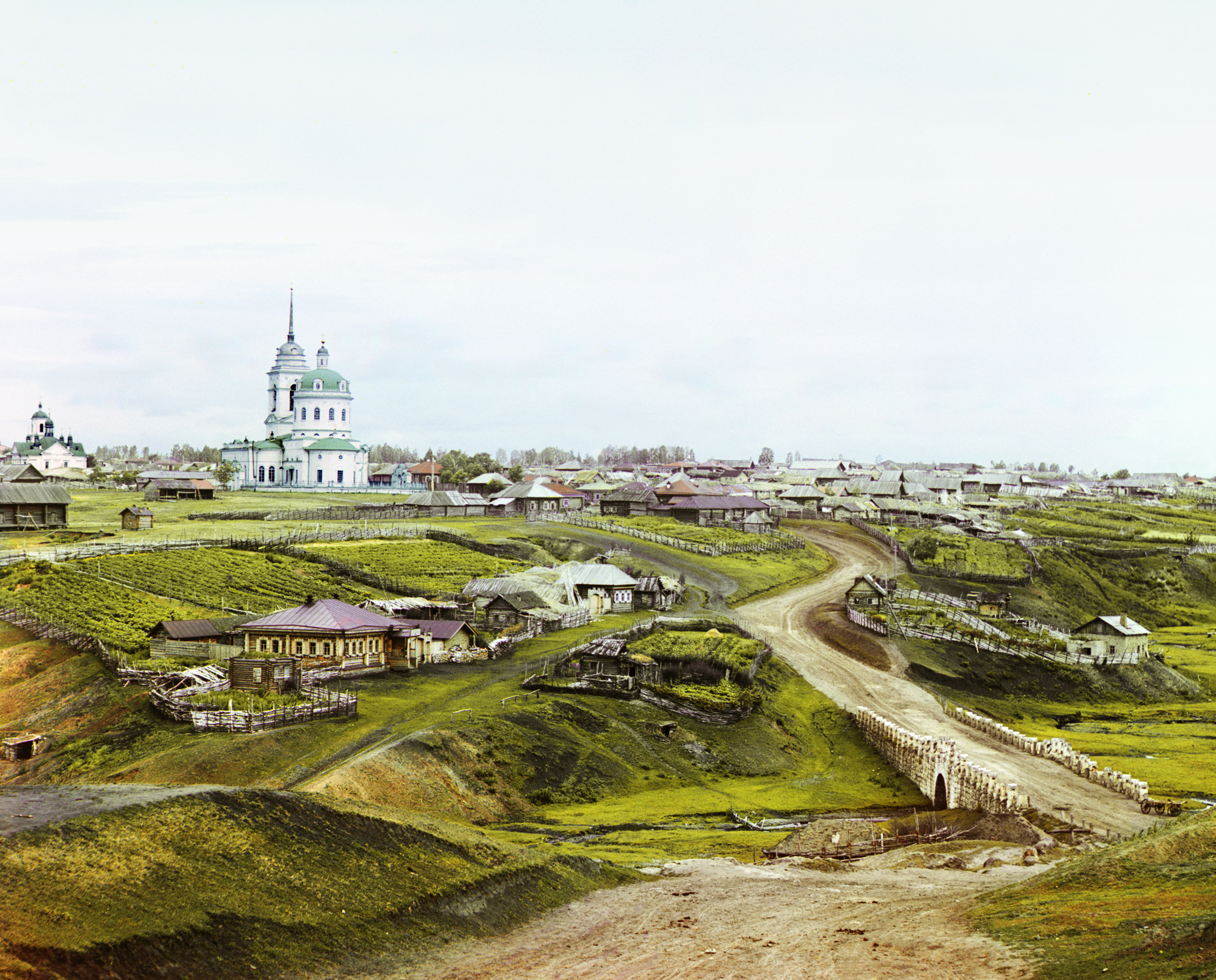
The Village of Kolchedan in Ural Mountains, 1912

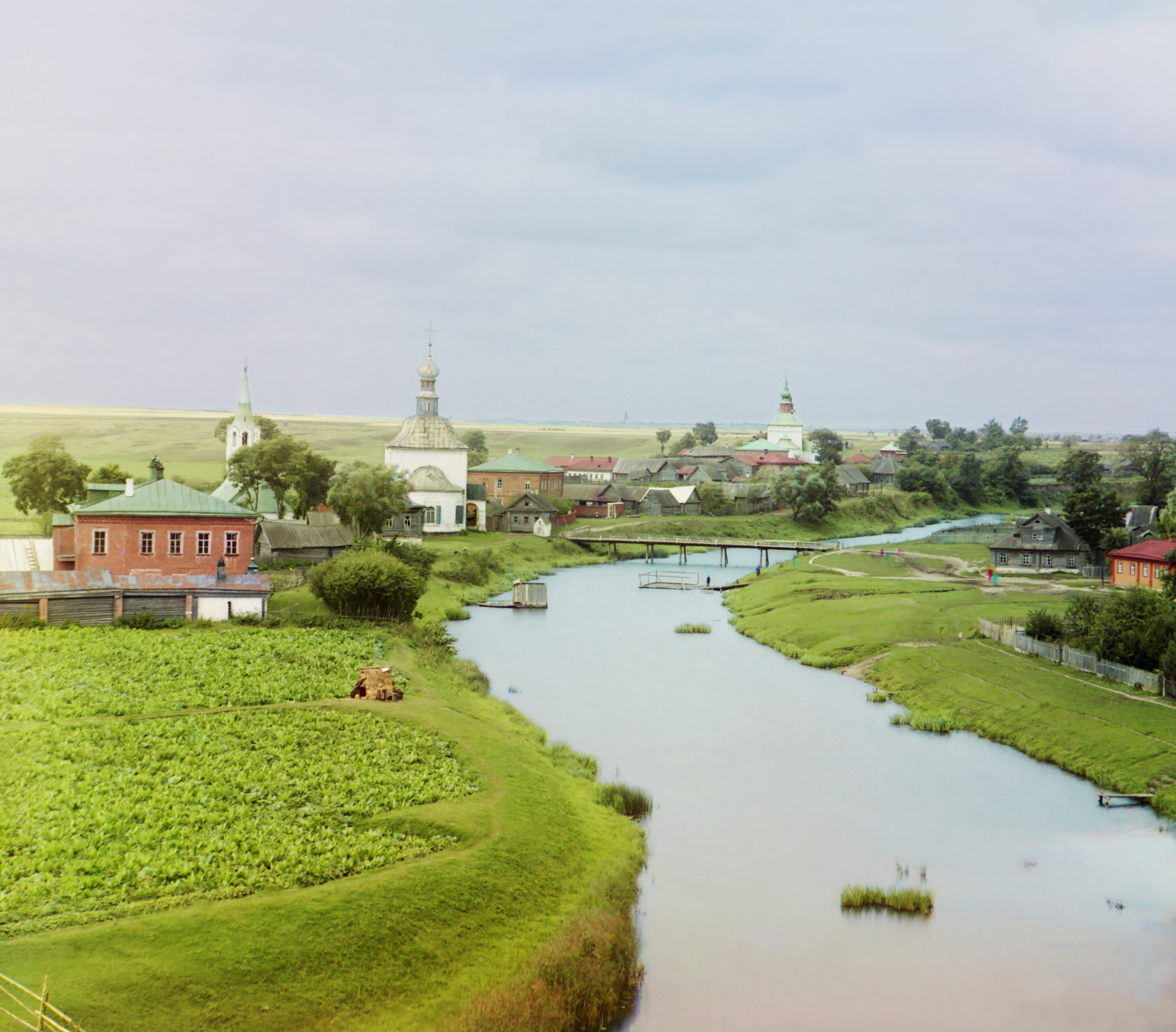
View of Suzdal along the Kamenka River, 1912

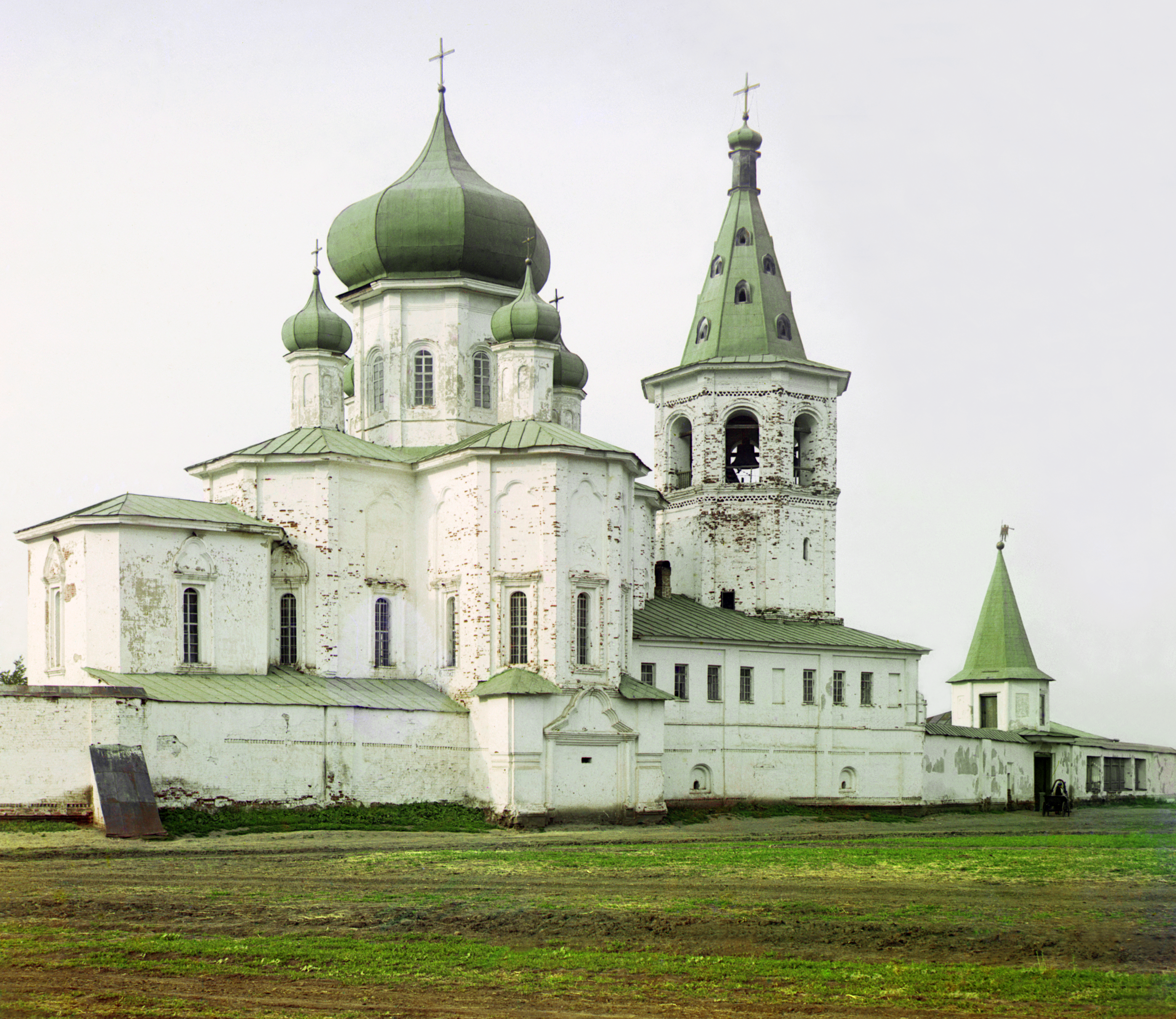
The mid-18th century Trinity Monastery in Tyumen, 1912

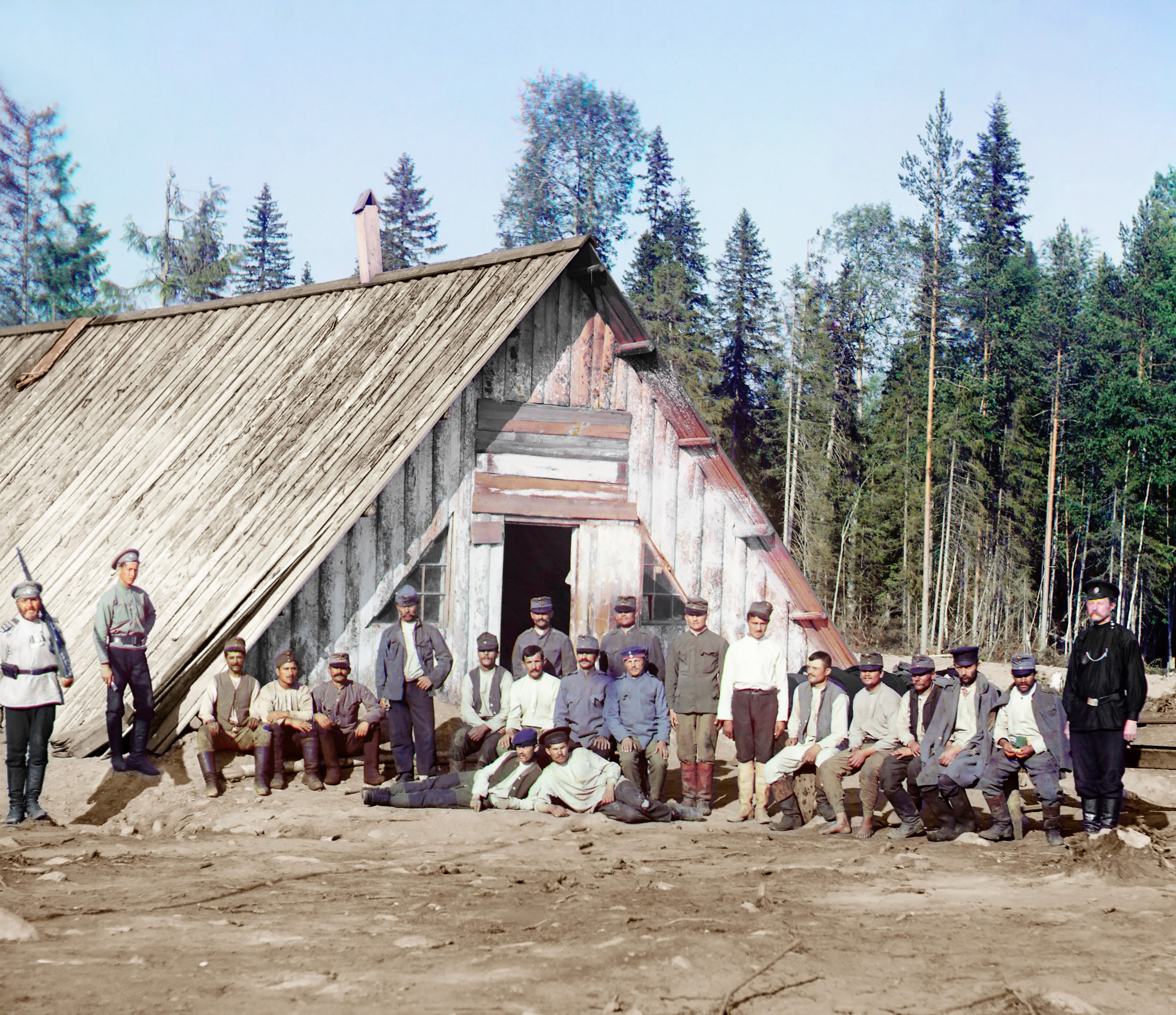
Austro-Hungarian POWs in Russian Karelia during World War I, 1915

== See also ==
- Photochrom, a different kind of forerunner of modern color photography
- Levi Hill
- Thomas Sutton (photographer)
- Albert Kahn, a patron of photography who funded photographers to travel around the world recording color images and cine film of diverse ethnic societies between 1909 and 1931.
- Ansel Adams, American black-and-white photographer who was commissioned by a number of organizations to document the American West.
- Gabriel Veyre
