= Funikova Gora =

Funikova Gora Фуникова Гора
- Village
- Location within Vladimir Oblast Location within Russia
- Coordinates: 56°09′N 39°09′E
- Country: Russia
- Region: Vladimir Oblast
- District: Kirzhachsky District
- Time zone: UTC+3:00

Funikova Gora (Russian: Фуникова Гора) is a rural locality (a village) in Kiprevskoye Rural Settlement, Kirzhachsky District, Vladimir Oblast, Russia. The population was 4 as of 2010.

There is the single street, named Polevaya.

The village is probably best-known as the birthplace of Sergey Prokudin-Gorsky, Russian-French photographer, a pioneer in colour photography.

== Geography ==
Funikova Gora is located 25 km east of Kirzhach (the district's administrative centre) by road. Fetinovo is the nearest rural locality.
