= Korolistskali =

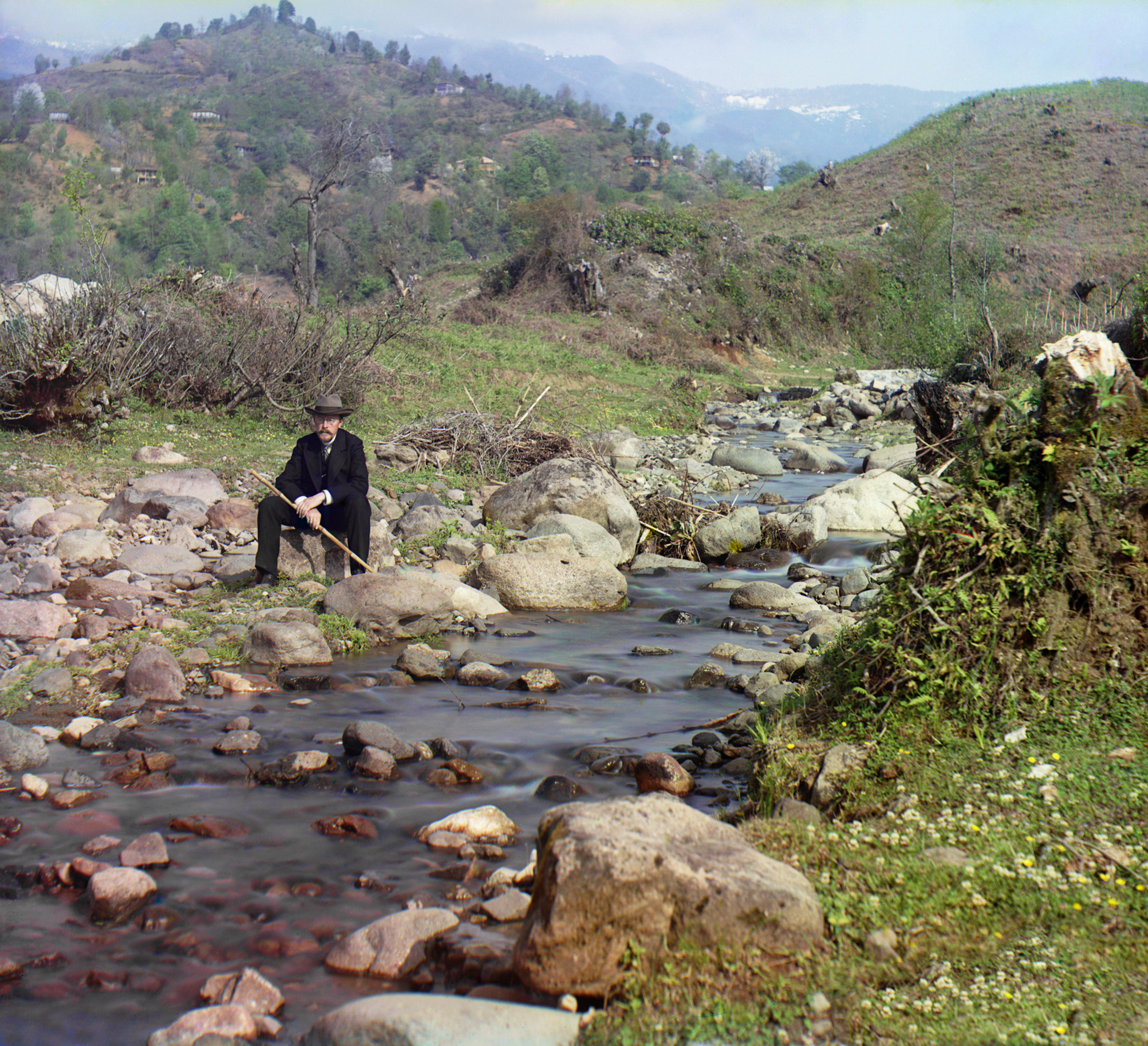
- Color photo from 1912 by Prokudin-Gorsky (self-portrait)
- Native name: ყოროლისწყალი (Georgian)

Location
- Country: Georgia

Physical characteristics
- Mouth: Black Sea
  - coordinates: 41.6571°N 41.683°E
- Length: 29.5 km (18.3 mi)
- Basin size: 159 km^{2} (61 sq mi)

The Korolistskali (Georgian: ყოროლისწყალი, alternative name Karolitskhali) is a river by the East coast of the Black Sea, near Batumi, Georgia.

== History ==
Between 1907 and 1915, during the period of Tsarist Russia, pioneering Russian photographer Sergey Prokudin-Gorsky took a self-portrait on the Korolistskali River - it is one of the earliest colour photographs ever taken.
