= Pokrovsky Uyezd =

Pokrovsky Uyezd (Покровский уезд) was one of the subdivisions of the Vladimir Governorate of the Russian Empire. It was situated in the western part of the governorate. Its administrative centre was Pokrov.

== Demographics ==
At the time of the Russian Empire Census of 1897, Pokrovsky Uyezd had a population of 158,229. Of these, 99.7% spoke Russian, 0.1% Yiddish and 0.1% Tatar as their native language.
