= Arseny Morozov House =

Building in Moscow, Russia

Coordinates: 55.75311806707009°N 37.60333685040368°E

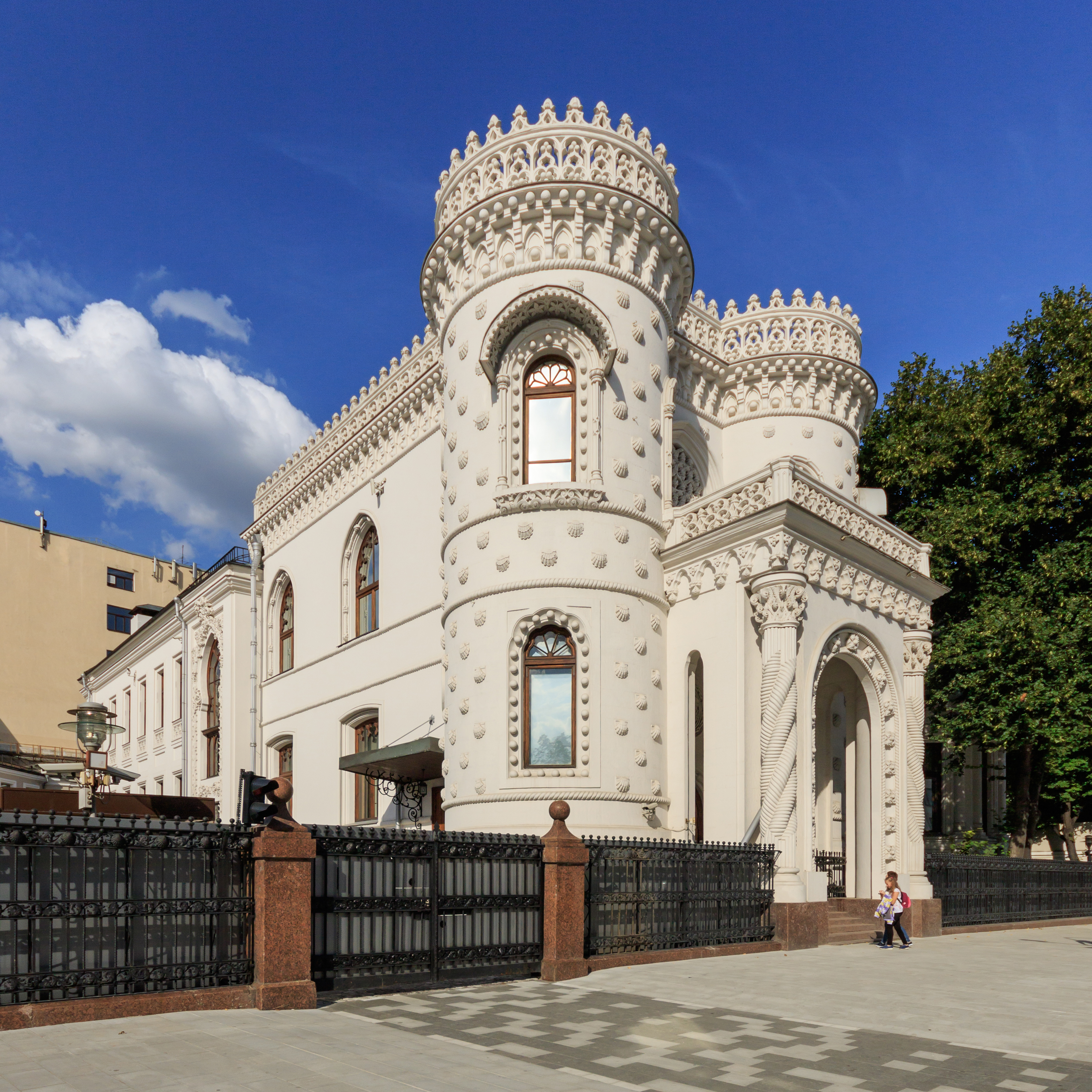
- Interactive map of the Arseny Morozov House area

General information
- Type: House
- Architectural style: eclectic; Neo-Manueline
- Location: 16 Vozdvizhenka Street, Moscow, Russia
- Opened: 1854

Design and construction
- Architect: Viktor Mazyrin

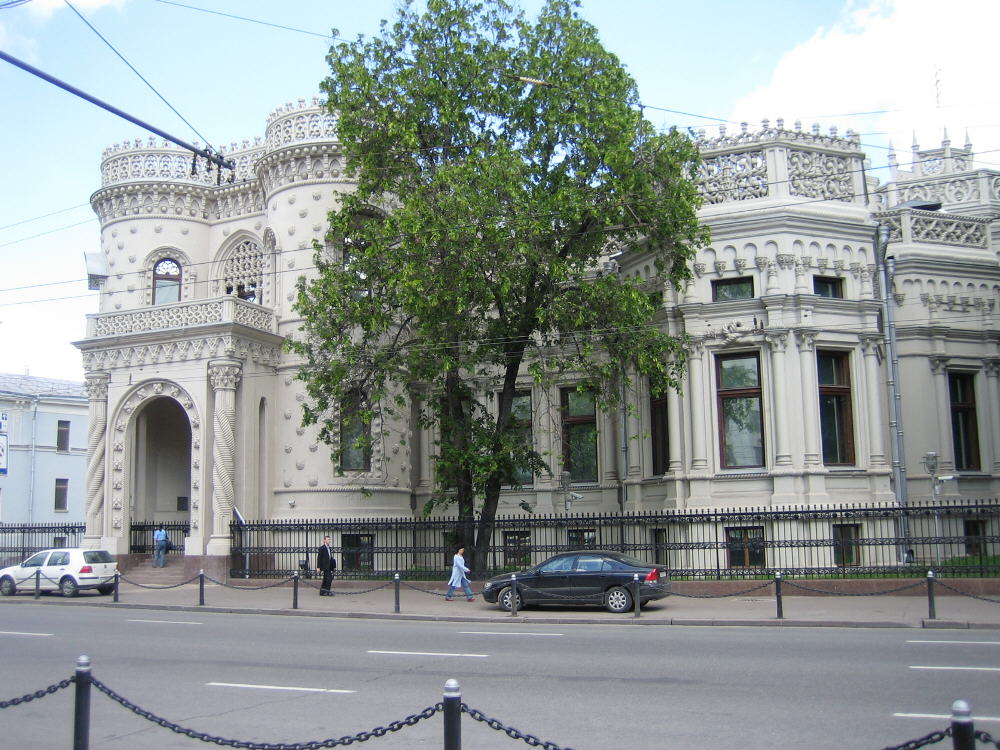
Facade, 2006

The Arseny Morozov House is a historic building located at 16 Vozdvizhenka Street, Moscow. It was designed by Viktor Mazyrin for his friend Arseny Morozov. The pair had toured around Portugal and been impressed by the Pena Palace in Sintra. An eclectic building with Neo-Manueline architecture, the Morozov House was constructed on the land presented to Arseny by his mother Varvara. Mazyrin built the house between 1895 and 1899.

According to the city legend, when she saw the finished mansion, Varvara Morozova exclaimed: "Only I used to know that you’re a fool, now the whole of Moscow will know!"

== The Soviet Period ==
Following the February Revolution, for a short period the building was one of the expensive residences occupied by the Moscow Federation of Anarchist Groups. In 1918-1928 the building was occupied by the Proletkult theatre group and staged experimental productions by famous Russian theater and film directors Sergei Eisenstein and Vsevolod Meyerhold.

The art theorist Aleksei Gan was amongst those who lived in the building. The building had Ivan Morozov's collection of ceramics, silverware, icons and engraved portraits. Gan spent a month as custodian of these objects.

At the end of the 1920s the house was managed by the Ministry of Foreign Affairs (Soviet Union). It was the residency of the Ambassador of Japan until 1940, the headquarters of a British newspaper, the Britansky Soyuznik (British Ally), in 1941-1945, and the Embassy of India from 1952 to 1954.
