= Aleksey Khludov =

Russian manuscript collector (1818–1882)

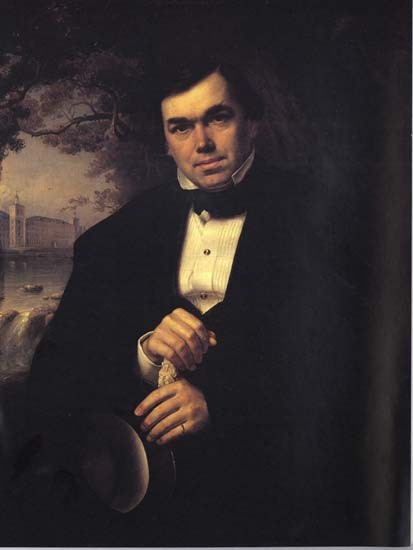
Aleksey Khludov (c.1861); by Nikolai Zavaruyev (d.1869)

Aleksey Ivanovich Khludov (23 August 1818 – 22 March 1882) was a Russian Old Believer merchant who amassed the richest private collection of early medieval manuscripts in Imperial Russia.

The son of a peasant, Khludov rose to become a man of considerable fortune and chairman of the Moscow stock exchange committee from 1859 to 1865. He specialized in early Russian, South Slavic, and Greek religious manuscripts, most of which he acquired from other Old Believer collectors. Unsurprisingly, his collection boasted the richest assortment of documents concerning the early history of the Raskol. In 1866, he donated forty manuscripts to the Rumyantsev Museum. The rest passed upon his death to the Nikolsky Old Believer Monastery.

After the October Revolution, the Bolsheviks expropriated the Khludov collection, including its gem—the 9th-century illuminated Khludov Psalter—and transferred 524 mediaeval manuscripts and 717 incunabula to the State Historical Museum, where they reside to this day.

== Family ==
His daughter Varvara Alekseevna Morozova married Abram Abramovich Morozov, grandson of Savva Vasilyevich Morozov, also an Old Believer who overcame his peasant origins to become a major industrialist in the textile industry.
