= Arseny Abramovich Morozov =

Russian dandy (1874–1908)

Arseny Abramovich Morozov (1874–1908) was a member of the Morozov dynasty. He had a reputation as a playboy.

== Family ==
He was the youngest son of Abram Abramovich Morozov and his wife Varvara Alekseevna Morozova. His eldest brother was Mikhail Abramovich Morozov, and Ivan Abramovich Morozov was his other elder brother. He married Vera Sergeevna Fedotova.

== Early life ==
He attended the 3rd Moscow Gymnasium before moving on to the Moscow Real School. Here he stayed on into the seventh year (1891-1892) in the mechanical and technical department. Then in 1893 he received training in England, before travelling across Europe. He went to the International Exposition at Antwerp in 1894. Here he met Viktor Mazyrin who was responsible for the Imperial Russian pavilion. Mazyrin had already been engaged by other members of the Morozov family, and Arseny told him that he was interested in having a mansion built in Moscow. The Neo-Manueline mansion, inspired in the Pena Palace in Sintra, was designed by Viktor Mazyrin for his friend Arseny Morozov after the pair have toured around Portugal.
