= Viktor Taratuta =

Russian revolutionary

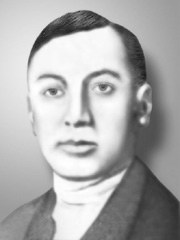

Viktor Konstantinovich Taratuta (Russian: Виктор Константинович Таратута) (16 April 1881 – 13 May 1926) was a Russian revolutionary and Soviet official.

== Early life ==
Viktor Taratuta was born in a middle-class family in Yelizavetgrad (Kropyvnytskyi) in the Kherson province of Ukraine. He was educated at a technical school in Odesa, became involved in revolutionary circles as a teenager, and joined the Russian Social Democratic Labour Party (RSDLP) in 1898. He was arrested for the first time in June 1898, at the age of 17, and spent five months in prison in Odesa, before being released because of his age, and placed under police supervision for two years. Rather than accept these conditions, he moved from city to city, initially within Ukraine. In 1901 was a member of the RSDLP committee in Yekaterinoslav (Dnipro). He was arrested again in 1902, and spent 18 months in prison, and a year in exile in Siberia. In August 1904, he escaped from exile in Siberia to Batumi, in Georgia, where he was recruited by Lev Kamenev to the Bolshevik faction of the RSDLP. He was arrested in spring 1905 and deported to the far north, but was released under an amnesty during the 1905 revolution, and settled in Moscow. In 1907, he was a delegate at the RSDLP Congress in London, where he was elected an alternate member of the Central Committee. Afterwards, he was co-opted onto the Bolshevik Centre, which acted as the Central Committee of the Bolsheviks faction.

== The Schmidt Inheritance ==
In 1906, a 23-year old named Nikolai Schmidt, a member of the hugely wealthy Morozov family of Moscow-based manufacturers, died in prison, probably by suicide, after being arrested for his role in the Moscow uprising. In his will, he left his money to the RSDLP, apparently intending that it should go to the party as a whole, rather than its Bolshevik or Menshevik factions. Taratuta was assigned by the Bolshevik leader Vladimir Lenin to secure the inheritance, which he did by courting and living with Schmidt's 19-year-old sister, Yekaterina (1887–1937) - though his status as a wanted revolutionary prevented them from marrying. She therefore entered into a fictitious marriage with a Bolshevik named Ignatiev, which enabled her to get control of her share of the inheritance, which she handed over to the Bolsheviks.

The dead man also had a 15 years brother, Aleksey, who met Lenin and Taratuta in Vyborg with his lawyers. According to one witness, the negotiations were going calmly until Taratuta suddenly threatened death on anyone who came between the Bolsheviks and the inheritance. The youth waived his claim on the money.

The affair created a scandal in revolutionary circles, not least because Taratuta was not popular or trusted. The leader of the Moscow Bolsheviks, Rosalia Zemlyachka accused him of being a police agent. This accusation was investigated by Vladimir Burtsev, the RSDLP's specialist in exposing police agents, who concluded that he was a scoundrel, but not a spy. When other revolutionaries complained to Lenin about Taratuta's questionable character, he reputedly laughed and replied:

That is exactly why he is useful to us. Precisely because he will stop at nothing. Now tell me frankly, would you consent to be a gigolo? To live with a Moscow Heiress for her money? You would not! Neither could I bring myself to do it. But Viktor did, and therefore he is a very useful man and cannot be replaced.

== Later career ==
Taratuta emigrated in summer 1908, where Lenin appointed him secretary of the Bolsheviks' Foreign Bureau, and to France in 1909, where he joined the French Socialist Party. He returned to Russia in 1919, and ran the French section of Comintern. In 1921, he transferred to economic work. From 1924 until his death, he was head of the USSR Bank of Foreign Trade.
