= Novaya Zhizn =

Bolshevik daily newspaper

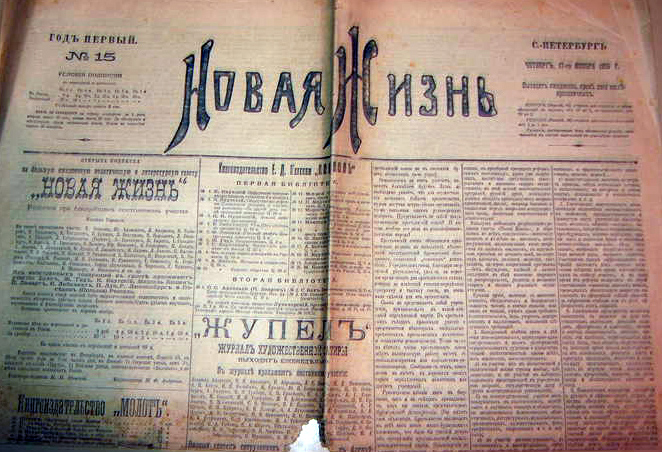
Novaya Zhizn (1905)

Novaya Zhizn (Russian: Новая Жизнь, lit. 'New Life') was the first legal Bolshevik daily newspaper. It was founded by Alexander Bogdanov and its first editor was Nikolai Minsky. It was first published in October 1905 in Petersburg, under the guidance of Lenin. It was published until December 1905.

The paper was funded by Nikolai Pavlovich Schmidt and Savva Morozov.

== See also ==
- Iskra
