= Maria Feodorovna Morozova =

Russian merchant and entrepreneur, philanthropist

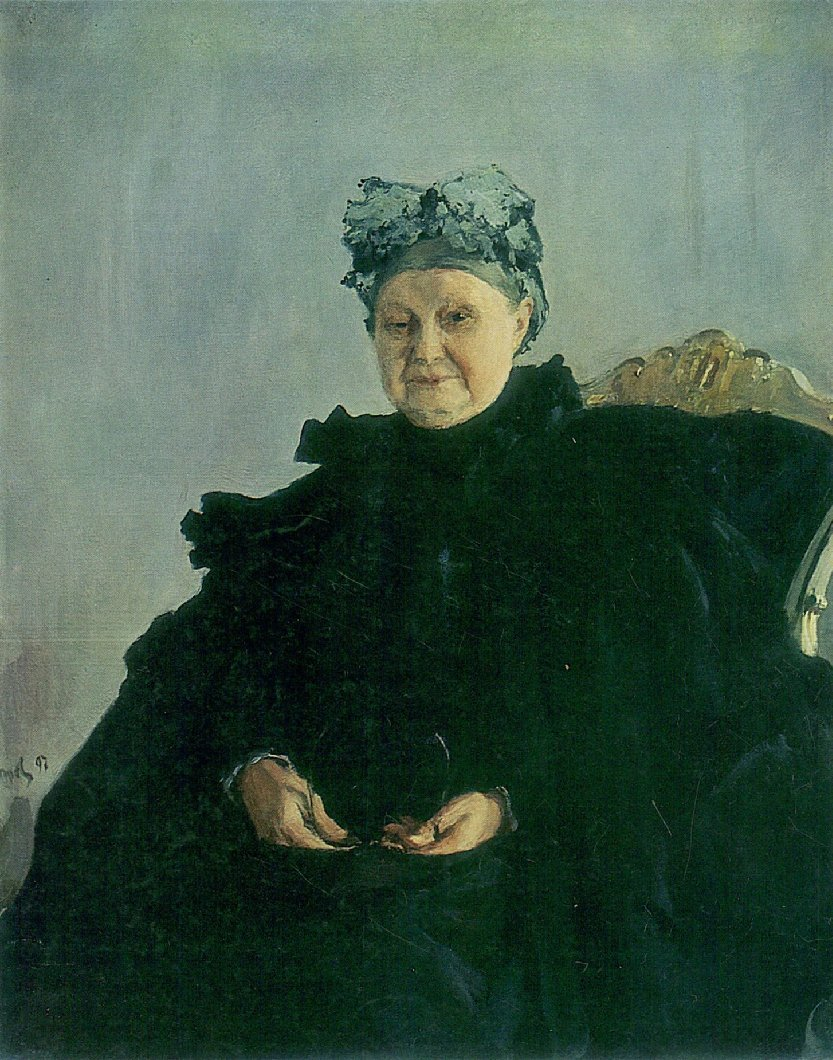
Maria Fyodorovna Morozova

Maria Fyodorovna Morozova (Russian: Мария Фёдоровна Морозова; 1830–1911) was a Russian entrepreneur. She was the daughter of merchant Fyodor Simonov, married to merchant Timofei Savvich Morozov and mother of merchant Savva Morozov. She was the sister-in-law of Varvara Alekseevna Morozova, also an entrepreneur and philanthropist. She was a leading member of Morozov dynasty part of the Russian merchant elite. She was known for her influence in society. She was awarded for her efforts within the Office of the Institutions of Empress Maria.
