= Morozovs =

Family of Old Believer industrialists in Russia

The Morozovs (Russian: Морозовы) is a famous Old Believers Russian family of merchants and entrepreneurs. The family name Morozov originates from a Russian word moroz (мороз) that means frost. The founder of the family was Savva Vasilyevich Morozov (1770–1862). He had five sons and a daughter, Varvara Savvichna Morozova.

The merchant family of Morozovs should not be confused with another famous Old Believer: boyarynya Feodosiya Morozova (and her family). The latter were boyars, whereas almost all the other famous Morozovs were merchants, and also descendants of peasants.

== Five sons ==
Savva Vasilyevich's sons were all involved in his business:

- Elisei Savvich Morozov (1798-1868)
- Zhakar Savvich Morozov (1802–1857)
- Abram Savvich Morozov (1806–1856)
- Ivan Savvich Morozov (1810–1864)
- Timofei Savvich Morozov (1823–1889)

== The four branches ==
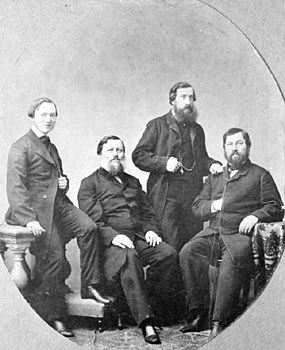
Abram Abramovich Morozov, Timofei Savvich Morozov, Ivan Zakharovich, Vikula Eliseevich Morozov in the mid 1860s

The family business was divided into four in 1871.

- Zakharovichi: Ivan Zakharovich Morozov, (Bogorodsk-Glukhovo factory)
- Abramovichi: Abram Abramovich Morozov, (Tver Manufactory)
- Vikulovichi: Vikul Eliseevich Morozov, (Nikolskoye Manufactory)
- Timofeevichi: Timofei Savvich Morozo, (Nikolskaya Manufactory)

=== Zakharovichi ===
- Ivan Zakharovich Morozov (1823-1888)

- Arseny Ivanovich Morozov - creator of the choir of znamennoe singing.

=== Abramovichi ===
- Abram Abramovich Morozov (1839—1882)
- Varvara Alekseevna Morozova (1848-1917) wife of Abram Abramovich Morozov

- Mikhail Abramovich Morozov (1870-1903), eldest son
- Ivan Morozov (1871–1921), second son was a Russian businessman and from 1907 to 1914 a major collector of avant-garde French art.
- Arseny Abramovich Morozov (1874-1908), youngest son

=== Vikulovichi ===
- Vikul Eliseevich Morozov (1829-1894)

- Michael Vikulovich Morozov (1857-1934), son
- Vera Vikulovna Morozova (1858-1916), daughter and mother of Nikolai Pavlovich Schmidt, Bolshevik supporter
- Ivan Vikulovich Morozov (1865-1933), son
- Varvara Alexandrona Morozova, wife of Ivan

- Olgaa Ivanovna Morozova (1897-?)
- Vera Ivanovna Morozova (1900-?)

=== Timofeevichi ===
- Timofei Savvich Morozov (1823-1889)
- Maria Feodorovna Morozova (1830–1911) wife of Timofei Savvich Morozov

- Yulia Timofeevna Krestovnikova (1858–1905), daughter
- Savva Timofeyevich Morozov (1862–1905), son, an entrepreneur, patron of art and of Russian revolutionary movement; sponsor of the Moscow Art Theatre, Bolshevik supporter
- Sergei Timofeevich Morozov (1863–1944), son, an entrepreneur,

== See also ==
- Morozov (surname)
