= Ballerina Posing for a Photographer =

Painting by Edgard Degas

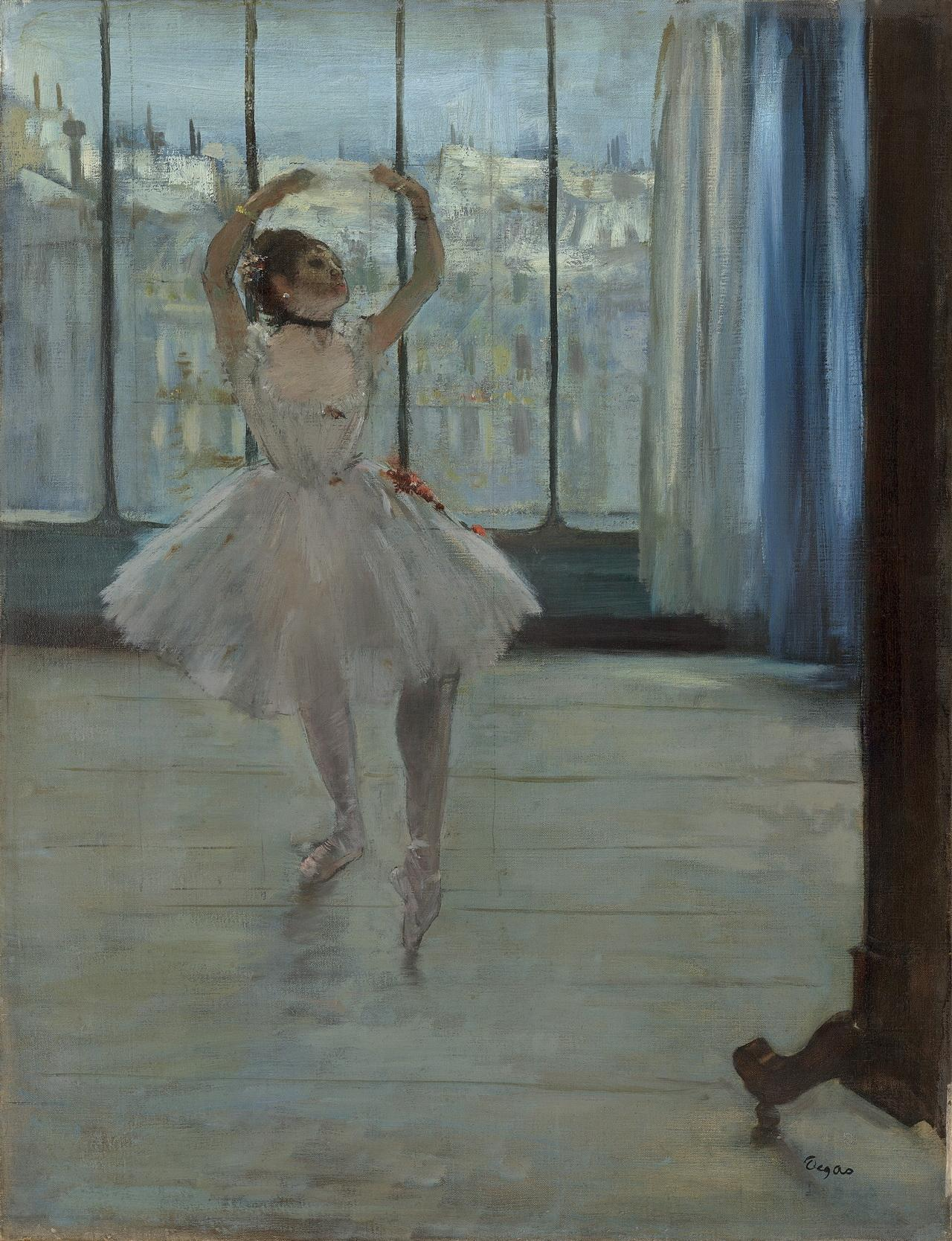
- Artist: Edgar Degas
- Year: 1875
- Medium: Oil on canvas
- Dimensions: 65 cm × 50 cm (26 in × 20 in)
- Location: Pushkin Museum, Moscow

Ballerina Posing for a Photographer is an oil on canvas painting executed in 1875 by the French artist Edgar Degas. It depicts a young ballet dancer posing in front of a standing mirror; in the background, through a large window, is seen an elevated view of the walls of the houses opposite and the snow-covered rooftops of Paris. It is held in the Pushkin Museum, in Moscow.

== Description ==
In this work, Degas's relentless eye captures a sparsely furnished interior with a ballerina standing on a grayish wooden floor as the object of his attention. She is not displaying herself for an audience, but for a photographer who came to immortalize her in her work: therefore, she is looking for a nice position with the help of a mirror. As in other works by Degas, the dancer's gesture is not taken at the intense moment of an artistic performance, but when her limbs, exhausted, assume a strangely deformed, almost grotesque aspect.

== Provenance ==
The painting was first exhibited in London in the spring of 1875. It was sold by Durand-Ruel in 1902 to the Russian collector Sergei Shchukin for 35,000 francs, who displayed his extensive private collection to the public at his palace in 1909. After the Revolution in 1917, Shchukin left Russia and his collection was nationalized and his palace became a museum. In 1923 the collection was merged with that of Ivan Morozov. In 1948, they were divided between Moscow and Leningrad (Saint Petersburg) and the Degas piece ended up in the Pushkin Museum.

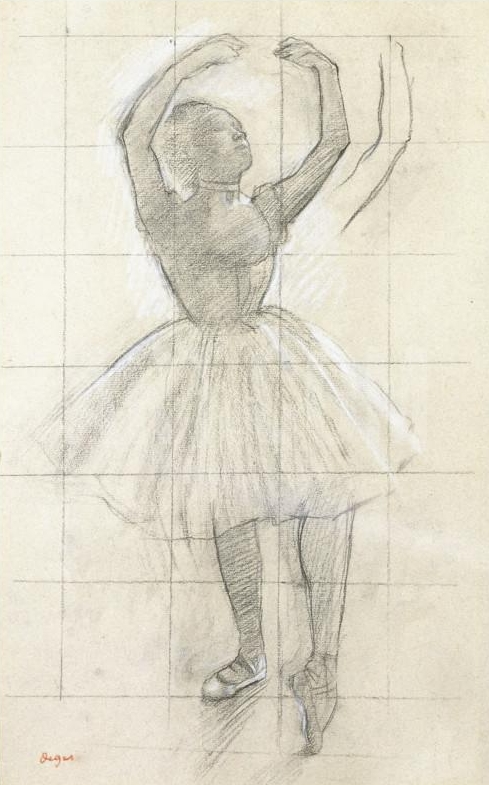
Preparatory drawing
