= Ivan Morozov (entrepreneur) =

Russian businessman (1865–1933)

Ivan Vikulovich Morozov (Russian: Ива́н Вику́лович Моро́зов; 28 August 1865, Moscow - 2 November 1933) was Russian business person active in the later period of the Russian Empire. He was part of the influential Old Believer family, the Morozovs.

He was the son of Vikul Eliseevich Morozov.
