= Chludov Psalter =

9th-century illuminated manuscript

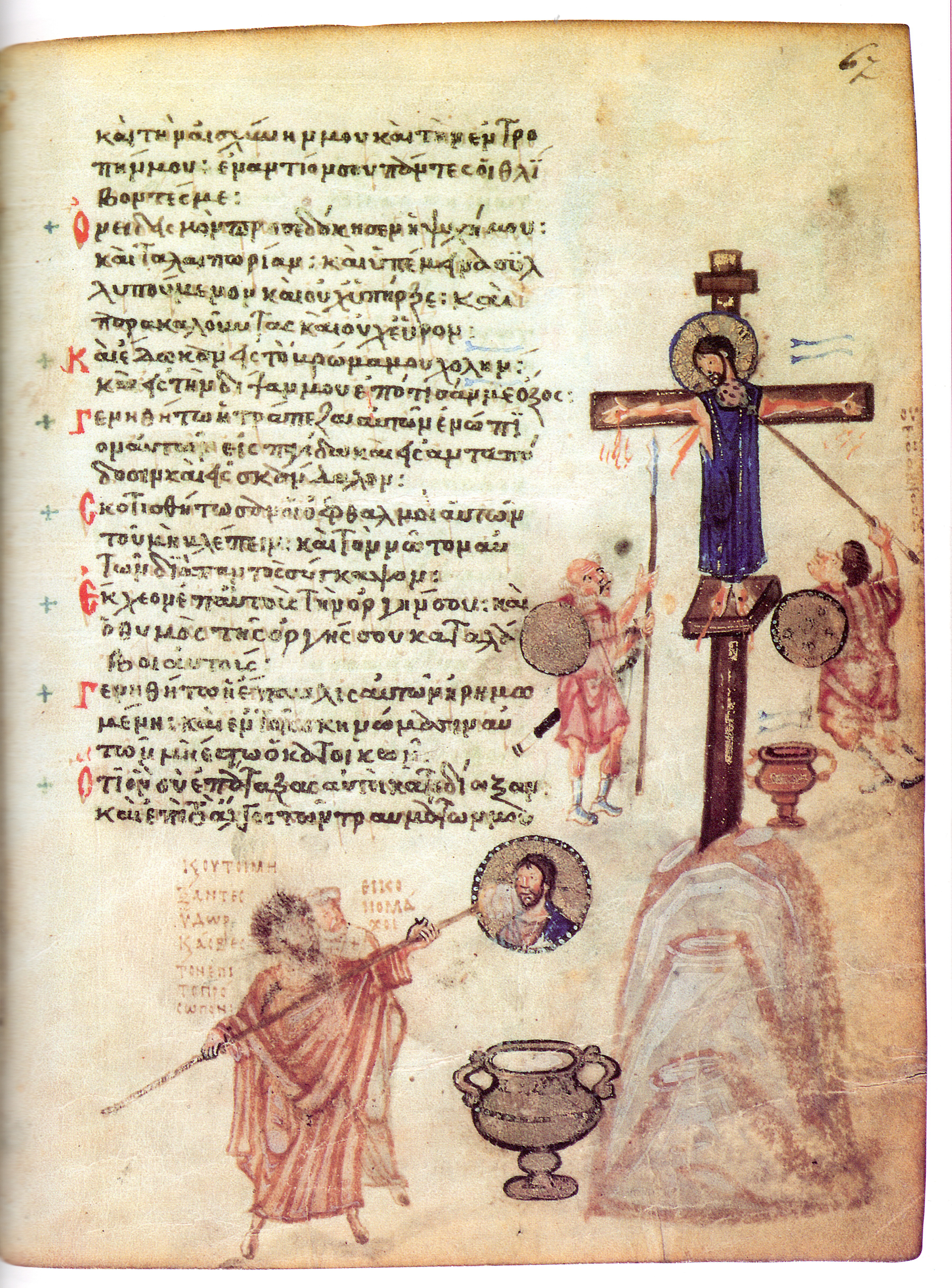
The worn state of many pages is evidence of continuous use throughout centuries.

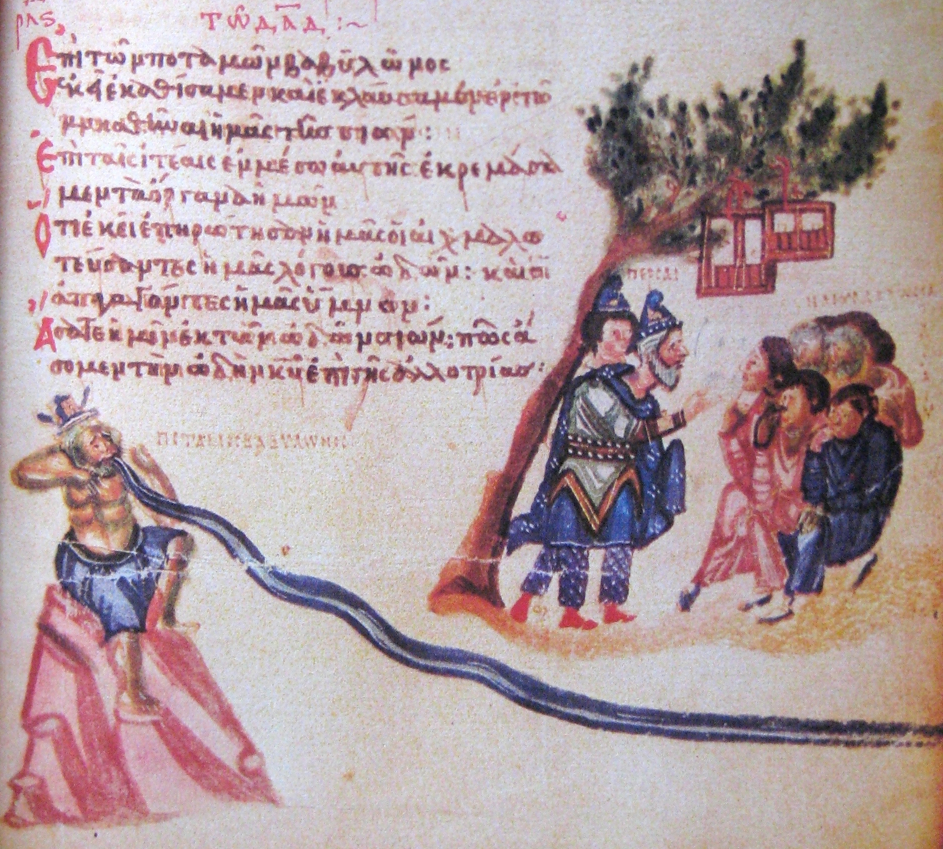
The Rivers of Babylon (Psalm 137)

The Chludov Psalter (Russian: Хлудовская псалтырь; Moscow, Hist. Mus. MS. D.129) is an illuminated marginal Psalter dating to the mid-9th century. It is a unique monument of Byzantine art at the time of the Iconoclasm, one of only three illuminated Byzantine Psalters to survive from the 9th century.

According to one tradition, the miniatures are supposed to have been created clandestinely, and many of them are directed against Iconoclasts. Many contain explanations of the drawings written next to them, and little arrows point out from the main text to the illustration, to show which line the picture refers to. The polemical style of the whole ensemble is highly unusual, and a demonstration of the furious passions the Iconoclast dispute generated.

The psalter measures 195 mm by 150 mm and contains only 169 folios. The outer edges of the pages are normally left blank in order to be covered with illustrations. The text and captions were written in a diminutive uncial script, but many of these were rewritten in crude minuscule about three centuries later. The book contains the Psalms in the arrangement of the Septuagint, and the responses to be chanted during their recitation, which follow the Liturgy of Hagia Sophia, the Imperial church in Constantinople.

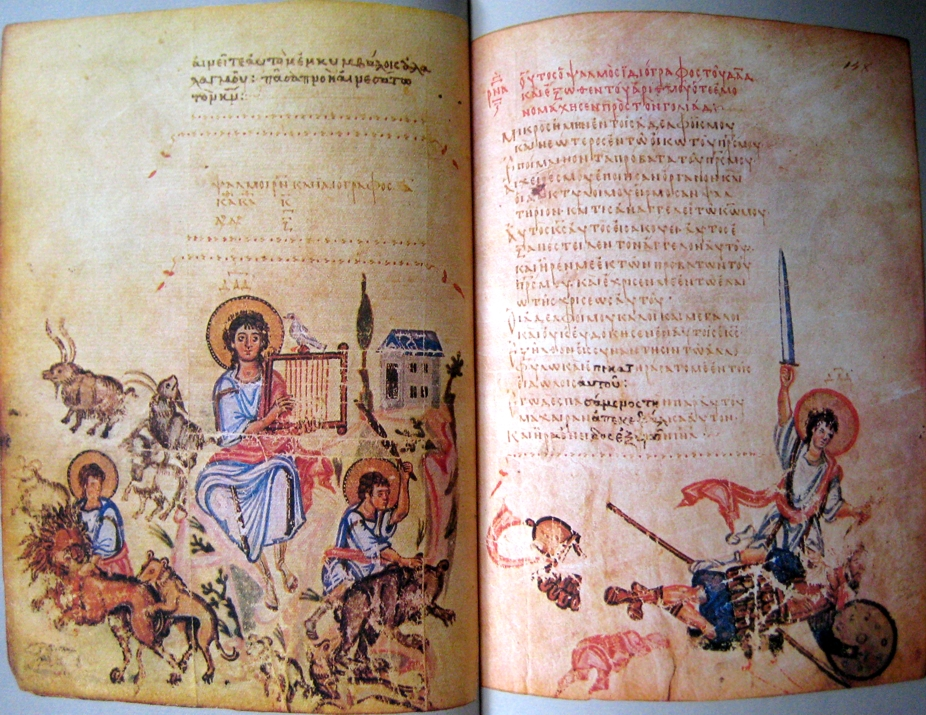

In the illustration to the right, the miniaturist illustrated the line "They gave me gall to eat; and when I was thirsty they gave me vinegar to drink" with a picture of a soldier offering Christ vinegar on a sponge attached to a pole. Below is a picture of the last Iconoclast Patriarch of Constantinople, John the Grammarian rubbing out a painting of Christ with a similar sponge attached to a pole. John is caricatured, here as on other pages, with untidy straight hair sticking out in all directions, which was considered ridiculous by the elegant Byzantines.

Nikodim Kondakov hypothesized that the psalter was created in the famous monastery of St John the Studite in Constantinople. Other scholars believe that the liturgical responses it contains were only used in Hagia Sophia, and that it was therefore a product of the Imperial workshops in Constantinople, soon after the return of the Iconophiles to power in 843.

It was kept at Mount Athos until 1847, when a Russian scholar stole it and brought it to Moscow. The psalter was then acquired by Aleksey Khludov, whose name it bears today. It passed as part of the Khludov bequest to the Nikolsky Old Believer Monastery and then to the State Historical Museum.
