= Timofei Savvich Morozov =

Russian businessman (1823–1889)

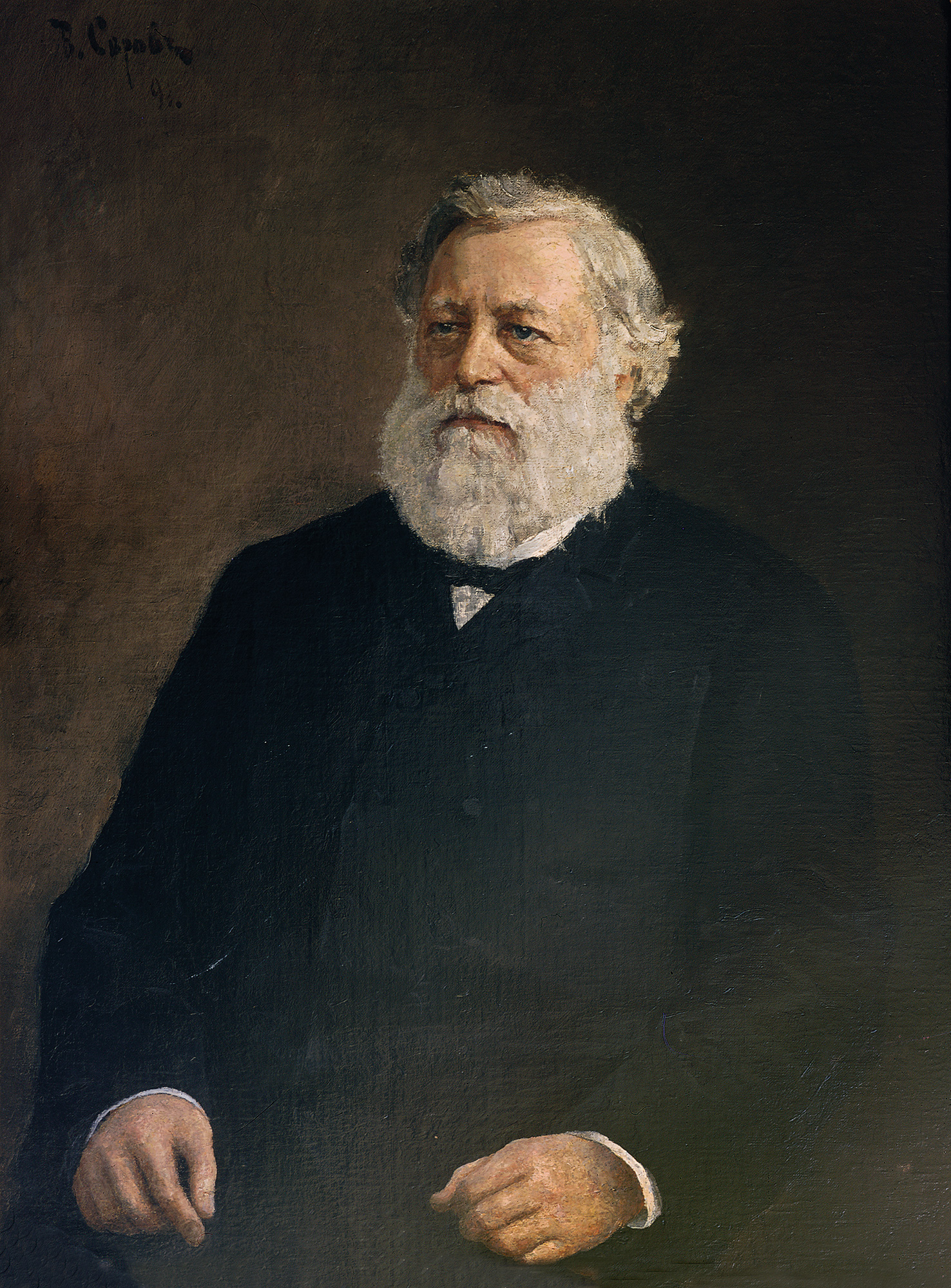
- Timofei Savvich Morozov by Valentin Serov
- Born: January 23, 1823; Moscow, Russian Empire
- Died: October 10, 1889 (aged 66)
- Occupation(s): Businessperson, entrepreneur, politician
- Known for: Entrepreneur who attended the Russian Technical Society
- Spouse: Maria Feodorovna Simonova (m. 1846)
- Children: 6
- Family: Morozovs

Timofei Savvich Morozov (23 January 1823, Moscow - 10 October 1889) was Russian business person active in the later period of the Russian Empire. He was part of the influential Old Believer family, the Morozovs, the son of Savva Vasilyevich Morozov. He was appointed head of the Moscow City Duma in 1866.

Timofei was one of a small number of entrepreneurs who used to attend meetings of the Russian Technical Society.

== Family ==
Timofei married Maria Feodorovna Simonova in 1846. Together they had six children:

- Anna Timofeyevna Morozova Karpova (1849–1924), married the historian Gennady Fedorovich Karpov
- Ivan Timofeyevich Morozov (1855–1858), child death
- Arseny Timofeyevich Morozov (1857–1858), child death
- Yulia Timofeyevna Krestovnikova (1858–1920), married the industrialist, Grigory Aleksandrovich Krestovnikov
- Sergey Timofeevich Morozov (1860–1944)
- Savva Timofeyevich Morozov (1862–1905)
