= Ivan Savvich Morozov =

Russian entrepreneur (1810–1864)

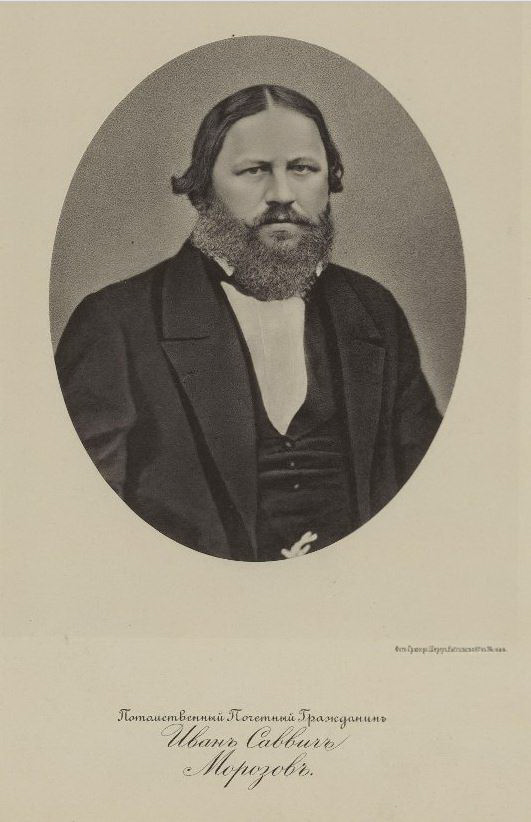
Ivan Savvich Morozov

Ivan Savvich Morozov (21 July, 1810–19 October, 1864, Tver, Russian: Иван Саввич Морозов) was a Russian entrepreneur who took part in the creation of the Tver Manufactory. He was the son of Savva Vasilyevich Morozov, but unlike his brothers is not recognised as founding any of the Morozov companies.

Ivan was born unfree as a serf. His father bought his freedom along with that of himself and his elder brothers, Elisei Savvich Morozov, Zhakar Savvich Morozov and Abram Savvich Morozov in 1820.
