= Savva Morozov =

Russian textile magnate and philanthropist (1862–1905)

- Савва Морозов
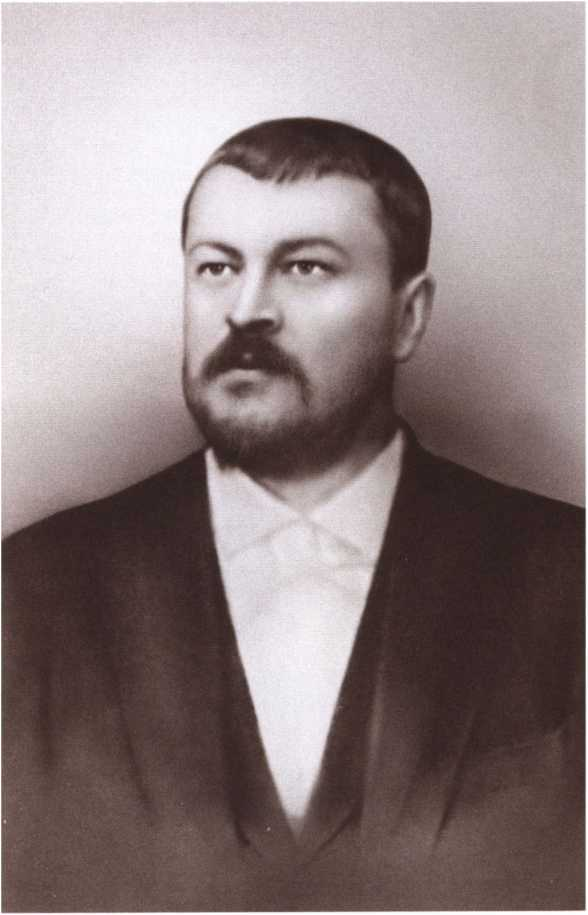
- Born: Savva Timofeyevich Morozov; 15 February [O.S. 3 February] 1862; Orekhovo-Zuevo, Bogorodsky Uyezd, Moscow Governorate, Russian Empire
- Died: 26 May [O.S. 13 May] 1905; Cannes, France
- Occupation: Entrepreneur
- Spouse: Zinaida Grigorievna
- Family: Morozovs

Savva Timofeyevich Morozov (Russian: Са́вва Тимофе́евич Моро́зов, 15 February [O.S. 3 February] 1862 – 26 May [O.S. 13 May] 1905) was a Russian textile magnate and philanthropist. Established by Savva Vasilyevich Morozov (1770–1862), the Morozov family was the fifth-richest in Russia at the beginning of the 20th century.

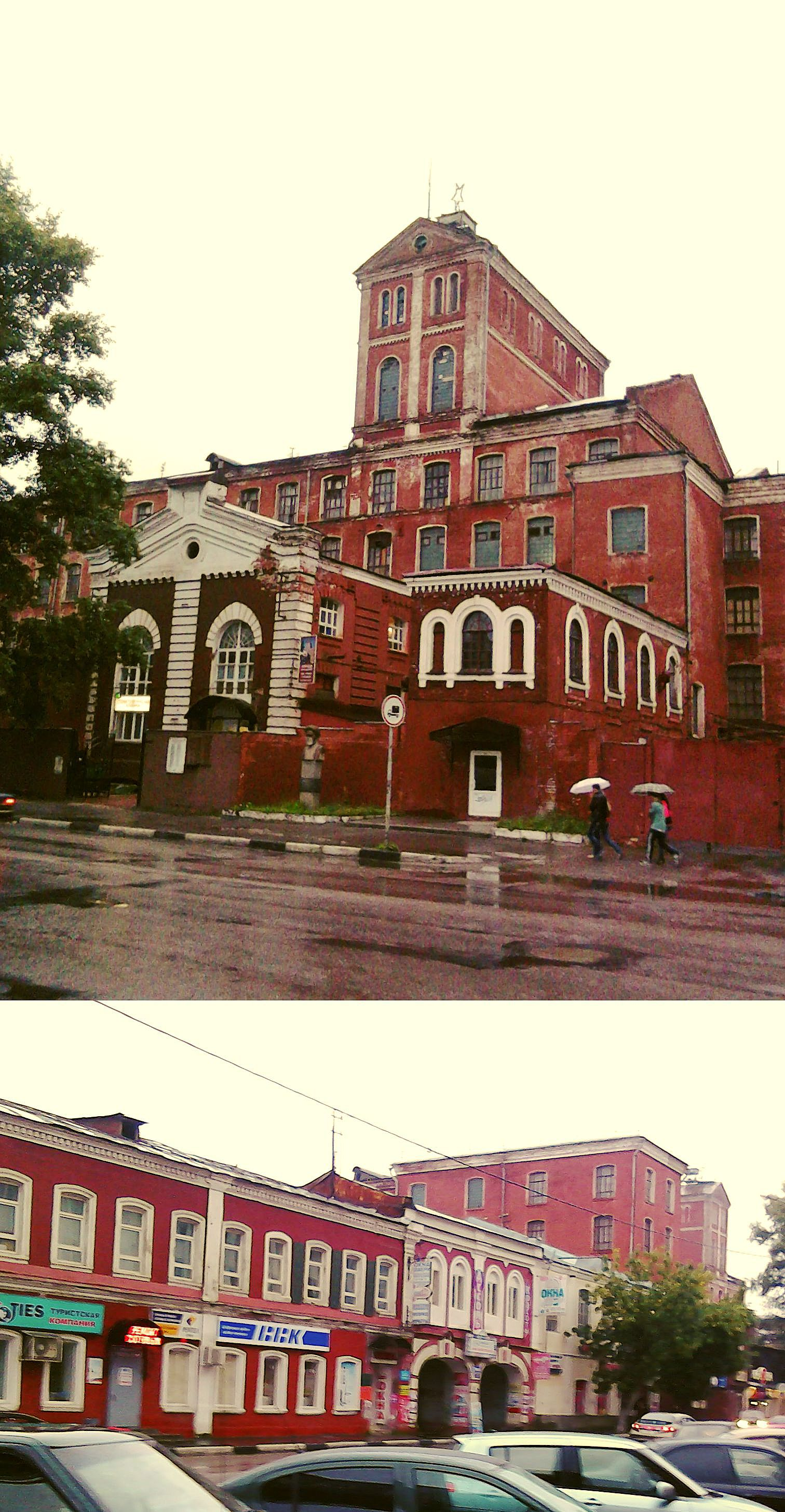
An old Morozov factory building in Zuyevo along ulitsa Lenina

== Biography ==
Savva Timofeyevich Morozov came from an Old Believer merchant family which held the hereditary civil rank of honorary citizens (Russian: Почётные граждане). His father was Timofei Savvich Morozov, his mother Maria Feodorovna Morozova. This gave him freedom from conscription, freedom from corporal punishment, and freedom from taxation (Russian: Подушный оклад). (Note: Before the introduction of income-tax levies in the twentieth century, the Tsarist autocracy levied a poll tax censuses to finance the Imperial Russian Army.) He grew up at the Morozov house at Trehsvyatitelskaya Lane 1-3c1 (Russian: Большой Трёхсвятительский переулок) on Ivanovo Hill (Russian: Ивановская горка) in the White City (Russian: Белый город), now the boulevards, of Moscow. He attended the nearby gymnasium at Pokrovsky Gates. His family home was the most expensive home in Moscow and its Morozov gardens (Russian: Морозовский сад) became a favourite haunt of Sergey Aksakov, F. Dostoevsky, A. Ostrovsky, L. Tolstoy, and P. Tchaikovsky. He later studied physics and mathematics at Moscow University (1885) where he wrote a study on dye and met Mendeleev. Beginning on 7 January 1885, at 10 o'clock in the morning, textile workers at the Morozov factories in Bogorodsk, especially Orekhovo-Zuyevo, went on strike for several weeks (Morozov strike). In 1885–1887 he studied chemistry at the University of Cambridge in the United Kingdom. While in England he studied the structure of the textile industry in Great Britain, especially in Manchester.

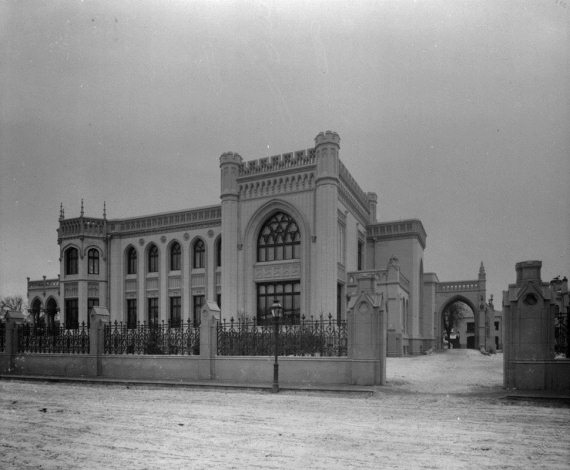
Savva Morozov House, Spiridonovka Street, built in 1893

Savva Morozov married his second-cousin's former wife Zinaida Grigorievna, née Zimin (Russian: Зинаида Григорьевна Зимина). (Note: Zinaida's first husband was Sergei Vikulovich Morozov (Russian: Сергей Викулович Морозов), the third son of Savva's first cousin Vikula Eliseevich Morozov (Russian: Викула Елисеевич Морозов, 1860-1921).) They hosted lavish parties and balls which many distinguished Russians and Moscovites attended including Savva Mamontov, Botkin, Feodor Chaliapin, Maxim Gorky, Anton Chekhov, Konstantin Stanislavski, Pyotr Boborykin, and others. Olga Knipper recalled one of these balls: "I had to go to the ball at Morozova: I've never seen such luxury and wealth."

At the beginning of the twentieth century, Morozov was the largest shareholder of the Moscow Art Theatre (MAT) under Stanislavski and Nemirovich-Danchenko. During the summer of 1902, with participation of both Ivan Fomin and Alexander Galetsky, Savva funded Schechtel's improvements to the Lianozov-owned (Note: The Lianozovs were caviar- and fish-magnates with exclusive rights from Persia to the fisheries of the southern Caspian Sea. Later, after the founding of Baku Oil in 1907, the Lianozov family were the 23rd-richest family in Russia before World War I.) theatre built in 1890 at Kamergersky Lane 3 in Tverskoy. The renovations incorporated Anna Golubkina's high-relief plaster of The Wave above the right entrance of the theatre. In 1903 he funded the electrification of the theatre with its own electrical power station, and added another small stage which is isolated from the main building to allow full rehearsals during performances on the main stage. All of this made the MAT the most advanced theatre in Russia. For the fifth and sixth seasons (1902–04), Morozov funded the entire cost of the equipment and the operating costs of the building, too. This new theatre had seating for 1200 (a third more than the older building) and greatly enhanced MAT's profitability. However, the rent increased for the seventh season (1904–05) and Morozov ceased paying for the leasehold and the operating cost. He would only pay back the principal for the cost of the improvements, which took 9 years. When Gorky's Summerfolk was not well received by Nemirovich-Danchenko and Stanislavski, Gorky left the theatre and Morozov followed.

Influenced by Maxim Gorky, Morozov and his relative Nikolai Pavlovich Schmidt (Note: Schmidt was the son of Pavel Alexandrovich Schmidt (Russian: Павел Александрович Шмит) and of Savva's sister, Vera Vikulovna Morozova (Russian: Вера Викуловна Морозова).) were significant financial contributors to the Bolshevik faction of the Russian Social Democratic Workers Party, including making payments to the newspaper Iskra.

According to the author Suzanne Massie, writing in Land of the Firebird, Morozov had approached his mother and family matriarch about introducing profit-sharing with factory workers - one of the first industrialists to propose such an idea. His mother angrily removed Savva from the family business, and one month later the apparently despondent Morozov shot himself while in the south of France. Morozov died from a gunshot wound in Cannes, France. His death was officially ruled a suicide but various murder theories exist. (Note: Yuri Felshtinsky identifies Leonid Krasin as the most likely assassin of Morozov.)

== Gallery ==
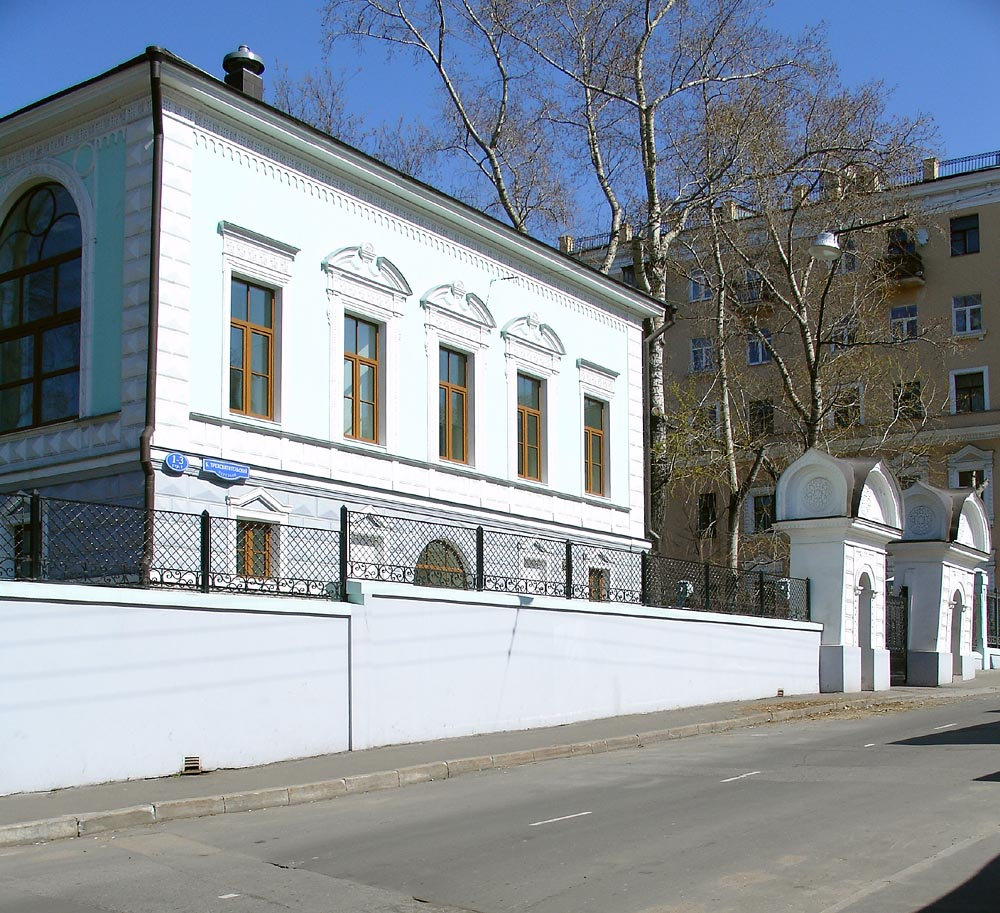
Morozov house at Trehsvyatitelskaya Lane 1-3c1

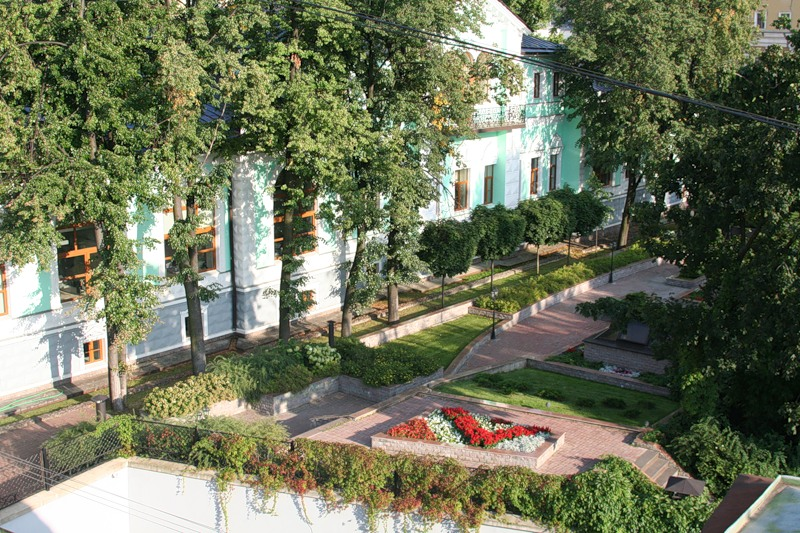
Morozov house from the garden

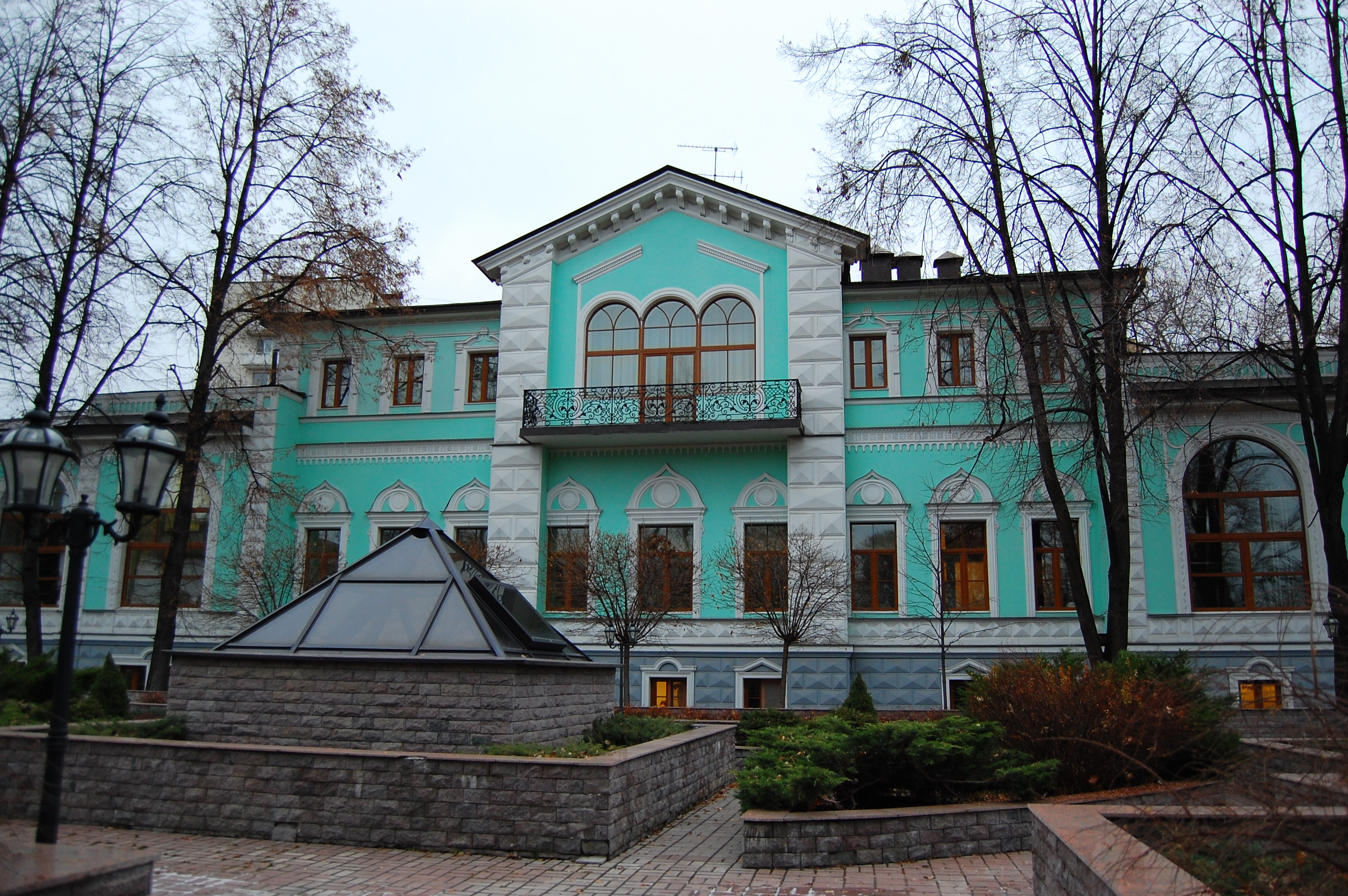
Another view of Morozov house

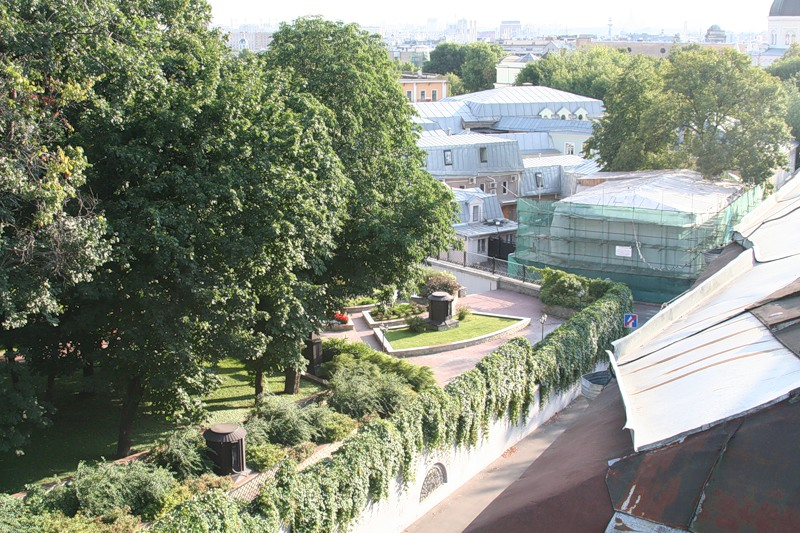
View of the Morozov gardens from the Ukraintseva Chamber (Russian: Палаты Украинцева)

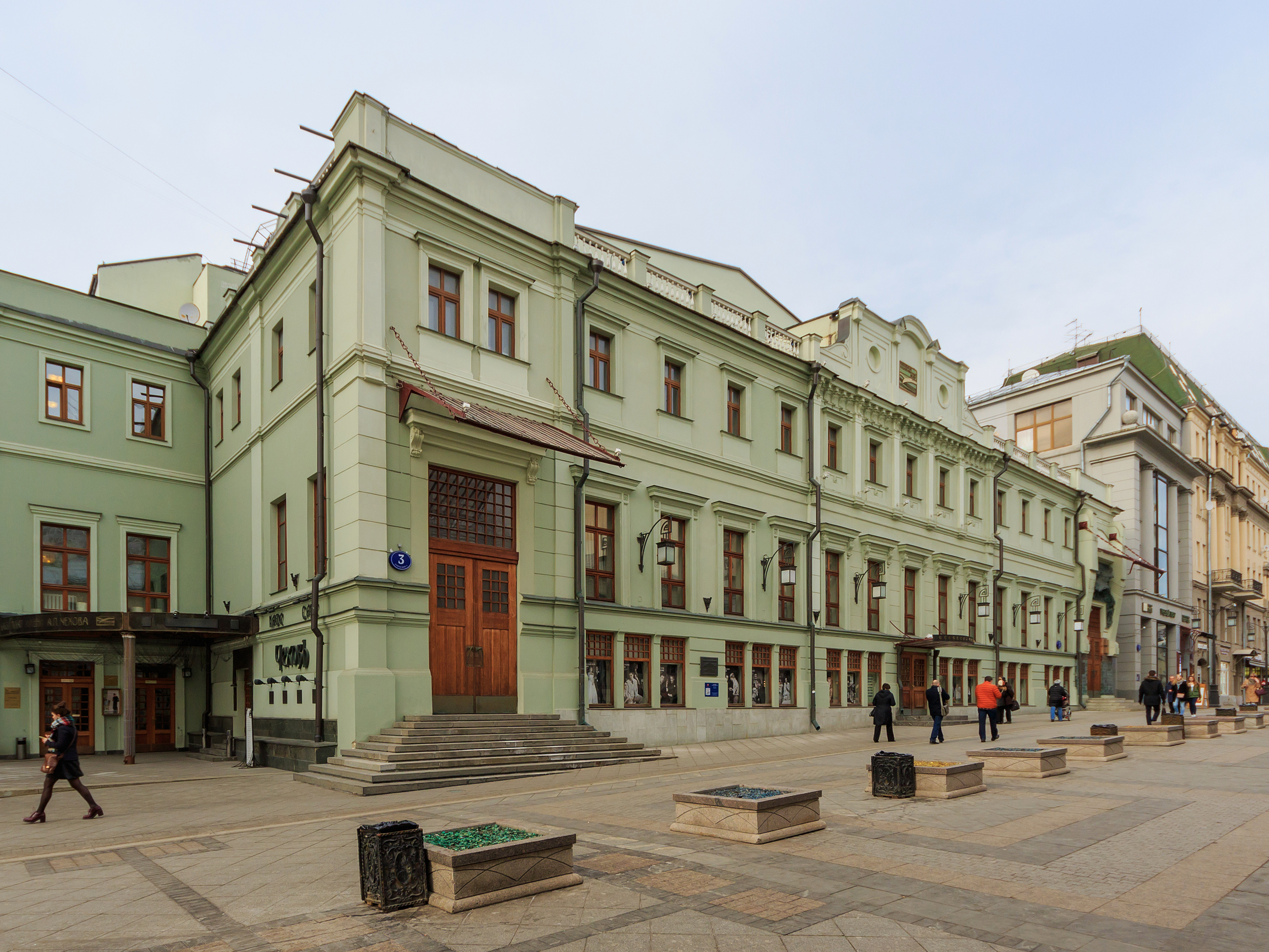
The Moscow Art Theatre, Kamergersky Lane 3, with exterior by Fyodor Schechtel

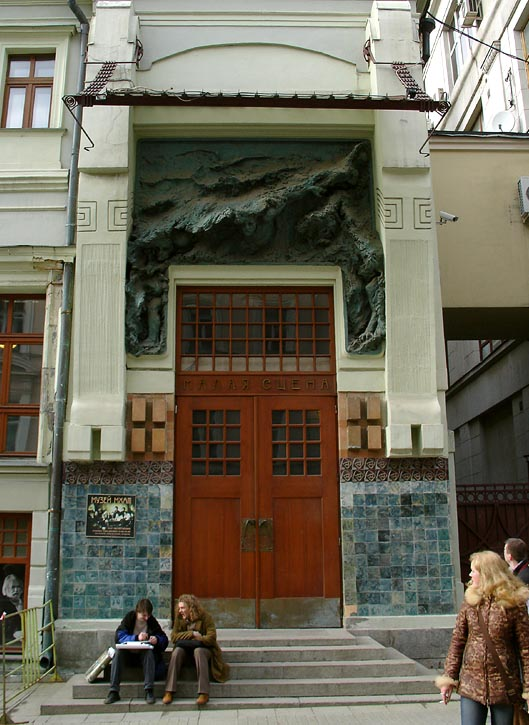
Anna Golubkina's The Wave on Kamergersky Lane above the right entrance of the Moscow Art Theatre
