= Viktor Mazyrin =

Russian architect (1859–1919)

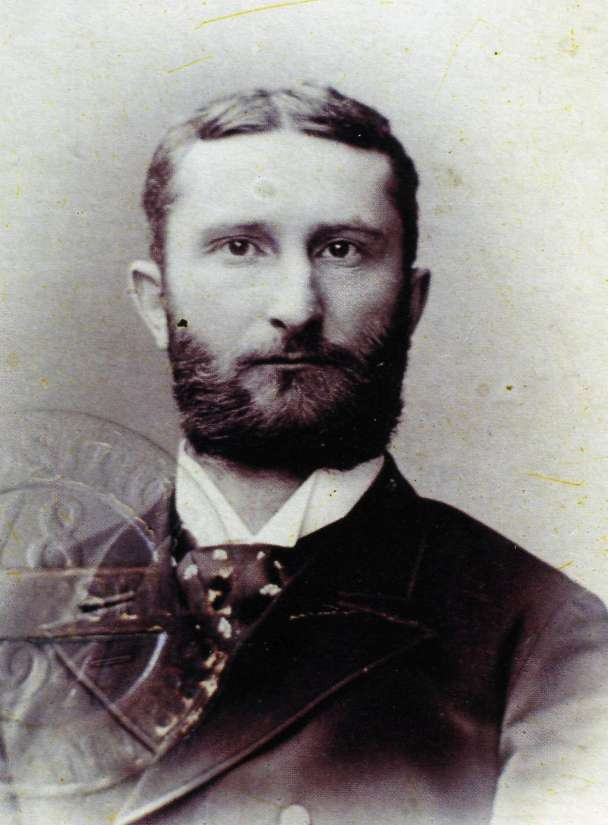
Viktor Mazyrin in the 1900s

Viktor Aleksandrovich Mazyrin (30 May 1859, Alatyr – 1919, Moscow) was a Russian architect.

His father, a military doctor, died when Viktor was quite young.

He built several buildings for the Morozov family.

Mazyrin died of typhoid fever in 1919, and was buried in Moscow at the Pyatnitskoye Cemetery.

== Gallery ==
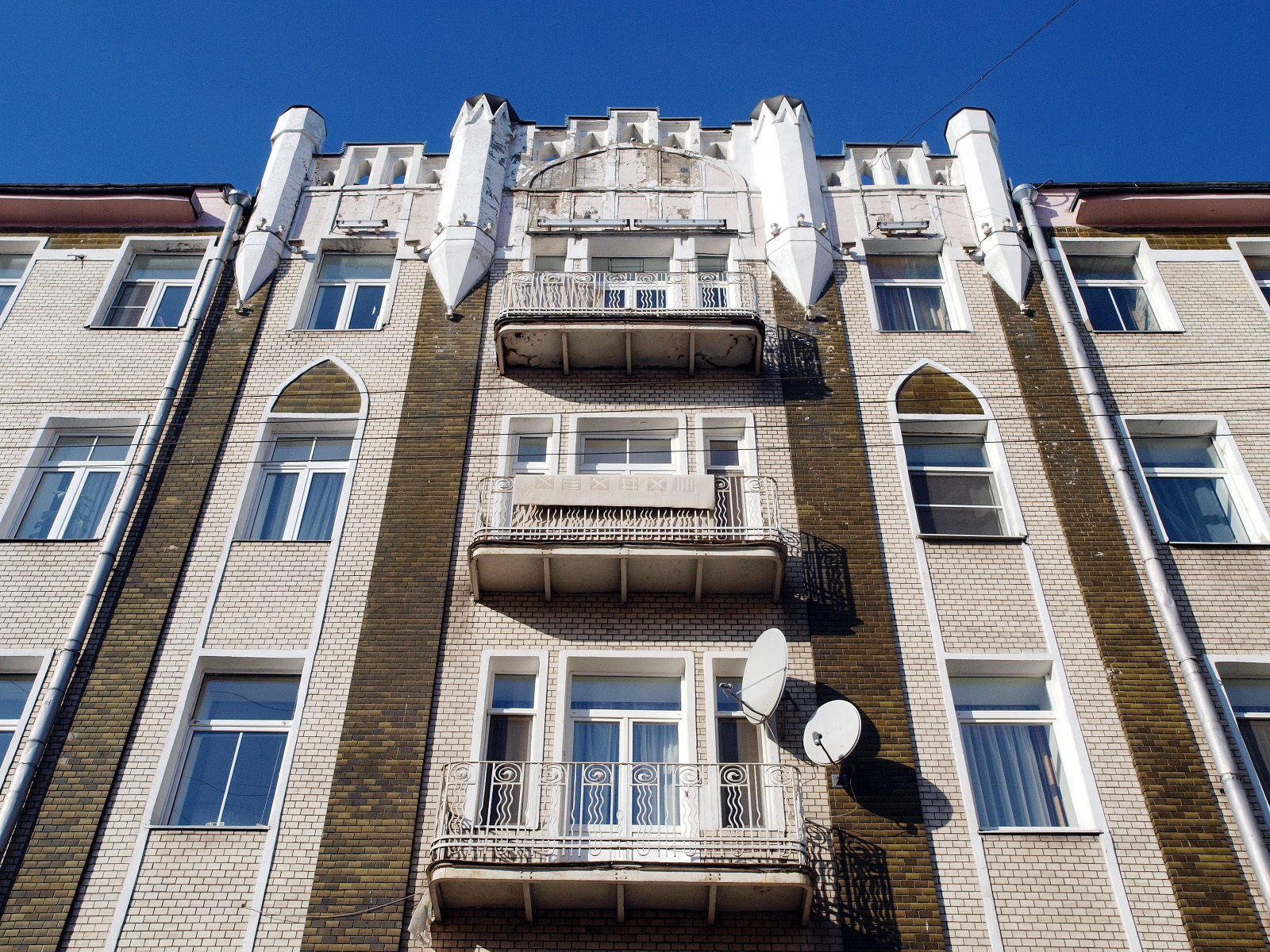
Mashkova Street
