= Nikolai Pavlovich Schmidt =

Russian revolutionary

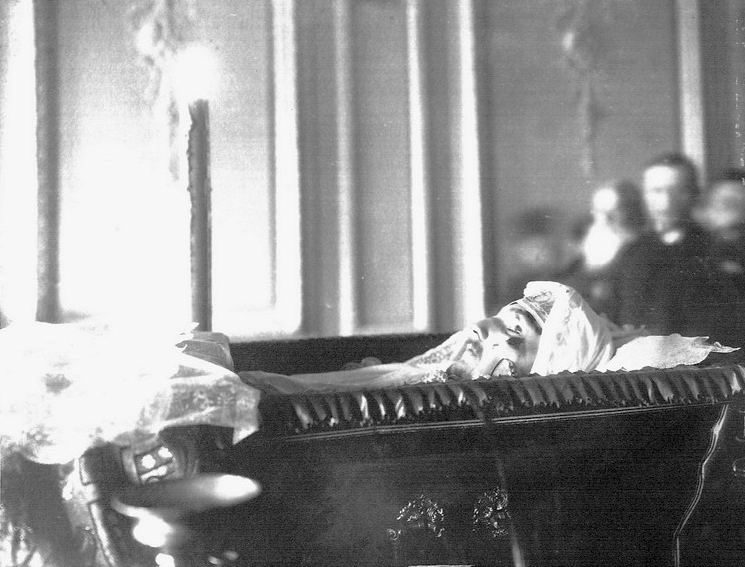
The body of Nikolai Pavlovich Schmidt on display after his death

Nikolai Pavlovich Schmidt (Russian: Николай Павлович Шмит; 22 December 1883 – 26 February 1907) was a Russian revolutionary aligned with the Bolsheviks. He was arrested in October 1905 during the 1905 Revolution. He apparently committed suicide in suspicious circumstances whilst in prison expecting imminent release. Others researchers claimed that he was intentionally killed. Before that he was tortured in order to obtain self-evidence against him on his role in 1905 Revolution.

Schmidt was related through his mother to Savva Morozov. His father Pavel Aleksandrovich Schmidt married Vera Vikulovna Morozova, the heiress of a rich Old Believer family. Both he and his uncle were sympathetic to the Bolsheviks and provided funds for their newspaper, Novaya Zhizn.

== The Schmidt Inheritance ==
In 1906, Nikolai Schmidt died in prison, probably by suicide, after being arrested for his role in the Moscow uprising. In his will, he left his money to the RSDLP, apparently intending that it should go to the party as a whole, rather than its Bolshevik or Menshevik factions. Viktor Taratuta was assigned by the Bolshevik leader Vladimir Lenin to secure the inheritance, which he did by courting and living with Schmidt's 19-year-old sister, Yekaterina (1887–1937) - though his status as a wanted revolutionary prevented them from marrying. She therefore entered into a fictitious marriage with a Bolshevik named Ignatiev, which enabled her to get control of her share of the inheritance, which she handed over to the Bolsheviks.

The dead man also had a 15-year-old brother, Aleksey, who met Lenin and Taratuta in Vyborg with his lawyers. According to one witness, the negotiations were going calmly until Taratuta suddenly threatened death on anyone who came between the Bolsheviks and the inheritance. The youth waived his claim on the money.

The affair created a scandal in revolutionary circles, not least because Taratuta was not popular or trusted. The leader of the Moscow Bolsheviks, Rosalia Zemlyachka accused him of being a police agent. This accusation was investigated by Vladimir Burtsev, the RSDLP's specialist in exposing police agents, who concluded that he was a scoundrel, but not a spy. When other revolutionaries complained to Lenin about Taratuta's questionable character, he reputedly laughed and replied:

That is exactly why he is useful to us. Precisely because he will stop at nothing. Now tell me frankly, would you consent to be a gigolo? To live with a Moscow Heiress for her money? You would not! Neither could I bring myself to do it. But Viktor did, and therefore he is a very useful man and cannot be replaced.
