= Elisei Morozov =

Russian religious writer (1798–1868)

Elisei Savvich Morozov (Russian: Елисе́й Са́ввич Моро́зов; 1798 – 1868) was the eldest son of Savva Vasilyevich Morozov of the Morozov dynasty. In 1837, he married Evdokiia Nikiforovna.

His father developed some wasteland on the right bank of the Klyazma River at a location which became Nikolskoye. In 1837, Elisei established a dye works next door but lost interest in the enterprise after becoming an Old Believer. As he became more interested in religion, he spent his time writing religious tracts while his wife, Evdokiia, ran the business.
