= Ivan Morozov (businessman) =

Russian businessman and art collector

Ivan Abramovich Morozov
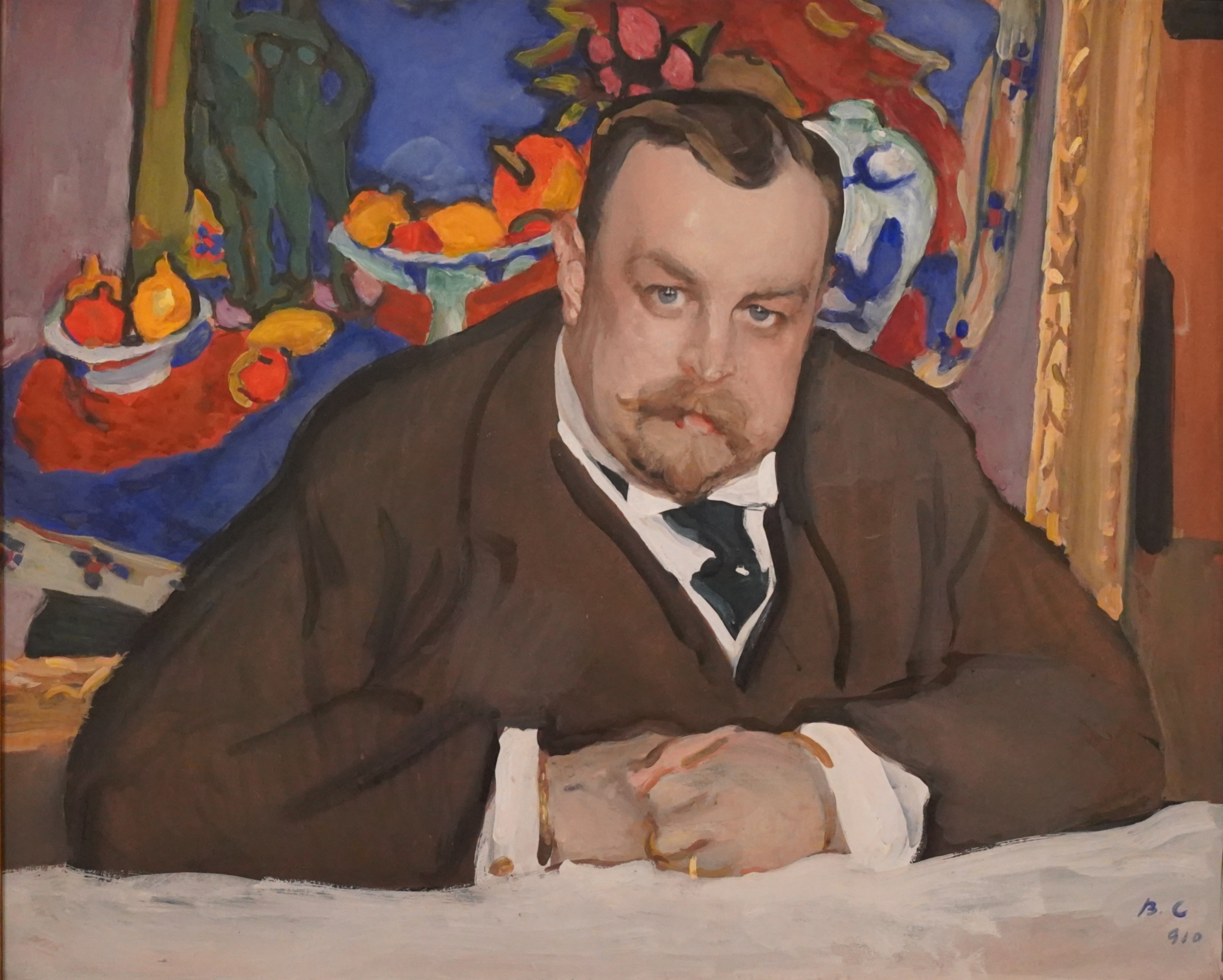
- Ivan Morozov, by Valentin Serov, 1910
- Born: 27 November 1871
- Died: 21 July 1921 (aged 49)
- Occupation: Art collector

Ivan Abramovich Morozov (Russian: Иван Абрамович Морозов, November 27, 1871 – July 21, 1921) was a Russian businessman and, from 1907 to 1914, a major collector of avant-garde French art.

== Early life ==
Ivan attended the Zurich Polytechnic from 1892 to 1894. Here he studied chemistry, but continued to paint in oil paint on Sundays.

== Family ==
Ivan was a prominent member of the Morozov dynasty. He was the second son of Abram Abramovich Morozov and his wife Varvara Alekseevna Morozova. His elder brother was Mikhail Abramovich Morozov, and his younger brother Arseny Abramovich Morozov.

== Collection ==
After the Bolshevik Revolution, the government appropriated Morozov's mansion at Prechistenka, 21 and his art collection there (by decree of the Council of People's Commissars of the Soviet Union, signed by Lenin on 8 November 1918). In 1919 they became the 2nd State Museum of Modern Western Art, while the 1st Museum of Modern Western Art was made of the mansion and collection of the other famous Russian patron, Sergei Schukin at Bolshoy Znamensky pereulok. In 1923, the 1st and 2nd Museums of Modern Western Painting were merged to form the State Museum of Modern Western Art, which since 1928 was located entirely in Morozov's mansion at Prechistenka, 21.

In October 1941, former Morozov’s canvases were evacuated to Sverdlovsk due to the fears that the German Army might occupy Moscow. But when they were brought back in 1944, the campaign against formalism in art was only gaining momentum in the USSR, with the authorities leaning to the decision to close State Museum of Modern Western Art altogether. Therefore the crates with the paintings were ordered to stay unpacked, the Museum being effectively closed, and all Morozov’s canvases doomed to oblivion.

The final liquidation of the Museum, validated by the Council of Ministers of the Soviet Union special Decree No. 672 of March 6, 1948 personally signed by Stalin provided for remnants of Morozov’s collection to be unevenly divided between the Pushkin Museum, Moscow, and the Hermitage Museum, Leningrad.

Simultaneously, Morozov’s mansion at Prechistenka, 21 was transferred to the newly created Academy of Arts of the Soviet Union, and its first President Alexander Gerasimov was seated in Morozov’s former study, where Morozov used to hang his favourite canvases by Pablo Picasso, Paul Cezanne, Henri Matisse, Paul Gauguin, Vincent van Gogh which Gerasimov profoundly disliked.

In 2008, the families of Morozov and Shchukin made efforts to compel Russia to provide them with “reasonable compensation,” which became an international legal and political issue. The families refused an offer of £5,000 to each family from the British Royal Academy in exchange for their promise not to make claims on the paintings while they were on loan to the Royal Academy for a special exhibition of the two collections in London.

== Former Ivan Morozov paintings at the Museum of Modern Western Art (1919-1948) ==
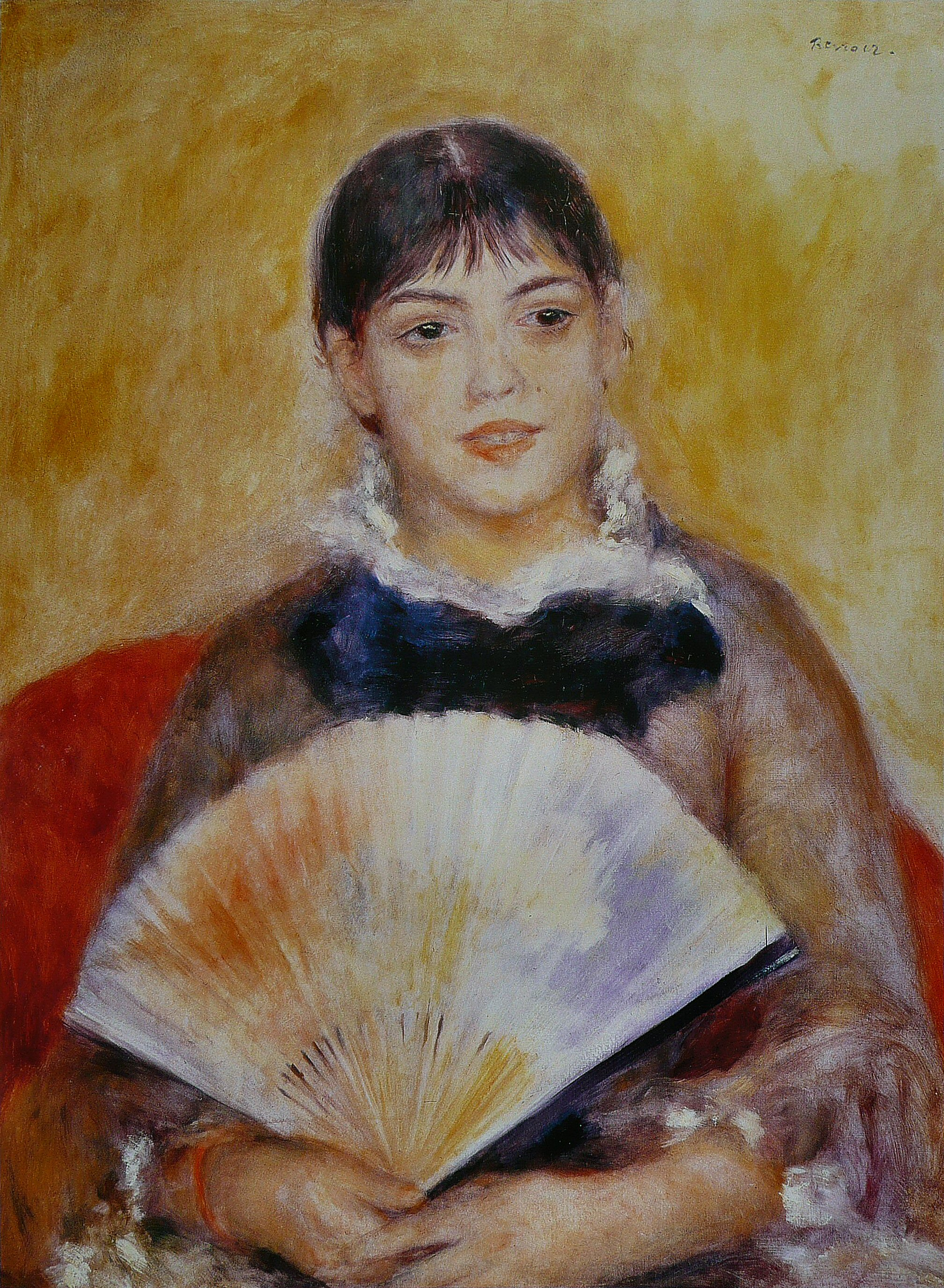
Pierre-Auguste Renoir, Fille avec un éventail, Hermitage Museum

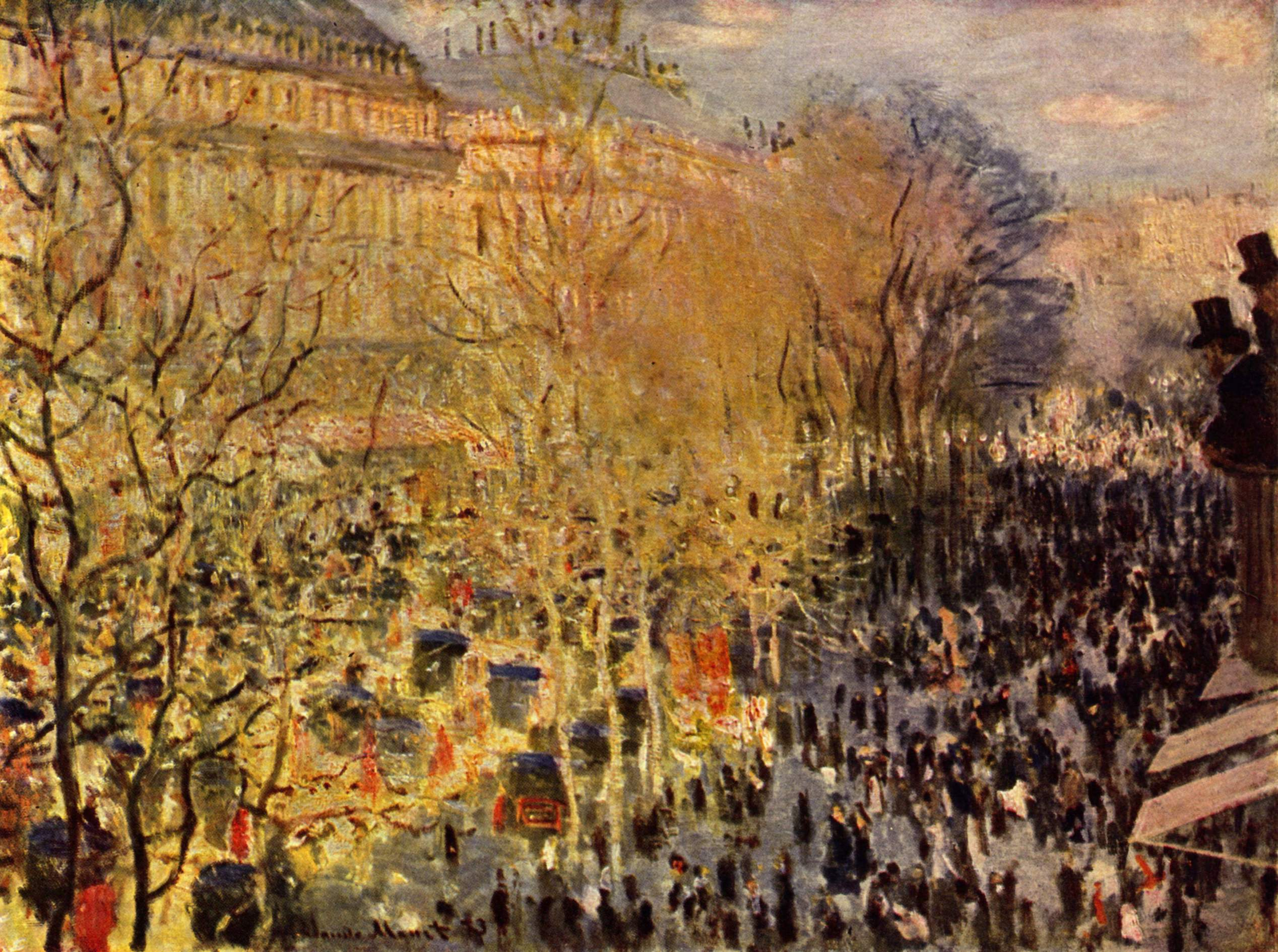
Claude Monet, Boulevard des Capucines à Paris, Pushkin Museum

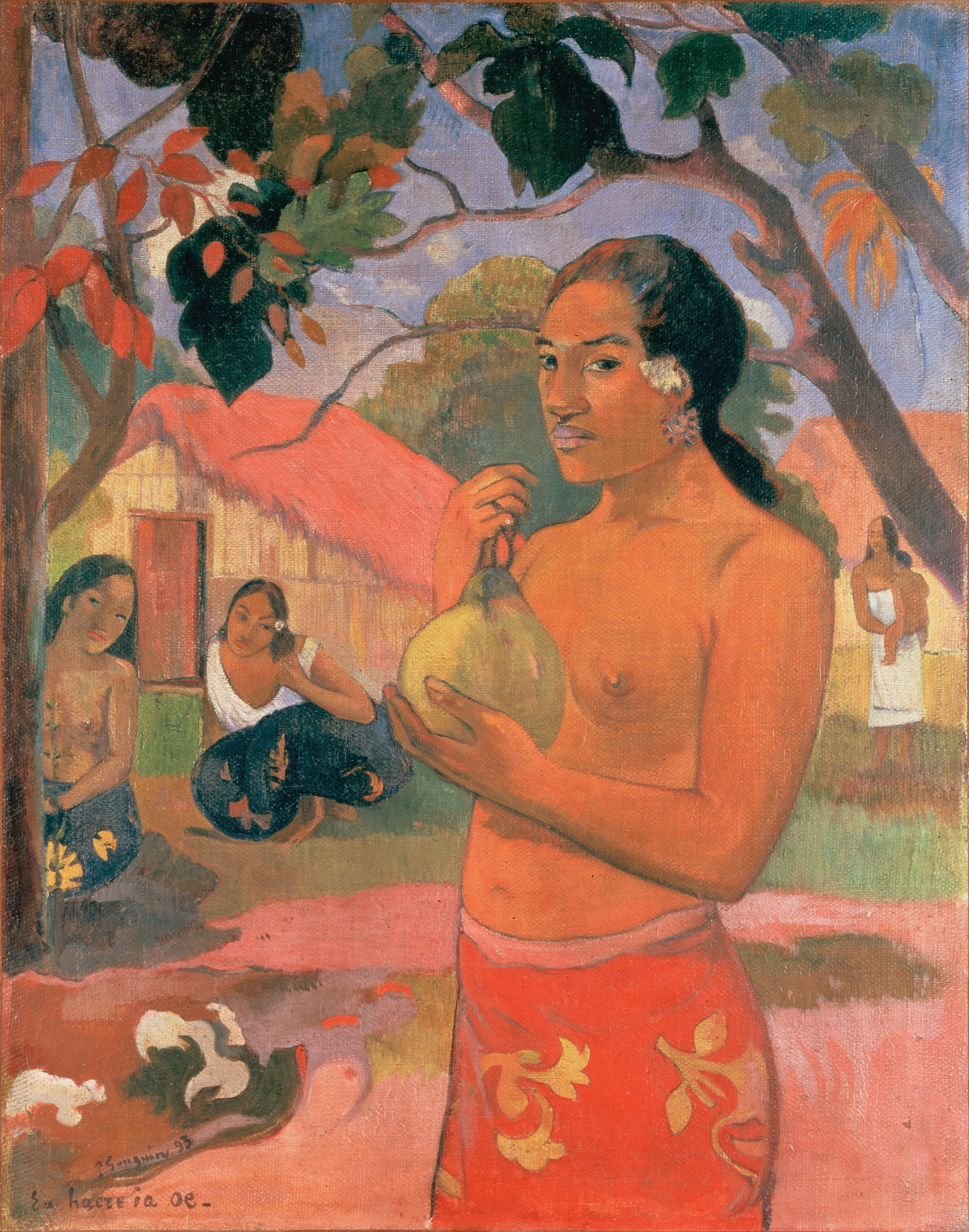
Paul Gauguin, Cueillette de fruits, Hermitage Museum

== See also ==
- The Night Café
- Sergei Shchukin
