= Savva Vasilyevich Morozov =

Russian entrepreneur (1770–1860)

- Са́вва Васи́льевич Моро́зов
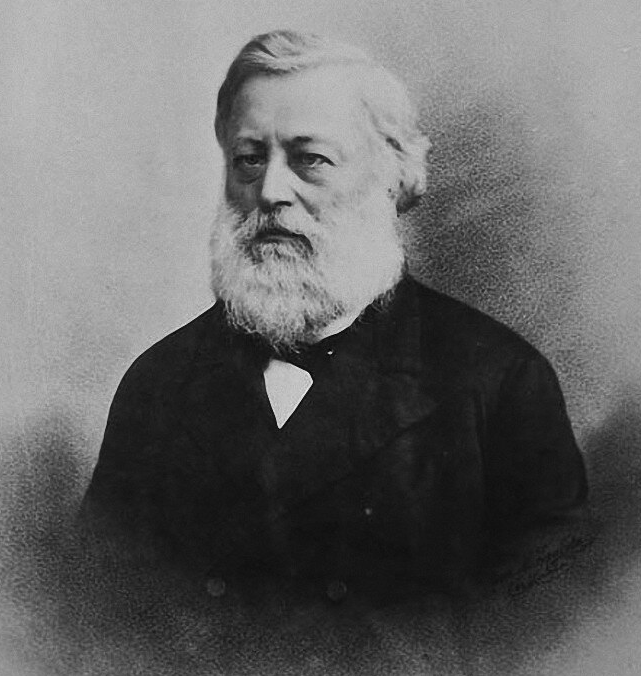
- Born: April 24, 1770; Russia
- Died: 1860 (aged 89–90)
- Occupation: Entrepreneur
- Known for: Textile manufacturer who founded the Morozov dynasty
- Spouse: Ulyana Afanasyevna
- Children: 6

Savva Vasilyevich Morozov (Russian: Са́вва Васи́льевич Моро́зов; 24 April 1770 – 1860) was an eighteenth-century Russian entrepreneur, who founded the Morozov dynasty.

== Origins ==
He was born a serf, his father, a fisherman having been sold by Vsevoloshsky along with other serfs, building and structures as part of the village of Zuevo to a collegiate counsellor called Ryumin.

But when he was twenty years old, Savva was not content with the life of a peasant. He worked in a textile factory belonging to Fedor Kononov, who lent him 1,500 roubles to buy himself out of compulsory military service. He then married Ulyana, who shared with him her families secret method of dying fabric, and Savva was able to repay his debt in two years.

Morozov benefitted from the shortage of textiles in the Russian Empire following the destruction of the textile industry around Moscow by Napoleon.

== Business activities ==
=== Innovations ===
Morozov was the first entrepreneur to import textile machinery from England. He imported machines from Hick, Hargreaves & Co and Platt Brothers. These were acquired through De Jersey & Co., for whom Ludwig Knoop worked.

== Family ==
He married Afanasyevna, the daughter of a local dye-master, with whom he had six children, these were:

- 1798: Elisei Savvich Morozov
- 1802: Zhakar Savvich Morozov
- 1806: Abram Savvich Morozov
- 1810: Ivan Savvich Morozov
- 1812: Varvara Savvichna Morozova
- 1823: Timofei Savvich Morozov
