= Varvara Alekseevna Morozova =

Russian industrialist and philanthropist

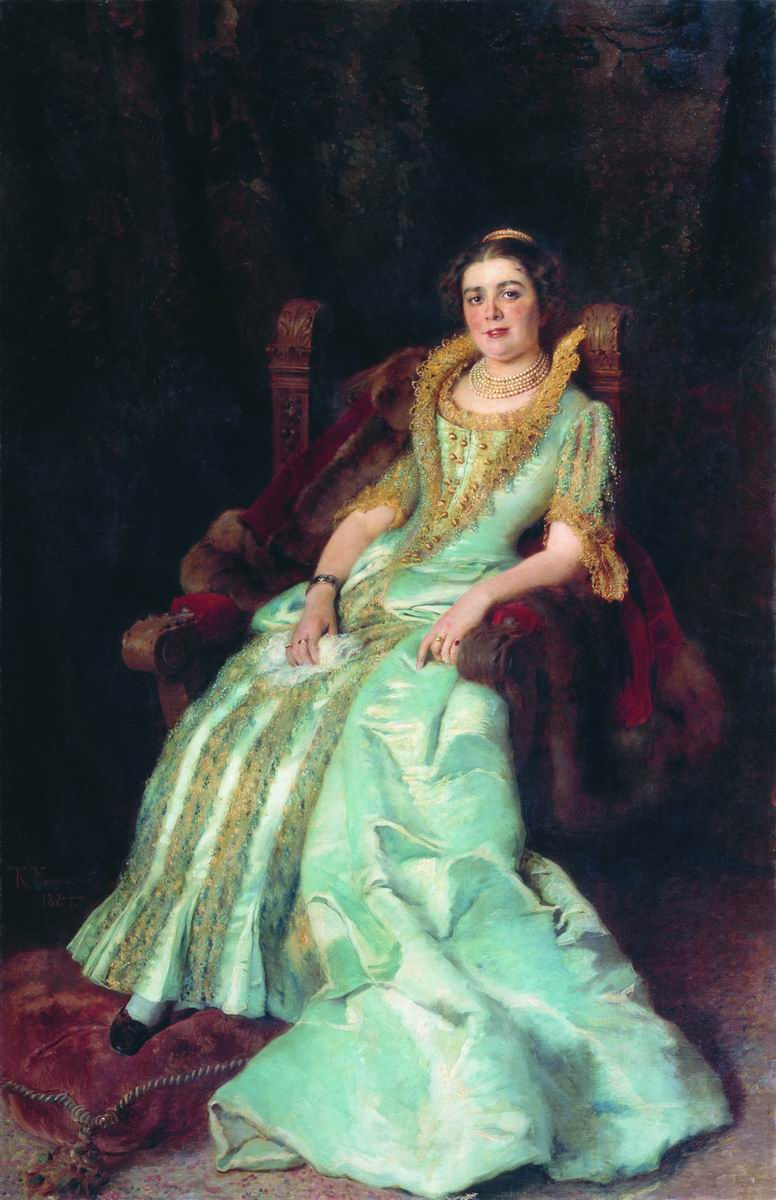
V.A. Morozova by K. Makovsky (1884)

Varvara Alekseevna Morozova (1848-1917) was a Russian industrialist. She was the daughter of Aleksey Khludov and married to Abram Abramovich Morozov and Vasily Mikhailovich Sobolevsky. She was the acting president of the Tver Manufactory Association from 1882. She was also the perhaps most famed philanthropist in Moscow and awarded with an Imperial medal for her charitable work, known particularly as the patron of the Moscow University.

== Family ==
With Abram Morozov she had three sons:

- Mikhail Abramovich Morozov (1870-1903), eldest son
- Ivan Morozov (1871–1921), second son was a Russian businessman and from 1907 to 1914 a major collector of avant-garde French art.
- Arseny Abramovich Morozov (1874-1908), youngest son
