= Nußdorf =

Nußdorf or Nussdorf may refer to:

== Places ==
=== Austria ===
- Nussdorf, Vienna
  - Nussdorf weir and lock
- Nußdorf ob der Traisen, Lower Austria
- Nußdorf am Haunsberg, Salzburg
- Nußdorf am Attersee, Upper Austria
- Nußdorf-Debant, Tyrol

=== Germany ===
- Nußdorf am Inn, Rosenheim district, Bavaria
- Nußdorf (Chiemgau), Traunstein district, Bavaria
- Nußdorf, Landau, Rhineland-Palatinate
- Nußdorf, Eberdingen, Baden-Württemberg

=== Elsewhere ===
- German name of Orzechówko, Olecko County, Poland
- German name of Năsăud, Romania
- German name of Geomal, Stremț, Romania

== Other uses ==
- Hans Nussdorf, a late gothic architect
- 73686 Nussdorf, a minor planet

== See also ==
- Ořech
- Orzechów (disambiguation) (Polish toponyms), Orekhov (disambiguation)
- Orzechowo (disambiguation) (Polish toponyms), Orekhovo (disambiguation)
- Orechová
- Orzechówko (disambiguation) (Polish toponyms)
- Orešany (Czech and Slovak toponyms)
- Diós (Hungarian toponyms)
