= Abandoned railway =

Railway line which is no longer used

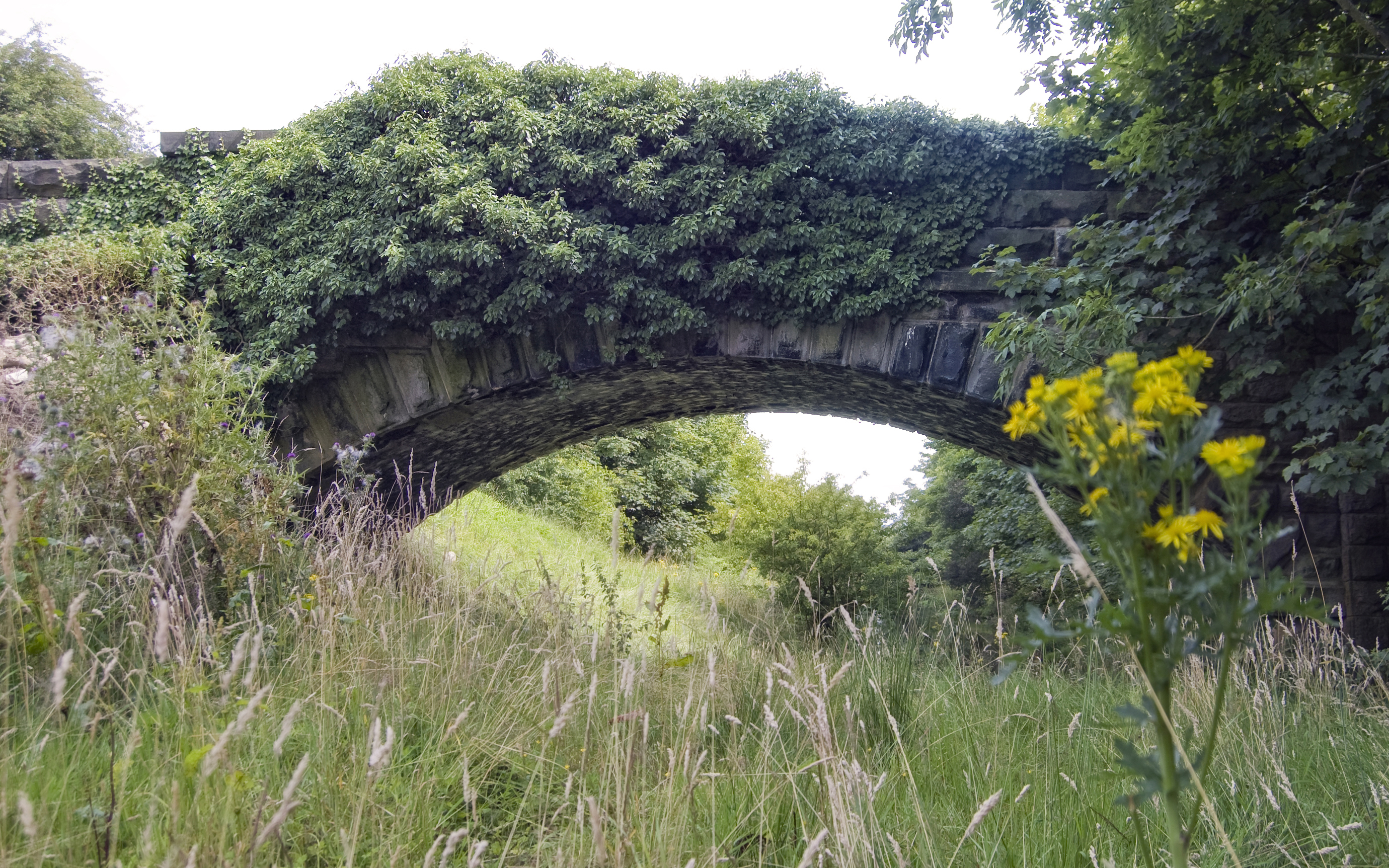
An abandoned branch of the Otley and Ilkley Joint Railway, England

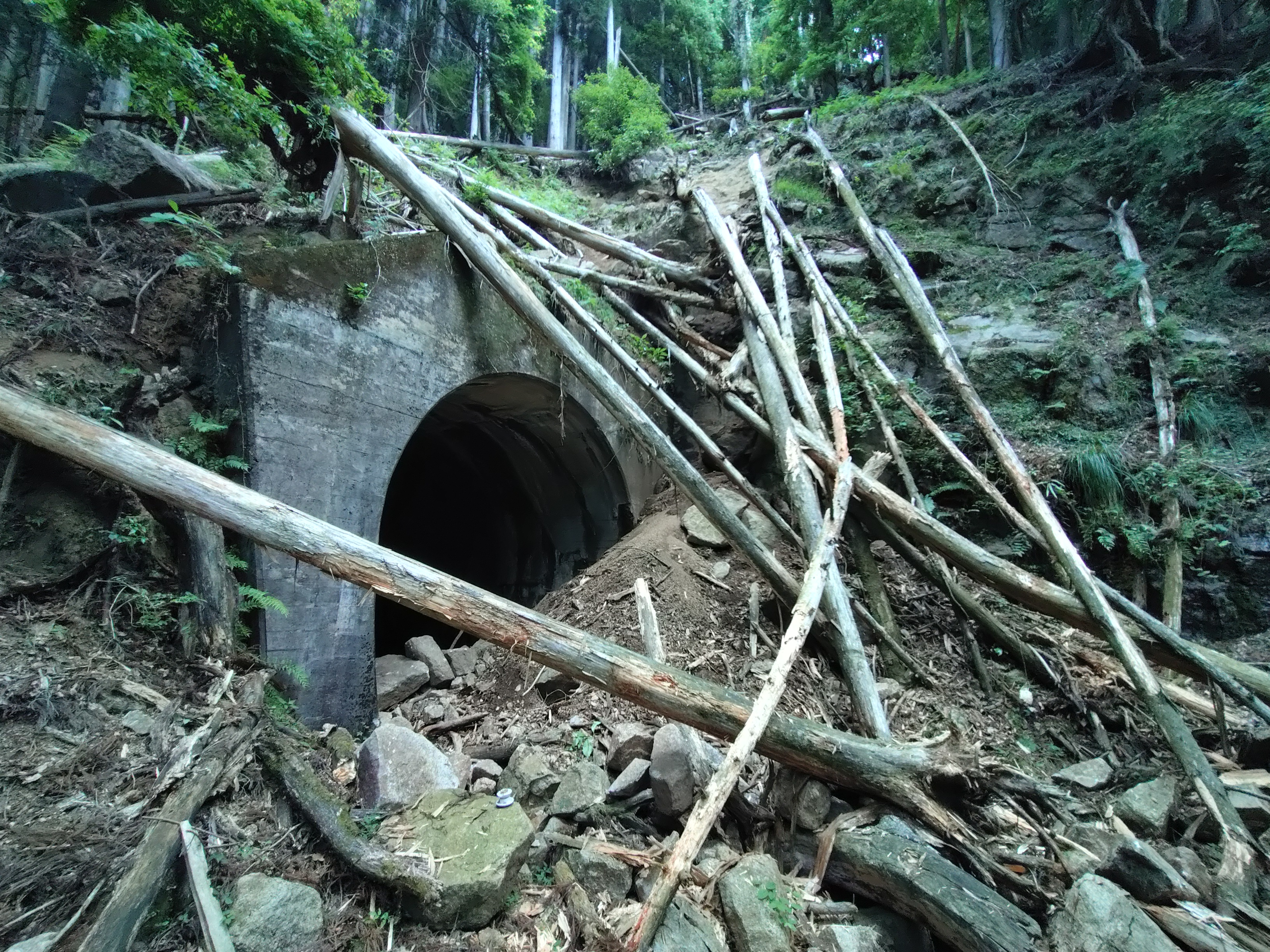
Abandoned railway tunnel, Taguchi Railroad, Japan

An abandoned railroad is a railway line which is no longer used for that purpose. Such lines may be disused railways, closed railways, former railway lines, or derelict railway lines. Some have had all their track and sleepers removed, and others have material remaining from their former usage.

There are many hundreds of these throughout the world. Thousands of miles of railroads have been abandoned in the United States, much of it in the 40 years from 1965 to 2005. The right-of-way which has been established for such a line makes it useful for other transport, such as a rail trail. Other uses are possible. For example, in 1936, farmers in Aldrich, Missouri, found various uses for the land and materials of an abandoned railway. The abandoned railway stations on the line may be put to some other use too.

== Reasons for abandonment ==
Many old railway lines have stopped making a profit. The decision to abandon a line may be taken by a railway company or by government, as with the Beeching cuts in Great Britain in the 1960s.

Railways specially built for mines or other industrial or logistical sites are abandoned if the mine is exhausted or the production ceases.

War can also lead to abandonment. In former Finnish Karelia, changes of borders due to World War II in 1945 led to several railways being abandoned or even demolished by their taker, the Soviet Union. A railway could become international, and without a border checkpoint, the line would become useless. Also, without connecting traffic, the traffic volume could be too low: evacuation of Finnish Karelia removed the Finnish population and international trade would not have been equally viable as domestic trade.

Finland was obliged to keep the Laurila–Kelloselkä track open as a peace treaty article, although it was never used for international traffic, only for local lumber transport. Before the war, the track ended in Kemijärvi, 270 km from the border, but the Soviet Union demanded Kemijärvi to be connected via rail to Soviet Kantalahti. However, when a metal thief stole 1.7 km of track in 2008, the government declared it was no longer required to maintain the track. It was last used in 2010.

== In the United States ==
Railroads have been abandoned in the United States due to historical and economic factors. In the 19th century, the growing industrial regions in the Northeast, the agrarian regions in the South and Midwest, and the expansion of the country westward to the Pacific Ocean all contributed to the explosive growth of railroad companies and their rights-of-way across the entire country. Railroad mileage within the U.S. reached its peak in the mid-1910s, with over 254,000 miles of railways in use. Eventually, competing modes of transportation began siphoning away passenger and freight revenues from railroad companies, even as they struggled to earn profits from prices regulated under the Interstate Commerce Act. The Great Depression of the 1930s forced some railroad companies into bankruptcy, creating hundreds of miles of disowned and subsequently abandoned railway properties; other railroad companies found incentive to merge or reorganize, during which excess or redundant rights-of-way were abandoned.

These and other factors have implicitly created thousands of miles of abandoned railroad corridors that criss-cross the States. While most lie dormant and are still under the ownership of the abandoning railroad company, some cause political controversies in communities through which they run due to property disputes once the land returns to adjacent landowners; others are converted to rail-trail use, an increasingly popular option that opens once-abandoned corridors up to the public for bicycle commuting and leisure, while at the same time preserving them for possible future railroad use. A few abandoned railways have been rebuilt and used as active railroad routes once again.

Abandonments in the United States are controlled under Title 49, Chapter 10, Part 1152 of the Code of Federal Regulations, and are administered by the Surface Transportation Board, an adjudicatory body within the U.S. Department of Transportation. The abandonment process starts when the railroad company submits a notice to the STB about their intent to abandon a railway line; this notice is served 10 days before the formal abandonment petition is filed by the railroad company. A petition for abandonment can also be filed by a party other than the owner of a railroad, such as a municipality, in a process known as adverse abandonment. Once filed, various timeframes are allotted in order for other interested parties to proffer their requests regarding the abandonment; any intent by a rail-trail advocacy group to convert the right-of-way into a rail-trail (called railbanking) must be submitted within 30 days, while any financial assistance offers to either purchase the property outright or to subsidize rail traffic on the line must be submitted within 50 days. If ultimately approved by the STB, the line will be formally abandoned, or converted to trail use if the railroad and trail advocacy group arrive at an agreement on terms and price of the sale of the property, or operated by the owning railroad (via a subsidy) or by a new owner.

== Gallery ==
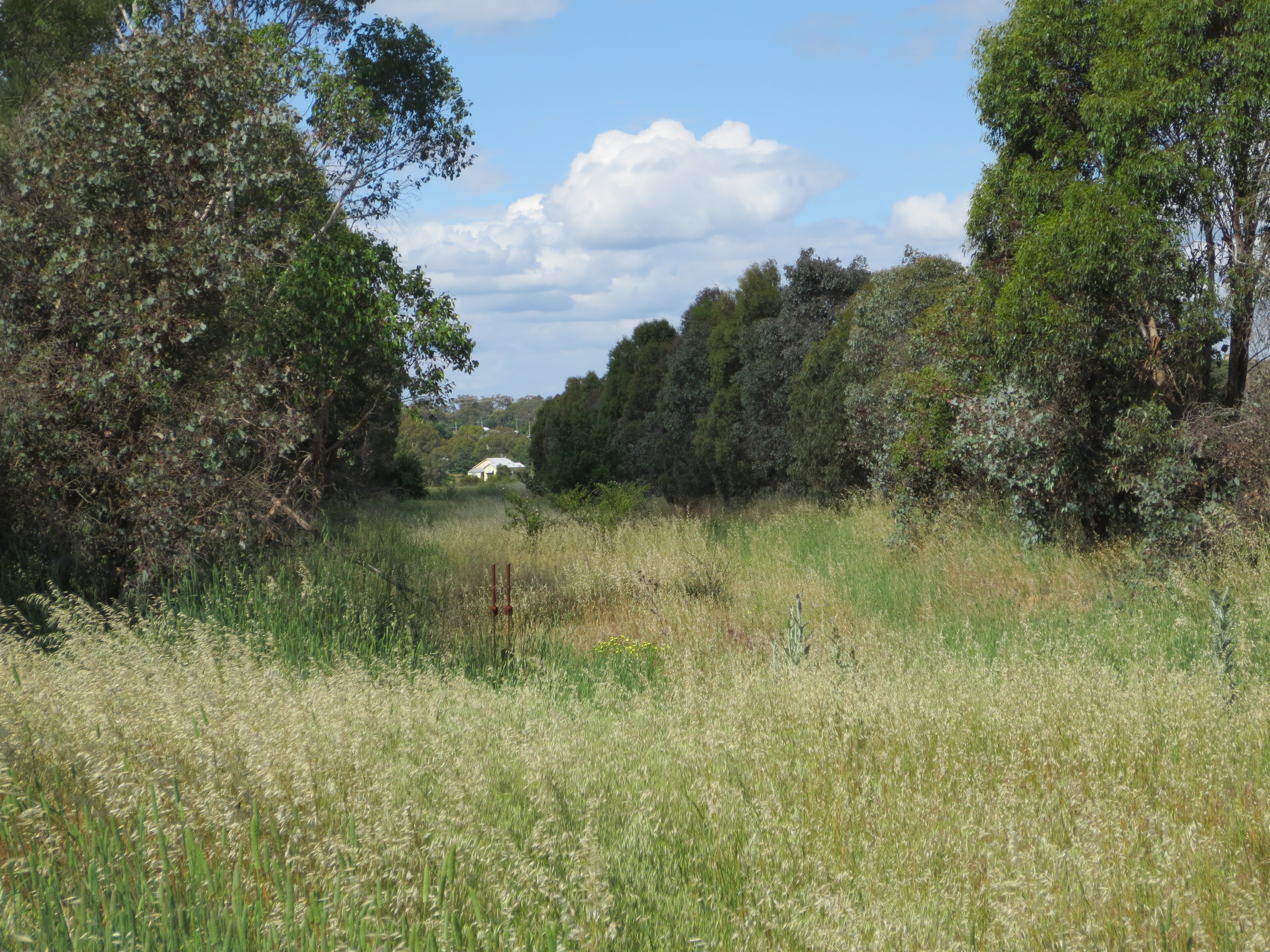
Example of conversion of part of an abandoned railway line to a regenerated habitat

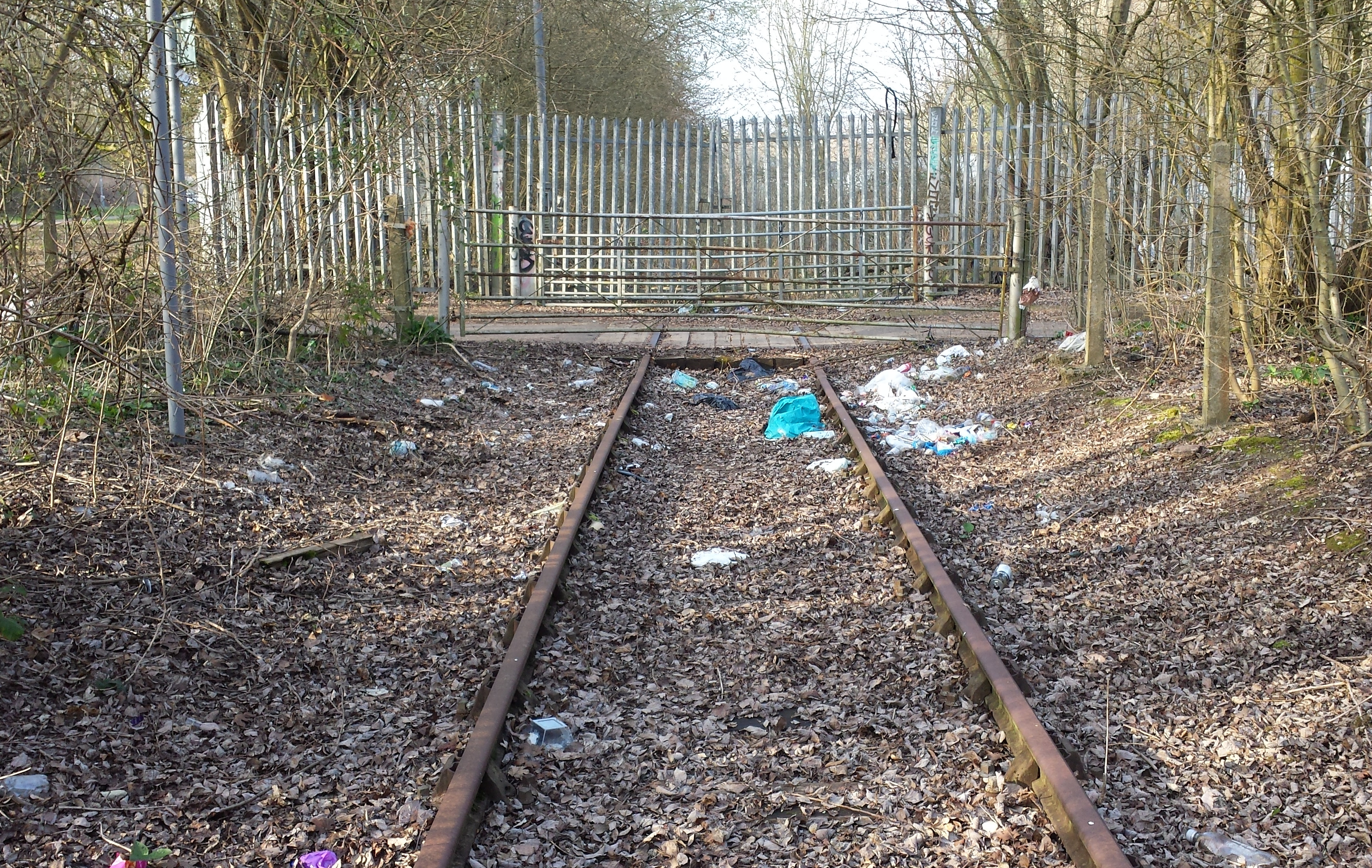
Remains of the Highworth Branch Line in Swindon, England

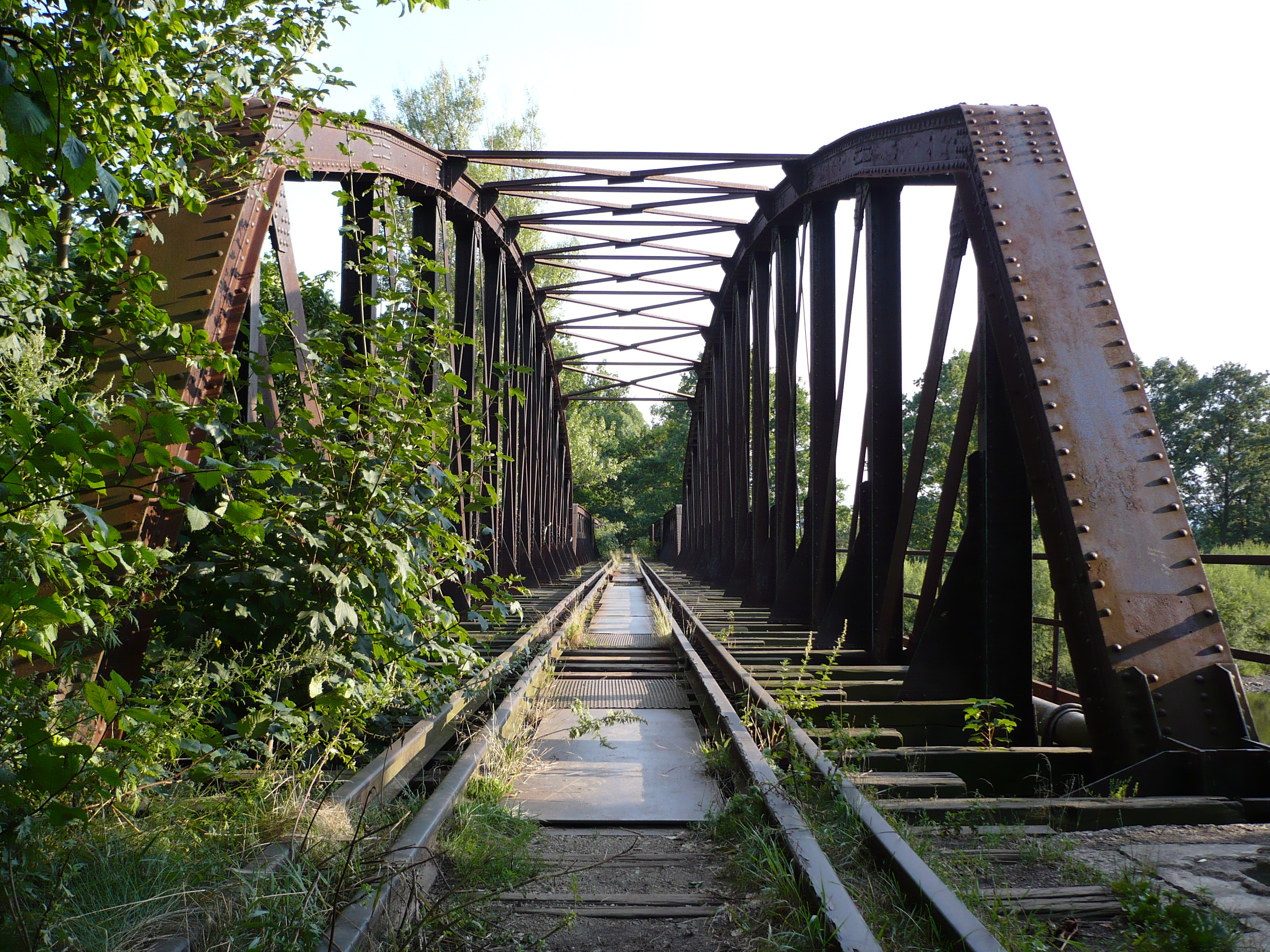
Abandoned railway bridge over Nysa Kłodzka in Otmuchów, Poland

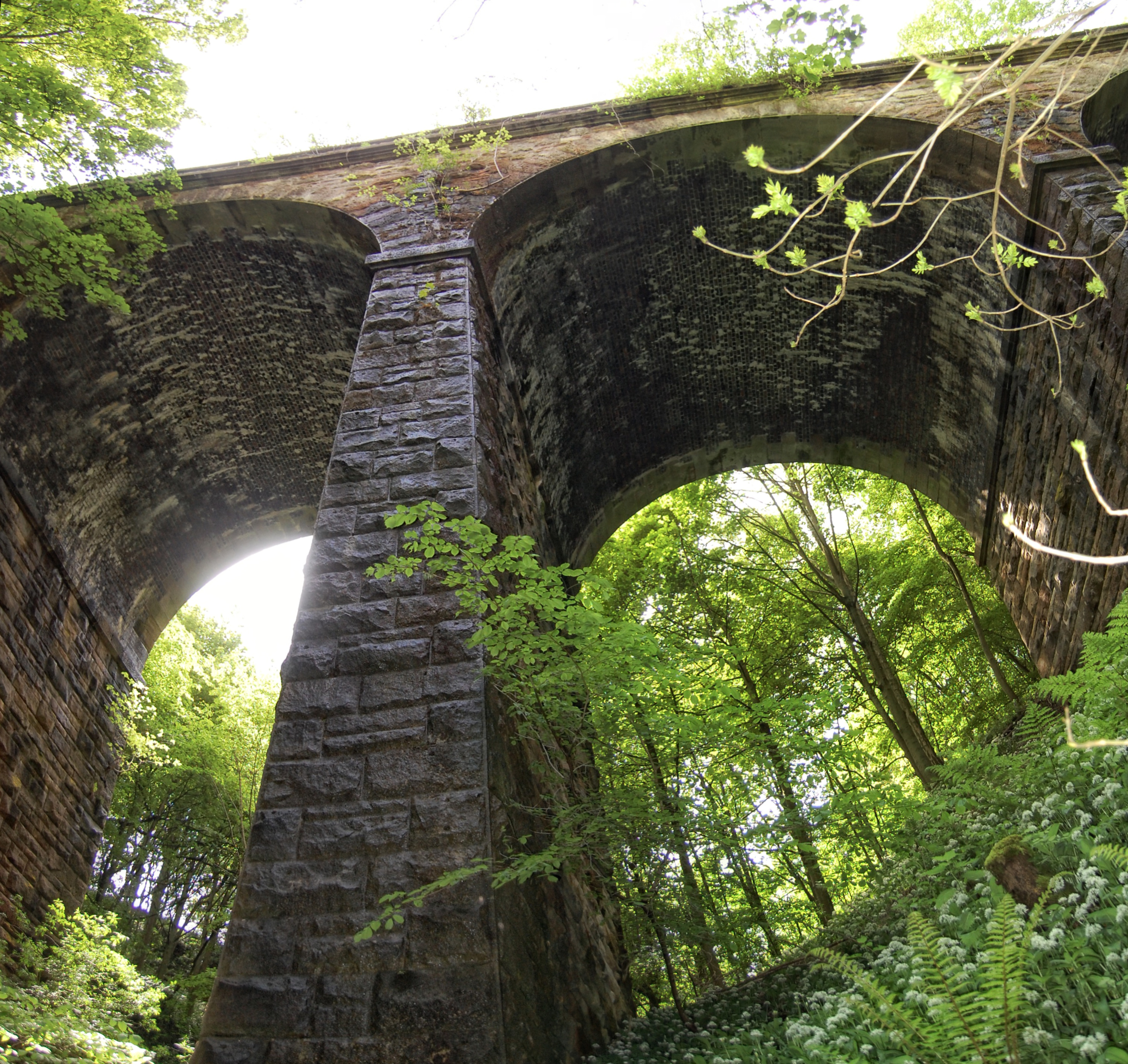
The overgrown viaduct across Lobb Ghyll on the Skipton to Ilkley Line in Yorkshire, built by the Midland Railway in 1888 and closed in 1965

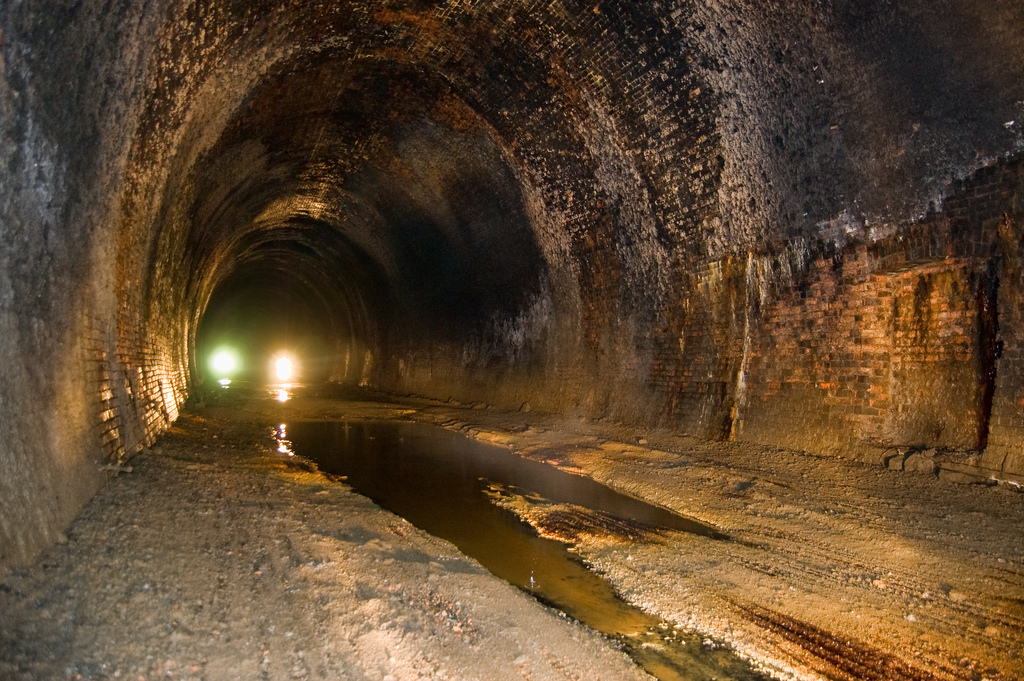
Prospect Tunnel: an abandoned railway structure in Yorkshire, England

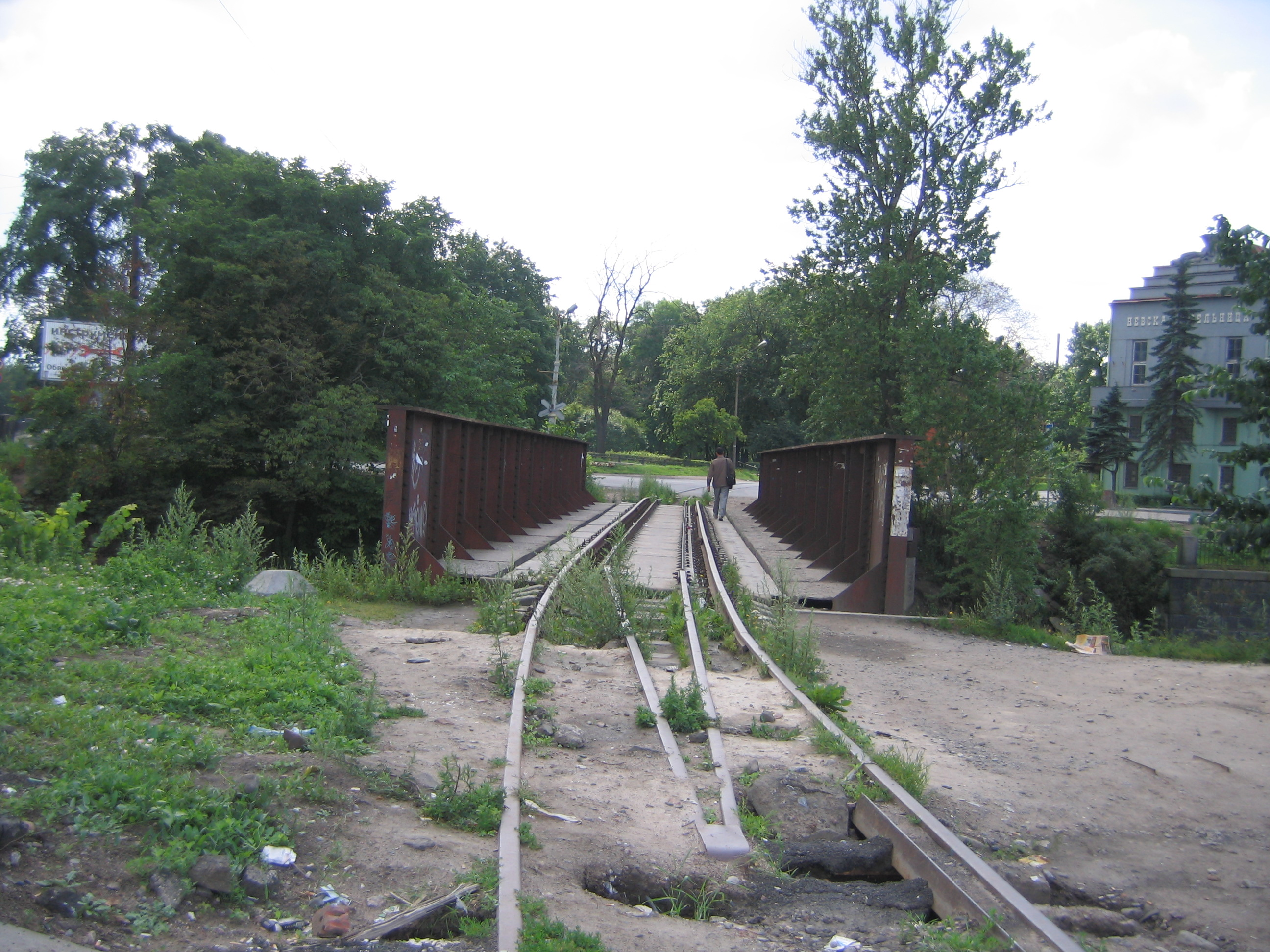
Abandoned railway bridge over Obvodny Canal, Saint Petersburg, Russia

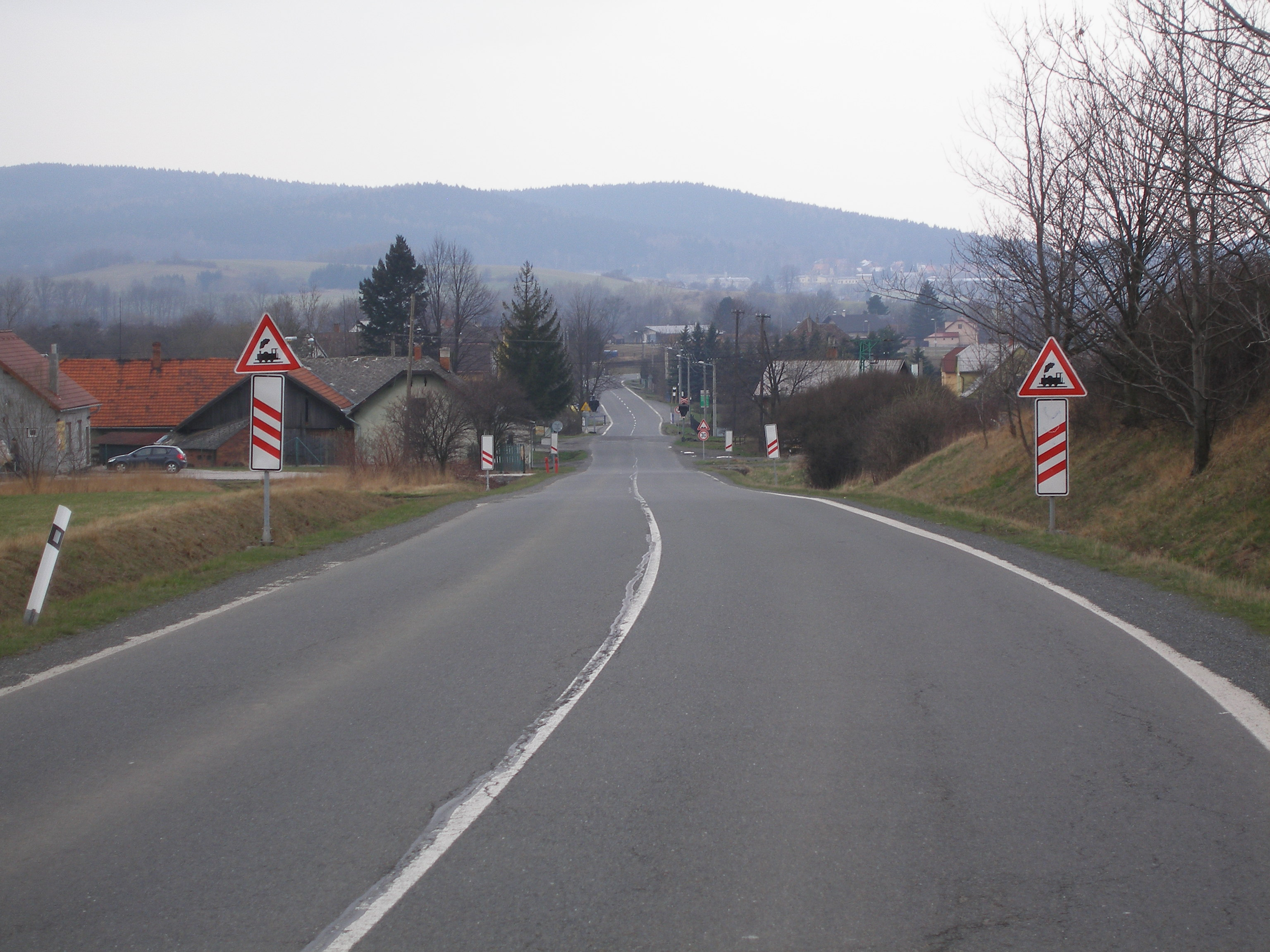
Abandoned level crossing in Mořkov, Czech Republic. Now overtaken by a bicycle path since 2014.

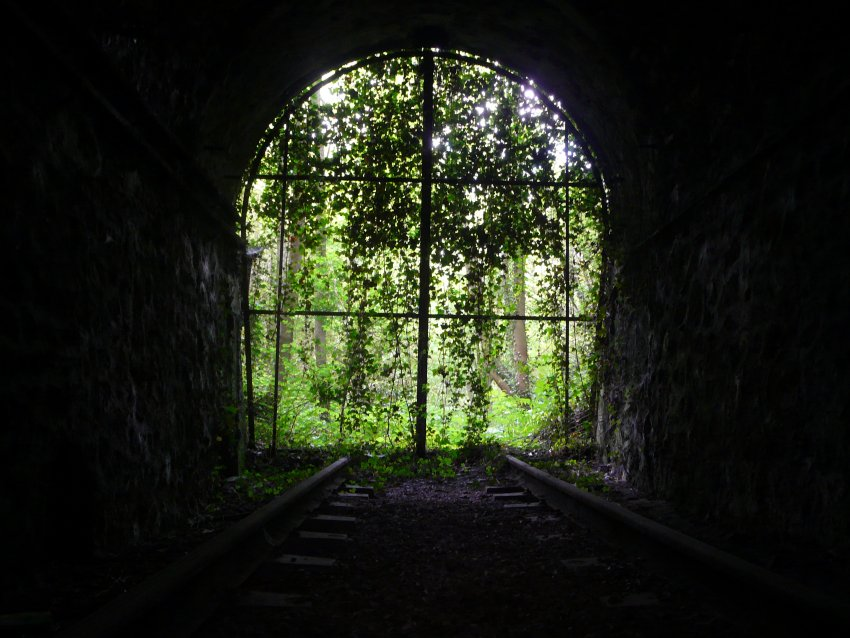
Darblay tunnel, France

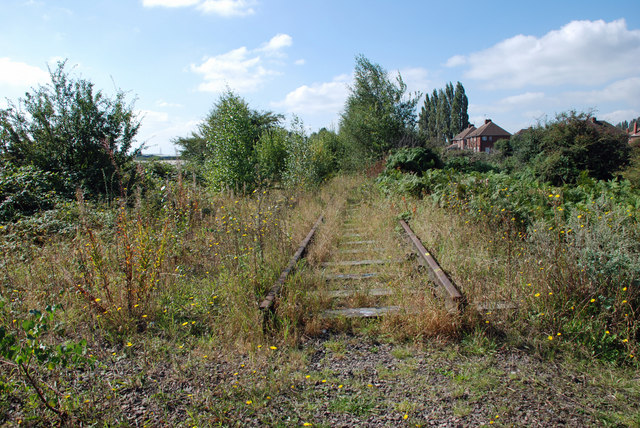
The embankment leading to Parkhead Viaduct, Oxford, Worcester and Wolverhampton Railway, England

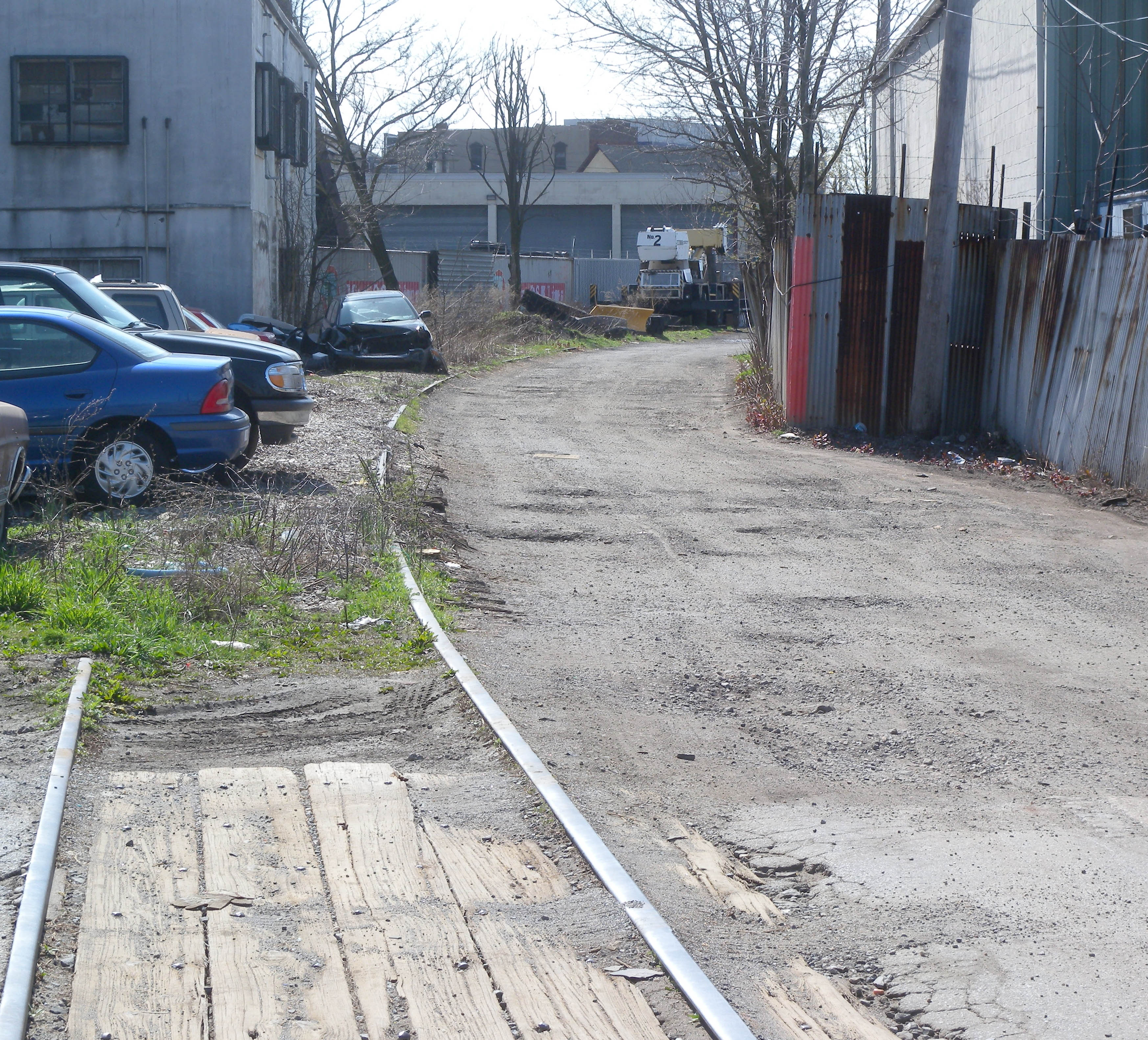
Former level crossing of Staten Island Railway

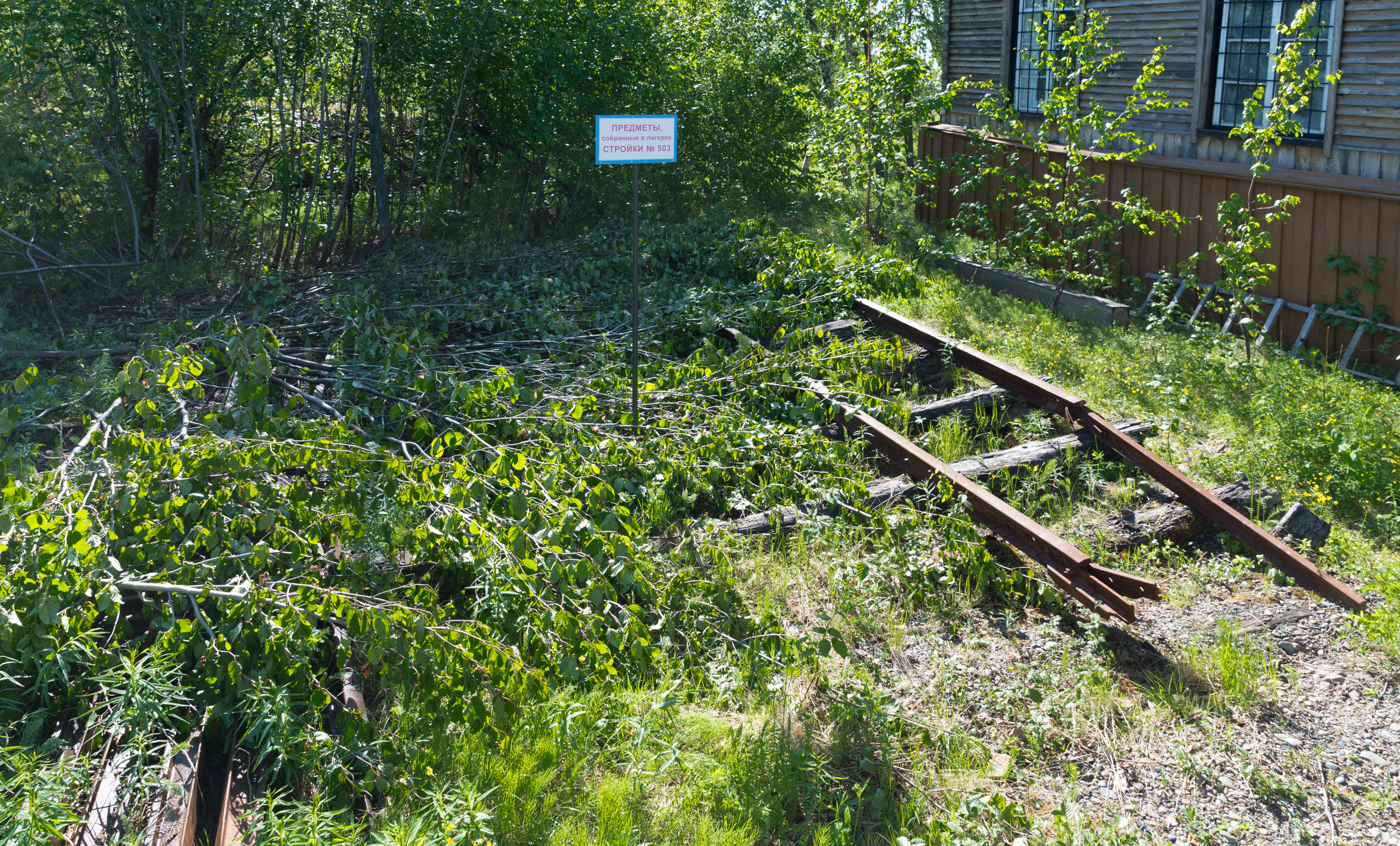
Remnants of the Salekhard–Igarka Railway in northern Siberia, Russia

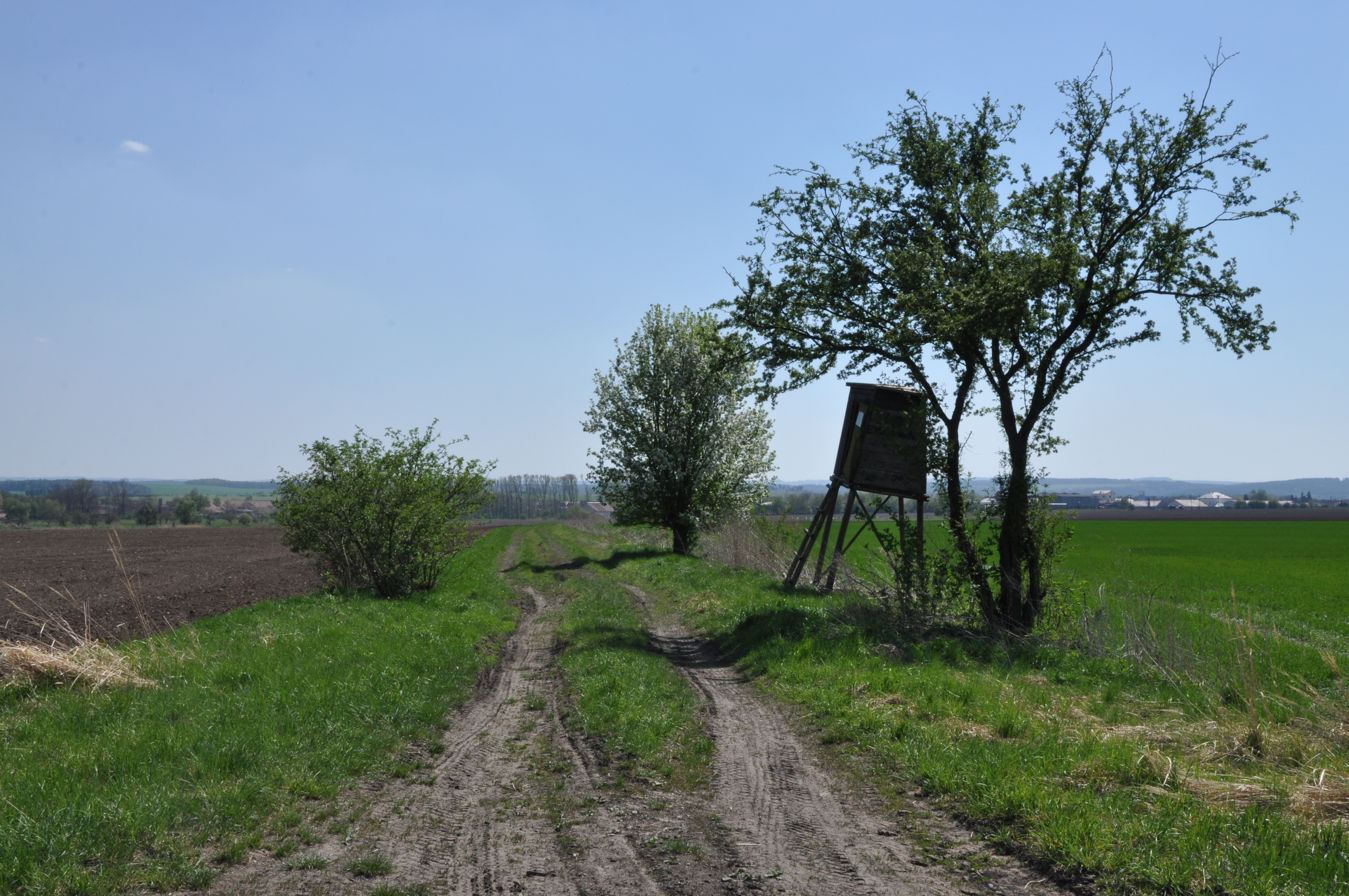
Abandoned track over Přestavlky, Czech Republic

== See also ==
- Lists of former rail lines
- Orphan bridge
- Urban exploration – the examination of the normally unseen or off-limits parts of urban areas or industrial facilities
