= Ř =

Latin letter R with caron

R with caron
- Ř ř

Usage
- Writing system: Latin script
- Type: Alphabet
- Language of origin: Czech, Upper Sorbian
- In Unicode: U+0158, U+0159

Ř (minuscule: ř), known as R with caron, is a Latin-script letter. It is used in Czech and Upper Sorbian, as well as several other languages written in the Latin script. It was also used in proposed orthographies for the Silesian language. It has been used in academic transcriptions for rhotic sounds.

The Unicode glyphs are U+0158 Ř LATIN CAPITAL LETTER R WITH CARON and U+0159 ř LATIN SMALL LETTER R WITH CARON. Either can also be represented using the combining character U+030C ◌̌ COMBINING CARON.

== Usage ==
=== Czech ===
Ř is the 28th letter of the Czech alphabet. In the Czech language ř is used to denote /r̝/, a raised alveolar non-sonorant trill. Its manner of articulation is similar to other alveolar trills but the tongue is raised; it is partially fricative. It is usually voiced, [r̝], but it also has a voiceless allophone [r̝̊] occurring in the vicinity of voiceless consonants or at the end of a word.

In the oldest medieval texts, the sound of ř was simply spelled as r, then it was written using a variety of letter combinations, such as rs, rſ, rſſ, rz, and rzſ (compare oltars to modern oltář). According to Jan Gebauer (1894), the earliest known distinct appearance is in the place names Lukohorſany and Orſechow in a charter or deed from 1237. In the early 15th century work De orthographia bohemica, attributed to Jan Hus, the letter ṙ is introduced. The dot diacritic above the letter gradually had various forms, which eventually became the modern ř.

=== Upper Sorbian ===
Ř is a letter in the Upper Sorbian alphabet. In the Upper Sorbian language it denotes the voiceless postalveolar fricative [ʃ]. The letter only occurs after p, t, and k; it originates from older r that had been devoiced by those sounds by the early 9th century, and became a sibilant in the following centuries. The letter does not appear in the orthography of Lower Sorbian.

=== Silesian ===
The letter is present in a proposed alphabet for Silesian, the Silesian Phonetic Alphabet, created in 2006. The alphabet was created with the goal of limiting the use of digraphs as much as possible, by replacing them with single characters. Ř had also been proposed in an orthography presented in 2001 by Piotr Kalinowski and Józef Kulisz, being used instead of the Polish digraph ⟨rz⟩ /ʐ/; this was done with the intention of emphasizing the separateness of Silesian from Polish. The writing system was only used in a few short internet entries of both codifiers. The letter was also used in a project by the linguist Jolanta Tambor, presented in 2008, which was meant to reflect the phonetic diversity of the entire Silesian-speaking region by assigning letters to sounds heard only in some areas; ř represented the fricative trill of Cieszyn Silesian, like in Czech. The system did not attract much interest and is known only from the text of her paper.

=== Romani ===
It is used by academics and activists to represent the Romani language's second rhotic retained in some dialects (which is also commonly spelled as ⟨rr⟩), variously pronounced as a long trill [rr], a uvular trill [ʀ], or a retroflex tap [ɽ] or approximant [ɻ].

=== Piemontese ===
Ř is a letter used in some varieties of Piemontese. It is used to indicate an [r] that tends towards [ɹ] (the ‘rounded’ r), typical of the Langhe, Monferrato and Mondovì areas and some neighbouring areas of Liguria. On some non-technical websites it is represented with the wrong glyph ȓ.

=== Katë ===
It is used in Katë by academics to represent the voiced retroflex approximant [ɻ] found in all dialects, which has several allophonic realizations, including the R-colored vowel.

=== Kurdish ===
In some Latin-based scripts of Kurdish, it represents the voiced alveolar trill [r], as opposed to the alveolar tap [ɾ] represented by ⟨r⟩.

=== Americanist notation ===
In Americanist phonetic notation, ř has been used to represent a flap. This usage might come from William A. Smalley in Manual of Articulatory Phonetics (1963).

=== Berber ===
The letter is used in scholarly transcriptions of Riffian Berber. It represents a sound that comes from historical *l; in most Riffian dialects it is distinguished from r by its lack of influence on nearby vowels, however in some dialects this contrast is strengthened either by ř being trilled and r being a tap, or by ř being palatalized and r not being palatalized. Ř is a rhotic approximant or fricative in some dialects.

=== Hausa ===
In Paul Newman's transcription of Hausa (seen in A History of the Hausa Language), it is used to represent the trill, as opposed to the flap represented by r. The contrast between the two is marginal in the modern language, but the distinction is important for tracing the phonological history of Hausa.

=== IPA ===
Lowercase ř is an obsolete symbol of the International Phonetic Alphabet, used as of 1912 and 1926. It represented the apicoalveolar fricative trill (as in Czech). The symbol was replaced by ɼ, a long-legged r, which was rarely used for a few decades before being retired in 1989. The sound is now represented by [r̝].

=== Umbrian ===
In transliterations of the native alphabet of the extinct Umbrian language, ř is used to designate a sound of unknown quality, generally deriving from earlier intervocalic *d (and also from intervocalic *l that preceded a front vowel). The same sound was represented in the Latin alphabet by the sequence ⟨rs⟩.

== Encodings ==
Character information
Preview	Ř		ř	
Unicode name	LATIN CAPITAL LETTER R WITH CARON		LATIN SMALL LETTER R WITH CARON	
Encodings	decimal	hex	dec	hex
Unicode	344	U+0158	345	U+0159
UTF-8	197 152	C5 98	197 153	C5 99
Numeric character reference	&#344;	&#x158;	&#345;	&#x159;
Named character reference	&Rcaron;		&rcaron;	
ISO 8859-2	216	D8	248	F8

== Gallery ==
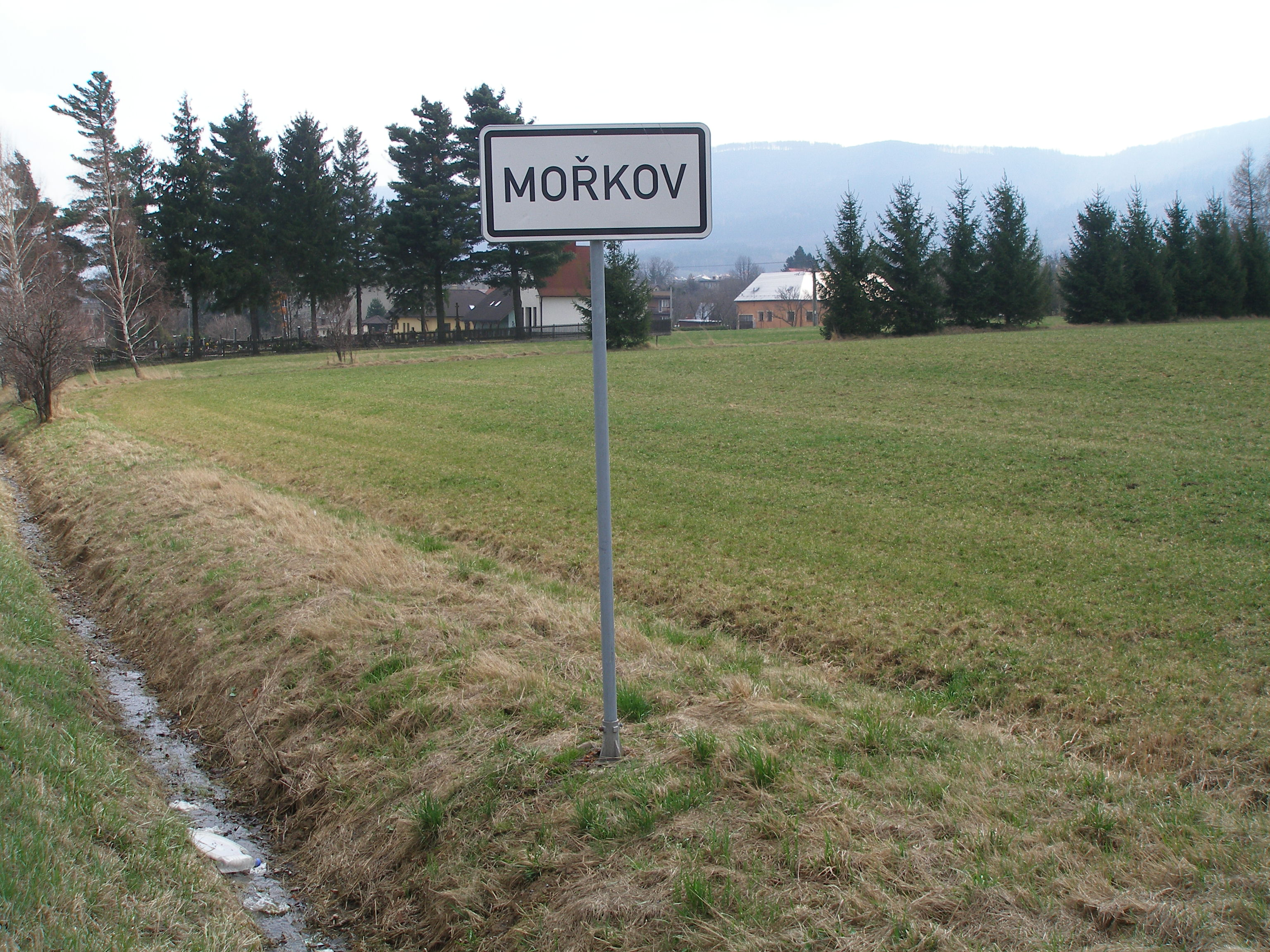
Mořkov - Ř on a road sign in Czechia

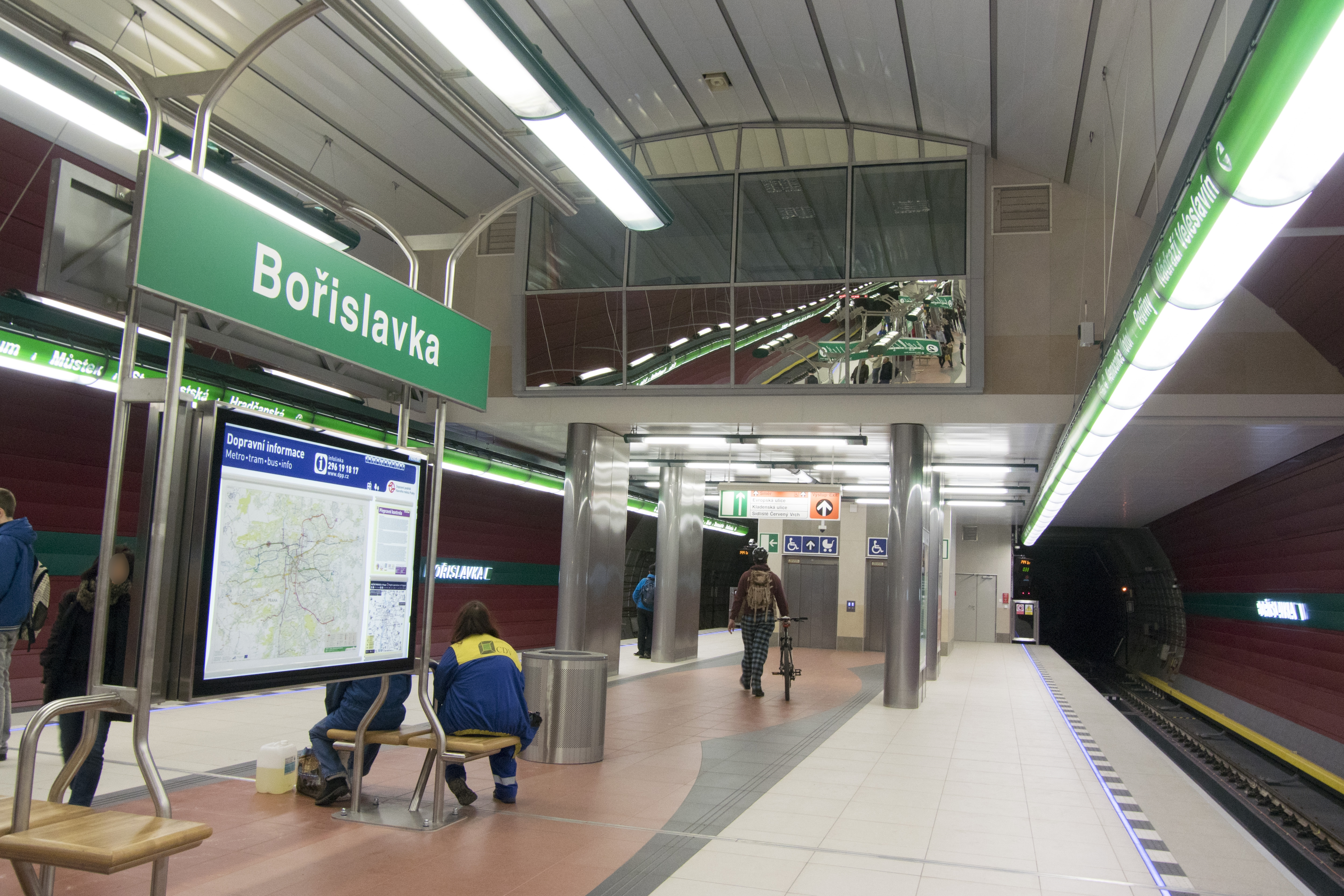
Bořislavka Prague Metro station

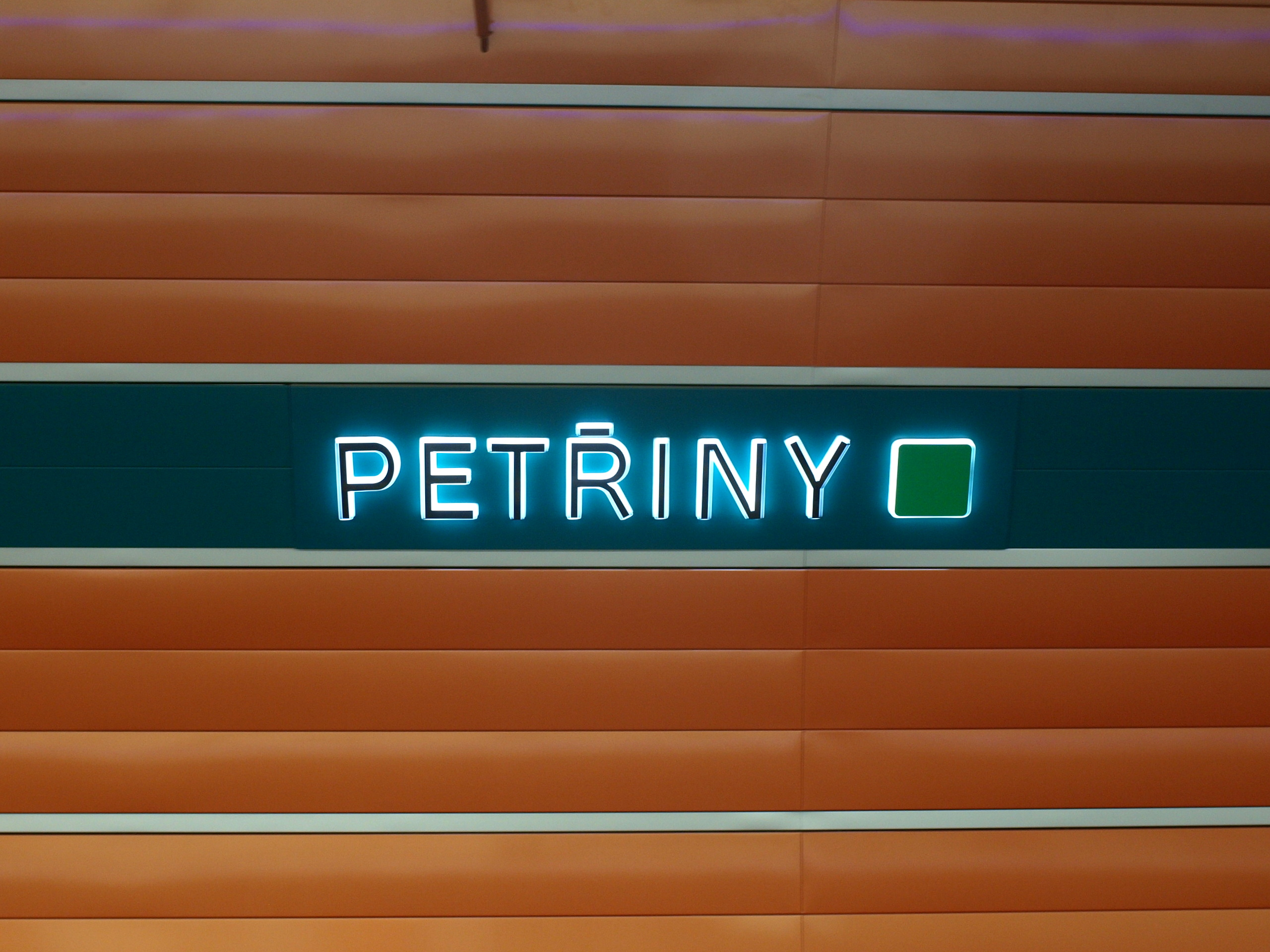
Petřiny Prague Metro station

== See also ==
- Ŕ
- Rz (digraph)
