= Ořechov =

Ořechov may refer to places in the Czech Republic:

- Ořechov (Brno-Country District), a municipality and village in the South Moravian Region
- Ořechov (Jihlava District), a municipality and village in the Vysočina Region
- Ořechov (Uherské Hradiště District), a municipality and village in the Zlín Region
- Ořechov (Žďár nad Sázavou District), a municipality and village in the Vysočina Region
- Velký Ořechov, a municipality and village in the Zlín Region

== See also ==
- Orzechów (disambiguation)
- Orekhov (disambiguation)
