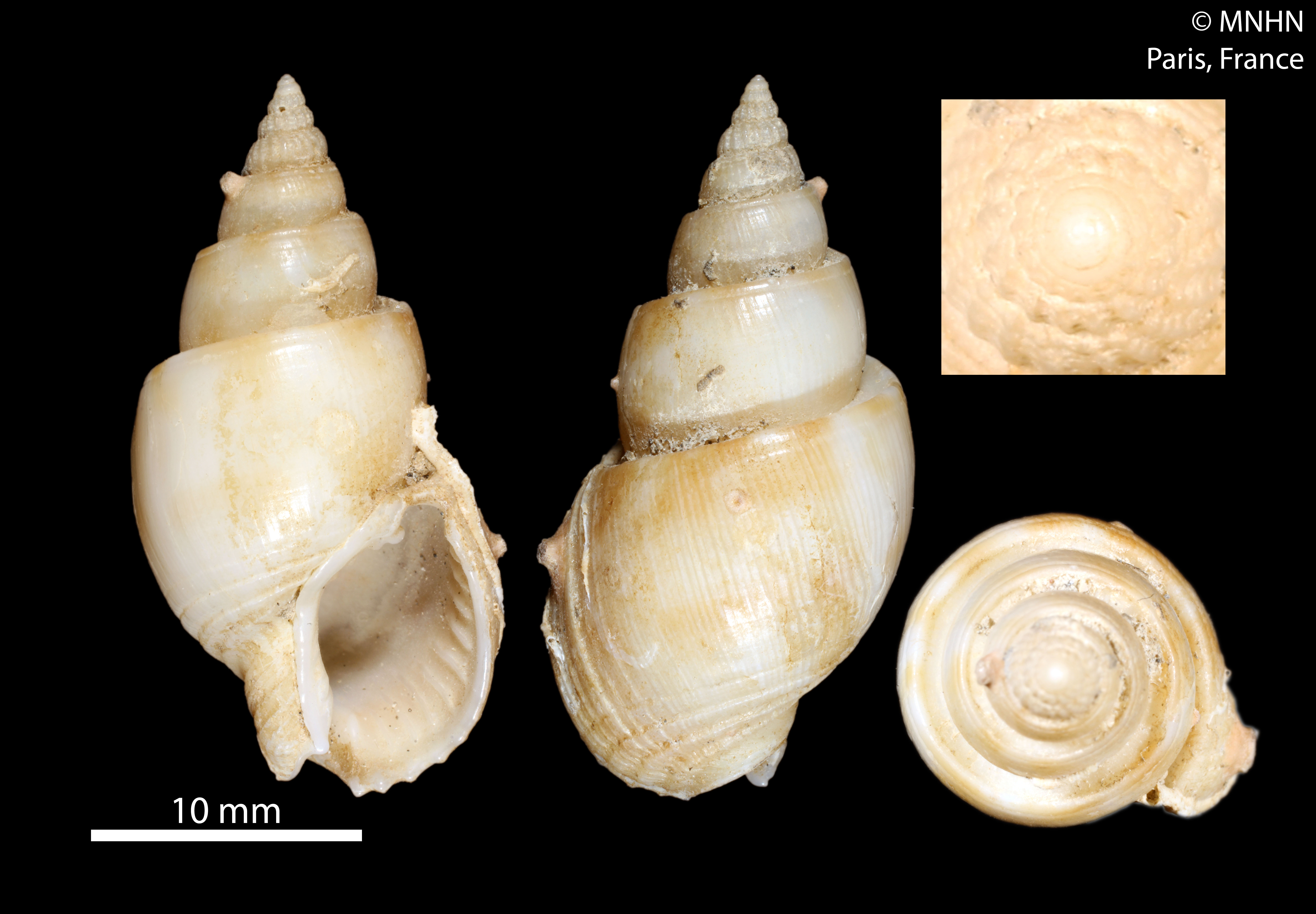
- Shell of Nassarius kooli (paratype at MNHN, Paris)

Scientific classification
- Kingdom: Animalia
- Phylum: Mollusca
- Class: Gastropoda
- Subclass: Caenogastropoda
- Order: Neogastropoda
- Family: Nassariidae
- Genus: Nassarius
- Species: N. kooli

Binomial name
- Nassarius kooli Dekker & Dekkers, 2009

= Nassarius kooli =

Species of gastropod

Nassarius kooli is a species of sea snail, a marine gastropod mollusk in the family Nassariidae, the Nassa mud snails or dog whelks.

== Distribution ==
Nassarius kooli is native to the western pacific, with many specimens having been found in the East China Semen and the Philippines.
