= Orich =

Orich may refer to:

- Steve Orich, American composer
- Orich language, an alternative name for the Even language of Russia

== See also ==
- Sierra de Oriche, a mountain range of Spain
- Orache, a plant
- Orech
