= Oreshkin =

Oreshkin (Russian: Орешкин, from орешек meaning nutlet, a small nut) is a Russian masculine surname, its feminine counterpart is Oreshkina. It may refer to

- Aleksandr Oreshkin, Russian darts player
- Dmitry Oreshkin (born 1953), Russian political scientist

== See also ==
- Orekhov (disambiguation)
