= Orzechówko =

Orzechówko may refer to:

- Orzechówko, Kuyavian-Pomeranian Voivodeship (north-central Poland)
- Orzechówko, Olecko County in Warmian-Masurian Voivodeship (north Poland)
- Orzechówko, Olsztyn County in Warmian-Masurian Voivodeship (north Poland)
