= Orekhov (rural locality) =

Orekhov (Russian: Оре́хов) is the name of several rural localities in Russia:

- Orekhov, Republic of Adygea
- Orekhov, Rostov Oblast
- Orekhov, Volgograd Oblast
