= Orekhov, Volgograd Oblast =

Orekhov Орехов
- Khutor
- Location within Volgograd Oblast Location within Russia
- Coordinates: 49°14′N 43°12′E
- Country: Russia
- Region: Volgograd Oblast
- District: Kletsky District
- Time zone: UTC+4:00

Orekhov (Russian: Орехов) is a rural locality (a khutor) in Perekopskoye Rural Settlement, Kletsky District, Volgograd Oblast, Russia. The population was 150 as of 2010. There are 3 streets.

== Geography ==
Orekhov is located in steppe, on Don Ridge, 20 km southeast of Kletskaya (the district's administrative centre) by road. Kletskaya is the nearest rural locality.
