= Orzechowo =

Orzechowo may refer to:

- Orzechowo, Kuyavian-Pomeranian Voivodeship (north-central Poland)
- Orzechowo, Masovian Voivodeship (east-central Poland)
- Orzechowo, Pomeranian Voivodeship (north Poland)
- Orzechowo, Ełk County in Warmian-Masurian Voivodeship (north Poland)
- Orzechowo, Gmina Dobre Miasto in Warmian-Masurian Voivodeship (north Poland)
- Orzechowo, Gmina Olsztynek in Warmian-Masurian Voivodeship (north Poland)
- Orzechowo, West Pomeranian Voivodeship (north-west Poland)
