= Přestavlky (Chrudim District) =

Přestavky
- Municipality
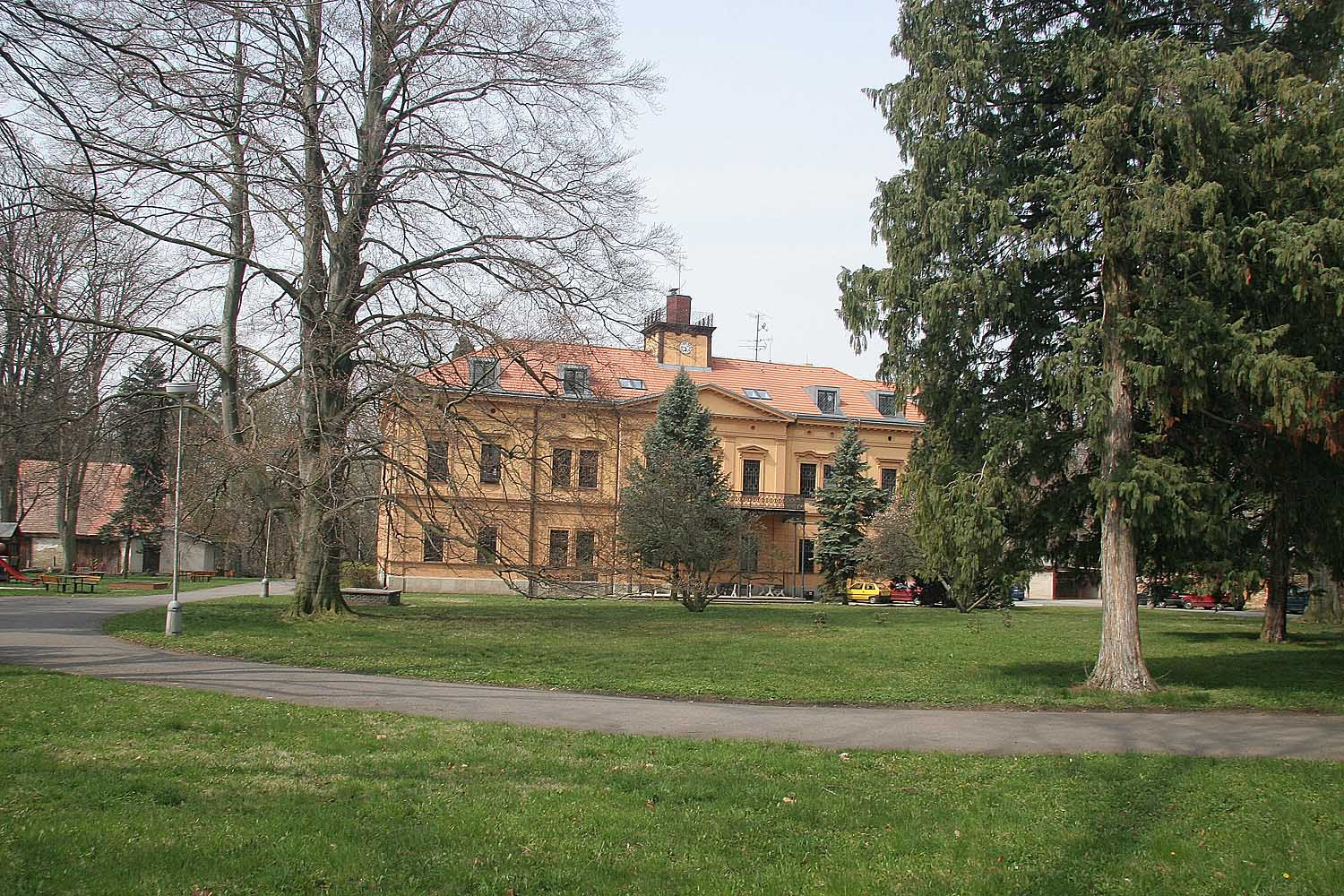
- Přestavky Castle

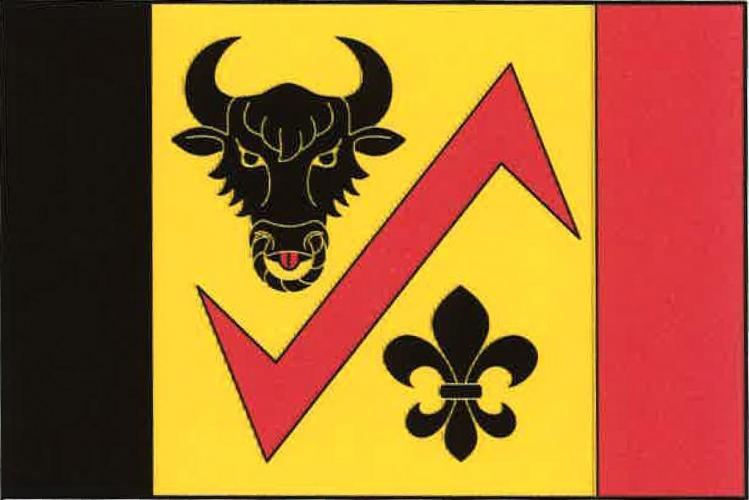
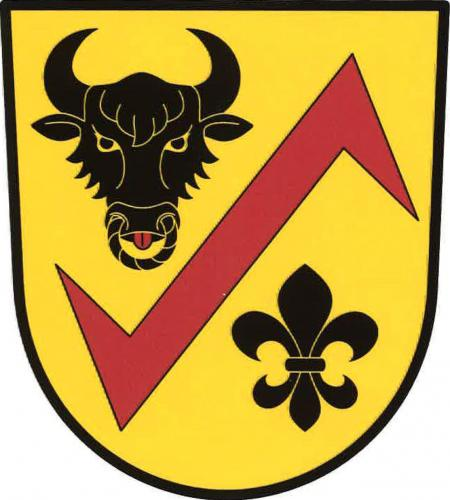
- Flag Coat of arms

- Location in the Czech Republic
- Coordinates: 49°56′17″N 15°55′35″E
- Country: Czech Republic
- Region: Pardubice
- District: Chrudim
- First mentioned: 1319

Area
  - Total: 2.91 km^{2} (1.12 sq mi)
- Elevation: 260 m (850 ft)

Population (2026-01-01)
  - Total: 196
  - Density: 67.4/km^{2} (174/sq mi)
- Time zone: UTC+1 (CET)
  - Summer (DST): UTC+2 (CEST)
- Postal code: 538 62
- Website: www.prestavlky.cz

Přestavlky is a municipality and village in Chrudim District in the Pardubice Region of the Czech Republic. It has about 200 inhabitants.

== Demographics ==
Historical population
Year	Pop.	±%
1869	503	—
1880	502	−0.2%
1890	462	−8.0%
1900	441	−4.5%
1910	459	+4.1%
1921	467	+1.7%
1930	421	−9.9%
1950	340	−19.2%
1961	432	+27.1%
1970	271	−37.3%
1980	212	−21.8%
1991	181	−14.6%
2001	198	+9.4%
2011	243	+22.7%
2021	214	−11.9%
Source: Censuses
