= Orphan bridge =

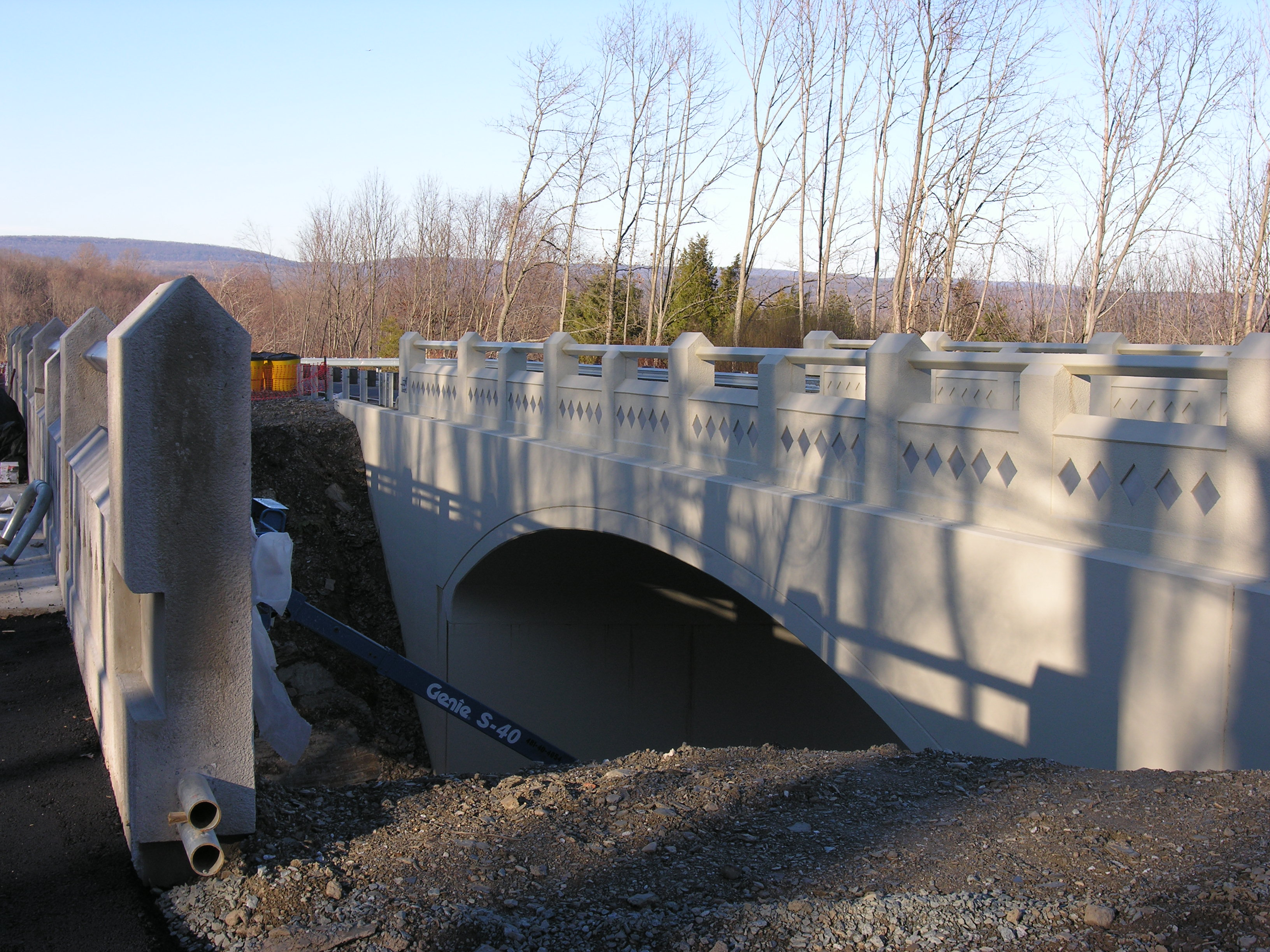
The new bridge over County Route 521 in Blairstown, NJ, shown before it opened in November 2006, is a replica of its 1911 companion to the left that was orphaned at the time of the creation of Conrail in 1976.

An orphan bridge is a roadway bridge that crosses over abandoned railroad rights-of-way and which is no longer owned or maintained by any railroad. Examples include the bridges that crossed over predecessor railroads that were conveyed into Conrail in 1976. At the time, Conrail argued in U.S. court that these overhead bridges were not part of the rail rights-of-way that were conveyed to it at the time of the merger. As the railroads that initially built the bridges and maintained them no longer existed, it was argued, successfully, that, in essence, no legal entity owned them and that, as a result, they were "orphan" bridges. Orphan bridges are sometimes rehabilitated and maintained.

An example of this is the never-used Conrail bridge which parallels Delaware Avenue and crosses U.S. Route 9W in Kingston, NY.
