= Orekhov =

Orekhov (Russian: Орехов) may refer to:

- Orekhov (surname) (feminine Orekhova), a common Russian surname
- Orekhov (rural locality), name of several rural localities in Russia
- Oreshek Fortress, Russia
- The Russian name of Orikhiv, a city in Ukraine

== See also ==
- Orekhovy Island, Russia
