= Orekhov (surname) =

Orekhov (Russian: Оре́хов; masculine) or Orekhova (Оре́хова; feminine) is a Russian-language surname derived from the word орех (orekh, meaning "nut"). Notable people with the surname include:

- Aleksandr Orekhov (footballer, born 1983), Russian football player
- Aleksandr Orekhov (footballer, born 2002), Russian football player
- Inga Orekhova (born 1989), Ukrainian basketball player
- Lev Orekhov (1913-1992), Russian painter
- Lyubov Orekhova, Soviet sprint canoer
- Sergei Orekhov (1935-1998), Soviet/Russian classic guitarist
- Vitaly Orekhov (born 1991), Russian writer
