= Orzechów =

Orzechów may refer to:

- Orzechów, Pabianice County in Łódź Voivodeship (central Poland)
- Orzechów, Radomsko County in Łódź Voivodeship (central Poland)
- Orzechów, Subcarpathian Voivodeship (south-east Poland)
- Orzechów, Masovian Voivodeship (east-central Poland)
- Orzechów, West Pomeranian Voivodeship (north-west Poland)
