= Mořkov =

- Municipality
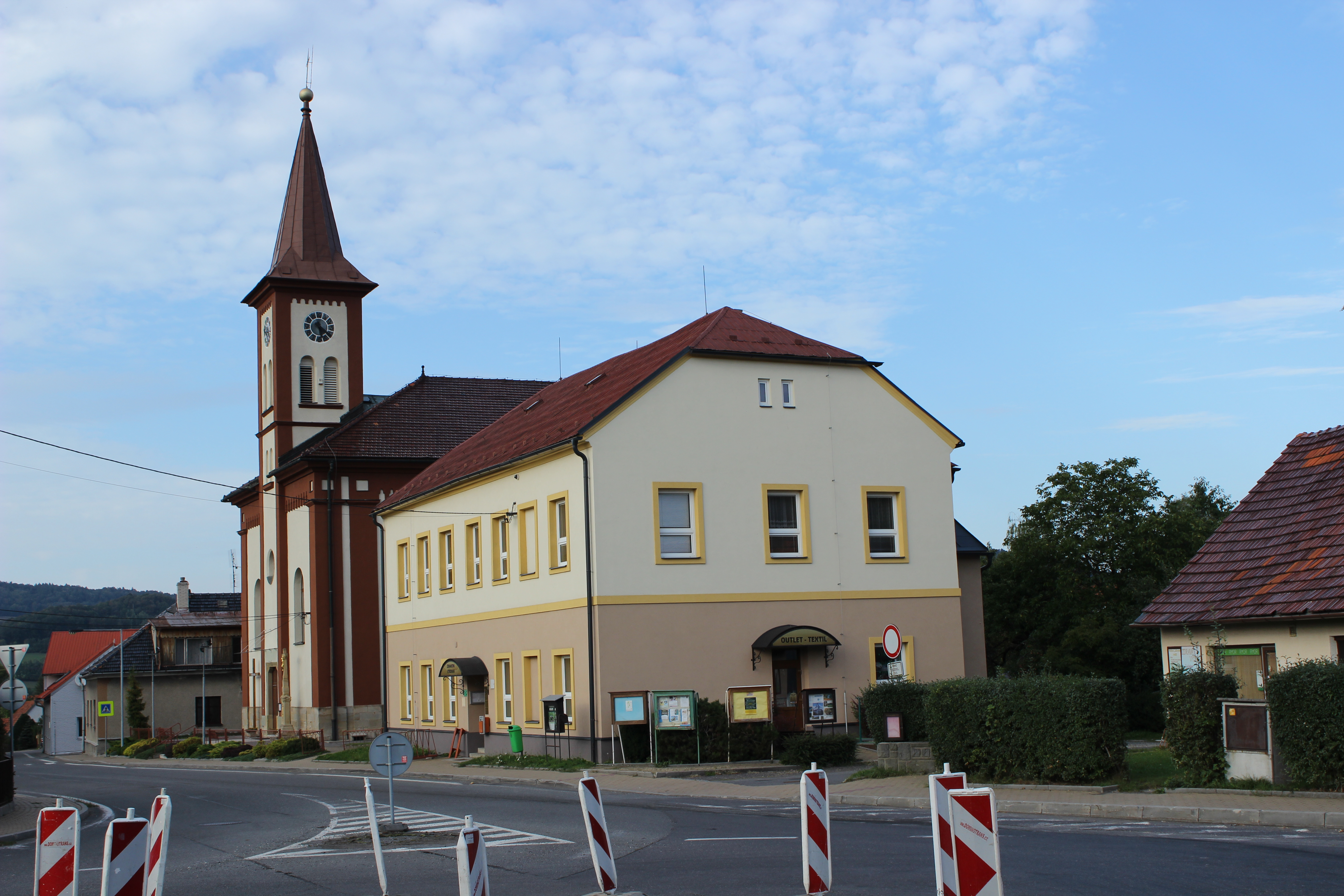
- Centre of Mořkov

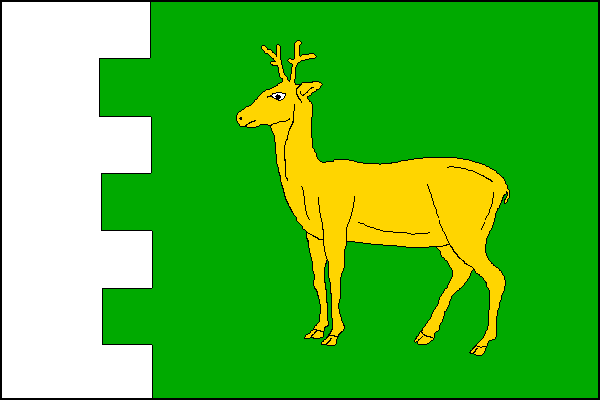
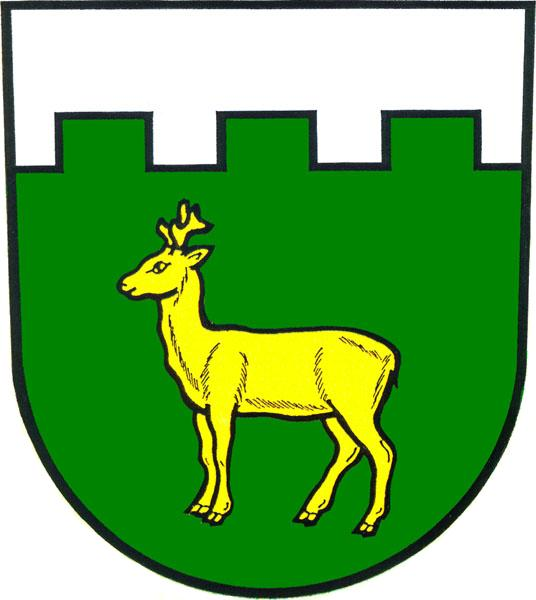
- Flag Coat of arms

- Location in the Czech Republic
- Coordinates: 49°32′13″N 18°3′35″E
- Country: Czech Republic
- Region: Moravian-Silesian
- District: Nový Jičín
- First mentioned: 1411

Area
  - Total: 10.72 km^{2} (4.14 sq mi)
- Elevation: 360 m (1,180 ft)

Population (2026-01-01)
  - Total: 2,369
  - Density: 221.0/km^{2} (572.4/sq mi)
- Time zone: UTC+1 (CET)
  - Summer (DST): UTC+2 (CEST)
- Postal code: 742 72
- Website: www.obec-morkov.cz

Mořkov (German: Murk) is a municipality and village in Nový Jičín District in the Moravian-Silesian Region of the Czech Republic. It has about 2,400 inhabitants.

== Geography ==
Mořkov is located about 7 kilometres (4 mi) south of Nový Jičín and 32 km (20 mi) southwest of Ostrava. The northern part of the municipal territory lies in the Moravian-Silesian Foothills. The southern part lies in the Moravian-Silesian Beskids and also within the Beskydy Protected Landscape Area. The highest point is near the top of the Hodorf hill at 765 m (2,510 ft) above sea level. The stream Králův potok flows through the village. The Jičínka River flows along the northern municipal border.

== History ==
The first written mention of Mořkov is from 1411, when it was part of the Štramberk estate. Later it was annexed to the Nový Jičín estate.

== Demographics ==
Historical population

Year	Pop.	±%
1869	1,315	—
1880	1,371	+4.3%
1890	1,497	+9.2%
1900	1,597	+6.7%
1910	1,700	+6.4%

Year	Pop.	±%
1921	1,625	−4.4%
1930	1,902	+17.0%
1950	1,838	−3.4%
1961	2,234	+21.5%
1970	2,377	+6.4%

Year	Pop.	±%
1980	2,456	+3.3%
1991	2,421	−1.4%
2001	2,374	−1.9%
2011	2,403	+1.2%
2021	2,371	−1.3%

Source: Censuses

== Transport ==
Mořkov is located on the railway line Valašské Meziříčí–Frýdlant nad Ostravicí.

== Sights ==
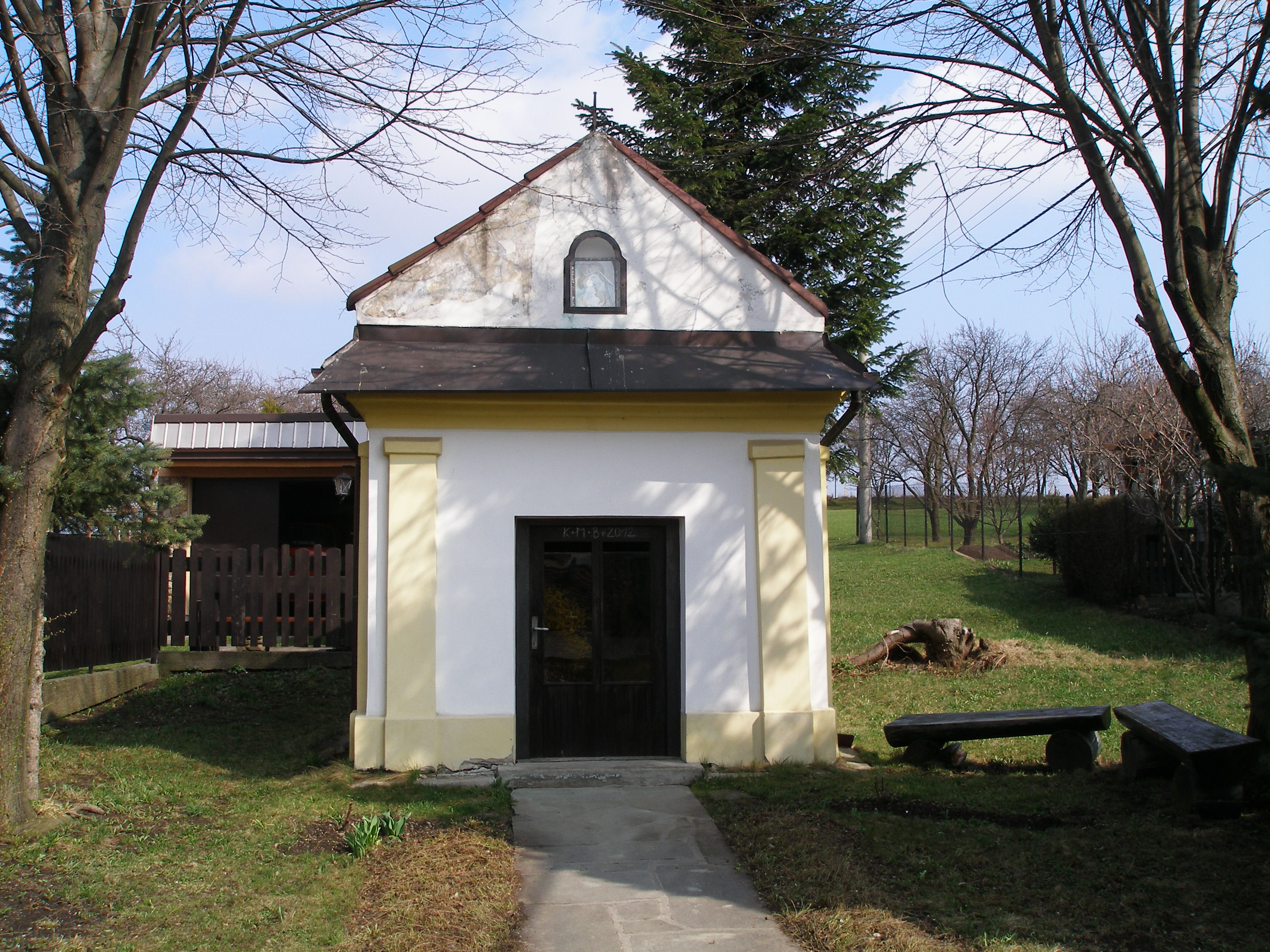
Chapel of Our Lady of Sorrows

The main landmark of Mořkov is the Church of Saint George. It was first documented in 1587. In 1878, it was completely rebuilt into its present form.

The most valuable monument is the Chapel of Our Lady of Sorrows. It was built in the Neoclassical style in 1853.
