= Ořech =

- Municipality
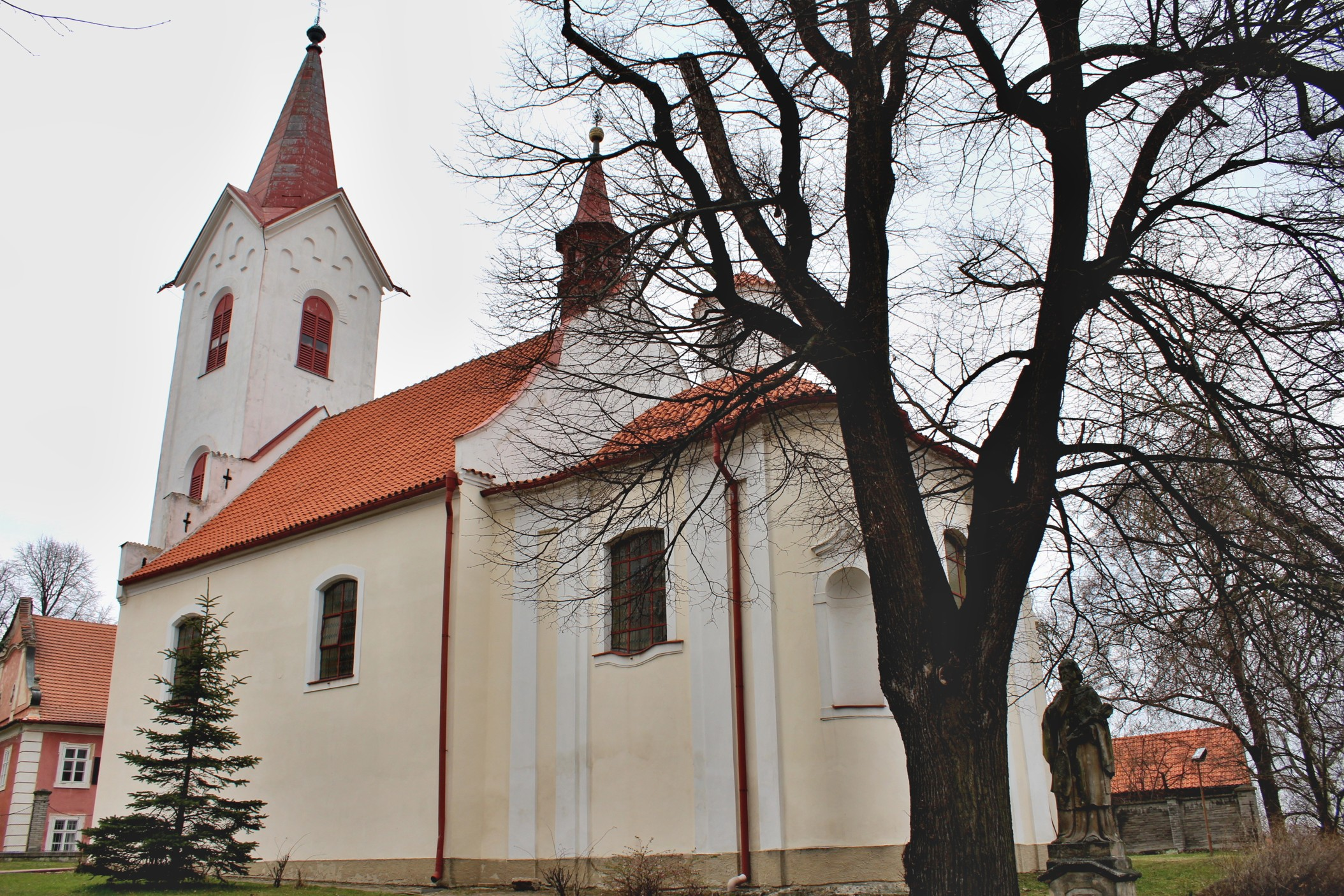
- Church of the Beheading of Saint John the Baptist

- Flag Coat of arms

- Location in the Czech Republic
- Coordinates: 50°1′13″N 14°17′48″E
- Country: Czech Republic
- Region: Central Bohemian
- District: Prague-West
- First mentioned: 993

Area
  - Total: 4.78 km^{2} (1.85 sq mi)
- Elevation: 356 m (1,168 ft)

Population (2026-01-01)
  - Total: 957
  - Density: 200/km^{2} (519/sq mi)
- Time zone: UTC+1 (CET)
  - Summer (DST): UTC+2 (CEST)
- Postal code: 252 25
- Website: www.obecorech.cz

Ořech is a municipality and village in Prague-West District in the Central Bohemian Region of the Czech Republic. It has about 1,000 inhabitants.

== Demographics ==
Historical population
Year	Pop.	±%
1869	346	—
1880	389	+12.4%
1890	452	+16.2%
1900	520	+15.0%
1910	504	−3.1%
1921	514	+2.0%
1930	794	+54.5%
1950	656	−17.4%
1961	665	+1.4%
1970	614	−7.7%
1980	547	−10.9%
1991	491	−10.2%
2001	615	+25.3%
2011	988	+60.7%
2021	1,017	+2.9%
Source: Censuses
