= Orzechówko, Olecko County =

Orzechówko
- Village
- Location within Poland
- Coordinates: 54°1′N 22°23′E
- Country: Poland
- Voivodeship: Warmian-Masurian
- County: Olecko
- Gmina: Świętajno

Orzechówko [ɔʐɛˈxufkɔ] (German Orzechowken, 1925-1945: Nußdorf, German pronunciation: [ˈnʊsdɔʁf]) is a village in the administrative district of Gmina Świętajno, within Olecko County, Warmian-Masurian Voivodeship, in northern Poland.
