= 1941 FC Traktor Stalingrad season =

Traktor Stalingrad
1941 season
- Manager: Aleksandr Keller
- Stadium: Traktor, Stalingrad
- Group A: not completed
- Top goalscorer: League: Viktor Matveyev (8); All: Viktor Matveyev (8)
- Highest home attendance: 12,000
- Lowest home attendance: 3,000
- Average home league attendance: 7,000
Home colours	Away colours

The 1941 Traktor Stalingrad season was the 6th season in USSR championships.

== Squad ==
Note: Flags indicate national team as defined under FIFA eligibility rules; some limited exceptions apply. Players may hold more than one non-FIFA nationality.

No.	Pos.	Nation	Player
—	GK	URS	Vasili Yermasov
—	GK	URS	Arkadi Usov
—	DF	URS	Konstantin Belikov (captain)
—	DF	URS	Sergei Plonski
—	DF	URS	Nikolai Pokrovski
—	DF	URS	Ivan Tyazhlov
—	MF	URS	Aleksandr Grigoryev
—	MF	URS	Aleksandr Rudin
—	MF	URS	Yevgeni Shpinev

No.	Pos.	Nation	Player
—	FW	URS	Khanon Diner
—	FW	URS	Valentin Liventsev
—	FW	URS	Vasili Makarov
—	FW	URS	Viktor Matveyev
—	FW	URS	Sergei Papkov
—	FW	URS	Ivan Serov
—	FW	URS	Viktor Shvedchenko
—	FW	URS	Leonid Sheremet
—	FW	URS	Mikhail Yanovski

== Transfers ==
In: Note: Flags indicate national team as defined under FIFA eligibility rules; some limited exceptions apply. Players may hold more than one non-FIFA nationality.

No.	Pos.	Nation	Player
—	DF	URS	Sergei Plonski (from (Soviet Union) Torpedo Gorky)
—	MF	URS	Yevgeni Shpinev (from (Soviet Union) Torpedo Gorky)
—	FW	URS	Leonid Sheremet (from (Soviet Union) Sudostroitel Mykolaiv)
—	FW	URS	Sergei Papkov (from (Soviet Union) Metallurg Moscow)
—	FW	URS	Khanon Diner (from (Soviet Union) Dynamo Dnipropetrovsk)
—	FW	URS	Vasili Makarov (from (Soviet Union) Dynamo Kharkiv)
—	FW	URS	Viktor Shvedchenko (from (Soviet Union) Zenit Stalingrad)

Out: Note: Flags indicate national team as defined under FIFA eligibility rules; some limited exceptions apply. Players may hold more than one non-FIFA nationality.

No.	Pos.	Nation	Player
—	DF	URS	Yegor Borisov
—	FW	URS	Georgi Ivanov (to (Soviet Union) Profsoyuzy-1 Moscow)
—	FW	URS	Sergei Kolesnikov
—	FW	URS	Aleksandr Ponomarev (to (Soviet Union) Profsoyuzy-1 Moscow)
—	FW	URS	Vasili Provornov (to (Soviet Union) Profsoyuzy-1 Moscow)
—	FW	URS	Sergei Protsenko (to (Soviet Union) Profsoyuzy-1 Moscow)
—	FW	URS	Aleksandr Sapronov
—	FW	URS	Boris Terentyev

== Competitions ==
=== Friendlies ===
14 April 1941	Sudostroitel Mykolaiv	v	Traktor Stalingrad	Mykolaiv

24 April 1941	Traktor Stalingrad	4 – 2	Dynamo Stalingrad	Stalingrad
	1:0 Matveyev 7'; 2:1 Shvedchenko; 3:2 Liventsev ?' (pen.); 4:2 Yanovski 90'		1:1 Kireyev; 2:2 ?	Stadium: Traktor

=== USSR Championship. Group A ===
27 April 1941 1	Traktor Stalingrad	2 – 3	Dynamo Kyiv	Stalingrad
	1:0 Liventsev 26' (pen.); 2:1 Liventsev 45'	Summary	1:1 Balakin 32'; 2:2 Onishchenko 56'; 2:3 Onishchenko 60'	Stadium: Metallurg; Attendance: 6,000; Referee: Vyacheslav Morgunov (Moscow)

3 May 1941 2	Traktor Stalingrad	2 – 1	Zenit Leningrad	Stalingrad
	1:0 Matveyev 37'; 2:0 Matveyev 49'	Summary	2:1 Levin-Kogan 65'	Stadium: Traktor; Attendance: 3,000; Referee: Kirillov (Stalingrad)

11 May 1941 3	Traktor Stalingrad	1 – 1	Spartak Leningrad	Stalingrad
	1:0 Diner 80'	Summary	1:1 Smagin 82'	Stadium: Traktor; Attendance: 7,000; Referee: Viktor Arkhipov (Moscow)

18 May 1941 4	Dinamo Tbilisi	1 – 1	Traktor Stalingrad	Tbilisi
	1:0 Paichadze 13'	Summary	Matveyev (penalty missed) 27'; 1:1 Matveyev 80'	Stadium: Dinamo; Referee: Ivan Privalov (Kharkiv)

25 May 1941 5	Traktor Stalingrad	1 – 1	Profsoyuzy-1 Moscow	Stalingrad
	1:1 Papkov 9'	Summary	0:1 Stupakov 4'	Stadium: Traktor; Attendance: 12,000; Referee: Viktor Arkhipov (Moscow)

28 May 1941 6	Traktor Stalingrad	1 – 1	Spartak Odessa	Stalingrad
	1:1 Matveyev 82'	Summary	0:1 Shatski 30'	Stadium: Traktor; Attendance: 8,000; Referee: Mikhail Dmitriev (Moscow)

1 June 1941 7	Traktor Stalingrad	1 – 1	Dynamo Leningrad	Stalingrad
	1:1 Sheremet 68'	Summary	0:1 Viktorov 10'	Stadium: Traktor; Attendance: 7,000; Referee: Sergei Rudnev (Moscow)

5 June 1941 8	Traktor Stalingrad	1 – 3	Spartak Moscow	Stalingrad
	1:0 Serov 6'	Summary	1:1 A.Sokolov 38'; 1:2 Morozov 53'; 1:3 Kornilov 58'	Stadium: Traktor; Attendance: 9,000; Referee: G.Gritsuk (Kharkiv)

10 June 1941 9	Traktor Stalingrad	1 – 0	Spartak Kharkiv	Stalingrad
	1:0 Matveyev 72' (pen.)	Summary		Stadium: Traktor; Attendance: 4,000; Referee: K.Terekhov (Moscow)

15 June 1941 10	Krasnaya Armiya Moscow	1 – 1	Traktor Stalingrad	Moscow
	1:0 Karchevski 13'	Summary	1:1 Matveyev 38'; Matveyev (penalty missed)	Stadium: Dynamo; Attendance: 18,000; Referee: I.Averkin (Leningrad)

19 June 1941 11	Dynamo Moscow	1 – 1	Traktor Stalingrad	Moscow
	1:0 Yakushin 34'; Solovyov (penalty missed) 55'	Summary	1:1 Liventsev 56' (pen.)	Stadium: Dynamo; Attendance: 30,000; Referee: T.Soshenko (Kharkiv)

24 June 1941 12	Stakhanovets Stalino	2 – 3	Traktor Stalingrad	Stalino
	1:0 Bikezin 8' (pen.); 2:2 Nesmekha 56'	Summary	1:1 Matveyev 23'; 1:2 Matveyev 49'; 2:3 Rudin 82'	Stadium: Stakhanovets; Attendance: 10,000

Note: The championship was not completed because of the Great Patriotic War.

==== Table ====
Pos	Team	Pld	W	D	L	GF	GA	GD	Pts
1	Dynamo Moscow	10	6	3	1	28	12	+16	15
2	Dinamo Tbilisi	10	6	3	1	22	13	+9	15
3	Dynamo Leningrad	11	5	4	2	20	11	+9	14
4	Traktor Stalingrad	12	3	7	2	16	16	0	13
5	Stakhanovets Stalino	11	6	0	5	13	13	0	12
6	Krasnaya Armiya Moscow	9	5	1	3	15	13	+2	11
7	Spartak Moscow	9	4	2	3	17	12	+5	10
8	Dynamo Kyiv	9	4	2	3	16	14	+2	10
9	Profsoyuzy-2 Moscow	10	3	4	3	11	10	+1	10
10	Spartak Odessa	10	3	2	5	16	22	−6	8
11	Zenit Leningrad	8	2	3	3	12	14	−2	7
12	Spartak Leningrad	9	1	4	4	8	16	−8	6
13	Dinamo Minsk	10	3	0	7	10	21	−11	6
14	Spartak Kharkiv	9	2	1	6	7	19	−12	5
15	Profsoyuzy-1 Moscow	9	1	2	6	10	15	−5	4

== Statistics ==
=== Squad statistics ===
==== Appearances and goals ====
No.	Pos	Nat	Player	Total		USSR Championship	
No.	Pos	Nat	Player	Apps	Goals	Apps	Goals
	GK	(Soviet Union) URS	Vasili Yermasov	8	-9	8	-9
	GK	(Soviet Union) URS	Arkadi Usov	5	-7	5	-7
	DF	(Soviet Union) URS	Sergei Plonski	10	0	10	0
	DF	(Soviet Union) URS	Konstantin Belikov	9	0	9	0
	DF	(Soviet Union) URS	Ivan Tyazhlov	9	0	9	0
	MF	(Soviet Union) URS	Aleksandr Rudin	11	1	11	1
	MF	(Soviet Union) URS	Aleksandr Grigoryev	11	0	11	0
	MF	(Soviet Union) URS	Nikolai Pokrovski	10	0	10	0
	MF	(Soviet Union) URS	Yevgeni Shpinev	3	0	3	0
	FW	(Soviet Union) URS	Leonid Sheremet	12	1	12	1
	FW	(Soviet Union) URS	Viktor Matveyev	11	8	11	8
	FW	(Soviet Union) URS	Vasili Makarov	11	0	11	0
	FW	(Soviet Union) URS	Ivan Serov	9	1	9	1
	FW	(Soviet Union) URS	Sergei Papkov	9	1	9	1
	FW	(Soviet Union) URS	Valentin Liventsev	6	3	6	3
	FW	(Soviet Union) URS	Khanon Diner	5	1	5	1
	FW	(Soviet Union) URS	Viktor Shvedchenko	3	0	3	0
	FW	(Soviet Union) URS	Mikhail Yanovski	2	0	2	0

==== Top scorers ====
Player	USSR Championship	Total
Viktor Matveyev	8	8
Valentin Liventsev	3	3
Khanon Diner	1	1
Sergei Papkov	1	1
Ivan Serov	1	1
Aleksandr Rudin	1	1
Leonid Sheremet	1	1
Total	16	16

== General statistics ==
Tournament	Pld	W	D	L	GF	GA	GD	YC	RC	Pts
USSR Championship	12	3	7	2	16	16	0	?	?	13/24 (54,2 %)
Всего	12	3	7	2	16	16	0	?	?	13/24 (54,2 %)

== Sources ==
- Летопись областного футбола. Царицын. Сталинград. Волгоград. 1909-1962 [Chronicles of the regional football. Tsaritsyn. Stalingrad. Volgograd. 1909-1962] (in Russian). 2000. p. 238.
- Sklyarenko, Aleksandr (2000). "РОТОР" от сталинградского "Трактора" до наших дней. Футбольные хроники [Rotor from Traktor Stalingrad to this day. Football chronicles] (in Russian). Volgograd: Volgogradskaya pravda. p. 288. Archived from the original on 2014-02-21.
