= Orekhovo =

Orekhovo may refer to:

- List of localities in Russia named Orekhovo
- Orekhovo (Moscow Metro), a station on the Zamoskvoretskaya Line of the Moscow Metro
- KS Orekhovo, a Russian football team
- Orikhiv, a city in Zaporizhzhia Oblast, southern Ukraine

== See also ==
- Orekhovo-Borisovo Severnoye District, a district of Southern Administrative Okrug of Moscow, Russia
- Orekhovo-Borisovo Metochion, a metochion of the Patriarch of Moscow
- Orekhovo-Borisovo Yuzhnoye District, a district of Southern Administrative Okrug of Moscow, Russia
- Orekhovo-Zuyevo, a city in Moscow Oblast, Russia

- Orekhovo, Pokrovsky Uyezd, Vladimir Governorate, an historic village which was merged into Orekhovo-Zuyevo in 1917
