= Orekhovo, Pokrovsky Uyezd, Vladimir Governorate =

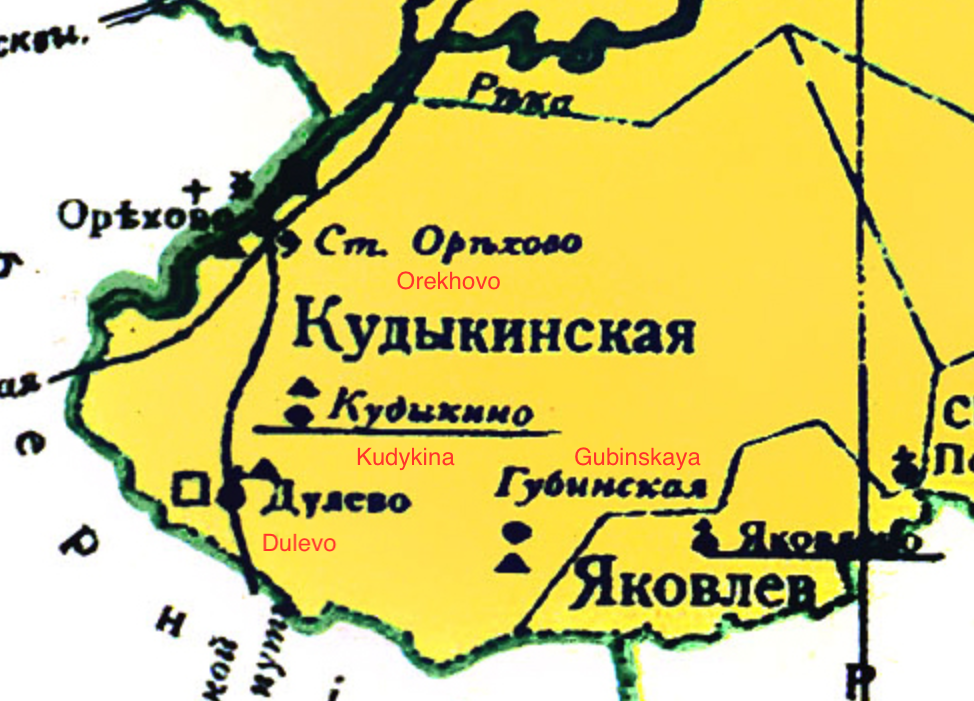
Kudykinskaya volost from map of 1898

Orekhovo was a village located in Kudykinskaya volost, Pokrovsky Uyezd, Vladimir Governorate, Imperial Russia. Since 1917 it has been part of the city of Orekhovo-Zuyevo. The town played a significant part in the development of the textile sector in Imperial Russia and football in Imperial Russia. The village developed close to Nikolskoye which had been developed as a mill town by the Morozov dynasty.

== Demographics ==
The village was originally home to merchants and clergy. However, by the end of the nineteenth century the village had become industrialised, with accommodation built for factory workers.

Date	Population
1859	77
1897	7,219
1914	21,593

=== Anglichanka ===
Part of this development was called Anglichanka (Russian: Англичанка, meaning Englishwoman). This became the home of English technicians and managers who were brought to the area by the Morozovs. The three Charnock brothers, – James Charnock, Clement Charnock and Harry Charnock were amongst this community and their family is regarded as pioneers of Russian football. This English community started to play football amongst themselves, but soon attracted the interest of the local Russian people, and then with the support of Ivan Vikulovich Morozov KS Orekhovo was established in 1910. Little remains of this settlement, located at Ulitsa Stepana Terent'yeva, Orekhovo-Zuyevo. The houses were burnt down and the only remnant is the bowl of a fountain in a personal plot which belonged to the Charnoks.
