= Charnock =

Charnock may refer to:

== Places ==
- Heath Charnock, village in Chorley
- Charnock, Sheffield, suburb of Sheffield
- Charnock Richard, village in Chorley

== People ==
- Charnock (surname)
