= Zuevo =

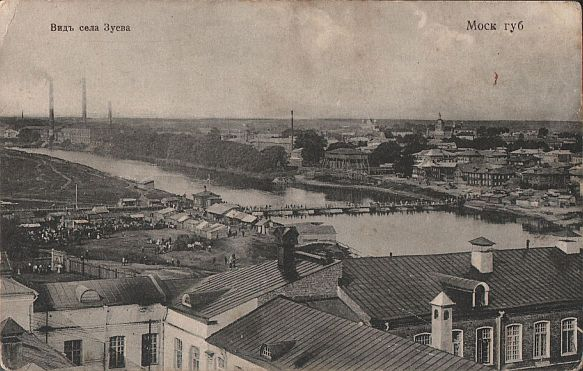

Zuevo was a historic village in Bogorodsky Uyezd, Moscow Governorate, Imperial Russia. It was the administrative centre of Zuevskaya volost. Since 1917 it has been part of the city of Orekhovo-Zuyevo. It was the birthplace of Savva Vasilyevich Morozov and Semyon Grigorievich Zimin, both peasants who became industrialists ensuring Zuevo play an important role in the industrialisation of Imperial Russia.

== Early development ==
The village belonged to the Vsevolozhsky familyThe village was originally an area of arable agriculture. In the Economic Notes of 1760 it states of the population "they plow the land all over, and they also use carts to hire them to different cities." However, from 1771 when two peasants gained permission to start silk weaving in five locations, the village played a part in the developing textile sector in Imperial Russia. This contributed to the expansion of the population:

Date	Population
Mid 17th Century	38
1717	138
1762	344
1795	374
1836	528

By the mid 1790s there were 9 factories employing 63 workers. The largest was that of Feodor Kononov, who employed 15 workers. He lent one his workers, Savva Morozov, 1,500 to buy himself out of military service. Morozov repaid the debt in two years.

== Creation of Orekhovo-Zuyevo ==
Following the February Revolution of 1917 a soviet of workers deputies was created linking the villages of Orekhovo, Zuevo and Nikolskoye in March 1917. It was one of the first soviets to be dominated by the Bolsheviks. By May 1917 this soviet had taken over the factories of the Morozovs. The Soviet called on the Provisional government to unify the three settlements as the city of Orekhovo-Zuyevo, which they did on 3 June, 1917.
