= Aleksei Vanyushin =

Russian footballer

Personal information
- Full name: Aleksei Valentinovich Vanyushin
- Date of birth: 3 January 1982 (age 44)
- Place of birth: Orekhovo-Zuyevo, Russian SFSR
- Height: 1.75 m (5 ft 9 in)
- Position: Midfielder

Senior career*
Years	Team	Apps	(Gls)
1998	FC Spartak-Orekhovo Orekhovo-Zuyevo	0	(0)
1999–2000	FC Spartak-2 Moscow	34	(0)
2001	FC Spartak Moscow	0	(0)
2001	FC Metallurg Krasnoyarsk	11	(0)
2002	FC Mostransgaz Gazoprovod	32	(7)
2003–2004	FC Krylia Sovetov Samara	0	(0)
2004	FC Fakel Voronezh	25	(4)
2006	FC Amur Blagoveshchensk	29	(2)
2007	FC Znamya Truda Orekhovo-Zuyevo	27	(0)
2008	FC Atyrau	14	(0)
2008–2010	FC Znamya Truda Orekhovo-Zuyevo	69	(3)
2011–2012	FC Saturn-2 Moscow Oblast	35	(1)
2012–2014	FC Znamya Truda Orekhovo-Zuyevo	43	(1)

International career
2002–2003	Russia U-21	7	(0)
- * Club domestic league appearances and goals

Aleksei Valentinovich Vanyushin (Russian: Алексей Валентинович Ванюшин; born 3 January 1982) is a Russian former professional footballer.

== Club career ==
He played in the Russian Football National League for FC Metallurg Krasnoyarsk in 2001.

He made his debut for FC Krylia Sovetov Samara on 2 April 2003 in a Russian Premier League Cup game against FC Rotor Volgograd.
