= Charnock (surname) =

Charnock is an English locational surname. It originates from two places, Charnock Richard and Heath Charnock, both in Lancashire.

The name refers to:

- Anne Charnock, science fiction author
- Dr. Christina Comty-Nygren (née Charnock) (1928–2007), English nephrologist, accomplished researcher, and professor of medicine at McGill University, the University of Pittsburgh, and the University of Minnesota
- Clement Charnock (1865–1950), mechanical engineer who worked in Russia
- Harry Charnock, brother of Clement and pioneer of football in Russia
- Henry Charnock (1920–1997), English meteorologist
- James Charnock, English engineer and entrepreneur
- Job Charnock (c. 1630 – c. 1693), British trade agent in India; said to be the founder of Calcutta
- Kieran Charnock (born 1984), English football player
- Lewis Charnock (born 1994), English rugby player
- Mark Charnock (born 1968), English actor
- Phil Charnock (born 1975), English football player
- Richard Stephen Charnock (1820–1905), English lawyer, topographer, and antiquary
- Robert Charnock (1663–1696), English conspirator in the plot to assassinate William III
- Roger Charnock (1588–1645), English politician
- Stephen Charnock (1628–1680), English Puritan Presbyterian clergyman
- Thomas Charnock (1516–1581), English alchemist and occultist
- Thomas Charnock (MP) (1587–1648), English politician
