= Bogorodsky Uyezd =

Subdivision of the Russian Empire

Bogorodsky Uyezd (Russian: Богородский уезд) was one of the subdivisions of the Moscow Governorate of the Russian Empire. It was situated in the eastern part of the governorate. Its administrative centre was Bogorodsk (Noginsk).

== Demographics ==
At the time of the Russian Empire Census of 1897, Bogorodsky Uyezd had a population of 222,341. Of these, 99.7% spoke Russian, 0.1% Tatar and 0.1% German as their native language.

== Industrialisation ==
In 1891 it was recorded by Alexander Ivanovich Voeykov that there were 262 whose annual production was equal to 28,912,000 rubles. Zuevo was reported as the most important factory centre in the Uyezd, described as being on the border of the Vladimir Governorate with Orekhov, another mill town located on the other side of the Klyazma river.
