= Eric Stenbock =

Baltic Swedish poet and novelist (1860–1895)

Graf Eric Stenbock
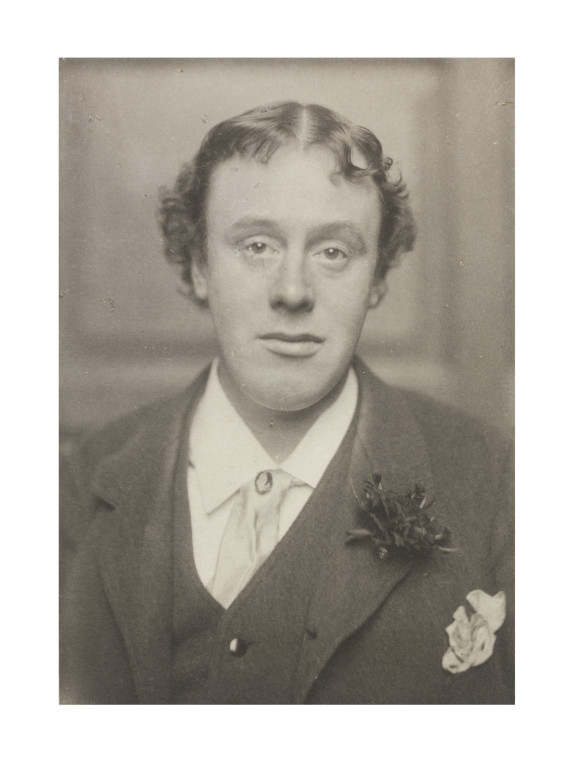
- Stenbock in 1886
- Born: 12 March 1860; Cheltenham, Gloucestershire, England, Great Britain
- Died: 26 April 1895 (aged 35); Brighton, Brighton and Hove, East Sussex, Great Britain
- Occupations: Poet, writer
- Parents: Count Erich Stenbock (father); Lucy Sophia Frerichs (mother)

Graf Eric Stanislaus (or Stanislaus Eric) Stenbock (12 March [O.S. 29 February] 1860 – 26 April [O.S. 14 April] 1895) was a Baltic Swedish poet and writer of macabre fantastic fiction.

== Life ==
Stenbock was the count of Bogesund and the heir to an estate near Kolga in Estonia. He was the son of Lucy Sophia Frerichs, the daughter and heiress of Johann Andreas Frerichs, a Manchester cotton tycoon, and Count Erich Stenbock, of a distinguished Swedish noble family of the Baltic German House of nobility in Reval. The family rose to prominence in the service of King Gustav Vasa: Catherine Stenbock was the third and last consort of Gustav Vasa and Queen consort of Sweden between 1552 and 1560. Stenbock's great-grandfather was Baron Friedrich von Stuart (1761–1842) from Courland. Immanuel Kant was a great-great-granduncle of Stenbock.

Stenbock's father died suddenly while he was one year old; his properties were held in trust for him by his grandfather Magnus. Eric's maternal grandfather died while Eric was quite young, also, in 1866, leaving him another trust fund.

Stenbock attended Balliol College in Oxford but never completed his studies. While at Oxford, Eric was deeply influenced by the homosexual Pre-Raphaelite artist and illustrator Simeon Solomon. He is also said to have had a relationship with the composer and conductor Norman O'Neill and with other "young men".

In Oxford, Stenbock also converted to Roman Catholicism taking for himself the name Stanislaus. Some years later Eric also admitted to having tried a different religion every week in Oxford. At the end of his life, he seemed to have developed a syncretist religion containing elements of Catholicism, Buddhism and idolatry.

In 1885 Count Magnus died, upon which Stenbock, as the oldest living male relative, acceded to the status of Count and to the possession of the family's estates in Estonia. Eric traveled to and lived in Kolga for a year and a half; he returned to England in the summer of 1887, during which time he sank deeper into alcoholism and drug addiction.

Stenbock behaved eccentrically. He kept snakes, lizards, salamanders and toads in his room, and had a "zoo" in his garden containing a reindeer, a fox, and a bear. When he traveled, he invariably brought with him a dog, a monkey, and a life-sized doll. This doll he referred to as "le Petit Comte" ("the little Count") and told everyone that it was his son; he insisted it be brought to him daily, and—when it was absent—he asked about its health. (Stenbock's family believed an unscrupulous Jesuit had been given large amounts of money by the Count for the "education" of this doll.)

== Work ==
Stenbock lived in England most of his life, and wrote his works in the English language. He published a number of books of verse during his lifetime, including Love, Sleep, and Dreams (1881) and Rue, Myrtle, and Cypress (1883). In 1894, Stenbock published The Shadow of Death, his last volume of verse, and Studies of Death, a collection of short stories.

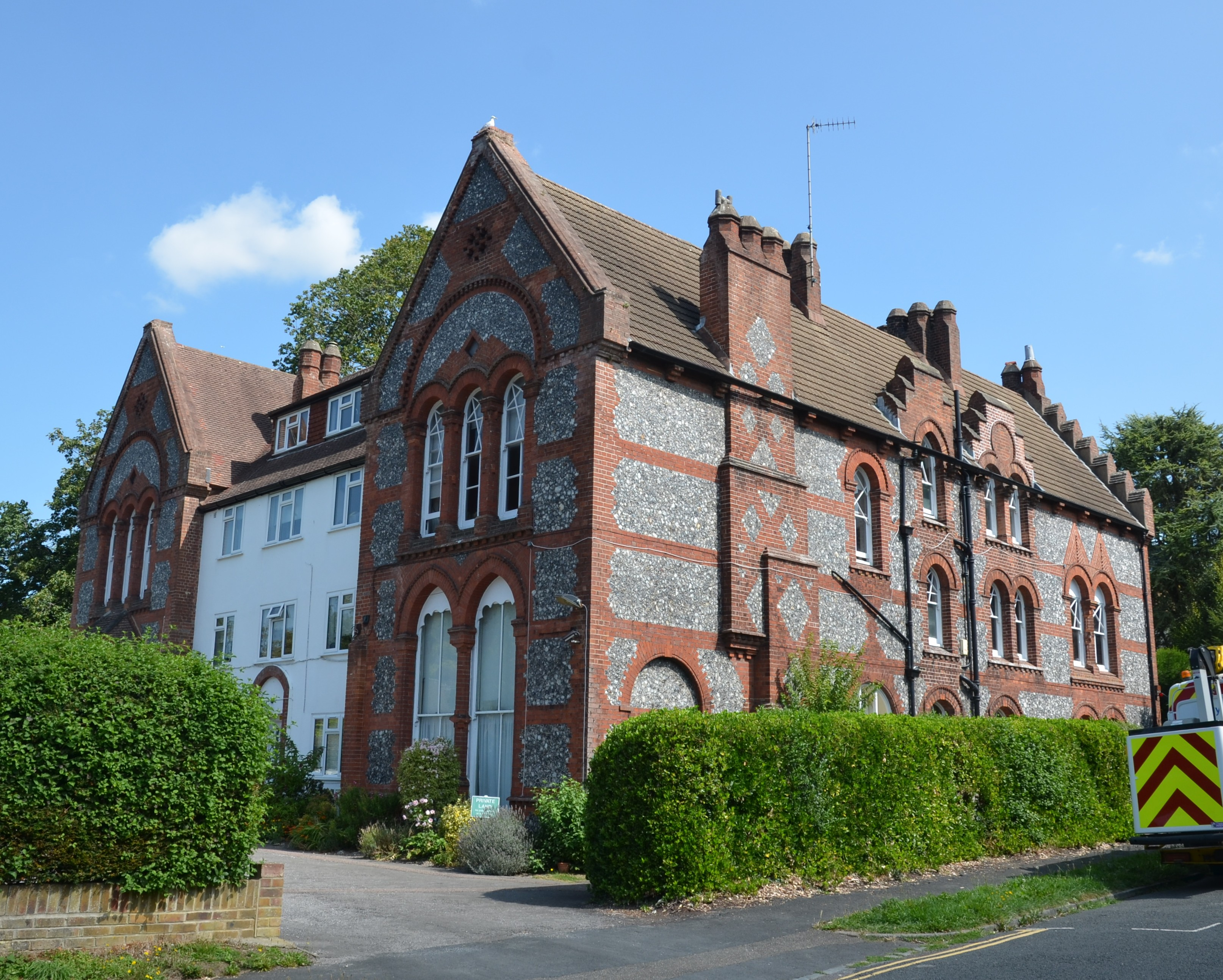
Withdean Hall, Brighton, home of Stenbock's mother and stepfather, and the house where he died.

== Death ==
On 26 April 1895 Stenbock died from cirrhosis of the liver at his mother's home, Withdeane Hall, near Brighton; his death went unnoticed in the press, aside from a brief mention in The Times (30 April 1895). Stenbock had named More Adey as his literary executor. On 1 May the burial service was held in the Brighton Extra Mural Cemetery.

== Legacy ==
The band Current 93 made an album of the same name of incidental music inspired by Stenbock's Faust story. Stenbock's legacy is supported by the invitation-only Stenbock Society, notable like Stenbock himself for its infrequent activity.

Marc Almond and Michael Cashmore released the two-track CD Gabriel & The Lunatic Lover in 2008 with two songs based on Stenbock's poems by the same name. This was followed in 2011 by the album Feasting with Panthers which included two more adaptations, "Sonnet XI" and "The Song of the Unwept Tear". All four poems were adapted and translated by Jeremy Reed.

Strange Attractor Press published a collection of Stenbock's short stories, poems and essays, Of Kings and Things, in 2019.

== Works ==
=== Poetry ===
- Love, sleep & dreams : a volume of verse. - Oxford : A. Thomas Shrimpton & Son; Simpkin Marshall & Co, 1881?
- Myrtle, rue and cypress : a book of poems, songs and sonnets. - London : [privately printed by] Hatchards, 1883
- The shadow of death : poems, songs, and sonnets. - London : The Leadenhall Press, 1893

=== Short story collections ===
- Studies of death : romantic tales (London : David Nutt, 1894)

== Biographies and other ==
- Adlard, John. Stenbock, Yeats and the Nineties; with an hitherto unpublished essay on Stenbock by Arthur Symons and a bibliography by Timothy d'Arch Smith. - London : Cecil & Amelia Woolf, 1969
- Costelloe, Mary. Christmas with Count Stenbock / [edited by] John Adlard; frontispiece by Max Beerbohm. -London : Enitharmon, 1980. - Contains letters by Mary Costelloe
- Reed, Jeremy. A hundred years of disappearance : Count Eric Stenbock. - [Great Britain? : J. Reed, 1995]
