= Semyon Grigorievich Zimin =

Russian Entrepreneur

Semyon Grigorievich Zimin (1760, Zuevo – 1840) was a Russian entrepreneur and founder of the Zimin dynasty. He was born a serf owned by the landowner Ryumin.

He married Anastasia Grigorievna, with whom he had five sons: Kipriyan, Ivan, Pavel, Nikita, and Stepan. They all became involved in the family business.

Semyon travelled to Moscow three or four times a year, selling silk goods to wholesalers in Kitay-gorod, the main commercial district in Moscow.
