= Friedrich von Stuart =

Baron Friedrich von Stuart (1761–1842) was a Courland nobleman and landowner. He was married to Henrietta Kant (1783–1850), a niece of Immanuel Kant.

They are ancestors of Count Eric Stenbock, the ambassador Henning von Wistinghausen, Baron Dmitri Stuart, an ambassador of Russia to Romania and Denmark and Renārs Kaupers.
