= Andrei Martynov (footballer) =

Turkmenistani footballer

Personal information
- Full name: Andrei Vasilyevich Martynov
- Date of birth: 17 September 1965 (age 61)
- Height: 1.82 m (6 ft 0 in)
- Position: Defender

Senior career*
Years	Team	Apps	(Gls)
1988–1991	Köpetdag Aşgabat	155	(9)
1992	FC Torpedo Moscow	20	(0)
1993	Köpetdag Aşgabat		
1994	FC Erzu Grozny	18	(2)
1995–1997	FC Shinnik Yaroslavl	99	(8)
1998	FC Chkalovets Novosibirsk	15	(1)
1999	FC Spartak-Orekhovo Orekhovo-Zuyevo	21	(0)
2000	FC Sibiryak Bratsk	21	(1)

International career
1993	Turkmenistan	4	(0)
- * Club domestic league appearances and goals

Andrei Vasilyevich Martynov (Russian: Андрей Васильевич Мартынов; born 17 September 1965) is a former Turkmenistani professional footballer.

== Club career ==
He made his professional debut in the Soviet Second League in 1988 for Köpetdag Aşgabat. He played 1 game in the UEFA Cup 1992–93 for FC Torpedo Moscow.

== Honours ==
- Turkmenistan Higher League champion: 1993.
