= Konstantin Belikov =

USSR football player

Personal information
- Full name: Konstantin Vladimirovich Belikov
- Date of birth: 1909
- Place of birth: Zuyevo, Russian Empire
- Date of death: 3 July 1987 (aged 77–78)
- Place of death: Volgograd, USSR
- Position: Defender

Senior career*
Years	Team	Apps	(Gls)
- Krasny Tekstilshchik
1932	Dynamo Saratov		
1932–1938	Dynamo Stalingrad		
1939–1946	Traktor Stalingrad	65	(0)
1947–195?	Dynamo Stalingrad		

Managerial career
- 1975: Rotor Volgograd (director)
- * Club domestic league appearances and goals

Konstantin Belikov (Russian: Константин Владимирович Беликов; 1909 – 3 July 1987) was a Soviet football defender and referee. Master of Sports of the USSR.

Belikov was born in Zuyevo. He started playing football in local team Krasny Tekstilshchik. In the early 1930s he served in the army, then moved to Stalingrad, where until 1938 played for the team Dynamo Stalingrad.

In 1939 he moved to the main team city – Traktor Stalingrad, which played in Soviet Top League. In the same year helped the team to take the highest place in the history of the team's performance in Soviet Top League – 4th place.

During the Great Patriotic War Konstantin Belikov went to the front, took part in the Battle of Stalingrad, and in May 1943, after the battle, was one of the participants of the famous match "On the ruins of Stalingrad".

3 February 1943 received the medal "For Battle Merit". Was also awarded the medal "For the Defence of Stalingrad".

After completing his playing career, worked football referee.

He died in 1987 in Volgograd.

== Sources ==
- Летопись областного футбола. Царицын. Сталинград. Волгоград. 1909-1962 [Chronicles of the regional football. Tsaritsyn. Stalingrad. Volgograd. 1909-1962] (in Russian). 2000. p. 238.
- Sklyarenko, Aleksandr (2000). "РОТОР" от сталинградского "Трактора" до наших дней. Футбольные хроники [Rotor from Traktor Stalingrad to this day. Football chronicles] (in Russian). Volgograd: Volgogradskaya pravda. p. 288. Archived from the original on 2014-02-21.
