= Renārs Kaupers =

Latvian pop singer and songwriter (born 1974)

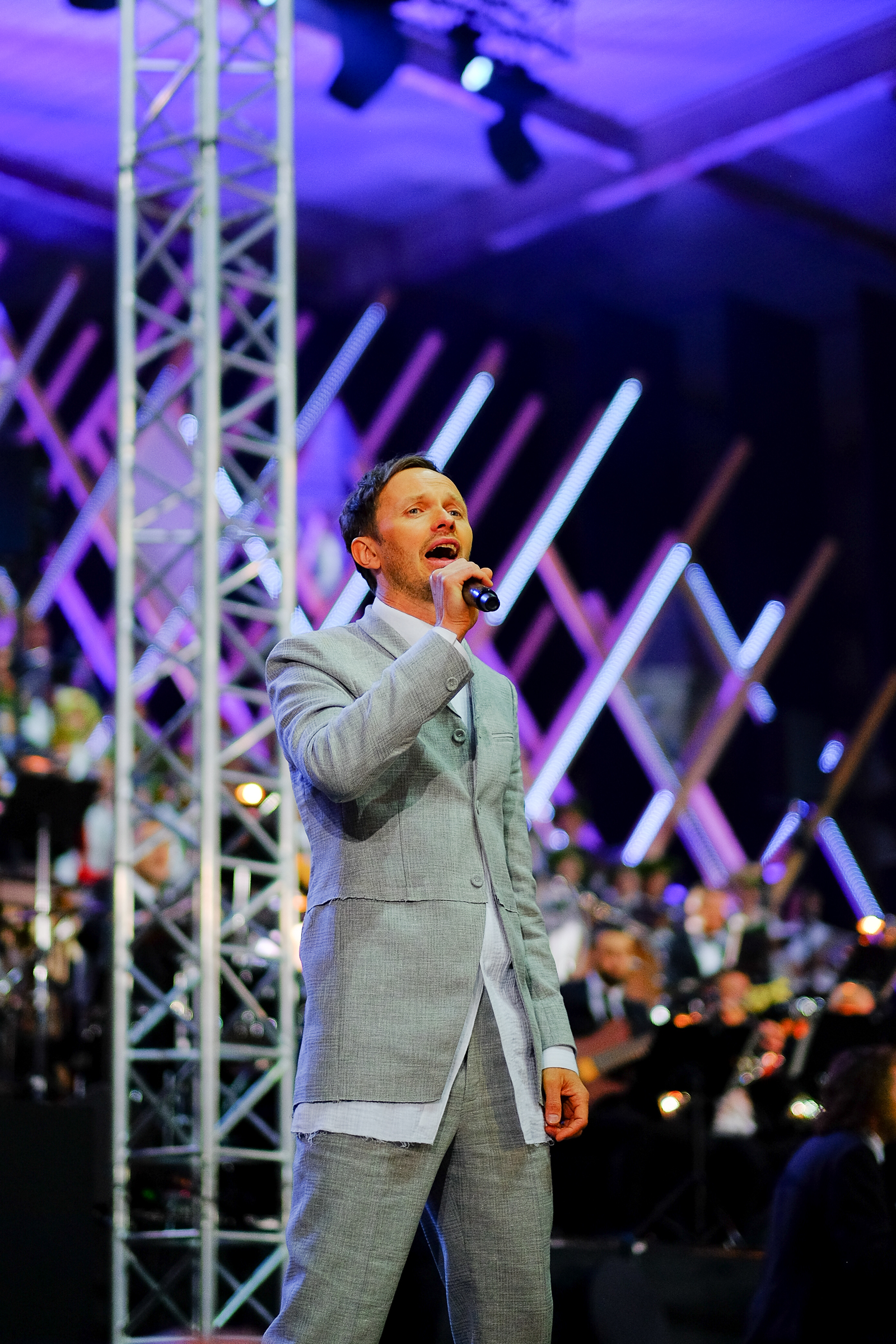
- Kaupers in 2018

Background information
- Born: Renārs Kaupers; 1 September 1974 (age 51)
- Origin: Jelgava, Latvian SSR
- Genres: Pop, pop-rock, rock
- Occupations: Singer, musician, songwriter, actor
- Years active: 1989–present
- Labels: MicRec, Brainstorm Records
- Website: www.brainstorm.lv

Renārs Kaupers (sometimes anglicised as Reynard Cowper; born 1 September 1974) is a Latvian pop/rock singer, instrumentalist, and songwriter who is the vocalist of the band Brainstorm.

== Biography ==
Kaupers graduated from University of Latvia in 1996 with a degree in journalism. He can speak at least three languages with fluency: English, Latvian, and Russian.

Kaupers' ancestors were probably Baron Friedrich von Stuart from Courland (1761–1842) and Immanuel Kant's niece Henrietta Kant.

He is the lead singer of the Latvian pop/rock band Brainstorm, which came third at the Eurovision Song Contest 2000 with their song "My Star". In 2001, Renārs received the Latvian Film Prize as the best actor for his role as Juziks in the film The Mystery of the Old Parish House.

He hosted the Eurovision Song Contest 2003 in Riga, Latvia, with co-host Marija Naumova, and also hosted Congratulations, the Eurovision 50th anniversary concert in Copenhagen, Denmark, with Katrina Leskanich.

Kaupers' sons Edgars and Emīls run the indie-pop group Carnival Youth.

== Decorations ==
- 2005 Fifth Class Order of the White Star of the Republic of Estonia.
- 2008 Fourth Class Order of the Three Stars of the Republic of Latvia.

== Filmography ==
=== Actor ===
1. Erik Stoneheart (2022) as Versac (Estonia)
2. Georg (2007) as Caesar (Estonia)
3. The Mystery of the Old Parish House (2000) as Juziks (Latvia)

=== Soundtrack ===
1. Premiya Muz-TV (2008) (TV) (music and lyrics: "Thunder Without Rain")

=== Self ===
1. Premiya Muz-TV (2008) (TV) (as Brainstorm) as himself
2. Congratulations: 50 Years of the Eurovision Song Contest (2005) (TV) as a host
3. Eirodziesma (2005) (TV) as a special guest
4. The Eurovision Song Contest (2003) (TV) as a host
5. Eurolaul (2003) (TV) as a member of the jury
6. The Eurovision Song Contest (2001) (TV) as the Latvian vote presenter
7. Eirodziesma (2000) (TV) as himself
8. The Eurovision Song Contest (2000) (TV) as a member of Brainstorm representing Latvia

== See also ==
- List of Eurovision Song Contest presenters

Achievements
Preceded by none	Latvia in the Eurovision Song Contest (as part of Brainstorm); 2000	Succeeded by Arnis Mednis with "Too Much"
Preceded by (Estonia) Annely Peebo and Marko Matvere	Eurovision Song Contest presenter (with Marie N); 2003	Succeeded by (Turkey) Korhan Abay and Meltem Cumbul
