= Johann Andreas Frerichs =

British businessman (1799–1866)

- Born: 1799
- Died: 1866 (aged 66–67)
- Occupation: Businessman

Johann Andreas Frerichs (1799–1866) was a German, who together with his brother Johann Heinrich Frerichs settled in the United Kingdom, where he founded the De Jersey & Co., a firm in the textile industry.

He moved to Cheltenham, firstly to a house in Landsdown Place, then he had Thirlestaine Hall built by the architects Rainger, Stride and Jones. He moved there after 1857.

His daughter, Lucy Sophia married Count Eric Stenbock, and Johann's grandson Eric Stenbock was born in Thirlestaine Hall.
