= James Charnock =

English mechanical engineer (1851–1899)

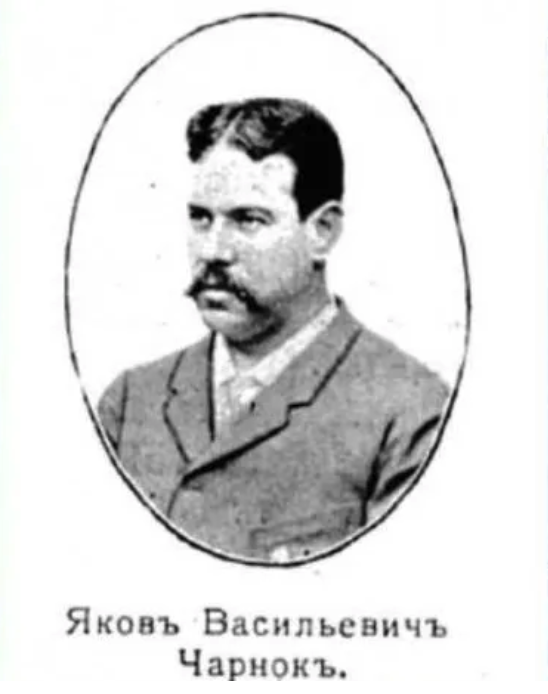
- Born: 18 March 1851; Dukinfield, England
- Died: 28 May 1899 (aged 48); Moscow, Russia
- Occupation(s): Mechanical engineer, entrepreneur
- Years active: 1872–1899

James Charnock (18 March 1851 – 28 May 1899) was an English mechanical engineer who spent much of his career in the Russian Empire. His nephew Clement Charnock and great-nephew Harry Charnock later joined him in the Russian Empire.

James studied at St Johns school, Dukinfield, and Stalybridge Mechanical Institute, whilst also working for Edward Sidebottom and Son company. Then at the age of 16 he was recommended by Platt Brothers to De Jersey & Co. to go and work as an engineer in Imperial Russia. He first worked for Ludwig Knoop at the Kreenholm Manufacturing Company, Narva, Estonia – which at the time was part of the Russian Empire.

In 1897, James was working for the Vikula Morozov Company at their factory in Nikolskoye when there was a strike by 8,000 spinners, mostly women. Charnock became involved in the negotiations, which was taken as a sign that management was reluctant to concede a reduction in the working day to levels enjoyed by workers at the neighbouring factory run by Savva Morozov. The crowd of strikers became very angry and moved onto Charnock's house. He was away at the factory, and his wife and children had fled. The police killed one worker and wounded two others, which further enraged the crowd who then invaded the Charnock residence, setting it alight.
