= FC Znamya Truda Orekhovo-Zuyevo =

Russian football club

FC Znamya Truda
- Full name: FC Znamya Truda Orekhovo-Zuevo
- Nicknames: Morozovtsy, Nuts
- Founded: 16 November 1909; 116 years ago
- Ground: Znamya Truda Stadium, Orekhovo-Zuevo
- Capacity: 2,410
- Owner: Orekhovo-Zuyevo
- Chairman: Aleksandr Kuznetsov
- Manager: Aleksandr Dantsev
- League: Russian Amateur Football League
- 2025: Russian Second League, Division B, Group 3, 5th
- Website: https://zt-oz.ru/
Home colours	Away colours

Znamya Truda is a Russian football club from Orekhovo-Zuevo, Moscow Oblast. The club is most noted because they are the oldest now-playing club in Russia, founded in 1909. The club's finest hour came in 1962 when they reached the final of the USSR Cup.

== History ==
The club was founded in the village of Orekhovo which was to join with Zuevo and Nikolskoye to form Orekhovo-Zuyevo in 1917.

In the 2017–18 season, Znamya Truda finished last in its group, losing 24 matches out of 26. It had to lose its professional status and be relegated to the Amateur Football League, however, the club avoided relegation since another club in the competition ceased to exist.

In January 2025, a separate Second League club FC Kompozit Pavlovsky Posad was merged into Znamya Truda.

In February 2026, it was announced that Znamya Truda will not play in the 2026 Russian Second League season.

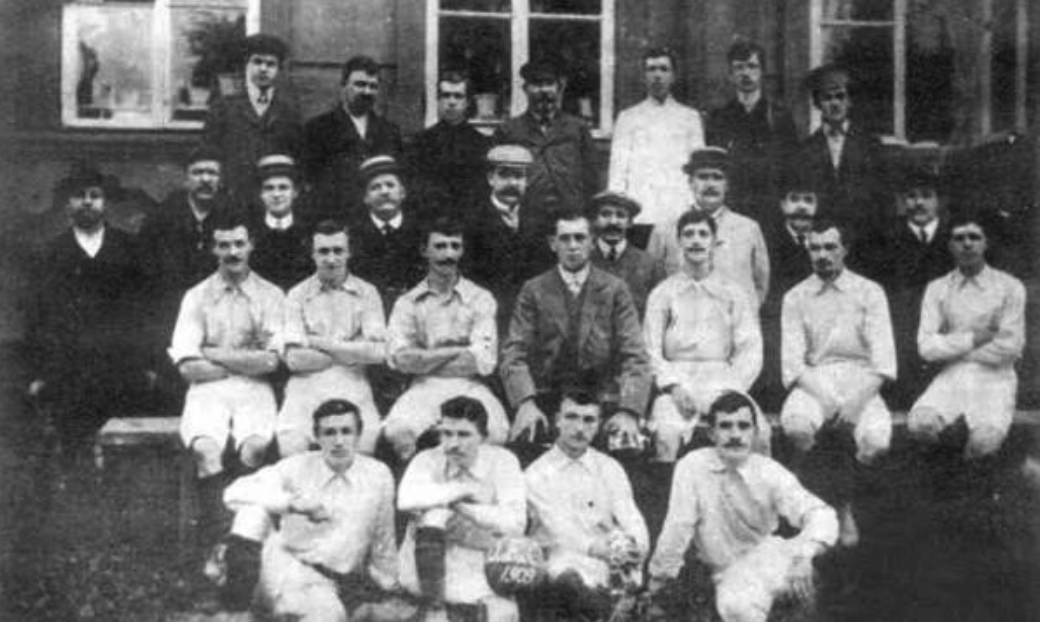
Morozovtsy Team, 1908

=== Naming History ===
- 1909–1935: Morozovtsy, KSO, TsPKFK, Orekhovo-Zuyevo, Krasnoye Orekhovo, Krasny Tekstilshchik
- 1935–1937: Krasnoye Znamya
- 1938–1945: Zvezda
- 1946–1957: Krasnoye Znamya
- 1958–1991: Znamya Truda
- 1992: Khitryye Lisy
- 1993–1994: FC Orekhovo
- 1995–1996: GFC Orekhovo
- 1997–2002: Spartak-Orekhovo
- 2003–present: Znamya Truda

== Notable players ==
Had international caps for their respective countries. Players whose name is listed in bold represented their countries while playing for Znamya Truda.

Russia/USSR

- (Soviet Union) Mikhail Biryukov
- (Russia) Vyacheslav Dayev
- (Russia) Sergei Ignashevich
- (Soviet Union) Viktor Papayev
- (Russia) Aleksandr Sheshukov

Former USSR countries

- (Tajikistan) Igor Vityutnev
- (Tajikistan) Akhmed Yengurazov
- (Turkmenistan) Andrei Martynov
