= KS Orekhovo =

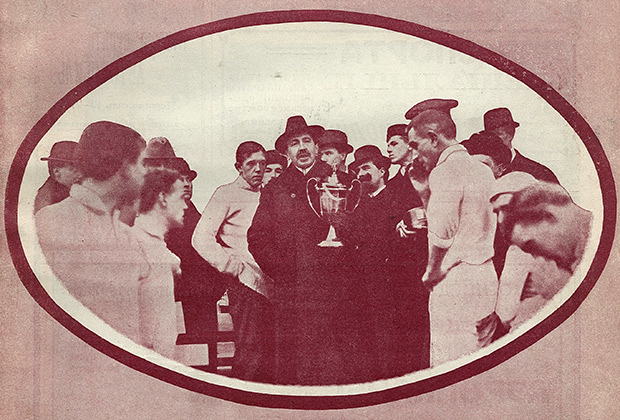
Robert Fulda presenting the Fulda Cup to KS Orekhovo, 22 October 1912

Kluba Sporta Orekhovo (Russian: Клуба спорта «Орехово»), generally abbreviated to KS Orekhovo or KSO was a Russian football team established in Orekhovo in 1909 by two brothers from England, Clement and Harry Charnock.

== See also ==
- FC Znamya Truda Orekhovo-Zuyevo
