= Football in Imperial Russia =

Association Football in Imperial Russia emerged in the late nineteenth century. Both Scottish and English immigrants are attributed as playing a significant role in the introduction of the sport into the lands of Imperial Russia.

British sailors played the first recorded game of football in Russian Empire in Odessa in the 1860s.

== Football teams founded in Imperial Russia ==
- KS Orekhovo, 1909
- Zamoskvoretsky Sports Club, 1910
