= Boris Levin-Kogan =

Soviet footballer

Personal information
- Full name: Boris Yakovlevich Levin-Kogan
- Date of birth: December 31, 1918
- Place of birth: Petrograd
- Date of death: May 10, 1998 (aged 79)
- Place of death: Saint Petersburg
- Height: 1.76 m (5 ft 9 1/2 in)
- Positions: Striker; midfielder

Senior career*
Years	Team	Apps	(Gls)
1937	Kirovskiy Zavod Leningrad	10	(1)
1938	Stalinets Leningrad	2	(1)
1939—1940	Avangard Leningrad	42	(12)
1941—1951	Zenit Leningrad	149	(13)
Total		203	(27)
- * Club domestic league appearances and goals

Boris Yakovlevich Levin-Kogan (Russian: Бори́с Я́ковлевич Ле́вин-Ко́ган) (December 31, 1918 – May 10, 1998) was a Soviet association football striker and later midfielder, who played predominantly for Zenit Leningrad. Levin-Kogan was born in Petrograd to a Jewish family.

After retiring, Levin-Kogan worked as a coach for youth teams.

Levin-Kogan died at the age of 79 and was buried in St. Petersburg's Smolensky Cemetery on Vasilievsky Island.
