= 1941 in Soviet football =

Football in the Soviet Union
- Season: 1941

Men's football
- Group A: Dinamo Moscow (leader)

The 1941 Soviet football championship was the 11th seasons of competitive football in the Soviet Union. Dinamo Moscow was a leader of the championship in Group A. The whole season in the Soviet Union was interrupted due to the Nazi Germany invasion of the Soviet Union and opening of the Eastern Front. All of the All-Union competitions were suspended, while some Republican level competitions continued in states that were away from open hostilities.

== Soviet Union football championship ==
=== Group A ===
Pos	Team	Pld	W	D	L	GF	GA	GR	Pts
1	Dynamo Moscow	10	6	3	1	28	12	2.333	15
2	Dynamo Leningrad	10	5	4	1	18	8	2.250	14
3	Dynamo Tbilisi	9	5	3	1	21	11	1.909	13
4	Stakhanovets Stalino	10	6	0	4	11	10	1.100	12
5	Traktor Stalingrad	11	3	6	2	13	13	1.000	12
6	CDKA Moscow	9	5	1	3	15	13	1.154	11
7	Spartak Moscow	9	4	2	3	17	12	1.417	10
8	Dynamo Kyiv	9	4	2	3	16	14	1.143	10
9	Profsoyuzy-2 Moscow	9	3	3	3	11	12	0.917	9
10	Spartak Odessa	8	2	3	3	12	14	0.857	7
11	Zenit Leningrad	10	3	1	6	15	22	0.682	7
12	Spartak Leningrad	9	1	4	4	8	16	0.500	6
13	Dynamo Minsk	10	3	0	7	10	21	0.476	6
14	Spartak Kharkiv	9	2	1	6	7	19	0.368	5
15	Profsoyuzy-1 Moscow	9	1	2	6	10	15	0.667	4

Source: rsssf.com
- CDKA were renamed to Red Army (now CSKA)
- Out of Moscovite Lokomotiv, Torpedo, Metallurg, and Krylya Sovetov were formed teams Profsoyuzy-1 and Profsoyuzy-2.
- Out of Leningradis Avangard, Zenit, and Krasnaya Zaria were formed teams Profsoyuz of Leningrad which was renamed again into Zenit.
- As the Group B liquidated for the 1941 season FC Dinamo Minsk, FC Spartak Odessa, and FC Spartak Kharkiv were promoted along with SC Spartak Leningrad. Presumably FC Spartak Kharkiv was also a merger of Dynamo, and Silmash forming the reformed united city team Spartak, but evidence of that is yet to be found.

=== Top goalscorers ===
Group A

- Viktor Matveyev (Traktor Stalingrad), Aleksey Sokolov (Spartak Moscow) – 8 goals

== Republican level ==
Football competitions of union republics

=== Football championships ===
- Azerbaijan SSR –
- Armenian SSR –
- Belarusian SSR – (see Football Championship of the Belarusian SSR)
- Estonian SSR – unfinished
- Georgian SSR –
- Kazakh SSR –
- Karelo-Finish SSR –
- Kirgiz SSR –
- Latvian SSR – unfinished
- Lithuanian SSR – unfinished
- Moldavian SSR –
- Russian SFSR – none
- Tajik SSR –
- Turkmen SSR –
- Uzbek SSR –
- Ukrainian SSR – unknown (see Football Championship of the Ukrainian SSR)

=== Football cups ===
- Azerbaijan SSR –
- Armenian SSR –
- Belarusian SSR –
- Estonian SSR –
- Georgian SSR –
- Kazakh SSR –
- Karelo-Finish SSR –
- Kirgiz SSR –
- Latvian SSR –
- Lithuanian SSR –
- Moldavian SSR –
- Russian SFSR –
- Tajik SSR –
- Turkmen SSR –
- Uzbek SSR –
- Ukrainian SSR –
