= Vasili Yermasov =

Soviet footballer and manager (1913–1990)

Personal information
- Full name: Vasili Vladimirovich Yermasov
- Date of birth: 9 January 1913
- Place of birth: Tsaritsyn, Russian Empire
- Date of death: 30 April 1990 (aged 77)
- Place of death: Volgograd, USSR
- Position: Goalkeeper

Senior career*
Years	Team	Apps	(Gls)
- Krasnaya Zvezda Stalingrad
- Dynamo Stalingrad
- Krasny Oktyabr Stalingrad
1937–1939	Metallurg Stalingrad		
1940–1947	Traktor Stalingrad	80	(–128)
1948–1949	Torpedo Stalingrad	11	(–13)
1950	Dynamo Stalingrad		

Managerial career
- 1952: Dynamo Stalingrad
- 1955–1956: Torpedo Stalingrad
- 1959: Metallurg Stalingrad
- * Club domestic league appearances and goals

Vasili Yermasov (Russian: Василий Владимирович Ермасов; 9 January 1913 – 30 April 1990) was a Soviet football goalkeeper and manager.

Yermasov was born in Tsaritsyn. He started playing football in 1932, in team sports club Krasnaya Zvezda Stalingrad. Later played for Dynamo Stalingrad and Metallurg Stalingrad.

Summit debuted at age 24, and on his first match came as a team captain. In the match of the 1937 Soviet Cup club Metallurg Stalingrad on his field had stubborn resistance of the team from second division Torpedo Moscow, losing only in overtime. Four teammates next season played for team from top division Traktor Stalingrad. Yermasov transferred to the major team of the city before the season 1940.

During the Great Patriotic War Vasili Yermasov went to the front, took part in the Battle of Stalingrad, and in May 1943, after the battle, was one of the organizers and participants of the famous match "On the ruins of Stalingrad".

3 February 1943 received the medal "For Courage", which was awarded 2 May 1943 before the match "On the ruins of Stalingrad", together with the medal "For the Defence of Stalingrad".

After completing his playing career, worked as manager of Stalingrad's football teams. In 1955–1956 he was the manager of the team Torpedo Stalingrad.

He died, aged 77, in Volgograd.

== Sources ==
- Летопись областного футбола. Царицын. Сталинград. Волгоград. 1909-1962 [Chronicles of the regional football. Tsaritsyn. Stalingrad. Volgograd. 1909-1962] (in Russian). 2000. p. 238.
- Sklyarenko, Aleksandr (2000). "РОТОР" от сталинградского "Трактора" до наших дней. Футбольные хроники [Rotor from Traktor Stalingrad to this day. Football chronicles] (in Russian). Volgograd: Volgogradskaya pravda. p. 288.
