= De Jersey & Co. =

19th-20th–century British cotton company

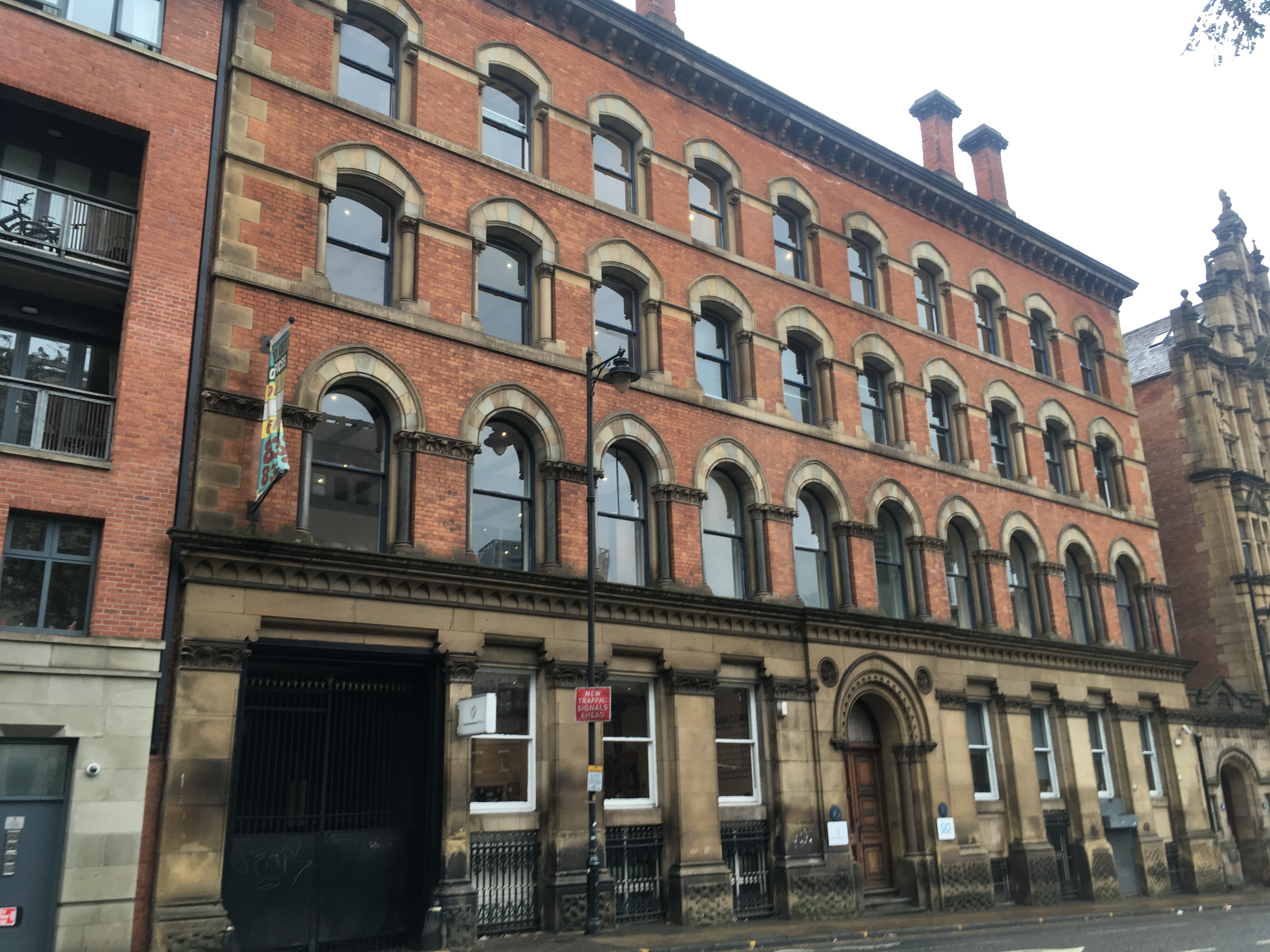
14 and 16 Blackfriars Street

De Jersey & Co. was a company founded by the brothers Johann Andreas Frerichs and Johann Heinrich Frerichs, two merchants from Bremen who settled in England, where they became involved in the cotton industry. They were attracted to Manchester, which had acquired the nickname Cottonopolis by the mid nineteenth century.

De Jersey & Co. appointed Franz Holzhauer as their agent in Moscow and around 1840 the Frerichs brothers appointed their nephew Ludwig Knoop as his assistant. The company supported Knoop when he established his own company, L. Knoop & Co., Moscow and St Petersburg in 1852, also in conjunction with Platt Brothers, an Oldham-based company that produced cotton-spinning machinery. Together they played a major role in the expansion cotton textile production in the Russian Empire.

In 1914 they had officers at 14, Blackfriars Street, Manchester and 81, 82, 84 and 85, Cotton Exchange Buildings, Bixteth Street, Liverpool.
