= Textile industry in the Russian Empire =

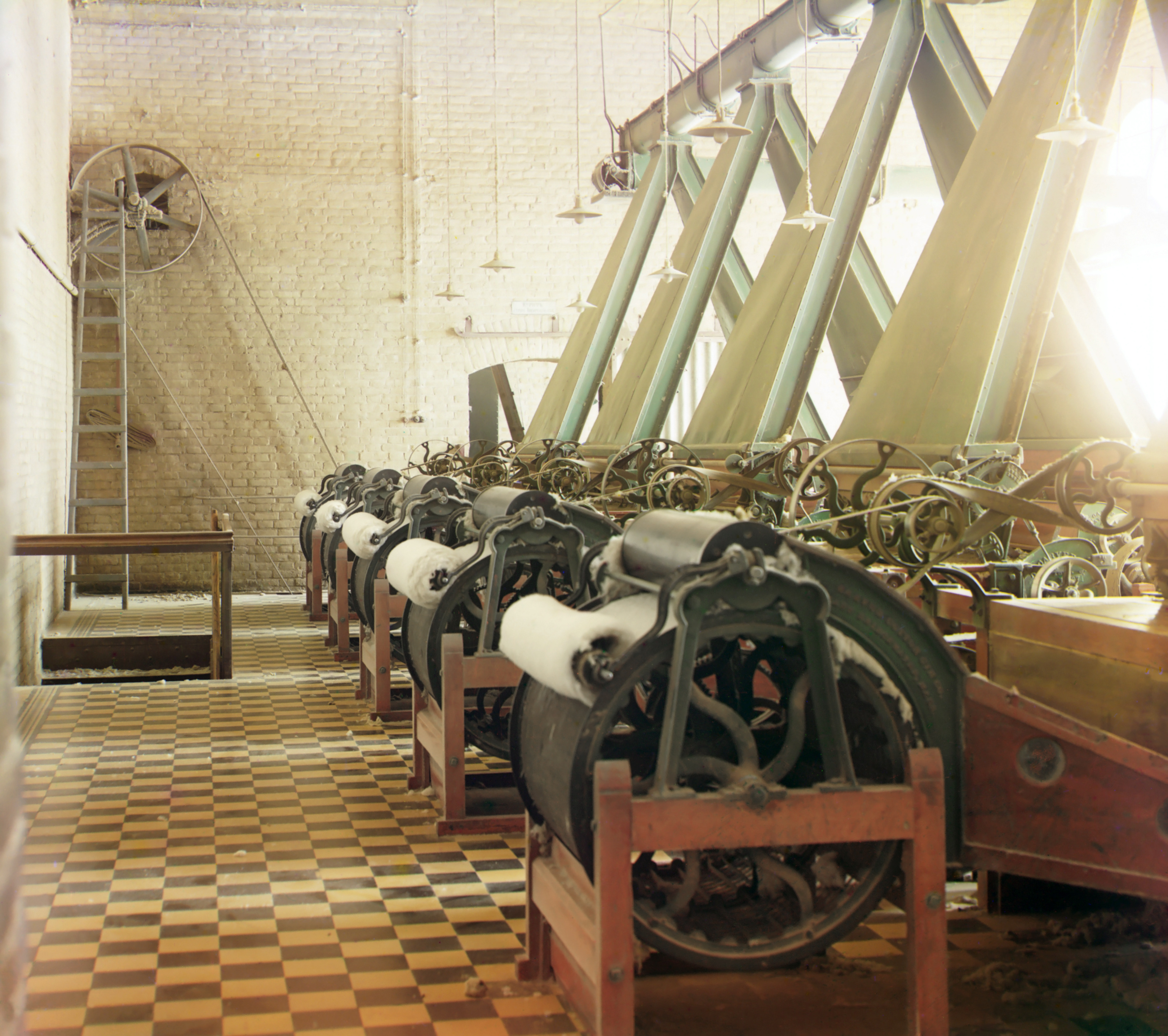
A Russian cotton textile mill's interior, 1911

The textile industry in the Russian Empire developed significantly in the nineteenth century. It played a significant role in the Industrialization in the Russian Empire.

In 1840, the Manchester-based company De Jersey & Co. appointed Franz Holzhauer as their agent in Moscow with Ludwig Knoop as his assistant. At the time, Manchester was known as Cottonopolis and De Jersey and Co. played a major role in developing the cotton industry in the Russian Empire.

The first large-scale cotton printing and dye works was established in 1753 by two English businessmen, William Chamberlain and Richard Cozzens, with the aid of state subsidies.

In 1895, the Russian Technical Society criticized Knoop for holding back the Russian textile industry by exclusively importing English textile machinery.
