= Nikolskoye, Pokrovsky Uyezd, Vladimir Governorate =

Historic town in Imperial Russia

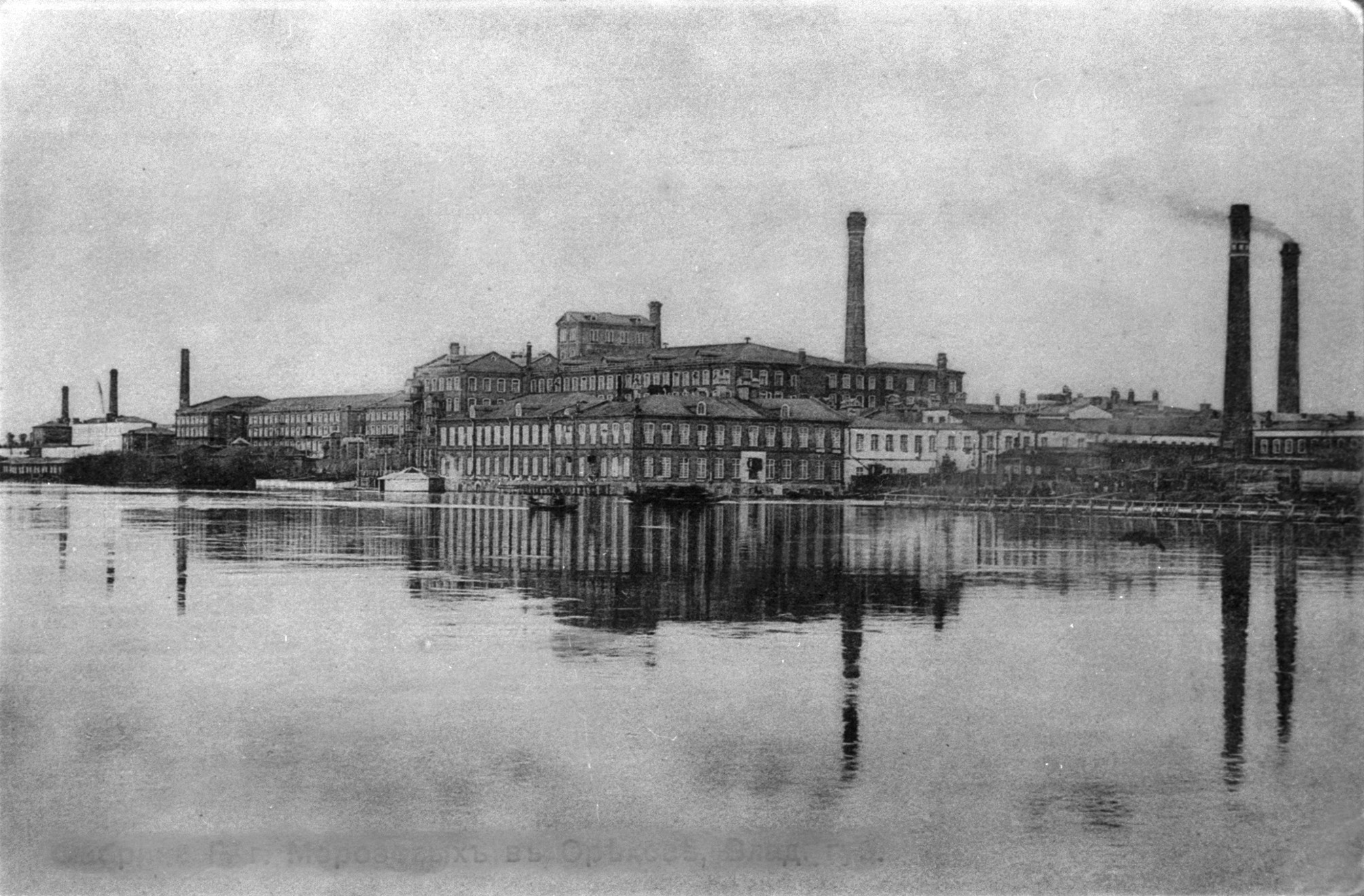
Morozov factory, Nikolskoye

Nikolskoye was a historic town in Pokrovsky Uyezd, Vladimir Governorate, Imperial Russia. Since 1917, it has been part of the city of Orekhovo-Zuyevo. The town played a significant part in the development of the textile sector in Imperial Russia.

== Early development ==
The settlement grew up in the seventeenth and eighteenth century around the church of St Nicholas. The location was transformed when Savva Vasilyevich Morozov bought land here in 1797. After he had bought his freedom in 1820, he moved his business from his nearby native village of Zuevo. In the period 1837-1838 he established a new factory on wasteland. By 1859 it had a registered population of 2,489 people. This rose to 25,203 in 1897. The Morozov property in Nikolskoye was split between Vikul Eliseevich Morozov and his uncle Timofei Savvich Morozov which sat side by side each other on the banks of the Klyazma River.

== Morozov strike 1885 ==
In January 1885, the Morozovs' Nikolskoye factory took part in a strike wave which spread across the textile sector of Imperial Russia. Over 8,000 workers took part but it was crushed by troops of the Imperial Russian Army with over 600 arrests.
