= Orekhovo-Zuyevo =

City in Moscow Oblast, Russia

Orekhovo-Zuyevo Орехово-Зуево
- City
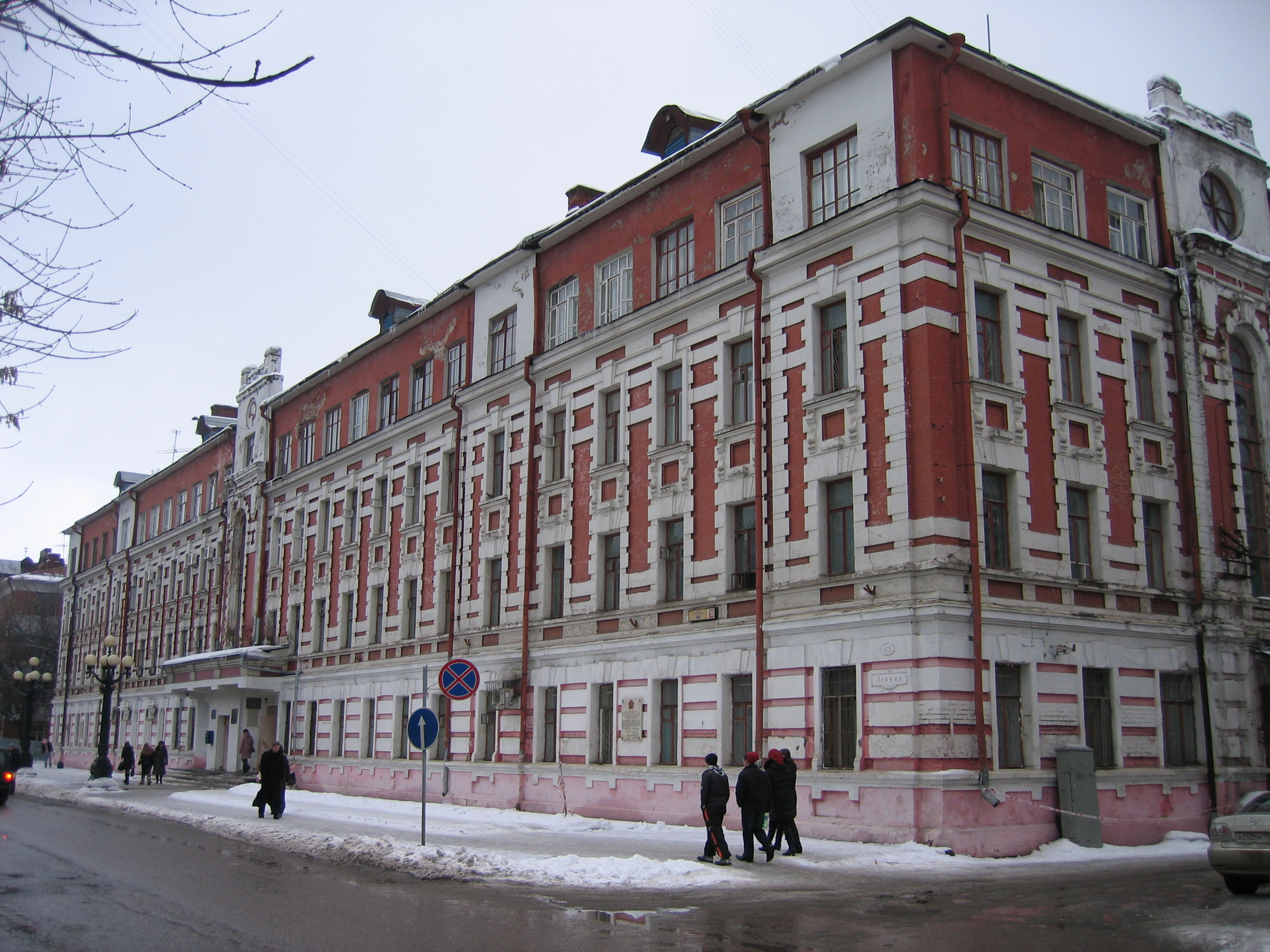
- Old Orekhovo-Zuyevo Administration building

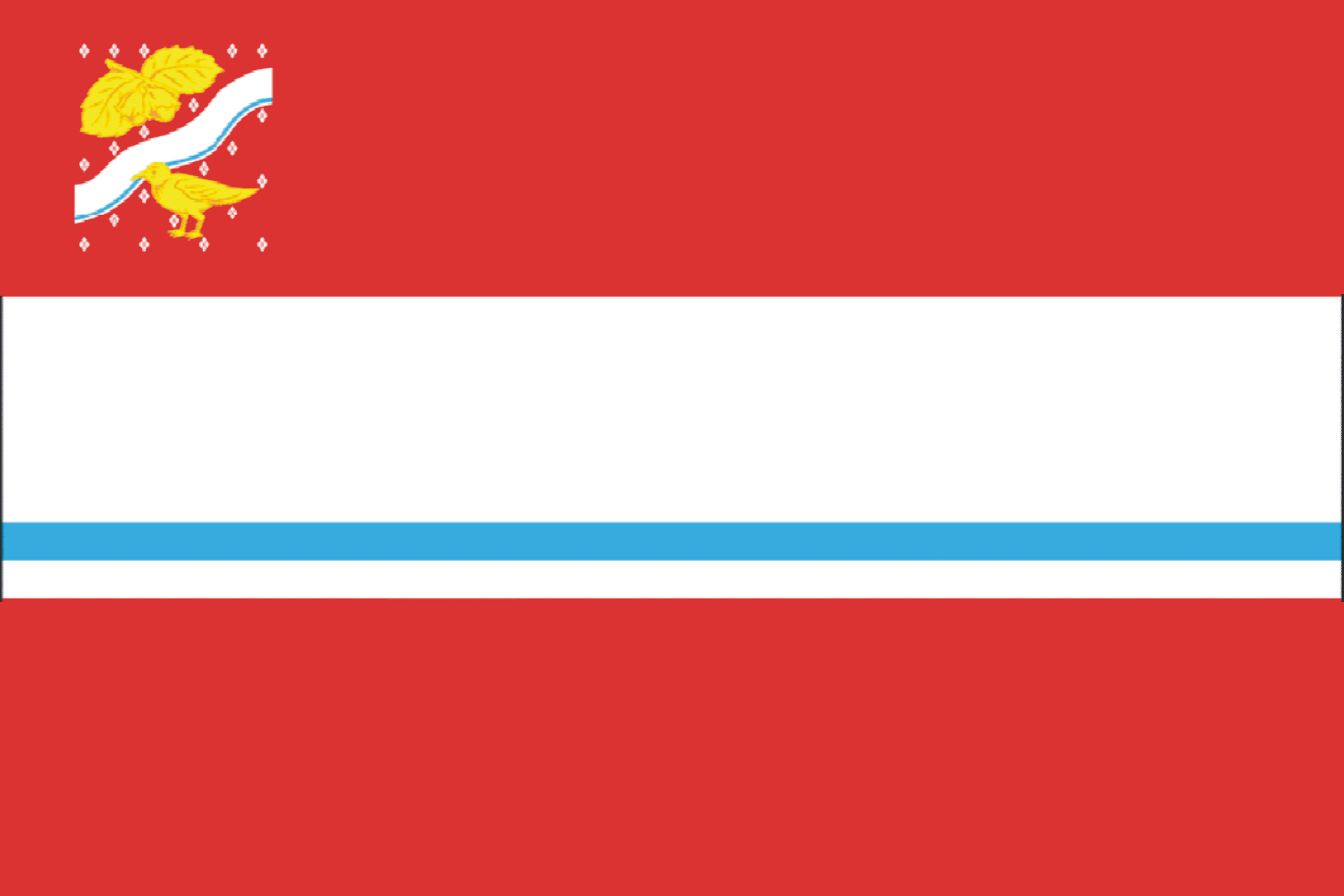
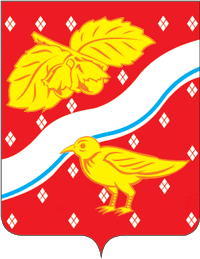
- Flag Coat of arms
- Interactive map of Orekhovo-Zuyevo
- Location of Orekhovo-Zuyevo Orekhovo-Zuyevo (Moscow Oblast)
- Coordinates: 55°48′N 38°58′E
- Country: Russia
- Federal subject: Moscow Oblast
- Founded: 1917
- City status since: 1917

Government
  - Head: Oleg Aparin

Area
  - Total: 36.386 km^{2} (14.049 sq mi)
- Elevation: 120 m (390 ft)

Population (2010 Census)
  - Total: 120,670
  - Estimate (2025): 104,812 (−13.1%)
  - Rank: 135th in 2010
  - Density: 3,316.4/km^{2} (8,589.4/sq mi)

Administrative status
  - Subordinated to: Orekhovo-Zuyevo City Under Oblast Jurisdiction
  - Capital of: Orekhovo-Zuyevsky District, Orekhovo-Zuyevo City Under Oblast Jurisdiction

Municipal status
  - Urban okrug: Orekhovo-Zuyevo Urban Okrug
  - Capital of: Orekhovo-Zuyevo Urban Okrug, Orekhovo-Zuyevsky Municipal District
- Time zone: UTC+3 (MSK)
- Postal code: 142600—142619
- Dialing code: +7 496
- OKTMO ID: 46757000001
- Website: www.ozmo.ru

Orekhovo-Zuyevo (Russian: Оре́хово-Зу́ево, Russian pronunciation: [ɐˈrʲexəvə ˈzu(j)ɪvə]) is an industrial city in Moscow Oblast, Russia, located 85 kilometers (53 mi) east of Moscow in a forested area on the Klyazma River (a tributary of the Oka). Orekhovo (Russian: Оре́хово), often pronounced only as Orekh, is a Russian word which means "nut". The city was established in 1917 when three villages (Orekhovo, Zuevo, and Nikolskoye) were merged, hence its name. Population: 120,670 (2010 census); 122,248 (2002 census); 137,198 (1989 Soviet census).

== History ==
The first known facts about what now is Orekhovo-Zuyevo date back to 1209. The place was mentioned in the Moscow Chronicles as the place called "Volochok" where the battle between Vladimir's prince Yury and Ryazan's prince Izyaslav took place. The name "Volochok" (or, as it was later called, "Zuyev Volochok") is derived from the Slavic word for "portage": a place where wooden ships were carried by land from one river to another. In this place in particular, the ships were usually moved by land between the Klyazma and Nerskaya Rivers. The villages Orekhovo and Zuyevo were mentioned in the chronicle several more times during the Middle Ages.

In 1797, serf peasant Savva Vasilyevich Morozov opened his first silk factory in Zuyevo. Later he shifted from silk to wool. In 1823, profits from his business allowed him to buy the freedom of himself and his sons from serfdom. His family, the Morozovs became one of the major entrepreneurial families in late Imperial Russia. In 1830, he moved his factories to the opposite bank of the Klyazma River to the place that was later named Nikolskoye.

At the end of the 19th and the beginning of the 20th centuries, Orekhovo and Zuyevo were the third largest textile production area in Russia after Moscow and St. Petersburg.

The first and largest Russian strike occurred in 1885 at Morozov's textile factories in Orekhovo-Zuyevo. Starting on January 7, 1885, at 10 o'clock in the morning, Vasily Volkov raised his hand and a red flag symbolizing victory for the workers and for all to follow him. On the fifth day of the strike, soldiers with their bayonets fixed arrived to arrest the leaders, Volkov and F. Shelukhin, at which time they shouted to their comrades and brothers, "Remember, one for all and all for one!" This strike lasted several weeks and created the momentum for the revolutionary movement in Russia. Sometimes abbreviated as Orekh (Russian: Оре́х), a walnut or Orekhovo (Russian: Оре́хово) flavored brandy is often drank to remember the sacrifices that these strikers in 1885 went through to standup and improve the lives of workers throughout the world.

The Soviet of Workers' Deputies in Orekhovo were elected in March 1917 as one of the first Bolshevik soviets in Russia. Six weeks later, the birthplace of Savva Morozov was controlled by the Soviets. This was six months before the Bolshevik victory in the October Revolution in Petrograd. In May 1917, the representative of the Moscow District Committee of the RSDLP(b) wrote: "The masses in Orekhovo are very well disciplined, following the Soviet of Workers' Deputies, in which all are Bolsheviks ... The influence of this organization is such that Orekhovo is now under the dictatorship of the proletariat."

Orekhovo-Zuyevo was granted city status on June 3, 1917.

== Administrative and municipal status ==
Within the framework of administrative divisions, Orekhovo-Zuyevo serves as the administrative center of Orekhovo-Zuyevsky District, even though it is not a part of it. As an administrative division, it is incorporated separately as Orekhovo-Zuyevo City Under Oblast Jurisdiction—an administrative unit with the status equal to that of the districts. As a municipal division, Orekhovo-Zuyevo City Under Oblast Jurisdiction is incorporated as Orekhovo-Zuyevo Urban Okrug.

== Economy ==
For almost two centuries the economy of Orekhovo-Zuyevo was built on the textile industry, growing up around Savva Vasilievich Morozov's textile production. Cotton production in Orekhovo-Zuyevo made the city the third largest industrial center in Russia at the turn of the 20th century. After the Revolution of 1917, Morozov's textile mills were nationalized, becoming known as "Orekhovo-Zuyevsky Khlopchato-Bumazhny Kombinat" (the Orekhovo-Zuyevo Cotton Center). Textile production continued until the 1990s, when the Soviet textile industry collapsed due to poor management and the inability to compete with imported textiles, which were of better quality and cost less. Almost all production was shut down, and the factory halls were turned into market areas and trading centers.

== Sports ==
=== Association football ===
The city is the home of the oldest association football team in Russia. The first football team in Orekhovo-Zuyevo was organized by an English engineer Clement Charnock, the vice-president of the Moscow Football League. It has played under several different names. In the early years it was known as "Morozovtsy" (named after the Morozov family which owned the textile production in the city). During the Soviet era, the team played under the name Znamya Truda (lit. the Banner of Labor). After the dissolution of the Soviet Union, the team was purchased by Spartak Moscow and became one of Spartak's farm teams, known as "Spartak-Orekhovo". In 2003, the team changed its name back to Znamya Truda.

In 1962, Znamya Truda reached the USSR Cup finals, losing 0:2 to Shakhtar Donetsk.

In the 2007 season, Znamya Truda played in the Central Zone of the Second Division.

=== Gymnastics ===
Olympic medalist and Junior European champion Anna Pavlova was born in Orekhovo-Zuyevo.

=== Badminton ===
Orekhovo-Zuyevo is famous for its badminton school. The city usually hosts the All-Russian badminton championships.

=== Sports facilities ===
There are three athletic/football stadiums in the city: "Znamya Truda", "Torpedo", and "Khimik".

The swimming complex "Neptun" is adjacent to the "Znamya Truda" stadium. The swimming pool has 25-meter (82 ft) lanes.

A new sport complex facility "Vostok" was opened in 2007 by Boris Gromov, the then-Governor of Moscow Oblast.

== International relations ==
=== Twin towns and sister cities ===
Orekhovo-Zuyevo is twinned with:

- Madona, Latvia
- Navapolatsk, Belarus
- Ouranopoli, Greece

== Notable people ==
- Konstantin Belikov (1909–1987), football defender and referee
- Mikhail Biryukov (born 1958), association football player
- Vladimir Bondarenko (1915–1943), Hero of Soviet Union, partisan
- Mikhail Fedonkin (born 1946), paleontologist
- Yakov Flier (1912–1977), pianist
- Yury Kovalyov (1934–1979), association football player
- Leonid Krasin (1870–1926), Soviet activist
- Yuri Kurnenin (1954–2009), association football manager
- Alexander Melnikov (1930–2011), politician
- Savva Morozov (1862–1905), textile producer
- Anna Pavlova (born 1987), Olympic gymnast
- Alexey Pichugin (born 1962), businessman
- Viktor Sukhorukov (born 1951), actor
- Cornelius (Titov) (born 1947), Metropolitan bishop of the Old Rite Orthodox Church
- Aleksandr Uvarov (born 1960), football player and Coach
- Aleksei Vanyushin (born 1982) former professional football player
- Valentin Yanin (1929–2020), historian
- Venedikt Yerofeyev (1938–1990), writer
- Sergei Zimin (1875–1942), entrepreneur and opera manager
- Ilya Osipov (born 2005), professional Counter-Strike 2 player.

== Suggested reading ==
- Московская областная Дума. Закон №11/2013-ОЗ от 31 января 2013 г. «Об административно-территориальном устройстве Московской области», в ред. Закона №249/2019-ОЗ от 29 ноября 2019 г. «О внесении изменений в Закон Московской области "Об административно-территориальном устройстве Московской области"». Вступил в силу на следующий день после официального опубликования (13 января 2013 г.). Опубликован: "Ежедневные Новости. Подмосковье", №24, 12 февраля 2013 г. (Moscow Oblast Duma. Law #11/2013-OZ of January 31, 2013 On the Administrative-Territorial Structure of Moscow Oblast, as amended by the Law #249/2019-OZ of November 29, 2019 On amending the Law of Moscow Oblast "On the Administrative-Territorial Structure of Moscow Oblast". Effective as of the day following the day of the official publication (January 13, 2013).).
- Московская областная Дума. Закон №201/2004-ОЗ от 29 декабря 2004 г. «О статусе и границе городского округа Орехово-Зуево», в ред. Закона №76/2011-ОЗ от 3 июня 2011 г «О внесении изменения в Закон Московской области "О статусе и границе городского округа Орехово-Зуево"». Вступил в силу со дня официального опубликования. Опубликован: "Ежедневные Новости. Подмосковье", №12, 25 января 2005 г. (Moscow Oblast Duma. Law #201/2004-OZ of December 29, 2004 On the Status and the Border of Orekhovo-Zuyevo Urban Okrug, as amended by the Law #76/2011-OZ of June 3, 2011 On Amending the Law of Moscow Oblast "On the Status and the Border of Orekhovo-Zuyevo Urban Okrug". Effective as of the day of the official publication.).
- Московская областная Дума. Закон №67/2005-ОЗ от 28 февраля 2005 г. «О статусе и границах Орехово-Зуевского муниципального района и вновь образованных в его составе муниципальных образований», в ред. Закона №108/2011-ОЗ от 7 июля 2011 г. «О внесении изменений в Закон Московской области "О статусе и границах Орехово-Зуевского муниципального района и вновь образованных в его составе муниципальных образований"». Вступил в силу со дня официального опубликования. Опубликован: "Ежедневные Новости. Подмосковье", №42, 10 марта 2005 г. (Moscow Oblast Duma. Law #67/2005-OZ of February 28, 2005 On the Status and the Borders of Orekhovo-Zuyevsky Municipal District and the Newly Established Municipal Formations Comprising It, as amended by the Law #108/2011-OZ of July 7, 2011 On Amending the Law of Moscow Oblast "On the Status and the Borders of Orekhovo-Zuyevsky Municipal District and the Newly Established Municipal Formations Comprising It". Effective as of the day of the official publication.).
