= Clement Charnock =

English mechanical engineer (1865–1950)

Clement Joseph Charnock (1865, Chorley – 17 April 1950) was an English mechanical engineer who spent much of his career in Imperial Russia and is credited with being a pioneer of football in Russia. He followed his uncle, James Charnock, who had left for Russia in 1868, when Clement was only three. Another brother, Harry Charnock, also joined them in Russia.

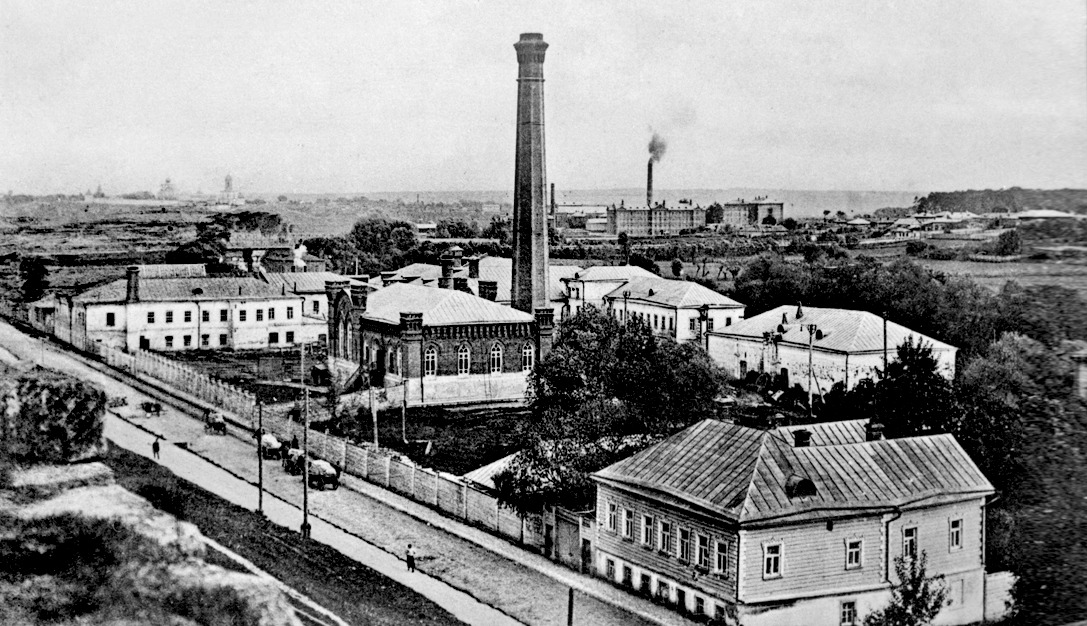
Factory belonging to the Konshin Brothers in Serpukhov where Charnock worked 1907-1910.

Charnock started his career with Platt Brothers, a company in Oldham, Lancashire, that produced textile machinery. Here he completed a five-year apprenticeship in 1887. Then he took up the post of Assistant Manager with Morozov and Sons at their factory in Orekhovo-Zuyevo, 85 km east of Moscow. In 1891, he became chief director for the Gorbunov Brothers. After remaining in post for sixteen years, in 1907 he took up a similar position with the Konshin Brothers. In 1910, he established his own business manufacturing paper tubes in a factory in Moscow. In 1916, he returned to England where he became involved with Cook & Co. a long-established company in Manchester that produced textile machinery.

== Pioneer of Russian football ==
Charnock was a Blackburn Rovers fan before he left for Russia. Soon after his arrival, he responded to concerns about alcoholism amongst the workforce by introducing them to football. At the time, rugby football had already been banned in 1886, as it was considered too violent by the authorities.
