= Alexey =

Russian masculine given name

- Gender: Male
- Language: Russian

Origin
- Origin: Greek
- Meaning: Defender

Other names
- Variant forms: Alexei, Aleksei, Aleksey
- Related names: Alexios, Alexius, Alexis

Alexey (Russian: Алексей, romanized: Aleksey [ɐlʲɪkˈsʲej]) is a Russian male given name derived from the Greek Aléxios (Αλέξιος), meaning "Defender", and thus of the same origin as the Latin Alexius.

Similar Ukrainian and Belarusian names are romanized as Oleksii (Олексій) and Aliaksiej (Аляксей), respectively. Other Slavic variants include the Polish Aleksy and the Czech and Slovak Alexej. The Finnish variant is Aleksi.

The Russian Orthodox Church uses the ecclesiastical form, Alexiy or Aleksiy (Алексий; pre-1918: Алексій), for its Saints and hierarchs (most notably, this is the form used for Patriarchs Alexius I and Alexius II). The name became fairly popular in Russia after the baptism of Michael of Russia's son, Alexis of Russia.

The common hypocoristic (diminutive) is Alyosha (Алёша) or simply Lyosha (Лёша). These may be further transformed into Alyoshka, Alyoshenka, Lyoshka, Lyoha, Lyoshenka (Алёшка, Алёшенька, Лёшка, Лёха, Лёшенька, respectively), sometimes rendered as Alesha or Aleshenka in English. The form Alyosha may be used as a full first name in Bulgaria (Альоша) and Armenia.

In theory, Alexia is the female form. It is, however, almost non-existent in Russian-speaking countries, where names such as Alexandra or Olesya are more commonly used.

The corresponding patronymics are Alexeyevich (male) and Alexeyevna (female).

The following surnames derive from Alexey and its various forms:

- Alexeyev/Alekseyev
- Alexeyevsky
- Alyoshin
- Alyokhin (Alekhine, Alekhin)
- Lyoshin
- Alexeytsev/Alekseytsev/Alekseitsev
- Alexeychuk/Alekseychuk/Alekseichuk
- Alexeychik/Alekseychik/Alekseichik
- Alexeyuk/Alekseyuk
- Alexeyenko/Alekseyenko/Alekseenko
- Alexeychenko/Alekseychenko/Alekseichenko
- Alexievich

People with the given name include:

== Royalty and historical figures ==
- Alexis of Russia (1629–1676), Tsar of Russia from 1645 to 1676
- Alexei Petrovich, Tsarevich of Russia (1690–1718), son of Peter I the Great
- Grand Duke Alexei Alexandrovich of Russia (1850–1908), son of Tsar Alexander II
- Grand Duke Alexei Mikhailovich of Russia (1875–1895), grandson of Tsar Nicholas I
- Alexei Nikolaevich, Tsarevich of Russia (1904–1918), son of Nicholas II, the last Tsesarevich
- Prince Alexey Lvov (1580s–1653/1654), Russian boyar and diplomat
- Alexei Razumovsky (1709–1771), Cossack count and lover of Empress Elizabeth
- Alexei Tammet-Romanov (died 1977), Estonian royal pretender
- Aleksey Okhotnikov (1780–1807), Lover of Empress Elizabeth

== Television and film ==
- Aleksei Balabanov (1959–2013), Russian filmmaker
- Alexey Barabash (born 1977), Russian actor
- Aleksey Bardukov (born 1984), Russian actor
- Aleksey Batalov (1927–2017), Soviet and Russian actor
- Alexey Borzunov (1943–2013) Soviet Russian actor
- Aleksey Buldakov (1951–2019), Russian actor
- Aleksey Chadov (born 1981), Russian actor
- Alexey Chupov (born 1973), Russian film director
- Alexey Eybozhenko (1934–1980), Soviet actor
- Aleksey Fedorchenko (born 1966), Russian film director
- Aleksei Fomkin (1969–1996), Soviet actor
- Alexei Fridman, full name of Lex Fridman (born 1983), American podcast host
- Alexey Gavrilov (born 1983), Russian actor
- Alexey Gerasimov (animator), creator of Skibidi Toilet
- Aleksei Alekseivich German (born 1976), Russian film director
- Alexey Gribov (born 1977), Soviet actor
- Aleksei Guskov (born 1958), Russian producer
- Aleksei Kapler (1903–1979), Soviet filmmaker
- Aleksey Konsovsky (1912–1991), Soviet actor
- Aleksei Kravchenko (actor) (born 1969), Russian actor
- Aleksei Loktev (1939–2006), Soviet actor
- Alexey Lushnikov (born 1966), Russian talk show host
- Alexey Lyaporov (born 1979), Russian television comedy producer
- Alexey Lysenkov (born 1965), Russian television presenter
- Alexei Makarov (born 1972), Russian actor
- Aleksei Maklakov (born 1961), Russian actor
- Aleksey Mikhalyov (translator) (1944–1994), Russian television dubber
- Aleksey Morozov (actor) (born 1979), Russian actor and director
- Alexey Neymyshev (born 1982), Russian actor
- Alexey Nilov (born 1964), Russian actor
- Aleksey Nuzhnyy (born 1984), Russian filmmaker
- Aleksei Panin (born 1977), Russian actor
- Aleksei Petrenko (1938–2017), Soviet actor
- Aleksey Pimanov (1962–2026), Russian television presenter and director
- Alexey Pokrovsky (1924–2009), Soviet actor
- Aleksei Poluyan (1965–2010), Russian actor
- Alexei Popogrebski (born 1972), Russian director
- Aleksey Popov (director) (1892–1961), Russian film director
- Alexey Popov (journalist) (born 1974), Russian television commentator
- Aleksei Rodionov (cinematographer) (born 1947), Russian cinematographer
- Aleksey Rozin (born 1978), Russian actor
- Alexey Saltykov (director) (1934–1993), Soviet director
- Aleksey Shevchenkov (born 1974), Russian actor
- Aleksei Shvachko (1901–1988), Ukrainian film-director
- Aleksey Sidorov (born 1968), Russian director
- Aleksei Smirnov (actor) (1920–1979), Soviet actor
- Alexei Uchitel (born 1951), Russian film director
- Alexei Venediktov (born 1955), Russian radio presenter
- Aleksei Veselkin (1961–2025), Russian actor and television personality
- Alexey Yaroshevsky (born 1984), Russian television reporter
- Aleksei Yuryevich German, (1938–2013) Russian filmmaker
- Aleksei Zharkov (1948–2016), Soviet actor

== Chess ==
- Alexei Alekhine (1888–1939), Russian chess player
- Alexei Barsov (born 1966), Uzbek chess grandmaster
- Alexei Bezgodov (born 1969), Russian chess grandmaster
- Alexei Chizhov (born 1964), Russian draughts grandmaster
- Alexey Dreev (born 1969), Russian chess grandmaster
- Alexei Fedorov (born 1972), Belarusian chess grandmaster
- Aleksey Goganov (born 1991), Russian chess grandmaster
- Aleksei Goncharov (chess player) (1879–1913), Russian chess master
- Aleksey Grebnev (born 2006), Russian chess grandmaster
- Alexey Kim (born 1986), Soviet-born South Korean chess grandmaster
- Alexei Kornev (born 1976), Russian chess grandmaster
- Alexey Korotylev (born 1977), Russian chess grandmaster
- Aleksei Kulashko (born 1972), New Zealand chess player
- Aleksei Pridorozhni (born 1981), Russian chess grandmaster
- Alexey Root (born 1965), American chess player
- Alexey Sarana (born 2000), Russo-Serbian chess grandmaster
- Alexey Selezniev (1888–1967), Russian chess player
- Alexei Shirov (born 1972), Latvian-Spanish chess Grandmaster
- Alexey Sokolsky (1908–1969), Soviet chess player
- Alexey Suetin (1926–2001), Russian chess grandmaster
- Alexey Vyzmanavin (1960–2000), Russian chess grandmaster

== Performing arts ==
- Aleksei Arbuzov (1908–1986), Soviet playwright
- Aleksey Burago, Russian-American theater director
- Aleksei Dikiy (1889–1955), Soviet theater director
- Alexey Goloborodko (born 1994), Russian dancing contortionist
- Aleksey Granovsky (1890–1937), Russian theatre director
- Alexei Potekhin (1829–1908), Russian dramatist
- Alexei Ratmansky (born 1968), Russian ballet dancer and choreographer
- Aleksei Serebryakov (actor) (born 1964), Russian stage performer
- Alexey Sheynin (born 1947), Russian theatrical actor
- Aleksey Yermolayev (1910–1975), Russian ballet dancer
- Aleksey Zhemchuzhnikov (1821–1908), Russian dramatist and poet

== Businesspeople ==
- Aleksey Alchevsky (1835–1901), Russian entrepreneur and philanthropist
- Alexei Barantsev (born 1959), Russian businessman
- Alexey Fedorychev (born 1955), Hungarian businessman
- Alexey Khotin (born 1974), Russian businessman
- Alexey Komissarov (born 1969), Russian entrepreneur
- Alexei Kozlov (businessman) (born 1974), Russian businessman
- Alexey Kuzmichev (born 1962), Russian businessman
- Alexey Miller (born 1962), Russian businessman
- Alexei Mordashov (born 1965), Russian businessman
- Alexei Motlokhov (born 1981/82), Russian hedge fund manager
- Aleksei Petrov (businessman) (1962–2023), Bulgarian businessman
- Alexey Pichugin (born 1962), Russian businessman
- Aleksei Putilov (1866–1940), Russian banker and exilee from the Soviet Union
- Aleksey Repik (born 1979), Russian businessman
- Alexey M. Reznikovich (born 1968), Soviet-born British investor
- Alexey Startsev (1838–1900), Russian merchant and industrialist
- Alexei Turchaninov (1705–1787), Russian business magnate
- Alexey Ustaev (born 1960), Bukharian Jewish entrepreneur
- Aleksey Semyonovich Vishnyakov (1859–1919), Russian entrepreneur and philanthropist

== Physical arts ==
- Aleksey Afanasyev (1850–1920), Russian painter
- Alexei Andreyuk (born 1959), Belarusian architect
- Aleksey Antropov (1716–1795), Russian painter
- Aleksey Beketov (1862–1941), Ukrainian architect
- Alexei Ivanovich Belsky (1726–1796), Russian painter
- Alexey Brodovitch (1898–1971), Russian-American art director
- Alexey Dushkin (1904–1977), Soviet architect
- Alexei Eriomin (1919–1998), Russian painter
- Aleksei Fedorov-Davydov (1900–1969), Soviet art historian
- Aleksey Gornostayev (1808–1862), Russian architect
- Alexei Grabco (1936–2016), Moldovan caricaturist and illustrator
- Alexis Gritchenko (1883–1977), Ukrainian painter
- Aleksei Gritsai (1914–1998), Soviet painter
- Alexei Harlamoff (1840–1925), Russian painter
- Alexei Karev (1879–1942), Russian painter
- Aleksey Kivshenko (1851–1895), Russian painter
- Alexey Klokov (born 1965), Russian painter
- Aleksey Kokel (1880–1956), Chuvash painter
- Alexey Rafaelovich Kolesnikov (born 1964), Ukrainian illustrator
- Alexey Komarov (1879–1977), Russian wildlife artist
- Alexei Komech (1936–2007), Russian architect and preservationist
- Aleksey Korin (1865–1923), Russian painter
- Alexey Korolyuk (1933–2002), Soviet sculptor and medallist
- Alexei Korzukhin (1835–1894), Russian painter
- Aleksei Ilyich Kravchenko (1889–1940), Russian painter
- Aleksey Lidov (1959–2025), Russian art historian
- Alexei Maximov (born 1952), Russian oil painter
- Aleksey Merinov (born 1959), Russian cartoonist
- Aleksey Morgunov (1884–1934), Russian painter
- Alexey Morosov (born 1974), Russian contemporary artist
- Alexei Mozhaev (1918–1994), Russian painter
- Alexey Orlovski (born 1963), Russian painter
- Alexei Pakhomov (1900–1973), Russian painter
- Alexey Parygin (born 1964), Russian painter
- Alexei Savrasov (1830–1897), Russian artist
- Alexey von Schlippe (1915–1988), Russian-American painter
- Alexey Sergienko (born 1968), Russian painter and mixed-media artist
- Alexey Shchusev (1873–1949), Russian architect
- Alexei Shulgin (born 1963), Russian contemporary artist
- Alexey Sorokin (fashion designer) (born 1981), Russian fashion designer
- Alexey Steele (born 1967), Soviet-American painter
- Alexei Stepanov (1858–1923), Russian painter
- Alexey Tarasovich Markov (1802–1878), Russian neoclassical painter
- Alexey Titarenko (born 1962), Soviet-American photographer
- Alexei Tsvetkov (sculptor) (1924–2009), Russian sculptor
- Alexey Tyranov (1808–1859), Russian painter
- Alexey Vaulin (born 1974), Russian graphic artist
- Alexey Venetsianov (1780–1847), Russian painter
- Alexey Voloskov (1822–1882), Russian landscape painter
- Alexei Yegorovich Yegorov (1776–1851), Russian neoclassical painter
- Alexey Zubov (1682–c. 1741), Russian etching artist

== Criminals ==
- Alexey Belan (born 1987), Latvian hacker
- Alexey Dobrovolsky (1938–2013), Soviet neo-Nazi
- Alexey Falkin (born 1982), Russian serial killer and rapist
- Alexey Gromov (serial killer) (born 1970), Russian serial killer who killed four women between 2006 and 2011
- Alexei Ivanov (serial killer) (born 1976), Russian serial killer who killed and dismembered four prostitutes
- Alexey Kruglov (born 1986), Serial killer who killed four children
- Alexey Mikhalenya (1984–2018), Belarusian serial killer who killed five people
- Alexey Milchakov (born 1991), Russian war criminal and animal abuser
- Aleksei Rjabkov (born 1964), Estonian serial killer who killed four people
- Alexey Ryzhkov (born 1972), Russian serial killer who murdered and raped four women
- Aleksey Sukletin (1943–1987), Soviet serial killer, rapist and cannibal
- Alexey Tigoyev (born 1970), Russian serial killer who killed between seven and nine people
- Alexei Varakin (born 1986), Uzbek serial killer who killed two prostitutes
- Alexey Vygovsky (born 1986), Russian serial killer who poisoned and killed 37 people on the Moscow metro

== Religion ==
- Aleksei (convert) (1425–1488), Russian archpriest who converted to Judaism
- Alexei Gaidukov (born 1974), Russian religious scholar
- Aleksei Glagolev (1901–1972), Ukrainian priest and Righteous Among the Nations
- Alexei Osipov (born 1938), Russian Orthodox theologian
- Alexey Rantala (1941–1984), Finnish Vicar-Bishop
- Alexei Shepelev (1840–1917), Ukrainian Orthodox saint and monk
- Aleksei Sokolov (1787–after 1833), Russian Orthodox priest and emigrant to Alaska Territory
- Alexei Trader (born 1965), American Orthodox Archbishop of Alaska
- Alexey Uminsky (born 1960), Russian orthodox priest
- Aleksei Zerchaninov (1848–1933), Russian Greek Catholic priest

== S.T.E.M. ==
- Aleksey Abrikosov (1875–1955), Soviet pathologist
- Alexei Abrikosov (physicist) (1928–2017), Soviet-American theoretical physicist
- Alexey Akindinov (born 1977), Russian ornamentalist artist
- Alexey Alexandrov (born 1933), Soviet thermal engineer
- Alexei Borisovich Aleksandrov (born 1954), Russian mathematician
- Alexey Anselm (1934–1998), Russian theoretical physicist
- Aleksei Bach (1857–1946), Soviet biochemist
- Aleksei Balandin (1898–1967), Soviet organic chemist
- Alexey Vladimir Bobrov (born 1969), Russian botonist
- Alexei Bogomolov (1913–2009), Russian radio engineer
- Alexei Alexeivich Bogdanov (1907–1971), Soviet geologist
- Alexei Blinov (1965–2019), Soviet-born British electrical engineer
- Alexey Vladimir Bobrov (born 1969), Russian botonist
- Alexei Bogdanov (chemist and molecular biologist) (born 1935), Russian scientist
- Alexei Borodin (born 1975), Russian-American mathematician
- Alexei Buzu (born 1983), Moldovan economist
- Alexei Byalynitsky-Birulya (1864–1937), Russian zoologist
- Alexey Bystrow (1899–1959), Soviet palaentologist
- Aleksei Chernavskii (1938–2023), Soviet mathematician
- Alexey Chervonenkis (1938–2014), Russian mathematician
- Aleksei Chichibabin (1871–1945), Russian organic chemist
- Alexey Diakonoff (1907–1989), Russian-Dutch entomologist
- Alexey Dobryden (1926–1980), Soviet metallurgist
- Alexei A. Efros (born 1975), American computer scientist
- Alexei L. Efros (born 1938), American physicist
- Alexey Ekimov (born 1945), Soviet physicist
- Alexey Favorsky (1860–1945), Russo-Soviet chemist
- Alexei V. Filippenko, full name of Alex Filippenko (born 1958), American astrophysicist
- Aleksei Filippov (mathematician) (1923–2006), Russian mathematician
- Alexei Fridman (1940–2008), Soviet physicist
- Alexey Gorgidze (1907–1992), Georgian mathematician and engineer
- Aleksei Gubarev (1931–2015), Soviet cosmonaut
- Alexei Gvishiani (born 1948), Soviet mathematician
- Aleksey Pavlovitch Hansky (1870–1908), Russian astronomer
- Aleksei Isaev (1908–1971), Soviet rocket engineer
- Alexey Ivakhnenko (1913–2007), Soviet mathematician
- Alexey Izmailov (born 1967), Russian mathematician
- Alexey Karpenko (born 1949), Ukrainian psychophysiologist and biologist
- Alexey Kavokin (born 1970), Soviet-French professor of physics
- Alexei Kharitonenkov, Russian-American endocrinologist
- Alexei Kitaev (born 1963), Russian-American physicist
- Alexey Kondrashov (born 1957), Soviet-American geneticist
- Aleksei Korotnev (1854–1914), Russian zoologist
- Alexei Kostrikin (1929–2000), Russo-Soviet mathematician
- Alexei Koulakov, Russian-American theoretical physicist and neuroscientist
- Aleksei Kozhevnikov (1836–1902), Russian neurologist
- Alexey Yakovlevich Kuznetsov (1910–1969), Soviet engineer
- Alexey Kylasov (born 1968), Russian cultural anthropologist
- Alexei Leonov (1934–2019), Soviet cosmonaut, first person to conduct a spacewalk
- Alexey Leontiev (1917–1987), Russian mathematician
- Aleksey Letnikov (1837–1888), Russian mathematician
- Alexei Likhachyov (1894–1948), Russian state physician
- Aleksei Lotman (born 1960), Estonian biologist and environmentalist
- Alexey Lyapunov (1911–1973), Soviet mathematician
- Aleksey Malchevskiy (1915–1985), Soviet ornithologist
- Aleksei Markushevich (1908–1979), Russian mathematician
- Alexey Morozov (born 1961), Russian theoretical physicist
- Alexey Okladnikov (1908–1981), Soviet archaeologist
- Alexey Olenin (1763–1843), Russian archaeologist and curator
- Alexey Olovnikov (1936–2022), Russian biologist
- Aleksey Ovchinin (born 1971), Russian cosmonaut
- Aleksei Parshin (1942–2022), Russian mathematician
- Alexei Petrovich Pavlov (1854–1929), Russian palaentologist
- Alexey Peshekhonov (1867–1933), Russian economist and statistician
- Alexey A. Petrov (born 1971), Soviet-American physicist
- Aleksei Zinovyevich Petrov (1910–1972), Soviet mathematician
- Alexey Pleshakov (born 1954), Russian chemical engineer
- Aleksei Pogorelov (1919–2002), Soviet mathematician
- Alexey Pokrovskiy, British mathematician
- Alexey Georgiyevich Postnikov (1921–1995), Russian mathematician
- Alexei Rezepkin (born 1949), Russian archaeologist
- Aleksei Rumyantsev (1905–1993), Soviet economist
- Alexey G. Ryazanov (born 1962), Soviet-born molecular biologist
- Alexei Semenov (mathematician) (born 1950), Russian mathematician
- Alexei Severinsky, Soviet-born American electrical engineer
- Alexey Severtsev (born 1961), Russian surgeon
- Alexei Severtsov (1866–1936), Russian zoologist
- Alexei Vasilievich Shubnikov (1887–1970), Russian crystallographer
- Aleksey Borisovich Silayev (1906–1989), Soviet chemist
- Alexei Simașchevici (1929–2026), Moldovan physicist
- Alexei Skorobogatov (born 1961), British-Russian mathematician
- Alexey Skvortsov (1920–2008), Russian botonist
- Alexei Smirnov (physicist) (born 1951), Russian neutrino physicist
- Alexey Mikhailovich Sokolov (born 1972), Russian transportation engineer
- Aleksey Sorokin (officer) (1931–1976), Russian cosmonautical doctor
- Alexey Stakhov (1939–2021), Ukrainian mathematician and engineer
- Alexei Starobinsky (1948–2023), Russian theoretical physicist
- Aleksei Sveshnikov (1924–2022), Russian mathematical physicist
- Aleksei Talisainen (born 1980), Estonian computer scientist
- Aleksei Turovski (born 1946), Estonian zoologist
- Alexei Verkhratsky (born 1961), Ukrainian neurophysiologist
- Alexey Vikhlinin (born 1970), Russian-American astrophysicist
- Alexei Vranich (born 1968), American anthropologist
- Alexei Ukhtomsky (1875–1942), Russian physiologist
- Aleksey Uvarov (1825–1884), Russian archaeologist
- Alexei Tsvelik (born 1954), Russian theoretical physicist
- Alexei Venkov (born 1946), Russian mathematician
- Alexei Ivanovich Vvedensky (1898–1972), Russo-Soviet botanist
- Aleksei Yeliseyev (born 1934), Soviet cosmonaut and spacewalker
- Alexei Yurchak (born 1960), Soviet-born American professor of anthropology
- Aleksei Zachvatkin (1905–1950), Russian entomologist
- Aleksei Konstantinovich Zagulyaev (1924–2007), Russian entomologist
- Alexei Zamolodchikov (1952–2007), Russian physicist
- Alexei Zavarzin (born 1984), Russian biologist
- Alexey Zubritsky (born 1992), Russian cosmonaut

== Humanities ==
- Aleksei Aleksandrovich Kozlov (1831–1901), Russian philosopher
- Aleksei Barannikov (linguist) (1890–1952), Russian linguist of Indian languages
- Alexei Chernyaevsky (1840–1894), Russian-born Azerbaijani educator
- Alexei I. Miller (born 1959), Russian historian
- Alexey Kharuzin (1864–1932), Russian ethnographer
- Aleksey Khomyakov (1804–1860), Russian philosopher
- Alexei Kondratiev (1949–2010), American scholar specializing in Celtic languages and cultures
- Aleksei Leontiev (1903–1979), Soviet developmental psychologist
- Aleksei Losev (1893–1988), Russian philosopher and philologist
- Alexei Mirtov (1886–1966), Russian linguist
- Alexey Postnikov (born 1939), Soviet historian
- Aleksey Shakhmatov (1864–1920), Russian philologist
- Alexei Strolman (c. 1811–1898), Russian mining engineer and historian
- Alexei Vasiliev (historian) (born 1939), Russian historian of African and Arab histories

=== Literature ===
- Aleksei Adzhubei (1924–1993), Soviet journalist
- Aleksey Apukhtin (1840–1893), Russian poet
- Aleksei Bibik (1878–1976), Soviet dramatist
- Alexei Bueno (1963–2026), Brazilian poet
- Aleksey Chapygin (1870–1937), Russian novelist
- Alexei Dzermant (born 1979), Kazakh-born Belarusian journalist
- Alexey Eisner (1905–1984), Russian writer
- Alexey Galakhov (1807–1892), Russian author
- Alexey Gogua (1932–2025), Abkhazian writer
- Alexei Ivanov (writer) (born 1969), Russian writer
- Alexey Ivanov-Classic (1841–1894), Russian writer and poet
- Aleksey Khovansky (publisher) (1814–1889), Russian publisher
- Aleksey Koltsov (1809–1942), Russian poet
- Alexei Kosterin (1896–1968), Soviet writer and civil rights activist
- Alexey Kovalev (journalist) (born 1981), Russian journalist
- Aleksei Kruchyonykh (1886–1968), Soviet futurist writer
- Alexei Mateevici (1888–1917), Writer of the Moldovan national anthem
- Aleksey Merzlyakov (1778–1830), Russian poet and critic
- Aleksei Musin-Pushkin (1744–1817), Russian manuscript collector
- Aleksey Nepomniaschiy, Ukrainian journalist
- Aleksey Novikov-Priboy (1877–1944), Soviet author
- Alexei Panshin (1940–2022), American writer and critic
- Alexei Parshchikov (1954–2009), Russian poet and translator
- Aleksey Pisemsky (1821–1881), Russian novelist
- Aleksey Pleshcheyev (1825–1893), Russian poet
- Alexei Purin (born 1955), Russian poet
- Aleksey Remizov (1877–1957), Russian modernist writer
- Alexei Rudeanu (1939–2013), Romanian author
- Alexei Maxim Russell (born 1976), Canadian author
- Alexei Sayle (born 1952), English comedian and author
- Aleksey Slapovsky (1957–2023), Russian novelist
- Alexei Stupin (1844–1915), Russian publisher
- Alexey Surkov (1899–1983), Soviet poet and writer
- Aleksey Suvorin (1834–1912), Russian publisher
- Aleksey Konstantinovich Tolstoy (1817–1875), Russian historical dramatist
- Aleksey Nikolayevich Tolstoy (1883–1945), Russian and Soviet writer
- Alexei Tsvetkov (poet) (1947–2022), Russian writer
- Alexey Veselovsky (1843–1918), Russian literary historian
- Aleksey Vysotsky (1919–1977), Soviet writer and veteran

== Music ==
- Alexei Abella (born 2002), Filipino singer
- Alexei Aigui (born 1971), Russian violinist
- Alexey Arkhipovsky (born 1967), Russian balalaika player
- Alexei Borisov (born 1960), Russian musician
- Alexey Borozdin (born 1937), Russian musician
- Alexey Botvinov (born 1964), Ukrainian pianist
- Alexei Davidov (1867–1940), Russian cellist and composer
- Alexey Ekimyan (1927–1982), Armenian composer
- Aleksey Garnizov (born 1963), Russian composer
- Alexey Glyzin (born 1954), Soviet singer
- Aleksey Goman (born 1983), Russian pop singer
- Alexei Gorokhov (1927–1999), Soviet violinist
- Alexei Haieff (1914–1994), Russian-born American composer
- Aleksey Igudesman (born 1973), Soviet-born German violinist
- Aleksey Ivanovich Kandinsky (1918–2000), Russian musicologist
- Alexei Karabanov (born 1961), Russian military musician
- Alexei Karamazov, stage name of Mark Ettinger, American musician
- Alexei Khvostenko (1940–2004), Russian musician and poet
- Alexey Kokhanov (born 1981), Russian singer
- Alexei Kornienko (born 1954), Russian-Austrian conductor and pianist
- Aleksei Kozlov (musician) (born 1935), Russian saxophonist
- Aleksey Kozlovsky (1905–1977), Soviet composer
- Alexey Kudrya (born 1982), Russian operatic tenor
- Aleksey Kuznetsov (guitarist) (born 1941), Russian composer and guitarist
- Alexei Lubimov (born 1944), Russian pianist
- Alexei Lvov (1798–1870), Russian composer
- Aleksei Maslennikov (1929–2016), Russian opera tenor
- Aleksey Nasedkin (1942–2014), Russian pianist
- Alexei Perry, Canadian musician and poet
- Aleksey Potekhin (born 1972), Russian pop musician
- Alexey Retinsky (born 1986), Russian composer
- Alexei Rodriguez, Puerto Rican drummer
- Alexei Romanenko, Russian-born cellist
- Alexei Rumiantsev (born 1969), Russian musician and composer
- Alexey Rybnikov (born 1945), Russian composer
- Aleksey Semenenko (born 1988), Ukrainian-German violinist
- Alexey Shalashov (born 1952), Russian violinist
- Aleksey Shishkin (fl. 1887), Russian Romani composer
- Alexey Shor (born 1970), Soviet-born American composer
- Alexei Soutchkov (born 1966), Russian pianist
- Alexey Stadler (born 1991), Russian cellist
- Alexei Stanchinsky (1888–1914), Russian composer
- Alexey Steblev (born 1972), Russian composer
- Alexei Sultanov (1969–2005), Uzbek-American pianist
- Alexey Titov (1769–1827), Russian composer
- Alexey Tsereteli (1864– 1942), Georgian opera singer and prince
- Alexey Verstovsky (1799–1862), Russian composer
- Alexey Vishnya (born 1964), Russian musician
- Alexei Volodin (born 1977), Russian pianist
- Alexey Vorobyov (born 1988), Russian singer and actor
- Aleksey Weintraub (born 1985), identity of American rapper Lakutis
- Alexey Zhigalkovich (born 1996), Belarusian singer and competitor in JESC 2007
- Aleksey Zhilin (1766–1848), Russian composer
- Aleksey Zhivotov (1904–1964), Russian composer
- Alexey Zuev (born 1982), Russian pianist

== Politics ==
=== Politicians ===
- Aleksey Aleksandrov (born 1952), Russian politician
- Aleksey Arakcheyev (1769–1834), Russian general and statesman
- Alexei Arbatov (born 1951), Russian political scientist
- Aleksei Argun (1937–2008), Abkhazian government minister
- Aleksey Avramenko (1977–2023), Belarusian politician
- Aleksey Baburin (born 1949), Russian-born Ukrainian Communist politician
- Alexei Badayev (1883–1951), Soviet politician
- Alexei Barbăneagră (born 1945), Moldovan Minister of Justice
- Alexey Barinov (born 1951), Russian politician
- Aleksey Belyakov (1907–1992), Soviet diplomat
- Aleksei Bespalikov (1948–2021), Russian politician
- Alexey Besprozvannykh (born 1979), Russian governor of the Kaliningrad Oblast
- Alexey Bestuzhev-Ryumin (1693–1766), Russian diplomat and chancellor
- Aleksei Bobrinsky (historian) (1852–1927), Russian statesman and historian
- Alexey Bogdanov (born 1973), Belarusian ambassador
- Alexei Bolshakov (politician) (1939–2017), Russian politician
- Aleksei Chaly (born 1961), Russian politician
- Aleksey Chekunkov (born 19800, Belarusian-born Russian politician
- Alexey Chepa (born 1955), Russian politician
- Alexey Cherkassky (1680–1742), Russian statesman
- Alexey Chernyak (born 1973), Russian politician
- Alexey Chernyshov (born 1963), Russian politician
- Alexey Chernyshyov (born 1939), Russian politician
- Alexey Chesnakov (born 1970), Azerbaijani-born Russian political scientist
- Aleksey Chuyanov (1905–1977), Soviet politician
- Alexei Cracan (born 1960), Moldovan diplomat
- Alexey Davydov (1970s–2013), Russian LGBT activist
- Alexey Dedov (born 1960), Russian diplomat
- Alexei Didenko (born 1983), Russian politician
- Alexey Dmitrienko (born 1972), Russian politician
- Alexey Dolgorukov (1767–1834), Russian statesman
- Alexey Grigoryevich Dolgorukov (died 1734), Russian statesman
- Aleksey Dyumin (born 1972), Russian politician
- Alexey Gordeyev (born 1955), Russian politician
- Aleksey Govyrin (born 1983), Russian politician
- Aleksei Gretshanov (1897–?), Estonian politician
- Alexey Gromov (born 1960), Russian politician
- Aleksei Ignatiev (1842–1906), Russian politician who was assassinated
- Alexey Ignatyev (1877–1954), Russian military attache and diplomat
- Aleksei Jevgrafov (born 1979), Estonian politician
- Aleksey Karyakin (born 1980), Russian politician
- Alexey Kanayev (born 1971), Rusisan politician
- Alexey Kazannik (1941–2019), Russian politician
- Aleksey Kirichenko (1908–1975), Soviet politician
- Aleksey Kleshchev (1905–1968), Belarusian politician and major general
- Aleksey Kochetkov (born 1971), Russian political analyst
- Aleksey Kokorin (born 1961), Russian politician
- Aleksey Kondratenko (born 1969), Russian politician
- Aleksey Kondratyev (born 1971), Russian politician
- Alexey Kornienko (politician) (born 1976), Russian politician
- Alexei Kosygin (1904–1980), Soviet statesman and Premier of the Soviet Union
- Alexey Kravtsov (born 1978), Russian jurist and politician
- Alexey Krutikov (politician) (1902–1962), Soviet politician
- Alexei Kudrin (born 1960), Russian politician
- Alexey Kulemzin (born 1974), Mayor of Donetsk
- Alexey Kurakin (1759–1829), Russian statesman
- Alexey Kurinny (born 1974), Russian politician
- Aleksey Kuropatkin (1848–1925), Russian imperial minister
- Aleksei Kushnarenko (born 1975), Belarusian politician
- Aleksey Kuzmitsky (born 1967), Russian politician
- Alexey Kuznetsov (1905–1950), Soviet politician
- Aleksey Kuznetsov (politician) (born 1971), Russian politician
- Aleksey Lavrinenko (born 1955), Russian politician
- Aleksey Lebed (1955–2019), Russian politician
- Alexey Likhachev (born 1962), Russian energy official
- Alexey Limanzo, Siberian indigenous politician
- Aleksey Lobanov-Rostovsky (1824–1896), Russian diplomat
- Alexei Lungu (born 1983), Moldovan politician and journalist
- Alexei Lyakhnovich (born 1977), Belarusian politician
- Alexey Vasilyevich Makarov (1674–1740), Russian statesman and diplomat
- Aleksey Malashenko (1951–2023), Russian political scientist
- Alexei Mayorov (born 1961), Russian politician
- Aleksey Mitrofanov (born 1962), Russian politician
- Aleksei Müürisepp (1902–1970), Soviet politician
- Alexey Nechayev (born 1966), Russian politician and businessman
- Alexey Nikitin (politician) (1876–1939), Russian politician
- Alexey Obukhov (1937–2022), Soviet diplomat
- Aleksey Orlov (politician) (born 1961), Russian politician
- Alexey Ostrovsky (born 1976), Russian politician
- Alexey Overchuk (born 1964), Russian politician
- Alexey Pakhomov (born 1945), Russian politician
- Aleksei Palm (1887–1942), Estonian politician
- Alexey Panteleev (1959–2026), Russian politician
- Alexey Podberezkin (born 1953), Russian politician
- Aleksey Pushkov (born 1954), Russian politician
- Alexey Razumovsky (born 1748), Russian statesman and count
- Aleksei Rodionov (diplomat) (1922–2013), Soviet diplomat
- Aleksey Russkikh (born 1968), Russian politician and governor of Ulyanovsk Oblast
- Aleksey Ryabinin (born 1970), Russian ombudsman and businessman
- Alexey Rykov (1881–1938), Bolshevik revolutionary and Soviet politician
- Alexey Saltykov (1806–1859), Russian prince and diplomat
- Aleksey Sandikov (born 1983), Armenian politician
- Aleksei Shaposhnikov (politician) (born 1973), Russian politician
- Alexey Shebarshin (born 1959), Russian diplomat
- Alexey Shitikov (1912–1993), Soviet politician
- Alexey Shpeyer (1854–1916), Russian diplomat
- Aleksei Sinitsyn (born 1976), Russian politician
- Alexey Sitnikov (politician, born 1966), Russian politician
- Alexei Smirnov (politician) (born 1973), Russian governor of Kursk Oblast
- Alexei Snegov (1898–1989), Old Bolshevik and Soviet politician
- Aleksei Sorokin (politician) (1888–1933), Russo-Estonian politician
- Aleksei Stetskii (1896–1938), Soviet politician and propagandist
- Aleksey Teksler (born 1973), Russian politician
- Alexey Tkachov (born 1957), Russian politician
- Aleksey Trubetskoy (1600–1680), Russian military diplomat
- Alexey Tsoy (born 1977), Kazakh politician
- Alexey Tsydenov (born 1976), Russian politician
- Alexey Ulyukaev (born 1956), Russian politician
- Alexey Veller (born 1966), Russian politician
- Aleksei Volkov (politician) (1890–1942), Soviet politician
- Alexey Volotskov (born 1981), Russian politician
- Alexey Voyevoda (born 1980), Russian athlete and politician
- Aleksey Yachmenev (1866–1937), Aleut chief
- Aleksei Yegorov (jurist) (born 1969), Russian politician
- Alexei Yepishev (1908–1985), Soviet politician and general
- Alexei Yerkhov (born 1960), Russian diplomat
- Aleksey Yermolov (1777–1861), Russian diplomat
- Aleksey Yermolov (politician) (1847–1917), Russian politician
- Alexey Yezubov (born 1948), Russian politician
- Aleksey Zhuravlyov (politician) (born 1962), Russian politician
- Alexey Zlobin (1935–2025), Russian politician

=== Military ===
- Alexey Abaza (1853–1915), Russian admiral
- Alexey Akhmanov (1897–1949), Soviet lieutenant-general
- Aleksey Alelyukhin (1920–1990), Soviet flying ace
- Aleksei Antonov (1896–1962), Soviet general
- Alexei Arapov (1906–1943), Soviet soldier killed in WWII
- Alexei Arbuzov (general) (1792–1861), Russian military general
- Alexei Ivanovich Avtonomov (1890–1919), Russian military commander
- Aleksei Baiov (1871–1935), Russian army officer
- Aleksei Baksov (1907–1986), Soviet army colonel general
- Alexei Berest (1921–1970), Soviet soldier who raised the Victory Banner over the Reichstag building
- Alexei Berngard (born 1978), Russian military colonel
- Aleksei Birilev (1844–1915), Russian admiral
- Aleksey Botyan (1917–2020), Russo-Soviet intelligence officer
- Aleksei Brovkin (1906–1983), Ukrainian Militsiya
- Aleksei Brusilov (1853–1926), Russian general
- Aleksey Burdeyny (1908–1987), Soviet colonel-general
- Aleksei Butovsky (1838–1917), Russian general and Olympic founder
- Alexey Buturlin (1802–1863), Russian lieutenant general and nobleman
- Aleksey Domantovich (1846–1908), Cossack commander active in Persia
- Aleksei Evert (1857–1918?), Russian general
- Alexei Fofanov (1915–1986), Soviet military commander
- Aleksey Galkin (born 1970), Russian military officer
- Alexey Gamen (1773–1829), Russian lieutenant-general
- Aleksey Greig (1775–1845), Russian admiral
- Aleksey Gorchakov (1769–1817), Russian general and statesman
- Aleksei Aleksandrovich Grechkin (1893–1964), Soviet army commander
- Aleksey Gubanov (1918–1982), Soviet fighter pilot
- Aleksei Gutor (1868–1938), Russian lieutenant-general
- Aleksey Inauri (1908–1993), Soviet Georgian commander
- Alexey Kaledin (1861–1918), Russian general
- Aleksey Khlobystov (1918–1943), Soviet fighter pilot
- Alexei Kim (born 1958), Russian colonel-general
- Alexei Kondaurov (born 1949), Russian KGB general
- Aleksey Kovalev (1925–1997), Soviet soldier
- Alexey Kozlov (intelligence officer) (1934–2015), Soviet intelligence officer
- Alexey V. Kravtsov (1879–1918), Russian general killed in the Russian Civil War
- Alexey Nikolayevich Krutikov (1895–1949), Soviet military officer
- Aleksey Krylov (1863–1945), Russian naval engineer
- Alexey Kuzmenkov (born 1971), Russian military commander
- Alexey Kurkin (1901–1948), Soviet colonel-general
- Alexei Grigoryevich Orlov (1737–1808), Russian military commander
- Alexey Manikovsky (1865–1920), Russian general
- Alexey Maslov (1953–2022), Russian general
- Aleksey Maresyev (1916–2001), Soviet WWII flying ace
- Aleksey Mazurenko (1917–2004), Soviet general-major
- Aleksey Melissino (1759–1813), Russian military commander
- Alexey Mikhaylov (officer) (1895–1941), Soviet colonel killed in WWII
- Alexey Moskovsky (born 1947), Russian army general
- Aleksey Mozgovoy (1975–2015), Luhansk military commander
- Alexey Muravyov (1900–1941), Soviet colonel killed in WWII
- Alexey Nagayev (1704–1781), Russian hydrographer, cartographer, and admiral
- Aleksey Nagin (1981–2022), Russian army officer
- Aleksey Naumov (officer) (1923–1943), Soviet tank commander
- Aleksey Nemkov (1919–1972), Soviet military captain
- Alexey Obolensky (1819–1884), Russian artillery general
- Alexey Fyodorovich Orlov (1787–1862), Russian diplomat and commander in the Napoleonic Wars
- Alexei Grigoryevich Orlov (1737–1808), Russian military officer
- Alexei Polivanov (1855–1920), Russian infantry-general
- Aleksey Polosin (1924–1943), Soviet military sergeant
- Alexei Panfilov (1898–1986), Soviet military lieutenant-general
- Aleksey Pasko (1916–1997), Soviet junior army lieutenant
- Aleksey Perelet (1914–1953), Soviet test pilot
- Aleksey Poteleshchenko (1976–2024), Russian-Ukrainian military collaborationist
- Aleksey Prokhorov (1922–2002), Soviet air force pilot
- Alexei Radzievsky (1911–1978), Soviet WWII soldier
- Alexey Rodin (1902–1955), Soviet army colonel general
- Alexei Rodionov (general) (1853–1919), Russian Cossack general
- Alexei Roibu (born 1954), Moldovan security official
- Aleksey Ryazanov (pilot) (1920–1992), Soviet flying ace
- Alexey Schastny (1881–1918), Russian naval commander
- Alexey Selivanov (1900–1949), Soviet lieutenant-general
- Alexei Senyavin (1716–1797), Russian naval admiral
- Aleksey Shakhurin (1904–1975), Soviet bureaucrat and general
- Aleksei Shcherbatov (1776–1848), Russian general
- Aleksei Shein (1662–1700), Russian commander
- Aleksey Smirnov (pilot) (1917–1987), Soviet fighter pilot
- Aleksey Solomatin (1921–1943), Soviet flying ace
- Alexey Sorokin (admiral) (1922–2020), Soviet admiral
- Alexey Stakhovich (1856–1919), Russian cavalry guard and stage actor
- Alexey Sudayev (1912–1946), Soviet firearm designer
- Alexey Tereshkov (1893–1960), Soviet lieutenant general
- Aleksey Tillo (1839–1900), Russian cartographer and lieutenant general
- Aleksey Trubetskoy (1600–1680), Russian voivode
- Aleksey Tupolev (1925–2001), Soviet aircraft designer
- Alexei Vinogradov (1899–1940), Soviet commander
- Aleksey Vlasenko (1906–1950), Soviet army general
- Aleksey Zhadov (1886–1945), Soviet army officer

=== Dissidents ===
- Aleksey Adashev (died 1561), Russian statesman and political prisoner
- Aleksei Aladin (1873–1927), Russian politician and exilee to England
- Alexei Antonovich of Brunswick (1746–1787), Russian royal and political prisoner
- Alexey Bakulin (1899–1939), Soviet politician and victim of the Great Purge
- Aleksey Belevsky-Zhukovsky (1871–c. 1931), Russian nobleman and murder victim
- Aleksei Bogolyubov (1854–1887), name of pseudonymic Russian Revolutionary Arkhip Bogolyubov
- Alexei Borovoi (1875–1935), Russian anarchist
- Alexey Cherepennikov (1869–1937), Russian major general and victim of the Great Purge
- Alexei Devotchenko (1965–2014), Russian activist and murder victim
- Aleksei Dressen (born 1968), Estonian counterintelligence officer
- Alexey Dymovsky (born 1977), Russian anti-corruption activist
- Aleksei Gan (died 1942), Russian anarchist
- Alexey Gaskarov (born 1985), Russian opposition activist
- Aleksei Gastev (1882–1939), Soviet revolutionary and victim of the Great Purge
- Alexei Gorinov (born 1961), Russian anti-war activist and politician prisoner
- Alexey Georgievich Kabanov (1890–1972), Soviet revolutionary
- Alexei Khvostov (1872–1918), Russian politician and anti-Soviet dissident
- Aleksei Kiselyov (politician) (1879–1937), Soviet politician and victim of the Great Purge
- Aleksey Kulak (1922–1984), Soviet counterintelligence officer
- Alexei Medvedev (politician) (1884–1937), Russian politician and victim of the Great Purge
- Alexey Minyaylo (born 1985), Russian political activist
- Alexei Navalny (1976–2024), Russian opposition leader
- Aleksei Nikitin (revolutionary) (1870–1938), Russian revolutionary
- Alexey Pivovarov (born 1974), Russian television host and opposition journalist
- Alexei Pokotilov (1879–1904), Russian terrorist and assassin of Vyacheslav von Plehve
- Aleksei Relke, Russian Luhansk militant separatist
- Aleksey Rogov (politician) (1886–1950), Bolshevik revolutionary
- Alexei Sidorov (1971–2003), Russian journalist and murder victim
- Alexei Sklyarenko (1870–1916), Russian revolutionary
- Alexey Skulachenko (1895–1937), Russian military officer and victim of the Great Purge
- Aleksei Solonovich (1887–1937), Russian academic and victim of the Great Purge
- Alexei Trupp (1856–1918), Head footman of the Romanov royal family, executed by Bolshevik revolutionaries, and a martyr of the Russian Orthodox Church
- Alexei Vinogradov (1899–1940), Soviet military officer executed for his failures during the Winter War
- Aleksei Andreyevich Volkov (1859–1929), Russian court valet and survivor of the Bolshevik Revolution
- Alexei Voshchakin (1898–1937), Soviet artist and victim of the Great Purge
- Alexei Zimin (1971–2024), Russian dissident

== Sportspeople ==
- Alexei Aidarov (born 1974), Belarusian biathlete
- Aleksey Akatyev (born 1974), Russian swimmer
- Aleksey Aksyonov (born 1987), Russian sprinter
- Aleksey Alipov (born 1975), Russian sport shooter
- Alexei Almoukov (born 1990), Russian biathlete
- Alexey Andryunin (bon 1976), Russian bobsledder
- Alexey Ashapatov (born 1973), Russian paralympic athlete
- Aleksey Babadjanov (born 1978), Uzbekistani sprint canoer
- Aleksey Bannikov (born 1973), Kazakhstani skier
- Aleksei Barannikov (skier) (born 1975), Soviet Nordic combined skier
- Aleksey Baranov (skier) (born 1954), Soviet skier
- Aleksei Barkalov (1946–2004), Ukrainian water polo player
- Aleksey Basov (born 1977), Russian racing driver
- Aleksey Bazarov (born 1963), Soviet-born Israeli hurdler
- Alexei Beletski (born 1979), Soviet-born Israeli ice dancer
- Alexei Bell (wrestler) (born 1990), Cuban Greco-Roman wrestler
- Aleksey Belyayev (born 1985), Kazakh speed skater
- Aleksey Bochkov (1970–2015), Russian cyclist
- Alexei Bondarenko (born 1978), Russian gymnast and olympic silver medalist
- Aleksey Borovitin (born 1954), Soviet ski jumper
- Aleksey Bortkov (born 1976), Russian weightlifter
- Aleksei Brianskiy (born 1997), Russian swimmer
- Aleksei Budõlin (born 1976), Estonian judoka
- Alexey Bugaev (born 1997), Russian skier
- Aleksey Butsenin (born 1976), Russian swimmer
- Alexei Bychenko (born 1988), Ukrainian-born Israeli figure skater
- Alexey Bychenok (born 1986), Russian paralympian
- Aleksey Cheglakov (born 1974), Russian-Uzbekistani wrestler
- Alexei Cherchnev (born 1979), Russian judoka
- Aleksey Cheremisinov (born 1985), Russian fencer
- Aleksey Chervotkin (born 1995), Russian skier
- Alexey Cheskidov (born 1977), Russian triathlete
- Alexey Chubrevich, full name of Alex Chubrevich (born 1986), Soviet-Israeli basketball player
- Aleksey Chudinov (1972–1997), Russo-Soviet boxer
- Aleksey Chuklin (born 1985), Russian racing driver
- Aleksei Churkin (born 1998), Russian paralympian
- Alexey Churkin (born 2004), Kazakhstani weightlifter
- Alexei Collado (born 1988), Cuban boxer
- Aleksey Denisenko (born 1993), Russian taekwondo practitioner
- Alexey Dergunov (born 1984), Kazakhstani sprint canoer
- Aleksey Desyatchikov (1932–2018), Soviet runner
- Aleksey Dmitrik (born 1984), Russian high jumper
- Alexey Dmitriyenko (born 1976), Kazakh gymnast
- Aleksei Dronov, Russian boxer and Youth Olympic gold medalist
- Aleksey Drozdov (born 1983), Russian decathlete
- Aleksey Dryomin (born 1989), Russian sprinter
- Alexei Dudchenko (born 1984), Russian acrobatic gymnast
- Aleksey Dudukalo (born 1976), Russian racing driver
- Aleksey Dyachenko (born 1978), Russian sabre fencer
- Alexey Egorov (born 1991), Russian boxer
- Alexey Erokhov, (born 1999), Russian figure skater
- Alexey Fadeyev (born 1977), Russian Nordic combined athlete
- Aleksey Fatyanov (born 1969), Azerbaijani triple jumper
- Alexey Fernandes Falcone, full name of Alê Falcone (born 1990), Brazilian futsal player
- Aleksey Filimonov (born 1981), Russian swimmer
- Alexey Filipets (born 1978), Russian swimmer
- Alexey Filonov (born 1961), Russian swimmer
- Aleksei Fokin (born 1997), Russian handball player
- Alexey Fomenkov, Russian paralympic swimmer
- Aleksey Frantsuzov (born 1971), Russian handball player
- Aleksey Frosin (born 1978), Russian fencer
- Aleksey Fyodorov (triple jumper) (born 1991), Russian triple jumper
- Aleksei Ganiuk (born 1999), Russian Paralympic swimmer
- Aleksey Glushkov (born 1975), Russian wrestler and olympic bronze medalist
- Aleksey Golovin (bobsleigh) (born 1962), Russian bobsledder
- Aleksey Gorlachov (born 1981), Russian luger
- Alexei Gorshkov (born 1967), Russian ice dancing coach
- Aleksei Grishin (born 1979), Belarusian skier and olympic gold medalist
- Alexey Gurman (born 1978), Kazakh diver
- Aleksey Gushchin (1922–1986), Soviet sport shooter
- Alexey Gussarov (born 1995), Kazakhstani long-distance runner
- Alexey Ignashov (born 1978), Belarusian kickboxer
- Aleksei Ignatovich (born 1986), Belarusian gymnast
- Aleski Igraev (born 1972), Ukrainian sprint canoeist
- Alexey Ivanov (athlete) (born 1979), Russian paralympic athlete
- Aleksei Kadochnikov (born 1985), Russian darts player
- Alexey Kamanin (born 1978), Russian handball player
- Alexei Kamenski, Russian sport shooter
- Aleksey Kamkin (born 1952), Soviet rower and olympic silver medalist
- Alexey Kamnev (born 1979), Russian curler
- Aleksei Kapoura (born 1959), Russian paralympic swimmer
- Alexey Karpov (coach) (born 1952), Russian swimming coach
- Aleksey Katulevsky (born 1978), Kyrgyz boxer
- Aleksey Kazakov (born 1976), Russian Tatar volleyball player and Olympic silver medalist
- Alexey Kedryuk (born 1980), Kazakhstani tennis player
- Alexei Kervezee (born 1989), Dutch cricketer
- Aleksey Khatylyov (born 1983), Belarusian speed skater
- Aleksey Khovansky (fencer) (born 1987), Russian fencer
- Alexey Khovrin (born 1973), Kazakh swimmer
- Alexei Kiliakov (born 2005), Israeli-American ice dancer
- Alexey Kireev (born 1985), Russian bobsledder
- Aleksei Kiselyov (boxer) (1938–2005), Soviet boxer
- Alexei Klimov (born 1975), Russian sport shooter
- Aleksey Kobelev (born 1971), Russian biathlete
- Alexei Kogalev (born 1966), Soviet-Belgian diver
- Alexey Kolessov (born 1984), Kazakhstani cyclist
- Aleksey Komarov (1921–2013), Soviet rower
- Aleksei Konakh (born 1987), Belarusian badminton player
- Aleksey Konov (born 1938), Soviet middle-distance runner
- Aleksey Korneev (born 1998), Russian racing driver
- Alexey Korolev (born 1987), Kazakh ski jumper
- Alexey Korovashkov (born 1992), Russian canoeist
- Aleksey Kostygov (born 1973), Russian handball player
- Aleksei Kotishevskiy (born 1985), Russian basketball player
- Alexey Kovrigin (born 1981), Soviet swimmer
- Alexei Kozlov (figure skater) (born 1979), Estonian figure skater
- Alexei Krasnozhon (born 2000), Russian-American figure skater
- Aleksey Kriventsov (born 1974), Belarusian swimmer
- Alexey Krivoruchko (born 1975), Russian defense minister
- Aleksey Krupnyakov (born 1978), Kyrgyz wrestler
- Alexey Kudin (born 1984), Belarusian MMA fighter
- Aleksey Kudryavtsev (born 1972), Russian swimmer
- Aleksey Kuleshov (born 1979), Russian volleyball player
- Alexey Kuleshov (beach volleyball) (born 1987), Kazakhstani beach volleyball player
- Alexey Kuleshov (beach volleyball) (born 1987), Kazakh beach volleyball player
- Alexey Kulikov (born 1994), Russian curler
- Alexey Kunchenko (born 1984), Russian MMA fighter
- Alexey Kunshin (born 1987), Russian cyclist
- Alexey Kurbatov (born 1994), Russian cyclist
- Aleksy Kuziemski (born 1977), Polish boxer
- Aleksey Kuznetsov (swimmer) (born 1968), Russian swimmer
- Aleksey Kuznetsov (skier) (1929–2003), Soviet skier
- Alexey Kuznetsov (field athlete) (born 1981), Russian paralympic athlete
- Alexey Labzin (born 1978), Russian paralympic sprinter
- Aleksey Lebedev (luger) (born 1982), Russian luger
- Aleksey Lelin (1977–2026), Belarusian high jumper
- Aleksei Leonov (archer) (born 1987), Russian paralympic archer
- Aleksey Lesnichiy (born 1978), Belarusian high jumper
- Alexei Lezin (born 1973), Russian boxer
- Alexey Liventsov (born 1981), Russian table tennis player
- Aleksey Lovchev (born 1989), Russian weightlifter
- Alexey Lukyanuk (born 1980), Russian rally driver
- Alexey Lutsenko (born 1992), Kazakhstani cyclist
- Alexey Lyalko (born 1985), Kazakhstani cyclist
- Aleksey Makarov (born 1987), Russian beach soccer player
- Alexey Makovetskiy (born 1983), Russian rugby union player
- Alexei Markov (born 1979), Russian cyclist
- Aleksey Markovsky (born 1957), Russian swimmer
- Aleksey Maslov (born 1966), Russian alpine skier
- Aleksey Matveyev (born 1970), Russian swimmer
- Aleksey Medvedev (weightlifter) (1927–2003), Soviet weightlifter
- Aleksey Medvedev (wrestler) (born 1972), Belarusian wrestler
- Aleksey Mishin (wrestler) (born 1979), Russian wrestler
- Aleksey Mishin (rower) (born 1941), Soviet rower
- Alexei Mishin (born 1941), Russian figure skating coach
- Aleksey Mochalov (born 1990), Uzbekistani canoeist
- Alexey Molchanov (born 1987), Russian free diver
- Alexey Nalobin (born 1989), Russian volleyball player
- Alexey Naumov (born 1978), Russian motorcycle racer
- Alexey Negodaylo (born 1989), Russian bobsledder
- Alexei Nemov (born 1976), Russian Olympic gymnast
- Alexey Nemtsev (born 1982), Kazakh ski orienteer
- Alexey Nesov (born 2003), Russian racing driver
- Aleksey Nikanchikov (1940–1972), Russian fencer and olympic silver medalist
- Aleksei Novoselski (born 1985), Lithuanian skier
- Aleksey Obmochaev (born 1989), Russian volleyball player
- Aleksei Oleinik (born 1997), Russian MMA fighter
- Alexei Olejnik (born 1994), Ukrainian ice dancer
- Aleksey Ostapenko (born 1986), Russian volleyball player
- Alexey Panfili (born 1974), Russo-Kazakhstani water polo player
- Alexei Papin (born 1987), Russian boxer
- Aleksey Parfenkov (born 1967), Belarusian skier
- Aleksey Pavlenko (skier) (born 1995), Russian skier
- Alexey Pchelintsev (born 1991), Kazakh ski jumper
- Aleksey Pereverzev (born 1949), Azerbaijani long jumper
- Aleksey Pershin (born 1962), Soviet race walker
- Aleksei Petrov (cyclist) (1937–2009), Russian cyclist
- Aleksey Petrov (weightlifter) (born 1974), Russian weightlifter
- Aleksey Petrukhanov (born 1972), Russian long jumper
- Alexey Petukhov (born 1983), Russian cross-country skier
- Aleksey Pluzhnikov (born 1991), Russian volleyball player
- Aleksey Pogorelov (born 1983), Kyrgyzstani-born Russian hurdler
- Alexey Poltoranin (born 1987), Kazakh cross-country skier
- Aleksei Polyakov (born 1985), Russian handball player
- Alexei Popyrin (born 1999), Australian tennis player
- Alexey Prokurorov (1964–2008), Russo-Soviet skier
- Aleksey Proshin (born 1974), Russian speed skater
- Alexei Puninski (born 1985), Russian-born Croatian swimmer
- Aleksei Pushkarev (born 1986), Russian bobsledder
- Alexei Ramírez (born 1981), Cuban baseball player
- Aleksey Rastvortsev (born 1987), Russian handball player
- Aleksey Reunkov (born 1984), Russian long-distance runner
- Alexei Rogonov (born 1988), Russian pair skater
- Alexey Romashov (born 1992), Russian ski jumper
- Alexey Rubtsov (born 1988), Russian rock climber
- Alexey Rybalkin (born 1993), Russian cyclist
- Aleksei Saks (born 1982), Estonian pair skater
- Alexey Salamini, American rower
- Alexei Sancov (born 1999), Moldovan swimmer
- Alexei Seliverstov (born 1976), Russian bobsledder
- Alexey Shaydulin (born 1979), Bulgarian boxer
- Alexey Shchebelin (born 1981), Russian cyclist
- Aleksey Shemarov (born 1982), Belarusian wrestler
- Aleksey Shevtsov (born 1979), Russian wrestler
- Aleksey Shibko (born 1977), Belarusian ski jumper
- Aleksey Shidlovsky (born 1972), Russian shot putter
- Alexey Shmider (born 1990), Kazakhstani water polo player
- Alexey Shmidt (born 1983), Russian cyclist
- Aleksey Shumakov (born 1948), Russian wrestler
- Alexey Shved (born 1988), Russian basketball player
- Alexey Sidorenko (born 1983), Kazakhstani beach volleyball player
- Aleksey Sinkevich (born 1977), Moldovan gymnast
- Alexei Sitnikov (born 1986), Russo-Azerbaijani ice dancer
- Alexei Sivakov (born 1972), Russian cyclist
- Alexey Sivokon (born 1973), Kazakhstani powerlifter
- Aleksey Skurkovskiy (born 1981), Belarusian sprint canoeist
- Alexey Smirnov (table tennis) (born 1977), Russian table tennis player
- Alexey Sobolev (born 1991), Russian snowboarder
- Aleksey Sokirskiy (born 1985), Russo-Ukrainian hammer thrower
- Aleksey Sokolov (born 1979), Russian marathon runner
- Aleksey Solodyankin (born 1972), Russian ski jumper
- Alexey Soloviev (boxer) (born 1973), Russian boxer
- Alexei Soloviev (ice dancer), Soviet ice dancer
- Aleksey Spiridonov (athlete) (1951–1998), Soviet hammer thrower
- Aleksey Spiridonov (volleyball) (born 1988), Russian volleyball player
- Alexey Stukalskiy (born 1988), Russian curler
- Aleksey Stulnev (born 1987), Russian bobsledder
- Aleksey Suvorov (born 1991), Russian speed skater
- Alexei Sviatchenko (born 1999), Russian-Hungarian pair skater
- Aleksey Svirin (born 1978), Russian rower
- Aleksey Sysoyev (born 1985), Russian decathlete
- Aleksei Tammiste (born 1946), Estonian basketball player
- Alexei Tikhonov (born 1971), Russian pair skater
- Alexey Timofeev (born 1991), Russian curler
- Aleksei Tishchenko (born 1984), Russian boxer
- Alexey Tkachev (born 1989), Russian cyclist
- Alexey Tokarev (born 1973), Russian windsurfer
- Alexei Torchinski (born 1973), Russian pair skater
- Alexei Travkin (born 1977), Russian rugby player
- Aleksey Tregubov (born 1971), Belarusian skier
- Alexey Tsatevich (1989–2024), Russian cyclist
- Alexey Tselousov (born 1975), Russian curler
- Aleksey Tsvetkov (born 1981), Russian skier
- Alexey Tyukalov (born 1978), Russian strongman
- Alexei Ulanov (born 1947), Soviet pair skater
- Aleksei Ulianov (born 1988), Russian kickboxer
- Alexei Urmanov (born 1973), Russian figure skater
- Aleksey Vakhonin (1935–1994), Soviet weightlifter and Olympic gold medalist
- Alexei Vasilevsky (figure skater) (born 1980), Russian figure skater
- Alexey Vasilyev (racing driver) (born 1972), Russian racing driver
- Alexey Vatutin (born 1992), Russian tennis player
- Aleksey Vdovin (1963–2022), Russian water polo player
- Aleksey Verbov (born 1982), Russian volleyball player
- Alexey Vermeulen (born 1994), American cyclist
- Alexey Vishnitsky (born 1981), Russian weightlifter
- Alexey Vitsenko (born 1990), Russian cross-country skier
- Alexei Volkonski (born 1978), Russian canoeist
- Alexey Volkov (biathlete) (born 1988), Russian biathlete
- Aleksey Voropayev (1973–2006), Russian gymnast and Olympic gold medalist
- Aleksei Vostrikov (born 1992), Russian sprint canoeist
- Aleksey Voyevodin (born 1970), Russian race walker
- Alexei Yagudin (born 1980), Russian figure skater
- Aleksey Yakimenko (born 1983), Russian fencer
- Alexey Yegorov (born 1975), Kazakh swimmer
- Aleksey Yemelin (born 1968), Soviet high jumper
- Aleksey Yesin (born 1987), Russian speed skater
- Aleksey Yufkin (born 1986), Russian weightlifter
- Aleksey Zagornyi (born 1978), Russian hammer thrower
- Alexey Zaitsev (born 1993), Russian bobsledder
- Alexey Zakharov (born 2000), Russian tennis player
- Aleksei Zasukhin (1937–1996), Soviet boxer
- Aleksey Zatsepin (born 1978), Russian swimmer
- Aleksei Zelensky (born 1971), Russian luger
- Aleksey Zhelonkin (born 19960, Russian long-distance runner
- Aleksey Zhigalov (1915–1963), Soviet diver
- Aleksey Zhuk (born 1955), Soviet handball player
- Alexey Zhukanenko (born 1986), Russian basketball player
- Alexey Zinovyev (born 1990), Russian swimmer
- Aleksei Zozulin (born 1983), Russian basketball player

=== Association football ===
- Aleksey Abramov (born 1988), Russian footballer
- Aleksei Alekseyev (born 1988), Russian footballer
- Aleksei Alemanov (born 1977), Russian footballer
- Aleksei Alyakrinsky (born 1976), Russian footballer
- Aleksey Antilevsky (born 2002), Belarusian footballer
- Aleksei Antonnikov (born 1983), Russian footballer
- Aleksey Antonyuk (born 1984), Russian football player and coach
- Aleksei Aravin (born 1986), Russian footballer
- Aleksei Arefyev (born 1971), Russian footballer
- Aleksey Arifullin (1970−2017), Russian footballer
- Aleksei Arkhangelsky (born 1986), Russian footballer
- Aleksey Arkhipov (born 1983), Russian footballer
- Aleksei Artyomov (born 1983), Russian footballer
- Aleksey Averyanov (born 1986), Russian footballer
- Aleksei Babenko (born 1972), Russian footballer
- Aleksey Baga (born 1981), Russian football player and manager
- Aleksei Bakharev (1976–2022), Russo-Ukrainian footballer
- Alexey Bakunin (born 1970), Russian footballer
- Aleksei Baranov (footballer) (born 1980), Russian footballer
- Aleksey Baranovsky (born 2005), Russian footballer
- Aleksey Batrakov (born 2005), Russian footballer
- Aleksei Bayev (born 1993), Russian footballer
- Aleksei Bazanov (born 1986), Russian footballer
- Aleksei Belenkov (born 1957), Russian football coach and player
- Aleksey Belevich (born 1995), Belarusian footballer
- Aleksei Belkin (born 1981), Russian footballer
- Aleksei Berdnikov (born 1996), Russian footballer
- Aleksei Berezin (born 1993), Russian footballer
- Aleksei Berezutski (born 1982), Russian football coach and player
- Aleksei Bobrov (footballer, born 1972), Russian footballer
- Aleksei Bobrov (footballer, born 1973), Russian footballer
- Aleksei Bolshakov (born 1966), Russian footballer
- Aleksei Bondarev (born 1987), Russian footballer
- Aleksei Botvinyev (born 1981), Russian football coach and player
- Aleksei Brikov (born 1978), Russian footballer
- Aleksei Bugayev (1981–2024), Russian footballer and veteran
- Aleksey Butarevich (born 1997), Belarusian footballer
- Aleksei Buznyakov (born 1985), Russian footballer
- Aleksei Bychkov (born 1972), Russian footballer
- Alexei Casian (born 1987), Moldovan footballer
- Aleksei Chernov (footballer, born 1974), Russian footballer
- Aleksey Chernov (footballer) (born 1998), Russian football goalkeeper
- Alexey Chesmin (born 1986), Russian paralympic footballer
- Aleksei Chizhikov (born 1969), Russian footballer
- Aleksei Churavtsev (born 1984), Russian footballer
- Aleksey Dionisiev (born 1973), Bulgarian-born Uzbekistani footballer
- Alexéi Domínguez (born 2005), Mexican footballer
- Aleksei Domshinskiy (born 1990), Russian footballer
- Aleksey Dovgel (born 1994), Belarusian footballer
- Aleksei Druzin (born 1987), Russian footballer
- Aleksei Dudin (born 1977), Russian footballer
- Alexei Eremenko (born 1983), Russo-Finnish footballer
- Aleksei Eskov (referee) (born 1978), Russian football referee
- Aleksei Filippov (footballer, born 1973), Russian footballer
- Aleksei Filippov (footballer, born 1975), Russian footballer
- Aleksei Foroponov (born 1987), Russian footballer
- Aleksei Gasilin (born 1996), Russian footballer
- Aleksei Gerasimenko (born 1970), Russian football coach and player
- Aleksei Gerasimov (footballer, born 1973) (born 1973), Russian footballer
- Aleksei Gerasimov (footballer, born 1999), Russian footballer
- Aleksei Germashov (born 1982), Russian football coach and player
- Aleksei Gladyshev (born 1992), Russian footballer
- Aleksei Golovin (footballer) (born 1981), Russian footballer
- Alexei Goncearov (born 1984), Moldovan footballer
- Aleksei Goncharov (footballer) (born 1988), Russian footballer
- Aleksei Gorelkin (born 1983), Russian footballer
- Aleksei Gorodovoy (born 1993), Russian footballer
- Aleksei Goryushkin (born 1988), Russian footballer
- Aleksei Grechkin (born 1996), Russian footballer
- Aleksei Gridnev (born 1977), Russian footballer
- Aleksey Grinin (1919–1988), Soviet footballer and coach
- Aleksei Gritsayenko (born 1995), Russian footballer
- Aleksei Gubochkin (born 1999), Russian footballer
- Aleksei Gudkov (born 1972), Russian footballer
- Aleksei Gulo (born 1973), Russian footballer
- Aleksei Guschin (born 1971), Russian footballer
- Aleksei Igonin (born 1976), Russian footballer
- Aleksei Ilatovskiy (born 1975), Russian footballer
- Aleksei Ilyin (footballer, born 1958), Russian football coach and player
- Aleksei Ilyin (footballer, born 1978), Russian footballer
- Aleksei Ionov (born 1989), Russian footballer
- Aleksey Isayev (born 1995), Azerbaijani footballer
- Aleksei Ivakhov (born 1976), Russian football manager and player
- Aleksei Ivanov (footballer, born 1981) (born 1981), Russian footballer
- Aleksei Ivanushkin (born 1996), Russian footballer
- Aleksey Jdanov (born 1976), Uzbekistani footballer
- Aleksei Kalashnik (born 1983), Russian footballer
- Aleksei Kandalintsev (born 1976), Russian footballer
- Aleksei Kangaskolkka (born 1988), Russo-Finnish footballer
- Aleksei Karakosov (1890–1917), Russian footballer killed in WWI
- Aleksei Kashtanov (born 1996), Russian footballer
- Aleksei Katulsky (born 1977), Russian footballer
- Aleksei Kazalov (born 1967), Russian football player and coach
- Aleksei Kenyaykin (born 1998), Russian footballer
- Aleksey Kharitonovich (born 1995), Belarusian footballer
- Aleksey Khodnevich (born 1987), Belarusian footballer
- Alexei Khomich (1920–1980), Soviet footballer
- Aleksei Khrapov (born 1979), Russian footballer
- Aleksei Khrushchyov (born 1992), Russian footballer
- Aleksei Klestov (born 1974), Russian footballer
- Alexei Klishin (born 1973), Kazakh footballer
- Aleksei Kocharygin (born 1976), Russian footballer
- Aleksei Kolomiychenko (born 1982), Russian footballer
- Aleksey Koltakov (born 2005), Russian footballer
- Aleksei Kontsedalov (born 1990), Russian footballer
- Aleksei Korbut (born 1981), Russian footballer
- Alexey Korneyev (born 1939–2004), Soviet footballer
- Aleksey Kornienko (born 2003), Russian football defender
- Alexei Koșelev (born 1993), Moldovan footballer
- Aleksei Kosolapov (born 1971), Russo-Kazakh football player and coach
- Aleksei Kosonogov (born 1982), Russian footballer
- Aleksei Kostenko (born 1984), Russian footballer
- Aleksei Kostylev (1914–1989), Soviet footballer
- Aleksei Kotlyarov (born 1989), Soviet footballer
- Aleksey Korol (born 1977), Ukrainian footballer
- Alexei Kovalev (referee) (born 1973), Russian football referee
- Aleksei Kozlov (footballer, born 1975), Russian footballer
- Aleksei Kozlov (footballer, born 1999), Russian footballer
- Aleksei Kozlov (footballer, born 1986), Russian footballer
- Aleksei Krasnokutskiy (born 1986), Russian football coach and player
- Aleksei Kurzenyov (born 1995), Russian footballer
- Aleksei Kutsenko (born 1972), Russian footballer
- Aleksei Kutsero (born 1997), Russian footballer
- Aleksei Kuvshinov (born 1992), Russian footballer
- Aleksey Kuznetsov (footballer) (born 1996), Russian footballer
- Aleksei Latushkin (born 1972), Russian footballer
- Aleksey Lavrik (born 2000), Belarusian footballer
- Aleksei Lazarev (born 1981), Russian footballer
- Aleksey Legchilin (born 1992), Belarusian footballer
- Aleksei Leonov (footballer) (born 1977), Russian footballer
- Aleksei Lipatnikov (born 1964), Russian football coach and player
- Aleksei Lopatin (born 1985), Russian footballer
- Aleksey Lysov (footballer) (born 2005), Russian footballer
- Aleksei Lyubushkin (born 1990), Russian footballer
- Aleksei Makushkin (born 1997), Russian footballer
- Aleksei Mamin (born 1999), Russian footballer
- Aleksei Mamonov (born 1993), Russian footballer
- Aleksei Mamykin (1936–2011), Soviet footballer
- Aleksei Martynov (born 1978), Russian footballer
- Aleksei Matyunin (born 1982), Russian football referee
- Aleksei Medvedev (footballer) (born 1977), Russian footballer and coach
- Aleksei Melyoshin (born 1976), Russian football player and coach
- Aleksey Mikhalyov (footballer) (born 1983), Russian football player and official
- Aleksei Mikheyev (footballer) (born 1998), Russian footballer
- Aleksei Miranchuk (born 1995), Russian footballer
- Aleksei Mironov (born 2000), Russian footballer
- Aleksei Mitin (born 1973), Russian footballer
- Aleksei Morochko (born 1972), Russian footballer
- Aleksey Morozov (footballer) (born 1966), Russian football coach
- Aleksey Muldarov (born 1984), Kazakh footballer
- Aleksei Musatov (1980–2005), Russian footballer
- Aleksey Naumov (footballer) (born 1972), Russian footballer
- Aleksey Negmatov (born 1986), Tajik footballer
- Aleksei Nikitenkov (born 2001), Russian footballer
- Aleksei Nikitin (born 1992), Russian footballer
- Aleksei Nikolaev (referee) (born 1971), Russian football referee
- Aleksey Nikolaev (footballer, born 1979), Russian-Uzbekistani footballer
- Aleksei Nikolayev (footballer, born 1985), Russian footballer
- Aleksey Nosko (born 1996), Belarusian footballer
- Aleksei Orlov (footballer) (born 1997), Russian footballer
- Aleksey Orlovich (born 2002), Belarusian footballer
- Aleksei Ostayev (born 1973), Russian footballer
- Aleksei Panin (footballer) (born 1979), Russian footballer
- Aleksei Paramonov (1925–2018), Russian footballer
- Aleksei Pavlishin (born 1995), Russian footballer
- Aleksei Peplov (born 1977), Russian footballer
- Aleksei Perminov (born 1968), Russian footballer
- Aleksei Petrushin (born 1952), Russian footballer
- Aleksey Plotnikov (born 1998), Russian footballer
- Aleksei Poddubskiy (born 1972), Russian football manager and player
- Aleksei Podprugin (born 1988), Russian footballer
- Aleksey Polyakov (born 1974), Uzbek footballer
- Aleksei Pomerko (born 1990), Russian footballer
- Aleksei Popov (footballer, born 1978), Russian footballer
- Aleksei Popov (footballer, born 1990), Russian footballer
- Aleksei Prokudin (born 1982), Russian footballer
- Aleksei Prudnikov (born 19600, Russian football goalkeeper
- Aleksei Puchkov (born 1982), Russian footballer
- Aleksei Pugin (born 1987), Russian footballer
- Aleksey Pustozyorov (born 1988), Russian footballer
- Aleksei Rebko (born 1986), Russian football player and coach
- Aleksei Revyakin (born 1982), Russian footballer
- Aleksey Rios (born 1987), Belarusian footballer
- Aleksey Rodionov (born 1994), Kazakhstani footballer
- Aleksey Rogov (footballer) (born 1991), Russian football player
- Alexéi Rojas (born 2005), English-born Russian-Colombian footballer
- Aleksei Rogachyov (born 1979), Russian footballer
- Aleksey Rudenok (born 1993), Belarusian footballer
- Aleksei Ryazanov (born 1975), Russian footballer
- Aleksey Rybin (born 1988), Russian footballer
- Aleksei Samylin (born 1997), Russian footballer
- Aleksei Sapayev (born 1983), Russian footballer
- Aleksei Sapogov (born 1988), Russian footballer
- Aleksei Savchenko (born 1975), Russian footballer
- Aleksei Savelyev (born 1977), Russian footballer
- Alexei Savinov (born 1979), Moldovan football manager and player
- Aleksey Savrasenko (born 1979), Russian-Greek footballer
- Aleksei Sazonov (born 1992), Russian footballer
- Alexei Scala (born 1965), Moldovan footballer
- Aleksei Selezov (born 1971), Russian footballer
- Aleksei Selin (born 1978), Russian footballer
- Alexey Semyonov (footballer, born 1949), Russian footballer
- Aleksei Semyonov (footballer, born 1983), Russian footballer
- Aleksey Semyonov (Uzbekistani footballer), Uzbekistani footballer
- Aleksei Serebryakov (footballer) (born 1976), Russian footballer
- Alexey Sereda (born 1966), Russian football player and coach
- Aleksei Sergeyev (footballer) (born 1979), Russian footballer
- Aleksey Shalashnikov (born 2002), Belarusian footballer
- Aleksei Shaposhnikov (footballer) (1899–1962), Soviet footballer
- Aleksey Shchigolev (born 1972), Russian footballer
- Aleksey Shchyotkin (born 1991), Kazakhstani footballer
- Alexey Shebanov (born 1993), Russian footballer
- Aleksei Shelyakov (born 1995), Russian footballer
- Aleksei Shemetov (born 1973), Russian footballer
- Aleksei Sherstnyov (born 1975), Russian football coach and player
- Aleksei Shiyanov (born 1973), Russian football official
- Aleksei Shlyapkin (born 1987), Russian footballer
- Aleksey Shpilevsky (born 1988), Belarusian football manager
- Aleksei Shulgin (footballer) (born 1997), Russian footballer
- Aleksei Shumskikh (born 1990), Russian footballer
- Aleksey Skvernyuk (born 1985), Belarusian footballer
- Aleksei Skornyakov (born 1993), Russian footballer
- Alexey Smertin (born 1975), Russian football official
- Aleksei Smetanin (born 1981), Russian footballer
- Aleksei Smirnov (footballer) (born 1994), Russian football player
- Aleksei Snigiryov (born 1968), Russian footballer
- Aleksei Sobolev (footballer) (1968–2001), Russian footballer
- Aleksei Solosin (born 1987), Russian football goalkeeper
- Aleksei Solovyov (footballer) (born 1996), Russian footballer
- Alexey Sorokin (football administrator) (born 1972), Russian football administrator
- Alexey Spirin (1952–2024), Russian football referee
- Aleksei Stepanov (born 1977), Russian footballer
- Alexey Stepanov (1960–2002), Russian footballer
- Aleksei Stukalov (born 1983), Russian football coach
- Aleksei Sudarikov (born 1971), Russian footballer
- Aleksei Sugak (born 1990), Russian footballer
- Aleksei Sukharev (born 1993), Russian footballer
- Aleksei Sutormin (born 1994), Russian footballer
- Aleksey Sychkov (born 1992), Belarusian footballer
- Aleksei Syropyatov (born 1981), Russian footballer
- Aleksey Tarakanov (born 1996), Belarusian footballer
- Aleksei Tatayev (born 1998), Russian footballer
- Aleksey Teslyuk (born 1994), Belarusian footballer
- Aleksei Tikhonkikh (footballer) (born 1977), Russian footballer
- Aleksei Tretyakov (born 2001), Russian footballer
- Aleksei Trinitatskiy (born 1985), Russian footballer
- Aleksei Triputen (born 1982), Russian footballer
- Aleksei Troitsky (footballer) (1894–1958), Russian footballer
- Aleksey Tumakov (born 1983), Russian paralympic footballer
- Aleksei Turik (born 1995), Russian footballer
- Aleksei Tyurgashkin (born 1981), Russian footballer
- Aleksei Usanov (born 2001), Russian footballer
- Aleksei Uvarov (footballer) (born 1981), Russian footballer
- Aleksei Uversky (1886–1942), Russian footballer
- Aleksei Vanyushin (born 1982), Russian footballer
- Aleksei Vasilyev (footballer) (born 1987), Russian footballer
- Aleksey Vergeyenko (born 1975), Belarusian football coach and player
- Aleksei Vereshchak (born 1976), Russian footballer
- Aleksei Vershinin (born 1979), Russian footballer
- Aleksey Vodyagin (1925–1991), Russian football player and coach
- Aleksey Vakulich (born 1998), Belarusian footballer
- Aleksei Volovik (born 1992), Russian footballer
- Aleksei Yedunov (born 1986), Russian football coach
- Aleksei Yepifanov (born 1983), Russian footballer
- Aleksei Yeroshkin (born 1987), Russian footballer
- Aleksei Yeryomenko (born 1964), Russian footballer
- Aleksei Yeskov (1946–2002), Russian football player and coach
- Aleksey Yevseyev (born 1994), Russian footballer
- Aleksei Yudkin (born 1981), Russian footballer
- Aleksei Yurishchev (born 1978), Russian footballer
- Aleksei Yushchuk (born 1987), Russian footballer
- Aleksei Yushkov (1967–1996), Russian footballer
- Aleksey Zalesky (born 1994), Belarusian footballer
- Aleksei Zhdanov (born 1982), Russian footballer
- Aleksei Zhitnikov (born 1984), Russian footballer
- Aleksey Zhukov (born 1965), Russian football coach and player
- Aleksey Zhuravlyov (footballer) (born 1980), Russian footballer
- Aleksei Zlydnev (born 1980), Russian footballer
- Aleksei Zolotarenko (born 1993), Russian footballer
- Alexei Zuáznabar (born 1985), Cuban footballer
- Aleksei Zuev (born 1981), Russian footballer

=== Hockey ===
- Alexei Akifiev (born 1976), Russian ice hockey player
- Alexey Amosov (born 1981), Russian sledge hockey player
- Alexei Anisimov (ice hockey) (born 1984), Russian ice hockey goaltender
- Alexei Antsiferov (born 1991), Russo-Kazakh ice hockey player
- Alexei Badyukov (born 1978), Russian ice hockey center
- Alexei Belov (born 1986), Russian ice hockey goalie
- Alexei Bereglazov (born 1994), Russian ice hockey player
- Alexei Bondarev (born 1983), Russian ice hockey player
- Alexei Bulatov (born 1978), Russian ice hockey player
- Alexei Cherepanov (1989–2008), Russian ice hockey player
- Alexei Chistyakov (born 1968), Russian ice hockey player
- Alexei Chupin (born 1972), Russian ice hockey player
- Alexey Dmitriev (born 1985), Belarusian-born German hockey player
- Alexei Emelin (born 1986), Russian ice hockey player
- Alexei Filippov (ice hockey, born 1989), Russian ice hockey player
- Alexei Filippov (ice hockey, born 1994), Russian ice hockey player
- Aleksei Frolikov (1957–2020), Latvian ice hockey player
- Alexei Glukhov (born 1984), Russian ice hockey player
- Alexei Grishin (ice hockey) (born 1988), Russian ice hockey player
- Alexei Guryshev (1925–1983), Soviet ice hockey player
- Alexei Gusarov (born 1964), Russian ice hockey player
- Alexei Ishmametyev (born 1988), Russian ice hockey player
- Alexei Ivanov (ice hockey, born 1985), Russian ice hockey player
- Alexei Ivanov (ice hockey, born 1988), Kazakhstani ice hockey player
- Alexei Kaigorodov (born 1983), Russian ice hockey player
- Alexei Kalyuzhny (born 1977), Belarusian ice hockey player
- Alexei Kasatonov (born 1959), Russian ice hockey player
- Alexei Kolkunov (born 1977), Russian ice hockey player
- Alexei Koledayev (born 1976), Russian ice hockey player
- Aleksei Kolosov (born 2002), Russian ice hockey player
- Alexei Komarov (born 1978), Russian ice hockey player
- Alexei Kopeikin (born 1983), Russian ice hockey player
- Alexei Kosourov (born 1979), Russian ice hockey player
- Alexei Kovalev (born 1973), Russian ice hockey player
- Alexei Koznev (born 1975), Russian ice hockey player
- Alexei Krivchenkov (born 1974), Russian ice hockey player
- Alexei Kruchinin (born 1991), Russian ice hockey player
- Alexei Krutov (born 1984), Russian ice hockey player
- Alexei Kudashov (born 1971), Russian ice hockey player
- Aleksey Igorevich Kuznetsov (born 1983), Kazakh ice hockey player
- Alexei Litvinenko (born 1980), Russian ice hockey defenceman
- Aleksey Lozhkin (born 1974), Belarusian ice hockey player
- Aleksei Lysov (sledge hockey) (born 1976), Russian sledge hockey player
- Alexei Makeyev (born 1991), Russian ice hockey player
- Alexei Maklyukov (born 1993), Russian ice hockey player
- Alexey Marchenko (born 1992), Russian ice hockey player
- Alexei Mastryukov (born 1992), Russian ice hockey player
- Alexei Medvedev (ice hockey) (born 1982), Russian ice hockey player
- Alexei Medvedev (ice hockey, born 2007), Russian ice hockey player
- Alexei Melnichuk (born 1998), Russian ice hockey player
- Alexei Mikhnov (born 1982), Russian-Ukrainian ice hockey player
- Alexei Mitrofanov (ice hockey) (born 1994), Russian ice hockey player
- Alexei Morozov (born 1977), Russian ice hockey player
- Alexei Murygin (1986–2026), Russian ice hockey player
- Aleksey Nikiforov (born 1957), Lithuanian ice hockey coach and player
- Alexei Pepelyayev (born 1984), Russian ice hockey player
- Alexei Petrov (ice hockey) (born 1983), Russian ice hockey player
- Alexei Ponikarovsky (born 1980), Ukrainian-Canadian ice hockey player
- Alexei Potapov (born 1989), Russian ice hockey player
- Alexei Savin (1986–2007), Russian-born Belarusian ice hockey player
- Alexei Semenov (ice hockey) (born 1951), Russian ice hockey defenceman
- Alexei Semyonov (ice hockey) (born 1986), Russian ice hockey player
- Aleksei Shkotov (born 1984), Russian ice hockey player
- Aleksei Shvalev (born 1987), Russian ice hockey player
- Alexei Simakov (born 1979), Russian ice hockey player
- Alexei Smirnov (ice hockey) (born 1982), Russian ice hockey player
- Alexei Sopin (born 1987), Russian ice hockey player
- Alexei Strakhov (born 1975), Ukrainian ice hockey player
- Alexei Tereshchenko (born 1980), Russian ice hockey player
- Alexei Tertyshny (born 1977), Russian ice hockey coach and player
- Alexei Tezikov (1978–2020), Russian ice hockey player
- Alexey Toropchenko (born 1999), Russian ice hockey player
- Alexei Troschinsky (born 1973), Kazakh ice hockey player
- Alexei Tsvetkov (ice hockey) (born 1981), Russian ice hockey player
- Alexei Ugarov, Belarusian ice hockey player
- Alexei Vasilchenko (born 1981), Kazakh ice hockey player
- Alexei Vasilevsky (ice hockey, born 1993), Russian ice hockey player
- Aleksei Vasiliev (ice hockey, born 1984), Russian ice hockey player
- Alexei Vasiliev (ice hockey, born 1977), Russian ice hockey player
- Aleksey Volchenkov (1953–2011), Russian ice hockey player
- Aleksei Volkov (ice hockey) (born 1980), Russian ice hockey player
- Alexei Voronov (born 1977), Russian ice hockey player
- Alexei Vorontsov (born 1986), Kazakhstani ice hockey player
- Alexei Yakhin (born 1984), Russian ice hockey player
- Alexei Yashin (born 1973), Russian ice hockey player
- Alexei Yefimenko (born 1985), Belarusian ice hockey player
- Alexei Yefimov (born 1988), Russian ice hockey player
- Alexei Yegorov (ice hockey, born 1975), Russian ice hockey player
- Alexei Yegorov (ice hockey, born 1976), Russian ice hockey player
- Alexei Zavarukhin (born 1980), Russian ice hockey player
- Alexei Zhamnov (born 1970), Russian ice hockey player
- Alexei Zhitnik (born 1972), Russo-Ukrainian ice hockey player

== Miscellaneous ==
- Alexei Abrikosov (confectioner) (1824–1904), Russian confectioner
- Alexei Stanislavovich Avtonomov (born 1959), Russian legal scholar
- Alexei Bogaturov (born 1954), Russian international relations scholar
- Aleksei Chirikov (1703–1748), Russian explorer
- Aleksey Durnovo (1792–1841), Russian squire and landlord
- Alexei Fedchenko (1844–1873), Russian explorer
- Alexey Pajitnov (born 1955), inventor of the popular puzzle game Tetris
- Aleksey Sofronov (1859–1925), close friend of Pyotr Tchaikovsky
- Alexei Stakhanov (1906–1977), Soviet miner
- Alexey Tryoshnikov (1914–1991), Soviet polar explorer

== Fictional characters ==
- Alyosha Karamazov, in Fyodor Dostoyevsky's The Brothers Karamazov
- Alexey Sitsevich, in the Marvel universe

== Folklore ==
- Alyoshenka, a mummified body found in the village of Kaolinovy, Russia, famously rumored to be an alien

== See also ==
- Aleksi
- Alexi
- Alexie
- Alexeyev, a surname derived from the name
- Alexeyevka, a common Russian place name
- Alexeyevsky, a common Russian place name
- Alexey W. Von Schmidt, Historical landmak in California
