= Aleksievich =

Aleksiyevich (also Alexievich and other variants, Алексие́вич, Belarusian: Алексіевіч Ukrainian: Алексієвич) is an East Slavic family name derived from the Old East Slavic given name Aleksiy (modern Alexey). It should not be confused with the patronymic of the same spelling; the difference is in the stress: the surname has the penultimate stress (i.e., on the second last syllable), while the patronymic inherits the stress of the given name, i.e., on the second syllable: Але́ексиевич.

The surname may refer to

- Svetlana Alexievich (born 1948), Belarusian Nobel award-winning writer
- Illya Aleksiyevich (born 1991), Belarusian footballer
