= Aleksei Kostenko =

Russian footballer

Alexey Kostenko
Personal information
- Full name: Alexey Igorevich Kostenko
- Date of birth: 19 November 1984 (age 41)
- Place of birth: Moscow, Soviet Union
- Height: 1.74 m (5 ft 9 in)
- Position: Midfielder

Senior career*
Years	Team	Apps	(Gls)
2002	Spartak Moscow	0	(0)
2003–2004	Dinaburg Daugavpils	25	(1)
2005	Metallurg Lipetsk	3	(0)
2005–2007	Dinaburg Daugavpils	25	(1)
2007	Spartak Nalchik (loan)	1	(0)
2008	→ SKA Rostov-on-Don (loan)	34	(3)
2009	→ FC Astrakhan (loan)	18	(0)
2009	→ FC Tyumen (loan)	9	(0)

International career
2004	Russia U-21	4	(0)
- * Club domestic league appearances and goals

Alexey Igorevich Kostenko (Russian: Алексей Игоревич Костенко; born 19 November 1984) is a Russian former footballer.

== Club career ==
Kostenko previously played for FC Spartak Nalchik in the Russian Premier League and SKA Rostov-on-Don in the Russian First Division.

== Playing career ==
2002	FC Spartak Moscow	Russian Premier League 1st level	*
2003	Dinaburg Daugavpils	Latvian Higher League 1st level
2004	Dinaburg Daugavpils	Latvian Higher League 1st level	25/1
2005	FC Metallurg Lipetsk	Russian First Division 2nd level	3/0
2005	Dinaburg Daugavpils	Latvian Higher League 1st level	2/0
2006	Dinaburg Daugavpils	Latvian Higher League 1st level	23/1
2007	Dinaburg Daugavpils	Latvian Higher League 1st level
2007	PFC Spartak Nalchik	Russian Premier League 1st level	1/0

* - played games and goals
