= Aleksei Relke =

Ukrainian military commander

Aleksei Relke is a commander of the pro-Russian militant group Army of the South-East.

Along with Valery Bolotov, he participated in attack on the SBU headquarters in Luhansk on April 6, 2014. Relke was detained by local SBU on April 5, 2014. However, during the attack on SBU headquarters the chief of militsiya in Luhansk Oblast Volodymyr Huslavsky requested the chief of SBU to sign a release for Relke.
