= Aleksei Foroponov =

Russian footballer

Personal information
- Full name: Aleksei Alekseyevich Foroponov
- Date of birth: 4 March 1987 (age 39)
- Place of birth: Kursk, Russian SFSR
- Height: 1.76 m (5 ft 9 1/2 in)
- Position: Defender

Senior career*
Years	Team	Apps	(Gls)
2007	FC Avangard-2 Kursk		
2008–2017	FC Avangard Kursk	180	(2)
- * Club domestic league appearances and goals

Aleksei Alekseyevich Foroponov (Russian: Алексей Алексеевич Форопонов; born 4 March 1987) is a former Russian professional football player.

== Club career ==
He played 2 seasons in the Russian Football National League for FC Avangard Kursk.
