= Alexey Zlobin =

Russian politician (1935–2025)

- Алексей Злобин

Member of the Congress of People's Deputies of Russia
- In office 16 May 1990 – 21 September 1993

Personal details
- Born: Alexey Andreevich Zlobin; 21 March 1935; Stalinsk, Novosibirsk Oblast, Russian SFSR, USSR
- Died: 16 January 2025 (aged 89)
- Education: Moscow Theological Academy
- Occupation: Priest

Alexey Andreevich Zlobin (Russian: Алексей Андреевич Злобин; 21 March 1935 – 16 January 2025) was a Russian politician. He served in the Congress of People's Deputies of Russia from 1990 to 1993.

Zlobin died on 16 January 2025, at the age of 89.
