= Aleksei Gorelkin =

Russian footballer

Personal information
- Full name: Aleksei Viktorovich Gorelkin
- Date of birth: 8 November 1983 (age 43)
- Place of birth: Chelyabinsk, Russian SFSR
- Height: 1.80 m (5 ft 11 in)
- Position: Midfielder

Senior career*
Years	Team	Apps	(Gls)
2002–2005	FC Zenit Chelyabinsk	90	(2)
2006–2007	FC Nosta Novotroitsk	15	(0)
2008	FC SOYUZ-Gazprom Izhevsk	23	(0)
2009	FC Kyzylzhar	14	(0)
2009–2013	FC Chelyabinsk	86	(3)
2013–2014	FC Nosta Novotroitsk	19	(0)
- * Club domestic league appearances and goals

Aleksei Viktorovich Gorelkin (Russian: Алексей Викторович Горелкин; born 8 November 1983) is a Russian former professional footballer.

== Club career ==
He played in the Russian Football National League for FC Nosta Novotroitsk in 2007.
