= Aleksei Kutsero =

Russian footballer

Personal information
- Full name: Aleksei Aleksandrovich Kutsero
- Date of birth: 20 March 1997 (age 29)
- Height: 1.86 m (6 ft 1 in)
- Position: Midfielder

Senior career*
Years	Team	Apps	(Gls)
2015–2016	FC Baltika Kaliningrad	4	(0)
- * Club domestic league appearances and goals

Aleksei Aleksandrovich Kutsero (Russian: Алексей Александрович Куцеро; born 20 March 1997) is a Russian former football player.

He made his debut in the Russian Football National League for FC Baltika Kaliningrad on 11 October 2015 in a game against FC Zenit-2 Saint Petersburg.
