= Alexey Vladimir Bobrov =

Russian botanist

- Born: 1969 (age 56–57); Russia
- Scientific career
- Fields: botanist, explorer
- Institutions: Moscow State University
- Author abbrev. (botany): A.V.Bobrov

Alexey Vladimir F. Ch. Bobrov (Russian: Алексей Владимирович Ф. Ч. Бобров; born 1969) is a Russian botanist and explorer. He is a researcher at the Faculty of Geography of the Moscow State University.
