= Aleksei Chizhikov =

Russian footballer

Personal information
- Full name: Aleksei Viktorovich Chizhikov
- Date of birth: 26 February 1969 (age 57)
- Place of birth: Moscow, Russian SFSR
- Height: 1.80 m (5 ft 11 in)
- Positions: Defender; midfielder

Youth career
- EShVSM Moscow

Senior career*
Years	Team	Apps	(Gls)
1987	EShVSM Moscow	8	(2)
1988–1989	FC Dynamo-2 Moscow	65	(2)
1990	FC Dinamo Sukhumi	1	(0)
1990–1991	FC Dynamo-2 Moscow	25	(0)
1991	FC Prometey Lyubertsy	21	(4)
1992	FC Dynamo-Gazovik Tyumen	14	(0)
1993	FC TRASKO Moscow	22	(4)
- * Club domestic league appearances and goals

Aleksei Viktorovich Chizhikov (Russian: Алексей Викторович Чижиков; born 26 February 1969 in Moscow) is a former Russian football player.

Chizhikov played in the Russian Top League with FC Dynamo-Gazovik Tyumen.
