= Alexey Mikhailovich Sokolov =

- Алексей Михайлович Соколов
- Born: November 19, 1972 (age 53); Leningrad, USSR
- Education: St. Petersburg State Transport University
- Scientific career
- Thesis: Methodology for Synthesizing Fuzzy Strength Models for Improving Connections of Car Structural Elements (2006)

Alexey Sokolov (Russian: Алексей Михайлович Соколов, born November 19, 1972, Leningrad) is a leading scientist in railcar building and heavy haul railway technologies in the Commonwealth of Independent States. He received a degree of the St. Petersburg State Transport University. Alexey Sokolov holds scientific degree of PhD and Sc.D. in Technical Sciences.

== Publications ==
- VNIIZHT Bulletin (Railway Research Institute Bulletin), #1, 2012. Industry-wide technology platform high-productivity freight rolling stock as a tool for better utilization of railway carrying capacity reserves. B.M. Lapidus, A.M. Sokolov.
- VNIIZHT Bulletin (Railway Research Institute Bulletin), #1, 2015. Development of techniques to analyse technogenic hazards and risks related to railway assets. Makhutov Nikolai A., Gadenin Mikhail M., Sokolov Alexey M., Titov Evgeniy Yu.
- The fuzzy durability model synthesis method for improving the joints of rolling stock elements, 2006. A. M. Sokolov; St. Petersburg State Transport University.
- International Heavy Haul Association Conference, South Africa, 2017. Orlova A., Savushkin R., Sokolov A., Dmitriev S., Rudakova E., Krivchenkov A., Kudryavtsev M., Fedorova V. Development and testing of freight wagons for 27 t per axle loads for 1520 mm gauge railways. ISBN 978-0-911-382-66-2 // - P. 1089–1096.
