= Aleksei Sobolev (footballer) =

Russian footballer (1968–2001)

Personal information
- Full name: Aleksei Valeryevich Sobolev
- Date of birth: 16 January 1968
- Date of death: 15 November 2001 (aged 33)
- Height: 1.78 m (5 ft 10 in)
- Position: Defender

Senior career*
Years	Team	Apps	(Gls)
1984–1985	FC Dnipro	0	(0)
1985–1986	Shakhtar Pavlohrad	13	(0)
1988–1993	Okean Nakhodka	171	(4)
1993	→ Okean-d Nakhodka (loan)	1	(0)
1994–1997	Luch Vladivostok	94	(1)
- * Club domestic league appearances and goals

Aleksei Valeryevich Sobolev (Russian: Алексей Валерьевич Соболев; 16 January 1968 – 15 November 2001) was a Russian footballer who played as a defender.
