= Aleksey Dovgel =

Belarusian footballer

Personal information
- Date of birth: 28 July 1994 (age 32)
- Place of birth: Minsk, Belarus
- Height: 1.77 m (5 ft 9 1/2 in)
- Position: Midfielder

Youth career
- 2010–2014: BATE Borisov

Senior career*
Years	Team	Apps	(Gls)
2015	BATE Borisov	0	(0)
2015	→ Isloch Minsk Raion (loan)	26	(0)
2016	Isloch Minsk Raion	1	(0)
2016–2017	Torpedo Minsk	13	(0)
2018	Chist	3	(0)
2022	Yuni Minsk	2	(0)

International career
2013	Belarus U21	6	(0)
- * Club domestic league appearances and goals as of 31 December 2022

Aleksey Dovgel (Belarusian: Аляксей Доўгель; Russian: Алексей Довгель; born 28 July 1994) is a Belarusian former professional footballer.
