= Alexey Gorgidze =

Georgian mathematician (1907–1992)

- ალექსი გორგიძე
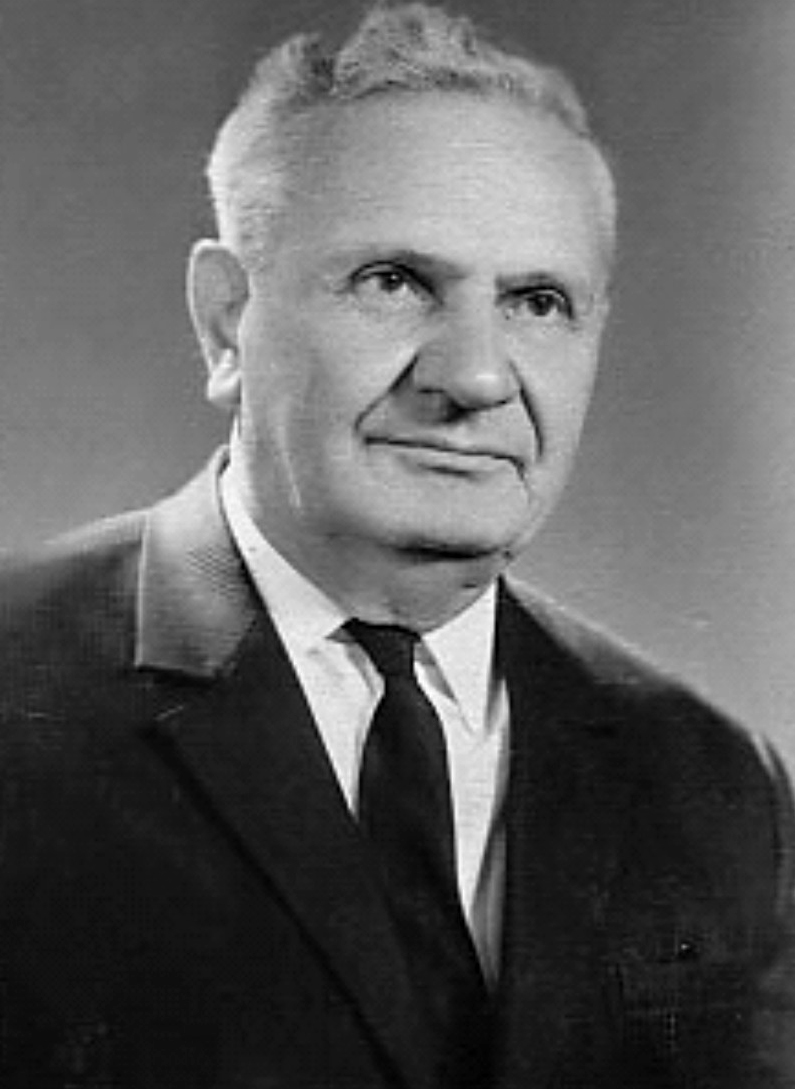
- Born: 17 May 1907; Kutaisi, Georgia, Russian Empire
- Died: 17 December 1992 (aged 85); Tbilisi, Georgia
- Education: Tbilisi State University
- Known for: Numerical solution of plane problems in the theory of elasticity.
- Scientific career
- Fields: theoratical mathematics.
- Workplaces: Tbilisi State University; Department of Theoretical Mechanics of the Polytechnic Institute; Georgian Academy of Sciences.

Alexey Yasonovich Gorgidze (Georgian: ალექსი გორგიძე; 17 May 1907 – 17 December 1992) was the Soviet and Georgian mathematician and engineer, Laureate of the State Prize of Georgia 1998, Honored Scientist, and Professor.

== Biography ==
He was born on 17 May 1907 in Kutaisi. In 1924 he graduated from the Socio-Humanitarian College, and entered the Physics and Mathematics Department of the Tbilisi State University. Since 1929 he has started working at Department of Theoretical Mechanics of the Georgian Technical University. In 1932 he continued studying in Leningrad State University and finished it in 1935. After returning he worked at Georgian Technical University, at Tbilisi State University, and Institute of Mathematics of the Georgian National Academy of Sciences. He was actively involved in organizing and creating the Institute of Mathematics. In 1935–1954 he worked at Andrea Razmadze Mathematical Institute under Georgian National Academy of Sciences (as a senior researcher, scientific secretary, deputy director of the institute). In 1938 he was elected to the post of Head of the Department of Theoretical Mechanics of Georgian Polytechnic Institute. Simultaneously he taught courses in a number of specialties at Tbilisi State University. From 1940 until 1954 he worked as an Assistant of the President of the Georgian National Academy of Sciences. In 1960s he was an initiator of organizing a Scientific-Methodological Seminar on Mechanics in Tbilisi.

In 1970, A. Gorgidze was a member of the Presidium of the Scientific-Methodical Council on theoretical mechanics of the Ministry of Higher and Secondary Special Education of the USSR; he headed the Research and Methodological Council on Theoretical Mechanics of Transcaucasia and Georgia; he was a member of the Georgian Mathematical Union. Primary works of A. Gorgidze were devoted to Numerical solution of plane problems in the theory of elasticity; He gave accurate methods for solving problems of torsion and bending of isotropic and anisotropic, homogeneous and heterogeneous prismatic bars. He died on 17 December 1992 in Tbilisi.

== Notable awards ==
- In 1998 he was awarded the State Prize of Georgia posthumously.
- A.Gorgidze was awarded the title "Honored Worker of Science of Georgia" in 1969, later he was awarded by orders and medals.

== In memory ==
- Prize named after A. Gorgidze was established in Engineering Academy of Georgia in 1993.
- A name of A. Gorgidze was given to Scientific-methodological Seminar on Mechanics of the Union of Georgian mechanics.
- One of the streets in Kutaisi was named after A. Gorgidze in 2001.
- Student Fellowship named after A. Gorgidze was established in Georgian Technical University
- Scientific-Educational Center on mechanical engineering was named after A. Gorgidze
