= Alexey Kokhanov =

Russian singer (born 1981)

- Born: 1981 (age 43–44); Russia
- Genres: contemporary classical music, voice improvisation, performance, sound-art
- Occupation: Musician

Alexey Kokhanov is a singer, sound artist and composer based in Moscow and Berlin. He graduated with honours with a Master of Art in "Lied and Oratorio" at the University Mozarteum Salzburg in 2010, attended an exchange program (Erasmus) at the Conservatoire Nationale Supèrieure Musique de Paris in 2011.

Alexey Kokhanov joined the Flanders Operastudio in Gent, Belgium In 2012. In 2015 Alexey attended laboratory “Voice” with guidance of Natalia Pschenichnikova where he participated in masterclasses of Shelley Hirsh (USA) and Christian Kesten (Germany). In 2016 followed study at the Sound Art Courses in Moscow.

Alexey Kokhanov is a guest artist at the Electrotheatre Stanislavsky and artist of the Krymov’s Laboratory at the School of Dramatic Art Theatre. He has performed at the Shakespeare Festival, Edinburgh Festival 2012 in UK, Perth Festival 2014, Australia, Wellington Festival 2014 in New Zealand, in Barbican Centre in London, UK and Taichung Art Center in Taiwan. From 2015 Alexey starts make performances by himself as a director and composer.

At the Electrotheatre Alexey sings the Protagonist at the opera "Maniozis" by Alexander Beloussoff and role of Seneca in Dmitry Kourljandskij opera “Octavia.Trepanation” directed by Boris Yukhananov (Holland Festival 2017 in Amsterdam, Teatro Olimpico Vicenza).

== Works ==
Performance projects:

=== 2018 ===
August: "Limen" solo performance at the „Here and Now“ exhibition, Bolshoi Manege, Moscow.

July: "Ohrwurm Karaoke" at the "Travel of Piece" Festival, Russia.

July: "Funeral of the Fly" with Masha Kechaeva at the Archstoyanie Festival, Russia.

June: "Marxophony" solo performance at the „Impro Weapons“ Festival, Vienna; Gallery „Am Kindl“ in Berlin; and at the Electrotheatre Moscow by NET Festival

=== 2017 ===
"Down to Zero" 8-channel sound installation and performance at the NET (New European Theatre) Festival, Moscow.

"Distance" performance with Anna Abalikhina at the 11th International Symposium Alanica, Vladikavkaz.

"Russian Camp" solo performance at the opening of “Pink Flamingos” exhibition in Bleek Gallery, Sint Niklaas, Belgium.

"Scores" a laboratory of interpretation with Vladimir Gorlinsky, Moscow.

=== 2016 ===
"Mind the Doors" with Vera Martynov at the opening of the New Space of Theatre of Nations, Moscow.

"Dialogues" at the opening of the „True Stories“ exhibition at the gallery „In der Ruimte“, Gent.

"Interiorisation" at the Architekturtage in Salzburg, Austria.

=== 2015 ===
Interiorisation III, with Vera Martynov as a part of NET Festival, Garage Museum of Contemporary Art, Moscow.

Interiorisation II, Opening of Pop-up Theatre, Saint-Petersburg.

Interiorisation I, Museum of Architectur, Moscow.

=== Music ===
- Marxophony (2018)
- Traumbilder show Alexey Kokhanov, Youn Hee (2016)
- "Dialogues" Sonya Levin, Alexey Kokhanov. Gent 2016 - 1 part (2016)
- "Distance" Anna Abalikhina, Alexey Kokhanov. Vladikavkaz, Russia 2017
