= Aleksey Ivanovich Kandinsky =

Russian musicologist

Aleksey Ivanovich Kandinsky (24 February 1918 – 4 October 2000) was a Soviet musicologist who is known for his writings on contemporary Russian musical life and Russian music of the 19th and early 20th centuries. In addition to writing a biography on Nikolai Rimsky-Korsakov, he penned seminal writings on the works of Mily Balakirev, Alexander Dargomyzhsky, and Sergei Rachmaninoff. In 1969 he was named a Meritorious Artist of the Russian Federation.

== Career ==
From 1935 to 1939 he studied at the Ippolitov-Ivanov College of Music in Moscow where he was a pupil of Vasily Nikolayevich Argamakov. After serving in the Russian Army during World War II, he pursued graduate music studies under Yury Keldïsh at the Moscow Conservatory where he earned a master's degree in 1948 and a Doctorate in 1956. His doctoral dissertation was on the operas of Rimsky-Korsakov.

After earning his master's degree, Kandinsky became a lecturer at the Moscow Conservatory in 1948. He became a full professor there in 1958 and served as the head of the music history department at the Moscow Conservatory from 1959 until 1992.
