= Aleksei Yudkin =

Russian footballer

Personal information
- Full name: Aleksei Igorevich Yudkin
- Date of birth: 20 July 1981 (age 45)
- Height: 1.70 m (5 ft 7 in)
- Position: Midfielder

Youth career
- SDYuShOR-3 Oryol

Senior career*
Years	Team	Apps	(Gls)
1998–2006	FC Oryol	223	(16)
2007	FC Avangard Kursk	33	(1)
2008	FC Volga Ulyanovsk	27	(1)
2009–2015	FC Oryol	130	(10)
- * Club domestic league appearances and goals

Aleksei Igorevich Yudkin (Russian: Алексей Игоревич Юдкин; born 20 July 1981) is a former Russian professional football player.

== Club career ==
He played 5 seasons in the Russian Football National League for FC Oryol, FC Avangard Kursk and FC Volga Ulyanovsk.
