= Aleksey Sychkov =

Belarusian footballer

Personal information
- Date of birth: 4 February 1992 (age 34)
- Place of birth: Mogilev, Belarus
- Height: 1.84 m (6 ft 1/2 in)
- Position: Defender

Team information
- Current team: Gorki

Youth career
- 2008: Savit Mogilev
- 2009–2012: BATE Borisov

Senior career*
| Years | Team | Apps | (Gls) |
| 2008 | Savit Mogilev | 1 | (0) |
| 2009–2012 | BATE Borisov | 0 | (0) |
| 2018– | Gorki | 2 | (0) |

International career
| 2009 | Belarus U17 | | |
| 2010–2011 | Belarus U19 | | |
| 2010–2012 | Belarus U21 | 4 | (0) |
- * Club domestic league appearances and goals as of 21 December 2012

Aleksey Sychkov (Belarusian: Аляксей Сычкоў; Russian: Алексей Сычков; born 4 February 1992) is a former Belarusian professional football player. After leaving BATE Borisov in late 2012 he played for several futsal clubs.
