= Alexey Manikovsky =

Russian general (1865–1920)

Alexey Alekseevich Manikovsky
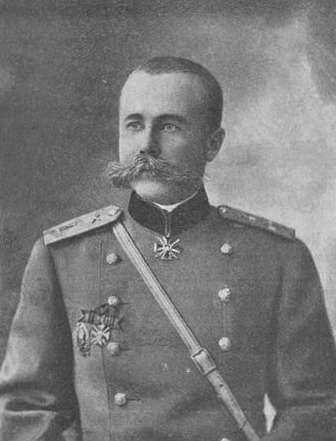
- Born: March 13, 1865; Russian Empire
- Died: 1920; Turkestan, Soviet Union
- Military career
- Allegiance: Russian Empire; Soviet Union
- Unit: General Staff of the Soviet Armed Forces
- Conflicts: World War I Russian Civil War

Alexey Alekseevich Manikovsky (Russian: Алексей Алексеевич Маниковский) (March 13, 1865 – January 1920, Turkestan) was an artillery general (1916). He served in the Russian Imperial Army and later defected to the Bolsheviks, joining the Red Army. He was also the interim director of the War Ministry of the Provisional Government (1917) and Head of the Artillery Administration and Supply Administration of the Red Army.

== Biography ==
In the first half of 1915, the activities of the Main Artillery Directorate (GAU) were sharply criticized for their inability to make up for the shortage of shells (the so-called "shell hunger"), which threatened the combat readiness of the Russian army. In this crisis situation, May 24 (June 6), 1915, General Manikovsky was appointed head of the GAU: "Sukhomlinov was replaced by liberal Polivanov and honest Shuvaev, and Sergei, although a great prince, was replaced by such a glorious Russian man as Manikovsky."

He proved himself an energetic leader, was able to establish the production of ammunition and by 1917 fully satisfy the needs of the front. Under him, both the existing military production expanded - arms, artillery, shell, powder - and the construction of new plants began. Qualified artillery specialists were recalled from the front, who joined in the work under the leadership of Manikovsky. The GAU activity contributed to the fact that in 1917 the Russian military command was able to plan a large-scale offensive, which did not take place due to the collapse of the army that began after the February Revolution.

One of the employees of Manikovsky, an outstanding gunsmith V.G. Fedorov recalled:

Manikovsky possessed all - literally all - qualities for the ideal boss, colossal seething energy and exceptional abilities. He took all the decisions for himself, with the swoop he chopped down all the obstacles he encountered with his quick and energetic orders ... Distant foresight, the ability to quickly understand any complicated business, courage in decisions and attracting all employees to himself with warmth and directness of his attitude to them were the main qualities of this outstanding person. His favorite words were the saying: “Procrastination of death is like!” In general, he spoke little, although he was an outstanding speaker - his speeches were distinguished by extraordinary enthusiasm and a warm appeal to those present.

He believed that priority should be given to state-owned factories in the distribution of military orders and sharply criticized the overpricing and poor quality of products of private producers, focused on superprofits. In this regard, the industrialists insisted on the resignation of Manikovsky and almost achieved their goal. In March 1916, the Minister of War agreed to transfer the general back to the post of commandant of the Kronstadt fortress (after which Manikovsky asked to send him to the army). However, the possibility of disrupting the supply of the army with ammunition in the event of the departure of the competent chief of the GAU forced the military leadership to leave Manikovsky at his post.

After this, conflicts with industrialists continued - the general insisted on the obligatory fulfillment of state orders by the private industry. He proposed the creation of “military production cells” in all private plants under the control of the GAU. According to Manikovsky, strong state-owned enterprises should dominate industry during the war, and in peacetime - to serve as a price regulator and the vanguard of technological progress. At the same time, Manikovsky also allowed the active development of private enterprise, but within the general framework of state-monopoly capitalism.

=== Russian revolution ===
He was close to part of the Duma opposition, one of the leaders of which, N. V. Nekrasov, during the February Revolution, read Manikovsky to the role of military dictator. Since March 6, 1917 - Assistant Secretary of War. He temporarily managed the Ministry of War after the resignation of A.I. Guchkov (late April – early May 1917) and after serving on leave – the actual resignation – A.I. Verkhovsky (October 1917). October 25, 1917 was arrested in the Winter Palace along with the ministers of the Provisional Government. At the end of October he was released and took over the technical leadership of the military department under the Bolshevik government. He tried to preserve the remnants of the fighting capacity of the army, opposed the election of commanders, in connection with which he was accused of disloyalty and was arrested again on November 20, 1917 (together with the chief of the General Staff V.V. Marushevsky). 10 days later he was released.

He served in the Red Army, in 1918–1919 as head of the Artillery Directorate, head of the Central Supply Department of the Red Army (January 6 to August 14, 1918). He was a permanent member of the Artillery Committee. In many respects, it was to him that the Bolsheviks were obliged to create their own artillery and organize an ammunition supply system for the army. In January 1920 he was sent on a business trip to Tashkent; heading there, he died in a train accident.
