= Aleksei Smirnov (footballer) =

Russian footballer

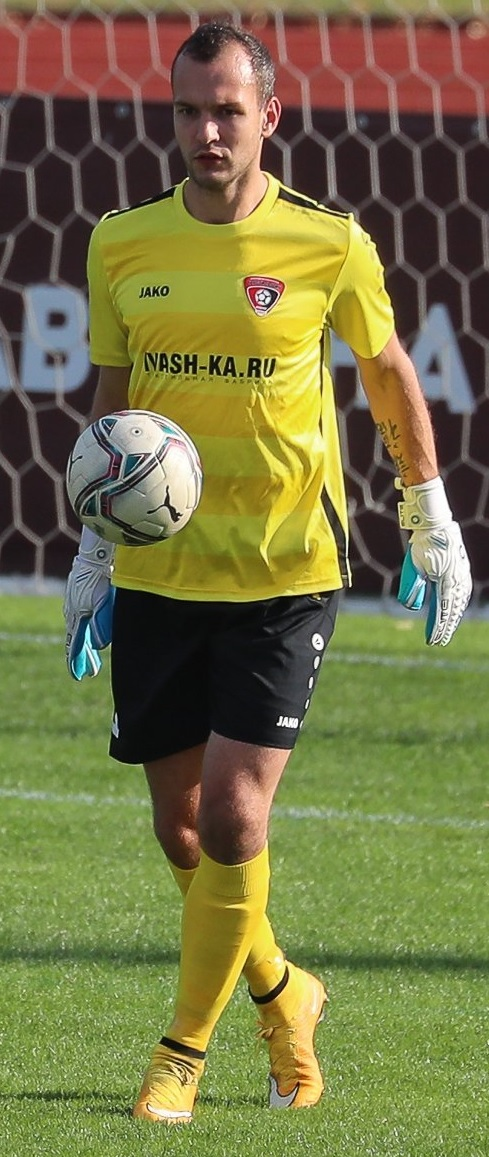
- Smirnov with Tekstilshchik Ivanovo in 2021

Personal information
- Full name: Aleksei Sergeyevich Smirnov
- Date of birth: 15 April 1994 (age 32)
- Place of birth: Ivanovo, Russia
- Height: 1.91 m (6 ft 3 in)
- Position: Goalkeeper

Youth career
- Tekstilshchik Ivanovo

Senior career*
Years	Team	Apps	(Gls)
2013–2022	Tekstilshchik Ivanovo	152	(0)
2022–2023	KAMAZ	3	(0)
2024	Tekstilshchik Ivanovo	0	(0)
2024	Dynamo Bryansk	3	(0)
- * Club domestic league appearances and goals as of 10 August 2024

Aleksei Sergeyevich Smirnov (Russian: Алексей Сергеевич Смирнов; born 15 April 1994) is a Russian football player.

== Club career ==
He made his debut in the Russian Professional Football League for Tekstilshchik Ivanovo on 27 September 2013 in a game against Sever Murmansk. He made his Russian Football National League debut for Tekstilshchik on 24 July 2019 in a game against Krasnodar-2.
