= Aleksei Troitsky (footballer) =

Russian footballer

Personal information
- Full name: Aleksei Yevlampiyevich Troitsky
- Date of birth: 1894
- Date of death: 1958 (aged 63–64)
- Position: Striker

Senior career*
Years	Team	Apps	(Gls)
1913–1915	Union Moscow		
1916–1918	Novogireyevo Moscow		
1919–1922	KFS Moscow		
1923	FC Dynamo Moscow		
1924	Krasnye Sokolniki Moscow		
1925–1928	ORK Moscow		
1929–1930	ZKL Moscow		

International career
1914	Russia	2	(0)
- * Club domestic league appearances and goals

Aleksei Yevlampiyevich Troitsky (Russian: Алексей Евлампиевич Троицкий; 1894–1958) was an association football player.

== International career ==
Troitsky made his debut for Russia on July 5, 1914, in a friendly against Sweden.
