= Alexei Zavarukhin =

Russian ice hockey player

- Born: October 30, 1980 (age 44); Chelyabinsk, Russian SFSR
- Height: 5 ft 8 in (173 cm)
- Weight: 180 lb (82 kg; 12 st 12 lb)
- Position: Center
- Shot: Left
- Played for: Traktor Chelyabinsk; Spartak Moscow; Neftekhimik Nizhnekamsk; Sibir Novosibirsk
- Playing career: 2000–2016

Alexei Zavarukhin (Russian: Алексей Заварухин; born October 30, 1980) is a Russian former professional ice hockey center who played in the Kontinental Hockey League (KHL). He is currently serving as the head coach for former club, Spartak Moscow in the KHL.
