= Alexey Rafaelovich Kolesnikov =

Post-Soviet artist, illustrator, and writer

Alexey Kolesnikov
- Олексій Колесніков
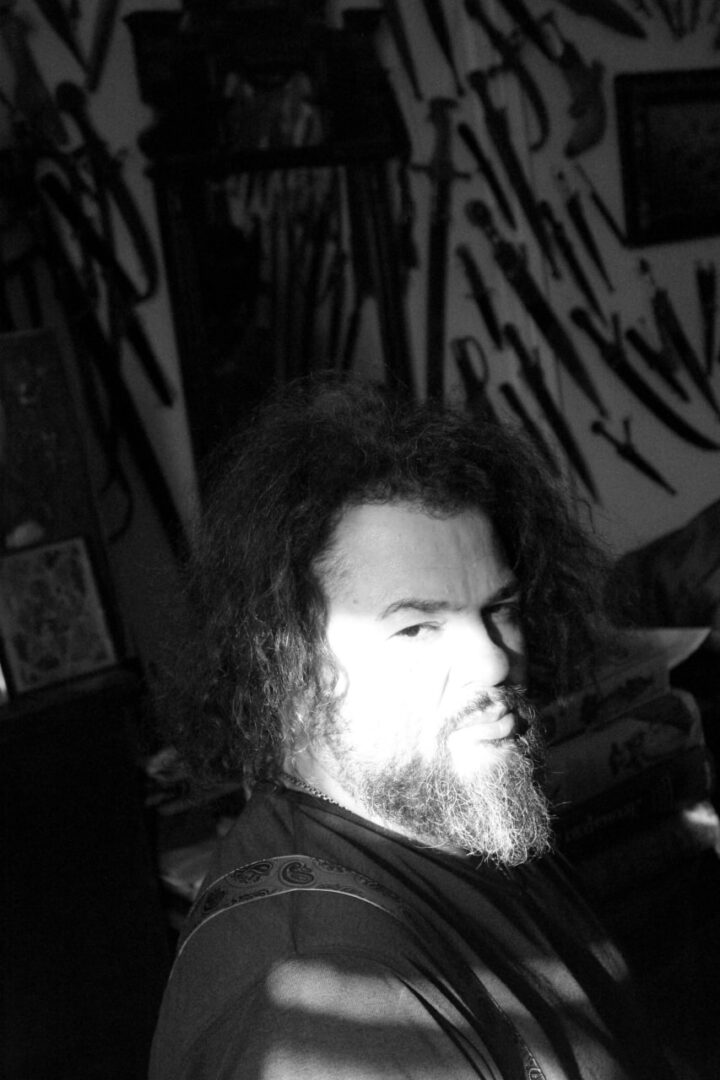
- Born: Alexey Rafaelovich Kolesnikov; April 6, 1964 (age 62); Chita, USSR
- Occupations: Artist, illustrator, writer
- Years active: 1988–present
- Notable work: The Land of May Beetles
- Website: www.alexeykolesnikov.com

Alexey Rafaelovich Kolesnikov (Ukrainian: Олексій Рафаельович Колесніков; born 6 April 1964) is a post-Soviet artist and illustrator known for his work in easel painting, book illustration, and graphic arts. Since 2018, he has also been active as a writer. He lives and works in Vienna, Austria.

== Biography ==
Kolesnikov was born on 6 April 1964 in Chita, then part of the USSR. In 1991, he graduated from the National Academy of Visual Arts and Architecture, where he studied under Vasyl Chebanik and Halyna Halynsky. In 1996, he completed postgraduate studies at the National Academy of Arts of Ukraine under Heorhiy Yakutovych.

Since 1988, he has participated in professional art exhibitions, and from 1989 he has worked as an illustrator with major publishing houses in Kyiv.

== Artistic work ==
=== Book illustration and graphics ===
Kolesnikov works in book illustration and easel graphics, maintaining a style that blends allegorical, symbolic, and realistic imagery. His illustrations have been published by several publishing houses.

Notable book illustration projects include:

- Haidamaky by Taras Shevchenko (1991)
- The Adventures of Pinocchio by Carlo Collodi (2015–2025)

=== Easel painting ===
Through his art, he builds his own vision of Europe's cultural legacy, reshaping it with new meaning and rethinking the cultural traditions, recast entirely in his own voice. Selected works include:

- Lucretia (1996)
- Vegetables and Fruits (2001)
- The Sirin Bird (2003)
- Cupid and Psyche (2012)

== Exhibitions ==
Kolesnikov has participated in numerous solo and group exhibitions, including:

- The Artist and the Book, Kyiv (1988)
- Republican Exhibition for the 500th Anniversary of the Ukrainian Cossacks, Kyiv (1991)
- Transformations, solo exhibition at Bumbershoot Arts Festival, Seattle, USA (1999)
- New Old Masters project, Kyiv, Lviv, and Dnipro (2011–2012)

== Literary work ==
In 2018, Kolesnikov wrote the novella The Land of May Beetles, published in 2019. A review in Darker described the work as "a must-visit" for readers interested in mysterious and fantastical themes.

The second novella Lusina Yama was shortlisted for the sixth season of the White Crow 2025 competition and received special recognition from the jury for its unconventional concept and magical language.
