= Alexey Semyonov (footballer, born 1949) =

Russian footballer and coach

Personal information
- Full name: Alexey Alexandrovich Semyonov
- Date of birth: 15 April 1949 (age 77)
- Position: Goalkeeper

Team information
- Current team: FC Rubin Kazan (head scout)

Senior career*
Years	Team	Apps	(Gls)
1968	FC Avanhard Zhovti Vody	15	(0)
1969–1971	FC Dnipro Dnipropetrovsk	24	(0)
1972–1973	FC Kryvbas Kryvyi Rih	27	(0)
1975–1977	FC Rubin Kazan	47	(0)

Managerial career
- 1987: FC Rubin Kazan (assistant)
- 1987–1988: FC Rubin Kazan
- 1994–1995: FC Rubin Kazan (assistant)
- 1996–2001: FC Rubin Kazan (assistant)
- 2002: FC Rubin Kazan (assistant)
- 2003–2006: FC Rubin Kazan (reserves asst)
- 2007–2008: FC Rubin Kazan (reserves VP)
- 2009–: FC Rubin Kazan (head scout)
- * Club domestic league appearances and goals

Alexey Alexandrovich Semyonov (Russian: Алексе́й Алекса́ндрович Семёнов; born 15 April 1949) is a Russian professional association football coach and a former player who currently works as a head scout for FC Rubin Kazan.

Semyonov played in the Soviet First League with FC Avanhard Zhovti Vody, FC Dnipro Dnipropetrovsk, FC Kryvbas Kryvyi Rih and FC Rubin Kazan.
