= Alexey Soloviev (boxer) =

Russian boxer

Personal information
- Nationality: Russian
- Born: September 14, 1973 (age 52) in Cheboksary, Russia
- Height: 6 ft 3 in (190cm)
- Weight: Heavyweight

Boxing career
- Stance: Orthodox

Boxing record
- Total fights: 18
- Wins: 18
- Win by KO: 12
- Losses: 0
- Draws: 0

Alexey Soloviev (born 14 September 1973) is a Russian professional boxer who once held the IBF International heavyweight title.

Alexey Soloviev was born on the fourteenth of September, 1973 in Cheboksary, Russia. He made his professional boxing debut on the twenty ninth of April, 2004 by beating Pavel Kalabin in a sixth round unanimous decision. In 2006, Soloviev won the vacant CISBB heavyweight title from Oleg Belikov. He never defended the title. In 2007, Soloviev stopped Talgat Dosanov in the eleventh round to win the IBF International. He defended it in the following year by knocking out Raymond Ochieng in the third round. Alexey retired after defeating Ibrahim Labaran in just two rounds. He had an undefeated record of 18 fights, 18 victories, and 12 by way of knockout.

== Professional boxing record ==
18 fights	18 wins	0 losses
By knockout	12	0
By decision	6	0

No.	Result	Record	Opponent	Type	Round, time	Date	Location	Notes
18	Win	18-0	(Ghana) Ibrahim Labaran	RTD	2 (6)	24 June 2011	Open Air Field, Cheboksary, Russia	
17	Win	17-0	(Azerbaijan) Emin Gulmammadov	UD	6	6 February 2010	Aquarium Hotel, Myakinino, Russia	
16	Win	16-0	(Latvia) Pavels Dolgovs	TKO	3 (6)	2 October 2009	Montreal Club, Moscow, Russia	
15	Win	15-0	(Kenya) Raymond Ochieng	TKO	3 (12)	10 May 2008	Circus, Kaluga, Russia	Retained IBF International heavyweight title
14	Win	14-0	(France) Nabil Haciani	TKO	3 (6)	22 September 2007	(Russia) Ponte Milvio, Roma, Italy	
13	Win	13-0	(Kazakhstan) Talgat Dosanov	TKO	11 (12)	23 June 2007	Olympiskiy Stadium, Cheboksary, Russia	Won vacant IBF International heavyweight title
12	Win	12-0	(United States) Levon Warner	UD	6	28 April 2007	(United States) Foxwoods Resort, Mashantucket, Connecticut, USA	
11	Win	11-0	(Ukraine) Oleg Belikov	TKO	3 (12)	12 December 2006	Circus, Nizhny Novgorod, Russia	Won vacant CISBB heavyweight title
10	Win	10-0	(Ukraine) Kostiantyn Okhrei	TKO	2 (10)	13 October 2006	Pyramide, Kazan, Russia	
9	Win	9-0	(Belarus) Piotr Sapun	TKO	2 (8)	18 June 2006	Pyramide, Kazan, Russia	
8	Win	8-0	(Russia) Alexey Osokin	UD	8	25 May 2006	Pyramide, Kazan, Russia	
7	Win	7-0	(Russia) Alexander Tsytsarov	UD	4	30 March 2006	Tolyatti, Russia	
6	Win	6-0	(Russia) Daniil Peretyatko	UD	6	17 February 2006	Pyramide, Kazan, Russia	
5	Win	5-0	(Russia) Ratibor Tatarintsev	RTD	1 (6)	2 December 2005	Sports Palace, Nizhny Novgorod, Russia	
4	Win	4-0	(Russia) Eduard Churakov	TKO	3 (4)	18 August 2005	Basket-Hall Arena, Kazan, Russia	
3	Win	3-0	(Russia) Sedrak Agagulyan	TKO	4 (6)	13 May 2005	Sports Palace, Kazan, Russia	
2	Win	2-0	(Russia) Valery Zamiralov	TKO	3 (6)	22 April 2005	Circus, Ufa, Russia	
1	Win	1-0	(Russia) Pavel Kalabin	UD	6	29 April 2004	Basket-Hall Arena, Kazan, Russia	Professional debut

Sporting positions
Regional boxing titles
Vacant Title last held by Siarhei Dychkou	CISBB heavyweight champion 20 November 2006 - 2 June 2012	Vacant Title next held by Andrzej Wawrzyk
Vacant Title last held by N/A	IBF International heavyweight champion 23 June 2007 - 24 October 2009	Vacant Title next held by Tomasz Adamek
