= Aleksei Tretyakov =

Russian footballer

Personal information
- Full name: Aleksei Vladimirovich Tretyakov
- Date of birth: 4 June 2001 (age 25)
- Place of birth: Krasnoyarsk, Russia
- Height: 1.77 m (5 ft 10 in)
- Position: Midfielder

Youth career
- FC Yenisey Krasnoyarsk

Senior career*
Years	Team	Apps	(Gls)
2018–2021	FC Yenisey Krasnoyarsk	1	(0)
2021–2022	FC Yenisey-2 Krasnoyarsk	30	(3)
2022–2023	FC SKA Rostov-on-Don	28	(0)
2023–2024	FC Kosmos Dolgoprudny	29	(1)
- * Club domestic league appearances and goals as of 3 November 2024

Aleksei Vladimirovich Tretyakov (Russian: Алексей Владимирович Третьяков; born 4 June 2001) is a Russian football player.

== Club career ==
He made his debut in the Russian Football National League for FC Yenisey Krasnoyarsk on 27 September 2020 in a game against FC Krasnodar-2.
