= Aleksei Rogachyov =

Russian footballer

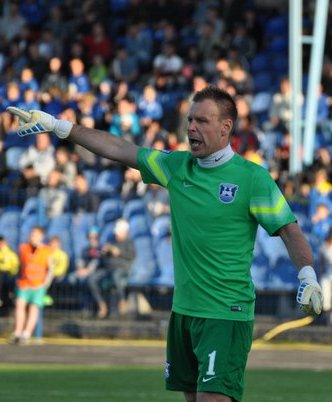

Personal information
- Full name: Aleksei Sergeyevich Rogachyov
- Date of birth: 7 December 1979 (age 46)
- Place of birth: Kaliningrad, Soviet Union
- Height: 1.87 m (6 ft 1 1/2 in)
- Position: Goalkeeper

Senior career*
Years	Team	Apps	(Gls)
1997	Baltika-FSh Kaliningrad	24	(0)
1998	Pioner Kaliningrad	21	(0)
1999	Volna Kaliningrad	17	(0)
2000–2001	Lokomotiv Nizhny Novgorod	1	(0)
2001	Torpedo Pavlovo	17	(0)
2002–2011	Baltika Kaliningrad	164	(0)
2012–2014	Olimpia Elbląg	50	(0)
2014–2015	Zenit Penza	25	(0)
2015–2017	Baltika Kaliningrad	10	(0)
Total		329	(0)
- * Club domestic league appearances and goals

Aleksei Sergeyevich Rogachyov (Russian: Алексей Серге́евич Рогачёв; born 7 December 1979) is a Russian former professional footballer who played as a goalkeeper.

== Club career ==
Rogachyov made his debut in the Russian Premier League in 2000 for FC Lokomotiv Nizhny Novgorod.
