= Aleksei Kuvshinov =

Russian footballer

Personal information
- Full name: Aleksei Olegovich Kuvshinov
- Date of birth: 25 January 1992 (age 34)
- Place of birth: Kaltan, Russia
- Height: 1.79 m (5 ft 10 in)
- Positions: Midfielder; forward

Senior career*
Years	Team	Apps	(Gls)
2011–2012	FC KUZBASS Kemerovo	1	(0)
2013–2018	FC Sibir Novosibirsk	12	(0)
2013–2016	→ FC Sibir-2 Novosibirsk	68	(9)
2017–2018	→ FC Sokol Saratov (loan)	24	(0)
2018	FC Shakhta Raspadskaya Mezhdurechensk (amateur)		
- * Club domestic league appearances and goals

Aleksei Olegovich Kuvshinov (Russian: Алексей Олегович Кувшинов; born 25 January 1992) is a Russian former football player.

== Club career ==
He made his debut in the Russian Second Division for FC KUZBASS Kemerovo on 2 May 2012 in a game against FC Chita.

He made his Russian Football National League debut for FC Sibir Novosibirsk on 11 October 2015 in a game against FC Arsenal Tula.
