= Aleksei Shvalev =

Russian ice hockey player

- Born: 25 May 1987 (age 38) Leningrad, Russian SFSR, Soviet Union
- Height: 6 ft 3 in (191 cm)
- Weight: 203 lb (92 kg; 14 st 7 lb)
- Position: Defence
- Shoots: Right
- SM-liiga team: HPK
- Playing career: 2005–present

Aleksei Shvalev (born 25 May 1987) is a Russian professional ice hockey player who played with HPK in the SM-liiga during the 2010–11 season.
