= Aleksei Ryazanov =

Russian footballer

Personal information
- Full name: Aleksei Aleksandrovich Ryazanov
- Date of birth: 21 July 1975 (age 51)
- Place of birth: Tambov, Russian SFSR
- Height: 1.78 m (5 ft 10 in)
- Position: Midfielder

Senior career*
Years	Team	Apps	(Gls)
1993–1999	FC Spartak Tambov	199	(17)
2000	FC Metallurg Lipetsk	20	(1)
2001–2002	FC Spartak Tambov	72	(11)
2003–2008	FC Ryazan	171	(11)
2008	FC Dynamo-Voronezh Voronezh	16	(2)
2009–2013	FC Spartak Tambov	120	(13)
- * Club domestic league appearances and goals

Aleksei Aleksandrovich Ryazanov (Russian: Алексей Александрович Рязанов; born 21 July 1975) is a former Russian professional football player.

== Club career ==
He played in the Russian Football National League for FC Metallurg Lipetsk in 2000.
