= Aleksei Tyurgashkin =

Russian footballer

Personal information
- Full name: Aleksei Vasilyevich Tyurgashkin
- Date of birth: 20 July 1981 (age 45)
- Place of birth: Ivanovo, Russian SFSR
- Height: 1.80 m (5 ft 11 in)
- Positions: Midfielder; defender

Senior career*
Years	Team	Apps	(Gls)
1999	FC Spartak-Telekom Shuya	0	(0)
2003–2004	FC Tekstilshchik Ivanovo	40	(1)
2005–2006	FC Spartak Kostroma	60	(1)
2007–2012	FC Torpedo Vladimir	162	(2)
2012–2016	FC Tekstilshchik Ivanovo	96	(5)
- * Club domestic league appearances and goals

Aleksei Vasilyevich Tyurgashkin (Russian: Алексей Васильевич Тюргашкин; born 20 July 1981) is a former Russian professional football player.

== Club career ==
He played in the Russian Football National League for FC Torpedo Vladimir in the 2011–12 season.
