= Alexei Rumiantsev =

- Born: May 31, 1969 (age 56); Saint Petersburg, Russia
- Genres: Jazz; ragtime; classical
- Occupation: Musician
- Instrument: Piano
- Years active: 1985–present
- Labels: Akasaka Kougei Onken AKL Label, YPM Label

Alexei Alexandrovich Rumiantsev (Russian: Алексей Александрович Румянцев; born May 31, 1969) is a Russian jazz and ragtime pianist and classical music composer. His nickname is "RAGTIMEPA", thus he named his band "GRANDPA’S RAGTIME BAND".

== Biography ==
At the age of six, Alexei Rumiantsev took piano lessons and learned the basic technique of playing as well as music theory under Mrs. Tatiana Tavrovskaya. He attended music school for children in Cherepovets and participated in several competitions among young pianists. In 1983, he moved to St. Petersburg to attend the preparatory school for the St. Petersburg state conservatory, then studied composition under Prof. Alexander Mnatsakanian. In 1992, he went to Germany to study both classic compositions under Prof. Christoph Meyer and jazz piano under Prof. John Tailor at the Cologne Conservatory as a student on a scholarship.

After eight years, he went back to Cherepovets to work as a jazz pianist and as a composer and participated in international jazz festivals and gave concerts in Europe, Russia and Japan, including radio recordings. He has been living in Japan since 2003, where he gives concerts and participates in different projects and festivals. He recorded his first ragtime CD Silks and Rags in 2004 and teaches jazz and ragtime to the younger pianists in his spare time. He recorded his second ragtime CD Floating Along in 2018.

Rumiantsev is married to a ragtime and jazz singer Hiromi Rumiantseva who works for MA Trust Co., Ltd. as a multilingual consultant.

== Discography ==
=== Piano solo ===
- Silks and Rags (Akasaka Kougei Onken AKL Label, 2004)
- Floating Along (YPM Label, 2018)

=== with the jazz band ===
- Paradise by Koji Matsumoto Swing System with Alexei Rumiantsev (YPM Label, 2016)
