= Aleksey Gubanov =

Soviet fighter pilot (1918–1982)

- Алексей Алексеевич Губанов
- Born: 12 March 1918; Moscow
- Died: 26 July 1982 (aged 64); Voronezh
- Military career
- Allegiance: Soviet Union
- Branch: Soviet Air Force
- Service years: 1937—1973
- Rank: Colonel
- Conflicts: World War II; Invasion of Poland; Winter War; Eastern Front
- Awards: Hero of the Soviet Union

Aleksey Alekseevich Gubanov (Russian: Алексей Алексеевич Губанов; 12 March 1918 – 26 July 1982) was a Soviet fighter pilot during World War II. He was awarded the title Hero of the Soviet Union on 24 August 1943 for his initial victories. By the end of the war his tally reached an estimated 23 solo and six shared shootdowns.
