= Alexey Chesnakov =

Russian political scientist

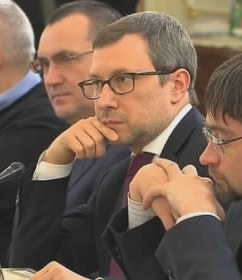
Alexey Chesnakov at the meeting of the Chairman of the Government of the Russian Federation Vladimir Putin with political scientists

Alexey Chesnakov (born September 1, 1970, Baku, Azerbaijan SSR) is a Russian political scientist and director of the Center for current policy (CCP). He is the author of several publications dealing with the domestic and foreign policy of Russia. Chesnakov has also served as deputy head of internal policy for the Administration President of the Russian Federation (2001–2008), as a member of the Civic Chamber of the Russian Federation (2009–2010), and Deputy Secretary-General of the United Russia political party (2012–2013). Since 2019, Chesnakov has been a professor at the Higher School of Economics.

== Education ==
Graduated from the Faculty of Philosophy at Moscow State University.

Researcher, Institute of Mass Political Movements of the Russian-American University (RAU), 1991–93.

Research Fellow & Project Manager, Center for Current Politics in Russia (CPC), 1993–97.

Director of the Center for Current Politics in Russia (CPC); director of the Center for Social and Political Information Institute of Social and Political Research (ISPR) 1997–2000.

In 2000, Chesnakov defended his thesis, "The Electoral Process as a Form of Structuring the Political Regime: The Case of Elections to the State Duma".

== Political activity ==
Head of Information and Analytical Planning, Deputy Head of the Internal Policy of the Presidential Administration, 2001–08.

Member of the Public Chamber of the Russian Federation, 2009–10.

Chairman of the Public Council Presidium of the General Council of the political party "United Russia" in interaction with the media and expert community, 2010–11.

Deputy Secretary of the General Council of the political party "United Russia", 2012-Jan. 2013.
