= Aleksei Bespalikov =

Russian politician (1948–2021)

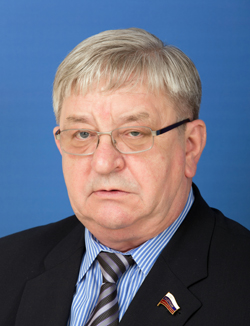
- Bespalikov in 2013

Member of the Federation Council of Russia
- In office 24 November 2010 – 1 October 2014
- Preceded by: Anatoly Saltykov
- Succeeded by: Nadezhda Boltenko
- Constituency: Novosibirsk Oblast

Member of the Legislative Assembly of Novosibirsk Oblast
- In office 2005–2010

Personal details
- Born: 27 March 1948 Novosibirsk, Russian SFSR, Soviet Union
- Died: 30 April 2021 (aged 73) Novosibirsk, Russia

Aleksei Akimovich Bespalikov (Russian: Алексей Акимович Беспаликов; 27 March 1948 – 30 April 2021) was a Russian politician. He served on the Legislative Assembly of Novosibirsk Oblast from 2005 to 2010 and the Federation Council of Russia from 2010 to 2014.

== Political career ==
In 1991, he began working in the Novosibirsk city executive committee, where he was responsible for vocational schools (PTUs) involved in training workers for the metal industry.

He served as Chairman of the Novosibirsk Regional Council of Deputies of the fourth convocation from 2005 to 2010.

From November 24, 2010, to September 2015, he was a member of the Federation Council Committee on Federal Structure, Regional Policy, Local Self-Government, and Affairs of the North. He represented the executive authority of Novosibirsk Oblast in the Federation Council.

He died on April 30, 2021, after a prolonged illness, at the age of 73.

== Family ==
He was married. He had two daughters, a granddaughter and a grandson.

== Awards ==
- Medal of the Order of Merit for the Fatherland, II degree
- Order of Sergius of Radonezh, III degree
- Order of Friendship of the Republic of Kampuchea
- Medal of the 3rd Hero of the Soviet Union Pokryshkin A.I.
- Order of Ivan Kalita
- Commemorative medal "Federation Council. 15 years old"
- Badge of Honour of the Novosibirsk Regional Council of Deputies
