= Aleksei Vasiliev (ice hockey, born 1984) =

Russian ice hockey player

- Born: September 10, 1984 (age 41)
- Height: 6 ft 2 in (188 cm)
- Weight: 209 lb (95 kg; 14 st 13 lb)
- Position: Forward
- Played for: HC MVD (RSL); Molot-Prikamye Perm (RSL)
- NHL draft: Undrafted
- Playing career: 2001–2009

Aleksei Vasiliev (Алексей Васильев; born September 10, 1984) is a retired Russian professional ice hockey forward who played in the Russian Superleague with both HC MVD and Molot-Prikamye Perm.
