= Alexei Akifiev =

Russian professional ice hockey forward

- Born: January 22, 1976 (age 50) Samara, Russia
- Height: 6 ft 0 in (183 cm)
- Weight: 209 lb (95 kg; 14 st 13 lb)
- Position: Left wing
- Shoots: Right
- KHL team: HC Sibir Novosibirsk
- NHL draft: Undrafted
- Playing career: 1995–present

Alexei Akifiev (born January 22, 1976) is a Russian professional ice hockey forward who currently plays for HC Sibir Novosibirsk of the Kontinental Hockey League (KHL).
