= Aleksei Panin (footballer) =

Russian footballer

Personal information
- Full name: Aleksei Alekseyevich Panin
- Date of birth: 23 February 1979 (age 47)
- Height: 1.75 m (5 ft 9 in)
- Position: Midfielder

Senior career*
Years	Team	Apps	(Gls)
1996–1997	FC Lokomotiv Nizhny Novgorod	0	(0)
1996–1997	→ FC Lokomotiv-d Nizhny Novgorod (loans)	40	(4)
1997	FC Torpedo Pavlovo	8	(0)
1998–2000	FC Khimik Dzerzhinsk	71	(11)
2000	FC Lokomotiv Nizhny Novgorod	1	(0)
2001–2003	FC Torpedo Pavlovo	64	(1)
2003–2006	FC Energetik Uren	73	(7)
2006	FC Vizit Dzerzhinsk		
2007	FC Khimik Dzerzhinsk (amateur)		
2008	FC Khimik Dzerzhinsk	31	(3)
2009	FC Uran-Khimik-D Dzerzhinsk		
2010–2014	FC Progress Bolshoye Murashkino		
2014	FC Sokol Sokolskoye		
- * Club domestic league appearances and goals

Aleksei Alekseyevich Panin (Russian: Алексей Алексеевич Панин; born 23 February 1979) is a former Russian football player.
