= Alexey Gamen =

Russian lieutenant general and commander

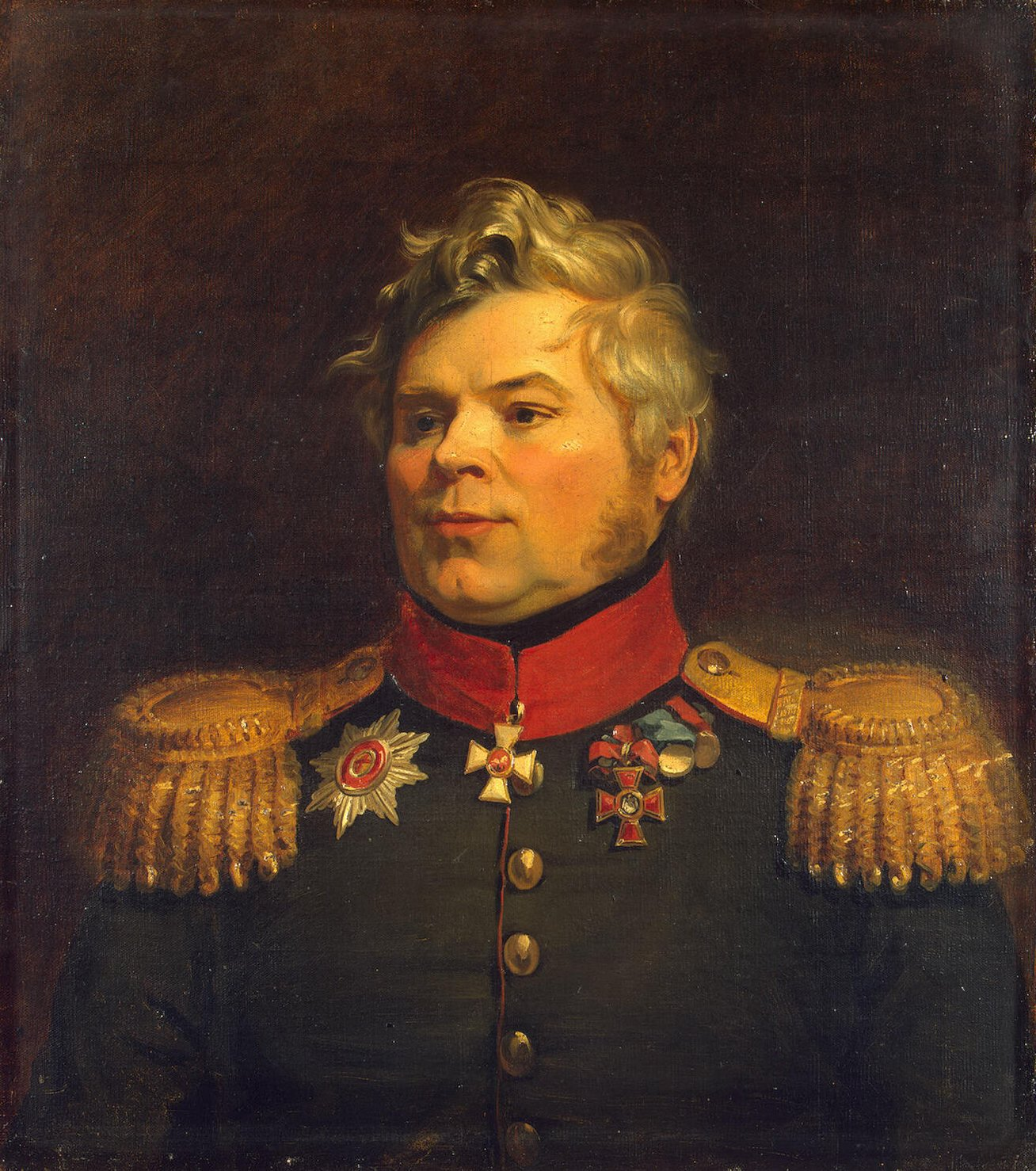
Lieutenant general Gamen

Alexey Yurievich Gamen (Russian: Алексей Юрьевич Гамен; 18 May 1773 – 1829) was a Russian lieutenant general and commander of the Napoleonic Wars. He was from a noble family (his father was a court physician to Catherine II of Russia) whose ancestors had immigrated to Russia in the 17th century.

== Biography ==
He was born in Gzhatsk, Smolensk Governorate (now Gagarin, Smolensk Oblast.
