= Aleksei Lopatin =

Russian footballer

Personal information
- Full name: Aleksei Olegovich Lopatin
- Date of birth: 12 March 1985 (age 41)
- Place of birth: Lipetsk, Russian SFSR
- Height: 1.87 m (6 ft 1 1/2 in)
- Position: Defender

Youth career
- FC Metallurg Lipetsk
- FC Lokomotiv Moscow

Senior career*
Years	Team	Apps	(Gls)
2003	FC Lokomotiv Moscow	0	(0)
2004–2006	FC Metallurg Lipetsk	36	(0)
2007–2008	FC Spartak Tambov	53	(2)
2009	FC Yelets	3	(0)
- * Club domestic league appearances and goals

Aleksei Olegovich Lopatin (Russian: Алексей Олегович Лопатин; born 12 March 1985) is a former Russian professional football player.

== Club career ==
He played in the Russian Football National League for FC Metallurg Lipetsk in 2005.
