= Alexei Mitrofanov (ice hockey) =

Russian ice hockey player

- Born: June 11, 1994 (age 32) Voskresensk, Russia
- Height: 6 ft 0 in (183 cm)
- Weight: 176 lb (80 kg; 12 st 8 lb)
- Position: Forward
- Shoots: Left
- VHL team Former teams: HC Yugra; Salavat Yulaev Ufa
- Playing career: 2011–present

Alexei Mitrofanov (born June 11, 1994) is a Russian professional ice hockey forward who plays with HC Yugra of the Supreme Hockey League (VHL).

== Career ==
Mitrofanov played 55 games with Tolpar Ufa during the 2013–14 season, scoring 40 goals and 52 assists in to lead the MHL in goals, assists, and points. He was named to the 2013–2014 MHL All-Star Game. The following season, he played two games in the Kontinental Hockey League for Salavat Yulaev Ufa.

== Awards and honours ==
Award	Year
MHL Most Assists (52)	2013–14
MHL Most Goals (40)	2013–14
MHL Most Points (92)	2013–14
MHL All-Star Game	2013–14
