= Aleksei Mikheyev (footballer) =

Russian footballer (born 1998)

Personal information
- Full name: Aleksei Andreyevich Mikheyev
- Date of birth: 15 January 1998 (age 28)
- Place of birth: Novosibirsk, Russia
- Height: 1.75 m (5 ft 9 in)
- Position: Forward

Senior career*
Years	Team	Apps	(Gls)
2016	FC Sibir-2 Novosibirsk	1	(0)
2017–2018	FC Sibir Novosibirsk	1	(0)
2017	→ FC Chita (loan)	0	(0)
- * Club domestic league appearances and goals

Aleksei Andreyevich Mikheyev (Russian: Алексей Андреевич Михеев; born 15 January 1998) is a Russian former football player.

== Club career ==
He made his debut in the Russian Professional Football League for FC Sibir-2 Novosibirsk on 21 April 2016 in a game against FC Sakhalin Yuzhno-Sakhalinsk.

He made his Russian Football National League debut for FC Sibir Novosibirsk on 17 April 2017 in a game against FC Dynamo Moscow.
