= 1977 in association football =

The following are the football (soccer) events of the year 1977 throughout the world.

== Events ==
- September 14 – Dutch club AZ'67 makes its European debut by defeating Red Boys Differdange (11–1) in the first round of the UEFA Cup, with four goals from midfielder Jan Peters.
- Copa Libertadores 1977: Won by Boca Juniors after defeating Cruzeiro 5–4 in a penalty shootout after an aggregate score of 0–0.

== Winners club national championship ==
=== Asia ===
- Qatar – Al-Esteqlal

=== Europe ===
- England – Liverpool
- France – Nantes
- Italy – Juventus
- Netherlands – Ajax
- Portugal – Benfica
- Scotland – Celtic
- Spain – Atlético Madrid
- Switzerland – Basel
- Turkey – Trabzonspor
- West Germany – Borussia Mönchengladbach
- Yugoslavia – Red Star Belgrade

=== North America ===
- Mexico – UNAM
- United States / Canada:
  - New York Cosmos (NASL)

=== Oceania ===
- Australia - Sydney City

=== South America ===
- Argentina
  - Metropolitano – River Plate
  - Nacional – Independiente
- Brazil – São Paulo

== European competitions ==
- European Champions Cup: Liverpool
- UEFA Cup: Juventus
- European Cup Winners' Cup: Hamburger SV

== International tournaments ==
- 1977 British Home Championship (May 28 – June 4, 1977)

Scotland

== Births ==
=== January ===
- January 2 — Gavin Mahon, English club footballer
- January 5
  - Luis Daniel Cupla, Uruguayan footballer
  - Aleksei Peplov, former Russian footballer
- January 7 — Marco Storari, Italian footballer
- January 8 — Francesco Coco, Italian footballer
- January 9 — Nihat Emre Numanbayraktaroğlu, Turkish former footballer
- January 16 — Lionel Moret, retired Swiss footballer
- January 21
  - Phil Neville, English international footballer
  - Paul Weerman, Dutch footballer
- January 28 – Terry Dyer, Dominican former international footballer

=== February ===
- February 5 — Rodrigo Núñez, Chilean footballer
- February 6 — Godfrey Ssali, Ugandan footballer
- February 8 — Jan Õun, Estonian footballer
- February 11 — Raivo Nõmmik, Estonian footballer
- February 19 — Gianluca Zambrotta, Italian international footballer
- February 20 — Niklas Storbacka, Finnish footballer
- February 28
  - Milan Drageljević, Serbian former footballer
  - Artur Wichniarek, Polish international footballer

=== March ===
- March 17 — Rustam Mustafin, Russian professional football coach, former player

=== April ===
- April 26 — Raphaël Wicky, Swiss international footballer
- April 28
  - Rachid Berouas, Moroccan footballer
  - Aleksei Gridnev, former Russian footballer

=== May ===
- May 3 — Noel Valladares, Honduran international footballer
- May 7 — Łukasz Sosin, Polish international footballer
- May 10 — Feras Taleb, Jordanian footballer
- May 11 — Pablo Gabriel García, Uruguayan international footballer
- May 12 — Aivar Priidel, Estonian footballer
- May 13 — Aleksei Dudin, former Russian footballer
- May 18 — Ramil Kharisov, former Russian footballer
- May 25 — Andre Anis, Estonian footballer
- May 26 — Luca Toni, Italian international footballer

=== June ===
- June 1 — Michał Świstak, Polish former professional footballer
- June 13 — Lorenzo Mathiot, Seychellois footballer
- June 14 — Fernando Martínez, Mexican football manager and former player
- June 15 — Rui Almeida Monteiro, Dutch footballer
- June 27 — Raúl, Spanish international footballer

=== July ===
- July 3 — Márcio Hahn, Brazilian football coach and former player
- July 6 — Irakli Gemazashvili, Georgian international footballer
- July 9 — Bogdan Stefanović, retired Serbian-Slovak footballer
- July 10 — Levan Kobiashvili, Georgian international footballer
- July 12 — Marco Silva, Portuguese football player and manager
- July 24 — Mehdi Mahdavikia, Iranian international footballer
- July 26 — Anatoli Mironov, Russian professional football coach and former player
- July 31 — Bolívar Gómez, Ecuadorian footballer

=== August ===
- August 1 — Gonzalo Iván Largo Romero, Spanish football player
- August 5 — Krzysztof Kretkowski, Polish footballer
- August 16 — Pavel Královec, Czech football referee
- August 17 — Thierry Henry, French international footballer
- August 18 — Denis Solovyov, professional football coach and former player
- August 23 — Luis Rubiales, Spanish football player and administrator
- August 29 — Frank Broers, Dutch footballer

=== September ===
- September 1 — Kwabena Boafo, Ghanaian footballer
- September 14 — Edgar Streltsov, former Russian footballer
- September 15 — Denis Soskov, former Russian footballer
- September 17 — Simone Perrotta, Italian international footballer
- September 27 — Sébastien Pauvert, French professional football
- September 29 — Harry Libanotis, Seychellois footballer

=== October ===
- October 1 — Carsten Birk, German former professional footballer
- October 10 — Aleksandr Grekhov, former Russian footballer
- October 13 — Antonio Di Natale, Italian international footballer
- October 15 — David Trezeguet, French international footballer
- October 20 — Tebogo Mothusi, Botswana footballer
- October 23 — Lee Shearer, English former professional footballer
- October 24 — Iván Kaviedes, Ecuadorian footballer
- October 25 — Birgit Prinz, German footballer

=== November ===
- November 17 — Paul Shepherd, English footballer
- November 21 — Sidwell Mothea, Lesotho footballer
- November 22 — Michael Preston, English club footballer
- November 23 — David Lucas, English youth international and coach
- November 28 — Fabio Grosso, Italian international footballer

=== December ===
- December 12 — Toni Bernal, Spanish retired footballer

== Deaths ==
=== January ===
- January 18 – Luciano Re Cecconi (38), Italian football (soccer) player (born 1948)

=== February ===
- February 11 – Luigi Bertolini, Italian midfielder, winner of the 1934 FIFA World Cup. (72; Aortic aneurysm)

=== April ===
- April 28 – Sepp Herberger, German footballer and manager (b. 1897)

=== June ===
- June 9 – Germano Boettcher Sobrinho, Brazilian goalkeeper, squad member at the 1934 FIFA World Cup. (66)
- June 19 – Ernő Schwarz, Hungarian-born American football player and coach. (75)

=== July ===
- July 17 – Billy Gonsalves American international football (soccer player) (born 1908)
- July 23 – Arsenio Erico, Paraguayan international footballer (born 1915)

=== September ===
- September 9 – Mieczysław Batsch, Polish footballer (born 1900)

=== October ===
- October 12 – Juan Carlos Calvo, Uruguayan striker, winner of the 1930 FIFA World Cup. (71)
