= Solovyov =

Solovyov, Solovyev, Soloviov, Solovjev, or Soloviev (Russian: Соловьёв) is a Russian masculine surname, its feminine forms are Solovyova, Solovyeva, Soloviova, Solovjeva or Solovieva. It derives from the first name or nickname Solovei (соловей), which also means nightingale in Russian. The surname may refer to the following people:

- Aleksei Solovyov (born 1996), Russian footballer
- Alexander Solovyov (disambiguation), multiple people
- Alexey Soloviev (disambiguation), multiple people
- Anatoly Solovyev (born 1948), Russian cosmonaut
- Andrey Soloviev (1953–1993), Russian war photographer
- Anjelika Solovieva (born 1980), Kyrgyz swimmer
- Denis Solovyov (born 1977), Russian footballer
- Dmitri Solovyov (born 1989), Russian ice dancer
- Dmitry Solovyov (judoka) (born 1963), Uzbekistani judoka
- Ilya Solovyov (born 2000), Belarusian ice hockey player
- Inna Solovyova (1927–2024), Russian theatre and film critic
- Irina Solovyova (born 1937), Soviet cosmonaut
- Ivan Solovyov (born 1993), Russian football player
- Jegor Solovjov (1871–1942), Estonian politician
- Leonid Solovyov (disambiguation), multiple people
- Lidiia Soloviova (born 1978), Ukrainian powerlifter
- Maksym Solovyov (born 2002), Ukrainian footballer
- Mikhail Solovyov (disambiguation), multiple people
- Nikolay Solovyov (disambiguation), multiple people
- Oleg Solovyov (born 1973), Russian footballer
- Pavel Solovyov (1917–1996), Russian aircraft engine engineer
- Polyxena Solovyova (1867–1924), Russian poet and illustrator
  - Soloviev Design Bureau in Russia
- Sergey Solovyov (disambiguation), multiple people
- Sergey Alexandrovich Solovyov (1944–2021), Soviet/Russian film director
- Stefan Soloviev (born 1975), American Agriculture CEO
- Tymofii Soloviov (born 1999), Ukrainian entrepreneur and singer
- Valeriya Solovyeva (born 1992), Russian tennis player
- Vasily Solovyov-Sedoi (1907–1979), Soviet composer
- Viktor Solovyov (disambiguation), multiple people
- Vladimir Solovyov (disambiguation), multiple people
- Vsevolod Solovyov (1849–1903), Russian historical novelist
- Vyacheslav Solovyov (disambiguation), multiple people
- Yuliya Solovyova (born 1967), Kazakh ice hockey player
- Yuri Soloviev (disambiguation), multiple people

== See also ==
- Solovyovo, several rural localities in Russia
- Soloveitchik
- Ayedonitsky
