= Solovyovo =

Solovyovo (Russian: Соловьёво) is the name of several rural localities in Russia:

- Solovyovo, Puchezhsky District, Ivanovo Oblast, a village in Puchezhsky District of Ivanovo Oblast
- Solovyovo, Verkhnelandekhovsky District, Ivanovo Oblast, a village in Verkhnelandekhovsky District of Ivanovo Oblast; 56°54′N 42°40′E
- Solovyovo, Kaliningrad Oblast, a settlement in Domnovsky Rural Okrug of Pravdinsky District in Kaliningrad Oblast
- Solovyovo, Mezhevskoy District, Kostroma Oblast, a village in Georgiyevskoye Settlement of Mezhevskoy District in Kostroma Oblast; 58°41′N 44°56′E
- Solovyovo, Soligalichsky District, Kostroma Oblast, a village in Kuzeminskoye Settlement of Soligalichsky District in Kostroma Oblast; 59°13′N 42°26′E
- Solovyovo, Vokhomsky District, Kostroma Oblast, a village in Vorobyevitskoye Settlement of Vokhomsky District in Kostroma Oblast; 59°08′N 46°46′E
- Solovyovo, Priozersky District, Leningrad Oblast, a settlement in Gromovskoye Settlement Municipal Formation of Priozersky District in Leningrad Oblast; 60°38′N 30°30′E
- Solovyovo, Volkhovsky District, Leningrad Oblast, a village in Kiselninskoye Settlement Municipal Formation of Volkhovsky District in Leningrad Oblast; 60°03′N 32°07′E
- Solovyovo, Lipetsk Oblast, a selo in Solovyovsky Selsoviet of Stanovlyansky District in Lipetsk Oblast; 52°47′N 38°28′E
- Solovyovo, Mari El Republic, a village in Zashizhemsky Rural Okrug of Sernursky District in the Mari El Republic; 56°57′N 49°28′E
- Solovyovo, Bor, Nizhny Novgorod Oblast, a village in Kantaurovsky Selsoviet under the administrative jurisdiction of the city of oblast significance of Bor in Nizhny Novgorod Oblast; 56°27′N 43°55′E
- Solovyovo, Shakhunya, Nizhny Novgorod Oblast, a village in Khmelevitsky Selsoviet under the administrative jurisdiction of the city of oblast significance of Shakhunya in Nizhny Novgorod Oblast; 57°52′N 46°19′E
- Solovyovo, Knyagininsky District, Nizhny Novgorod Oblast, a village in Solovyovsky Selsoviet of Knyagininsky District in Nizhny Novgorod Oblast; 55°52′N 45°02′E
- Solovyovo, Vachsky District, Nizhny Novgorod Oblast, a village in Chulkovsky Selsoviet of Vachsky District in Nizhny Novgorod Oblast; 55°57′N 42°48′E
- Solovyovo, Volodarsky District, Nizhny Novgorod Oblast, a village in Ilyinsky Selsoviet of Volodarsky District in Nizhny Novgorod Oblast; 56°12′N 42°50′E
- Solovyovo, Soletsky District, Novgorod Oblast, a village in Vybitskoye Settlement of Soletsky District in Novgorod Oblast
- Solovyovo, Volotovsky District, Novgorod Oblast, a village in Slavitinskoye Settlement of Volotovsky District in Novgorod Oblast
- Solovyovo, Perm Krai, a village in Permsky District of Perm Krai
- Solovyovo, Pskov Oblast, a village in Kunyinsky District of Pskov Oblast
- Solovyovo, Samara Oblast, a settlement in Khvorostyansky District of Samara Oblast
- Solovyovo, Smolensk Oblast, a village in Solovyovskoye Rural Settlement of Kardymovsky District in Smolensk Oblast
- Solovyovo, Kimrsky District, Tver Oblast, a village in Goritskoye Rural Settlement of Kimrsky District in Tver Oblast
- Solovyovo, Selizharovsky District, Tver Oblast, a village in Talitskoye Rural Settlement of Selizharovsky District in Tver Oblast
- Solovyovo, Vologda Oblast, a village in Nizhneyerogodsky Selsoviet of Velikoustyugsky District in Vologda Oblast

== See also ==
- Solovyov
