= Shubino, Puchezhsky District, Ivanovo Oblast =

Shubino Шубино
- Village
- Location within Ivanovo Oblast Location within Russia
- Coordinates: 56°56′N 43°01′E
- Country: Russia
- Region: Ivanovo Oblast
- District: Puchezhsky District
- Time zone: UTC+3:00

Shubino (Russian: Шубино) is a rural locality (a village) in Puchezhsky District, Ivanovo Oblast, Russia. Population: 20 (2010 census);

== Geography ==
This rural locality is located 10 kilometres (6.2 mi) from Puchezh (the district's administrative centre), 125 kilometres (78 mi) from Ivanovo (capital of Ivanovo Oblast) and 353 kilometres (219 mi) from Moscow. Ilya-Vysokovo is the nearest rural locality.
