= Verbikha =

Verbikha Вербиха
- Village
- Location within Ivanovo Oblast Location within Russia
- Coordinates: 56°53′N 42°54′E
- Country: Russia
- Region: Ivanovo Oblast
- District: Puchezhsky District
- Time zone: UTC+3:00

Verbikha (Russian: Вербиха) is a rural locality (a village) in Puchezhsky District, Ivanovo Oblast, Russia. Population: 14 (2010 census);

== Geography ==
This rural locality is located 18 kilometres (11 mi) from Puchezh (the district's administrative centre), 118 kilometres (73 mi) from Ivanovo (capital of Ivanovo Oblast) and 345 kilometres (214 mi) from Moscow. Khakhalikha is the nearest rural locality.
