= Gubinskaya, Ivanovo Oblast =

Gubinskaya Губинская
- Village
- Location within Ivanovo Oblast Location within Russia
- Coordinates: 56°55′N 43°01′E
- Country: Russia
- Region: Ivanovo Oblast
- District: Puchezhsky District
- Time zone: UTC+3:00

Gubinskaya (Russian: Губинская) is a rural locality (a village) in Puchezhsky District, Ivanovo Oblast, Russia. Population: 162 (2010 census);

== Geography ==
This rural locality is located 11 kilometres (6.8 mi) from Puchezh (the district's administrative centre), 124 kilometres (77 mi) from Ivanovo (capital of Ivanovo Oblast) and 352 kilometres (219 mi) from Moscow. Ilyinskoye is the nearest rural locality.
