= Slinkovo =

Slinkovo Слиньково
- Village
- Location within Ivanovo Oblast Location within Russia
- Coordinates: 57°00′N 43°03′E
- Country: Russia
- Region: Ivanovo Oblast
- District: Puchezhsky District
- Time zone: UTC+3:00

Slinkovo (Russian: Слиньково) is a rural locality (a village) in Puchezhsky District, Ivanovo Oblast, Russia. Population: 5 (2010 census);

== Geography ==
This rural locality is located 8 kilometres (5.0 mi) from Puchezh (the district's administrative centre), 126 kilometres (78 mi) from Ivanovo (capital of Ivanovo Oblast) and 357 kilometres (222 mi) from Moscow. Dushino is the nearest rural locality.
