= Dynino =

Dynino Дынино
- Village
- Location within Ivanovo Oblast Location within Russia
- Coordinates: 57°04′N 42°53′E
- Country: Russia
- Region: Ivanovo Oblast
- District: Puchezhsky District
- Time zone: UTC+3:00

Dynino (Russian: Дынино) is a rural locality (a village) in Puchezhsky District, Ivanovo Oblast, Russia. Population: 11 (2010 census);

== Geography ==
This rural locality is located 20 kilometres (12 mi) from Puchezh (the district's administrative centre), 117 kilometres (73 mi) from Ivanovo (capital of Ivanovo Oblast) and 351 kilometres (218 mi) from Moscow. Sevryugino is the nearest rural locality.
