= Pyatnitsa-Vysokovo =

Pyatnitsa-Vysokovo Пятница-Высоково
- Village
- Location within Ivanovo Oblast Location within Russia
- Coordinates: 57°03′N 42°57′E
- Country: Russia
- Region: Ivanovo Oblast
- District: Puchezhsky District
- Time zone: UTC+3:00

Pyatnitsa-Vysokovo (Russian: Пятница-Высоково) is a rural locality (a village) in Puchezhsky District, Ivanovo Oblast, Russia. Population: 14 (2010 census);

== Geography ==
This rural locality is located 15 kilometres (9.3 mi) from Puchezh (the district's administrative centre), 121 kilometres (75 mi) from Ivanovo (capital of Ivanovo Oblast) and 354 kilometres (220 mi) from Moscow. Medvedkovo is the nearest rural locality.
