= Petrovo, Puchezhsky District, Ivanovo Oblast =

Petrovo Петрово
- Village
- Location within Ivanovo Oblast Location within Russia
- Coordinates: 57°04′N 42°56′E
- Country: Russia
- Region: Ivanovo Oblast
- District: Puchezhsky District
- Time zone: UTC+3:00

Petrovo (Russian: Петрово) is a rural locality (a selo) in Puchezhsky District, Ivanovo Oblast, Russia. Population: 102 (2010 census);

== Geography ==
This rural locality is located 18 kilometres (11 mi) from Puchezh (the district's administrative centre), 120 kilometres (75 mi) from Ivanovo ( the capital of Ivanovo Oblast) and 354 kilometres (220 mi) from Moscow. Listye is the nearest rural locality.
