= Gremyachevo Verkhneye =

Gremyachevo Verkhneye Гремячево Верхнее
- Village
- Location within Ivanovo Oblast Location within Russia
- Coordinates: 56°59′N 43°06′E
- Country: Russia
- Region: Ivanovo Oblast
- District: Puchezhsky District
- Time zone: UTC+3:00

Gremyachevo Verkhneye (Russian: Гремячево Верхнее) is a rural locality (a village) in Puchezhsky District, Ivanovo Oblast, Russia. Population: 9 (2010 census);

== Geography ==
This rural locality is located 4 kilometres (2.5 mi) from Puchezh (the district's administrative centre), 130 kilometres (81 mi) from Ivanovo (capital of Ivanovo Oblast) and 360 kilometres (220 mi) from Moscow. Smagino is the nearest rural locality.
