= Lukonino =

Lukonino Луконино
- Village
- Location within Ivanovo Oblast Location within Russia
- Coordinates: 57°04′N 42°57′E
- Country: Russia
- Region: Ivanovo Oblast
- District: Puchezhsky District
- Time zone: UTC+3:00

Lukonino (Russian: Луконино) is a rural locality (a village) in Puchezhsky District, Ivanovo Oblast, Russia. Population: 17 (2010 census);

== Geography ==
This rural locality is located 17 kilometres (11 mi) from Puchezh (the district's administrative centre), 121 kilometres (75 mi) from Ivanovo (capital of Ivanovo Oblast) and 355 kilometres (221 mi) from Moscow. Petrovo is the nearest rural locality.
