= Drozdikha =

Drozdikha Дроздиха
- Village
- Location within Ivanovo Oblast Location within Russia
- Coordinates: 57°07′N 43°00′E
- Country: Russia
- Region: Ivanovo Oblast
- District: Puchezhsky District
- Time zone: UTC+3:00

Drozdikha (Russian: Дроздиха) is a rural locality (a village) in Puchezhsky District, Ivanovo Oblast, Russia. Population: 154 (2010 census);

== Geography ==
This rural locality is located 19 kilometres (12 mi) from Puchezh (the district's administrative centre), 124 kilometres (77 mi) from Ivanovo (capital of Ivanovo Oblast) and 359 kilometres (223 mi) from Moscow. Bukharino is the nearest rural locality.
