= Lisikha =

Lisikha Лисиха
- Village
- Location within Ivanovo Oblast Location within Russia
- Coordinates: 56°54′N 42°55′E
- Country: Russia
- Region: Ivanovo Oblast
- District: Puchezhsky District
- Time zone: UTC+3:00

Lisikha (Russian: Лисиха) is a rural locality (a village) in Puchezhsky District, Ivanovo Oblast, Russia. Population: 9 (2010 census);

== Geography ==
This rural locality is located 16 kilometres (9.9 mi) from Puchezh (the district's administrative centre), 119 kilometres (74 mi) from Ivanovo (capital of Ivanovo Oblast) and 3,000 kilometres (1,900 mi) from Moscow. Luzhinki is the nearest rural locality.
