= Autel =

Autel may refer to:

- Autel Intelligent Technology (AIT), a Chinese electric vehicle charger manufacturer and operator
- Autel Robotics, a Chinese consumer and commercial aerial drone manufacturer, and former subsidiary of AIT
