= Zateikha =

Zateikha Затеиха
- Village
- Location within Ivanovo Oblast Location within Russia
- Coordinates: 56°57′N 42°52′E
- Country: Russia
- Region: Ivanovo Oblast
- District: Puchezhsky District
- Time zone: UTC+3:00

Zateikha (Russian: Затеиха) is a rural locality (a village) in Puchezhsky District, Ivanovo Oblast, Russia. Population: 485 (2010 census);

== Geography ==
This rural locality is located 18 kilometres (11 mi) from Puchezh (the district's administrative centre), 116 kilometres (72 mi) from Ivanovo (capital of Ivanovo Oblast) and 345 kilometres (214 mi) from Moscow. Polozikha is the nearest rural locality.
