= Stolbunikha =

Stolbunikha Столбуниха
- Village
- Location within Ivanovo Oblast Location within Russia
- Coordinates: 57°05′N 42°55′E
- Country: Russia
- Region: Ivanovo Oblast
- District: Puchezhsky District
- Time zone: UTC+3:00

Stolbunikha (Russian: Столбуниха) is a rural locality (a village) in Puchezhsky District, Ivanovo Oblast, Russia. Population: 7 (2010 census);

== Geography ==
This rural locality is located 19 kilometres (12 mi) from Puchezh (the district's administrative centre), 119 kilometres (74 mi) from Ivanovo (capital of Ivanovo Oblast) and 354 kilometres (220 mi) from Moscow. Listye is the nearest rural locality.
