= Melnichnoye =

Melnichnoye Мельничное
- Village
- Location within Ivanovo Oblast Location within Russia
- Coordinates: 56°55′N 43°03′E
- Country: Russia
- Region: Ivanovo Oblast
- District: Puchezhsky District
- Time zone: UTC+3:00

Melnichnoye (Russian: Мельничное) is a rural locality (a village) in Puchezhsky District, Ivanovo Oblast, Russia. Population: 51 (2010 census);

== Geography ==
This rural locality is located 9 kilometres (5.6 mi) from Puchezh (the district's administrative centre), 127 kilometres (79 mi) from Ivanovo (capital of Ivanovo Oblast) and 355 kilometres (221 mi) from Moscow. Voynovo is the nearest rural locality.
