= Puchezhsky =

Puchezhsky (masculine), Puchezhskaya (feminine), or Puchezhskoye (neuter) may refer to:

- Puchezhsky District, a district of Ivanovo Oblast, Russia
- Puchezhskoye Urban Settlement, a municipal formation which the town of Puchezh in Ivanovo Oblast, Russia is incorporated as
