= Deduslovo =

Deduslovo Дедуслово
- Village
- Location within Ivanovo Oblast Location within Russia
- Coordinates: 57°04′N 42°50′E
- Country: Russia
- Region: Ivanovo Oblast
- District: Puchezhsky District
- Time zone: UTC+3:00

Deduslovo (Russian: Дедуслово) is a rural locality (a village) in Puchezhsky District, Ivanovo Oblast, Russia. Population: 6 (2010 census);

== Geography ==
This rural locality is located 22 kilometres (14 mi) from Puchezh (the district's administrative centre), 113 kilometres (70 mi) from Ivanovo (capital of Ivanovo Oblast) and 347 kilometres (216 mi) from Moscow. Usovo is the nearest rural locality.
