= Pogorelka, Puchezhsky District, Ivanovo Oblast =

Pogorelka Погорелка
- Village
- Location within Ivanovo Oblast Location within Russia
- Coordinates: 56°58′N 43°06′E
- Country: Russia
- Region: Ivanovo Oblast
- District: Puchezhsky District
- Time zone: UTC+3:00

Pogorelka (Russian: Погорелка) is a rural locality (a village) in Puchezhsky District, Ivanovo Oblast, Russia. Population: 6 (2010 census);

== Geography ==
This rural locality is located 3 kilometres (1.9 mi) from Puchezh (the district's administrative centre), 130 kilometres (81 mi) from Ivanovo (capital of Ivanovo Oblast) and 359 kilometres (223 mi) from Moscow. Sivkovo is the nearest rural locality.
