= Chabyshevo Nizhneye =

Chabyshevo Nizhneye Чабышево Нижнее
- Village
- Location within Ivanovo Oblast Location within Russia
- Coordinates: 56°59′N 43°03′E
- Country: Russia
- Region: Ivanovo Oblast
- District: Puchezhsky District
- Time zone: UTC+3:00

Chabyshevo Nizhneye (Russian: Чабышево Нижнее) is a rural locality (a village) in Puchezhsky District, Ivanovo Oblast, Russia. Population: 10 (2010 census);

== Geography ==
This rural locality is located 7 kilometres (4.3 mi) from Puchezh (the district's administrative centre), 126 kilometres (78 mi) from Ivanovo (capital of Ivanovo Oblast) and 357 kilometres (222 mi) from Moscow. Chabyshevo Verkhneye is the nearest rural locality.
