= Korovayevo =

Korovayevo Короваево
- Village
- Location within Ivanovo Oblast Location within Russia
- Coordinates: 56°56′N 43°11′E
- Country: Russia
- Region: Ivanovo Oblast
- District: Puchezhsky District
- Time zone: UTC+3:00

Korovayevo (Russian: Короваево) is a rural locality (a village) in Puchezhsky District, Ivanovo Oblast, Russia. Population: 8 (2010 census);

== Geography ==
This rural locality is located 5 kilometres (3.1 mi) from Puchezh (the district's administrative centre), 135 kilometres (84 mi) from Ivanovo (capital of Ivanovo Oblast) and 362 kilometres (225 mi) from Moscow. Shchukino is the nearest rural locality.
