= Mortki =

Mortki Мортки
- Village
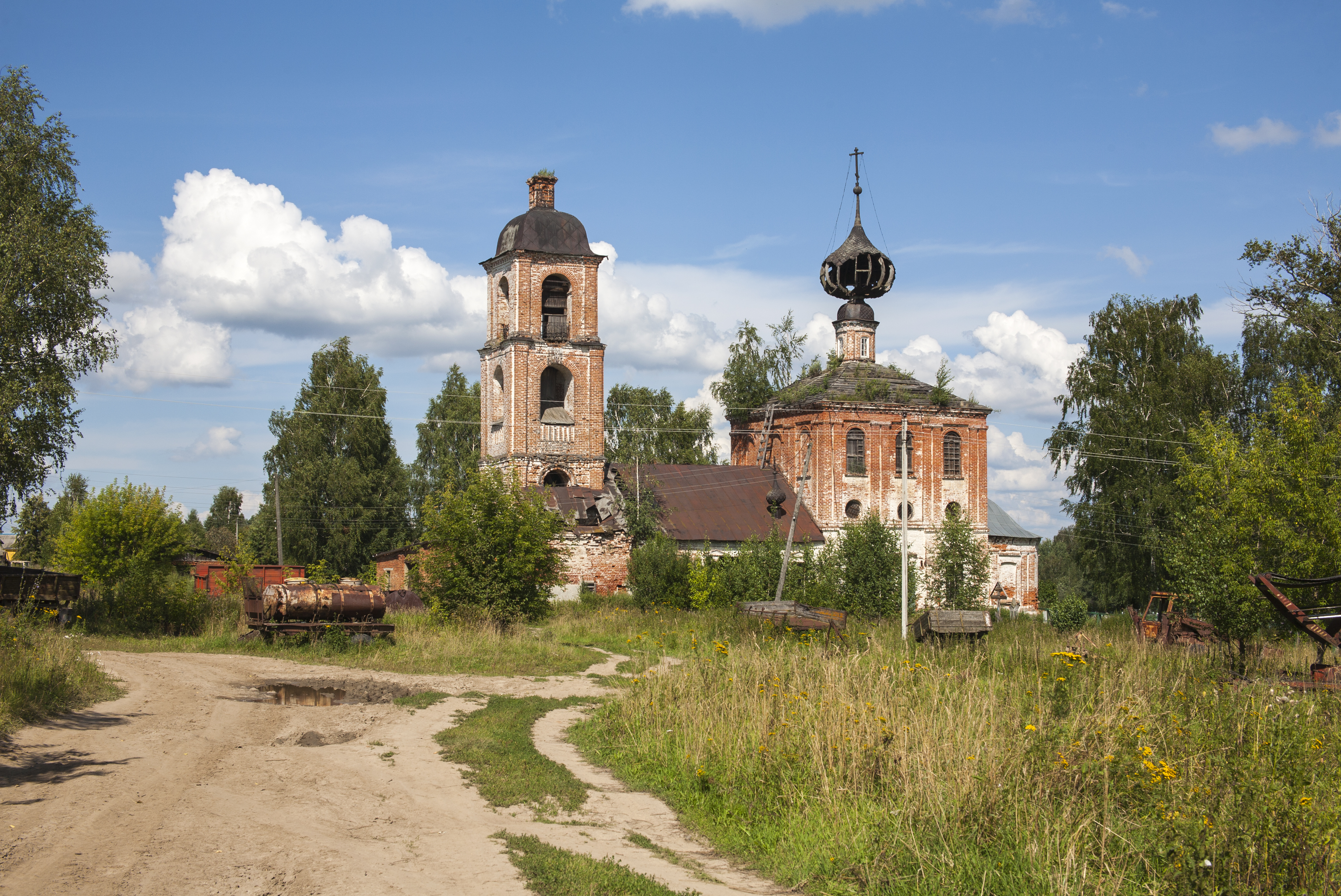
- Old buildings in Mortki

- Location within Ivanovo Oblast Location within Russia
- Coordinates: 56°51′N 43°06′E
- Country: Russia
- Region: Ivanovo Oblast
- District: Puchezhsky District
- Time zone: UTC+3:00

Mortki (Russian: Мортки) is a rural locality (a selo) in Puchezhsky District, Ivanovo Oblast, Russia. Population: 103 (2010 census);

== Geography ==
This rural locality is located 14 kilometres (8.7 mi) from Puchezh (the district's administrative centre), 131 kilometres (81 mi) from Ivanovo (capital of Ivanovo Oblast) and 356 kilometres (221 mi) from Moscow. Markovskaya is the nearest rural locality.
