= Privalovo =

Privalovo Привалово
- Village
- Location within Ivanovo Oblast Location within Russia
- Coordinates: 56°52′N 42°57′E
- Country: Russia
- Region: Ivanovo Oblast
- District: Puchezhsky District
- Time zone: UTC+3:00

Privalovo (Russian: Привалово) is a rural locality (a village) in Puchezhsky District, Ivanovo Oblast, Russia. Population: 109 (2010 census);

== Geography ==
This rural locality is located 18 kilometres (11 mi) from Puchezh (the district's administrative centre), 122 kilometres (76 mi) from Ivanovo (capital of Ivanovo Oblast) and 347 kilometres (216 mi) from Moscow. Pleshakovo is the nearest rural locality.
