= Luzhinki =

Luzhinki Лужинки
- Village
- Location within Ivanovo Oblast Location within Russia
- Coordinates: 56°55′N 42°55′E
- Country: Russia
- Region: Ivanovo Oblast
- District: Puchezhsky District
- Time zone: UTC+3:00

Luzhinki (Russian: Лужинки) is a rural locality (a selo) in Puchezhsky District, Ivanovo Oblast, Russia. Population: 200 (2010 census);

== Geography ==
This rural locality is located 17 kilometres (11 mi) from Puchezh (the district's administrative centre), 119 kilometres (74 mi) from Ivanovo (capital of Ivanovo Oblast) and 346 kilometres (215 mi) from Moscow. Lisikha is the nearest rural locality.
