= Lezhebokovo, Ivanovo Oblast =

Lezhebokovo Лежебоково
- Village
- Location within Ivanovo Oblast Location within Russia
- Coordinates: 57°00′N 42°52′E
- Country: Russia
- Region: Ivanovo Oblast
- District: Puchezhsky District
- Time zone: UTC+3:00

Lezhebokovo (Russian: Лежебоково) is a rural locality (a village) in Puchezhsky District, Ivanovo Oblast, Russia. Population: 17 (2010 census);

== Geography ==
This rural locality is located 18 kilometres (11 mi) from Puchezh (the district's administrative centre), 115 kilometres (71 mi) from Ivanovo (capital of Ivanovo Oblast) and 347 kilometres (216 mi) from Moscow. Dudino is the nearest rural locality.
