= Ivanikha, Puchezhsky District, Ivanovo Oblast =

Ivanikha Иваниха
- Village
- Location within Ivanovo Oblast Location within Russia
- Coordinates: 57°05′N 42°59′E
- Country: Russia
- Region: Ivanovo Oblast
- District: Puchezhsky District
- Time zone: UTC+3:00

Ivanikha (Russian: Иваниха) is a rural locality (a village) in Puchezhsky District, Ivanovo Oblast, Russia. Population: 8 (2010 census);

== Geography ==
This rural locality is located 17 kilometres (11 mi) from Puchezh (the district's administrative centre), 123 kilometres (76 mi) from Ivanovo (capital of Ivanovo Oblast) and 357 kilometres (222 mi) from Moscow. Pankratikha is the nearest rural locality.
