= Pauchikha =

Pauchikha Паучиха
- Village
- Location within Ivanovo Oblast Location within Russia
- Coordinates: 56°53′N 43°52′E
- Country: Russia
- Region: Ivanovo Oblast
- District: Puchezhsky District
- Time zone: UTC+3:00

Pauchikha (Russian: Паучиха) is a rural locality (a village) in Puchezhsky District, Ivanovo Oblast, Russia. Population: 20 (2010 census);

== Geography ==
This rural locality is located 20 kilometres (12 mi) from Puchezh (the district's administrative centre), 116 kilometres (72 mi) from Ivanovo (capital of Ivanovo Oblast) and 344 kilometres (214 mi) from Moscow. Vakhrino is the nearest rural locality.
