= Dmitriyevo Bolshoye =

Dmitriyevo Bolshoye Дмитриево Большое
- Village
- Location within Ivanovo Oblast Location within Russia
- Coordinates: 56°53′N 43°10′E
- Country: Russia
- Region: Ivanovo Oblast
- District: Puchezhsky District
- Time zone: UTC+3:00

Dmitriyevo Bolshoye (Russian: Дмитриево Большое) is a rural locality (a village) in Puchezhsky District, Ivanovo Oblast, Russia. Population: 205 (2010 census);

== Geography ==
This rural locality is located 10 kilometres (6.2 mi) from Puchezh (the district's administrative centre), 135 kilometres (84 mi) from Ivanovo (capital of Ivanovo Oblast) and 361 kilometres (224 mi) from Moscow. Lukinskaya is the nearest rural locality.
