= Marishchi =

Marishchi Марищи
- Village
- Location within Ivanovo Oblast Location within Russia
- Coordinates: 57°04′N 42°45′E
- Country: Russia
- Region: Ivanovo Oblast
- District: Puchezhsky District
- Time zone: UTC+3:00

Marishchi (Russian: Марищи) is a rural locality (a village) in Puchezhsky District, Ivanovo Oblast, Russia. Population: 134 (2010 census);

== Geography ==
This rural locality is located 27 kilometres (17 mi) from Puchezh (the district's administrative centre), 109 kilometres (68 mi) from Ivanovo (capital of Ivanovo Oblast) and 344 kilometres (214 mi) from Moscow. Podvigai is the nearest rural locality.
