= Lgovo, Ivanovo Oblast =

Lgovo Льгово
- Village
- Location within Ivanovo Oblast Location within Russia
- Coordinates: 56°57′N 43°11′E
- Country: Russia
- Region: Ivanovo Oblast
- District: Puchezhsky District
- Time zone: UTC+3:00

Lgovo (Russian: Льгово) is a rural locality (a village) in Puchezhsky District, Ivanovo Oblast, Russia. Population: 16 (2010 census);

== Geography ==
This rural locality is located 4 kilometres (2.5 mi) from Puchezh (the district's administrative centre), 135 kilometres (84 mi) from Ivanovo (capital of Ivanovo Oblast) and 363 kilometres (226 mi) from Moscow. Krupino is the nearest rural locality.
