= Sorvachevo =

Sorvachevo Сорвачево
- Village
- Location within Ivanovo Oblast Location within Russia
- Coordinates: 56°53′N 43°08′E
- Country: Russia
- Region: Ivanovo Oblast
- District: Puchezhsky District
- Time zone: UTC+3:00

Sorvachevo (Russian: Сорвачево) is a rural locality (a village) in Puchezhsky District, Ivanovo Oblast, Russia. Population: 12 (2010 census);

== Geography ==
This rural locality is located 9 kilometres (5.6 mi) from Puchezh (the district's administrative centre), 132 kilometres (82 mi) from Ivanovo (capital of Ivanovo Oblast) and 359 kilometres (223 mi) from Moscow. Bolsovo is the nearest rural locality.
