= Listye =

Listye Листье
- Village
- Location within Ivanovo Oblast Location within Russia
- Coordinates: 57°05′N 42°55′E
- Country: Russia
- Region: Ivanovo Oblast
- District: Puchezhsky District
- Time zone: UTC+3:00

Listye (Russian: Листье) is a rural locality (a selo) in Puchezhsky District, Ivanovo Oblast, Russia. Population: 200 (2010 census);

== Geography ==
This rural locality is located 18 kilometres (11 mi) from Puchezh (the district's administrative centre), 119 kilometres (74 mi) from Ivanovo (capital of Ivanovo Oblast) and 354 kilometres (220 mi) from Moscow. Stolbunikha is the nearest rural locality.
