= Rassadino =

Rassadino Рассадино
- Village
- Location within Ivanovo Oblast Location within Russia
- Coordinates: 56°58′N 42°57′E
- Country: Russia
- Region: Ivanovo Oblast
- District: Puchezhsky District
- Time zone: UTC+3:00

Rassadino (Russian: Рассадино) is a rural locality (a village) in Puchezhsky District, Ivanovo Oblast, Russia. Population: 12 (2010 census);

== Geography ==
This rural locality is located 13 kilometres (8.1 mi) from Puchezh (the district's administrative centre), 121 kilometres (75 mi) from Ivanovo (capital of Ivanovo Oblast) and 351 kilometres (218 mi) from Moscow. Poselikhino is the nearest rural locality.
