= Likhunikha =

Likhunikha Лихуниха
- Village
- Location within Ivanovo Oblast Location within Russia
- Coordinates: 56°57′N 43°07′E
- Country: Russia
- Region: Ivanovo Oblast
- District: Puchezhsky District
- Time zone: UTC+3:00

Likhunikha (Russian: Лихуниха) is a rural locality (a village) in Puchezhsky District, Ivanovo Oblast, Russia. Population: 18 (2010 census);

== Geography ==
This rural locality is located 3 kilometres (1.9 mi) from Puchezh (the district's administrative centre), 131 kilometres (81 mi) from Ivanovo (capital of Ivanovo Oblast) and 360 kilometres (220 mi) from Moscow. Pogorelka is the nearest rural locality.
