= Sivkovo, Ivanovo Oblast =

Sivkovo Сивково
- Village
- Location within Ivanovo Oblast Location within Russia
- Coordinates: 56°58′N 43°06′E
- Country: Russia
- Region: Ivanovo Oblast
- District: Puchezhsky District
- Time zone: UTC+3:00

Sivkovo (Russian: Сивково) is a rural locality (a village) in Puchezhsky District, Ivanovo Oblast, Russia. Population: 10 (2010 census);

== Geography ==
This rural locality is located 4 kilometres (2.5 mi) from Puchezh (the district's administrative centre), 129 kilometres (80 mi) from Ivanovo (capital of Ivanovo Oblast) and 359 kilometres (223 mi) from Moscow. Pogorelka is the nearest rural locality.
