= Savikha =

Savikha Савиха
- Village
- Location within Ivanovo Oblast Location within Russia
- Coordinates: 56°57′N 42°51′E
- Country: Russia
- Region: Ivanovo Oblast
- District: Puchezhsky District
- Time zone: UTC+3:00

Savikha (Russian: Савиха) is a rural locality (a village) in Puchezhsky District, Ivanovo Oblast, Russia. Population: 12 (2010 census);

== Geography ==
This rural locality is located 19 kilometres (12 mi) from Puchezh (the district's administrative centre), 115 kilometres (71 mi) from Ivanovo (capital of Ivanovo Oblast) and 344 kilometres (214 mi) from Moscow. Medvedki is the nearest rural locality.
