= Gusarinki =

Gusarinki Гусаринки
- Village
- Location within Ivanovo Oblast Location within Russia
- Coordinates: 56°57′N 43°01′E
- Country: Russia
- Region: Ivanovo Oblast
- District: Puchezhsky District
- Time zone: UTC+3:00

Gusarinki (Russian: Гусаринки) is a rural locality (a village) in Puchezhsky District, Ivanovo Oblast, Russia. Population: 12 (2010 census);

== Geography ==
This rural locality is located 8 kilometres (5.0 mi) from Puchezh (the district's administrative centre), 125 kilometres (78 mi) from Ivanovo (capital of Ivanovo Oblast) and 354 kilometres (220 mi) from Moscow. Kuzminskaya is the nearest rural locality.
