= Baskino =

Baskino Баскино
- Village
- Location within Ivanovo Oblast Location within Russia
- Coordinates: 56°53′N 43°03′E
- Country: Russia
- Region: Ivanovo Oblast
- District: Puchezhsky District
- Time zone: UTC+3:00

Baskino (Russian: Баскино) is a rural locality (a village) in Puchezhsky District, Ivanovo Oblast, Russia. Population: 16 (2010 census);

== Geography ==
This rural locality is located 12 kilometres (7.5 mi) from Puchezh (the district's administrative centre), 127 kilometres (79 mi) from Ivanovo (capital of Ivanovo Oblast) and 353 kilometres (219 mi) from Moscow. Sapozhki is the nearest rural locality.
