= Shpenevo =

Shpenevo Шпенево
- Village
- Location within Ivanovo Oblast Location within Russia
- Coordinates: 57°02′N 42°45′E
- Country: Russia
- Region: Ivanovo Oblast
- District: Puchezhsky District
- Time zone: UTC+3:00

Shpenevo (Russian: Шпенево) is a rural locality (a village) in Puchezhsky District, Ivanovo Oblast, Russia. Population: 5 (2010 census);

== Geography ==
This rural locality is located 25 kilometres (16 mi) from Puchezh (the district's administrative centre), 109 kilometres (68 mi) from Ivanovo (capital of Ivanovo Oblast) and 343 kilometres (213 mi) from Moscow. Kulizhovo is the nearest rural locality.
