= Pleshakovo =

Pleshakovo Плешаково
- Village
- Location within Ivanovo Oblast Location within Russia
- Coordinates: 56°51′N 42°57′E
- Country: Russia
- Region: Ivanovo Oblast
- District: Puchezhsky District
- Time zone: UTC+3:00

Pleshakovo (Russian: Плешаково) is a rural locality (a village) in Puchezhsky District, Ivanovo Oblast, Russia. Population: 13 (2010 census);

== Geography ==
This rural locality is located 18 kilometres (11 mi) from Puchezh (the district's administrative centre), 122 kilometres (76 mi) from Ivanovo (capital of Ivanovo Oblast) and 348 kilometres (216 mi) from Moscow. Privalovo is the nearest rural locality.
