= Umekovo =

Umekovo Умеково
- Village
- Location within Ivanovo Oblast Location within Russia
- Coordinates: 56°54′N 43°03′E
- Country: Russia
- Region: Ivanovo Oblast
- District: Puchezhsky District
- Time zone: UTC+3:00

Umekovo (Russian: Умеково) is a rural locality (a village) in Puchezhsky District, Ivanovo Oblast, Russia. Population: 10 (2010 census);

== Geography ==
This rural locality is located 10 kilometres (6.2 mi) from Puchezh (the district's administrative centre), 128 kilometres (80 mi) from Ivanovo (capital of Ivanovo Oblast) and 355 kilometres (221 mi) from Moscow. Lodygino is the nearest rural locality.
