= Segot =

Segot Сеготь
- Village
- Location within Ivanovo Oblast Location within Russia
- Coordinates: 57°05′N 43°00′E
- Country: Russia
- Region: Ivanovo Oblast
- District: Puchezhsky District
- Time zone: UTC+3:00

Segot (Russian: Сеготь) is a rural locality (a selo) in Puchezhsky District, Ivanovo Oblast, Russia. Population: 464 (2010 census);

== Geography ==
This rural locality is located 15 kilometres (9.3 mi) from Puchezh (the district's administrative centre), 124 kilometres (77 mi) from Ivanovo (capital of Ivanovo Oblast) and 358 kilometres (222 mi) from Moscow. Belyayevo is the nearest rural locality.
