= Protasikha Bolshaya =

Protasikha Bolshaya Протасиха
- Village
- Location within Ivanovo Oblast Location within Russia
- Coordinates: 56°55′N 43°04′E
- Country: Russia
- Region: Ivanovo Oblast
- District: Puchezhsky District
- Time zone: UTC+3:00

Protasikha Bolshaya (Russian: Протасиха) is a rural locality (a village) in Puchezhsky District, Ivanovo Oblast, Russia. Population: 12 (2010 census);

== Geography ==
This rural locality is located 7 kilometres (4.3 mi) from Puchezh (the district's administrative centre), 129 kilometres (80 mi) from Ivanovo (capital of Ivanovo Oblast) and 356 kilometres (221 mi) from Moscow. Melnichnoye is the nearest rural locality.
