= Mostovka, Ivanovo Oblast =

Mostovka Мостовка
- Village
- Location within Ivanovo Oblast Location within Russia
- Coordinates: 56°58′N 43°08′E
- Country: Russia
- Region: Ivanovo Oblast
- District: Puchezhsky District
- Time zone: UTC+3:00

Mostovka (Russian: Мостовка) is a rural locality (a village) in Puchezhsky District, Ivanovo Oblast, Russia. Population: 17 (2010 census);

== Geography ==
This rural locality is located 2 kilometres (1.2 mi) from Puchezh (the district's administrative centre), 131 kilometres (81 mi) from Ivanovo (capital of Ivanovo Oblast) and 361 kilometres (224 mi) from Moscow. Kosopalikha is the nearest rural locality.
