= Boafo =

Boafo is a surname. Notable people with the surname include:

- Adrian Boafo (born 1994), American politician
- Amoako Boafo (born 1984), Ghanaian painter and visual artist
- John Boafo, Ghanaian rower
- Kwabena Boafo (born 1977), Ghanaian footballer
- Nicholas Yaw Boafo Adade (1927–2013), Ghanaian judge
- Paul Boafo, Ghanaian theologian and minister
