= Galashino, Puchezhsky District, Ivanovo Oblast =

Galashino Галашино
- Village
- Location within Ivanovo Oblast Location within Russia
- Coordinates: 56°53′N 43°12′E
- Country: Russia
- Region: Ivanovo Oblast
- District: Puchezhsky District
- Time zone: UTC+3:00

Galashino (Russian: Галашино) is a rural locality (a village) in Puchezhsky District, Ivanovo Oblast, Russia. Population: 8 (2010 census);

== Geography ==
This rural locality is located 11 kilometres (6.8 mi) from Puchezh (the district's administrative centre), 136 kilometres (85 mi) from Ivanovo (capital of Ivanovo Oblast) and 362 kilometres (225 mi) from Moscow. Yelino is the nearest rural locality.
