= Repino Maloye =

Repino Maloye Репино Малое
- Village
- Location within Ivanovo Oblast Location within Russia
- Coordinates: 56°59′N 43°05′E
- Country: Russia
- Region: Ivanovo Oblast
- District: Puchezhsky District
- Time zone: UTC+3:00

Repino Maloye (Russian: Репино Малое) is a rural locality (a village) in Puchezhsky District, Ivanovo Oblast, Russia. Population: 6 (2010 census);

== Geography ==
This rural locality is located 5 kilometres (3.1 mi) from Puchezh (the district's administrative centre), 128 kilometres (80 mi) from Ivanovo (capital of Ivanovo Oblast) and 359 kilometres (223 mi) from Moscow. Anisimikha is the nearest rural locality.
