= Povalikhino =

Povalikhino Повалихино
- Village
- Location within Ivanovo Oblast Location within Russia
- Coordinates: 57°00′N 43°06′E
- Country: Russia
- Region: Ivanovo Oblast
- District: Puchezhsky District
- Time zone: UTC+3:00

Povalikhino (Russian: Повалихино) is a rural locality (a village) in Puchezhsky District, Ivanovo Oblast, Russia. Population: 5 (2010 census);

== Geography ==
This rural locality is located 4 kilometres (2.5 mi) from Puchezh (the district's administrative centre), 129 kilometres (80 mi) from Ivanovo (capital of Ivanovo Oblast) and 360 kilometres (220 mi) from Moscow. Devkina Gora is the nearest rural locality.
