= Kameshki Bolshiye =

Kameshki Bolshiye Камешки Большие
- Village
- Location within Ivanovo Oblast Location within Russia
- Coordinates: 57°05′N 42°47′E
- Country: Russia
- Region: Ivanovo Oblast
- District: Puchezhsky District
- Time zone: UTC+3:00

Kameshki Bolshiye (Russian: Камешки Большие) is a rural locality (a village) in Puchezhsky District, Ivanovo Oblast, Russia. Population: 18 (2010 census);

== Geography ==
This rural locality is located 26 kilometres (16 mi) from Puchezh (the district's administrative centre), 110 kilometres (68 mi) from Ivanovo (capital of Ivanovo Oblast) and 346 kilometres (215 mi) from Moscow. Penki is the nearest rural locality.
