= Kandaurovo =

Kandaurovo Кандаурово
- Village
- Location within Ivanovo Oblast Location within Russia
- Coordinates: 56°52′N 43°01′E
- Country: Russia
- Region: Ivanovo Oblast
- District: Puchezhsky District
- Time zone: UTC+3:00

Kandaurovo (Russian: Кандаурово) is a rural locality (a selo) in Puchezhsky District, Ivanovo Oblast, Russia. Population: 209 (2010 census);

== Geography ==
This rural locality is located 14 kilometres (8.7 mi) from Puchezh (the district's administrative centre), 126 kilometres (78 mi) from Ivanovo (capital of Ivanovo Oblast) and 352 kilometres (219 mi) from Moscow. Sapozhki is the nearest rural locality.
