= RC Store =

Ukrainian company

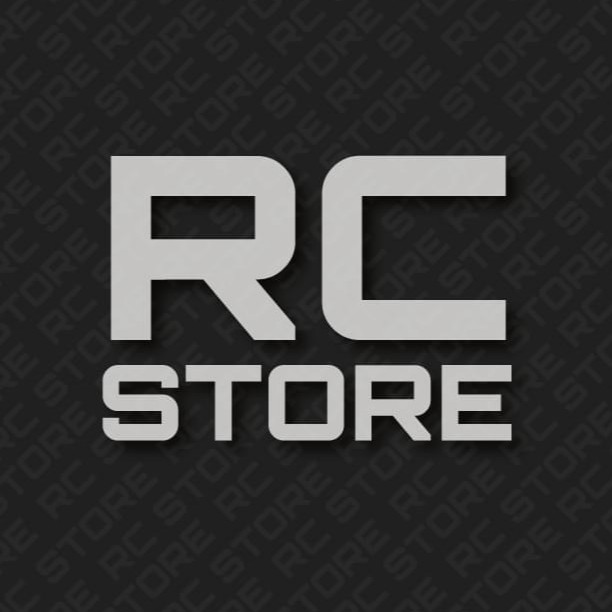
- Type: Limited liability company
- Founded: 2016 in Kyiv, Ukraine
- Founder: Tymofii Soloviov
- Headquarters: Kyiv, Ukraine
- Products: radio-controlled devices
- Website: rc-store.com.ua

RC STORE (legal name: RC STORE LLC) — is a Ukrainian company specializing in the sale of FPV drones, accessories, radio-controlled vehicles, and related equipment, as well as in engineering education and the production of combat drones. The company is headquartered in Kyiv. It has been operating in the Ukrainian market since 2016; its founder is Tymofii Soloviov.

== History ==
Since 2016 Soloviov has been working with volunteers and military personnel who participated in combat operations in the east of Ukraine in the Joint Forces Operation zone. Soloviov invested 1.5 million hryvnia in the production of FPV drones in Ukraine, in particular carbon frames and other components. In 2023, he registered RC Store, a company specializing in the import and sale of quadcopters and UAVs.

In 2017, Soloviov received the status of an official DJI drone dealer in Ukraine. He introduced AUTEL drones, but this venture did not bring the expected results.

== Russo-Ukrainian war (2022–present) ==
However, during the Russian full-scale invasion, the AUTEL drones replaced drones that posed a threat to Ukrainian pilots due to the possibility of them being tracked by the enemy. During their active spread in America, Soloviov decided to implement them in Ukraine as well, signing contracts with the manufacturers, such as BETAFPV, GEPRC, and others. Their ready-made training kits made it easier for beginners to get started and created a lot of popularity and excitement through video reviews on YouTube.

Since early 2023, Soloviev has been working on training drones for the military, which have become an important tool for training FPV drone operators in military schools such as Boriviter, Victory Drones, and Global Drone. In August 2025, he announced a new development of FPV drones capable of functioning effectively in conditions of active electronic warfare (EW). According to him, these drones "adapt to signal interference, which significantly reduces the impact of EW and increases the chance of successfully hitting targets."

Major Ukrainian television channels, including ICTV, reported on the activities of Soloviov and his FPV-drones company RC Store. As of 2024, Soloviov is developing his own video transmitters, video receivers, and controllers, which are planned to be launched into serial production at a cost no higher than in China. Global leaders in FPV drone brands have recognized his company as their No. 1 customer for the purchase of FPV spectrum mechanisms in 2024 — Ukraine has overtaken the US in terms of purchases and has become the largest customer.

== Financial indicators ==
According to Forbes, in 2024, the revenue of RC Store, a company specializing in the production and sale of FPV drones, amounted to UAH 200 million.

== Awards ==
In 2025, RC Store was included in the "NEXT 250" Forbes Ukraine rating — a list of the most promising small and medium-sized companies in Ukraine, whose participants, according to the editorial board, have a good chance of breaking into the higher business league.
