= Dvoynichikha =

Dvoynichikha Двойничиха
- Village
- Location within Ivanovo Oblast Location within Russia
- Coordinates: 56°52′N 42°56′E
- Country: Russia
- Region: Ivanovo Oblast
- District: Puchezhsky District
- Time zone: UTC+3:00

Dvoynichikha (Russian: Двойничиха) is a rural locality (a village) in Puchezhsky District, Ivanovo Oblast, Russia. Population: 10 (2010 census);

== Geography ==
This rural locality is located 18 kilometres (11 mi) from Puchezh (the district's administrative centre), 120 kilometres (75 mi) from Ivanovo (capital of Ivanovo Oblast) and 346 kilometres (215 mi) from Moscow. Ushibikha is the nearest rural locality.
