= Mekhovo =

Mekhovo Мехово
- Village
- Location within Ivanovo Oblast Location within Russia
- Coordinates: 56°54′N 43°06′E
- Country: Russia
- Region: Ivanovo Oblast
- District: Puchezhsky District
- Time zone: UTC+3:00

Mekhovo (Russian: Мехово) is a rural locality (a village) in Puchezhsky District, Ivanovo Oblast, Russia. Population: 12 (2010 census);

== Geography ==
This rural locality is located 9 kilometres (5.6 mi) from Puchezh (the district's administrative centre), 131 kilometres (81 mi) from Ivanovo (capital of Ivanovo Oblast) and 357 kilometres (222 mi) from Moscow. Yachmen is the nearest rural locality.
