= Klimushino Bolshoye =

Klimushino Bolshoye Климушино Большое
- Village
- Location within Ivanovo Oblast Location within Russia
- Coordinates: 56°58′N 43°08′E
- Country: Russia
- Region: Ivanovo Oblast
- District: Puchezhsky District
- Time zone: UTC+3:00

Klimushino Bolshoye (Russian: Климушино Большое) is a rural locality (a village) in Puchezhsky District, Ivanovo Oblast, Russia. Population: 188 (2010 census);

== Geography ==
This rural locality is located 1 kilometre (0.62 mi) from Puchezh (the district's administrative centre), 132 kilometres (82 mi) from Ivanovo (capital of Ivanovo Oblast) and 361 kilometres (224 mi) from Moscow. Mostovka is the nearest rural locality.
