= Vasilkovo, Puchezhsky District, Ivanovo Oblast =

Vasilkovo Васильково
- Village
- Location within Ivanovo Oblast Location within Russia
- Coordinates: 57°01′N 43°04′E
- Country: Russia
- Region: Ivanovo Oblast
- District: Puchezhsky District
- Time zone: UTC+3:00

Vasilkovo (Russian: Васильково) is a rural locality (a village) in Puchezhsky District, Ivanovo Oblast, Russia. Population: 9 (2010 census);

== Geography ==
This rural locality is located 7 kilometres (4.3 mi) from Puchezh (the district's administrative centre), 127 kilometres (79 mi) from Ivanovo (capital of Ivanovo Oblast) and 359 kilometres (223 mi) from Moscow. Koshelevo is the nearest rural locality.
