= Korablyovo =

Korablyovo Кораблёво
- Village
- Location within Ivanovo Oblast Location within Russia
- Coordinates: 56°55′N 42°58′E
- Country: Russia
- Region: Ivanovo Oblast
- District: Puchezhsky District
- Time zone: UTC+3:00

Korablyovo (Russian: Кораблёво) is a rural locality (a village) in Puchezhsky District, Ivanovo Oblast, Russia. Population: 178 (2010 census);

== Geography ==
This rural locality is located 13 kilometres (8.1 mi) from Puchezh (the district's administrative centre), 122 kilometres (76 mi) from Ivanovo (capital of Ivanovo Oblast) and 350 kilometres (220 mi) from Moscow. Vzglyadovo is the nearest rural locality.
