= Ilya-Vysokovo =

Ilya-Vysokovo Илья-Высоково
- Village
- Location within Ivanovo Oblast Location within Russia
- Coordinates: 56°56′N 43°02′E
- Country: Russia
- Region: Ivanovo Oblast
- District: Puchezhsky District
- Time zone: UTC+3:00

Ilya-Vysokovo (Russian: Илья-Высоково) is a rural locality (a selo) in Puchezhsky District, Ivanovo Oblast, Russia. Population: 674 (2010 census);

== Geography ==
This rural locality is located 9 kilometres (5.6 mi) from Puchezh (the district's administrative centre), 126 kilometres (78 mi) from Ivanovo (capital of Ivanovo Oblast) and 354 kilometres (220 mi) from Moscow. Shubino is the nearest rural locality.
