= Pauvert =

Pauvert is a surname. Notable people with the surname include:

- Jean-Jacques Pauvert (1926–2014), French publisher
- Sébastien Pauvert (born 1977), French football player
