= Gridnev =

Gridnev (masculine, Russian: Гриднев) or Gridneva (feminine, Russian: Гриднева) is a Russian surname. Notable people with the surname include:

- Aleksei Gridnev (born 1977), Russian soccer player
- Daniil Gridnev (born 1986), Russian soccer player
- Valeriy Gridnev (born 1956), Russian–English portrait painter
