= Ssali =

Ssali is a surname. Notable people with the surname include:

- Godfrey Ssali (born 1977), Ugandan footballer
- Jaberi Bidandi Ssali (born 1937), Ugandan politician
- Joseph Ssali (1967–2003), Ugandan sprinter
- Sarah Ssali (born 1971), Ugandan social scientist
- Shaka Ssali (1953–2025), Ugandan-born American journalist

== See also ==
- Geraldine Ssali Busuulwa, Ugandan accountant
