= Nihat =

Nihat is a Turkish given name for males. It means "legacy". People named Nihat include:

- Ali Nihat Yazıcı (born 1964), Turkish chess official
- Nihat Akbay (1945–2020), Turkish footballer
- Nihat Akdoğan (born 1980), Turkish politician
- Nihat Altınkaya (born 1979), Turkish actor
- Nihat Anılmış (1876–1954), Ottoman army officer and Turkish general
- Nihat Baştürk (born 1973), Turkish footballer
- Nihat Bekdik (1902–1972), Turkish footballer
- Nihat Berker (born 1949), Turkish theoretical physicist
- Nihat Doğan (born 1976), musical artist
- Nihat Ergün (born 1962), Turkish politician and government minister
- Nihat Erim (1912–1980), Turkish politician and journalist
- Nihat Eski (born 1963), Turkish-Dutch politician
- Nihat Genç (1956–2025), Turkish journalist and writer
- Nihat Hatipoğlu (born 1955), Turkish academic and theologian
- Nihat Kahveci (born 1979), Turkish footballer
- Nihat Mammadli (born 2002), Azerbaijani Greco-Roman wrestler
- Nihat Nikerel (1950–2009), Turkish actor
- Nihat Emre Numanbayraktaroğlu (born 1977), Turkish football player
- Nihat Odabaşı (born 1968), Turkish fashion photographer
- Nihat Özdemir (born 1950), Turkish businessman
- Nihat Şahin (born 1989), Turkish footballer
- Nihat Türkmenoğlu (born 1988), Turkish opara archer
- Nihat Yeşil (born 1957), Turkish politician
- Nihat Zeybekci (born 1961), Turkish economist, politician and government minister

== See also ==
- Nihad
- Nihatu
