= Zaraysky =

Zaraysky (masculine), Zarayskaya (feminine), or Zarayskoye (neuter) may refer to:

- Zaraysky District, a district of Moscow Oblast, Russia
- Zaraysky (inhabited locality) (Zarayskaya, Zarayskoye), name of several rural localities in Russia
