= Zaraysky (inhabited locality) =

Zaraysky (Russian: Зарайский; masculine), Zarayskaya (Зарайская; feminine), or Zarayskoye (Зарайское; neuter) is the name of several rural localities in Russia:

- Zaraysky (rural locality), a settlement in Karinskoye Rural Settlement of Zaraysky District of Moscow Oblast
- Zarayskoye, Ivanovo Oblast, a selo in Puchezhsky District of Ivanovo Oblast
- Zarayskoye, Tver Oblast, a khutor in Maksatikhinsky District of Tver Oblast
