= Nihad =

Nihad is an Arabic masculine given name. Notable people with the name are as follows:

- Nihad Awad, American executive director
- Nihad Đedović, Bosnian basketball player
- Nihad Haj Moustafa, Syrian football player
- Nihad Hasanović, Bosnian writer
- Nihad Hrustanbegovic, Bosnian-Dutch composer
- Ahmed Nihad, Pretender to the Ottoman throne
- Nihad Nusseibeh (1926–1999), Palestinian military engineer and Fatah member
- Nihad Quliyev, Azerbaijani footballer

== See also ==
- Nihat, list of people with a similar given name
