= Ayedonitsky =

Ayedonitsky (Russian: Аедони́цкий; masculine) or Ayedonitskaya (Аедони́цкая; feminine) is a Russian last name. It is a Russian surname originated in clergy, artificially created from the Latin word aedon, meaning nightingale and was given in Russian Orthodox seminaries either to students who sang well in a choir or as a Latin translation of the Russian last name Solovyov.
