= Alexey Soloviev =

Alexey Soloviev (also Aleksei or Soloviev) may refer to the following Russian people:

- Alexey Soloviev (boxer) (born 1973)
- Aleksei Solovyov (footballer) (born 1996)
- Alexei Soloviev (ice dancer) (born 1964)
