= Lorenzo Mathiot =

Seychellois footballer

Lorenzo Mathiot (born June 13, 1977) is a Seychellois footballer. He played as a defender on the Seychelles national football team from 2002 to 2008.
