= Aleksei Peplov =

Russian footballer

Personal information
- Full name: Aleksei Pavlovich Peplov
- Date of birth: 5 January 1977 (age 49)
- Height: 1.84 m (6 ft 1/2 in)
- Position: Forward

Senior career*
Years	Team	Apps	(Gls)
1995–1996	FC Kolos Krasnodar	18	(2)
1995	→ FC Kolos-2 Krasnodar (loan)	12	(0)
1995	→ FC Druzhba Vyselki (loan)		
1996–1998	FC Rostselmash Rostov-on-Don	2	(0)
1996–1998	→ FC Rostselmash-2 Rostov-on-Don (loans)	59	(6)
1999	FC Kuban Krasnodar	10	(0)
1999	FC Neftyanik Kubani Goryachy Klyuch		
2001	FC Torpedo-Viktoriya Nizhny Novgorod	16	(0)
2001	FC Neftyanik Kubani Goryachy Klyuch		
- * Club domestic league appearances and goals

Aleksei Pavlovich Peplov (Russian: Алексей Павлович Пеплов; born 5 January 1977) is a former Russian football player.
