= Autel Intelligent Technology =

Chinese electric vehicle charger manufacturer and operator

- Traded as: SSE: 688208
- ISIN: CNE100003RF2
- Founder: 2004; 22 years ago
- Headquarters: Shenzhen, China
- Area served: Worldwide
- Revenue: CN¥ 4.62 billion (2026)
- Net income: CN¥ 833 million (2026)
- Number of employees: 2,700+ (2026)
- Subsidiaries: Autel Africa; Autel US; Autel Automotive Intelligence
- Website: autelenergy.com

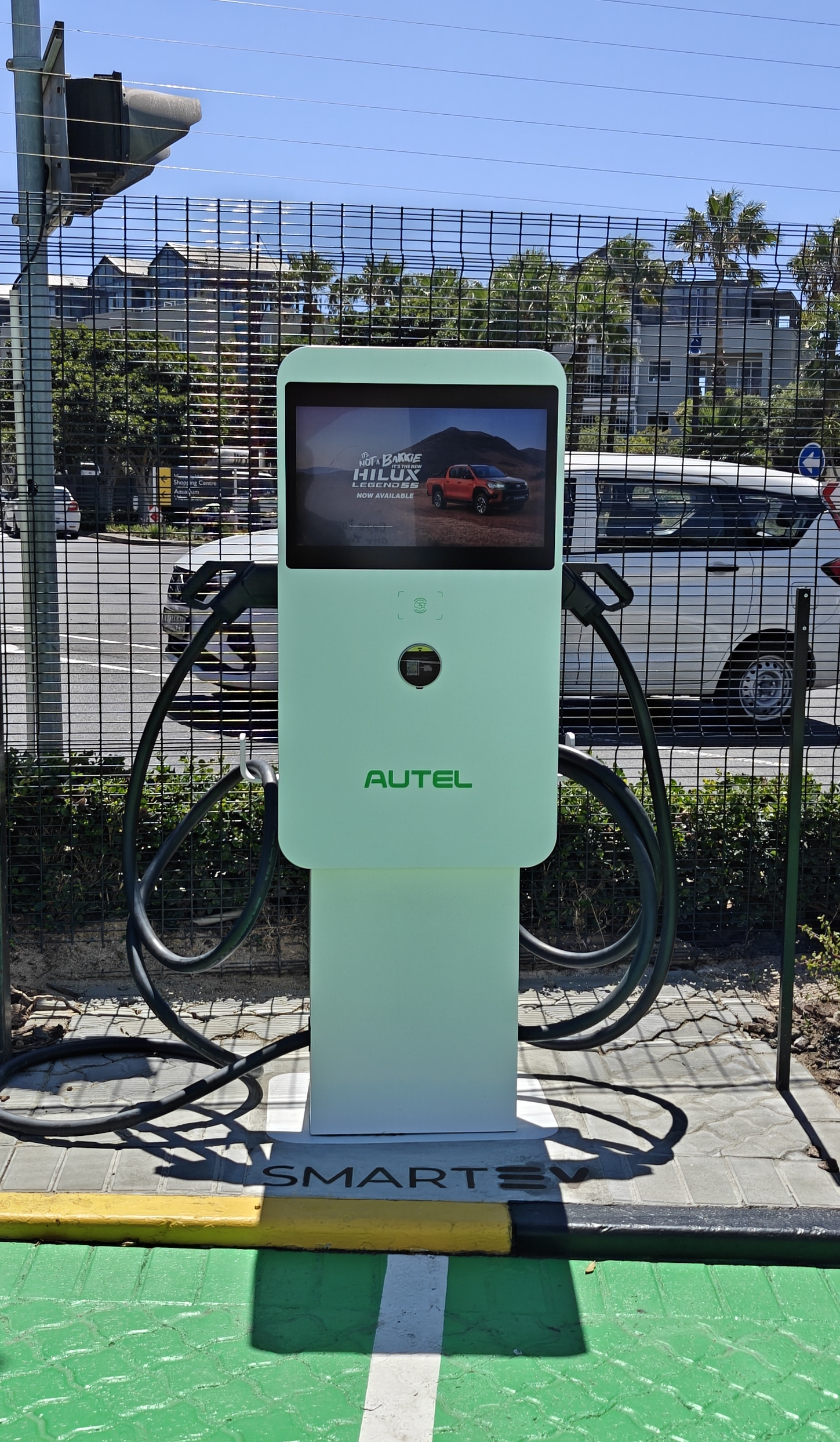
Autel public charging station at the Toyota Cape Town City dealership

Autel Intelligent Technology (AIT) is a Chinese electric vehicle technology company. It specializes in the R&D, production, sales, and service of smart charging systems, automotive advanced diagnostic, detection and testing systems, and electronic components.

Founded in 2004, the company is headquartered in Shenzhen, China, with operations across 84 countries as of 2026.

== History ==
Autel was founded in 2004.

In October 2020, AIT went public, with a total market cap of CN¥ 1.21 billion. Before the IPO, subsidiary Autel Robotics, which manufactures consumer and commercial aerial drones, was spun off.

In September 2023, Autel launched the Autel Energy Innovation Center in Anaheim, California, USA. The facility would serve as Autel's new research and development campus, where original equipment manufacturers (OEMs) and commercial partners could test the integration of third-party products with Autel Energy hardware and software, before entering the market.

In October 2023, the company announced that it would begin production of its 180kw–240kw DC fast MaxiCharger at its Greensboro, North Carolina, USA plant later that same month. The company stated that it had set an annual production target of up to 5,000 chargers from the Greensboro facility. This followed Autel doing significant renovations to the plant after it acquired the facility in May 2023.

The MaxiCharger was confirmed to comply with the US' National Electric Vehicle Infrastructure (NEVI) funding program - a segment of the Infrastructure Investment and Jobs Act, and provides comprehensive charging data collection as part of NEVI compliance.

At Consumer Electronics Show (CES) in January 2025, Autel showcased the latest iteration of its Cloud Platform, which included new payment methods for charging users. At the same event, Autel showcased its new Series Charger platform, which was built to include a unified modular design, to serve individual and large-scale charging sites.

At the 2026 CES event, AIT launched its Avant family of products, aimed at fleet depots, logistics hubs, and autonomous vehicle operations. The products focus on automated vehicle plug-in, as well as routine equipment diagnostics and preventative maintenance of charging infrastructure.

Autel CTO Shane Long confirmed at the event that the company's latest products were designed to support open standards, including OCPP and ISO 15118, which will enable customers to choose their preferred charging management software. He said the EV charging industry no longer needs proprietary silos, and that customers are asking for choice when it comes to their EV charging.

== Operations ==
AIT develops, manufactures, and operates electric vehicle charging stations of various kinds, including DC fast chargers and AC chargers. The company also produces EV charging software in the form of an Autel Charge mobile app, as well as its Charging Station Management System (CSMS), Payment Kiosk, and Edge Gateway software solutions.

The company also provides automotive diagnostics and testing products, TPMS and ADAS products, as well as related software cloud solutions.

As of 2026, Autel has operations across 84 countries, with a total of over 256,000 electric vehicle chargers. That same year, AIT had delivered over 1.12 trillion kWh of energy via its charging stations, constituting a CO2 reduction of over 372,000 tons.

Outside of China (where AIT's headquarters are located), the company maintains regional offices in 7 countries.

=== Autel Africa ===
Through its Autel Africa subsidiary, AIT has become a major player in the South African EV infrastructure space. Autel has installed 100 DC fast chargers (120 kW) for one of Cape Town's two major bus operators, Golden Arrow. The operator is shifting towards electric buses, and has installed Autel chargers at its Arrowgate depot.

Autel has also partnered with Toyota South Africa to install public chargers (22 kW) at dealerships across the country. As of 2026, a total of 119 such chargers had been rolled out.

== Corporate social responsibility ==
Some of Autel's charging networks use renewable energy by integrating photovoltaic panels and energy storage into its charging stations.

== See also ==
- Electric vehicles
- Plug-in electric vehicles
- Environmental sustainability
