= Tebogo Mothusi =

Motswana footballer

Personal information
- Full name: Tebogo Mothusi
- Date of birth: 20 October 1977 (age 49)
- Place of birth: Botswana
- Position: Midfielder

Senior career*
Years	Team	Apps	(Gls)
2002-2008	TASC FC		
2007-2012	Mogoditshane Fighters		
2011-2012	Township Rollers F.C.		

International career
2003–2005	Botswana	12	(0)
- * Club domestic league appearances and goals

Tebogo Mothusi (born 20 October 1977) is a Motswana footballer. Between 2003 and 2005, he played for the Botswana national football team.
