= Mikhail Solovyov =

Mikhail Solovyov may refer to:

- Mikhail Solovyov (footballer, born 1968), Russian football player and coach
- Mikhail Solovyov (footballer, born 1997), Russian football player
- Mikhail Solovyov (lieutenant) (1917–1943), Red Army lieutenant
