= Alexander Solovyov =

Alexander Solovyov (last name alternatively transliterated Solovyev or Soloviev, and first name is often spelled as Aleksandr) may refer to:

- Alexander Soloviev (historian) (1890–1971), Russian émigré Slavist
- Alexander Soloviev (revolutionary) (1846–1879), Russian revolutionary
- Alexander Solovyov (politician) (1950–2023), Chairman of the State Council of the Udmurt Republic, Russia
- Aleksandr Solovyov (pole vaulter) (born 2002), Russian pole vaulter
