= Leonid Solovyov =

Leonid Solovyov or Soloviev may refer to the following Russian people:

- Leonid Solovyov (footballer) (1917–2004)
- Leonid Solovyov (writer) (1906–1962)
