= Lee Shearer =

English footballer

Personal information
- Date of birth: 23 October 1977 (age 49)
- Place of birth: Southend, England
- Position: Central defender

Youth career
- ????–1995: Leyton Orient

Senior career*
Years	Team	Apps	(Gls)
1995–1998	Leyton Orient	18	(1)
1997	Dover Athletic (loan)		
1997–1998	→ Dover Athletic (loan)		
1998–2002	→ Dover Athletic		
2002–2003	→ Margate	24	(1)
2003–2004	Gravesend & Northfleet	34	(1)
2004	Dover Athletic (loan)		
2004–2005	RKSV Leonidas		
2005–2006	Welling United		
2006	Folkestone Invicta		
2006–????	Maidstone United		
??????	Excelsior Rotterdam		
??????	FF Jaro		
????–2008	Maidstone United		
2008–20??	Faversham Town		
2011	Ashford United	4	(0)
- * Club domestic league appearances and goals as of 11:43, 13 May 2008 (UTC)

Lee Shearer (born 23 October 1977) is an English former professional footballer. His most notable former clubs include FF Jaro of the Veikkausliiga (Premier Finnish Division) and SBV Excelsior of the Dutch Eredivisie. He represented England at schoolboys level.

Shearer, former professional footballer, began his career as a trainee with Leyton Orient. He made his debut in October 1996, but was loaned to Dover Athletic in March 1997. He rejoined Dover on loan in November 1997, remaining with them until the end of the season. He was released by Orient and signed for Dover in July 1998. After four years as a regular in the Dover team, Shearer joined Margate in June 2002, having turned down a new contract with Dover. He played 24 times in the Conference before joining Gravesend & Northfleet in July 2003. He was loaned to Dover in October 2004 and released by Gravesend in December 2004. He was expected to join King's Lynn, but joined Dutch side RKSV Leonidas. In July 2005 joined Welling United, moving to Folkestone Invicta in February 2006. and then to Maidstone United in September 2006.

He later played for Dutch side Excelsior Rotterdam and Finnish side FF Jaro before rejoining Maidstone United, from where he joined Faversham Town in June 2008.

On 29 June 2011, Ashford United brought defender Lee Shearer on board ahead of a pre-season friendly against Gillingham and he subsequently played a handful of league matches for them.
