= Luis Daniel Cupla =

Uruguayan footballer (born 1977)

Personal information
- Date of birth: January 5, 1977 (age 48)
- Place of birth: Montevideo, Uruguay
- Height: 1.80 m (5 ft 11 in)
- Position: Midfielder

Senior career*
Years	Team	Apps	(Gls)
2000	Peñarol	20	(2)
2001–2002	Fénix		
2003	Rentistas		
2004	Progreso	9	(1)
2004	Club Sol de América	30	(2)
2005	Olimpia	2	(0)
2005	12 de Octubre	16	(1)
2006	The Strongest	5	(1)
2006	Sportivo Patria	12	(0)
2007–2008	Sol de América	60	(3)
2009	Kitchee SC		
2009	Sportivo Patria	8	(0)
2010	Rampla Juniors	4	(0)
2011	Independiente F.B.C.	25	(1)
- * Club domestic league appearances and goals

Luis Daniel Cupla (born January 5, 1977, in Montevideo, Uruguay) is a Uruguayan footballer currently playing for Independiente F.B.C. of the Primera División in Paraguay.

== Teams ==
- (Uruguay) Peñarol 2000
- (Uruguay) Fénix 2001-2002
- (Uruguay) Rentistas 2003
- (Uruguay) Progreso 2004
- (Paraguay) Sol de América 2004
- (Paraguay) Olimpia 2005
- (Paraguay) 12 de Octubre 2005
- (Bolivia) The Strongest 2006
- (Argentina) Sportivo Patria 2006
- (Paraguay) Sol de América 2007-2008
- (Hong Kong) Kitchee FC 2009
- (Argentina) Sportivo Patria 2009
- (Uruguay) Rampla Juniors 2010
- (Paraguay) Independiente F.B.C. 2011
