= Denis Soskov =

Russian footballer

Personal information
- Full name: Denis Nikolayevich Soskov
- Date of birth: 15 September 1977 (age 49)
- Height: 1.86 m (6 ft 1 in)
- Position: Midfielder

Youth career
- FC Chernomorets Novorossiysk

Senior career*
Years	Team	Apps	(Gls)
1995	FC Chernomorets Novorossiysk	0	(0)
1995–1996	FC Kolos Krasnodar	14	(1)
1995	→ FC Kolos-2 Krasnodar (loan)	12	(3)
1996–1999	FC Rostselmash Rostov-on-Don	5	(0)
1996–1999	→ FC Rostselmash-2 Rostov-on-Don (loans)	45	(3)
2000	FC Gazovik Orenburg	29	(4)
- * Club domestic league appearances and goals

Denis Nikolayevich Soskov (Russian: Денис Николаевич Сосков; born 15 September 1977) is a former Russian football player.
