= Andre Anis =

Estonian footballer

Personal information
- Full name: Andre Anis
- Date of birth: 25 May 1977 (age 49)
- Place of birth: Estonia
- Height: 1.76 m (5 ft 9 1/2 in)
- Position: Left back

International career
| Years | Team | Apps | (Gls) |
| 1995–2000 | Estonia | 3 | (0) |

Andre Anis (born 25 May 1977) is an Estonian retired association football defender and current football coach. He played for several clubs in his native country, including JK Viljandi Tulevik.

== International career ==
Anis earned his first official cap for the Estonia national football team on 19 May, 1995, when Estonia played Latvia at the 1995 Baltic Cup. He obtained a total number of three caps.
