= Rachid Berouas =

Moroccan footballer

Personal information
- Full name: Rachid Berouas
- Date of birth: April 28, 1977 (age 49)
- Place of birth: Kenitra, Morocco
- Height: 1.74 m (5 ft 8 1/2 in)
- Position: Midfielder

Team information
- Current team: KAC Kenitra

Youth career
- 1994–1996: KAC Kenitra

Senior career*
Years	Team	Apps	(Gls)
Since 1996	KAC Kenitra		
- * Club domestic league appearances and goals as of April 16, 2009 ‡ National team caps and goals as of October 17, 2008

Rachid Berouas is a Moroccan footballer who plays as midfielder for KAC Kenitra in the Moroccan Premier League.

Berouas was part of the KAC Kenitra side that gained promotion by winning the GNF-2 title during the 2001–02 season.
