= Terry Dyer =

Dominican footballer

Personal information
- Date of birth: 28 January 1977 (age 49)
- Position: Midfielder

International career
Years	Team	Apps	(Gls)
2004	Dominica	2	(0)

Terry Dyer (born 28 January 1977) is a Dominican former international footballer who played as a midfielder.

== Career ==
He made his international debut for Dominica in 2004, and appeared in FIFA World Cup qualifying matches.
