= Tymofii Soloviov =

Ukrainian businessman and singer (born 1999)

- Тимофій Соловйов
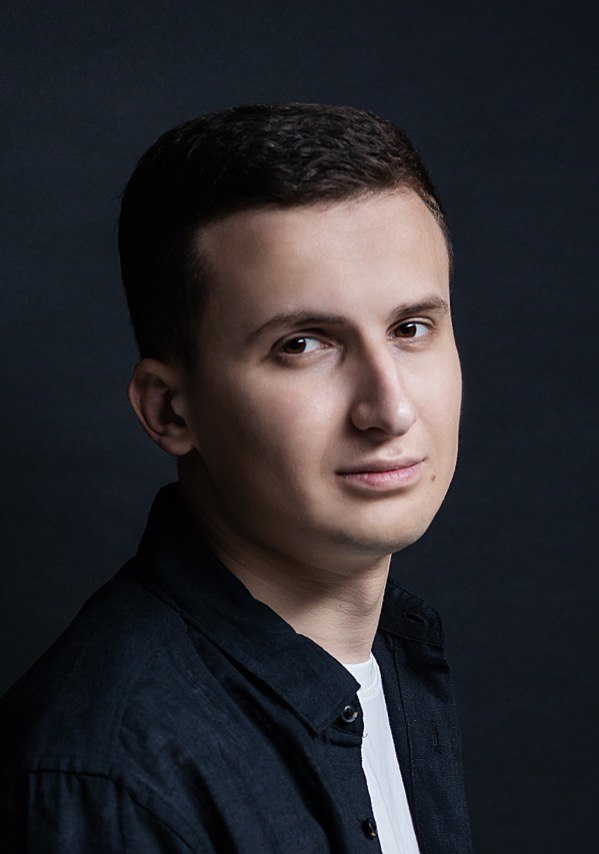
- Born: September 24, 1999 (age 26); Bobrynets, Kirovohrad Oblast
- Citizenship: Ukraine
- Occupations: singer, businessman
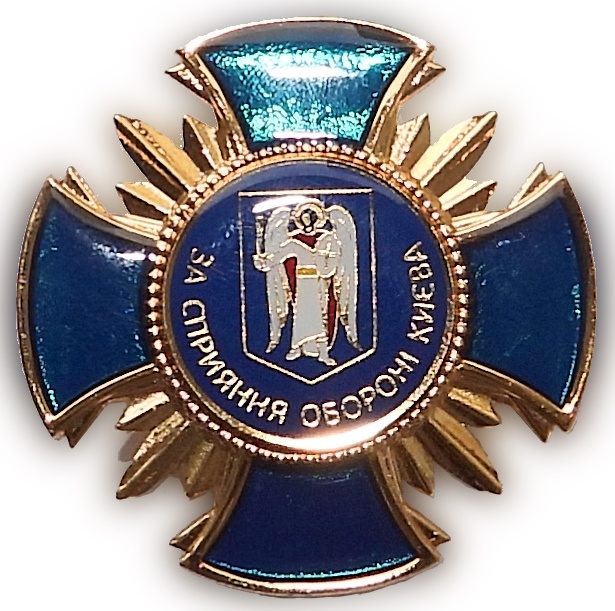
- Awards
- Website: http://s-timofei.com/

Tymofii Ihorovych Soloviov (Ukrainian: Тимофій Ігорович Соловйов; born 24 September 1999) is a Ukrainian entrepreneur and volunteer. He is also known as a singer under the name TIMA.

== Biography ==
Soloviov was born in Bobrynets, Kirovohrad Oblast. He began programming at the age of 14, and at 15, he became interested in model aircraft, which later grew into his own business.

=== Entrepreneur and volunteer ===
Since 2016 he has been working with volunteers and military personnel who participated in combat operations in the east of Ukraine in the Joint Forces Operation zone. Soloviov invested 1.5 million hryvnia in the production of FPV drones in Ukraine, in particular carbon frames and other components. In 2023, he registered RC Store, a company specializing in the import and sale of quadcopters and UAVs.

In 2017, Soloviov received the status of an official DJI drone dealer in Ukraine. He introduced AUTEL drones, but this venture did not bring the expected results. However, during the Russian full-scale invasion, they replaced drones that posed a threat to Ukrainian pilots due to the possibility of them being tracked by the enemy. During their active spread in America, Soloviov decided to implement them in Ukraine as well, signing contracts with the manufacturers, such as BETAFPV, GEPRC, and others. Their ready-made training kits made it easier for beginners to get started and created a lot of popularity and excitement through video reviews on YouTube.

Since the beginning of Russia's war against Ukraine, Soloviov, together with volunteers, has donated more than 500 quadcopters to the Armed Forces of Ukraine. Since early 2023, he has been working on training drones for the military, which have become an important tool for training FPV drone operators in military schools such as Boriviter, Victory Drones, and Global Drone.

In August 2025, Soloviov announced a new development of FPV drones capable of functioning effectively in conditions of active electronic warfare (EW). According to him, these drones "adapt to signal interference, which significantly reduces the impact of EW and increases the chance of successfully hitting targets." In 2025, RC Store, founded by Soloviov, was included in the "NEXT 250" Forbes Ukraine rating — a list of the most promising small and medium-sized companies in Ukraine, whose participants, according to the editorial board, have a good chance of breaking into the higher business league.

Major Ukrainian television channels, including ICTV, reported on the activities of Soloviov and his FPV-drones company RC Store. As of 2024, Soloviov is developing his own video transmitters, video receivers, and controllers, which are planned to be launched into serial production at a cost no higher than in China. Global leaders in FPV drone brands have recognized his company as their No. 1 customer for the purchase of FPV spectrum mechanisms in 2024 — Ukraine has overtaken the US in terms of purchases and has become the largest customer.

=== Musician ===
In June 2024, Soloviov began his musical career as a performer under the name TIMA. His debut track, "Krylo" (Wing), was written based on his personal story. The proceeds from the streams were donated to charity.

In four months of creativity, TIMA's songs, including "Хмари" (Clouds), "Падали" (Fallen) and "Накривай" (Cover Up), have garnered millions of plays on music platforms. In May 2025, TIMA presented the single "To the Stars" — a song about the path to dreams despite doubts and contempt from those around him. An official video for the single was released along with the track.

Discography

Singles

- "Krylo" (2024)
- "Khmary" (2024)
- "Padaly" (2024)
- "Nakryvay" (2024)
- "Poriad nema" (2024)
- "Nezminnyi" (2024)
- "Myt' Rizdva" (2024)
- "Marevi Nochi" (2025)
- "Tam til'ky ty" (2025)
- "Do zirok" (2025)
- "Sliozy diamantovi" (2025)

== Awards ==
- 2022, gratitude for contributing to the defense of the country during the Russian-Ukrainian war from the separate special forces regiment “AZOV” of the city of Kyiv.
- 2023, breastplate “For Assistance in the Defense of Kyiv” and “Cross of Support” for his contribution to supporting the Ukrainian military.
- 2023, honorary breastplate "For Assistance to the Army" from the Commander-in-Chief of the Armed Forces of Ukraine Valery Zaluzhny. (Note: Order of the Commander-in-Chief of the Armed Forces of Ukraine dated 08/28/2023 No. 1972.)
