= Irakli Gemazashvili =

Georgian footballer

Personal information
- Date of birth: 6 July 1977 (age 49)
- Place of birth: Soviet Union
- Height: 1.77 m (5 ft 9 1/2 in)
- Position: Midfielder

Team information
- Current team: Kickers 94 Markkleeberg

Senior career*
Years	Team	Apps	(Gls)
1993–1994	Rkoni Kaspi	8	(1)
1995–1996	Dinamo-2 Tbilisi	28	(0)
1996–1997	FC Dinamo Tbilisi	6	(0)
1997–1998	TSU Tbilisi	14	(0)
1998–1999	FC Arsenali Tbilisi	6	(0)
1999	FC Uralan Elista	0	(0)
2000–2003	VFC Plauen	79	(2)
2003–2004	FC Tbilisi	2	(0)
2004–2006	Hallescher FC	44	(7)
2006–2010	ZFC Meuselwitz	63	(1)
2010–	Kickers 94 Markkleeberg		

International career^{‡}
1998	Georgia	1	(0)
- * Club domestic league appearances and goals ‡ National team caps and goals as of 4 October 2008

Irakli Gemazashvili (born 6 July 1977) is a Georgia international footballer retired at Kickers 94 Markkleeberg and is now living in Georgia, Tbilisi.
