= Ramil Kharisov =

Russian footballer

Personal information
- Full name: Ramil Khavisovich Kharisov
- Date of birth: 18 May 1977 (age 49)
- Place of birth: Kazan, Russian SFSR
- Height: 1.78 m (5 ft 10 in)
- Position: Midfielder

Youth career
- SK im. Uritskogo Kazan

Senior career*
Years	Team	Apps	(Gls)
1995	FC KAMAZ-Chally Naberezhnye Chelny	0	(0)
1995	→ FC KAMAZ-d Naberezhnye Chelny	18	(1)
1996–1998	FC Rubin Kazan	28	(3)
1999	FC Avtomobilist Noginsk	24	(1)
2000	FC Alnas Almetyevsk (amateur)		
2001	FC Alnas Almetyevsk	8	(0)
2001	FC Chernomorets Novorossiysk	2	(0)
2002	FC Stroitel Ufa	27	(7)
2003	FC Sodovik Sterlitamak	31	(0)
2004	FC Gazovik Orenburg	13	(1)
2005	FC Iskra Kazan		
2005	FC Dynamo Kirov	18	(2)
- * Club domestic league appearances and goals

Ramil Khavisovich Kharisov (Tatar: Рамил Хәвис улы Харисов, romanized: Ramil Xäwis ulı Xarisof, Russian: Рамиль Хависович Харисов; born 18 May 1977) is a former Russian football player.

== Club career ==
He made his Russian Premier League debut for FC Chernomorets Novorossiysk on 11 July 2001 in a game against FC Spartak Moscow. That was his only season in the top tier.
