= Viktor Solovyov =

Viktor Solovyov (also Soloviev) may refer to the following Russian people:

- Viktor Solovyov (actor) (born 1950), actor in The Scythian
- Viktor Solovyov (sailor) (born 1957), Russian keelboat sailor
- Viktor Solovyov (swimmer) (born 1932), Russian backstroke swimmer
