= Niklas Storbacka =

Finnish footballer (born 1977)

Personal information
- Date of birth: 20 February 1977 (age 49)
- Place of birth: Finland
- Height: 1.75 m (5 ft 9 in)
- Positions: Defender; defensive midfielder

Team information
- Current team: FF Jaro
- Number: 2

Senior career*
Years	Team	Apps	(Gls)
1995–1998	FF Jaro	?	(?)
1999	Piteå IF	?	(?)
2000–	FF Jaro	?	(?)
- * Club domestic league appearances and goals

Niklas Storbacka (born 20 February 1977) is a Finnish footballer, who currently represents FF Jaro of Veikkausliiga, the Finnish premier division of football.

== See also ==
- Football in Finland
- List of football clubs in Finland
