= Anatoli Mironov =

Russian footballer and coach

Personal information
- Full name: Anatoli Viktorovich Mironov
- Date of birth: 26 July 1977 (age 49)
- Place of birth: Engels, Saratov Oblast, Russian SFSR
- Height: 1.75 m (5 ft 9 in)
- Position: Midfielder

Team information
- Current team: FC Sibir Novosibirsk (assistant coach)

Senior career*
Years	Team	Apps	(Gls)
1996–2002	FC Iskra Engels	172	(14)
2003–2004	FC Zvezda Irkutsk	49	(7)
2005	FC Avangard Kursk	26	(1)
2006	FC Sokol Saratov (D4)		
2007–2012	FC Sokol Saratov	142	(8)
2012–2013	FC Zenit Penza	18	(1)

Managerial career
- 2017: FC Sokol Saratov (administrator)
- 2017–2019: FC Sokol Saratov (assistant)
- 2019: FC Sokol Saratov (administrator)
- 2019–2024: FC Sokol Saratov (assistant)
- 2025–: FC Sibir Novosibirsk (assistant)
- * Club domestic league appearances and goals

Anatoli Viktorovich Mironov (Russian: Анатолий Викторович Миронов; born 26 July 1977) is a Russian professional football coach and former player. As of 2025, he works as an assistant coach of FC Sibir Novosibirsk.

== Club career ==
He played in the Russian Football National League for FC Avangard Kursk in 2005.
