= Vladimir Solovyov =

Vladimir Solovyov may refer to:

- Vladimir Solovyov (philosopher) (1853–1900), Russian philosopher
- Vladimir Solovyov (cosmonaut) (born 1946), Soviet-Russian cosmonaut
- Vladimir Solovyov (rower) (born 1946), Soviet-Russian Olympic rower
- Vladimir Solovyov (TV presenter) (born 1963), Russian television presenter, writer and propagandist
- Vladimir Solovyov, Soviet automotive designer, first Chief Designer at VAZ
- Vladimir Solovyov, a Fabergé workmaster
