= Raivo Nõmmik =

Estonian footballer

Personal information
- Full name: Raivo Nõmmik
- Date of birth: 11 February 1977 (age 49)
- Place of birth: Tallinn, then part of Estonian SSR, Soviet Union
- Height: 1.85 m (6 ft 1 in)
- Position: Defender

International career^{‡}
Years	Team	Apps	(Gls)
1995–2000	Estonia	17	(0)
- ‡ National team caps and goals as of 1 June 2009

Raivo Nõmmik (born 11 February 1977) is a retired football defender from Estonia. He played for several clubs in his native country, including JK Tallinna Kalev and JK Viljandi Tulevik. He has also played for Finnish club MyPa Anjalankoski.

== International career ==
Nõmmik earned his first official cap for the Estonia national football team on 20 May 1995, when Estonia played Lithuania at the Baltic Cup 1995. He obtained a total number of 17 caps for his native country.
