= Bogdan Stefanović =

Serbian-Slovak footballer

Personal information
- Date of birth: 9 July 1977 (age 49)
- Place of birth: Stara Pazova, SFR Yugoslavia
- Height: 1.84 m (6 ft 0 in)
- Position: Goalkeeper

Team information
- Current team: Michalovce (Goalkeeper coach)

Youth career
- Jedinstvo Stara Pazova

Senior career*
Years	Team	Apps	(Gls)
–1995	Jedinstvo Stara Pazova		
1995–1998	Sparta Prague	0	(0)
- Sparta Krč
1998–2001	Rimavská Sobota		
2000–2001	Chomutov	3	(0)
- SK Lázně Bohdaneč
2001–2002	Chomutov	5	(0)
2002–2007	Tatran Prešov		
2007–2008	Ekranas	41	(0)
2009	Humenné		
2009	Odeva Lipany		
2009	→ MFK Košice (loan)	8	(0)
2010–2012	Zemplín Michalovce		
2012–2015	ŠK Báhoň		
2015–2016	Slovan Kendice		

Managerial career
- 2011–2012: Michalovce (goalkeeper coach)
- 2019–: Podbrezová (goalkeeper coach)
- * Club domestic league appearances and goals

Bogdan Stefanović (born 9 July 1977 in Stara Pazova) is a Serbian-Slovak retired football goalkeeper.
