= Harry Libanotis =

Seychellois footballer

Harry Libanotis (born 29 September 1977) is a Seychellois football player. He was a defender on the Seychelles national football team.
