= Yuri Soloviev =

Yuri Soloviev (or Yury or Solovyov) may refer to the following Russian people:

- Yuri Soloviev (banker) (born 1970)
- Yuri Soloviev (dancer) (1940–1977), ballet dancer
- Yuri Soloviev (politician) (1925-2011), Soviet politician
- Yuri Khanon (born Yuri Soloviev-Savoyarov in 1965), composer
