= Nikolay Solovyov =

Nikolay Solovyov (also Nikolai or Nicolai or Soloviev) may refer to the following Russian people:

- Nikolay Solovyov (wrestler) (1931–2007)
- Nicolai Soloviev (1846–1916), music critic, composer, and teacher
