= Rustam Mustafin =

Russian footballer and coach

Personal information
- Full name: Rustam Mukhamedovich Mustafin
- Date of birth: 17 March 1977 (age 49)
- Height: 1.89 m (6 ft 2 in)
- Position: Defender

Youth career
- Torpedo Moscow

Senior career*
Years	Team	Apps	(Gls)
1994–1995	TRASKO Moscow	66	(2)
1996–1997	Torpedo-Luzhniki Moscow	5	(0)
1996–1997	→ Torpedo-Luzhniki-d Moscow	40	(5)
1998	Torpedo Vladimir	19	(0)
1999	Zhemchuzhina Sochi	16	(1)
2000–2001	Rubin Kazan	54	(0)
2002–2003	Baltika Kaliningrad	72	(3)
2004	Luch-Energiya Vladivostok	27	(0)
2005	Gomel	22	(0)
2006–2008	Lukhovitsy	57	(2)
2009–2010	Istra	51	(3)

Managerial career
- 2011–2012: Istra (assistant)
- * Club domestic league appearances and goals

Rustam Mukhamedovich Mustafin (Russian: Рустам Мухамедович Мустафин; born 17 March 1977) is a Russian professional football coach and a former player. He made his debut in the Russian Premier League in 1996 for FC Torpedo-Luzhniki Moscow.
