= Aleksei Dudin =

Russian footballer

Personal information
- Full name: Aleksei Vladimirovich Dudin
- Date of birth: 13 May 1977 (age 49)
- Height: 1.92 m (6 ft 3 1/2 in)
- Position: Defender

Youth career
- Tasma Kazan

Senior career*
Years	Team	Apps	(Gls)
1993–1997	FC KAMAZ Naberezhnye Chelny	4	(0)
1993–1997	→ FC KAMAZ-d Naberezhnye Chelny (loans)	107	(0)
1997	FC Neftekhimik Nizhnekamsk	0	(0)
1998	FC KAMAZ-Chally Naberezhnye Chelny	39	(0)
1999	FC Rubin Kazan	0	(0)
2001	FC Turbina Naberezhnye Chelny (amateur)		
2002	FC Spartak Yoshkar-Ola	28	(0)
2003	FC Saturn Naberezhnye Chelny (amateur)		
2004	FC Rodnik Alekseyevskaya		
2005	FC Spartak Yoshkar-Ola (amateur)		
- * Club domestic league appearances and goals

Aleksei Vladimirovich Dudin (Russian: Алексей Владимирович Дудин; born 13 May 1977) is a former Russian football player.

Dudin played in the Russian Premier League with FC KAMAZ Naberezhnye Chelny.
