= Aivar Priidel =

Estonian footballer

Personal information
- Full name: Aivar Priidel
- Date of birth: 12 May 1977 (age 49)
- Place of birth: Tallinn, then part of Estonian SSR, Soviet Union
- Height: 1.82 m (5 ft 11 1/2 in)
- Position: Midfielder

International career
Years	Team	Apps	(Gls)
1995	Estonia	2	(0)

Aivar Priidel (born 12 May 1977) is an Estonian football coach and retired midfielder. He played for several clubs in his native country, including FC Levadia Tallinn. He works as a coach for the same club.

== International career ==
Priidel earned his first official cap for the Estonia national football team on 19 May 1995, when Estonia played Latvia at the Baltic Cup 1995. He obtained a total number of two caps. He last played in 2019 for JK Retro football club.
