= Carsten Birk =

German footballer (born 1977)

Personal information
- Date of birth: 1 October 1977 (age 49)
- Place of birth: Völklingen, Germany
- Height: 1.87 m (6 ft 2 in)
- Position: Defender

Senior career*
Years	Team	Apps	(Gls)
1996–1997	SSV Eintracht Überherrn		
1998	1. FC Saarbrücken II		
1998–2000	1. FC Saarbrücken	4	(0)
2000–2002	Karlsruher SC	59	(4)
2002–2005	Greuther Fürth	43	(3)
2005–2010	SV Elversberg	76	(8)
- * Club domestic league appearances and goals

Carsten Birk (born 1 October 1977) is a German former professional footballer who played as a defender.
