= Milan Drageljević =

Serbian footballer

Personal information
- Date of birth: 28 February 1977 (age 49)
- Place of birth: Belgrade, Yugoslavia
- Height: 1.81 m (5 ft 11 1/2 in)
- Position: Defender

Youth career
- Zvezdara

Senior career*
Years	Team	Apps	(Gls)
1998–2002	OFK Beograd	74+	(1+)
2002–2006	Eintracht Trier	55	(1)
2006–2007	Victoria Rosport	9	(1)
Total		138	(3)
- * Club domestic league appearances and goals

Milan Drageljević (born 28 February 1977) is a Serbian former footballer who played as a defender. He played in the 2. Bundesliga with Eintracht Trier.
