= Aleksandr Grekhov =

Russian footballer

Personal information
- Full name: Aleksandr Aleksandrovich Grekhov
- Date of birth: 10 October 1977 (age 49)
- Height: 1.80 m (5 ft 11 in)
- Position: Midfielder

Youth career
- FC Torpedo Moscow

Senior career*
| Years | Team | Apps | (Gls) |
| 1995–1998 | FC Torpedo Moscow | 1 | (0) |
| 1995–1997 | → FC Torpedo-Luzhniki-d | 102 | (6) |
| 1998 | FC Tyumen | 6 | (0) |
| 1998 | Piteå IF | 7 | (1) |
| 1999–2000 | FC Spartak-Chukotka Moscow | 14 | (0) |
| 2001–2002 | FC Uralmash Yekaterinburg | 22 | (0) |
| 2002–2003 | FC Gazovik Orenburg | 35 | (4) |
| 2004 | FC Nosta Novotroitsk | 15 | (0) |
- * Club domestic league appearances and goals

Aleksandr Aleksandrovich Grekhov (Russian: Александр Александрович Грехов; born 10 October 1977) is a former Russian football player.
