= Toni Bernal =

Spanish footballer

Personal information
- Full name: Antonio José Bernal Iniesta
- Date of birth: 12 December 1977 (age 48)
- Place of birth: Sangonera, Spain
- Height: 1.83 m (6 ft 0 in)
- Position: Goalkeeper

Youth career
- Albacete

Senior career*
Years	Team	Apps	(Gls)
1999–2001	Sangonera		
2001–2003	Ciudad Murcia	1	(0)
2003–2005	Udinese	0	(0)
2003–2004	→ Ciudad Murcia (loan)	2	(0)
2004–2005	→ Lorca Deportiva (loan)	5	(0)
2005–2007	Motril	74	(0)
2007–2010	Roquetas	102	(0)
2010–2012	Yeclano		
2012–2013	Hellín		
- * Club domestic league appearances and goals

Antonio José 'Toni' Bernal Iniesta (born 12 December 1977 in Sangonera la Verde, Region of Murcia) is a Spanish retired footballer who played as a goalkeeper.
