= Márcio Hahn =

Brazilian footballer

Personal information
- Full name: Márcio Henrique Borges Hahn
- Date of birth: 3 July 1977 (age 49)
- Place of birth: Torres, Brazil
- Height: 1.80 m (5 ft 11 in)
- Position: Midfielder

Youth career
- 1996: Internacional

Senior career*
Years	Team	Apps	(Gls)
1994	Igrejinha		
1996	Cidreira	4	(0)
1997	Atlético Paranaense		
1998	Lajeadense		
1998–2001	Caxias		
2002	Internacional	22	(1)
2003–2004	Cruzeiro	3	(0)
2004	Mogi Mirim		
2005	Novo Hamburgo	0	(0)
2006	Juventude	2	(0)
2006	São Caetano	10	(1)
2007	15 de Novembro	15	(1)
2007	Atlético Paranaense		
2008	Novo Hamburgo	13	(4)
2008	ABC	33	(3)
2009	Grêmio Barueri	19	(0)
2010	Novo Hamburgo	16	(2)
2010	Brasil de Pelotas	7	(0)
2011	Novo Hamburgo	13	(1)
2011	Caxias	6	(1)
2012–2013	Novo Hamburgo	22	(0)
2013–2016	Brasil de Pelotas	66	(1)
2017	Esportivo	7	(0)

Managerial career
- 2017: Guarani (assistant)
- 2018: Criciúma (assistant)
- 2018–2019: Ceará (assistant)
- 2020–2021: América Mineiro (assistant)
- 2021: Vasco da Gama (assistant)
- 2022: Sport Recife (assistant)
- 2022: Santos (assistant)
- * Club domestic league appearances and goals

Márcio Henrique Borges Hahn (born 3 July 1977) is a Brazilian football coach and former player who played as a midfielder.

== Playing career ==
Known as Márcio during his playing days, he was born in Torres, Rio Grande do Sul, and played for local sides well into his 20s, notably winning the 2000 Campeonato Gaúcho with Caxias. He moved to Internacional for the 2002 season, featuring regularly before moving to Cruzeiro in 2003.

After featuring rarely for Cruzeiro, Márcio signed for Mogi Mirim. He later represented Novo Hamburgo (four stints), Juventude, São Caetano, 15 de Novembro, Atlético Paranaense, ABC, Grêmio Barueri and Brasil de Pelotas before returning to Caxias in May 2011.

Márcio returned to Novo Hamburgo for a fifth spell ahead of the 2012 season, and later rejoined Brasil de Pelotas in 2013. He left the latter on 3 May 2016, as his contract was not renewed, and signed for Esportivo on 23 January 2017. He retired shortly after, at the age of 39.

== Post-playing career ==
Shortly after retiring, Hahn was named Lisca's assistant at Guarani. He subsequently followed the manager to Criciúma, Ceará, América Mineiro, Vasco da Gama, Sport Recife and Santos.

== Honours ==
=== Player ===
Atlético Paranaense

- Campeonato Paranaense: 1997

Caxias

- Campeonato Gaúcho: 2000

Internacional

- Campeonato Gaúcho: 2002

Cruzeiro

- Campeonato Mineiro: 2003, 2004
- Copa do Brasil: 2003
- Campeonato Brasileiro Série A: 2003

Novo Hamburgo

- Copa FGF: 2005

ABC

- Campeonato Potiguar: 2008

Brasil de Pelotas

- Campeonato Gaúcho Série A2: 2013
