= John Boafo =

Ghanaian rower

Jon Boafo is a Ghanaian rower and the current national champion of the 2000 metre lightweight single sculler.

== Growing Up ==
Boafo grew up in France as his father worked as a diplomat. His stay in the country started his rowing interest. After migrating to the United States he attended the University of Georgia. He was a member of the United States university rowing system. This membership helped him to race in thirty States.

== Competitions ==
In 2013, during the Ghana Rowing and Canoeing Association's national championships, Mr. Boafo beat Umar Ahmed, Akanfela Musah and Yamin Asaase to become the national 2000 metre heavyweight single score championship. His win qualified him to participate in the Samsung World Rowing Cup in Sydney, Australia with the Ghanaian team. This was the first Ghanaian team to participate in an international rowing event.
