= Michał Świstak =

Polish footballer

Personal information
- Full name: Michał Świstak
- Date of birth: 1 June 1977 (age 49)
- Place of birth: Kraków, Poland
- Height: 1.86 m (6 ft 1 in)
- Position: Defender

Senior career*
Years	Team	Apps	(Gls)
1999	Garbarnia Kraków		
1999–2000	Proszowianka Proszowice		
2001–2002	Hutnik Kraków		
2002	Nida Pińczów		
2003	Górnik Wieliczka		
2003–2007	Cracovia	25	(2)
2008–2009	Górnik Wieliczka	37	(1)
2009–2011	Puszcza Niepołomice	43	(5)
- * Club domestic league appearances and goals

Michał Świstak (born 1 June 1977) is a Polish former professional footballer who played as a defender.

== Honours ==
Puszcza Niepołomice

- III liga Lesser Poland–Świętokrzyskie: 2009–10
