= Michael Preston (footballer) =

English footballer (born 1977)

Personal information
- Full name: Michael John Preston
- Date of birth: 22 November 1977 (age 48)
- Place of birth: Plymouth, England
- Positions: Winger; wing back

Youth career
- Torquay United

Senior career*
Years	Team	Apps	(Gls)
1995–1998	Torquay United	10	(0)
1998–1999	Weymouth		
1999–2000	Holsworthy		
2000–2003	Saltash United		
- * Club domestic league appearances and goals

Michael John Preston (born 22 November 1977) is an English former professional footballer who played in the Football League for Torquay United. He was born in Plymouth, Devon.

Preston was one of four trainees joining Torquay United in February 1994, after five existing trainees had been sacked by the club. His league debut came the following season: he made eight league appearances on the right wing as Torquay finished bottom of the Football League, only avoiding relegation to the Conference because Stevenage Borough's ground failed to meet the required standard. He turned professional in July 1996 and made two substitute appearances over the following Christmas period. However, he received knee cartilage and cruciate ligament damage in a reserve game at home to Plymouth Argyle on 28 January 1997 and was never to appear in the Gulls' first team again. He was eventually released at the end of the 1997–98 season and joined Weymouth that summer.

In 1999–2000, Preston was playing for South Western League club Holsworthy, and before the 2000–01 season, he joined fellow South Western League side Saltash United but made limited appearances due to persistent knee problems. Preston eventually retired from playing competitively at the end of the 2002–2003 season and now works as an electrician.
