= Feras Taleb =

Jordanian footballer

Personal information
- Full name: Feras Taleb Abu Obeid
- Date of birth: 10 May 1977 (age 49)
- Place of birth: Jordan
- Position: Goalkeeper

Senior career*
Years	Team	Apps	(Gls)
1998–2008	Al Buqa		

International career
2003–2005	Jordan	12	(0)
- * Club domestic league appearances and goals

Feras Taleb Abu Obeid (born 10 May 1977) is a Jordanian football goalkeeper who played for Jordan in the 2004 Asian Cup. He also played for Al Buqa.

== See also ==
- Football in Jordan
