= Edgar Streltsov =

Russian footballer

Personal information
- Date of birth: 14 September 1977 (age 49)
- Height: 1.76 m (5 ft 9 1/2 in)
- Position: Forward

Senior career*
| Years | Team | Apps | (Gls) |
| 1994 | FC Metallurg Lipetsk | 14 | (1) |
| 1995 | FC Kolos Krasnodar | 0 | (0) |
| 1995 | → FC Kolos-2 Krasnodar (loan) | 4 | (0) |
| 1995–1996 | FC Rostselmash Rostov-on-Don | 3 | (0) |
| 1996 | → FC Rostselmash-2 Rostov-on-Don (loan) | 14 | (3) |
| 1996–1997 | FC Lausanne-Sport | 1 | |
| 1996–1997 | → FC Lausanne-Sport U21 | | |
| 1997–1998 | FC Stade Nyonnais | | |
| 1998–1999 | Vevey-Sports | | |

International career
| 1995–1996 | Russia U18 | | |
| 1997–1998 | Russia U21 | | |
- * Club domestic league appearances and goals

Edgar Streltsov (Russian: Эдгар Стрельцов; born 14 September 1977) is a former Russian football player.

He currently lives in Switzerland and works for FIFA.
