= Sébastien Pauvert =

French footballer (born 1977)

Personal information
- Date of birth: September 27, 1977 (age 49)
- Place of birth: Beaupréau, France
- Height: 1.88 m (6 ft 2 in)
- Position: Goalkeeper

Team information
- Current team: Fontenay

Senior career*
Years	Team	Apps	(Gls)
1998–2003	Nantes (B team)		
2000–2001	→ Cholet (loan)		
2002–2003	→ Istres (loan)	8	(0)
2003–2004	Istres	1	(0)
2004–2005	US Quevilly		
2005–	Fontenay		
- * Club domestic league appearances and goals as of 20:17, 25 November 2009 (UTC)

Sébastien Pauvert (born September 27, 1977) is a French professional football player. Currently, he plays in the Championnat de France amateur for Vendée Fontenay Foot.

He played on the professional level in Ligue 2 for FC Istres.
