= Kwabena Boafo =

Ghanaian football player

Personal information
- Full name: Kwabena Boafo
- Date of birth: September 1, 1977 (age 49)
- Place of birth: Ghana
- Position: Defender

Senior career*
Years	Team	Apps	(Gls)
1997–2001	Sekondi Hasaacas	59	(7)
2001–2010	Hearts of Oak	95	(8)

International career
2004	Ghana	1	(0)
- * Club domestic league appearances and goals

Kwabena Boafo (born September 1, 1977) is a Ghanaian football player who played for Hearts of Oak.

== Career ==
Boafo began his career at Sekondi Hasaacas in 1997. He joined Hearts of Oak in 2001, where he later became the team captain.

== International ==
Boafo played his only game for the Ghana national football team in 2005.
