= Denis Solovyov =

Russian footballer and coach

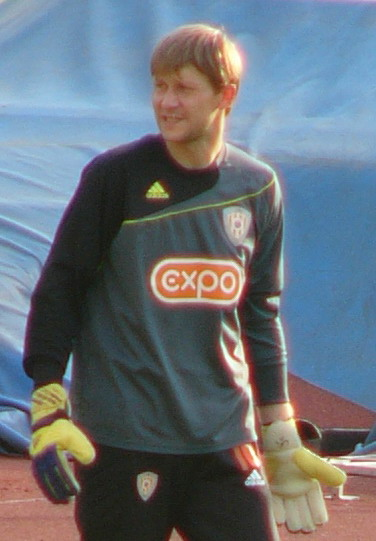

Personal information
- Full name: Denis Vladimirovich Solovyov
- Date of birth: 18 August 1977 (age 49)
- Height: 1.92 m (6 ft 4 in)
- Position: Goalkeeper

Team information
- Current team: FC Dynamo Vladivostok (GK coach)

Senior career*
Years	Team	Apps	(Gls)
1995	FC Dynamo Mikhaylovka	18	(0)
1997	FC Energetik Uren	23	(0)
1998–2002	FC Lada Togliatti	74	(0)
2003	FC Volgar-Gazprom Astrakhan	33	(0)
2004	FC Lisma-Mordoviya Saransk	34	(0)
2005	FC Nosta Novotroitsk	16	(0)
2006	FK Rīga	22	(0)
2007	FC Kairat	9	(0)
2007–2008	FC Petrolul Ploieşti	20	(0)
2008	FC Lada Togliatti	13	(0)
2009	FC Zhemchuzhina-Sochi	5	(0)

Managerial career
- 2019–2020: FC Akron Tolyatti (administrator)
- 2020–2021: FC Akron Tolyatti (GK coach)
- 2022–2024: FC Irtysh Omsk (GK coach)
- 2025–: FC Dynamo Vladivostok (GK coach)
- * Club domestic league appearances and goals

Denis Vladimirovich Solovyov (Russian: Денис Владимирович Соловьёв; born 18 August 1977) is a Russian professional football coach and a former player. He is the goalkeepers' coach with FC Dynamo Vladivostok.

== Club career ==
He played 6 seasons in the Russian Football National League for FC Lada Togliatti, FC Volgar-Gazprom Astrakhan and FC Lisma-Mordoviya Saransk.
