= Aleksei Solovyov (footballer) =

Russian footballer

Personal information
- Full name: Aleksei Aleksandrovich Solovyov
- Date of birth: 15 March 1996 (age 30)
- Place of birth: Moscow, Russia
- Height: 1.83 m (6 ft 0 in)
- Positions: Defender; midfielder

Senior career*
Years	Team	Apps	(Gls)
2014–2015	FC Lokomotiv Moscow	0	(0)
2016	FC Zenit Penza	22	(1)
2017–2019	FC Armavir	64	(2)
2019–2020	FC Fakel Voronezh	16	(1)
2021	FC Kuban Krasnodar	14	(0)
2021–2022	FC SKA Rostov-on-Don	29	(0)
2022–2023	FC Metallurg Lipetsk	20	(0)
2023	FC Spartak Kostroma	14	(1)
2024	FC Leon Saturn Ramenskoye	28	(5)
- * Club domestic league appearances and goals as of 3 November 2024

Aleksei Aleksandrovich Solovyov (Russian: Алексей Александрович Соловьёв; born 15 March 1996) is a Russian football player.

== Club career ==
He made his debut in the Russian Professional Football League for FC Zenit Penza on 10 April 2016 in a game against FC Chertanovo Moscow.

He made his Russian Football National League debut for FC Armavir on 17 July 2018 in a game against FC SKA-Khabarovsk.
