= Godfrey Ssali =

Ugandan footballer (born 1977)

Personal information
- Date of birth: February 6, 1977 (age 49)
- Place of birth: Uganda
- Height: 1.80 m (5 ft 11 in)
- Position: Midfielder

Team information
- Current team: Express FC
- Number: 8

Youth career
- –2000: Police Jinja

Senior career*
Years	Team	Apps	(Gls)
2001–2004	Police Jinja		
2004–present	Express FC		

International career
2003–2004	Uganda	8	(0)
- * Club domestic league appearances and goals as of August 31, 2007

Godfrey Ssali (born February 6, 1977) is a Ugandan football midfielder for Ugandan Premier League club Express FC.

== Career ==
He began his career by Police Jinja in the Ugandan Premier League, before 2004 moving to Express FC.

== International career ==
He played from 2003 between 2004 for the Uganda national football team.
