= Nihat Emre Numanbayraktaroğlu =

Turkish footballer

Personal information
- Date of birth: 9 January 1977 (age 49)
- Place of birth: İzmit, Turkey
- Height: 1.80 m (5 ft 11 in)
- Position: Midfielder

Youth career
- Kocaelispor

Senior career*
Years	Team	Apps	(Gls)
- Kocaelispor
- * Club domestic league appearances and goals

Nihat Emre Numanbayraktaroğlu (born 9 January 1977), is a Turkish football coach and former player who is assistant coach for Giresunspor.

== Professional career ==
- 1997–1999 Kocaelispor
- 1999–2000 Yozgat Yimpaş Spor
- 2000–2001 Kocaelispor
- 2001–2002 Marmaris Bld. Gençlikspor
- 2002–2004 Darıca Gençlerbirliği
- 2004–2006 Gölcükspor

== Coaching career ==
- 2008–2009 Kocaelispor S.Gençler League Trainer
- 2009–2012 Kocaelispor U18 Coach
- 2012–2013 Kocaelispor U14 Coach
- 2013–2014 Kocaelispor Professional Team Coach
- 2014–2014 Umm-Salal SC (assistant coach)
- 2015–2016 Giresunspor (assistant coach)
