= Aleksei Gridnev =

Russian footballer

Personal information
- Full name: Aleksei Aleksandrovich Gridnev
- Date of birth: 28 April 1977 (age 49)
- Height: 1.74 m (5 ft 8 1/2 in)
- Position: Midfielder

Youth career
- RO UOR Rostov-on-Don

Senior career*
Years	Team	Apps	(Gls)
1995–1996	FC Istochnik Rostov-on-Don	32	(2)
1996	FC Inter Rostov-on-Don		
1997–1998	FC Rostselmash Rostov-on-Don	1	(0)
1997–1998	→ FC Rostselmash-2 Rostov-on-Don (loans)	56	(10)
2000	FC Urozhay Chertkovo		
2001–2002	Happy End Camenca	14	(1)
2004–2006	FC Spartak Yoshkar-Ola (amateur)		
2007	FC Taganrog	12	(0)
2008	FSC Rybinsk (amateur)		
- * Club domestic league appearances and goals

Aleksei Aleksandrovich Gridnev (Russian: Алексей Александрович Гриднев; born 28 April 1977) is a former Russian football player.
