= Autel Robotics =

Chinese consumer and commercial aerial drone manufacturer

Autel Robotics Co., Ltd.
- Type: Private
- Industry: Consumer and commercial aerial drone manufacturing
- Founded: 2014; 12 years ago
- Headquarters: Shenzhen, China
- Area served: Worldwide
- Key people: Maxwell Lee; Li Hongjing
- Owner: Formerly Autel Intelligent Technology
- Website: www.autelrobotics.com

Autel Robotics is a Chinese consumer and commercial aerial drone manufacturer. Founded in 2014, the company is headquartered in Shenzhen, China. It was formerly a subsidiary of Autel Intelligent Technology (AIT), until it was spun off when AIT went public in 2020.

== History ==
Autel Robotics Co., Ltd. was founded in 2014 in Shenzhen by Maxwell Lee and Li Hongjing. Maxwell Lee is a Chinese American entrepreneur.

Autel Robotics has received government funding and support from the Chinese government. The company released its first drone called X-Star in 2015 in global markets and has other notable product lines, including the Evo and Dragon Fish series.

In 2021 Autel Robotics had a 7% share of the UAV market in the United States. The company's market share increased after leading rival drone manufacturer DJI (also based in China) was restricted by the US government.

Along with DJI, Autel's drones have been widely acquired by US law enforcement and government agencies. Concerns have frequently been raised about potential risks associated with this type of use, but significant evidence of risk has not been presented, and there has been criticism of the concerns.

In 2023 at the Consumer Electronics Show in Las Vegas Autel Robotics made its intention to surpass DJI in both technology and market share known. In 2023, Autel Robotics threatened to sue a researcher at the American Enterprise Institute for defamation over an op-ed piece in Defense News that labeled their products a national security risk.

In 2025, an investigation conducted by Yuval Abraham of +972 Magazine revealed that throughout the Gaza War, EVO series drones made by Autel are used by the Israeli army to attack unarmed civilians, including elderly and children using a grenade-dropping attachment (Known internally as 'Iron Ball'). Many of the drones used were purchased independently by soldiers using crowdfunding or donated by the US army. In response Autel stated that the attacks were carried "without our knowledge, authorization, or consent."

== Organization ==
Autel Robotics Co., Ltd. used to be a subsidiary of Autel Intelligent Technology but was spun-off prior to the latter's 2020 IPO.

In 2023, Autel Robotics had offices in China (the location of the company's headquarters), Italy, the United States (Seattle), Germany, and Singapore.

== Products ==
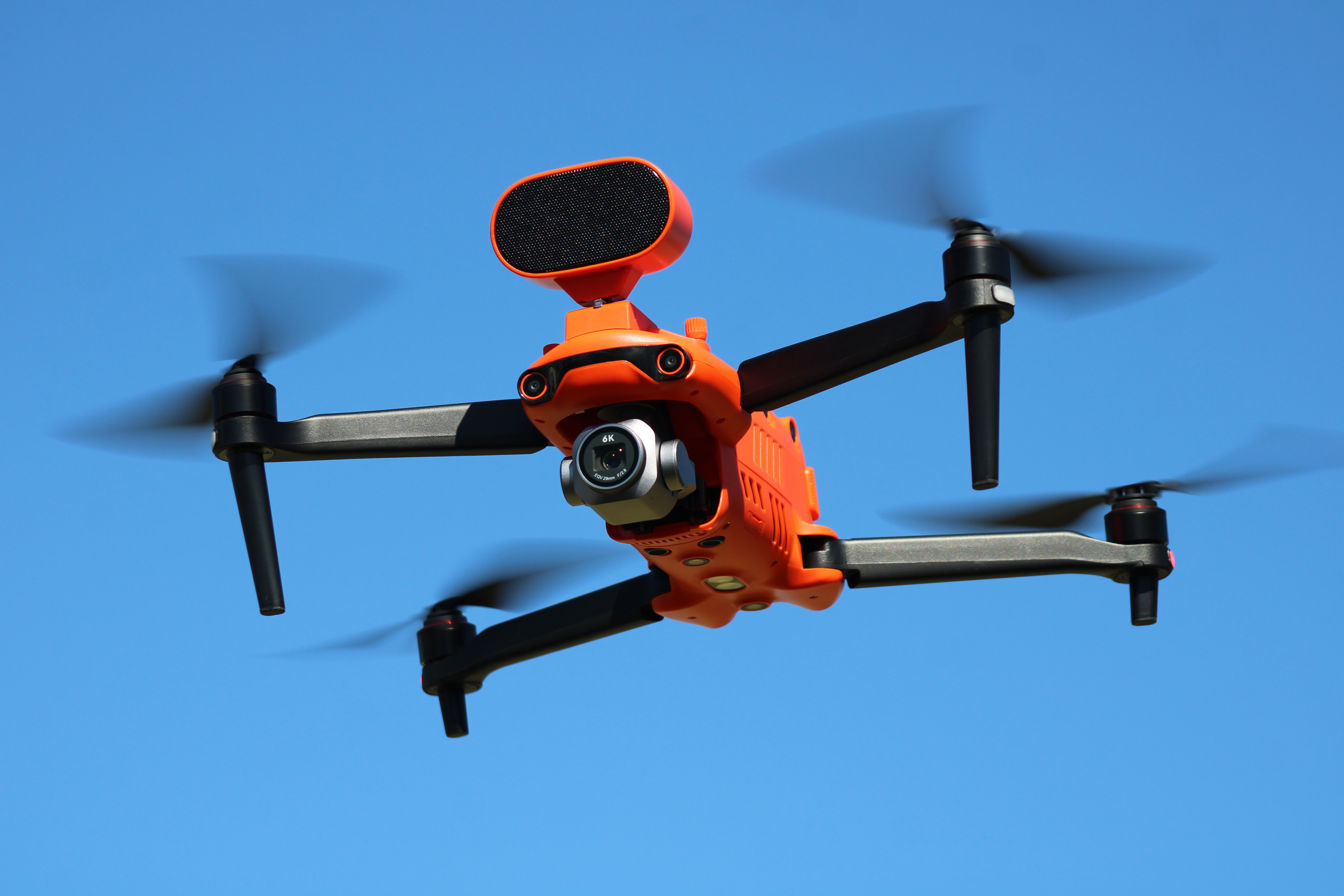
Autel EVO II Pro Enterprise V3 with loudspeaker attachment

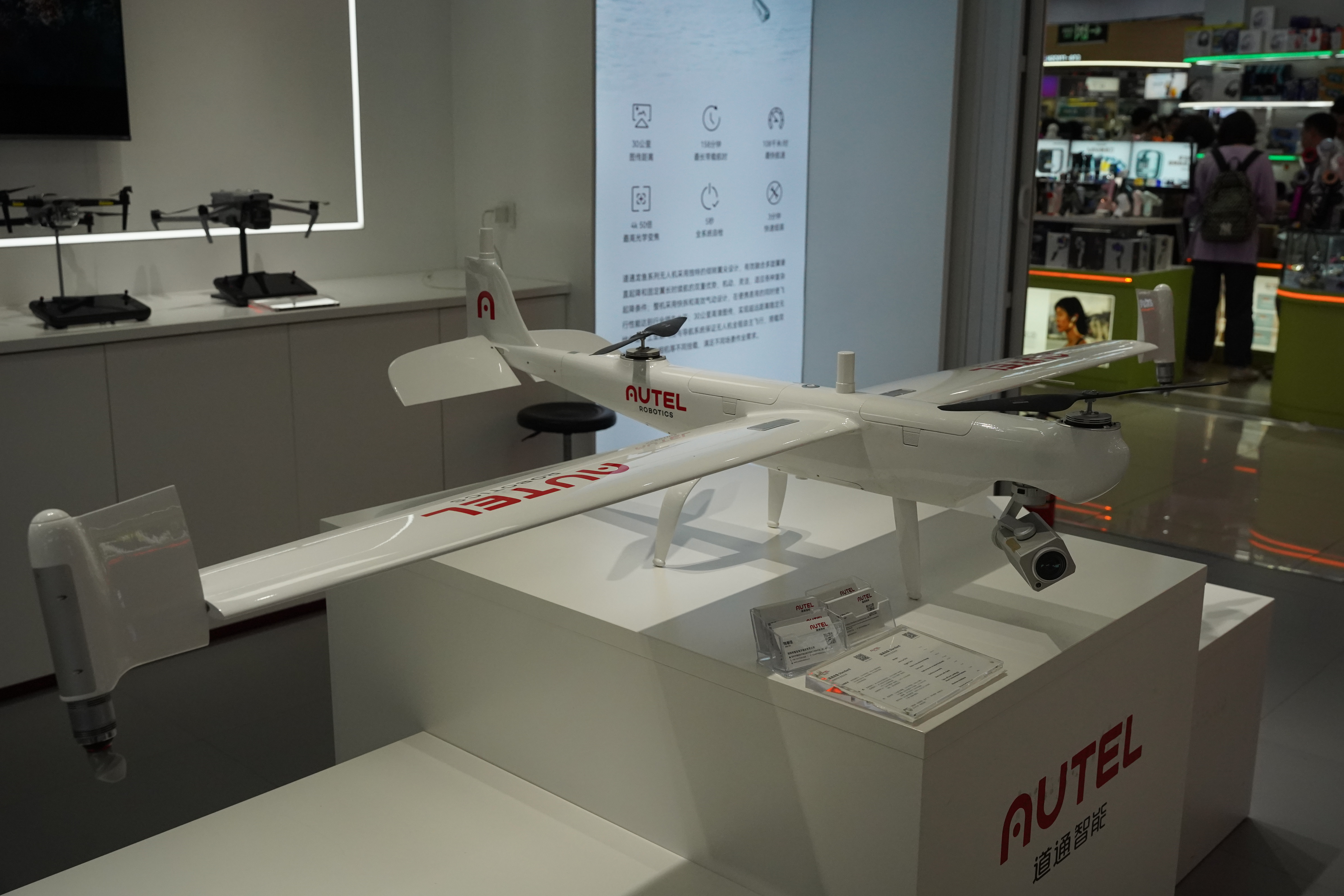
Autel Dragonfish eVTOL tiltrotor UAV

- EVO Nano+, ultra-light drone
- EVO Lite, light drone with a 4K camera. Small enough that a Remote ID is not required
- EVO Lite +, light drone with a 5k camera
- Autel EVO II V3, most popular model in 2023
- Autel EVO Max, intended for the emergency response market
- EVO Max T4, intended to be a serious competitor to DJI's offering. It has increased autonomy, AI features, and an open architecture. Features a thermal camera as standard.
- Dragonfish, fixed wing drone with VTOL capabilities
- Dragonfish Lite, smaller version of the Dragonfish
- Dragonfish Pro, a long range variant of the Dragonfish

== Users ==
- U.S. Capitol Police, briefly operated Autel Robotics drones before being retired due to security concerns. The adoption of the drones was criticized by Senator Ted Cruz.
