= Puchezh =

Town in Ivanovo Oblast, Russia

Puchezh Пучеж
- Town
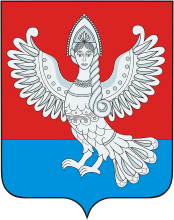
- Coat of arms
- Interactive map of Puchezh
- Location of Puchezh Puchezh (Ivanovo Oblast)
- Coordinates: 56°59′N 43°10′E
- Country: Russia
- Federal subject: Ivanovo Oblast
- Administrative district: Puchezhsky District
- First mentioned: 1594
- Elevation: 100 m (330 ft)

Population (2010 Census)
  - Total: 8,588
  - Estimate (2021): 6,879 (−19.9%)

Administrative status
  - Capital of: Puchezhsky District

Municipal status
  - Municipal district: Puchezhsky Municipal District
  - Urban settlement: Puchezhskoye Urban Settlement
  - Capital of: Puchezhsky Municipal District, Puchezhskoye Urban Settlement
- Time zone: UTC+3 (MSK)
- Postal codes: 155360, 155362, 155389
- OKTMO ID: 24621101001

Puchezh (Russian: Пу́чеж) is a port town and the administrative center of Puchezhsky District in Ivanovo Oblast, Russia, located on the west side of the Volga River, 175 kilometers (109 mi) east of Ivanovo, the administrative center of the oblast. Population: 8,620 (2026 estimate), 6,879 (2021 census); 8,588 (2010 census); 10,345 (2002 census); 12,712 (1989 Soviet census).

== History ==
It was first mentioned as Puchishche sloboda in 1594. In the 19th century, it became a center for the grain industry and the flax trade. In 1862, a major thread-producing plant was founded. Nearby Ivanovo's weaving industry was fed off of Puchezh's flax trade and a large number of female workers would move there seeking employment.

In 1952, Gorky Reservoir flooded, putting the town in danger. For the next three years, the town slowly uprooted itself, was carried to a higher location, and was rebuilt.

== Administrative and municipal status ==
Within the framework of administrative divisions, Puchezh serves as the administrative center of Puchezhsky District, to which it is directly subordinated. Prior to the adoption of the Law #145-OZ On the Administrative-Territorial Division of Ivanovo Oblast in December 2010, it used to be incorporated separately as an administrative unit with the status equal to that of the districts.

As a municipal division, the town of Puchezh is incorporated within Puchezhsky Municipal District as Puchezhskoye Urban Settlement.

== Economy ==
Today, Puchezh still maintains a flax enterprise and a sewing factory. The town's industries now include a plant producing reinforced concrete works, a woodworking industry, and their cultural pride, the Istoki factory. Istoki is an artistic trade that involves making works of traditional embroidery, both by hand and by machine, to make patterns influenced by the ancient art from the Volga region.
