= Puchezhsky District =

District in Ivanovo Oblast, Russia

Puchezhsky District Пучежский район (Russian)
- District
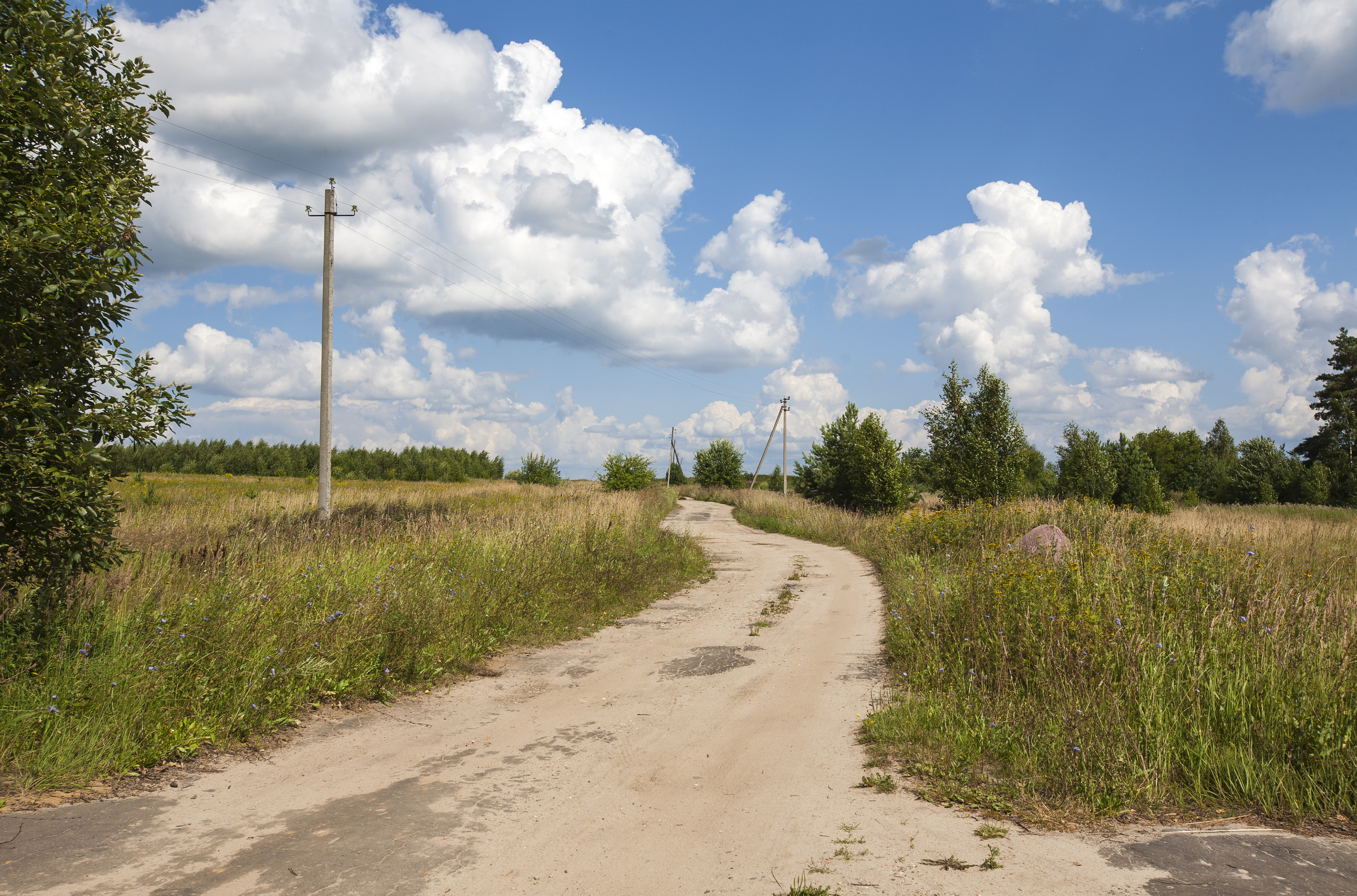
- Village (selo) Umekovo, Puchezhsky District

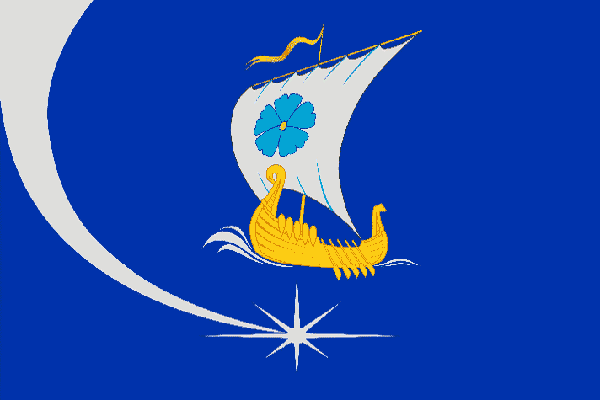
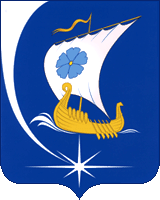
- Flag Coat of arms
- Location of Puchezhsky District in Ivanovo Oblast
- Coordinates: 59°59′N 43°10′E
- Country: Russia
- Federal subject: Ivanovo Oblast
- Administrative center: Puchezh

Area
  - Total: 785 km^{2} (303 sq mi)

Population (2010 Census)
  - Total: 13,863
  - Density: 17.7/km^{2} (45.7/sq mi)
  - Urban: 61.9%
  - Rural: 38.1%

Administrative structure
  - Inhabited localities: 1 cities/towns, 234 rural localities

Municipal structure
  - Municipally incorporated as: Puchezhsky Municipal District
  - Municipal divisions: 1 urban settlements, 4 rural settlements
- Time zone: UTC+3 (MSK)
- OKTMO ID: 24621000
- Website: http://xn----8sbnekgcd6ajcsiz4d.xn--p1ai/

Puchezhsky District (Russian: Пу́чежский райо́н) is an administrative and municipal district (raion), one of the twenty-one in Ivanovo Oblast, Russia. It is located in the east of the oblast. The area of the district is 785 square kilometers (303 sq mi). Its administrative center is the town of Puchezh. Population: 11,066 (2021 census); 13,863 (2010 census); 17,490 (2002 Census); 22,060 (1989 Soviet census). The population of Puchezh accounts for 62.2% of the district's total population.

== Administrative and municipal status ==
The town of Puchezh serves as the administrative center of the district. Prior to the adoption of the Law #145-OZ On the Administrative-Territorial Division of Ivanovo Oblast in December 2010, it was administratively incorporated separately from the district. Municipally, Puchezh is incorporated within Puchezhsky Municipal District as Puchezhskoye Urban Settlement.
