= Aleksi =

- Gender: Male

Other names
- Alternative spelling: Aleksy
- Related names: Alexey

Aleksi is a masculine Finnish given name. Notable people with the name include:

- Aleksi Bardy, Finnish screenwriter and film producer
- Aleksi Benashvili, Georgian footballer
- Aleksi Eeben, Finnish composer, sound designer, musician and programmer
- Aleksi Elorinne, Finnish ice hockey player
- Aleksi Heimosalmi, Finnish ice hockey player
- Aleksi Hihnavaara, Finnish frontiersman
- Aleksi Holmberg, Finnish ice hockey player
- Aleksi Honka-Hallila, Finnish footballer
- Aleksi Laakso, Finnish ice hockey player
- Alexi Laiho, Finnish musician
- Aleksi Lehtonen, Finnish bishop
- Aleksi Mäkelä (disambiguation), several people
- Aleksi Mustonen, Finnish ice hockey player
- Aleksi Orenius, Finnish ice hockey player
- Aleksi Paananen, Finnish footballer
- Aleksi Perälä, Finnish music composer and producer
- Aleksi Randell, Finnish politician
- Aleksi Ristola, Finnish footballer
- Aleksi Rutanen, Finnish ice hockey player
- Aleksi Saarela, Finnish ice hockey player
- Aleksi Sariola, Finnish actor, singer and TV presenter
- Aleksi Sihvonen, Finnish musician
- Aleksi Tarvonen, Finnish footballer

== See also ==
- Aleksy
- Alexy
- Alexey
- Alexie
