= Deuterosminthurus bisetosus =

Scientific classification
- Domain: Eukaryota
- Kingdom: Animalia
- Phylum: Arthropoda
- Class: Collembola
- Order: Symphypleona
- Family: Bourletiellidae
- Genus: Deuterosminthurus
- Species: D. bisetosus

Binomial name
- Deuterosminthurus bisetosus Baquero, Moraza & Jordana, 2003

Species of springtail

Deuterosminthurus bisetosus is a species of springtail discovered living on the broom Genista hispanica in the autonomous community of Navarre in Spain.

This small globular springtail (up to 1.4 mm in length) is yellow, usually, though not always, with variable reddish-brown markings on its back. Around 10% of the examples observed have been found to be host to a new species of red mite which has been named Polydiscia deuterosminthurus. These mites, which ride on the back of their hosts attached just behind the head, are clearly a major burden as they average a third of the length of D. bisetosus.

This springtail has been observed on its host plant in May and June but leaves it as the air temperature rises (springtails of this type are especially susceptible to desiccation). Where these creatures (and their parasites) spend the rest of the year has yet to be discovered.
