= Rutanen =

Surname list

Rutanen is a Finnish surname. Notable people with the surname include:

- Aleksi Rutanen (born 1994), Finnish ice hockey player
- Pasi Rutanen (born 1936), Finnish journalist and diplomat

== See also ==
- Rautanen
