= Aleksy =

Aleksy – Polish name, male first name deriving from the Greek Aléxios (Αλέξιος), meaning "Defender", and thus of the same origin as the Latin Alexius.

The feminine forms of the name are Aleksja and Aleksa.

== People known by first name Aleksy ==
- Aleksy Antkiewicz (1923–2005), Polish boxer
- Aleksy Ćwiakowski (1895–1953), Polish political activist
- Aleksy Husarzewski (1714-1782) – Polish diplomat, royal commissioner
- Aleksy Janiec (born 21 February 2003) – Polish basketball player
- Aleksy Komorowski (born 1987) – Polish television and film actor
- Aleksy Konieczny (born 9 May 1977), Polish bobsledder
- Aleksy Kowalik (1915-2011) – soldier of the Polish Army of WWII, defender of Westerplatte
- Aleksy Kuziemski (born 1977), Polish boxer
- Aleksy Nehring (1891-1916) – second lieutenant of the Polish Legions
- Aleksy Parol (1927-1994) – Polish military officer, rear admiral
- Aleksy Piątkiewicz (1911-1994) – Polish specialist in the field of machine construction and construction
- Aleksy Rżewski (1885-1939) – mayor of Łódź in the Second Polish Republic
- Aleksy Sobaszek (1895–1942), Polish Roman Catholic priest
- Aleksy Sylvius (1159-1656) – Polish astronomer, Catholic priest
- Aleksy Tralle (born 1958) – Polish mathematician
- Aleksy Uchański (born 16 September 1974) – Polish journalist, specialist in the field of electronic media and computer games
- Aleksy Wdziękoński (1892-1946) – Polish diplomat
- Aleksy Zin (1917-1991) – Polish wood technologist, wood industry manager
- Maciej Aleksy Dawidowski (1920–1943), Polish Scoutmaster, codename "Alek"

== See also ==
- Aleksi (disambiguation)
- Aleksis (disambiguation)
- Alexey (disambiguation)
- Alexis (disambiguation)
- Alexy (disambiguation)
- Alexie (disambiguation)
