= Bourletiella viridescens =

Scientific classification
- Kingdom: Animalia
- Phylum: Arthropoda
- Class: Collembola
- Order: Symphypleona
- Family: Bourletiellidae
- Genus: Bourletiella
- Species: B. viridescens

Binomial name
- Bourletiella viridescens Stach, 1920

Species of springtail

Bourletiella viridescens is a species of springtail. Its common name is garden springtail.
