= Polydiscia deuterosminthurus =

Scientific classification
- Domain: Eukaryota
- Kingdom: Animalia
- Phylum: Arthropoda
- Subphylum: Chelicerata
- Class: Arachnida
- Order: Trombidiformes
- Family: Tanaupodidae
- Genus: Polydiscia
- Species: P. deuterosminthurus

Binomial name
- Polydiscia deuterosminthurus Baquero, Moraza & Jordana, 2003

Species of mite

Polydiscia deuterosminthurus is a species of mite recently discovered in the autonomous community of Navarre in Spain.

Only the six-legged larval stage is so far known. This lives as a parasite on the springtail Deuterosminthurus bisetosus, which was discovered at the same time as the parasite. The association between the two species only seems to last for a few weeks in May and June. Both creatures appear to be entirely restricted to a single host plant at this stage of their life cycle: the broom Genista hispanica.

These red mites are tiny, less than 0.3 mm in length but are huge in comparison to their hosts, averaging a third of the length of Deuterosminthurus bisetosus, to which they attach piggyback-fashion, the jaws embedded in the joint between head and prothorax. The remainder of the life cycle of this mite remains a total mystery.
