= Bourletiella rustica =

Scientific classification
- Domain: Eukaryota
- Kingdom: Animalia
- Phylum: Arthropoda
- Class: Collembola
- Order: Symphypleona
- Family: Bourletiellidae
- Genus: Bourletiella
- Species: B. rustica

Binomial name
- Bourletiella rustica Maynard, 1951

Species of springtail

Bourletiella rustica is a species of globular springtails in the family Bourletiellidae.
