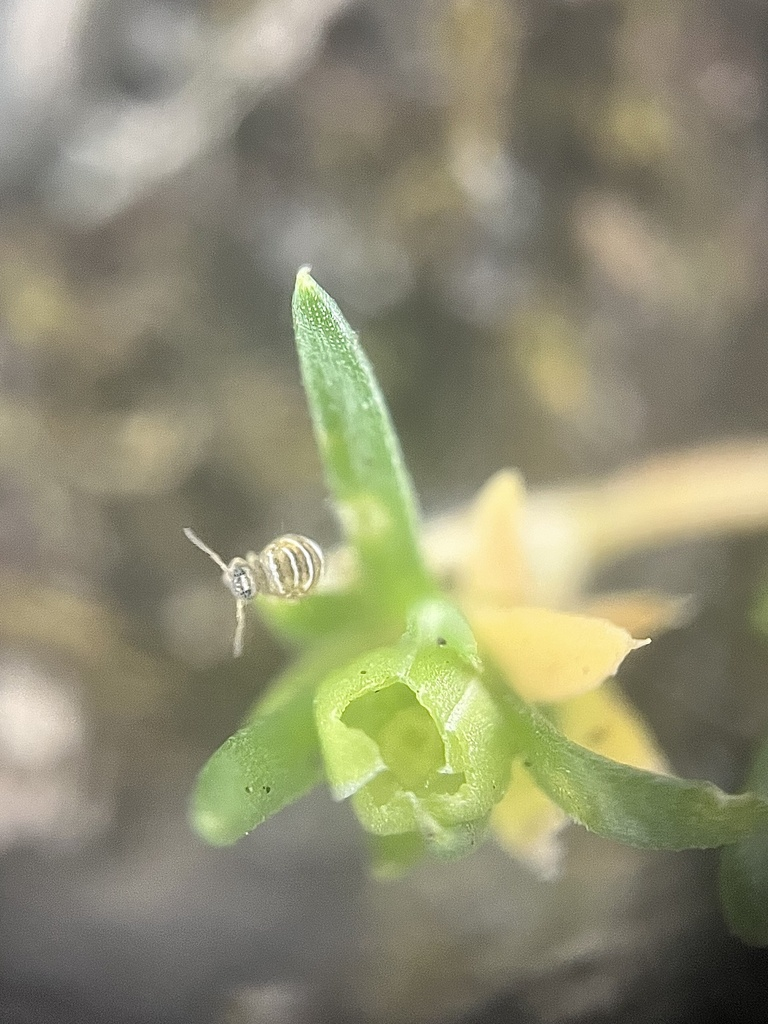

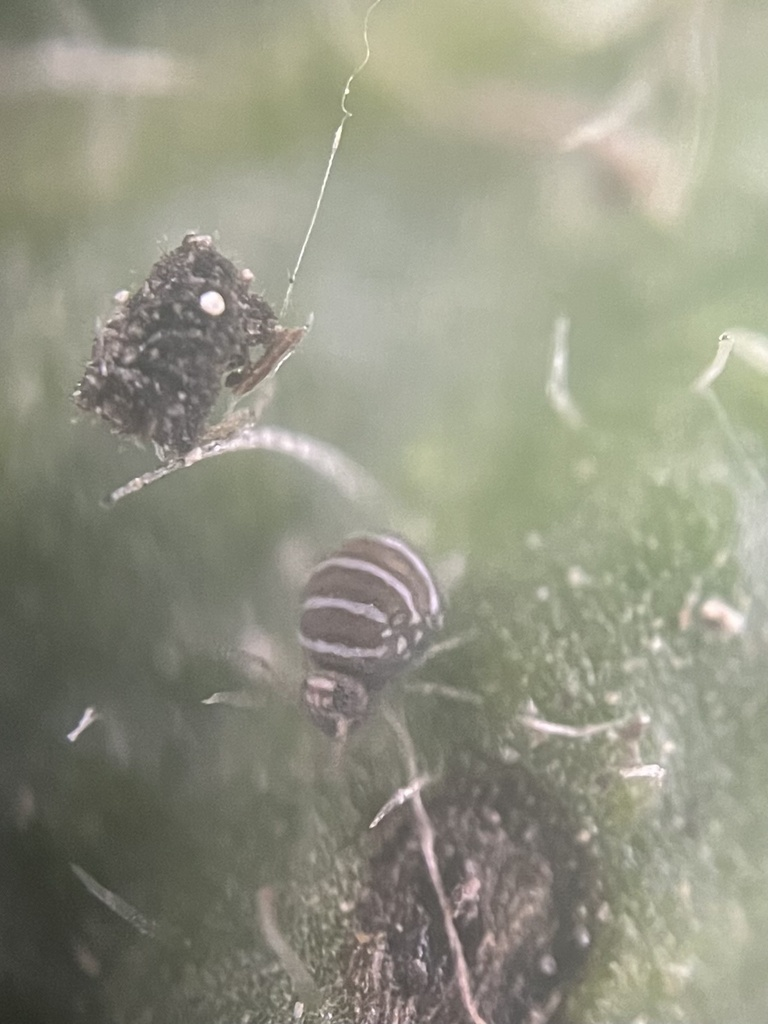

Scientific classification
- Kingdom: Animalia
- Phylum: Arthropoda
- Clade: Pancrustacea
- Class: Collembola
- Order: Symphypleona
- Family: Bourletiellidae
- Genus: Fasciosminthurus
- Species: F. quinquefasciatus

Binomial name
- Fasciosminthurus quinquefasciatus (Krausbauer, 1898)

= Fasciosminthurus quinquefasciatus =

Species of springtail

Fasciosminthurus quinquefasciatus, the zebra springtail, is a species of Eurasian springtail in the genus Fasciosminthurus that has spread to many countries around the world, including North America.

== Appearance ==
This species is characterized by a brown body, and white stripes, that have been compared to a zebra's patterning. The white stripes also are in many cases outlined by black stripes. The antennae have 4 segments.

== Diet ==
This species feeds off of wood and dead plant matter, favoring live plants over wood.

== Habitat ==
This species is for the most part found in gravel trails or similar urban localities.

== Original description ==
this species was described by Theodor Krausbauer in 1898. It was originally placed as Sminthurus quinquefasciatus in the scientific publication Neue Collembola aus der Umgebung von Weilburg an der Lahn.

== Taxonomic changes ==
this species was transferred to the Bourletiellidae when it was placed into the genus Fasciosminthurus from the genus Sminthurus in the year 1960.
