= Aleksis =

- Gender: Male or Female

Other names
- See also: Alexis

Aleksis is a given name, and may refer to:

- Aleksis Dreimanis (born 1914), award-winning Quaternary geologist
- Aleksis Kivi (1834–1872), Finnish author

== See also ==
- Aleksy (disambiguation)
- Alexey (disambiguation)
- Alexis (disambiguation)
- Alexy (disambiguation)
