= Arve (disambiguation) =

Arve can refer to:

== People ==
Given name

- Arve Johnsen, politician
- Arve Henriksen, trumpet player
- Arve Isdal, guitarist
- Arve Moen Bergset, folk music performer
- Arve Opsahl, actor and comedian
- Arve Tellefsen, violinist
- Arve Walde, footballer

Surname

- Minna Arve, Finnish politician

== Rivers ==
- Arve, Arve River, France
- Arve River (Tasmania)

== Other ==
- Patria ARVE, a Finnish self-propelled howitzer
