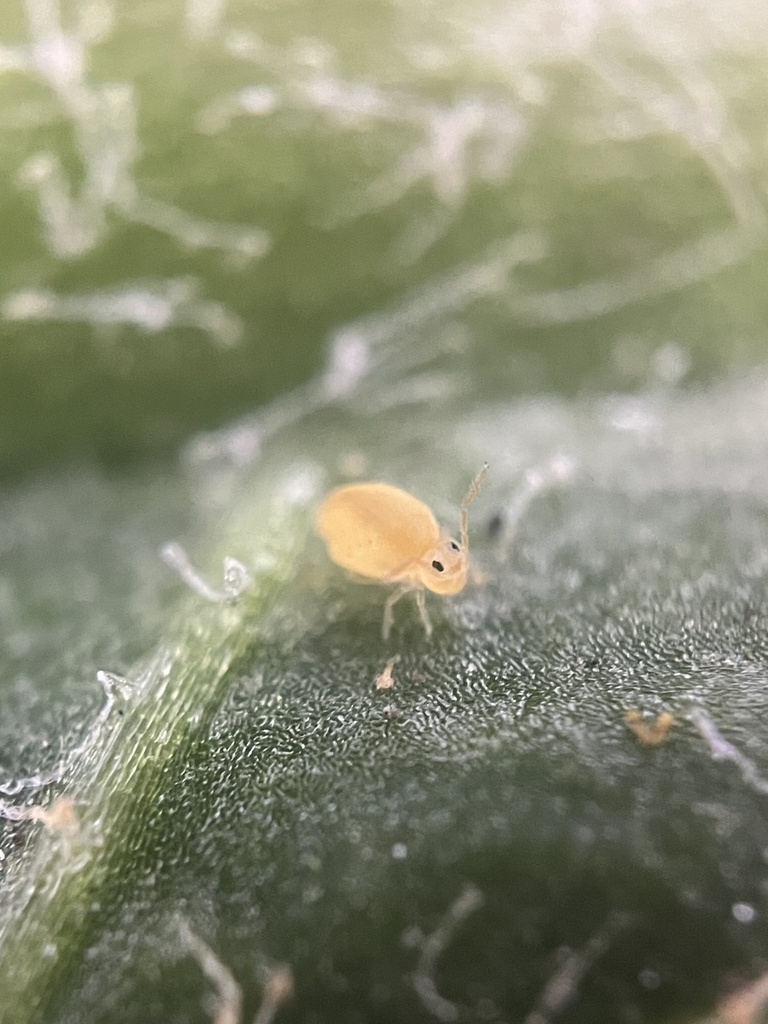
- 1. Deuterosminthurus russatus resting on a common daisy
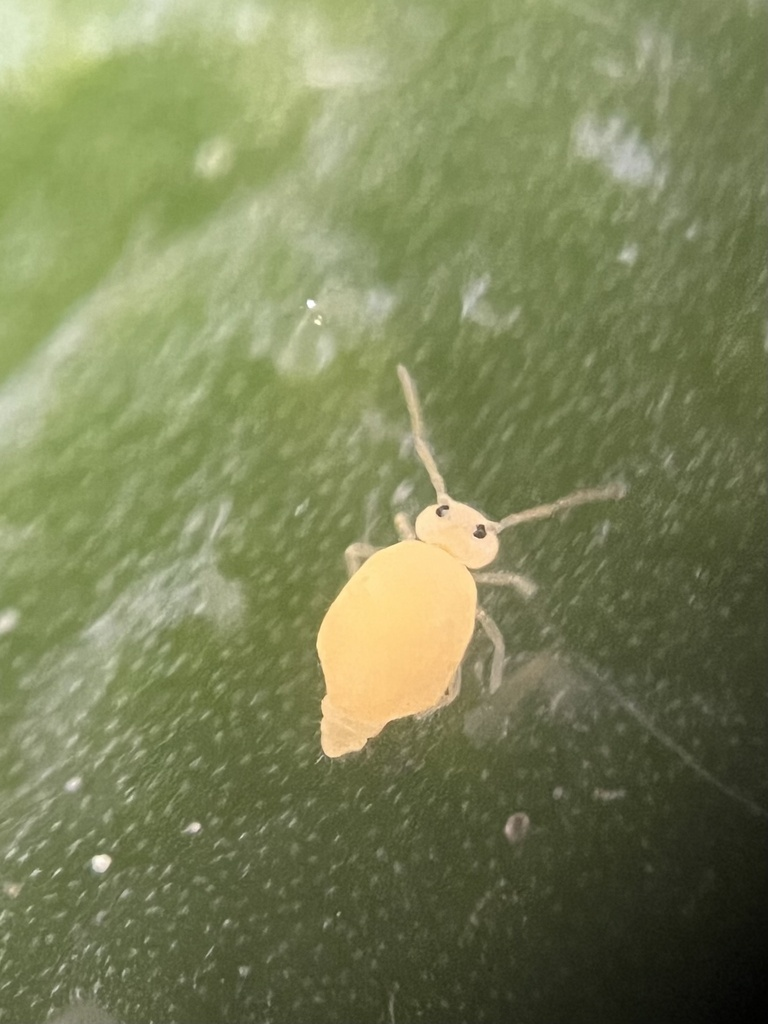
- 2. A photo of Deuterosminthurus russatus showing its bullet shaped body

Scientific classification
- Kingdom: Animalia
- Phylum: Arthropoda
- Clade: Pancrustacea
- Class: Collembola
- Order: Symphypleona
- Family: Bourletiellidae
- Genus: Deuterosminthurus
- Species: D. russatus

Binomial name
- Deuterosminthurus russatus (Maynard, 1951)

Synonyms
- Bourletiella russata Maynard, 1951

= Deuterosminthurus russatus =

Species of springtail

Deuterosminthurus russatus is a species of globular springtail in the genus Deuterosminthurus commonly ranging from Western North America to Canada. This species is less well recorded in the east coast of the United States. It is a transitory epineuston, which means it can survive on the water's surface (and therefore can be found in lakes and other freshwater bodies) but only travels there by accident, perhaps due to rain carrying it away from its preferred habitat, since it floats.

== Appearance ==
This species is overall yellow, with white sideburns. It is bullet shaped, and has fuzzy ended antenna which are four segmented. the basal antennal segment is the smallest of them all. Some Deuterosminthurus russatus have raccoon eyes.

== Color forms ==
In Canada, there has been a rare red color form found of this species, which was discovered when the microscopic features of this species, which was originally identified via antennal segment, was a complete match.
