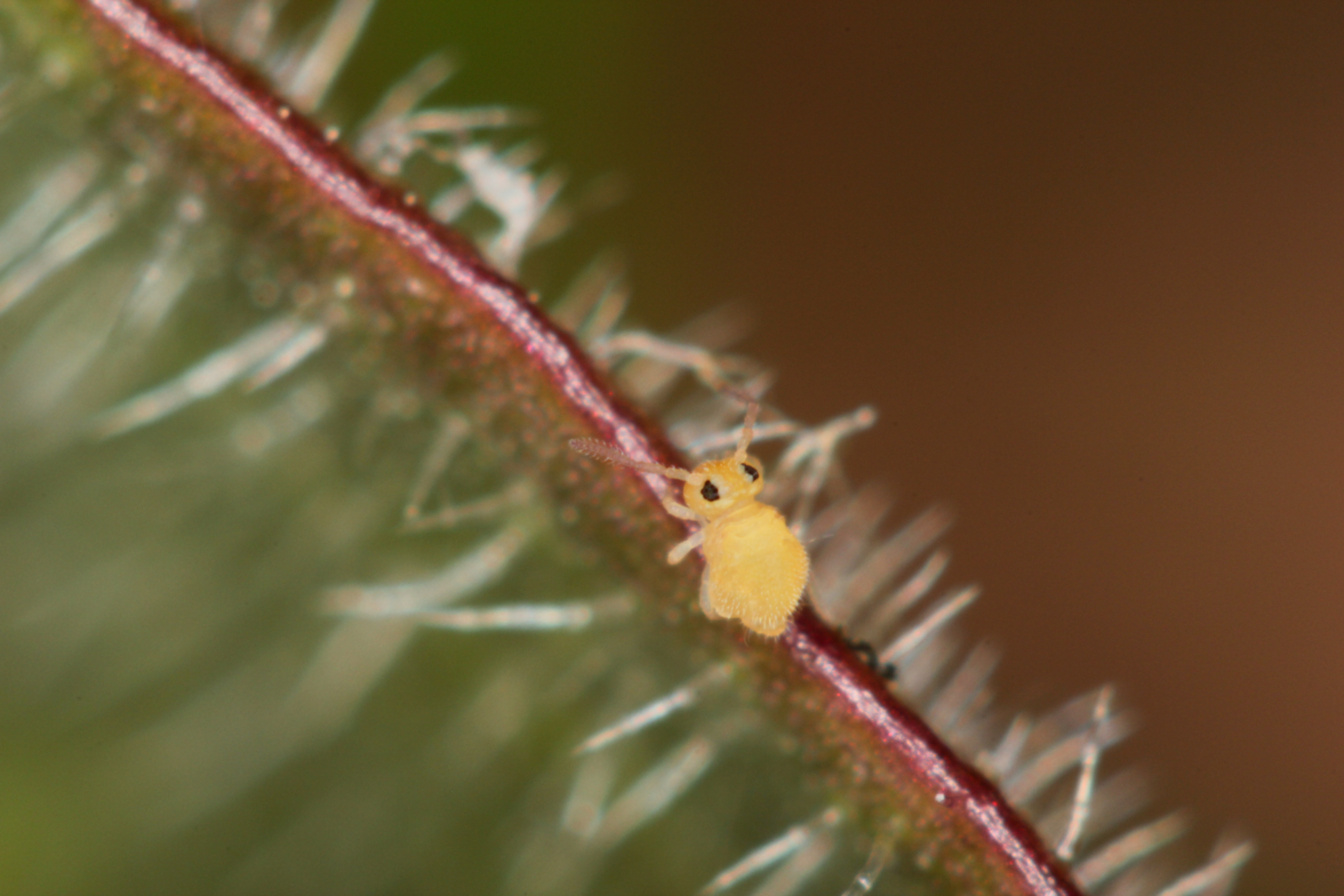
- Bourletiella arvalis

Scientific classification
- Kingdom: Animalia
- Phylum: Arthropoda
- Clade: Pancrustacea
- Class: Collembola
- Order: Symphypleona
- Family: Bourletiellidae
- Genus: Bourletiella; Banks, 1899

= Bourletiella =

Genus of springtails

Bourletiella is a genus of springtails of the family Bourletiellidae of the suborder Symphypleona.

== Species ==
- Bourletiella aquatica Maynard, 1951
- Bourletiella arvalis (Fitch, 1863)
- Bourletiella christianseni Snider, 1978
- Bourletiella coalingaensis Snider, 1978
- Bourletiella dreisbachi (Snider, 1969)
- Bourletiella hortensis (Fitch, 1863) – Garden springtail
- Bourletiella ihu Christiansen & Bellinger, 1992
- Bourletiella insula Folsom, 1932
- Bourletiella juanitae Maynard, 1951
- Bourletiella lippsoni Snider, 1978
- Bourletiella lurida Snider, 1978
- Bourletiella millsi Pedigo, 1968
- Bourletiella nonfasciata Snider, 1978
- Bourletiella polena Christiansen and Bellinger, 1992
- Bourletiella repanda Agren, 1903
- Bourletiella russata Maynard, 1951
- Bourletiella rustica Maynard, 1951
- Bourletiella savona Maynard, 1951
- Bourletiella spinata (Macgillivray, 1893)
- Bourletiella validentata Snider, 1978
- Bourletiella viridescens Stach, 1920
- Bourletiella wexfordensis (Snider, 1969)
- Bourletiella xeromorpha Snider, 1978
