= Bourletiella juanitae =

Scientific classification
- Domain: Eukaryota
- Kingdom: Animalia
- Phylum: Arthropoda
- Class: Collembola
- Order: Symphypleona
- Family: Bourletiellidae
- Genus: Bourletiella
- Species: B. juanitae

Binomial name
- Bourletiella juanitae Maynard, 1951

Synonyms
- Bourletiella fallonae Maynard, 1951

Species of springtail

Bourletiella juanitae is a species of globular springtails, arthropods in the family Bourletiellidae.
