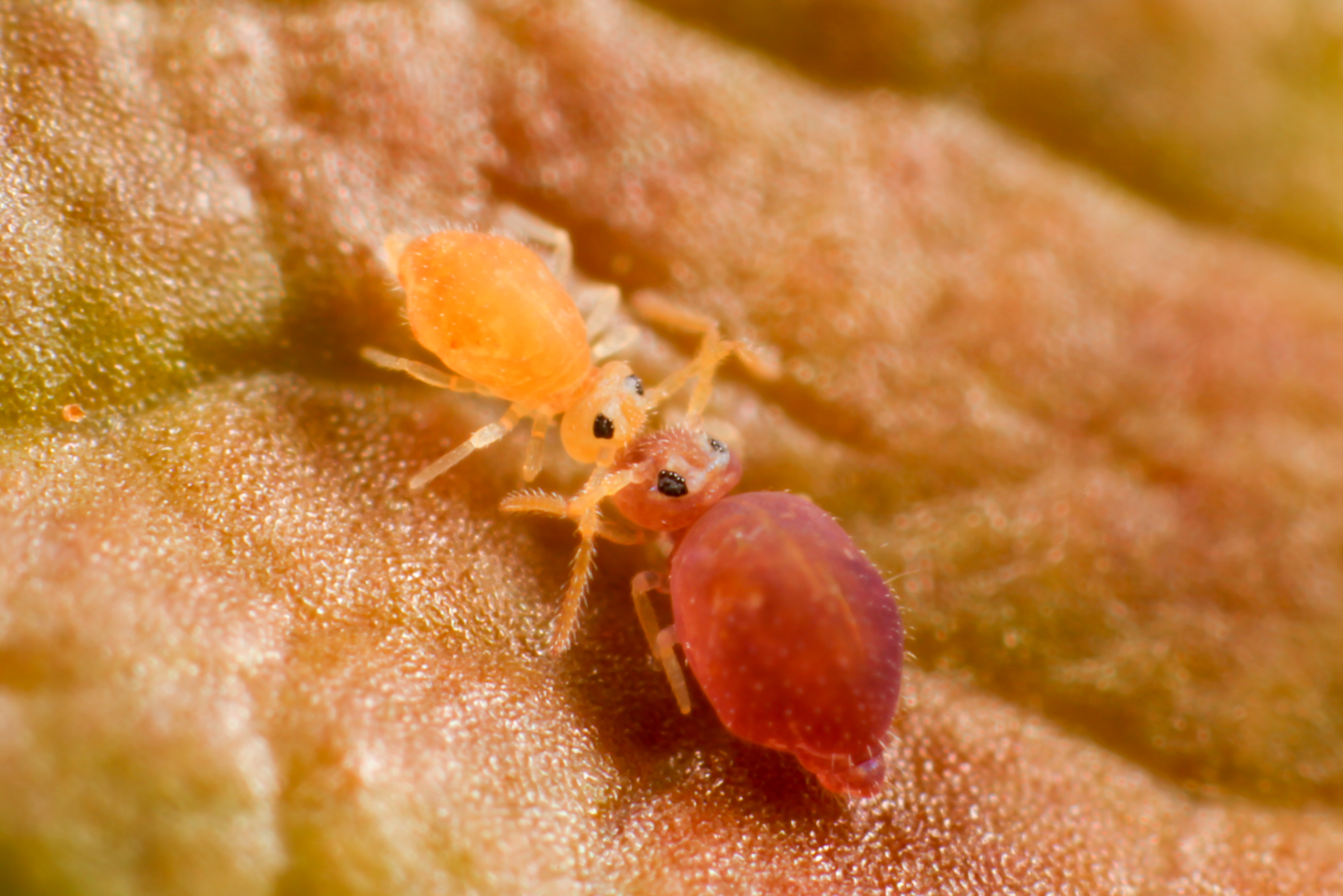
- Deuterosminthurus pallipes courtship ritual

Scientific classification
- Kingdom: Animalia
- Phylum: Arthropoda
- Clade: Pancrustacea
- Class: Collembola
- Order: Symphypleona
- Family: Bourletiellidae
- Genus: Deuterosminthurus
- Species: D. pallipes

Binomial name
- Deuterosminthurus pallipes (Bourlet, 1843)

Synonyms
- Sminthurus repandus Ågren, 1903; Deuterosminthurus mixtus; Deuterosminthurus feneysi; Deuterosminthurus beckeri

= Deuterosminthurus pallipes =

Species of globular springtail

Deuterosminthurus pallipes is a species of globular springtail belonging to the family Bourletiellidae. First described by Bourlet in 1843, the species is notable for its high degree of color polymorphism across different geographical and climatic populations.

== Taxonomy and systematics ==
Originally described as a dark form by Bourlet in 1843, Deuterosminthurus pallipes holds chronological priority over several forms previously treated as distinct species or subspecies. Detailed morphological analysis by taxonomists consolidated D. repandus (Ågren, 1903), D. mixtus, D. feneysi, and D. beckeri into synonyms of D. pallipes, demonstrating that their defining traits merely represent continuous variations in color and localized setal counts.

D. pallipes is closely related to Deuterosminthurus maculatus. While the two species occasionally occur syntopically, they maintain distinct genetic boundaries; D. maculatus exhibits a rigid, constant pattern of sharply outlined markings (maculae), whereas D. pallipes shows highly diffuse, continuously variable coloration. No intermediate color forms between the two have been observed.

== Description ==
Deuterosminthurus pallipes is a small arthropod exhibiting sexual dimorphism in both size and coloration. Adults measure as follows:

- Males: 0.45 to 0.55 mm in length.
- Females: 0.60 to 0.75 mm in length.

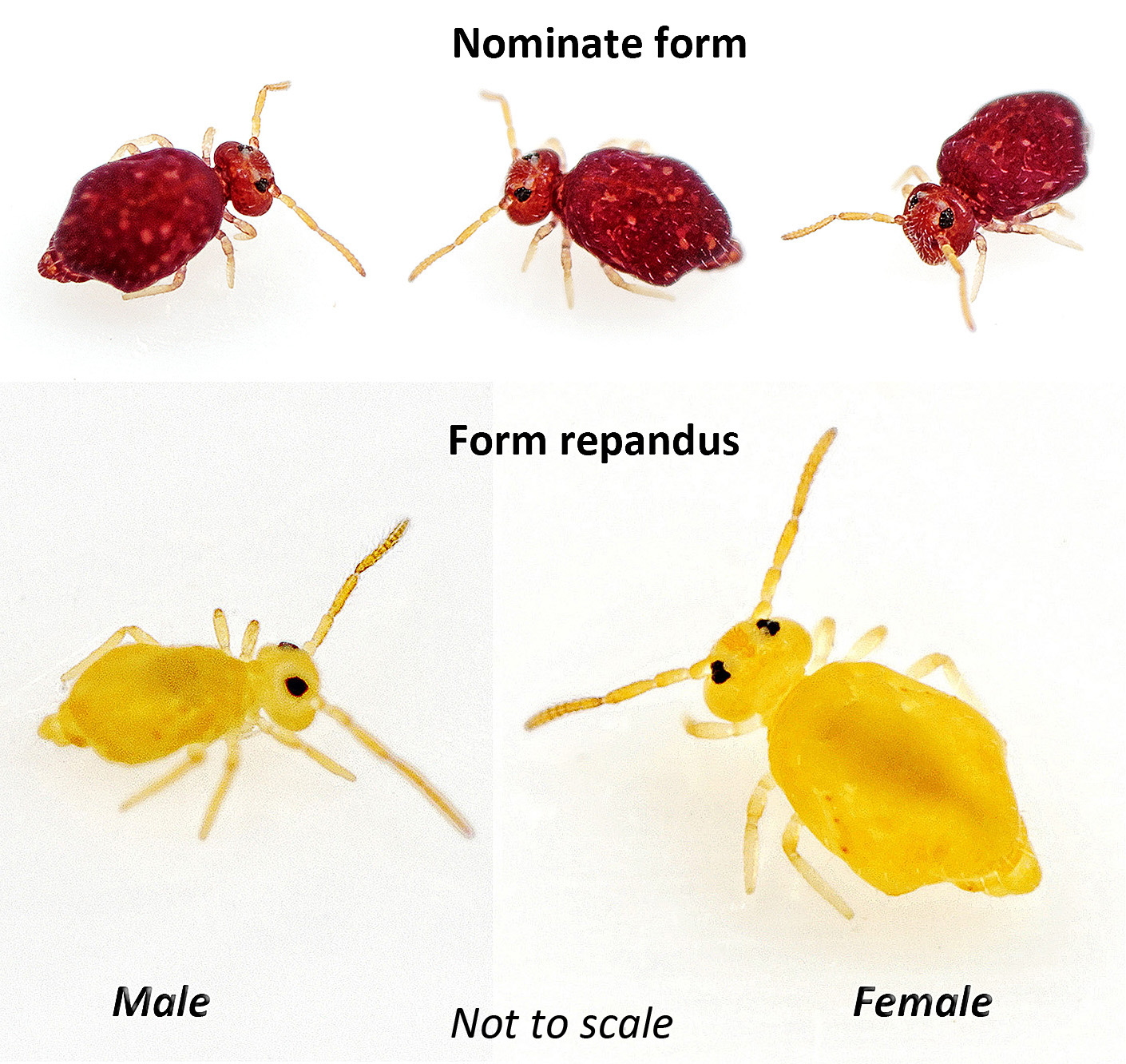
Polymorphism of Deuterosminthurus pallipes

=== Coloration ===
The species is highly variable in color, heavily influenced by regional climatic zones. Males are generally more vividly or deeply pigmented than females.

- Atlantic populations: Features a mix of two distinct color morphs: a uniform light yellow form (formerly described as repandus) and a rare, dark blue-purple form featuring pale legs, mouthparts, and furcula (the typical pallipes form).
- Mediterranean populations: Males vary from orange-flecked to entirely dark red. Females are typically yellow with diffuse orange or ochre spots. The surround of the eyepatches often remains light.
- Mountain populations: Alpine specimens found feeding or living on alpine rose (Rhododendron ferrugineum) exhibit a deep wine-red coloration.
- General features: Regardless of local morphs, the eyepatches remain black, the antennae range from yellow to brown, the legs are light yellow, and the furcula is white.

=== Anatomy and diagnostic features ===
Like all members of its genus, Deuterosminthurus pallipes possesses a highly distinctive arrangement of eight ocelli on the black eyespot, organized into three distinct rows: a top row of three large ocelli, a single small central ocellus, and a bottom row of four "normal" ocelli.

While generally globular, the body shape of D. pallipes tends to be more elongated than closely related taxa. Immature individuals with underdeveloped gonads often display a noticeably more angular body shape. The antennae are exceptionally long, stretching nearly to the length of the entire body. The species exhibits sexual dimorphism in its antennal proportions, with the antennae of males being distinctly longer relative to their body length than those of females.

Several microscopic and chaetotaxic features serve to distinguish D. pallipes from other springtails:

- Legs: On the third pair of legs, all setae located on the outer side of the tibiotarsus are of approximately uniform length.
- Claws: The apical filament of the inner claw (the unguiculus or empodium) is positioned apically.
- Abdomen: Males lack the long, specialized, backward-pointing setae typically found on the posterior end of the sixth abdominal segment in some related species.
- Anal setae: In females, the setae surrounding the anus are all of an identical thickness.

== Distribution and habitat ==
Deuterosminthurus pallipes is widely distributed across Western Europe, with documented populations spanning Atlantic, Mediterranean, and mountainous alpine microclimates.

It is an epigeic species, typically collected by sweeping vegetation with nets. It utilizes a wide variety of host plants and habitats, including limestone grasslands, low-altitude scrublands, and alpine meadows. Documented botanical associations include grasses such as Bromus erectus, Molinia caerulea, and Festuca, low-growing herbs like Lotus corniculatus and Eryngium campestre, as well as woody shrubs like Quercus ilex (holm oak) and Rhododendron ferrugineum.
