= Alexi =

Alexi is a given name that is a variant or nickname of Alexander or Alexandra. Notable people with the name include:

== Men ==
- Alexi Casilla (born 1984), full name Alexi Casilla Lora, American baseball player
- Alexi Giannoulias (born 1976), full name Alexander Giannoulias, American politician
- Alexi Grewal (born 1960), Indian-American road racing cyclist
- Alexi Ivanov (1922–1997), Bulgarian politician, birth name Alexe Bădărău
- Alexi Kaye Campbell, Greek-American playwright and actor
- Alexi Laiho (1979–2020), full name Markku Uula Aleksi Laiho, Finnish singer, composer, and guitarist of the death metal band Children of Bodom
- Alexi Lalas (born 1970), American soccer player
- Alexi Murdoch, British singer-songwriter
- Alexi Ogando (born 1983), American baseball player
- Alexi Zentner, Canadian-American author

== Women ==
- Alexi Spann (born 1986), American swimmer

== See also ==
- Alexey (includes Aleksei, Aleksey, Alexei)
- Aleksi
- Alexis (disambiguation)
