= Spanish broom =

Spanish broom may refer to:

- Genista hispanica, a low-growing spiny shrub
- Spartium junceum, a shrub
