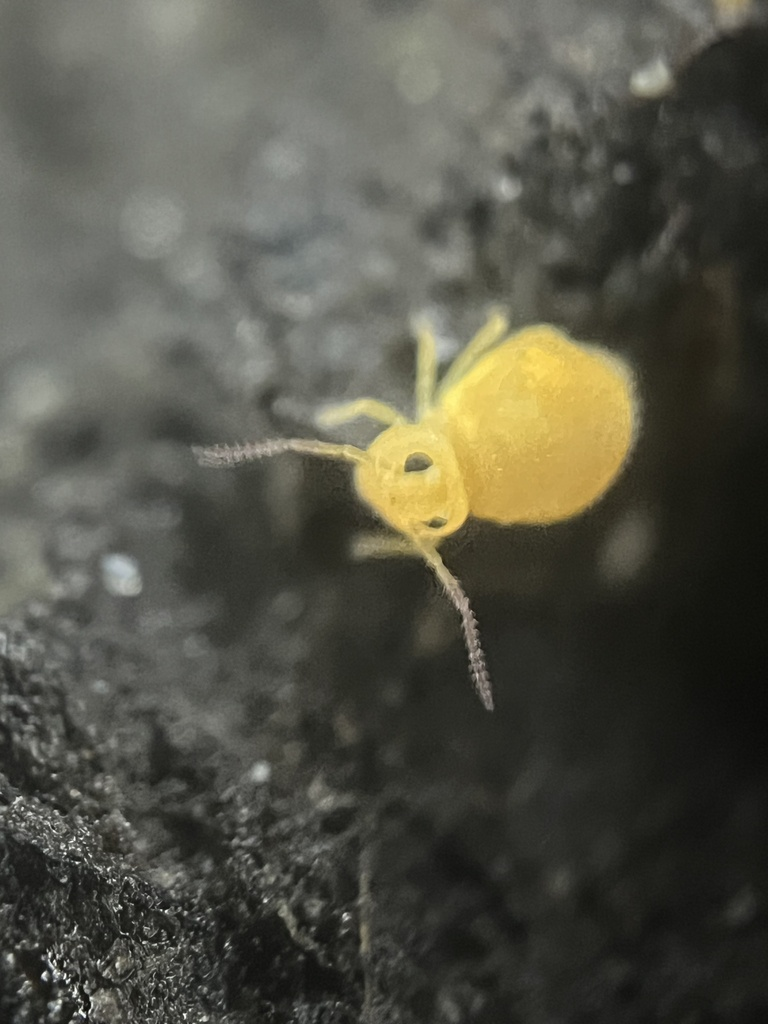
- Bourletiella arvalis in the soil, near Deadhorse Canyon, WA

Scientific classification
- Kingdom: Animalia
- Phylum: Arthropoda
- Class: Collembola
- Order: Symphypleona
- Family: Bourletiellidae
- Genus: Bourletiella
- Species: B. arvalis

Binomial name
- Bourletiella arvalis (Fitch, 1863)

Synonyms
- Bourletiella luteus Schott, 1891; Smynthurus arvalis Fitch, 1863

= Bourletiella arvalis =

Species of springtail

Bourletiella arvalis is a species of globular springtails in the family Bourletiellidae.

It is yellow to orange in coloration with purple tipped antenna, that are distinctly pronged.

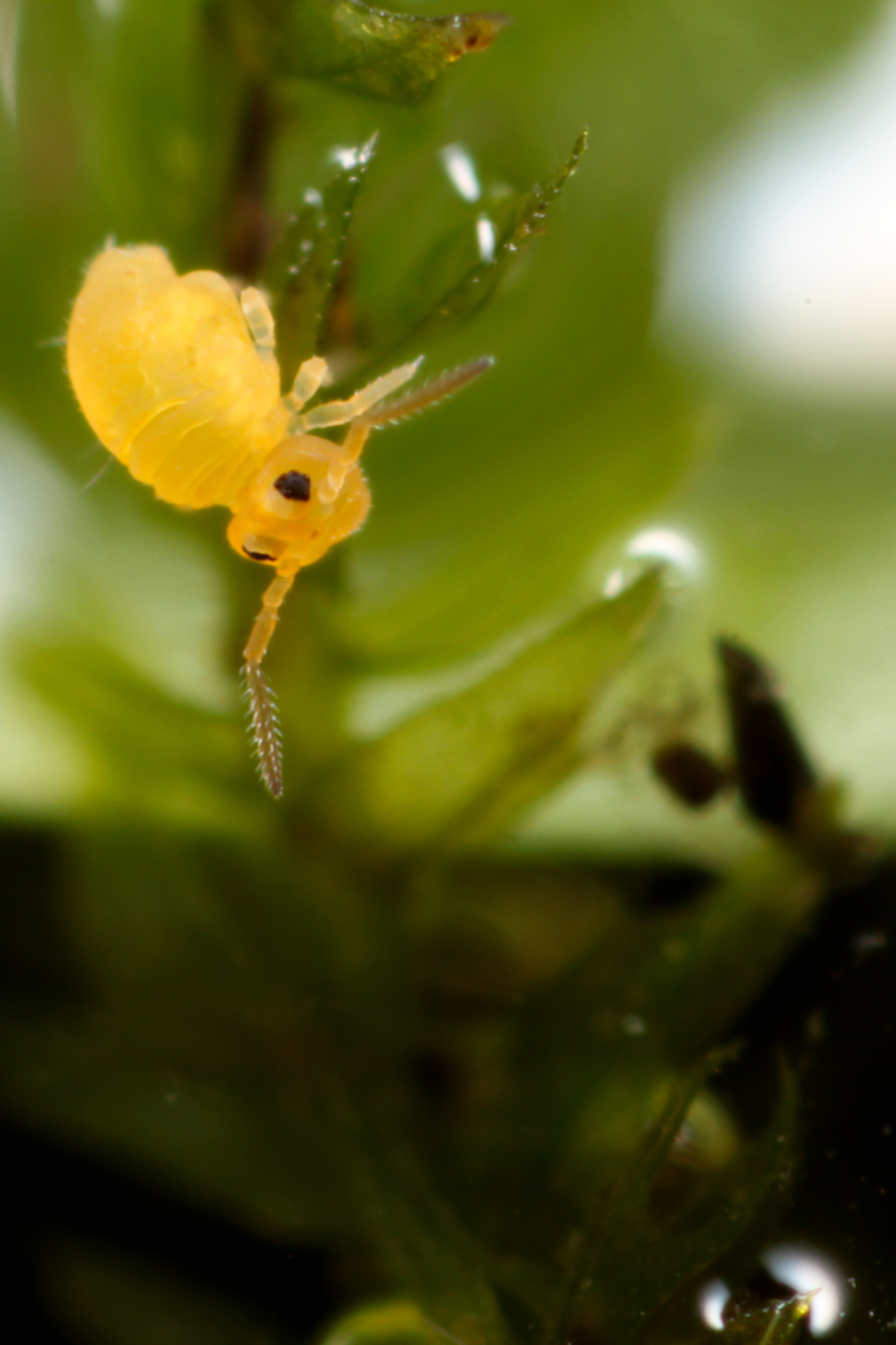
