= Coat of arms of Turku =

- Armiger: Minna Arve, Mayor of Turku
- Adopted: 1309

The coat of arms of the city of Turku is based on a medieval seal dating back to 1309. The gothic letter "A" is based on the Latin name of the city, "Aboa". Fleur-de-lis is a symbol often depicted on coats of arms and it symbolises the Virgin Mary, to whom the Turku Cathedral is consecrated to.
