= Aleki =

Aleki is a given name. Notable people with the name include:

- Aleki Morris-Lome (born 1994), New Zealand rugby union player
- Aleki Lutui (born 1978), Tongan rugby union player

== See also ==
- Alek
- Alexi
