= Deuterosminthurus =

Scientific classification
- Kingdom: Animalia
- Phylum: Arthropoda
- Clade: Pancrustacea
- Class: Collembola
- Order: Symphypleona
- Family: Bourletiellidae
- Genus: Deuterosminthurus; Börner, 1901

Genus of springtails

Deuterosminthurus is a genus of springtails belonging to the family Bourletiellidae. It has a cosmopolitan distribution and lives in plant litter, epiphytes and forest canopies.

== Species ==
Species:

- Deuterosminthurus bicinctus (Koch, 1840)
- Deuterosminthurus bisetosus (Baquero, Moraza & Jordana, 2003)
- Deuterosminthurus caeruleacaudus (Scott, 1965)
- Deuterosminthurus delatorrei (Palacios-Vargas & González, 1995)
- Deuterosminthurus doriae (Parona, 1884)
- Deuterosminthurus ezoensis (Yosii, 1972)
- Deuterosminthurus fenyensis (Stach, 1926)
- Deuterosminthurus kugleri (Bretfeld, 2000)
- Deuterosminthurus luridus (Snider, 1978)
- Deuterosminthurus maculatus (Nayrolles, 1996)
- Deuterosminthurus mediterraneus (Ellis, 1974)
- Deuterosminthurus nonfasciatus (Snider, 1978)
- Deuterosminthurus okinawanus (Yosii, 1965)
- Deuterosminthurus pallipes (Bourlet, 1843)
- Deuterosminthurus pleuracanthus (Nayrolles, 1996)
- Deuterosminthurus polenus (Christiansen & Bellinger, 1992)
- Deuterosminthurus propallipes (Börner, 1901)
- Deuterosminthurus prospathaceus (Rapoport, 1963)
- Deuterosminthurus quadrangulatus (Loksa & Bogojevic, 1970)
- Deuterosminthurus russatus (Maynard, 1951)
- Deuterosminthurus separatus (Arlé, 1943)
- Deuterosminthurus serratus (Kang & Lee, 2005)
- Deuterosminthurus spec (Maynard, 1951)
- Deuterosminthurus sulphureus (Koch, 1840)
- Deuterosminthurus tristani (Denis, 1933)
- Deuterosminthurus yumanensis (Wray, 1967)
