= Alexy =

Alexy is a surname. Notable people with the surname include:

- A.J. Alexy (born 1998), American baseball player
- Gillian Alexy (born 1986), Australian actress
- Janko Alexy (1894–1970), Slovak painter, writer and publicist
- Robert Alexy (1945–2026), German jurist and philosopher

== See also ==
- Aleksis
- Aleksy
- Alexey
- Alexie
- Alexis (disambiguation)
