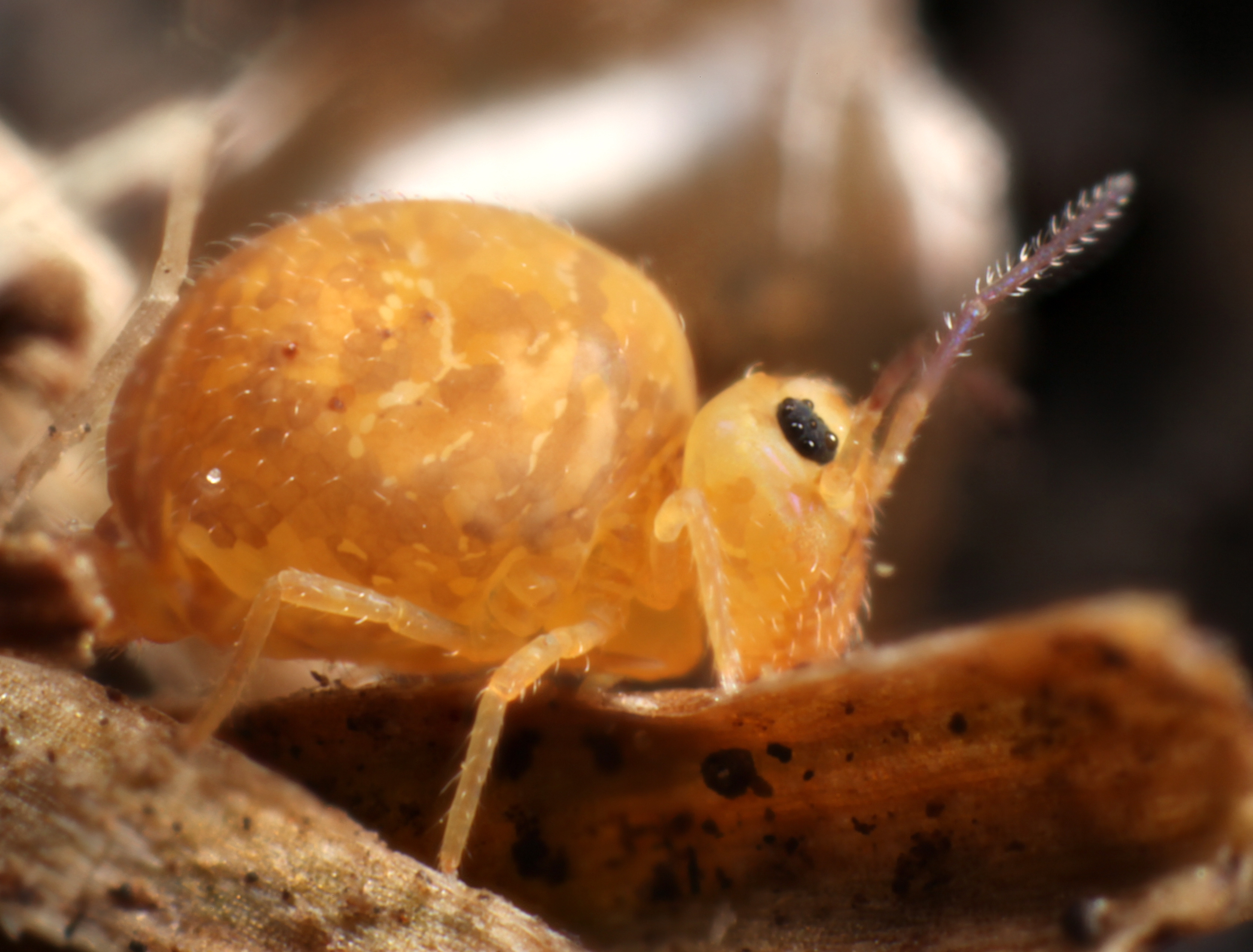

Scientific classification
- Kingdom: Animalia
- Phylum: Arthropoda
- Clade: Pancrustacea
- Class: Collembola
- Order: Symphypleona
- Family: Bourletiellidae
- Genus: Bourletiella
- Species: B. hortensis

Binomial name
- Bourletiella hortensis (Fitch, 1863)

= Bourletiella hortensis =

Species of arthropods

Bourletiella hortensis is a springtail of the family Bourletiellidae. The species common name is garden springtail. It feeds on moss and fungi.
