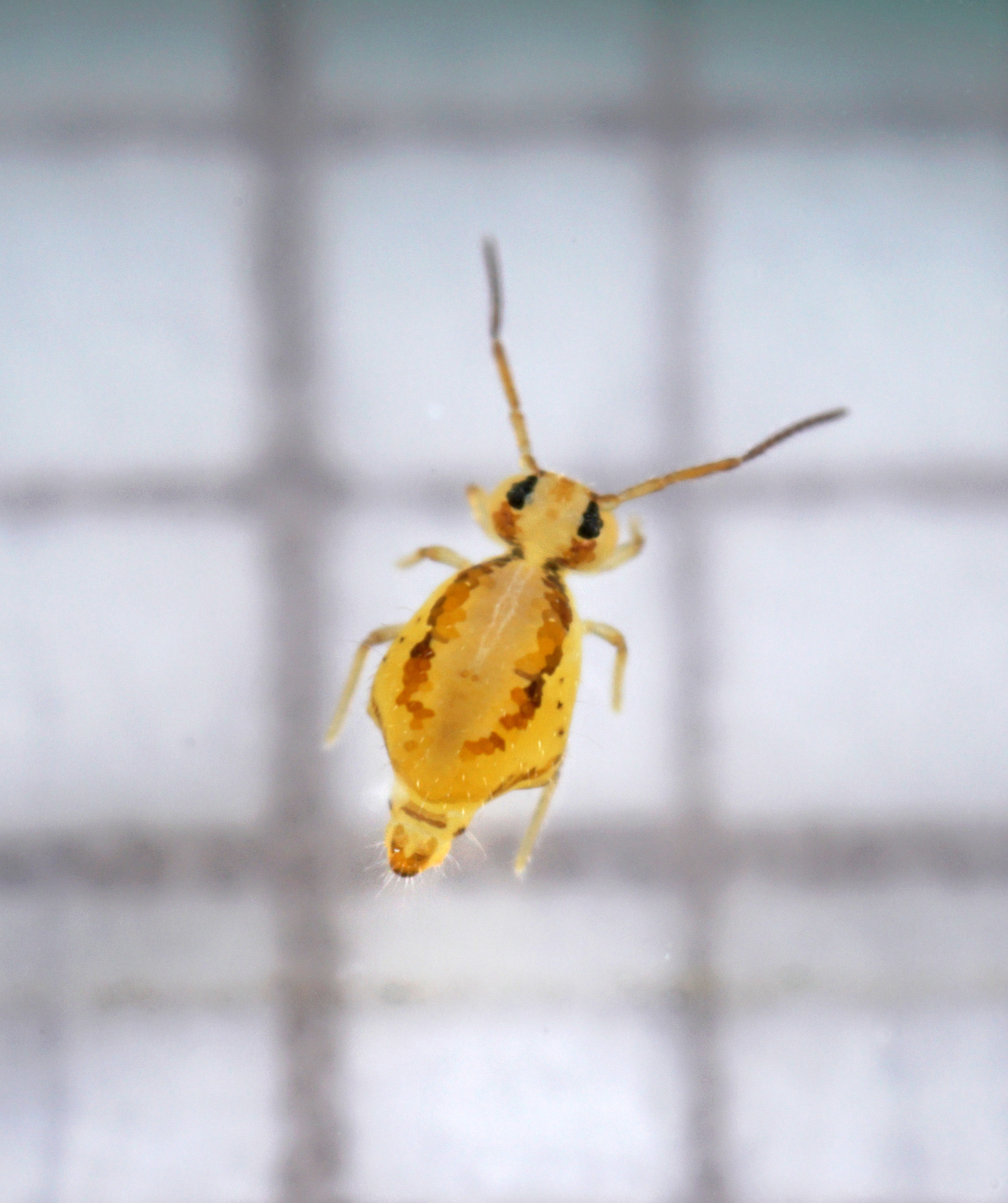
- Individual of Heterosminthurus bilineatus

Scientific classification
- Kingdom: Animalia
- Phylum: Arthropoda
- Clade: Pancrustacea
- Class: Collembola
- Order: Symphypleona
- Family: Bourletiellidae
- Genus: Heterosminthurus; Stach, 1955

= Heterosminthurus =

Genus of springtails

Heterosminthurus is a genus of springtails belonging to the family Bourletiellidae.

The species of this genus are found in Europe and Northern America.

Species:

- Heterosminthurus aquaticus (Maynard, 1951)
- Heterosminthurus bilineatus (Bourlet, 1842)
- Heterosminthurus borealis Bretfeld & Zöllner, 2000
- Heterosminthurus chaetocephalus Huther, 1971
- Heterosminthurus claviger (Gisin, 1958)
- Heterosminthurus difusus (Gisin, 1962)
- Heterosminthurus dreisbachi (Snider, 1969)
- Heterosminthurus ihu Christiansen & Bellinger, 1992
- Heterosminthurus insignis (Reuter, 1876)
- Heterosminthurus kiianus Yoshii & Sawada, 1997
- Heterosminthurus koontzi Snider & Calandrino, 1987
- Heterosminthurus linnaniemii (Stach, 1920)
- Heterosminthurus multiornatus Bretfeld & Zöllner, 2000
- Heterosminthurus nonlineatus (Gisin, 1946)
- Heterosminthurus novemlineatus (Tullberg, 1871)
- Heterosminthurus nymphes Yosii, 1970
- Heterosminthurus pirika Yosii, 1972
- Heterosminthurus punctatus Bretfeld, 1996
- Heterosminthurus putoranae Bretfeld, 2000
- Heterosminthurus quadristringatus Bretfeld, 2000
- Heterosminthurus setiger Gisin, 1961
- Heterosminthurus spec Bourlet, 1842
- Heterosminthurus stebaevae Bretfeld, 1996
- Heterosminthurus umbonicus Bretfeld, 2000
- Heterosminthurus undulans Yosii, Lee, & C-E, 1963
- Heterosminthurus undulatus (Hammer, 1953)
