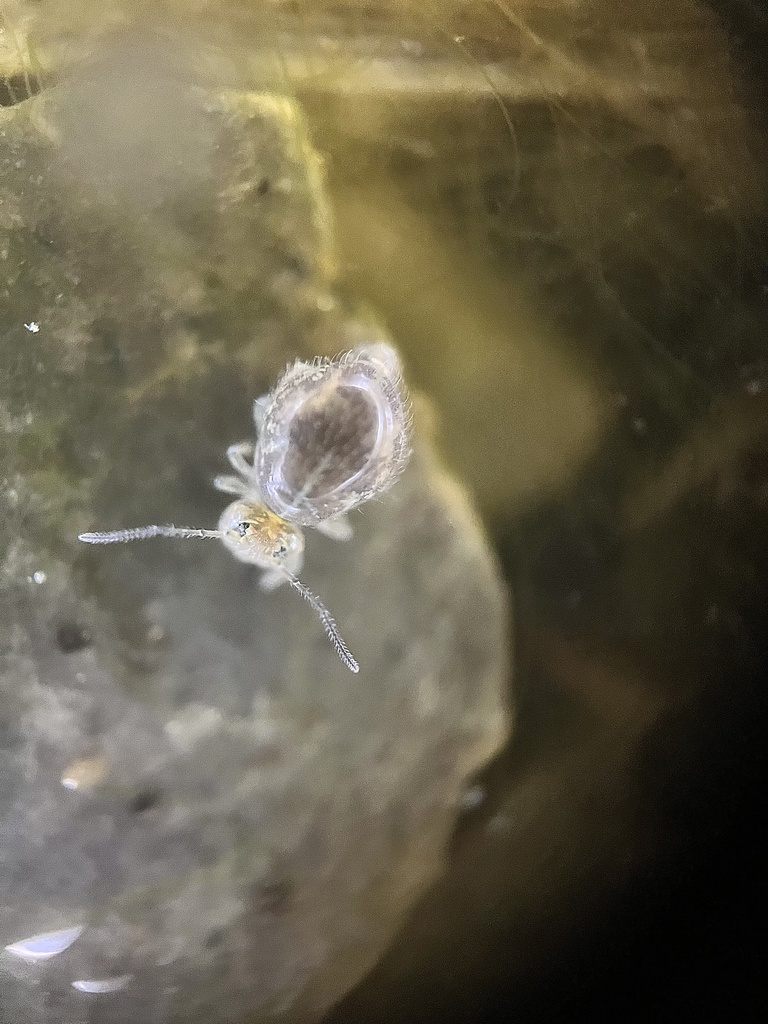

Scientific classification
- Kingdom: Animalia
- Phylum: Arthropoda
- Clade: Pancrustacea
- Class: Collembola
- Order: Symphypleona
- Family: Bourletiellidae
- Genus: Pseudobourletiella
- Species: P. spinata

Binomial name
- Pseudobourletiella spinata (MacGillivray, 1893)

= Pseudobourletiella =

Species of springtail

Pseudobourletiella is a monotypic genus of springtails in the family Bourletiellidae. Its only species is Pseudobourletiella spinata, which is found in North America, and has spread to Asia.

This species is found on the still water of lakes in the summer months, using water tension to stay upright on the water, and feeding off algae and submerged wood.

These are generally green, grey, dark purple or brown in coloration. They each have a white cross near the head. The antennae are yellow with purple colored semi hairy tips.

In Maryland there has been a color form that is metallic blue confirmed and spotted.
