= Alta IF =

Norwegian sports club

Alta
- Full name: Alta Idrettsforening
- Founded: 29 May 1927; 99 years ago
- Ground: Alta Idrettspark, Finnmarkshallen
- Capacity: 3,000
- Chairman: Tron Møller Natland
- Head coach: Mate Dujilo
- League: 2. divisjon
- 2025: 2. divisjon group 2, 13th of 14 (relegated)
Home colours	Away colours

Alta Idrettsforening is a sports club from the town of Alta in Alta Municipality in Finnmark county, Norway. The club is most known for its association football department, which played in the 1. divisjon until 2014.The club was newly promoted for the 2008 season; its last stint up to that time in the division came in 2005, when they finished last. The team finished 14th in the 2009 season. In 2012 a new relegation came after finishing last once again. It took them only one year to come back.

They play at Alta Idrettspark, or indoor at Finnmarkshallen when snow and other weather conditions render the pitch unusable. Their attendance record of about 3,000 was set in 1995 against Rosenborg. Notable former players include Trond Fredrik Ludvigsen, Tore Reginiussen and Morten Gamst Pedersen.

On December 11, 2018, Alta I.F signed Bryant Lazaro as the head coach, appointed to start January 1, 2019.

== Recent history ==
Season		Pos.	Pl.	W	D	L	GS	GA	P	Cup	Notes
2001	2. divisjon	5	26	13	1	12	60	57	40	Second round	
2002	2. divisjon	↑ 1	26	18	2	6	79	38	56	Third round	Promoted to the 1. divisjon
2003	1. divisjon	↓ 16	30	3	4	23	31	76	13	Second round	Relegated to the 2. divisjon
2004	2. divisjon	↑ 1	26	21	0	5	95	21	63	First round	Promoted to the 1. divisjon
2005	1. divisjon	↓ 16	30	5	5	20	28	62	20	Fourth round	Relegated to the 2. divisjon
2006	2. divisjon	2	26	16	6	4	75	36	54	First round	
2007	2. divisjon	↑ 1	26	16	4	6	71	37	52	Third round	Promoted to the 1. divisjon
2008	1. divisjon	14	30	8	2	20	49	66	26	Third round	
2009	1. divisjon	6	30	12	6	12	50	49	42	Fourth round	
2010	1. divisjon	8	28	10	6	12	41	51	36	Third round	
2011	1. divisjon	11	30	10	9	11	45	51	39	Quarter-final	
2012	1. divisjon	↓ 16	30	4	10	16	30	61	21	Third round	Relegated to the 2. divisjon
2013	2. divisjon	↑ 1	26	18	3	5	71	35	57	Fourth round	Promoted to the 1. divisjon
2014	1. divisjon	↓ 13	30	9	7	14	33	51	34	Second round	Relegated to the 2. divisjon
2015	2. divisjon	6	26	12	6	8	65	43	42	First round	
2016	2. divisjon	7	26	12	4	10	58	44	40	Third round	
2017	2. divisjon	4	26	13	7	6	42	24	46	Second round	
2018	2. divisjon	5	26	14	3	9	39	28	45	Third round	
2019	2. divisjon	6	26	12	5	9	44	41	41	Third round	
2020	2. divisjon	4	17	9	2	6	33	26	29	Cancelled	
2021	2. divisjon	6	26	12	5	9	49	47	41	Third round	
2022	2. divisjon	7	26	10	6	10	38	45	36	Second round	
2023	2. divisjon	6	26	12	3	11	51	53	39	Third round	
2024	2. divisjon	10	26	8	8	10	58	51	32	Third round	
2025	2. divisjon	↓ 13	26	5	4	17	49	68	19	Third round	Relegated to the 3. divisjon

== Current squad ==
As of 10 August 2025

Note: Flags indicate national team as defined under FIFA eligibility rules; some limited exceptions apply. Players may hold more than one non-FIFA nationality.

No.	Pos.	Nation	Player
1	GK	LVA	Maris Eltermanis
3	DF	UKR	Yegor Smirnov
4	DF	FIN	Samuel Mahlamäki Camacho
5	DF	NOR	Jørgen Steffensen Lamark
8	MF	NOR	Magnus Andersen
9	MF	NOR	Håvard Nome
10	FW	NOR	Marius Larsen
12	DF	NOR	Noah Skum
14	MF	NOR	Felix Jacobsen
15	MF	NOR	Casper Andreas Kleiva (on loan from Tromsø)
16	DF	NOR	Niklas Antonsen
17	MF	NOR	Alexander Degerstrøm
18	FW	NOR	Peder Brekke
19	DF	NOR	Runar Overvik

No.	Pos.	Nation	Player
22	FW	AUS	Zaydan Bello
23	FW	NOR	Christian Reginiussen
24	GK	FIN	Ville Seppä
25	MF	NOR	Kristian Holsbø
26	MF	NOR	Teo Ingilæ (on loan from Bodø/Glimt)
27	FW	NOR	Gabriel Åkesson
29	GK	FIN	Aleksi Honka-Hallila
30	DF	NOR	Tobias Vonheim Norbye (on loan from Tromsø)
32	DF	NOR	Joakim Samuel Andersen
34	GK	NOR	Sindri Huxley Arnason
35	DF	NOR	Felix Mäki-Helander
40	FW	NOR	Jørgen Bull Kristensen
41	FW	NOR	Jørgen André Amundsen

== Former players ==
- (Norway) Jonathan Norbye

== Managers ==
- (Norway) Isak Ole Hætta
