= Alexie =

Alexie can be either a surname or given name. Notable people with the name include:

== Surname ==
- Robert Arthur Alexie (1957–2014), Canadian First Nations novelist and land claim negotiator
- Sherman Alexie (born 1966), American poet, writer, and filmmaker

== Given name ==
- Alexie Gilmore (born 1976), American actress
- Alexie Glass-Kantor, Australian curator and writer

== See also ==
- Alexy
- Alexey
- Aleksy
