= Fasciosminthurus =

Scientific classification
- Kingdom: Animalia
- Phylum: Arthropoda
- Clade: Pancrustacea
- Class: Collembola
- Order: Symphypleona
- Family: Bourletiellidae
- Genus: Fasciosminthurus; Gisin, 1960

Genus of springtails

Fasciosminthurus is a genus of springtails in the family Bourletiellidae. It contains 30 species.

== Species ==
Fasciosminthurus contains the following species:

- Fasciosminthurus albanicus (Stach, 1956)
- Fasciosminthurus angulipunctatus (Loksa & Bogojevic, 1970)
- Fasciosminthurus badikahanus Bretfeld, 2001
- Fasciosminthurus bedosae Nayrolles, 1994
- Fasciosminthurus canariensis (Paclt, 1964)
- Fasciosminthurus cassagnaui Nayrolles, 1994
- Fasciosminthurus circumfasciatus (Stach, 1956)
- Fasciosminthurus coronatus (Betsch, 1977)
- Fasciosminthurus cugnyi (Nayrolles, 1987)
- Fasciosminthurus dictyostigmatus Nayrolles, 1993
- Fasciosminthurus lacazei (Denis, 1924)
- Fasciosminthurus lacunifer Bretfeld, 2001
- Fasciosminthurus longisetus Nayrolles, 1994
- Fasciosminthurus mascaraeus Bretfeld, 2001
- Fasciosminthurus melanocephalus (Dallai, 1966)
- Fasciosminthurus mertensi Bretfeld, 2001
- Fasciosminthurus nairicus Bretfeld, 2001
- Fasciosminthurus niger Bretfeld, 2001
- Fasciosminthurus obtectus Bretfeld, 1992
- Fasciosminthurus perforatus Bretfeld, 2001
- Fasciosminthurus pontignanoi Bretfeld, 1992
- Fasciosminthurus pseudovirgulatus Nayrolles, 1997
- Fasciosminthurus quinquefasciatus (Krausbauer, 1898)
- Fasciosminthurus raynalae (Nayrolles, 1987)
- Fasciosminthurus saportae Nayrolles, 1997
- Fasciosminthurus sauteri (Nayrolles & Lienhard, 1990)
- Fasciosminthurus strasseni (Paclt, 1964)
- Fasciosminthurus strigatus (Stach, 1922)
- Fasciosminthurus tarianus Bretfeld, 2001
- Fasciosminthurus virgulatus (Skorikov, 1899)
