= Aleksi Mäkelä =

Aleksi Mäkelä may refer to:

- Aleksi Mäkelä (director)
- Aleksi Mäkelä (ice hockey, born 1993)
- Aleksi Mäkelä (ice hockey, born 1995)
