= Alexus =

Alexus is a given name and a surname. Notable people with this name include the following:

== Given name ==
- Alexus Laird (born 1993), Seychellois swimmer

== Surname ==
- Ajiona Alexus (born 1996), American actress

== See also ==
- Alexis (disambiguation)
- Alexius
