= Alexis (malting barley) =

Variety of grasses

Alexis is a two-row, spring sown variety of barley commonly used in the production of malt for the brewing industry.

== Development ==
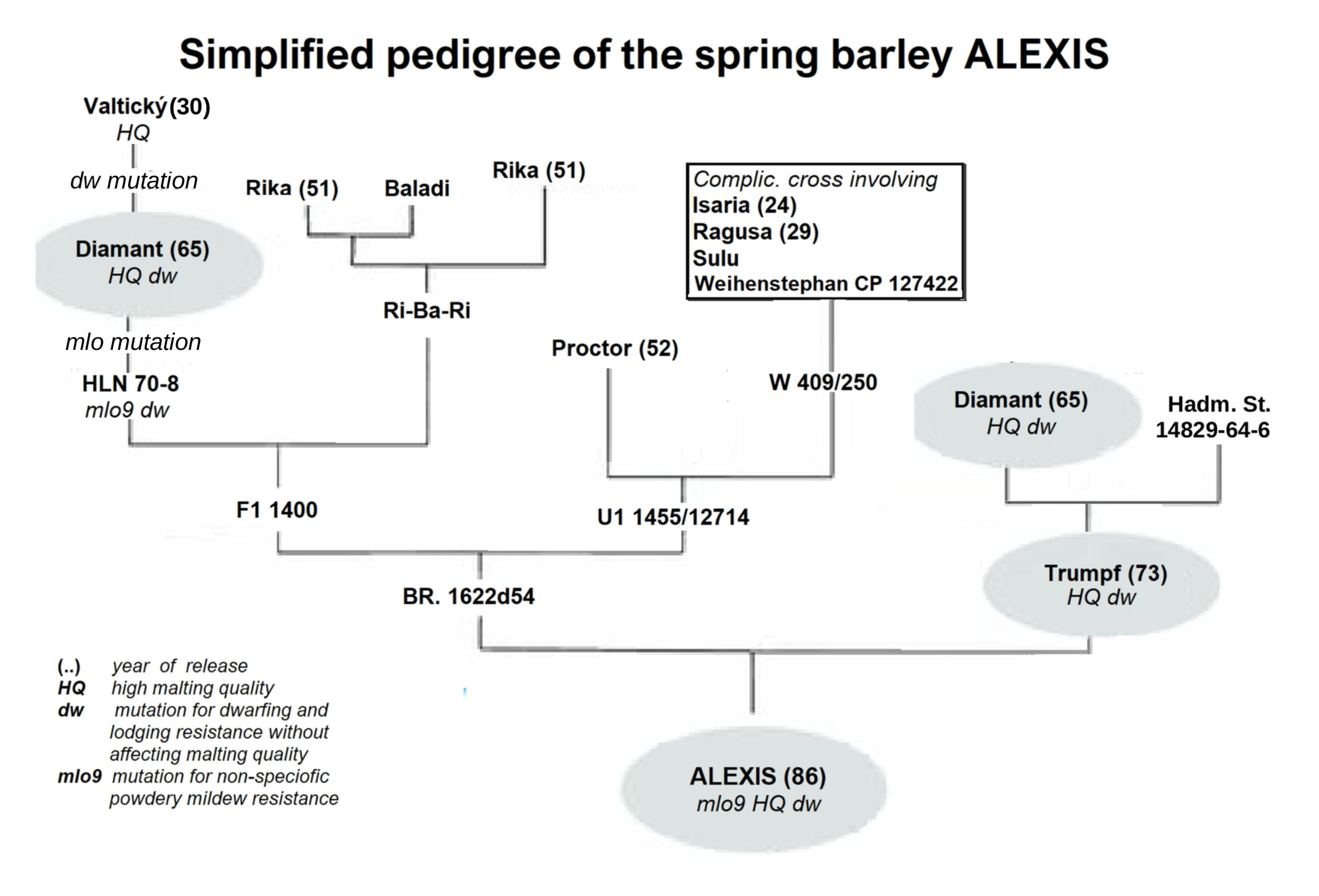

The variety originated from a cross of Br 1622d54 * Trumpf, done in 1975 by Josef Breun. It was introduced in Germany in 1986 and quickly became the dominant variety until 2006 in whole Europe. Due to its mildew resistance (Erysiphe graminis ssp. hordei) based on the mlo-9 mutation, induced in the variety Diamant, and the denso dwarfing gene combined with an excellent brewing quality Alexis has been a milestone in malting barley breeding. The pedigree:

Besides Germany, Alexis was listed in Spain, Denmark, Ireland, Hungary, Great Britain, France und Italy. Mainly in Germany Alexis has been the dominant malting barley for more than a decade. There it had been the main source for malt for most of the - small or big - breweries. Its peak was in 1992 when she had 9048 ha of multiplication area. Alexis has been so far the variety with the highest multiplication area in Germany over the last 30 years.

It has been supplanted by newer varieties with better agronomics, but it is in growing demand for premium products. It is one of the few barley malts marketed today by variety. Alexis is popular both in homebrewing circles and among traditional real ale breweries, many of whom note their exclusive use of Alexis in their promotional literature. It carries a price premium to most other varieties.

Due to its broad acceptance and its consistently good results Alexis is one of the varieties most often used in modern pedigrees. Alexis can be rightly considered as a "founder" of the current genetic in malting barley.
