= Aleksi Mäkelä (ice hockey, born 1993) =

Finnish ice hockey player

- Born: 3 May 1993 (age 33) Kiiminki, Finland
- Height: 180 cm (5 ft 11 in)
- Weight: 84 kg (185 lb; 13 st 3 lb)
- Position: Defenceman
- Shoots: Left
- PHL team Former teams: TH Unia Oświęcim; Oulun Kärpät; Vaasan Sport
- Playing career: 2014–present

Aleksi Mäkelä (born 3 May 1993) is a Finnish ice hockey defenceman currently playing for TH Unia Oświęcim of the Polska Hokej Liga.

== Career statistics ==
			Regular season					Playoffs
Season	Team	League	GP	G	A	Pts	PIM	GP	G	A	Pts	PIM
2011–12	Oulun Kärpät U20	U20 SM-liiga	20	1	0	1	4	3	0	0	0	0
2011–12	Ahmat Haukipudas	Suomi-sarja	1	0	0	0	0	—	—	—	—	—
2012–13	Oulun Kärpät U20	U20 SM-liiga	44	4	13	17	32	5	0	2	2	4
2013–14	Oulun Kärpät U20	U20 SM-liiga	37	3	17	20	28	12	0	2	2	4
2014–15	Hokki	Mestis	47	1	10	11	14	9	0	2	2	4
2015–16	Hokki	Mestis	34	3	7	10	32	16	3	1	4	8
2015–16	Oulun Kärpät	Liiga	18	0	3	3	0	—	—	—	—	—
2016–17	Oulun Kärpät	Liiga	55	2	4	6	20	2	0	0	0	0
2017–18	Oulun Kärpät	Liiga	39	3	3	6	2	2	1	0	1	0
2018–19	Oulun Kärpät	Liiga	50	4	6	10	10	5	0	0	0	0
2019–20	Oulun Kärpät	Liiga	27	0	6	6	4	—	—	—	—	—
2020–21	Vaasan Sport	Liiga	36	1	1	2	16	2	0	0	0	0
2021–22	Vaasan Sport	Liiga	28	1	1	2	16	—	—	—	—	—
2021–22	Peliitat Heinola	Mestis	3	0	1	1	0	—	—	—	—	—
2022–23	Ritten Sport	AlpsHL	35	3	11	14	16	10	0	2	2	7
2022–23	Ritten Sport	Italy	3	0	0	0	0	—	—	—	—	—
2023–24	Fife Flyers	EIHL	53	2	16	18	36	2	0	0	0	0
2024–25	JKH GKS Jastrzębie	PHL	39	5	26	31	18	14	0	2	2	4
2025–26	TH Unia Oświęcim	PHL	29	3	11	14	12	15	0	1	1	8
Liiga totals			253	11	24	35	68	11	1	0	1	0
