= Rafael Jordana =

Spanish scientist (born 1941)

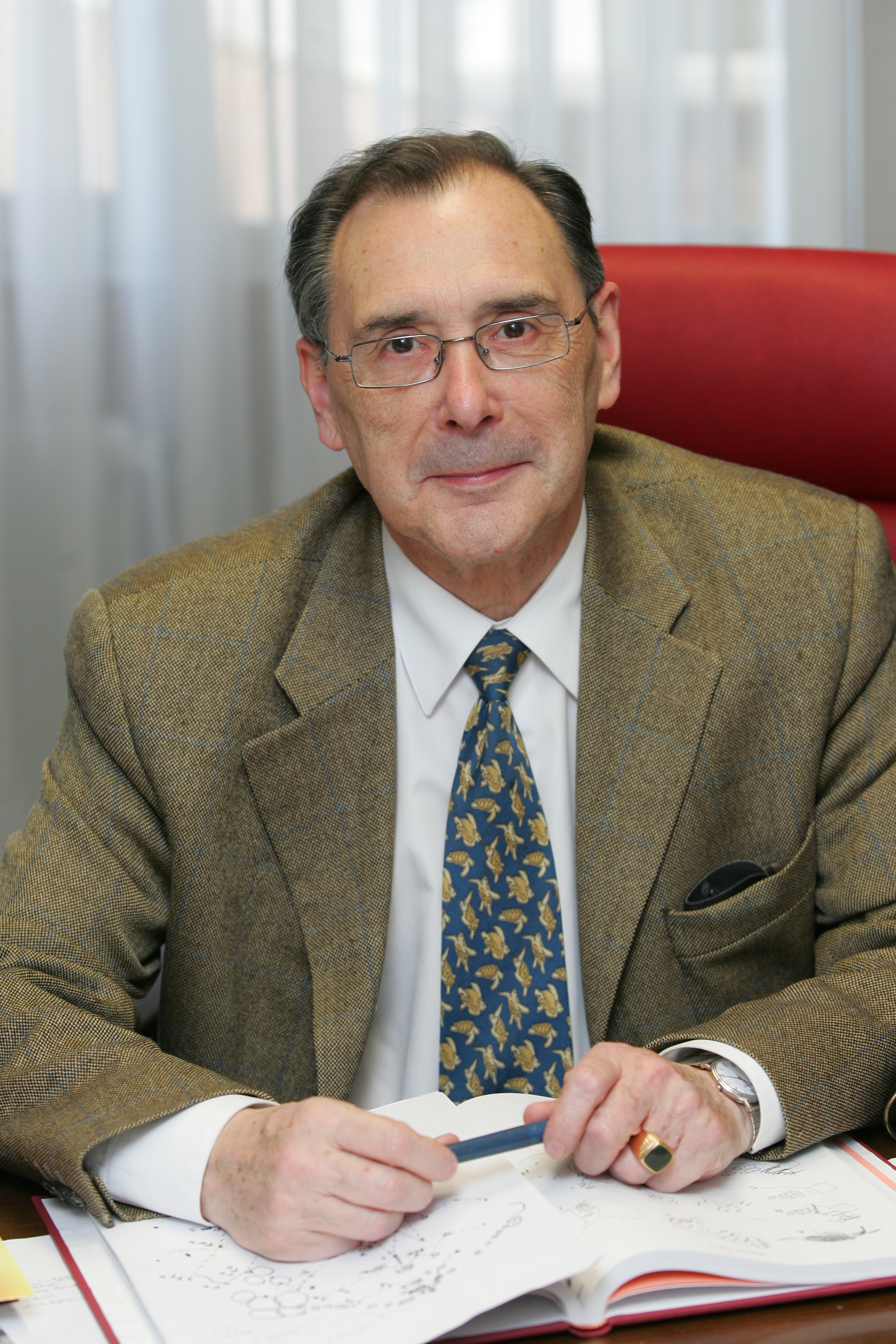
- Born: Rafael Jordana Butticaz; 17 July 1941; Zaragoza, Spain
- Education: University of Barcelona
- Scientific career
- Fields: Springtail

Rafael Jordana Butticaz (born Zaragoza, 17 July 1941) is a Spanish scientist, Emeritus Professor of Animal Physiology and Zoology, and specialist in springtails (Collembola) .

== Biography ==
=== Academic training and teaching work ===
Jordana earned a bachelor's degree in Natural Sciences (Biology) from the University of Barcelona in 1964, with honors.

His teaching career began at Tajamar School, where he taught biology from 1963 to 1964. In 1965 he moved to Barcelona to start his doctorate, and was associate professor at the University of Barcelona from 1965 to 1967. From there, he moved to Pamplona where he completed his doctoral thesis in Biological Sciences, the first to be defended at the Faculty of Sciences. At the same time he was an associate professor at the University of Navarra (1967-1971). In 1971, at the age of twenty-nine, he obtained two chairs simultaneously: "Animal Physiology" and "Applied Zoology", at the University of La Laguna in the Canary Islands, and was named Professor.

In October 1972, he moved back to Pamplona, where he worked as Professor of Zoology and Comparative Animal Physiology at the University of Navarra. He started to develop the Department of Zoology, and to archive the department's faunal research collections. These collections were later incorporated into the Zoology Museum of the University of Navarra, where he was the director from its foundation in 1980 until his retirement in 2011.

He held various positions in the Faculty of Sciences of the University of Navarra: Director of Studies (1969-1971), Faculty Secretary (1973-1975), Vice-Dean (1975-1981), Dean (1981-1990); Director of the Department of Zoology (1972-1993), and Director of the Department of Zoology and Ecology (1993-1999).

=== Research ===
From 1965 to 1980, Jordana researched the biochemistry of the enterocyte in response to irradiation and different drugs, comparing the active transport of sugars. He published thirty-five research on Biochemistry and Comparative Physiology during this period.

On his appointment as Zoology Department Director he began working on soil fauna, creating a research group in Soil Biology and directing theses on Nematoda, Collembola, Acari, Oligochaeta and insects. He also collaborated with other departments focusing on vertebrates.

In 2000, he obtained from the National Agency for Quality Assessment and Accreditation an evaluation of 6 six-year research terms, the maximum that could be achieved.

Jordana has written 255 papers, books and book chapters, with 2,000 citations, and discovered and described 120 species of taxa. He obtained four patents, and 31 research grants from different entities. He directed 27 doctoral theses, all of them with a qualification of Summa cum laude.

=== Professional memberships ===
- Member of the Council of Trustees for the Civil Studies Centers of the University of Navarra (1977-1984).
- Founding member of the Fundación Empresa-Universidad de Navarra (1987-2011).
- Director of the Institute of Applied Biology of the Scientific and Technological Institute (1991-2011).
- Director of the Biology Collection of Editorial Eunsa (1973-2000).
- Member of the Spanish Society of Physiological Sciences (until 1975).
- Member of the Royal Spanish Society of Natural History (until 2011).
- Member of the Spanish Association of Entomology (until 2011).
- Member of the European Society for Comparative Physiology and Biochemistry (until 1975).
- Member of the expert panel of the European Research Network on Forest Ecosystems (until 2009).
- Member of the Institute of Economic and Social Research Francisco de Vitoria (since 2016)
- Honorary Professor at the Ricardo Palma University (Peru)
