= Minna Arve =

Finnish politician (born 1974)

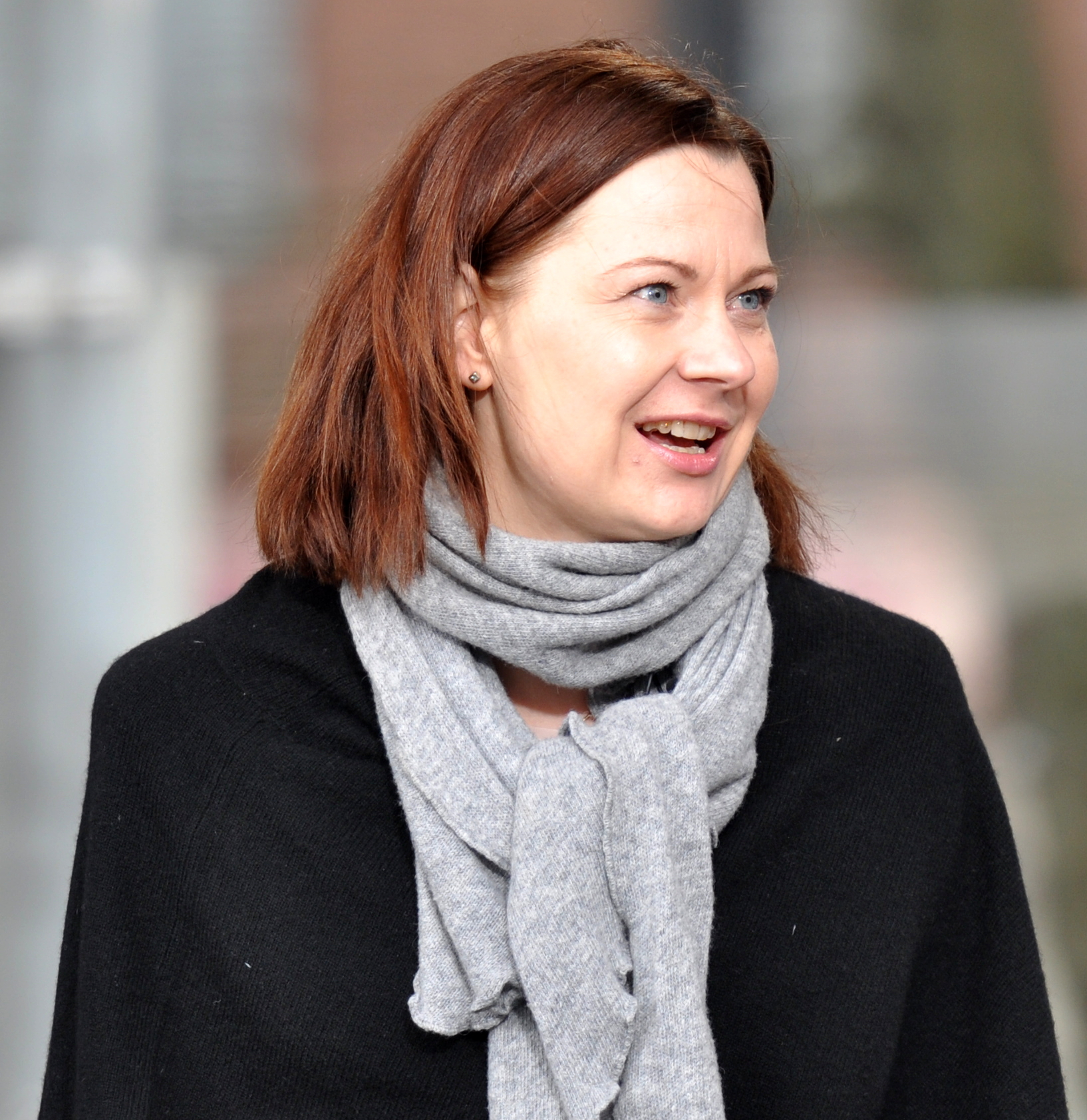
- Arve in 2015

Mayor of Turku
- Incumbent
- Assumed office 2017–2021(as town manager); 2021–(as mayor)
- Preceded by: Aleksi Randell (as town manager)

Personal details
- Born: 1974 (age 51–52) Turku, Finland
- Party: NCP

Minna Arve (born 1974) is a Finnish ex-politician who served as the mayor of Turku from August 2021 until June 2025. In August 2021 the post of the mayor became a local election based office instead of a hired position. She represented the National Coalition Party.

== Education ==
Arve first studied to become a nurse and graduated in 1996. She worked as a nurse before working for a medical company and writing her thesis economics at the Turku School of Economics and earned her master's degree in Marketing in 2004.

In addition to her mother tongue, Finnish, Arve also knows English, Swedish, French and German.

== Political career ==
Arve joined the NCP in 1994. Between 2010 and 2014 Arve was the chair of the city council of Turku. She worked as the party's general secretary from Oct 2014 to Jan 2016.

Arve was first elected into the city council of Turku in 2004. She has been reelected ever since. In 2017 the city council chose her as the town manager of Turku when her predecessor Aleksi Randell became the CEO of the Finnish construction industry's interest organisation. Next year Kuntalehti, a Finnish magazine on municipal politics, published a comparison of 40 municipal manager's salaries, which placed Arve on the top with gross monthly income of 15,311 euros. In the 2021 municipal election, where she ran as her party's mayoral candidate, Arve got 1510 votes, third most in her party after MPs Petteri Orpo and Ilkka Kanerva.

=== Political position ===
According to VAA published by Yle in 2021, Arve said that she is for needle exchange for the drug users in Turku, offering free protection to people under 25, and having a pride flag in public buildings.

As Arve became the general secretary of NCP (Oct2014 to Jan2016) she described the party as a big tent with values.

In March 2022, Arve courted controversy when upholding the banning of a Ukrainian flag being flown near the Russian consulate in Turku in protest against the Russian invasion of Ukraine.
