= Rautanen =

Rautanen (from Finnish rauta ("iron") + the surname-forming suffix -nen) is a Finnish family name. Notable people with the surname include:

- Joni Rautanen (born 1986), Finnish sprinter
- Juho Rautanen (born 1997), Finnish ice hockey player
- Martti Rautanen (1845–1926), Finnish Lutheran missionary
- Tuula Rautanen (born 1942), Finnish sprinter
