= Robert Arthur Alexie =

Canadian novelist (1957–2014)

- Born: July 22, 1957; Fort McPherson, Northwest Territories, Canada
- Died: June 9, 2014 (aged 56)
- Citizenship: Canadian
- Education: Samuel Hearne Secondary School; Thebacha College
- Occupations: Novelist, land claim negotiator
- Writing career
- Notable works: Porcupines and China Dolls; The Pale Indian
- Notable awards: Queen Elizabeth II Golden Jubilee Medal (2002)

Robert Arthur Alexie (22 July 1957 – 9 June 2014) was a Canadian First Nations novelist and a land claim negotiator who played a key role in land claim agreements in the Northwest Territories.

Alexie was born in Fort McPherson, Northwest Territories and lived in Inuvik. He served as Tribal chief of the Tetlit Gwich'in of Fort McPherson and also served as the vice president of the Gwich'in Tribal Council for two terms, helping achieve a land claims agreement. He was elected as President of the Gwich'in Tribal Council in July 2012.

== Education ==
Alexie attended Chief Julius School (né Peter Warren Dease School) in Fort McPherson but completed his high school education in 1974 at Samuel Hearne Secondary School in Inuvik.

In 1984, Alexie completed a two-year public business and administration program at Thebacha College in Fort Smith.

== Political involvement and advocacy ==
Alexie served as band manager of the Tetlit Gwich'in Band Council and was elected Tribal chief of the Tetlit Gwich'in of Fort McPherson in 1989 and served two year. He also served as the vice president of the Gwich'in Tribal Council for two terms and was elected as President of the Gwich'in Tribal Council in July 2012.

== Land claim negotiations ==
In 1990, Alexie led the Gwich'in delegation at a Territories-wide meeting of Dene and Metís groups working on a comprehensive land claim agreement between these groups and the government of Canada. When it became clear that other groups at the delegation were not ready to accept the negotiating position taken by the Gwich'in, Alexie led a walkout of the Gwich'in delegation. Alexie then became the Chief Negotiator for the Gwich'in Tribal Council as they pursued their own land claim agreement with the Government of Canada, which led to the signing in April 1992 of the Gwich'in Comprehensive Land Claim Agreement.

Signed in April 1992, the Gwich'in Comprehensive Land Claim Agreement provided the Gwich'in with the following rights:

- Ownership of approximately 22,330 square kilometres of land in the Northwest Territories, and 1,554 square kilometres in the Yukon.
- Subsurface (mineral) rights to 6,158 square kilometres of land in the Northwest Territories.
- A tax-free payment of $75 million paid over a 15-year period, a share of resource revenues from development in the Northwest Territories, and a 15-year subsidy of property taxes on certain Gwich'in municipal lands.
- Participation in land use planning and management of renewable resources, land, water, and Gwich'in heritage resources.
- Exclusive rights to be licensed to conduct commercial wildlife activities on Gwich'in lands and preferential rights in the whole settlement area.
- Negotiation of self-government.

== Awards ==
In 2002, Alexie was awarded the Queen Elizabeth II's Golden Jubilee Medal for exemplary contribution to his community and to Canada.

== Novels ==
=== Porcupines and China Dolls ===
His first novel, Porcupines and China Dolls (published in 2002 and reissued by Theytus Books in paperback in 2009) examines the lives of students forced into the Canadian Indian residential school system and the ensuing intergenerational or historical trauma for them and their families.

As reviewer Jim Bartley wrote in The Globe and Mail, "On a September day in 1962, we enter the school (now "hostel") with two boys, James and Jake. For the first time in their lives, they will live without family around them, captive to strange, cold adults, a militarized sense of time and no appeal for the wrongs done them." Bartley adds, "[Alexie's] evocation of chronic mental anguish has a cumulative power that transcends his sentimental excess. Though the abuser is brought to justice here, the pain lives on in ever more elusive ways. Alexie offers no easy outs.

Thomas King explains the novel's title in The Truth About Stories: A Native Narrative: "the girls had been scrubbed and powdered to look like china dolls and the boys had been scrubbed and sheared to look like porcupines" One of the lines from which the title draws its name comes from Alexie writing, "No one heard the little china doll that night, but if she were given a voice, it would've sounded like a million porcupines screaming in the dark."

Author of The Lesser Blessed, Richard Van Camp's review of Porcupines and China Dolls suggests, "[t]his book will initiate more healing than any of us will ever know. It's hard but good medicine."

King also indicates that Alexie—alongside Eden Robinson, Harry Robinson and Ruby Slipperjack— creates "fictions... primarily for a Native audience, making a conscious decision not so much to ignore non-Native readers as to write for the very people they write about", suggesting that the text does not provide enough of a debriefing for a non-Native audience to understand its weight historically.

CBC Radio host Shelagh Rogers wrote, "Dramatic, raw, merciless, Porcupines and China Dolls is not a book you coast through. It is about our history and what happened to 'The People', as Alexie writes, when the Europeans arrived."

=== The Pale Indian ===
Alexie's sophomore novel, The Pale Indian (published in 2005), offers perhaps an even less clear historical debriefing than its predecessor, confirming King's suspicions about intended audience. The Pale Indian takes place in the 1980s and surround's a young man's return to his northern community after being raised in Calgary by an adoptive white family. The novel is both a love story and a tragedy. The Pale Indian is full of energetic sex and humour that provide respite from some of the more serious issues that the novel confronts.

== Bibliography ==
- Porcupines and China Dolls (2002), ISBN 978-1-894778-72-5
- The Pale Indian (2005), ISBN 978-0-14-301553-6
