= Aleksi Holmberg =

Finnish ice hockey player

- Born: March 17, 1987 (age 39) Helsinki, Finland
- Height: 6 ft 2 in (188 cm)
- Weight: 190 lb (86 kg; 13 st 8 lb)
- Position: Defence
- Shoots: Left
- Played for: SM-liiga; HIFK Helsinki; HPK Hameenlinna; Ligue Magnus; Diables Rouges de Briançon
- Playing career: 2006–present

Aleksi Holmberg (born March 17, 1987) is a Finnish professional ice hockey defenceman and kickboxer.

Holmberg has played for HIFK and HPK in Liiga, the top professional ice hockey league in Finland. He was also the captain of HIFK U20 in the Jr. A SM-liiga.

== Kickboxing record (incomplete) ==
Kickboxing Record
25 Wins (10 (T)KO's), 13 Losses
| Date | Result | Opponent | Event | Location | Method | Round | Time |
| 2020-02-27 | Loss | (Finland) Ali Tamouri | KOK 83 In Helsinki | Helsinki, Finland | Decision | 3 | 3:00 |
| 2019-09-28 | Win | (Finland) Marko Ranto | Nordic Open 2019 - Tournament Final | Copenhagen, Denmark | TKO | 2 | |
| 2019-09-28 | Win | (Denmark) Mads Juul Andressen | Nordic Open 2019 - Tournament Semifinal | Copenhagen, Denmark | Decision (Majority) | 3 | 3:00 |
| 2019-03-17 | Loss | (Finland) Tommi Savolainen | KBSM 2019 | Iisalmi, Finland | Decision (Split) | 3 | 3:00 |
Legend: Win Loss Draw/No contest Notes
