= Aleksi Honka-Hallila =

Finnish footballer (born 2001)

Personal information
- Date of birth: 15 January 2001 (age 25)
- Place of birth: Helsinki, Finland
- Height: 1.90 m (6 ft 3 in)
- Position: Goalkeeper

Team information
- Current team: Alta
- Number: 29

Youth career
- –2016: Jippo
- 2017–2018: KuPS

Senior career*
Years	Team	Apps	(Gls)
2018–2021	KuPS	0	(0)
2018–2020	→ KuFu-98 (loan)	25	(0)
2021	→ Jippo (loan)	0	(0)
2022–2024	MP	64	(0)
2025–	Alta IF	24	(0)

International career
2018	Finland U18	1	(0)
- * Club domestic league appearances and goals as of 3 November 2025

Aleksi Honka-Hallila (born 15 January 2001) is a Finnish professional footballer who plays as a goalkeeper for Norwegian club Alta IF.

== Club career ==
In January 2022, Honka-Hallila left KuPS for Mikkelin Palloilijat (MP). He was named the captain of MP for the 2024 season.

In February 2025, Honka-Hallila moved to Norway and signed for Alta IF in 2. divisjon.

== Career statistics ==
As of 22 May 2025

Appearances and goals by club, season and competition
Club	Season	League			National cup (Note: Includes Suomen Cup and Norwegian Cup)		League cup (Note: Includes Ykköscup and Ykkösliigacup)		Total	
Club	Season	Division	Apps	Goals	Apps	Goals	Apps	Goals	Apps	Goals
KuPS	2018	Veikkausliiga	0	0	0	0	–		0	0
KuPS	2019	Veikkausliiga	0	0	0	0	–		0	0
KuPS	2020	Veikkausliiga	0	0	0	0	–		0	0
KuFu-98 (loan)	2018	Kakkonen	7	0	–		–		7	0
KuFu-98 (loan)	2019	Kakkonen	12	0	–		–		12	0
KuFu-98 (loan)	2020	Kakkonen	6	0	–		–		6	0
KuFu-98 (loan)	Total		25	0	0	0	0	0	25	0
Jippo (loan)	2021	Ykkönen	0	0	2	0	–		2	0
MP	2022	Ykkönen	11	0	1	0	1	0	13	0
MP	2023	Ykkönen	26	0	0	0	3	0	29	0
MP	2024	Ykkösliiga	27	0	2	0	4	0	33	0
MP	Total		64	0	3	0	8	0	75	0
Savilahden Urheilijat (loan)	2022	Kolmonen	1	0	–		–		1	0
Alta IF	2025	2. divisjon	6	0	3	0	–		9	0
Career total			96	0	8	0	8	0	112	0
