= Alexis Lake =

Lake in the state of Minnesota, United States

- Location within Minnesota Location within the United States
- Location: Chisago County, Minnesota
- Coordinates: 45°37′45″N 93°6′55″W
- Type: lake
- Surface elevation: 932 feet (284 m)

Alexis Lake is a lake in Chisago County, Minnesota, in the United States. The lake is located roughly 50 miles north of Minneapolis. The lake is to the west of Minneapolis County Route 4, and to the north of 46th Street West. The lake has a smaller pond attached to it by a creek that goes through a small marshy area.

Alexis Lake was named for John P. Alexis, an early settler.

== See also ==
- List of lakes in Minnesota
