= Alexis =

Alexis may refer to:

== People ==
=== Mononym ===
- Alexis (poet) (c. 375 BC – c. 275 BC), a Greek comic poet
- Alexis (sculptor), an ancient Greek artist who lived around the 3rd or 4th century BC
- Alexis (singer) (born 1968), German pop singer
- Alexis (comics) (1946–1977), French comics artist
- Alexis, character in Virgil's second Eclogue, beloved of Corydon
- Alexis, in Greek mythology, a young man of Ephesus, beloved of Meliboea
- Alexis, a character from Transformers: Unicron Trilogy
- Alexis, half of the Puerto Rican reggaeton duo Alexis & Fido, also known as Los Pitbulls

=== Given name ===
- Alexis (given name)

=== Surname ===
- Aaron Alexis (1979–2013), perpetrator of the 2013 Washington Navy Yard shooting
- Alexander Chamberlain Alexis (1921–2014), Trinidad and Tobago politician
- Kim Alexis (born 1960), American supermodel
- Jacques-Édouard Alexis (born 1947), former prime minister of Haiti
- Jacques Stephen Alexis (1922–1961), Haitian communist novelist, poet, and activist
- Nicola Alexis, British actress
- Paul Alexis (1847–1901), French novelist, dramatist, and journalist
- Stephen Alexis (1889–1962), Haitian novelist and diplomat
- Wendell Alexis (born 1964), American basketball player
- Willibald Alexis or Georg Wilhelm Heinrich Häring (1798–1871), German novelist

== Places ==
- Alexis, Alabama, U.S., an unincorporated community
- Alexis, Illinois, U.S., a village
- Alexis Lake, a lake in Minnesota, U.S.
- Alexis Township, Butler County, Nebraska, U.S.

== Other uses ==
- Alexis Cars, a British racing car constructor
- ALEXIS, the Array of Low Energy X-ray Imaging Sensors spacecraft
- Alexis (malting barley), a malting barley variety

== See also ==
- Alexia (disambiguation)
- Alexius, a given name
- Aleksejs, a given name
- Alexisonfire, a Canadian band
- Alexus, a given name and surname
- Saint-Alexis (disambiguation)
