= Aleksi Orenius =

Finnish ice hockey player

- Born: October 24, 1993 (age 31); Tampere, Finland
- Height: 5 ft 9 in (175 cm)
- Weight: 159 lb (72 kg; 11 st 5 lb)
- Position: Defence
- Shoots: Left
- team Former teams: Free agent Ilves
- NHL draft: Undrafted
- Playing career: 2013–present

Aleksi Orenius (born October 24, 1993) is a Finnish ice hockey defenceman.

Orenius made his SM-liiga debut playing with Ilves during the 2012–13 SM-liiga season.
