= Aleksi Rutanen =

Finnish ice hockey player

- Born: July 19, 1994 (age 30); Espoo, Finland
- Height: 6 ft 1 in (185 cm)
- Weight: 176 lb (80 kg; 12 st 8 lb)
- Position: Right wing
- Shoots: Left
- Liiga team: Espoo Blues
- Playing career: 2013–present

Aleksi Rutanen (born July 19, 1994) is a Finnish professional ice hockey Right wing. He is currently playing with Espoo Blues in the Finnish Liiga.

Rutanen made his SM-liiga debut playing with Espoo Blues during the 2012–13 SM-liiga season.
