= Aleksi Randell =

Finnish politician

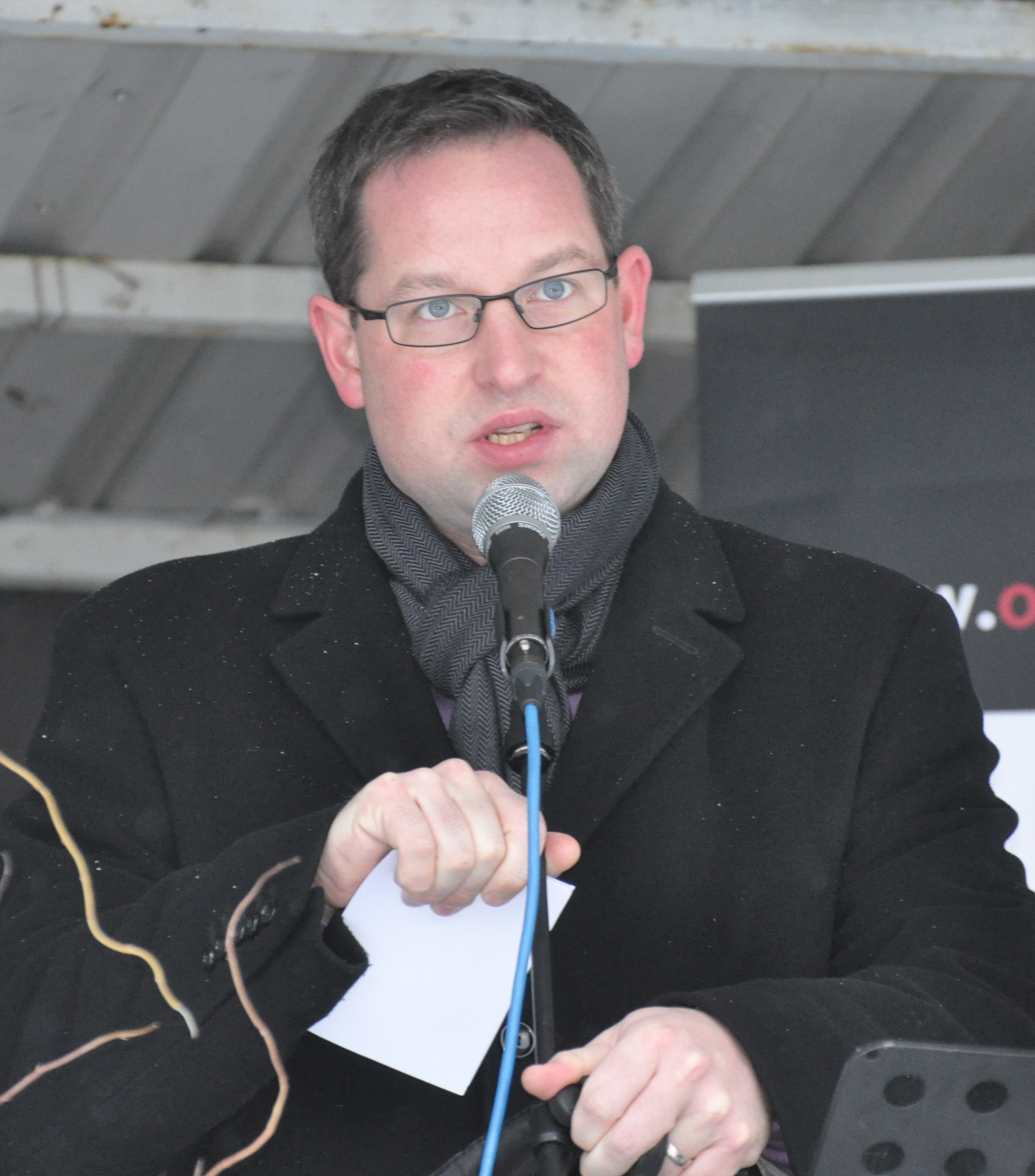
Aleksi Randell

Aleksi Randell (born 22 July 1975 in Turku) is a Finnish politician. He has served as the mayor of Turku since 2010. From 2003 to 2010 he served as the chairman of the municipal board in Turku. He represents the National Coalition Party (Kokoomus), and is the vice chairman of the party's council.

He was married to Johanna Lukola-Randell.
