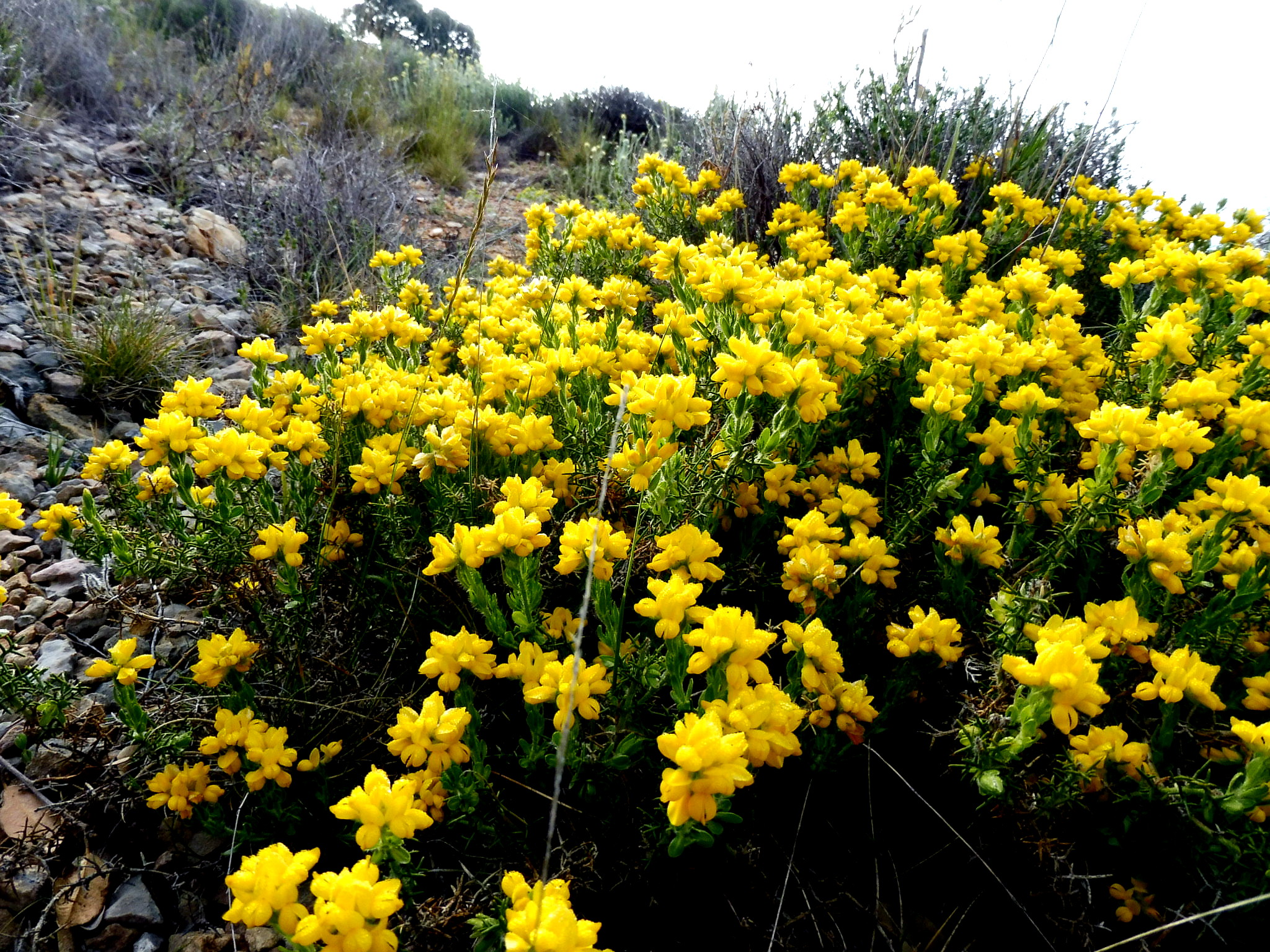
- In the wild in Spain
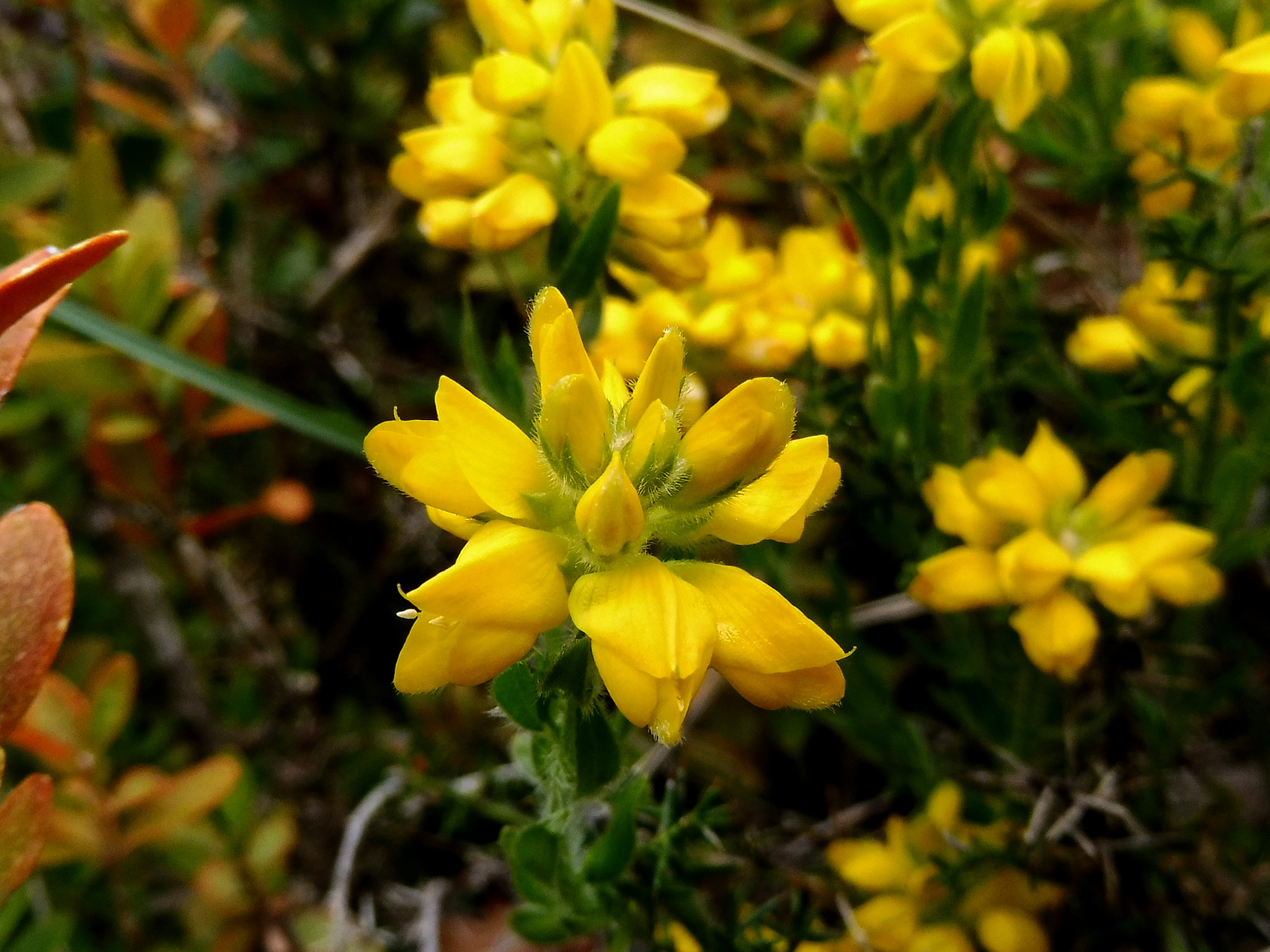
- Close up of flowers

Conservation status
- Least Concern (IUCN 3.1)

Scientific classification
- Kingdom: Plantae
- Clade: Tracheophytes
- Clade: Angiosperms
- Clade: Eudicots
- Clade: Rosids
- Order: Fabales
- Family: Fabaceae
- Subfamily: Faboideae
- Genus: Genista
- Species: G. hispanica

Binomial name
- Genista hispanica L.

Synonyms
- Lissera hispanica (L.) Fourr.; Spartium hispanicum (L.) Spreng.; Telinaria hispanica (L.) C.Presl; Voglera hispanica (L.) Fourr.

= Genista hispanica =

Species of flowering plant

Genista hispanica, the Spanish gorse, or anlaga, is a species of flowering plant in the family Fabaceae, native to southern France and northern Spain. It is a dense, low, cushion-like deciduous shrub growing to 0.7 metres high, with very spiny shoots. The flowers are bright yellow, in terminal clusters on the outside surface of the shrub; the flowers are typical peaflower structure, with 8–11 mm standard and wing petals.

== Subspecies ==
The following subspecies are accepted:

- Genista hispanica subsp. hispanica — in the east of the species range in northeastern Spain, southern France
- Genista hispanica subsp. occidentalis Rouy — in the west of the species range in southwestern France (western Pyrenees), northern Spain

== Cultivation ==
Introduced to Britain as a garden plant in 1759, it has become widely naturalised in England and Wales, and locally in Scotland, typically on sandy or stony soils. It is suited for borders, wall and rock gardens, gravelly soils, and coastal situations.
