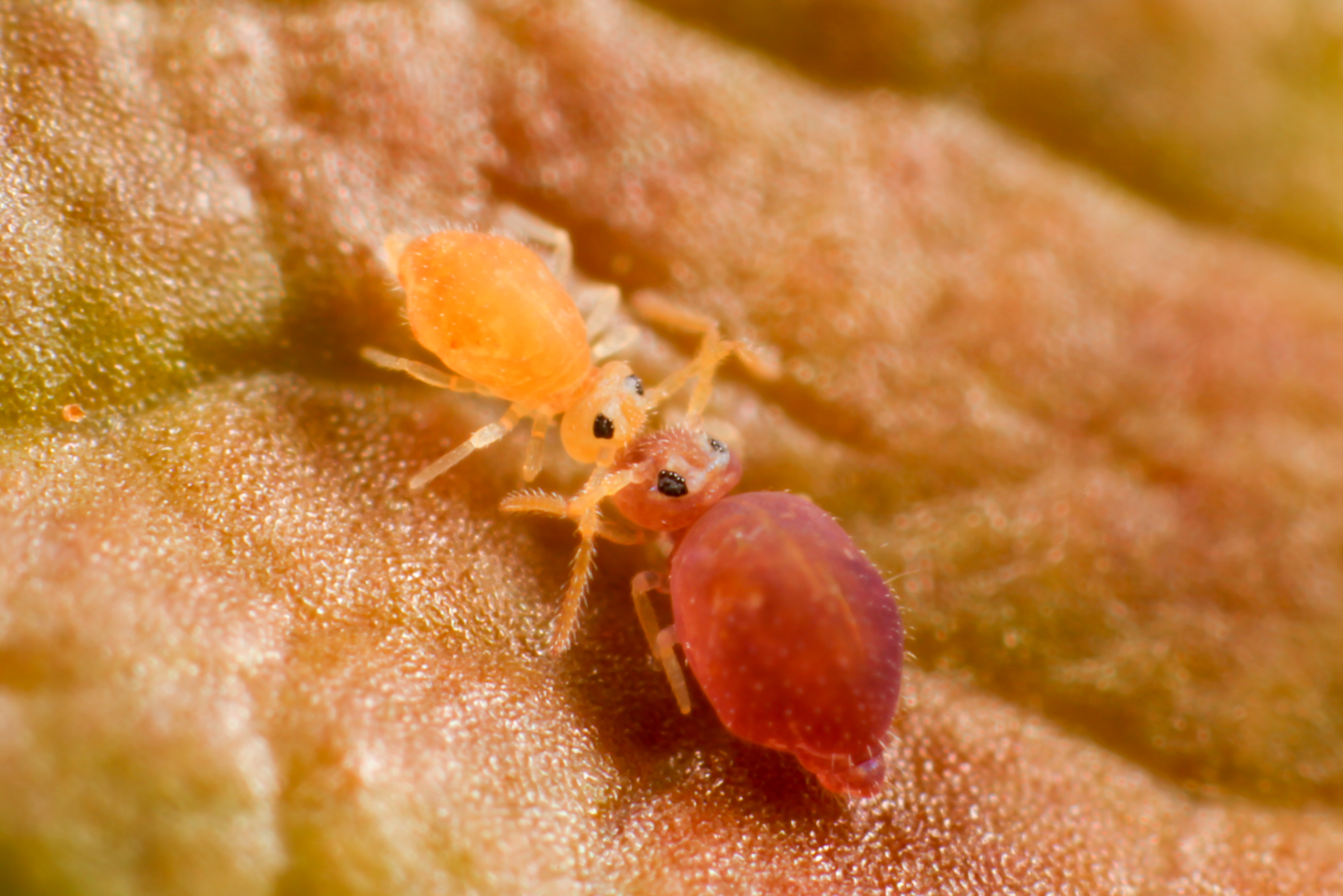
- Courtship of Deuterosminthurus pallipes

Scientific classification
- Kingdom: Animalia
- Phylum: Arthropoda
- Clade: Pancrustacea
- Class: Collembola
- Order: Symphypleona
- Superfamily: Sminthuroidea
- Family: Bourletiellidae; Börner, 1913

= Bourletiellidae =

Family of springtails

Bourletiellidae is a family of primarily herbivorous Springtails within the order Symphypleona. They are known from several parts of the globe, and are known to engage in complex mating rituals.

== Distribution ==
Species have been recorded in areas such as Brazil, Australia, and the Holarctic realm. They live in forests and open areas such as grasslands, and on alive or dead vegetation.

== Reproduction and Development ==
Male individuals of this family will search for females upon leaves, where they will then engage in a complex mating dance. The mating dance begins with a male attaching to a female with a special appendage formed from a modified antennae, the females will then carry the smaller males. This dance culminates with the female individual accepting a spermatophore from the male. In some cases, instead of accepting the spermatophore for reproductive purposes, the female will consume it.

During early development, Bourletiellidae undergo postzygotic sex determination where two sex chromosomes are deleted for the development of males. This form of sex determination leads to lopsided sex ratios where colonies will have more females than males.

== Etymology ==
The family was named by Börner (1913), With the name being in reference to the springtail researcher Abbé C. Bourlet

== Taxonomy ==
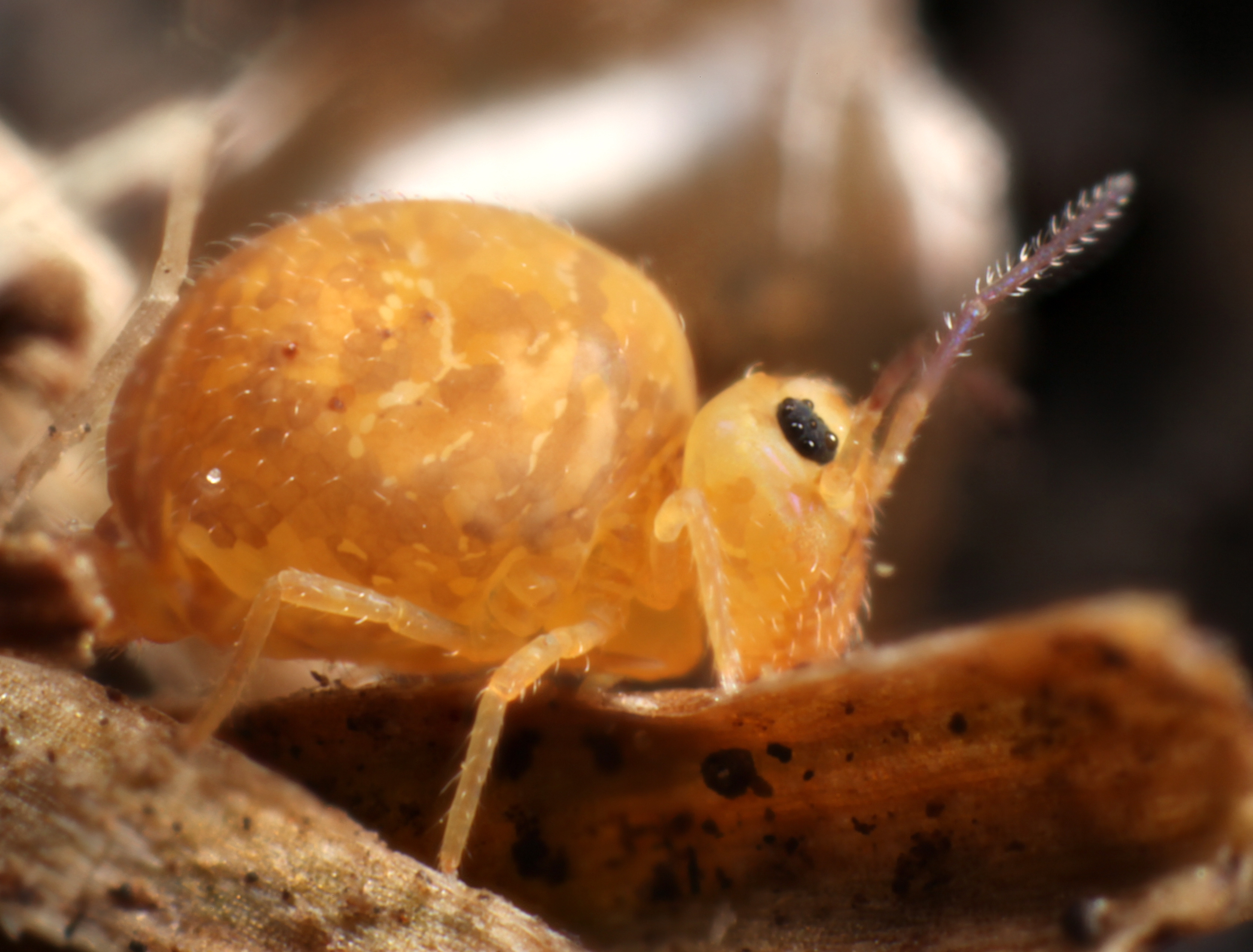
Bourletiella hortensis

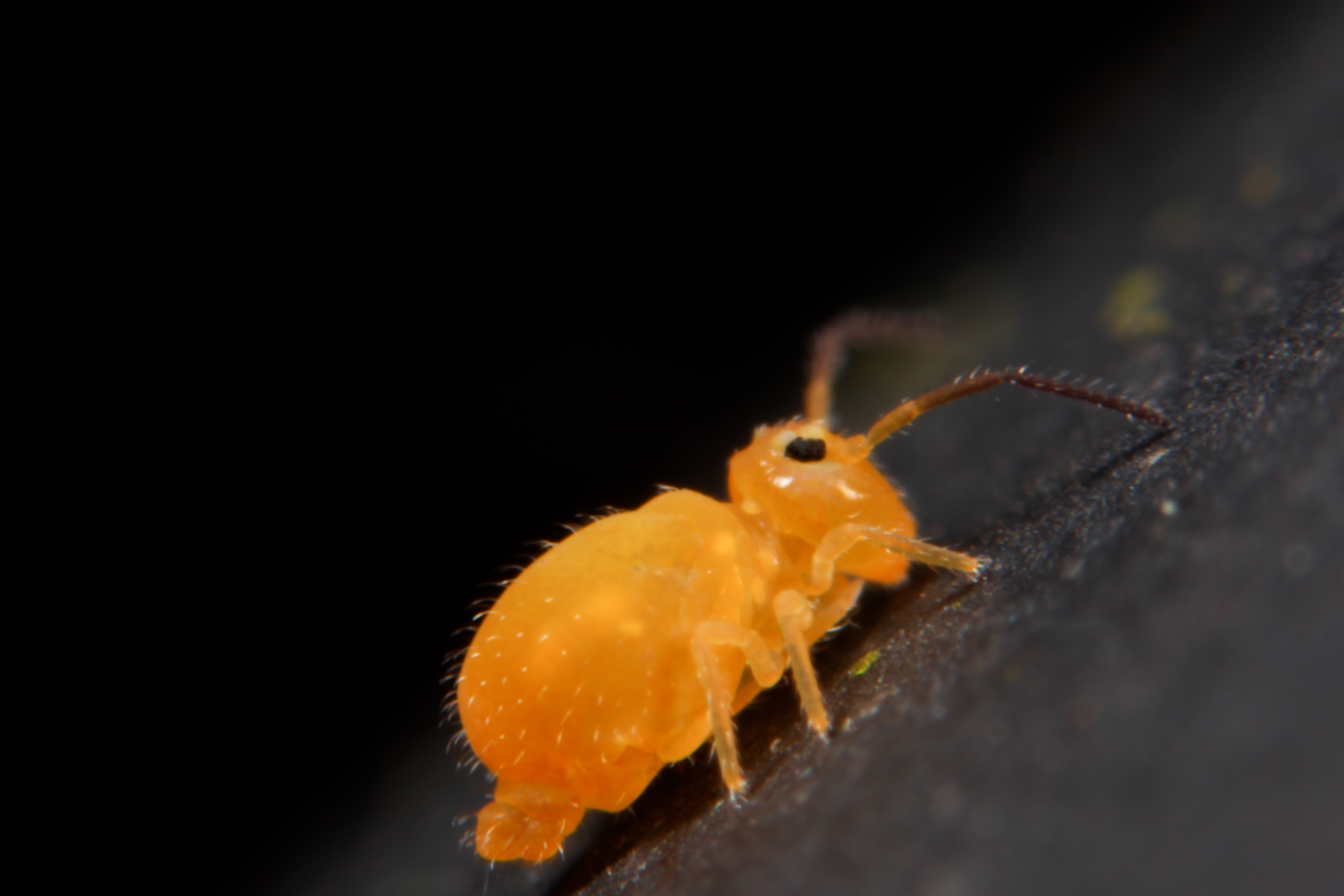
Heterosminthurus insignis

Bourletiellidae contains the following genera:

=== Subfamily Bourletiellinae ===
- Achetidae
- Acutoempodialis
- Adisianus
- Anarmatus
- Andiella
- Aneuempodialis
- Arlesminthurus
- Bourletides
- Bovicornia
- Burletiella
- Cassagnaudiella
- Corynephoria
- Cyprania
- Deuterosminthurus
- Diksamella
- Ellisiella
- Fasciosminthurus
- Heterosminthurus
- Karakumiella
- Kaszabellina
- Koupelia
- Madecassiella
- Massoudia
- Nasosminthurus
- Navarrella
- Orenius
- Paulianitas
- Prorastriopes
- Pseudobourletiella
- Rastriopes
- Sanaaiella
- Smynthurella
- Stenognathriopes
- Tritosminthurus

=== Subfamily Parabourletiellinae ===
- Anjavidiella
- Bourletiellitas
- Parabourletiella
- Vatomadiella

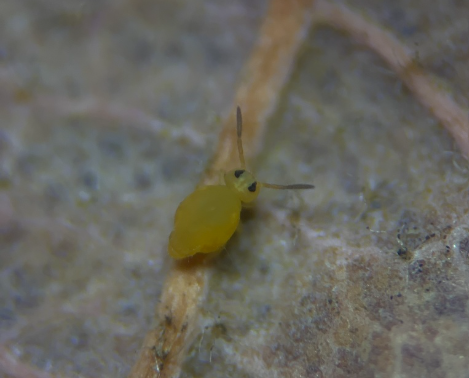
Bourletiellidae sp.
