= Eijkman (disambiguation) =

Christiaan Eijkman (1858–1930) was a Dutch physician, professor of physiology and Nobel laureate.

- Johan Fredrik Eijkman (1851–1915), a chemist

Eijkman may also refer to several places named in his honor:

- Eijkman (crater), a crater on the Moon
- 9676 Eijkman, an asteroid
- Eijkman Point, a place in Antarctica
- Eijkman test.
