= Odon =

Odon may refer to:

== People ==
- Odo of Gascony (French: Odon) (c. 1010–1039/1040), Duke of Gascony, Duke of Aquitaine and Count of Poitou
- Odon de Bénac, Bishop of Oloron in France from 1083 to 1101
- Odon de Châtillon (died c. 1102), French cardinal
- Odon of Poznań (1149–1194), Duke of Greater Poland and of Kalisz
- Odon or Eudes de Sully (died 1208), Bishop of Paris
- Odon de Pins (1212–1296), Grand Master of the Knights Hospitaller
- Odón Alonso (1925–2011), Spanish conductor and composer
- Odon Bacqué, American politician and non-fiction writer
- Odón Betanzos Palacios (1925–2007), Spanish poet, novelist, literary critic and professor
- Odón de Buen y del Cos (1863–1945), Spanish naturalist, politician and publicist
- Odo Bujwid (1857–1942), Polish bacteriologist sometimes referred to as Odon Budwid
- Odón Elorza (born 1955), Basque politician
- Odon Godart (1913–1996), Belgian astronomer and meteorologist
- Odon Guitar (1825–1908), Union Missouri State Militia brigadier general during the American Civil War
- Odon Jadot (1884–1968) was a Belgian railway engineer and administrator who built more than 1,650 kilometres of railroad in the Belgian Congo
- Odon Razanakolona (born 1946), Archbishop of Antananarivo, Madagascar
- Ödön, a masculine given name of Hungarian origin, including a list of people so named

== Places ==
- Odon (Lydia), a town of ancient Lydia, now in Turkey
- Odon (river), France
- Odón, Aragon, Spain, a municipality
- Odon, Indiana, United States, a town

== Other uses ==
- Separate Operational Purpose Division (ODON), a Russian rapid deployment, internal security division
- Operation Epsom (or the First Battle of the Odon) and the Second Battle of the Odon, both of which took place on the Odon River
- Odón Device, invented by Jorge Odón, which is used to assist in difficult child birth
- "-odon", a suffix used in taxonomy

== See also ==
- Odo (disambiguation)
