= Ödön =

Ödön is a male given name of Hungarian origin, since the 19th century Ödön became variant of Edmund. It may refer to:

- Ödön Bárdi (1877–1958), actor
- Ödön Batthyány-Strattmann (1826–1914) nobleman
- Ödön Beöthy (1796–1854), politician
- Ödön Bodor (1882–1927), athlete
- Ödön Földessy (1929–2020), long jumper
- Ödön von Horváth (1901–1938), writer
- Ödön Lechner (1845–1914), architect
- Ödön Mihalovich (1842–1929), composer and music educator
- Ödön Pártos (1907–1977), musician and composer
- Ödön Singer (1831–1912), violinist

== See also ==
- Odon (disambiguation)
