= Dawson (crater) =

Lunar impact crater

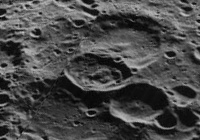
- Oblique Lunar Orbiter 5 image facing west, with Dawson (center), Dawson V (above right of center), and Dawson D (below right of center)
- Coordinates: 67.4°S 134.7°W
- Diameter: 44.32 km (27.54 mi)
- Depth: Unknown
- Colongitude: 137° at sunrise
- Formation: Lower Imbrian
- Eponym: Bernhard H. Dawson

Dawson is a lunar impact crater that lies on the southern hemisphere on the far side of the Moon. It lies across a crater triplet: the southeast rim is intruding into the crater Alekhin; the northwest rim also intrudes into the larger satellite crater Dawson V, and the northeast rim is attached to the comparably sized Dawson D. To the south of this formation is the large crater Zeeman. West of Dawson is the crater Crommelin, and to the north lies Fizeau.

On the lunar geologic timescale, this formation dates to the Lower Imbrian period. Dawson is a younger feature amidst a field of ancient, heavily eroded craters. The outer rim is nearly circular, but slightly distorted due to the craters it overlaps. The western rim is slightly flattened where it overlaps Dawson V. This crater formation shows only a modest appearance of wear, with a small craterlet across the northwest rim and another inside the northeast rim. The interior is irregular with slumped material and some slight terraces along parts of the inner wall.

This crater is named after Argentine astronomer Bernhard H. Dawson (1890–1960). Its designation was officially adopted by the International Astronomical Union in 1970.

== Satellite craters ==
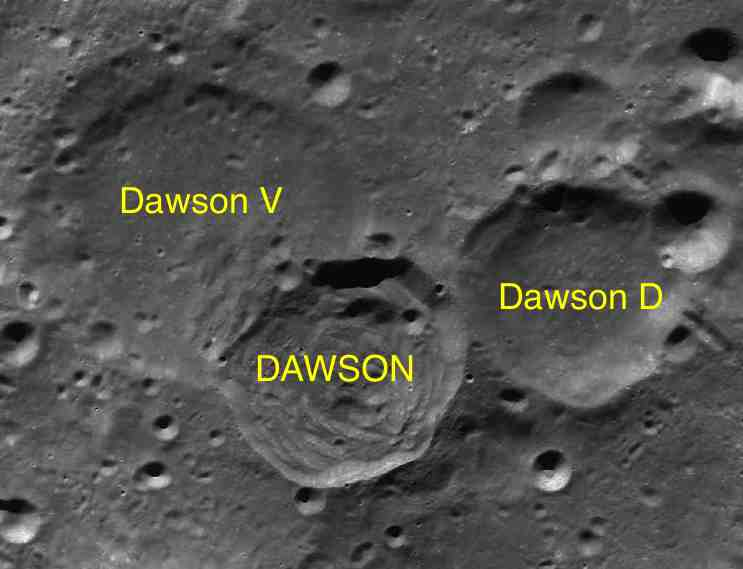
Satellite features of Dawson

By convention these features are identified on lunar maps by placing the letter on the side of the crater midpoint that is closest to Dawson.

Dawson	Latitude	Longitude	Diameter
D	66.6° S	131.7° W	39 km
V	66.6° S	137.0° W	58 km
