= Alekhin =

Alekhin may refer to:

- Andrey Alekhin (born 1959), Russian politician
- Nikolai Alekhin (1913–1964), a Soviet Union rocket designer
- Alekhin (crater), a lunar crater
- 1909 Alekhin, an asteroid

== See also ==
- Alexander Alekhine, a Russian-French World Chess Champion
- Alekhine (disambiguation)
- Alyokhin (surname)
