= Alyokhin =

Alyokhin (Russian: Алёхин also transliterated as Alekhin or Alekhine or Aljechin) is a Russian-language surname derived from the given name "Alyokha", a diminutive for "Aleksey". Feminine form: Alyokhina/Alekhina (Russian: Алёхина.)

- Maria Alyokhina, Russian political activist
- Andrey Alekhin (born 1959), Russian politician
- Nikolai Alekhin (1913–1964), Soviet Union rocket designer
- Alexander Alekhine, Russian-French chess player

== See also ==
- Alekhine (disambiguation)
- Alekhin (disambiguation)
