= Alekhin (crater) =

Lunar crater

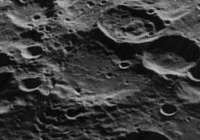
- Oblique Lunar Orbiter 5 image, facing west
- Coordinates: 68.2°S 131.3°W
- Diameter: 74.82 km
- Depth: Unknown
- Colongitude: 133° at sunrise
- Formation: Early Imbrian
- Eponym: Nikolai Alekhin

Alekhin is a lunar impact crater that is located on the southern hemisphere on the far side of the Moon. It lies to the north of the crater Zeeman, and south-southeast of Fizeau. To the west lies Crommelin, and east-southeast is Doerfel.

This formation dates to the Early Imbrian period of the lunar geologic timescale. The rim of Alekhin has been heavily eroded by subsequent impacts to the point where the edge is little more than a curving rise in the surface. The outer wall is completely overlain by the crater pair formed by crater Dawson across the northwest rim, and Dawson D on the northern rim. The southern rim is somewhat more heavily marked by gouges and irregularities in the surface, compared to the northeast rim. On the floor are a number of tiny craterlets.

This crater is named after Soviet rocket designer Nikolai Alekhin (1913-1964). Its designation was formally adopted by the International Astronomical Union in 1970.

== Satellite craters ==
By convention these features are identified on lunar maps by placing the letter on the side of the crater midpoint that is closest to Alekhin.

Alekhin	Latitude	Longitude	Diameter
E	67.2° S	124.1° W	38 km
