= Georges Lemaître =

Belgian scientist and Catholic priest (1894–1966)

The Reverend Monsignor Georges Lemaître RAS Associate
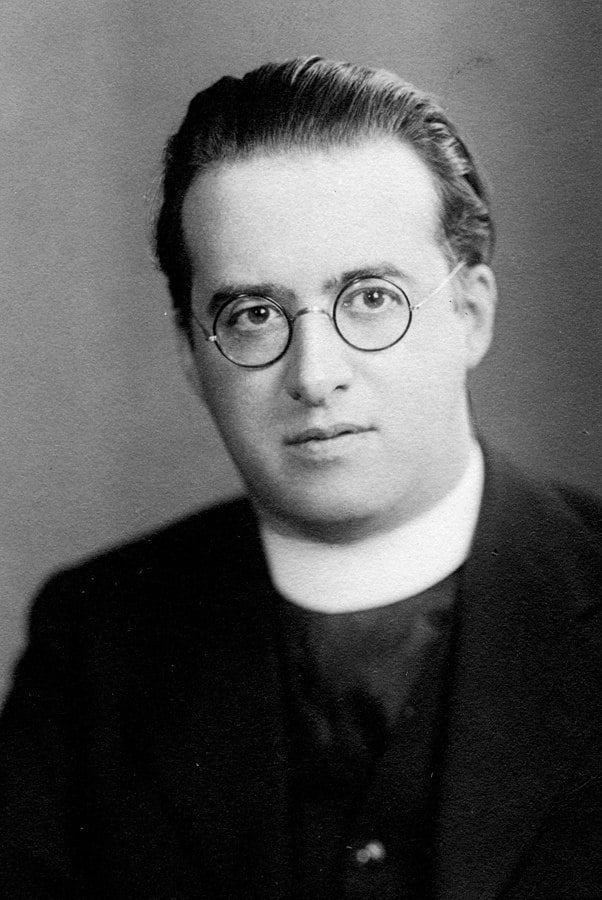
- Lemaître in the early 1930s
- Born: Georges Henri Joseph Édouard Lemaître; 17 July 1894; Charleroi, Belgium
- Died: 20 June 1966 (aged 71); Leuven, Belgium
- Education: Catholic University of Louvain; St Edmund's House, Cambridge; Massachusetts Institute of Technology (MIT)
- Known for: Big Bang; Hubble–Lemaître law Friedmann–Lemaître–Robertson–Walker metric Lemaître–Tolman metric Lemaître coordinates Cosmological constant
- Awards: Francqui Prize (1934); Prix Jules Janssen (1936); Eddington Medal (1953)
- Scientific career
- Fields: Physical cosmology, Astrophysics, Mathematics
- Workplaces: Catholic University of Louvain
- Doctoral advisor: Charles Jean de la Vallée-Poussin (Louvain), Paul Heymans (MIT)
- Other academic advisors: Arthur Eddington, Harlow Shapley

Ecclesiastical career
- Church: Catholic Church
- Ordained: 22 September 1923 by Désiré-Joseph Mercier

Georges Henri Joseph Édouard Lemaître (/ləˈmɛtrə/ lə-MET-rə; French: [ʒɔʁʒ ləmɛːtʁ]; 17 July 1894 – 20 June 1966) was a Belgian Catholic priest, theoretical physicist, and mathematician who made major contributions to cosmology and astrophysics. He was the first to argue that the recession of galaxies is evidence of an expanding universe and to connect the observational Hubble–Lemaître law with the solution to the Einstein field equations in the general theory of relativity for a homogenous and isotropic universe. That work led Lemaître to propose what he called the "hypothesis of the primeval atom", now regarded as the first formulation of the Big Bang theory of the origin of the universe.

Lemaître studied engineering, mathematics, physics, and philosophy at the Catholic University of Louvain and was ordained as a priest of the Archdiocese of Mechelen in 1923. His ecclesiastical superior and mentor, Cardinal Désiré-Joseph Mercier, encouraged and supported his scientific work, allowing Lemaître to travel to England, where he worked with the astrophysicist Arthur Eddington at the University of Cambridge in 1923–1924, and to the United States, where he worked with Harlow Shapley at the Harvard College Observatory and at the Massachusetts Institute of Technology (MIT) in 1924–1925.

Lemaître was a professor of physics at Louvain from 1927 until his retirement in 1964. A pioneer in the use of computers in physics research, in the 1930s he showed, with Manuel Sandoval Vallarta of MIT, that cosmic rays are deflected by the Earth's magnetic field and must therefore carry electric charge. Lemaître also argued in favor of including a positive cosmological constant in the Einstein field equations, both for conceptual reasons and to help reconcile the age of the universe inferred from the Hubble–Lemaître law with the ages of the oldest stars and the abundances of radionuclides.

Father Lemaître remained until his death a secular priest of the Archdiocese of Mechelen (after 1961, the "Archdiocese of Mechelen-Brussels"). In 1935, he was made an honorary canon of St. Rumbold's Cathedral. In 1960, Pope John XXIII appointed him as Domestic Prelate entitling him to be addressed as "Monsignor". In that same year he was appointed as president of the Pontifical Academy of Sciences, a post that he occupied until his death. Among other awards, Lemaître received the first Eddington Medal of the Royal Astronomical Society in 1953, "for his work on the expansion of the universe."

== Early life ==
Georges Henri Joseph Édouard Lemaître was born in Charleroi, Belgium, the eldest of four children of Joseph Lemaître, a prosperous industrialist who owned a glassworks factory, and Marguerite née Lannoy, who was the daughter of a brewer. Georges was educated at the Collège du Sacré-Cœur, a grammar school in Charleroi run by the Jesuits. In 1910, after a fire destroyed the glassworks, the family moved to Brussels, where Joseph had found a new position as manager for the French bank Société Générale. Georges then became a pupil at another Jesuit school, St. Michael's College. Although he had expressed his interest in pursuing a religious vocation, his father convinced him to attend university first and to train as a mining engineer.

=== University studies and military service ===
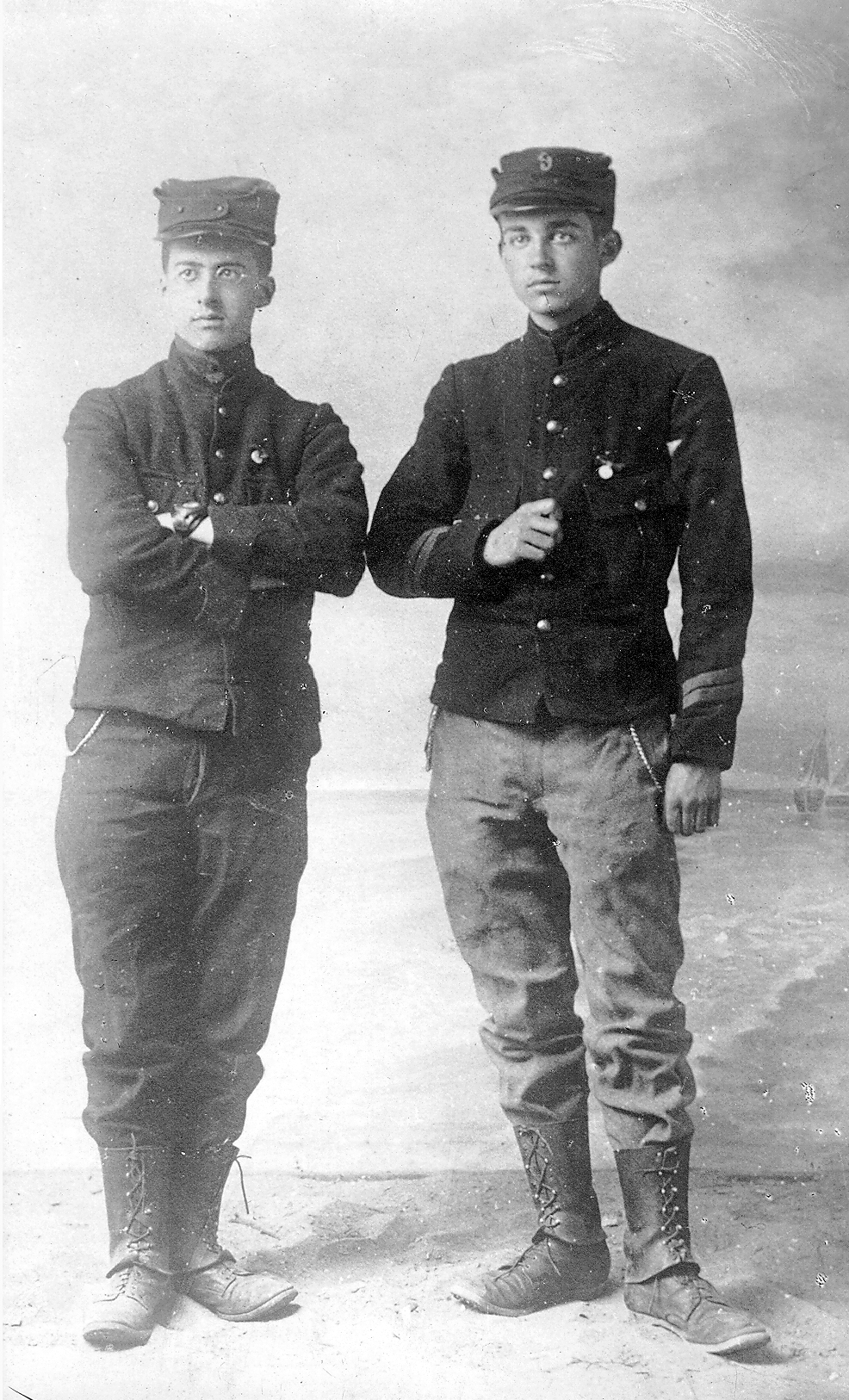
Georges Lemaître (left) and his younger brother Jacques (right) in uniform after they volunteered for the Belgian Army on 7 August 1914

In 1911, Lemaître began to study engineering at the Catholic University of Louvain. In 1914, after the outbreak of World War I, Lemaître interrupted his studies to volunteer for the Belgian army. He participated in the Battle of the Yser, in which the Belgians succeeded in halting the German advance. When the army transferred him from the infantry to artillery, Lemaître was sent to complete a course on ballistics. His prospects of promotion to officer rank were dashed after he was marked down for insubordination as a result of pointing out to the instructor a mathematical error in the official artillery manual. However, at the end of hostilities he received the Belgian War Cross with bronze palm, one of only five rank-and-file troops to receive that award from the hands of King Albert I.

Lemaître was an admirer of the French Catholic writer Léon Bloy. During a leave from his military service in World War I, Lemaître visited Bloy in Bourg-la-Reine, near Paris, where Bloy was living in a house that had belonged to his late friend and fellow writer Charles Péguy. On that occasion, Lemaître shared with Bloy an essay entitled Les trois premières paroles de Dieu ("The First Three Words of God"), in which he attempted to reconcile the Genesis creation narrative with modern science. Bloy, however, was unimpressed and advised Lemaître to grow more familiar with the works of the Church Fathers. This experience may have contributed to Lemaître's abandonment of the "concordist" effort to reconcile theological and scientific knowledge at a common intellectual level. Years later, Einstein questioned Lemaître on the idea of concordism. Lemaître opposed the idea that faith and science are opposed, but also acknowledged that concordism was invalid. He argued, "Should a priest reject relativity because it contains no authoritative exposition on the doctrine of the Trinity? Once you realize that the Bible does not purport to be a textbook of science, the old controversy between religion and science vanishes"

After the war, Lemaître abandoned engineering for the study of physics and mathematics. In 1919 he also completed the course taught at the Higher Institute of Philosophy, established by Cardinal Désiré-Joseph Mercier to promote neo-Thomism. Lemaître obtained his doctorate in science in 1920 with a thesis titled L'approximation des fonctions de plusieurs variables réelles ("The approximation of functions of several real variables"), written under the direction of mathematician Charles de la Vallée-Poussin.

=== Religious training ===
Lemaître had considered joining the Jesuits or the Benedictines, but finally decided to prepare instead for the diocesan priesthood. Between 1920 and 1923 he was a student at the Maison Saint-Rombaut, the seminary for "late vocations" (i.e., mature students for the priesthood) of the Archdiocese of Mechelen. It was during his spare time at the seminary that Lemaître learned the general theory of relativity. He was ordained as a priest on 22 September 1923 by Cardinal Mercier. As a diocesan priest in French-speaking Belgium, he was known as "Abbé Lemaître".

At the seminary, Lemaître joined the Fraternité sacerdotale des Amis de Jésus ("Priestly fraternity of the Friends of Jesus"), which had been created by Cardinal Mercier to promote the spiritual life of select diocesan priests and which was established canonically by his successor, Cardinal Jozef-Ernest van Roey. As a member of the fraternity, Lemaître took vows of chastity, poverty, and obedience, as well as special votum immolationis ("vow of immolation") promising complete submission to the person of Christ. In the spirit of the fraternity, Lemaître did not discuss his involvement with the Amis de Jésus outside of the group, but he regularly made silent retreats in a house called Regina Pacis ("Queen of Peace") in Schilde, near Antwerp, and also undertook translations of the mystical works of John of Ruusbroec.

=== Voyage to Britain and the US ===
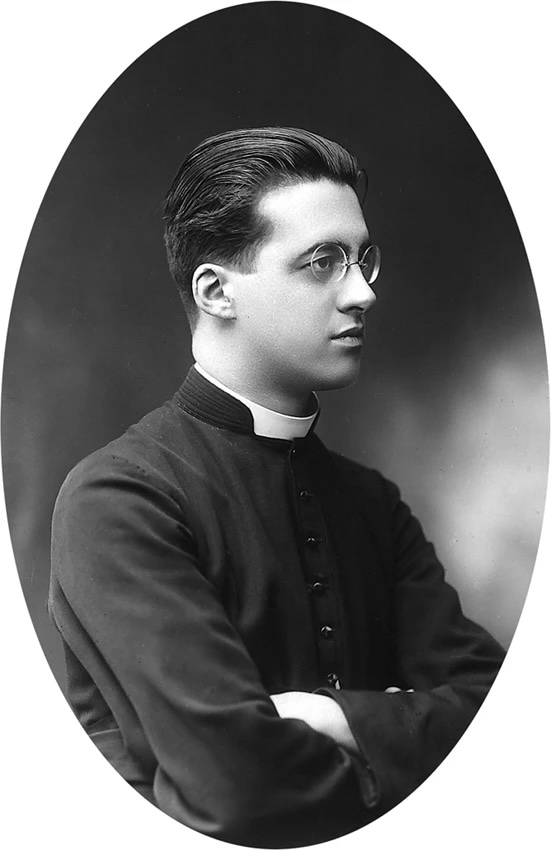
A young Georges Lemaître in clerical dress, early 1920s

In 1922, Lemaître applied to the Belgian Ministry of Sciences and Arts for a travel bursary. As part of that application, he submitted a thesis on the astronomical implications of general relativity that included a demonstration that the most general form of the Einstein field equations included a cosmological constant term. The jury awarded Lemaître a prize of 8,000 Belgian francs.

Cardinal Mercier supported Lemaître's scientific work and helped him to obtain further financial support for a two-year visit to Great Britain and the United States. Only ten days after his ordination, Lemaître left Belgium to take up residence at St Edmund's House, then a community of Catholic priests studying for degrees at the University of Cambridge and which would later become St Edmund's College. At Cambridge, Lemaître was a research associate in astronomy and worked with the eminent astrophysicist Arthur Eddington, who introduced Lemaître to modern cosmology, stellar astronomy, and numerical analysis.

Lemaître then spent the following year at the Harvard College Observatory, in Cambridge, Massachusetts, working with Harlow Shapley, a leading expert in the study of what were then called "spiral nebulae" (now identified as spiral galaxies). Lemaître also registered at that time in the doctoral program in science at the Massachusetts Institute of Technology (MIT), with the Belgian engineer Paul Heymans as his official advisor.

== Work on cosmology ==
On his return to Belgium in 1925, Lemaître became a part-time lecturer at the Catholic University of Louvain and began working on a report that was finally published in 1927 in the Annales de la Société Scientifique de Bruxelles ("Annals of the Scientific Society of Brussels"), under the title Un Univers homogène de masse constante et de rayon croissant rendant compte de la vitesse radiale des nébuleuses extragalactiques ("A homogeneous Universe of constant mass and growing radius accounting for the radial velocity of extragalactic nebulae"). There he developed (independently of the earlier work of Alexander Friedmann) the argument that the equations of Albert Einstein's general theory of relativity implied that the Universe is not static (see Friedmann equations). Lemaître connected this prediction to what he argued was a simple relation of proportionality between the average recessional velocity of galaxies and their distance to the Earth.

This 1927 paper had little impact because the Annales de la Société Scientifique de Bruxelles were not widely read by astronomers or physicists outside of Belgium. Moreover, in this 1927 paper Lemaître assumed a universe with a positive cosmological constant, but at this time, Einstein insisted that only a universe in which the cosmological constant had the precise value to make it static was physically acceptable. Lemaître later recalled Einstein saying to him: "vos calculs sont corrects, mais votre physique est abominable" ("your calculations are correct, but your physics is abominable").

Also in 1927, Lemaître returned to MIT to defend his doctoral dissertation on The gravitational field in a fluid sphere of uniform invariant density according to the theory of relativity. Upon obtaining that second doctorate, Lemaître was appointed ordinary professor at the Catholic University of Louvain.

=== Hubble-Lemaître law ===
According to the Big Bang theory, the universe emerged from an extremely dense and hot state (singularity). Space itself has been expanding ever since, carrying galaxies with it, like raisins in a rising loaf of bread. The graphic scheme above is an artist's conception illustrating the expansion of a portion of a flat universe.

In 1929, the US astronomer Edwin Hubble published a paper in the Proceedings of the National Academy of Sciences of the United States of America showing, based on better and more abundant data than what Lemaître had had at his disposal in 1927, that, in the average, galaxies recede at a velocity proportional to their distance from the observer. Although Hubble himself did not interpret that result in terms of an expanding Universe, his work attracted widespread attention and soon convinced many experts, including Einstein, that the Universe is not static. The proportionality between distance and recessional velocity for galaxies has since been commonly known as "Hubble's law", but in 2018 the International Astronomical Union (IAU) adopted a resolution recommending that it be referred to as the "Hubble-Lemaître law".

In 1931, an English translation of Lemaître's 1927 report appeared in the Monthly Notices of the Royal Astronomical Society, with a commentary by Arthur Eddington that characterized Lemaître's work as a "brilliant solution" to the outstanding problems of cosmology and a response by Lemaître to Eddington's comments. This English translation, however, omitted Lemaître's estimate of the "Hubble constant" for reasons that remained unclear for many years. The issue was clarified in 2011 by Mario Livio: Lemaître himself removed those paragraphs when he prepared the English translation, opting instead to cite the stronger results that Hubble had published in 1929.

=== Hypothesis of the primeval atom ===
In March 1931 Lemaître wrote a brief report in which he proposed that the universe expanded from a single initial quantum, which he called the "primeval atom". This was published in Nature, and later that year Lemaître participated in a public colloquium on "The Evolution of the Universe" held in London on 29 September 1931 to mark the centenary of the British Association for the Advancement of Science.

Lemaître's theory was first presented to a general audience in the December 1932 issue of Popular Science, in a piece written by the astronomer Donald Howard Menzel of Harvard University. In 1933–1934, Lemaître was a guest professor at the Catholic University of America, in Washington, D.C. At that time he also presented his work on the "Evolution of the Expanding Universe" before the US National Academy of Sciences. Lemaître became a scientific celebrity and newspapers around the world referred to him as the leader of a new physical cosmology.

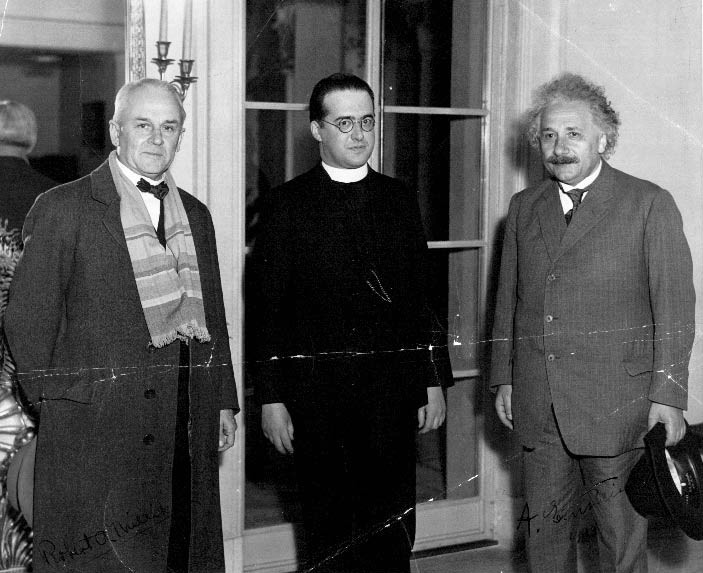
Robert Millikan, Lemaître and Albert Einstein after Lemaître's lecture at the California Institute of Technology in January 1933.

Lemaître and Einstein met on four occasions: in 1927 in Brussels, at the time of a Solvay Conference; in 1932 in Belgium, at the time of a cycle of conferences in Brussels; in California in January 1933; and in 1935 at Princeton. In 1933 at the California Institute of Technology, after Lemaître presented his theory, Einstein stood up, applauded, and is reported to have said, "This is the most beautiful and satisfactory explanation of creation to which I have ever listened." However, there is disagreement over the reporting of this quote in the newspapers of the time, and it may be that Einstein was not referring to the "primordial atom" theory as a whole, but only to Lemaître's proposal that cosmic rays could be "fossils" of the primordial decay.

Lemaître argued that cosmic rays could be a "fossil radiation" produced by the decay of the primeval atom. Much of his work in the 1930s was focused on cosmic rays. In 1946, Lemaître published a book on L'Hypothèse de l'Atome Primitif ("The Primeval Atom Hypothesis"), which was translated into Spanish in the same year and into English in 1950. The astronomer Fred Hoyle introduced the term "Big Bang" in a 1949 BBC radio broadcast to refer to cosmological theories such as Lemaître's, according to which the Universe has a beginning in time. Hoyle remained throughout his life an opponent of such "Big Bang" theories, advocating instead a steady-state model of an eternal Universe.

In 1948, theoreticians Ralph Alpher, Robert Herman, and George Gamow predicted a different form of "fossil radiation" based on the Big Bang model, now known as the cosmic microwave background (CMB). The CMB was produced when the contents of the expanding Universe cooled sufficiently that they became transparent to electromagnetic radiation. In 1965, shortly before his death, Lemaître learned from his assistant Odon Godart of the recent discovery of the CMB by radio astronomers Arno Penzias and Robert Wilson. That discovery convinced most experts of the scientific validity of the Big Bang.

=== Cosmological constant ===
Lemaître maintained throughout his career that the Einstein field equations should incorporate a positive cosmological constant ($\Lambda$) term. His reasoning was based on both theoretical and empirical considerations. Lemaître argued in 1958 that "if some extension of relativity towards a broader field, such as quantum theory, has to be achieved the superfluous $\Lambda$ term shall be very much welcomed". He also held that the accelerating expansion of the universe induced by $\Lambda$ could help to reconcile the age of the universe deduced from the Hubble-Lemaître law with the ages of the oldest stars and the observed abundances of radionuclides. Lemaître argued for a positive cosmological constant both in print and in correspondence with Einstein, who was skeptical about the reality of such a term after abandoning his model of a static universe in the early 1930s. The Nobel Prize in Physics for 2011 was awarded to Saul Perlmutter, Brian P. Schmidt, and Adam G. Riess for establishing the reality of the universe's accelerating expansion, based on extensive surveys of Type Ia supernovae used as astronomical "standard candles". In the scientific background for that prize, the Royal Swedish Academy of Sciences credited Lemaître with the idea that such an acceleration is driven by vacuum energy, also modernly called in this context dark energy.

=== Views on relation between science and faith ===
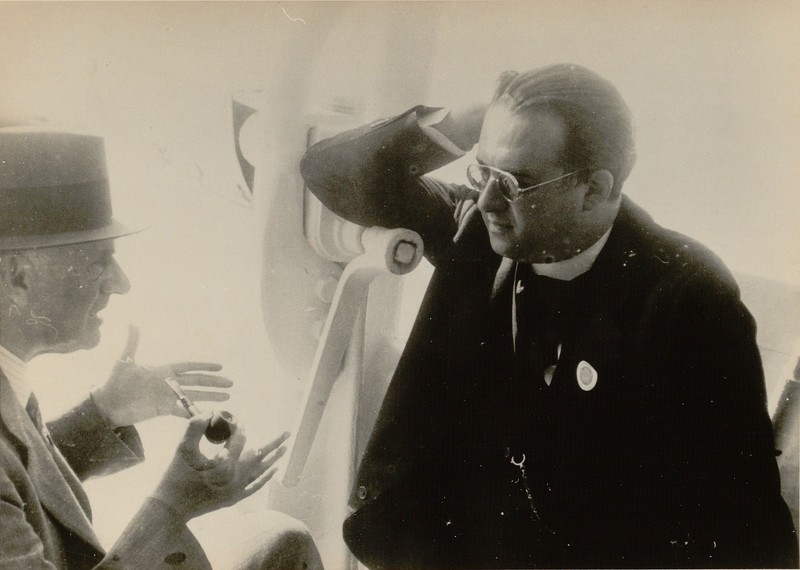
Lemaître and Arthur Eddington in discussion while sailing back from the 6th General Assembly of the International Astronomical Union, held in Stockholm in 1938

Initially, Lemaître supported concordism. In 1917, he attempted to prove the creation story of Genesis 1, specifically the idea of ex nihilo nihil fit (out of nothing, nothing comes). He reasoned:

It is impossible for any body to subsist without emanating light, as all bodies at a certain temperature emit radiation of all wavelengths (theory of black bodies). In a physical sense, absolute darkness is nothingness.… Before the Fiat lux, there was absolutely no light and therefore absolutely nothing existed.

Eventually, he abandoned his studies on light, and focused instead on studying relativity.

After rejecting concordism, Lemaître viewed his work as a scientist as neither supporting nor contradicting any truths of the Catholic faith, and he was strongly opposed to making any arguments that mixed science with religion, although he held that the two were not in conflict. In a 1933 New York Times article, he asserted, "There is no conflict between religion and science to reconcile." He was always anxious that his work on cosmology should be judged on purely scientific criteria; he feared that combining the two (concordism) would both hinder scientific acceptance and misrepresent the faith.

In 1951, Pope Pius XII gave an address to the Pontifical Academy of Sciences, with Lemaître in the audience, in which he drew a parallel between the new Big Bang cosmology and the Christian doctrine of creatio ex nihilo:

Indeed, it seems that the science of today, by going back in one leap millions of centuries, has succeeded in being a witness to that primordial Fiat Lux, when, out of nothing, there burst forth with matter a sea of light and radiation [... Thus modern science has confirmed] with the concreteness of physical proofs the contingency of the universe and the well-founded deduction that about that time the cosmos issued from the hand of the Creator.

Lemaître was reportedly horrified by that intervention and was later able, with the assistance of Father Daniel O'Connell, the director of the Vatican Observatory, to convince the Pope not make any further public statements on religious or philosophical interpretations of matters concerning physical cosmology.

According to the theoretical physicist and Nobel laureate Paul Dirac,

Once when I was talking with Lemaître about [his cosmological theory] and feeling stimulated by the grandeur of the picture that he has given us, I told him that I thought cosmology was the branch of science that lies closest to religion. However Lemaître did not agree with me. After thinking it over he suggested psychology as lying closest to religion.

== Other scientific work ==
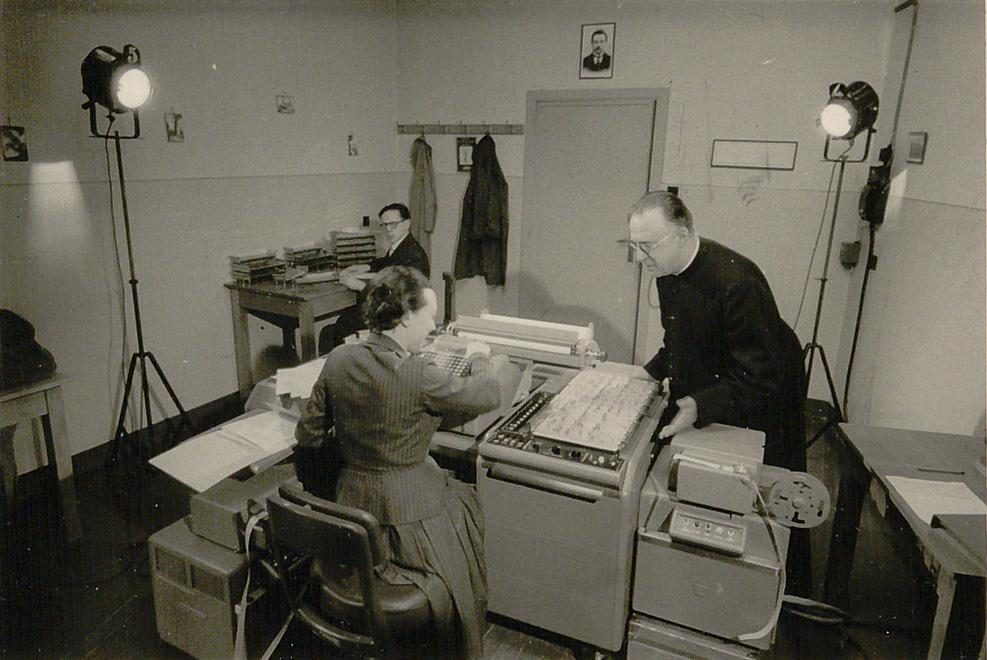
Georges Lemaître and Andrée Bartholomé using a Burroughs E101 computer in the numerical research laboratory of the Catholic University of Louvain, May 1959 (Archives de l'Université catholique de Louvain)

With Manuel Sandoval Vallarta, whom he had met at MIT, Lemaître showed that the intensity of cosmic rays varies with latitude because they are composed of charged particles and therefore are deflected by the Earth's magnetic field. In their calculations, Lemaître and Vallarta made use of MIT's new differential analyzer computer, developed by Vannevar Bush. That work disproved the view, advocated among others by the Nobel laureate Robert Millikan, that cosmic rays were composed of high-energy photons. Lemaître and Vallarta also worked on a theory of primary cosmic radiation and applied it to their investigations of the Sun's magnetic field and the effects of the galaxy's rotation.

In 1933, Lemaître found an important inhomogeneous solution of Einstein's field equations describing a spherical dust cloud, the Lemaître–Tolman metric. He became increasingly interested in problems of numerical computation and in the 1930s began to use the most powerful calculator available at the time, the mechanical Mercedes-Euklid. In his only work in physical chemistry, Lemaître collaborated in the numerical calculation of the energy levels of monodeuteroethyelene (a molecule of ethylene with one of its hydrogen atoms replaced by deuterium).

In 1948 Lemaître published a mathematical essay titled Quaternions et espace elliptique ("Quaternions and elliptic space"). William Kingdon Clifford had introduced the concept of elliptic space in 1873. Lemaître developed the theory of quaternions from first principles, in the spirit of the Erlangen program.

Lemaître also worked on the three-body problem, introducing a new method of regularization to avoid singularities associated with the collisions of two bodies. In the 1950s he worked out an early version of the fast Fourier transform, later developed independently by James Cooley and John Tukey. He introduced the Burroughs E101 electromechanical computer to his university in the late 1950s. In his later years he collaborated with his nephew Gilbert Lemaître on a new programming language called "Velocode", a precursor of BASIC.

== Final years ==
During the 1950s, Lemaître gradually gave up part of his teaching workload, ending it completely when he took emeritus status in 1964. In 1960 he was named domestic prelate (with the treatment of "Monsignor") by Pope John XXIII. Following the death of the physician and Capuchin friar Agostino Gemelli, Lemaître was appointed to succeed him as the second president of the Pontifical Academy of Sciences.

During the Second Vatican Council of 1962–65, the pope asked Lemaître to serve on the 4th session of the Pontifical Commission on Birth Control. However, since his health made it impossible for him to travel to Rome —he suffered a heart attack in December 1964— Lemaître demurred. He told a Dominican colleague, Père Henri de Riedmatten, that he thought it was dangerous for a mathematician to venture outside of his area of expertise. Lemaître died on 20 June 1966, shortly after having learned of the discovery of cosmic microwave background radiation, which provided solid experimental support for his theory of the Big Bang.

Lemaître was strongly opposed to the Leuven Vlaams ("Flemish Leuven") movement that sought to make instruction at the Catholic University of Leuven monolingual in Dutch. With the historian Gérard Garitte, in 1962 Lemaître established the Association du corps académique et du personnel scientifique de l'Université de Louvain (ACAPSUL, "Association of the faculty and scientific personnel of the University of Louvain") to advocate for the continued use of the French language in that institution. After Lemaître's death, the university was separated into a Dutch-speaking institution, KU Leuven, and a French-speaking institution, UCLouvain, based in the planned town of Louvain-la-Neuve ("New Leuven") that was built for that purpose just across the language border in Walloon Brabant.

== Honours and recognition ==
On 27 July 1935 Lemaître was appointed as an honorary canon of St. Rumbold's Cathedral by Cardinal Jozef-Ernest van Roey. He was elected a member of the Pontifical Academy of Sciences in 1936, and took an active role there, serving as its president from March 1960 until his death. In 1941, he was elected a member of the Royal Academy of Sciences and Arts of Belgium.

On 17 March 1934, Lemaître received the Francqui Prize, the highest Belgian scientific distinction, from King Leopold III. His proposers were Albert Einstein, Charles de la Vallée-Poussin and Alexandre de Hemptinne. The members of the international jury were Eddington, Langevin, Théophile de Donder and Marcel Dehalu. The same year he received the Mendel Medal of the Villanova University.

In 1936, Lemaître received the Prix Jules Janssen, the highest award of the Société astronomique de France, the French astronomical society. Another distinction that the Belgian government reserves for exceptional scientists was allotted to him in 1950: the decennial prize for applied sciences for the period 1933–1942. Lemaître was elected to the American Philosophical Society in 1945. In 1953, he was given the inaugural Eddington Medal by the Royal Astronomical Society.

In 2005, Lemaître was voted to the 61st place of De Grootste Belg ("The Greatest Belgian"), a Flemish television program on the VRT. In the same year he was voted to the 78th place by the audience of the Les plus grands Belges ("The Greatest Belgians"), a television show of the RTBF. Later, in December 2022, VRT recovered in its archives a lost 20-minute interview with Georges Lemaître in 1964, "a gem", says cosmologist Thomas Hertog. On 17 July 2018, Google Doodle celebrated Georges Lemaître's 124th birthday. On 26 October 2018, an electronic vote among all members of the International Astronomical Union voted 78% to recommend changing the name of the Hubble law to the Hubble–Lemaître law.

=== Namesakes ===
- The lunar crater Lemaître
- Friedmann–Lemaître–Robertson–Walker metric
- Lemaître coordinates
- Lemaître–Tolman metric
- Hubble–Lemaître law
- Minor planet 1565 Lemaître
- The fifth Automated Transfer Vehicle, Georges Lemaître ATV
- Norwegian indie electronic band Lemaitre
- The Maison Georges Lemaître is the main building of the UCLouvain's Charleroi campus, adjacent to Lemaître's birthplace

== Bibliography ==
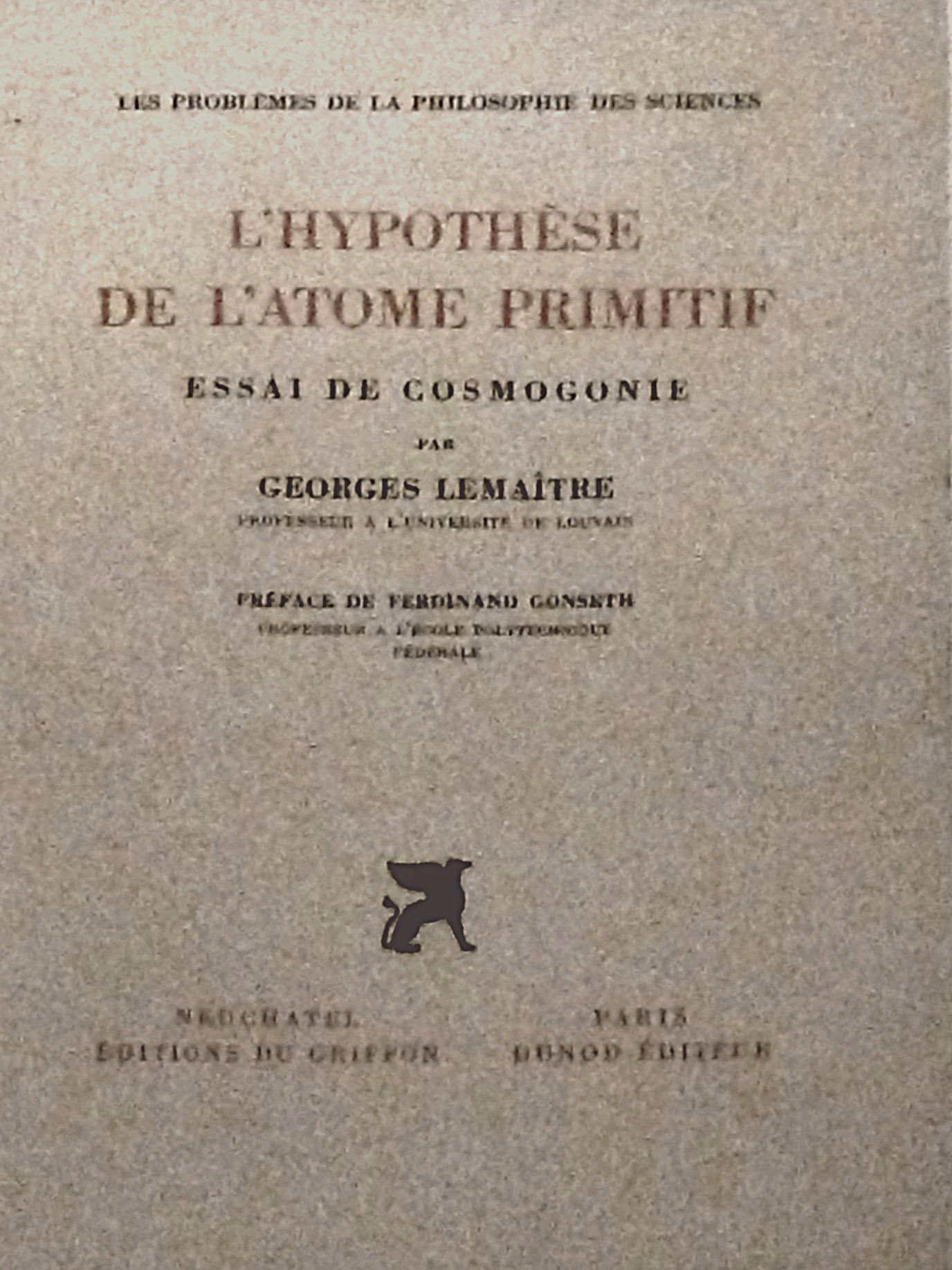
"L'Hypothèse de l'Atome primitif" (The Primeval Atom – an Essay on Cosmogony) (1946)

- G. Lemaître, L'Hypothèse de l'atome primitif. Essai de cosmogonie, Neuchâtel (Switzerland), Editions du Griffon, and Brussels, Editions Hermès, 1946
- G. Lemaître, The Primeval Atom – An Essay on Cosmogony, New York-London, D. Van Nostrand Co, 1950.
  - "The Primeval Atom," in Munitz, Milton K., ed., Theories of the Universe, The Free Press, 1957.
- The gravitational field in a fluid sphere of uniform invariant density according, to the theory of relativity; Note on de Sitter ̕Universe; Note on the theory of pulsating stars (PDF), Massachusetts Institute of Technology. Dept. Of Physics, 1927b
- "Un Univers homogène de masse constante et de rayon croissant rendant compte de la vitesse radiale des nébuleuses extra-galactiques". Annales de la Société Scientifique de Bruxelles (in French). 47: 49–59. 1927a. Bibcode:1927ASSB...47...49L.
  - (Translated in: "A Homogeneous Universe of Constant Mass and Increasing Radius Accounting for the Radial Velocity of Extra-galactic Nebulae". Monthly Notices of the Royal Astronomical Society. 91 (5): 483–490. 1931. Bibcode:1931MNRAS..91..483L. doi:10.1093/mnras/91.5.483.)
- "Expansion of the universe, The expanding universe". Monthly Notices of the Royal Astronomical Society. 91: 490–501. 1931a. Bibcode:1931MNRAS..91..490L. doi:10.1093/mnras/91.5.490.
- "The Beginning of the World from the Point of View of Quantum Theory". Nature. 127 (3210): 706. 1931b. Bibcode:1931Natur.127..706L. doi:10.1038/127706b0. ISSN 1476-4687. S2CID 4089233.
- "The Evolution of the Universe: Discussion". Nature. 128 (3234): 699–701. 1931c. Bibcode:1931Natur.128..704L. doi:10.1038/128704a0. S2CID 4028196.
- "Evolution of the Expanding Universe". Proceedings of the National Academy of Sciences of the United States of America. 20 (1): 12–17. 1934. Bibcode:1934PNAS...20...12L. doi:10.1073/pnas.20.1.12. ISSN 0027-8424. PMC 1076329. PMID 16587831.
