= 1565 Lemaître =

Mars-crossing asteroid

Discovery
- Discovered by: S. Arend
- Discovery site: Uccle Obs.
- Discovery date: 25 November 1948

Designations
- Named after: Georges Lemaître (astronomer, priest)
- Alternative designations: 1948 WA
- Minor planet category: Mars-crosser · Phocaea

Orbital characteristics
- Epoch 4 September 2017 (JD 2458000.5)
- Uncertainty parameter 0
- Observation arc: 68.44 yr (24,997 days)
- Aphelion: 3.2262 AU
- Perihelion: 1.5613 AU
- Semi-major axis: 2.3938 AU
- Eccentricity: 0.3478
- Orbital period (sidereal): 3.70 yr (1,353 days)
- Mean anomaly: 236.28°
- Mean motion: 0° 15^{m} 57.96^{s} / day
- Inclination: 21.485°
- Longitude of ascending node: 261.16°
- Argument of perihelion: 116.34°

Physical characteristics
- Dimensions: 6.90±1.45 km 7.949±1.558 km 8.00±0.58 km 8.76 km (calculated)
- Synodic rotation period: 2.4±0.1 h 11.403±0.003 h
- Geometric albedo: 0.22±0.14; 0.23 (assumed); 0.239±0.096; 0.334±0.051
- Spectral type: SMASS = Sq · S
- Absolute magnitude (H): 12.30 · 12.5 · 12.95

1565 Lemaître (provisional designation 1948 WA) is a highly eccentric Phocaea asteroid and sizable Mars-crosser from the inner regions of the asteroid belt, approximately 8 kilometers in diameter. It was discovered on 25 November 1948, by Belgian astronomer Sylvain Arend at the Royal Observatory of Belgium in Uccle, Belgium. It was named after cosmologist and priest Georges Lemaître.

== Classification and orbit ==
Lemaître is a Mars-crossing asteroid, as it crosses the orbit of Mars at 1.666 AU. It is also an eccentric member of the Phocaea family (701). This asteroid orbits the Sun at a distance of 1.6–3.2 AU once every 3 years and 8 months (1,353 days). Its orbit has an eccentricity of 0.35 and an inclination of 21° with respect to the ecliptic. As no precoveries were taken, and no prior identifications were made, Lemaître's observation arc begins on the night following its official discovery observation.

== Physical characteristics ==
In the SMASS taxonomy, Lemaître is characterized as a Sq-type, a transitional class of stony S-type and Q-type asteroids.

=== Lightcurves ===
In September 2007, a rotational light-curve of Lemaître was obtained from photometric observations by American astronomer Brian D. Warner at his Palmer Divide Observatory, Colorado. It gave a rotation period of 11.403 hours with a brightness variation of 0.04 magnitude (U=2), superseding a provisional period of 2.4 hours with an amplitude of 0.03 magnitude, derived from photometric observations made by Arnaud Leroy, Bernard Trégon, Xavier Durivaud and Federico Manzini two months earlier (U=1+).

=== Diameter and albedo ===
According to the surveys carried out by the Japanese Akari satellite and NASA's Wide-field Infrared Survey Explorer with its subsequent NEOWISE mission, Lemaître measures between 6.90 and 8.00 kilometers in diameter, and its surface has an albedo between 0.22 and 0.334. The Collaborative Asteroid Lightcurve Link assumes a standard albedo for Phocaea asteroids of 0.23 – derived from 25 Phocaea, the family's most massiv member and namesake – and calculates a diameter of 8.76 kilometers based on an absolute magnitude of 12.5.

== Naming ==
This minor planet was named in honour of Belgian priest, astronomer and professor of physics, Georges Lemaître (1894–1966), widely regarded as the father of the Big Bang theory. The lunar crater Lemaître also bears his name. Lemaître was the first minor planet to be numbered after the end of World War II. The official naming citation was published by the Minor Planet Center on 1 June 1975 (M.P.C. 3824).
