= Lemaître (crater) =

Crater on the Moon

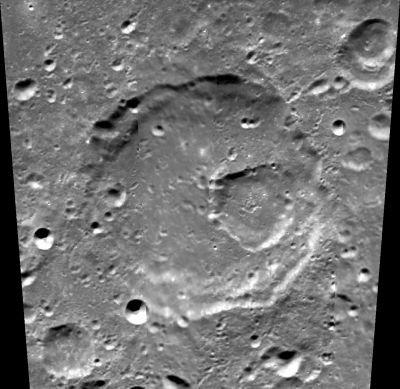
- Clementine mosaic
- Coordinates: 61.2°S 149.6°W
- Diameter: 91 km
- Depth: unknown
- Colongitude: 153° at sunrise
- Formation: Nectarian
- Eponym: Georges Lemaître

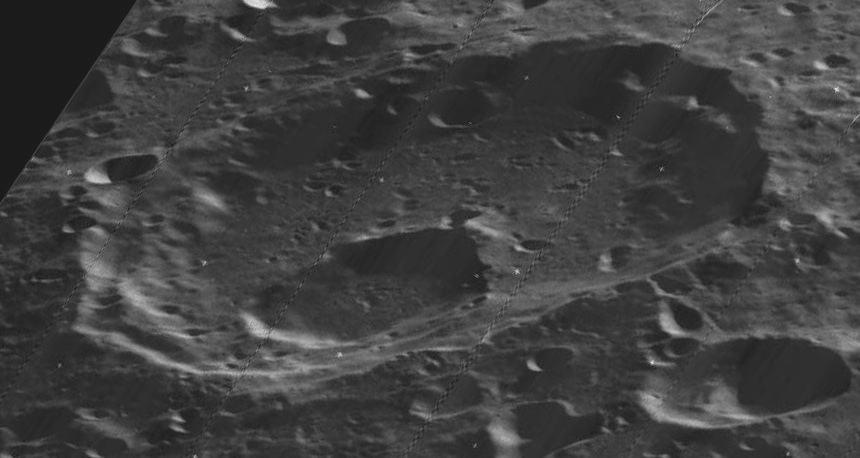
Oblique Lunar Orbiter 5 view

Lemaître is a lunar impact crater that is located on the southern hemisphere on the far side of the Moon. It lies to the south of the older crater Minkowski, and north of Crommelin. To the east-southeast lies the crater Eijkman.

On the lunar geologic timescale, this formation dates to the Nectarian period. The outer rim of Lemaître remains well-defined, although it has become eroded and rounded by a history of minor impacts. The rim is generally circular, but it has a polygonal, angular outline, particularly in the southeastern half. For much of circumference, the inner wall consists of a rim that slopes down to a slumped terrace, which then slopes down more gently to the interior floor.

There are a few tiny craterlets lying along the rim of Lemaître, especially in the west and the southeast. The most notable of these craterlets is a small, bowl-shaped crater that is attached to the southwestern rim.

The floor of the crater is generally flat, but contains a prominent crater Lemaître F along the eastern inner wall. This crater is also somewhat angular in shape, especially in the parts that are not concentric with the inner wall. The remainder of the floor is marked with a few tiny craterlets, the largest of which is adjacent to the western interior wall.

== Satellite craters ==
By convention these features are identified on lunar maps by placing the letter on the side of the crater midpoint that is closest to Lemaître.

Lemaître	Latitude	Longitude	Diameter
C	59.4° S	145.6° W	27 km
F	61.4° S	148.4° W	32 km
S	61.6° S	156.3° W	34 km

The floor of the satellite crater Lemaître F (within Lemaître itself) may be the lowest point on the Moon.

== See also ==
- 1565 Lemaître, asteroid
