= Cornelis Adrianus Pekelharing =

Dutch physiologist

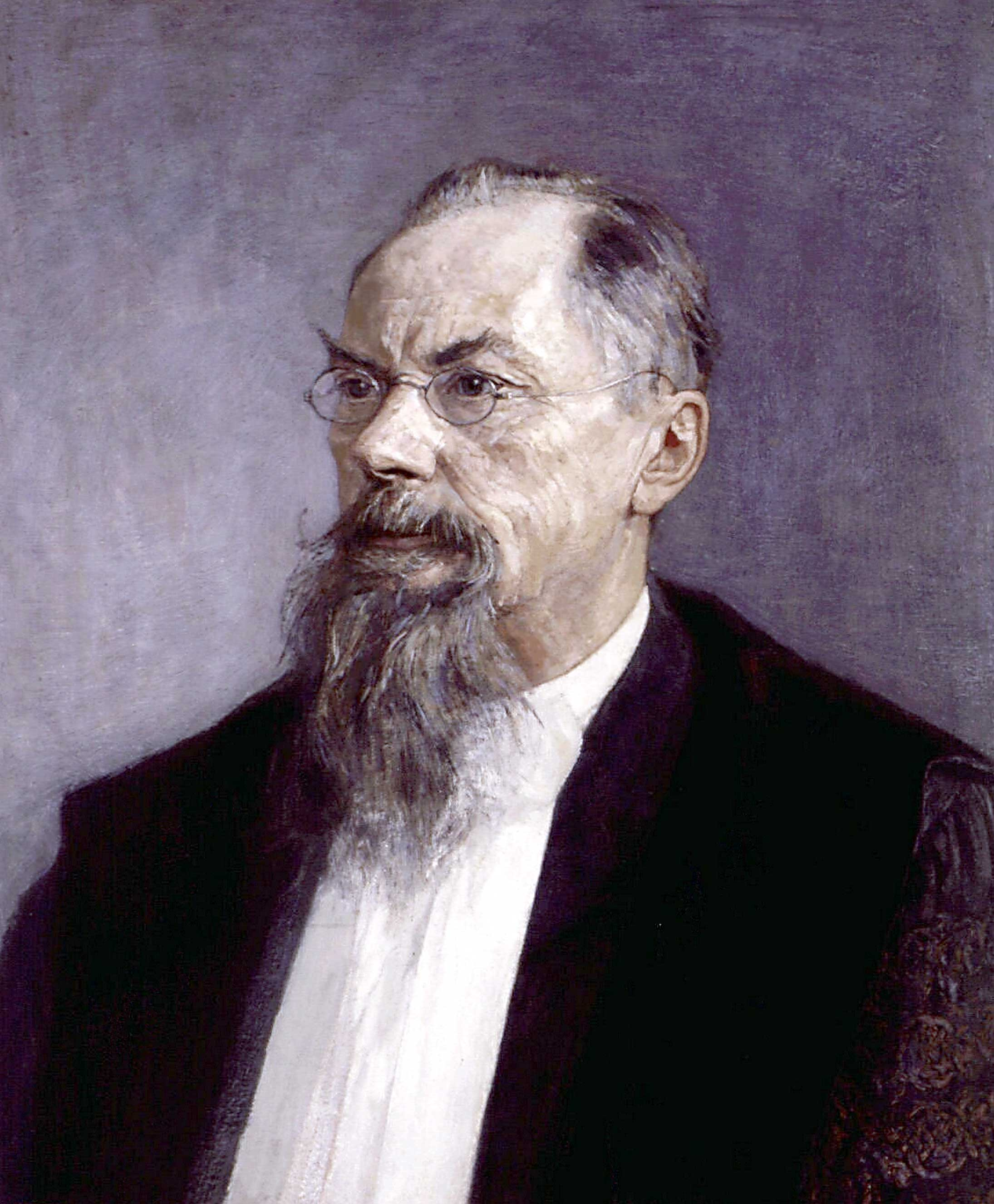
Portrait c. 1907 by Jan Pieter Veth

Cornelis 'Kees' Adrianus Pekelharing (19 July 1848 – 18 September 1922) was a Dutch physiologist who worked extensively on problems relating to nutrition and human metabolism.

Pekelharing was born in Zaandam, the sixth child of physician Cornelis and his wife Johanna van Ree. His early studies were in schools at Zaandam. Following the family tradition, he was admitted to study medicine at the University of Leiden in 1865 but his father thought he was too young and let him join after a year spent at home on private studies. During his studies at the University of Leiden, his research interests were sparked by Adriaan Heynsius who in turn had trained under Gerrit Jan Mulder. He also took an interest in histology under F.C. Donders, he joined the University of Utrecht. He received his license to practice medicine in 1872 and managed his father's practice while his parents vacationed abroad. His father died in 1873 and in the same year he married Willemine Geertruida Campert (d. 1897), a sister of a friend. Apart from medical practice he worked in Heynsius' laboratory and wrote a dissertation on the determination of urea in blood and tissues in 1874. Preferring research, he joined a teaching position in the veterinary school in Utrecht, a position suggested by Donders. He spent some in Leipzig under J. Cohnheim learning new laboratory techniques. In 1884 Pekelharing hired Cornelis Winkler with whom he conducted studies on nervous disorders. He collaborated with Professor Sape Talma on leucocytes and inflammation. A bout of sickness led to a period of rest and he was asked to visit Dutch Java in 1886 to examine beriberi. Along with Winkler the two noted that it involved polyneuritis and suggested a bacterial cause. Before leaving Java, Pekelharing suggested a more permanent research facility in Java, and this was taken up by the Dutch government and it was there that Christiaan Eijkman identified a dietary deficiency as the basis of beriberi. Pekelharing too conducted studies on diet with mice and noted the importance of various proteins. He helped establish the field of nutrition research in the Netherlands. He retired in 1918 and died in 1922 at his home in Utrecht.
