= Bernhard Dawson =

Argentine astronomer

Bernhard Hildebrandt Dawson (September 21, 1890 – June 18, 1960) was a U.S.-born Argentine astronomer.

He was born in Kansas City, Missouri, and earned a B.S. from the University of Michigan, 1916. From 1913 onward, he worked at the La Plata Observatory, Argentina. In 1933 he was awarded a Ph.D. from Michigan with a thesis titled, "The System Beta 1000 Plus Delta 31". He was a professor at Faculdad de Ingeniería de San Juan from 1948 until 1955. His astronomical studies included southern double stars, variable stars, occultations, asteroids and comets. On November 8, 1942, he may have discovered Nova Puppis 1942. In 1958, he became the first president of the Asociación Argentina de Astronomía.

The botanist Genoveva Dawson was his daughter.

The asteroid 1829 Dawson is named after him, as is the crater Dawson on the far side of the Moon.

== Bibliography ==
- Press, Jaques Cattell (1921). American Men of Science. Bowker. p. 170.
- Schmadel, Lutz D. (2003). Dictionary of minor planet names (5th rev. and enlarged ed.). Springer. ISBN 3-540-00238-3.
- Menzel, Donald H. (February 1971). "Final Report on NGR 22-007-194, Lunar Nomenclature" (PDF). NASA.
- Burnham, Robert (1978). Burnham's Celestial Handbook. Courier Dover Publications. ISBN 0-486-23673-0.
- "Reseña Histórica". Asociación Argentina de Astronomía.
- Pyenson, Lewis (1989). Empire of Reason: Exact Sciences in Indonesia, 1840-1940. BRILL. ISBN 90-04-08984-5.
- Dawson, Bernhard Hildebrandt (1933). "The System Beta 1000 Plus Delta 31". University of Michigan. Bibcode:1933PhDT.........1D.
