= Alekhine (disambiguation) =

Alexander Alekhine (1892–1946) is a Russian-French chess master and former world champion.

Alekhine may also refer to:

- Alekhine's Defence, a chess opening introduced by Alexander Alekhine
- Alekhine's gun, a chess formation named after Alexander Alekhine
- Alekhine Memorial, a 2013 chess tournament honoring Alexander Alekhine

== People with the surname ==
- Alexei Alekhine (1888–1939), Russian chess master and brother of Alexander
- Grace Alekhine (1876–1956), American-British-French artist, chess player, and wife of Alexander Alekhine

== See also ==
- Alekhin (disambiguation)
- Alyokhin (surname)
