= Minkowski (crater) =

Crater on the Moon

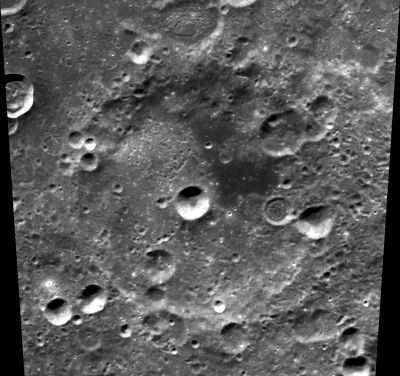
- Clementine mosaic
- Coordinates: 56.5°S 146.0°W
- Diameter: 113 km
- Depth: Unknown
- Colongitude: 148° at sunrise
- Eponym: Hermann Minkowski; Rudolph L. B. Minkowski

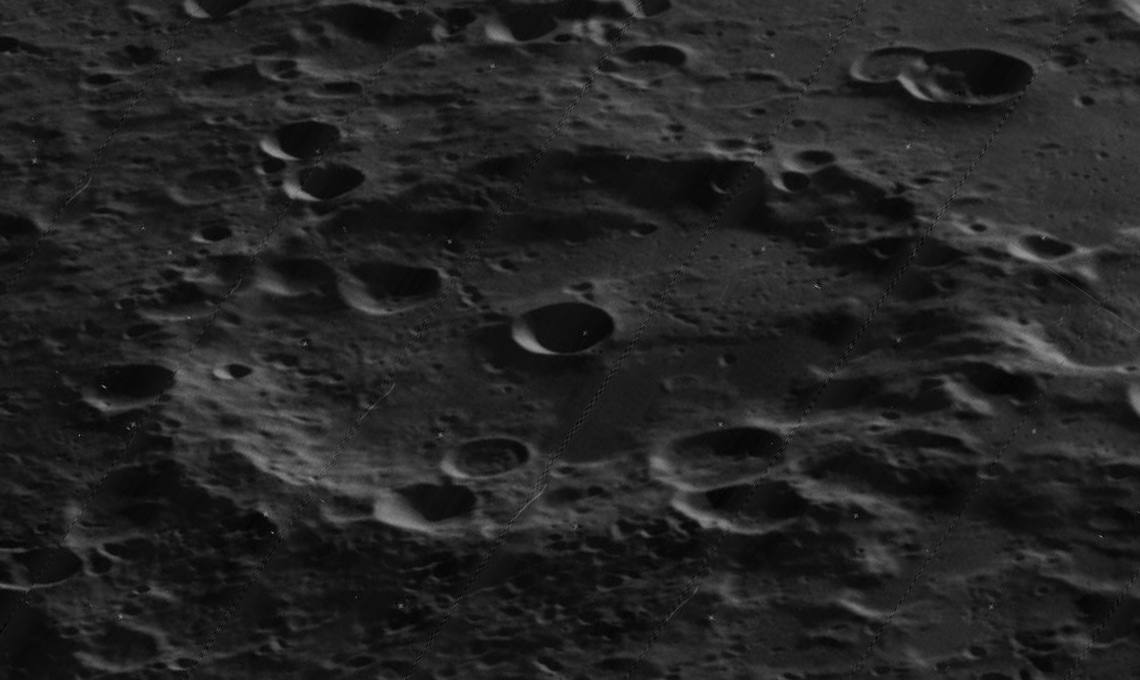
Oblique Lunar Orbiter 5 image

Minkowski is a crater on the far side of the Moon, in the lower latitudes of the southern hemisphere. The lunar crater lies about one crater diameter to the north-northeast of crater Lemaître, a formation of similar dimension. To the northwest of Minkowski is the flooded crater Baldet, and to the southeast lies Fizeau.

The outer rim of Minkowski is heavily eroded, and forms little more than an irregular circular ridge in the surface. Numerous craters lie across the rim, the most prominent being two pairs along the eastern edge. The interior floor is relatively level, with a dark patch in the northeast quadrant that is characteristic of a lava-flooded surface. There is a small bowl-shaped crater located prominently at the midpoint. Minkowski S lies along the southwestern edge of the floor. A number of tiny craterlets mark the interior surface, particularly in the southwest quadrant.

== Satellite craters ==
By convention these features are identified on lunar maps by placing the letter on the side of the crater midpoint that is closest to Minkowski.

Minkowski	Latitude	Longitude	Diameter
S	56.1° S	145.6° W	13 km

== See also ==
- 12493 Minkowski, main-belt asteroid
