= Eijkman (crater) =

Lunar impact crater

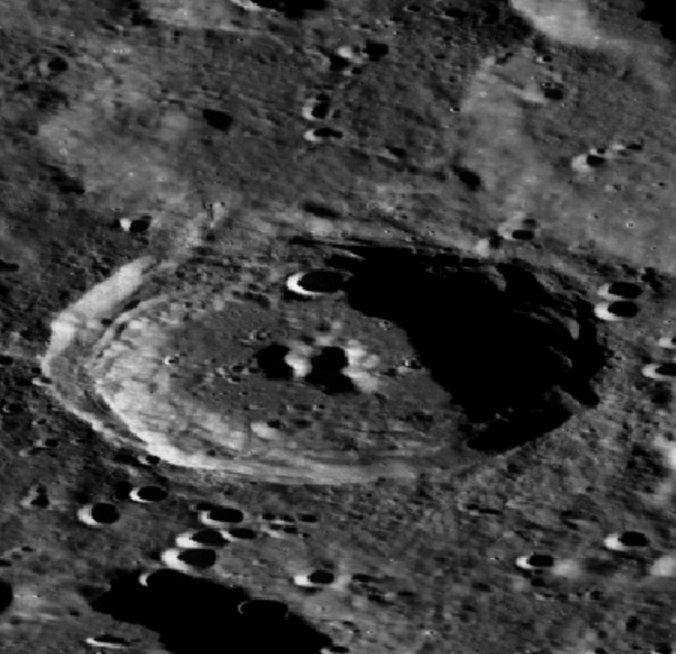
- Oblique view of Eijkman (LRO)
- Coordinates: 63.1°S 141.5°W
- Diameter: 56.36 km (35.02 mi)
- Depth: 3.5 km (2.2 mi)
- Colongitude: 144° at sunrise
- Formation: Nectarian
- Eponym: Christiaan Eijkman

Eijkman is a lunar impact crater that is located on the far side of the Moon's southern hemisphere. It lies about a half crater diameter to the southeast of the larger crater Lemaître. To the south-southwest is the crater Crommelin, and to the northeast is Fizeau. Eijkman lies within the South Pole-Aitken basin, in the western periphery.

On the lunar geologic timescale, Eijkman dates to the Nectarian period. The rim of this crater is well-defined and has not been significantly worn down by impacts. Nevertheless, there are a few tiny craterlets along the edge and a small craterlet along the northern inner wall. The inner walls display some minor terracing along the northwestern edge. Near the midpoint of the crater interior floor is a horseshoe-shaped central peak formation, with the open end pointing towards the south. The spectra of the central peak fits an olivine-bearing gabbroic norite mineralogy, which originated from a depth of 5.4 to 8.2 km.

This formation is named after the Dutch doctor and Nobel laureate Christiaan Eijkman (1858-1930). Its designation was officially adopted by the International Astronomical Union in 1970.

== Satellite craters ==
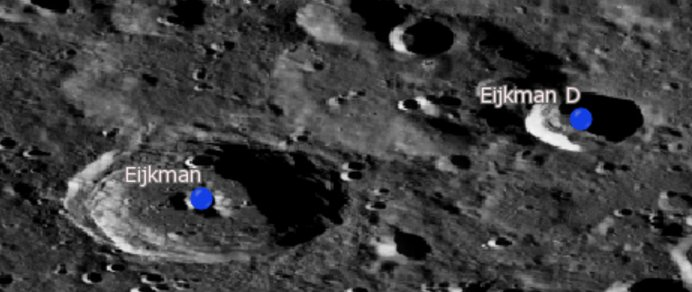
Satellite feature

By convention these features are identified on lunar maps by placing the letter on the side of the crater midpoint that is closest to Eijkman.

Eijkman	Latitude	Longitude	Diameter
D	62.3° S	136.9° W	25 km
