= CP Puppis =

Nova seen in 1942

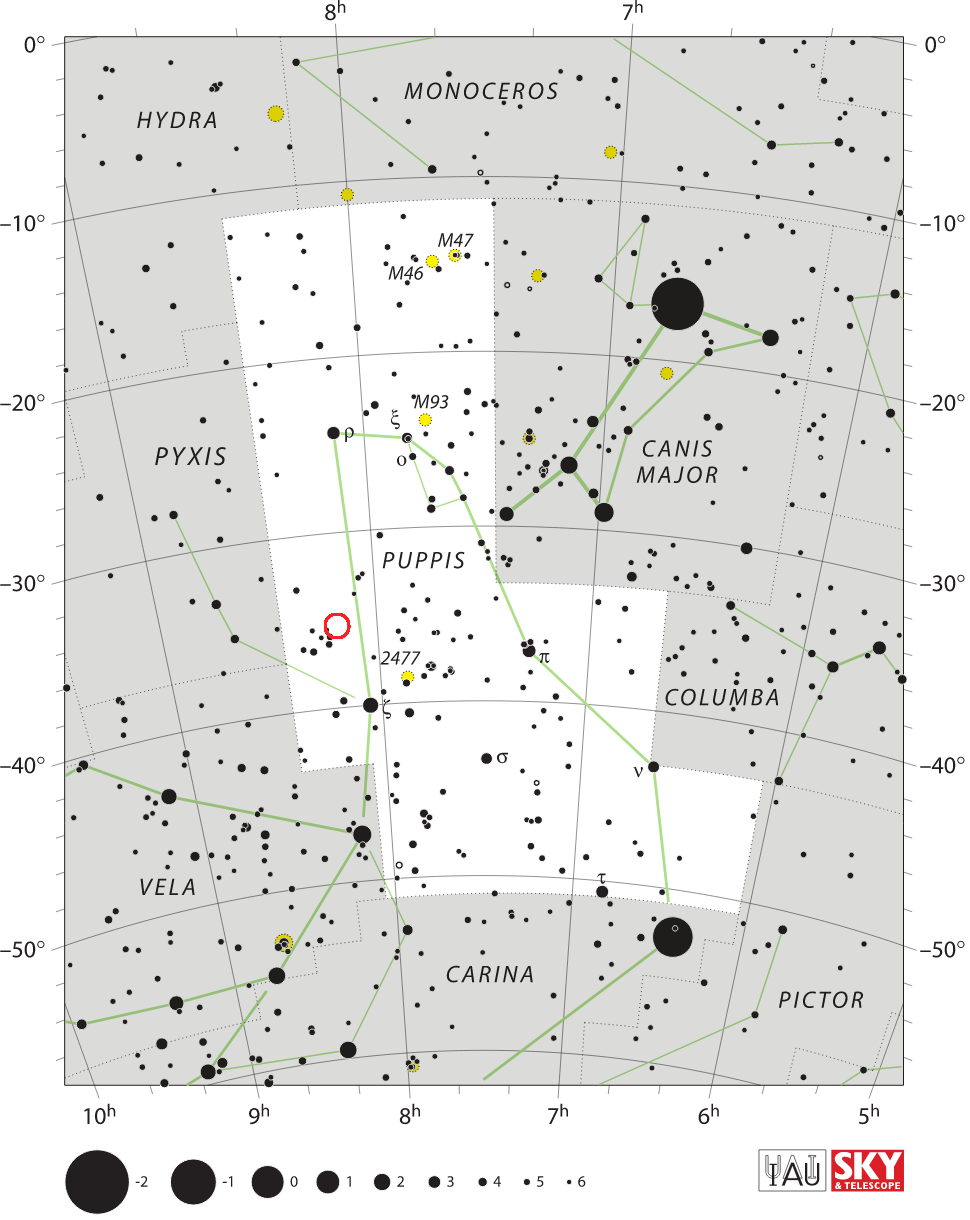
- Location of CP Puppis (circled in red)

Observation data Epoch J2000 Equinox J2000
- Constellation: Puppis
- Right ascension: 08^{h} 11^{m} 46.0635^{s}
- Declination: −35° 21′ 04.986″
- Apparent magnitude (V): 0.7 Max. 18 Min.

Characteristics
- Variable type: Nova

Astrometry
Radial velocity (R_{v})	+37 km/s
Proper motion (μ)	RA: −1.761±0.034 mas/yr Dec.: 2.432±0.037 mas/yr
Parallax (π)	1.2298±0.0211 mas
Distance	814+14 −15 pc

Other designations
- Nova Puppis 1942, AAVSO 0808-35, Gaia DR2 5544760551021856000, 2MASS J08114606-3521049; Socks Star

Database references
SIMBAD	data

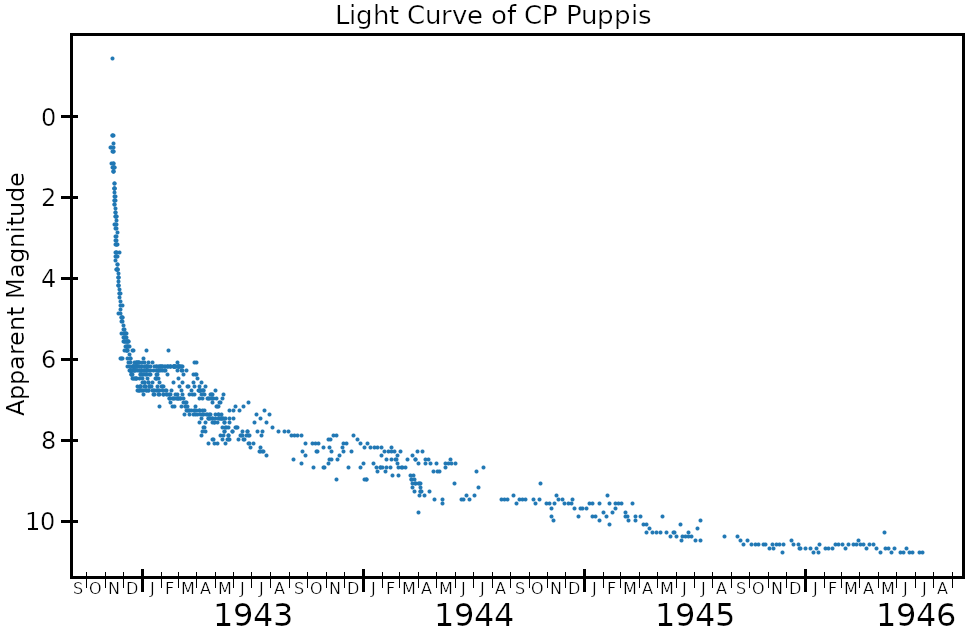
The light curve of CP Puppis from AAVSO data

CP Puppis (or Nova Puppis 1942) was a bright nova occurring in the constellation Puppis in 1942. The nova was discovered on 9 November 1942 by Bernhard Dawson at La Plata, Argentina, when it had an apparent visual magnitude of about 2. It was independently discovered at 18:00 on 10 November 1942 (UT) by a 19-year-old Japanese schoolgirl, Kuniko Sofue, who looked at the sky after patching her socks and noticed the nova. For this discovery, asteroid 7189 Kuniko was named in her honor.

From a 17th magnitude star, it reached an apparent visual magnitude of –0.2 then began a rapid decline. It had dropped by three magnitudes in an interval of 6.5 days, one of the sharpest declines ever noted for a nova. About 14 years later, the shell ejected by the nova event was detected, which allowed the distance to be computed. In 2000, this distance was revised to 3,720 light-years (1,140 parsecs) after correcting for probable errors. The Gaia spacecraft later measured the parallax of the star leading to an accurate distance of 815+15
−14 parsecs.

The nova outburst can be explained by a white dwarf that is accreting matter from a companion; most likely a low-mass main sequence star. This close binary system has an orbital period of 1.47 hours, which is one of the shortest periods of the known classical nova. Unusually, the white dwarf may have a magnetic field. Other properties of the system remain uncertain, although observations of X-ray emission from the system suggest that the white dwarf has a mass of more than 1.1 times the mass of the Sun.
