= Mercedes-Euklid =

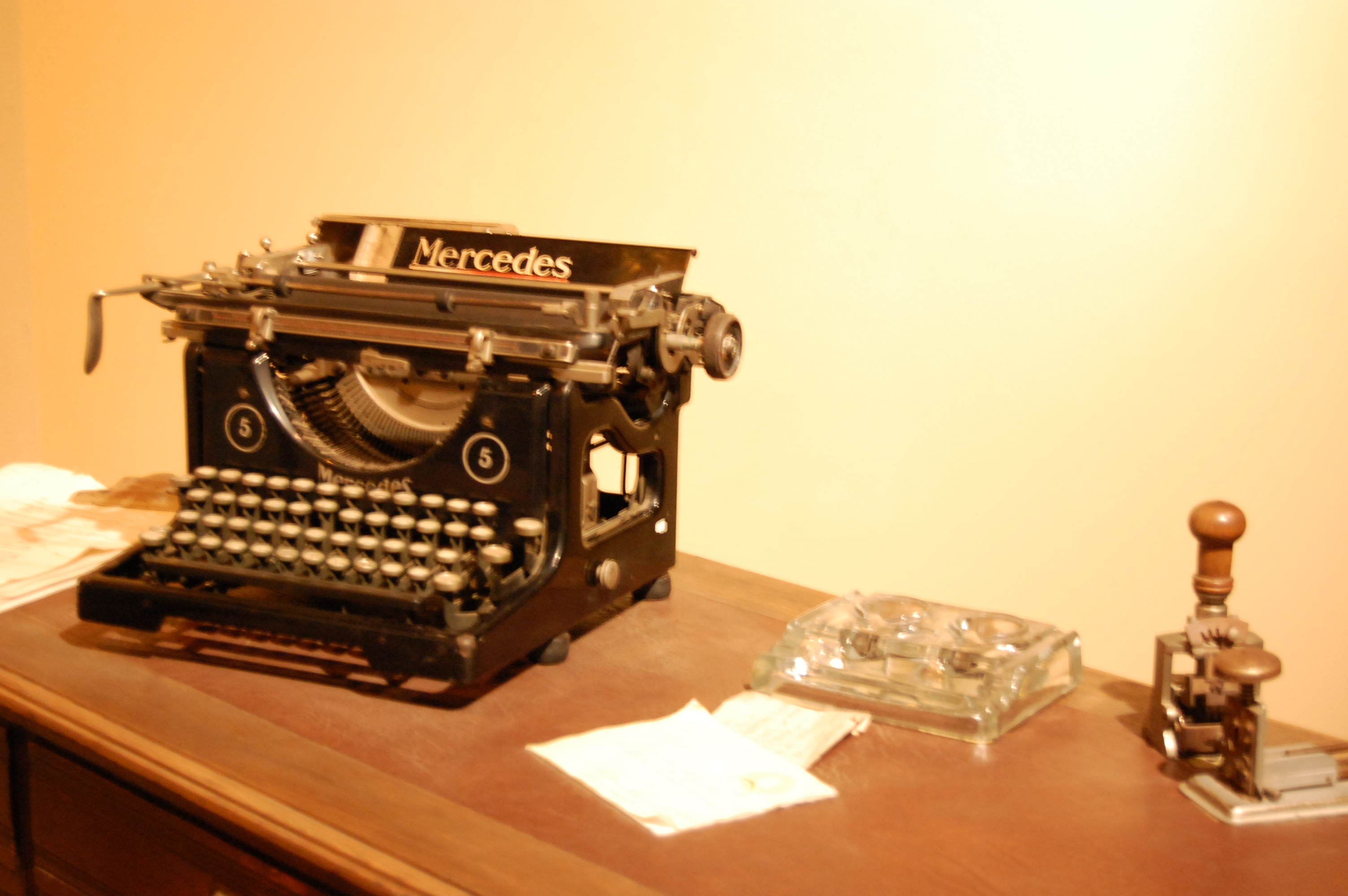
The Mercedes company is also known for producing typewriters

The Mercedes-Euklid is a German-invented calculator from the early twentieth century. It was built by Mercedes Büro-Maschinen Werke AG in Thuringia, Germany in 1905. The first manual mechanical models utilized a proportional-lever design invented by Christel Hamann in 1903.

An electric model, the Mercedes Euklid 30, was released circa 1945, though it may not have been the company's first electric calculator. In the 1960s, another electric model was released under the name "Cellatron."

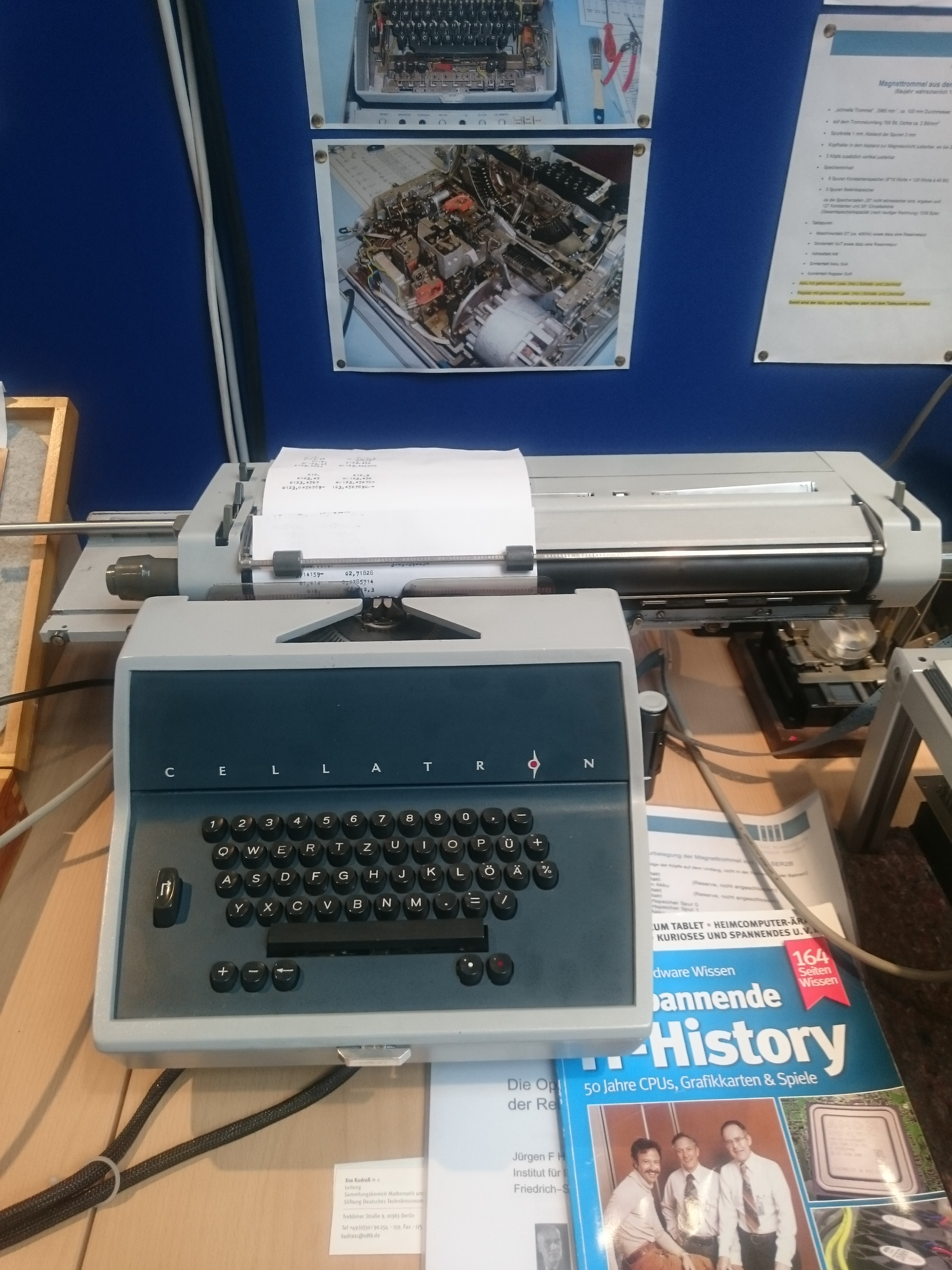
A Mercedes-Euklid Cellatron on Display at Berlin Vintage Computer Festival.
