= Ödön Beöthy =

Hungarian politician (1796–1854)

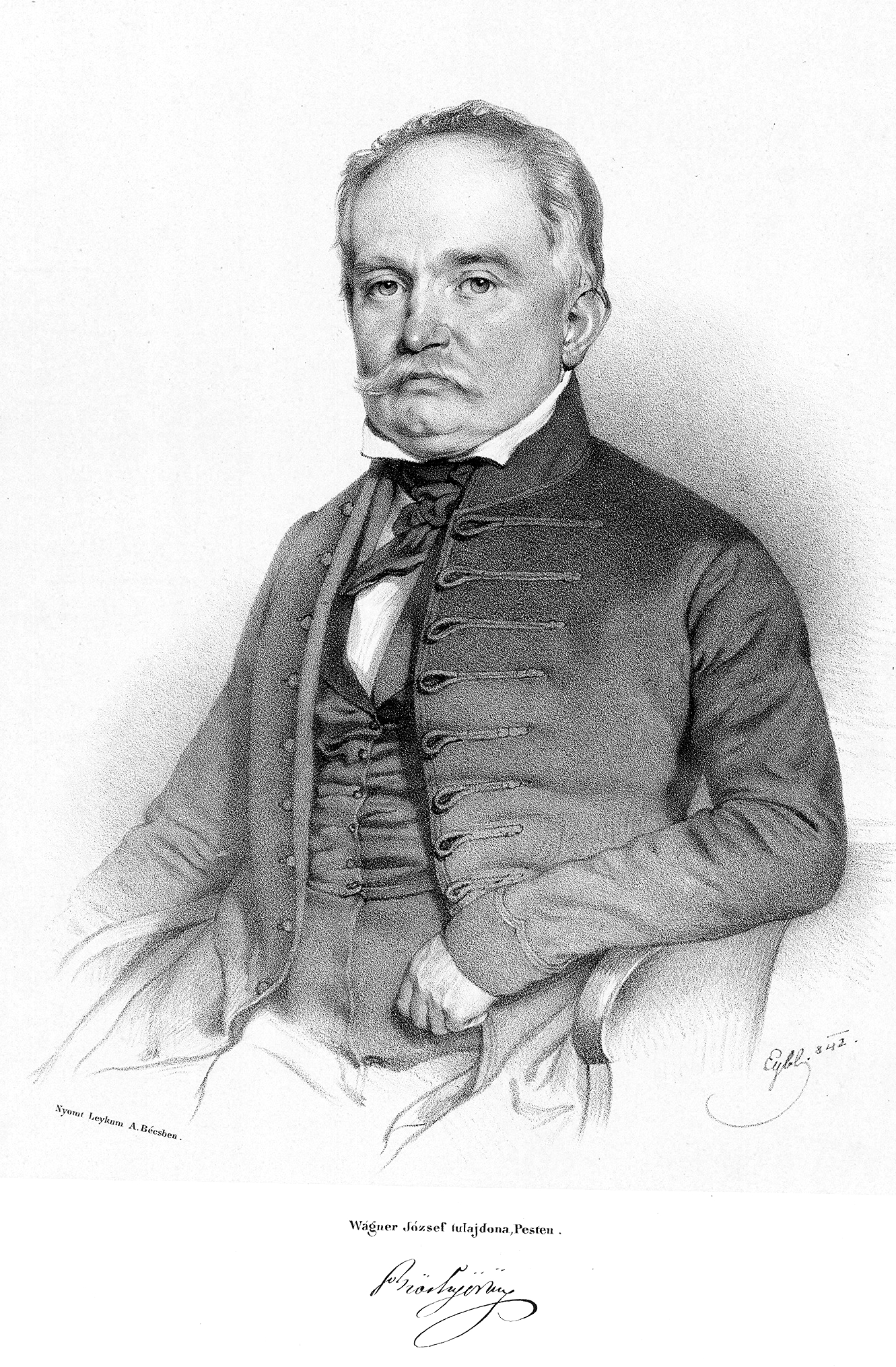
Ödön Beöthy

Ödön Beöthy (1796–1854), Hungarian deputy and orator, was born in Nagyvárad, Hungary (today Oradea, Romania), his father being a retired officer and deputy lord-lieutenant of Bihar County.

At the age of sixteen he served in the war against Napoleon, and was present at the great battle of Leipzig. Like so many others of his compatriots, he picked up Liberal ideas abroad. He was sent to parliament by his county in 1826 and again in 1830, but did not become generally known until the session of 1832–1836, when along with Ferenc Deák he, as a liberal Catholic, defended the Protestant point of view in the mixed marriages question. He was also an energetic advocate of freedom of speech. After parliament rose he carried his principles to their logical conclusion by marrying a Protestant lady and, being denied a blessing on the occasion by an indignant bishop, publicly declared that he could very well dispense with such blessings.

In 1841 he was elected deputy lord-lieutenant of his county to counteract the influence of the lord-lieutenant, Lajos Tisza, and powerfully promoted the popular cause by his eloquence and agitation. After 1843 the conservatives succeeded in excluding him both from parliament and from his official position in the county; but during the famous March Days (1848) he regained all his authority, becoming at the same time a commander of militia, a deputy and lord-lieutenant. At the first session of the Upper House (5 July 1848), he moved that it should be radically reformed, and during the war of Independence he energetically served the Hungarian government as a civil commissioner and lord justice.

Towards the end of the war he reappeared as a deputy at the Szeged diet, and on the flight of the government took refuge first with Richard Cobden in London and subsequently in Jersey, where he made the acquaintance of Victor Hugo. Thence he went to Hamburg, to meet his wife, and died there on 7 December 1854. Beöthy was a man of extraordinary ability and character, and an excellent debater. He also exercised as much influence socially over his contemporaries as politically, owing to his unfailing tact and pleasant wit.
