= Eijkman test =

Eijkman test, or differential coliform test, or confirmed Escherichia coli count, is a test used for the identification of coliform bacteria from warm-blooded animals based on the bacteria's ability to produce gas when grown in glucose media at 46°C (114.8°F).

The test to determine whether coliform bacteria come from warm-blooded animals. By means of this test it can be readily established if water has been polluted by human and animal defecation containing coli bacilli.

The test was introduced by Christiaan Eijkman (1858–1930) in his paper in 1904.
