= Odon (Lydia) =

Town of ancient Lydia

Coordinates: 38°43′23″N 28°30′26″E

Odon was a town of ancient Lydia, inhabited during Hellenistic and Roman times. Its name does not occur among ancient authors, but is inferred from epigraphic and other evidence.

Its site is located near Selekler, Borlu in Asiatic Turkey.
