= Johann Frederik Eijkman =

Dutch chemist (1851–1915)

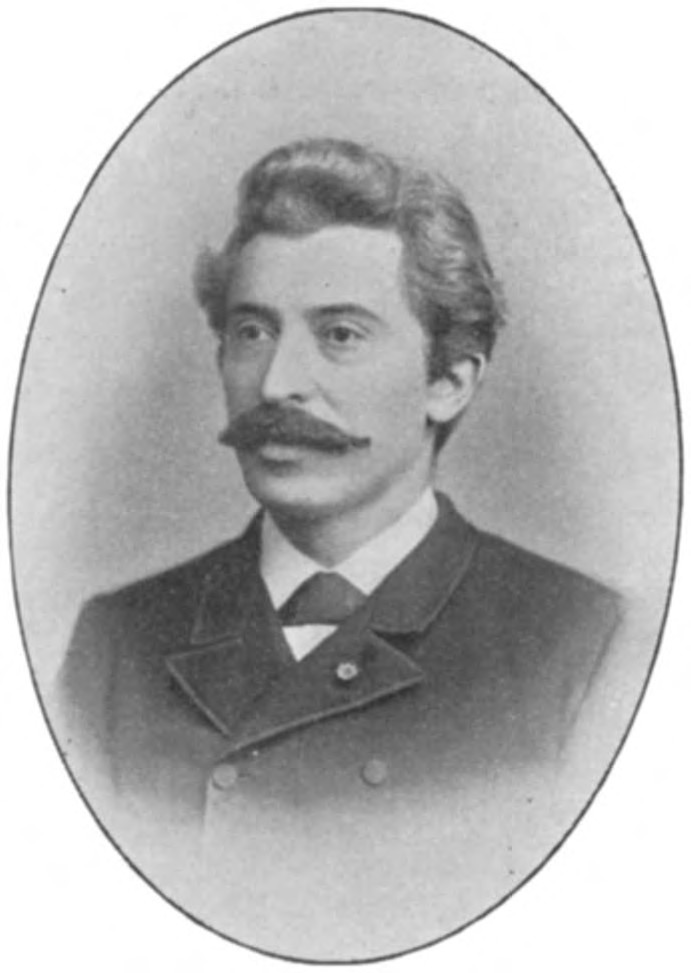
- Portrait published in 1898
- Born: 19 January 1851; Nijkerk
- Died: 7 January 1915 (aged 63); Groningen
- Scientific career
- Fields: Chemist
- Institutions: Tokyo, Groningen

Johan Fredrik Eykman or Johann Frederik Eijkman (19 January 1851 – 7 January 1915) was a Dutch chemist.

== Family background ==
He is one of the eight children of Christiaan Eijkman, the headmaster of a local school, and Johanna Alida Pool. His brother Christiaan Eijkman (1858–1930) was a physician and professor of physiology whose demonstration that beriberi is caused by poor diet led to the discovery of vitamins. Together with Sir Frederick Hopkins, his brother received the Nobel Prize for Physiology or Medicine.

== Life in Japan ==
He was hired during the Meiji period, a Japanese era which extended from September 1868 through July 1912. During his stay in Japan, he was the first to isolate shikimic acid in 1885 from the Japanese flower shikimi (シキミ, the Japanese star anise, Illicium anisatum).

== Works ==
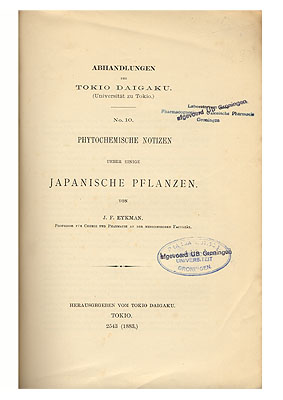
"Phytochemische Notizen ueber einige Japanische Pflanzen"

- 1883 : "Phytochemische Notizen ueber einige Japanische Pflanzen"
