= Christiaan Eijkman =

Dutch physician (1858–1930)

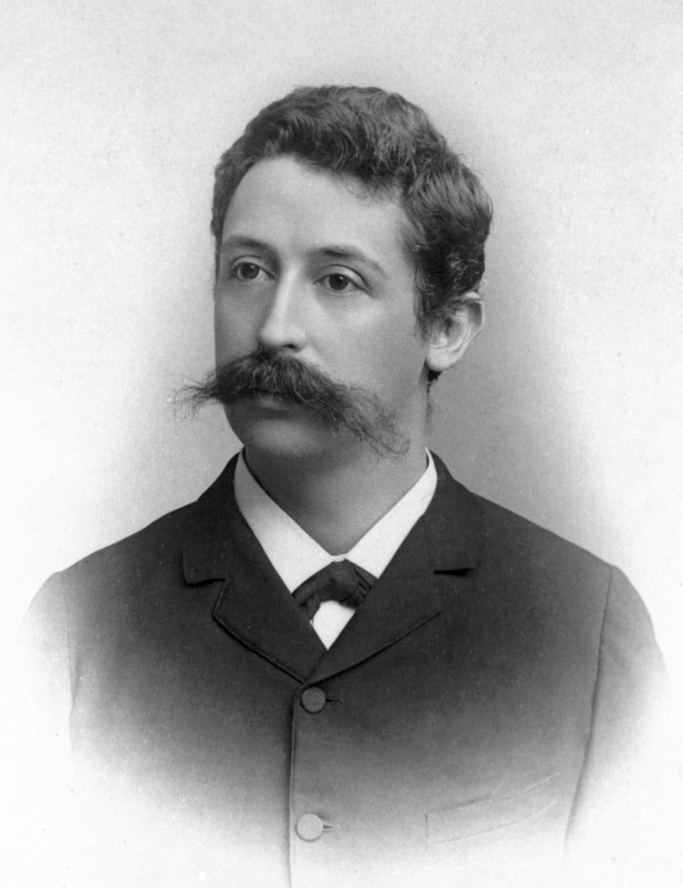
- Christiaan Eijkman
- Born: 11 August 1858; Nijkerk, Netherlands
- Died: 5 November 1930 (aged 72); Utrecht, Netherlands
- Known for: Beriberi, vitamins
- Awards: Nobel Prize for Physiology or Medicine (1929)
- Scientific career
- Fields: Physiology

Christiaan Eijkman (UK: /ˈeɪkmən, ˈaɪkmən/ AYK-mən, EYEK-mən, US: /-mɑːn/ -mahn, Dutch: [ˈkrɪstijaːn ˈɛikmɑn]; 11 August 1858 – 5 November 1930) was a Dutch physician and professor of physiology whose demonstration that beriberi is caused by poor diet led to the discovery of antineuritic vitamins (thiamine). Together with Sir Frederick Hopkins, he received the Nobel Prize for Physiology or Medicine in 1929 for the discovery of vitamins.

== Biography ==
=== Early life and education ===
Christiaan Eijkman was born on 11 August 1858, at Nijkerk, Netherlands, to Christiaan Eijkman, the headmaster of a local school, and Johanna Alida Pool. He was the youngest of seven children. His elder brother Johann Frederik Eijkman (1851–1915) became a physical chemist.

A year later, in 1859, the Eijkman family moved to Zaandam, where his father was appointed head of a newly founded school for advanced elementary education. It was here that Christiaan and his brothers received their early education. In 1875, after taking his preliminary examinations, Eijkman became a student at the Military Medical School of the University of Amsterdam, where he was trained as a medical officer for the Netherlands Indies Army, passing through all his examinations with honours.

From 1879 to 1881, he was an assistant of Thomas Place, Professor of Physiology, during which time he wrote his thesis Over Polarisatie in de Zenuwen (On Polarization of the Nerves), which earned him his doctoral degree with distinction on 13 July 1883.

=== Career ===
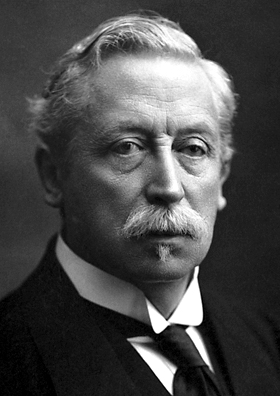
Christiaan Eijkman

In 1883, Eijkman left the Netherlands for The Dutch East Indies, where he was made medical officer of health, first in Semarang, then later at Tjilatjap, a small village on the south coast of Java, and at Padang Sidempoean in Northern Sumatra. It was at Tjilatjap that he caught malaria, which later so impaired his health that in 1885 he had to return to Europe on sick-leave.

For Eijkman this was to prove a lucky event, as it enabled him to work in E. Forster's laboratory in Amsterdam, and also in Robert Koch's bacteriological laboratory in Berlin; here he came into contact with Cornelis Adrianus Pekelharing and Tiberius Cornelis Winkler, who were visiting the German capital before their departure to the Indies. In this way medical officer Christiaan Eijkman was seconded as assistant to the Pekelharing-Winkler mission, together with his colleague M. B. Romeny. This mission had been sent out by the Dutch Government to conduct investigations into Beriberi, a disease which at that time was causing havoc in that region.

In 1887, Pekelharing and Winkler were recalled, but before their departure Pekelharing proposed to the Governor General that the laboratory which had been temporarily set up for the Commission in the Military Hospital in Batavia should be made permanent. This proposal was readily accepted, and the Sekolah Dokter Djawa (also called Dokter Djawa School, or Javanese Doctors' School) was set up as the first medical school in Indonesia. Christiaan Eijkman was appointed its first director and with it departed from the army service. Now he was able to devote himself entirely to science.

Eijkman was appointed Director of the "Geneeskundig Laboratorium" (Medical Laboratory) from 15 January 1888 to 4 March 1896, and during that time he made a number of his most important researches. These dealt first of all with the physiology of people living in tropical regions. He was able to demonstrate that a number of theories had no factual basis. Firstly he proved that in the blood of Europeans living in the tropics the number of red corpuscles, the specific gravity, the serum, and the water content, undergo no change, at least when the blood is not affected by disease which will ultimately lead to anaemia. Comparing the metabolism of the European with that of the native, he found that in the tropics as well in the temperate zone, this is entirely governed by the work carried out. Neither could he find any disparity in respiratory metabolism, perspiration, and temperature regulation. He published his research in the journal Geneeskundig Tijdschrift voor Nederlandsch-Indië (Medical Journal of the Dutch East Indies) in 1890. Thus Eijkman put an end to a number of speculations on the acclimatization of Europeans in the tropics which had hitherto necessitated the taking of various precautions.

==== Greatest work ====
Eijkman had been sent to the Dutch East Indies to study beriberi, a disease of the peripheral nerves, but his discovery of the cause was accidental. He noticed the symptoms of beriberi in some chickens used in his laboratory when their feed had been altered for a few months. During that time, chickens in the laboratory had been fed leftover rice from military rations, until a new cook refused to allow military rice to be fed to civilian animals. Rice was then purchased from another source, and the birds soon recovered. During the months that the chickens developed beriberi, the feed had been polished rice, and when the birds' diet was switched back to unpolished rice, the birds recovered in a few days. Eijkman surmised that polished rice lacked a dietary component found in unpolished rice, and that beriberi was caused by depriving the body of this component, which he called "the anti-beriberi factor". Subsequently, Eijkman was able to prove that the disease was not caused by blood contamination, respiratory metabolism, perspiration, or seasonal or temperature variation. He suspected the disease was caused by an unknown bacterium.

Eijkman was unable to continue his research due to ill health, but a study by his friend Adolphe Vorderman confirmed the link between polished rice and the disease. Eventually it was determined the missing compound that was causing beriberi was vitamin B_{1}, thiamine. Chemist Casimir Funk shortened the term "vital amine" to coin a new word, vitamin. For his contributions to the discovery of antineuritic vitamins, Eijkman won the 1929 Nobel Prize for Medicine, sharing the prize with Sir Frederick Hopkins. Funk, perhaps unfairly, was never given full credit for his work.

In addition to his work on beriberi, he occupied himself with other problems such as arrack fermentation, and wrote two textbooks for his students at the Java Medical School, one on physiology and the other on organic chemistry.

==== Later life and death ====
In 1898 he became successor to G. van Overbeek de Meyer, as Professor in Hygiene and Forensic Medicine at Utrecht. His inaugural speech was entitled Over Gezondheid en Ziekten in Tropische Gewesten (On health and diseases in tropical regions). At Utrecht, Eijkman turned to the study of bacteriology, and carried out his well-known fermentation test, by means of which it can be readily established if water has been polluted by human and animal defecation containing coli bacilli. Another research was into the rate of mortality of bacteria as a result of various external factors, whereby he was able to show that this process could not be represented by a logarithmic curve. This was followed by his investigation of the phenomenon that the rate of growth of bacteria on solid substratum often decreases, finally coming to a halt. Beyerinck's auxanographic method was applied on several occasions by Eijkman, as for example during the secretion of enzymes which break down casein or bring about haemolysis, whereby he could demonstrate the hydrolysis of fats under the influence of lipases.

Eijkman did not confine himself to the University. He also engaged himself in problems of water supply, housing, school hygiene, physical education. As a member of the Gezondheidsraad (Health Council) and the Gezondheidscommissie (Health Commission), he participated in the struggle against alcoholism and tuberculosis. He was the founder of the Vereeniging tot Bestrijding van de Tuberculose (Society for the struggle against tuberculosis ).

He died in Utrecht, on 5 November 1930, after a protracted illness.

==== Awards and legacy ====
In 1907, Eijkman was appointed Member of the Royal Netherlands Academy of Arts and Sciences, after having been Correspondent since 1895. The Dutch Government conferred upon him several orders of knighthood, whereas on the occasion of the 25th anniversary of his professorship a fund was established to enable the awarding of the Eijkman Medal. But the crown of all his work was the award of the Nobel Prize in 1929.

Eijkman was holder of the John Scott Medal, Philadelphia, and foreign associate of the National Academy of Sciences in Washington. He was also honorary fellow of the Royal Sanitary Institute in London.

Eijkman crater on the far side of the Moon was named after him in 1970. To honor his dedication, the government of Indonesia named his research center on pathology and bacteriology the Eijkman Institute for Molecular Biology.

=== Personal life ===
In 1883, before his departure to the Indies, Eijkman married Aaltje Wigeri van Edema, who died in 1886. In Batavia, Professor Eijkman married Bertha Julie Louise van der Kemp in 1888; a son, Pieter Hendrik, who became a physician, was born in 1890.

== See also ==
- Eijkman test
