= Ödön Mihalovich =

Hungarian composer and music educator

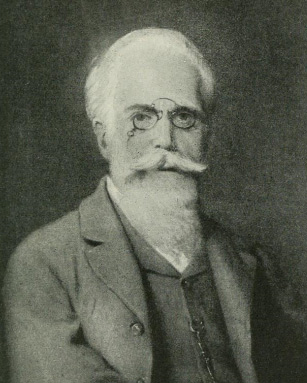

Ödön (Edmund) Péter József de Mihalovich (September 13, 1842 in Fericsánci, Slavonia – April 22, 1929 in Budapest) was a Hungarian composer and music educator.

Mihalovich first studied in Pest with Mihály Mosonyi. In 1865, he moved to Leipzig, studying there with Moritz Hauptmann, and, in 1866, he completed his studies in Munich with Peter Cornelius. Mihalovich then moved back to Pest; in 1872, he became president of the city's Wagner Society and, in 1887, he followed Franz Liszt as the head of the Budapest Academy of Music, a position he held until 1919.

He was also, according to a contemporary source a pupil of Hans von Bülow.

While Mihalovich's works are thoroughly Wagnerian in style, he was supportive of Hungarian nationalism and encouraged composers such as Béla Bartók and Zoltán Kodály.

A symphony in D minor was published by Breitkopf & Härtel in 1883.

== Works ==
Note:this list is incomplete.

Operas

- Hagbart und Signe (1867-1881), prémieres: Dresden, 1882 by Franz Wüllner; Budapest, 1886 by Sándor Erkel.
- Wieland der Schmied (1876–78, unperformed)
- Eliane (1885–87), prémieres: Budapest, 1908 by István Kerner; Vienna 1909 by Karl Gille.
- Toldi (The Knight Toldi) (1888-1891), prémiere: Budapest, 1893 by Anton Resnicek.
- Toldi's Love (Toldi szerelme - the second version of Toldi with new 2nd finale and 3rd act), prémiere: Budapest, 1895 by Arthur Nikisch.

Fragments and planned operas:

- König Fjalar (1877-1884, 3 versions, destroyed)
- Faust (?, only two scenes are written)
- Tihanyi visszhang (The Echo of Tihany /Hungarian fairy-tale/, after 1895, only two scenes are written.)

Symphonies

- No. 1 in D minor (1879), prémiere: Budapest,1885.
- No. 2 in B minor (1892), prémiere: Budapest, 1893.
- No. 3 in A minor, 'Patetikus'(sic) (In memoriam Elisabeth, Empress of Austria and Queen consort of Hungary, 1898-1901), prémiere: Budapest, 1901.
- No. 4 in C minor (1902), prémiere: Budapest, 1903.

Symphonic Ballads

- The Ghost ship (Rémhajó/Der Geisterschiff), prémiere: Budapest, 1871; Cassel, 1872.
- The Mermaid (Sellő/Die Nixe), prémiere: Budapest, 1875; Wiesbaden, 1878.
- Hero and Leander (Heró és Leander/ Hero und Leander), prémiere: Budapest, 1879.
- Funeral music for Ferenc Deák (Gyászhangok nagyzenekarra/ Trauerklänge), prémiere: Budapest, 1876.
- La Ronde du Sabbat (Boszorkányszombat), prémiere: Budapest, 1879.
- Faust Phantasy (Faust-ábránd / Eine Faust-Phantasie), prémiere: Leipzig, 1883; Budapest 1896.
- Pan's death (Pán halála / Pan's Tod), prémiere: Budapest, 1898; Berlin, 1902.

Other works

- Choral works
- Chamber music
