= Odon Godart =

Belgian astronomer and meteorologist (1913–1996)

Odon Hector Ghislain Godart
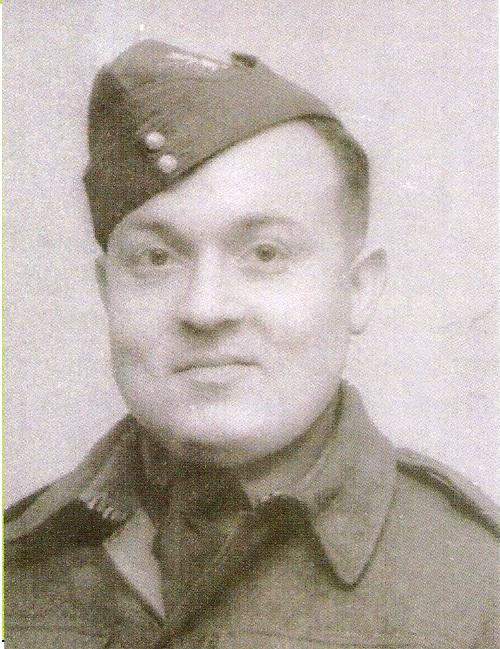
- Born: August 21, 1913; Farciennes, Wallonia, Belgium
- Died: April 18, 1996 (aged 82); Farciennes, Wallonia, Belgium
- Education: University of Louvain

Odon Godart (August 21, 1913 – April 18, 1996) was a Belgian astronomer and meteorologist.

Trained in mathematics and astronomy before World War II, he joined the Allies after Belgian surrender. He specialized in meteorology during the war and participated in the Normandy landings. He became director of Meteorological Services and reorganized the Belgian air force. He came back as a professor of astronomy in 1959. He has 180 published articles, seminars, courses, and lectures in meteorology, astronomy, and other scientific disciplines.

== Early life and education ==
Odon Godart was born in Farciennes, Wallonia, Belgium, on August 21, 1913.

After his first studies in Greco-Latin humanities at the Jesuit College in Charleroi, he was granted a graduate degree in Mathematical Sciences by the Catholic University of Louvain in 1935.

== Career ==
=== Early ===
He later became the assistant of the priest and astrophysicist Monsignor Georges Lemaître, a professor who specialized in the origin of the Big Bang Theory of the expanding universe.

In 1938, after this stage, he moved to The United States of America to do research on cosmic rays at the Harvard Observatory and MIT. During one of his visits to Hollywood, he met Paulette Goddard, the actress of Modern Times along with Charlie Chaplin, who informed him of the beginning of the war in Europe.

=== World War II ===
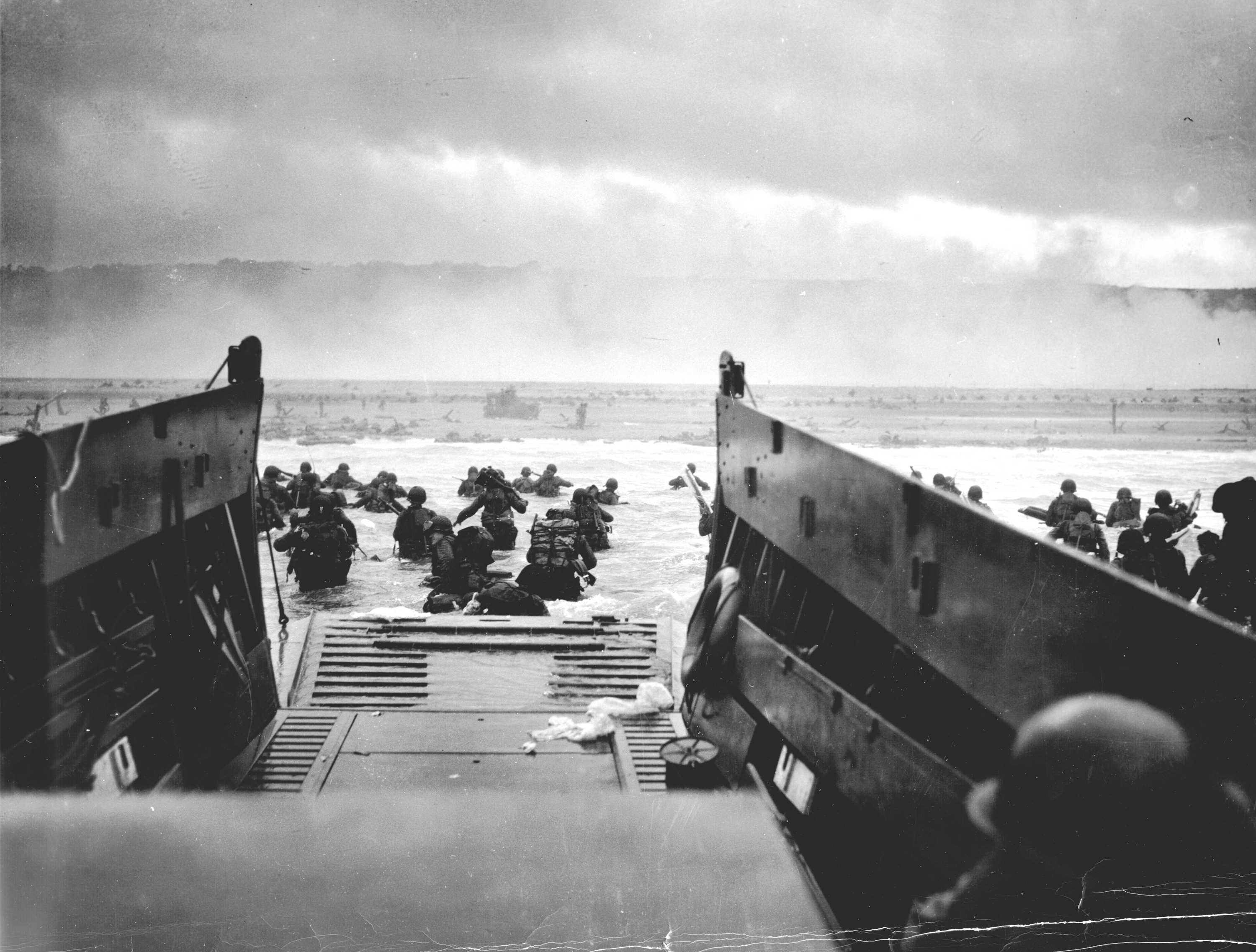
Landing on Omaha Beach in the morning of June 6, 1944

Odon Godart decided to return to Europe on a fishing boat. Later, he enlisted in the Canadian Army and, finally, he went to England to work for the meteorological service of the British Army, taking soundings of the North Sea.

In 1943 he participated in the bombing raids over Germany where he was seriously injured. During his three months in the hospital, he improved his meteorological studies.

He drafted the manuscript of On the Introduction and Use of Isobaric Coordinates, How to coordinate Meteorology and its Isobaric Consequences. The idea was not well received by his superior R. C. Sutcliffe, but its value was finally recognized. This concept allows the use of pressure for the analysis instead of altitude, which simplified the equations of the atmospheric behavior, and later on, it will be used in weather prediction.

The arrangements for the Normandy landing were on track, but a date had yet to be chosen. General Eisenhower requested that the weather be predicted two weeks in advance, a task which was virtually impossible to do in those days by the three meteorology groups, Royal Navy, Met Office and USAAF working independently with James Stagg, Chief weather forecaster to assist Eisenhower on the planning of Operation Overlord.

Originally D-day was going to be on June 5, 1944, but due to inclement weather, it was suggested to change to the next day. At 4:30, in the morning of June 4, the forecast provided by the three meteorologist groups contributed significantly to Eisenhower's decision to move the mission on June 6.

=== After the war ===
Odon Godart arrived at Normandy and was responsible for the reorganization of the meteorological service of the Belgian Air Force where he was appointed director.

In 1950, now settled in Belgium, he married and had 5 children.

In 1959 he worked as a professor at the University of Louvain, and taught astronomy and published several articles in Lemaître about astronomy and cosmology, among other topics.

He was President of the Royal Belgian Society of Astronomy, Meteorology and Physics of the Globe.

Odon Godart died in his hometown, Farciennes, Wallonia, on April 18, 1996.

== Astronomy ==
Map of the cosmic background radiation obtained with the satellite WMAP

In 1965 Odon Godart announced the discovery of cosmic background radiation by Arno Penzias and Robert Wilson to his former colleague Georges Lemaître, who was very ill by then. This missing echo of the formation of the world, as Lemaître poetically called it, confirmed the cosmological scenario of the Big Bang, of which Lemaître was one of the first discoverers between 1920 and 1930.

The asteroid (7043) Godart discovered in 1934 was named in his honor.

== Publications ==
- Les prévisions météorologiques britanniques pendant la guerre 1940–1945', Ciel et Terre, vol. 102, 1986.
- Histoire de la météorologie à l'aviation belge, Musée de l'Air, Cinquantenaire, Bruselas, 1990.
