= Nikolai Alekhin =

Soviet Union rocket designer

Nikolai Pavlovich Alekhin (Russian: Николай Павлович Алёхин; 1913–1964) was a Soviet Union rocket designer. The lunar crater Alekhin is named in his honour.
