= Fizeau (crater) =

Lunar impact crater

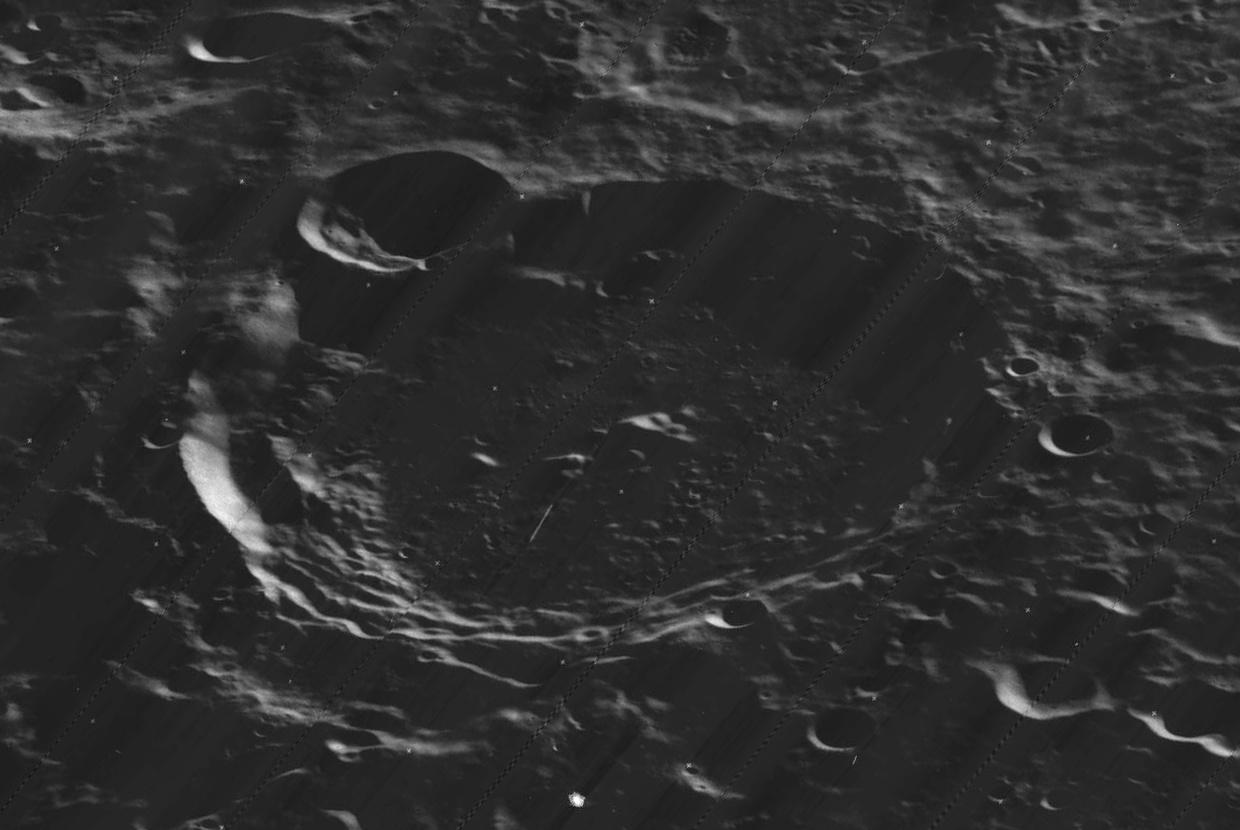
- Oblique Lunar Orbiter 5 image
- Coordinates: 58.6°S 133.9°W
- Diameter: 107.08 km (66.54 mi)
- Depth: Unknown
- Colongitude: 137° at sunrise
- Formation: Upper Imbrian
- Eponym: Hippolyte Fizeau

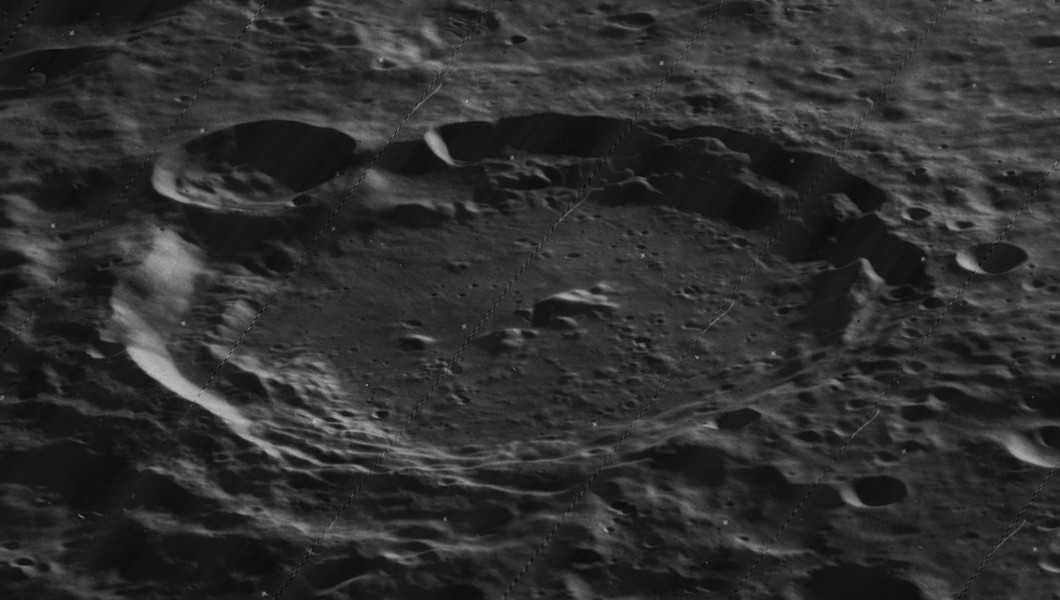
Another oblique Lunar Orbiter 5 image, facing west

Fizeau is a prominent lunar impact crater that is located on the far side of the Moon, in the southern hemisphere. Nearby craters of note include Minkowski to the west-northwest, and Eijkman to the southwest. Fizeau lies within the enormous South Pole-Aitken Basin.

On the lunar geologic timescale, Fizeau dates to the Upper Imbrian period. The inner wall of the crater rim is multiply terraced in the northern half, while the southern rim has a shear inner surface leading down to slumped deposits on the crater floor. Fizeau Q is a small but prominent crater lying across the southwest rim, with an inner surface that forms terraced steps covering most of the interior. There are also smaller craterlets on the rim to the northeast and west-southwest.

The interior of Fizeau is relatively flat beyond the terraces, with only a few low rises in the northwest section of the crater and a central peak near the midpoint. The spectra of this peak fits a gabbroic norite mineralogy, which was excavated from a depth of 11.1 to 18.0 km. Only a few tiny craterlets are located on the floor.

This formation is named after French physicist Hippolyte Fizeau (1819-1896). Its designation was formally adopted by the International Astronomical Union in 1970.

== Satellite craters ==
By convention these features are identified on lunar maps by placing the letter on the side of the crater midpoint that is closest to Fizeau.

| Fizeau | Latitude | Longitude | Diameter |
|---|---|---|---|
| C | 56.1° S | 128.5° W | 22 km |
| F | 58.2° S | 124.5° W | 19 km |
| G | 59.2° S | 124.5° W | 54 km |
| Q | 59.8° S | 136.3° W | 28 km |
| S | 58.7° S | 139.9° W | 62 km |
