= Crommelin (lunar crater) =

Lunar impact crater

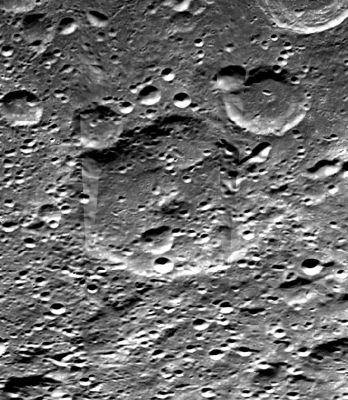
- Clementine mosaic
- Coordinates: 68.1°S 146.9°W
- Diameter: 93.48 km (58.09 mi)
- Depth: Unknown
- Colongitude: 152° at sunrise
- Formation: Pre-Nectarian
- Eponym: Andrew C. D. Crommelin

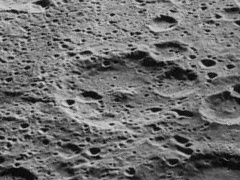
Oblique Lunar Orbiter 5 image, facing west

Crommelin is an ancient lunar impact crater that is located in the vicinity of the south pole of the Moon, on the far side. It lies within the South Pole-Aitken basin, to the north of the large crater Zeeman, and to the east-northeast of Numerov. To the north of Crommelin is Lemaître.

On the lunar geologic timescale, Crommelin dates to the Pre-Nectarian period. This formation has been almost completely degraded by subsequent impacts, leaving little more than a crater-riddled depression in the surface. There is an equally worn crater lying across the northern rim, and Crommelin X is attached to the outward-bulging northwest perimeter.

The largest of the craterlets within the interior form a pair near the southern rim. There is a slight central peak, consisting of little more than a low rise in the surface. The spectra of the central peak fits an olivine-bearing gabbroic norite mineralogy, which was excavated from a depth of 3.5 to 9.4 km.

This crater is named after British astronomer Andrew C. D. Crommelin (1865–1939), an expert on comets (1865-1939). Its designation was formally adopted by the International Astronomical Union in 1970.

== Satellite craters ==
By convention these features are identified on Lunar maps by placing the letter on the side of the crater midpoint that is closest to Crommelin.

Crommelin	Latitude	Longitude	Diameter
C	66.4° S	144.8° W	44 km
W	66.0° S	152.7° W	24 km
X	66.3° S	150.0° W	26 km
