= 2014–15 Russian Cup =

Tournament details
- Country: Russia

Final positions
- Champions: Lokomotiv Moscow (6th title)
- Runners-up: Kuban Krasnodar

Tournament statistics
- Matches played: 100
- Goals scored: 273 (2.73 per match)
- Top goal scorer(s): Mbark Boussoufa; Ivelin Popov (3 goals each)

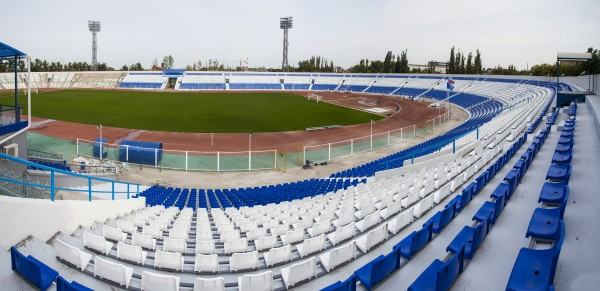

The 2014–15 Russian Cup, known as the 2014–15 Pirelli–Russian Football Cup for sponsorship reasons, was the 23rd season of the Russian football knockout tournament since the dissolution of Soviet Union.

The competition started on 8 July 2014. The cup champion won a spot in the 2015–16 UEFA Europa League group stage.

The final match was played on 21 May 2015 at the Central Stadium in Astrakhan.

== First round ==
The matches were played between 8 July and 12 August 2014.

8 July 2014	Dynamo Kostroma (IV)	2–3 (a.e.t.)	Torpedo Vladimir (III)	Kostroma
	Roman Kurenkov 70'; Ilya Shitov 79'		Zimarev 29' (pen.), 96'; Vtyurin 55'	Stadium: Dinamo Stadium; Attendance: 500; Referee: Artem Polyakov

8 July 2014	Domodedovo (III)	0–0 (a.e.t.) (3–2 p)	Spartak Kostroma (III)	Domodedovo
				Stadium: Avangard Stadium; Attendance: 600; Referee: Maksim Nasedin
	Penalties
	Penalty missed Penalty scored		Penalty scored Penalty missed

8 July 2014	Zvezda St. Petersburg (IV)	0–1 (a.e.t.)	Volga Tver (III)	Saint Petersburg
			Aleksandr Kabanov 95' (pen.)	Stadium: New Zenit Stadium; Attendance: 800; Referee: Vasily Tikhonov (Pskov)

8 July 2014	Solaris Moscow (III)	0–1	Vybor-Kurbatovo (III)	Moscow
			Dyogtev 90+2'	Stadium: Otkrytie Arena; Attendance: 500; Referee: Ivan Sidenkov (Saint Petersburg)

8 July 2014	Tambov (III)	2–2 (a.e.t.) (4–1 p)	Saturn Ramenskoye (III)	Tambov
	Viktor Svistunov 10'; Tynyany 76' (pen.)		Medvedev 84', 86'	Stadium: Central Stadium; Attendance: 2,000; Referee: Anton Frolov
	Penalties
	Mikhalyov (penalty scored); Spitsyn (penalty scored); Aleksandr Yegurnev (penalty scored); Vasilyev (penalty scored)		Shestakov (penalty scored); Kurbanov (penalty missed); Lapin (penalty missed)

8 July 2014	Oryol (III)	0–2	Kolomna (III)	Oryol
			Anisimov 36'; Bobylev 66'	Stadium: Central Stadium; Attendance: 1,500; Referee: Vladimir Pevchev

14 July 2014	Metallurg-Kuzbass (III)	2–1 (a.e.t.)	Dynamo Barnaul (III)	Novokuznetsk
	Samoylov 5' (pen.); Maksim Yeruslanov 117'		Krug 42'	Stadium: Metallurg Stadium; Attendance: 1,100; Referee: Mikhail Kazantsev

14 July 2014	Baikal Irkutsk (III)	4–2	Sibir-2 Novosibirsk (III)	Irkutsk
	Kirillov 2', 85'; Aleksei Nekrasov 11', 20'		Sergeyev 17'; Artyom Goncharov 50'	Stadium: Stadion Lokomotiv; Attendance: 1500; Referee: Kirill Molchanov

14 July 2014	Smena Komsomolsk-na-Amure (III)	0–0 (a.e.t.) (5–4 p)	DSI Komsomolsk-na-Amure (IV)	Komsomolsk-on-Amur
11:00				Stadium: Avangard stadium Attendance: 2,000; Referee: Sergey Sergeyev
	Penalties
	Penalty scored		(penalty scored) (penalty scored) (penalty scored) (penalty scored); Klimeyev (penalty missed)

1 August 2014	Alania Vladikavkaz (III)	1–2	Mashuk-KMV (III)	Vladikavkaz
17:00	Ruslan Margiyev 17'		Sadirov 35'; Abidinov 37'	Stadium: Republican Spartak Stadium; Attendance: 1500; Referee: Vasili Miroshnichenko

1 August 2014	Biolog (III)	1–2	Druzhba Maykop (III)	Novokubansk
17:00	Artyom Nozdrunov 57'		Denis Pavlov 4'; Aleksandr Kogoniya 33'	Stadium: Progress Stadium; Attendance: 300; Referee: Dmitry Streltsov

1 August 2014	Taganrog (III)	4–1	Afips (III)	Taganrog
17:00	Chernyshev 11', 39'; Petrov 21'; Denis Rodionov 24'		Burmakov 90'	Stadium: Torpedo; Attendance: 700; Referee: Dmitri Nedvizhay

1 August 2014	Rotor Volgograd (III)	1–2	Astrakhan (III)	Volzhsky
17:00	Maksim Tazetdinov 48'		Sergei Sechin 63'; Mamedov 68'	Stadium: Stadion im. F.G. Loginova; Attendance: 1100; Referee: Maksim Shutov

1 August 2014	Vityaz Krymsk (III)	2–3	Chernomorets Novorossiysk (III)	Krymsk
17:00	Balkarov 55' (pen.); Kalashnikov 73'		Lusikyan 38'; Sinyavskiy 47'; Boyarintsev 53'	Stadium: Gigant Stadium; Attendance: 1000; Referee: Yunus Koshko

12 August 2014	TSK Simferopol (III)	0–2	SKChF Sevastopol (III)	Simferopol
17:00			Kobenko 31' (pen.); Yevgeni Ponomaryov 63'	Stadium: RSC Lokomotiv; Attendance: 1600; Referee: Aleksandr Oryol

12 August 2014	Zhemchuzhyna Yalta (III)	0–2	Sochi (III)	Yalta
17:00			Aleksandr Ilyashenko 9'; Arkadi Kalaydzhyan 63'	Stadium: Avanhard Stadion; Attendance: 1000; Referee: Vasili Miroshnichenko

== Second round ==
The matches were played between 15 July and 16 August 2014.

15 July 2014	Chita (III)	2–0	Belogorsk (IV)	Chita
11:30	Viktor Navrodskiy 23'; Fatikhov 50'			Stadium: Yunost' Stadium; Attendance: 1500; Referee: Igor Baranov

26 July 2014	Irtysh Omsk (III)	0–2	Metallurg-Kuzbass (III)	Omsk
			Ageev 37'; Kiselev 40' (pen.)	Stadium: Red Star Stadium; Attendance: 1100; Referee: Vitaly Chumeyko

26 July 2014	Raspadskaya Mezhdurechensk (IV)	1–2 (a.e.t.)	Baikal Irkutsk (III)	Mezhdurechensk
	Konstantinov 57' (pen.)		Galin 53' (pen.); Zemlyanskiy 98' (pen.)	Stadium: Stadion Tomusinets; Attendance: 800; Referee: Anatoliy Sharovatov

26 July 2014	Smena Komsomolsk-na-Amure (III)	3–1	Yakutiya Yakutsk (III)	Komsomolsk-on-Amur
	Ibragim Bazayev 74'; Buznyakov 84'; Alborov 90' (pen.)		Aleksei Kiselyov 78' (pen.)	Stadium: Avangard Stadium; Attendance: 2500; Referee: Konstantin Molchanov

28 July 2014	Zenit-Izhevsk Izhevsk (III)	0–1	KAMAZ Naberezhnye Chelny (III)	Izhevsk
			Ruslan Shaydullin 68'	Stadium: Kupol Stadium; Attendance: 1500; Referee: Andrei Khudorozhkov

28 July 2014	Dynamo Kirov (III)	4–0	Spartak Yoshkar-Ola (III)	Novovyatsk
	Dmitri Khalyavin 1'; Kirill Lomov 36'; Yuri Konev (?)			Stadium: Russia Stadium; Attendance: 800; Referee: Valeri Romanov

28 July 2014	Shakhtyor-Volga-Olimpiets (IV)	2–2 (a.e.t.) (3–5 p)	Volga Ulyanovsk (III)	Peshelan
	Borisov 29'; Belyakov 101'		Yevgeni Zhikharev 65'; Safin 105' (pen.)	Stadium: Shakhtyor Stadium; Attendance: 1000; Referee: Mikhail Nebogatikov

28 July 2014	Syzran-2003 (III)	1–0	Lada-Togliatti (III)	Syzran
	Churavtsev 23'			Stadium: Kristall Stadium; Attendance: 2000; Referee: Dmitry Sukhov

28 July 2014	Nosta Novotroitsk (III)	2–0	Chelyabinsk (III)	Novotroitsk
	Sorokin 5'; Karpukhin 53'			Stadium: Metallurg Stadium; Attendance: 700; Referee: Aleksei Shishkin

29 July 2014	Tekstilshchik Ivanovo (III)	2–0	Domodedovo (III)	Ivanovo
	Krolevets 55'; Bulia 77'			Stadium: Tekstilshchik Stadium; Attendance: 4200; Referee: Ilya Bugrov

29 July 2014	Kaluga (III)	2–1	Dolgoprudny (III)	Kaluga
	Aleksei Sabanov 45' (pen.), 69' (pen.)		Shestakov 36'	Stadium: Arena Annenki; Attendance: 800; Referee: Yevgeni Gubin

29 July 2014	Torpedo Vladimir (III)	0–3	Metallurg Vyksa (III)	Vladimir
			Oleg Bykov 29', 81'; Imrekov 34'	Stadium: Torpedo Stadium; Attendance: 800; Referee: Eduard Sokolov

29 July 2014	Zvezda Ryazan (III)	2–1	Khimki (III)	Ryazan
	Avakyan 17'; Zhdankin 66'		Salamatov 90'	Stadium: Stadion Spartak; Attendance: 1200; Referee: Yevgeni Kukulyak

29 July 2014	Volga Tver (III)	0–3 (a.e.t.)	Vityaz Podolsk (III)	Tver
	Soltanov 43'; Averyanov 113'; Khabalov 117'		Boyarov 40'	Stadium: Stadion Khimik; Attendance: 1000; Referee: Pyotr Miroshnichenko

29 July 2014	Pskov-747 (III)	1–2 (a.e.t.)	Podolye (III)	Pskov
	Antipov 19'		Aleksandr Selivanov 58'; Yevgeni Osokin 118'	Stadium: Sportivnyj Kompleks 747; Attendance: 1000; Referee: Ivan Abrosimov

29 July 2014	Vybor-Kurbatovo (III)	1–2	Fakel Voronezh (III)	Voronezh
	Smirnov 66'		Alshin 17'; Sokolov 62'	Stadium: Tsentralnyi Profsoyuz Stadion; Attendance: 8000; Referee: Yevgeni Gerasimenko

29 July 2014	Lokomotiv Liski (III)	4–0	Znamya Truda (III)	Liski
	Yakovlev 6'; Latynin 35'; Puzanov 57' (pen.); Gruznov 77'			Stadium: Stadion Lokomotiv; Attendance: 1000; Referee: Maksim Matyunin

29 July 2014	Zenit Penza (III)	0–2	Tambov (III)	Penza
			Chernyshov 59'; Tynyany 64'	Stadium: Stadium 1st May; Attendance: 1000; Referee: Maksim Nasedin

29 July 2014	Strogino Moscow (III)	0–2	Metallurg Lipetsk (III)	Moscow
			Poyarkov 17'; Akopyan 90+3'	Stadium: Yantar Stadium; Attendance: 400; Referee: Stanislav Isaev

29 July 2014	Kolomna (III)	2–1	Avangard Kursk (III)	Kolomna
	Vikulov 78'; Belevitin 87'		Pugachyov 76'	Stadium: Avangard Stadium; Attendance: 1000; Referee: Danil Dresvyannikov

29 July 2014	Dynamo Bryansk (III)	3–1	Dnepr Smolensk (III)	Bryansk
	Nikita Bondarev 44' (pen.); Rychenkov 56'; Dmitrenko 76'		Prudnikov 60'	Stadium: Dynamo Stadium; Attendance: 2000; Referee: Denis Zabotin

1 August 2014	Spartak Nalchik (III)	1–0	Angusht Nazran (III)	Nalchik
17:30	Bazhev 69' (pen.)			Stadium: Spartak Stadium; Attendance: 200; Referee: Aleksandr Orel

8 August 2014	Druzhba Maykop (III)	3–0	Dynamo GTS Stavropol (III)	Maykop
	Akhmedkhanov 21', 49', 87'			Stadium: Stadium Yunost; Attendance: 500; Referee: Maksim Shutov

8 August 2014	Astrakhan (III)	2–1	Mashuk-KMV (III)	Astrakhan
	Khasanov 12'; Sergei Sechin 73' (pen.)		Ibragimov 26'	Stadium: Sudostroitel Stadium; Attendance: 500; Referee: Sergey Baranov

8 August 2014	MITOS (III)	3–4	Taganrog (III)	Novocherkassk
	Denis Rodionov 2' (o.g.); Rudenko 18'; Khinchagov 56'		Sugak 13', 21', 49'; Dmitri Belokolosov 45'	Stadium: Ermak Stadium; Attendance: 500; Referee: Vasiliy Miroshnichenko

16 August 2014	Sochi (III)	0–0 (a.e.t.) (5–6 p)	SKChF Sevastopol (III)	Sochi
				Stadium: Central Stadium; Attendance: 300; Referee: Aleksandr Gurenko
	Penalties
	Korolyov (penalty scored); Kalaydzhyan (penalty scored); Golban (penalty scored); Kokoskeriya (penalty missed); Semyonov (penalty scored); Soslan Revazov (penalty scored); Cholakyan (penalty missed)		Anton Vinnikov (penalty scored); Nechayev (penalty scored); Zhirny (penalty missed); Ryabokon (penalty scored); Semyonov (penalty scored); Shevchenko (penalty scored); Krichmar (penalty scored)

16 August 2014	Chernomorets Novorossiysk (III)	2–1	Torpedo Armavir (III)	Novorossiysk
	Boyarintsev 5', 45'		Kasyanov 90+' (pen.)	Stadium: Trud; Attendance: 1000; Referee: Aleksandr Oryol

== Third round ==
The matches were played between 6 and 23 August 2014.

6 August 2014	Smena Komsomolsk-na-Amure (III)	2–0	Chita (III)	Komsomolsk-on-Amur
	Soltan Takazov 35'; Alborov 92'			Stadium: Avangard Stadium

6 August 2014	Metallurg-Kuzbass (III)	1–1 (a.e.t.) (1–3 p)	Baikal Irkutsk (III)	Novokuznetsk
	Narylkov 25' (pen.)		Zemlyanskiy 63'	Stadium: Metallurg Stadium; Attendance: 1000; Referee: Konstantin Molchanov
	Penalties
	Kiselev (penalty scored); Narylkov (penalty missed); Novitskiy (penalty missed); Avsyuk (penalty missed)		Galin (penalty scored); Zemlyanskiy (penalty missed); Yushchuk (penalty missed); Avagimyan (penalty scored); Kirillov (penalty scored)

11 August 2014	Nosta Novotroitsk (III)	4–5	Syzran-2003 (III)	Novotroitsk
17:00	Sergeyev 34'; Sorokin 44'; Fidan Khabibullin 59'; Yefimov 90'		Vasili Berezun 15'; Baratov 32'; Churavtsev 55'; Aleksei Pasechnik 69', 87'	Stadium: Metallurg Stadium

11 August 2014	Volga Ulyanovsk (III)	2–1	Dynamo Kirov (III)	Ulyanovsk
	Safin 14', 21'		Sukonshchikov 90' (pen.)	Stadium: Trud

11 August 2014	KAMAZ Naberezhnye Chelny (III)	1–1 (a.e.t.) (2–4 p)	Neftekhimik Nizhnekamsk (III)	Naberezhnye Chelny
	Vdovichenko 10'		Dzhalilov 79'	Stadium: KAMAZ stadium
	Penalties
	Maskayev (penalty scored); Akbashev (penalty missed); Ryzhkov (penalty scored); Chushyalov (penalty missed)		Kulikov (penalty scored); A. Moryganov (penalty scored); K. Moryganov (penalty scored); Zhuravlyov (penalty scored)

12 August 2014	Metallurg Vyksa (III)	0–1	Zvezda Ryazan (III)	Vyksa
			Voronshchikov 32'	Stadium: Metallurg Stadium; Attendance: 1800; Referee: Ilya Bugrov

12 August 2014	Kolomna (III)	3–0	Dynamo Bryansk (III)	Kolomna
	Denis Folin 19', 29'; Vikulov 67'			Stadium: Avangard Stadium; Attendance: 1500; Referee: Maksim Kaplin

12 August 2014	Tekstilshchik Ivanovo (III)	3–0	Kaluga (III)	Ivanovo
	Sagirov 8'; Lukyanov 29', 44'			Stadium: Tekstilshchik Stadium; Attendance: 5100; Referee: Oleg Evstigneev

12 August 2014	Metallurg Lipetsk (III)	2–0	Tambov (III)	Lipetsk
	Rybin 52'; Akhvlediani 90'			Stadium: Metallurg Stadium; Attendance: 1800; Referee: Evgeny Evgeny

12 August 2014	Fakel Voronezh (III)	1–0	Lokomotiv Liski (III)	Voronezh
	Sushkin 55' (pen.)			Stadium: Tsentralny Profsoyuz Stadion

16 August 2014	Druzhba Maykop (III)	0–1	Astrakhan (III)	Maykop
			Sergei Sechin 63'	Stadium: Stadium Yunost

19 August 2014	Vityaz Podolsk (III)	2–1	Podolye (III)	Podolsk
	Boyarov 3', 67' (pen.)		Povarnitsyn 38'	Stadium: Trud Stadium

23 August 2014	Chernomorets Novorossiysk (III)	2–1 (a.e.t.)	Spartak Nalchik (III)	Novorossiysk
	Shevchenko 96'; Shakhov 99'		Vasilyev 109'	Stadium: Trud

23 August 2014	SKChF Sevastopol (III)	1–0 (a.e.t.)	Taganrog (III)	Sevastopol
	Aleksei Kiryushin 97'			Stadium: Sevastopol Sports Complex

== Fourth round ==
The games were played on 30 and 31 August 2014.

30 August 2014	Sakhalin Yuzhno-Sakhalinsk (II)	0–1	Luch-Energiya (II)	Yuzhno-Sakhalinsk
			Prokofyev 66'	Stadium: Spartak Stadium

30 August 2014	Smena Komsomolsk-na-Amure (III)	1–0	SKA-Energiya Khabarovsk (II)	Komsomolsk-on-Amur
	Yashan 80'			Stadium: Avangard stadium

30 August 2014	Baikal Irkutsk (III)	1–2	Yenisey Krasnoyarsk (II)	Irkutsk
	Kirillov 90'		Gultyaev 6'; Galysh 74'	Stadium: Stadion Lokomotiv

30 August 2014	Astrakhan (III)	1–4	Krylia Sovetov Samara (II)	Astrakhan
	Sergei Sechin 12'		Tkachuk 9'; Delkin 25'; Chochiyev 55'; Yeliseyev 90'	Stadium: Sudostroitel Stadium

30 August 2014	Volga Ulyanovsk (III)	0–3	Sokol Saratov (II)	Ulyanovsk
			Molodtsov 23'; Pavlov 56'; Dutov 80'	Stadium: Trud

30 August 2014	Neftekhimik Nizhnekamsk (III)	0–3	Gazovik Orenburg (II)	Nizhnekamsk
			Appaev 14'; Koronov 56', 60'	Stadium: Neftekhimik Stadium

30 August 2014	Chernomorets Novorossiysk (III)	1–4	Anzhi Makhachkala (II)	Novorossiysk
	Shakhov 62'		Asildarov 2', 50'; Moutari 36'; Abdulavov 58'	Stadium: Trud

30 August 2014	Syzran-2003 (III)	1–0	Tyumen (II)	Syzran
	Simonov 10'			Stadium: Kristall Stadium

30 August 2014	SKChF Sevastopol (III)	0–2	Volgar Astrakhan (II)	Sevastopol
			Zhabkin 30'; Alkhazov 65'	Stadium: Sevastopol Sports Complex

31 August 2014	Sibir Novosibirsk (II)	3–2	Tom Tomsk (II)	Novosibirsk
	Markosov 5', 8' (pen.); Astafyev 85'		Bazhenov 33'; Golyshev 35'	Stadium: Spartak Stadium

31 August 2014	Kolomna (III)	1–4	Tosno (II)	Kolomna
	Vikulov 90'		Khadartsev 24', 70'; Tskhovrebov 29'; Berkhamov 77'	Stadium: Avangard Stadium

31 August 2014	Vityaz Podolsk (III)	0–3	Baltika Kaliningrad (II)	Podolsk
			Kalenkovich 20'; Stotskiy 40'; Minchenkov 75'	Stadium: Trud Stadium

31 August 2014	Metallurg Lipetsk (III)	1–1 (a.e.t.) (3–5 p)	Khimik Dzerzhinsk (II)	Lipetsk
	Kortava 31'		Ilyin 94'	Stadium: Metallurg Stadium
	Penalties
	Yeremeyev (penalty scored); Gotsuk (penalty scored); Poyarkov (penalty scored); Akhvlediani (penalty missed)		Kuzmichev (penalty scored); Shustikov (penalty scored); Shilov (penalty scored); Fedotov (penalty scored); Kostyukov (penalty scored)

31 August 2014	Tekstilshchik Ivanovo (III)	0–1 (a.e.t.)	Shinnik Yaroslavl (II)	Ivanovo
			Voydel 117'	Stadium: Tekstilshchik Stadium

31 August 2014	Fakel Voronezh (III)	2–0	Volga Nizhny Novgorod (II)	Voronezh
	Turik 14'; Biryukov 53'			Stadium: Tsentralny Profsoyuz Stadion

31 August 2014	Zvezda Ryazan (III)	1–0 (a.e.t.)	Dynamo Saint Petersburg (II)	Ryazan
	Zhdankin 116'			Stadium: Stadion Spartak

== Round of 32 ==
Clubs from Russian Football Premier League enter the competition at this round.

23 September 2014	Smena Komsomolsk-na-Amure (III)	0–1	Spartak Moscow (I)	Komsomolsk-na-Amure
15:00 VLA (UTC+11)			Yakovlev 21'	Stadium: Stadion Avangard; Attendance: 7,500; Referee: Anton Anopa

24 September 2014	Luch-Energiya (II)	0–2	Rubin Kazan (I)	Vladivostok
19:30 VLA (UTC+11)			Dyadyun 20'; Portnyagin 41'	Stadium: Dynamo Stadium; Attendance: 3,600; Referee: Aleksey Sukhoy

24 September 2014	Gazovik Orenburg (II)	2–1	Terek Grozny (I)	Orenburg
16:00 YEK (UTC+6)	Kobyalko 16', 90+2' (pen.)		Aissati 31' (pen.)	Stadium: Gazovik Stadium; Attendance: 3,100; Referee: Evgeny Turbin

24 September 2014	Yenisey Krasnoyarsk (II)	2–3 (a.e.t.)	Ufa (I)	Krasnoyarsk
15:00 MSK (UTC+4)	Markov 30' (pen.); Marushchak 89'		Handžić 2', 8'; Sukhov 103'	Stadium: Central Stadium; Attendance: 3,100; Referee: Denis Shpilev

24 September 2014	Khimik Dzerzhinsk (II)	1–2	CSKA Moscow (I)	Dzerzhinsk
19:00 MSK (UTC+8)	Stolbovoy 38'		Tagilov 67' (o.g.); Dzagoev 84'	Stadium: Khimik; Attendance: 4,800; Referee: Sergey Kulikov

24 September 2014	Sibir Novosibirsk (II)	1–3	Lokomotiv Moscow (I)	Novosibirsk
19:00 OMS (UTC+7)	Markosov 80'		Boussoufa 23' (pen.); Denisov 61'; O.Niasse 78'	Stadium: Spartak Stadium; Attendance: 10,000; Referee: Andrey Fisenko

24 September 2014	Anzhi Makhachkala (II)	1–2	Zenit Saint Petersburg (I)	Kaspiysk
19:00 MSK (UTC+4)	Boli 22'		Shatov 30'; Rondón 71'	Stadium: Anzhi-Arena; Attendance: 14,500; Referee: Vladimir Moskalyov

24 September 2014	Zvezda Ryazan (III)	1–2	Mordovia Saransk (I)	Ryazan
19:00 MSK (UTC+4)	Zhdankin 6'		R.Mukhametshin 42'; Vasin 90+2'	Stadium: Stadion Spartak; Attendance: 6,000; Referee: Yury Aponasenko

24 September 2014	Krylia Sovetov Samara (II)	3–1	Ural (I)	Samara
19:00 MSK (UTC+4)	Tkachuk 18', 59'; Jahović 41'		Manucharyan 90+2'	Stadium: Metallurg Stadion; Attendance: 5,670; Referee: Roman Galimov

24 September 2014	Syzran-2003 (III)	2–0	Rostov (I)	Syzran
19:00 MSK (UTC+4)	Churavtsev 80'; Baratov 84'			Stadium: Kristall Stadium; Attendance: 2,070; Referee: Stanislav Vasilyev

24 September 2014	Volgar Astrakhan (II)	0–1	Arsenal Tula (I)	Astrakhan
19:00 MSK (UTC+4)			Sukharev 51'	Stadium: Central Stadium; Attendance: 3,000; Referee: Artem Chistyakov

24 September 2014	Baltika Kaliningrad (II)	1–2	Kuban Krasnodar (I)	Kaliningrad
20:00 FET (UTC+3)	Tsukanov 9'		Šunjić 25'; Bugayev 73'	Stadium: Baltika Stadium; Attendance: 6,000; Referee: German Kravchenko

25 September 2014	Tosno (II)	0–0 (a.e.t.) (4–2 p)	Amkar Perm (I)	Tikhvin
15:00 MSK (UTC+4)				Stadium: Kirovets Stadium; Attendance: 2,000; Referee: Sergey Kostevich
	Penalties
	Pazin (penalty scored); Prychynenko (penalty scored); Zaytsev (penalty scored); Khadartsev (penalty scored)		Peev (penalty scored); Picușceac (penalty scored); Zanev (penalty missed); Balanovich (penalty missed)

25 September 2014	Sokol Saratov (II)	0–5	FC Krasnodar (I)	Saratov
16:00 MSK (UTC+4)			Petrov 20'; Ari 41'; Joãozinho 51', 56'; Ageyev 75'	Stadium: Lokomotiv Stadium; Attendance: 9,200; Referee: Vasiliy Kazartsev

25 September 2014	Shinnik Yaroslavl (II)	2–0	Dynamo Moscow (I)	Yaroslavl
18:00 MSK (UTC+4)	Samodin 68', 75'			Stadium: Shinnik Stadium; Attendance: 2,000; Referee: Kirill Levnikov

25 September 2014	Fakel Voronezh (III)	1–2 (a.e.t.)	Torpedo Moscow (I)	Voronezh
19:00 MSK (UTC+4)	Biryukov 82'		Katsalapov 39'; Salugin 100'	Stadium: Tsentralny Profsoyuz Stadion; Attendance: 19,800; Referee: Ivan Saraev

== Round of 16 ==
29 October 2014	CSKA Moscow (I)	2–0	Torpedo Moscow (I)	Podolsk
13:30 MSK (UTC+3)	Bazelyuk 13'; Dzagoev 39'	Summary		Stadium: Trud Stadium; Attendance: 5,800; Referee: Vladislav Bezborodov

29 October 2014	Ufa (I)	0–1	Lokomotiv Moscow (I)	Ufa
19:00 YEK (UTC+5)		Summary	Boussoufa 19'	Stadium: Dynamo Stadium; Attendance: 3,600; Referee: Vladimir Moskalyov

29 October 2014	Syzran-2003 (III)	0–1	Gazovik Orenburg (II)	Syzran
19:00 SAM (UTC+4)		Summary	Appayev 90+1'	Stadium: Kristall Stadium; Attendance: 2,070

29 October 2014	Zenit Saint Petersburg (I)	2–3 (a.e.t.)	Arsenal Tula (I)	Saint Petersburg
19:00 MSK (UTC+3)	Arshavin 20'; Rodić 71'	Summary	Kaleshin 80'; Garay 90' (o.g.); Maloyan 104'	Stadium: Petrovsky Stadium; Attendance: 17,625; Referee: Sergey Kulikov

29 October 2014	Kuban Krasnodar (I)	3–0	Tosno (II)	Krasnodar
21:00 MSK (UTC+3)	Popov 26'; Baldé 32', 35'	Summary		Stadium: Kuban Stadium; Attendance: 3,100; Referee: Timur Arslanbekov

30 October 2014	Mordovia Saransk (I)	5–1	Shinnik Yaroslavl (II)	Saransk
18:00 MSK (UTC+3)	Sysuyev 52'; Lutsenko 54', 65'; Vasin 67'; Rl.Mukhametshin	Summary	Rylov 86'	Stadium: Start Stadium; Attendance: 2,100

30 October 2014	FC Krasnodar (I)	1–3	Krylia Sovetov Samara (II)	Krasnodar
20:00 MSK (UTC+3)	Wánderson 71'	Summary	Yatchenko 47'; Chochiyev 47'; Tsallagov 88' (pen.)	Stadium: Kuban Stadium; Attendance: 4,250

30 October 2014	Rubin Kazan (I)	2–0 (a.e.t.)	Spartak Moscow (I)	Kazan
20:00 MSK (UTC+3)	Livaja 108'; Azmoun 120+6' (pen.)			Stadium: Kazan Arena; Attendance: 27,229

== Quarter-finals ==
2 March 2015	CSKA Moscow (I)	1–0	Krylia Sovetov Samara (II)	Khimki
18:00 MSK (UTC+3)	Natcho 50'	Summary		Stadium: Rodina Stadium; Attendance: 4,000; Referee: Sergey Lapochkin

2 March 2015	Kuban Krasnodar (I)	1–0	Mordovia Saransk (I)	Krasnodar
20:00 MSK (UTC+3)	Šunjić 34'	Summary		Stadium: Kuban Stadium; Attendance: 6,549; Referee: Aleksey Nikolayev

3 March 2015	Arsenal Tula (I)	0–1 (a.e.t.)	Gazovik Orenburg (II)	Tula
18:00 MSK (UTC+3)		Summary	Koronov 112'	Stadium: Arsenal Stadium; Attendance: 10,200; Referee: Sergei Ivanov

3 March 2015	Lokomotiv Moscow (I)	0–0 (a.e.t.) (4–2 p)	Rubin Kazan (I)	Moscow
20:00 MSK (UTC+3)		Summary		Stadium: Lokomotiv Stadium; Attendance: 8,223; Referee: Vladislav Bezborodov
	Penalties
	Fernandes (penalty scored); Samedov (penalty scored); Ćorluka (penalty scored); Škuletić (penalty scored)		Karadeniz (penalty missed); Livaja (penalty missed); Kuzmin (penalty scored); Navas (penalty scored)

== Semi-finals ==
29 April 2015	Gazovik Orenburg (II)	1–1 (a.e.t.) (3–4 p)	Lokomotiv Moscow (I)	Orenburg
16:30 MSK (UTC+3)	Vasiev 50'	Summary	Škuletić 87'	Stadium: Gazovik Stadium; Attendance: 4,500; Referee: Aleksandr Egorov
	Penalties
	Shogenov (penalty missed); Kobyalko (penalty scored); Druzin (penalty scored); Akhmedov (penalty missed); Malykh (penalty scored)		Fernandes (penalty scored); Škuletić (penalty missed); Samedov (penalty scored); Maicon (penalty scored); Pejčinović (penalty scored)

29 April 2015	Kuban Krasnodar (I)	1–0	CSKA Moscow (I)	Krasnodar
19:30 MSK (UTC+3)	Hugo Almeida 71'	Summary		Stadium: Kuban Stadium; Attendance: 22,397; Referee: Sergei Ivanov

== Final ==
21 May 2015
19:00 MSK (UTC+3)

Lokomotiv Moscow	3–1 (a.e.t.)	Kuban Krasnodar
Niasse 73'; Boussoufa 104'; Al. Miranchuk 111'	Summary	Ignatyev 28'

Central Stadium, Astrakhan
Attendance: 14,300
Referee: Vladislav Bezborodov (Saint Petersburg)
