= 2014–15 Russian Professional Football League =

Russian Professional Football League
- Season: 2014–15

The 2014–15 Professional Football League was the third highest division in Russian football. The Professional Football League is geographically divided into 5 zones. The winners of each zone are automatically promoted into the National Football League. The bottom finishers of each zone lose professional status and are relegated into the Amateur Football League.

== West ==
=== Standings ===
Pos	Team	Pld	W	D	L	GF	GA	GD	Pts	Promotion or relegation
1	Spartak-2 Moscow (P)	30	20	5	5	65	26	+39	65	Promotion to Russian National Football League
2	Zenit-2 St. Petersburg (P)	30	18	3	9	78	41	+37	57	Promotion to Russian National Football League
3	Strogino Moscow	30	16	6	8	39	29	+10	54	
4	Khimki	30	15	9	6	42	27	+15	54	
5	Tekstilshchik Ivanovo	30	15	8	7	51	29	+22	53	
6	Dolgoprudny	30	14	9	7	46	39	+7	51	
7	Saturn Ramenskoye	30	15	5	10	42	31	+11	50	Team voluntarily relegated after the season
8	Torpedo Vladimir	30	14	6	10	41	36	+5	48	
9	Pskov-747 Pskov	30	11	9	10	39	38	+1	42	
10	Domodedovo Moscow	30	10	8	12	48	50	−2	38	
11	Volga Tver	30	9	5	16	36	54	−18	32	
12	Solyaris Moscow	30	8	4	18	39	59	−20	28	
13	Spartak Kostroma	30	7	7	16	26	39	−13	28	
14	CRFSO Smolensk	30	7	7	16	32	49	−17	28	
15	Kolomna	30	6	5	19	28	67	−39	23	
16	Znamya Truda Orekhovo-Zuyevo	30	4	6	20	21	59	−38	18	

Source: pfl-russia.com
Rules for classification: 1st points; 2nd matches won; 3rd head-to-head (points, matches won, goal difference, goals scored, away goals scored); 4th goal difference; 5th goals scored; 6th away goals scored
(P) Promoted

=== Top scorers ===
Source: pfl-russia.com (in Russian)

20 goals

- Vladimir Obukhov (Spartak-2)

19 goals

- Ivan Lukyanov (Tekstilshchik)

18 goals

- Aleksei Medvedev (Saturn)

17 goals

- Aleksei Yevseyev (Zenit-2)

16 goals

- Ramil Sheydayev (Zenit-2)

13 goals

- Maksim Kazankov (Domodedovo/Saturn)

10 goals

- Anton Shishayev (Pskov-747)

== Center ==
=== Standings ===
Pos	Team	Pld	W	D	L	GF	GA	GD	Pts	Promotion or relegation
1	Fakel Voronezh (P)	30	25	5	0	64	14	+50	80	Promotion to Russian National Football League
2	Ryazan	30	21	6	3	51	13	+38	69	
3	Tambov	30	19	8	3	71	26	+45	65	
4	Lokomotiv Liski	30	15	8	7	34	22	+12	53	
5	Zenit Penza	30	14	7	9	32	22	+10	49	
6	Kaluga	30	14	7	9	42	31	+11	49	
7	Metallurg Lipetsk	30	13	10	7	42	39	+3	49	
8	Vityaz Podolsk	30	12	8	10	43	47	−4	44	
9	Avangard Kursk	30	13	4	13	45	35	+10	43	
10	Dynamo Bryansk	30	9	11	10	30	26	+4	38	
11	Vybor-Kurbatovo Voronezh	30	7	8	15	22	46	−24	29	Team withdrew
12	Podolye Podolsky district	30	9	1	20	30	58	−28	28	Team disbanded after the season
13	Oryol	30	5	5	20	25	59	−34	20	
14	Metallurg Vyksa	30	5	4	21	16	57	−41	19	Team withdrew
15	Chertanovo Moscow	30	4	6	20	30	63	−33	18	
16	Arsenal-2 Tula	30	1	8	21	19	54	−35	11	

Source: pfl-russia.com
Rules for classification: 1st points; 2nd matches won; 3rd head-to-head (points, matches won, goal difference, goals scored, away goals scored); 4th goal difference; 5th goals scored; 6th away goals scored
(P) Promoted

=== Top scorers ===
Source: pfl-russia.com (in Russian)

17 goals

- Mikhail Biryukov (Fakel Voronezh)

14 goals

- Nikita Zhdankin (Ryazan)

10 goals

- Igor Boyarov (Vityaz Podolsk)
- Sergei Chernyshov (Lokomotiv Liski)
- Artemi Maleyev (Avangard Kursk)

9 goals

- Roman Grigoryan (Tambov)
- Dmitri Kortava (Metallurg Lipetsk)

8 goals

- Nikita Andreev (Tambov)

== South ==
=== First round ===
==== Group 1 ====
Pos	Team	Pld	W	D	L	GF	GA	GD	Pts	Qualification
1	Chernomorets Novorossiysk (Q)	14	9	4	1	28	14	+14	31	Advances to Group A
2	Afips Afipsky (Q)	14	9	2	3	19	12	+7	29	Advances to Group A
3	Vityaz Krymsk (Q)	14	9	1	4	22	17	+5	28	Advances to Group A
4	Armavir (Q)	14	7	3	4	24	18	+6	24	Advances to Group A
5	Biolog-Novokubansk Progress (Q)	14	5	1	8	16	20	−4	16	Advances to Group A
6	Druzhba Maykop (Q)	14	3	2	9	13	20	−7	11	Advances to Group A
7	Krasnodar-2 (R, Q)	14	3	1	10	15	24	−9	10	Advances to Group B
8	Sochi (R, Q)	14	2	4	8	14	26	−12	10	Advances to Group B

Rules for classification: 1st points; 2nd matches won; 3rd head-to-head (points, matches won, goal difference, goals scored, away goals scored); 4th goal difference; 5th goals scored; 6th away goals scored
(Q) Qualified for the phase indicated; (R) Relegated

==== Group 2 ====
Pos	Team	Pld	W	D	L	GF	GA	GD	Pts	Qualification
1	Dynamo GTS Stavropol (Q)	20	11	5	4	23	11	+12	38	Advances to Group A
2	MITOS Novocherkassk (Q)	20	9	7	4	30	13	+17	34	Advances to Group A
3	Mashuk-KMV Pyatigorsk (Q)	20	9	6	5	25	22	+3	33	Advances to Group A
4	Spartak Nalchik (Q)	20	9	6	5	28	16	+12	33	Advances to Group A
5	Taganrog (Q)	20	7	7	6	18	18	0	28	Advances to Group A
6	Rotor Volgograd	20	7	6	7	26	24	+2	27	Team withdrew
7	Angusht Nazran (Q)	20	5	8	7	13	23	−10	23	Advances to Group A
8	Anzhi-2 Makhachkala (R, Q)	20	5	7	8	14	22	−8	22	Advances to Group B
9	Alania Vladikavkaz (R, Q)	20	5	6	9	21	33	−12	21	Advances to Group B
10	Terek-2 Grozny (R, Q)	20	3	9	8	12	18	−6	18	Advances to Group B
11	Astrakhan (R, Q)	20	4	5	11	19	29	−10	17	Advances to Group B

Rules for classification: 1st points; 2nd matches won; 3rd head-to-head (points, matches won, goal difference, goals scored, away goals scored); 4th goal difference; 5th goals scored; 6th away goals scored
(Q) Qualified for the phase indicated; (R) Relegated

=== Second round ===
==== Group A ====
Pos	Team	Pld	W	D	L	GF	GA	GD	Pts	Promotion
1	Armavir (P)	22	14	3	5	37	23	+14	45	Promotion to Russian National Football League
2	Vityaz Krymsk	22	14	1	7	38	26	+12	43	Team disbanded after the season
3	Chernomorets Novorossiysk	22	12	7	3	45	21	+24	43	
4	Afips Afipsky	22	12	5	5	32	18	+14	41	
5	Dynamo GTS Stavropol	22	10	6	6	26	21	+5	36	
6	MITOS Novocherkassk	22	9	3	10	24	27	−3	30	
7	Mashuk-KMV Pyatigorsk	22	7	7	8	23	27	−4	28	
8	Spartak Nalchik	22	7	5	10	26	27	−1	26	
9	Taganrog	22	5	6	11	15	31	−16	21	Team disbanded after the season
10	Druzhba Maykop	22	5	4	13	20	29	−9	19	
11	Biolog-Novokubansk Progress	22	5	3	14	19	32	−13	18	
12	Angusht Nazran	22	4	6	12	17	40	−23	18	

Source: www.pfl-russia.com
Rules for classification: 1st points; 2nd matches won; 3rd head-to-head (points, matches won, goal difference, goals scored, away goals scored); 4th goal difference; 5th goals scored; 6th away goals scored
(P) Promoted

==== Group B ====
Pos	Team	Pld	W	D	L	GF	GA	GD	Pts	Relegation
13	Anzhi-2 Makhachkala	10	6	1	3	20	15	+5	19	Team disbanded after the season
14	Alania Vladikavkaz	10	6	0	4	15	11	+4	18	
15	Astrakhan	10	5	1	4	23	15	+8	16	
16	Krasnodar-2	10	5	1	4	19	17	+2	16	
17	Terek-2 Grozny	10	2	5	3	10	15	−5	11	
18	Sochi (R)	10	1	2	7	10	24	−14	5	Relegation to Amateur Football League

Source: www.pfl-russia.com
Rules for classification: 1st points; 2nd matches won; 3rd head-to-head (points, matches won, goal difference, goals scored, away goals scored); 4th goal difference; 5th goals scored; 6th away goals scored
(R) Relegated

=== Top scorers ===
Source: pfl-russia.com (in Russian)

14 goals

- Magomed Guguyev (Spartak Nalchik)

13 goals

- Vladimir Lobkaryov (Torpedo Armavir)

12 goals

- Aleksei Domshinskiy (Druzhba)
- Atsamaz Burayev (Alania)
- Artyom Serdyuk (Torpedo Armavir)

10 goals

- Sergei Serdyukov (Dynamo GTS)
- Semyon Sinyavskiy (Chernomorets)
- Sergei Sechin (FC Astrakhan)
- Stanislav Vaniyev (Vityaz)

== Ural-Povolzhye ==
=== First round ===
Pos	Team	Pld	W	D	L	GF	GA	GD	Pts	Qualification
1	KAMAZ Naberezhnye Chelny (Q)	20	14	6	0	35	5	+30	48	Qualification for Group A
2	Zenit-Izhevsk (Q)	20	11	4	5	34	18	+16	37	Qualification for Group A
3	Chelyabinsk (Q)	20	11	2	7	24	17	+7	35	Qualification for Group A
4	Rubin-2 Kazan (Q)	20	10	4	6	34	20	+14	34	Qualification for Group A
5	Volga Ulyanovsk (Q)	20	7	12	1	27	11	+16	33	Qualification for Group A
6	Syzran-2003 (Q)	20	8	6	6	29	18	+11	30	Qualification for Group A
7	Nosta Novotroitsk (R, Q)	20	6	4	10	15	26	−11	22	Qualification for Group B
8	Neftekhimik Nizhnekamsk (R, Q)	20	5	4	11	19	29	−10	19	Qualification for Group B
9	Lada-Togliatti Togliatti (R, Q)	20	4	7	9	21	31	−10	19	Qualification for Group B
10	Dynamo Kirov (R, Q)	20	3	6	11	13	31	−18	15	Qualification for Group B
11	Spartak Yoshkar-Ola (R, Q)	20	1	5	14	12	57	−45	8	Qualification for Group B

Source: pfl-russia rfspro.ru
Rules for classification: 1st points; 2nd matches won; 3rd head-to-head (points, matches won, goal difference, goals scored, away goals scored); 4th goal difference; 5th goals scored; 6th away goals scored
(Q) Qualified for the phase indicated; (R) Relegated

=== Second round ===
==== Group A ====
Pos	Team	Pld	W	D	L	GF	GA	GD	Pts	Promotion
1	KAMAZ Naberezhnye Chelny (P)	25	16	7	2	39	10	+29	55	Promotion to Russian National Football League
2	Zenit-Izhevsk	25	12	6	7	39	24	+15	42	
3	Syzran-2003	25	11	8	6	37	19	+18	41	
4	Chelyabinsk	25	12	4	9	27	22	+5	40	
5	Rubin-2 Kazan	25	11	7	7	39	25	+14	40	Team disbanded after the season
6	Volga Ulyanovsk	25	8	14	3	29	16	+13	38	

Source: pfl-russia rfspro.ru
Rules for classification: 1st points; 2nd matches won; 3rd head-to-head (points, matches won, goal difference, goals scored, away goals scored); 4th goal difference; 5th goals scored; 6th away goals scored
(P) Promoted

==== Group B ====
Pos	Team	Pld	W	D	L	GF	GA	GD	Pts	Relegation
7	Nosta Novotroitsk	24	7	7	10	22	30	−8	28	
8	Neftekhimik Nizhnekamsk	24	7	5	12	24	32	−8	26	
9	Lada-Togliatti Togliatti	24	5	9	10	27	36	−9	24	
10	Dynamo Kirov	24	4	8	12	17	36	−19	20	
11	Spartak Yoshkar-Ola (R)	24	1	7	16	17	67	−50	10	Relegation to Amateur Football League

Source: pfl-russia rfspro.ru
Rules for classification: 1st points; 2nd matches won; 3rd head-to-head (points, matches won, goal difference, goals scored, away goals scored); 4th goal difference; 5th goals scored; 6th away goals scored
(R) Relegated

=== Top scorers ===
Source: pfl-russia.com (in Russian)

11 goals

- Ruslan Galiakberov (Rubin-2 Kazan)

8 goals

- Pavel Shadrin (Rubin-2 Kazan)
- Dmitri Otstavnov (Neftekhimik / Rubin-2 Kazan)
- Denis Uryvkov (Chelyabinsk)

== East ==
=== Standings ===
Pos	Team	Pld	W	D	L	GF	GA	GD	Pts	Promotion
1	Baikal Irkutsk (P)	24	11	11	2	37	18	+19	44	Promotion to Russian National Football League
2	Irtysh Omsk	24	12	7	5	35	17	+18	43	
3	Metallurg Novokuznetsk	24	11	10	3	38	19	+19	43	
4	Smena Komsomolsk-na-Amure	24	10	8	6	25	20	+5	38	
5	Chita	24	10	6	8	27	30	−3	36	
6	Dynamo Barnaul	24	10	4	10	43	39	+4	34	
7	Yakutiya Yakutsk	24	6	2	16	28	47	−19	20	
8	Sibir-2 Novosibirsk	24	5	5	14	27	40	−13	20	
9	Tom-2 Tomsk	24	5	3	16	25	55	−30	18	

Source: pfl-russia.com
Rules for classification: 1st points; 2nd matches won; 3rd head-to-head (points, matches won, goal difference, goals scored, away goals scored); 4th goal difference; 5th goals scored; 6th away goals scored
(P) Promoted

=== Top scorers ===
Source: pfl-russia.com (in Russian)

9 goals

- Konstantin Maltsev (Yakutiya/Metallurg Novokuznetsk)
- Yevgeni Shcherbakov (Dynamo Barnaul)
- Dmitri Galin (Baikal)

8 goals

- Anton Kiselyov (Metallurg Novokuznetsk)

7 goals

- Eduard Krug (Dynamo Barnaul)
- Viktor Sergeyev (Sibir-2)
