= 2013–14 Russian Professional Football League =

Russian Professional Football League
- Season: 2013–14

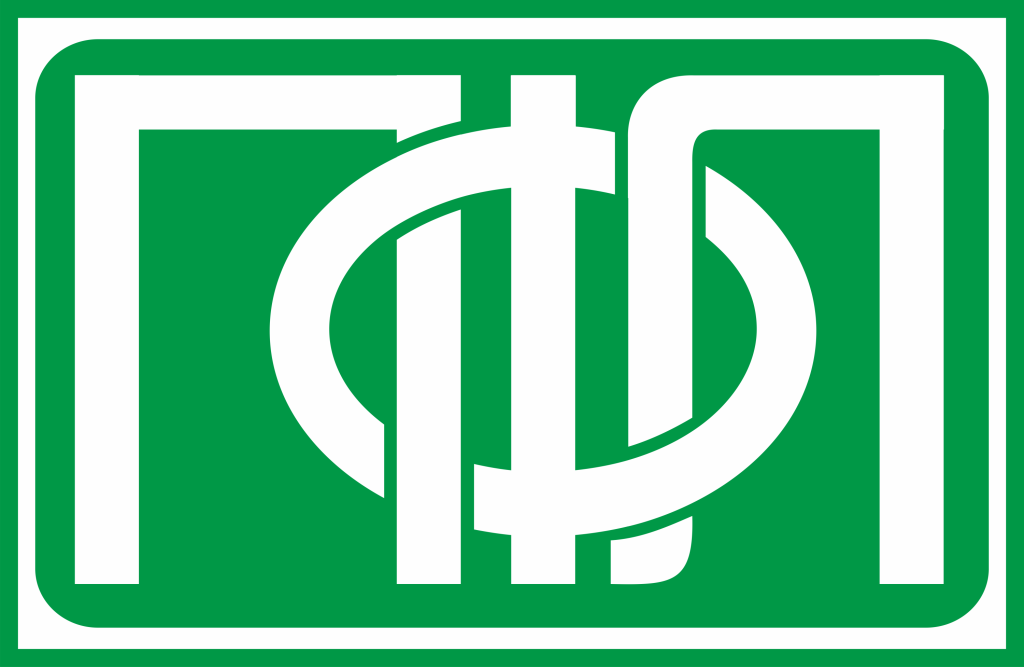
Professional Football League (Russia) logo

The 2013–14 Professional Football League was the twenty-third season of a third division in Russian football and the first under this name. The Professional Football League is geographically divided into 5 zones. The winners of each zone are automatically promoted into the National Football League. The bottom finishers of each zone lose professional status and are relegated into the Amateur Football League.

== West ==
=== Standings ===
Pos	Team	Pld	W	D	L	GF	GA	GD	Pts	Promotion or relegation
1	Tosno (P)	32	21	8	3	51	16	+35	71	Promotion to Russian National Football League
2	Tekstilshchik Ivanovo	32	20	7	5	58	32	+26	67	
3	Khimki	32	16	10	6	67	37	+30	58	
4	Pskov-747 Pskov	32	17	5	10	44	31	+13	56	
5	CRFSO Smolensk	32	15	7	10	48	43	+5	52	
6	Torpedo Vladimir	32	14	7	11	48	38	+10	49	
7	Sever Murmansk	32	13	9	10	39	34	+5	48	Team withdrew
8	Dolgoprudny	32	12	9	11	40	32	+8	45	
9	Lokomotiv-2 Moscow	32	11	12	9	49	40	+9	45	Team withdrew
10	Zenit-2 St. Petersburg	32	11	10	11	43	43	0	43	
11	Strogino Moscow	32	11	6	15	37	39	−2	39	
12	Spartak Kostroma	32	10	6	16	31	33	−2	36	
13	Kolomna	32	10	5	17	32	56	−24	35	
14	Znamya Truda Orekhovo-Zuyevo	32	7	9	16	19	52	−33	30	
15	Vologda	32	7	8	17	34	49	−15	29	Team withdrew
16	Volga Tver	32	6	8	18	28	52	−24	26	
17	Rus Saint Petersburg (R)	32	4	8	20	16	57	−41	20	Team withdrew (Note: Rus withdrew from the league in February 2014 due to financial problems)

Source: rfspro.ru
Rules for classification: 1st points; 2nd matches won; 3rd head-to-head (points, matches won, goal difference, goals scored, away goals scored); 4th goal difference; 5th goals scored; 6th away goals scored
(P) Promoted; (R) Relegated

=== Top scorers ===
Source: rfspro.ru (in Russian)

20 goals

- Anzor Sanaya (Tekstilshchik)

15 goals

- Yevgeni Kobzar (Lokomotiv-2)

14 goals

- Aleksei Zhdanov (Sever)

13 goals

- Yevgeni Losev (Tekstilshchik)

12 goals

- Aleksandr Savin (Tosno)

11 goals

- Anton Shishayev (Pskov-747)

10 goals

- Artyom Motov (Vologda)
- Dmitri Proshin (Pskov-747)
- Maksim Zimarev (Torpedo)

== Center ==
=== Standings ===
Pos	Team	Pld	W	D	L	GF	GA	GD	Pts	Promotion or relegation
1	Sokol Saratov (P)	30	21	6	3	62	24	+38	69	Promotion to Russian National Football League
2	Vityaz Podolsk	30	19	3	8	51	32	+19	60	
3	Fakel Voronezh	30	17	9	4	47	21	+26	60	
4	Spartak-2 Moscow	30	15	5	10	58	40	+18	50	
5	Dynamo Bryansk	30	14	6	10	35	32	+3	48	
6	Kaluga	30	12	9	9	44	36	+8	45	
7	Avangard Kursk	30	12	6	12	37	39	−2	42	
8	Podolye Podolsky district	30	13	3	14	41	52	−11	42	
9	Metallurg Lipetsk	30	11	7	12	35	36	−1	40	
10	Zenit Penza	30	7	14	9	28	29	−1	35	
11	Zvezda Ryazan	30	7	12	11	20	30	−10	33	
12	Tambov	30	8	7	15	38	44	−6	31	
13	Metallurg Vyksa	30	6	11	13	25	40	−15	29	
14	Oryol	30	8	5	17	30	41	−11	29	
15	Lokomotiv Liski	30	7	8	15	31	42	−11	29	
16	Metallurg-Oskol Stary Oskol (R)	30	4	7	19	22	66	−44	19	Team withdrew (Note: Metallurg-Oskol withdrew from the league in February 2014 due to financial problems)

Source: rfspro.ru
Rules for classification: 1st points; 2nd matches won; 3rd head-to-head (points, matches won, goal difference, goals scored, away goals scored); 4th goal difference; 5th goals scored; 6th away goals scored
(P) Promoted; (R) Relegated

=== Top scorers ===
Source: rfspro.ru (in Russian)

15 goals

- Aleksandr Degtyaryov (Sokol)

13 goals

- Vladimir Obukhov (Spartak-2)

11 goals

- Yevgeni Povarnitsyn (Podolye)
- Mikhail Tynyany (Tambov)

10 goals

- Igor Boyarov (Vityaz)
- Azamat Gonezhukov (Sokol)
- Vadim Minich (Dynamo Bryansk)
- Ruslan Shoniya (Vityaz)

9 goals

- Aleksandr Kozlov (Spartak-2)

== South ==
=== Standings ===
Pos	Team	Pld	W	D	L	GF	GA	GD	Pts	Promotion or relegation
1	Volgar Astrakhan (P)	34	28	6	0	73	15	+58	90	Promotion to Russian National Football League
2	Chernomorets Novorossiysk	34	27	4	3	74	19	+55	85	
3	Vityaz Krymsk	34	17	9	8	48	31	+17	60	
4	Olimpia Volgograd	34	17	7	10	51	35	+16	58	
5	Dagdizel Kaspiysk	34	16	7	11	41	36	+5	55	
6	MITOS Novocherkassk	34	15	9	10	42	27	+15	54	
7	Astrakhan	34	14	9	11	43	36	+7	51	
8	SKVO Rostov-on-Don	34	13	11	10	39	30	+9	50	
9	Gazprom transgaz Stavropol Ryzdvyany	34	13	8	13	37	32	+5	47	
10	Armavir	34	12	10	12	41	41	0	46	
11	Taganrog	34	12	7	15	38	47	−9	43	
12	Mashuk-KMV Pyatigorsk	34	9	7	18	28	54	−26	34	
13	Alania-d Vladikavkaz	34	10	3	21	43	46	−3	33	
14	Biolog-Novokubansk Progress	34	7	12	15	37	53	−16	33	
15	Druzhba Maykop	34	8	8	18	26	47	−21	32	
16	Terek-2 Grozny	34	7	9	18	30	53	−23	30	
17	Krasnodar-2	34	7	6	21	35	66	−31	27	
18	Energiya Volzhsky (R)	34	5	6	23	31	70	−39	21	Relegation to Amateur Football League

Source: rfspro.ru
Rules for classification: 1st points; 2nd matches won; 3rd head-to-head (points, matches won, goal difference, goals scored, away goals scored); 4th goal difference; 5th goals scored; 6th away goals scored
(P) Promoted; (R) Relegated

=== Top scorers ===
Source: rfspro.ru (in Russian)

22 goals

- Sergei Verkashanskiy (Chernomorets)

20 goals

- Aleksandr Alkhazov (Volgar)

19 goals

- Dmitry Akhba (Volgar)

16 goals

- Anatoly Shevchenko (Chernomorets)

13 goals

- Viktor Borisov (Olimpia)
- Tofik Kadimov (Dagdizel)
- Dzambolat Khastsayev (Alania-d)

12 goals

- Roman Smolskiy (MITOS)

11 goals

- Mikhail Biryukov (SKVO)

10 goals

- Oleg Aleynik (Olimpia)
- Sergei Sinyayev (Chernomorets)

== Ural-Povolzhye ==
=== Standings ===
Pos	Team	Pld	W	D	L	GF	GA	GD	Pts	Qualification
1	Tyumen (P)	27	19	4	4	44	17	+27	61	Qualification for Championship group
2	Volga Ulyanovsk	27	19	3	5	40	23	+17	60	Qualification for Championship group
3	KAMAZ Naberezhnye Chelny	27	15	4	8	44	36	+8	49	Qualification for Championship group
4	Chelyabinsk	27	13	5	9	45	25	+20	44	Qualification for Championship group
5	Zenit-Izhevsk	27	10	10	7	28	19	+9	40	Qualification for Championship group
6	Syzran-2003	27	10	10	7	33	30	+3	40	Qualification for Championship group
7	Lada-Togliatti Togliatti	27	9	8	10	31	31	0	35	Qualification for Relegation group
8	Nosta Novotroitsk	27	6	11	10	30	32	−2	29	Qualification for Relegation group
9	Oktan Perm	27	5	10	12	17	35	−18	25	Qualification for Relegation group
10	Dynamo Kirov	27	5	8	14	16	23	−7	23	Qualification for Relegation group
11	Spartak Yoshkar-Ola	27	2	12	13	20	41	−21	18	Qualification for Relegation group
12	Rubin-2 Kazan	27	3	7	17	18	54	−36	16	Qualification for Relegation group

Source: rfspro.ru
Rules for classification: 1st points; 2nd matches won; 3rd head-to-head (points, matches won, goal difference, goals scored, away goals scored); 4th goal difference; 5th goals scored; 6th away goals scored
(P) Promoted

=== Top scorers ===
Source: rfspro.ru (in Russian)

16 goals

- Dmitri Zarva (Chelyabinsk)

9 goals

- Marat Safin (Volga)
- Denis Uryvkov (Chelyabinsk)

7 goals

- Mikhail Kanayev (Tyumen)
- Andrei Samoylov (Syzran-2003)

== East ==
=== Standings ===
Pos	Team	Pld	W	D	L	GF	GA	GD	Pts	Promotion or relegation
1	Sakhalin Yuzhno-Sakhalinsk (P)	24	15	6	3	44	16	+28	51	Promotion to Russian National Football League
2	Chita	24	12	6	6	31	20	+11	42	
3	Smena Komsomolsk-na-Amure	24	12	5	7	33	18	+15	41	
4	Amur-2010 Blagoveshchensk	24	11	5	8	30	24	+6	38	
5	Baikal Irkutsk	24	9	9	6	31	20	+11	36	
6	Yakutiya Yakutsk	24	10	5	9	36	36	0	35	
7	Irtysh Omsk	24	8	8	8	28	28	0	32	
8	Sibir-2 Novosibirsk	24	4	2	18	15	45	−30	14	
9	Sibiryak Bratsk (R)	24	2	4	18	11	52	−41	10	Relegation to Amateur Football League

Source: rfspro.ru
Rules for classification: 1st points; 2nd matches won; 3rd head-to-head (points, matches won, goal difference, goals scored, away goals scored); 4th goal difference; 5th goals scored; 6th away goals scored
(P) Promoted; (R) Relegated

=== Top scorers ===
Source: rfspro.ru (in Russian)

8 goals

- Anton Bagayev (Irtysh)
- Aleksei Nekrasov (Baikal)

7 goals

- Aleksandr Gagloyev (Sakhalin)
- Roman Kuklin (Amur-2010)

6 goals

- Azer Aliyev (Sakhalin)
- Ibragim Bazayev (Amur-2010)
- Sergei Vinogradov (Sakhalin)

5 goals

- Vyacheslav Bokov (Smena)
- Yakov Ehrlich (Sakhalin)
- Almaz Fatikhov (Chita)
- Vyacheslav Kirillov (Chita)
- Aleksei Sabanov (Sibiryak)
