= Dmytrenko =

Dmytrenko (Ukrainian: Дмитренко), sometimes transliterated Dmitrenko, is a Ukrainian surname, derived from the given name Dmitry. It may refer to:

== People ==
=== Dmytrenko ===
- Dmytro Dmytrenko (born 1973), Ukrainian figure skater
- Mychajlo Dmytrenko (1908–1996), Ukrainian-American painter
- Hryhoriy Dmytrenko (born 1945), Ukrainian rower
- Khrystyna Dmytrenko (born 1999), Ukrainian biathlete
- Oksana Dmytrenko Platero (born 1988) Ukrainian dancer
- Ruslan Dmytrenko (born 1986), Ukrainian racewalker
- Vladyslav Dmytrenko (born 2000), Ukrainian footballer
- Volodymyr Dmytrenko (born 1995), Ukrainian footballer

=== Dmitrenko ===
- Ekaterina Dmitrenko (born 1990), Russian footballer
- Oleg Dmitrenko (born 1984), Russian footballer
- Viktor Dmitrenko (born 1991), Kazakhstani footballer
