= Yevgeni Shcherbakov =

Russian footballer

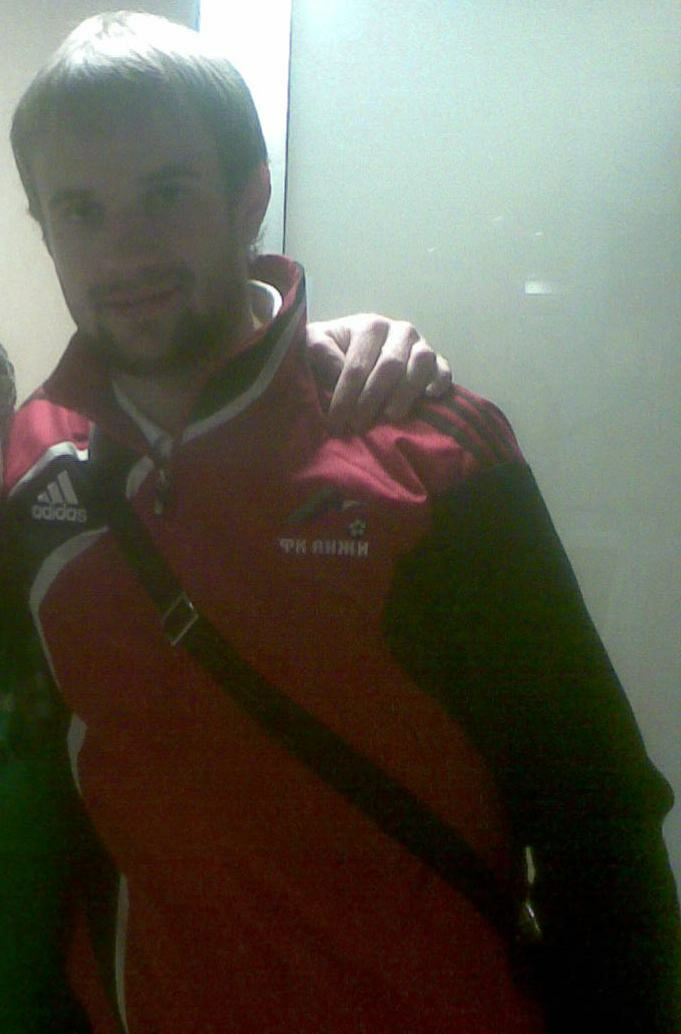

Personal information
- Full name: Yevgeni Nikolayevich Shcherbakov
- Date of birth: 18 February 1986 (age 40)
- Place of birth: Minusinsk, Russian SFSR
- Height: 1.80 m (5 ft 11 in)
- Position: Midfielder

Youth career
- FC Dynamo Barnaul

Senior career*
| Years | Team | Apps | (Gls) |
| 2004–2005 | FC Dynamo Barnaul | 53 | (8) |
| 2006–2008 | FC Amkar Perm | 10 | (0) |
| 2008 | → FC Dynamo Barnaul (loan) | 15 | (1) |
| 2009 | FC Anzhi Makhachkala | 4 | (1) |
| 2010–2011 | FC Chita | 26 | (4) |
| 2011–2012 | FC Irtysh Omsk | 18 | (6) |
| 2012–2013 | FC Sokol Saratov | 18 | (1) |
| 2014 | FC Dynamo Barnaul | 16 | (9) |
| 2015 | FC Vityaz Krymsk | 13 | (1) |
| 2015–2016 | FC Dynamo Barnaul | 16 | (2) |
| 2016 | FC Syzran-2003 | 9 | (0) |
| 2017 | FC Raspadskaya Mezhdurechensk (amateur) | | |
| 2017–2018 | FC Novokuznetsk (amateur) | | |
| 2018–2019 | FC Chita | 19 | (8) |
| 2019–2020 | FC Sakhalin Yuzhno-Sakhalinsk | 12 | (3) |
| 2020–2022 | FC Dynamo Barnaul | 40 | (6) |
- * Club domestic league appearances and goals

Yevgeni Nikolayevich Shcherbakov (Russian: Евгений Николаевич Щербаков; born 18 February 1986) is a Russian former professional footballer.

== Club career ==
He made his debut in the Russian Premier League for FC Amkar Perm on 17 March 2006 in a game against FC Moscow.
