= Aleksandr Derepovsky =

Russian footballer and manager

Personal information
- Full name: Aleksandr Vasilyevich Derepovsky
- Date of birth: 10 August 1962 (age 64)
- Place of birth: Omsk, Russian SFSR
- Height: 1.83 m (6 ft 0 in)
- Positions: Forward; midfielder

Senior career*
Years	Team	Apps	(Gls)
1980–1990	FC Irtysh Omsk	221	(69)
1991	FC Tselinnik Tselinograd	6	(0)
1991	FC Gazovik Izhevsk	10	(0)
1992	FC Rubin-TAN Kazan	5	(0)
1992	FC Irtysh Omsk	12	(1)

Managerial career
- 1995–2002: FC Irtysh Omsk (assistant)
- 2004: FC Metallurg-Kuzbass Novokuznetsk (assistant)
- 2009–2013: FC Yenisey Krasnoyarsk (assistant)
- 2014–2015: FC Baikal Irkutsk (assistant)
- 2015: FC Baikal Irkutsk
- 2016–2018: FC Irtysh Omsk
- 2018–2019: FC Irtysh Omsk (assistant)
- * Club domestic league appearances and goals

Aleksandr Vasilyevich Derepovsky (Russian: Александр Васильевич Дереповский; born 10 August 1962) is a Russian football manager and a former player.

Derepovsky played in the Russian First Division with FC Irtysh Omsk and FC Rubin Kazan.
