= Kochnev =

Kochnev or Kotchnev (Russian: Кочнев) is a Russian masculine surname, its feminine counterpart is Kochneva or Kotchneva. Notable people with the surname include:

- Aleksandr Kochnev (born 1987), Russian football player
- Anna Kotchneva (born 1970), Soviet rhythmic gymnast
- Dmitry Kochnev (born 1964), Russian director of the Federal Protective Service.
- Yuri Kochnev (born 1942), Russian conductor of classical music
