= Maksim Bobylev =

Russian footballer

Personal information
- Full name: Maksim Sergeyevich Bobylev
- Date of birth: 30 May 1992 (age 34)
- Place of birth: Yaroslavl, Russia
- Height: 1.76 m (5 ft 9 in)
- Position: Midfielder

Youth career
- 1998–2011: FC Shinnik Yaroslavl

Senior career*
Years	Team	Apps	(Gls)
2012	FC Shinnik Yaroslavl	1	(0)
2012–2013	FC Znamya Truda Orekhovo-Zuyevo	41	(1)
2014–2015	FC Kolomna	25	(4)
2015	FC Pskov-747 Pskov	15	(0)
- * Club domestic league appearances and goals

Maksim Sergeyevich Bobylev (Russian: Максим Серге́евич Бобылёв; born 30 May 1992) is a former Russian professional football player.

== Career ==
Bobylev is a product of FC Shinnik Yaroslavl's youth system, and he joined the senior side in the Russian Football National League during 2012. He made his debut on 8 May 2012 in a game against FC Mordovia Saransk.
