= Bogdan Aleshchenko =

Russian footballer

Personal information
- Full name: Bogdan Aleksandrovich Aleshchenko
- Date of birth: 12 May 1994 (age 32)
- Place of birth: Pryluky, Ukraine
- Height: 1.74 m (5 ft 9 in)
- Position: Midfielder

Youth career
- 2011: FC Torpedo Moscow
- 2012–2013: FC Shinnik Yaroslavl

Senior career*
Years	Team	Apps	(Gls)
2013–2014	FC Shinnik Yaroslavl	2	(0)
2014–2015	FC Sochi	12	(0)
2016	FC Tambov	0	(0)
- * Club domestic league appearances and goals

Bogdan Aleksandrovich Aleshchenko (Russian: Богдан Александрович Алещенко; born 12 May 1994) is a former Russian football midfielder.

== Club career ==
He made his debut in the Russian Football National League for FC Shinnik Yaroslavl on 23 November 2013 in a game against FC Mordovia Saransk.
