= Viktor Isaychenko =

Russian footballer

Personal information
- Full name: Viktor Viktorovich Isaychenko
- Date of birth: 8 February 1976 (age 50)
- Height: 1.85 m (6 ft 1 in)
- Positions: Defender; midfielder

Senior career*
Years	Team	Apps	(Gls)
1992	FC Politekhnik-92 Barnaul	2	(0)
1994	FC Politekhnik-92 Barnaul	12	(0)
1996–1999	FC Metallurg Novokuznetsk	119	(1)
2000–2004	FC Tom Tomsk	101	(1)
2004	FC Metallurg-Kuzbass Novokuznetsk	19	(0)
2005	FC Spartak Chelyabinsk	39	(0)
2006	FC Zvezda Irkutsk	28	(0)
2007–2013	FC Dynamo Barnaul	125	(1)
- * Club domestic league appearances and goals

Viktor Viktorovich Isaychenko (Russian: Виктор Викторович Исайченко; born 8 February 1976) is a former Russian professional football player.

== Club career ==
He played 7 seasons in the Russian Football National League for 4 different teams.
