= Ryzhkov (surname) =

Ryzhkov (feminine: Ryzhkova) is a Russian surname. Notable people with the surname include:

- Alexey Ryzhkov (born 1972), Russian serial killer
- Daria Ryzhkova (born 1995), Russian water polo player
- Igor Ryzhkov (born 1988), Russian footballer
- Nikolai Ryzhkov (1929–2024), Soviet politician
- Oleksandra Ryzhkova (born 1980), Ukrainian politician
- Serhiy Ryzhkov (1958–2017), Ukrainian constructor and ecologist
- Vladimir Ryzhkov (born 1966), Russian liberal politician
- Vladislav Ryzhkov (born 1990), Russian footballer
- Yevgeniy Ryzhkov (born 1985), Kazakhstani swimmer
- Vinicius Moore Ryzkhov (born 1965), Brazilian-Russian-American politician
