= Anton Kiselyov =

Russian footballer

Personal information
- Full name: Anton Viktorovich Kiselyov
- Date of birth: 5 November 1986 (age 40)
- Place of birth: Barnaul, Russian SFSR
- Height: 1.81 m (5 ft 11 1/2 in)
- Position: Midfielder

Senior career*
Years	Team	Apps	(Gls)
2006–2009	FC Dynamo Barnaul	100	(12)
2010	FC Kuban Krasnodar	22	(1)
2011–2012	FC SKA-Energiya Khabarovsk	29	(1)
2012–2013	FC Metallurg-Kuzbass Novokuznetsk	30	(2)
2013	FC Luch-Energiya Vladivostok	10	(0)
2014	FC SKA-Energiya Khabarovsk	9	(0)
2014–2015	FC Metallurg Novokuznetsk	21	(11)
2015–2016	FC Baikal Irkutsk	33	(3)
2016–2017	FC Sochi	22	(4)
2017–2018	FC Dynamo Barnaul	8	(0)
- * Club domestic league appearances and goals

Anton Viktorovich Kiselyov (Russian: Антон Викторович Киселёв; born 5 November 1986) is a former Russian professional football player.

== Club career ==
He played six seasons in the Russian Football National League for seven different teams.
