= Eldar Mamedov =

Eldar Mamedov is the name of:

- Eldar Mamedov (footballer) (born 1990), Russian football player
- Eldar Mammadov (born 1968), Azerbaijani military figure
