= Vyacheslav Zemlyansky =

Russian footballer

Personal information
- Full name: Vyacheslav Yuryevich Zemlyansky
- Date of birth: 9 May 1986 (age 40)
- Place of birth: Svetly, Kaliningrad Oblast, Russian SFSR
- Height: 1.86 m (6 ft 1 in)
- Position: Midfielder

Senior career*
Years	Team	Apps	(Gls)
2005–2007	FC Baltika-2 Kaliningrad	52	(3)
2008	FC Zenit Penza	23	(0)
2009–2010	FC Metallurg-Kuzbass Novokuznetsk	51	(6)
2011–2013	FC Smena Komsomolsk-na-Amure	57	(4)
2013–2014	FC Tosno	16	(3)
2014–2015	FC Baikal Irkutsk	44	(2)
2016–2017	FC Baltika Kaliningrad	2	(0)
2023	FC Peresvet Domodedovo	15	(2)
- * Club domestic league appearances and goals

Vyacheslav Yuryevich Zemlyansky (Russian: Вячеслав Юрьевич Землянский; born 9 May 1986) is a Russian former professional football player.

== Club career ==
He played two seasons in the Russian Football National League for FC Baikal Irkutsk and FC Baltika Kaliningrad. He also played beach soccer in 2017.
