= Aleksei Churavtsev =

Russian professional football player

Personal information
- Full name: Aleksei Vladimirovich Churavtsev
- Date of birth: 1 April 1984 (age 42)
- Height: 1.85 m (6 ft 1 in)
- Positions: Midfielder; forward

Senior career*
| Years | Team | Apps | (Gls) |
| 2001–2004 | FC Lada Togliatti | 49 | (1) |
| 2005 | FC Neftyanik Ufa | 27 | (3) |
| 2006–2007 | FC Lada Togliatti | 49 | (3) |
| 2008 | FC Gornyak Uchaly | 29 | (2) |
| 2009 | FC Lada Togliatti | 19 | (7) |
| 2010 | FC Sokol Saratov | 25 | (5) |
| 2011 | FC Volga Ulyanovsk | 11 | (1) |
| 2011 | FC Kaluga | 9 | (0) |
| 2012 | FC Pskov-747 | 8 | (0) |
| 2012–2014 | FC Lada-Togliatti | 43 | (3) |
| 2014–2015 | FC Syzran-2003 | 20 | (1) |
| 2015–2016 | FC Lada-Togliatti | 20 | (2) |
| 2016–2017 | FC Ocean Kerch | | |
| 2017–2019 | FC Lada-Togliatti | 37 | (6) |
| 2019 | FC Lada Dimitrovgrad (amateur) | | |
| 2019 | FC Volna Kovernino (amateur) | | |
| 2020 | FC Zenit Penza (amateur) | | |
- * Club domestic league appearances and goals

Aleksei Vladimirovich Churavtsev (Russian: Алексей Владимирович Чуравцев; born 1 April 1984) is a Russian former professional football player.

== Club career ==
He made his Russian Football National League debut for FC Lada Togliatti on 20 April 2001 in a game against FC Neftekhimik Nizhnekamsk.
