= Spitsyn =

Spitsyn (Cyrillic Спи́цын), Spytsyn, or Spytsin may refer to:

People

- Alexandr Spitsyn, archaeologist
- Ilya Spitsyn, footballer
- Valeriy Spitsyn, race walker

Archaeology

- The Spitsyn culture of the early Upper Paleolithic Don River (modern Russia), typified by layer XVII of the Kostyonki (Palaeolithic site), and named after Alexandr Spitsyn.
