= Ilya Setov =

Russian footballer

Personal information
- Full name: Ilya Sergeyevich Setov
- Date of birth: 3 August 1994 (age 32)
- Place of birth: Kaliningrad, Russia
- Height: 1.76 m (5 ft 9 1/2 in)
- Position: Midfielder

Senior career*
Years	Team	Apps	(Gls)
2013–2014	FC Baltika Kaliningrad	4	(0)
2014	FC Baikal Irkutsk	5	(0)
2015–2016	FC Baltika-M Kaliningrad		
2016	FC SKA Rostov-on-Don	3	(0)
- * Club domestic league appearances and goals

Ilya Sergeyevich Setov (Russian: Илья Сергеевич Сетов; born 3 August 1994) is a former Russian football midfielder.

== Club career ==
He made his debut in the Russian Football National League for FC Baltika Kaliningrad on 10 November 2013 in a game against FC Neftekhimik Nizhnekamsk.
