= Sergei Narylkov =

Russian footballer

Personal information
- Full name: Sergei Viktorovich Narylkov
- Date of birth: 7 October 1987 (age 39)
- Place of birth: Chernogorsk, Khakassia, Russian SFSR
- Height: 1.68 m (5 ft 6 in)
- Position: Midfielder

Youth career
- AUOR Barnaul

Senior career*
Years	Team	Apps	(Gls)
2005–2011	Dynamo Barnaul	162	(21)
2012–2013	Metallurg Novokuznetsk	43	(4)
2015	Baikal Irkutsk	21	(1)
2016–2017	Chita	20	(10)
2017–2019	Shinnik Yaroslavl	62	(3)
2019–2022	Novosibirsk	53	(3)
2022–2023	Irtysh Omsk	21	(1)
2023–2025	Sibir Novosibirsk	33	(1)
- * Club domestic league appearances and goals

Sergei Viktorovich Narylkov (Russian: Серге́й Викторович Нарылков; born 7 October 1987) is a Russian former professional football player.

== Club career ==
He made his Russian Football National League debut for Dynamo Barnaul on 27 March 2008 in a game against Ural Yekaterinburg.

== Honours ==
- Russian Professional Football League Zone East best player, top scorer: 2016–17.
