= David Ikanovich =

Russian footballer

Personal information
- Full name: David Dzhamaliyevich Ikanovich
- Date of birth: 11 July 1989 (age 37)
- Place of birth: Ordzhonikidze, Russian SFSR
- Height: 1.88 m (6 ft 2 in)
- Position: Goalkeeper

Team information
- Current team: FC Metallurg Lipetsk (GK coach)

Senior career*
Years	Team	Apps	(Gls)
2009–2010	FC Sportakademklub Moscow	15	(0)
2011–2013	FC Metallurg Lipetsk	10	(0)
2013–2015	FC Baikal Irkutsk	51	(0)
2016	FC Chita	7	(0)
2017	FC Armavir	2	(0)
2017	FC Rodnik Parshinovka		
2019–2022	FC Metallurg Lipetsk	22	(0)

Managerial career
- 2023–2024: FC Metallurg Lipetsk (U19 GK coach)
- 2024–: FC Metallurg Lipetsk (GK coach)
- * Club domestic league appearances and goals

David Dzhamaliyevich Ikanovich (Russian: Давид Джамалиевич Иканович; born 11 July 1989) is a Russian professional football coach and a former player. He is the goalkeeping coach with FC Metallurg Lipetsk.

== Club career ==
He made his Russian Football National League debut for FC Baikal Irkutsk on 11 July 2015 in a game against FC Arsenal Tula.

== Personal life ==
David is the son of former professional football goalkeeper, Dzhamal Ikanovich.
