= Sergei Simonov (footballer) =

Russian footballer

Personal information
- Full name: Sergei Sergeyevich Simonov
- Date of birth: 9 December 1983 (age 42)
- Height: 1.83 m (6 ft 0 in)
- Position: Midfielder

Youth career
- SDYuSShOR-5 Krasnodar

Senior career*
Years	Team	Apps	(Gls)
2000–2002	FC Venets Gulkevichi	110	(15)
2003–2004	FC Vityaz Krymsk	41	(2)
2005–2006	FC Dynamo Kirov	36	(2)
2007	FC Gazovik Orenburg	25	(4)
2008	FC Chernomorets Novorossiysk	37	(3)
2009	FC Baltika Kaliningrad	13	(0)
2009–2010	FC Tyumen	19	(0)
2010	FC Neftekhimik Nizhnekamsk	12	(1)
2011–2012	FC Volga Ulyanovsk	31	(0)
2012	FC Dynamo Kirov	18	(0)
2013	FC Astrakhan	10	(1)
2013–2018	FC Syzran-2003	95	(8)
- * Club domestic league appearances and goals

Sergei Sergeyevich Simonov (Russian: Серге́й Серге́евич Симонов; born 9 December 1983) is a former Russian professional football player.

== Club career ==
He played two seasons in the Russian Football National League for FC Chernomorets Novorossiysk and FC Baltika Kaliningrad.
