= Yevgeni Markov =

Yevgeni Markov may refer to:

- Yevgeni Ivanovich Markov (1769–1828), Russian military commander
- Evgeny Markov (writer) (1835–1903), Russian writer
- Evgeny Markov (politician) (born 1973), Russian politician
- Yevgeni Markov (footballer, born 1978), Russian football defender/midfielder
- Yevgeni Markov (footballer, born 1994), Russian football forward
- Evgeny Markov (strongman), Russian strongman
