= Vladimir Avsyuk =

Russian footballer

Personal information
- Full name: Vladimir Viktorovich Avsyuk
- Date of birth: 15 January 1982 (age 44)
- Height: 1.79 m (5 ft 10 in)
- Position: Midfielder

Senior career*
Years	Team	Apps	(Gls)
2005	FC Zenit-2 Saint Petersburg	13	(0)
2005–2008	FC Metallurg-Kuzbass Novokuznetsk	99	(3)
2009–2010	FC Vityaz Podolsk	45	(4)
2010	FC Dynamo Saint Petersburg	17	(0)
2011–2013	FC Metallurg-Kuzbass Novokuznetsk	53	(2)
2014	FC Metallurg Novokuznetsk	10	(0)
- * Club domestic league appearances and goals

Vladimir Viktorovich Avsyuk (Russian: Владимир Викторович Авсюк; born 15 January 1982) is a former Russian professional football player.

== Club career ==
He played six seasons in the Russian Football National League for FC Metallurg-Kuzbass Novokuznetsk, FC Vityaz Podolsk, and FC Dynamo Saint Petersburg.
