= Dmitri Kortava =

Russian footballer

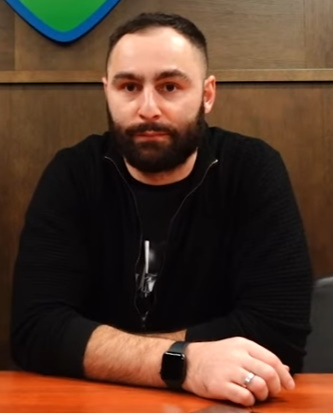

Personal information
- Full name: Dmitri Giviyevich Kortava
- Date of birth: 17 November 1990 (age 35)
- Place of birth: Gagra, Georgian SSR
- Height: 1.83 m (6 ft 0 in)
- Position: Forward

Youth career
- Torpedo Moscow

Senior career*
Years	Team	Apps	(Gls)
2009	Rostov	0	(0)
2010	Sportakademklub Moscow	26	(6)
2012	Podolye Podolsky	8	(5)
2012–2013	Torpedo Moscow	11	(1)
2013	Metallurg Lipetsk	20	(7)
2014	Fakel Voronezh	4	(0)
2014–2015	Metallurg Lipetsk	28	(10)
2015	Baikal Irkutsk	21	(2)
2016	Luch-Energiya Vladivostok	7	(0)
2016–2017	Neftekhimik Nizhenkamsk	18	(0)

International career
2016–2017	Abkhazia	5	(7)
- * Club domestic league appearances and goals

Dmitri Giviyevich Kortava (Russian: Дмитрий Гивиевич Кортава; born 17 November 1990) is a former professional footballer who played as a forward.

== Club career ==
He made his Russian Football National League debut for FC Torpedo Moscow on 6 September 2012 in a game against PFC Spartak Nalchik. He played 4 seasons in the FNL for 4 different teams.
