= Alan Alborov (footballer) =

Russian professional football player

Personal information
- Full name: Alan Aleksandrovich Alborov
- Date of birth: 28 October 1989 (age 37)
- Place of birth: Ordzhonikidze, Russian SFSR
- Height: 1.75 m (5 ft 9 in)
- Positions: Defender; midfielder

Youth career
- PFC CSKA Moscow

Senior career*
Years	Team	Apps	(Gls)
2006–2008	PFC CSKA Moscow	0	(0)
2008–2009	FC KAMAZ Naberezhnye Chelny	1	(0)
2009	→ FC Irtysh Omsk (loan)	26	(1)
2010–2012	FC Gornyak Uchaly	58	(3)
2012–2013	FC Metallurg-Kuzbass Novokuznetsk	3	(0)
2013–2014	FC Smena Komsomolsk-na-Amure	34	(4)
2015	FC Neftekhimik Nizhnekamsk	8	(0)
2015–2016	FC Alania Vladikavkaz	22	(0)
2016–2019	FC Spartak Vladikavkaz	80	(0)
2019–2020	FC Inter Cherkessk	11	(0)
2020–2021	FC Mashuk-KMV Pyatigorsk	23	(0)
2021	FC Tuapse	15	(0)

International career
2007	Russia U-19	5	(1)
2008	Russia U-20	3	(0)
- * Club domestic league appearances and goals

Alan Aleksandrovich Alborov (Russian: Алан Александрович Алборов; born 28 October 1989) is a Russian former professional football player.

== Club career ==
He made his Russian Football National League debut for FC KAMAZ Naberezhnye Chelny on 15 September 2008 in a game against FC Dynamo Barnaul.
