= Mikhail Kanayev =

Russian footballer

Personal information
- Full name: Mikhail Aleksandrovich Kanayev
- Date of birth: 1 October 1989 (age 37)
- Place of birth: Komsomolsk-on-Amur, Russian SFSR
- Height: 1.77 m (5 ft 10 in)
- Position: Midfielder

Youth career
- FC Dynamo St. Petersburg
- Master-Saturn Yegoryevsk

Senior career*
| Years | Team | Apps | (Gls) |
| 2007–2010 | FC Saturn-2 Moscow Oblast | 58 | (0) |
| 2008 | → FC Meteor Zhukovsky (amateur) (loan) | | |
| 2010 | → FC Khimki (loan) | 17 | (0) |
| 2010 | → FC Vityaz Podolsk (loan) | 10 | (0) |
| 2011–2012 | FC Gazovik Orenburg | 26 | (1) |
| 2012–2013 | → FC Volga Ulyanovsk (loan) | 26 | (2) |
| 2013–2015 | FC Tyumen | 50 | (7) |
| 2015–2016 | FC Zenit-Izhevsk Izhevsk | 24 | (3) |
| 2016–2017 | FC Torpedo Moscow | 20 | (2) |
| 2017–2021 | FC Neftekhimik Nizhnekamsk | 86 | (5) |
| 2021–2022 | FC Shinnik Yaroslavl | 23 | (0) |
| 2023 | FC Dynamo Vologda | 10 | (2) |
| 2023 | FC Tekstilshchik Ivanovo | 9 | (0) |
| 2024 | FC Znamya Truda Orekhovo-Zuyevo | 26 | (1) |
| 2025 | FC Kolomna | 26 | (0) |
- * Club domestic league appearances and goals as of 2 November 2025

Mikhail Aleksandrovich Kanayev (Russian: Михаил Александрович Канаев; born 1 October 1989) is a Russian professional football player.

== Club career ==
He made his Russian Football National League debut for FC Khimki on 28 March 2010 in a game against FC Salyut Belgorod.
