= Lev Korolyov (footballer) =

Russian footballer

Personal information
- Full name: Lev Vladimirovich Korolyov
- Date of birth: 3 June 1986 (age 40)
- Place of birth: Sochi, Russian SFSR, Soviet Union
- Height: 1.83 m (6 ft 0 in)
- Position: Midfielder

Youth career
- DYuSSh-4 Sochi

Senior career*
Years	Team	Apps	(Gls)
2004	FC Rodnik Alekseyevskaya		
2005–2008	FC Sochi-04	69	(14)
2008–2010	FC Zhemchuzhina-Sochi	67	(10)
2010	→ FC Khimki (loan)	10	(0)
2011–2012	FC Metallurg Lipetsk	16	(2)
2012	FC Chernomorets Novorossiysk	2	(0)
2012–2013	FC Metallurg Lipetsk	20	(6)
2014–2015	FC Sochi	2	(0)
- * Club domestic league appearances and goals

Lev Vladimirovich Korolyov (Russian: Лев Владимирович Королёв; born 3 June 1986) is a former Russian professional football player.

== Club career ==
He played in the Russian Football National League for FC Zhemchuzhina-Sochi and FC Khimki in 2010. He was then a player for FC Sochi when he retired in 2015.
