= Vyacheslav Kirillov =

Russian footballer

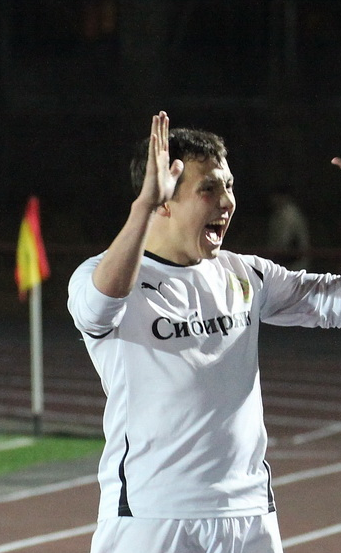

Personal information
- Full name: Vyacheslav Anatolyevich Kirillov
- Date of birth: 20 June 1989 (age 37)
- Place of birth: Bratsk, Russian SFSR
- Height: 1.74 m (5 ft 8 1/2 in)
- Position: Forward

Senior career*
Years	Team	Apps	(Gls)
2005–2011	FC Sibiryak Bratsk	148	(31)
2012–2013	FC Metallurg-Kuzbass Novokuznetsk	26	(6)
2013–2014	FC Chita	19	(7)
2014–2015	FC Baikal Irkutsk	44	(7)
2016	FC Baltika Kaliningrad	15	(1)
2016–2017	FC Smena Komsomolsk-na-Amure	11	(2)
- * Club domestic league appearances and goals

Vyacheslav Anatolyevich Kirillov (Russian: Вячеслав Анатольевич Кириллов; born 20 June 1989) is a former Russian professional football player.

== Club career ==
He played three seasons in the Russian Football National League for FC Metallurg-Kuzbass Novokuznetsk, FC Baikal Irkutsk and FC Baltika Kaliningrad.
