= Renat Baratov =

Russian football forward

Personal information
- Full name: Renat Rakhmetzhanovich Baratov
- Date of birth: 30 April 1991 (age 35)
- Place of birth: Novopokrovskaya, Krasnodar Krai, Russian SFSR
- Height: 1.84 m (6 ft 0 in)
- Position: Forward

Senior career*
| Years | Team | Apps | (Gls) |
| 2009–2010 | FC Kuban Krasnodar | 0 | (0) |
| 2011–2014 | FC Torpedo Armavir | 50 | (6) |
| 2014–2015 | FC Syzran-2003 | 15 | (6) |
| 2017–2018 | FC Syzran-2003 | 14 | (3) |
| 2018 | FC Pioner Leningradskaya | | |
- * Club domestic league appearances and goals

Renat Rakhmetzhanovich Baratov (Uyghur: Renat Rahmetjan ugli baratov; Russian: Ренат Рахметжанович Баратов; born 30 April 1991) is a Russian former football forward.

== Career ==
Baratov made his professional debut for FC Kuban Krasnodar on 15 July 2009 in the Russian Cup game against FC Sibir Novosibirsk.
