= Aleksei Domshinskiy =

Russian football forward

Personal information
- Full name: Aleksei Yevgenyevich Domshinskiy
- Date of birth: 9 January 1990 (age 36)
- Place of birth: Krasnodar, Russian SFSR
- Height: 1.85 m (6 ft 1 in)
- Position: Forward

Youth career
- –2005: Vagonik Krasnodar
- 2005–2008: FC Sportakademklub Moscow

Senior career*
Years	Team	Apps	(Gls)
2010	FC NATsFNT Krasnodar		
2011–2012	FC Urozhay Kushchyovskaya		
2013–2014	FC Torpedo Armavir	39	(10)
2015	FC Druzhba Maykop	13	(8)
2015–2016	FC Neftekhimik Nizhnekamsk	17	(5)
2016	FC Sokol Saratov	23	(1)
2017–2018	FC Syzran-2003	15	(2)
2018	FC Kaluga	10	(0)
2019	FC Druzhba Maykop	4	(0)
- * Club domestic league appearances and goals

Aleksei Yevgenyevich Domshinskiy (Russian: Алексей Евгеньевич Домшинский; born 9 January 1990) is a Russian former football forward.

== Club career ==
He made his debut in the Russian Second Division for FC Torpedo Armavir on 26 April 2013 in a game against FC Slavyansky Slavyansk-na-Kubani.

He made his Russian Football National League debut for FC Sokol Saratov on 11 July 2016 in a game against FC Zenit-2 Saint Petersburg. 2016 was his only season in the FNL so far.
