= Sergei Anisimov =

Russian footballer

Personal information
- Full name: Sergei Pavlovich Anisimov
- Date of birth: 9 February 1990 (age 36)
- Place of birth: Kolpashevo, Russian SFSR
- Height: 1.99 m (6 ft 6 in)
- Positions: Defender; midfielder

Youth career
- FC Shinnik Yaroslavl

Senior career*
Years	Team	Apps	(Gls)
2008–2009	FC Shinnik Yaroslavl	4	(0)
2010–2012	FC Spartak Kostroma	54	(2)
2012–2013	FC Znamya Truda Orekhovo-Zuyevo	17	(0)
2014	FC Mashuk-KMV Pyatigorsk	8	(0)
2014	FC Kolomna	19	(2)
2015	FC Astrakhan	29	(0)
2016–2017	FC Kaluga	16	(2)
- * Club domestic league appearances and goals

Sergei Pavlovich Anisimov (Russian: Серге́й Павлович Анисимов; born 9 February 1990) is a Russian former professional footballer.

== Club career ==
He made his debut in the Russian Premier League in 2008 for FC Shinnik Yaroslavl.
