= Aleksandr Dutov =

Russian footballer

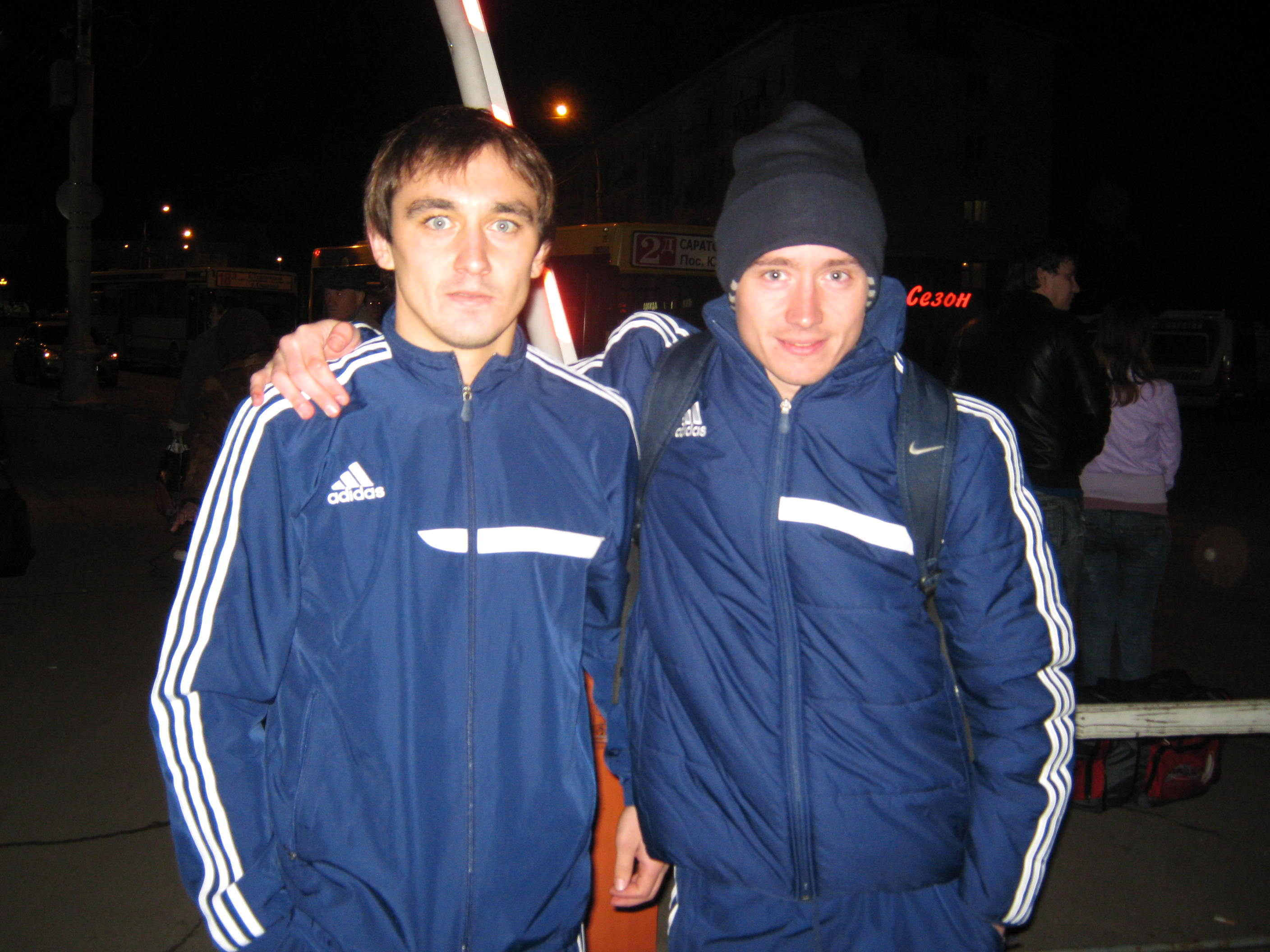

Personal information
- Full name: Aleksandr Anatolyevich Dutov
- Date of birth: 5 August 1982 (age 44)
- Place of birth: Boguchar, Russian SFSR
- Height: 1.75 m (5 ft 9 in)
- Position: Midfielder

Team information
- Current team: FC Rubin Kazan (assistant coach)

Senior career*
Years	Team	Apps	(Gls)
1999–2000	FC Olimpia Volgograd	8	(0)
2002–2004	FC Uralan Elista	10	(0)
2004	FC Lisma-Mordovia Saransk	19	(0)
2005	FC Metallurg-Kuzbass Novokuznetsk	13	(0)
2005	FC Volga Nizhny Novgorod	11	(0)
2006–2007	FC Mordovia Saransk	70	(4)
2008	FC Dynamo-Voronezh Voronezh	26	(5)
2009–2011	FC Mordovia Saransk	74	(4)
2012	FC Salyut Belgorod	4	(0)
2012–2013	FC Tyumen	21	(0)
2013–2015	FC Sokol Saratov	59	(5)
2015–2016	FC Fakel Voronezh	10	(0)
2016–2018	FC Tambov	43	(0)
2018–2019	FC Fakel Voronezh	9	(0)

Managerial career
- 2019–2022: FC Fakel Voronezh (assistant)
- 2022: FC Rubin Kazan (assistant)
- 2023–: FC Rubin Kazan (assistant)
- * Club domestic league appearances and goals

Aleksandr Anatolyevich Dutov (Russian: Александр Анатольевич Дутов; born 5 August 1982) is a Russian professional football coach and a former player. He is an assistant coach with FC Rubin Kazan.

== Club career ==
He made his debut in the Russian Premier League in 2002 for FC Uralan Elista.
