= Azamat Balkarov =

Russian professional football player

Personal information
- Full name: Azamat Zaurovich Balkarov
- Date of birth: 5 February 1987 (age 39)
- Place of birth: Nalchik, Russian SFSR
- Height: 1.75 m (5 ft 9 in)
- Position: Midfielder

Team information
- Current team: Dynamo Stavropol (fitness coach)

Youth career
- Elbrus Nalchik

Senior career*
Years	Team	Apps	(Gls)
2004–2005	PFC Spartak-2 Nalchik		
2006–2008	PFC Spartak Nalchik	0	(0)
2009	FC Stavropolye-2009	2	(0)
2009–2010	FC Angusht Nazran	47	(3)
2011–2013	FC Biolog-Novokubansk Progress	42	(2)
2013–2015	FC Vityaz Krymsk	50	(2)
2015–2016	PFC Spartak Nalchik	22	(0)
2017	FC Chernomorets Novorossiysk	11	(0)
2018	FC Kubanskaya Korona Shevchenko		
2019	FC TSK Simferopol		
2019–2020	FC Aromat Otradnaya		

Managerial career
- 2025–: Dynamo Stavropol (fitness coach)
- * Club domestic league appearances and goals

Azamat Zaurovich Balkarov (Russian: Азамат Заурович Балкаров; born 5 February 1987) is a Russian professional football coach and a former player. He is the fitness coach with Dynamo Stavropol.

== Club career ==
He made his Russian Football National League debut for PFC Spartak Nalchik on 11 July 2016 in a game against FC Kuban Krasnodar.
