= Arkadi Akopyan =

Russian footballer

Personal information
- Full name: Arkadi Aleksandrovich Akopyan
- Date of birth: 11 May 1984 (age 42)
- Place of birth: Pavlovsky, Krasnodar Krai, Russian SFSR
- Height: 1.75 m (5 ft 9 in)
- Positions: Midfielder; forward

Senior career*
Years	Team	Apps	(Gls)
2001	FC Chernomorets Novorossiysk (reserves)		
2003	FC Chernomorets Novorossiysk (reserves)		
2004–2005	FC Volgar-Gazprom Astrakhan	26	(2)
2005	FC Spartak-UGP Anapa	11	(3)
2006	FC Chernomorets Novorossiysk	16	(5)
2007	FC Spartak-UGP Anapa	9	(1)
2008	FC Lada Togliatti	15	(1)
2009	FC Fakel-Voronezh Voronezh	16	(2)
2009	FC FSA Voronezh	6	(1)
2010–2011	FC Fakel Voronezh	32	(3)
2011–2013	FC Metallurg Lipetsk	48	(7)
2013–2014	FC Vityaz Krymsk	18	(1)
2014–2015	FC Metallurg Lipetsk	27	(3)
2015–2017	FC Dynamo Bryansk	40	(5)
- * Club domestic league appearances and goals

Arkadi Aleksandrovich Akopyan (Russian: Аркадий Александрович Акопян; born 11 May 1984) is a former Armenian Russian professional footballer.

== Club career ==
He made his Russian Football National League debut for FC Volgar-Gazprom Astrakhan on 16 May 2005 in a game against FC Chkalovets-1936 Novosibirsk.
