= Eduard Krug =

Russian footballer

Personal information
- Full name: Eduard Sergeyevich Krug
- Date of birth: 21 May 1991 (age 35)
- Height: 1.82 m (5 ft 11 1/2 in)
- Positions: Forward; midfielder

Senior career*
Years	Team	Apps	(Gls)
2008	FC Sibir-2 Novosibirsk	27	(3)
2009–2010	FC Sibir Novosibirsk	1	(0)
2011–2013	FC Sibir-2 Novosibirsk	15	(2)
2014–2015	FC Dynamo Barnaul	15	(7)
2015	FC Novokuznetsk	16	(1)
2016	FC Irtysh Omsk	7	(0)
- * Club domestic league appearances and goals

Eduard Sergeyevich Krug (Russian: Эдуард Серге́евич Круг; born 21 May 1991) is a former Russian professional football player.

== Club career ==
He made his Russian Football National League debut for FC Sibir Novosibirsk on 3 May 2009 in a game against FC Nizhny Novgorod.

== Personal life ==
He is the younger brother of Yevgeny Krug.
