= Nikolay Boyarintsev =

Russian footballer

Personal information
- Full name: Nikolay Yuryevich Boyarintsev
- Date of birth: 16 April 1988 (age 38)
- Place of birth: Gorky, Russian SFSR
- Height: 1.83 m (6 ft 0 in)
- Position: Forward

Senior career*
Years	Team	Apps	(Gls)
2005–2007	FC Krasnodar-2000	54	(20)
2008–2009	FC Chernomorets Novorossiysk	34	(4)
2009	→ FC Krasnodar-2000 (loan)	9	(1)
2010	FC Nizhny Novgorod	0	(0)
2010	→ FC Neftekhimik Nizhnekamsk (loan)	5	(0)
2011	FC Torpedo Armavir	19	(2)
2012	FC Slavyansky Slavyansk-na-Kubani	2	(0)
2012	FC Oryol	7	(0)
2013	FC Taganrog	17	(4)
2013–2014	FC Biolog-Novokubansk Progress	19	(3)
2014–2016	FC Chernomorets Novorossiysk	55	(19)
2016–2017	FC Chayka Peschanokopskoye	23	(8)
2017–2018	FC Chernomorets Novorossiysk	26	(5)
2018–2019	FC Kolos Beloglinskiy Rayon		
- * Club domestic league appearances and goals

Nikolay Yuryevich Boyarintsev (Russian: Никола́й Ю́рьевич Боя́ринцев; born 16 April 1988) is a Russian former professional association football player.

== Club career ==
He made his Russian Football National League debut for FC Chernomorets Novorossiysk on 27 March 2008 in a game against FC Chernomorets Novorossiysk. He played in the FNL in 2009 for Chernomorets as well.
