= Tofik Kadimov =

Russian footballer

Personal information
- Full name: Tofik Radzhabovich Kadimov
- Date of birth: 16 January 1989 (age 37)
- Place of birth: Makhachkala, Russian SFSR
- Height: 1.85 m (6 ft 1 in)
- Position: Forward

Senior career*
| Years | Team | Apps | (Gls) |
| 2012 | FC Dagdizel Kaspiysk | 4 | (0) |
| 2013–2014 | FC Dagdizel Kaspiysk | 34 | (13) |
| 2014 | FC Baltika Kaliningrad | 11 | (0) |
| 2016–2017 | FC Legion-Dynamo Makhachkala | 27 | (8) |
| 2017–2020 | FC Druzhba Maykop | 75 | (9) |
| 2020–2021 | FC Chernomorets Novorossiysk | 14 | (0) |
- * Club domestic league appearances and goals

Tofik Radzhabovich Kadimov (Russian: Тофик Раджабович Кадимов; born 16 January 1989) is a Russian former football forward.

== Club career ==
He made his debut in the Russian Second Division for FC Dagdizel Kaspiysk on 26 July 2012 in a game against FC Olimpia Volgograd.

He made his Russian Football National League debut for FC Baltika Kaliningrad on 6 July 2014 in a game against FC Shinnik Yaroslavl.
