= Nikolai Averyanov (footballer) =

Russian footballer

Personal information
- Full name: Nikolai Aleksandrovich Averyanov
- Date of birth: 27 November 1989 (age 36)
- Height: 1.70 m (5 ft 7 in)
- Position: Midfielder

Youth career
- FC Strogino Moscow

Senior career*
Years	Team	Apps	(Gls)
2007	FC Strogino Moscow (amateur)		
2008–2009	FC Gazovik Orenburg	9	(0)
2010	FC Dynamo Saint Petersburg	2	(0)
2010	FC Nika Moscow	22	(0)
2011–2013	FC Oryol	78	(8)
2014	FC Rosich Moscow		
2014	FC Volga Tver	12	(0)
2015–2017	FC Znamya Truda Orekhovo-Zuyevo	58	(4)
2017	FC Kuntsevo Moscow		
- * Club domestic league appearances and goals

Nikolai Aleksandrovich Averyanov (Russian: Николай Александрович Аверьянов; born 27 November 1989) is a former Russian professional football player.

== Club career ==
He played in the Russian Football National League for FC Dynamo Saint Petersburg in 2010.
