= Ekaterina Dmitrenko =

Russian footballer (born 1990)

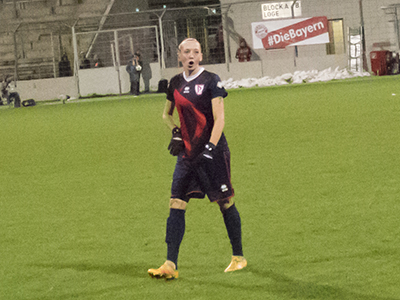

Personal information
- Full name: Ekaterina Dmitrenko
- Date of birth: 16 January 1990 (age 36)
- Position: Defender

Team information
- Current team: FC Yenisey Krasnoyarsk

Senior career*
Years	Team	Apps	(Gls)
2009	UOR Zvezda Zvenigorod	9	(1)
2010–2011	WFC Rossiyanka	26	(2)
2011–2012	FC Zorky Krasnogorsk	6	(1)
2012–2013	CSP Izmailovo	19	(0)
2013–2017	WFC Rossiyanka	47	(3)
2018–2019	Ryazan-VDV	8	(0)
2019–	FC Yenisey Krasnoyarsk		

International career^{‡}
2013–	Russia	13	(1)
- * Club domestic league appearances and goals as of 21:39, 16 April 2016 (UTC) ‡ National team caps and goals as of 21:39, 16 April 2016 (UTC)

Ekaterina Dmitrenko (born 16 January 1990) is a Russian footballer who plays as a defender for FC Yenisey Krasnoyarsk.

== Honours ==
WFC Rossiyanka

Winner

- Russian Women's Football Championship: 2010

Runner-up

- Russian Women's Football Championship: 2015
- Russian Women's Cup (2): 2012, 2013
