= Mychajlo Dmytrenko =

Mychajlo Serhiyovych Dmytrenko (Ukrainian: Михайло Сергійович Дмитренко; November 9, 1908, Lokhvytsi, Poltava, Russian Empire – March 8, 1997) was a Ukrainian painter of world recognition.

Dmytrenko settled in Detroit and examples of his work can be found there. Along with his other works Dmytrenko was responsible for the interior design of the St. George Ukrainian Catholic Church in the East Village, Manhattan between 1977 and 1989.

== Education ==
He graduated from the Kyiv State Art Institute in 1930, where he studied with Fedir Krychevsky.
