= Denis Uryvkov =

Russian footballer

Personal information
- Full name: Denis Sergeyevich Uryvkov
- Date of birth: 28 March 1985 (age 41)
- Height: 1.82 m (5 ft 11 1/2 in)
- Positions: Forward; midfielder

Senior career*
Years	Team	Apps	(Gls)
2002	FC Metallurg-Zapsib Novokuznetsk	2	(0)
2004	FC Shakhtyor Prokopyevsk	5	(1)
2004–2005	FC Metallurg-Kuzbass Novokuznetsk	13	(0)
2005	FC Kuzbass-Dynamo Kemerovo	16	(2)
2006	FC Shakhtyor Prokopyevsk	31	(0)
2007–2008	FC Metallurg-Kuzbass Novokuznetsk	12	(0)
2008	FC KUZBASS Kemerovo	12	(3)
2009–2010	FC Metallurg-Kuzbass Novokuznetsk	52	(13)
2011–2018	FC Chelyabinsk	163	(48)
2018–2020	FC Novokuznetsk (amateur)		
2020	FC Chelyabinsk	6	(1)
- * Club domestic league appearances and goals

Denis Sergeyevich Uryvkov (Russian: Денис Серге́евич Урывков; born 28 March 1985) is a Russian former professional football player.

== Club career ==
He made his Russian Football National League debut for FC Metallurg-Kuzbass Novokuznetsk on 9 July 2004 in a game against FC Terek Grozny.
