= Igor Ryzhkov =

Russian footballer

Personal information
- Full name: Igor Vladimirovich Ryzhkov
- Date of birth: 15 April 1988 (age 38)
- Place of birth: Tolyatti, Russian SFSR
- Height: 1.78 m (5 ft 10 in)
- Positions: Midfielder; defender

Senior career*
Years	Team	Apps	(Gls)
2006	FC Lada-2 Tolyatti		
2006–2009	FC Lada-Tolyatti	74	(0)
2010	FC Khimik Dzerzhinsk	15	(0)
2011–2012	FC Syzran-2003	13	(0)
2012–2014	FC Lada-Tolyatti	31	(2)
2014–2015	FC KAMAZ Naberezhnye Chelny	22	(0)
2015–2019	FC Syzran-2003	64	(2)
2019–2020	FC Akron Tolyatti	14	(0)
2020–2021	FC Kuban-Holding Pavlovskaya	21	(1)
2021–2022	FC Lada-Tolyatti	23	(0)
- * Club domestic league appearances and goals

Igor Vladimirovich Ryzhkov (Russian: Игорь Владимирович Рыжков; born 15 April 1988) is a Russian former professional football player.

== Club career ==
He made his Russian Football National League debut for FC Lada-Tolyatti on 17 August 2006 in a game against FC Ural Yekaterinburg.
