= Shamil Kurbanov =

Azerbaijani-Russian footballer (born 1993)

Personal information
- Full name: Shamil Zukrulakhovich Kurbanov
- Date of birth: 10 April 1993 (age 33)
- Place of birth: Kurovskoye, Russia
- Height: 1.74 m (5 ft 8 1/2 in)
- Positions: Midfielder; defender

Senior career*
| Years | Team | Apps | (Gls) |
| 2010 | FC Saturn Moscow Region | 0 | (0) |
| 2011–2012 | FC Volga Nizhny Novgorod | 0 | (0) |
| 2013 | FC Baltika Kaliningrad | 9 | (0) |
| 2014 | FC Sever Murmansk | 8 | (0) |
| 2014–2015 | FC Saturn Ramenskoye | 16 | (0) |
| 2015 | FC Volga Tver | 7 | (0) |
| 2016 | FC Znamya Truda Orekhovo-Zuyevo | 8 | (1) |
| 2016–2017 | FC Dynamo Stavropol | 13 | (0) |
| 2017 | FC Luki-Energiya Velikiye Luki | 9 | (0) |
| 2018–2019 | FC Sibir Novosibirsk | 12 | (1) |
| 2019 | FC FShM Torpedo Moscow (amateur) | | |
| 2020 | FC Zorky Krasnogorsk | 0 | (0) |

International career
| 2011 | Azerbaijan U18 | 2 | (0) |
- * Club domestic league appearances and goals

Shamil Zukrulakhovich Kurbanov (Russian: Шамиль Зукрулахович Курбанов; born 10 April 1993) is an Azerbaijani-Russian former football player.

== Club career ==
He made his debut in the Russian Football National League for FC Baltika Kaliningrad on 18 March 2013 in a game against FC Petrotrest Saint Petersburg.
