= Yevgeni Markov (footballer, born 1978) =

Russian footballer

Personal information
- Full name: Yevgeni Viktorovich Markov
- Date of birth: 1 July 1978 (age 48)
- Height: 1.83 m (6 ft 0 in)
- Positions: Defender; midfielder

Senior career*
Years	Team	Apps	(Gls)
1999	FC Oazis Yartsevo	19	(0)
1999–2002	FC Kristall Smolensk	51	(1)
2003–2004	FC Metallurg-Kuzbass Novokuznetsk	47	(1)
2004	FC Vityaz Podolsk	6	(0)
2005–2006	FC Baltika Kaliningrad	66	(17)
2007	FC Zvezda Irkutsk	31	(1)
2008	FC Metallurg Lipetsk	16	(0)
2009–2010	FC Dnepr Smolensk	31	(7)
- * Club domestic league appearances and goals

Yevgeni Viktorovich Markov (Russian: Евгений Викторович Марков; born 1 July 1978) is a former Russian professional football player.

== Club career ==
He played 8 seasons in the Russian Football National League for 4 different teams.
