= Marat Safin (footballer, born 1985) =

Russian footballer

Personal information
- Full name: Marat Anvaryevich Safin
- Date of birth: 7 June 1985 (age 41)
- Place of birth: Dimitrovgrad, Russia
- Height: 1.79 m (5 ft 10 in)
- Position: Midfielder

Youth career
- FC Lada Dimitrovgrad

Senior career*
Years	Team	Apps	(Gls)
2004–2005	FC Lada-SOK Dimitrovgrad	31	(1)
2007–2015	FC Volga Ulyanovsk	203	(51)
2015–2016	FC Zenit-Izhevsk	27	(13)
2016–2017	FC Sochi	29	(16)
2017	FC Armavir	19	(2)
2018–2019	FC Volga Ulyanovsk	41	(4)
- * Club domestic league appearances and goals

Marat Anvaryevich Safin (Russian: Марат Анварьевич Сафин; born 7 June 1985) is a Russian former professional football player. He is an ethnic Tatar.

== Club career ==
He made his Russian Football National League debut for FC Volga Ulyanovsk on 9 April 2008 in a game against FC Mashuk-KMV Pyatigorsk.

== Honours ==
- Russian Professional Football League Zone Ural-Povolzhye Best Player: 2015–16.
- Russian Professional Football League Zone South Best Player: 2016–17.
