= Aleksandr Kochnev =

Russian footballer

Personal information
- Full name: Aleksandr Anatolyevich Kochnev
- Date of birth: 21 August 1987 (age 39)
- Height: 1.79 m (5 ft 10 1/2 in)
- Position: Midfielder

Senior career*
Years	Team	Apps	(Gls)
2005–2006	FC Chkalovets Novosibirsk	34	(1)
2007	FC Metallurg-Kuzbass Novokuznetsk	1	(0)
2007	FC Shakhtyor Prokopyevsk	10	(1)
2008	FC Lider Novosibirsk (amateur)		
2009–2010	FC Metallurg-Kuzbass Novokuznetsk	24	(0)
2011–2012	FC Yakutiya Yakutsk	12	(0)
2012	FC Chita	19	(0)
- * Club domestic league appearances and goals

Aleksandr Anatolyevich Kochnev (Russian: Александр Анатольевич Кочнев); born 21 August 1987, is a former Russian professional football player.

== Club career ==
He played in the Russian Football National League for FC Metallurg-Kuzbass Novokuznetsk in 2007.
