= Andrei Prudnikov =

Russian footballer

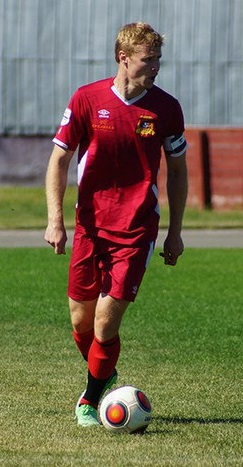

Personal information
- Full name: Andrei Vladimirovich Prudnikov
- Date of birth: 9 September 1984 (age 42)
- Place of birth: Rudnya, Smolensk Oblast, Russian SFSR
- Height: 1.88 m (6 ft 2 in)
- Position: Forward

Senior career*
Years	Team	Apps	(Gls)
2004	Polotsk	11	(0)
2005–2009	FC Rudnya		
2010–2012	Dnepr Smolensk	79	(19)
2013	Naftan Novopolotsk	7	(0)
2013–2016	Dnepr Smolensk	80	(14)
- * Club domestic league appearances and goals

Andrei Vladimirovich Prudnikov (Russian: Андрей Владимирович Прудников; born 9 September 1984) is a former Russian professional football player.

== Club career ==
He played in the Belarusian Premier League for FC Naftan Novopolotsk in 2013.
