= Maksim Zimarev =

Russian footballer

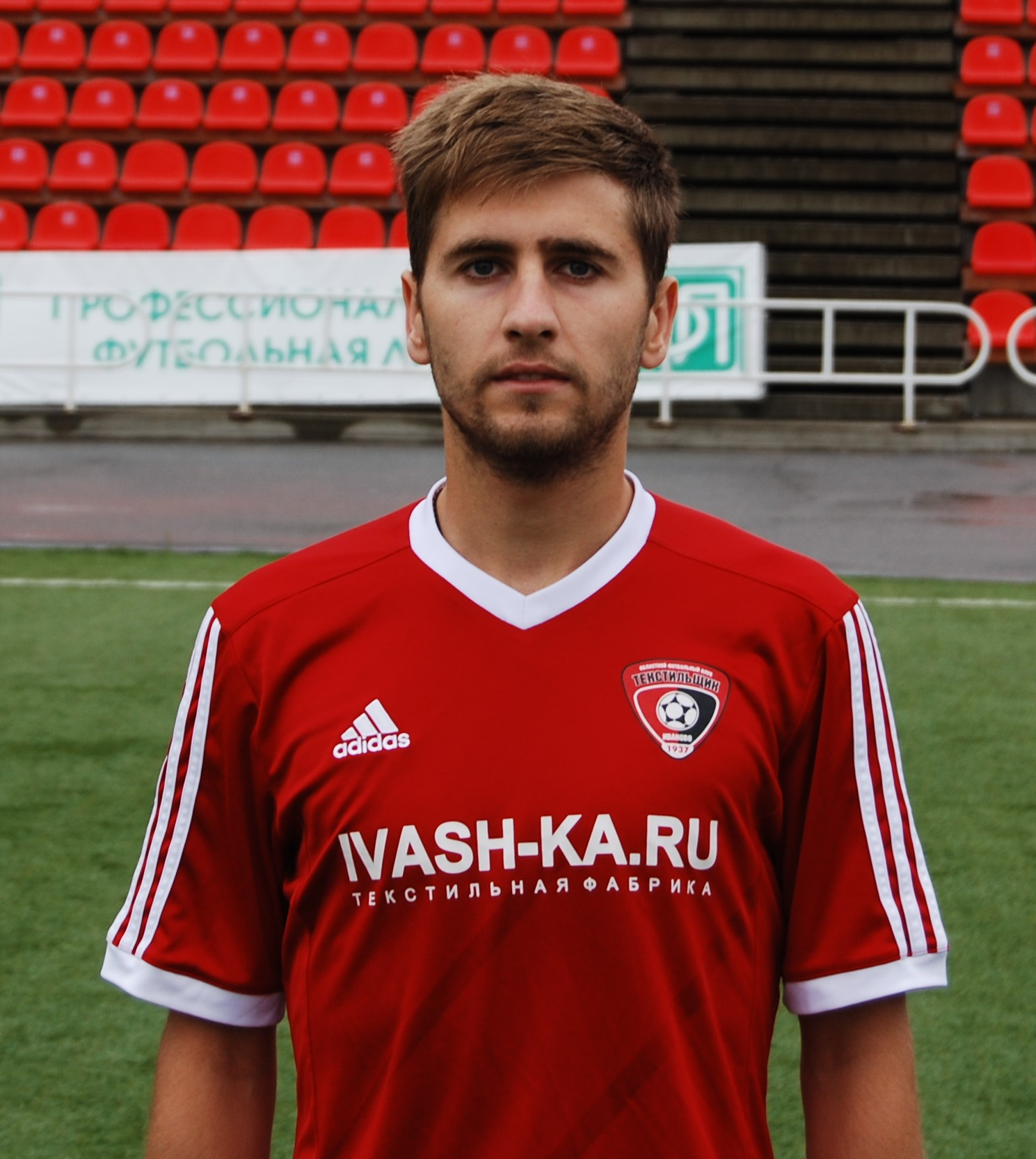

Personal information
- Full name: Maksim Andreyevich Zimarev
- Date of birth: 8 November 1989 (age 36)
- Place of birth: Vladimir, Russian SFSR
- Height: 1.79 m (5 ft 10 in)
- Position: Midfielder

Senior career*
Years	Team	Apps	(Gls)
2008–2012	FC Torpedo Vladimir	107	(3)
2012–2013	FC Tyumen	28	(4)
2013–2015	FC Torpedo Vladimir	60	(15)
2015–2018	FC Tekstilshchik Ivanovo	58	(12)
2018–2021	FC Murom	57	(8)
- * Club domestic league appearances and goals

Maksim Andreyevich Zimarev (Russian: Максим Андреевич Зимарев; born 8 November 1989) is a Russian former professional football player.

== Club career ==
He made his Russian Football National League debut for FC Torpedo Vladimir on 4 April 2011 in a game against FC Alania Vladikavkaz.
