= Ivan Lukyanov (footballer) =

Russian footballer

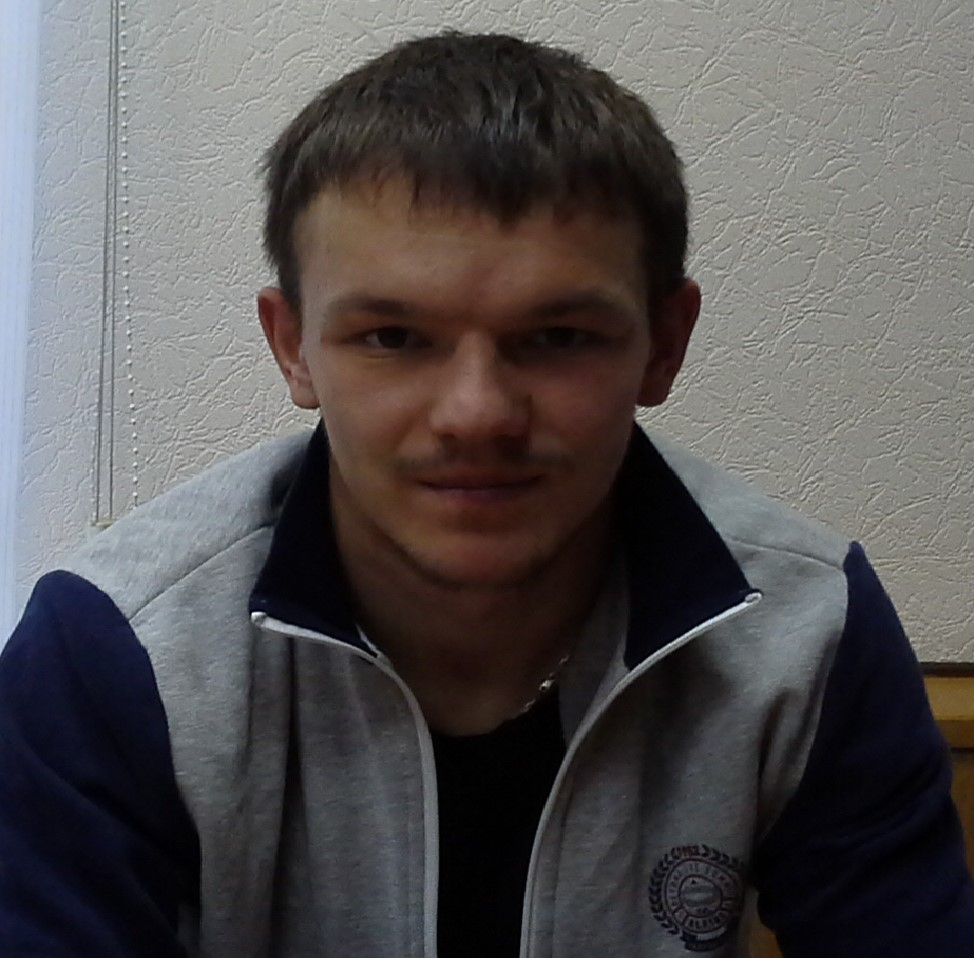

Personal information
- Full name: Ivan Ananyevich Lukyanov
- Date of birth: 27 December 1990 (age 35)
- Place of birth: Mikryakovo, Russian SFSR
- Height: 1.79 m (5 ft 10 in)
- Position: Striker

Senior career*
Years	Team	Apps	(Gls)
2010–2012	FC KAMAZ Naberezhnye Chelny	32	(6)
2013	FC Tyumen	10	(2)
2013–2015	FC Tekstilshchik Ivanovo	61	(24)
2015–2016	FC Volga Nizhny Novgorod	27	(0)
2016–2018	FC Mordovia Saransk	42	(0)
2018–2019	FC Chernomorets Novorossiysk	10	(3)
2019–2020	FC Luki-Energiya Velikiye Luki	1	(1)
2021	FC Amkar Perm	13	(1)
2022	FC Kaluga	9	(4)
- * Club domestic league appearances and goals

Ivan Ananyevich Lukyanov (Russian: Иван Ананьевич Лукьянов; born 27 December 1990) is a Russian former football player.

== Club career ==
He made his professional debut for FC KAMAZ Naberezhnye Chelny on 4 April 2011 in a Russian Football National League game against FC Luch-Energiya Vladivostok.
