= Oleg Dmitrenko =

Russian footballer

Personal information
- Full name: Oleg Petrovich Dmitrenko
- Date of birth: 20 July 1984 (age 42)
- Height: 1.83 m (6 ft 0 in)
- Position: Midfielder

Senior career*
| Years | Team | Apps | (Gls) |
| 2001 | FC SKA-Yunost Rossii Smolensk | | |
| 2002 | FC Kristall-SKA MVO Smolensk | | |
| 2003 | FC Dynamo-D Bryansk | | |
| 2004 | FC Lokomotiv Kaluga | 13 | (0) |
| 2005–2006 | FC Dynamo Bryansk | 13 | (0) |
| 2006 | FC Nara-Desna Naro-Fominsk | 19 | (4) |
| 2007 | DYuSSh Dynamo Bryansk | | |
| 2008 | FC Lokomotiv Liski | 13 | (0) |
| 2009 | FC Bezhitsa Bryansk | | |
| 2010 | FC Gornyak Uchaly | 9 | (0) |
| 2010–2011 | FC Dynamo Barnaul | 35 | (3) |
| 2012–2013 | FC Sakhalin Yuzhno-Sakhalinsk | 30 | (2) |
| 2013–2015 | FC Dynamo Bryansk | 57 | (8) |
- * Club domestic league appearances and goals

Oleg Petrovich Dmitrenko (Russian: Олег Петрович Дмитренко; born 20 July 1984) is a former Russian professional football player.

== Club career ==
He played two seasons in the Russian Football National League for FC Dynamo Bryansk.
