= Nikita Zhdankin =

Russian footballer

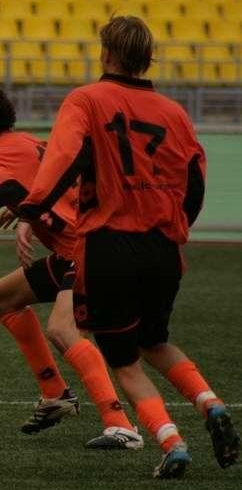

Personal information
- Full name: Nikita Alekseyevich Zhdankin
- Date of birth: 13 October 1989 (age 37)
- Place of birth: Chelyabinsk, Russian SFSR
- Height: 1.87 m (6 ft 2 in)
- Positions: Forward; midfielder

Youth career
- SDYuShOR-3 Chelyabinsk

Senior career*
Years	Team	Apps	(Gls)
2007	FC Zenit Chelyabinsk	25	(3)
2008	FC Ural Sverdlovsk Oblast	32	(3)
2009	FC Chelyabinsk	28	(4)
2010	FC Krasnodar	0	(0)
2010	→ FC Gazovik Orenburg (loan)	8	(0)
2011–2012	FC Gazovik Orenburg	22	(1)
2012–2013	FC Volga Ulyanovsk	16	(3)
2014–2015	FC Ryazan	26	(15)
2015–2016	FC Solyaris Moscow	24	(5)
2016–2017	FC Ryazan	19	(7)
2017–2019	FC Chelyabinsk	13	(1)
- * Club domestic league appearances and goals

Nikita Alekseyevich Zhdankin (Russian: Никита Алексеевич Жданкин; born 13 October 1989) is a Russian former professional football player.

== Club career ==
He played two seasons in the Russian Football National League for FC Ural Sverdlovsk Oblast and FC Gazovik Orenburg.
