= Mikhail Tynyany =

Russian footballer

Personal information
- Full name: Mikhail Yuryevich Tynyany
- Date of birth: 22 May 1989 (age 37)
- Place of birth: Novaya Lyada, Tambov Oblast, Russian SFSR
- Height: 1.72 m (5 ft 7 1/2 in)
- Position: Forward

Youth career
- DYuSSh-4 Tambov

Senior career*
Years	Team	Apps	(Gls)
2006–2007	FC Spartak Tambov	61	(10)
2008–2009	FC KAMAZ Naberezhnye Chelny	1	(0)
2008	→ FC Gornyak Uchaly (loan)	11	(3)
2009	→ FC Spartak Tambov (loan)	30	(6)
2010–2011	FC Torpedo Moscow	10	(0)
2011–2013	FC Spartak Tambov	46	(20)
2013–2016	FC Tambov	70	(17)
2017	FC Uvarovo		
- * Club domestic league appearances and goals

Mikhail Yuryevich Tynyany (Russian: Михаил Юрьевич Тыняный; born 22 May 1989) is a former Russian professional football player.

== Club career ==
He played 3 seasons in the Russian Football National League for FC KAMAZ Naberezhnye Chelny, FC Torpedo Moscow and FC Tambov.
