= Ilya Spitsyn =

Russian footballer

Personal information
- Full name: Ilya Vyacheslavovich Spitsyn
- Date of birth: 6 November 1987 (age 39)
- Place of birth: Voronezh, Russian SFSR
- Height: 1.78 m (5 ft 10 in)
- Position: Midfielder

Youth career
- 1984–2002: FC Fakel Voronezh
- 2003–2005: FC FCS-73 Voronezh

Senior career*
Years	Team	Apps	(Gls)
2005	FC Dynamo Voronezh (amateur)		
2006	FC Fakel Voronezh	0	(0)
2007	FC Trud Voronezh		
2008	FC Lokomotiv Liski	3	(0)
2009	FC FSA Voronezh	24	(3)
2010	FC Fakel Voronezh	13	(1)
2011	FC Khimik Rossosh		
2012	FC Zvezda Ryazan	8	(0)
2013–2017	FC Tambov	89	(9)
- * Club domestic league appearances and goals

Ilya Vyacheslavovich Spitsyn (Russian: Илья́ Вячесла́вович Спи́цын; born 6 November 1987) is a former Russian professional football player.

== Club career ==
He played in the Russian Football National League for FC Tambov in the 2016–17 season.
