= Eldar Mamedov (footballer) =

Russian footballer

Personal information
- Full name: Eldar Ragib Ogly Mamedov
- Date of birth: 5 January 1990 (age 36)
- Place of birth: Omsk, Russian SFSR
- Height: 1.78 m (5 ft 10 in)
- Positions: Midfielder; striker

Youth career
- FC Dynamo Omsk

Senior career*
Years	Team	Apps	(Gls)
2006–2010	FC Krasnodar-2000	89	(15)
2010	→ FC Irtysh Omsk (loan)	11	(0)
2011	FC Gubkin	5	(0)
2011	Sumgayit FK	12	(2)
2012	FC Irtysh Omsk	1	(0)
2013	FC Energiya Volzhsky	10	(1)
2013–2014	FC Olimpia Volgograd	29	(2)
2014	FC Astrakhan	16	(4)
2015	FC Okean Kerch	7	(5)
2015	FC Biolog Novokubansk	4	(0)
- * Club domestic league appearances and goals

Eldar Ragib Ogly Mamedov (Russian: Эльдар Рагиб Оглы Мамедов; born 5 January 1990) is a Russian former professional football player.

== Club career ==
He played one season in the Russian Football National League for FC Irtysh Omsk in 2010.
