= Dmitri Galin =

Russian footballer

Personal information
- Full name: Dmitri Aleksandrovich Galin
- Date of birth: 29 July 1989 (age 37)
- Place of birth: Bratsk, Soviet Union
- Height: 1.77 m (5 ft 9 1/2 in)
- Position: Midfielder

Senior career*
Years	Team	Apps	(Gls)
2006–2013	FC Sibiryak Bratsk	150	(24)
2013–2014	PFC Spartak Nalchik	10	(0)
2014–2016	FC Baikal Irkutsk	26	(9)
2015–2016	→ FC Sakhalin Yuzhno-Sakhalinsk (loan)	17	(3)
- * Club domestic league appearances and goals

Dmitri Aleksandrovich Galin (Russian: Дмитрий Александрович Галин; born 29 July 1989) is a former Russian professional football player.

== Club career ==
He played 3 seasons in the Russian Football National League for PFC Spartak Nalchik and FC Baikal Irkutsk.
