= Almaz Fatikhov =

Russian football player (born 1990)

Personal information
- Full name: Almaz Nazimovich Fatikhov
- Date of birth: 1 May 1990 (age 36)
- Place of birth: Perm, Russian SFSR
- Height: 1.72 m (5 ft 8 in)
- Positions: Midfielder; forward

Senior career*
Years	Team	Apps	(Gls)
2009–2010	FC Oktan Perm (amateur)		
2011	FC Oktan Perm	14	(2)
2011–2017	FC Chita	128	(29)
2017–2018	FC Shinnik Yaroslavl	8	(0)
2018	→ FC Sakhalin Yuzhno-Sakhalinsk (loan)	8	(4)
2018	FC Neftekhimik Nizhnekamsk	5	(2)
2019	FC Kaluga	6	(1)
2019–2020	FC Sakhalin Yuzhno-Sakhalinsk	12	(1)
2020–2021	FC Chita	19	(1)
2021–2022	FC Metallurg Vidnoye	19	(5)
2023	FC Balashikha	9	(2)
- * Club domestic league appearances and goals

Almaz Nazimovich Fatikhov (Russian: Алмаз Назимович Фатихов; born 1 May 1990) is a Russian former football player.

== Club career ==
He made his debut in the Russian Second Division for FC Oktan Perm on 24 April 2011 in a game against FC Akademiya Tolyatti.

He made his Russian Football National League debut for FC Shinnik Yaroslavl on 22 July 2017 in a game against FC Rotor Volgograd.
