= Mikhail Biryukov (footballer, born 1987) =

Russian professional football player

Personal information
- Full name: Mikhail Petrovich Biryukov
- Date of birth: 15 March 1987 (age 39)
- Place of birth: Krivyanskaya, Rostov Oblast, Russian SFSR
- Height: 1.78 m (5 ft 10 in)
- Position: Forward

Senior career*
Years	Team	Apps	(Gls)
2008	FC Taganrog	29	(3)
2009	FC MITOS Novocherkassk (amateur)		
2009	FC SKA Rostov-on-Don	15	(7)
2010	FC Mostovik-Primorye Ussuriysk	26	(1)
2011–2012	FC Astrakhan	34	(19)
2012–2013	FC Ural Sverdlovsk Oblast	10	(1)
2013	FC SKVO Rostov-on-Don	23	(11)
2014	FC Dynamo Saint Petersburg	10	(4)
2014–2017	FC Fakel Voronezh	96	(38)
2017	FC Rotor Volgograd	25	(5)
2018	FC Tambov	9	(2)
2018–2019	FC Fakel Voronezh	37	(4)
2019–2021	FC Tyumen	26	(5)
2021	FC SKA Rostov-on-Don	5	(0)
- * Club domestic league appearances and goals

Mikhail Petrovich Biryukov (Russian: Михаил Петрович Бирюков; born 15 March 1987) is a Russian former professional football player.

== Club career ==
He made his Russian Football National League debut for FC Ural Yekaterinburg on 22 August 2012 in a game against FC Salyut Belgorod.
