= FC Podolye Podolsky district =

Russian football club

FC Podolye Chekhov
- Full name: Football Club Podolye Podolsky district
- Founded: 1996 (as Podolye Podolsky district), 2023 (as Podolye Chekhov)
- Dissolved: 2015
- Ground: Podolye Stadium, Yerino
- Capacity: 1,432
- League: Russian Professional Football League, Zone Center
- 2014–15: 12th

FC Podolye Chekhov (Russian: «ФК Подолье» Подольский район) is a Russian football team from Chekhovsky urban okrug (later Moscow), founded in 1996 and refounded in 2023. It played professionally in the third-tier Russian Professional Football League from 2011 to 2012 season to 2014–15 season, after which it was dissolved due to debts to tax authorities.

== Historical team names and home cities ==
- 1996–2001: FC Podolye Klimovsk
- 2002–2004: FC Podolye Podolsk
- 2005–2009: FC Podolye Voronovo
