= Igor Boyarov =

Russian footballer

Personal information
- Full name: Igor Yuryevich Boyarov
- Date of birth: 31 July 1991 (age 35)
- Height: 1.71 m (5 ft 7 in)
- Position: Forward

Youth career
- Rinat Dasayev RFA Moscow

Senior career*
Years	Team	Apps	(Gls)
2010	FC Sportakademklub Moscow	13	(0)
2011–2014	FC Vityaz Podolsk	111	(28)
2015	FC Sokol Saratov	11	(0)
2015–2016	FC Vityaz Podolsk	18	(2)
2016	FC Torpedo Moscow	11	(0)
- * Club domestic league appearances and goals

Igor Yuryevich Boyarov (Russian: Игорь Юрьевич Бояров; born 31 July 1991) is a former Russian professional football player.

== Club career ==
He made his Russian Football National League debut for FC Sokol Saratov on 14 March 2015 in a game against FC Sakhalin Yuzhno-Sakhalinsk. That was his only season in the FNL.
