= FC Pskov-747 =

Russian football club

- Full name: Football Club Pskov-747
- Founded: 2006
- Dissolved: 2020
- Ground: Lokomotiv Stadium
- Capacity: 3,010
- Owner: Yekaterina Sevastyanova (51%) / Pskov Oblast (49%)
- Chairman: Alexey Sevastyanov
- Manager: Igor Vasilyev
- 2019–20: Russian Professional Football League, Zone West, 9th
- Website: http://pskov-747.ru/
Home colours

FC Pskov-747 (Russian: ФК «Псков-747») was an association football club from Pskov, Russia, founded in 2006. It played in the Russian Professional Football League. Before that Pskov was represented in the Russian professional leagues by FC Mashinostroitel Pskov — which was also named FC Elektron Pskov (1970), FC Pskov (1998–2000) and FC Pskov-2000 (2001–2005). FC Pskov-747 was known as SC 747 Pskov in 2006 and 2007.

The club was owned by the Sevastyanov family. Alexey Sevastyanov, the club founder is owner of the Avto-Alians-747 group of companies. 747 being a favourite number of his.

It dropped out of the PFL before the 2020–21 season. Their best result was 2nd place in Zone West of the Russian Second Division in 2012–12 season.
