= FC Sochi 2013 =

Russian football club

FC Sochi
- Full name: Football Club Sochi
- Founded: 2013
- Dissolved: 2017
- Ground: Sochi Central Stadium
- Capacity: 10,200
- 2016–17: Russian Professional Football League, Zone South, 7th
- Website: http://www.sochi-fc.ru/
| Home colours | Away colours |

FC Sochi (Russian: ФК «Сочи») was a Russian football team based in Sochi. It was founded in 2013.

In the 2013–14 season, the team played commercial tournaments in Abkhazia on the Chernomorsom coast of Russia and neighboring countries before the 2014 Olympic Games in Sochi.

In the 2014–15 season, the team advanced to the professional level, the third-tier Russian Professional Football League. It came in last place during that season and was relegated back to the amateur levels. It returned to the PFL for the 2016–17 season. On 22 June 2017, the club announced that it would be "taking a one-year break to change strategy and to refurbish the stadium" and would not play at the professional level in the 2017–18 season.
