= FC Vityaz Krymsk =

Russian football club

- Full name: Football Club Vityaz Krymsk
- Founded: 1994
- Dissolved: 2015
- Ground: Gigant Stadium
- Capacity: 3000
- 2014–15: Russian Professional Football League, Zone South, 2nd
Home colours	Away colours

FC Vityaz Krymsk (Russian: ФК «Витязь» Крымск) was a Russian football club from Krymsk, Krasnodar Krai, founded in 1994. It played professionally in the Russian Second Division from 1999 to 2005, playing on amateur level in other years. In 2013 club was brought back to professional level and started playing in 2nd Division again, they finished 2013–2014 season with respectable 3rd place, the best achievement so far. In 2014–15 season, they surpassed that, coming in 2nd in their zone. Before the 2015–16 season, the club did not pass professional licensing.

== Club name history ==
- 1994–1995: FC Zarya Krymsk
- 1996–2005: FC Vityaz Krymsk
- 2006–2013: FC Zarya Krymsk
- 2013–2015: FC Vityaz Krymsk
