= FC Kolomna =

Russian football club

- Full name: Football Club Kolomna
- Founded: 1906
- Ground: Avangard Stadium
- Capacity: 8,400
- Owner: Kolomna
- Chairman: Maksim Vesyolkin
- Manager: Aleksandr Kuranov
- League: Russian Amateur Football League
- 2025: Russian Second League, Division B, Group 2, 15th (relegated)
- Website: http://kolomna-fc.ru/

FC Kolomna (Russian: ФК «Коломна») is a Russian football team from Kolomna.

== History ==
FC Kolomna was founded in 1906, from a merger of two Kolomna teams, FC Oka and FC Avangard-Kortek. They played professionally from 1997 to 2002, and again beginning in the 2013–14 season. Their best result was 2nd place in the Center Zone of the Russian Third League in 1999. In 1997, there were two clubs called FC Kolomna, one competed in the Russian Third League and another in the Amateur Football League.

Kolomna was relegated from national-tier Second League Division B at the end of the 2025 season.

== Notable players ==
Had international caps for their respective countries. Players whose name is listed in bold represented their countries while playing for Kolomna.

Russia/USSR

- (Soviet Union) Eduard Malofeyev

Former USSR countries

- (Tajikistan) Umed Alidodov
- (Tajikistan) Alier Ashurmamadov
- (Tajikistan) Evgeniy Liferov
- (Tajikistan) Sergey Piskaryov
- (Tajikistan) Akhmed Yengurazov
- (Turkmenistan) Aleksey Kozlov
