= FC Baikal Irkutsk =

Russian football club

Baikal Irkutsk
- Full name: Football Club Baikal Irkutsk
- Founded: 2009
- Ground: Lokomotiv Stadium (Irkutsk)
- Capacity: 3,231
- Owner: Yekaterina Skripunkova
- Chairman: Oleg Lidrik
- Manager: Vacant
- League: N/A
- 2015–16: FNL 19th (Relegated)
Home colours	Away colours

FC Baikal Irkutsk (Russian: ФК Байкал Иркутск) was a Russian football team from Irkutsk, founded in 2009. It was relegated from the second-tier FNL back to PFL at the end of the 2015–16 season, but it did not receive a professional license for the 2016–17 season and thus folded, with its spot taken by FC Zenit Irkutsk. It was called FC Radian-Baikal Irkutsk before June 2012. In 2015, Baikal's promotion to the Russian National Football League marked the return to the second level of Russian football by a club from Irkutsk after seven years.

== History ==
=== League and cup history ===
Season	League									Russian Cup	Top goalscorer		Managers
Season	Div.	Pos.	Pl.	W	D	L	GS	GA	P	Russian Cup	Name	League	Managers
2010	3rd East	2	30	17	5	8	56	43	56	Fifth round	(Russia) Vladimir Nakhanovich	11	
2011–12	3rd East	7	36	13	13	10	42	37	52	Fifth round	(Russia) Aleksei Nekrasov / (Russia) Vladimir Nakhanovich	6	
2012–13	3rd East	8	30	8	4	18	36	61	28	Second round	(Russia) Y. Dudikov	12	
2013–14	3rd East	5	24	9	9	6	31	20	36	First round	(Russia) Aleksei Nekrasov	8	
2014–15	3rd East	1	24	11	11	2	37	18	44	Round of 64	(Russia) D. Galin	9	
2015–16	2nd	19	38	8	2	28	29	73	26	Round of 32	(Russia) E. Bogdanov	4	(Russia) Dzutsev / (Russia) Petrenko

== Final management and staff ==
- President: Oleg Lydry
- CEO: Vadim Vdovichenko
- Head coach: Dmitry Petrenko
- Assistant coach: Vyacheslav Rudakov Yurevych
- Goalkeeper coach: Sergey Barkalov
- Media officer: Michael Alekseevych Klimov

== See also ==
- FC Zenit Irkutsk
