= FC Syzran-2003 =

Russian football club

- Full name: Football Club Syzran-2003
- Founded: 2003
- Dissolved: 2019
- Ground: Kristall Stadium
- Capacity: 2,070
- Chairman: Vacant
- Manager: Vacant
- League: TBA
- 2018–19: PFL, Zone Ural-Privolzhye, 3rd
Home colours

FC Syzran-2003 (Russian: ФК «Сызрань-2003») is a Russian football club from Syzran, founded in 2003. It played its first professional season in the Russian Second Division in 2011.

On 15 June 2016, the club announced that will not participate in the professional-level competitions in the 2016–17 season. However, on 29 June 2016 the club received the professional license for the season.

On 21 June 2018 it was announced that FC Syzran-2003 is dissolved because of financial problems. But on 1 July it was officially confirmed that FC Syzran-2003 will participate in the 2018–19 Russian Professional Football League (it ended the season in 3rd place). It decided not to participate professionally in the 2019–20 season.
