= FC Novokuznetsk =

Russian football club

Novokuznetsk
- Full name: Football Club; Novokuznetsk
- Nicknames: Kuznya, MetKuz
- Founded: 1946; 80 years ago
- Ground: Metallurg Stadium, Novokuznetsk
- Capacity: 8,500
- League: Amateur
- PFL, 2015–16: Dropped out
Home colours	Away colours

FC Novokuznetsk (Russian: ФК Новокузнецк) is a Russian football club from Novokuznetsk.

== Recent history ==
MKN were relegated to the Russian Second Division after an 18th-place finish in 2005, and only finished 2nd in the "East" region, thus keeping them down another season. However, Lada Togliatti and Dinamo Makhachkala were denied licences for the First Division and thus also relegated. This, alongside the bankruptcy of Angusht Nazran, pushed Metallurg up alongside other second-place finishers SKA Rostov-na-Donu and Mordovia Saransk.

In 2012/13 season, playing as FC Metallurg-Kuzbass Novokuznetsk in the second level (Russian National Football League), it dropped out of the competition due to financial difficulties. It won its zone in the Amateur Football League in the 2013/14 season and advanced to the third-tier Russian Professional Football League for the 2014/15 season. It also was renamed back to FC Metallurg for that season. Before the 2015/16 season it was renamed once more, to FC Novokuznetsk. During the winter break of the 2015/16 season, it dropped out of the PFL and moved to the amateur competitions due to lack of financing.

== Team colours ==
MKN's home kit features green shirts, white shorts and green socks.

== Former players ==
- Aleksandr Kochnev

== Team name history ==
- 1946–1961: FC Metallurg Stalinsk (Novokuznetsk was called Stalinsk)
- 1961–1980: FC Metallurg Novokuznetsk
- 1980–1982: FC ZAPSIBovets Novokuznetsk
- 1982–1995: FC Metallurg Novokuznetsk
- 1995–1998: FC Metallurg-ZAPSIB Novokuznetsk
- 1998–2001: FC Metallurg Novokuznetsk
- 2001–2003: FC Metallurg-ZAPSIB Novokuznetsk
- 2003–2013: FC Metallurg-Kuzbass Novokuznetsk
- 2013–2015: FC Metallurg Novokuznetsk
- 2015–: FC Novokuznetsk
