= 2013–14 FC Alania Vladikavkaz season =

Russian football club season

Alania Vladikavkaz are a Russian Football club which are based in Vladikavkaz. during the 2013-14 campaign they competed in the Russian National Football League, Russian Cup.

== Russian National Football League ==
7 July 2013 Match 1	Ufa	2 - 1	Alania Vladikavkaz	Ufa
17:00	Diego Carlos 39'; Valikayev 55' (yellow card) 56'; Danilov (yellow card) 57'	Summary	Takazov (yellow card) 20'; Gabulov 22'; Khadartsev (yellow card) 44'; Bressan (yellow card) 51'; Grigoryev (yellow card) 71'; Bairyyev (yellow card) 85'	Stadium: Dynamo Stadium; Attendance: 4,000; Referee: (Russia) Vladimir Rogulev

13 July 2013 Match 2	Alania Vladikavkaz	1 - 0	Angusht Nazran	Vladikavkaz
18:00	Khadartsev 35' (yellow card) 37'; Takazov (yellow card) 45'	Summary	Guz (yellow card) 31'; Albakov (yellow card) 48' (yellow-red card)	Stadium: Republican Spartak Stadium; Attendance: 2,700; Referee: (Russia) Igor Fedotov

18 July 2013 Match 3	Neftekhimik Nizhnekamsk	1 - 2	Alania Vladikavkaz	Nizhnekamsk
18:00	Mirzaev 28'; Kambolov (yellow card) 69'	Summary	Grigoryev 39'; Tsarikayev 51'; Takazov (yellow card) 90'	Stadium: Neftekhimik Stadium; Attendance: 1,400; Referee: (Russia) Kirill Levnikov

23 July 2013 Match 4	Spartak Nalchik	1 - 1	Alania Vladikavkaz	Nalchik
19:00	Suslov (yellow card) 20'; Carlos Rúa 57'	Summary	Danilo Neco 51'; Bairyyev (yellow card) 82'; Grigoryev (yellow card) 90'	Stadium: Spartak Stadium; Attendance: 3,000; Referee: (Russia) Alexey Nikolaev

2 August 2013 Match 5	Baltika Kaliningrad	0 - 1	Alania Vladikavkaz	Kaliningrad
20:00	Salnikov (yellow card) 23'; Stotskiy (yellow card) 23'; Zimulka (yellow card) 88'	Summary	Gabulov 24' (pen.); Khadartsev (yellow card) 32'; Grigoryev (yellow card) 57'; Bairyyev (yellow card) 70'	Stadium: Baltika Stadium; Attendance: 8,300; Referee: (Russia) Sergey Ivanov

7 August 2013 Match 6	Alania Vladikavkaz	0 - 0	Luch-Energiya Vladivostok	Vladikavkaz
18:00	Danilo Neco (yellow card) 45'; Pliyev (yellow card) 70'; Šemberas (yellow card) 90'	Summary	Ponomarenko (yellow card) 34'; Romanovich (yellow card) 37'; Kolychev (yellow card) 63'; Tetrashvili (yellow card) 78'; Katsayev (yellow card) 90'	Stadium: Republican Spartak Stadium; Attendance: 5,000; Referee: (Russia) Vyacheslav Kharlamov

12 August 2013 Match 7	Salyut Belgorod	0 - 1	Alania Vladikavkaz	Belgorod
19:00	Afonin (yellow card) 22' (yellow-red card); Tsukanov (yellow card) 39'; Semyonov (red card) 54'; Butyrin (yellow card) 75'	Summary	Takazov (yellow card) 30'; Šemberas (yellow card) 71'; Danilo Neco 75'; Gogichayev (yellow card) 83'; Khaymanov (yellow card) 89' (yellow-red card)	Stadium: Salyut Stadium; Attendance: 4,800; Referee: (Russia) Timur Arslanbekov

18 August 2013 Match 8	Alania Vladikavkaz	2 - 1	Rotor Volgograd	Vladikavkaz
18:00	Tskhovrebov 11'; Pliyev (yellow card) 27'; Martsvaladze 50'; Butuyev (yellow card) 90'	Summary	Arkhipov 59'	Stadium: Republican Spartak Stadium; Attendance: 4,000; Referee: (Russia) Vladimir Moskalyov

23 August 2013 Match 9	Torpedo Moscow	2 - 0	Alania Vladikavkaz	Moscow
19:00	Steklov (yellow card) 12'; Shevchenko 25' (yellow card) 55'; Svezhov (yellow card) 48'; Aydov 68' (pen.)	Summary	Bairyyev (yellow card) 23' (yellow-red card); Dudiyev (yellow card) 43'; Khomich (yellow card) 64'; Martsvaladze (yellow card) 67'; Gabulov (yellow card) 76'; Khadartsev (yellow card) 84'	Stadium: Eduard Streltsov Stadium; Attendance: 1,100; Referee: (Russia) Vladimir Seldyakov

28 August 2013 Match 10	Alania Vladikavkaz	2 - 0	Arsenal Tula	Vladikavkaz
19:00	Martsvaladze 29'; Gabulov 45'; Khomich (yellow card) 76'; Šemberas (yellow card) 90'	Summary		Stadium: Republican Spartak Stadium; Attendance: 7,500; Referee: (Russia) Kirill Levnikov

5 September 2013 Match 11	Mordovia Saransk	0 - 0	Alania Vladikavkaz	Saransk
18:00	Perendija (yellow card) 20'; Budnikov (yellow card) 37'	Summary	Pliyev (yellow card) 81'	Stadium: Start Stadium; Attendance: 4,000; Referee: (Russia) Aleksei Matyunin

10 September 2013 Match 12	Alania Vladikavkaz	3 - 1	Dynamo Saint Petersburg	Vladikavkaz
20:00	Martsvaladze 9'; Gabulov (yellow card) 21' (goal) 83' (pen.); Khozin 65'; Goore (yellow card) 75'	Summary	Akimov 81'; Kulesha (yellow card) 83'	Stadium: Republican Spartak Stadium; Attendance: 6,000; Referee: (Russia) Denis Shpilev

16 September 2013 Match 13	FC Sibir Novosibirsk	1 - 1	Alania Vladikavkaz	Novosibirsk
17:00	Bazanov 20' (yellow card) 30'	Summary	Gabulov (yellow card) 30'; Khadartsev (yellow card) 70'; Goore (yellow card) 86'; Dudiyev 90'; Bairyyev (yellow card) 90'	Stadium: Spartak Stadium; Attendance: 3,100; Referee: (Russia) Mikhail Belov

22 September 2013 Match 14	Alania Vladikavkaz	2 - 1	Yenisey Krasnoyarsk	Vladikavkaz
19:00	Gabulov 13' (pen.); Khadartsev 36'; Zaytsev (yellow card) 53'; Šemberas (yellow card) 84'	Summary	Magadiyev (yellow card) 13'; Marushchak 54'; Lebamba (yellow card) 64'; Leshonok (yellow card) 75'; Ryzhov (yellow card) 75'	Stadium: Republican Spartak Stadium; Attendance: 4,500; Referee: (Russia) Vyacheslav Popov

1 October 2013 Match 15	SKA-Energiya Khabarovsk	0 - 1	Alania Vladikavkaz	Khabarovsk
10:00	Udaly (yellow card) 28'	Summary	Khojava (yellow card) 39'; Gabulov 44'; Butuyev (yellow card) 76'; Goore (yellow card) 90'	Stadium: Lenin Stadium; Attendance: 2,500; Referee: (Russia) Roman Galimov

7 October 2013 Match 16	Alania Vladikavkaz	3 - 0	FC Gazovik Orenburg	Vladikavkaz
19:00	Priskin 22', 44', 49'	Summary	Vukobratović (yellow card) 69'	Stadium: Republican Spartak Stadium; Attendance: 4,000; Referee: (Russia) Sergey Kostevich

13 October 2013 Match 17	Shinnik Yaroslavl	1 - 0	Alania Vladikavkaz	Yaroslavl
15:00	Maloyan (yellow card) 30'; Deobald (yellow card) 68'; Karytska 78'	Summary		Stadium: Shinnik Stadium; Attendance: 3,400; Referee: (Russia) Vladimir Seldyakov

18 October 2013 Match 18	Alania Vladikavkaz	4 - 0	FC Khimik Dzerzhinsk	Vladikavkaz
18:00	Bairyyev (yellow card) 15'; Bakayev (yellow card) 38'; Khozin 54'; Priskin 72'; Tskhovrebov (yellow card) 83'; Islam Mashukov 89'; Gabulov 90+1'	Summary	Pashtov (yellow card) 18'	Stadium: Republican Spartak Stadium; Attendance: 8,000; Referee: (Russia) Maxim Layushkin

23 October 2013 Match 19	Angusht Nazran	1 - 0	Alania Vladikavkaz	Nazran
15:00	Guguyev 77' (yellow card) 83'; Akhilgov (yellow card) 81'	Summary	Tskhovrebov (yellow card) 21'; Dudiyev (yellow card) 31'	Stadium: Rashid Aushev Central Stadium; Attendance: 3,000; Referee: (Russia) Vladimir Moskalyov

27 October 2013 Match 20	Alania Vladikavkaz	2 - 1	FC Neftekhimik Nizhnekamsk	Vladikavkaz
16:00	Priskin 17', 54'; Khadartsev (yellow card) 39'	Summary	Nurov (yellow card) 70' (yellow-red card); Dzhalilov 74'; Losev (yellow card) 89'	Stadium: Republican Spartak Stadium; Attendance: 6,000; Referee: (Russia) Aleksey Sukhoy

3 November 2013 Match 21	Alania Vladikavkaz	1 - 0	PFC Spartak Nalchik	Vladikavkaz
16:00	Bairyyev (yellow card) 31'; Goore (yellow card) 54'; Priskin 70'; Šemberas (yellow card) 81'; Khozin (yellow card) 84'; Zaytsev (yellow card) 90'	Summary	Siradze (yellow card) 31'; Averyanov (yellow card) 63'; Medvedev (yellow card) 72'; Goshokov (yellow card) 90'	Stadium: Republican Spartak Stadium; Attendance: 5,000; Referee: (Russia) Sergey Smirnov

17 November 2013 Match 22	Alania Vladikavkaz	1 - 0	Baltika	Vladikavkaz
17:00	Khozin 78' (yellow card) 88'; Bairyyev (yellow card) 81'; Islam Mashukov (yellow card) 84'; Grigoryev (yellow card) 90'	Summary	Sysuyev (yellow card) 72'; Gatsko (yellow card) 78'; Sheliya (yellow card) 78'	Stadium: Republican Spartak Stadium; Attendance: 3,000; Referee: (Russia) Evgeny Turbin

23 November 2013 Match 23	Luch-Energiya Vladivostok	3 - 0	Alania Vladikavkaz	Vladivostok
09:00		Summary		Stadium: Dynamo Stadium

8 March 2014 Match 24	Rotor Volgograd	-	Alania Vladikavkaz	Volgograd
				Stadium: Central Stadium

15 March 2014 Match 25	Alania Vladikavkaz	0 - 3	Salyut Belgorod	Vladikavkaz
				Stadium: Republican Spartak Stadium

22 March 2014 Match 26	Alania Vladikavkaz	0 - 3	Torpedo Moscow	Vladikavkaz
				Stadium: Republican Spartak Stadium

29 March 2014 Match 27	Arsenal Tula	3 - 0	Alania Vladikavkaz	Tula, Russia
				Stadium: Arsenal Stadium
