= 2012–13 FC Alania Vladikavkaz season =

Alania
2012–13 season
- Chairman: Valery Gazzaev
- Manager: Vladimir Gazzayev
- Stadium: Republican Spartak Stadium
- Russian Premier League: 16th (Relegated)
- Russian Cup: Round of 32 vs Tyumen
- Top goalscorer: League: Danilo Neco (9); All: Danilo Neco (9)
- Highest home attendance: 28,500 vs Spartak; 21 July 2012
- Lowest home attendance: 5,000 vs Dynamo Moscow; 19 May 2013
- Average home league attendance: 12,873
Home colours	Away colours	Third colours

The 2012–13 Alania season was their 1st season back in the Russian Premier League, the highest tier of association football in Russia, after relegation during the 2010 Russian Premier League season. It will be their 16th season overall in the top flight. Alania also participated in the 2012–13 Russian Cup, getting knocked out at the Round of 32 stage by FC Tyumen.

== Squad ==
As of 1 March 2013

Note: Flags indicate national team as defined under FIFA eligibility rules; some limited exceptions apply. Players may hold more than one non-FIFA nationality.

No.	Pos.	Nation	Player
1	GK	RUS	Dmitri Khomich
2	DF	RUS	Vladimir Khozin
3	DF	RUS	Zaurbek Pliyev
4	DF	RUS	Aslan Dudiyev
5	DF	GEO	Mamuka Kobakhidze
7	MF	RUS	Georgi Gabulov
8	MF	RUS	Mikhail Bakayev
9	MF	RUS	Arsen Khubulov
10	FW	HUN	Tamás Priskin
11	FW	BRA	Danilo Neco
13	DF	BRA	Welinton (on loan from Flamengo)
15	DF	BIH	Ognjen Vranješ
17	MF	RUS	Taras Tsarikayev (captain)
18	MF	LTU	Deividas Šemberas

No.	Pos.	Nation	Player
19	FW	RUS	Aleksandr Prudnikov
20	DF	CIV	Dacosta Goore
22	FW	ESA	Rodolfo Zelaya
23	DF	RUS	Anton Grigoryev
25	DF	ROU	Ioan Mera
31	MF	BLR	Renan Bressan
35	GK	RUS	Soslan Dzhanayev (on loan from Spartak Moscow)
39	MF	GEO	Giorgi Chanturia (on loan from Vitesse Arnhem)
48	DF	RUS	Azat Bairyyev
49	FW	BRA	Diego Mauricio
66	GK	RUS	Soslanbek Arshiyev
84	MF	BRA	Rudnei
87	MF	NED	Royston Drenthe
92	DF	RUS	Dmitri Tikhiy

=== Out on loan ===
Note: Flags indicate national team as defined under FIFA eligibility rules; some limited exceptions apply. Players may hold more than one non-FIFA nationality.

No.	Pos.	Nation	Player
24	MF	RUS	Roland Gigolayev (at Petrotrest)
32	DF	TOG	Abdoul Mamah (at Dacia Chişinău)

No.	Pos.	Nation	Player
—	FW	NZL	Kosta Barbarouses (at (Greece) Panathinaikos)

=== Youth squad ===
Note: Flags indicate national team as defined under FIFA eligibility rules; some limited exceptions apply. Players may hold more than one non-FIFA nationality.

No.	Pos.	Nation	Player
14	MF	RUS	Zaurbek Kambolov
27	FW	RUS	Dzambolat Khastsayev
33	GK	RUS	Vitali Gudiyev
37	MF	RUS	Batraz Khadartsev
44	DF	RUS	Marat Butuyev
46	DF	RUS	Albert Tskhovrebov
50	FW	RUS	Chermen Tamayev
51	DF	RUS	Aleksandr Kleshchenko
54	MF	RUS	Batradz Kokoev
55	DF	RUS	Georgi Burayev
63	MF	RUS	Kazbek Makiyev
66	GK	RUS	Soslanbek Arshiyev
70	FW	RUS	Taimuraz Karatsev
71	FW	RUS	Taimuraz Toboyev
73	FW	RUS	Marat Khripkov
75	DF	RUS	Oleg Tolmasov

No.	Pos.	Nation	Player
77	DF	RUS	Gia Yeloshvili
78	DF	RUS	Dmitri Griban
79	MF	RUS	David Siukaev
80	MF	RUS	Alan Khabalov
83	MF	RUS	Tamerlan Bazayev
88	MF	RUS	Valeri Dzodzaev
90	GK	RUS	Omar Tsopanov
91	DF	RUS	Alan Tatayev
93	DF	RUS	Yaroslav Zamchalov
94	FW	RUS	Zaurbek Olisayev
95	DF	RUS	Edik Pliyev
96	FW	RUS	Soslan Tsgoyev
97	DF	RUS	Georgi Dzhagmaidze
98	DF	RUS	Igor Khaymanov
99	DF	RUS	Tamerlan Kachmazov

== Transfers ==
=== Summer ===
In: Note: Flags indicate national team as defined under FIFA eligibility rules; some limited exceptions apply. Players may hold more than one non-FIFA nationality.

No.	Pos.	Nation	Player
2	DF	RUS	Vladimir Khozin (from (Russia) Torpedo Moscow)
18	DF	LTU	Deividas Šemberas (from (Russia) CSKA Moscow)
19	FW	RUS	Dmitri Golubov (from (Russia) Dynamo Bryansk)
21	DF	BRA	Carlos Alexandre Cardoso (from (Romania) Pandurii Târgu Jiu)
24	MF	RUS	Roland Gigolayev (from (Russia) Alania-D Vladikavkaz, August 2012)
25	DF	ROU	Ioan Mera (from (Romania) Politehnica Timișoara, previously on loan to (Romania) Unirea Urziceni)
30	MF	GEO	Shota Grigalashvili (from (Georgia (country)) Dila Gori)
37	MF	RUS	Batraz Khadartsev (from (Russia) CSKA Moscow)
44	DF	RUS	Marat Butuyev (from (Russia) FAYUR Beslan)
46	DF	RUS	Albert Tskhovrebov (from (Russia) Alania-D Vladikavkaz)
49	FW	BRA	Diego Maurício (from (Brazil) Flamengo)
50	FW	RUS	Chermen Tamayev
55	DF	RUS	Georgi Burayev
71	FW	RUS	Taimuraz Toboyev
75	DF	RUS	Oleg Tolmasov
77	DF	RUS	Giya Yeloshvili
78	DF	RUS	Dmitry Griban (from (Russia) Alania-D Vladikavkaz)
84	MF	BRA	Rudnei da Rosa (from (Brazil) Cruzeiro)
90	GK	RUS	Omar Tsopanov (from (Russia) Alania-D Vladikavkaz)
91	DF	RUS	Alan Tatayev
93	DF	RUS	Yaroslav Zamchalov
95	DF	RUS	Edik Pliyev
97	DF	RUS	Georgy Dzhagmaidze
98	DF	RUS	Igor Khaymanov (from (Russia) Alania-D Vladikavkaz)
99	DF	RUS	Tamerlan Kachmazov
—	MF	RUS	Aleksandr Gagloyev (end of loan to (Russia) Gazovik Orenburg)

Out: Note: Flags indicate national team as defined under FIFA eligibility rules; some limited exceptions apply. Players may hold more than one non-FIFA nationality.

No.	Pos.	Nation	Player
3	DF	RUS	Soslan Takazov (to (Russia) Alania-D Vladikavkaz)
7	DF	RUS	Roland Gigolayev (to (Russia) Alania-D Vladikavkaz, not later than July 2012)
15	MF	RUS	Aslan Mashukov (to (Russia) Volgar Astrakhan)
18	MF	RUS	Dzhambulad Bazayev (retired)
32	FW	ESA	Rodolfo Zelaya (end of loan from (El Salvador) Alianza)
63	MF	RUS	Kazbek Makiyev
75	MF	UZB	Marat Bikmaev (to (Kazakhstan) Aktobe)
77	FW	NZL	Kosta Barbarouses (on loan to (Greece) Panathinaikos)

=== Winter ===
In: Note: Flags indicate national team as defined under FIFA eligibility rules; some limited exceptions apply. Players may hold more than one non-FIFA nationality.

No.	Pos.	Nation	Player
7	MF	RUS	Georgy Gabulov (from (Russia) Anzhi Makhachkala)
13	DF	BRA	Welinton (loan from (Brazil) Flamengo)
15	DF	BIH	Ognjen Vranješ (from (Russia) FC Krasnodar)
19	FW	RUS	Aleksandr Prudnikov (from (Russia) Kuban Krasnodar)
22	FW	ESA	Rodolfo Zelaya (from (El Salvador) Alianza)
31	MF	BLR	Renan Bressan (from (Belarus) BATE Borisov)
35	GK	RUS	Soslan Dzhanayev (loan from (Russia) Spartak Moscow)
39	MF	GEO	Giorgi Chanturia (loan from (Netherlands) Vitesse Arnhem)
87	MF	NED	Royston Drenthe (from (Spain) Real Madrid)
92	DF	RUS	Dmitri Tikhiy (from (Russia) FC Luch-Energiya Vladivostok)

Out: Note: Flags indicate national team as defined under FIFA eligibility rules; some limited exceptions apply. Players may hold more than one non-FIFA nationality.

No.	Pos.	Nation	Player
6	DF	MDA	Simeon Bulgaru (to (Russia) Volga Nizhny Novgorod)
7	MF	UZB	Sanzhar Tursunov (to (Uzbekistan) Lokomotiv Tashkent)
13	MF	KAZ	Kazbek Geteriev (to (Kazakhstan) Kairat Almaty)
19	FW	RUS	Dmitri Golubov (to (Russia) FC Ufa)
21	DF	BRA	Carlos Cardoso (to (Brazil) Vitória)
30	MF	GEO	Shota Grigalashvili (to (Russia) FC SKA-Energiya Khabarovsk)
36	DF	RUS	Dmitri Grachyov (to (Russia) FC Ufa)

== Friendlies ==
24 June 2012	Alania (Russia)	0 - 0	(Egypt) Al Ahly
		[ Summary]

1 July 2012	Alania (Russia)	2 - 1	(Croatia) Hajduk Split	Germany
	Khubulov 20'; Khozin 35'	[ Summary]	Caktaš 86' (pen.)

== Competitions ==
=== Premier League ===
==== Matches ====
21 July 2012 1	Alania	1 – 2	Spartak	Vladikavkaz
20:00 MSK (UTC+4)	Khubulov 14'	Summary	Emenike 1'; Grigoryev 86' (o.g.)	Stadium: Republican Spartak Stadium; Attendance: 28,500; Referee: Vitaly Meshkov

28 July 2012 2	Rubin	3 – 1	Alania	Kazan
15:00 MSK (UTC+4)	Natcho 18' (pen.), 48'; Dyadyun 90+3'	Summary	Neco 79' (pen.)	Stadium: Central Stadium; Attendance: 8,450; Referee: Sergei Ivanov

4 August 2012 3	Alania	5 – 0	Terek	Vladikavkaz
17:30 MSK (UTC+4)	Neco 7' (pen.), 26'; Priskin 19'; Khozin 34'; Khubulov 90+2'	Summary	Amelchenko (red card) 2'; Ivanov (red card) 67'	Stadium: Republican Spartak Stadium; Attendance: 12,000; Referee: Sergey Lapochkin

11 August 2012 4	Lokomotiv Moscow	2 – 2	Alania	Moscow
17:00 MSK (UTC+4)	Pavlyuchenko 3'; Maicon 33'	Summary	Grigoryev 23'; Priskin 37'; Dudiyev (red card) 83'	Stadium: Lokomotiv Stadium; Attendance: 11,318; Referee: Aleksandr Egorov

20 August 2012 5	Alania	2 – 1	Kuban Krasnodar	Vladikavkaz
20:00 MSK (UTC+4)	Neco 37' (pen.), 61'	Summary	Lolo (yellow card) 26' (yellow-red card) 35'; Dealbert 39'	Stadium: Republican Spartak Stadium; Attendance: 12,000; Referee: Eduard Malyi

25 August 2012 6	Rostov	3 – 1	Alania	Rostov
20:45 MSK (UTC+4)	Holenda 42', 44', 65'; Česnauskis (yellow card) 37' (yellow-red card) 49'	Summary	Neco 1'	Stadium: Olimp - 2 Attendance: 6,200; Referee: Sergey Kuznetsov

1 September 2012 7	Alania	1 – 1	Amkar	Vladikavkaz
20:00MSK (UTC+4)	Priskin 70'	Summary	Ignatovich 35'	Stadium: Republican Spartak Stadium; Attendance: 10,000; Referee: Timur Arslanbekov

16 September 2012 8	CSKA	2 - 0	Alania	Moscow
15:00 MSK (UTC+4)	Honda 49', 85'	Summary	Šemberas (yellow card) 45+1' (yellow-red card) 90+1'	Stadium: Luzhniki Stadium; Attendance: 10,500; Referee: Vladimir Kazmenko

24 September 2012 9	Alania	0 - 1	Anzhi	Vladikavkaz
19:00 MSK (UTC+4)		Summary	Traoré 8'	Stadium: Republican Spartak Stadium; Attendance: 21,500; Referee: Vladislav Bezborodov

1 October 2012 10	Mordovia Saransk	1 - 1	Alania	Saransk
20:00 MSK (UTC+4)	Mukhametshin 38'	Summary	Neco 57'	Stadium: Start Stadium; Attendance: 4,000; Referee: Sergei Ivanov

6 October 2012 11	Alania	2 - 2	Krylia Sovetov	Vladikavkaz
19:00 MSK (UTC+4)	Neco 34', 69'	Summary	Grigoryan 63'; Teles 73'	Stadium: Republican Spartak Stadium; Attendance: 12,500; Referee: Sergey Lapochkin

20 October 2012 12	Krasnodar	2 - 0	Alania	Krasnodar
18:30 MSK (UTC+4)	Shipitsin 71'; Drinčić 88'	Summary		Stadium: Kuban Stadium; Attendance: 7,300; Referee: Igor Nizovtsev

27 October 2012 13	Alania	2 - 3	Zenit	Vladikavkaz
19:30 MSK (UTC+4)	Khozin 34', 44'	Summary	Bystrov 13'; Kerzhakov 71', 88'	Stadium: Republican Spartak Stadium; Attendance: 12,500; Referee: Sergey Aleksandr Kerzhakov

5 November 2012 14	Alania	0 - 2	Volga	Vladikavkaz
19:00 MSK (UTC+4)		Summary	Sapogov 68'; Maksimov 74'	Stadium: Republican Spartak Stadium; Attendance: 8,000; Referee: Alexey Nikolaev

10 November 2012 15	Dynamo	2 - 0	Alania	Moscow
13:30 MSK (UTC+4)	Kurányi 27', 85'	Summary		Stadium: Arena Khimki; Attendance: 3,479; Referee: Aleksandr Egorov

17 November 2012 16	Alania	0 – 2	Rubin	Vladikavkaz
18:30 MSK (UTC+4)		Summary	Marcano 57'; Kasaev 62'	Stadium: Republican Spartak Stadium; Attendance: 8,200; Referee: Sergey Karasev

24 November 2012 17	Terek	1 - 0	Alania	Grozny
14:00 MSK (UTC+4)	Lebedenko 64'	Summary		Stadium: Sultan Bilimkhanov Stadium; Attendance: 20,700; Referee: Alexey Nikolaev

1 December 2012 18	Alania	0 - 1	Lokomotiv Moscow	Vladikavkaz
16:00 MSK (UTC+4)		Summary	Grigoryev 12'	Stadium: Republican Spartak Stadium; Attendance: 7,000; Referee: Vladimir Kazmenko

8 December 2012 19	Kuban Krasnodar	0 - 0	Alania	Krasnodar
14:30 MSK (UTC+4)	Zelão (yellow card) 13' (yellow-red card) 42'; Kozlov (yellow card) 59' (yellow-red card) 80'	Summary	Dudiyev (red card) 88'	Stadium: Kuban Stadium; Attendance: 10,730; Referee: Timur Arslanbekov

9 March 2013 20	Alania	0 - 0	Rostov	Vladikavkaz
18:30 MSK (UTC+4)		Summary		Stadium: Republican Spartak Stadium; Attendance: 15,200; Referee: Sergey Lapochkin

16 March 2013 21	Amkar	5 - 1	Alania	Perm
16:00 MSK (UTC+4)	Kolomeytsev 10'; Jakubko 16', 29'; Vassiljev 90+2' (pen.); Kanunnikov 90+3'	Summary	Vranješ 63'	Stadium: Zvezda Stadium; Attendance: 6,250; Referee: Maxim Layushkin

1 April 2013 22	Alania	0 - 4	CSKA	Vladikavkaz
19:00 MSK (UTC+4)	Welinton (red card) 54'	Summary	Dzagoev 25'; Love 52', 70' (pen.); Doumbia 90+2'	Stadium: Republican Spartak Stadium; Attendance: 20,500; Referee: Aleksandr Egorov

7 April 2013 23	Anzhi	0 - 0	Alania	Makhachkala
17:00 MSK (UTC+4)	Traoré (yellow card) 87'	Summary	Khubulov (yellow card) 18'; Goore (yellow card) 25'; Bakayev (yellow card) 69'; Prudnikov (yellow card) 77'	Stadium: Dynamo Stadium; Attendance: 19,700; Referee: Timur Arslanbekov

15 April 2013 24	Alania	3 - 1	Mordovia Saransk	Vladikavkaz
18:00 MSK (UTC+4)	Drenthe 10' (pen.), 44', 89'; Gabulov (red card) 90+10'	Summary	Mukhametshin 49'; Perendija (red card) 90+10'	Stadium: Republican Spartak Stadium; Attendance: 10,200; Referee: Vitaly Meshkov

20 April 2013 25	Krylia Sovetov	2 - 1	Alania	Samara
16:00 MSK (UTC+4)	Goreux 11'; Angbwa 44'	Summary	Priskin 88'	Stadium: Metallurg Stadium; Attendance: 16,987; Referee: Vladimir Kazmenko

29 April 2013 26	Alania	2 - 3	Krasnodar	Vladikavkaz
18:30 MSK (UTC+4)	Vranješ 61'; Welinton 72'	Summary	Joãozinho 38'; Wánderson 54', 90+3'; Nakhushev (yellow card) 72' (yellow-red card) 75'	Stadium: Republican Spartak Stadium; Attendance: 10,000; Referee: Aleksey Eskov

4 May 2013 27	Zenit	4 - 0	Alania	Saint Petersburg
20:15 MSK (UTC+4)	Hulk 36' (pen.) 64', 72' (yellow card) 65'; Danny (yellow card) 40'; Witsel (yellow card) 44'; Hubočan (yellow card) 66'; Bukharov 88'	Summary	Vranješ (yellow card) 9' (red card) 14'; Grigoryev (yellow card) 18'; Dzhanayev (yellow card) 35'; Priskin (yellow card) 76'	Stadium: Petrovsky Stadium; Attendance: 19,307; Referee: Mikhail Vilkov

11 May 2013 28	Volga	1 - 0	Alania	Nizhny Novgorod
16:00 MSK (UTC+4)	Karyaka 45' (pen.)	Summary	Grigoryev (red card) 18'	Stadium: Lokomotiv Stadium; Attendance: 7,500; Referee: Sergey Lapochkin

19 May 2013 29	Alania	1 - 0	Dynamo	Vladikavkaz
13:30 MSK (UTC+4)	Priskin 71'; Danilo Neco (yellow card) 72' (red card) 88'; Chanturia (red card) 88'	Summary	Dzsudzsák (red card) 88'; Kokorin (red card) 88'	Stadium: Republican Spartak Stadium; Attendance: 5,000; Referee: Sergei Ivanov

26 May 2013 30	Spartak	2 - 0	Alania	Moscow
13:30 MSK (UTC+4)	Bryzgalov 26'; Ananidze 79'	Summary	Goore (red card) 6'	Stadium: Luzhniki Stadium; Attendance: 8,500; Referee: Alexey Nikolaev

==== Table ====
Pos	Team	Pld	W	D	L	GF	GA	GD	Pts	Qualification or relegation
12	Volga Nizhny Novgorod	30	7	8	15	28	46	−18	29 (Note: Amkar Perm ahead of Volga Nizhny Novgorod and Rostov on head-to-head points; Amkar Perm: 7 pts, Volga Nizhny Novgorod: 5 pts, Rostov: 4 pts.)	
13	Rostov (O)	30	7	8	15	30	41	−11	29	Qualification for the Relegation play-offs
14	Krylia Sovetov Samara (O)	30	7	7	16	31	52	−21	28	Qualification for the Relegation play-offs
15	Mordovia Saransk (R)	30	5	5	20	30	57	−27	20	Relegation to Football National League
16	Alania Vladikavkaz (R)	30	4	7	19	26	53	−27	19	Relegation to Football National League

Source: Russian Premier League
Rules for classification: 1) points; 2) number of wins; 3) head-to-head points; 4) number of head-to-head wins; 5) head-to-head goal difference; 6) number of head-to-head goals scored; 7) number of head-to-head away goals scored; 8) goal difference; 9) number of goals scored; 10) number of away goals scored; 11) position in the 2011–12 season (only used until all the regularly scheduled games have been played); 11) extra play-off game or tournament between the teams in question.
(O) Play-off winners; (R) Relegated

=== Russian Cup ===
27 September 2012 Round of 32	Tyumen	2 – 1	Alania Vladikavkaz	Tyumen
16:00 MSK (UTC+4)	Polyakov 3'; Zimarev 28' (pen.); Polyakov (yellow card) 60'	Report	Kleshchenko (yellow card) 27' (yellow-red card) 88'; Butuyev (yellow card) 62'; Mera 71'; Bakayev (yellow card) 88'; Geteriev (yellow card) 90'	Stadium: Geolog Stadium; Attendance: 9,000; Referee: Denis Shpilev

== Squad statistics ==
As of 28 May 2013

=== Appearances and goals ===
No.	Pos	Nat	Player	Total		Premier League		Russian Cup	
No.	Pos	Nat	Player	Apps	Goals	Apps	Goals	Apps	Goals
1	GK	(Russia) RUS	Dmitri Khomich	17	0	17	0	0	0
2	DF	(Russia) RUS	Vladimir Khozin	27	3	24+3	3	0	0
3	DF	(Russia) RUS	Zaurbek Pliyev	20	0	18+2	0	0	0
4	DF	(Russia) RUS	Aslan Dudiyev	18	0	13+5	0	0	0
5	MF	(Russia) RUS	Soslan Dzhioyev	1	0	0	0	1	0
7	MF	(Russia) RUS	Georgi Gabulov	3	0	3	0	0	0
8	MF	(Russia) RUS	Mikhail Bakayev	22	0	8+13	0	1	0
9	MF	(Russia) RUS	Arsen Khubulov	15	1	10+5	1	0	0
10	FW	(Hungary) HUN	Tamás Priskin	23	5	19+4	5	0	0
11	FW	(Brazil) BRA	Danilo Neco	23	9	22+1	9	0	0
13	DF	(Brazil) BRA	Welinton	10	1	9+1	1	0	0
14	DF	(Russia) RUS	Zaurbek Kambolov	4	0	0+4	0	0	0
15	DF	(Bosnia and Herzegovina) BIH	Ognjen Vranješ	7	2	5+2	2	0	0
17	MF	(Russia) RUS	Taras Tsarikayev	17	0	16+1	0	0	0
18	MF	(Lithuania) LTU	Deividas Šemberas	27	0	26+1	0	0	0
19	FW	(Russia) RUS	Aleksandr Prudnikov	3	0	2+1	0	0	0
20	DF	(Ivory Coast) CIV	Dacosta Goore	11	0	9+2	0	0	0
22	MF	(El Salvador) ESA	Rodolfo Zelaya	1	0	1	0	0	0
23	DF	(Russia) RUS	Anton Grigoryev	22	1	19+3	1	0	0
24	MF	(Russia) RUS	Roland Gigolayev	7	0	1+6	0	0	0
25	DF	(Romania) ROU	Ioan Mera	4	1	2+1	0	1	1
27	FW	(Russia) RUS	Dzambolat Khastsayev	1	0	0+1	0	00	0
31	MF	(Belarus) BLR	Renan Bressan	10	0	9+1	0	0	0
33	GK	(Russia) RUS	Vitali Gudiyev	4	0	3	0	1	0
35	GK	(Russia) RUS	Soslan Dzhanayev	10	0	10	0	0	0
37	MF	(Russia) RUS	Batraz Khadartsev	1	0	0	0	1	0
39	MF	(Georgia (country)) GEO	Giorgi Chanturia	6	0	4+2	0	0	0
44	DF	(Russia) RUS	Marat Butuyev	1	0	0	0	0+1	0
48	DF	(Russia) RUS	Azat Bairyyev	19	0	17+2	0	0	0
49	FW	(Brazil) BRA	Diego Maurício	13	0	3+9	0	1	0
51	DF	(Russia) RUS	Aleksandr Kleshchenko	1	0	0	0	1	0
55	DF	(Russia) RUS	Georgiy Buraev	1	0	0	0	1	0
84	MF	(Brazil) BRA	Rudnei	19	0	18+1	0	0	0
87	MF	(Netherlands) NED	Royston Drenthe	6	3	6	3	0	0
94	FW	(Russia) RUS	Zaurbek Olisayev	1	0	0	0	0+1	0
98	DF	(Russia) RUS	Igor Khaymanov	1	0	0+1	0	0	0
Players who left Alania Vladikavkaz during the season:
6	DF	(Moldova) MDA	Simeon Bulgaru	13	0	10+2	0	1	0
7	MF	(Uzbekistan) UZB	Sanzhar Tursunov	10	0	5+5	0	0	0
13	MF	(Kazakhstan) KAZ	Kazbek Geteriev	3	0	2	0	1	0
19	FW	(Russia) RUS	Dmitri Golubov	3	0	1+2	0	0	0
21	DF	(Brazil) BRA	Carlos Cardoso	8	0	7+1	0	0	0
30	MF	(Georgia (country)) GEO	Shota Grigalashvili	9	0	8+1	0	0	0
36	DF	(Russia) RUS	Dmitri Grachyov	7	0	5+1	0	1	0

=== Goal scorers ===
Place	Position	Nation	Number	Name	Premier League	Russian Cup	Total
1	FW	(Brazil)	11	Danilo Neco	9	0	9
2	FW	(Hungary)	10	Tamás Priskin	5	0	5
3	DF	(Russia)	2	Vladimir Khozin	3	0	3
3	MF	(Netherlands)	87	Royston Drenthe	3	0	3
5	FW	(Russia)	9	Arsen Khubulov	2	0	2
5	DF	(Bosnia and Herzegovina)	15	Ognjen Vranješ	2	0	2
7	DF	(Russia)	23	Anton Grigoryev	1	0	1
7	DF	(Brazil)	13	Welinton	1	0	1
7	DF	(Romania)	25	Ioan Mera	0	1	1
				TOTALS	26	1	27

=== Clean sheets ===
Place	Position	Nation	Number	Name	Premier League	Russian Cup	Total
1	GK	(Russia)	35	Soslan Dzhanayev	3	0	3
2	GK	(Russia)	1	Dmitri Khomich	1	0	1
2	GK	(Russia)	33	Vitali Gudiyev	1	0	1
TOTALS					5	0	5

=== Disciplinary record ===
Number	Nation	Position	Name	Russian Premier League		Russian Cup		Total	
Number	Nation	Position	Name	Yellow card	Red card	Yellow card	Red card	Yellow card	Red card
1	(Russia)	GK	Dmitri Khomich	1	0	0	0	1	0
2	(Russia)	DF	Vladimir Khozin	7	0	0	0	7	0
3	(Russia)	DF	Zaurbek Pliyev	4	0	0	0	4	0
4	(Russia)	DF	Aslan Dudiyev	2	2	0	0	2	2
7	(Russia)	MF	Georgi Gabulov	0	1	0	0	0	1
8	(Russia)	MF	Mikhail Bakayev	3	0	1	0	4	0
9	(Russia)	MF	Arsen Khubulov	4	0	0	0	4	0
10	(Hungary)	FW	Tamás Priskin	5	0	0	0	5	0
11	(Brazil)	FW	Danilo Neco	5	1	0	0	5	1
13	(Brazil)	DF	Welinton	0	1	0	0	0	1
14	(Russia)	DF	Zaurbek Kambolov	2	0	0	0	1	0
15	(Bosnia and Herzegovina)	DF	Ognjen Vranješ	2	1	0	0	2	1
17	(Russia)	MF	Taras Tsarikayev	3	0	0	0	3	0
18	(Lithuania)	MF	Deividas Šemberas	8	1	0	0	8	1
19	(Russia)	FW	Aleksandr Prudnikov	1	0	0	0	1	0
20	(Ivory Coast)	DF	Dacosta Goore	6	1	0	0	6	1
23	(Russia)	DF	Anton Grigoryev	7	1	0	0	7	1
24	(Russia)	DF	Roland Gigolayev	1	0	0	0	1	0
25	(Romania)	DF	Ioan Mera	2	0	0	0	2	0
35	(Russia)	GK	Vitali Gudiyev	3	0	0	0	3	0
39	(Georgia (country))	MF	Giorgi Chanturia	1	1	0	0	1	1
44	(Russia)	DF	Marat Butuyev	0	0	1	0	1	0
48	(Russia)	DF	Azat Bairyyev	4	0	0	0	4	0
49	(Brazil)	FW	Diego Maurício	1	0	0	0	1	0
51	(Russia)	DF	Aleksandr Kleshchenko	0	0	2	1	2	1
84	(Brazil)	MF	Rudnei	4	0	0	0	4	0
87	(Netherlands)	MF	Royston Drenthe	2	0	0	0	2	0
Players who left Alania Vladikavkaz during the season:
6	(Moldova)	DF	Simeon Bulgaru	2	0	0	0	2	0
13	(Kazakhstan)	MF	Kazbek Geteriev	1	0	1	0	2	0
21	(Brazil)	DF	Carlos Cardoso	1	0	0	0	1	0
30	(Georgia (country))	MF	Shota Grigalashvili	2	0	0	0	2	0
36	(Russia)	DF	Dmitri Grachyov	1	0	0	0	1	0
			TOTALS	83	10	5	1	88	11
