= Digoria =

Mountain region in North Ossetia, Russia

Digoria (Ossetic: Дигорæ (Digoræ); Russian: Дигория (Digoria)) is a mostly mountainous region of the North Caucasus in the western part of the Republic of North Ossetia–Alania, Russia. The inhabitants speak the archaic Digor dialect of Ossetian. Today the name most often refers to Irafsky and Digorsky districts of the republic. Its most populous towns are Digora and Chikola which are situated in the agricultural region of the northern plains. The mountain areas to the south include Alania National Park and a number of historical villages where one can see the remains of many stone towers. The settlement of Galiat in particular has preserved a number of old stone towers and houses.

== See also ==
- History of North Ossetia–Alania
- Alania

== Bibliography ==
- Moshinsky A.P. Antiquities of Mountain Digoria of the 7th–4th centuries. BC _ - M . : "State Historical Museum", 2006. - ISBN 5-89076-124-2.
