= Zaurbek =

Zaurbek is a Central Ausian masculine given name. It may refer to the following notable people:

- Zaurbek Baysangurov (born 1985), Russian boxer and IBO and WBO light middleweight champion
- Zaurbek Kambolov (born 1992), Russian footballer
- Zaurbek Konov (born 1985), Russian footballer
- Zaurbek Olisayev (born 1994), Russian footballer
- Zaurbek Pliyev (born 1991), Russian footballer
- Zaurbek Sidakov (born 1996), Russian freestyle wrestler
- Zaurbek Sokhiev (born 1986), Uzbekistani freestyle wrestler
