= Burchula =

Mountain on the border of Georgia and Russia

- Location within Caucasus Mountains Location within Georgia Location within Racha-Lechkhumi and Kvemo Svaneti Location within North Ossetia–Alania

Highest point
- Elevation: 4,364 m (14,318 ft)
- Prominence: 2,353 m (7,720 ft)
- Listing: Ultra
- Coordinates: 42°46′58.9″N 43°41′49.1″E

Naming
- Native name: ბურჭულა (Karaugom), Къæрæугомы хох (Qæræwgomy xox)

Geography
- Countries: Georgia and North Ossetia–Alania
- Parent range: Caucasus

Geology
- Mountain type: Stratovolcano (dormant)

Burchula (Georgian: ბურჭულა) or Karaugom (Iron Ossetic: Къæрæугомы хох Qæræwgomy xox) is a peak in the Greater Caucasus Mountain Range, located inside in the Alaniya National Park of North Ossetia–Alania on the border with Oni Municipality of Georgia.

== Geography ==
The elevation of the mountain is 4,364.5 metres (14,319 ft) above sea level. The peak is mainly made up of pre-Cambrian granites. Burchula is covered by ice and glaciers at higher elevations while the lower part of the mountain consists of steep and jagged cliffs. The glacier Southern Notsarula descends from the mountain's western flank and is the source of the Notsarula River (tributary of Kotsaniara river, left tributary of the Rioni). The Bokho Glacier descends from Burchula's southeastern flank.
