= Alaniya National Park =

National park in Russia

- IUCN category II (national park)
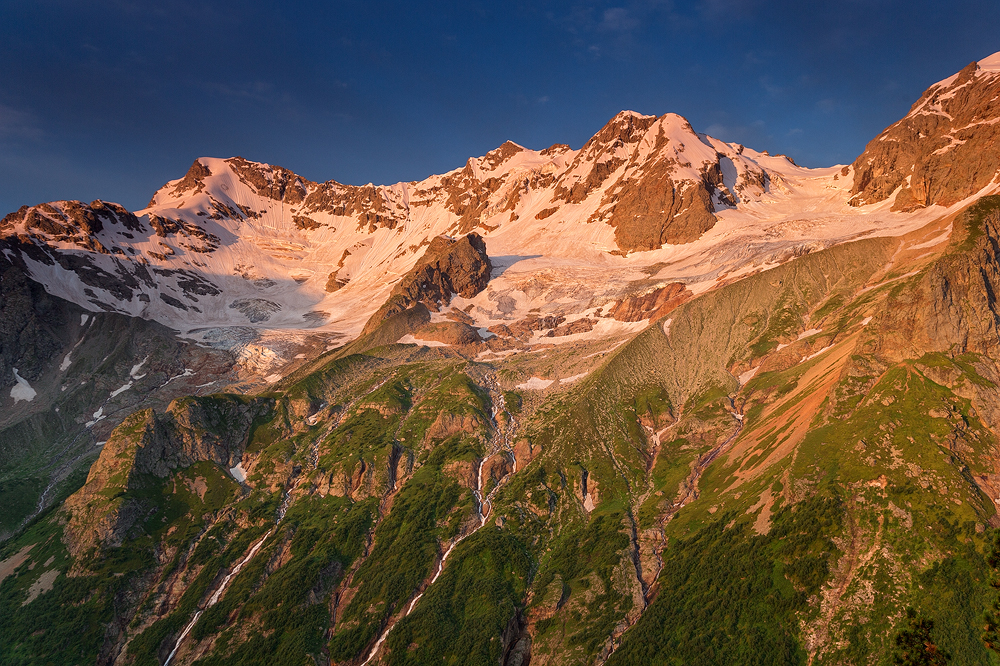
- Alaniya National Park
- Location of Alania NP, on the north slope of the Central Caucasus
- Location: North Ossetia-Alania
- Nearest city: Vladikavkaz
- Coordinates: 42°54′N 43°44′E
- Area: 54,926 hectares (135,725 acres; 549 km^{2}; 212 sq mi)
- Established: 1998
- Governing body: FGBU "Alania"
- Website: http://npalania.ru/

Alaniya National Park (Russian: Национальный парк «Ала́ния»), is a heavily glaciated, mountainous section of the northern slope of the Central Caucasus Mountains. It covers the southern third of the Irafsky District of the Republic of North Ossetia-Alania. The park was created to have a dual purpose of serving as an ecological refuge - it has very high levels of biodiversity and vulnerable species, such as the near-endangered west Caucasian tur – and also an area of high cultural heritage and potential for recreational tourism. The park contains widespread archaeological ruins from several notable past civilizations, including the Bronze Age Koban people (1200–300 BCE), and the Alan people (100 BCE – 1234 AD). It is from the Alans that the name "Alaniya", and indirectly the term "Aryan", is ultimately derived. Because altitudes in the park can span almost 4,000 meters vertical in very short distances, the slopes and valleys display strong "altitude zoning". These climatic zones range from alpine glaciers and peaks in the high, southern sections, to steppe grasslands in the northern reaches.

== Topography ==
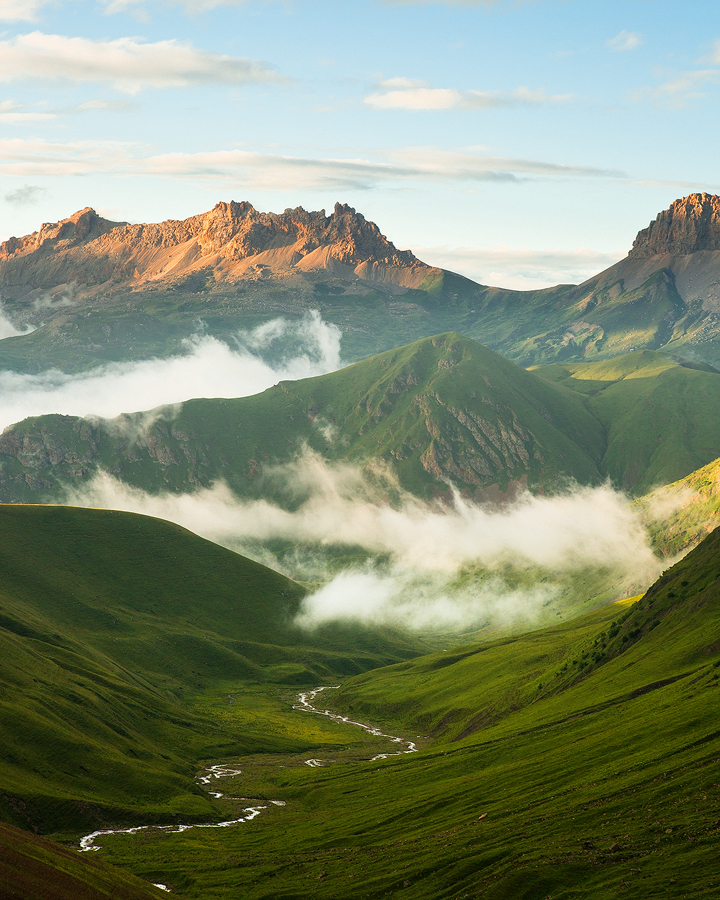
Altitude zones (bare rock and scree on peaks, forest on middle slopes, and grassland in valleys. Alania NP, Irafsky District

The park sits at a central point of the Caucusus, which are themselves the continental divide between Asia and Europe. Alaniya NP is approximately two-thirds of the distance between the Black Sea to the west and the Caspian Sea to the east. The southern border of the park, at the top of the mountain ridge, runs along the border with the Republic of Georgia. To the west is the Kabardino-Balkaria Reserve (another mountain-peak protected area), and to the east is the North Ossetian Reserve.

Altitudes range from a high at Mount Uilpata of 4,646 metres (15,243 ft), to 800 meters in the Urukh River valley below. Most of the ground cover is glacier, rock and scree at the higher altitudes. Modern glaciation is approximately 80 square kilometres (8,000 ha; 19,768 acres; 31 sq mi). At mid-level altitudes, approximately 20% of the park is forested. At the lowest levels, and in the valleys to the north, are grasslands and scattered forest.

The park has more than 70 rivers and streams, mostly fed by glaciers. The few lakes are small in size and also fed by glaciers and snow runoff. The 45 lakes cover an area of only 11 hectares in total, while the 5 alpine marshes cover a total area of 103 hectares. The main ridge and side ridge are composed of granites, gneisses and schists, with the younger sedimentary rocks gathered in large fan-shaped folds. There are mineral springs in the upper valleys, waterfalls, and forest glades on terraces. Named glaciers include the Masota, Tana, Karuaugom, Songuti, Bart, Fastagstete, and Tasmazov.

The primary river valley through the park is the Urukh River, fed by the Karaugom Glacier and numerous glacial tributaries. The Karaugom Glacier is 1.3 km long, and 26.6 km in area. In elevation, the glacier reaches from 3,440 meters at the top to 1,830 meters at the bottom of the tongue – a height of 1,610 metres (1 mile). A recent study associated the glacier's with a rise in temperatures in the Central Caucusus of 0.05 degrees C per year, and an average glacial retreat of 8 meters per year. Moreover, the Karaugom descends to a lower altitude than any other glacier in the Caucusus, well into the forested zone.

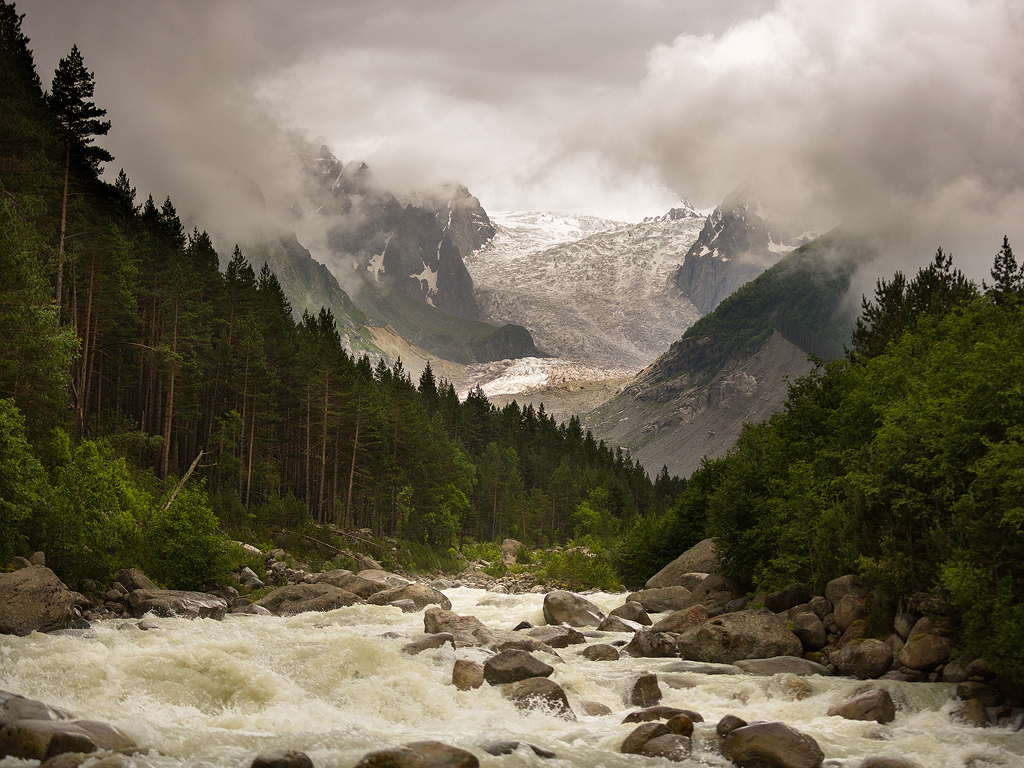
Karaugom Glacier, distant view from north up the Urukh River. A mile-high wall of ice.

== Climate and ecoregion ==
The climate of the general region is humid continental, (Dfa on the Koppen climate scale). The region is characterized by long, snowy winters and short, cool summers.

- Average January temperature: −5 °C (23 °F)
- Average July temperature: +24 °C (75 °F)
- Average annual precipitation: 400–700 millimeters (16–28 in) in the plains; over 1,000 millimeters (39 in) in the mountains.

Alaniya is in the Caucasus mixed forests ecoregion, described by the World Wildlife Federation as "one of the most biologically rich and culturally diverse regions on Earth". The area is at a biological cross-roads. Species from Europe, Asia, the Middle East, and North Africa meet in the Caucasus.

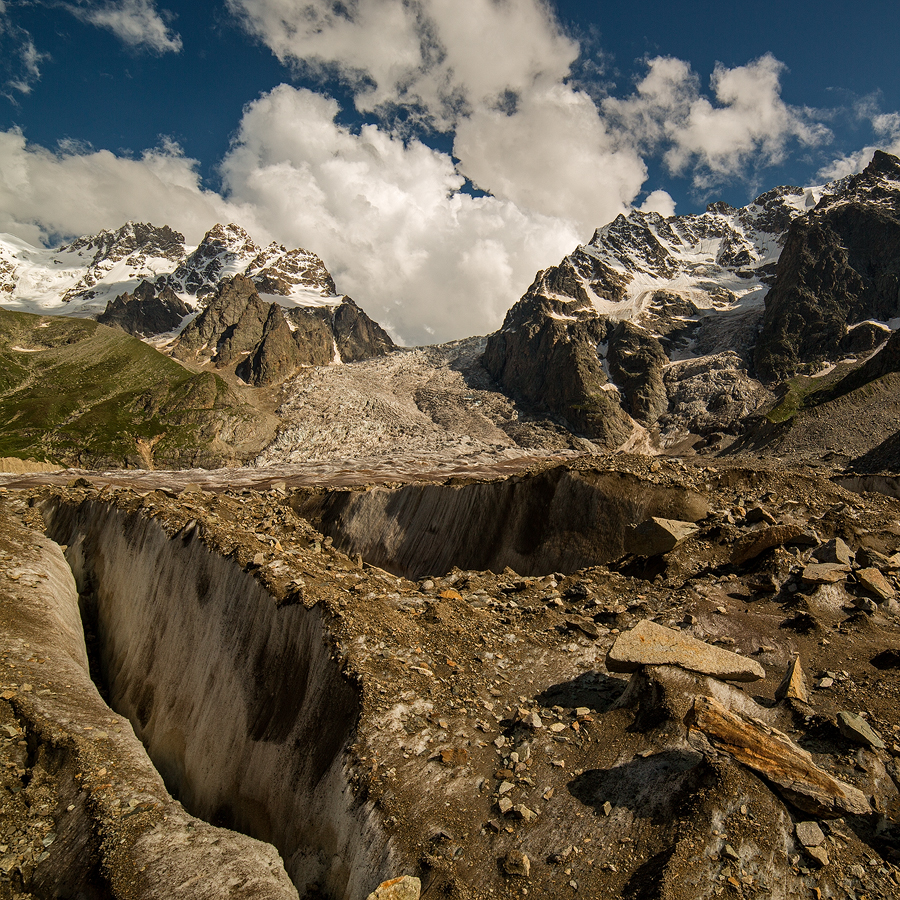
Karaugom Glacier, at the base of the icefield

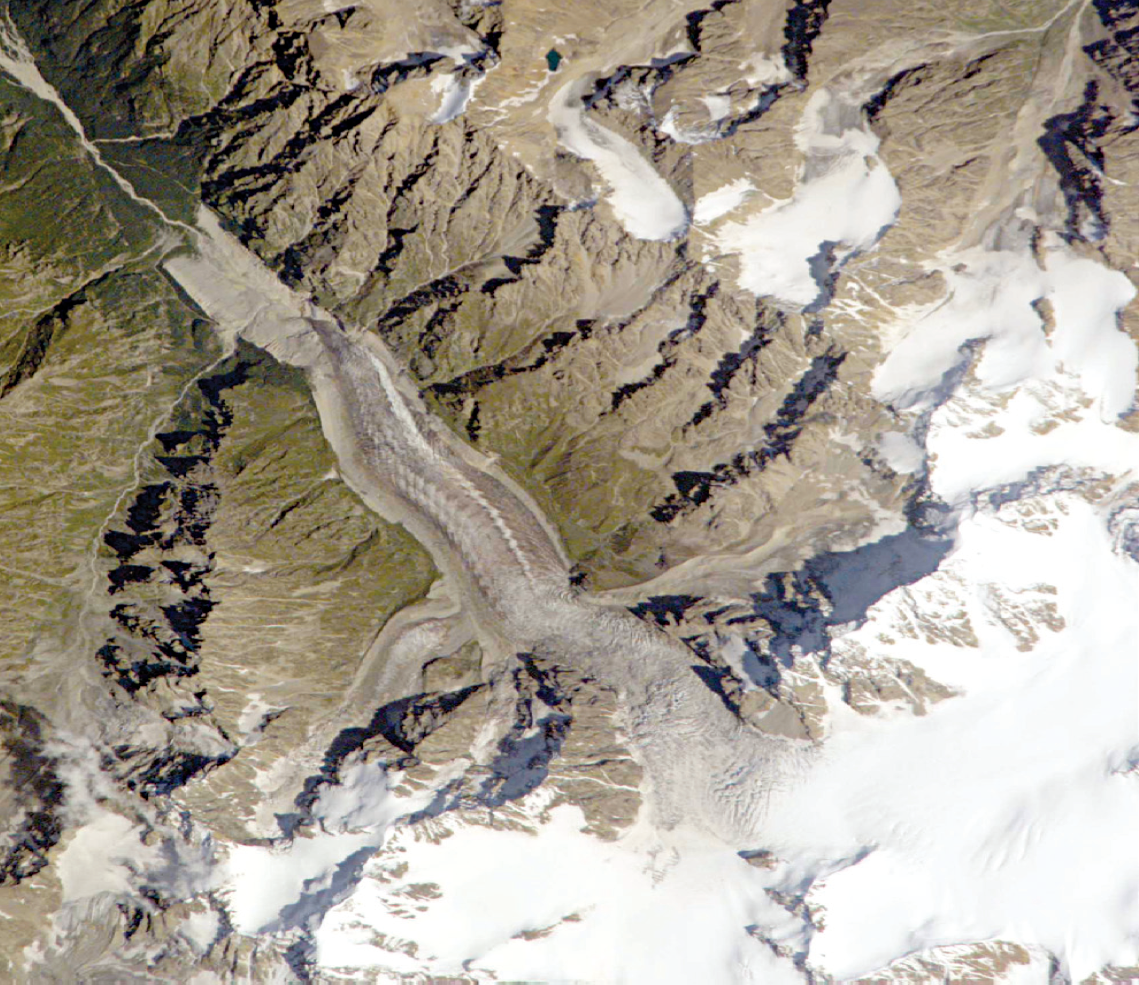
Karaugom Glacier from the ISS, 2002

== Plants ==
The highest altitudes, above 1,800 meters are alpine and sub-alpine in character. At mid-level altitudes, approximately 20% of the park is forested, with pine, rhododendron, yellow birch, juniper and wild rose being common. At the lowest levels, and in the valleys to the north, are grasslands and river plain plant communities. Over 1,000 species of plants have been identified in the park, 200 of which are endemic to the Caucasus.

At the upper level of the Haresskogouschelya river valley, at the 2,400-meter level, is the "Chifandzar Swamp". This peatland is approximately 3 hectares in size, dominated by sphagnum, sedge and northern flowers such as the golden buttercup. With a depth of 3 meters, it is believed that the Chifandzar is 5,000 years old.

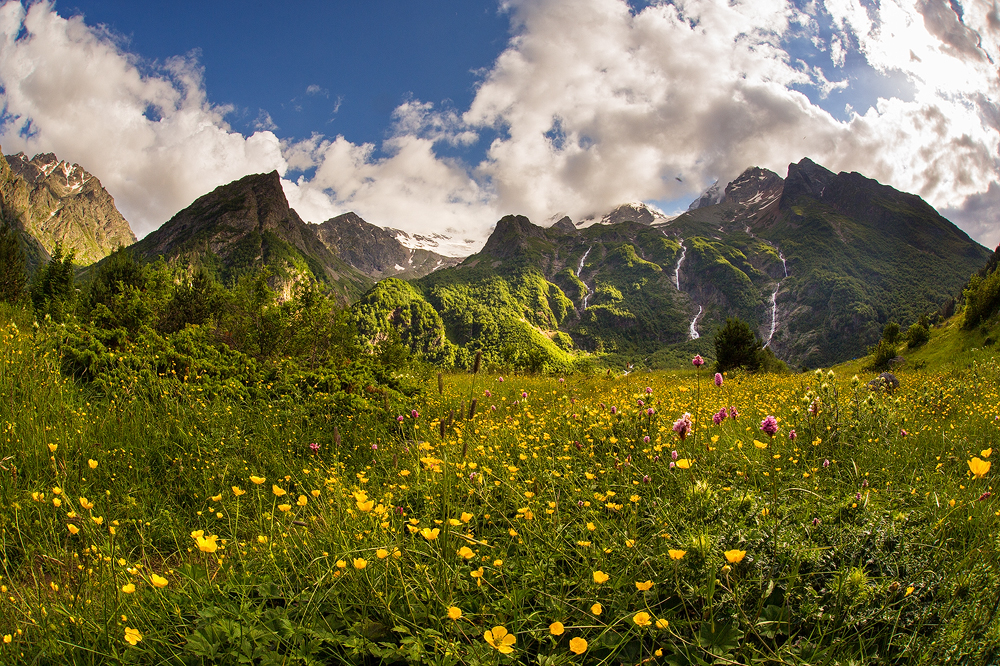
Alpine meadows, Alaniya highlands

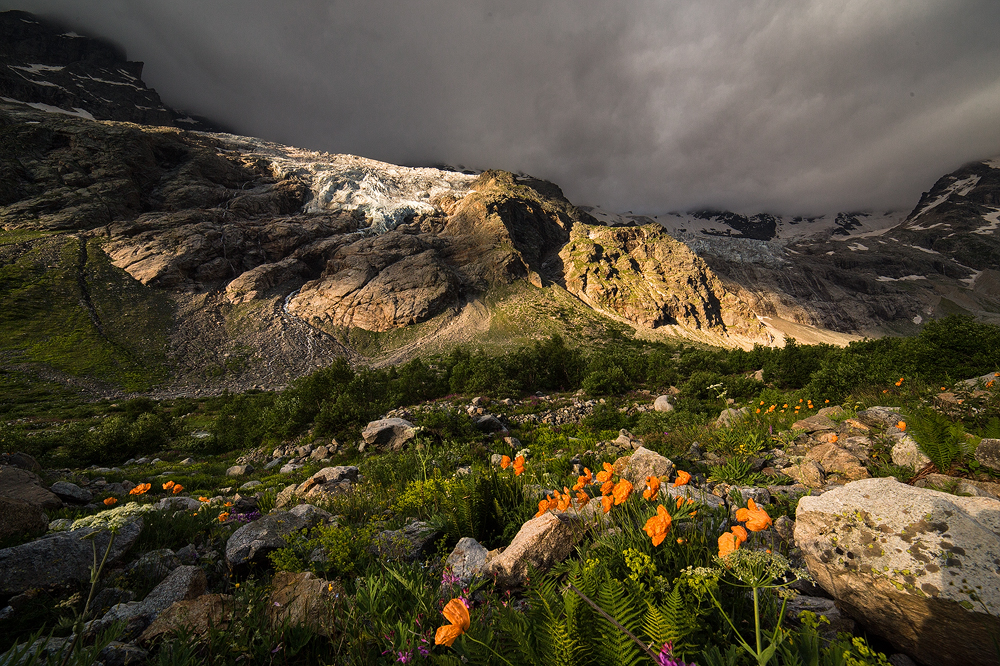
Morning in the Tanadon Gorge

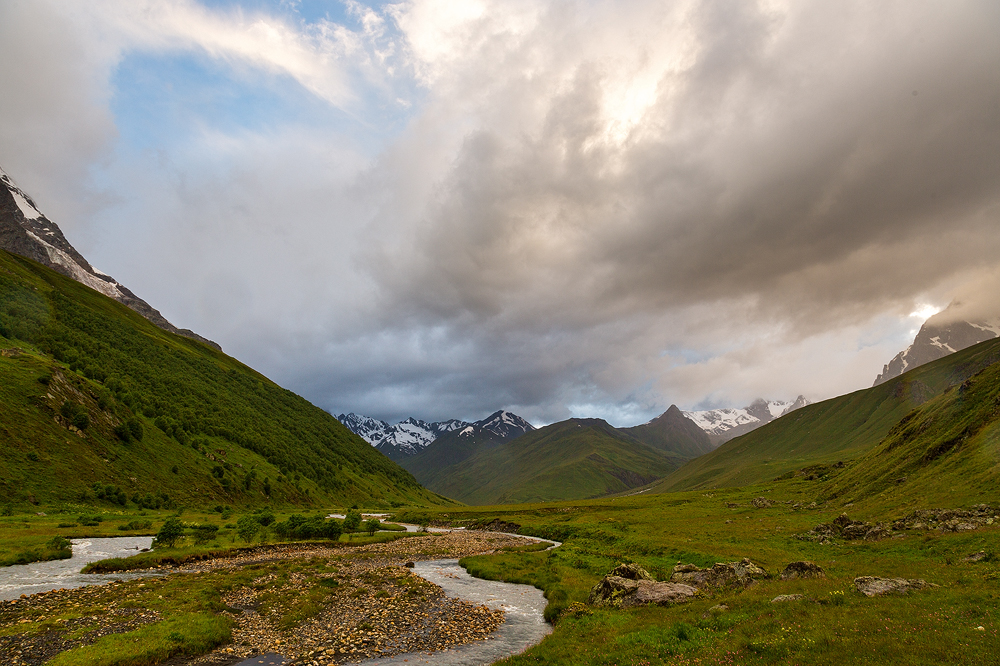
Chifandzar swamp (peatland)

== Animals ==
The mammals in the park are those typical of the forested areas of the north slope of the Caucasus, with 34 species that include wolves, jackals, and chamois, lynx, and fox, as well as the near-threatened west Caucasian tur.

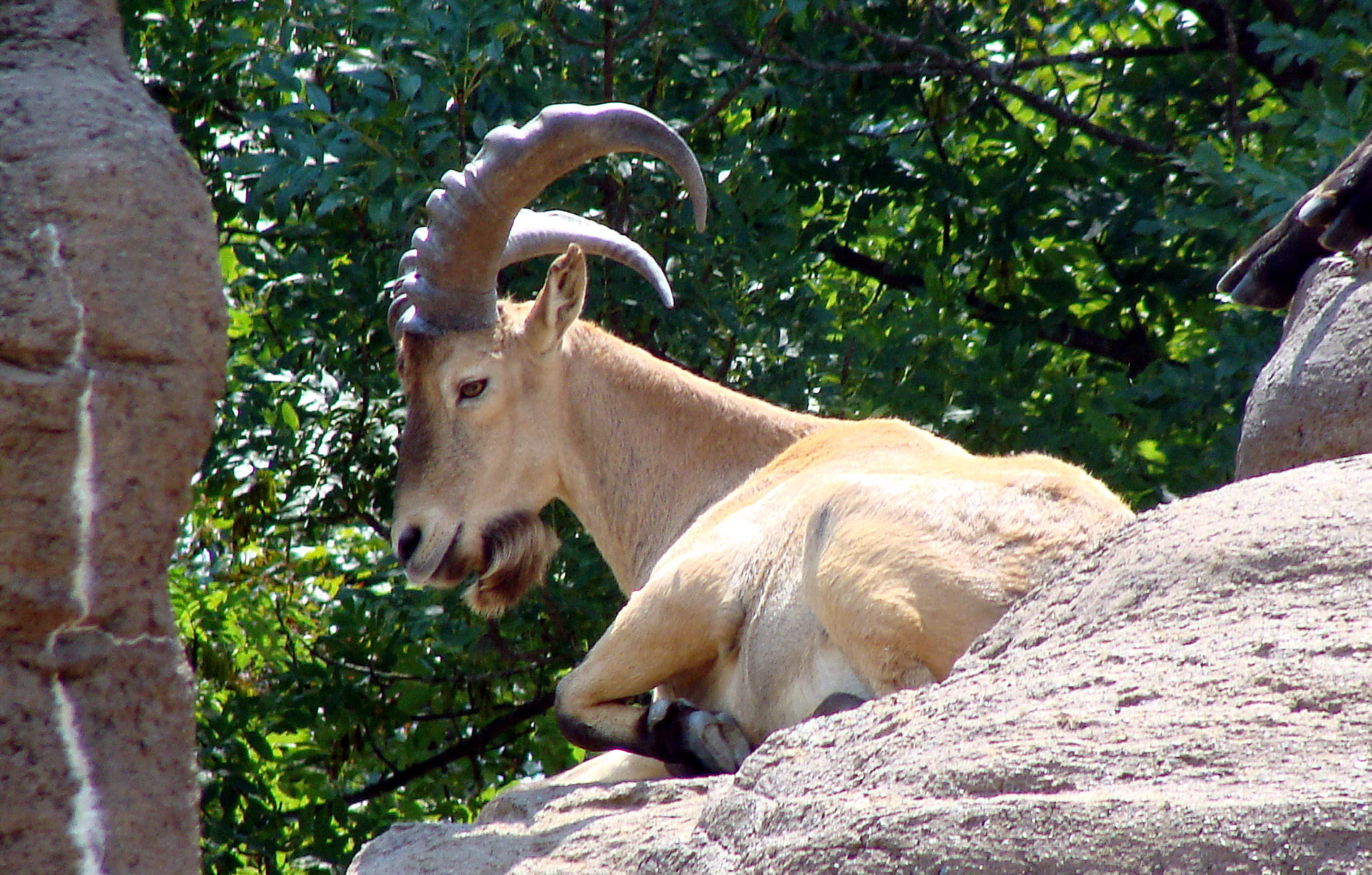
West Caucasian tur (status: near threatened)

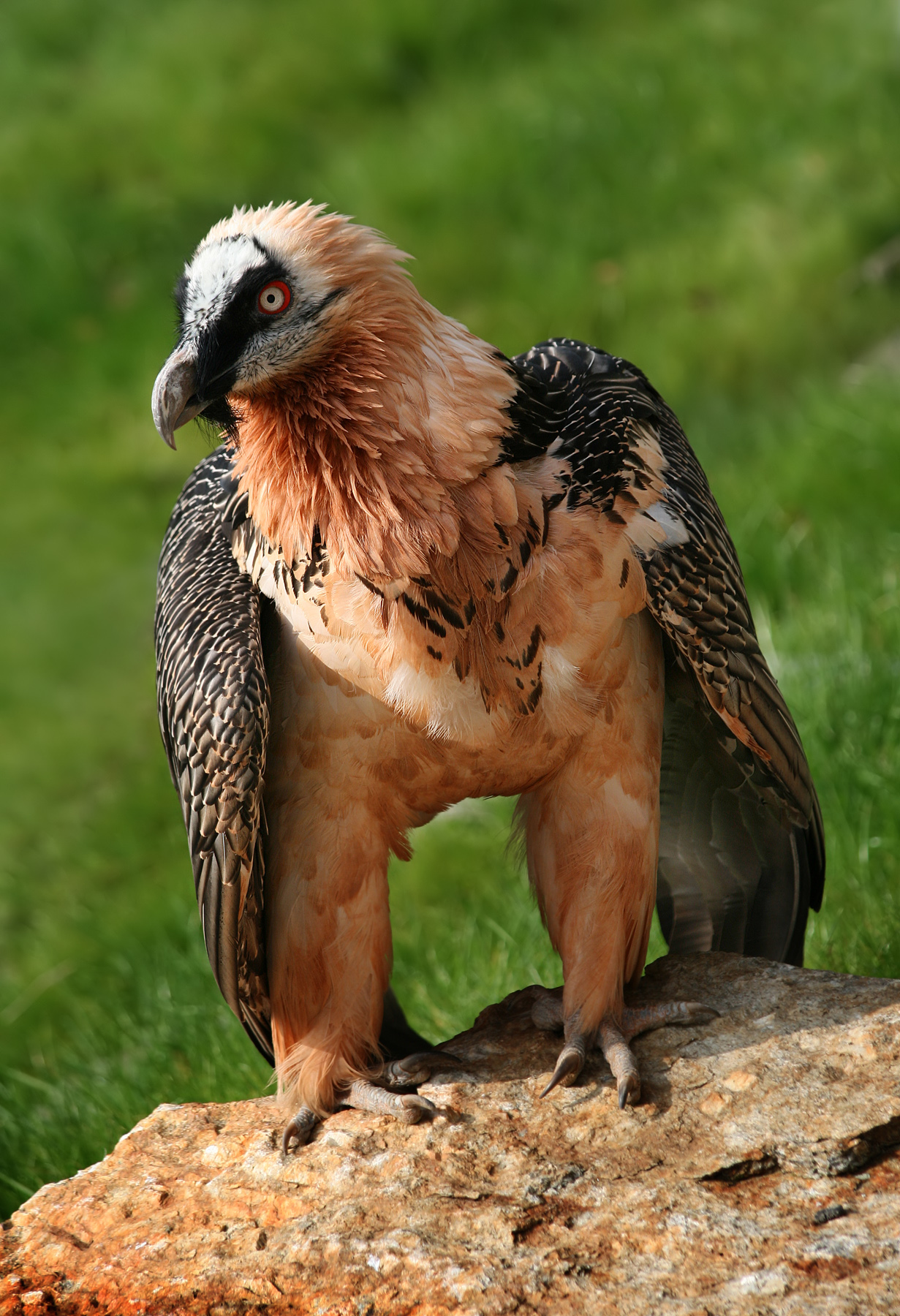
Bearded vulture (status: near threatened)

The entirety of Alaniya NP has been a designated an "Important Bird and Biodiversity Area" (IBA) by BirdLife International, citing the presence of vulnerable trigger species such as the near-threatened bearded vulture and Caucasian grouse. 116 species of bird are found in the park, with 42 species known to be breeding.

The only fish found in the streams of Alaniya is the brook trout. Of the five known reptiles in the park, a notable resident is the vulnerable steppe viper. Mushrooms include Rubroboletus satanas (Satan's mushroom) with a compact cap that can reach 12 inches.

== History ==
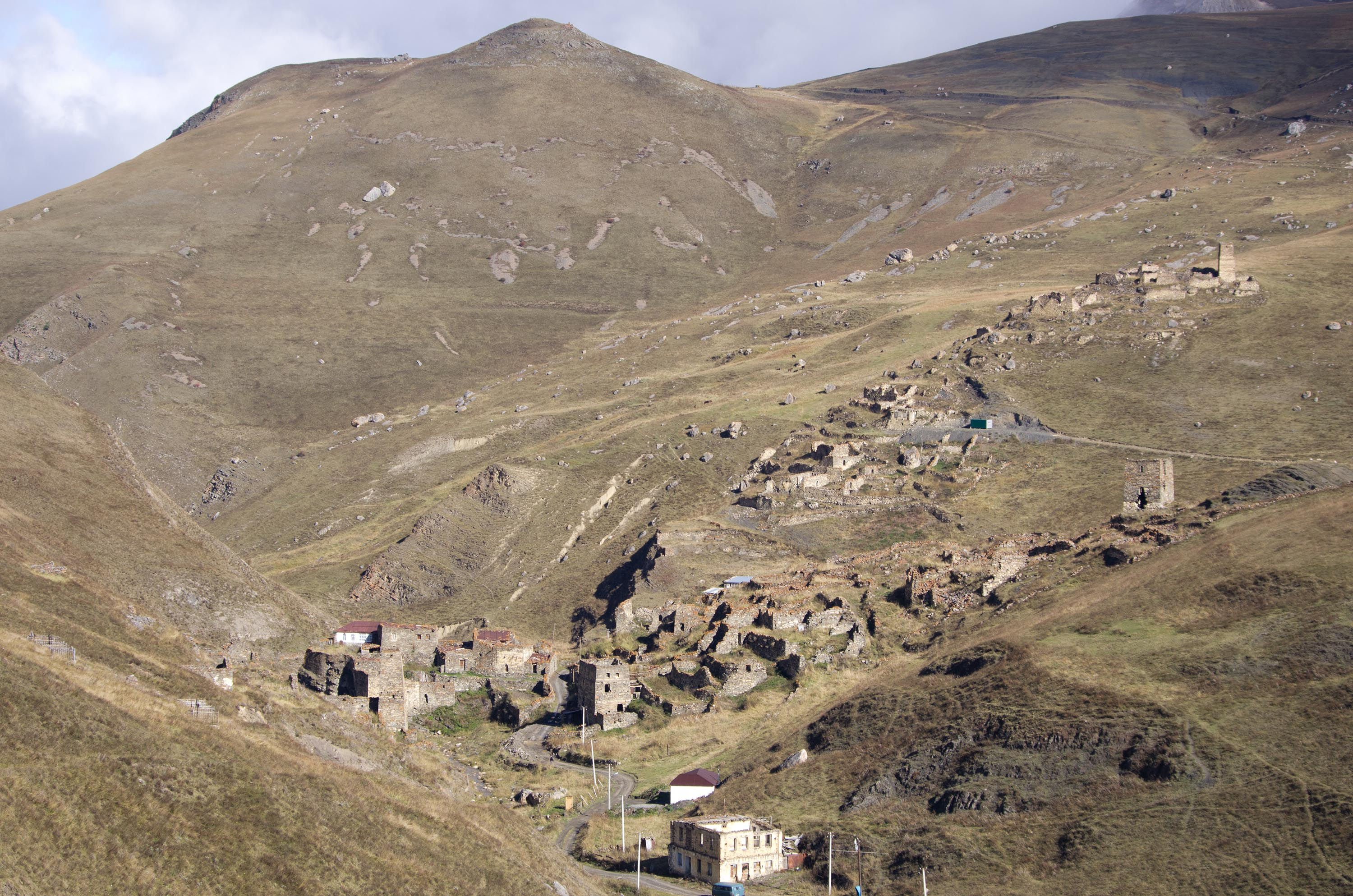
Archaeological ruins, Village of Galiat in the protected cultural zone on the northeast border of NP Alaniya

The area of Alaniya NP has been inhabited for thousands of years. Because it features fertile territory on an important trade route through the Caucasus, it has been a home for many succeeding groups who have left archaeological remains of their presence. The Bronze Age Koban culture inhabited the area from about 1100 BC through 400 BC, when they are believed to have been destroyed by the Scythians. The Koban people established workshops of skilled metal-workers, taking advantage of the mineral resources of the mountainous area. The Koban also developed terrace agriculture, beginning a tradition of soil erosion in the area that eventually left large patches of the terraced land infertile.

In the early years of the first millennium, the area was settled by the Alans people. The Alans, a warlike, nomadic tribe who spoke an Iranian language, had been nomadic throughout Europe before eventually settling in the Northern Caucasus around 700 CE. They built a powerful kingdom in the Alaniya area. When they were militarily overcome by the Mongols in about 1300 CE, they retreated into the hills, remaining relatively isolated until 500 years later. These Alans were the medieval ancestors of the current Ossetian people. The present-day people in the western areas of North Ossetia (known historically as Digoria) sometimes speak the Digor dialect; they were one of the last groups brought officially into Ossetia.

The mountainous area of Irafsky District has experienced a long-term population decline and out-migration for the past 200 years. As to the park itself, the present administrative unit was preceded by a protected forestry reserve established in 1958. In the years following and through the creation of full national park status in 1998, the assembly of linked protection zones was created. Today, the park is protected by the Department of Forestry and Protection, with full-time patrols by car, horse and foot to enforce environmental laws.

== Tourism ==
For all types of visitors to the recreational zones, permits are issued in the city of Chikola, with allowances for cars and pets. To venture into the security zone on the border, permits must be obtained from one the frontier offices (see the park's website for details); a 1- to 30-day turnaround time may be necessary.

Transportation to the park is typically by train or plane to Vladikavkaz, then by bus or taxi to Chikola. There are hostels in Dzinaga and Rostelmash, and a hotel at the "gates of heaven" location in the park. There are also accommodations at the climbing camp "Coma-Art"; contact directly for information.

The park is well known for mountain climbing. Climbs from the simple to 6B in the Russian classification; the two highest peaks are Uilpata (4649 m) and Laboda (4313.7 m).

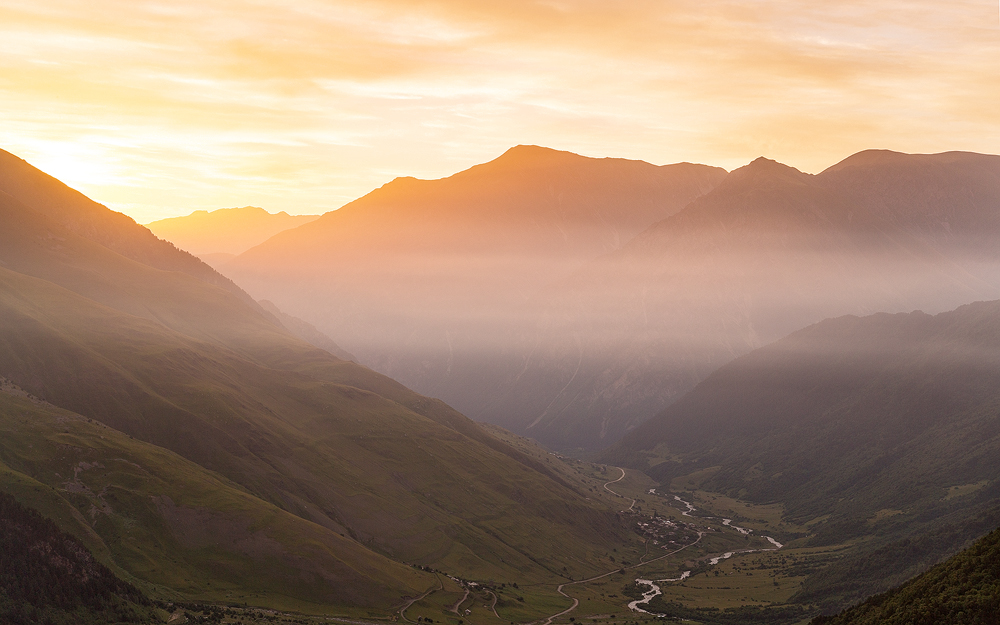
Village of Stur-Digora, valley of the Upper Urukh River

== See also ==
- Protected areas of Russia
- History of North Ossetia-Alania
