= Kambolov =

Kambolov (Russian: Камболов) is an Ossetian masculine surname, its feminine counterpart is Kambolova. The surname may refer to the following notable people:

- Marat Kambolov, Ossetian civil servant and politician
- Ruslan Kambolov (born 1990), Russian football player
- Zaurbek Kambolov (born 1992), Russian-Ossetian football player
