= Azamat Tomayev =

Russian footballer

Personal information
- Full name: Azamat Aleksandrovich Tomayev
- Date of birth: 21 March 1991 (age 35)
- Place of birth: Vladikavkaz, Russian SFSR
- Height: 1.80 m (5 ft 11 in)
- Position: Goalkeeper

Team information
- Current team: FC Alania Vladikavkaz (GK coach)

Senior career*
| Years | Team | Apps | (Gls) |
| 2010–2021 | FC FAYUR Beslan | 21 | (0) |
| 2012–2014 | FC Alania-d Vladikavkaz | 44 | (0) |
| 2014–2017 | FC Alania Vladikavkaz | 55 | (0) |
| 2017–2019 | FC Khimik-Arsenal | 26 | (0) |
| 2019–2020 | FC Inkomsport Yalta | 14 | (0) |
| 2020 | FC TSK Simferopol | 13 | (0) |
| 2020–2021 | FC Gvardeyets Skvortsovo | | |
| 2021–2023 | FC Alania Vladikavkaz | 9 | (0) |
| 2023–2024 | FC Alania-2 Vladikavkaz | 1 | (0) |

Managerial career
- 2024–2025: FC Alania-2 Vladikavkaz (assistant)
- 2025–: FC Alania Vladikavkaz (GK coach)
- * Club domestic league appearances and goals

Azamat Aleksandrovich Tomayev (Russian: Азамат Александрович Томаев; born 21 March 1991) is a Russian football coach and a former player who is the goalkeepers' coach with FC Alania Vladikavkaz.

== Club career ==
He made his debut in the Russian Football National League for FC Alania Vladikavkaz on 15 August 2021 in a game against FC Spartak-2 Moscow.
