= Ognjen Vranješ =

Bosnian footballer (born 1989)

Personal information
- Date of birth: 24 October 1989 (age 37)
- Place of birth: Banja Luka, SR Bosnia and Herzegovina, SFR Yugoslavia
- Height: 1.83 m (6 ft 0 in)
- Position: Centre-back

Youth career
- 2000–2007: Borac Banja Luka

Senior career*
Years	Team	Apps	(Gls)
2007–2009	Borac Banja Luka	41	(1)
2009–2011	Red Star Belgrade	4	(0)
2010	→ Napredak Kruševac (loan)	12	(1)
2010	→ Sheriff Tiraspol (loan)	9	(0)
2011–2013	Krasnodar	37	(1)
2013–2014	Spartak Vladikavkaz	7	(2)
2014	Elazığspor	13	(0)
2015–2016	Gaziantepspor	23	(0)
2016	Sporting Gijón	11	(0)
2016–2017	Tom Tomsk	7	(1)
2017–2018	AEK Athens	36	(5)
2018–2021	Anderlecht	14	(0)
2019–2020	→ AEK Athens (loan)	18	(1)
2021	→ Charleroi (loan)	9	(0)
2021–2022	AEK Athens	22	(3)
2022–2023	Hatayspor	15	(0)
2023–2024	Čukarički	13	(0)
Total		291	(15)

International career
2008–2010	Bosnia and Herzegovina U21	10	(2)
2010–2018	Bosnia and Herzegovina	38	(0)
- * Club domestic league appearances and goals

Ognjen Vranješ (pronounced [ǒɡɲen ʋrǎɲeʃ]; born 24 October 1989) is a Bosnian former professional footballer who played as a centre-back.

Vranješ started his professional career at Borac Banja Luka, before joining Red Star Belgrade in 2009. He was sent on loan to Napredak Kruševac in 2010 and to Sheriff Tiraspol later that year. Vranješ then played in Russia for Krasnodar and Spartak Vladikavkaz and in Turkey for Elazığspor and Gaziantepspor. He signed with Sporting Gijón in 2016. Later that year, he switched to Tom Tomsk. A year later, he moved to AEK Athens. The following year, Vranješ was transferred to Anderlecht, who loaned him back to AEK Athens in 2019 and to Charleroi in 2021. Later that year, he came back to AEK Athens. In 2022, he joined Hatayspor. A year after, he moved to Čukarički.

A former youth international for Bosnia and Herzegovina, Vranješ made his senior international debut in 2010, earning over 30 caps until 2018. He represented the nation at their first ever major championship, the 2014 FIFA World Cup.

== Club career ==
=== Early career ===
Vranješ came through the youth academy of his hometown club Borac Banja Luka, which he joined in 2000. He made his professional debut in 2007 at the age of 17. On 9 August 2008, he scored his first professional goal against Orašje, which secured the victory for his team.

In December, he signed with Serbian side Red Star Belgrade. In January 2010, he was sent on a six-month loan to Napredak Kruševac. In July, he was loaned to Moldovan outfit Sheriff Tiraspol until the end of the season.

In January 2011, Vranješ moved to Russian team Krasnodar.

In December 2012, he joined Spartak Vladikavkaz. In May 2013, he suffered a severe knee injury, which was diagnosed as an anterior cruciate ligament tear and was ruled out for at least six months.

In January 2014, he went to Turkish club Elazığspor.

In February 2015, he switched to Gaziantepspor.

In January 2016, Vranješ joined Spanish outfit Sporting Gijón.

In August, he signed with Tom Tomsk.

=== AEK Athens ===
In December, Vranješ moved to Greek side AEK Athens on a contract until June 2019. He was sent off on his official debut for the squad on 7 January against Asteras Tripolis. On 5 February, he scored his first goal for AEK Athens in a triumph over Veria.

Vranješ scored his first career hat-trick in a defeat of Xanthi on 18 February 2018.

He won his first trophy with the club on 23 April, when they were crowned league champions.

=== Anderlecht ===
In June, Vranješ was transferred to Belgian outfit Anderlecht for an undisclosed fee. He made his competitive debut for the side on 28 July against Kortrijk and scored an own goal.

In June 2019, he was sent on a season-long loan to his former team AEK Athens.

In January 2021, he was loaned to Charleroi for the remainder of the campaign.

=== Return to AEK Athens ===
In July, Vranješ returned to AEK Athens on a two-year deal. He played his first official game for the club since coming back in a UEFA Conference League qualifier against Velež on 29 July. Six weeks later, he appeared in his first league game after returning against Ionikos. On 3 October, he scored first goal for AEK Athens since his comeback in a victory over Panetolikos.

He played his 100th match for the squad against Panetolikos on 16 January 2022.

=== Later stage of career ===
In July, Vranješ signed with Hatayspor.

In September 2023, he moved to Čukarički.

He announced his retirement from football on 6 November 2025.

== International career ==
Vranješ was a member of the Bosnia and Herzegovina under-21 team for several years.

In August 2010, he received his first senior call-up, for UEFA Euro 2012 qualifiers against Luxembourg and France, but had to wait until 17 November to make his debut in a friendly game against Slovakia.

In June 2014, Vranješ was named in Bosnia and Herzegovina's squad for the 2014 FIFA World Cup, country's first ever major competition. He made his tournament debut in the last group match against Iran on 25 June.

He retired from international football on 13 February 2020.

== Personal life ==
Vranješ's older brother Stojan is also a professional footballer.

He and his ex-wife Danijela, with whom he had been married for six years, have a daughter named Adrijana.

During his career, Vranješ has been the subject of many controversies. In August 2010, he wore Delije shirt to celebrate his then club Sheriff Tiraspol eliminating Dinamo Zagreb in a UEFA Champions League qualifier, which was construed as provocation. In 2015, he made a tattoo depicting borders of Republika Srpska on his left upper arm, which led to public scrutiny. He later apologized and covered the tattoo up. Because of the tattoo, he had many altercations with BHFanaticos, the largest Bosnian support group. In September 2018, he was sentenced to eight months probation for instigating fan violence over his Facebook page during his time with AEK Athens. Later that year, it was spotted that Vranješ had a tattoo of Chetnik duke Momčilo Đujić on his upper right arm, which got him publicly criticized by the Bosnian FA and the fans, with whom he already had bad relations. In January 2019, he was once again in center of a scandal, as media reported that he had an affair with Serbian singer Jelena Karleuša, who was married to footballer Duško Tošić at the time. In January 2023, he, along with his brother, was found guilty of battering a couple and fined 8.000 BAM.

== Career statistics ==
=== Club ===
Appearances and goals by club, season and competition
Club	Season	League			National cup (Note: Includes Bosnian Cup, Serbian Cup, Cupa Moldovei, Russian Cup, Turkish Cup, Greek Cup, Belgian Cup)		Continental		Total	
Club	Season	Division	Apps	Goals	Apps	Goals	Apps	Goals	Apps	Goals
Borac Banja Luka	2007–08	First League of the RS	28	0	1	0	–		29	0
Borac Banja Luka	2008–09	Bosnian Premier League	13	1	1	0	–		14	1
Borac Banja Luka	Total		41	1	2	0	–		43	1
Red Star Belgrade	2008–09	Serbian SuperLiga	4	0	1	0	–		5	0
Napredak Kruševac (loan)	2009–10	Serbian SuperLiga	12	1	–		–		12	1
Sheriff Tiraspol (loan)	2010–11	Moldovan Super Liga	9	0	2	0	10 (Note: Six appearances in UEFA Champions League; four appearances in UEFA Europa League)	0	21	0
Krasnodar	2011–12	Russian Premier League	29	0	2	0	–		31	0
Krasnodar	2012–13	Russian Premier League	8	1	2	0	–		10	1
Krasnodar	Total		37	1	4	0	–		41	1
Spartak Vladikavkaz	2012–13	Russian Premier League	7	2	–		–		7	2
Elazığspor	2013–14	Süper Lig	13	0	1	0	–		14	0
Gaziantepspor	2014–15	Süper Lig	11	0	0	0	–		11	0
Gaziantepspor	2015–16	Süper Lig	12	0	2	0	–		14	0
Gaziantepspor	Total		23	0	2	0	–		25	0
Sporting Gijón	2015–16	La Liga	11	0	–		–		11	0
Tom Tomsk	2016–17	Russian Premier League	7	1	0	0	–		7	1
AEK Athens	2016–17	Super League Greece	17	1	6	0	–		23	1
AEK Athens	2017–18	Super League Greece	19	4	4	0	11 (Note: Two appearances in UEFA Champions League; nine appearances in UEFA Europa League)	0	34	4
AEK Athens	Total		36	5	10	0	11	0	57	5
Anderlecht	2018–19	Belgian Pro League	10	0	1	0	3 (Note: Appearances in UEFA Europa League)	0	14	0
Anderlecht	2020–21	Belgian Pro League	4	0	0	0	–		4	0
Anderlecht	Total		14	0	1	0	3	0	18	0
AEK Athens (loan)	2019–20	Super League Greece	18	1	4	1	4	0	26	2
Charleroi (loan)	2020–21	Belgian Pro League	9	0	2	0	–		11	0
AEK Athens	2021–22	Super League Greece	22	3	0	0	1 (Note: Appearance(s) in UEFA Conference League)	0	23	3
Hatayspor	2022–23	Süper Lig	15	0	0	0	–		15	0
Čukarički	2023–24	Serbian SuperLiga	13	0	0	0	4	0	17	0
Career total			291	15	29	1	33	0	353	16

=== International ===
Appearances and goals by national team and year
National team	Year	Apps	Goals
Bosnia and Herzegovina
Bosnia and Herzegovina	2010	1	0
Bosnia and Herzegovina	2011	1	0
Bosnia and Herzegovina	2012	6	0
Bosnia and Herzegovina	2013	2	0
Bosnia and Herzegovina	2014	5	0
Bosnia and Herzegovina	2015	6	0
Bosnia and Herzegovina	2016	7	0
Bosnia and Herzegovina	2017	5	0
Bosnia and Herzegovina	2018	5	0
Total		38	0

== Honours ==
Borac Banja Luka

- First League of the RS: 2007–08

AEK Athens

- Super League Greece: 2017–18
