= Soslanbek Arshiyev =

Russian professional footballer

Personal information
- Full name: Soslanbek Arsenovich Arshiyev
- Date of birth: 1 January 1989 (age 37)
- Place of birth: Chikola, North Ossetian ASSR, Russian SFSR, Soviet Union
- Height: 1.92 m (6 ft 4 in)
- Position: Goalkeeper

Senior career*
Years	Team	Apps	(Gls)
2005	Mozdok		
2006–2007	Saturn Yegoryevsk	32	(0)
2008–2009	KAMAZ	1	(0)
2010	Gornyak Uchaly	3	(0)
2011	Alania-d Vladikavkaz	9	(0)
2011–2013	Alania Vladikavkaz	0	(0)
2013	GTS Ryzdvyany	13	(0)
2014	Banga Gargždai	10	(0)
2016	Znamya Truda	12	(0)
2017	Mashuk-KMV	11	(0)
2017–2018	Spartak Vladikavkaz	5	(0)
2018	Mashuk-KMV	11	(0)
2019	Spartak Vladikavkaz	11	(0)
2019	Dynamo Stavropol	17	(0)
2020	West Armenia	9	(0)
2020	Digora		
2021	Krasny Smolensk	6	(0)
2021	Alania-2 Vladikavkaz	5	(0)
- * Club domestic league appearances and goals

Soslanbek Arsenovich Arshiyev (Russian: Сосланбек Арсенович Аршиев; born 1 January 1989) is a Russian former professional footballer.

== Club career ==
He made his professional debut in the Russian Second Division in 2006 for FC Saturn Yegoryevsk.

He made his Russian Football National League debut for FC KAMAZ Naberezhnye Chelny on 3 May 2009 in a game against FC Nosta Novotroitsk.
