= Dmitri Grachyov =

Russian footballer

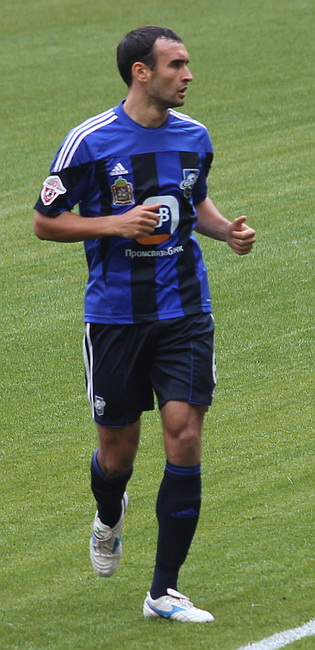

Personal information
- Full name: Dmitri Nikolayevich Grachyov
- Date of birth: 6 October 1983 (age 43)
- Place of birth: Voronezh, Soviet Union
- Height: 1.87 m (6 ft 1 1/2 in)
- Position: Centre back

Youth career
- FC Fakel Voronezh

Senior career*
| Years | Team | Apps | (Gls) |
| 2002–2003 | FC Fakel Voronezh | 5 | (0) |
| 2004 | FC Obninsk | 29 | (0) |
| 2005 | FC Sheksna Cherepovets | 30 | (2) |
| 2006 | FC Fakel Voronezh | 41 | (2) |
| 2007–2008 | FC Zvezda Irkutsk | 66 | (1) |
| 2008–2009 | FC KAMAZ Naberezhnye Chelny | 38 | (2) |
| 2009–2010 | FC Saturn Ramenskoye | 26 | (0) |
| 2011–2012 | FC Alania Vladikavkaz | 50 | (4) |
| 2013–2014 | FC Ufa | 20 | (1) |
| 2014–2015 | FC Luch-Energiya Vladivostok | 16 | (0) |
| 2015–2016 | FC KAMAZ Naberezhnye Chelny | 27 | (0) |
- * Club domestic league appearances and goals

Dmitri Nikolayevich Grachyov (Russian: Дмитрий Николаевич Грачёв, born 6 September 1983) is a former Russian footballer. He played centre back.

After seven years in the Russian First Division, late in August 2009 he proceeded to Saturn Moscow Oblast of the Premier League. He made his professional debut in the Russian First Division in 2002 for FC Fakel Voronezh.
