= Urukh =

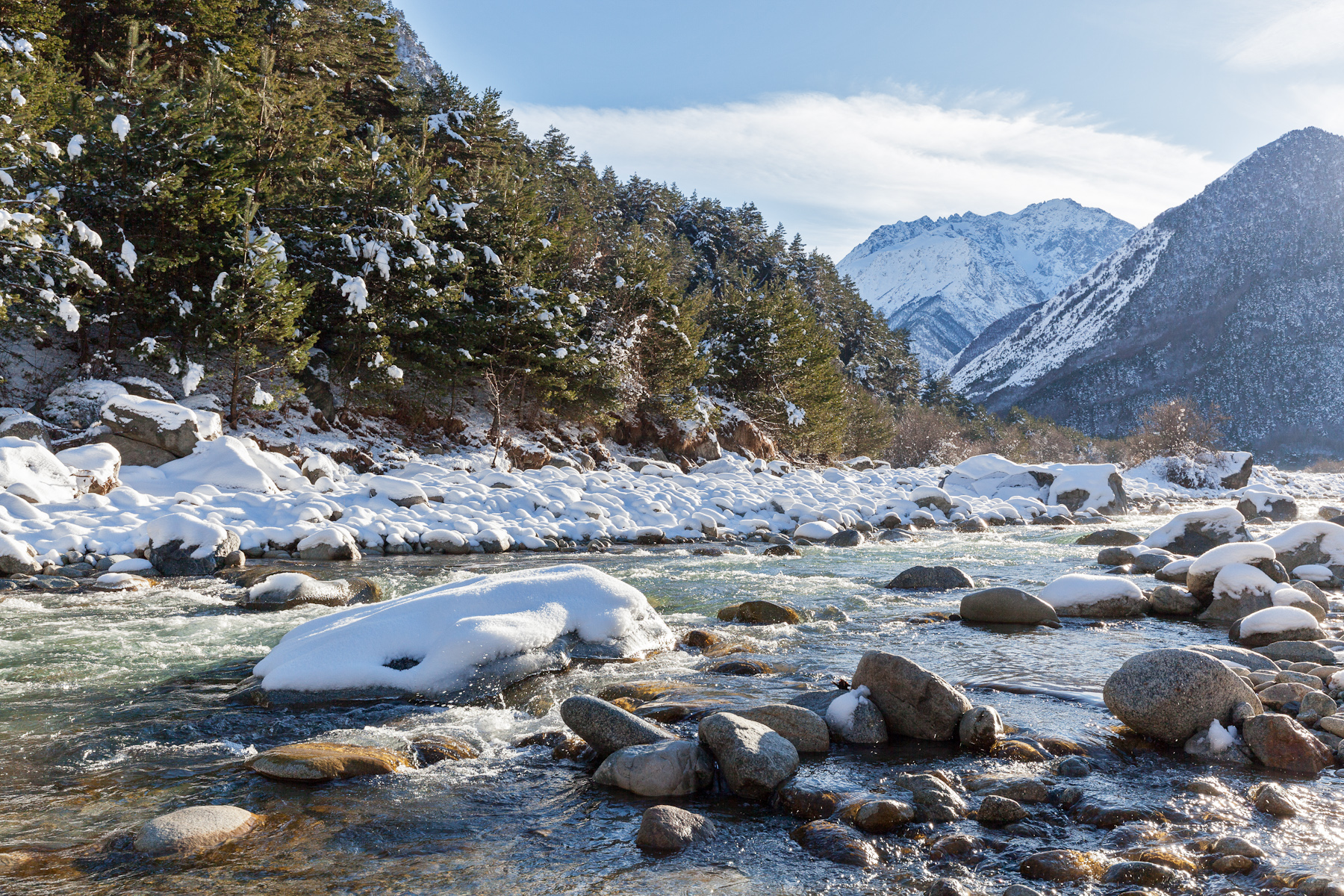

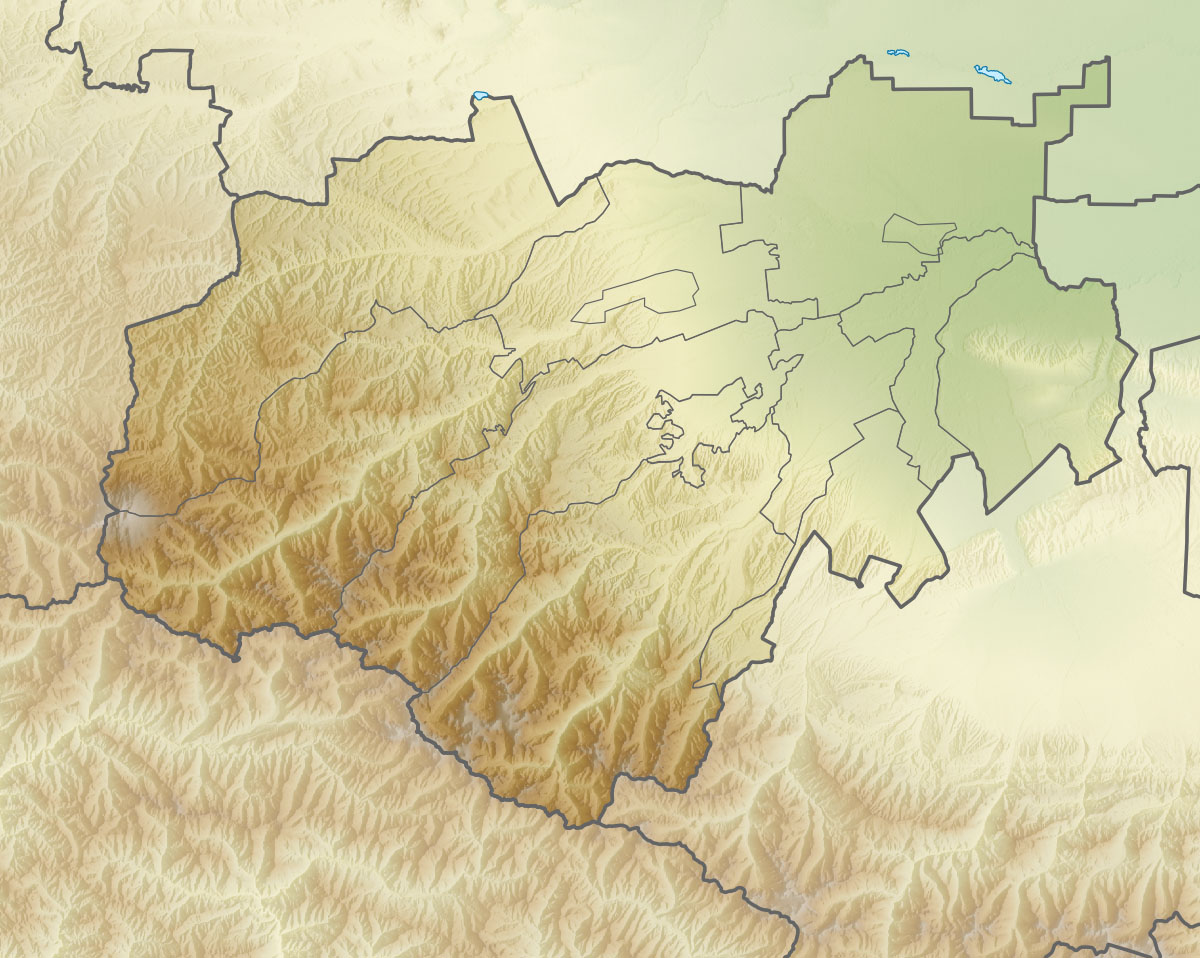
- Location within Kabardino-Balkaria Location within Caucasus Mountains

Location
- Country: Russia
- Federal subjects: North Ossetia–Alania, Kabardino-Balkaria

Physical characteristics
- Source
  - location: Greater Caucasus
- Mouth: Terek
  - coordinates: 43°27′22″N 44°06′26″E
- Length: 104 km (65 mi)
- Basin size: 1,280 km^{2} (490 sq mi)

Basin features
- Progression: Terek→ Caspian Sea

The Urukh (Russian: Урух, Iron Ossetic: Ирӕф / Ӕрӕф, romanized: Irӕf / Ӕrӕf), known as Kharves in its upper reaches, is a river in North Ossetia–Alania and Kabardino-Balkaria (Russia), which flows northeast to join the Terek as a left tributary northwest of Vladikavkaz. The length of the Urukh is 104 km, the area of its drainage basin is 1280 km². The Urukh originates in the glaciers of the Greater Caucasus. The river freezes up in December and remains icebound until March.
