= Aleksei Semyonov (footballer, born 1983) =

Russian footballer

Personal information
- Full name: Aleksei Vladimirovich Semyonov
- Date of birth: 12 April 1983 (age 43)
- Place of birth: Leningrad, Russian SFSR
- Height: 1.76 m (5 ft 9 in)
- Position: Midfielder

Senior career*
Years	Team	Apps	(Gls)
2000–2003	FC Svetogorets Svetogorsk	69	(6)
2004	FC Dynamo Vologda	28	(9)
2005	FC Volga Nizhny Novgorod	30	(3)
2006–2007	FC SKA-Energiya Khabarovsk	47	(2)
2007	FC Khimki	2	(0)
2008–2009	FC Nosta Novotroitsk	44	(7)
2009–2010	FC Baltika Kaliningrad	48	(6)
2011–2012	FC SKA-Energiya Khabarovsk	32	(0)
2012–2013	FC Petrotrest Saint Petersburg	22	(1)
2013	FC Salyut Belgorod	20	(0)
2014	FC Tambov	4	(0)
2014	FC SKChF Sevastopol	0	(0)
- * Club domestic league appearances and goals

Aleksei Vladimirovich Semyonov (Russian: Алексей Владимирович Семёнов; born 12 April 1983) is a Russian former professional footballer.

== Club career ==
He made his debut in the Russian Premier League in 2007 for FC Khimki.
