= Sergei Danilov =

Russian professional football player

Personal information
- Full name: Sergei Aleksandrovich Danilov
- Date of birth: 1 July 1989 (age 37)
- Place of birth: Kuybyshev, Russian SFSR
- Height: 1.80 m (5 ft 11 in)
- Position: Midfielder

Youth career
- –2005: FC Krylia Sovetov Samara

Senior career*
Years	Team	Apps	(Gls)
2006–2007	FC Krylia Sovetov Samara	0	(0)
2008	FC Academia Dimitrovgrad	32	(3)
2009	FC Togliatti	25	(4)
2010–2012	FC Akademiya Togliatti	47	(9)
2012–2013	FC Ufa	31	(0)
2014–2015	FC Tyumen	34	(1)
2015–2017	FC Zenit-Izhevsk	39	(1)
2017	FC Syzran-2003	9	(0)
2018	FC Kolkheti-1913 Poti	15	(0)
2018–2019	FC Syzran-2003	21	(0)
2019	FC Volgar Astrakhan	5	(0)
2020	FC Mashuk-KMV Pyatigorsk	16	(1)
2021	FC Zenit Penza	3	(0)
- * Club domestic league appearances and goals

Sergei Aleksandrovich Danilov (Russian: Серге́й Александрович Данилов; born 1 July 1989) is a Russian former professional football player.

== Club career ==
He made his Russian Football National League debut for FC Ufa on 9 July 2012 in a game against PFC Spartak Nalchik.
