= Igor Khaymanov =

Russian footballer

Personal information
- Full name: Igor Anatolyevich Khaymanov
- Date of birth: 26 March 1994 (age 32)
- Place of birth: Vladikavkaz, Russia
- Height: 1.90 m (6 ft 3 in)
- Positions: Defender; midfielder

Senior career*
Years	Team	Apps	(Gls)
2012	Alania-d Vladikavkaz	7	(1)
2012–2013	Alania Vladikavkaz	3	(0)
2014	Lokomotiv Liski	9	(0)
2015	Avangard Kursk	11	(0)
2016	Alania Vladikavkaz	8	(0)
2016–2017	Afips Afipsky	27	(8)
2017–2018	Fakel Voronezh	38	(0)
2018	Tyumen	14	(0)
2019	KAMAZ Naberezhnye Chelny	4	(0)
2019–2020	Fakel Voronezh	16	(0)
2020–2021	Dynamo Bryansk	10	(0)
2021	Druzhba Maykop	6	(0)
2022	Arsenal Dzerzhinsk	7	(0)
2023	Guria Lanchkhuti		
2023–2024	Kompozit Pavlovsky Posad	14	(1)
- * Club domestic league appearances and goals as of 3 November 2024

Igor Anatolyevich Khaymanov (Russian: Игорь Анатольевич Хайманов; born 26 March 1994) is a Russian football player.

== Club career ==
He made his debut in the Russian Second Division for FC Alania-d Vladikavkaz on 26 April 2012 in a game against FC FAYUR Beslan.

He made his Russian Premier League debut for FC Alania Vladikavkaz on 26 May 2013 in a game against FC Spartak Moscow.
