= Albert Tskhovrebov =

Russian footballer

Personal information
- Full name: Albert Inalovich Tskhovrebov
- Date of birth: 1 May 1993 (age 33)
- Place of birth: Vladikavkaz, Russia
- Height: 1.94 m (6 ft 4 in)
- Position: Centre back

Youth career
- FC Alania Vladikavkaz

Senior career*
Years	Team	Apps	(Gls)
2010–2011	FC Alania Vladikavkaz	7	(0)
2012	FC Alania-d Vladikavkaz	8	(1)
2012–2013	FC Alania Vladikavkaz	20	(1)
2014–2015	FC Tosno	16	(1)
2015	FC Shukura Kobuleti	7	(0)
2016	FC Yenisey Krasnoyarsk	7	(0)
2016–2017	FC Kuban-Holding Pavlovskaya (amateur)		
2018	FC Rustavi	11	(0)
2019–2020	FC Kuban-Holding Pavlovskaya (amateur)		
2020–2022	FC Kuban-Holding Pavlovskaya	38	(2)
- * Club domestic league appearances and goals

Albert Inalovich Tskhovrebov (Russian: Альберт Иналович Цховребов; born 1 May 1993) is a Russian former professional football player.

== Club career ==
He made his Russian Football National League debut for FC Alania Vladikavkaz on 7 April 2011 in a game against FC Nizhny Novgorod.
