= Irafsky District =

Irafsky District Ирафский район (Russian)
- District

Other transcription(s)
  - Ossetic: Ирæфи район
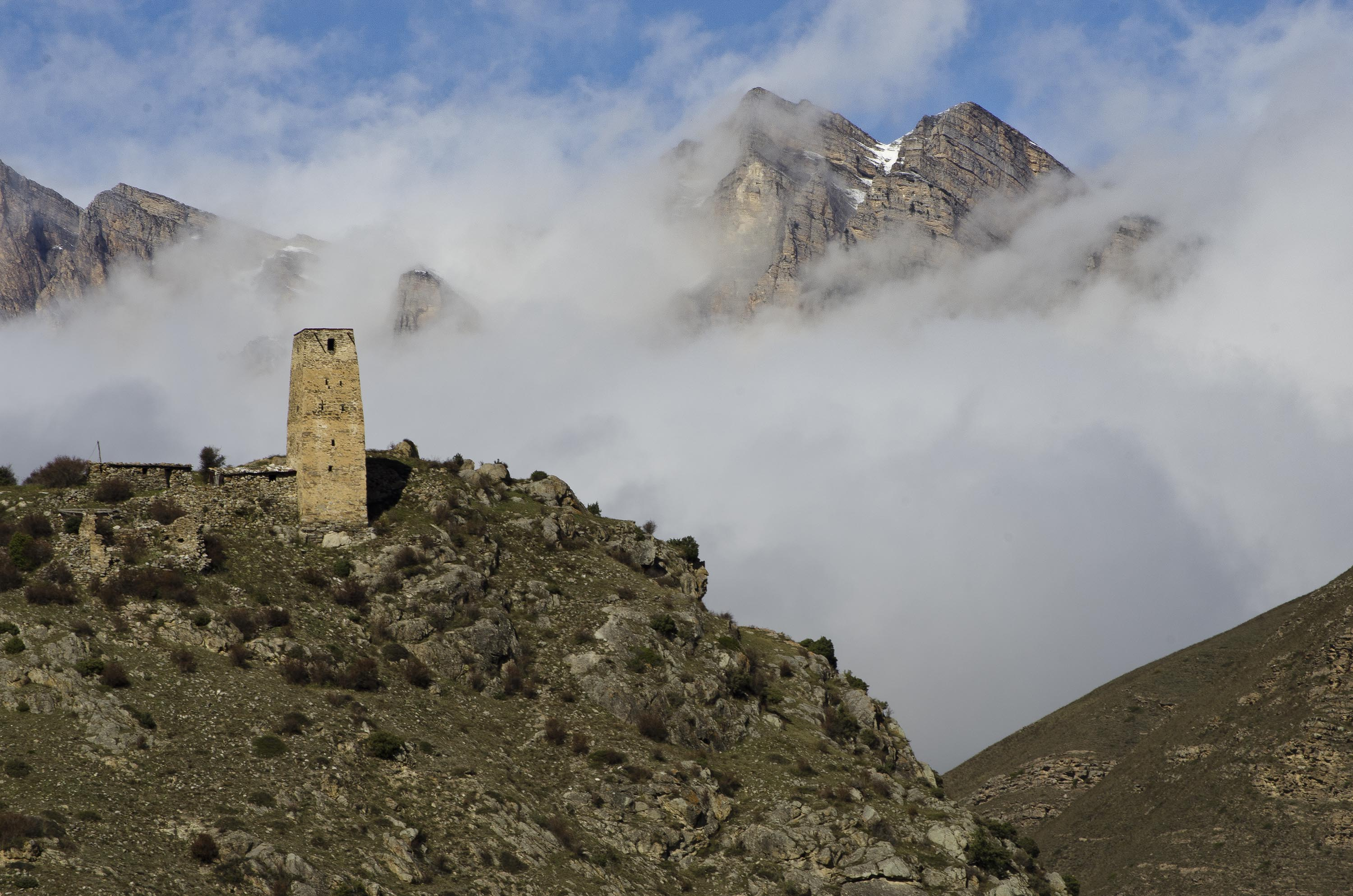
- Mountains in Alaniya National Park, Irafsky District
- Location of Irafsky District in the Republic of North Ossetia–Alania
- Coordinates: 43°11′29″N 43°55′06″E
- Country: Russia
- Federal subject: Republic of North Ossetia–Alania
- Administrative center: Chikola

Area
  - Total: 1,376 km^{2} (531 sq mi)

Population (2010 Census)
  - Total: 15,766
  - Density: 11.46/km^{2} (29.68/sq mi)
  - Urban: 0%
  - Rural: 100%

Administrative structure
  - Administrative divisions: 14 rural okrug
  - Inhabited localities: 36 rural localities

Municipal structure
  - Municipally incorporated as: Irafsky Municipal District
  - Municipal divisions: 0 urban settlements, 14 rural settlements
- Time zone: UTC+3 (MSK)
- OKTMO ID: 90620000
- Website: http://amsiraf.ru/

Irafsky District (Russian: Ирафский район; Iron Ossetic: Ирæфи район, romanized: Iræfi rajon) is an administrative and municipal district (raion), one of the eight in the Republic of North Ossetia–Alania, Russia. It is located in the west of the republic. The area of the district is 1,376 square kilometers (531 sq mi). Its administrative center is the rural locality (a selo) of Chikola. Population: 15,766 (2010 census); 15,708 (2002 Census); 15,732 (1989 Soviet census). The population of Chikola accounts for 44.5% of the district's total population.
