= Stanislav Lebamba =

Russian footballer

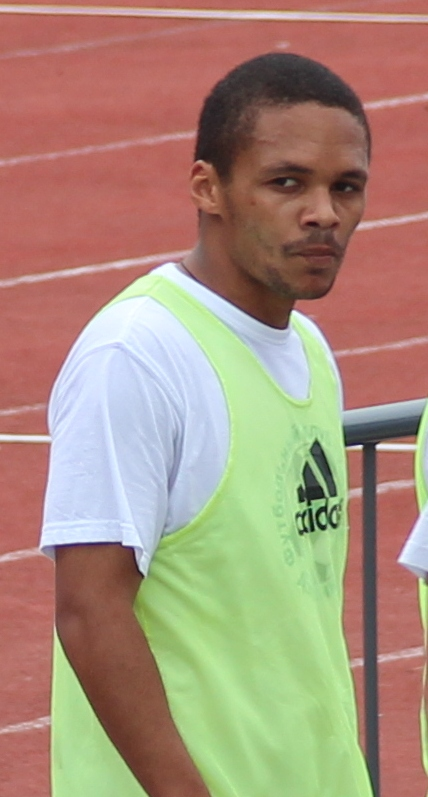

Personal information
- Full name: Stanislav Marselyevich Lebamba
- Date of birth: 21 April 1988 (age 38)
- Place of birth: Oryol, Russian SFSR
- Height: 1.74 m (5 ft 9 in)
- Position: Right back

Senior career*
| Years | Team | Apps | (Gls) |
| 2005–2012 | FC KAMAZ Naberezhnye Chelny | 52 | (0) |
| 2008 | → FC Gubkin (loan) | 34 | (1) |
| 2009 | → FC Mordovia Saransk (loan) | 24 | (2) |
| 2012–2014 | FC Yenisey Krasnoyarsk | 50 | (0) |
| 2014 | FC Khimik Dzerzhinsk | 11 | (0) |
| 2015 | FC Saturn Ramenskoye | 6 | (0) |
| 2015–2017 | FC KAMAZ Naberezhnye Chelny | 42 | (0) |
| 2017 | FK Liepāja | 12 | (0) |
| 2018–2019 | BFC Daugavpils | | |
- * Club domestic league appearances and goals

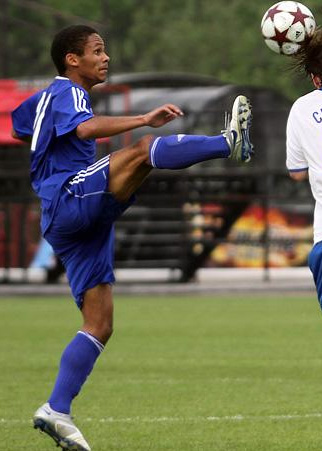
Stanislav Lebamba in 2010

Stanislav Marselyevich Lebamba (Russian: Станислав Марсельевич Лебамба; born 21 April 1988) is a Russian former a professional football player.

== Club career ==
He played 8 seasons in the Russian Football National League for FC KAMAZ Naberezhnye Chelny, FC Yenisey Krasnoyarsk and FC Khimik Dzerzhinsk.

== Personal life ==
His father is from DR Congo and his mother is Russian.
