= Grigori Guz =

Russian footballer

Personal information
- Full name: Grigori Petrovich Guz
- Date of birth: 5 January 1985 (age 41)
- Height: 1.76 m (5 ft 9 1/2 in)
- Positions: Midfielder; defender

Senior career*
Years	Team	Apps	(Gls)
2002	FC Torpedo Volzhsky	15	(1)
2003	FC Krasnodar-2000	0	(0)
2003	FC Kavkazkabel Prokhladny	31	(1)
2004	FC Druzhba Maykop	22	(0)
2005	FC Chkalovets Novosibirsk	7	(1)
2006	FC Alnas Almetyevsk	12	(1)
2007–2008	FC Krasnodar-2000	46	(10)
2009	FC Stavropolye-2009	32	(2)
2010–2012	FC Angusht Nazran	64	(6)
2012	FC Mashuk-KMV Pyatigorsk	18	(1)
2013–2014	FC Angusht Nazran	42	(1)
2014–2015	PFC Spartak Nalchik	27	(1)
- * Club domestic league appearances and goals

Grigori Petrovich Guz (Russian: Григорий Петрович Гузь; born 5 January 1985) is a former Russian professional football player.

== Club career ==
He played in the Russian Football National League for FC Angusht Nazran in the 2013–14 season.
