= Andrei Gatsko =

Russian footballer

Personal information
- Full name: Andrei Sergeyevich Gatsko
- Date of birth: 11 September 1986 (age 40)
- Height: 1.83 m (6 ft 0 in)
- Positions: Midfielder; forward

Senior career*
| Years | Team | Apps | (Gls) |
| 2004 | FC Slavyansk Slavyansk-na-Kubani | 10 | (0) |
| 2005–2007 | FC Mashuk-KMV Pyatigorsk | 37 | (0) |
| 2008 | FC Krasnodar | 30 | (9) |
| 2009 | FC Rotor Volgograd | 16 | (2) |
| 2009–2010 | FC Sheksna Cherepovets | 43 | (8) |
| 2011–2012 | FC Torpedo Vladimir | 37 | (6) |
| 2012–2015 | FC Baltika Kaliningrad | 66 | (3) |
| 2015–2016 | FC Torpedo Vladimir | 25 | (2) |
| 2016–2017 | FC Sochi | 23 | (1) |
| 2017–2018 | FC Chita | 13 | (1) |
- * Club domestic league appearances and goals

Andrei Sergeyevich Gatsko (Russian: Андрей Серге́евич Гацко; born 11 September 1986) is a Russian former professional football player.

== Club career ==
He played 6 seasons in the Russian Football National League for FC Mashuk-KMV Pyatigorsk, FC Torpedo Vladimir and FC Baltika Kaliningrad.
