= Zaurbek Olisayev =

Russian-Ossetian footballer

Personal information
- Full name: Zaurbek Olegovich Olisayev
- Date of birth: 2 February 1994 (age 32)
- Place of birth: Vladikavkaz, Russia
- Height: 1.82 m (5 ft 11 1/2 in)
- Position: Forward

Team information
- Current team: SSh 75 Moscow

Senior career*
Years	Team	Apps	(Gls)
2012	FC Alania Vladikavkaz	0	(0)
2013	FC Torpedo Armavir	17	(0)
2014–2015	FC Neftekhimik Nizhnekamsk	11	(0)
2015	FC MITOS Novocherkassk	13	(0)
2016	FC Spartak Vladikavkaz	5	(0)
2017	FC Dacia Chișinău	19	(3)
2019–	SSh 75 Moscow		
- * Club domestic league appearances and goals as of 26 November 2017

Zaurbek Olegovich Olisayev (Russian: Заурбек Олегович Олисаев; born 2 February 1994) is a Russian-Ossetian professional football player. He plays for SSh 75 Moscow.

== Club career ==
He made his debut for the senior squad of FC Alania Vladikavkaz in the 2012–13 Russian Cup game against FC Tyumen on 27 September 2012.
