= Zaurbek Kambolov =

Russian-Ossetian footballer

Personal information
- Full name: Zaurbek Olegovich Kambolov
- Date of birth: 4 March 1992 (age 34)
- Place of birth: Vladikavkaz, Russia
- Height: 1.77 m (5 ft 10 in)
- Position: Right winger

Senior career*
Years	Team	Apps	(Gls)
2010–2012	FC FAYUR Beslan	59	(8)
2012–2013	FC Alania Vladikavkaz	6	(0)
2013	→ FC Alania-d Vladikavkaz	9	(0)
2014–2015	FC SKA-Energiya Khabarovsk	12	(0)
2016–2019	FC Spartak Vladikavkaz	78	(8)
2020–2021	FC Mashuk-KMV Pyatigorsk	23	(3)
2021–2022	FC Tuapse	26	(3)
- * Club domestic league appearances and goals

Zaurbek Olegovich Kambolov (Russian: Заурбек Олегович Камболов; born 4 March 1992) is a Russian-Ossetian former professional football player.

== Club career ==
He made his Russian Premier League debut for FC Alania Vladikavkaz on 4 August 2012 in a game against FC Terek Grozny.
