= Batraz Khadartsev =

Russian footballer

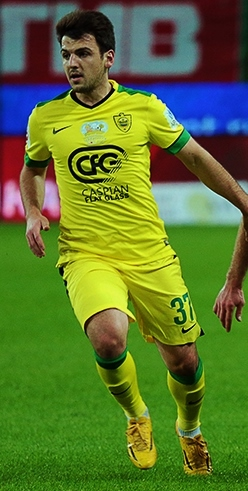
- Khadartsev with Anzhi in 2015

Personal information
- Full name: Batraz Soslanovich Khadartsev
- Date of birth: 23 May 1993 (age 33)
- Place of birth: Vladikavkaz, Russia
- Height: 1.73 m (5 ft 8 in)
- Position: Midfielder

Youth career
- Yunost Vladikavkaz

Senior career*
Years	Team	Apps	(Gls)
2011–2012	CSKA Moscow	0	(0)
2012–2013	Alania Vladikavkaz	20	(2)
2014–2015	FC Tosno	31	(7)
2015–2017	Anzhi Makhachkala	19	(0)
2018	FC Rustavi	7	(1)
2018	Spartak Vladikavkaz	7	(0)
2019	Baltika Kaliningrad	8	(0)
2019–2024	Alania Vladikavkaz	106	(30)

International career^{‡}
2014	Russia U-21	1	(0)
- * Club domestic league appearances and goals as of 29 November 2024 ‡ National team caps and goals as of 24 January 2014

Batraz Soslanovich Khadartsev (Russian: Батраз Сосланович Хадарцев; born 23 May 1993) is a Russian professional football player who plays as a left midfielder.

== Career ==
He played for FC Alania Vladikavkaz in the 2012–13 Russian Cup game against FC Tyumen on 27 September 2012. He made his Russian Football National League debut for Alania on 7 July 2013 in a game against FC Ufa.

On 26 June 2015, Khadartsev signed a three-year contract with FC Anzhi Makhachkala. He made his Russian Premier League debut for Anzhi on 19 July 2015 in a game against PFC Krylia Sovetov Samara.

== Career statistics ==
=== Club ===
As of 9 December 2017

Club	Season	League			Cup		Continental		Other		Total	
Club	Season	Division	Apps	Goals	Apps	Goals	Apps	Goals	Apps	Goals	Apps	Goals
PFC CSKA Moscow	2011–12	Russian Premier League	0	0	0	0	0	0	–		0	0
PFC CSKA Moscow	2012–13	Russian Premier League	0	0	0	0	0	0	–		0	0
PFC CSKA Moscow	Total		0	0	0	0	0	0	0	0	0	0
FC Alania Vladikavkaz	2012–13	Russian Premier League	0	0	1	0	–		–		1	0
FC Alania Vladikavkaz	2013–14	FNL	20	2	2	0	–		–		22	2
FC Alania Vladikavkaz	Total		20	2	3	0	0	0	0	0	23	2
FC Tosno	2014–15	FNL	31	7	3	2	–		2 (Note: Two appearances in promotion play-offs)	0	36	9
FC Anzhi Makhachkala	2015–16	Russian Premier League	15	0	2	0	–		–		17	0
FC Anzhi Makhachkala	2016–17	Russian Premier League	4	0	0	0	–		–		4	0
FC Anzhi Makhachkala	2017–18	Russian Premier League	0	0	1	0	–		–		1	0
FC Anzhi Makhachkala	Total		19	0	3	0	0	0	0	0	22	0
Career total			70	9	9	2	0	0	2	0	81	11
