= Chikola, Russia =

Rural locality in North Ossetia–Alania, Russia

Chikola Чикола
- Town

Other transcription(s)
  - Ossetic: Цыкола
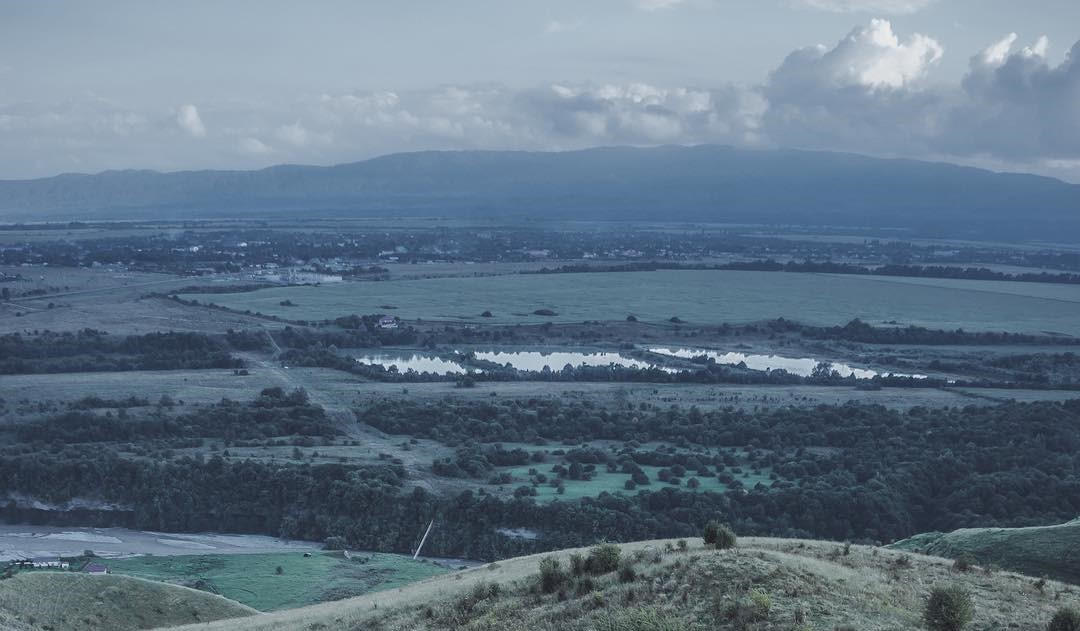
- Chikola, Russia

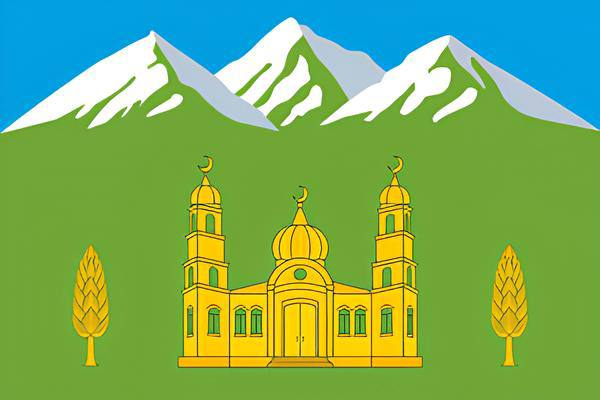
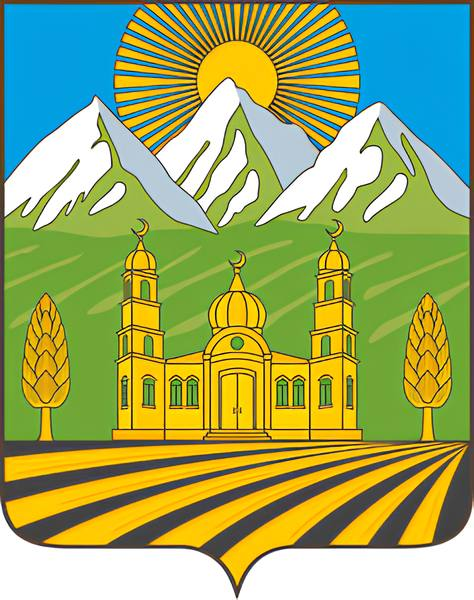
- Flag Coat of arms
- Interactive map of Chikola
- Location of Chikola Chikola (North Ossetia–Alania)
- Coordinates: 43°11′41″N 43°55′09″E
- Country: Russia
- Federal subject: North Ossetia–Alania
- Administrative district: Irafsky District
- Town Under District JurisdictionSelsoviet: Chikola
- Founded: 1852

Area
  - Total: 16.30 km^{2} (6.29 sq mi)
- Elevation: 670 m (2,200 ft)

Population (2010 Census)
  - Total: 6,757
  - Estimate (2025): 7,297 (+8%)
  - Density: 414.5/km^{2} (1,074/sq mi)

Administrative status
  - Capital of: Irafsky District, Chikola Town Under District Jurisdiction
- Time zone: UTC+3 (MSK)
- Postal code: 363500
- Dialing code: +7 86734
- OKTMO ID: 90620470101

Chikola (Russian: Чикола) or Tsykola (Iron Ossetic: Цыкола, romanized: Cykola, IPA: [t͡sɘˈkoɫa]) is a rural locality (a selo) and the administrative center of Irafsky District of the Republic of North Ossetia–Alania, Russia. Population: 7,017 (2010 census); 7,017 (2002 census); 6,723 (1989 Soviet census).

== Notable people ==
- Khadzhimurat Gatsalov – Ossetian freestyle wrestler and Olympic medalist
- Soslanbek Arshiyev – footballer
