= Azat Bayryev =

Russian football player

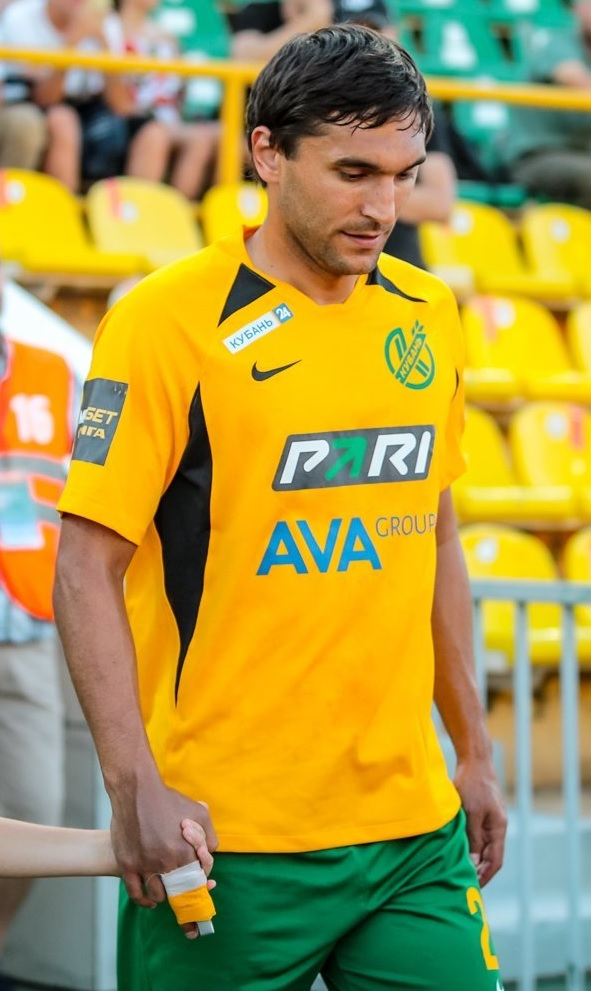
- Bayryev with Kuban Krasnodar in 2022

Personal information
- Full name: Azat Khodzhageldyevich Bayryev
- Date of birth: 17 February 1989 (age 37)
- Place of birth: Nebit-Dag, Turkmen SSR, USSR
- Height: 1.91 m (6 ft 3 in)
- Position: Centre back

Senior career*
Years	Team	Apps	(Gls)
2006–2011	FC Kuban Krasnodar	39	(0)
2010	→ FC Salyut Belgorod (loan)	17	(0)
2011	→ FC Dynamo Bryansk (loan)	34	(3)
2012–2013	FC Alania Vladikavkaz	45	(0)
2014	FC SKA-Energiya Khabarovsk	9	(1)
2014	FC Zenit Penza	14	(1)
2015–2016	FC Volgar Astrakhan	36	(5)
2016–2018	FC Kuban Krasnodar	62	(3)
2018–2022	FC Rotor Volgograd	89	(5)
2022–2025	FC Kuban Krasnodar	35	(2)

International career
2008	Russia U-19	3	(1)
2008–2009	Russia U-21	1	(0)
- * Club domestic league appearances and goals

Azat Khodzhageldyevich Bayryev (Russian: Азат Ходжагельдыевич Байрыев; Turkmen: Azat Hojageldyýewiç Baýryýew; born 17 February 1989) is a Russian former football player.

== Club career ==
He made his debut in the Russian Premier League for FC Kuban Krasnodar on 14 March 2009 in a game against FC Rubin Kazan.

While with FC Rotor Volgograd, Bayryev was voted the second-best FNL player for the month of November 2019, after amassing the greatest number of duels won and scoring the game-winning goal in the last match of the month.

== Personal life ==
Azat was born in Turkmen SSR. His father is of Turkmen origin, and his mother is Russian. At the age of five he moved to Russian Federation.
