= Republican Spartak Stadium =

Football stadium in Vladikavkaz, Russia

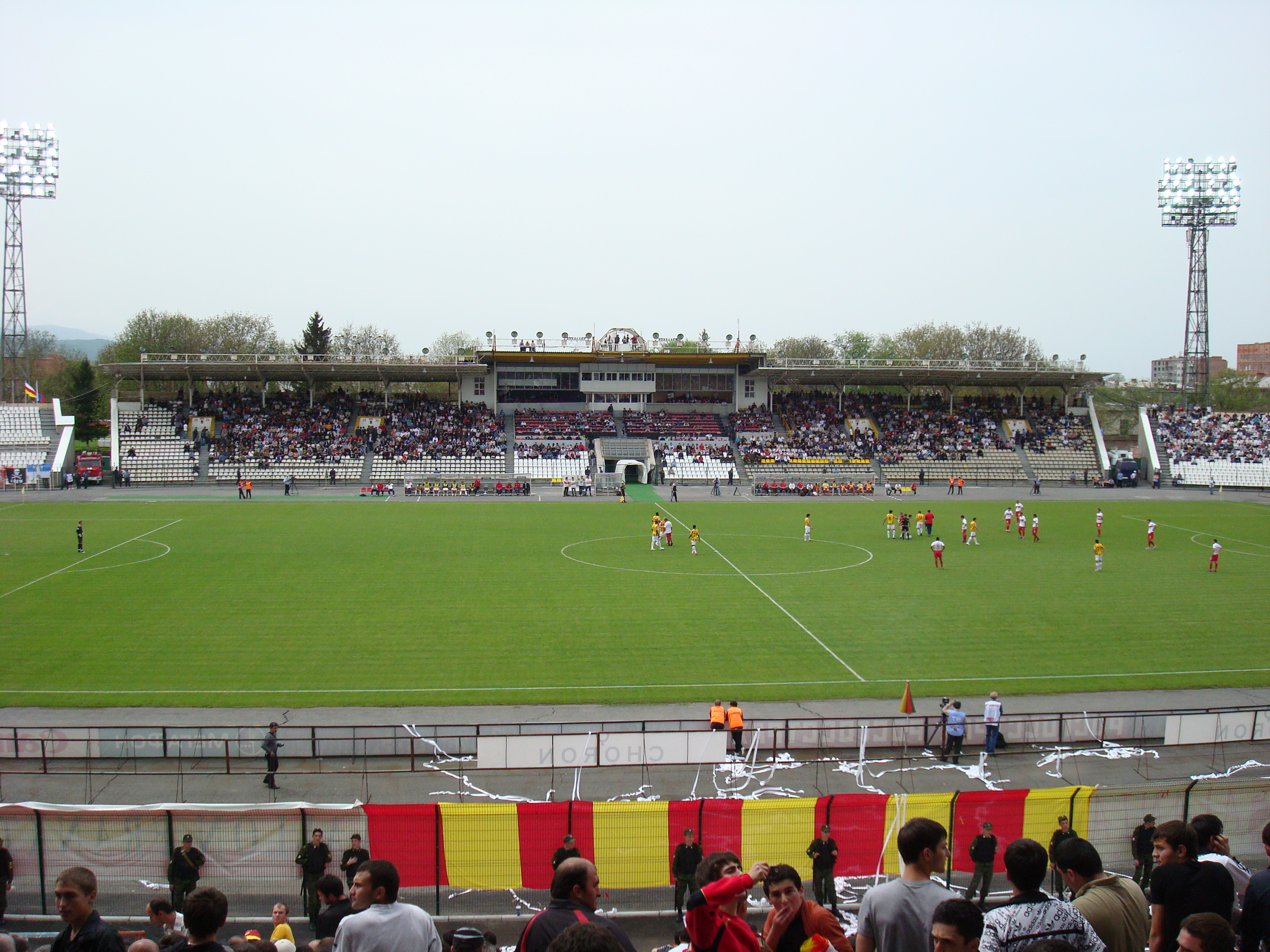
- The stadium in 2010
- Interactive map of Republican Spartak Stadium
- Location: Vladikavkaz, Russia
- Coordinates: 43°1′23″N 44°41′42″E
- Capacity: 32,464

Construction
- Opened: 1962
- Renovated: 2004

Tenant
- FC Spartak Vladikavkaz

Republican Spartak Stadium (Russian: Республиканский стадион "Спартак") is a multi-purpose stadium in Vladikavkaz, Russia. It is currently used mostly for football matches. The stadium was built in 1962 and is able to hold 32,464 people. It is the home ground for FC Spartak Vladikavkaz.
