= FC Alania-2 Vladikavkaz =

- Full name: Football Club Alania-2 Vladikavkaz
- Founded: 2011
- Dissolved: 2025
- Ground: Republican Spartak Stadium
- Capacity: 32,364
- Chairman: Ruslan Siukayev
- Manager: Aslan Zaseev
- League: TBC
- 2024: Russian Second League, Division B, Group 1, 16th (relegated)

FC Alania-2 Vladikavkaz (Russian: «ФК Алания-2» Владикавказ) was a Russian football team from Vladikavkaz, founded in 2011. It played from 2011 to 2013–14 seasons in the third-tier Russian Second League, re-entered the league once again for the 2021–22 season and played in it until the end of the 2024 season.

== Club history ==
Alania-2 is the reserves team of FC Alania Vladikavkaz. Reserves teams of the Russian Premier League clubs participate in a separate competition, where this team played in 2010. After Alania was relegated to the Russian First Division, Alania-2 entered into the Russian Second Division. Alania's reserves played on the professional level before, as FC Spartak-d Vladikavkaz (Russian Third League in 1995), FC Alania-d Vladikavkaz (Russian Third League in 1997) and FC Alania-2 Vladikavkaz (Russian Second Division in 1998).

During the 2013–14 season, the parent team Alania went bankrupt and was liquidated. Before the 2014–15 season, Alania-d was renamed to FC Alania Vladikavkaz.

Before the 2021–22 season, Alania's farm club was registered once again for the FNL 2, as Alania-2. The team was relegated out of professional level at the end of the 2024 season.

== See also ==
- FC Alania Vladikavkaz
