= 2014–15 FC Sakhalin Yuzhno-Sakhalinsk season =

Sakhalin Yuzhno-Sakhalinsk
2014–15 season
- Chairman: Andrei Ikramov
- Manager: Fail Mirgalimov; 26 January 2015; Igor Dobrovolski from 26 January 2015
- Stadium: Spartak Stadium
- National Football League: 16th
- Russian Cup: Fourth round vs Luch-Energiya Vladivostok
- National League Cup: 11th
- Top goalscorer: League: Nikita Satalkin (9); All: Nikita Satalkin (9)
Home colours	Away colours	Third colours

The 2014–15 FC Sakhalin Yuzhno-Sakhalinsk season was the club's first season in the National Football League, the second tier in Russian football, after winning the 2013–14 Russian Professional Football League East Division. They entered the Russian Cup at the Fourth Round stage where they were eliminated by Luch-Energiya Vladivostok. It is their first season with Fail Mirgalimov as their manager after he was appointed as Head Coach on 1 July 2014. Miraglimov had his contract terminated by mutual consent in January 2015, with Igor Dobrovolski taking over as manager on 26 January.

== Squad ==
As of 3 February 2015, according to the official FNL website. Note: Flags indicate national team as defined under FIFA eligibility rules; some limited exceptions apply. Players may hold more than one non-FIFA nationality.

No.	Pos.	Nation	Player
3	DF	RUS	Murtazi Alakhverdov
5	DF	RUS	Mikhail Mischenko
7	MF	RUS	Aleksandr Gagloyev
9	MF	RUS	Vladimir Mikhalyov
11	MF	RUS	Sergei Vinogradov
12	GK	RUS	Andrei Kondratyuk
13	MF	RUS	Nikita Drozdov
15	FW	RUS	Georgy Gogichayev
16	GK	RUS	Aleksandr Khoroshilov
17	MF	RUS	Eldar Mamayev
19	GK	RUS	Yevgeni Frolov
20	MF	RUS	Vadim Khinchagov
21	DF	RUS	Aleksei Korbut
22	FW	RUS	Nikita Satalkin

No.	Pos.	Nation	Player
24	MF	RUS	Yevgeni Dudikov
27	MF	GEO	Giorgi Kakhelishvili
28	DF	RUS	Andrei Semyonov
29	MF	RUS	Aleksandr Ilyin
30	MF	GEO	Gocha Khojava
35	FW	BLR	Vital Bulyga
40	MF	RUS	Yuri Kuleshov
44	DF	RUS	Nikita Chicherin
50	MF	RUS	Artyom Voronkin
57	DF	RUS	Artyom Kazakov
60	MF	MDA	Nicolae Josan
85	DF	RUS	Nikita Chicherin
99	FW	RUS	Yevgeni Kobzar

== Transfers ==
=== Summer ===
In: Note: Flags indicate national team as defined under FIFA eligibility rules; some limited exceptions apply. Players may hold more than one non-FIFA nationality.

No.	Pos.	Nation	Player
1	GK	RUS	Aleksandr Samokhvalov (from (Russia) Dynamo St.Petersburg)
5	DF	RUS	Mikhail Mischenko (from (Russia) Sokol Saratov)
8	MF	RUS	Artyom Bludnov (from (Russia) Tekstilshchik Ivanovo)
10	MF	UKR	Denys Skepskyi (from (Russia) Torpedo Moscow)
13	MF	RUS	Nikita Drozdov (from (Russia) Amur-2010 Blagoveshchensk)
15	FW	RUS	Georgy Gogichayev (from (Russia) Alania-d Vladikavkaz)
17	MF	RUS	Eldar Mamayev (from (Russia) Sever Murmansk)
19	GK	RUS	Yevgeni Frolov (from (Russia) Dynamo Moscow)
22	FW	RUS	Nikita Satalkin (from (Russia) Gazovik Orenburg)
23	DF	RUS	Levan Dzharkava (from (Russia) Vityaz Krymsk)
24	DF	RUS	Yevgeni Dudikov (from (Russia) Zvezda Ryazan)
25	DF	RUS	Vasili Pyanchenko (loan from (Russia) Yenisey Krasnoyarsk)
27	MF	GEO	Giorgi Kakhelishvili (from (Georgia (country)) Sioni Bolnisi)
28	DF	RUS	Andrei Semyonov (from (Russia) Lokomotiv-2 Moscow)
29	MF	RUS	Aleksandr Ilyin (loan from (Russia) Dynamo Moscow)
30	MF	GEO	Gocha Khojava (from (Cyprus) AEK Larnaca)
33	MF	UKR	Kostyantyn Parkhomenko (from (Ukraine) Stal Dniprodzerzhynsk)
55	MF	GEO	Zurab Arziani (from (Russia) Gazovik Orenburg)
78	MF	RUS	Andrei Mikheyev (from (Russia) Rotor Volgograd)
89	DF	RUS	Anton Rudakov (from (Russia) Avangard Kursk)
99	FW	RUS	Yevgeni Kobzar (from (Russia) Lokomotiv-2 Moscow)

Out: Note: Flags indicate national team as defined under FIFA eligibility rules; some limited exceptions apply. Players may hold more than one non-FIFA nationality.

No.	Pos.	Nation	Player
25	DF	RUS	Vasili Pyanchenko (loan return to (Russia) Yenisey Krasnoyarsk)
—	DF	RUS	Sergei Chernetsov (to (Russia) Saturn Ramenskoye)
—	DF	RUS	Deviko Khinchagov (to (Russia) MITOS Novocherkassk)
—	DF	RUS	Sergei Kolychev (to (Russia) Zenit Penza)
—	DF	RUS	Maksim Sargsyan
—	MF	RUS	Abumuslim Bogatyryov (to (Russia) Lokomotiv Liski)
—	MF	RUS	Sergei Dudkin (loan return to (Russia) Luch-Energiya Vladivostok)
—	MF	RUS	Andrei Klimenko (to (Russia) Dynamo Barnaul)
—	MF	RUS	Andriano Kokoskeriya (to (Russia) Sochi)
—	MF	RUS	Maksim Korshunov (to (Russia) Metallurg Novokuznetsk)
—	FW	RUS	Fyodor Pervushin (to (Russia) Dynamo Barnaul)
—	MF	RUS	Pavel Rozhkov (to (Russia) Zenit Penza)
—	FW	RUS	Sergei Sharin (to (Russia) Vityaz Podolsk)
—	FW	RUS	Yakov Ehrlich

=== Winter ===
In: Note: Flags indicate national team as defined under FIFA eligibility rules; some limited exceptions apply. Players may hold more than one non-FIFA nationality.

No.	Pos.	Nation	Player
20	MF	RUS	Vadim Khinchagov
35	FW	BLR	Vital Bulyga
40	MF	RUS	Yuri Kuleshov (from (Russia) Torpedo Moscow)
44	DF	RUS	Nikita Chicherin (from (Russia) Tom Tomsk)
50	MF	RUS	Artyom Voronkin (from (Russia) Gazovik Orenburg)
57	DF	RUS	Artyom Kazakov (from (Russia) Dnepr Smolensk)
60	MF	MDA	Nicolae Josan (from (Moldova) Veris Chișinău)
85	DF	RUS	Artyom Kazakov (from (Russia) Dnepr Smolensk)
—	DF	RUS	Anton Grigoryev (Trial)
—	MF	CMR	Gaël Ondoua (Trial)

Out: Note: Flags indicate national team as defined under FIFA eligibility rules; some limited exceptions apply. Players may hold more than one non-FIFA nationality.

No.	Pos.	Nation	Player
1	GK	RUS	Aleksandr Samokhvalov
8	MF	RUS	Artyom Bludnov (to (Russia) Neftekhimik Nizhnekamsk)
10	MF	UKR	Denys Skepskyi (to (Ukraine) Desna Chernihiv)
23	DF	RUS	Levan Dzharkava (to (Armenia) Ulisses)
33	MF	UKR	Kostyantyn Parkhomenko
55	MF	GEO	Zurab Arziani (to (Hungary) Nyíregyháza Spartacus)
78	MF	RUS	Andrei Mikheyev (to (Russia) Torpedo Armavir)
89	DF	RUS	Anton Rudakov

== Friendlies ==
30 January 2015	Sakhalin Yuzhno-Sakhalinsk (Russia)	3 – 0	(Armenia) Ararat Yerevan	Sochi
VLAT (UTC+10)		Summary

2 February 2015	Sakhalin Yuzhno-Sakhalinsk	2 – 0	Torpedo Moscow Youth	Sochi
VLAT (UTC+10)		Summary

19 February 2015	Sakhalin Yuzhno-Sakhalinsk (Russia)	1 – 0	(Armenia) Ulisses	Belek, Turkey
VLAT (UTC+10)	Tumasyan 20'	Summary

7 March 2015	Sakhalin Yuzhno-Sakhalinsk	0 – 1	Chelyabinsk	Sochi
17:00 VLAT (UTC+10)		Summary	70'

=== FNL Cup ===
Pos	Team	Pld	W	D	L	GF	GA	GD	Pts
1	Volgar Astrakhan	3	3	0	0	7	2	+5	9
2	SKA-Energiya	3	1	1	1	6	5	+1	4
3	Sakhalin Yuzhno-Sakhalinsk	3	0	2	1	2	3	−1	2
4	Gazovik Orenburg	3	0	1	2	1	6	−5	1

14 February 2015 1	Gazovik Orenburg	1 – 1	Sakhalin Yuzhno-Sakhalinsk	Belek, Turkey
00:00 VLAT (UTC+10)	Kobyalko 81'	Summary	Gagloyev 59'

16 February 2015 2	Sakhalin Yuzhno-Sakhalinsk	0 – 1	Volgar Astrakhan	Belek, Turkey
02:30 VLAT (UTC+10)		Summary	Gazzayev 3'

18 February 2015 3	SKA-Energiya	1 – 1	Sakhalin Yuzhno-Sakhalinsk	Belek, Turkey
02:30 VLAT (UTC+10)	Goal	Summary	Satalkin 53'

=== Final Series ===
21 February 2015 Playoff	Yenisey Krasnoyarsk	2 – 0	Sakhalin Yuzhno-Sakhalinsk	Belek, Turkey
00:15 VLAT (UTC+10)	Kochan 18'; Chadov 20'	Summary

22 February 2015 11th Place Playoff	Volgar Astrakhan	0 – 2	Sakhalin Yuzhno-Sakhalinsk	Belek, Turkey
23:15 VLAT (UTC+10)		Summary	Satalkin 1'; Kobzar 90'

== Competitions ==
=== Russian National Football League ===
==== Results by round ====
Round	1	2	3	4	5	6	7	8	9	10	11	12	13	14	15	16	17	18	19	20	21	22	23	24	25	26	27	28	29	30	31	32	33	34
Ground	A	H	A	H	A	H	A	H	A	A	A	H	A	H	A	H	A	A	H	A	H	A	H	A	H	H	H	A	H	A	H	A	H	H
Result	L	W	L	L	L	W	L	L	D	L	W	D	L	L	L	L	D	W	D	W	L	L	D	D	D	D	W	L	W	W	L	D	W	L
Position																					16	17	17	16	16	16	16	16	16	15	16	16	16	16

Updated to match(es) played on 26 May 2015. Source: FNL
A = Away; H = Home; W = Win; D = Draw; L = Loss

==== Matches ====
7 July 2014 1	Anzhi Makhachkala	1 – 0	Sakhalin Yuzhno-Sakhalinsk	Kaspiysk
02:00 VLAT (UTC+10)	Asildarov 33'; Gadzhibekov (yellow card) 36'	Summary		Stadium: Anzhi-Arena; Attendance: 6,820; Referee: Mikhail Vilkov

13 July 2014 2	Sakhalin Yuzhno-Sakhalinsk	1 – 0	SKA-Energiya Khabarovsk	Khimki
02:00 VLAT (UTC+10)	Vinogradov 19' (pen.); Parkhomenko (yellow card) 29'; Skepskyi (yellow card) 59'	Summary	Nikiforov (yellow card) 24'; Zamaliyev (yellow card) 26'; Karmazinenko (yellow card) 35'; Aladashvili (yellow card) 62'; Rukhaia (yellow card) 67' (red card) 84'	Stadium: Rodina Stadium; Attendance: 150; Referee: Igor Fedotov

20 July 2014 3	Baltika Kaliningrad	1 – 0	Sakhalin Yuzhno-Sakhalinsk	Kaliningrad
01:00 VLAT (UTC+10)	Tsukanov 61'	Summary		Stadium: Baltika Stadium; Attendance: 2,000; Referee: Sergey Lapochkin

27 July 2014 4	Sakhalin Yuzhno-Sakhalinsk	0 – 1	Khimik Dzerzhinsk	Yuzhno-Sakhalinsk
14:00 VLAT (UTC+10)	Gagloyev (yellow card) 63'	Summary	Shilov 9'	Stadium: Spartak Stadium; Attendance: 2,500; Referee: Roman Chernov

3 August 2014 5	FC Volga	3 – 0	Sakhalin Yuzhno-Sakhalinsk	Nizhny Novgorod
23:00 VLAT (UTC+10)	Kozlov 34' (yellow card) 56'; Kontsedalov 48'; Sukhanov 66'; Polczak (yellow card) 90'	Summary	Arziani (yellow card) 36'	Stadium: Lokomotiv Stadium; Attendance: 2,500; Referee: Aleksey Sukhoy

10 August 2014 6	Sakhalin Yuzhno-Sakhalinsk	1 – 0	Sokol Saratov	Yuzhno-Sakhalinsk
14:00 VLAT (UTC+10)	Kobzar 26'	Summary	Dutov (yellow card) 56'; Molodtsov (yellow card) 64' (yellow-red card) 90'; Stolyarenko (yellow card) 81'; Belousov (yellow card) 87'	Stadium: Spartak Stadium; Attendance: 1,200; Referee: Timur Arslanbekov

17 August 2014 7	Volgar Astrakhan	2 – 1	Sakhalin Yuzhno-Sakhalinsk	Astrakhan
01:00 VLAT (UTC+10)	Alkhazov 4' (pen.); Kolomiychenko (yellow card) 43'; Bolov 46'	Summary	Dzharkava (yellow card) 42'; Alakhverdov (yellow card) 45'; Ilyin 57'	Stadium: Central Stadium; Attendance: 2,560; Referee: Ivan Saraev

24 August 2014 8	Sakhalin Yuzhno-Sakhalinsk	0 – 4	Tom Tomsk	Yuzhno-Sakhalinsk
14:00 VLAT (UTC+10)	Mikheyev (yellow card) 25'	Summary	Bashkirov 23'; Golyshev 27', 68'; Mikhalyov 57'; Bendz (yellow card) 74'	Stadium: Spartak Stadium; Attendance: 2,000; Referee: Vladimir Moskalyov

7 September 2014 9	Gazovik Orenburg	0 – 0	Sakhalin Yuzhno-Sakhalinsk	Orenburg
21:00 VLAT (UTC+10)		Summary		Stadium: Gazovik Stadium; Attendance: 2,500; Referee: Sergey Kulikov

13 September 2014 10	Tosno	1 – 0	Sakhalin Yuzhno-Sakhalinsk	Tikhvin
22:00 VLAT (UTC+10)	Martsvaladze 24'	Summary	Khojava (yellow card) 72'	Stadium: Stadion Kirovets; Attendance: 1,500; Referee: Aleksei Matyunin

20 September 2014 11	Dynamo St.Petersburg	0 – 1	Sakhalin Yuzhno-Sakhalinsk	Saint Petersburg
22:00 VLAT (UTC+10)	Matrakhov (yellow card) 45'; Vorobyov (yellow card) 63'	Summary	Satalkin 69'; Mamayev (yellow card) 89'	Stadium: MSA Petrovsky; Attendance: 500; Referee: Denis Shpilev

29 September 2014 12	Sakhalin Yuzhno-Sakhalinsk	0 – 0	Tyumen	Yuzhno-Sakhalinsk
21:00 VLAT (UTC+10)	Mamayev (yellow card) 31'; Arziani (yellow card) 81'	Summary	Shlyapkin (yellow card) 31'; Cleyton (yellow card) 38'; Kuleshov (yellow card) 62'; Golyatkin (yellow card) 69'; Kanayev (yellow card) 90'	Stadium: Spartak Stadium; Attendance: 100; Referee: Lasha Verulidze

5 October 2014 13	Yenisey Krasnoyarsk	3 – 1	Sakhalin Yuzhno-Sakhalinsk	Krasnoyarsk
19:00 VLAT (UTC+10)	Gultyayev 27' (pen.) (yellow card) 65'; Gagloyev (yellow card) 44'; Leshonok 61'; Chadov 90+3'	Summary	Mamayev (yellow card) 37'; Satalkin 53' (yellow card) 78'; Dzharkava (yellow card) 57'; Arziani (yellow card) 59' (yellow-red card) 69'; Parkhomenko (yellow card) 79'	Stadium: Central Stadium; Attendance: 1,900; Referee: Igor Nizovtsev

11 October 2014 14	Sakhalin Yuzhno-Sakhalinsk	0 – 1	Sibir Novosibirsk	Yuzhno-Sakhalinsk
21:00 VLAT (UTC+10)	Gagloyev (yellow card) 45'; Mamayev (yellow card) 80'; Semyonov (yellow card) 82'	Summary	Gladyshev (yellow card) 50'; Svezhov (yellow card) 77'; Tsygan (yellow card) 90'; Skorokhodov (yellow card) 90'; Astafyev 90+1'	Stadium: Spartak Stadium; Attendance: 150; Referee: Kirill Levnikov

19 October 2014 15	Krylia Sovetov	5 – 3	Sakhalin Yuzhno-Sakhalinsk	Samara
22:00 VLAT (UTC+10)	Jahović 6', 37', 38'; Tkachuk 69', 79'	Summary	Gagloyev 11' (pen.); Alakhverdov (yellow card) 41'; Satalkin 62' (yellow card) 66'; Rudakov (yellow card) 78'; Arziani 90+2'	Stadium: Metallurg Stadium; Attendance: 3,831; Referee: Aleksey Eskov

25 October 2014 16	Sakhalin Yuzhno-Sakhalinsk	0 – 1	Shinnik Yaroslavl	Yuzhno-Sakhalinsk
20:00 VLAT (UTC+10)	Khojava (yellow card) 7'; Mikhalyov (yellow card) 16'; Arziani (yellow card) 42'	Summary	Voydel (yellow card) 11'; Gorbatenko 17' (pen.); Malyshev (yellow card) 90'	Stadium: Spartak Stadium; Referee: Vitaly Rushakov

2 November 2014 17	Luch-Energiya	1 – 1	Sakhalin Yuzhno-Sakhalinsk	Vladivostok
16:00 VLAT (UTC+10)	Koryan 43'	Summary	Mischenko (yellow card) 17'; Khojava (yellow card) 29'; Satalkin 35'	Stadium: Dynamo Stadium; Attendance: 850; Referee: Nikolay Voloshin

8 November 2014 18	SKA-Energiya	0 – 1	Sakhalin Yuzhno-Sakhalinsk	Khabarovsk
14:00 VLAT (UTC+10)	Udaly (yellow card) 72'	Summary	Gogichayev (yellow card) 23'; Mamayev (yellow card) 56'; Khojava (yellow card) 61'; Ilyin 71'	Stadium: Lenin Stadium; Attendance: 2,000; Referee: Timur Arslanbekov

14 November 2014 19	Sakhalin Yuzhno-Sakhalinsk	0 – 0	Baltika Kaliningrad	Yuzhno-Sakhalinsk
21:00 VLAT (UTC+10)	Arziani (yellow card) 7'; Ilyin (yellow card) 71'	Summary	Zaprudskikh (yellow card) 27'; Gatsko (yellow card) 51'; Alekseyev (yellow card) 58'; Kalenkovich (yellow card) 87'	Stadium: Spartak Stadium; Attendance: 150; Referee: Sergey Karasev

19 November 2014 20	Khimik Dzerzhinsk	1 – 2	Sakhalin Yuzhno-Sakhalinsk	Dzerzhinsk
01:00 VLAT (UTC+10)	S.Fedotov (yellow card) 44' (yellow-red card) 72'; Stolbovoy 51'; Kasyan (yellow card) 84'	Summary	Gagloyev 18'; Semyonov (yellow card) 33'; Satalkin 78'	Stadium: Khimik Stadium; Attendance: 450; Referee: Stanislav Vasilyev

22 November 2014 21	Sakhalin Yuzhno-Sakhalinsk	2 – 3	FC Volga	Yuzhno-Sakhalinsk
20:00 VLAT (UTC+10)	Satalkin 21', 47'; Korbut (yellow card) 57'	Summary	Malyaka (yellow card) 30'; Minosyan 49'; Sukhanov (yellow card) 63'; Sarkisov 78'; Kozlov 89'	Stadium: Spartak Stadium; Attendance: 200; Referee: Artem Chistyakov

15 March 2015 22	Sokol Saratov	1 – 0	Sakhalin Yuzhno-Sakhalinsk	Saratov
00:00 VLAT (UTC+10)	Gabovs (yellow card) 40'; Mullin 90+4'	Summary	Josan (yellow card) 30'	Stadium: Lokomotiv Stadium; Attendance: 6,200; Referee: Vladimir Seldyakov

18 March 2015 23	Sakhalin Yuzhno-Sakhalinsk	2 – 2	Volgar Astrakhan	Khimki
22:00 VLAT (UTC+10)	Satalkin 38'; Gagloyev 39' (yellow card) 83'	Summary	Verkashanskiy 7'; Krendelev 21'; Petrović (yellow card) 72'	Stadium: Rodina Stadium; Attendance: 300; Referee: Mikhail Belov

22 March 2015 24	Tom Tomsk	2 – 2	Sakhalin Yuzhno-Sakhalinsk	Tomsk
20:00 VLAT (UTC+10)	Nyakhaychyk 44'; Nemov 51'; Dimidko (yellow card) 67'	Summary	Satalkin 50'; Gagloyev 68' (pen.); Kondratyuk (yellow card) 90'	Stadium: Trud Stadium; Attendance: 2,900; Referee: Vitaly Rushakov

29 March 2015 25	Sakhalin Yuzhno-Sakhalinsk	0 – 0	Gazovik Orenburg	Yuzhno-Sakhalinsk
15:00 VLAT (UTC+10)	Gagloyev (yellow card) 22'; Voronkin (yellow card) 90'	Summary	Vasiev (yellow card) 31'; Poluyakhtov (yellow card) 45'; Kabutov (yellow card) 60'; Yakovlev (yellow card) 85'	Stadium: Spartak Stadium; Attendance: 700; Referee: Igor Fedotov

5 April 2015 26	Sakhalin Yuzhno-Sakhalinsk	0 – 0	Tosno	Yuzhno-Sakhalinsk
16:00 VLAT (UTC+10)	Khojava (yellow card) 89'	Summary	Astafyev (yellow card) 89'	Stadium: Spartak Stadium; Attendance: 1,100; Referee: Aleksei Matyunin

12 April 2015 27	Sakhalin Yuzhno-Sakhalinsk	2 – 0	Dynamo St. Petersburg	Yuzhno-Sakhalinsk
16:00 VLAT (UTC+10)	Gagloyev 61' (pen.); Korbut (yellow card) 81'; Bulyga 88' (pen.)	Summary	Zolotarenko (yellow card) 90'	Stadium: Spartak Stadium; Attendance: 1,500; Referee: Yury Aponasenko

20 April 2015 28	Tyumen	5 – 1	Sakhalin Yuzhno-Sakhalinsk	Tyumen
00:00 VLAT (UTC+10)	Telenkov (yellow card) 1'; Nezhelev 43'; Ponomaryov (yellow card) 49' (goal) 64'; Mamtov 63', 90+2', 90+5'	Summary	Mikhalyov 84'	Stadium: Geolog Stadium; Attendance: 1,100; Referee: Evgeny Turbin

25 April 2015 29	Sakhalin Yuzhno-Sakhalinsk	1 – 0	Yenisey Krasnoyarsk	Yuzhno-Sakhalinsk
17:00 VLAT (UTC+10)	Mikhalyov 72'; Khojava (yellow card) 72'; Frolov (yellow card) 84'	Summary		Stadium: Spartak Stadium; Attendance: 1,000; Referee: Stanislav Vasilyev

3 May 2015 30	Sibir Novosibirsk	1 – 3	Sakhalin Yuzhno-Sakhalinsk	Novosibirsk
19:00 VLAT (UTC+10)	Rogochiy (yellow card) 45'; Belyayev 85'	Summary	Bulyga 29'; Vinogradov (yellow card) 54'; Kobzar 70', 90'	Stadium: Spartak Stadium; Attendance: 1,100; Referee: Artem Chistyakov

10 May 2015 30	Sakhalin Yuzhno-Sakhalinsk	0 – 3	Krylia Sovetov	Yuzhno-Sakhalinsk
15:00 VLAT (UTC+10)		Summary	Tkachuk 31' (yellow card) 65'; Burlak 60'; Simaeys 79'; Pomerko (yellow card) 88'	Stadium: Spartak Stadium; Attendance: 2,300; Referee: Roman Chernov

16 May 2015 32	Shinnik Yaroslavl	1 – 1	Sakhalin Yuzhno-Sakhalinsk	Yaroslavl
23:00 VLAT (UTC+10)	Nizamutdinov 8'; Timoshin (yellow card) 56'; Yatchenko (yellow card) 68'	Summary	Mikhalyov 15'; Korbut (yellow card) 29'; Mamayev (yellow card) 50'; Frolov (yellow card) 58'	Stadium: Shinnik Stadium; Attendance: 1,500; Referee: Nikolay Voloshin

23 May 2015 33	Sakhalin Yuzhno-Sakhalinsk	2 – 1	Luch-Energiya	Yuzhno-Sakhalinsk
15:00 VLAT (UTC+10)	Khojava (yellow card) 18'; Mamayev 38'; Khinchagov 41'; Kuleshov (yellow card) 90'	Summary	Semochko (yellow card) 39'; Myazin 90+3'	Stadium: Spartak Stadium; Attendance: 1,800; Referee: Anton Anopa

30 May 2015 34	Sakhalin Yuzhno-Sakhalinsk	0 – 3	Anzhi Makhachkala	Yuzhno-Sakhalinsk
20:00 VLAT (UTC+10)	Mamayev (yellow card) 37'; Satalkin (yellow card) 75'; Mikhalyov (yellow card) 80'	Summary	Dibirgadzhiev 7'; Abdulavov 47'; Krivoruchko (yellow card) 73'; Udunyan 81'	Stadium: Spartak Stadium; Attendance: 2,500; Referee: Evgeny Turbin

==== League table ====
Pos	Team	Pld	W	D	L	GF	GA	GD	Pts	Promotion or relegation
14	SKA-Khabarovsk	34	8	13	13	32	46	−14	37 (Note: Head-to-head record: SKA – Baltika 2–1, Baltika – SKA 1–1.)	
15	Baltika Kaliningrad	34	8	13	13	25	37	−12	37	
16	Sakhalin Yuzhno-Sakhalinsk (R)	34	9	8	17	28	50	−22	35	Relegation to Professional Football League
17	Khimik Dzerzhinsk (R)	34	7	6	21	35	59	−24	27	Relegation to Professional Football League
18	Dynamo St. Petersburg (R)	34	2	7	25	18	63	−45	13	Relegation to Professional Football League

Source: FNL, Soccerway
Rules for classification: 1st points; 2nd matches won; 3rd head-to-head (points, matches won, goal difference, goals scored, away goals scored); 4th goal difference; 5th goals scored; 6th away goals scored
(R) Relegated

=== Russian Cup ===
30 August 2014 Fourth Round	Sakhalin Yuzhno-Sakhalinsk	0 – 1	Luch-Energiya	Yuzhno-Sakhalinsk
15:00 VLAT (UTC+10)	Mikheyev (yellow card) 60'	Summary	Grachyov (yellow card) 8'; Prokofyev 66'	Stadium: Spartak Stadium; Attendance: 1,200; Referee: Oleg Sokolov

== Squad statistics ==
As of match played 30 May 2015

=== Appearances and goals ===
No.	Pos	Nat	Player	Total		Football League		Russian Cup	
No.	Pos	Nat	Player	Apps	Goals	Apps	Goals	Apps	Goals
3	DF	(Russia) RUS	Murtazi Alakhverdov	34	0	34	0	0	0
5	DF	(Russia) RUS	Mikhail Mischenko	24	0	19+4	0	1	0
7	MF	(Russia) RUS	Aleksandr Gagloyev	31	5	24+6	5	0+1	0
9	MF	(Russia) RUS	Vladimir Mikhalyov	18	3	4+14	3	0	0
11	MF	(Russia) RUS	Sergei Vinogradov	35	1	24+10	1	1	0
12	GK	(Russia) RUS	Andrei Kondratyuk	4	0	2+1	0	1	0
13	MF	(Russia) RUS	Nikita Drozdov	24	0	10+14	0	0	0
15	FW	(Russia) RUS	Georgy Gogichayev	18	0	10+7	0	0+1	0
17	MF	(Russia) RUS	Eldar Mamayev	34	1	33	1	1	0
19	GK	(Russia) RUS	Yevgeni Frolov	25	0	25	0	0	0
20	MF	(Russia) RUS	Vadim Khinchagov	10	1	8+2	1	0	0
21	DF	(Russia) RUS	Aleksei Korbut	18	0	14+3	0	1	0
22	FW	(Russia) RUS	Nikita Satalkin	19	9	18+1	9	0	0
24	MF	(Russia) RUS	Yevgeni Dudikov	6	0	1+5	0	0	0
27	MF	(Georgia (country)) GEO	Giorgi Kakhelishvili	10	0	6+4	0	0	0
28	DF	(Russia) RUS	Andrei Semyonov	20	0	16+4	0	0	0
29	MF	(Russia) RUS	Aleksandr Ilyin	14	2	4+9	2	0+1	0
30	MF	(Georgia (country)) GEO	Gocha Khojava	18	0	17+1	0	0	0
35	FW	(Belarus) BLR	Vital Bulyga	13	2	13	2	0	0
40	MF	(Russia) RUS	Yuri Kuleshov	13	0	12+1	0	0	0
44	DF	(Russia) RUS	Nikita Chicherin	1	0	1	0	0	0
50	MF	(Russia) RUS	Artyom Voronkin	4	0	3+1	0	0	0
57	DF	(Russia) RUS	Artyom Kazakov	2	0	0+2	0	0	0
60	MF	(Moldova) MDA	Nicolae Josan	12	0	12	0	0	0
99	FW	(Russia) RUS	Yevgeni Kobzar	29	3	10+18	3	1	0
Players away from the club on loan:
Players who appeared for Sakhalin Yuzhno-Sakhalinsk that left during the season:
1	GK	(Russia) RUS	Aleksandr Samokhvalov	7	0	7	0	0	0
8	MF	(Russia) RUS	Artyom Bludnov	5	0	0+4	0	1	0
10	MF	(Ukraine) UKR	Denys Skepskyi	8	0	2+5	0	1	0
23	DF	(Russia) RUS	Levan Dzharkava	13	0	12+1	0	0	0
33	MF	(Ukraine) UKR	Kostyantyn Parkhomenko	18	0	13+4	0	1	0
55	MF	(Georgia (country)) GEO	Zurab Arziani	18	1	18	1	0	0
78	MF	(Russia) RUS	Andrei Mikheyev	6	0	1+4	0	1	0
89	DF	(Russia) RUS	Anton Rudakov	3	0	1+1	0	1	0

=== Goal Scorers ===
Place	Position	Nation	Number	Name	Russian Football League	Russian Cup	Total
1	FW	(Russia)	22	Nikita Satalkin	9	0	9
2	MF	(Russia)	7	Aleksandr Gagloyev	5	0	5
3	FW	(Russia)	99	Yevgeni Kobzar	3	0	3
3	MF	(Russia)	9	Vladimir Mikhalyov	3	0	3
5	MF	(Russia)	29	Aleksandr Ilyin	2	0	2
5	FW	(Belarus)	35	Vital Bulyga	2	0	2
7	FW	(Russia)	11	Sergei Vinogradov	1	0	1
7	MF	(Georgia (country))	55	Zurab Arziani	1	0	1
7	MF	(Russia)	17	Eldar Mamayev	1	0	1
7	MF	(Russia)	20	Vadim Khinchagov	1	0	1
				TOTALS	28	0	28

=== Disciplinary record ===
Number	Nation	Position	Name	Russian Football League		Russian Cup		Total	
Number	Nation	Position	Name	Yellow card	Red card	Yellow card	Red card	Yellow card	Red card
3	(Russia)	DF	Murtazi Alakhverdov	2	0	0	0	2	0
5	(Russia)	DF	Mikhail Mischenko	1	0	0	0	1	0
7	(Russia)	MF	Aleksandr Gagloyev	4	0	0	0	4	0
9	(Russia)	MF	Vladimir Mikhalyov	2	0	0	0	2	0
10	(Ukraine)	MF	Denys Skepskyi	1	0	0	0	1	0
11	(Russia)	MF	Sergei Vinogradov	1	0	0	0	1	0
12	(Russia)	GK	Andrei Kondratyuk	1	0	0	0	1	0
15	(Russia)	FW	Georgy Gogichayev	1	0	0	0	1	0
17	(Russia)	MF	Eldar Mamayev	7	0	0	0	7	0
19	(Russia)	GK	Yevgeni Frolov	2	0	0	0	2	0
21	(Russia)	DF	Aleksei Korbut	3	0	0	0	3	0
22	(Russia)	FW	Nikita Satalkin	2	0	0	0	2	0
23	(Russia)	DF	Levan Dzharkava	2	0	0	0	2	0
28	(Russia)	DF	Andrei Semyonov	2	0	0	0	2	0
29	(Russia)	MF	Aleksandr Ilyin	1	0	0	0	1	0
30	(Georgia (country))	MF	Gocha Khojava	7	0	0	0	7	0
33	(Ukraine)	MF	Kostyantyn Parkhomenko	2	0	0	0	2	0
40	(Russia)	MF	Yuri Kuleshov	1	0	0	0	1	0
50	(Russia)	MF	Artyom Voronkin	1	0	0	0	1	0
55	(Georgia (country))	MF	Zurab Arziani	6	1	0	0	6	1
60	(Moldova)	MF	Nicolae Josan	1	0	0	0	1	0
78	(Russia)	MF	Andrei Mikheyev	1	0	1	0	2	0
89	(Russia)	DF	Anton Rudakov	1	0	0	0	1	0
			TOTALS	52	1	1	0	53	1
