= Fyodor Pervushin =

Russian footballer

Personal information
- Full name: Fyodor Mikhaylovich Pervushin
- Date of birth: 21 January 1994 (age 32)
- Place of birth: Barnaul, Russia
- Height: 1.80 m (5 ft 11 in)
- Position: Defender

Senior career*
Years	Team	Apps	(Gls)
2011–2013	FC Dynamo Barnaul	33	(5)
2013–2014	FC Sakhalin Yuzhno-Sakhalinsk	20	(0)
2014–2015	FC Dynamo Barnaul	24	(6)
2015–2016	FC Sakhalin Yuzhno-Sakhalinsk	17	(0)
2017	FC Dynamo Barnaul	9	(1)
2017–2018	FC Sakhalin Yuzhno-Sakhalinsk	20	(1)
2018–2020	FC Shinnik Yaroslavl	51	(0)
2020	FC Fakel Voronezh	9	(0)
2020–2021	FC Neftekhimik Nizhnekamsk	20	(1)
2021–2022	FC Rotor Volgograd	20	(0)
2022–2023	FC Dynamo Vladivostok	23	(0)
2023	PFC Dynamo Stavropol	11	(0)
- * Club domestic league appearances and goals

Fyodor Mikhaylovich Pervushin (Russian: Федор Михайлович Первушин; born 21 January 1994) is a Russian former football player.

== Club career ==
He made his debut in the Russian Second Division for FC Dynamo Barnaul on 2 May 2012 in a game against FC Amur-2010 Blagoveshchensk.

He made his Russian Football National League debut for FC Shinnik Yaroslavl on 17 July 2018 in a game against FC Avangard Kursk.
