= Chadov =

Chadov (masculine, Russian: Чадов) or Chadova (feminine, Russian: Чадова) is a Russian surname. Notable people with the surname include:

- Andrei Chadov (born 1980), Russian actor
- Aleksey Chadov (born 1981), Russian actor
- Vyacheslav Chadov (born 1986), Russian footballer
