= Andrei Semyonov (footballer, born 1992) =

Russian footballer

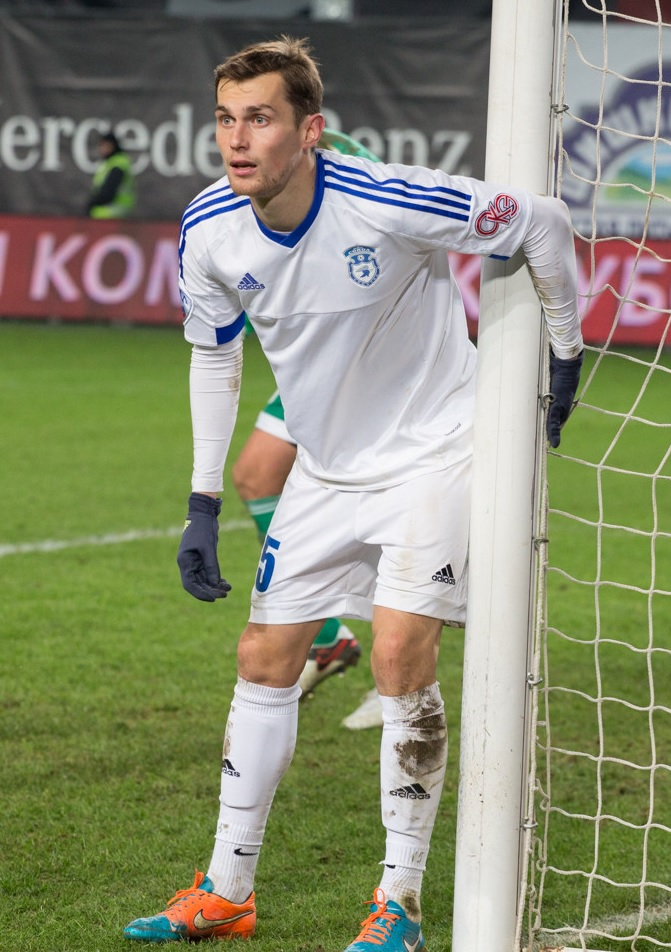
- Semyonov with Sokol Saratov in 2016

Personal information
- Full name: Andrei Igorevich Semyonov
- Date of birth: 8 June 1992 (age 34)
- Place of birth: Nelidovo, Russia
- Height: 1.84 m (6 ft 0 in)
- Position: Right-back

Team information
- Current team: Dynamo Vladivostok
- Number: 28

Youth career
- 2010–2011: Lokomotiv Moscow
- 2011–2012: CSKA Moscow

Senior career*
| Years | Team | Apps | (Gls) |
| 2012–2014 | Lokomotiv-2 Moscow | 32 | (0) |
| 2014–2015 | Sakhalin Yuzhno-Sakhalinsk | 20 | (0) |
| 2015–2016 | Luch-Energiya Vladivostok | 14 | (0) |
| 2016–2017 | Sokol Saratov | 26 | (2) |
| 2017–2018 | Fakel Voronezh | 32 | (2) |
| 2018 | Syzran-2003 | 14 | (3) |
| 2019–2021 | Neftekhimik Nizhnekamsk | 65 | (3) |
| 2021–2024 | Shinnik Yaroslavl | 88 | (7) |
| 2024–2026 | Rotor Volgograd | 43 | (3) |
| 2026 | KAMAZ Naberezhnye Chelny | 7 | (0) |
| 2026– | Dynamo Vladivostok | 6 | (1) |

International career^{‡}
| 2010 | Russia U-18 | 1 | (0) |
| 2013–2014 | Russia U-21 | 11 | (0) |
- * Club domestic league appearances and goals as of 15 November 2026 ‡ National team caps and goals as of 9 September 2014

Andrei Igorevich Semyonov (Russian: Андрей Игоревич Семёнов; born 8 June 1992) is a Russian football defender who plays for Dynamo Vladivostok.

== Club career ==
He made his debut in the Russian Second Division for Lokomotiv-2 Moscow on 23 July 2012 in a game against Znamya Truda Orekhovo-Zuyevo.

He made his Russian Football National League debut for Sakhalin Yuzhno-Sakhalinsk on 6 July 2014 in a game against Anzhi Makhachkala.

== Career statistics ==
As of 16 May 2026

| Club | Season | League | | | Cup | | Other | | Total | |
| Club | Season | Division | Apps | Goals | Apps | Goals | Apps | Goals | Apps | Goals |
|---|---|---|---|---|---|---|---|---|---|---|
| Lokomotiv-2 Moscow | 2012–13 | Russian Second League | 14 | 0 | 3 | 0 | — | | 17 | 0 |
| Lokomotiv-2 Moscow | 2013–14 | Russian Second League | 18 | 0 | 0 | 0 | — | | 18 | 0 |
| Lokomotiv-2 Moscow | Total | | 32 | 0 | 3 | 0 | 0 | 0 | 35 | 0 |
| Sakhalin | 2014–15 | Russian First League | 20 | 0 | 0 | 0 | 3 (Note: Appearances in FNL Cup) | 0 | 23 | 0 |
| Luch-Energiya Vladivostok | 2015–16 | Russian First League | 14 | 0 | 1 | 0 | — | | 15 | 0 |
| Sokol Saratov | 2016–17 | Russian First League | 26 | 2 | 1 | 0 | — | | 27 | 2 |
| Fakel Voronezh | 2017–18 | Russian First League | 32 | 2 | 1 | 0 | 5 | 0 | 38 | 2 |
| Syzran-2003 | 2018–19 | Russian Second League | 14 | 3 | 3 | 1 | — | | 17 | 4 |
| Neftekhimik Nizhnekamsk | 2018–19 | Russian Second League | 8 | 2 | — | | — | | 8 | 2 |
| Neftekhimik Nizhnekamsk | 2019–20 | Russian First League | 26 | 0 | 1 | 0 | — | | 27 | 0 |
| Neftekhimik Nizhnekamsk | 2020–21 | Russian First League | 31 | 1 | 1 | 0 | — | | 32 | 1 |
| Neftekhimik Nizhnekamsk | Total | | 65 | 3 | 2 | 0 | 0 | 0 | 67 | 3 |
| Shinnik Yaroslavl | 2021–22 | Russian Second League | 30 | 5 | 0 | 0 | — | | 30 | 5 |
| Shinnik Yaroslavl | 2022–23 | Russian First League | 33 | 2 | 1 | 0 | — | | 34 | 2 |
| Shinnik Yaroslavl | 2023–24 | Russian First League | 25 | 0 | 2 | 0 | — | | 27 | 0 |
| Shinnik Yaroslavl | Total | | 88 | 7 | 3 | 0 | 0 | 0 | 91 | 7 |
| Rotor Volgograd | 2024–25 | Russian First League | 33 | 2 | 1 | 0 | — | | 34 | 2 |
| Rotor Volgograd | 2025–26 | Russian First League | 10 | 1 | 1 | 0 | — | | 11 | 1 |
| Rotor Volgograd | Total | | 43 | 3 | 2 | 0 | 0 | 0 | 45 | 3 |
| KAMAZ | 2025–26 | Russian First League | 7 | 0 | — | | — | | 7 | 0 |
| Career total | | | 341 | 20 | 16 | 1 | 8 | 0 | 365 | 21 |
