= Andrei Klimenko =

Russian footballer

Personal information
- Full name: Andrei Sergeyevich Klimenko
- Date of birth: 4 September 1978 (age 48)
- Place of birth: Yuzhno-Sakhalinsk, Russian SFSR
- Height: 1.74 m (5 ft 8 1/2 in)
- Positions: Midfielder; defender

Senior career*
Years	Team	Apps	(Gls)
2000–2001	FC Amur-Energiya Blagoveshchensk	45	(3)
2002–2004	FC Dynamo Barnaul	79	(27)
2005–2008	FC Ural Yekaterinburg	88	(0)
2008–2013	FC Metallurg-Kuzbass Novokuznetsk	108	(6)
2013–2014	FC Sakhalin Yuzhno-Sakhalinsk	21	(1)
2014–2015	FC Dynamo Barnaul	21	(0)
- * Club domestic league appearances and goals

Andrei Sergeyevich Klimenko (Russian: Андрей Серге́евич Клименко; born 4 September 1978) is a former Russian professional football player.

== Club career ==
He played 5 seasons in the Russian Football National League for FC Ural Yekaterinburg and FC Metallurg-Kuzbass Novokuznetsk.

== Honours ==
- Russian Second Division Zone East best midfielder: 2004.
