= Khinchagov =

Khinchagov (Russian: Хинчагов) is an Ossetian masculine surname; its feminine counterpart is Khinchagova (Russian: Хинчагова). It may refer to:

- Deviko Khinchagov (born 1987), Russian football player
- Khetag Khinchagov (born 1997), Russian para-athlete
- Ruslan Khinchagov (born 1970), Uzbekistani wrestler
- Vadim Khinchagov (born 1981), Russian football midfielder
