= Samokhvalov =

Samokhvalov (Russian: Самохвалов) is a Russian masculine surname, its feminine counterpart is Samokhvalova. It may refer to

- Aleksandr Samokhvalov (disambiguation)
- Andrei Samokhvalov (born 1975), Kazakhstani ice hockey player
- Innokenti Samokhvalov (1997-2020), Russian football player
- Maria Kleschar-Samokhvalova (1915–2000), Russian painter and graphic artist
- Svetlana Samokhvalova (born 1972), Russian cyclist
