= Korshunov =

Korshunov (Russian: Коршунов, from коршун meaning kite (bird) is a Russian masculine surname, its feminine counterpart is Korshunova. It may refer to

- Alexander Korshunov (born 1968), Transnistrian politician
- Andrei Korshunov (born 1965), Russian equestrian
- Ekaterina Korshunova (born 1988), Russian shooter
- Inga Korshunova, Russian pair skater
- Maksim Korshunov (born 1977), Russian swimmer
- Maksim Korshunov (footballer) (born 1993), Russian football midfielder
- Nikolay Korshunov (born 1978), Russian musician and journalist
- Ruslana Korshunova (1987–2008), Kazakhstani model of Russian descent
- Sergei Korshunov (1928–1982), Soviet football player
- Tatiana Korshunova (born 1956), Soviet sprint canoer
- Viktor Korshunov (1929–2015), Russian actor
- Vladislav Korshunov (born 1983), Russian rugby union player
- Yuri Korshunov (1933–2002), Russian entomologist

== See also ==
- Egor Korshunov, a character in the 1997 movie Air Force One
- Korsunov
