= Korbut =

Korbut may refer to:

- Aleksei Korbut (born 1981), Russian football player
- Ekaterina Korbut (born 1985), Russian chess player, a Woman Grandmaster
- Mikalay Korbut (1948–2026), Belarusian politician
- Olga Korbut (born 1955), Belarusian, Soviet-born gymnast
- Korbut Flip, two gymnastics skills named after Olga Korbut
