= Andriy Parkhomenko =

Ukrainian footballer and manager

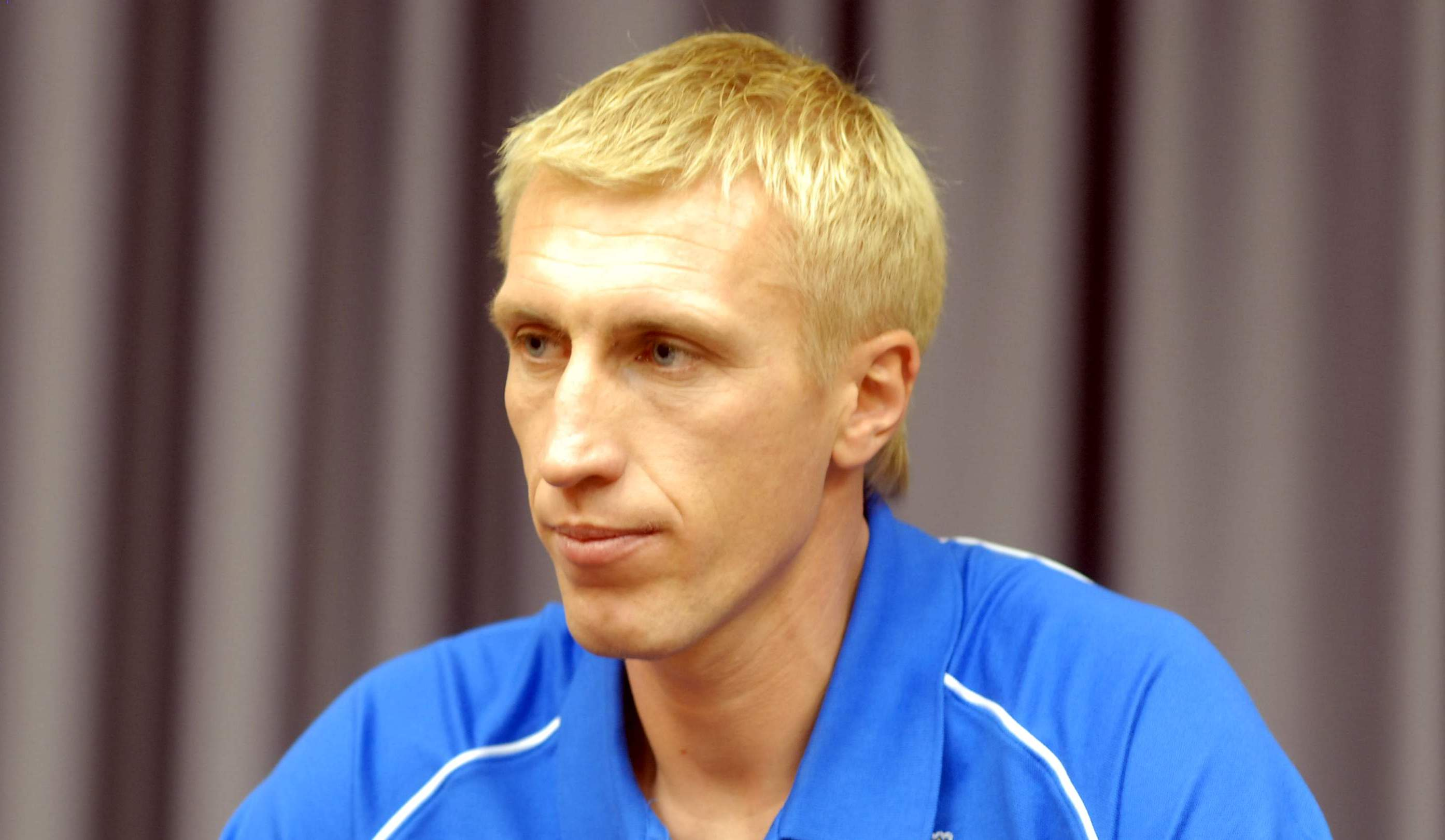

Personal information
- Full name: Andriy Viktorovych Parkhomenko
- Date of birth: 27 December 1971 (age 54)
- Place of birth: Odesa, Ukrainian SSR
- Height: 1.83 m (6 ft 0 in)
- Positions: Defender; midfielder; forward

Team information
- Current team: Chornomorets Odesa (assistant manager)

Youth career
- Chornomorets Odesa
- Kolos Nikopol

Senior career*
Years	Team	Apps	(Gls)
1988	Kolos Nikopol	2	(0)
1989–1990	Chornomorets Odesa	0	(0)
1991	SKA Odesa	24	(0)
1992	Neftchi Baku		
1992	Terek Grozny	19	(0)
1992–1993	Tavriya Simferopol	3	(0)
1993–1994	Odesa	33	(4)
1994–1995	Podillya Khmelnytskyi	20	(1)
1995–1996	Nyva Ternopil	42	(1)
1996–1998	SKA-Lotto Odesa	26	(2)
1998	Chornomorets Odesa	19	(0)
1999–2000	Botev Vratsa		
2000	Sheriff Tiraspol	10	(0)
2001	Tiligul Tiraspol	4	(0)
2001	Tiraspol	5	(0)
2002	Agro Chişinău	9	(1)
2002	Signal Odesa		
2002	IRIK Odesa		
2003	Ivan Odesa		
2003	Zakarpattia Uzhhorod	1	(0)
2004	Palmira Odesa	22	(0)
2005	Digital Odesa		
2005–2008	Sakhalin Yuzhno-Sakhalinsk	44	(0)

Managerial career
- 2003: Ivan Odesa
- 2007: Sakhalin Yuzhno-Sakhalinsk
- 2008: Sakhalin Yuzhno-Sakhalinsk
- 2008–2011: Dnister Ovidiopol
- 2011: Dnister Ovidiopol (assistant)
- 2011–2013: Odesa
- 2013–2014: Odesa (academy)
- 2014: Sakhalin Yuzhno-Sakhalinsk
- 2014–2015: Sakhalin Yuzhno-Sakhalinsk (assistant)
- 2015: Sakhalin Yuzhno-Sakhalinsk (caretaker)
- 2015: Sakhalin Yuzhno-Sakhalinsk (assistant)
- 2015–2020: Balkany Zorya
- 2022–2024: Real Pharma Odesa
- 2025: Sheriff Tiraspol (assistant)
- 2026–: Chornomorets Odesa (assistant)
- * Club domestic league appearances and goals as of 18 March 2026

Andriy Viktorovych Parkhomenko (Ukrainian: Андрій Вікторович Пархоменко; born 27 December 1971) is a Ukrainian football coach and a former player. He has a son Kostyantyn Parkhomenko and a brother Dmytro Parkhomenko who played for FC Balkany Zorya.

== Coaching career ==
In the period 2022–2024 Parkhomenko was the head coach of Real Pharma Odesa. Since September 2024, he has been working as a coach at the football academy in Toronto. From 1 Juni until 2 September 2025, he worked as an assistant manager at Sheriff Tiraspol. On 16 February 2026, Parkhomenko has been signed as assistant manager by Chornomorets Odesa.
