= Bogatyryov =

Bogatyryov (masculine, Russian: Богатырёв) or Bogatyryova (feminine, Russian: Богатырёва) is a Russian surname. Notable people with the surname include:

- Abumuslim Bogatyryov (born 1984), Russian footballer
- Anatoly Bogatyrev (1913–2003), Belarusian composer and music teacher
- Timur Bogatyryov (born 1965), Russian footballer and manager
- Yuri Bogatyryov (1947–1989), Soviet actor
