= Artyom Kazakov =

Russian footballer

Personal information
- Full name: Artyom Pavlovich Kazakov
- Date of birth: 26 May 1990 (age 36)
- Height: 1.94 m (6 ft 4 1/2 in)
- Position: Defender

Senior career*
Years	Team	Apps	(Gls)
2007	FC Azovets Primorsko-Akhtarsk		
2008	FC Kuban-D Krasnodar		
2009–2010	FC Krasnodar-2000	45	(2)
2011–2012	FC Druzhba Maykop	50	(7)
2013	FC Lokomotiv-2 Moscow	3	(0)
2013–2014	FC Dnepr Smolensk	47	(2)
2015	FC Sakhalin Yuzhno-Sakhalinsk	2	(0)
- * Club domestic league appearances and goals

Artyom Pavlovich Kazakov (Russian: Артём Павлович Казаков; born 26 May 1990) is a former Russian professional football player.

== Career ==
In March 2015, Kazakov signed for FC Sakhalin Yuzhno-Sakhalinsk. He made his Russian Football National League debut for Sakhalin on 22 March 2015 in a game against FC Tom Tomsk. That was his only season in the FNL.
