= Kostyantyn Parkhomenko =

Ukrainian footballer

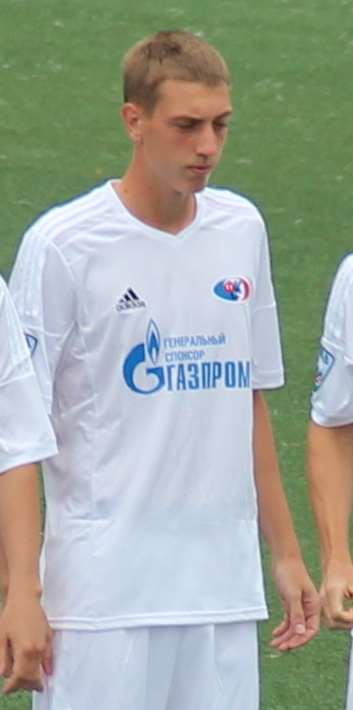

Personal information
- Full name: Kostyantyn Andriyovych Parkhomenko
- Date of birth: 25 May 1991 (age 35)
- Place of birth: Odesa, Ukrainian SSR
- Height: 1.92 m (6 ft 3 1/2 in)
- Position: Midfielder

Team information
- Current team: FC Balkany Zorya
- Number: 27

Senior career*
Years	Team	Apps	(Gls)
2007–2009	FC Sakhalin Yuzhno-Sakhalinsk	51	(0)
2009–2010	FC Dynamo-2 Kyiv	0	(0)
2010	→ FC Dnister Ovidiopol (loan)	18	(1)
2010–2011	FC Dnister Ovidiopol	20	(1)
2011	FC Oleksandriya	11	(0)
2011–2013	FC Odesa	64	(3)
2013	FC Helios Kharkiv	6	(0)
2014	FC Stal Dniprodzerzhynsk	4	(0)
2014–2015	FC Sakhalin Yuzhno-Sakhalinsk	17	(0)
2015–	FC Balkany Zorya		
- * Club domestic league appearances and goals

Kostyantyn Andriyovych Parkhomenko (Ukrainian: Костянтин Андрійович Пархоменко; Russian: Константин Андреевич Пархоменко; born May 25, 1991) is a Ukrainian football player who last played for FC Sakhalin Yuzhno-Sakhalinsk. He also holds Russian citizenship.

== Career ==
He made his Russian National Football League debut for FC Sakhalin Yuzhno-Sakhalinsk on July 6, 2014, in a game against FC Anzhi Makhachkala.

He is a son of Andriy Parkhomenko and nephew of Dmytro Parkhomenko, both footballers.
