= Abumuslim Bogatyryov =

Russian professional football player

Personal information
- Full name: Abumuslim Magomedovich Bogatyryov
- Date of birth: 28 August 1984 (age 42)
- Place of birth: Kaspiysk, Russian SFSR
- Height: 1.73 m (5 ft 8 in)
- Position: Midfielder

Youth career
- FC Dynamo Makhachkala
- FC Salyut Belgorod

Senior career*
Years	Team	Apps	(Gls)
2002–2005	FC Dagestanets Makhachkala		
2006	FC Spartak Gelendzhik		
2007	FC Dynamo Makhachkala		
2007	FC Zhemchuzhina-A Sochi		
2007	FC Kaisar	9	(0)
2007–2008	FC Spartak Gelendzhik		
2009	Olmaliq FK	9	(2)
2009	FC Kaisar	10	(1)
2010	FC Lokomotiv Liski	28	(2)
2011–2012	FC Radian-Baikal Irkutsk	35	(4)
2012–2013	FC Amur-2010 Blagoveshchensk	23	(3)
2013–2014	FC Sakhalin Yuzhno-Sakhalinsk	24	(1)
2014–2016	FC Lokomotiv Liski	52	(2)
2016–2017	FC Avangard Kursk	22	(1)
2017	FC SKA Rostov-on-Don	17	(1)
2018–2020	FC Legion-Dynamo Makhachkala	56	(7)
- * Club domestic league appearances and goals

Abumuslim Magomedovich Bogatyryov (Russian: Абумуслим Магомедович Богатырёв; born 28 August 1984) is a Russian former professional football player.

== Club career ==
Bogatyryov played in the Kazakhstan Premier League with FC Kaisar.
