= Korsunov =

Korsunov (Russian: Корсунов) is a Russian masculine surname, its feminine counterpart is Korsunova (Корсунова). It may refer to:

- Mihail Korsunov (born 1963), Russian-born Estonian ice hockey player
- Veronika Korsunova (born 1992), Russian freestyle skier
- Vladimir Korsunov (born 1983), Russian ice hockey player

== See also ==
- Korshunov
