= Yuri Pugachyov =

Russian footballer

Personal information
- Full name: Yuri Mikhailovich Pugachyov
- Date of birth: 25 February 1991 (age 35)
- Place of birth: Astrakhan, Russia
- Height: 1.80 m (5 ft 11 in)
- Position: Forward

Youth career
- FC Volgar Astrakhan
- 2007–2008: FC Spartak Moscow

Senior career*
Years	Team	Apps	(Gls)
2010	FC Ural Yekaterinburg	0	(0)
2010	Ulisses FC		
2011–2013	FC Astrakhan	55	(20)
2013–2015	FC Avangard Kursk	41	(10)
2015–2016	FC Astrakhan	7	(3)
2016	FC Neftekhimik Nizhnekamsk	6	(2)
2016–2017	FC Sakhalin Yuzhno-Sakhalinsk	9	(5)
2017–2018	FC Zenit-Izhevsk	15	(4)
2018–2021	FC Volgar Astrakhan	52	(13)
2021–2022	FC Dynamo Bryansk	28	(11)

International career
2008	Russia U-17		(1)
- * Club domestic league appearances and goals

Yuri Mikhailovich Pugachyov (Russian: Юрий Михайлович Пугачёв; born 25 February 1991) is a Russian former football player.

== Club career ==
He made his debut in the Russian Football National League for FC Volgar Astrakhan on 12 August 2020 in a game against FC Veles Moscow.
