= Anton Rudakov =

Russian footballer (born 1989)

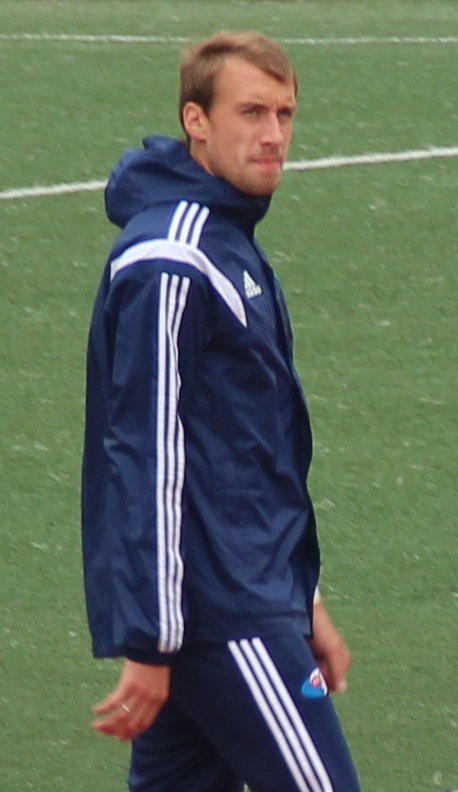

Personal information
- Full name: Anton Sergeyevich Rudakov
- Date of birth: 7 April 1989 (age 37)
- Place of birth: Yoshkar-Ola, Russia
- Height: 1.92 m (6 ft 3 1/2 in)
- Position: Defender

Youth career
- FC Khimki

Senior career*
Years	Team	Apps	(Gls)
2007	FC Khimki	0	(0)
2008	FC Dynamo Moscow	0	(0)
2008	FC Dynamo Moscow (Youth) (amateur)		
2009–2012	FC Dynamo Moscow	0	(0)
2011	→ FC Dynamo Stavropol (loan)	14	(0)
2012	→ FC Rusichi Oryol (loan)	8	(0)
2012–2013	FC Torpedo Moscow	1	(0)
2012	→ FC Volga Tver (loan)	7	(0)
2013–2014	FC Avangard Kursk	12	(0)
2014	FC Sakhalin Yuzhno-Sakhalinsk	2	(0)
2015	FC Kvazar Moscow		
2015–2017	FC Torpedo Vladimir	53	(4)

International career
2008	Russia U19	3	(0)
2008	Russia U21	1	(0)
- * Club domestic league appearances and goals

Anton Sergeyevich Rudakov (Russian: Антон Серге́евич Рудаков; born 7 April 1989) is a former Russian football defender.

== Club career ==
He made his debut in the Russian Second Division for FC Dynamo Stavropol on 17 April 2011 in a game against FC Astrakhan.

He made his Russian Football National League debut for FC Torpedo Moscow on 16 July 2012 in a game against FC Ufa.
