= Aleksandr Samokhvalov =

Aleksandr Samokhvalov may refer to:

- Aleksandr Samokhvalov (footballer) (born 1984), Russian footballer
- Alexander Samokhvalov (artist) (1894–1971), Russian/Soviet painter
