= Levan Dzharkava =

Russian footballer

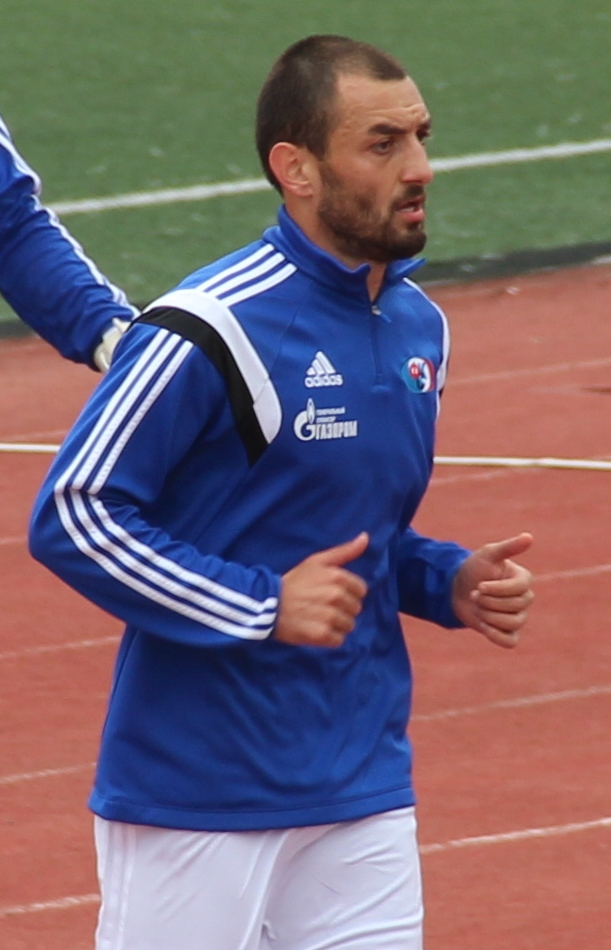

Personal information
- Full name: Levan Dzhambulovich Dzharkava
- Date of birth: 29 March 1988 (age 38)
- Height: 1.79 m (5 ft 10 1/2 in)
- Positions: Midfielder; defender

Youth career
- FC Spartak Moscow

Senior career*
Years	Team	Apps	(Gls)
2009	Hapoel Marmorek F.C.		
2010	FC Prialit Reutov		
2012–2013	FC Chernomorets Novorossiysk	11	(0)
2013–2014	FC Vityaz Krymsk	27	(0)
2014	FC Sakhalin Yuzhno-Sakhalinsk	14	(0)
2015	Ulisses FC	13	(0)
2015	FC Torpedo Armavir	15	(0)
- * Club domestic league appearances and goals

Levan Dzhambulovich Dzharkava (Russian: Леван Джамбулович Джаркава; born 29 March 1988) is a former Russian football player of Georgian descent.

== Club career ==
He made his debut in the Russian Second Division for FC Chernomorets Novorossiysk on 22 August 2012 in a game against FC Astrakhan.

He made his Russian Football National League debut for FC Sakhalin Yuzhno-Sakhalinsk on 6 July 2014 in a game against FC Anzhi Makhachkala. He played one more season in the FNL for FC Torpedo Armavir.
