= Artyom Bludnov =

Russian football midfielder

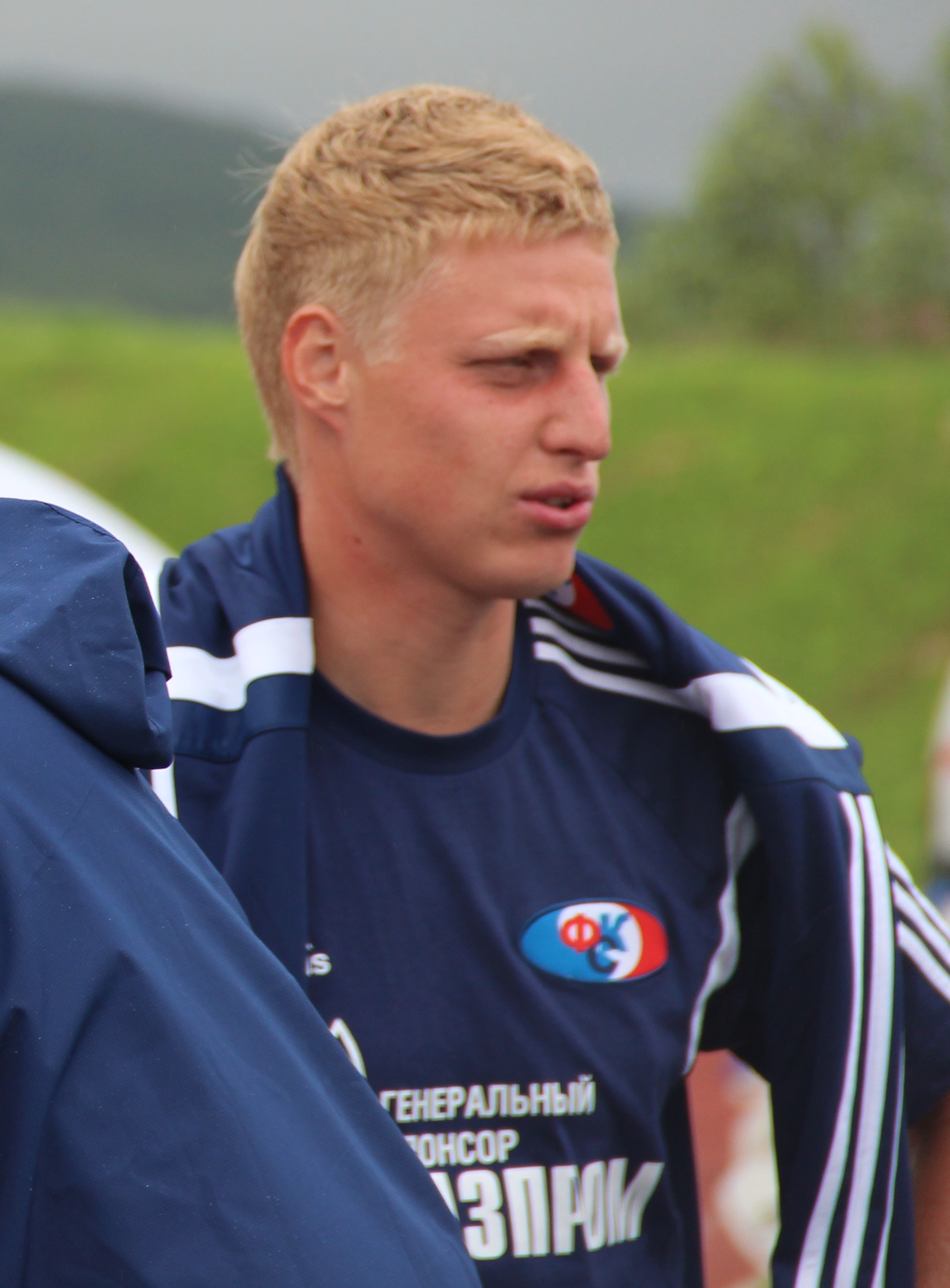

Personal information
- Full name: Artyom Olegovich Bludnov
- Date of birth: 5 September 1988 (age 38)
- Height: 1.85 m (6 ft 1 in)
- Position: Midfielder

Youth career
- Spartak Moscow

Senior career*
Years	Team	Apps	(Gls)
2008–2009	Dinaburg	10	(2)
2010–2011	Academia UTM	31	(7)
2011	→ Vitebsk (loan)	2	(0)
2011	Baltika Kaliningrad	11	(0)
2012	Academia UTM	12	(0)
2012–2013	Khimik Dzerzhinsk	28	(2)
2013–2014	Tekstilshchik Ivanovo	21	(0)
2014	Sakhalin Yuzhno-Sakhalinsk	4	(0)
2015	Neftekhimik Nizhnekamsk	8	(0)
2015–2016	Khimik Dzerzhinsk	15	(1)
2017	Domodedovo Moscow	10	(0)
- * Club domestic league appearances and goals

Artyom Olegovich Bludnov (Russian: Артём Олегович Блуднов; born 5 September 1988) is a Russian former football midfielder.

== Club career ==
He made his debut in the Russian Football National League for FC Baltika Kaliningrad on 19 August 2011 in a game against FC Shinnik Yaroslavl.
