= Vasili Pyanchenko =

Russian footballer

Personal information
- Full name: Vasili Vitalyevich Pyanchenko
- Date of birth: 21 July 1991 (age 35)
- Place of birth: Krasnoyarsk, Russia
- Height: 1.80 m (5 ft 11 in)
- Position: Midfielder

Senior career*
Years	Team	Apps	(Gls)
2009–2014	FC Yenisey Krasnoyarsk	68	(1)
2011–2012	→ FC Zenit-Izhevsk (loan)	22	(1)
2014	→ FC Sakhalin Yuzhno-Sakhalinsk (loan)	0	(0)
2014–2015	FC Metallurg Novokuznetsk	15	(3)
2015–2018	FC Syzran-2003	73	(9)
2020–2021	FC Akron Tolyatti	21	(1)
2021–2022	FC Sokol Saratov	32	(2)
2022–2023	FC Amkar Perm	40	(4)
2024	FC Lada-Tolyatti	25	(2)
- * Club domestic league appearances and goals as of 19 October 2024

Vasili Vitalyevich Pyanchenko (Russian: Василий Витальевич Пьянченко; born 21 July 1991) is a Russian professional football player.

== Club career ==
He made his Russian Football National League debut for FC Yenisey Krasnoyarsk on 16 July 2012 in a game against FC Ural Yekaterinburg. He played 2 seasons in the FNL with Yenisey.
