= Fail Mirgalimov =

Russian footballer

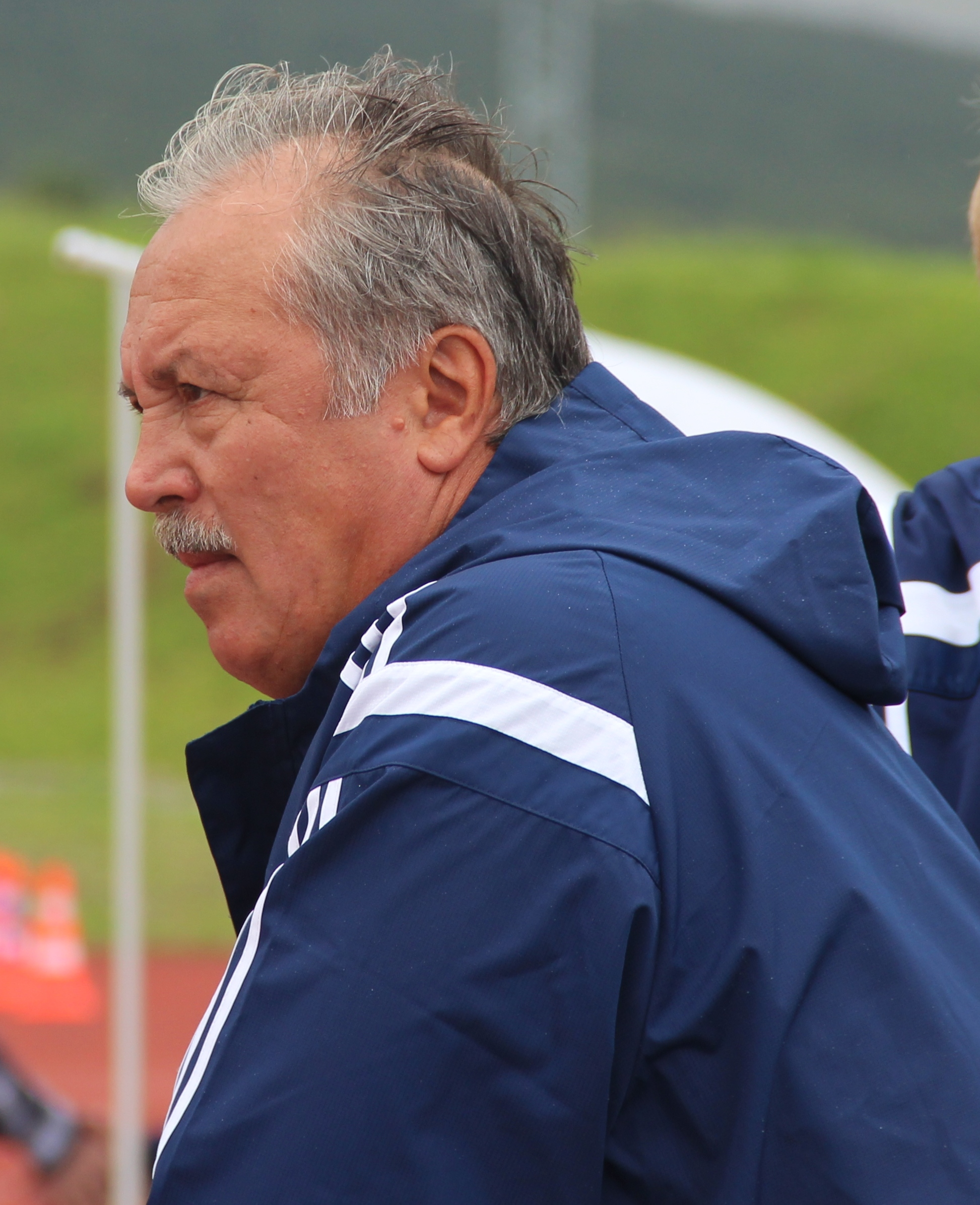

Personal information
- Full name: Fail Farasatovich Mirgalimov
- Date of birth: 29 March 1957 (age 69)
- Place of birth: Chelyabinsk, Russian SFSR
- Height: 1.86 m (6 ft 1 in)
- Positions: Forward; midfielder

Youth career
- Lokomotiv Chelyabinsk

Senior career*
Years	Team	Apps	(Gls)
1977	Start-Avia Sim		
1978–1979	Signal Chelyabinsk	43	(0)
1979	Uralmash Sverdlovsk	1	(0)
1980	Lokomotiv Chelyabinsk	31	(2)
1981	Yangiyer	20	(9)
1981–1982	Lokomotiv Chelyabinsk	53	(34)
1984	Lokomotiv Chelyabinsk	32	(28)
1984	Spartak Moscow	0	(0)
1985	Lokomotiv Chelyabinsk	22	(9)
1986	Lokomotiv Moscow	20	(5)
1987	Geolog Tyumen	18	(4)
1987	Lokomotiv Chelyabinsk	14	(0)
1988	Meliorator Chimkent	30	(12)
1989	Navbahor Namangan	13	(7)
1989	Strela Chelyabinsk	4	(1)
1989	Metallurg Magnitogorsk	9	(0)
1990	Halychyna Drohobych	40	(6)
1991	Antratsyt Kirovske		(26)
1991–1992	Wisłoka Dębica	5	(1)
1992	Zenit Chelyabinsk	16	(12)
1994	Almaz Chelyabinsk		
1994	Shakhtyor-Boga Korkino		

Managerial career
- 1985: Lokomotiv Chelyabinsk (assistant)
- 1991–1993: Feniks Chelyabinsk
- 1994: Stroitel-7 Chelyabinsk
- 1995–1997: FC Chelyabinets Chelyabinsk
- 1998–1999: Viz Yekaterinburg
- 2000–2002: Lukoil Chelyabinsk
- 2003–2004: Viz-Sinara Yekaterinburg
- 2004–2005: Spartak Shchyolkovo (futsal)
- 2005–2006: Zvezda Irkutsk (general director)
- 2007–2008: Zvezda Irkutsk
- 2009: Mash'al Mubarek (assistant)
- 2011–2013: Salyut Belgorod (advisor)
- 2014–2015: Sakhalin Yuzhno-Sakhalinsk
- * Club domestic league appearances and goals

Fail Farasatovich Mirgalimov (Russian: Фаиль Фарасатович Миргалимов; born 29 March 1957) is a Russian football manager and a former player.
