= Aleksandr Ilyin (footballer) =

Russian footballer

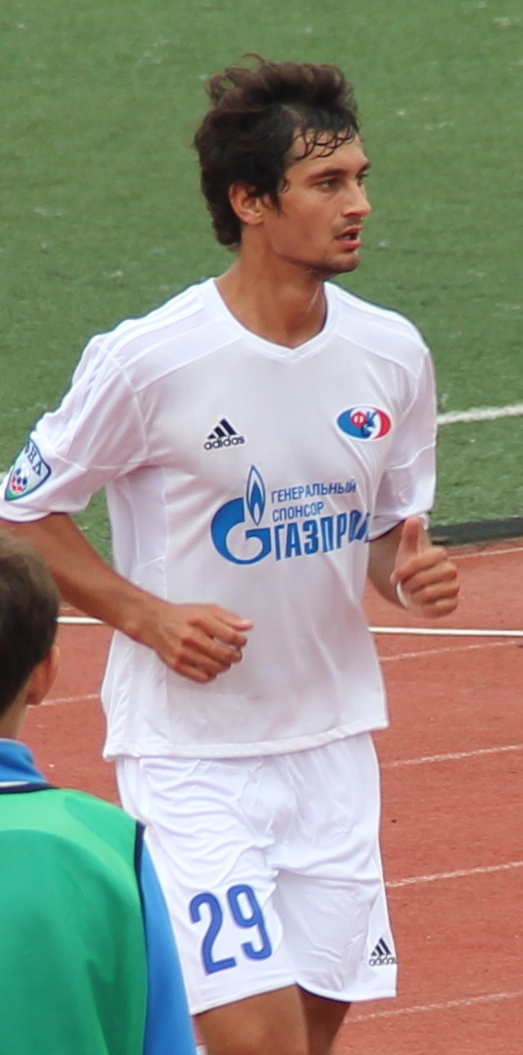
- Ilyin with FC Sakhalin in 2014

Personal information
- Full name: Aleksandr Vasilyevich Ilyin
- Date of birth: 5 February 1993 (age 33)
- Place of birth: Promyshlennaya, Russia
- Height: 1.84 m (6 ft 0 in)
- Position: Midfielder

Senior career*
Years	Team	Apps	(Gls)
2010	FC Spartak Moscow	0	(0)
2011–2015	FC Dynamo Moscow	1	(0)
2014–2015	→ FC Sakhalin Yuzhno-Sakhalinsk (loan)	13	(2)
2015	→ FC Dynamo St. Petersburg (loan)	7	(0)
2021	FC Kyzyltash Bakhchisaray (amateur)		
2021–2022	FC Znamya Truda Orekhovo-Zuyevo	19	(0)
- * Club domestic league appearances and goals

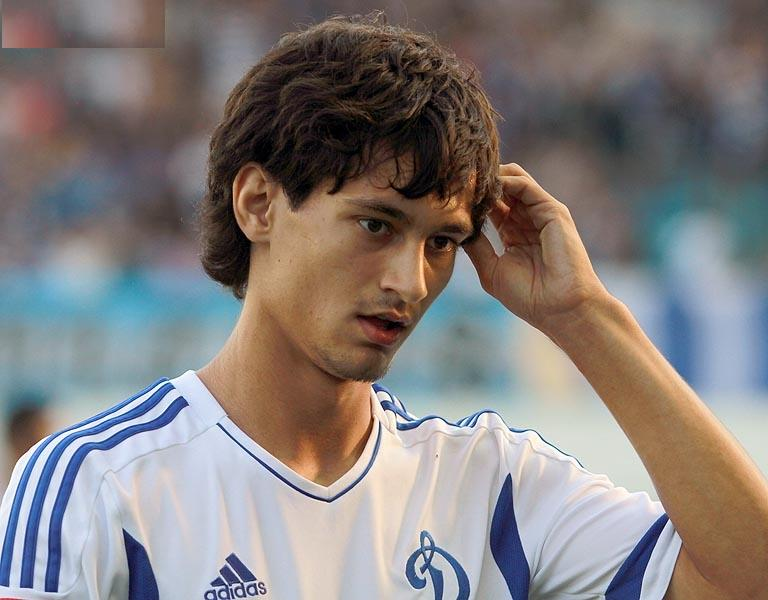
Ilyin with Dynamo Moscow in 2011

Aleksandr Vasilyevich Ilyin (Russian: Александр Васильевич Ильин; born 5 February 1993) is a Russian former professional football player.

== Club career ==
He made his Russian Premier League debut for FC Dynamo Moscow on 28 August 2011 in a game against PFC Spartak Nalchik, as a late substitute. That was his only official game for Dynamo Moscow main team, he mostly played for the reserve team of the club. Previously, he played for FC Spartak Moscow academy and reserves.

== 2015 road accident ==
On 12 September 2015, he was arrested and charged with causing a death by negligence due to driving under the influence of alcohol. According to the court case, he drove his car at high speed—the wrong way into the oncoming traffic for 7 kilometers—on Novopriozerskoye highway between villages Kerro and Agalatovo in the Vsevolozhsky District, in the St. Petersburg metropolitan area, hitting two cars and seriously injuring the people in those, before hitting a third car head-on and killing two passengers in that third car. The victims were a 28-year-old house painter Sergei Selivanov from St. Petersburg (a father of five children) and a 27-year-old engineer Maksim Kayumov.

On 5 September 2016, he was sentenced to 5 years and 10 month of imprisonment for the crash.
