= Giorgi Kakhelishvili =

Georgian footballer

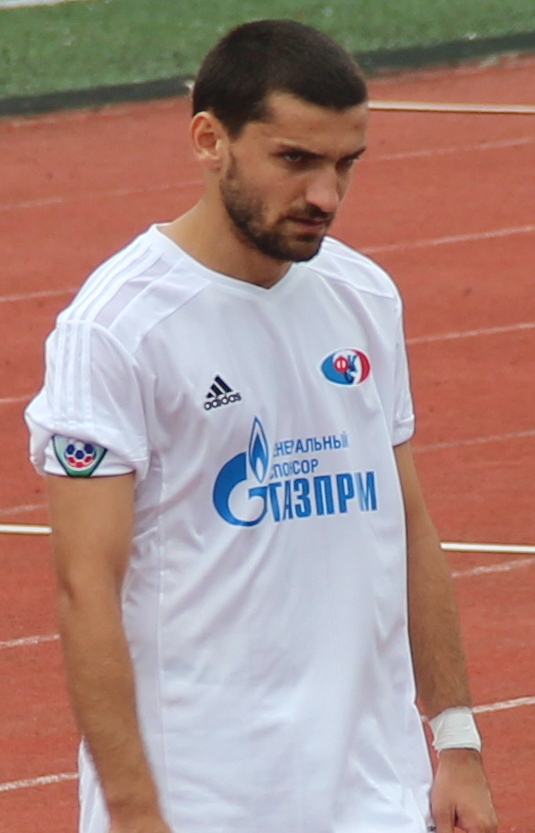

Personal information
- Date of birth: 22 May 1987 (age 39)
- Height: 1.78 m (5 ft 10 in)
- Position: Winger

Team information
- Current team: Merani Tbilisi
- Number: 11

Senior career*
Years	Team	Apps	(Gls)
2004–2006	FC Lokomotivi Tbilisi	41	(7)
2006–2008	FC Metalurgi Rustavi	45	(9)
2008–2009	FC Lokomotivi Tbilisi	24	(5)
2009	FC WIT Georgia	16	(0)
2010–2011	FC Dinamo Tbilisi	63	(2)
2012–2013	FC Dila Gori	41	(5)
2013–2014	FC Sioni Bolnisi	25	(6)
2014–2015	FC Sakhalin Yuzhno-Sakhalinsk	11	(0)
2015–2016	FC Torpedo Kutaisi	6	(0)
2016	FC Guria Lanchkhuti	9	(2)
2016	FC Tskhinvali	12	(1)
2017	FC Shevardeni		
2017	FC Shukura Kobuleti	16	(0)
2018	FC Kolkheti-1913 Poti	10	(1)
2018	FC Norchi Dinamoeli	8	(0)
2019–	Merani Tbilisi	14	(1)
- * Club domestic league appearances and goals as of 16 August 2019

Giorgi Kakhelishvili (Georgian: გიორგი კახელიშვილი; born May 22, 1987) is a Georgian football player who plays for Merani Tbilisi.

== Club career ==
He made his Russian National Football League debut for FC Sakhalin Yuzhno-Sakhalinsk on July 19, 2014 in a game against FC Baltika Kaliningrad.

== Honours ==
- Georgian Premier League champion: 2006/07.
- Georgian Cup winner: 2004/05, 2011/12.
- Georgian Super Cup winner: 2010.
