= Murtazi Alakhverdov =

Russian professional football player

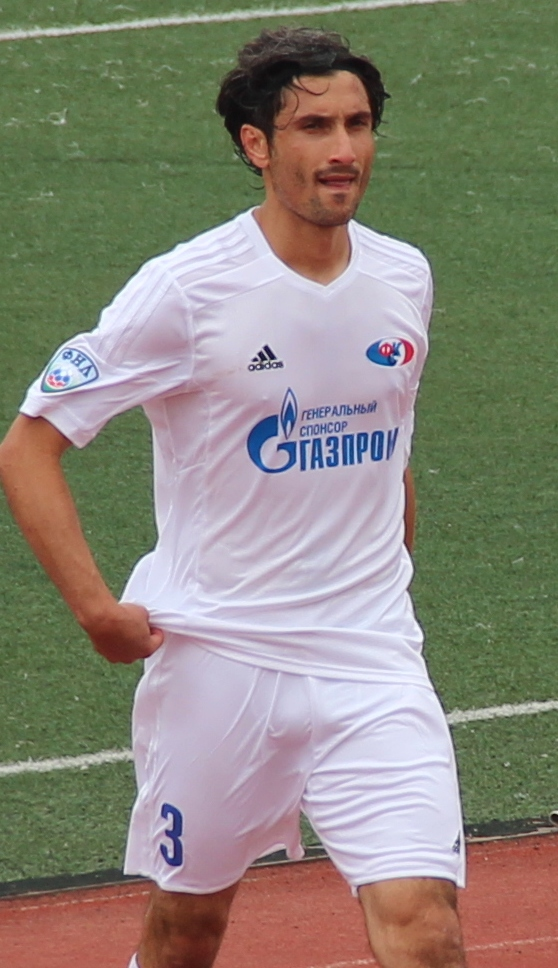

Personal information
- Full name: Murtazi Dzheyranovich Alakhverdov
- Date of birth: 12 September 1980 (age 46)
- Place of birth: Kareli, Georgian SSR
- Height: 1.87 m (6 ft 2 in)
- Position: Defender

Youth career
- FC Dila Gori

Senior career*
Years	Team	Apps	(Gls)
2001	FC Chkalovets-1936 Novosibirsk	2	(0)
2002	FC Shakhtyor Prokopyevsk	18	(0)
2004	FC Chkalovets Novosibirsk (amateur)		
2005–2006	FC Chkalovets Novosibirsk	60	(5)
2007–2008	FC Irtysh-1946 Omsk	55	(0)
2009	FC Dynamo Barnaul	6	(0)
2010–2011	FC Radian-Baikal Irkutsk	40	(2)
2011–2024	FC Sakhalin Yuzhno-Sakhalinsk	264	(16)
- * Club domestic league appearances and goals

Murtazi Dzheyranovich Alakhverdov (Russian: Муртази Джейранович Алахвердов; born 12 September 1980) is a Russian former professional football player.

== Club career ==
He made his Russian Football National League debut for FC Sakhalin Yuzhno-Sakhalinsk on 6 July 2014 in a game against FC Anzhi Makhachkala.
