= Andrei Kondratyuk =

Russian footballer

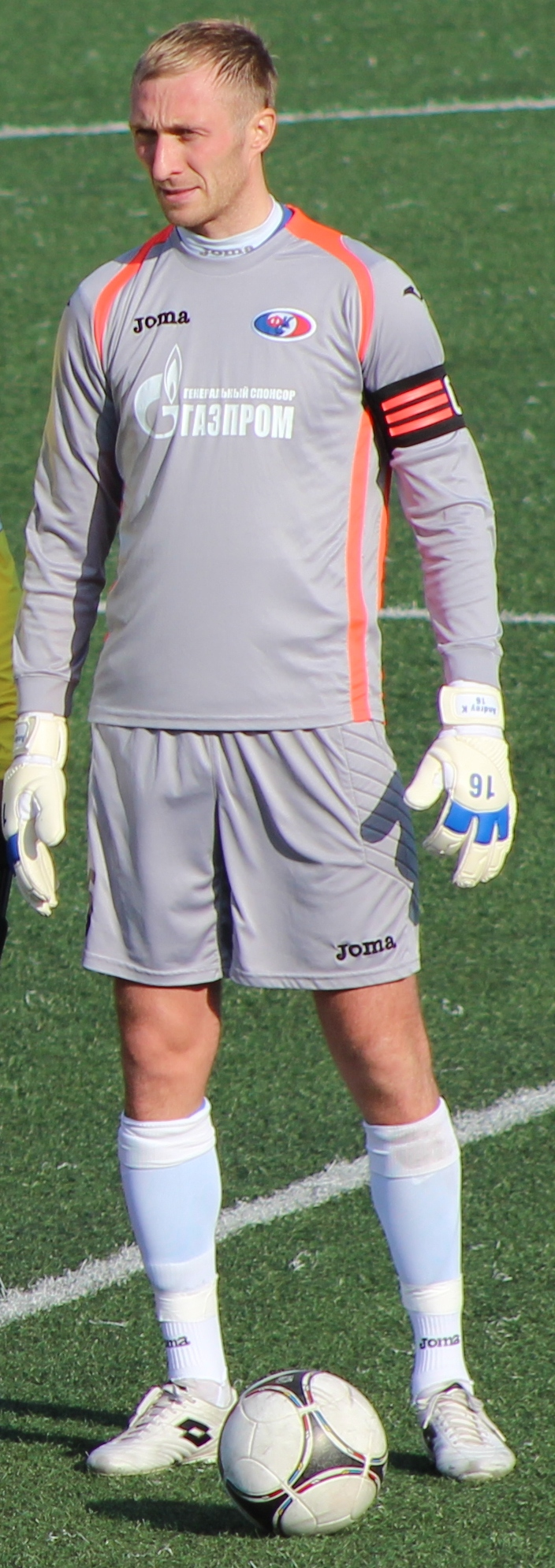

Personal information
- Full name: Andrei Nikolayevich Kondratyuk
- Date of birth: 20 December 1982 (age 43)
- Place of birth: Moscow, Russian SFSR
- Height: 1.92 m (6 ft 4 in)
- Position: Goalkeeper

Team information
- Current team: FC Rostov (GK coach)

Youth career
- SDYuSShOR-44 Krasnogvardeyets Moscow

Senior career*
Years	Team	Apps	(Gls)
2002–2003	FC Krasnodar-2000	14	(0)
2004	FC Vityaz Krymsk	17	(0)
2004–2005	FC Dynamo Makhachkala	6	(0)
2005–2008	FC Mashuk-KMV Pyatigorsk	85	(0)
2009	FC Volga Nizhny Novgorod	1	(0)
2010	FC Dynamo Stavropol	10	(0)
2010	FC Bashinformsvyaz-Dynamo Ufa	8	(0)
2011–2016	FC Sakhalin Yuzhno-Sakhalinsk	110	(0)
2016–2017	FC Chayka Peschanokopskoye	5	(0)
2018	FC Rostselmash Rostov-on-Don (amateur)		
2019	FC Azov		

Managerial career
- 2021–: FC Rostov (GK coach)
- * Club domestic league appearances and goals

Andrei Nikolayevich Kondratyuk (Russian: Андрей Николаевич Кондратюк; born 20 December 1982) is a Russian professional football coach and a former player. He is the goalkeepers' coach at FC Rostov.

== Club career ==
He played 7 seasons in the Russian Football National League for 4 different clubs.
