= Yuri Kuleshov =

Russian footballer and coach

Personal information
- Full name: Yuri Vladimirovich Kuleshov
- Date of birth: 12 April 1981 (age 45)
- Place of birth: Ryazan, Russian SFSR
- Height: 1.76 m (5 ft 9 1/2 in)
- Position: Defensive midfielder

Senior career*
Years	Team	Apps	(Gls)
2000–2008	Ryazan	288	(18)
2009–2013	Mordovia Saransk	132	(5)
2013–2014	Torpedo Moscow	38	(0)
2015	Sakhalin Yuzhno-Sakhalinsk	13	(0)
2015–2019	Ryazan	88	(2)

Managerial career
- 2019–2024: Ryazan (assistant)
- 2024–2026: Ryazan
- * Club domestic league appearances and goals

Yuri Vladimirovich Kuleshov (Russian: Юрий Владимирович Кулешов; born 12 April 1981) is a Russian professional football coach and a former defensive midfielder.

== Career ==
In March 2015, Kuleshov signed for FC Sakhalin Yuzhno-Sakhalinsk.
