= Dmitriý Neželew =

Turkmenistani footballer

Dmitri Nezhelev
Personal information
- Full name: Dmitri Gennadyevich Nezhelev
- Date of birth: 27 February 1970 (age 56)
- Place of birth: Ashgabat, Turkmen SSR
- Height: 1.66 m (5 ft 5 1/2 in)
- Position: Midfielder

Senior career*
Years	Team	Apps	(Gls)
1988–1991	Köpetdag Aşgabat	77	(9)
1992–1994	Uralmash Yekaterinburg	83	(5)
1995–1996	Zenit Saint Petersburg	39	(3)
1996–1998	Gazovik-Gazprom Izhevsk	70	(8)
1999–2002	Kristall Smolensk	123	(9)
2004	Darida Minsk Raion	14	(0)
2004	Khazar Lankaran	8	(0)
2005–2007	Smolensk	68	(5)

International career
1998–2001	Turkmenistan	4	(1)
- * Club domestic league appearances and goals

Dmitri Gennadyevich Nezhelev (Russian: Дмитрий Геннадьевич Нежелев; born 27 February 1970) is a retired Turkmenistani professional footballer.

== Career ==
He made his professional debut in the Soviet Second League in 1988 for Köpetdag Aşgabat.

== Personal life ==
His younger brother Anatoli Nezhelev is also a professional footballer.
