= Eldar Mamayev =

Russian footballer

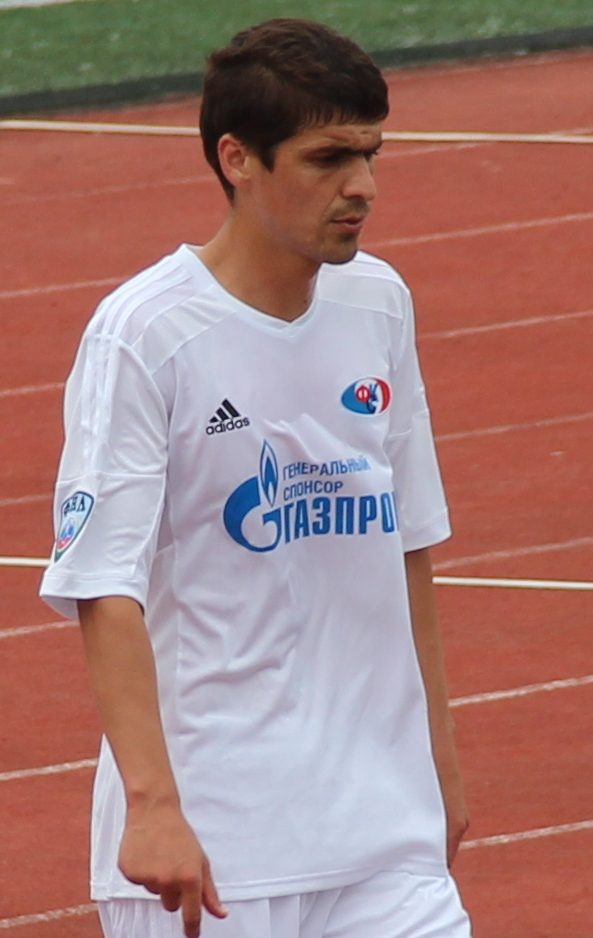

Personal information
- Full name: Eldar Kamilyevich Mamayev
- Date of birth: 14 June 1985 (age 41)
- Place of birth: Buynaksk, Dagestan, Russia
- Height: 1.82 m (6 ft 0 in)
- Position: Midfielder

Youth career
- DYuSSh Olimp Makhachkala
- RSDYuShOR-2 Makhachkala

Senior career*
Years	Team	Apps	(Gls)
2001–2010	FC Anzhi Makhachkala	206	(15)
2010	FC Ural Sverdlovsk Oblast	11	(0)
2011–2012	FC Nizhny Novgorod	27	(1)
2012	FC Khimki	8	(0)
2013–2014	FC Sever Murmansk	20	(2)
2014–2015	FC Sakhalin Yuzhno-Sakhalinsk	33	(1)
- * Club domestic league appearances and goals

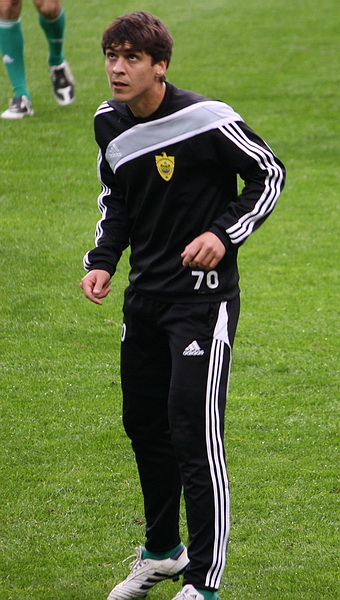
Eldar Mamayev in 2010

Eldar Kamilyevich Mamayev (Russian: Эльдар Камильевич Мамаев, Kumyk: Мамайланы Элдар Камилны уланы, romanized: Mamaylanı Eldar Kamilnı ulanı; born 14 June 1985) is a former Russian professional footballer.

== Club career ==
He made his professional debut in the Russian First Division in 2003 for FC Anzhi Makhachkala.
