= Anatoli Nezhelev =

Turkmen-born Russian footballer

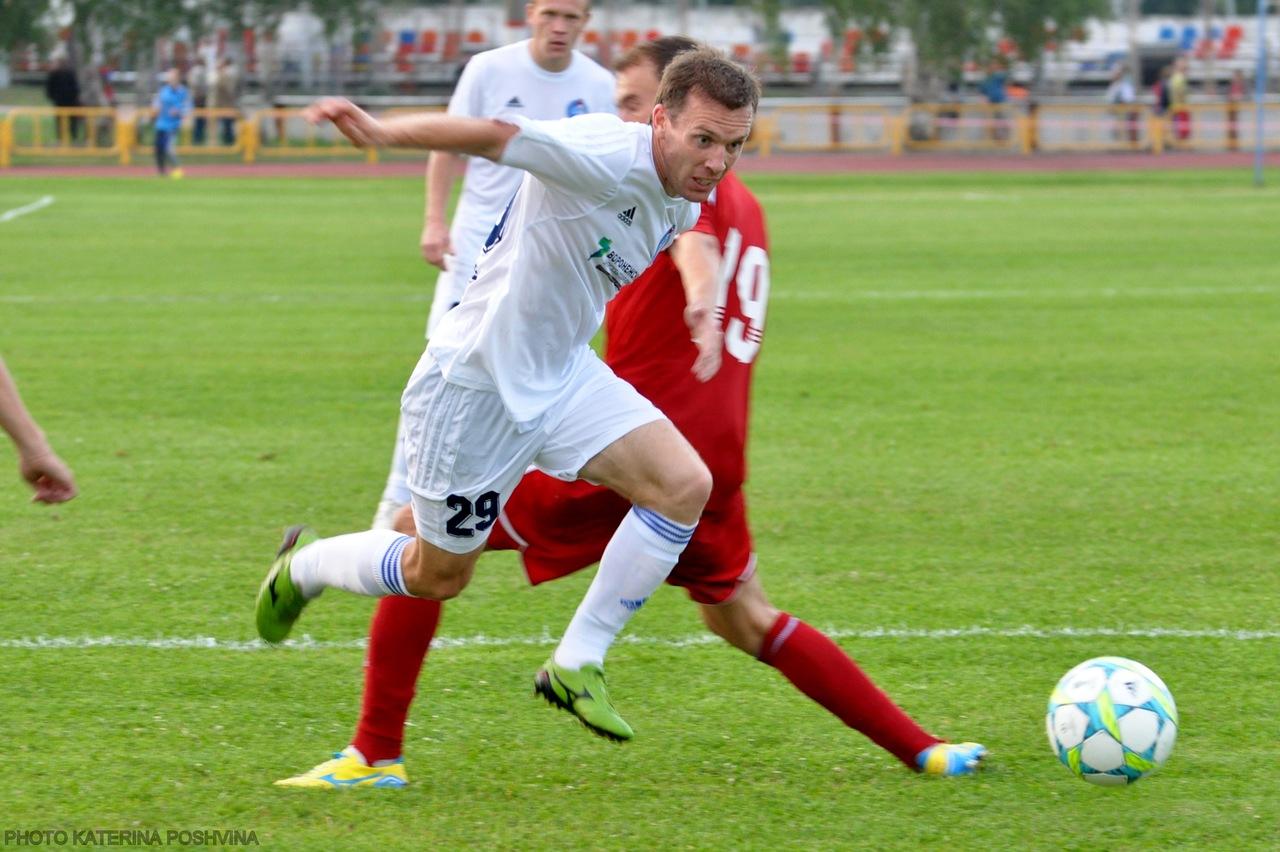

Personal information
- Full name: Anatoli Gennadyevich Nezhelev
- Date of birth: 25 May 1985 (age 41)
- Place of birth: Ashgabat, Turkmenistan
- Height: 1.74 m (5 ft 9 in)
- Position: Midfielder

Team information
- Current team: FC Dynamo Kirov (assistant coach)

Senior career*
Years	Team	Apps	(Gls)
2003–2005	FC Shinnik Yaroslavl	4	(0)
2006	FC Spartak Kostroma	29	(4)
2007	FC Rotor Volgograd	13	(1)
2007	FK Jūrmala	13	(2)
2008	FC Salyut-Energia Belgorod	17	(0)
2008–2009	FC Avangard Kursk	43	(7)
2010	FC Khimki	36	(2)
2011–2013	FC Shinnik Yaroslavl	71	(1)
2013–2014	FC Fakel Voronezh	23	(3)
2015–2016	FC Tyumen	31	(4)
2016–2018	FC Nizhny Novgorod	66	(5)
2019	FC Urozhay Krasnodar	7	(1)

Managerial career
- 2021: FC Dynamo Moscow (U19 fitness coach)
- 2021–2022: FC Spartak Moscow (fitness coach)
- 2024–: FC Dynamo Kirov (assistant)
- * Club domestic league appearances and goals

Anatoli Gennadyevich Nezhelev (Russian: Анатолий Геннадьевич Нежелев; born 25 May 1985) is a Russian professional football coach and a former player. He is an assistant coach with FC Dynamo Kirov.

== Club career ==
He made his debut in the Russian Premier League in 2005 for FC Shinnik Yaroslavl.

== Personal life ==
His older brother Dmitri Nezhelev also played football professionally.
