= Nikita Satalkin =

Russian footballer

Personal information
- Full name: Nikita Vladimirovich Satalkin
- Date of birth: 13 October 1987 (age 39)
- Place of birth: Orenburg, Russian SFSR
- Height: 1.82 m (6 ft 0 in)
- Positions: Striker; midfielder

Senior career*
Years	Team	Apps	(Gls)
2004–2010	FC Gazovik Orenburg	131	(34)
2010	→ FC Luch-Energiya Vladivostok (loan)	36	(9)
2011	FC Zhemchuzhina-Sochi	8	(1)
2011–2012	FC Torpedo Moscow	22	(5)
2012	FC SKA-Energiya Khabarovsk	14	(1)
2013–2014	FC Gazovik Orenburg	27	(5)
2014–2015	FC Sakhalin Yuzhno-Sakhalinsk	19	(9)
2015	FC Volga Nizhny Novgorod	21	(5)
2016	FC Gazovik Orenburg	13	(1)
2016–2017	FC Fakel Voronezh	26	(6)
2018	FC Orenburg-2	4	(0)
- * Club domestic league appearances and goals

Nikita Vladimirovich Satalkin (Russian: Никита Владимирович Саталкин; born 13 October 1987) is a Russian former professional football player.

== Club career ==
He played 7 seasons in the Russian Football National League for 8 different clubs.
