= Sergei Vinogradov (footballer, born 1981) =

Russian footballer

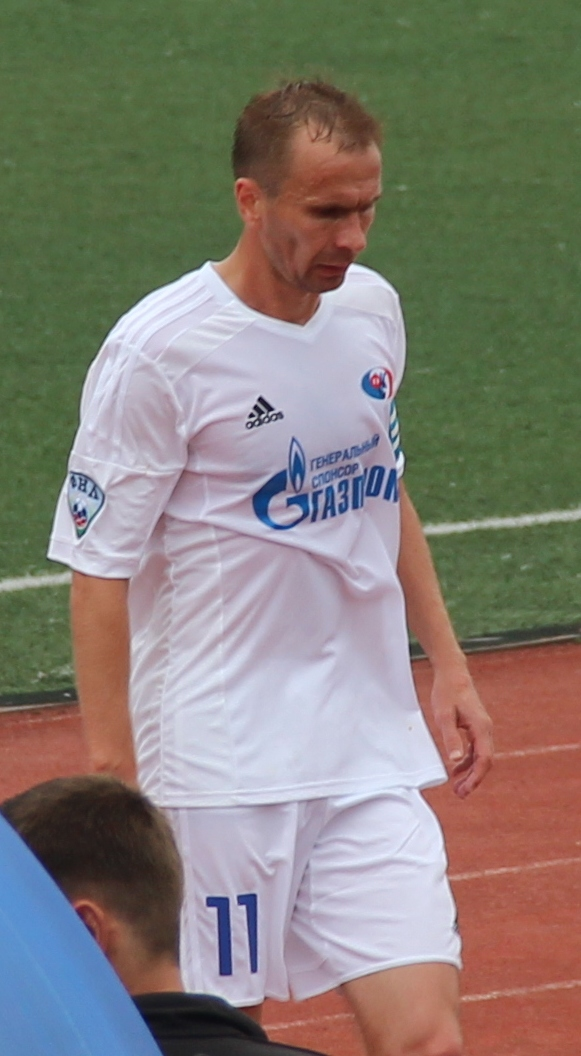

Personal information
- Full name: Sergei Leonidovich Vinogradov
- Date of birth: 17 November 1981 (age 44)
- Place of birth: Pskov, Russian SFSR
- Height: 1.76 m (5 ft 9 1/2 in)
- Position: Forward

Youth career
- 1997–1998: Mashinostroitel Pskov

Senior career*
Years	Team	Apps	(Gls)
1999–2000	Pskov	31	(7)
2001–2006	Krylia Sovetov Samara	129	(13)
2007	Rostov	11	(1)
2008	Kuban Krasnodar	12	(1)
2008	Anzhi Makhachkala	15	(1)
2009	Stavropolye-2009	17	(4)
2009–2010	Volga Nizhny Novgorod	35	(3)
2011–2016	Sakhalin Yuzhno-Sakhalinsk	142	(29)
2016–2017	Vitebsk	21	(1)
2017	Meshakhte Tkibuli	3	(0)

International career
2003	Russia U-21	8	(3)
- * Club domestic league appearances and goals

Sergei Leonidovich Vinogradov (Russian: Серге́й Леонидович Виноградов; born 17 November 1981) is a Russian former professional football player.

== Club career ==
He made his debut in the Russian Premier League in 2001 for FC Krylia Sovetov Samara. He played for FC Krylia Sovetov Samara in the UEFA Cup.

== Honours ==
- Russian Premier League bronze: 2004.
- Russian Cup finalist: 2004.
