= Denis Skorokhodov =

Russian footballer

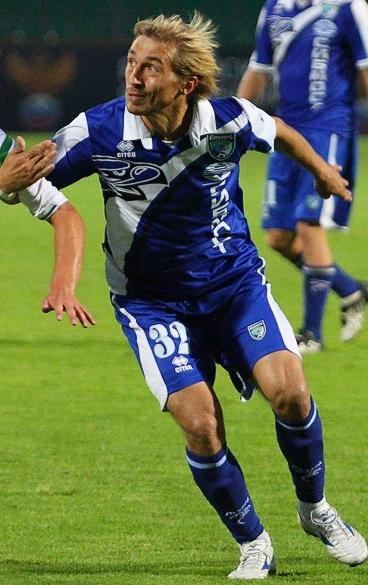
- Skorokhodov with FC Sibir Novosibirsk

Personal information
- Full name: Denis Aleksandrovich Skorokhodov
- Date of birth: 23 September 1981 (age 45)
- Place of birth: Moscow, Russian SFSR
- Height: 1.80 m (5 ft 11 in)
- Positions: Midfielder; forward

Youth career
- FC FShM Torpedo Moscow

Senior career*
| Years | Team | Apps | (Gls) |
| 1999–2000 | FC Torpedo-2 Moscow | 62 | (5) |
| 2001–2007 | FC Sibir Novosibirsk | 220 | (26) |
| 2008–2009 | FC KAMAZ Naberezhnye Chelny | 44 | (3) |
| 2010 | FC Dynamo Barnaul | 29 | (1) |
| 2011–2016 | FC Sibir Novosibirsk | 115 | (9) |
| 2016 | Neva Moscow | | |
- * Club domestic league appearances and goals

Denis Aleksandrovich Skorokhodov (Russian: Денис Александрович Скороходов; born 23 September 1981) is a former Russian professional footballer.

== Club career ==
He played 10 seasons in the Russian Football National League for FC Sibir Novosibirsk and FC KAMAZ Naberezhnye Chelny.
