= Vladimir Mikhalyov =

Russian footballer

Personal information
- Full name: Vladimir Aleksandrovich Mikhalyov
- Date of birth: 20 July 1987 (age 39)
- Place of birth: Sakhalin Oblast, Russian SFSR
- Height: 1.71 m (5 ft 7 1/2 in)
- Position: Midfielder

Youth career
- FC Olimpia Volgograd

Senior career*
Years	Team	Apps	(Gls)
2002–2007	FC Olimpia Volgograd	128	(36)
2008–2010	FC Volga Nizhny Novgorod	13	(0)
2009–2010	→ FC Luch-Energiya Vladivostok (loan)	51	(4)
2011	FC Volgar-Gazprom Astrakhan	7	(0)
2011–2012	FC Mostovik-Primorye Ussuriysk	13	(1)
2012–2018	FC Sakhalin Yuzhno-Sakhalinsk	92	(14)
- * Club domestic league appearances and goals

Vladimir Aleksandrovich Mikhalyov (Russian: Владимир Александрович Михалёв; born 20 July 1987) is a former Russian professional football player.

== Club career ==
He played 4 seasons in the Russian Football National League for FC Luch-Energiya Vladivostok, FC Volgar-Gazprom Astrakhan and FC Sakhalin Yuzhno-Sakhalinsk.
