= Eduard Sukhanov =

Russian footballer (born 1991)

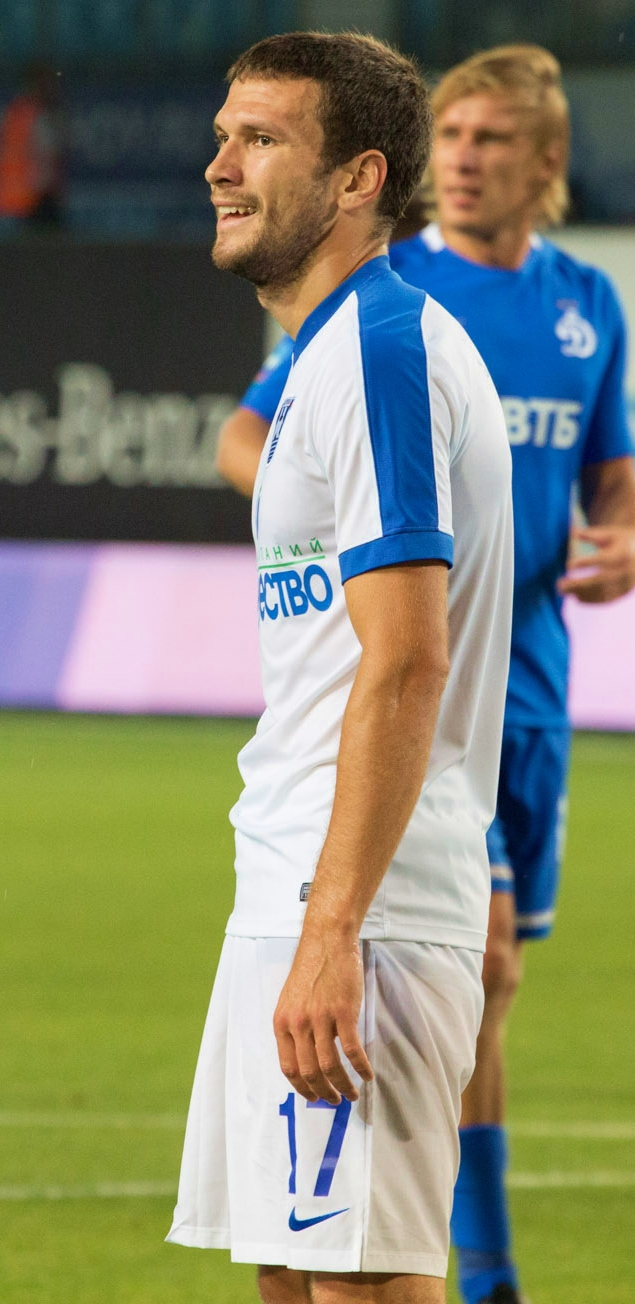
- Sukhanov with Baltika in 2016

Personal information
- Full name: Eduard Aleksandrovich Sukhanov
- Date of birth: 22 April 1991 (age 35)
- Place of birth: Izhevsk, Russian SFSR
- Height: 1.77 m (5 ft 9 1/2 in)
- Position: Midfielder

Youth career
- Konoplyov football academy

Senior career*
Years	Team	Apps	(Gls)
2008–2009	Academia Dimitrovgrad	23	(1)
2010	Vityaz Podolsk	3	(0)
2010	Rubin-2 Kazan	8	(0)
2011–2013	Ventspils	64	(10)
2014–2016	Volga Nizhny Novgorod	45	(1)
2016–2017	Baltika Kaliningrad	27	(1)
2017–2019	Armavir	52	(3)
2019	Gomel	10	(0)
2020	Aktobe	9	(4)
2021–2025	Leningradets	114	(8)

International career
2008	Russia U17	6	(0)
2009	Russia U18	4	(1)
- * Club domestic league appearances and goals as of 11 February 2026

Eduard Aleksandrovich Sukhanov (Russian: Эдуа́рд Алекса́ндрович Суха́нов; born 22 April 1991) is a Russian former professional football player.

== Club career ==
He made his Russian Football National League debut for FC Volga Nizhny Novgorod on 24 August 2014 in a game against FC Dynamo Saint Petersburg.
