= Yevgeni Matrakhov =

Russian footballer

Personal information
- Full name: Yevgeni Olegovich Matrakhov
- Date of birth: 10 August 1990 (age 36)
- Place of birth: Leningrad, Russian SFSR
- Height: 1.76 m (5 ft 9 in)
- Position: Midfielder

Senior career*
Years	Team	Apps	(Gls)
2008	FC Zenit-2 St. Petersburg	18	(1)
2009	FC Rostov	0	(0)
2010–2011	FC Vityaz Podolsk	47	(1)
2012–2013	FC Petrotrest St. Petersburg	31	(0)
2013	FC Dynamo St. Petersburg	17	(0)
2014	FC Sever Murmansk	8	(0)
2014–2015	FC Dynamo St. Petersburg	28	(0)
2015–2024	FC Sakhalin Yuzhno-Sakhalinsk	194	(40)
- * Club domestic league appearances and goals as of 3 November 2024

Yevgeni Olegovich Matrakhov (Russian: Евгений Олегович Матрахов; born 10 August 1990) is a Russian professional footballer.

== Club career ==
He made his professional debut in the Russian Second Division in 2008 for FC Zenit-2 St. Petersburg.

He made his Russian Football National League debut for FC Petrotrest Saint Petersburg on 9 July 2012 in a game against FC Ural Yekaterinburg.
