= Nikita Timoshin =

Russian footballer

Personal information
- Full name: Nikita Borisovich Timoshin
- Date of birth: 22 April 1988 (age 38)
- Place of birth: Makhachkala, Soviet Union
- Height: 1.85 m (6 ft 1 in)
- Positions: Defender; midfielder

Senior career*
Years	Team	Apps	(Gls)
2006	FC Presnya Moscow	8	(0)
2007	FC Sokol-Saratov	11	(0)
2008–2013	FC Avangard Kursk	88	(15)
2013	PFC Spartak Nalchik	21	(0)
2014	FC Fakel Voronezh	6	(1)
2014–2015	FC Shinnik Yaroslavl	22	(3)
2015	FC Tosno	14	(0)
2016–2017	FC Fakel Voronezh	3	(0)
2017	→ FC Baltika Kaliningrad (loan)	14	(0)
2017–2018	FC Baltika Kaliningrad	23	(0)
2018–2020	FC Avangard Kursk	19	(0)
- * Club domestic league appearances and goals

Nikita Borisovich Timoshin (Russian: Никита Борисович Тимошин; born 22 April 1988) is a Russian former professional football player.

== Club career ==
He made his Russian Football National League debut for FC Avangard Kursk on 31 March 2010 in a game against FC Khimki.
