= Aleksandr Samokhvalov (footballer) =

Russian footballer

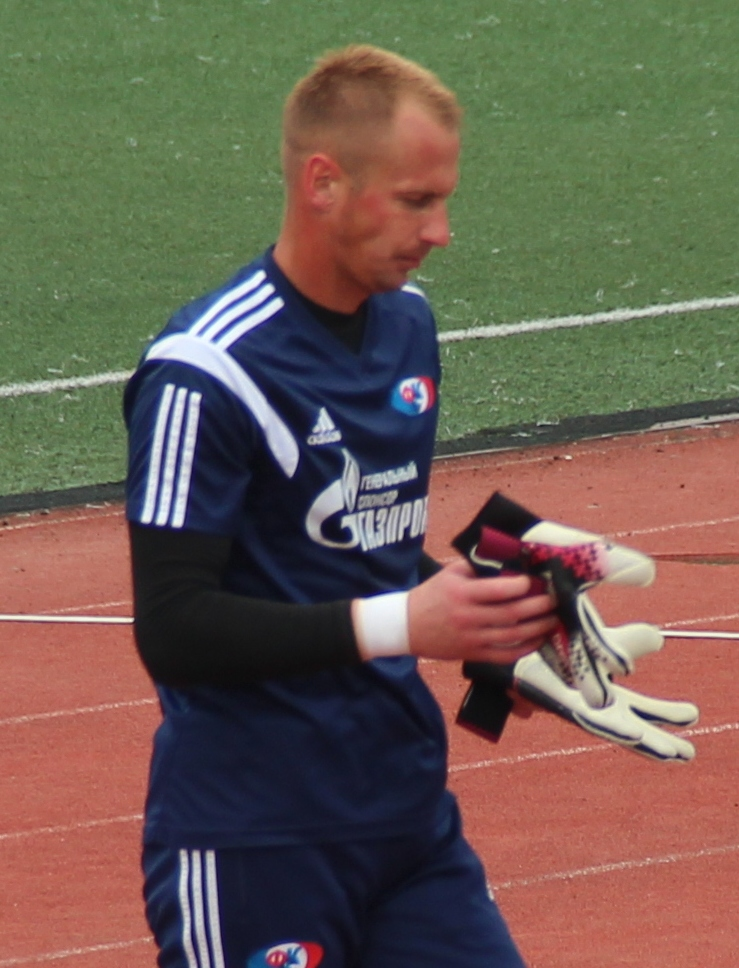

Personal information
- Full name: Aleksandr Aleksandrovich Samokhvalov
- Date of birth: 15 April 1984 (age 42)
- Place of birth: Leningrad, Russian SFSR
- Height: 1.94 m (6 ft 4 1/2 in)
- Position: Goalkeeper

Team information
- Current team: FC Dynamo Saint Petersburg (GK coach)

Senior career*
Years	Team	Apps	(Gls)
2002–2003	FC Dynamo-SPb St. Petersburg	3	(0)
2004	FC Severstal Cherepovets	13	(0)
2005–2006	FC Volga Nizhny Novgorod	6	(0)
2007	FC Chayka Uglich		
2008	FC Neftekhimik Nizhnekamsk	33	(0)
2009	FC Torpedo Vladimir	16	(0)
2010	FC Sokol Saratov	9	(0)
2011–2012	FC Tekstilshchik Ivanovo	24	(0)
2012–2013	FC Petrotrest Saint Petersburg	21	(0)
2013–2014	FC Dynamo Saint Petersburg	27	(0)
2014	FC Sakhalin Yuzhno-Sakhalinsk	7	(0)
2015–2017	FC Neftekhimik Nizhnekamsk	49	(0)

Managerial career
- 2017–2020: Shinnik Nizhnekamsk (assistant)
- 2021–2023: FC Zvezda Saint Petersburg (GK coach)
- 2024–: FC Dynamo Saint Petersburg (GK coach)
- * Club domestic league appearances and goals

Aleksandr Aleksandrovich Samokhvalov (Russian: Александр Александрович Самохвалов; born 15 April 1984) is a Russian professional football coach and a former player. He is a goalkeeping coach with FC Dynamo Saint Petersburg.

== Club career ==
He played 5 seasons in the Russian Football National League for 4 different teams.
