= Aleksandr Gagloyev =

Russian footballer

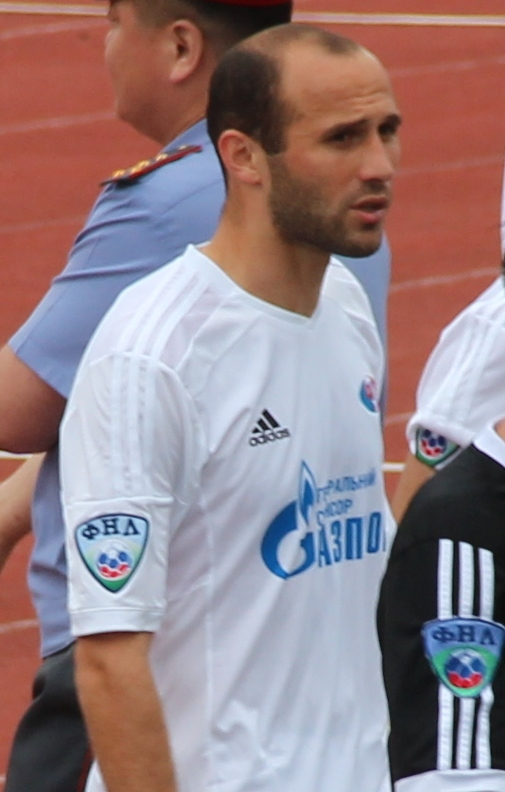

Personal information
- Full name: Aleksandr Sergeyevich Gagloyev
- Date of birth: 13 December 1990 (age 35)
- Place of birth: Tskhinvali, Georgian SSR
- Height: 1.81 m (5 ft 11 in)
- Position: Midfielder

Senior career*
Years	Team	Apps	(Gls)
2007–2012	FC Alania Vladikavkaz	32	(0)
2010	→ FC Neftekhimik Nizhnekamsk (loan)	24	(3)
2011	→ FC Gazovik Orenburg (loan)	13	(1)
2012	FC Biolog-Novokubansk Progress	7	(1)
2013–2016	FC Sakhalin Yuzhno-Sakhalinsk	84	(35)
2016–2017	FC Neftekhimik Nizhnekamsk	12	(1)
2017–2019	FC Sakhalin Yuzhno-Sakhalinsk	38	(28)
2019–2021	FC KAMAZ Naberezhnye Chelny	64	(27)
2022	FC SKA-Khabarovsk	13	(2)
2022–2024	FC KAMAZ Naberezhnye Chelny	55	(8)
2024–2026	FC SKA-Khabarovsk	46	(2)
- * Club domestic league appearances and goals as of 16 May 2026

Aleksandr Sergeyevich Gagloyev (Russian: Александр Серге́евич Гаглоев; born 13 December 1990) is a Russian former professional footballer.

== Club career ==
He made his professional debut in the Russian Football National League in 2007 for FC Alania Vladikavkaz.

== Honours ==
- Russian Professional Football League Zone East Best Player: 2015–16.
