= Aleksei Korbut =

Russian footballer

Personal information
- Full name: Aleksei Aleksandrovich Korbut
- Date of birth: 27 June 1981 (age 45)
- Place of birth: Stavropol, Russian SFSR
- Height: 1.72 m (5 ft 8 in)
- Position: Defender

Senior career*
Years	Team	Apps	(Gls)
1998–2000	FC Dynamo Stavropol	7	(0)
2001	FC Spartak-Kavkaztransgaz Izobilny	19	(0)
2001–2002	FC Metallurg Krasnoyarsk	29	(0)
2003–2004	FC Dynamo Stavropol	47	(2)
2005	FC Volga Nizhny Novgorod	18	(0)
2006	FC Metallurg-Kuzbass Novokuznetsk	28	(0)
2007	FC Mashuk-KMV Pyatigorsk	21	(0)
2008	FC Volgar-Gazprom-2 Astrakhan	28	(0)
2009	FC Stavropol	16	(0)
2010	FC Rusichi Oryol	22	(0)
2011–2015	FC Sakhalin Yuzhno-Sakhalinsk	101	(0)
2015–2016	FC Dynamo Stavropol	21	(0)
2016	FC Iskra Novoaleksandrovsk (amateur)		
- * Club domestic league appearances and goals

Aleksei Aleksandrovich Korbut (Russian: Алексей Александрович Корбут; born 27 June 1981) is a former Russian professional football player.

== Club career ==
He played 5 seasons in the Russian Football National League for 4 different clubs.
