= Maksim Korshunov (footballer) =

Russian footballer

Personal information
- Full name: Maksim Vasilyevich Korshunov
- Date of birth: 11 April 1993 (age 33)
- Height: 1.70 m (5 ft 7 in)
- Position: Midfielder

Team information
- Current team: FC Novokuznetsk (amateur)

Senior career*
Years	Team	Apps	(Gls)
2012–2013	FC Metallurg-Kuzbass Novokuznetsk	5	(0)
2013	FC Kaluga	12	(1)
2014	FC Sakhalin Yuzhno-Sakhalinsk	5	(0)
2014–2015	FC Metallurg Novokuznetsk	1	(0)
2015–2017	FC Novokuznetsk (amateur)		
2018–2019	FC Shakhta Raspadskaya Mezhdurechensk (amateur)		
2019–	FC Novokuznetsk (amateur)		
- * Club domestic league appearances and goals as of 04:41, 8 June 2015 (UTC)

Maksim Vasilyevich Korshunov (Russian: Максим Васильевич Коршунов; born 11 April 1993) is a Russian football midfielder. He plays for FC Novokuznetsk.

== Club career ==
He made his debut in the Russian Football National League for FC Metallurg-Kuzbass Novokuznetsk on 28 August 2012 in a game against FC Volgar Astrakhan.
