= Aleksei Shlyapkin =

Russian footballer

Personal information
- Full name: Aleksei Viktorovich Shlyapkin
- Date of birth: 17 August 1987 (age 39)
- Place of birth: Almetyevsk, Tatarstan, Russian SFSR
- Height: 1.71 m (5 ft 7 1/2 in)
- Positions: Defender; midfielder

Senior career*
Years	Team	Apps	(Gls)
2004–2008	FC Alnas Almetyevsk	87	(8)
2009	FC Baltika Kaliningrad	12	(1)
2010–2012	FC KAMAZ Naberezhnye Chelny	61	(2)
2012–2013	FC Gazovik Orenburg	24	(1)
2014–2017	FC Tyumen	120	(2)
2018	FC Syzran-2003	8	(0)
2018–2019	FC Volga Ulyanovsk	23	(0)
2019–2020	FC Lada Dimitrovgrad	17	(1)
- * Club domestic league appearances and goals

Aleksei Viktorovich Shlyapkin (Russian: Алексей Викторович Шляпкин; born 17 August 1987) is a Russian former professional football player.

== Club career ==
He made his Russian Football National League debut for FC Baltika Kaliningrad on 28 March 2009 in a game against FC Chernomorets Novorossiysk.
