= Vadim Khinchagov =

Russian footballer

Personal information
- Full name: Vadim Muratovich Khinchagov
- Date of birth: 30 August 1981 (age 45)
- Height: 1.79 m (5 ft 10 1/2 in)
- Position: Midfielder

Senior career*
Years	Team	Apps	(Gls)
2001–2003	FC Spartak-Alania Vladikavkaz	9	(0)
2004	FC Ekibastuzets	34	(7)
2005	FC Rostov	3	(0)
2006–2008	FC SKA Rostov-on-Don	72	(5)
2009	FC Alania Oktyabrskoye		
2010	FC Sakhalin Yuzhno-Sakhalinsk	29	(7)
2011–2012	FC Mostovik-Primorye Ussuriysk	36	(7)
2012–2013	FC Sakhalin Yuzhno-Sakhalinsk	29	(7)
2015–2016	FC Sakhalin Yuzhno-Sakhalinsk	29	(1)
2016	FC Spartak Vladikavkaz	13	(2)
- * Club domestic league appearances and goals

Vadim Muratovich Khinchagov (Russian: Вадим Муратович Хинчагов; born 30 August 1981) is a Russian former football midfielder.

== Career ==
Previously played for FC Alania Vladikavkaz, FC Ekibastuzets, FC Rostov and SKA Rostov-on-Don. He was called for Kazakhstan national football team for the first time in June 2008, but not played.

On 4 February 2015, Khinchagov resigned for FC Sakhalin Yuzhno-Sakhalinsk.
