= Vyacheslav Chadov =

Russian professional football player

Personal information
- Full name: Vyacheslav Yuryevich Chadov
- Date of birth: 26 September 1986 (age 40)
- Place of birth: Novosibirsk, Russian SFSR
- Height: 1.78 m (5 ft 10 in)
- Position: Forward

Senior career*
Years	Team	Apps	(Gls)
2005	FC Rubin Kazan	0	(0)
2006	FC SKA-Energiya Khabarovsk	4	(0)
2006–2007	FC Chernomorets Novorossiysk	36	(9)
2008	FC Amur Blagoveshchensk	23	(12)
2009	FC Chernomorets Novorossiysk	11	(0)
2010	FC Mostovik-Primorye Ussuriysk	19	(6)
2010–2013	FC Yenisey Krasnoyarsk	68	(10)
2013	FC Salyut Belgorod	19	(1)
2014–2016	FC Yenisey Krasnoyarsk	48	(4)
2016	FC Sibir Novosibirsk	11	(0)
2016–2017	FC Neftekhimik Nizhnekamsk	17	(1)
2017–2018	FC Zenit-Izhevsk	18	(2)
2019	FC Chita	7	(0)
2019–2020	FC TSK Simferopol		
- * Club domestic league appearances and goals

Vyacheslav Yuryevich Chadov (Russian: Вячеслав Юрьевич Чадов; born 26 September 1986) is a Russian former professional football player.

== Career ==
He played 8 seasons in the Russian Football National League for 6 different clubs.

On 4 January 2016, Chadov left FC Yenisey Krasnoyarsk by mutual consent.
