= FC Amur-2010 Blagoveshchensk =

Amur
- Full name: Football Club Amur-2010 Blagoveshchensk
- Founded: 2010
- Dissolved: 2014
- Ground: Amur Stadium
- Capacity: 13,000
- League: Russian Second Division, Zone East
- 2013–14: 4th

FC Amur-2010 Blagoveshchensk (Russian: ФК «Амур-2010» Благовещенск) was a Russian football club from Blagoveshchensk, founded in 2010.

Its predecessor, FC Amur Blagoveshchensk, played on the second-highest level (Soviet First League and Russian First Division). The club was officially dissolved. FC Amur-2010, independent from the old one, was established. It advanced to the Russian Second Division in 2011. In 2014, FC Amur-2010 was also dissolved.
