= FC Sakhalin Yuzhno-Sakhalinsk =

Russian football club

- Full name: Football Club Sakhalin; Футбольный клуб Сахалин
- Founded: 5 May 2004; 22 years ago
- Dissolved: 2024
- Ground: Spartak Stadium, Yuzhno-Sakhalinsk, Russia
- Capacity: 4,052 (2026)
- Chairman: Nikolay Sternichuk
- 2024: Russian Second League, Division B, Group 3; 7th
- Website: https://oneteamsakhalin.com/
Home colours	Away colours	Third colours

Club's former crest

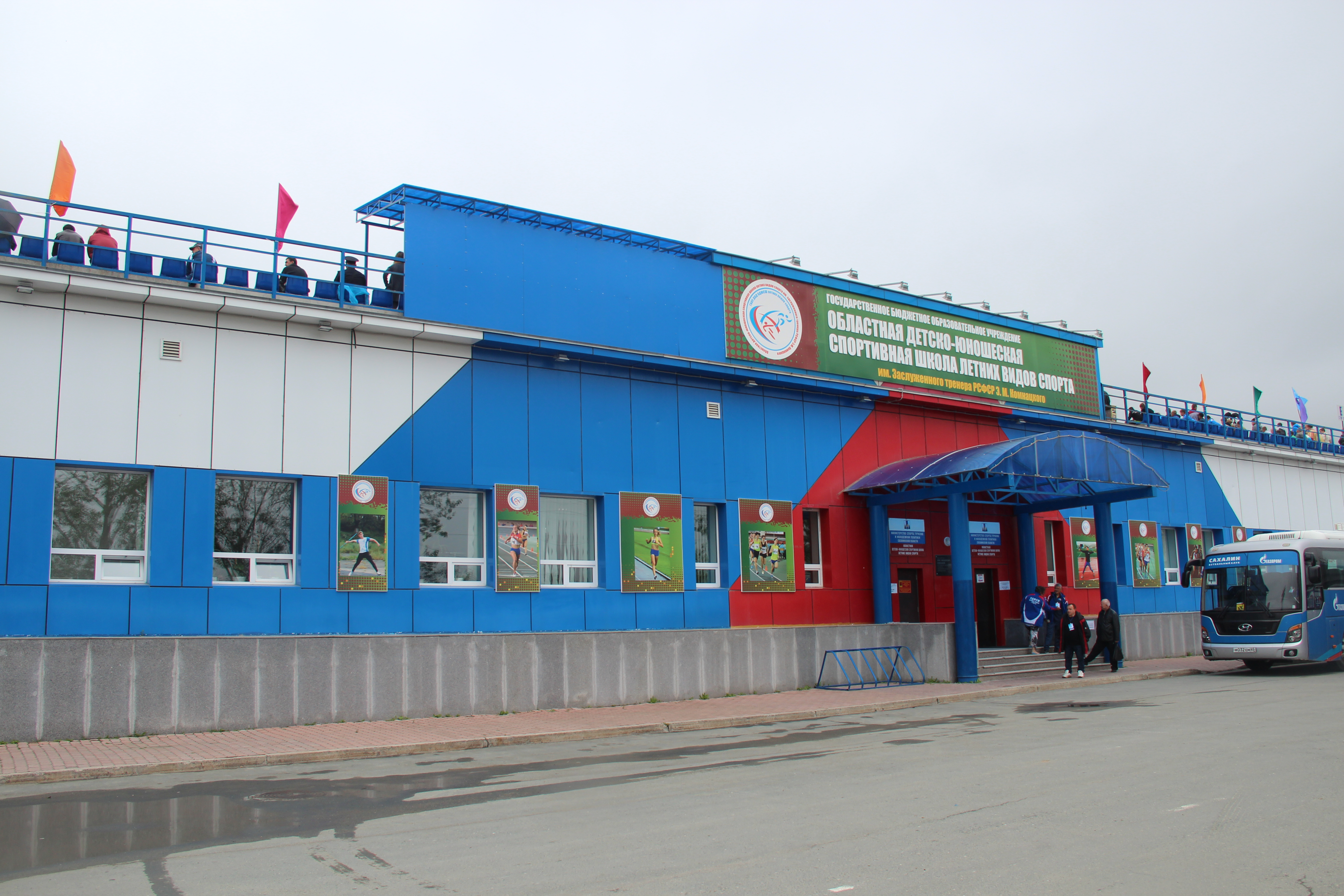
Spartak Stadium in Yuzhno Sakhalinsk

FC Sakhalin Yuzhno-Sakhalinsk (Russian: ФК Сахалин Южно-Сахалинск) was a Russian football club based in Yuzhno-Sakhalinsk, Russia. The club was founded as FC Sakhalin-Tourist Yuzhno-Sakhalinsk in 2004 and changed their name to Sakhalin Yuzhno-Sakhalinsk in 2005.

== History ==
The club won the East zone of the Russian Professional Football League in the 2017–18 season, but did not apply for the license to the second-level Russian National Football League for 2018–19, refusing the promotion due to lack of financing. The same situation repeated in the 2018–19 season.

The club was liquidated at the end of 2024 due to lack of financing.

=== Domestic history ===
Season	League									Russian Cup	Top goalscorer		Manager
Season	Div.	Pos.	Pl.	W	D	L	GS	GA	P	Russian Cup	Name	League	Manager
2010	3rd	5th	30	12	11	7	38	29	47	Fourth round	Maksim Bondarenko	11	
2011–12	3rd	6th	36	15	8	13	40	41	53	Round of 32; Second round	Sergei Vinogradov	18	
2012–13	3rd	4th	30	15	9	6	42	26	54	Third round	Aleksandr Gagloyev; Vadim Khinchagov	7	
2013–14	3rd	1st	24	15	6	3	44	16	51	Second Round	Aleksandr Gagloyev	7	
2014–15	2nd	16th	34	9	8	17	28	50	35	Fourth round	Nikita Satalkin	9	
2015–16	3rd	2nd	24	14	6	4	40	17	48	Round of 32	Aleksandr Gagloyev	12	
2016–17	3rd	3rd	20	8	6	6	30	21	30	Fourth round	Yevgeni Yevstigneyev; Vladimir Mikhalyov; Yuri Pugachyov	5	
2017–18	3rd	1st	20	14	0	6	37	17	42	Third Round	Aleksandr Gagloyev	13	
2018–19	3rd	2nd	20	14	5	1	41	15	47	Round of 32	Aleksandr Gagloyev	15	
2019–20	3rd	2nd	12	5	3	4	16	16	18	Fourth round	Yevgeni Shcherbakov; Yevgeni Matrakhov	3	
2020–21	3rd	16th	30	4	7	19	26	54	19	1/128 Round	Yevgeni Matrakhov; Ibragim Katinovasov	6	
