= List of people from Irkutsk =

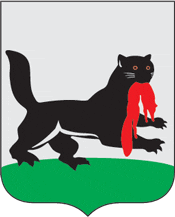
Coat of Arms of Irkutsk

This is a list of notable people who were born or have lived in Irkutsk, Russia.

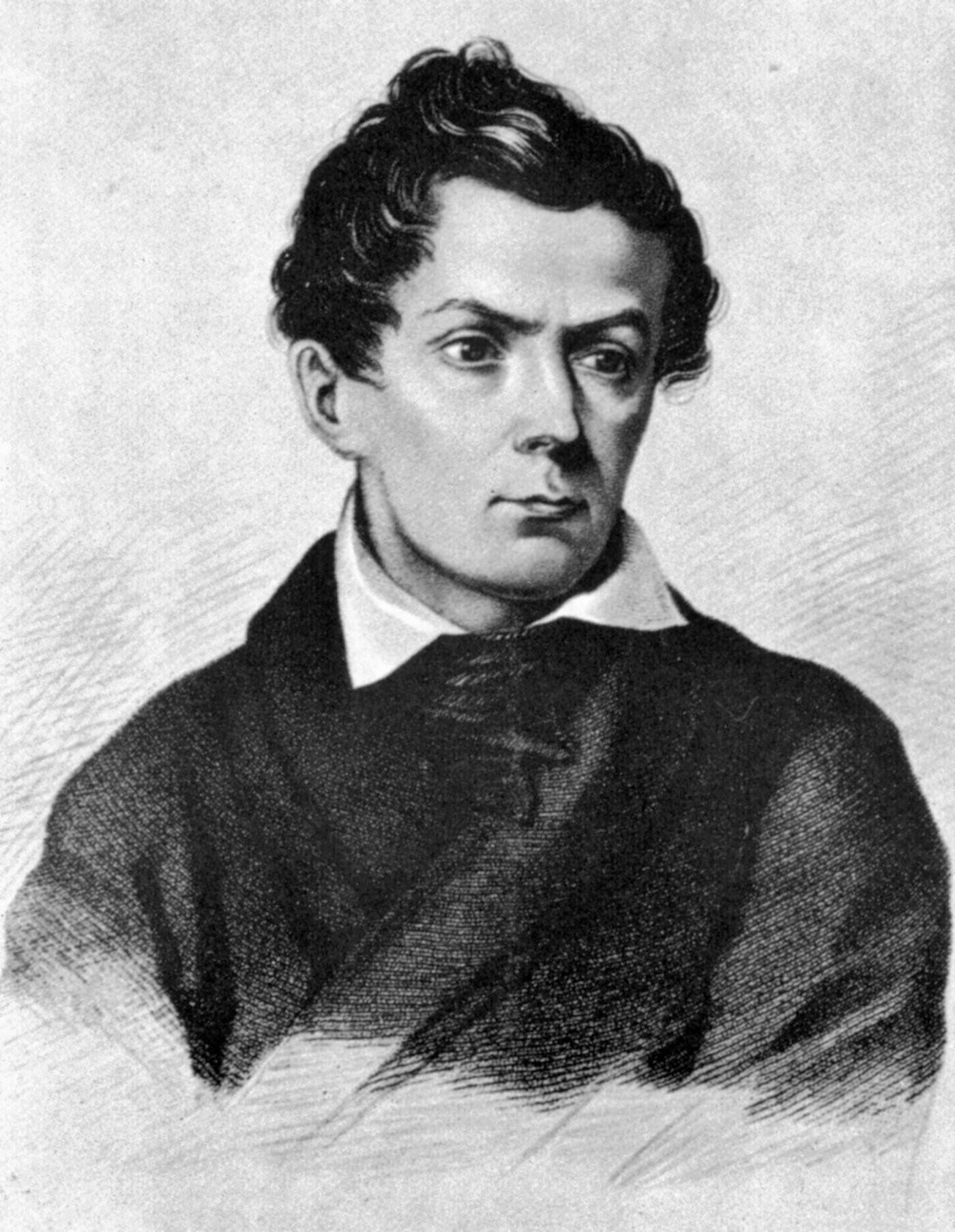
Nikolai Polevoy (1796–1846)

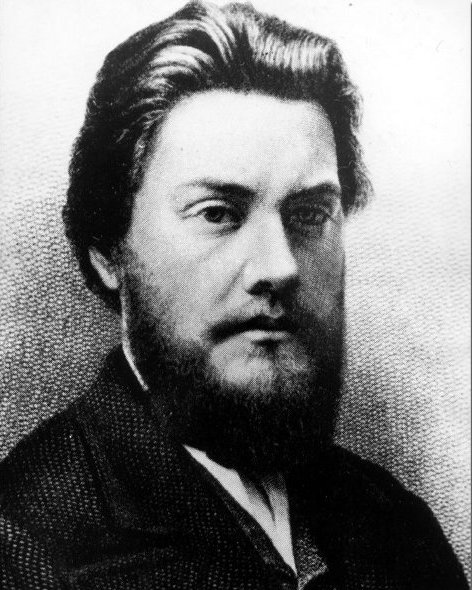
Alexei Pavlovich Fedchenko (1844–1873)

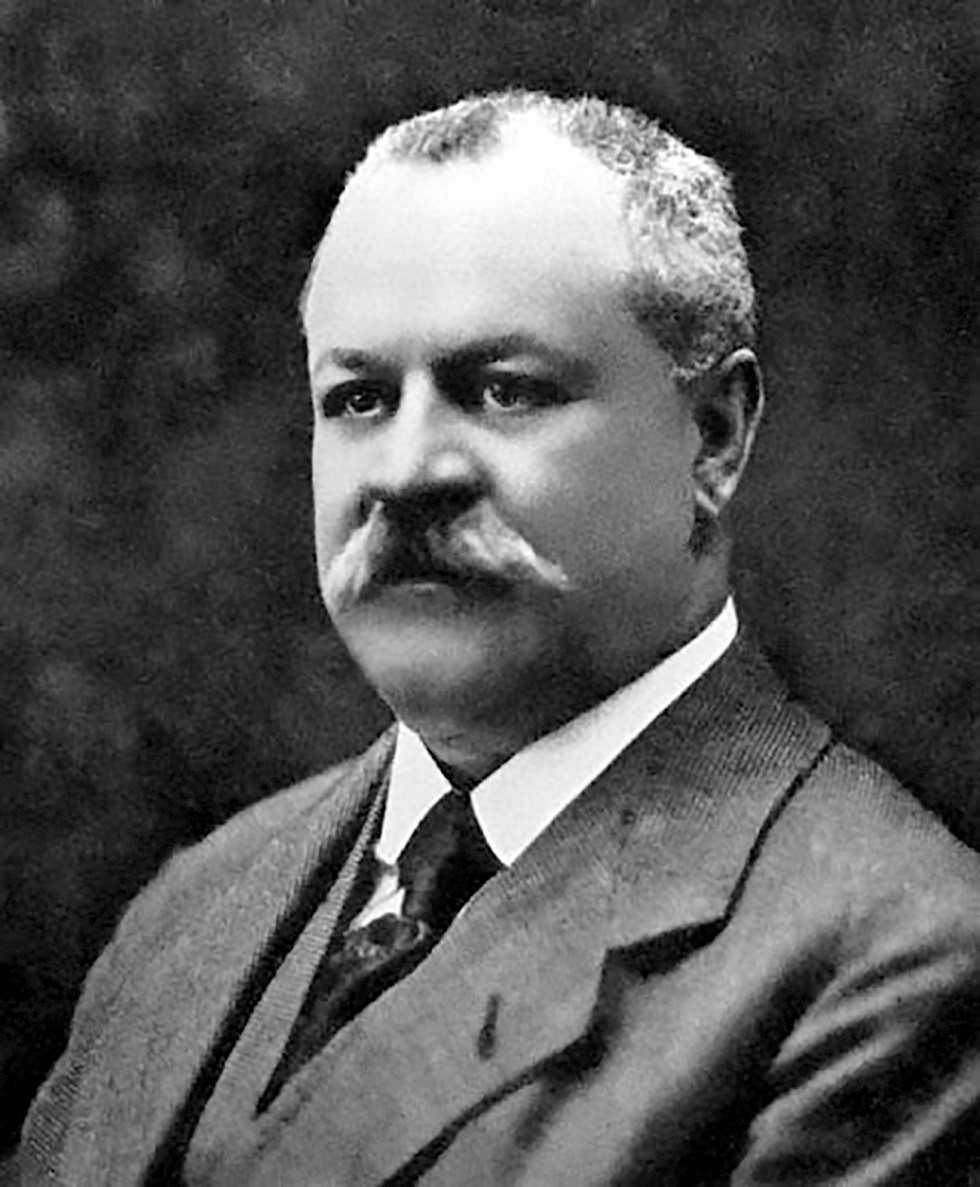
Nikolay Vtorov (1866–1918)

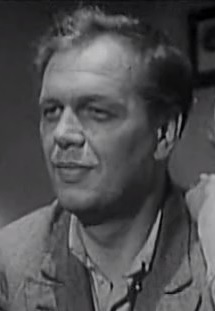
Nikolay Okhlopkov (1900–1967)

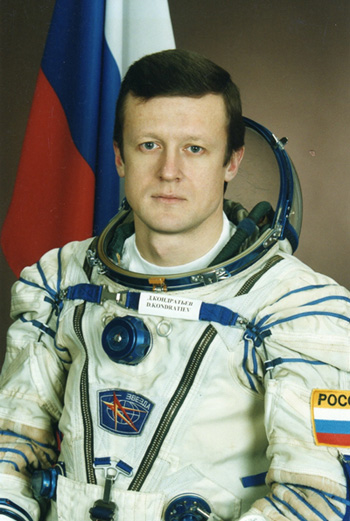
Dmitri Kondratyev (born 1969)

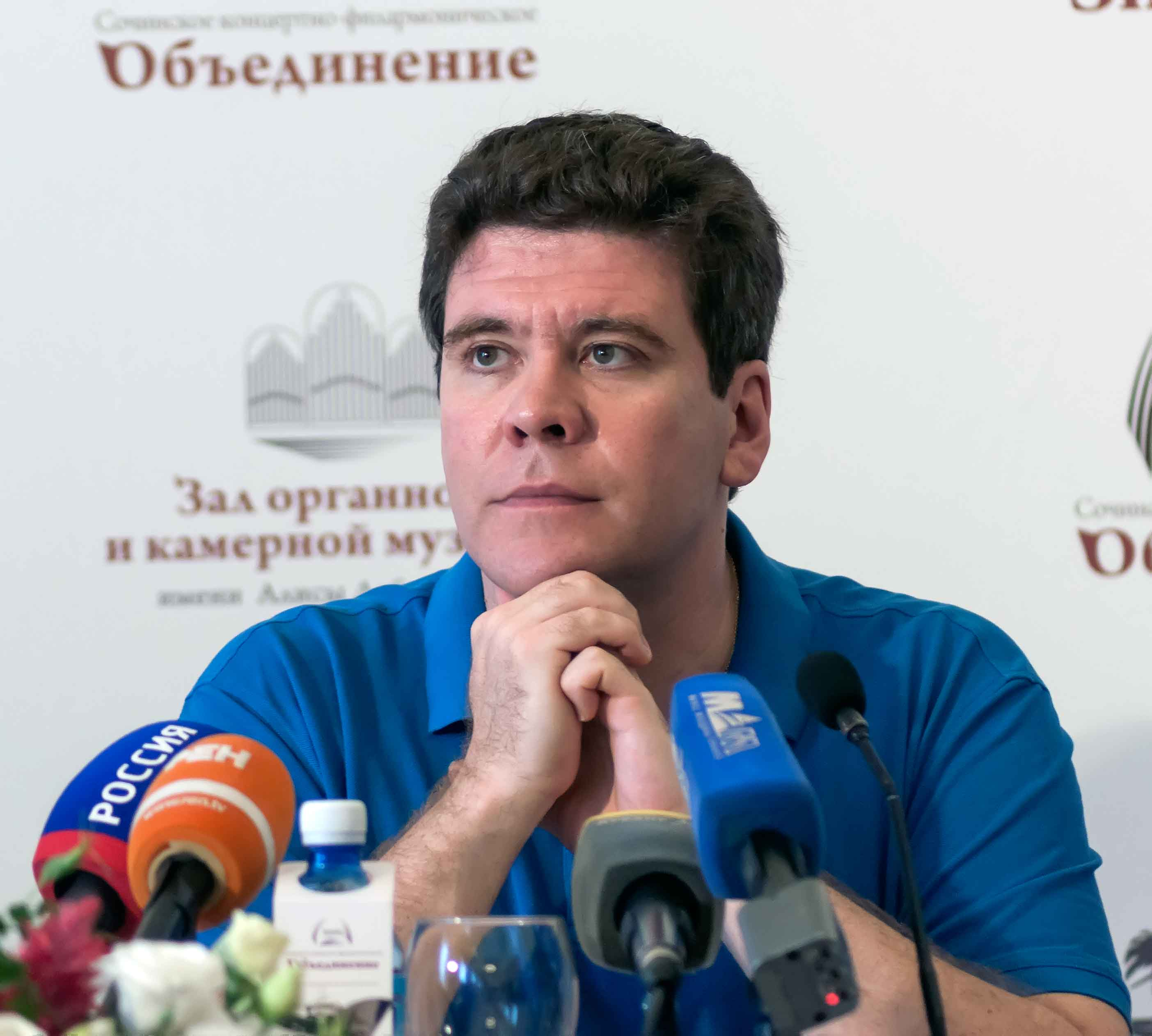
Denis Matsuev (born 1975)

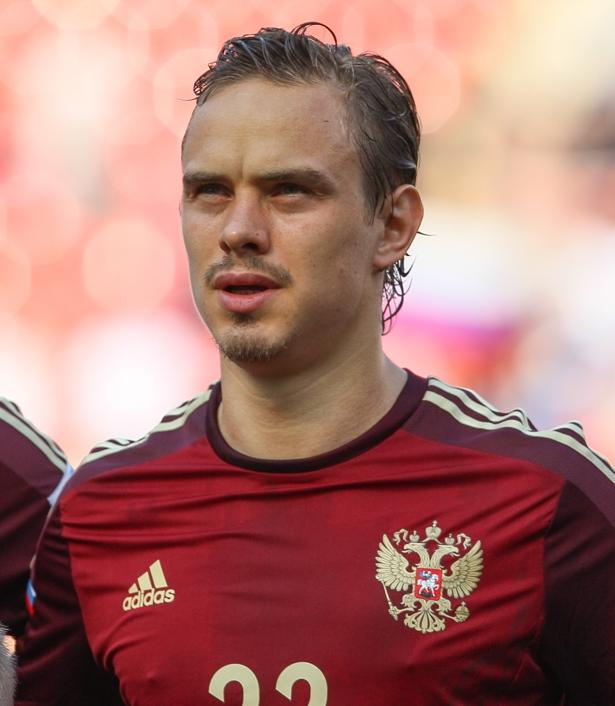
Andrey Yeshchenko (born 1984)

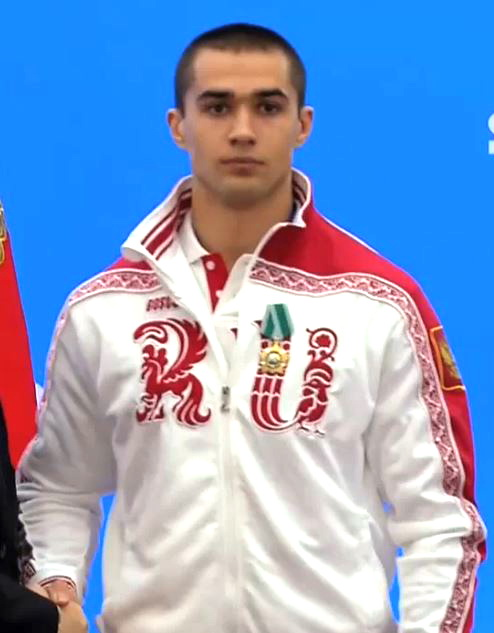
Alexey Negodaylo (born 1989)

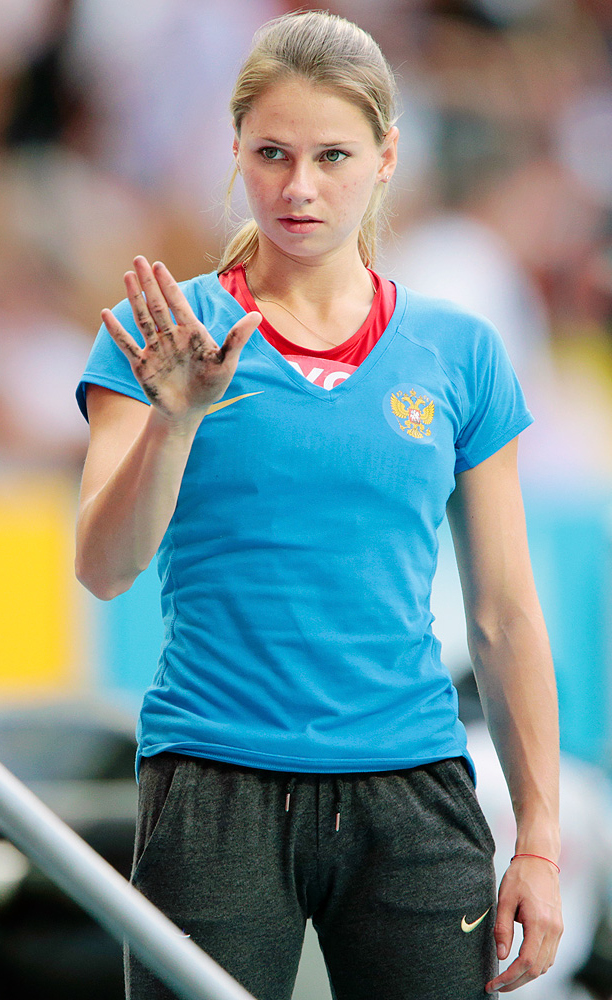
Angelina Zhuk-Krasnova (born 1991)

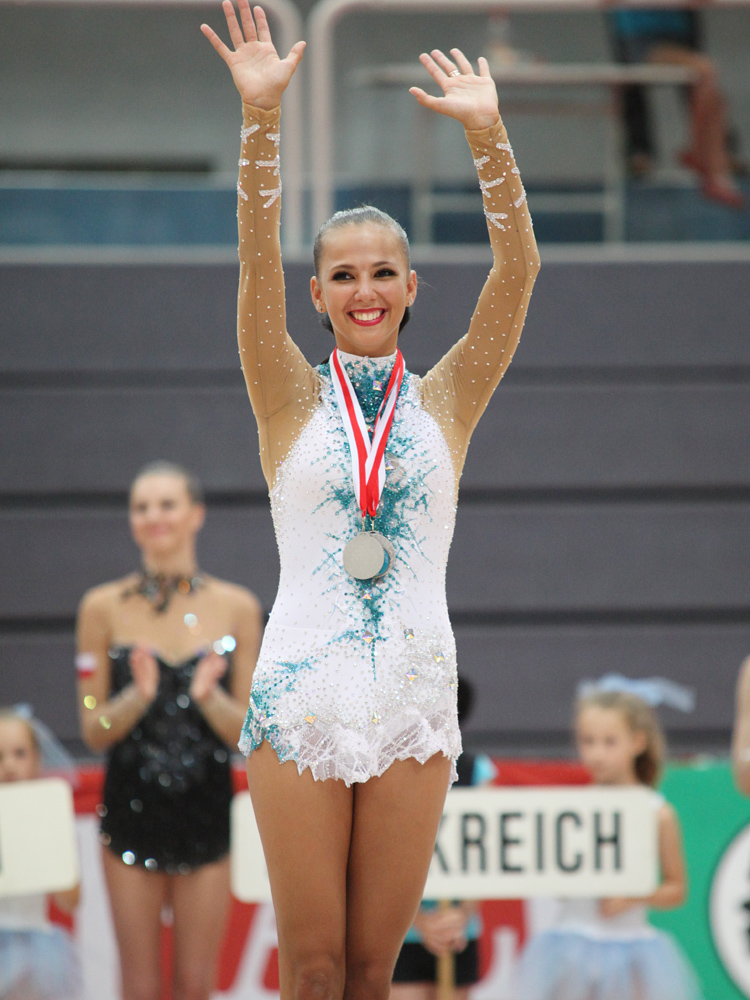
Darya Dmitriyeva (born 1993)

== Born in Irkutsk ==
=== 18th century ===
==== 1701–1800 ====
- Nikolai Polevoy (1796–1846), Russian editor, writer, translator and historian
- Innocent of Alaska (1797-1879), Russian Orthodox priest and bishop in the Americas, Metropolitan of Moscow, recognized as saint in the Orthodox Church

=== 19th century ===
==== 1801–1850 ====
- Ksenofont Polevoy (1801–1867), Russian writer, literary critic, journalist, publisher and translator
- Vladimir Kornilov (1806–1854), Russian naval officer who took part in the Crimean War
- Mikhail Peskov (1834–1864), Russian history and genre painter and lithographer
- Pyotr Gorlov (1839–1915), Russian geologist and engineer
- Alexei Pavlovich Fedchenko (1844–1873), Russian naturalist and explorer
- Alexander Sibiryakov (1849–1933), Russian gold mine and factories owner and explorer of Siberia

==== 1851–1900 ====
- Nikolay Vtorov (1866–1918), Russian industrialist
- Yakov Gakkel (1874–1945), Russian scientist and engineer
- Konkordiya Samoilova (1876–1921), Russian bolshevik
- Nikolai Luzin (1883–1950), Russian mathematician
- Jacques Gershkovitch (1884–1953), Russian conductor and musician
- Mark Azadovsky (1888–1954), Russian scholar of folk-tales and Russian literature
- Alexander I. Pogrebetsky (1891–1952), Russian economist, financier and businessman
- Valéry Inkijinoff (1895–1973), French actor of Russian-Buryat origin
- Sergej Golovčenko (1898–1937), Croatian-Russian caricaturist, comic book author and writer
- Maria Klenova (1898–1976), Russian and Soviet marine geologist
- Nikolay Okhlopkov (1900–1967), Soviet actor and theatre director
- Alexander Shemansky (1900–1976), Russian opera singer (tenor)

=== 20th century ===
==== 1901–1910 ====
- Mikhail Romm (1901–1971), Soviet film director
- Nikolay Kamov (1902–1973), leading constructor of the Soviet-Russian Kamov helicopter design bureau
- Natalya Sats (1903–1993), Russian stage director
- Pavel Nilin (1908–1981), Soviet writer, journalist and playwright
- Mikhail Mil (1909–1970), Soviet aerospace engineer

==== 1911–1920 ====
- Andrei Katkov (1916–1995), Russian Catholic bishop
- Vecheslav Zagonek (1919–1994), Soviet-Russian painter
- Ivan Petrov (1920–2003), Russian bass opera singer

==== 1921–1930 ====
- Lyubow Usava (born 1921), Russian-born Belarusian architect
- Janina Niedźwiecka (1922–2004), Polish film editor
- Pyotr Nikolayev (born 1924), Soviet sports shooter
- Valentin Berlinsky (1925–2008), Russian cellist
- Nikolay Krasilnikov (born 1927), Russian scientist and educator in the fields of image transmission, image compression and human visual system
- Rodislav Chizhikov (1929–2010), Russian cyclist
- Konstantin Vyrupayev (1930–2012), Soviet wrestler and Olympic Champion

==== 1931–1940 ====
- Tamara Novikova (born 1932), Soviet female cyclist
- Anatoliy Samotsvetov (born 1932), Soviet athlete who competed mainly in the hammer throw
- Anatoly Novoseltsev (1933–1995), Russian orientalist
- Boris Volynov (born 1934), Soviet cosmonaut
- Leonid Borodin (1938–2011), Russian novelist and journalist

==== 1941–1950 ====
- Valerii Postoyanov (1941–2018), Soviet sports shooter
- Vyacheslav Trubnikov (born 1944), Russian journalist, political scientist and diplomat

==== 1951–1960 ====
- Olga Buyanova (born 1954), Honored Master of Sports coach in Rhythmic gymnastics of the USSR and Russia
- Andrei Mironov (1954–2014), Russian human rights activist, reporter, fixer, interpreter
- Vasiliy Kulik (1956–1989), Soviet serial killer
- Andrei Semyonov (born 1957), Russian football player
- Sergey Solodovnikov (born 1958), Belarusian professional football coach and Soviet player
- Robertas Dargis (born 1960), President of Lithuanian Confederation of Industrialists
- Aleksandr Krupskiy (born 1960), Russian pole vaulter
- Oleksandr Shlapak (born 1960), Ukrainian politician, bureaucrat, and former Minister of Finance of Ukraine
- Konstantin Volkov (born 1960), Soviet pole vaulter

==== 1961–1970 ====
- Galina Belyayeva (born 1961), Soviet and Russian film and theatre actress
- Dmitry V. Bisikalo (born 1961), Russian astrophysicist
- Alexander Shulgin (born 1964), Russian author and composer
- Sergei Khodakov (born 1966), Russian paralympic athlete competing mainly in category F12 throwing events
- Denis Petushinskiy (born 1967), retired pole vaulter who represented New Zealand after switching from Russia in 1998
- Anatoli Ivanishin (born 1969), Russian cosmonaut
- Dmitri Kondratyev (born 1969), Russian cosmonaut

==== 1971–1980 ====
- Oleg Lidrik (born 1971), Russian professional football official and a former player
- Oxana Kostina (1972–1993), Soviet individual rhythmic gymnast
- Aleksandr Averbukh (born 1974), Israeli Olympic athlete who competed in the pole vault
- Ivan Vyrypaev (born 1974), Russian playwright, screenwriter, film director, actor and art director
- Alexander Bocharov (born 1975), Russian professional road bicycle racer
- Felix Korobov (born 1975), Russian conductor and cellist
- Denis Matsuev (born 1975), Russian classical pianist
- Konstantin Genich (born 1978), Russian professional football player
- Andrey Mishin (born 1979), Russian boxer
- Maria Bruntseva (born 1980), Russian volleyball player
- Rezo Dzhikiya (born 1980), Russian footballer

==== 1981–1990 ====
- Yelena Bolsun (born 1983), Russian female sprint athlete (sprinter)
- Denis Sokolov (born 1983), Russian rifle shooter
- Irina Tkatchuk (born 1983), Russian figure skater
- Olga Zhitova (born 1983), Russian volleyball player
- Anton Lyuboslavskiy (born 1984), Russian shot putter
- Ilya Rashkovsky (born 1984), Russian pianist
- Andrey Yeshchenko (born 1984), professional Russian football player
- Alexander Mayer (born 1986), professional Russian ice hockey player
- Sergei Ogorodnikov (1986–2018), Russian professional ice hockey center
- Maksim Zyuzin (born 1986), Russian professional football player
- Nina Kraviz (born 1987), Russian DJ, producer, and singer
- Olga Kurban (born 1987), Russian heptathlete
- Arman Pashikian (born 1987), Armenian chess Grandmaster
- Dmitri Pytlev (born 1987), Russian professional football player
- Aleksei Yushchuk (born 1987), Russian professional football player
- Vadim Bogdanov (born 1998), Russian football player
- Alexey Negodaylo (born 1989), Russian bobsledder

==== 1991–2000 ====
- Denis Koval (born 1991), Russian speed skater
- Rustam Orujov (born 1991), Azerbaijani judoka
- Mariya Ovechkina (born 1991), Russian beauty contest contestant
- Angelina Zhuk-Krasnova (born 1991), Russian athlete specialising in the pole vault
- Artyom Anoufriev (born 1992), part of a serial killer duo known as the Academy maniacs
- Nikita Lytkin (born 1993), part of a serial killer duo known as the Academy maniacs
- Darya Dmitriyeva (born 1993), Russian rhythmic gymnast
- Maksim Mashnev (born 1993), Russian football midfielder
- Nazí Paikidze (born 1993), Georgian-American chess player
- Ekaterina Vedeneeva (born 1994), Russian-born Slovenian rhythmic gymnast (born in Irkutsk, Russia and currently based in Ljubljana, Slovenia)
- Eduard Bogdanov (born 1994), Russian football player
- Roman Zobnin (born 1994), Russian football midfielder
- Konstantin Drokov (born 1995), Russian ice hockey defenceman
- Alayna Lutkovskaya (born 1996), Russian pole vaulter
- Maksim Mayrovich (born 1996), Russian football player
- Vladimir Tolmachyov (born 1996), Russian football player
- Grigori Trufanov (born 1997), Russian football player
- Veronika Polyakova (born 1999), Russian rhythmic gymnast

== Lived in Irkutsk ==
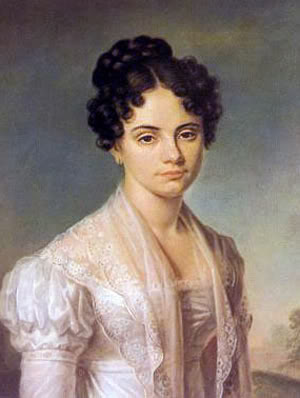
Mariya Volkonskaya (1805–1863)

- Mariya Volkonskaya (1805–1863), youngest daughter of the Russian general Nikolay Raevsky and Sophia Konstantinova, granddaughter of Mikhail Lomonosov. Popularly known in Irkutsk as the Princess of Siberia, she founded a local hospital and opened a concert hall, in addition to hosting musical and cultural soirees in her home.
- Ivan Naumovich Yazev (1895–1955), Soviet astronomer and head of the astronomical observatory at Irkutsk State University
- Rudolf Nureyev (1938–1993), Soviet dancer of ballet and modern dance
- Alitet Nemtushkin (1939–2006), Evenk-Russian poet
- Natalia Lipkovskaya (born 1979), Russian rhythmic gymnast

== See also ==
- List of Russian people
- List of Russian-language poets
