= Semyonov =

Semyonov (masculine), also transliterated as Semenov, Semenoff, and Semionov (Russian: Семёнов), or Semyonova (Semenova, Semionova; feminine) is a common Russian last name. It is derived from the Russian male name Semyon (related to Simeon, Simon) and literally means Semyon's. It is transliterated in Estonian and Latvian as Semjonov.

== Places ==
- Semyonov, Russia, several places in Russia

== People ==
=== Semyonov/a ===
- Alexander Semyonov (disambiguation), several people
- Alexey Semyonov (disambiguation), several people
- Andrey Semyonov (disambiguation), several people
- Arkadiy Semyonov (born 1959), Russian poet
- Grigory Ivanovich Semyonov, former Socialist Revolutionary who became a Bolshevik chekist
- Grigory Mikhaylovich Semyonov, Commander of the White Army, an ataman
- Ivan Semyonov (disambiguation), several people
- Konstantin Semyonov (born 1969), former Soviet Israeli pole vaulter
- Ksenia Semyonova, Russian artistic gymnast
- Marina Semyonova, Russian prima ballerina
- Mikhail Semyonov (disambiguation), several people
- Nikolay Semyonov, Russian/Soviet physicist and chemist
- Semyon Semyonov, Russian KGB case officer
- Svetlana Semyonova, Russian rower
- Valery Semyonov
- Vladimir Semyonov (general) (born 1940), first president of the Karachay-Cherkess Republic, Russia
- Vladimir Semyonov (diplomat), Soviet diplomat and party figure
- Yulian Semyonov, Russian writer of spy fiction
- Yuno Semyonov (1899–1961), Soviet prose writer, playwright and artistic director
- Andrey Semyonov-Tyan-Shansky, Russian/Soviet entomologist and explorer
- Pyotr Semyonov-Tyan-Shansky, Russian geographer and explorer

=== Semenov/a ===
- Aleksandra Semenova (born 1998), Russian rhythmic gymnast
- Ekaterina Semenova (1786-1849), Russian actress
- Lidia Semenova (1951-2025), Ukrainian chess grandmaster
- Oleksiy Semenov (born 1982), Ukrainian discus thrower
- Tatiana Semenova, Russian-American ballet dancer
- Zinaida Semenova (born 1962), Russian long-distance runner
- Andrey Aldan-Semenov, Russian writer and political prisoner

=== Semjonov/a ===
- Uljana Semjonova (1952–2026), Soviet Latvian basketball player

=== Semionov/a ===
- Alexander Semionov, Russian painter
- Polina Semionova, Russian ballet dancer
