= Radio object with continuous optical spectrum =

Group of astronomical objects

Radio Objects with Continuous Optical Spectra, (abbr. ROCOS, also referred to as ROCOSes) is a group of about 80 astrophysical objects characterized by optical spectra anomalously devoid of emission or absorption features, which makes it impossible to determine their distances and locations in relation to our galaxy. They are considered to be a subclass of blazars, and are similar in their spectral characteristics to DC-dwarfs and single stellar-mass black holes.

== Discovery and study ==
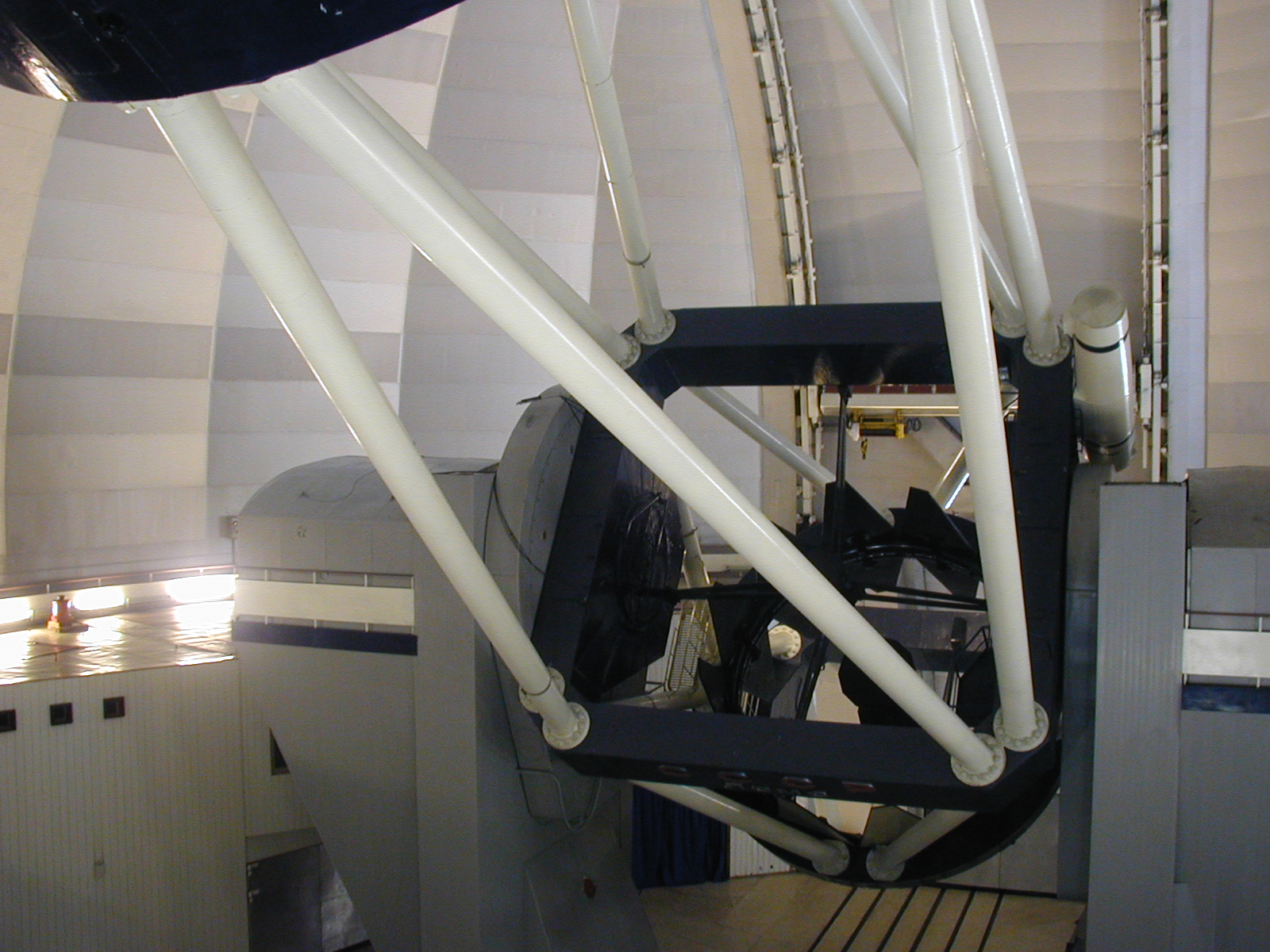
The 6-meter optical telescope at the Special Astrophysical Observatory of the Russian Academy of Science used for studying ROCOSes

Radio Objects with Continuous Optical Spectra, or ROCOSes, were discovered in the 1970s. Among the discoverers was a group of Soviet astrophysicists, who studied them at the Crimean Astrophysical Observatory and the Special Astrophysical Observatory of the Russian Academy of Science, using the former's 2.6-meter optical telescope and the latter's 6-meter optical telescope (BTA-6), along with a 1000-channel photon counter and photometers. The group published their findings in a series of articles in the Russian scientific journals Astronomy Letters and Astronomy Reports.

== Criteria ==
An astronomical radio object is classified as a ROCOS if it possesses (a) an optical image with stellar appearance, which is identified with a radio source, and (b) no emission or absorption features in its optical spectrum, except for those due to galactic interstellar medium, with a signal-to-noise ratio at the level of those observable for quasar candidates. About 8% of the known astronomical radio objects satisfy these two criteria and are considered ROCOSes.

== Properties ==
The absence of distinct emission or absorption lines in the ROCOSes' spectra makes them very similar in this regard to highly polarized quasars (HPQ), BL Lac objects, and single stellar-mass black holes. The absence of optical spectral features also makes it impossible to use red shift for determining their distances or even ascertaining if they are located within or outside our galaxy.
