= Semenoff =

Semenoff is a surname. Notable people with the surname include:

- Gordon Walter Semenoff (born 1953), Canadian theoretical physicist
- Grigory Semenoff (1890–1946), Japanese-supported leader of the White movement in Transbaikal

== See also ==
- Semyonov (disambiguation)
