= Eduard Bogdanov =

Eduard Bogdanov may refer to

- Eduard Bogdanov (footballer, born 1968), Russian footballer
- Eduard Bogdanov (footballer, born 1994), Russian footballer
