= Astronomy Reports =

- Discipline: Astronomy
- Language: English
- Edited by: Dmitry V. Bisikalo

Publication details
- Former name(s): Soviet Astronomy
- History: 1924–present
- Publisher: MAIK Nauka/Interperiodica (Russia)
- Frequency: Monthly
- Impact factor: 0.980 (2020)

Standard abbreviations
- ISO 4: Astron. Rep.

Indexing
- CODEN: ATROES
- ISSN: 1063-7729 (print); 1562-6881 (web)
- LCCN: 93646197
- OCLC no.: 43712703

Links
- Journal homepage

Astronomy Reports (Russian: Астрономический журнал, Astronomicheskii Zhurnal), is a Russian, monthly, peer reviewed, scientific journal. This journal tends to focus its publishing efforts on original research regarding astronomical topics. Other types of reporting are also included such as chronicles, proceedings of international conferences, and book reviews. Founded in 1924, it is described as the most prominent astronomy journal during the age of the Soviet Union. Originally a print version, it is also available online. The editor-in-chief was Alexander A. Boyarchuk, Institute of Astronomy of the Russian Academy of Sciences, Moscow, Russia.

== Former title ==
This journal, currently titled "Astronomy Reports", continues with the same Russian title as when it was known in English as Soviet Astronomy. The former Soviet Astronomy shares exactly the same Russian name as this journal, exactly the same print issn, but the US Library of Congress lists this under a different and unique number in its catalog. Soviet Astronomy ceased publication with volume 36, no. 6 which was published in 1992.

== Translation and distribution ==
Astronomicheskii Zhurnal is translated into English by the International Academic Publishing Company Nauka/Interperiodica (MAIK Nauka/Interperiodica), which is also the official publisher. However, beginning in 2006 access and distribution outside of Russia is through Springer. In addition, the English version of the journal is published simultaneously with its Russian version under the title "Astronomicheskii Zhurnal". From 1999, until present day it has produced 12 issues per year. However, prior to this only six issues were published each year, back to 1996.

== Scope ==
The field of interest for this journal, Astronomy, includes in its scope sub-topics of astronomy. These are stellar astronomy, celestial mechanics, radio astronomy, physics of the Sun, planetary astrophysics, astrophysics theory, and astrophysics science through observation. Also included are methods of astronomy and instrumentation.

== Abstracting and indexing ==
Astronomy Reports is indexed in the following databases:

- Academic OneFile
- Academic Search
- Astrophysics Data System (ADS)
- Chemical Abstracts Service (CAS)
- Current Abstracts
- Current Contents/Physical
- Chemical and Earth Sciences
- Digital Mathematics Registry
- Gale
- Google Scholar
- Inspec
- Journal Citation Reports/Science Edition
- OCLC
- PASCAL
- Science & Technology Collection
- Science Citation Index
- Science Citation Index Expanded (SciSearch)
- SCOPUS
- Simbad Astronomical Database
- Summon by Serial Solutions
- TOC Premier

== See also ==
- Astronomy Letters
