= Drokov =

Drokov (masculine, Russian: Дроков) or Drokova (feminine, Russian: Дрокова) is a Russian surname. Notable people with the surname include:

- Konstantin Drokov (born 1995), Russian ice hockey player
- Maria Drokova (born 1989), Russian investor and venture capitalist
