= Alexander Shulgin (disambiguation) =

Alexander Shulgin (1925–2014) was an American chemist. Alexander Shulgin (Russian: Алекса́ндр Шульги́н) and related names may also refer to:

- Alexander Shulgin (musician) (born 1964), Soviet and Russian musician
- Alexander Shulgin (businessman), a sanctioned Russian businessman
- Oleksander Shulhyn (1889—1960), Ukrainian politician

== See also ==
- Aleksandr Shulginov
