= Aleksei Yushchuk =

Russian footballer

Personal information
- Full name: Aleksei Anatolyevich Yushchuk
- Date of birth: 10 February 1987 (age 39)
- Place of birth: Irkutsk, Russian SFSR
- Height: 1.63 m (5 ft 4 in)
- Position: Midfielder

Team information
- Current team: FC Irkutsk (assistant coach)

Senior career*
Years	Team	Apps	(Gls)
2005–2006	FC Zvezda Irkutsk	1	(0)
2008	FC Zvezda Irkutsk	5	(0)
2009	FC Radian-Baikal Irkutsk (amateur)		
2010–2016	FC Baikal Irkutsk	154	(11)
2016–2020	FC Zenit Irkutsk	62	(6)

Managerial career
- 2024–: FC Irkutsk (assistant)
- * Club domestic league appearances and goals

Aleksei Anatolyevich Yushchuk (Russian: Алексей Анатольевич Ющук; born 10 February 1987) is a Russian professional football coach and a former player. He is an assistant coach with FC Irkutsk.

== Club career ==
He made his Russian Football National League debut for FC Zvezda Irkutsk on 5 September 2008 in a game against FC Torpedo Moscow.
