= Vadim Bogdanov (footballer) =

Russian footballer

Personal information
- Full name: Vadim Sergeyevich Bogdanov
- Date of birth: 16 January 1998 (age 28)
- Place of birth: Irkutsk, Russia
- Height: 1.80 m (5 ft 11 in)
- Positions: Forward; midfielder

Team information
- Current team: FC Irkutsk
- Number: 80

Senior career*
Years	Team	Apps	(Gls)
2014	FC Baikal Irkutsk		
2014–2015	FC Baikal Irkutsk	0	(0)
2016	FC Baikal Irkutsk	9	(0)
2016	FC Rotor Volgograd	0	(0)
2016–2018	FC Zenit Irkutsk	30	(2)
2022–2023	FC Irkutsk (amateur)		
2023–2026	FC Irkutsk	51	(4)
- * Club domestic league appearances and goals as of 5 April 2026

Vadim Sergeyevich Bogdanov (Russian: Вадим Сергеевич Богданов; born 16 January 1998) is a Russian football player.

== Club career ==
He made his debut in the Russian Football National League for FC Baikal Irkutsk on 12 March 2016 in a game against FC Yenisey Krasnoyarsk.
