= Vladimir Tolmachev =

Vladimir Tolmachev or variation may refer to:

- Vladimir Tolmachyov (footballer) (Vladimir Aleksandrievich Tolmachev], born 1996), Russian football player
- Vladimir Tolmachyov (politician) (Vladimir Nikolaevich Tolmachev, 1887–1937), Soviet politician and statesman
