= Dmitry Bisikalo =

Russian astrophysicist

Dmitry V. Bisikalo
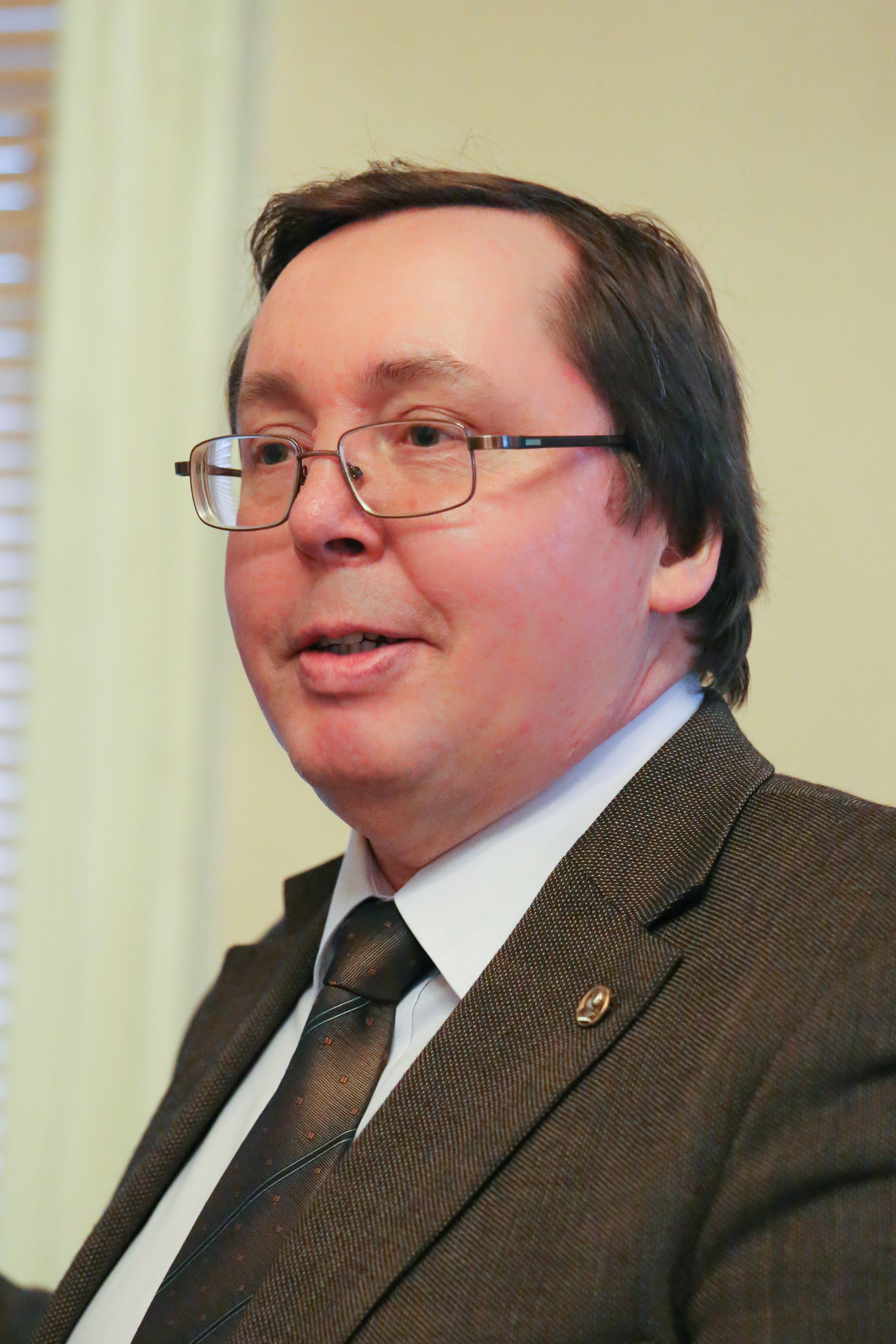
- Born: 3 May 1961 (age 65); Irkutsk, Soviet Union
- Scientific career
- Fields: Astrophysicist
- Workplaces: Institute of Astronomy of the Russian Academy of Sciences

Dmitry Valerevich Bisikalo (Russian: Дмитрий Валерьевич Бисикало; born 1961) is a Russian astrophysicist and an expert in the interaction of binary stars. He is a member of the Russian Academy of Sciences, the IAU, Acting Chief of the Scientific Secretary of the Russian Academy of Sciences and Chief Researcher of the Institute of Astronomy of the Russian Academy of Sciences (RAS).

== Biography ==
Bisikalo was born in 1961 in Irkutsk, then part of the USSR. In 1984 he graduated from the Moscow Institute of Physics and Technology and started his PhD program at the Astronomical Council of the Academy of Sciences of the Soviet Union (now Institute of Astronomy of the Russian Academy of Sciences). In 1988 he defended his PhD thesis (title: Investigation of the Inner Comet Coma in the Frame of Continual and Molecular Gas Dynamics). In 1998 he obtained his Full Doctor degree (Doctor of Sciences) at the Sternberg Astronomical Institute of MSU (title: Investigation of Gas Dynamics of Mass Transfer in Interacting Binary Systems). Since 2001 Bisikalo has been the deputy director of the Institute of Astronomy of RAS (INASAN). In 2010 he was awarded the Professor of Astrophysics and in 2011 he was elected the Correspondent Member of the RAS. Since 2016 Bisikalo has been the Director of the Institute of Astronomy of the Russian Academy of Sciences. Since December 30, 2021 Bisikalo is Acting Chief of the Scientific Secretary of the Russian Academy of Sciences.

== Scientific career ==
Bisikalo is a specialist in the gas dynamics of interacting binary stars and accretion disks. He participates in the development of numerical methods of investigating astrophysical objects by the methods of molecular (solving the kinetic Boltzmann equation) and continual (Euler gas dynamic equations) gas dynamics. He has over 270 published papers, 5 monographs and 4 monographic reviews.

=== Main achievements ===
- Development of the astrophysical direction that combines astrophysical observations with gas dynamical and MHD numerical simulations
- Creation of the self-consistent model of the mass transfer in binary stars
- Investigation of the accretion disk structure in binary stars
- Discovery of precessional density waves in cool accretion disks
- First investigations of the formation of common envelopes in close binary stars
- Description of the outburst activity of classical symbiotic stars based on the results of 3D gas dynamic simulations
- First investigations of the influence of magnetic field on the accretion disk structure in the intermediate polars
- Development of the numerical kinetic model of the interaction of upper planet atmospheres with high-energy particles originating in magnetospheres. The model is widely used in a number of space experiments (IMAGE, HST, MEX, VEX) to investigate the atmospheres of Earth, Venus, Mars, and Jupiter.

The works of D.V. Bisikalo are cited in the annual reports of the RAS.

== Teaching activities ==
Bisikalo works with students and postgraduate students at the Department of Space Physics of the Moscow Institute of Physics and Technology (State University).

== Organizing activities ==
Bisikalo is chief editor of the Russian scientific journal Astronomy Reports, member of the Space Council of the RAS and of the European Astronomical Society, as well as Advisor - Past President of the International Astronomical Union's commission B1 Computational Astrophysics. He actively participates in organizing committees of Russian and international conferences.

== Awards and honors ==
- 1996: Award of the International Academic Publishing Company MAIK "Nauka / Interperiodica" for the best publication in 1996
- 1999: Main award of the International Academic Publishing Company MAIK "Nauka / Interperiodica" for the best publication in 1999
- 2009: Award of the International Academic Publishing Company MAIK "Nauka / Interperiodica" for the best publication in 2009
- 2011: Laureate of AA Belopolsky award (RAS) for the series of works in the field of study of close binary stars
- 2011: Asteroid 269485 Bisikalo, discovered by Russian amateur astronomer Timur Krjačko at the Zelenchukskaya Station in 2009, was named in his honor. The official naming citation was published by the Minor Planet Center on 15 June 2011 (M.P.C. 75354).
- 2012: Medal of the Orden "For Merit II".
- 2022: Medal of the Orden "For Merit I".

== Monographs ==
- D.V. Bisikalo, V.I. Shematovich, P.V. Kaygorodov, A.G. Zhilkin. Gas envelopes of exoplanets - hot Jupiters. Phys. Usp., 2021, Vol. 64, Issue 8.
- D.V. Bisikalo, V.I. Shematovich, P.V. Kaygorodov, A.G. Zhilkin. Gas envelopes of exoplanets - hot Jupiters. Moscow: Nauka, 2020, 252 p. (in Russian).
- D.V. Bisikalo, A.G. Zhilkin, A.A. Boyarchuk. Gaseous dynamic of close binary stars. Moscow: FIZMATLIT, 2013, 632 p. (in Russian).
- A.G. Zhilkin, D.V. Bisikalo, A.A. Boyarchuk. Flow structure in magnetic close binary stars. Phys. Usp., 2012, Vol. 55, pp. 115–136.
- A.M. Fridman, D.V. Bisikalo. The nature of accretion disks of close binary stars: overreflection instability and developed turbulence. Phys. Usp., 2008, Vol. 51, pp. 551–576.
- A.A. Boyarchuk, D.V. Bisikalo, O.A. Kuznetsov, V.M. Chechetkin. Mass Transfer in Close Binary Stars. Advances in Astronomy and Astrophysics Series, Vol. 6, London and New York: Taylor and Francis, 2002, 365 p.
- M.Ya. Marov, V.I. Shematovich, D.V. Bisikalo, J.-C. Gerard. Nonequilibrium processes in the planetary and cometary atmospheres: Theory and Applications. Kluwer Academic Publishers. Dordrecht, 1997, pp. 1–293.
- M.Ya. Marov, V.I.Shematovich, D.V. Bisikalo. Nonequilibrium aeronomic processes. A kinetic approach to the mathematical modeling. Space Science Reviews, 1996, Vol. 76, Nos. 1/2, pp. 1–204.
- M.Ya. Marov, V.I. Shematovich, D.V. Bisikalo. Kinetic modelling of a rarefied gas in astronomy tasks. Moscow: Publ. Keldysh Institute of Applied Mathematics, 1990, pp. 1–250 (in Russian).
