= Ovechkin (surname) =

Ovechkin (Russian: Овечкин, from овечка meaning little sheep) is a Russian masculine surname, its feminine counterpart is Ovechkina. People with the name include:

== People ==
- Alexander Ovechkin (born 1985), Russian professional ice hockey winger
- Artem Ovechkin (born 1986), Russian road bicycle racer
- Mariya Ovechkina (born 1991), Russian beauty pageant contestant
- Nadezhda Ovechkina (born 1958), Russian field hockey player
- Tatyana Ovechkina (born 1950), Russian basketball player
- Valentin Ovechkin (1904–1968), Soviet writer, playwright, and journalist

== Fictional characters ==
- Captain Ovechkin, an antagonist in Keosayan's Elusive Avengers film series who first appeared in The New Adventures of the Elusive Avengers

== See also ==
- The Ovechkin family which hijacked Aeroflot Flight 3739 (1988) in a failed attempt to escape the Soviet Union
- 257261 Ovechkin, an asteroid named for Alexander Ovechkin
