= Andrey Semyonov =

Andrey Semyonov may refer to:

- Andrei Semenov (fighter) (born 1977), Russian mixed martial arts fighter
- Andrey Semyonov-Tyan-Shansky (1866–1942), Russian entomologist and beetle expert
- Andrei Semyonov (footballer, born 1957), Russian football player
- Andrei Semyonov (footballer, born 1989), Russian football player
- Andrei Semyonov (footballer, born 1992), Russian football player
- Andrey Semyonov (sprinter) (born 1977), Russian sprinter, medallist at the 2002 European Athletics Championships

== See also ==
- Semyonov (disambiguation)
