= Dmitri Pytlev =

Russian footballer

Personal information
- Full name: Dmitri Vladimirovich Pytlev
- Date of birth: 15 July 1987 (age 39)
- Place of birth: Irkutsk, Russian SFSR
- Height: 1.80 m (5 ft 11 in)
- Positions: Defender; midfielder

Senior career*
Years	Team	Apps	(Gls)
2005–2008	FC Zvezda Irkutsk	32	(2)
2007	→ FC Sibiryak Bratsk (loan)	19	(1)
2009	FC Metallurg Krasnoyarsk	8	(1)
2010–2015	FC Baikal Irkutsk	139	(9)
2016–2017	FC Neftekhimik Nizhnekamsk	29	(1)
2017–2020	FC Zenit Irkutsk	47	(7)
2021–2023	FC Dynamo Vladivostok	44	(0)
2023–2026	FC Irkutsk	63	(10)
- * Club domestic league appearances and goals as of 31 May 2026

Dmitri Vladimirovich Pytlev (Russian: Дмитрий Владимирович Пытлев; born 15 July 1987) is a Russian professional football player.

== Club career ==
He made his Russian Football National League debut for FC Zvezda Irkutsk on 26 July 2008 in a game against FC Salyut-Energiya Belgorod.
