= Maksim Schastlivtsev =

Russian footballer

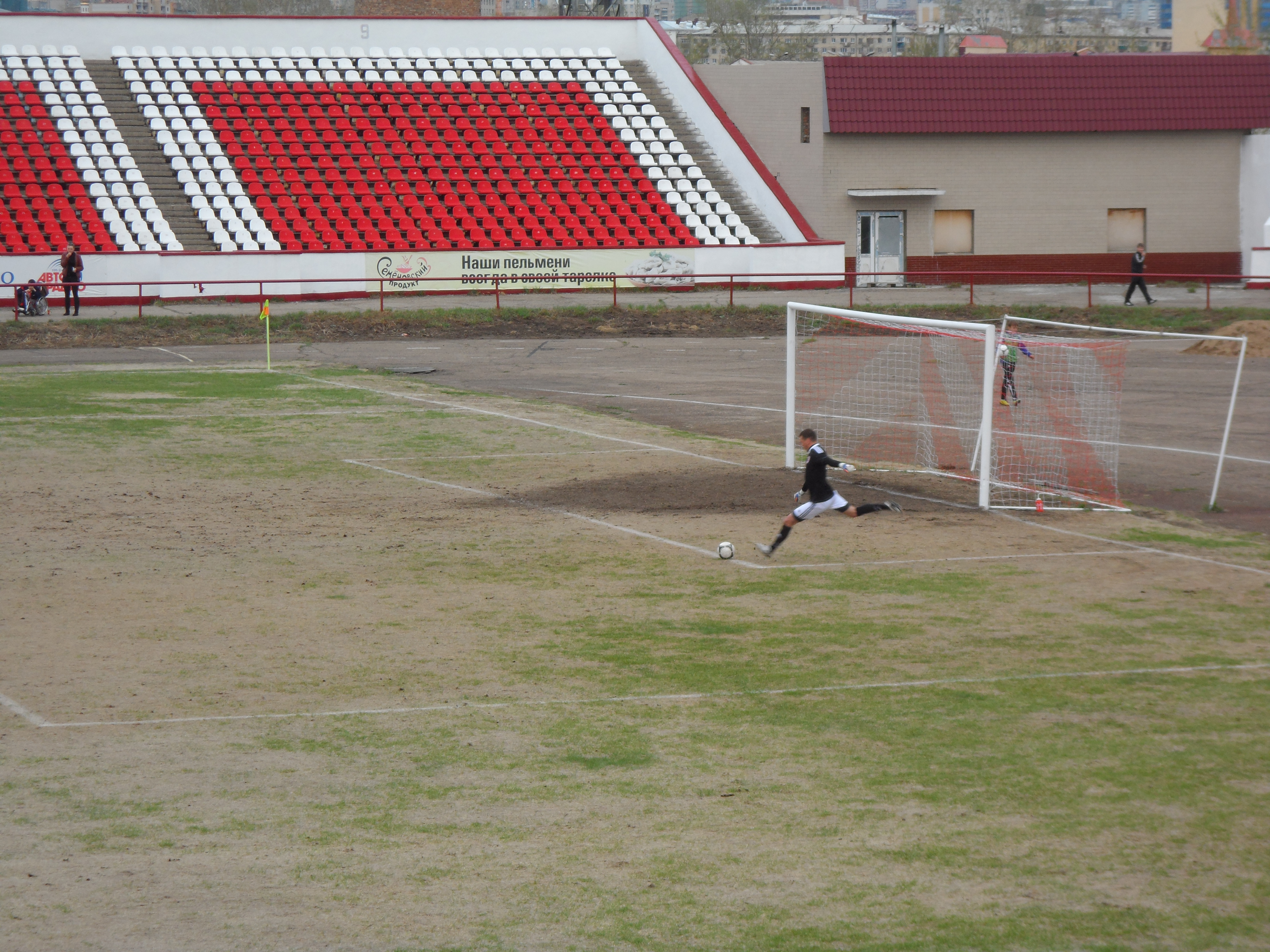

Personal information
- Full name: Maksim Valentinovich Schastlivtsev
- Date of birth: 10 May 1986 (age 40)
- Place of birth: Birobidzhan, Russian SFSR
- Height: 1.90 m (6 ft 3 in)
- Position: Goalkeeper

Senior career*
Years	Team	Apps	(Gls)
2005–2011	FC SKA-Energiya Khabarovsk	6	(0)
2008	→ FC Okean Nakhodka (loan)	25	(0)
2010	→ FC Dynamo Barnaul (loan)	3	(0)
2012–2017	FC Chita	90	(0)
2017–2020	FC Sakhalin Yuzhno-Sakhalinsk	50	(0)
2020	FC Zenit Irkutsk	11	(0)
2021–2022	FC Chita	17	(0)
- * Club domestic league appearances and goals

Maksim Valentinovich Schastlivtsev (Russian: Максим Валентинович Счастливцев; born 10 May 1986) is a Russian former professional football player.

== Club career ==
He made his Russian Football National League debut for FC SKA-Energiya Khabarovsk on 5 May 2006 in a game against FC Angusht Nazran.
