= Alexander Semyonov =

Alexander Semyonov may refer to:

- Aleksandr Alekseyevich Semyonov (born 1983), Russian footballer with FC Dynamo Kostroma
- Aleksandr Sergeyevich Semyonov (born 1982), Russian footballer with FC Neman Grodno
- Alexander Semionov (1922–1984), Soviet painter

== See also ==
- Semyonov (disambiguation)
