= Ivan Semyonov =

Ivan Semyonov can refer to:

- Ivan Semyonov (athlete) (1924-1966), Soviet athlete
- Ivan Semyonov (equestrian) (born 1936), Soviet equestrian
- Ivan Semyonov (footballer) (born 1988), Russian footballer
