= Alexandr Boyarchuk =

Russian astronomer and physicist

- Александр Алексеевич Боярчук
- Born: 21 June 1931; Grozny, Soviet Union
- Died: 10 August 2015 (aged 84); Moscow, Russia
- Education: Saint Petersburg State University
- Known for: President of International Astronomical Union from 1991 to 1994
- Awards: USSR State Prize; Order of Honour; Order of the Badge of Honour; Order "For Merit to the Fatherland" III class; Order "For Merit to the Fatherland" IV class; F. Bredikhin Award; The A. A. Belopolsky Prize
- Scientific career
- Fields: Astronomy; Physics
- Workplaces: Institute of Astronomy of the Russian Academy of Sciences

Alexandr Boyarchuk (June 21, 1931 – August 10, 2015) was a Russian physicist and astronomer.

== Life ==
In 1953, he graduated from Leningrad University. After graduation, he worked at the Crimean Astrophysical Observatory, which was under direction of the USSR Academy of Sciences at the time. Later, he was elected a corresponding member of the same organization, and worked as an academician there until 1987. From 1987 to 2003, he was the director of the Institute of Astronomy of the Russian Academy of Sciences. From 1991 to 1993, he was also President of the International Astronomical Union.

== Scientific achievements ==
Boyarchuk specialized in studying the physics of stars. He carried out numerous studies regarding the chemical composition of stars of various classes, in particular, he discovered an excess of helium in Beta Lyrae. Boyarchuk also studied the motion of stellar atmospheres, as well as the rotation of stars. He devoted a number of his works to non-stationary stars. He was the developer of a model of symbiotic stars. Based on this model, he obtained estimates of the mass, size, temperature and other characteristics of these objects. Together with E.R. Mustel, he proposed a model for the envelope of new stars. Under the leadership of Boyarchuk, the ultraviolet telescope Astron was created.

== Death ==
Boyarchuk died on August 10, 2015, at the age of 84 in Moscow.
