= Vladimir Tolmachyov (footballer) =

Russian footballer

Personal information
- Full name: Vladimir Aleksandrovich Tolmachyov
- Date of birth: 22 May 1996 (age 30)
- Place of birth: Irkutsk, Russia
- Height: 1.74 m (5 ft 9 in)
- Position: Midfielder

Senior career*
Years	Team	Apps	(Gls)
2014	FC Baikal-M Irkutsk		
2016	FC Baikal Irkutsk	14	(0)
2016–2020	FC Zenit Irkutsk	69	(1)
2021	FC Mashuk-KMV Pyatigorsk	9	(0)
2021–2022	FC Sakhalin Yuzhno-Sakhalinsk	19	(0)
2023–2025	FC Irkutsk	45	(0)
- * Club domestic league appearances and goals as of 2 November 2025

Vladimir Aleksandrovich Tolmachyov (Russian: Владимир Александрович Толмачёв; born 22 May 1996) is a Russian football player.

== Club career ==
He made his debut in the Russian Football National League for FC Baikal Irkutsk on 12 March 2016 in a game against FC Yenisey Krasnoyarsk.
