= Alexey Semyonov =

Alexey Semyonov may refer to:

- Alexey Semyonov (footballer, born 1949) (Alexey Alexandrovich Semyonov), Russian association football player and coach
- Alexei Semenov (mathematician) (born 1950), Russian scientist-mathematician, academician of the Russian Academy of Sciences
- Aleksey Semyonov (Uzbekistani footballer) (born 1968), Uzbekistan football defender
- Alexei Semenov (ice hockey) (born 1981), Russian ice hockey defenceman
- Aleksei Semyonov (footballer, born 1983) (Aleksei Vladimirovich Semyonov), Russian association football player
- Alexei Semyonov (ice hockey) (born 1986), Russian ice hockey goaltender

== See also ==
- Semyonov (disambiguation)
