= Yekaterina Avdeyeva =

Russian writer (1788–1865)

Yekaterina Alekseyevna Avdeyeva
- Екатерина Алексеевна Авдеева
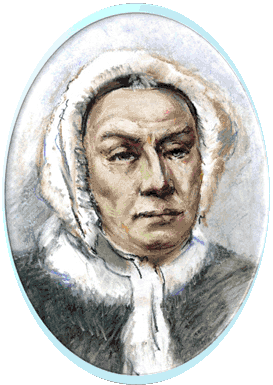
- Born: Yekaterina Alekseyevna Polevaya; 16 August [O.S. 5 August] 1788; Kursk, Russian Empire
- Died: 21 July [O.S. 2 August] 1865 (aged 76); Dorpt, Russian Empire
- Occupation: Writer

Yekaterina Alekseyevna Avdeyeva (Russian: Екатерина Алексеевна Авдеева; née Polevaya [Полевая]; 1788–1865) was a Russian writer, known especially for her books on homemaking and collections of Russian folk tales. She was a sister of Nikolai Polevoy and Ksenofont Polevoy. In 1837 she published a book called Notes and remarks about Siberia.

== Sources ==
- "Полевая, Екатерина Алексеевна" . Brockhaus and Efron Encyclopedic Dictionary (in Russian). 1906.
