= Nikolai Polevoy =

Russian editor, writer, translator, and historian

- Никола́й Алексе́евич Полево́й
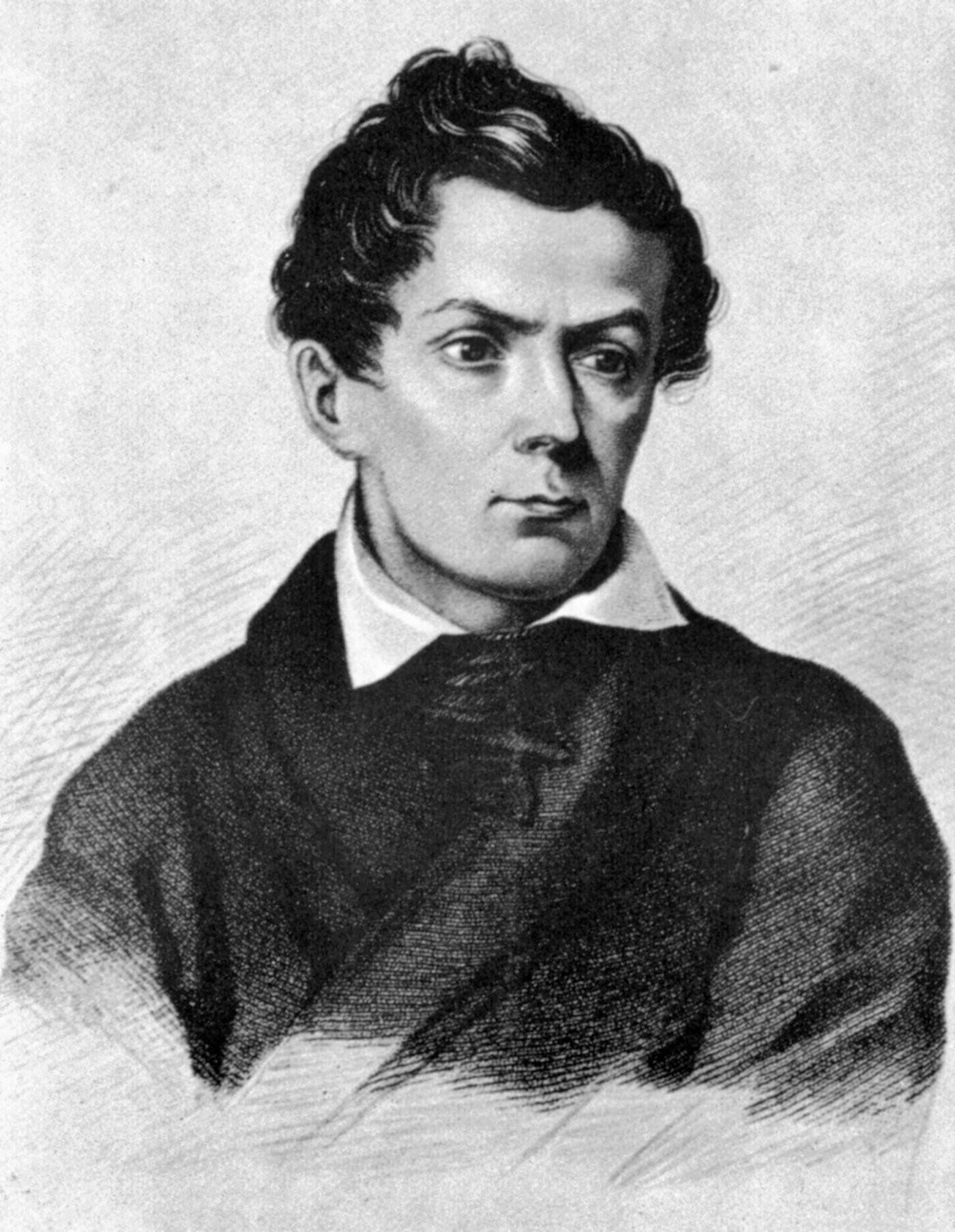
- Born: Nikolai Polevoy; 3 July 1796; Irkutsk, Russia
- Died: 6 March 1846 (aged 49); Saint Peterburg, Russia
- Resting place: Literatorskiye Mostki, Saint Petersburg
- Relatives: Ksenofont Polevoy (brother)
- Writing career
- Pen name: Ivan Balakirev
- Subjects: Novelist; playwright; critic; journalist; historian

Nikolai Alekseevich Polevoy (Russian: Никола́й Алексе́евич Полево́й, romanized: Nikoláy Alekséevich Polevóy, 3 July [O.S. 22 June] 1796 ― 6 March [O.S. 22 February] 1846) was a controversial Russian editor, writer, translator, and historian; his brother was the critic and journalist Ksenofont Polevoy and his sister the writer and publisher of folktales Ekaterina Avdeeva.

== Biography ==
Polevoy was from an old merchant family from Kursk but was born in Irkutsk, where his father was director of a Russian-American company, and lived there until 1811, when the family moved first to Moscow and then to Kursk. His father, disappointed in his refusal to take up the family business and disapproving of his interest in literature and history, refused to pay for his education, so he taught himself.

In February 1820, he moved to Moscow, where he attended both the theatre and lectures at Moscow University; he visited Saint Petersburg and met Alexander Griboyedov, Vasily Zhukovsky, Faddei Bulgarin, and other literary figures, and began a literary career, publishing articles, poems, and translations in the journals of the day.

In 1825, he started his own journal, Moskovskii telegraf (The Moscow Telegraph), hoping to attract the writers he admired, like Pushkin, as well as emphasize the positive contributions of the merchant class to Russia. Unfortunately, the aristocrats of the Pushkin circle viewed him as a vulgar parvenu, and his attack on Karamzin's reactionary History of the Russian State offended many influential people, notably Pyotr Vyazemsky, who had been Karamzin's ward and whose sister was married to the older historian.

When Polevoy wrote his own six-volume History of the Russian People (1829–1833), it was savaged by almost everyone. The brilliant and idiosyncratic critic Apollon Grigoryev wrote in his memoirs, "From our present [1864] point of view it would be impossible to conceive anything more indecent than the article that the editor of the Moscow Herald [i.e., Mikhail Pogodin] hurled against The History of the Russian People, if the articles [by Nikolai Nadezhdin] against it in the old men's European Herald had not been even more indecent... The factions do not seem to have been in their right minds thirty years ago. What was the cause of their being so hostile that they foamed at the mouth?"

Polevoy emphasized that history followed laws and did not depend on the actions of particular individuals; he was also one of the first to present Russian history as a confrontation between Europe and Asia.

In Russian Romantic Criticism: An Anthology, Lauren G. Leighton says, summing up the contributions of Nikolai and his brother and collaborator Ksenofont:

No one should argue that the Polevoys were comparable in literary taste and talent to the aristocrats of the Pushkin pleiad; their self-educated, self-made characters are apparent in their journal. But neither should they be denied their great contribution in making leading European thinkers available to the Russian public in Russian, their eminently human liberalism, or their courage in constantly testing—and outwitting—the government censor. In 1834, after competition from both the aristocrats and the plebeians had laid waste to the Polevoys' finances, The Moscow Telegraph was closed down by the government. The Polevoys spent most of the rest of their lives editing the journals of Bulgarin and Grech.

The journal was closed down because of a bad review it gave a play by Nestor Kukolnik; Bernard Pares tells the story:

It must be understood that the vast distances and the thinness of population in Russia practically confined journalistic enterprise to St. Petersburg and Moscow. Even the Moscow journalists were hampered, in comparison with those of St. Petersburg, because it took them longer to guess in which direction the wind of the moment was blowing. Thus, in 1834, Polevóy, who had severely reviewed a patriotic play, found, on his arrival in St. Petersburg, that it had pleased the upper society. "What are you doing?" said his protector, the Administrator of Police; "you see how they take the play here; you will have to agree with this opinion, or else you will get yourself into terrible trouble."

D.S. Mirsky writes, "But his memory after his death was deservedly reverenced by the new intelligentsia as that of a pioneer and, in a sense, a martyr."

== Cultural references ==
Nikolay Polevoy is the main hero of "Izlomanny Arshin" ("Broken Arshin") novel by Samuil Lurie.
