= Semyonov, Russia =

Semyonov (Russian: Семёнов) is the name of several inhabited localities in Russia.

Urban localities

- Semyonov, Nizhny Novgorod Oblast, a town in Nizhny Novgorod Oblast

Rural localities

- Semyonov, Krasnodar Krai, a khutor in Bratsky Rural Okrug of Ust-Labinsky District of Krasnodar Krai
- Semyonov, Koverninsky District, Nizhny Novgorod Oblast, a pochinok in Bolshemostovsky Selsoviet of Koverninsky District of Nizhny Novgorod Oblast
- Semyonov, Volgograd Oblast, a khutor in Tormosinovsky Selsoviet of Chernyshkovsky District of Volgograd Oblast
- Semyonov, Voronezh Oblast, a khutor in Skupopotudanskoye Rural Settlement of Nizhnedevitsky District of Voronezh Oblast
