= Mikhail Semyonov =

Mikhail Semyonov or Semenov may refer to:

- Michail Semenov (b.1986), Belarusian cross-country skier
- Mikhail Semyonov (basketball) (1933-2006), Russian basketball player
- Mikhail Semyonov (footballer) (b. 1969), Russian football player and coach
- Mikhail Semyonov (politician) (1938-2019), Russian politician

== See also ==
- Mikhail Siamionau (b. 1984), Belarusian wrestler
