= Ivan Semyonov (footballer) =

Russian footballer

Personal information
- Full name: Ivan Vladimirovich Semyonov
- Date of birth: 9 July 1988 (age 38)
- Place of birth: Kamensk-Shakhtinsky, Rostov Oblast, Russian SFSR
- Height: 1.78 m (5 ft 10 in)
- Position: Midfielder

Youth career
- FC Progress Kamensk-Shakhtinsky

Senior career*
Years	Team	Apps	(Gls)
2006	FC Nosta Novotroitsk	0	(0)
2006	FC Tyumen	14	(1)
2007	FC Nosta Novotroitsk	8	(1)
2008	FC Tyumen	30	(4)
2009	FC Nosta Novotroitsk	24	(2)
2010	FC Torpedo-ZIL Moscow	30	(2)
2011	FC Torpedo Vladimir	21	(0)
2012	FC Ufa	0	(0)
2015	FC GNS-Spartak Krasnodar		
2015	FC Afips Afipsky	6	(1)
- * Club domestic league appearances and goals

Ivan Vladimirovich Semyonov (Russian: Иван Владимирович Семёнов; born 9 July 1988) is a former Russian professional football player.

== Club career ==
He played 3 seasons in the Russian Football National League for FC Nosta Novotroitsk and FC Torpedo Vladimir.
