= Ksenofont Polevoy =

Russian writer and translator (1801–1867)

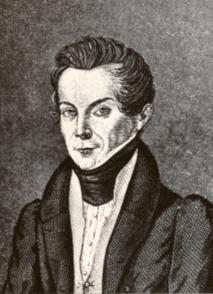
- Born: Ксенофонт Алексеевич Полевой; 1 August 1801; Irkutsk, Russia
- Died: 21 April 1867 (aged 65); Tyukhmenevo, Smolensk Governorate, Russia
- Occupations: Writer; literary critic; journalist; publisher; translator

Ksenofont Alexeyevich Polevoy (Russian: Ксенофонт Алексеевич Полевой; 1 August 1801 – 21 April 1867) was a Russian writer, literary critic, journalist, publisher and translator. He was the younger brother of the writers Yekaterina Avdeyeva and Nikolai Polevoy.

Among the biographies Ksenofont Polevoy authored were those of Mikhail Lomonosov (1836, praised by Vissarion Belinsky) and Ivan Khemnitser (1838), as well as his brother, whom he idolized (The Notes on the Life and Works by Nikolai Polevoy, 1888).

In 1835–1839, he translated from French the 16 volumes of Memoires ou souvenirs historiques (1831) by Laure Junot. In 1825–1834, he co-edited (with Nikolai Polevoy) Moskovsky Telegraf, in 1835–1838 Zhivopisnoe obozrenie, then a yearly almanac.

== Sources ==
- "Полевой, Ксенофонт Алексеевич" . Brockhaus and Efron Encyclopedic Dictionary (in Russian). 1906.
