= Alexander Shemansky =

Russian opera singer

External image
- Alexander Shemansky as Canio in the opera "Pagliacci". Russian opera at the Railway Assembly. Harbin, 1920's.

Alexander Leonidovich Shemansky (Russian: Александр Леонидович Шеманский; 11 May 1900, Irkutsk — 1 April 1976, Los Angeles) was a Russian opera singer (tenor).

He studied at the Irkutsk Cadet Corps; in the Civil War he served as a second lieutenant in the Russian Far East. He emigrated to Harbin, studied singing at the Osipova-Zarzhevskoy. In exile, he was a soloist at the Opera Harbin Railway Assembly, toured with the Italian Opera Company "Capri" in Asian countries. In Harbin, in 1936, played a concert together with Feodor Chaliapin. In the 1960s he moved to the United States, where he taught singing in Los Angeles.
