= Aleksandr Semyonov (footballer, born 1983) =

Russian footballer

Personal information
- Full name: Aleksandr Alekseyevich Semyonov
- Date of birth: 9 May 1983 (age 43)
- Place of birth: Novy Svet, Russian SFSR
- Height: 1.83 m (6 ft 0 in)
- Position: Goalkeeper

Senior career*
Years	Team	Apps	(Gls)
2001	FC Oazis Yartsevo	19	(0)
2002–2003	FC Kristall Smolensk	12	(0)
2004–2005	FC Petrotrest St. Petersburg	32	(0)
2005	FC Spartak Kostroma	15	(0)
2007	FC Smolensk	27	(0)
2008	FC Dnepr Smolensk (D4)		
2008	FC Spartak-2 Kostroma (D4)		
2008	FC Spartak Kostroma	3	(0)
2009	FC Dynamo Kostroma (D4)		
2010	FC Dynamo Kostroma	17	(0)
2013	FC Dnepr Smolensk	0	(0)
- * Club domestic league appearances and goals

Aleksandr Alekseyevich Semyonov (Russian: Александр Алексеевич Семёнов; born 9 May 1983) is a former Russian professional football player.

== Club career ==
He played two seasons in the Russian Football National League for FC Kristall Smolensk and FC Petrotrest St. Petersburg.
