= Astronomy Letters =

- Discipline: Astronomy, astrophysics
- Language: English
- Edited by: Rashid A. Sunyaev

Publication details
- History: 1994–present
- Publisher: MAIK Nauka/Interperiodica (Russia)
- Frequency: Monthly
- Impact factor: 1.075 (2018)

Standard abbreviations
- ISO 4: Astron. Lett.

Indexing
- ISSN: 1063-7737 (print); 1562-6873 (web)
- LCCN: 94646556
- OCLC no.: 43712597

Links
- Journal homepage; Online access

Astronomy Letters (Russian: Pis’ma v Astronomicheskii Zhurnal) is a Russian peer-reviewed scientific journal. The journal covers research on all aspects of astronomy and astrophysics, including high energy astrophysics, cosmology, space astronomy, theoretical astrophysics, radio astronomy, extra galactic astronomy, stellar astronomy, and investigation of the Solar System.

Pis’ma v Astronomicheskii Zhurnal is translated in its English version by MAIK Nauka/Interperiodica, which is also the official publisher. However, beginning in 2006 access and distribution outside of Russia is made through Springer Science+Business Media. Both English and Russian versions are published simultaneously.

Astronomy Letters was established in 1994 and published bimonthly. From 1999, it has been published monthly. The editor-in-chief is Rashid A. Sunyaev (Space Research Institute).

== Abstracting and indexing ==
Astronomy Letters is abstracted and indexed in:

- Academic OneFile
- Academic Search
- Astrophysics Data System
- Chemical Abstracts Service
- Current Contents/Physical, Chemical and Earth Sciences
- Inspec
- EBSCO/Science & Technology Collection
- Science Citation Index
- Scopus
- Simbad Astronomical Database
- TOC Premier

According to the Journal Citation Reports, the journal has a 2018 impact factor of 1.075.

== See also ==
- Astronomy Reports
