= Pyotr Gorlov =

Imperial Russian engineer

Pyotr Nikolayevich Gorlov
- Пётр Никола́евич Го́рлов
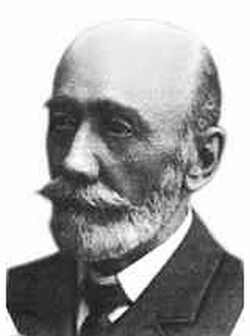
- Born: May 11, 1839; Irkutsk, Irkutsk Governorate, Russian Empire
- Died: November 20, 1915 (aged 76)
- Occupations: Geologist, engineer
- Known for: Exploring coal deposits in the Russian Empire

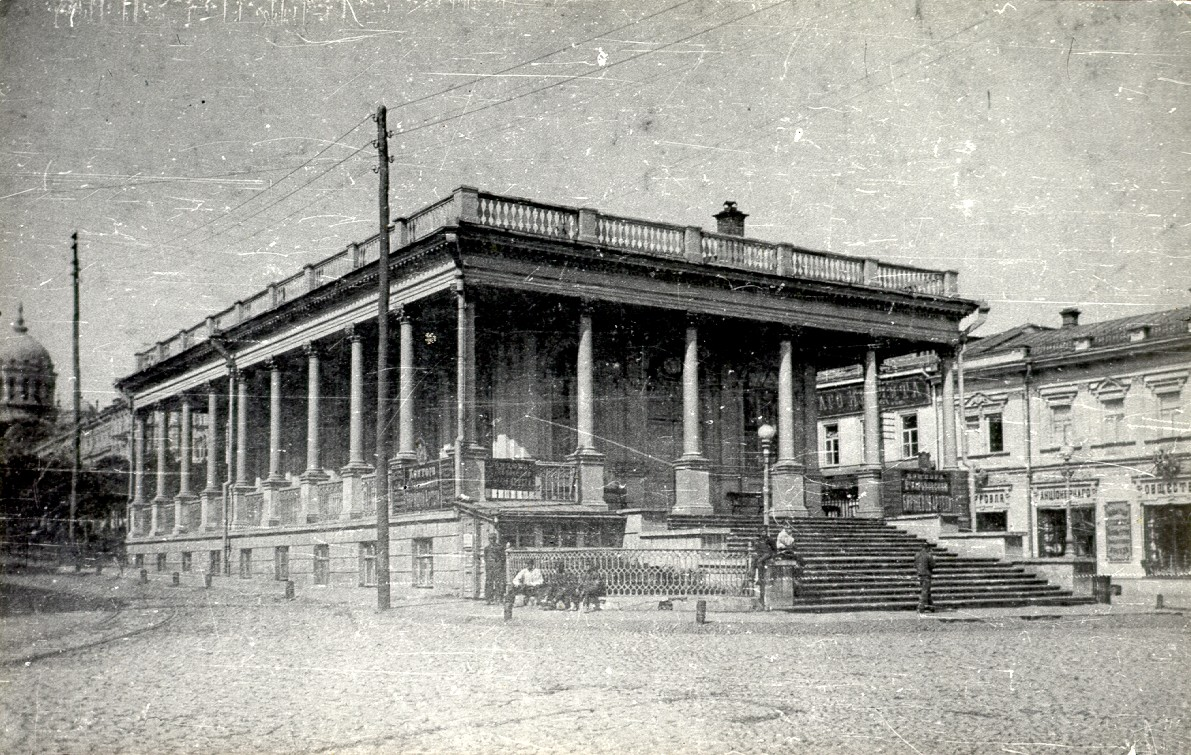
The building of the Kharkiv City Exchange, built according to the project of P. N. Gorlov (Kharkov, 1914)

Pyotr Nikolayevich Gorlov (Russian: Пётр Никола́евич Го́рлов; 11 May 1839 in Irkutsk, Irkutsk Governorate, Russian Empire – 20 November 1915) was a Russian geologist and engineer who explored coal deposits in the Donets Basin, the Caucasus, Central Asia and Ussuri Krai. The city of Gorlovka was named after him; the city has a monument in honor of him.
