= Eduard Bogdanov (footballer, born 1994) =

Russian football player

Personal information
- Full name: Eduard Sergeyevich Bogdanov
- Date of birth: 8 May 1994 (age 32)
- Place of birth: Irkutsk, Russia
- Height: 1.79 m (5 ft 10 in)
- Positions: Forward; midfielder

Senior career*
Years	Team	Apps	(Gls)
2012–2016	Baikal Irkutsk	56	(6)
2016–2018	Sibir Novosibirsk	6	(0)
2019	Kyzyltash Bakhchisaray	1	(0)
2022–2023	Irkutsk (amateur)		
2023–2024	Irkutsk	29	(2)
- * Club domestic league appearances and goals

Eduard Sergeyevich Bogdanov (Russian: Эдуард Серге́евич Богданов; born 8 May 1994) is a Russian former football player.

== Club career ==
He made his debut in the Russian Second Division for FC Baikal Irkutsk on 15 July 2012 in a game against FC Sakhalin Yuzhno-Sakhalinsk. He made his Russian Football National League debut for Baikal on 28 September 2015 in a game against FC Sibir Novosibirsk.
