= Vasiliy Kulik =

Soviet serial killer and rapist

- Born: Vasiliy Sergeyevich Kulik; 17 January 1956; Irkutsk, Irkutsk Oblast, RSFSR, Soviet Union
- Died: 26 June 1989 (aged 33); Angarsk Colony, Irkutsk Oblast, RSFSR, Soviet Union
- Cause of death: Execution by shooting
- Other names: "The Irkutsk Monster" "The Murder Doctor" "The Murderer"
- Convictions: Murder, rape, assault
- Penalty: Death

Details
- Victims: 13 Killed 27+ Raped
- Span of crimes: 1982–1986
- Country: Soviet Union
- States: Irkutsk, Kirovohrad
- Date apprehended: January 17, 1986

Vasiliy Sergeyevich Kulik (Russian: Василий Серге́евич Кулик; 17 January 1956 – 26 June 1989) was a Soviet serial killer convicted for the killing of 13 people and nearly 30 rapes in Irkutsk between 1982 and 1986.

Originally a serial rapist, Kulik was a violent paedophile and gerontophile that targeted children and elderly women in Irkutsk over a two-year period. Using various methods, he began to murder his victims until his arrest after a failed attack, where he was convicted and sentenced to death.

Kulik was executed by firing squad in 1989.

== Background ==
Vasiliy Kulik was born on 17 January 1956 in Irkutsk, RSFSR, Soviet Union. The youngest of three children, his father Sergei Kulik was a doctor of Biological Sciences and writer, his mother a school headmistress. The Kulik family were considered respectable, and Vasiliy had a good relationship with his family except for occasional aggressive outbursts. According to his family, Kulik was a sleepwalker and tortured animals from an early age. In school he was a keen boxer, becoming the city boxing champion, and had many girlfriends. Notable was one girl with whom he was involved but the latter became depressed after she moved to another city.

At age 18, Kulik served in the Soviet Army from 1974 to 1976, and after his discharge from the army, he began studying to become a doctor at the Irkutsk Medical Institute. During this time Kulik attempted to seduce numerous women, including fellow students and married women, who frequently rejected him. Kulik eventually married a lawyer, with whom he had children.

In 1980, Kulik was robbed and severely beaten by youths, where he received injuries to his head. Kulik later stated "... The last 5-6 years (after the head injury) I regularly visit the thoughts of a sexual nature, where I perform sexual acts with children. At first, I was only thinking about the girls, and then about the boys, as well as the old women ..." The same year, Kulik wrote a novel in which the main character forms a relationship with a nine-year-old girl with the sole purpose of having sex with her.

== Crimes ==
In 1982, Kulik graduated from the Irkutsk Medical Institute, and left home to begin work as a medic at the ambulance station in the Irkutsk Emergency Station. Kulik frequently used the information of his patients to break into their homes, where he committed a series of child rapes, very few of which were reported to the police.

Kulik committed his first murder in 1984 when he drugged, raped and strangled an elderly woman he encountered on the street. His second victim was an eight-year-old girl, and his third was a 53-year-old woman whom he killed with a gun and a kitchen knife. Over the next two years, Kulik's victims included six children and seven elderly women, the youngest was only 2 years old and the oldest was 75 years old.

== Arrest and execution ==
On 17 January 1986, Kulik's 30th birthday, he was arrested after a failed attack where he was beaten and subdued. Kulik confessed to committing all of his murders, but his testimony was initially rejected until further investigations proved him right.

On 11 August 1988, Kulik was convicted for the 13 murders he had previously admitted to and nearly 30 additional rapes and assaults. Kulik was sentenced to death and was executed by firing squad on 26 June 1989 in Irkutsk.

== See also ==
- List of Russian serial killers
- List of serial killers by number of victims
