= International Astronomical Union =

Association of professional astronomers

International Astronomical Union (IAU)
- Union astronomique internationale (UAI)

- National members from 85 countries as of May 2023 Member states States with interim status Observer states Suspended states
- Abbreviation: IAU/UAI
- Formation: 28 July 1919; 107 years ago
- Founded at: Brussels, Belgium
- Type: INGO
- Headquarters: Paris, France
- Region served: Worldwide
- Members: 85 national members 13,119 individual members
- President: Willy Benz
- General Secretary: Diana Mary Worrall
- Website: IAU.org

The International Astronomical Union (IAU; French: Union astronomique internationale, UAI) is an international non-governmental organization (INGO) with the objective of advancing astronomy in all aspects, including promoting astronomical research, outreach, education, and development through global cooperation. It was founded on 28 July 1919 in Brussels, Belgium, and is based in Paris, France.

The IAU is composed of individual members, who include both professional astronomers and junior scientists, and national members, such as professional associations, national societies, or academic institutions. Individual members are organised into divisions, committees, and working groups centered on particular subdisciplines, subjects, or initiatives. As of May 2024, the Union had 85 national members and 12,734 individual members, spanning 90 countries and territories.

Among the key activities of the IAU is serving as a forum for scientific conferences. It sponsors nine annual symposia and holds a triannual General Assembly that sets policy and includes various scientific meetings. The Union is best known for being the leading authority in assigning official names and designations to astronomical objects, and for setting uniform definitions for astronomical principles. It also coordinates with national and international partners, such as UNESCO, to fulfill its mission.

The IAU is a member of the International Science Council, which is composed of international scholarly and scientific institutions and national academies of sciences.

== Function ==
The International Astronomical Union is an international association of professional astronomers, at the PhD level and beyond, active in professional research and education in astronomy. Among other activities, it acts as the recognized authority for assigning designations and names to celestial bodies (stars, planets, asteroids, etc.) and any surface features on them.

The IAU is a member of the International Science Council. Its main objective is to promote and safeguard the science of astronomy in all its aspects through international cooperation. The IAU maintains friendly relations with organizations that include amateur astronomers in their membership. The IAU has its head office on the second floor of the Institut d'Astrophysique de Paris in the 14th arrondissement of Paris.

This organisation has many working groups. For example, the Working Group for Planetary System Nomenclature (WGPSN), which maintains the astronomical naming conventions and planetary nomenclature for planetary bodies, and the Working Group on Star Names (WGSN), which catalogues and standardizes proper names for stars. The IAU is also responsible for the system of astronomical telegrams which are produced and distributed on its behalf by the Central Bureau for Astronomical Telegrams. The Minor Planet Center also operates under the IAU, and is a "clearinghouse" for all non-planetary or non-moon bodies in the Solar System.

== History ==
The IAU was founded on 28 July 1919, at the Constitutive Assembly of the International Research Council (now the International Science Council) held in Brussels, Belgium. Two subsidiaries of the IAU were also created at this assembly: the International Time Commission seated at the International Time Bureau in Paris, France, and the International Central Bureau of Astronomical Telegrams initially seated in Copenhagen, Denmark.

The seven initial member states were Belgium, Canada, France, Great Britain, Greece, Japan, and the United States, soon to be followed by Italy and Mexico. The first executive committee consisted of Benjamin Baillaud (President, France), Alfred Fowler (General Secretary, UK), and four vice presidents: William Campbell (US), Frank Dyson (UK), Georges Lecointe (Belgium), and Annibale Riccò (Italy). Thirty-two Commissions (referred to initially as Standing Committees) were appointed at the Brussels meeting and focused on topics ranging from relativity to minor planets. The reports of these 32 Commissions formed the main substance of the first General Assembly, which took place in Rome, Italy, 2–10 May 1922.

By the end of the first General Assembly, ten additional nations (Australia, Brazil, Czechoslovakia, Denmark, the Netherlands, Norway, Poland, Romania, South Africa, and Spain) had joined the Union, bringing the total membership to 19 countries. Although the Union was officially formed eight months after the end of World War I, international collaboration in astronomy had been strong in the pre-war era (e.g., the Astronomische Gesellschaft Katalog projects since 1868, the Astrographic Catalogue since 1887, and the International Union for Solar research since 1904).

The first 50 years of the Union's history are well documented. Subsequent history is recorded in the form of reminiscences of past IAU Presidents and General Secretaries. Twelve of the fourteen past General Secretaries in the period 1964–2006 contributed their recollections of the Union's history in IAU Information Bulletin No. 100. Six past IAU Presidents in the period 1976–2003 also contributed their recollections in IAU Information Bulletin No. 104.

In 2015 and 2019, the Union held the NameExoWorlds contests.

Starting in 2024, the Union, in partnership with the United Nations, is poised to play a critical role in developing the legislation and framework for lunar industrialization.

== Composition ==
The IAU includes member organizations from 82 countries (designated as national members).

As of 1 August 2019, the IAU has a total of 13,701 individual members, who are professional astronomers from 102 countries worldwide; 81.7% of individual members are male, while 18.3% are female.

Membership also includes 82 national members, professional astronomical communities representing their country's affiliation with the IAU. National members include the Australian Academy of Science, the Chinese Astronomical Society, the French Academy of Sciences, the Indian National Science Academy, the National Academies (United States), the National Research Foundation of South Africa, the National Scientific and Technical Research Council (Argentina), the Council of German Observatories, the Royal Astronomical Society (United Kingdom), the Royal Astronomical Society of New Zealand, the Royal Swedish Academy of Sciences, the Russian Academy of Sciences, and the Science Council of Japan, among many others.

The sovereign body of the IAU is its General Assembly, which comprises all members. The Assembly determines IAU policy, approves the Statutes and By-Laws of the Union (and amendments proposed thereto) and elects various committees.

The right to vote on matters brought before the Assembly varies according to the type of business under discussion. The Statutes consider such business to be divided into two categories:

- issues of a "primarily scientific nature" (as determined by the Executive Committee), upon which voting is restricted to individual members, and
- all other matters (such as Statute revision and procedural questions), upon which voting is restricted to the representatives of national members.

On budget matters (which fall into the second category), votes are weighted according to the relative subscription levels of the national members. A second category vote requires a turnout of at least two-thirds of national members to be valid. An absolute majority is sufficient for approval in any vote, except for Statute revision which requires a two-thirds majority. An equality of votes is resolved by the vote of the President of the Union.

=== List of national members ===
==== Africa ====
- Algeria
- Egypt
- Ethiopia
- Ghana
- Madagascar
- Morocco
- Mozambique
- Nigeria
- South Africa

==== Asia ====
- Armenia
- China
- Cyprus
- Georgia (suspended)
- India
- Indonesia
- Iran (suspended)
- Israel
- Japan
- Jordan
- Kazakhstan
- Lebanon (suspended)
- Malaysia
- Mongolia
- North Korea (suspended)
- Philippines
- Saudi Arabia (suspended)
- South Korea
- Syria
- Taiwan
- Tajikistan
- Thailand
- Turkey
- United Arab Emirates
- Vietnam (suspended)

==== Europe ====
- Austria
- Belgium
- Bulgaria
- Croatia
- Czechia
- Denmark
- Estonia
- Finland
- France
- Germany
- Greece
- Hungary
- Iceland
- Ireland
- Italy
- Latvia
- Lithuania
- Netherlands
- Norway
- Poland
- Portugal
- Romania
- Russia
- Serbia
- Slovakia
- Slovenia
- Spain
- Sweden
- Switzerland
- Ukraine
- United Kingdom
- Vatican City

==== North America ====
- Canada
- Costa Rica (interim)
- Honduras (interim)
- Mexico
- Panama (interim)
- United States

==== Oceania ====
- Australia
- New Zealand

==== South America ====
- Argentina
- Bolivia
- Brazil
- Chile
- Colombia
- Ecuador (observer)
- Peru (suspended)
- Uruguay (observer)
- Venezuela (suspended)

=== Terminated national members ===
- Azerbaijan
- Cuba
- North Macedonia
- Uzbekistan

== General Assemblies ==
Since 1922, the IAU General Assembly meets every three years, except for the period between 1938 and 1948, due to World War II. After a Polish request in 1967, and by a controversial decision of the then President of the IAU, an Extraordinary IAU General Assembly was held in September 1973 in Warsaw, Poland, to commemorate the 500th anniversary of the birth of Nicolaus Copernicus, soon after the regular 1973 GA had been held in Sydney.

Meeting	Year	Venue
Ist IAU General Assembly (1st)	1922	Rome, Italy
IInd IAU General Assembly (2nd)	1925	Cambridge, England, United Kingdom
IIIrd IAU General Assembly (3rd)	1928	Leiden, Netherlands
IVth IAU General Assembly (4th)	1932	Cambridge, Massachusetts, United States
Vth IAU General Assembly (5th)	1935	Paris, France
VIth IAU General Assembly (6th)	1938	Stockholm, Sweden
VIIth IAU General Assembly (7th)	1948	Zürich, Switzerland
VIIIth IAU General Assembly (8th)	1952	Rome, Italy
IXth IAU General Assembly (9th)	1955	Dublin, Ireland
Xth IAU General Assembly (10th)	1958	Moscow, Soviet Union
XIth IAU General Assembly (11th)	1961	Berkeley, California, United States
XIIth IAU General Assembly (12th)	1964	Hamburg, West Germany
XIIIth IAU General Assembly (13th)	1967	Prague, Czechoslovakia
XIVth IAU General Assembly (14th)	1970	Brighton, England, United Kingdom
XVth IAU General Assembly (15th)	1973	Sydney, Australia
XVIth IAU General Assembly (16th)	1976	Grenoble, France
XVIIth IAU General Assembly (17th)	1979	Montreal, Quebec, Canada
XVIIIth IAU General Assembly (18th)	1982	Patras, Greece
XIXth IAU General Assembly (19th)	1985	New Delhi, India
XXth IAU General Assembly (20th)	1988	Baltimore, Maryland, United States
XXIst IAU General Assembly (21st)	1991	Buenos Aires, Argentina
XXIInd IAU General Assembly (22nd)	1994	The Hague, Netherlands
XXIIIrd IAU General Assembly (23rd)	1997	Kyoto, Japan
XXIVth IAU General Assembly (24th)	2000	Manchester, England, United Kingdom
XXVth IAU General Assembly (25th)	2003	Sydney, Australia
XXVIth IAU General Assembly (26th)	2006	Prague, Czech Republic
XXVIIth IAU General Assembly (27th)	2009	Rio de Janeiro, Brazil
XXVIIIth IAU General Assembly (28th)	2012	Beijing, China
XXIXth IAU General Assembly (29th)	2015	Honolulu, Hawaii, United States
XXXth IAU General Assembly (30th)	2018	Vienna, Austria
XXXIst IAU General Assembly (31st)	2022	Busan, South Korea
XXXIInd IAU General Assembly (32nd)	2024	Cape Town, South Africa
XXXIIIrd IAU General Assembly (33rd)	2027	Rome, Italy
XXXIVth IAU General Assembly (34th)	2030	Santiago, Chile

== List of the presidents of the IAU ==
Sources.

- (1919–1922) (France) Benjamin Baillaud
- (1922–1925) (United States) William Wallace Campbell
- (1925–1928) (Netherlands) Willem de Sitter
- (1928–1932) (United Kingdom) Frank Watson Dyson
- (1932–1935) (United States) Frank Schlesinger
- (1935–1938) (France) Ernest Esclangon
- (1938–1944) (United Kingdom) Arthur Eddington
- (1944–1948) (United Kingdom) Harold Spencer Jones
- (1948–1952) (Sweden) Bertil Lindblad
- (1952–1955) (United States) Otto Struve
- (1955–1958) (France) André-Louis Danjon
- (1958–1961) (Netherlands) Jan Oort
- (1961–1964) (Soviet Union) Victor Ambartsumian
- (1964–1967) (Belgium) Pol Swings
- (1967–1970) (West Germany) Otto Heckmann
- (1970–1973) (Denmark) Bengt Strömgren
- (1973–1976) (United States) Leo Goldberg
- (1976–1979) (Netherlands) Adriaan Blaauw
- (1979–1982) (India) Vainu Bappu
- (1982–1985) (United Kingdom) Robert Hanbury Brown
- (1985–1988) (Argentina) Jorge Sahade
- (1988–1991) (Japan) Yoshihide Kozai
- (1991–1994) (Russia) Alexandr Boyarchuk
- (1994–1997) (Netherlands) Lodewijk Woltjer
- (1997–2000) (United States) Robert Kraft
- (2000–2003) (Italy) Franco Pacini
- (2003–2006) (Australia) Ronald Ekers
- (2006–2009) (France) (Argentina) Catherine Cesarsky
- (2009–2012) (United States) Robert Williams
- (2012–2015) (Japan) Norio Kaifu
- (2015–2018) (Mexico) Silvia Torres-Peimbert
- (2018–2021) (Netherlands) Ewine van Dishoeck
- (2021–2024) (United States) Debra Elmegreen
- (2024–present) (Switzerland) Willy Benz

== Commission 46: Education in astronomy ==
Commission 46 is a Committee of the Executive Committee of the IAU, playing a special role in the discussion of astronomy development with governments and scientific academies. The IAU is affiliated with the International Council of Scientific Unions (ICSU), a non-governmental organization representing a global membership that includes both national scientific bodies and international scientific unions. They often encourage countries to become members of the IAU. The Commission further seeks to development, information or improvement of astronomical education. Part of Commission 46, is Teaching Astronomy for Development (TAD) program in countries where there is currently very little astronomical education. Another program is named the Galileo Teacher Training Program (GTTP), is a project of the International Year of Astronomy 2009, among which Hands-On Universe that will concentrate more resources on education activities for children and schools designed to advance sustainable global development. GTTP is also concerned with the effective use and transfer of astronomy education tools and resources into classroom science curricula. A strategic plan for the period 2010–2020 has been published.

== Publications ==
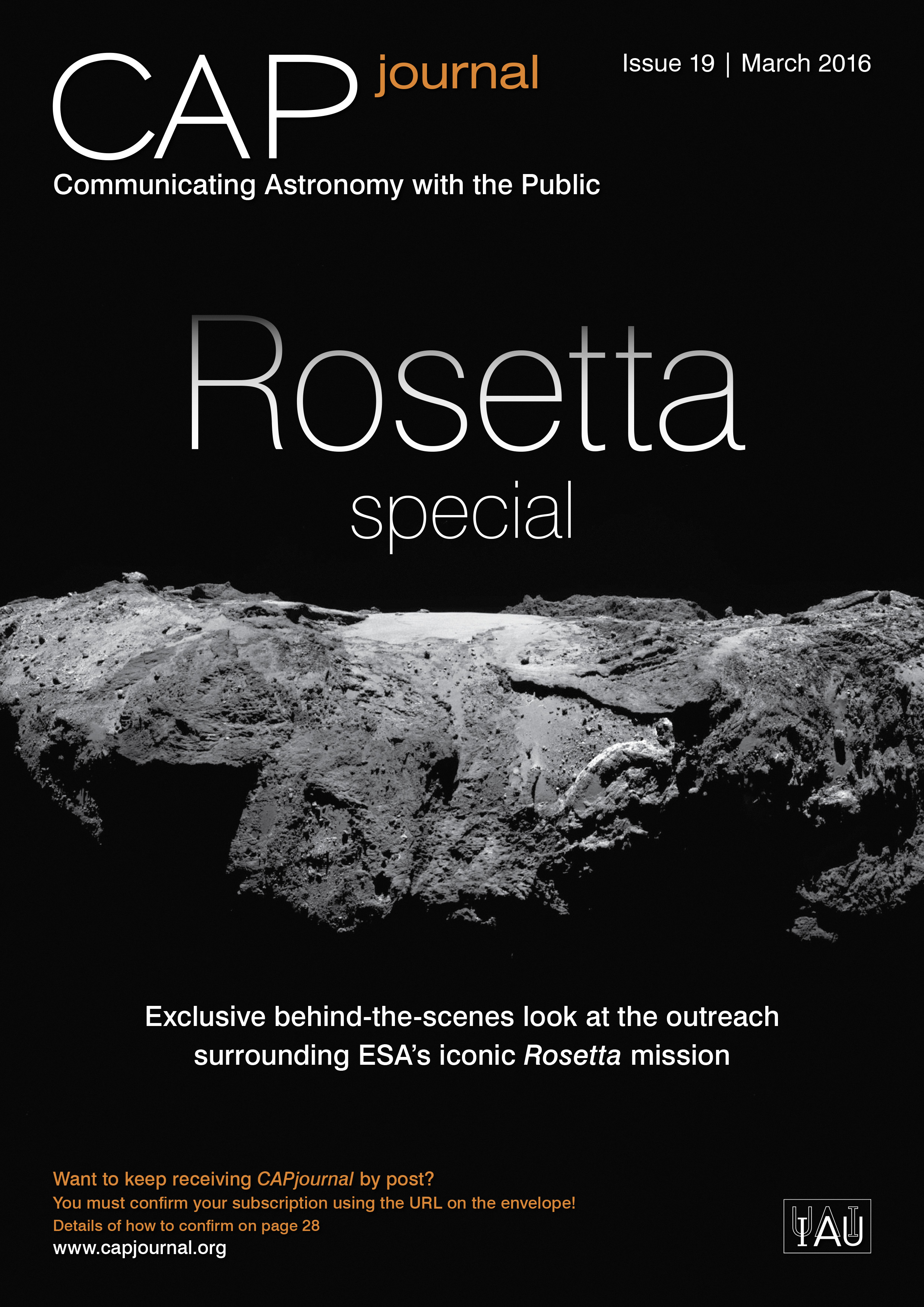
Cover picture of CAP Journal issue 19, March 2016

In 2004 the IAU contracted with the Cambridge University Press to publish the Proceedings of the International Astronomical Union.

In 2007, the Communicating Astronomy with the Public Journal Working Group prepared a study assessing the feasibility of the Communicating Astronomy with the Public Journal (CAP Journal).

== See also ==
- List of astronomy acronyms
- Astronomical naming conventions
- List of proper names of stars
- Planetary nomenclature
- Standards of Fundamental Astronomy
