= Andrei Semyonov (footballer, born 1957) =

Russian footballer

Personal information
- Full name: Andrei Alfredovich Semyonov
- Date of birth: 22 May 1957 (age 69)
- Place of birth: Irkutsk, Russian SFSR
- Height: 1.85 m (6 ft 1 in)
- Position: Goalkeeper

Senior career*
Years	Team	Apps	(Gls)
1974–1990	FC Zvezda Irkutsk	340	(0)
1991	FC Okean Nakhodka	36	(0)
1992	FC Selenga Ulan-Ude	9	(0)
1992	FC Okean Nakhodka	3	(0)
1993–1994	FC Zvezda Irkutsk	49	(0)
- * Club domestic league appearances and goals

Andrei Alfredovich Semyonov (Russian: Андрей Альфредович Семёнов; born 22 May 1957) is a Russian former football player.
