= Konstantin Drokov =

Russian ice hockey player (born 1995)

- Born: September 8, 1995 (age 30) Irkutsk, Russia
- Height: 5 ft 11 in (180 cm)
- Weight: 161 lb (73 kg; 11 st 7 lb)
- Position: Defence
- Shoots: Right
- KHL team: Metallurg Novokuznetsk
- NHL draft: Undrafted
- Playing career: 2014–present

Konstantin Drokov (born September 8, 1995) is a Russian ice hockey defenceman. He is currently playing with Metallurg Novokuznetsk of the Kontinental Hockey League (KHL).

Drokov made his Kontinental Hockey League debut playing with Metallurg Novokuznetsk during the 2014–15 KHL season.
