= Mariya Ovechkina =

Russian model (born 1990)

Mariia Zhabinskaia (Ovechkina)
- Born: Mariya Ovechkina; 1990 (age 35–36); Irkutsk, Russia
- Height: 1.78 m (5 ft 10 in)
- Beauty pageant titleholder
- Title: Mrs Russia World 2020. Miss Irkutsk 2009 (Winner)
- Hair color: blond

Mariya Ovechkina (born 1990) is a beauty contest contestant who won the title of Miss Irkutsk in 2009 and participated in the Miss Russia 2010 contest.

== Biography ==
Ovechkina was born in Severomorsk and . She won the 2009 Miss Irkutsk contest. At the time she studied at the Baikal University of Economics and Law, in the modern dance program. Ovechkina was hoping to become an economist and entrepreneur, open her own restaurant in Irkutsk, and release a music album consisting of the songs from her pageant performances.
