= Alexander Shulgin (musician) =

Russian author and composer (born 1964)

Alexander Valeryevich Shulgin Александр Валерьевич Шульгин
- Born: August 25, 1964 (age 62); Irkutsk, Russian SFSR, Soviet Union (present-day Russia)
- Occupation: Composer
- Website: www.shulgin.com

Alexander Valeryevich Shulgin (Note: Russian: Александр Валерьевич Шульгин, romanized: Aleksandr Valeryevich Shulgin) (born August 25, 1964) is a Russian author and composer. He was born in Irkutsk, Russia, and currently lives in Moscow.

== Music career ==
Shulgin's career began at the age of 19 in Russian rock band Kruiz. The band is regarded as legendary for being the first rock band from the USSR to tour abroad (1983–1986). The popularity of The Kruiz was remarkable as they were known as anti-Soviet, and there was no mention of the band in mass media. With the advent of reorganization of the USSR, in 1985, The Kruiz sold 20 million copies of their first album and in 1987 the album was released by WEA (Germany).

After The Kruiz, Shulgin began working in Germany, where he created "The Taiga Symphony". This was a combination of Russian classic music with western rock-music with music by Vitally Bondarchuck and lyrics by American composer Richard Niles. The album featured The Moscow Symphony Orchestra conducted by Pavel Kogan and respected Western musicians Alvin Lee, Paul Carrack, Mel Collins, Phil Palmer and J.J. Belle. Successful in the USSR, it was the beginning of the career of Valeriya who has become one of the most popular singers in Russia.

Shulgin then created "Merry Christmas to the World", an East-West collaboration between Shulgin and BBC Worldwide. With music by Shulgin and lyrics and production by Richard Niles, it expressed the ethos of glasnost. London studio musicians performed with members of the Moscow Symphony and the Soviet Folk Orchestra. Sung by Valeria, the video was directed by Ken Russell who used it in his film "Alice in Russialand" (1998). Shot in Red Square, the clip featured psychic Uri Geller. During a special communication, astronauts from the "Star Township" introduced Valeria while in orbit around the Earth. The clip became the grand finale of the New Year program on the first national TV channel of the Soviet Union.

Shulgin wrote compositions for the albums "Anna", released in 1995, "Famillia, and "The eyes of the sky colour".

Shulgin helped “FM GROUP” to record their debut album, MADE IN RUSSIA and recorded an album of Alexander Byinov. Afterwards Shulgin recorded a solo album for “FM GROUP” lead-singer Alevtina Egorova, and also worked with Tatiana Ovsienko, Nastya Shirokova. In spring of 2005, Shulgin got the suggestion to write music for the new music serial with the tentative title “Primadonna”, the serial made for showing on the Russian TV Channel. For this “Primadonna” serial Alexander wrote 20 original songs, and at the very least three leading themes from the film and all the songs of a composer got into the final variant of “Primadonna”. Shulgin also wrote all the music filling-out for the new socio-political TV Channel “SPAS” (The Festival of the Saviour).

Shulgin released his first solo album “Predstavlenie” (The Introduction), and Shulgin signed with TheOrchard.com. The album was released worldwide.

Shulgin wrote material for two albums by Elena Sheremet, Lady-Sax and Lady-sax (The Remixes).

Successful Russian artists who have recorded Shulgin's songs include Valeriya, Alexander Buinov, The Band FM, Yulia Mikhalchik, Drugie Pravila and Tatyana Ovsienko. Shulgin’s songs have topped the Russian and Eastern European charts such as Bratislava Lyre '93.

As a producer, Shulgin has had more than 20 hit albums, five of which were Number 1. He has also had ten Number 1 albums as co-producer.

Alexander Shulgin has written many hits in Russia. His awards for "Song of The Year" include Aeroplane (1994), Something Common (1995), You Are Somewhere Round There (1999), Snowstorm (2000) and Don’t Hurt Me(2001). Shulgin's adaptation of the 18th century Russian song Flowers won many prizes including "Montreux 1992," "Anigraf 1992," Generation 1992.

Shulgin is also a composer of music for films and TV, his songs appearing in films by Lukas Moodysson and Ken Russell. He is also the director of the first public TV channel "Spas" and composed all the music for the channel.

As the producer and judge of such popular TV music contests as "Become a Star" (the Russian version of "Pop Star") and "Star Factory" (the Russian version of "Star Academy") Shulgin may be said to be the "Simon Cowell of Russia." He also judges many other Russian and international contests. British singer Sam Brown took part in his popular Russian contest "Morning Star" and Shulgin was also a judge on "Donetsk Olympus" (Ukraine).

Shulgin compositions appear on the three-part music compilation Tryptych.

Tryptych. Shulgin’s Songbook. Part I was recorded with instrumentalists Simon Rushby, Steve King, Jon Howell, with lead guitars by Paul Drew. The album was recorded in spring 2008 in Great Britain, at DWB Music record studio. The record was produced by English producers Paul Drew, Greig Watts and Pete Barringer.

Tryptych. Shulgin’s Songbook. Part II is a piano album played by Gary Husband, played in a “minimal” style. One of the album tracks – an instrumental duet – was recorded together with Martin Taylor. The record was recorded in the end of summer 2007 in one of the London studios, produced by Richard Niles.

Тruptych. Shulgin’s Songbook. Part III was made in a “smooth jazz” style, recorded together with jazz musicians Billy Cobham, John Patitucci, Bob James, Bob Mintzer and others. The material was recorded during spring and summer of 2007 at New-York and London studios. Richard Niles was a producer of the album.

== Business career ==
Shulgin advises Russian and foreign companies on New Media, lecturing at exhibitions and conferences all over the world including Beijing, Hong Kong, Berlin and London.

As a businessman, Alexander Shulgin deals with projects in digital media and new media. He invested and created a list of successful projects and services.

=== At the beginning of Russian business ===
- 1989 – created one of the first Russian private companies (c-p SHULGIN), working in the field of intellectual property, copyright and music publishing.
- 1989 - co-founder of one of the first recording company LAD, specializing in classical music with one of the biggest catalogs of Russian classical music.
- 1990–1995 - creating a big distribution company presenting consumer electronics on the Russian and CIS market. The company was one of the five biggest Russian wholesale companies with multistore in Moscow.
- 1992 - creating the Association of recording companies and distribution Becar. Later it became recording company Becar, and Alexander was founder and main shareholder. The company was a market leader in 1993–1999. It has also the biggest distribution multistore and production of MC and CD audio.

Later the company Familia was created, and it became the Gruppa Kompaniy Familia.

=== Gruppa Kompaniy Familia ===
Shulgin is the owner and director of the Familia group of companies, which are involved innew media business, publishing and entertainment.

=== rASiA.com Forum & Festival ===
In May 2012, Shulgin launched a start-up project rASiA.com Forum & Festival - an event consisting of Forum with a focus on content, new technologies, new media and distribution, and Festival of modern Asian culture.

Shulgin is co-founder of 5 Continent Consalting Group and iMusicTV.

=== Expert activity ===
In 2006, Shulgin began writing a column in a new business online newspaper "Vzglyad" focusing on New Media in Russia.

Since 2010, Shulgin has been a columnist of NEWSmusic.ru.

=== Public activity ===
Shulgin is a member of the Russian Authors Society and has been involved in developing new media space in Russia.
