= Institute of Astronomy of the Russian Academy of Sciences =

Soviet-Russian research institute

- Headquarters: Moscow, Russia
- Location: 48 Pyatnitskaya St. 119017,
- Director: Dr. M.E. Sachkov
- Parent organization: Russian Academy of Sciences
- Website: http://www.inasan.rssi.ru/eng/geninfo.html

The Institute of Astronomy of the Russian Academy of Sciences was known as the Astronomical Council of the Academy of Sciences USSR until 1990.

== Overview ==
The institute is involved in developing and launching space-based astronomy platforms, and scientific research that investigates the origins of stars, solar systems, and galactic formations. The institute also contains the Library for Natural Sciences of the Russian Academy of Sciences (LNS RAS), founded in 1947.

In addition, an extensive body of published scientific literature has been published over the years.

=== Library ===
The institute library holds foreign literature, besides Russian literature, of the 18th through the 21st centuries. The topics of interest are: astronomy, physics mathematics, mechanics, Earth sciences, cosmonautics, and electronics. The library consists of 60,000 items consisting of 10,000 books and 50,000 periodicals.
