= FC Zenit Irkutsk =

Russian football team

Zenit Irkutsk
- Full name: Football Club Zenit Irkutsk
- Founded: 2003
- Dissolved: 2021
- Ground: Trud Stadium
- Capacity: 16,500
- League: Russian Professional Football League, Group 2
- 2019–20: Zone East, 6th

FC Zenit Irkutsk (Russian: «Зенит» (Иркутск)) is a defunct Russian football team from Irkutsk. It was founded in 2003 and participated in amateur competitions. Before the 2016–17 season, it was licensed to play in the third-tier Russian Professional Football League after another Irkutsk team, FC Baikal Irkutsk, failed to get a license. On 1 April 2021, the club announced that they will be dissolved due to lack of financing. From 2010 to 2013, it was called FC Zenit-Rekord Irkutsk.

== See also ==
- FC Irkutsk
