= FC Irkutsk =

Irkutsk
- Full name: Football Club Irkutsk
- Founded: 2019
- Ground: Trud Stadium
- Capacity: 16,500
- Chairman: Roman Gorodnichev
- Manager: Vasily Dorofeyev
- League: N/A
- 2025: Russian Second League; Division B Group 2; 3rd
- Website: fc-irkutsk.ru

FC Irkutsk (Russian: ФК «Иркутск») is a Russian football club based in Irkutsk. It started playing on the amateur level in 2019. For the 2023 season, the club was admitted to the newly organized fourth-tier Russian Second League Division B. The city was previously represented in national professional competitions by FC Zvezda Irkutsk (1957–2008), FC Baikal Irkutsk (2010–2016) and FC Zenit Irkutsk (2016–2021). FC Irkutsk dropped out of the Russian Second League on 22 July 2026 for financial reasons.
