= 1997 in Russian football =

1997 season

1997 was the sixth season Russia held its own national football competition since the breakup of the Soviet Union.

== Club competitions ==
FC Spartak Moscow won the title for the fifth time. This was the last season fourth tier of the Russian football was a professional Russian Third League.

For more details, see:

- 1997 Russian Top League
- 1997 Russian First League
- 1997 Russian Second League
- 1997 Russian Third League

== Cup competitions ==
The fifth edition of the Russian Cup, 1996–97 Russian Cup was won by FC Lokomotiv Moscow, who beat FC Dynamo Moscow in the finals with a score of 2–0.

Early stages of the 1997–98 Russian Cup were played later in the year.

== European club competitions ==
=== 1996–97 UEFA Champions League, 1996–97 UEFA Cup Winners' Cup, 1996–97 UEFA Cup ===
Russian teams were eliminated in 1996.

=== 1997–98 UEFA Champions League ===
FC Spartak Moscow were eliminated in the second qualifying round and went on to the UEFA Cup.

- August 13, 1997 / Second qualifying round, First leg / 1. FC Košice – FC Spartak Moscow 2-1 (Kožlej 15' Kozák 40' (pen.) – Dmitriev 37') / Košice, Lokomotíva Stadium / Attendance: 12,600

FC Spartak Moscow: Filimonov, Gorlukovich, Khlestov, Tsymbalar (captain), Mamedov (Evseev, 77), Ananko, Bakharev (Melyoshin, 45), Alenichev, Titov, Dmitriev (Robson, 81), Tikhonov.

- August 27, 1997 / Second qualifying round, Return leg / FC Spartak Moscow – 1. FC Košice 0-0 / Moscow, Lokomotiv Stadium / Attendance: 20,000

FC Spartak Moscow: Filimonov, Gorlukovich, Khlestov, Tsymbalar (captain), Ananko (Golovskoy, 46), Evseev, Robson (Lutovinov, 75), Alenichev, Titov, Dmitriev (Kechinov, 32), Tikhonov.

=== 1997–98 UEFA Cup Winners' Cup ===
FC Lokomotiv Moscow qualified for the quarterfinals stage that was played in 1998.

- September 18, 1997 / First round, first leg / Belshina Bobruisk – FC Lokomotiv Moscow (Hlebasolaw 14' (pen.) – Loskov 49' Borodyuk 72') / Minsk, Dinamo Stadium / Attendance: 4,000

FC Lokomotiv Moscow: Podshivalov, Solomatin, Drozdov, Kharlachyov, Arifullin, Chugainov (captain), Smirnov, Borodyuk, Janashia (Bulykin, 79), Loskov, Cherevchenko.

- October 2, 1997 / First round, return leg / FC Lokomotiv Moscow – FC Belshina Bobruisk 3–0 (Maminov 23' Kharlachyov 41' Loskov 74') / Moscow, Lokomotiv Stadium / Attendance: 1,500

FC Lokomotiv Moscow: Bidzhiyev, Solomatin, Drozdov, Kharlachyov, Arifullin, Chugainov (captain), Smirnov (Sarkisyan, 64), Cherevchenko (Pashinin, 75), Janashia (Veselov, 69), Loskov, Maminov.

- October 23, 1997 / Second round, first leg / FC Lokomotiv Moscow – Kocaelispor 2–1 (Kharlachyov 32' Janashia 84' – Turan 73') / Moscow, Lokomotiv Stadium / Attendance: 3,500

FC Lokomotiv Moscow: Bidzhiyev, Solomatin, Drozdov (Pashinin, 89), Kharlachyov, Cherevchenko, Chugainov (captain), Maminov (Sarkisyan, 81), Gurenko, Janashia, Loskov, Veselov (Smirnov, 46).

- November 6, 1997 / Second round, return leg / Kocaelispor – FC Lokomotiv Moscow 0–0 / İzmit, Ismet Pasa Stadium / Attendance: 15,000.

FC Lokomotiv Moscow: Bidzhiyev, Solomatin, Drozdov, Kharlachyov, Arifullin, Chugainov (captain), Smirnov (Sarkisyan, 82), Gurenko, Pashinin, Loskov, Veselov (Maminov, 73).

=== 1997–98 UEFA Cup ===
FC Spartak Moscow qualified for the quarterfinals stage that was played in 1998. FC Rotor Volgograd reached the second round. FC Alania Vladikavkaz went out in the first round.

- August 12, 1997 / Second qualifying round, First leg / FC Alania Vladikavkaz – FC Dnipro Dnipropetrovsk 2-1 (Žutautas 18' Ashvetia 58' – Palyanytsya 8') / Vladikavkaz, Republican Spartak Stadium / Attendance: 32,000

FC Alania Vladikavkaz: Kramarenko, Pagayev, Timofeev, Žutautas, Agayev (Ashvetia, 32), Tsveiba, Tedeyev (captain), Dzhioyev, Yanovskiy, Kobiashvili, Kanishchev, Gakhokidze.

- August 12, 1997 / Second qualifying round, First leg / FC Rotor Volgograd – Odra Wodzisław 2-0 (Niederhaus 72' Veretennikov 86') / Volgograd, Central Stadium / Attendance: 25,000

FC Rotor Volgograd: Zakharchuk, Shmarko, Gerashchenko (captain) (Olenikov, 46), Tishchenko (Krivov, 27), Berketov, Borzenkov, Zubko (Niederhaus, 52), Zernov, Veretennikov, Yesipov, Abramov.

- August 26, 1997 / Second qualifying round, Return leg / FC Dnipro Dnipropetrovsk – FC Alania Vladikavkaz 1-4 (Sharan 24' – Gakhokidze 2' 30' Yanovskiy 33' Kobiashvili 45') / Dnipropetrovsk, Stadium Meteor / Attendance: 8,000

FC Alania Vladikavkaz: Khapov, Pagayev, Avdeev (Agayev, 64), Tskhadadze, Dzhioyev (captain) (Kornienko, 75), Tsveiba, Žutautas, Yanovskiy, Kobiashvili (Datdeyev, 84), Kanishchev, Gakhokidze.

- August 26, 1997 / Second qualifying round, Return leg / Odra Wodzisław – FC Rotor Volgograd (Staniek 35' Zagórski 45' Brzoza 45' – Berketov 5' Abramov 50' (yellow card) 52' (yellow-red card) 58' Veretennikov 68' 72') / Wodzisław Śląski, MOSiR Stadium / Attendance: 8,000

FC Rotor Volgograd: Zakharchuk, Shmarko, Veretennikov, Niederhaus (Burlachenko, 46), Yesipov, Borzenkov, Gerashchenko (captain), Zubko (Zernov, 46), Berketov, Abramov, Olenikov (Krivov, 75).

- September 16, 1997 / First round, First leg / MTK Hungária FC – FC Alania Vladikavkaz 3-0 (Illés 54' Preisinger 71' Lörincz 87' (pen.) – Pagayev (yellow card) 42' (red card) 88') / Budapest, Hidegkuti Nándor Stadium / Attendance: 3,000

FC Alania Vladikavkaz: Khapov, Pagayev, Avdeev (Datdeyev, 57), Kornienko, Dzhioyev (captain), Tsveiba, Žutautas, Yanovskiy, Kobiashvili, Kanishchev (Ashvetia, 76), Gakhokidze.

- September 16, 1997 / First round, First leg / FC Rotor Volgograd – Örebro SK 2-0 (Berketov 45' Veretennikov 64') / Volgograd, Central Stadium / Attendance: 23,000

FC Rotor Volgograd: Zakharchuk, Shmarko, Veretennikov, Zubko (Tishchenko, 64), Yesipov (Krivov, 81), Borzenkov, Gerashchenko (captain), Burlachenko, Berketov, Zhunenko (Zernov, 46), Olenikov.

- September 16, 1997 / First round, First leg / FC Sion – FC Spartak Moscow 0-1 (Kechinov 74' Khlestov (yellow card) 36' (yellow-red card) 86') / Sion, Stade Tourbillon / Attendance: 6,000

FC Spartak Moscow: Filimonov, Gorlukovich (captain), Khlestov, Golovskoy, Ananko, Lutovinov (Buznikin, 66), Robson (Konovalov, 59), Alenichev, Bakharev, Kechinov (Shirko, 75), Tikhonov.

- September 30, 1997 / First round, Return leg / FC Alania Vladikavkaz – MTK Hungária FC 1-1 (Moroz 16' – Halmai 86') / Vladikavkaz, Republican Spartak Stadium / Attendance: 31,000

FC Alania Vladikavkaz: Khapov, Gakhokidze, Avdeev (Bazayev, 75), Kornienko, Dzhioyev (captain), Moroz, Žutautas, Yanovskiy, Datdeyev (Agayev, 46), Kanishchev, Ashvetia (Sikoyev, 55).

- September 30, 1997 / First round, Return leg / Örebro SK – FC Rotor Volgograd 1-4 (E. Karlsson 85' – Niederhaus 25' 67' Zernov 41' Veretennikov 72') / Örebro, Eyravallen / Attendance: 8,000

FC Rotor Volgograd: Zakharchuk, Shmarko, Veretennikov, Niederhaus (Mysin, 78), Smirnov, Zernov (Zubko, 68), Gerashchenko (captain), Burlachenko, Berketov, Abramov, Olenikov (Matiola, 80).

- September 30, 1997 / First round, Return leg / FC Spartak Moscow – FC Sion 2-2 (Shirko 19' Alenichev 54' – Lota 4' 73') / Moscow, Lokomotiv Stadium / Attendance: 12,000

FC Spartak Moscow: Filimonov, Gorlukovich (captain), Ananko, Golovskoy, Romaschenko, Shirko, Buznikin (Robson, 68), Alenichev, Titov, Kechinov, Tikhonov.

The goal in the stadium was measured before the game and turned out to be 2.46 meters high instead of regulation 2.44. The referee decided to play the game anyway. After FC Sion's protest, UEFA decided to replay the return leg.

- October 15, 1997 / First round, Return leg / FC Spartak Moscow – FC Sion 5-1 (Buznikin 5' Titov 34' Kechinov 42' Tikhonov 60' Romaschenko 83' – Camadini 66') / Moscow, Lokomotiv Stadium / Attendance: 24,000

FC Spartak Moscow: Filimonov, Gorlukovich (captain), Ananko (Golovskoy, 84), Evseev, Romaschenko, Shirko (Tsymbalar, 46), Buznikin (Melyoshin, 65), Alenichev, Titov, Kechinov, Tikhonov.

- October 21, 1997 / Second round, First leg / FC Rotor Volgograd – S.S. Lazio 0-0 / Volgograd, Central Stadium / Attendance: 25,000

FC Rotor Volgograd: Zakharchuk, Shmarko, Veretennikov, Niederhaus, Yesipov, Zernov (Zubko, 76), Gerashchenko (captain), Burlachenko (Krivov, 63), Berketov, Abramov (Zhunenko, 81), Olenikov.

- October 21, 1997 / Second round, First leg / FC Spartak Moscow – Real Valladolid 2-0 (Tikhonov 60' Titov 84') / Moscow, Lokomotiv Stadium / Attendance: 10,000

FC Spartak Moscow: Filimonov, Gorlukovich (captain), Golovskoy, Evseev, Romaschenko, Shirko (Lutovinov, 54), Buznikin (Bakharev, 61), Alenichev, Titov, Kechinov, Tikhonov.

- November 4, 1997 / Second round, Return leg / S.S. Lazio – FC Rotor Volgograd 3-0 (Casiraghi 5' Mancini 35' Signori 89') / Rome, Stadio Olimpico / Attendance: 40,000

FC Rotor Volgograd: Zakharchuk, Shmarko, Veretennikov (captain), Niederhaus, Yesipov, Zernov (Zubko, 46), Krivov (Burlachenko, 67), Abramov, Berketov, Zhunenko, Olenikov.

- November 4, 1997 / Real Valladolid – FC Spartak Moscow 1-2 (Juan Carlos 88' – Shirko 64' 90') / Valladolid, Estadio José Zorrilla / Attendance: 16,700

FC Spartak Moscow: Filimonov, Gorlukovich (captain), Ananko, Evseev, Romaschenko, Shirko, Robson (Bakharev, 46), Alenichev, Titov (Lutovinov, 79), Kechinov (Melyoshin, 68), Tikhonov.

- November 25, 1997 / Third round, First leg / Karlsruher SC – FC Spartak Moscow 0-0 (Golovskoy (yellow card) 24' (yellow-red card) 89' / Karlsruhe, Wildparkstadion / Attendance: 15,000

FC Spartak Moscow: Filimonov, Gorlukovich (captain), Ananko, Evseev, Romaschenko, Shirko, Bakharev (Melyoshin, 45), Golovskoy, Titov, Kechinov, Tikhonov.

- December 9, 1997 / Third round, Return leg / FC Spartak Moscow – Karlsruher SC 1-0 (a.e.t.) (Shirko 109') / Moscow, Lokomotiv Stadium / Attendance: 10,000

FC Spartak Moscow: Filimonov, Gorlukovich (captain), Ananko, Khlestov, Romaschenko, Shirko, Buznikin (Robson, 46), Alenichev, Titov, Kechinov (Melyoshin, 22), Tikhonov.

== 1997 UEFA Intertoto Cup ==
FC Dynamo Moscow, FC Torpedo-Luzhniki Moscow and FC Lokomotiv Nizhny Novgorod all won their groups, but were knocked out in the semi-finals.

- June 22, 1997 / Group 12, Day 1 / FC Merani-91 Tbilisi – FC Torpedo-Luzhniki Moscow 0-2 (Gashkin 5' Mashkarin 54') / Tbilisi, Boris Paichadze Stadium / Attendance: 20,000

FC Torpedo-Luzhniki Moscow: Vorobyov, Kornaukhov (Arlowski, 46), Khokhlov, Mashkarin (captain), Makhmutov (Burchenkov, 46), Bushmanov, Avakov (Jankauskas, 71), Kamoltsev, Gashkin, Ražanauskas, Preikšaitis.

- June 28, 1997 / Group 11, Day 2 / FC Lokomotiv Nizhny Novgorod – FK Proleter Zrenjanin 1-0 (Bystrov 90') / Nizhny Novgorod, Lokomotiv Stadium / Attendance: 10,860

FC Lokomotiv Nizhny Novgorod: Satsunkevich, Baltušnikas, Nizhegorodov, Kurayev, Lipko, Kazakov (captain) (Kashentsev, 36), Bystrov, Zubkov, Rapeika, Durnev (Chudin, 54; Perednya, 75), Mukhamadiev.

- June 29, 1997 / Group 5, Day 2 / FC Dynamo Moscow – Panachaiki 2–1 (Shtanyuk 8', Kutsenko 43' – Klejch 11') / Moscow, Dynamo Stadium / Attendance: 3,500

FC Dynamo Moscow: Tiapushkin, Tochilin (Zharinov, 68), Kovtun, Ostrovskiy (Korablyov, 75), Shtanyuk, Kulchiy, Grishin, Skokov (Gusev, 78), Kutsenko, Nekrasov, Teryokhin.

- July 5, 1997 / Group 5, Day 3 / B36 Tórshavn – FC Dynamo Moscow 0–1 (Ostrovskiy 78') / Toftir, Svangaskarð / Attendance: 500

FC Dynamo Moscow: Tiapushkin, Tochilin, Kovtun, Ostrovskiy, Shtanyuk, Kulchiy, Grishin (Tishkov, 7), Skokov, Kutsenko, Nekrasov, Gusev (Kulyov, 57).

- July 5, 1997 / Group 11, Day 3 / Publikum – FC Lokomotiv Nizhny Novgorod 1-2 (Sivko 45' – Duyun 86' Ionanidze 90') / Celje, Skalna Klet / Attendance: 2,000

FC Lokomotiv Nizhny Novgorod: Satsunkevich, Baltušnikas, Nizhegorodov (Kashentsev, 65), Kurayev (captain), Lipko, Ionanidze, Bystrov, Zubkov (Duyun, 50), Rapeika, Durnev, Mukhamadiev (Dzhubanov, 60).

- July 5, 1997 / Group 12, Day 3 / FC Torpedo-Luzhniki Moscow – Iraklis 4-1 (Jankauskas 10' Kamoltsev 54' Khokhlov 65' Preikšaitis 68' – Hantzidis 15') / Moscow, Torpedo Stadium / Attendance: 2,500

FC Torpedo-Luzhniki Moscow: Vorobyov, Arlowski, Khokhlov, Mashkarin (captain), Eguavoen, Bushmanov, Ražanauskas (Kamoltsev, 46), Preikšaitis, Burchenkov (Gashkin, 65), Jankauskas, Carlos Alberto (Makhmutov, 73).

- July 12, 1997 / Group 5, Day 4 / FC Dynamo Moscow – Racing Genk 3–2 (Teryokhin 22' Kulchiy 37' Korablyov 44' – Oularé 27' Keita 48') / Moscow, Dynamo Stadium / Attendance: 3,000

FC Dynamo Moscow: Tiapushkin, Tochilin (Gusev, 38), Kovtun, Ostrovskiy, Korablyov, Kobelev (captain), Zharinov, Kutsenko (Kulyov, 61), Kulchiy, Nekrasov, Teryokhin.

- July 12, 1997 / Group 11, Day 4 / FC Lokomotiv Nizhny Novgorod – Antalyaspor 1-0 (Durnev 13') / Nizhny Novgorod, Lokomotiv Stadium / Attendance: 10,000

FC Lokomotiv Nizhny Novgorod: Satsunkevich, Baltušnikas, Nizhegorodov, Kurayev (captain), Lipko, Ionanidze (Dzhubanov, 40), Bystrov, Zubkov, Rapeika, Durnev (Duyun, 65), Mukhamadiev (Kashentsev, 63).

- July 12, 1997 / Group 12, Day 4 / Floriana F.C. – FC Torpedo-Luzhniki Moscow 0-1 (Botsiyev 44') / Valletta, Victor Tedesco Stadium / Attendance: 1,000

FC Torpedo-Luzhniki Moscow: Vorobyov, Makhmutov, Kornaukhov, Samaroni, Burchenkov (Agashkov, 90), Guzhov (Carlos Alberto, 33), Ražanauskas, Preikšaitis (Gashkin, 46), Koshelyuk, Botsiyev, Kamoltsev (captain).

- July 19, 1997 / Group 5, Day 5 / Stabæk – FC Dynamo Moscow 1–1 (Skistad 77' – Kosolapov 46') / Bærum, Nadderud stadion / Attendance: 2,000

FC Dynamo Moscow: Tiapushkin, Korablyov, Kozlov, Tochilin, Povorov, Zharinov, Likhobabenko, Kulyov, Kutsenko (Gordeyev, 72), Gusev (Sherstnyov, 77), Kosolapov (Artyomov, 65).

- July 19, 1997 / Group 11, Day 5 / Maccabi Haifa F.C. – FC Lokomotiv Nizhny Novgorod 0-4 (Perednya 9' Mordvinov 20' Ionanidze 32' Mukhamadiev 63') / Haifa, Kiryat Eliezer Stadium / Attendance: 200

FC Lokomotiv Nizhny Novgorod: Mikhailov, Zubkov, Oskolkov, Rapeika, Chudin, Kazakov (captain) (Ignatyev, 46), Kashentsev, Mordvinov (Mukhamadiev, 46), Dzhubanov, Perednya, Ionanidze.

- July 19, 1997 / Group 12, Day 5 / FC Torpedo-Luzhniki Moscow – SV Ried 2-0 (Carlos Alberto 8' (pen.) Gashkin 13') / Moscow, Torpedo Stadium / Attendance: 1,500

FC Torpedo-Luzhniki Moscow: Vorobyov, Arlowski (Alomerović, 32), Khokhlov, Mashkarin (captain), Burchenkov, Bushmanov, Preikšaitis, Kamoltsev, Gashkin (Botsiyev, 46), Koshelyuk, Carlos Alberto (Samaroni, 66).

- July 26, 1997 / Semi-finals, First leg / FC Dynamo Moscow – MSV Duisburg 2–2 (Teryokhin 18' 38' – Osthoff 60' Salou 64') / Moscow, Dynamo Stadium / Attendance: 5,000

FC Dynamo Moscow: Tiapushkin, Kutsenko (Kosolapov, 75), Kovtun, Ostrovskiy, Shtanyuk, Kobelev (captain), Zharinov (Tochilin, 66), Skokov, Kulchiy, Nekrasov, Teryokhin.

- July 26, 1997 / Semi-finals, First leg / FC Lokomotiv Nizhny Novgorod – Halmstads BK 0-0 / Nizhny Novgorod, Lokomotiv Stadium / Attendance: 6,900

FC Lokomotiv Nizhny Novgorod: Mikhailov, Baltušnikas, Oskolkov (Zubkov, 75), Duyun, Vlasov, Chudin, Dzhubanov, Kashentsev, Mordvinov, Perednya (Bystrov, 46), Ionanidze (Rapeika, 46).

- July 26, 1997 / Semi-finals, First leg / AJ Auxerre – FC Torpedo-Luzhniki Moscow 3-0 (Goma 44' Diomède 55' Marlet 65') / Auxerre, Stade de l'Abbé-Deschamps / Attendance: 5,000

FC Torpedo-Luzhniki Moscow: Vorobyov, Arlowski (Burchenkov, 83), Khokhlov, Mashkarin (captain), Eguavoen, Alomerović, Kornaukhov, Kamoltsev (Carlos Alberto, 45), Botsiyev, Koshelyuk, Samaroni (Preikšaitis, 76).

- July 30, 1997 / Semi-finals, Return leg / MSV Duisburg – FC Dynamo Moscow 3–1 (Wohlert 10' 12' Gill 89' (pen.) – Kobelev 37' Kovtun (yellow card) 54' (yellow-red card) 60' Teryokhin (yellow card) 82' (yellow-red card) 82') / Duisburg, Wedaustadion / Attendance: 8,650

FC Dynamo Moscow: Tiapushkin, Tochilin (Gusev, 56), Kovtun, Ostrovskiy, Shtanyuk, Kobelev (captain), Kutsenko (Kosolapov, 60), Skokov, Kulchiy, Nekrasov, Teryokhin.

- July 30, 1997 / Semi-finals, Return leg / Halmstads BK – FC Lokomotiv Nizhny Novgorod 1-0 (F. Andersson 24') / Halmstad, Örjans Vall / Attendance: 2,329

FC Lokomotiv Nizhny Novgorod: Satsunkevich, Nizhegorodov, Chudin, Duyun, Lipko, Rapeika, Dzhubanov, Zubkov, Ionanidze, Perednya, Mukhamadiev.

- July 30, 1997 / Semi-finals, Return leg / FC Torpedo-Luzhniki Moscow – AJ Auxerre 4-1 (Gashkin 23' Mashkarin 36' Samaroni 51' Carlos Alberto 88' (pen.) – Guivarc'h 43') / Moscow, Eduard Streltsov Stadium / Attendance: 3,000

FC Torpedo-Luzhniki Moscow: Vorobyov, Arlowski, Khokhlov, Mashkarin (captain), Alomerović (Eguavoen, 71), Bushmanov, Preikšaitis (Botsiyev, 46), Kamoltsev (Carlos Alberto, 69), Gashkin, Koshelyuk, Samaroni.

== National team ==
Russia national football team came second in their qualification group for the 1998 FIFA World Cup. They lost to Italy in the playoffs for the second-placed teams and did not qualify for the World Cup. Boris Ignatyev was the head coach, with Yuri Syomin assisting throughout and Leonid Pakhomov assisting from the third game on.

- February 7, 1997 / Carlsberg Cup / Yugoslavia – Russia 1-1 (Drobnjak 40' Kocić (red card) 90' – Popov 62') / Hong Kong, Hong Kong Stadium / Attendance: 25,430

Russia: Ovchinnikov, Khlestov (Bokov, 78), Tsveiba, Chugainov, Popov, Kharlachyov, Veretennikov (Alenichev, 46), Yanovskiy, Tikhonov (captain), Simutenkov, Kanishchev (Kechinov, 88).

	Penalties
Mihajlović (penalty scored); Savićević (penalty scored); Drobnjak (penalty scored); Ćurčić (penalty scored); Mirković (penalty scored); Govedarica (penalty missed)	5 – 6	(penalty scored) Simutenkov; (penalty scored) Tikhonov; (penalty scored) Alenichev; (penalty scored) Popov; (penalty scored) Bokov; (penalty scored) Kharlachyov

- February 10, 1997 / Carlsberg Cup / Switzerland – Russia 1-2 (Thüler 80' – Simutenkov 23' 26') / Hong Kong, Hong Kong Stadium / Attendance: 20,167

Russia: Cherchesov (captain), Bokov, Chugainov, Tsveiba, Popov, Alenichev, Tsymbalar (Veretennikov, 88), Yanovskiy, Kharlachyov, Gerasimenko (Kanishchev, 77), Simutenkov.

- March 12, 1997 / Friendly / Yugoslavia – Russia 0-0 / Belgrade, Stadion Crvena Zvezda / Attendance: 32,000

Russia: Ovchinnikov, Khlestov, Chugainov, Popov (Kharlachyov, 64), Tetradze, Karpin, Onopko (captain), Kanchelskis (Alenichev, 74), Beschastnykh (Tsveiba, 46; Bokov, 85), Kolyvanov, Simutenkov (Gerasimenko, 86).

- March 29, 1997 / 1998 FIFA World Cup qualifier / Cyprus – Russia 1-1 (Gogić 31' – Simutenkov 33') / Paralimni, Paralimni Stadium / Attendance: 3,199

Russia: Cherchesov, Popov, Chugainov, Tsymbalar (Gerasimenko, 69), Tetradze, Karpin, Onopko (captain), Kanchelskis, Mostovoi, Kolyvanov, Simutenkov.

- April 30, 1997 / 1998 FIFA World Cup qualifier / Russia – Luxembourg 3-0 (Kechinov 20' Grishin 55' Simutenkov 57' – Strasser (red card) 56') / Moscow, Dynamo Stadium / Attendance: 10,000

Russia: Ovchinnikov, Radimov (Zubko, 68), Kovtun, Kosolapov, Tetradze (Popov, 26), Chugainov, Onopko (captain), Alenichev, Beschastnykh (Grishin, 46), Kechinov, Simutenkov.

- June 8, 1997 / 1998 FIFA World Cup qualifier / Russia – Israel 2-0 (Radimov 8' Kosolapov 38') / Moscow, Dynamo Stadium / Attendance: 30,000

Russia: Ovchinnikov, Radimov, Nikiforov, Kosolapov, Yanovskiy, Tsveiba, Onopko (captain), Alenichev, Grishin (Yesipov, 90), Cheryshev (Kovtun, 83), Beschastnykh (Tikhonov, 61).

The next game was officially billed as "Russia All Stars vs. FIFA World XI" and does not count as an official Russian national football team game. It was held to commemorate 100 years anniversary of football in Russia and 850 years anniversary of the founding of Moscow. Uwe Gospodarek, who played in this game, never actually played a game for Germany national football team.

- August 18, 1997 / Friendly / Russia All Stars – FIFA World XI 0-2 (Djorkaeff 55' Guerrero 82') / Moscow, Luzhniki Stadium / Attendance: 62,000

Referee: Pierluigi Collina.
Russia All Stars: Ovchinnikov (Cherchesov, 46), Kovtun (Pagayev, 46), Nikiforov (Chugainov, 46), Popov, Kosolapov (Yanovskiy, 46), Kanchelskis (Grishin, 46), Onopko (captain), Alenichev (Kharlachyov, 46), Kolyvanov (Tikhonov, 46), Veretennikov, Simutenkov (Cheryshev, 46).
FIFA World XI: Zubizarreta (Gospodarek, 46), Vega, Suárez, Verlaat, Matthäus (captain), Djorkaeff (Tsveiba, 78), Guerrero, Winter, Papin (Abédi Pelé, 46), Effenberg, Shevchenko (Beschastnykh, 58).
FIFA World XI coaches: Bobby Robson and Bora Milutinović.

- August 20, 1997 / Friendly / Russia – Yugoslavia 0-1 (Beschastnykh (red card) 69' – Jokanović 87' (pen.)) / St. Petersburg, Petrovsky Stadium / Attendance: 9,000

Russia: Cherchesov (Ovchinnikov, 46), Tsveiba, Nikiforov, Yanovskiy, Kosolapov (Tikhonov, 46), Kanchelskis (Beschastnykh, 46), Onopko (captain), Alenichev, Kolyvanov (Grishin, 62), Khlestov (Kovtun, 62), Cheryshev (Simutenkov, 46).

- September 10, 1997 / 1998 FIFA World Cup qualifier / Bulgaria – Russia 1-0 (Ivanov 56') / Sofia, Vasil Levski National Stadium / Attendance: 55,000

Russia: Ovchinnikov, Kovtun, Nikiforov, Kosolapov (Khokhlov, 46), Yanovskiy, Tsveiba, Onopko (captain), Kanchelskis, Alenichev, Kolyvanov, Simutenkov (Cheryshev, 76).

- October 11, 1997 / 1998 FIFA World Cup qualifier / Russia – Bulgaria 4-2 (Alenichev 14' 57' Kolyvanov 41' (pen.) Yuran 52' (pen.) – Gruev 68' Kostadinov 78') / Moscow, Luzhniki Stadium / Attendance: 21,000

Russia: Ovchinnikov, Popov, Chugainov, Tsveiba, Yanovskiy, Tikhonov, Onopko (captain), Alenichev (Kosolapov, 82), Yuran (Veretennikov, 67), Kolyvanov, Simutenkov (Radimov, 46).

- October 29, 1997 / 1998 FIFA World Cup qualifier, play-off first leg / Russia – Italy 1-1 (Cannavaro 52' (o.g.) – Vieri 50') / Moscow, Dynamo Stadium / Attendance: 20,000

Russia: Ovchinnikov, Radimov, Chugainov, Popov (Tikhonov, 78), Yanovskiy, Kovtun, Onopko (captain) (Tsveiba, 43), Alenichev, Yuran, Kolyvanov, Kanchelskis (Khokhlov, 46).

- November 15, 1997 / 1998 FIFA World Cup qualifier, play-off return leg / Italy – Russia / 1-0 (Casiraghi 53') / Naples, Stadio San Paolo / Attendance: 76,500

Russia: Ovchinnikov, Kovtun, Nikiforov, Onopko (captain), Popov, Radimov (Semak, 66), Khokhlov, Yanovskiy (Simutenkov, 60), Alenichev, Yuran (Beschastnykh, 79), Kolyvanov.
