= 1998 Commonwealth of Independent States Cup =

CIS Cup, Кубок Содружества 1998

Tournament details
- Host country: Russia
- Dates: 24 January – 1 February 1998
- Teams: 16
- Venue: 2 (in 1 host city)

Final positions
- Champions: (Ukraine) Dynamo Kyiv (3rd title)

Tournament statistics
- Matches played: 31
- Goals scored: 136 (4.39 per match)
- Top scorer(s): (Russia) Anatoli Kanishchev (9 goals)

The 1998 Commonwealth of Independent States Cup was the sixth edition of the competition between the champions of former republics of Soviet Union. It was won by Dynamo Kyiv for the third time in a row.

== Participants ==
| Team | Qualification | Participation |
|---|---|---|
| (Russia) Spartak Moscow | 1997 Russian Top League champions | 5th |
| (Ukraine) Dynamo Kyiv | 1996–97 Vyshcha Liha champions | 3rd |
| (Belarus) Dinamo Minsk | 1997 Belarusian Premier League champions | 4th |
| (Lithuania) Kareda Šiauliai | 1996–97 A Lyga champions | 2nd |
| (Latvia) Skonto Riga | 1997 Latvian Higher League champions | 6th |
| (Estonia) Tulevik Viljandi | 1997–98 Meistriliiga 3rd team as of winter break ^{1} | 1st |
| (Moldova) Constructorul Chișinău | 1996–97 Moldovan National Division champions | 1st |
| (Georgia (country)) Dinamo Tbilisi | 1996–97 Umaglesi Liga champions | 6th |
| (Azerbaijan) Kapaz Ganja | 1997–98 Azerbaijan Top League 1st team as of winter break ^{2} | 2nd |
| (Armenia) Yerevan | 1997 Armenian Premier League champions | 1st |
| (Kazakhstan) Irtysh Pavlodar | 1997 Kazakhstan Premier League champions | 2nd |
| (Uzbekistan) MHSK Tashkent | 1997 Uzbek League champions | 1st |
| (Tajikistan) Vakhsh Qurghonteppa | 1997 Tajik League champions | 1st |
| (Kyrgyzstan) Dinamo Bishkek | 1997 Kyrgyzstan League champions | 1st |
| (Turkmenistan) Köpetdag Aşgabat | 1997–98 Ýokary Liga 1st team as of winter break | 6th |
| Russia U21 | Unofficial entry, not eligible to advance past group stage | 4th |

- ^{1} Tulevik Viljandi participated as a farm club of Flora Tallinn (1997–98 season 1st team as of the winter break), after both Flora and Lantana Tallinn (1996–97 Estonian champions) withdrew.
- ^{2} Kapaz Ganja replaced Neftchi Baku (1996–97 Azerbaijan champions).

== Group stage ==
=== Group A ===
| Team | Pld | W | D | L | GF | GA | GD | Pts |
|---|---|---|---|---|---|---|---|---|
| (Russia) Spartak Moscow | 3 | 3 | 0 | 0 | 30 | 2 | +28 | 9 |
| (Belarus) Dinamo Minsk | 3 | 2 | 0 | 1 | 7 | 9 | −2 | 6 |
| (Armenia) Yerevan | 3 | 1 | 0 | 2 | 7 | 5 | +2 | 3 |
| (Tajikistan) Vakhsh Qurghonteppa | 3 | 0 | 0 | 3 | 1 | 29 | −28 | 0 |

==== Results ====
24 January 1998
12:00

| Vakhsh Qurghonteppa (Tajikistan) | 0 – 6 | (Armenia) Yerevan |
|---|---|---|
| | | Sahakyan 14', 19'; R.Grigoryan 28', 49'; Ter-Petrosyan 39'; Yesayan 65' |

Spartak Manege, Moscow
Attendance: 300
Referee: Andrei Iacovlev (Moldova)
24 January 1998
18:00

| Spartak Moscow (Russia) | 8 – 1 | (Belarus) Dinamo Minsk |
|---|---|---|
| Kanishchev 17', 29', 65', 85'; Gorlukovich 22'; Romaschenko 38' (pen.); Kechinov 57'; Titov 69' | | Podrez 9' (pen.) |

CSKA Palace of Sports, Moscow
Attendance: 4,500
Referee: Slavik Kazaryan (Armenia)

25 January 1998
12:00

| Yerevan (Armenia) | 0 – 2 | (Belarus) Dinamo Minsk |
|---|---|---|
| | | Osipovich 80'; Charnyawski 89' |

Spartak Manege, Moscow
Attendance: 700
Referee: Kurmanbek Ordabaev (Kazakhstan)
25 January 1998
18:00

| Spartak Moscow (Russia) | 19 – 0 | (Tajikistan) Vakhsh Qurghonteppa |
|---|---|---|
| Kanishchev 9', 12', 13', 45'; Shirko 22', 30'; Titov 30', 73'; Tikhonov 32'; Romaschenko 42'; Alenichev 43'; Kechinov 50', 56', 74'; Robson 61', 71', 75', 76', 87' |

CSKA Palace of Sports, Moscow
Attendance: 4,090
Referee: Oleg Timofejev (Estonia)

27 January 1998
18:00

| Dinamo Minsk (Belarus) | 4 – 1 | (Tajikistan) Vakhsh Qurghonteppa |
|---|---|---|
| Podrez 62', 72'; Charnyawski 83', 85' | | R.Galiakbarov 73' |

Spartak Manege, Moscow
Attendance: 150
Referee: Andrei Iacovlev (Moldova)
27 January 1998
18:00

| Yerevan (Armenia) | 1 – 3 | (Russia) Spartak Moscow |
|---|---|---|
| Karapetyan 80' | | Kechinov 55', 88'; Melyoshin 90' |

CSKA Palace of Sports, Moscow
Attendance: 4,500
Referee: Romāns Lajuks (Latvia)

=== Group B ===
- Unofficial table

| Team | Pld | W | D | L | GF | GA | GD | Pts |
|---|---|---|---|---|---|---|---|---|
| (Turkmenistan) Köpetdag Aşgabat | 3 | 2 | 1 | 0 | 5 | 0 | +5 | 7 |
| Russia U21 | 3 | 1 | 2 | 0 | 2 | 0 | +2 | 5 |
| (Lithuania) Kareda Šiauliai | 3 | 1 | 1 | 1 | 3 | 3 | 0 | 4 |
| (Moldova) Constructorul Chișinău | 3 | 0 | 0 | 3 | 1 | 8 | −7 | 0 |

- Official table

| Team | Pld | W | D | L | GF | GA | GD | Pts |
|---|---|---|---|---|---|---|---|---|
| (Turkmenistan) Köpetdag Aşgabat | 2 | 2 | 0 | 0 | 5 | 0 | +5 | 6 |
| (Lithuania) Kareda Šiauliai | 2 | 1 | 0 | 1 | 3 | 3 | 0 | 3 |
| (Moldova) Constructorul Chișinău | 2 | 0 | 0 | 2 | 1 | 6 | −5 | 0 |

==== Results ====
24 January 1998
14:00

| Russia U21 | 2 – 0 | (Moldova) Constructorul Chișinău |
|---|---|---|
| Krivov 35'; Bakharev 66' |

CSKA Palace of Sports, Moscow
Attendance: 1,500
Referee: Romāns Lajuks (Latvia)
24 January 1998
14:00

| Köpetdag Aşgabat (Turkmenistan) | 2 – 0 | (Lithuania) Kareda Šiauliai |
|---|---|---|
| Annadurdiyew 17'; Kulyýew 85' |

Spartak Manege, Moscow
Attendance: 350
Referee: Andrei Butenko (Russia)

25 January 1998
12:00

| Köpetdag Aşgabat (Turkmenistan) | 0 – 0 | Russia U21 |

CSKA Palace of Sports, Moscow
Attendance: 800
Referee: Serhiy Tatulian (Ukraine)
25 January 1998
14:00

| Constructorul Chișinău (Moldova) | 1 – 3 | (Lithuania) Kareda Šiauliai |
|---|---|---|
| Berezka 3' | | Gražiūnas 8'; Dančenka 28'; Pocius 87' |

Spartak Manege, Moscow
Attendance: 100
Referee: Khagani Mamedov (Azerbaijan)

27 January 1998
12:00

| Constructorul Chișinău (Moldova) | 0 – 3 | (Turkmenistan) Köpetdag Aşgabat |
|---|---|---|
| | | Annadurdiyew 3'; Ç.Muhadow 15'; Khachatryan 32' |

CSKA Palace of Sports, Moscow
Attendance: 200
Referee: Slavik Kazaryan (Armenia)
27 January 1998
12:00

| Kareda Šiauliai (Lithuania) | 0 – 0 | Russia U21 |

Spartak Manege, Moscow
Attendance: 100
Referee: Viktor Kolpakov (Kyrgyzstan)

=== Group С ===
| Team | Pld | W | D | L | GF | GA | GD | Pts |
|---|---|---|---|---|---|---|---|---|
| (Ukraine) Dynamo Kyiv | 3 | 3 | 0 | 0 | 12 | 0 | +12 | 9 |
| (Azerbaijan) Kapaz Ganja | 3 | 1 | 1 | 1 | 5 | 9 | −4 | 4 |
| (Uzbekistan) MHSK Tashkent | 3 | 1 | 0 | 2 | 3 | 7 | −4 | 3 |
| (Estonia) Tulevik Viljandi | 3 | 0 | 1 | 2 | 3 | 7 | −4 | 1 |

==== Results ====
24 January 1998
12:00

| Kapaz Ganja (Azerbaijan) | 2 – 2 | (Estonia) Tulevik Viljandi |
|---|---|---|
| Kvaratskhelia 13', 29' | | Rajala 15'; O'Konnel-Bronin 69' |

CSKA Palace of Sports, Moscow
Attendance: 1,000
Referee: Sergey Shmolik (Belarus)
24 January 1998
16:00

| Dynamo Kyiv (Ukraine) | 3 – 0 | (Uzbekistan) MHSK Tashkent |
|---|---|---|
| Husin 44'; Kardash 45'; Rebrov 50' |

CSKA Palace of Sports, Moscow
Attendance: 4,000
Referee: Sergei Khusainov (Russia)

25 January 1998
16:00

| Tulevik Viljandi (Estonia) | 1 – 2 | (Uzbekistan) MHSK Tashkent |
|---|---|---|
| O'Konnel-Bronin 84' | | Usmankhojaev 8'; Ashurmatov 60' |

Spartak Manege, Moscow
Attendance: 200
Referee: Viktor Kolpakov (Kyrgyzstan)
25 January 1998
16:00

| Dynamo Kyiv (Ukraine) | 6 – 0 | (Azerbaijan) Kapaz Ganja |
|---|---|---|
| Byalkevich 42'; Shevchenko 48', 67'; Rebrov 55', 89'; Kalitvintsev 80' |

CSKA Palace of Sports, Moscow
Attendance: 3,500
Referee: Romāns Lajuks (Latvia)

27 January 1998
16:00

| MHSK Tashkent (Uzbekistan) | 1 – 3 | (Azerbaijan) Kapaz Ganja |
|---|---|---|
| Khabibullin 9' | | Jabbarov 36' (pen.), 41'; Kvaratskhelia 56' |

Spartak Manege, Moscow
Attendance: 350
Referee: Eldar Ramazanov (Turkmenistan)
27 January 1998
16:00

| Tulevik Viljandi (Estonia) | 0 – 3 | (Ukraine) Dynamo Kyiv |
|---|---|---|
| | | Gerasimenko 21', 71'; Leonenko 83' |

CSKA Palace of Sports, Moscow
Attendance: 3,000
Referee: Valentin Ivanov (Russia)

=== Group D ===
| Team | Pld | W | D | L | GF | GA | GD | Pts |
|---|---|---|---|---|---|---|---|---|
| (Latvia) Skonto Riga | 3 | 3 | 0 | 0 | 13 | 0 | +13 | 9 |
| (Georgia (country)) Dinamo Tbilisi | 3 | 2 | 0 | 1 | 10 | 4 | +6 | 6 |
| (Kazakhstan) Irtysh Pavlodar | 3 | 1 | 0 | 2 | 6 | 8 | −2 | 3 |
| (Kyrgyzstan) Dinamo Bishkek | 3 | 0 | 0 | 3 | 2 | 19 | −17 | 0 |

==== Results ====
24 January 1998
16:00

| Skonto Riga (Latvia) | 3 – 0 | (Kazakhstan) Irtysh Pavlodar |
|---|---|---|
| Miholaps 39'; Pahars 85', 89' |

Spartak Manege, Moscow
Attendance: 300
Referee: Tamaz Latsabidze (Georgia)
24 January 1998
18:00

| Dinamo Bishkek (Kyrgyzstan) | 0 – 7 | (Georgia (country)) Dinamo Tbilisi |
|---|---|---|
| | | Khomeriki 7', 23'; Ashvetia 20'; Gogoberishvili 45'; Sardarov 60' (o.g.); Tsitaishvili 83'; Petriashvili 87' |

Spartak Manege, Moscow
Attendance: 350
Referee: Rashid Aytekov (Uzbekistan)

25 January 1998
14:00

| Dinamo Tbilisi (Georgia (country)) | 3 – 2 | (Kazakhstan) Irtysh Pavlodar |
|---|---|---|
| Ashvetia 18'; Khomeriki 28'; Petriashvili 75' | | Kitsak 8'; Kucheryavykh 43' |

CSKA Palace of Sports, Moscow
Attendance: 2,000
Referee: Valentin Ivanov (Russia)
25 January 1998
18:00

| Skonto Riga (Latvia) | 8 – 0 | (Kyrgyzstan) Dinamo Bishkek |
|---|---|---|
| Štolcers 22' (pen.), 62'; Bleidelis 25'; Miholaps 29'; Astafjevs 35', 86'; Pahars 40'; Rekhviashvili 71' |

Spartak Manege, Moscow
Attendance: 100
Referee: Yuri Baskakov (Russia)

27 January 1998
14:00

| Irtysh Pavlodar (Kazakhstan) | 4 – 2 | (Kyrgyzstan) Dinamo Bishkek |
|---|---|---|
| Kucheryavykh 13', 67'; Kitsak 36'; Kalabukhin 40' | | Mirzaliev 23', 81' |

Spartak Manege, Moscow
Attendance: 125
Referee: Tamaz Latsabidze (Georgia)
27 January 1998
14:00

| Dinamo Tbilisi (Georgia (country)) | 0 – 2 | (Latvia) Skonto Riga |
|---|---|---|
| | | Štolcers 6'; Solovyov 77' (pen.) |

CSKA Palace of Sports, Moscow
Attendance: 2,500
Referee: Serhiy Tatulian (Ukraine)

== Final rounds ==
Quarter-finals (28 Jan)
(Ukraine) | Dynamo Kyiv | 1
(Georgia (country)) | Dinamo Tbilisi | 0
(Turkmenistan) | Köpetdag Aşgabat | 7
(Belarus) | Dinamo Minsk | 1
(Russia) | Spartak Moscow | 3
(Lithuania) | Kareda Šiauliai | 0
(Latvia) | Skonto Riga | 3
(Azerbaijan) | Kapaz Ganja | 2

Semi-finals (30 Jan)
(Ukraine) | Dynamo Kyiv | 5
(Turkmenistan) | Köpetdag Aşgabat | 0
(Russia) | Spartak Moscow | 2
(Latvia) | Skonto Riga | 1

Final (1 Feb)
(Ukraine) | Dynamo Kyiv | 1
(Russia) | Spartak Moscow | 0

=== Quarterfinals ===
28 January 1998
15:30

| Dynamo Kyiv (Ukraine) | 1 – 0 | (Georgia (country)) Dinamo Tbilisi |
|---|---|---|
| Husin 3' |

CSKA Palace of Sports, Moscow
Attendance: 4,000
Referee: Oleg Timofejev (Estonia)
28 January 1998
15:30

| Köpetdag Aşgabat (Turkmenistan) | 7 – 1 | (Belarus) Dinamo Minsk |
|---|---|---|
| Ç.Muhadow 15', 70'; R.Muhadow 44'; Broshin 71'; Magdiýew 81'; Durdyýew 85'; Khachatryan 89' | | Kavalchuk 60' |

Spartak Manege, Moscow
Attendance: 400
Referee: Yuri Baskakov (Russia)
28 January 1998
18:00

| Spartak Moscow (Russia) | 3 – 0 | (Lithuania) Kareda Šiauliai |
|---|---|---|
| Titov 57'; Tikhonov 83'; Kanishchev 90' |

CSKA Palace of Sports, Moscow
Attendance: 4,000
Referee: Khagani Mamedov (Azerbaijan)
28 January 1998
18:00

| Skonto Riga (Latvia) | 3 – 2 | (Azerbaijan) Kapaz Ganja |
|---|---|---|
| Miholaps 3'; Štolcers 31'; Pahars 56' | | Kvaratskhelia 43'; Süleymanov 48' |

Spartak Manege, Moscow
Attendance: 300
Referee: Sergei Khusainov (Russia)

=== Semifinals ===
30 January 1998
15:00

| Dynamo Kyiv (Ukraine) | 5 – 0 | (Turkmenistan) Köpetdag Aşgabat |
|---|---|---|
| Gerasimenko 10'; Shevchenko 15'; Byalkevich 24'; Kurbanmämmedow 55' (o.g.); Dmytrulin 59' |

CSKA Palace of Sports, Moscow
Attendance: 4,000
Referee: Andrei Butenko (Russia)
30 January 1998
18:00

| Spartak Moscow (Russia) | 2 – 1 | (Latvia) Skonto Riga |
|---|---|---|
| Shirko 21'; Titov 84' | | Štolcers 34' |

CSKA Palace of Sports, Moscow
Attendance: 4,500
Referee: Andrei Iacovlev (Moldova)

=== Final ===
1 February 1998
14:00

| Dynamo Kyiv (Ukraine) | 1 – 0 | (Russia) Spartak Moscow |
|---|---|---|
| Kaladze 46' |

CSKA Palace of Sports, Moscow
Attendance: 4,500
Referee: Slavik Kazaryan (Armenia)

== Top scorers ==
| Rank | Player | Team | Goals |
|---|---|---|---|
| 1 | (Russia) Anatoli Kanishchev | (Russia) Spartak Moscow | 9 |
| 2 | (Russia) Valery Kechinov | (Russia) Spartak Moscow | 6 |
| 3 | (Russia) Yegor Titov | (Russia) Spartak Moscow | 5 |
| 3 | (Brazil) Luis Robson | (Russia) Spartak Moscow | 5 |
| 3 | (Latvia) Andrejs Štolcers | (Latvia) Skonto Riga | 5 |
| 6 | (Georgia (country)) Badri Kvaratskhelia | (Azerbaijan) Kapaz Ganja | 4 |
| 6 | (Latvia) Marians Pahars | (Latvia) Skonto Riga | 4 |
