= Kashentsev =

Kashentsev (masculine, Russian: Кашенцев) or Kashentseva (feminine, Russian: Кашенцева) is a Russian surname. Notable people with the surname include:

- Nikolai Kashentsev (born 1974), Russian soccer player
- Yevgeni Kashentsev (born 1971), Belarusian soccer player
