= Herashchenko =

Herashchenko is a surname. Notable people with the surname include:

- Anton Herashchenko (born 1979), Ukrainian politician
- Iryna Herashchenko (athlete) (born 1995), Ukrainian high jumper
- Iryna Herashchenko (politician) (born 1971), Ukrainian politician
- Volodymyr Herashchenko (born 1968), Ukrainian football player and coach
