= Alomerović =

Alomerović is a Bosnian surname, derived from the Arabic family name "al-Omari". It may refer to:

- Fikret Alomerović (born 1970), Macedonian footballer
- Kemal Alomerović (born 1980), Macedonian footballer
- Zlatan Alomerović (born 1991), German footballer
