= Skokov =

Skokov (masculine, Russian: Скоков) or Skokova (feminine, Russian: Скокова) is a Russian surname. Notable people with the surname include:

- Vladimir Skokov (born 1972), Russian soccer coach and former player
- Yuliya Skokova (born 1982), Russian speed skater
- Yury Skokov (1938–2013), Russian politician
