= Andrei Gashkin =

Russian footballer

Personal information
- Full name: Andrei Aleksandrovich Gashkin
- Date of birth: 6 December 1970 (age 55)
- Place of birth: Taldom, Russian SFSR
- Height: 1.78 m (5 ft 10 in)
- Position: Midfielder

Senior career*
| Years | Team | Apps | (Gls) |
| 1988 | FC Torpedo Vladimir | 17 | (0) |
| 1989 | FC Torpedo Naberezhnye Chelny | 11 | (0) |
| 1991 | FC Saturn Ramenskoye | 42 | (12) |
| 1992 | FC Znamya Truda Orekhovo-Zuyevo | 35 | (15) |
| 1993 | FC Spartak Moscow | 11 | (0) |
| 1993–1994 | FC Nyva Ternopil | 16 | (4) |
| 1994–1996 | FC Chornomorets Odesa | 51 | (13) |
| 1996 | PFC CSKA Moscow | 16 | (1) |
| 1997–2001 | FC Torpedo Moscow | 143 | (19) |
| 1998 | → FC Torpedo-2 | 1 | (0) |
| 2002 | FC Uralan Elista | 17 | (1) |

Managerial career
- 2006: FC Torpedo Moscow (reserves assistant)
- * Club domestic league appearances and goals

Andrei Aleksandrovich Gashkin (Russian: Андрей Александрович Гашкин; born 6 December 1970) is a former Russian professional footballer and a current coach.

== Club career ==
He made his debut in the Russian Premier League in 1993 for FC Spartak Moscow.

== Honours ==
- Russian Premier League champion: 1993.
- Russian Premier League bronze: 2000.
- Ukrainian Premier League runner-up: 1995, 1996.

== European club competitions ==
- European Cup Winners' Cup 1992–93 for FC Spartak Moscow: 2 games.
- UEFA Cup 1996–97 with PFC CSKA Moscow: 2 games.
- UEFA Intertoto Cup 1997 with FC Torpedo Moscow: 5 games, 3 goals.
- UEFA Cup 2000–01 with FC Torpedo Moscow: 2 games, 1 goal.
- UEFA Cup 2001–02 with FC Torpedo Moscow: 1 game.
