= Vitali Kulyov =

Russian footballer

Personal information
- Full name: Vitali Borisovich Kulyov
- Date of birth: 20 January 1976 (age 50)
- Place of birth: Moscow, Russian SFSR
- Height: 1.86 m (6 ft 1 in)
- Position: Midfielder

Youth career
- FC Dynamo-3 Moscow
- FC Lokomotiv-2 Moscow

Senior career*
Years	Team	Apps	(Gls)
1994	FC Tekhinvest-M Moskovsky	11	(0)
1995	FC Avtomobilist Noginsk	40	(1)
1996–1998	FC Dynamo Moscow	19	(0)
1996–1998	→ FC Dynamo-2 Moscow	60	(0)
1999–2000	FC Lotto-MKM Moscow	29	(1)
2001	FC Fakel Voronezh	12	(2)
2002	FC Dynamo-SPb St. Petersburg	4	(0)
2002	FC Kristall Smolensk	7	(0)
2003	FC Terek Grozny	3	(0)
2003	FC Volgar-Gazprom Astrakhan	21	(0)
2004–2005	FC Khimki	12	(0)
2006–2007	FC Spartak Shchyolkovo	53	(1)
2012	FC Troitsk (amateur)		

Managerial career
- 2015–2017: Academy FC Khimki
- 2017–2019: Academy FC Spartak Moscow
- 2019–2022: Academy FC Khimki
- 2022: FC Torpedo-2 (assistant)
- 2022: FC Torpedo-2 (caretaker)
- 2022–2023: FC Torpedo-2 (assistant)
- * Club domestic league appearances and goals

Vitali Borisovich Kulyov (Russian: Виталий Борисович Кулёв; born 20 January 1976) is a Russian professional football coach and a former player.

== Club career ==
He made his professional debut in the Russian First Division in 1994 for FC Tekhinvest-M Moskovsky. He played 3 games in the UEFA Intertoto Cup 1997 for FC Dynamo Moscow.

== Honours ==
- Russian Premier League bronze: 1997.
- Russian Cup finalist: 1997.
