= Valeriy Vorobyov =

Ukrainian footballer

Personal information
- Full name: Valeriy Oleksandrovych Vorobyov
- Date of birth: 14 January 1970 (age 56)
- Place of birth: Dnipropetrovsk, Ukrainian SSR, Soviet Union
- Height: 1.86 m (6 ft 1 in)
- Position: Goalkeeper

Youth career
- Shakhtar Pavlohrad

Senior career*
Years	Team	Apps	(Gls)
- Shakhtar Pavlohrad
1988–1989	Dnipro Dnipropetrovsk	0	(0)
1990–1991	Vorskla Poltava	50	(0)
1992–1994	Kryvbas Kryvyi Rih	77	(0)
1994	Dynamo Kyiv	7	(0)
1995	CSKA-Borysfen	3	(0)
1995–1997	Kryvbas Kryvyi Rih	47	(0)
1997–2003	Torpedo Moscow	119	(0)
1997–2000	Torpedo-2	16	(0)
Total		303	(0)

International career^{‡}
1994–1999	Ukraine	6	(0)
- * Club domestic league appearances and goals as of 23 June 2007 ‡ National team caps and goals as of 25 March 2007

Valeriy Oleksandrovych Vorobyov (born 14 January 1970) is a Ukrainian former professional football player. For several years since 1997 when he joined FC Torpedo Moscow he played in Russia where he later ended his playing career. Before that he played for Dynamo Kyiv, FC Arsenal Kyiv, FC Vorskla Poltava, FC Kryvbas Kryvyi Rih, FC Dnipro Dnipropetrovsk, and FC Shakhtar Pavlohrad.

== Honours ==
- Ukrainian Premier League champion: 1995.
- Russian Premier League bronze: 2000.

== European club competitions ==
With FC Torpedo Moscow.

- 1997 UEFA Intertoto Cup: 6 games.
- 2000–01 UEFA Cup: 1 game.
- 2003–04 UEFA Cup: 2 games.
