= Igor Chugainov =

Russian footballer

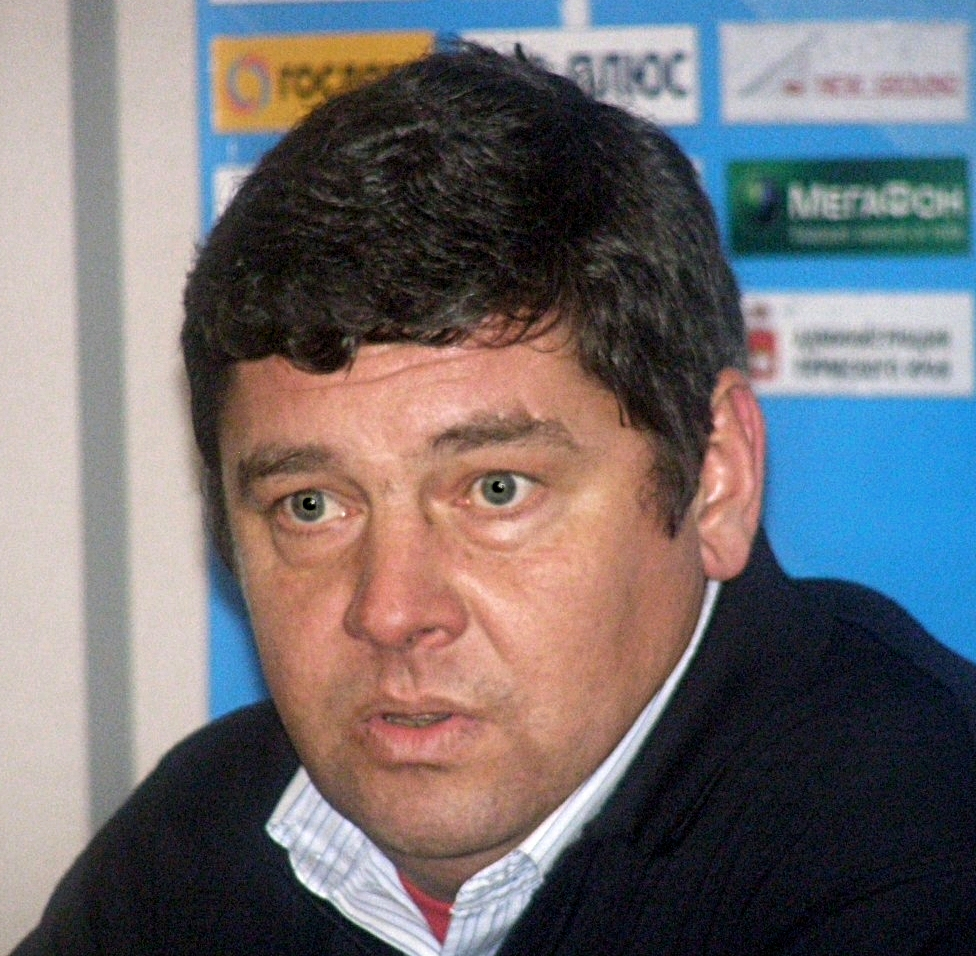
- Chugainov in 2009

Personal information
- Full name: Igor Valeryevich Chugainov
- Date of birth: 6 April 1970 (age 56)
- Place of birth: Moscow, Soviet Union
- Height: 1.87 m (6 ft 1 1/2 in)
- Position: Centre-back

Team information
- Current team: Chertanovo Academy (U17 manager)

Youth career
- SDYuShOR-3
- Torpedo Moscow

Senior career*
Years	Team	Apps	(Gls)
1986–1989	Torpedo Moscow	3	(0)
1990	Lokomotiv Moscow	36	(7)
1991–1993	Torpedo Moscow	84	(15)
1992–1993	Torpedo-d Moscow	7	(1)
1994–2001	Lokomotiv Moscow	234	(19)
1994	Lokomotiv-d Moscow	4	(0)
2002	Uralan Elista	27	(2)

International career
1992	CIS	4	(0)
1992–2002	Russia	26	(0)

Managerial career
- 2006–2007: Zenit St. Petersburg (reserves)
- 2009: Khimki (assistant)
- 2009: Khimki (caretaker)
- 2010: Torpedo Moscow (assistant)
- 2010–2012: Torpedo Moscow
- 2012–2015: Sokol Saratov
- 2017: Spartak Nalchik (assistant)
- 2017–2018: Avangard Kursk (assistant)
- 2018–2019: Sibir Novosibirsk
- 2019: Novosibirsk
- 2024–: Chertanovo Academy (U17)
- * Club domestic league appearances and goals

Igor Valeryevich Chugainov (Russian: Игорь Валерьевич Чугайнов; born 6 April 1970) is a Russian football coach and a former defender. He is the manager of the Under-17 squad of Chertanovo Academy.

== Club career ==
Chugainov developed in the youth academy of Torpedo Moscow in Moscow, joining the first team in 1987 and beginning his professional career. In 1990, he moved to Lokomotiv Moscow, where he played in the Soviet Top League. He returned to Torpedo the following year and remained there until 1993.

In 1994, Chugainov rejoined Lokomotiv Moscow, where he established himself as a key defender and team captain. He became one of the club's prominent players from the late 1990s to the early 2000s, winning the Russian Cup in 1996, 1997, 2000 and 2001. He was also included in the list of the 33 best players of the Russian league for eight consecutive years, from 1994 to 2001.

In 2002, he joined Uralan Elista, making 27 appearances and scoring two goals in the Russian top division. He retired from professional football later that year.

== International career ==
In January 1992, Chugainov was called up to the Commonwealth of Independent States national team and made his debut in a match against the United States. He made a total of four appearances for the team by February of that year. He subsequently represented the Russia national team, making his debut for Russia in February 1996 against Iceland.

Chugainov played as a defender for Russia during the 1998 FIFA World Cup qualification and the UEFA Euro 2000 qualifiers. He made four appearances in the 1998 World Cup qualifying campaign, but Russia failed to qualify for the tournament. He subsequently made one appearance in the UEFA Euro 2000 qualifiers.

He later represented Russia during the 2002 FIFA World Cup qualification and was included in the final squad for the 2002 FIFA World Cup. However, he did not make an appearance during the tournament.

Chugainov made his final international appearance in a friendly match against Belarus in May 2002, bringing his international career to an end.

== Managerial career ==
In 2006, Chugainov worked as a scout for Zenit Saint Petersburg and, later that year, was appointed manager of the club's reserve team, a position he held until 2007. In late 2008, he became manager of Khimki's reserve team and was appointed caretaker manager of the first team of Khimki in 2009. In 2010, he joined Torpedo Moscow as a coach before being promoted to manager, leading the club until 2012.

In June 2012, Chugainov was appointed manager of Sokol Saratov, where he remained until 2015. In 2017, he joined the coaching staff of Spartak Nalchik. Later that year, he moved to Avangard Kursk as assistant manager, remaining in the position until 2018.

In September 2018, Chugainov was appointed manager of Sibir Novosibirsk, leading the club until June 2019. He subsequently managed FC Novosibirsk, remaining in charge until the end of 2019. In 2020, he coached amateur football team 2DROTS and later worked with youth and amateur teams at Krasnogvardeyets in Moscow.

In 2024, Chugainov took charge of a youth team at Chertanovo Academy. In 2026, he was serving as manager of the academy's under-17 team.

== Honours ==
- Russian Cup

Winner (5): 1993, 1996, 1997, 2000, 2001
