= Sergei Burchenkov =

Russian footballer

Personal information
- Full name: Sergei Nikolayevich Burchenkov
- Date of birth: 24 July 1977 (age 49)
- Place of birth: Moscow, Russian SFSR
- Height: 1.81 m (5 ft 11 1/2 in)
- Position: Defender

Senior career*
Years	Team	Apps	(Gls)
1994–1997	FC Torpedo-Luzhniki-d Moscow	108	(1)
1996–2000	FC Torpedo Moscow	70	(1)
1999–2000	→ FC Torpedo-2	27	(0)
2001–2002	FC Uralan Elista	26	(0)
2004–2005	FC Oryol	28	(0)
2006–2007	FC Avangard Kursk	63	(1)
2008	FC Dynamo-Voronezh Voronezh	21	(0)
2009	FC Torpedo Vladimir	3	(0)

International career
1998–1999	Russia U-21	15	(0)
- * Club domestic league appearances and goals

Sergei Nikolayevich Burchenkov (Russian: Серге́й Николаевич Бурченков; born 24 July 1977) is a Russian former professional footballer.

== Club career ==
Burchenkov made his debut in the Russian Premier League in 1996 for FC Torpedo-Luzhniki Moscow.

== Honours ==
- Russian Premier League bronze: 2000.

== European competition history ==
- UEFA Cup 1996–97 with FC Torpedo-Luzhniki Moscow: 3 games.
- UEFA Intertoto Cup 1997 with FC Torpedo-Luzhniki Moscow: 5 games.
