= Marcel Peeper =

Dutch footballer (born 1965)

Personal information
- Full name: Marcel Benjamin Peeper
- Date of birth: 9 September 1965 (age 61)
- Place of birth: Amsterdam, Netherlands
- Position: Wingback

Youth career
- Ajax

Senior career*
Years	Team	Apps	(Gls)
1985–1989	Haarlem	115	(9)
1989–1992	Twente	36	(1)
1993	Sparta Rotterdam	11	(0)
1993–1997	Lokeren	132	(19)
1997–1999	Groningen	39	(0)
1999–2000	Wuppertaler SV	5	(0)
Total		333	(29)

International career
1990	Netherlands	1	(0)
- * Club domestic league appearances and goals

Marcel Benjamin Peeper (born 9 September 1965) is a Dutch former footballer who played as either a left back or left midfielder.

During his career, marred by a serious injury whilst on international duty, he played professionally in the Netherlands, Belgium and Germany, making nearly 400 official appearances.

== Club career ==
Born in Amsterdam, Peeper started in the youth program of local club AFC Ajax, and played for HFC Haarlem, FC Twente, Sparta Rotterdam and FC Groningen in his country. He also competed abroad, with K.S.C. Lokeren Oost-Vlaanderen (Belgium) and Wuppertaler SV (Germany).

Peeper made his debut in the Eredivisie in the 1985–86 season, appearing in 24 games for Haarlem and going scoreless in the process. With Lokeren, after three years in the Belgian Second Division with K.S.C. Lokeren Oost-Vlaanderen, he helped them to the 12th position in the 1996–97 edition of the Pro League.

The 1990 injury, suffered while on international duty, was a career breaker. Peeper worked hard to get back into shape but was forced to acknowledge, years later, that he was never the same again. He was never recalled by the Dutch team, and Twente tried to get him medically disqualified from playing again, losing money when he made the move to Lokeren.

== International career ==
Peeper won one cap for the Netherlands, playing in a 28 March 1990 friendly with the Soviet Union in Kiev. His match lasted 18 minutes, as he was stretchered off after being injured by Sergei Gorlukovich and breaking his leg.

== Personal life ==
Peeper is one quarter Jewish.
