= Vardan Khachatryan =

Armenian footballer

Personal information
- Full name: Vardan Baregamovich Khachatryan
- Date of birth: 29 October 1968 (age 57)
- Place of birth: Yerevan, Armenian SSR, Soviet Union
- Height: 1.83 m (6 ft 0 in)
- Position: Defender

Senior career*
Years	Team	Apps	(Gls)
1986–1992	Ararat Yerevan	127	(0)
1993	Torpedo Moscow	8	(0)
1993–1995	Metalurh Zaporizhzhia	18	(0)
1995–1997	Pyunik Yerevan	38	(9)
1997	Köpetdag Aşgabat	?	(?)
1998	FC Yerevan	?	(?)
1998–1999	Zvartnots Yerevan	?	(?)
1999	Rubin Kazan	13	(0)

International career^{‡}
1992–2000	Armenia	30	(1)
- * Club domestic league appearances and goals as of 19 April 2008 ‡ National team caps and goals as of 19 April 2008

Vardan Khachatryan (Armenian: Վարդան Խաչատրյան, born 29 October 1968) is an Armenian former footballer who played as a defender. He was a member of the Armenia national football team, and played 30 matches and scored 1 goal since his debut on 14 October 1992, in a friendly match against Moldova ().
