= Inal Dzhioyev =

Russian footballer (born 1969)

Personal information
- Full name: Inal Gavrilovich Dzhioyev
- Date of birth: 5 November 1969 (age 56)
- Place of birth: Tskhinvali, Georgian SSR
- Height: 1.82 m (5 ft 11 1/2 in)
- Positions: Defender; midfielder

Senior career*
Years	Team	Apps	(Gls)
1984–1989	FC Spartaki Tskhinvali		
1989–1997	FC Alania Vladikavkaz	214	(16)
- * Club domestic league appearances and goals

Inal Gavrilovich Dzhioyev (Russian: Инал Гаврилович Джиоев; born 5 November 1969) is a former Russian professional footballer.

== Club career ==
He made his debut in the Soviet Top League in 1991 for FC Spartak Vladikavkaz.

== Honours ==
- Russian Premier League champion: 1995.
- Russian Premier League runner-up: 1992, 1996.

== European club competitions ==
All with FC Alania Vladikavkaz.

- UEFA Cup 1993–94: 2 games.
- UEFA Cup 1995–96: 2 games.
- UEFA Champions League 1996–97 qualification: 2 games.
- UEFA Cup 1996–97: 1 game.
- UEFA Cup 1997–98: 4 games.
