= Dmitry Mikhaylov =

Russian footballer and coach

Personal information
- Full name: Dmitry Valeryevich Mikhaylov
- Date of birth: 28 March 1976 (age 50)
- Height: 1.89 m (6 ft 2 1/2 in)
- Position: Goalkeeper

Senior career*
Years	Team	Apps	(Gls)
1992	Zenit Saint Petersburg	0	(0)
1993	Zenit-2 Saint Petersburg	5	(0)
1994	Zenit-d Saint Petersburg	6	(0)
1995–1997	Torpedo Pavlovo	84	(0)
1997–1998	Lokomotiv Nizhny Novgorod	10	(0)
1998–1999	Lada-Simbirsk Dimitrovgrad	27	(0)
2000–2001	Neftekhimik Nizhnekamsk	22	(0)
2003–2007	Alnas Almetyevsk	136	(0)
2008–2009	Khimik Dzerzhinsk	64	(0)

Managerial career
- 2015–2016: Volga-Olimpiyets Nizhny Novgorod (assistant)
- * Club domestic league appearances and goals

Dmitry Valeryevich Mikhaylov (Russian: Дмитрий Валерьевич Михайлов; born 28 March 1976) is a Russian professional football coach and a former player.

== Club career ==
He made his debut in the Russian Premier League in 1997 for FC Lokomotiv Nizhny Novgorod. He played two games in the UEFA Intertoto Cup 1997 for FC Lokomotiv Nizhny Novgorod.
