= Aleksandr Guzhov =

Russian footballer

Personal information
- Full name: Aleksandr Valeryevich Guzhov
- Date of birth: 17 February 1978 (age 48)
- Height: 1.74 m (5 ft 9 in)
- Position: Midfielder

Senior career*
Years	Team	Apps	(Gls)
1995–1996	FC TRASKO Moscow	21	(1)
1996–1998	FC Torpedo-Luzhniki Moscow	2	(0)
1996–1998	→ FC Torpedo-d Moscow	68	(9)
2000	FC KAMAZ-Chally Naberezhnye Chelny	1	(0)
2002	FC Vidnoye (amateur)		
2003	FC Vidnoye	7	(0)
- * Club domestic league appearances and goals

Aleksandr Valeryevich Guzhov (Russian: Александр Валерьевич Гужов; born 17 February 1978) is a former Russian professional footballer.

== Club career ==
He made his professional debut in the Russian Third League in 1995 for FC TRASKO Moscow. He played 1 game in the UEFA Intertoto Cup 1997 for FC Torpedo-Luzhniki Moscow.
