= Andrei Satsunkevich =

Belarusian football player and coach

Andrey Satsunkevich
Personal information
- Full name: Andrey Anatolyevich Satsunkevich
- Date of birth: 18 March 1966 (age 60)
- Place of birth: Minsk, Belarusian SSR, Soviet Union
- Height: 1.88 m (6 ft 2 in)
- Position: Goalkeeper

Team information
- Current team: Belarus (GK coach)

Youth career
- SDYuShOR-5 Minsk
- 1983–1986: Dinamo Minsk

Senior career*
| Years | Team | Apps | (Gls) |
| 1986–1993 | Dinamo Minsk | 130 | (0) |
| 1994 | Torpedo-d Moscow | 9 | (0) |
| 1995–1997 | Lokomotiv Nizhny Novgorod | 51 | (0) |
| 1998–2002 | Dinamo Minsk | 48 | (0) |

International career
| 1993–1999 | Belarus | 18 | (0) |

Managerial career
- 2003: Dinamo Minsk (goalkeeper coach)
- 2005–2006: Dinamo Brest (goalkeeper coach)
- 2007: Darida Minsk Raion (goalkeeper coach)
- 2008–: Belarus (goalkeeper coach)
- * Club domestic league appearances and goals

Andrey Anatolyevich Satsunkevich (Belarusian: Андрэй Анатольевiч Сацункевіч; Russian: Андрей Анатольевич Сацункевич; born 18 March 1966) is a Belarusian professional football coach and a former player. Since 2008 he works as a goalkeeper coach in Belarus national football team.

== Club career ==
He made his professional debut in the Soviet Top League in 1987 for FC Dinamo Minsk.

== Honours ==
Dinamo Minsk

- Belarusian Premier League champion: 1992, 1992–93, 1993–94
- Belarusian Cup winner: 1992, 1993–94
