= Igor Mordvinov =

Russian footballer

Personal information
- Full name: Igor Vladimirovich Mordvinov
- Date of birth: 21 June 1972 (age 54)
- Place of birth: Pavlovo, Russian SFSR
- Height: 1.71 m (5 ft 7 1/2 in)
- Positions: Midfielder; forward

Senior career*
Years	Team	Apps	(Gls)
1994–1997	FC Torpedo Pavlovo	105	(29)
1997	FC Lokomotiv Nizhny Novgorod	9	(0)
1998–1999	FC Torpedo Pavlovo	66	(37)
2000	FC Kristall Smolensk	27	(2)
2001	FC Sibur-Khimik Dzerzhinsk	16	(2)
2001	FC Kristall Smolensk	10	(0)
2002	FC Terek Grozny	36	(5)
2003	FC Lokomotiv Chita	34	(1)
2004	FC Sodovik Sterlitamak	15	(0)
2005–2006	FC Spartak Kostroma	62	(2)
2008–2009	FC Dynamo Kostroma		
- * Club domestic league appearances and goals

Igor Vladimirovich Mordvinov (Russian: Игорь Владимирович Мордвинов; born 21 June 1972) is a former Russian professional footballer.

== Club career ==
He made his professional debut in the Russian Third Division in 1994 for FC Torpedo Pavlovo. He played 2 games and scored 1 goal in the UEFA Intertoto Cup 1997 for FC Lokomotiv Nizhny Novgorod.
