= Yevgeni Kharlachyov =

Russian footballer and coach

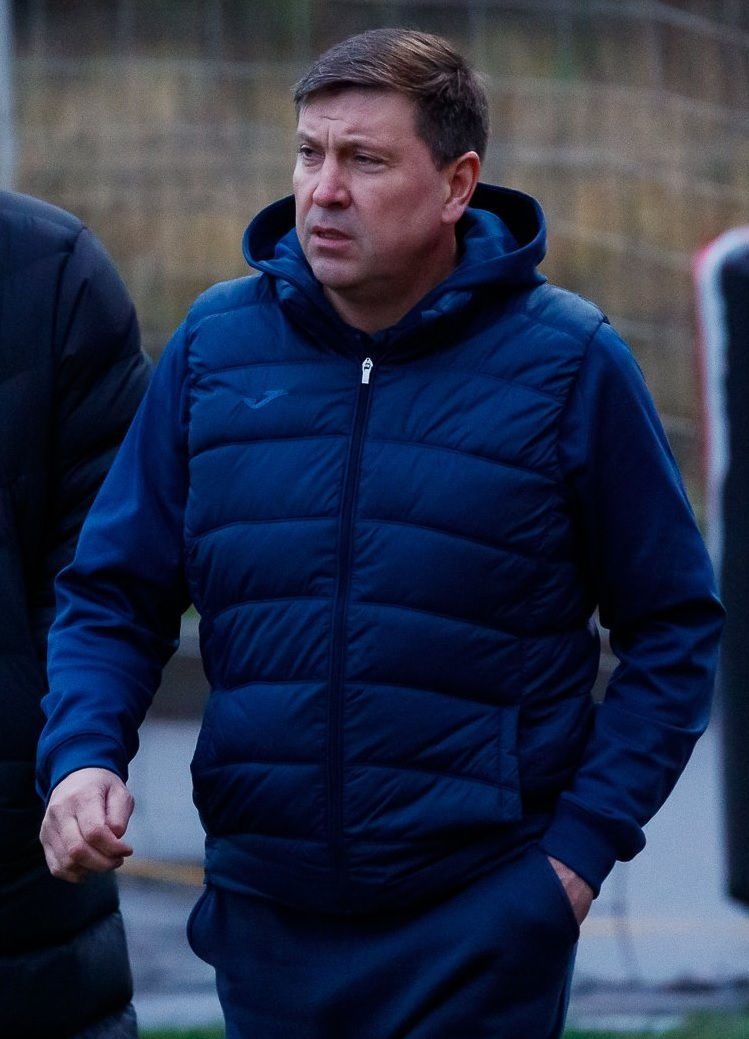
- Kharlachyov coaching Irtysh Omsk in 2020

Personal information
- Full name: Yevgeni Valeryevich Kharlachyov
- Date of birth: 20 January 1974 (age 52)
- Place of birth: Tolyatti, Russian SFSR
- Height: 1.78 m (5 ft 10 in)
- Position: Midfielder

Youth career
- Torpedo Tolyatti

Senior career*
Years	Team	Apps	(Gls)
1992–1993	Krylia Sovetov Samara	53	(6)
1994–2001	Lokomotiv Moscow	183	(33)
2001–2003	Dynamo Moscow	42	(7)
2004	Saturn Ramenskoye	2	(0)
2004	Baltika Kaliningrad	14	(5)
2005	Lada Tolyatti	13	(3)

International career
1993	Russia U-20	2	(0)
1994–1995	Russia U-21	13	(3)
1996–1998	Russia	6	(0)

Managerial career
- 2009–2011: Lokomotiv-2 Moscow
- 2014: Khimik Dzerzhinsk
- 2016: Solyaris Moscow
- 2016–2020: Lokomotiv Moscow (scout)
- 2020: Rotor Volgograd (assistant)
- 2020–2021: Irtysh Omsk
- 2022–2023: Sokol Saratov
- 2023: Ufa (assistant)
- 2023: Ufa (caretaker)
- 2023–2025: Ufa
- 2025: Ufa (youth)
- 2026: Sokol Saratov
- * Club domestic league appearances and goals

Yevgeni Valeryevich Kharlachyov (Russian: Евгений Валерьевич Харлачёв; born 20 January 1974) is a Russian football coach and a former player.

== International career ==
Kharlachyov made his debut for Russia on 28 August 1996 in a friendly against Brazil. He played in the qualifiers for 1998 FIFA World Cup.

== Coaching career ==
Kharlarchyov joined Ufa from the 2023–24 season initially as the assistant coach to head coach Sergey Gurenko. On 28 August 2023, after Gurenko was dismissed by the board, Kharlachyov was announced as the head coach of the club. By the end of the season, Kharlachyov led the club to promotion to the second-tier Russian First League. On 10 June 2024, the board of FC Ufa extended their contract with Kharlachyov towards the 2024–25 season.

== Honours ==
=== Senior career ===
- Russian Premier League runner-up: 1995, 1999, 2000.
- Russian Premier League bronze: 1994, 1998.
- Russian Cup winner: 1996, 1997, 2000, 2001.
- Russian Cup runner-up: 1998.
- Top 33 players year-end list: 1994, 1995, 1996, 1999.

=== Manager career ===
- Russian Second League winner: 2024
