= Aleksandr Smirnov (footballer, born 1968) =

Russian footballer and coach

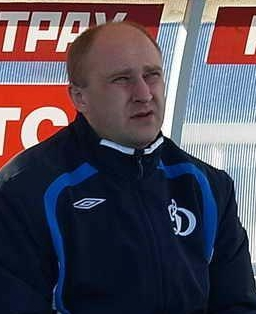

Personal information
- Full name: Aleksandr Vladimirovich Smirnov
- Date of birth: 19 May 1968 (age 58)
- Place of birth: Moscow, Russia
- Height: 1.83 m (6 ft 0 in)
- Positions: Midfielder; forward

Youth career
- –1985: EShVSM Moscow

Senior career*
Years	Team	Apps	(Gls)
1985	SC FShM Moscow	5	(2)
1985–1990	FC Dynamo Moscow	14	(1)
1986	→ FC Dynamo-2 Moscow	9	(2)
1990	FC Dinamo Sukhumi	32	(6)
1991–1993	FC Lokomotiv Moscow	79	(16)
1994	FC Dynamo Moscow	22	(8)
1995–1998	FC Lokomotiv Moscow	62	(8)
1996–1998	→ FC Lokomotiv-2 Moscow	13	(5)
1999–2000	FC Torpedo-ZIL Moscow	68	(20)
2001	FC Metallurg Krasnoyarsk	15	(3)

Managerial career
- 2003: FC Torpedo-ZIL Moscow (assistant)
- 2004: FC Titan Moscow (general director)
- 2004: FC Titan Moscow (team supervisor)
- 2005: FC Lokomotiv Kaluga (team supervisor)
- 2006–2010: FC Dynamo Moscow (assistant)
- 2010–2011: FC Dynamo Bryansk
- 2011–2012: FC Krylia Sovetov Samara (senior coach)
- 2015–2016: FC Dynamo Moscow (assistant)
- 2020–2022: Academy FC Torpedo Moscow
- 2022–2023: FC Torpedo Moscow (U-21)
- 2023: Academy FC Torpedo Moscow
- 2024: FC Spartak Tambov
- * Club domestic league appearances and goals

Aleksandr Vladimirovich Smirnov (Russian: Александр Владимирович Смирнов; born 19 May 1968) is a Russian professional football coach and a former player.

== Club career ==
As a player, he made his debut in the Soviet Top League in 1988 for FC Dynamo Moscow.

== Honours ==
- Soviet Top League bronze: 1990.
- Russian Premier League runner-up: 1994, 1995.
- Russian Premier League bronze: 1998.
- Russian Cup winner: 1996, 1997.
- Russian Cup finalist: 1998.

== European club competitions ==
- 1993–94 UEFA Cup with FC Lokomotiv Moscow: 2 games.
- 1994–95 UEFA Cup with FC Dynamo Moscow: 2 games, 1 goal.
- 1996–97 UEFA Cup Winners' Cup with FC Lokomotiv Moscow: 1 game.
- 1997–98 UEFA Cup Winners' Cup with FC Lokomotiv Moscow: 7 games (reached semifinal).
