= Andrei Rapeika =

Belarusian footballer

Personal information
- Full name: Andrei Albinovich Rapeika
- Date of birth: 21 September 1971 (age 55)
- Height: 1.91 m (6 ft 3 in)
- Position: Midfielder

Youth career
- 1988–1989: Dinamo Minsk

Senior career*
Years	Team	Apps	(Gls)
1990–1995	Shakhtyor Soligorsk	110	(15)
1996–1998	Lokomotiv Nizhny Novgorod	58	(6)
1999	Dynamo Stavropol	3	(0)
2001	Shakhtyor Soligorsk	16	(1)
2002–2003	Granit Mikashevichi	39	(10)
2004	Don Novomoskovsk	0	(0)
2008–2009	Slutsksakhar Slutsk	42	(23)
- * Club domestic league appearances and goals

Andrei Albinovich Rapeika (Belarusian: Андрэй Альбинович Рапейка; Russian: Андрей Альбинович Рапейко; born 21 September 1971) is a former Belarusian professional footballer.

== Club career ==
He made his professional debut in the Belarusian Premier League in 1992 for Shakhtyor Soligorsk . He played 6 games in the 1997 UEFA Intertoto Cup for FC Lokomotiv Nizhny Novgorod.
