= Vyacheslav Kamoltsev =

Russian footballer

Personal information
- Full name: Vyacheslav Anatolyevich Kamoltsev
- Date of birth: 14 December 1971 (age 54)
- Place of birth: Kurgan, Russian SFSR, USSR
- Height: 1.76 m (5 ft 9 1/2 in)
- Position: Striker

Youth career
- DYuSSh-3 Kurgan

Senior career*
Years	Team	Apps	(Gls)
1988–1991	FC Torpedo Kurgan	102	(25)
1992–1995	FC Dynamo-Gazovik Tyumen	102	(36)
1996–1999	FC Torpedo Moscow	114	(26)
2000	Kocaelispor	12	(3)
2000–2001	FC Torpedo Moscow	30	(3)
2002–2004	FC Chernomorets Novorossiysk	71	(29)
2005	FC Oryol	10	(2)
2005–2006	FC Spartak Shchyolkovo	29	(18)
2006	FC Chernomorets Novorossiysk	16	(6)
Total		486	(148)

Managerial career
- 2008–2017: FShM Moscow
- 2019–2020: Yunost Moskvy-Burevestnik Moscow
- 2020: FC Yessentuki
- 2022: FC Zorkiy Krasnogorsk (assistant)
- 2022: FC Zorkiy Krasnogorsk
- * Club domestic league appearances and goals

Vyacheslav Anatolyevich Kamoltsev (Russian: Вячеслав Анатольевич Камольцев; born 14 December 1971) is a Russian professional football coach and a former player.

== Club career ==
He made his professional debut in the Soviet Second League in 1988 for FC Torpedo Kurgan.

== Honours ==
- Russian Premier League bronze: 2000.
- Russian First Division top scorer: 1993 (Zone East, 22 goals), 2002 (20 goals).
- Russian Premier League Cup finalist: 2003.

== European club competitions ==
With FC Torpedo Moscow.

- UEFA Cup 1996–97: 3 games, 1 goal.
- UEFA Intertoto Cup 1997: 6 games, 1 goal.
- UEFA Cup 2000–01: 1 game.
- UEFA Cup 2001–02: 1 game.
