= Vladimir Dzhubanov =

Russian footballer

Personal information
- Full name: Vladimir Vyacheslavovich Dzhubanov
- Date of birth: December 3, 1975 (age 50)
- Place of birth: Domodedovo, Russian SFSR
- Height: 1.71 m (5 ft 7 1/2 in)
- Position: Forward

Senior career*
Years	Team	Apps	(Gls)
1996	FC Spartak Moscow	25	(3)
1997	FC Lokomotiv Nizhny Novgorod	4	(0)
1998	FC Spartak-2 Moscow	22	(10)
1998	FC Anzhi Makhachkala	17	(1)
1999	Dinaburg FC	9	(4)
2000–2001	FC KAMAZ Naberezhnye Chelny	58	(41)
2003–2007	FC Reutov	136	(66)
2008	FC Olimp-SKOPA Zheleznodorozhny		

Managerial career
- 2008: FC Reutov (administrator)
- 2009: FC Olimp-SKOPA Zheleznodorozhny (assistant)
- 2010: FC Olimp-SKOPA Zheleznodorozhny (administrator)
- 2011: FC Prialit Reutov (administrator)
- 2013–2016: FC Spartak Moscow (academy coach)
- 2016–2017: FC Spartak Moscow (U-21 assistant)
- 2017–2018: FC Spartak-2 Moscow (assistant)
- * Club domestic league appearances and goals

Vladimir Vyacheslavovich Dzhubanov (Russian: Владимир Вячеславович Джубанов; born 3 December 1975) is a Russian professional football coach and a former player.

== Club career ==
He made his debut in the Russian Premier League in 1996 for FC Spartak Moscow.

== Honours ==
- Russian Premier League champion: 1996.
- Russian Cup finalist: 1996.
- Russian Second Division Zone West top scorer: 2003 (25 goals).

== European club competitions ==
- UEFA Cup 1996–97 with FC Spartak Moscow: 4 games.
- UEFA Intertoto Cup 1997 with FC Lokomotiv Nizhny Novgorod: 5 games.
