= Eduard Kosolapov =

Russian footballer

Personal information
- Full name: Eduard Viktorovich Kosolapov
- Date of birth: 27 March 1976
- Place of birth: Ruzayevka, Russian SFSR
- Date of death: 18 April 2014 (aged 38)
- Place of death: Ruzayevka, Russia
- Height: 1.75 m (5 ft 9 in)
- Positions: Forward; midfielder

Senior career*
Years	Team	Apps	(Gls)
1994–1996	FC Svetotekhnika Saransk	69	(11)
1997–1998	FC Dynamo Moscow	10	(1)
1999	FC Zhemchuzhina-2 Sochi	5	(3)
2001	FC Tom Tomsk	4	(1)
2001	FC Kuzbass-Dynamo Kemerovo	14	(0)
2003–2005	FC Dynamo Bryansk	87	(19)
2006–2008	FC Mordovia Saransk	85	(20)
2009	FC Khimmash Ruzayevka		
- * Club domestic league appearances and goals

Eduard Viktorovich Kosolapov (Russian: Эдуард Викторович Косолапов; 27 March 1976 – 18 April 2014) was a Russian professional footballer.

== Club career ==
He made his professional debut in the Russian Second Division in 1994 for FC Svetotekhnika Saransk. He played 3 games and scored 1 goal in the UEFA Intertoto Cup 1997 for FC Dynamo Moscow.

== Death ==
He committed suicide by gunshot in April 2014.

== Honours ==
- Russian Premier League bronze: 1997.
