= Yevgeni Durnev =

Russian footballer and coach

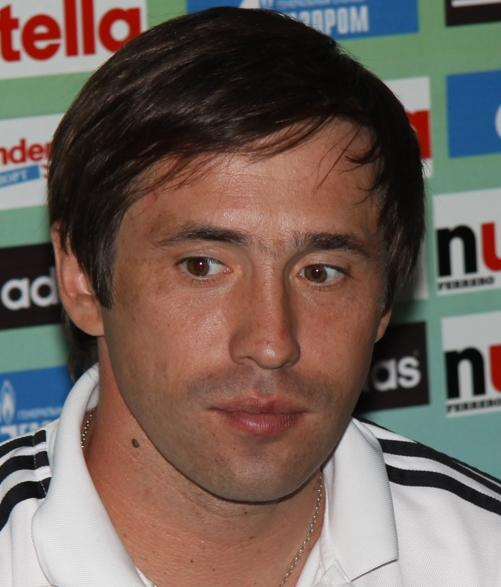

Personal information
- Full name: Yevgeni Yevgenyevich Durnev
- Date of birth: 4 August 1972 (age 54)
- Place of birth: Vladimir, Russian SFSR
- Height: 1.76 m (5 ft 9 1/2 in)
- Positions: Midfielder; striker

Team information
- Current team: FC Torpedo Vladimir (VP of sports)

Senior career*
Years	Team	Apps	(Gls)
1990–1992	FC Torpedo Vladimir	98	(20)
1993–1995	FC KAMAZ Naberezhnye Chelny	85	(15)
1996–1997	FC Lokomotiv Nizhny Novgorod	18	(2)
1998	FC Uralan Elista	28	(9)
1999–2000	FC Torpedo Moscow	19	(5)
2001–2002	FC Uralan Plus Moscow	37	(13)
2003	FC Kosmos Yegoryevsk	3	(0)
2004–2005	FC Torpedo Vladimir	43	(12)

International career
1994	Russia U-21	2	(0)

Managerial career
- 2006: FC Torpedo Vladimir (assistant)
- 2007–2011: FC Torpedo Vladimir
- 2012–2013: FC Tyumen
- 2015–2016: FC Torpedo Vladimir
- 2017–: FC Torpedo Vladimir (VP of sports)
- * Club domestic league appearances and goals

Yevgeni Yevgenyevich Durnev (Russian: Евгений Евгеньевич Дурнев; born 4 August 1972 in Vladimir) is a Russian professional football coach and a former player. He works as a deputy director of sports with FC Torpedo Vladimir.

As a player, he made his debut in the Soviet Second League in 1990 for FC Torpedo Vladimir.

== Honours ==
- Russian Second Division, Zone West best manager: 2010.
