= Sergei Ovchinnikov (footballer, born 1970) =

Russian footballer

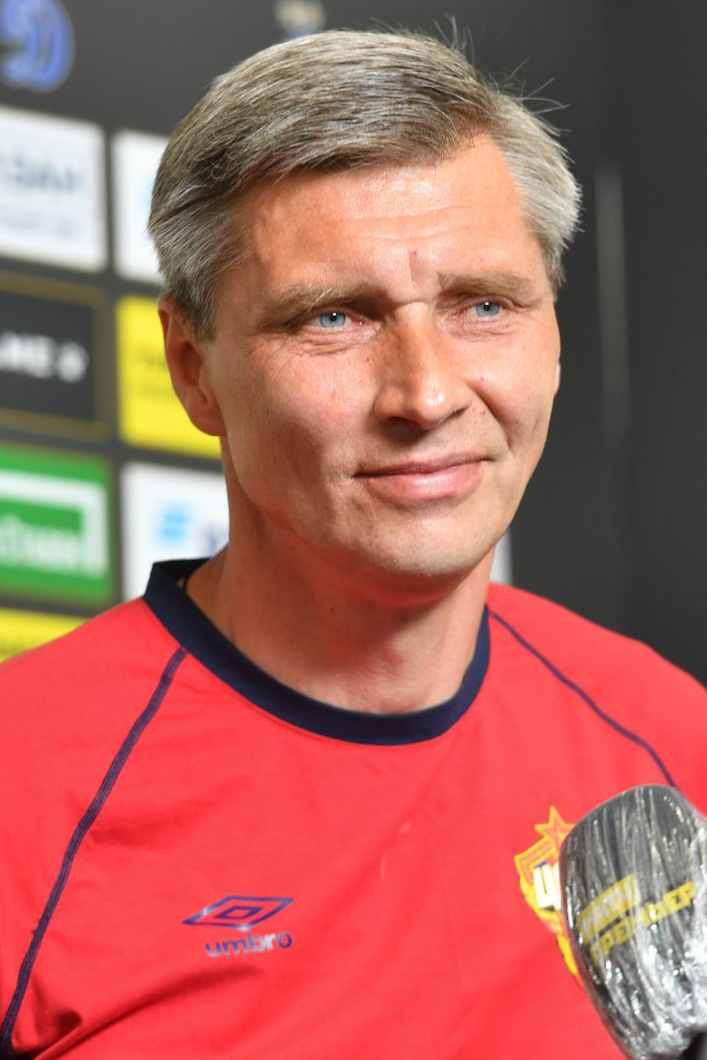

Personal information
- Full name: Sergei Ivanovich Ovchinnikov
- Date of birth: 10 November 1970 (age 56)
- Place of birth: Moscow, Russian SFSR, Soviet Union
- Height: 1.88 m (6 ft 2 in)
- Position: Goalkeeper

Team information
- Current team: Lokomotiv Moscow (caretaker manager)

Youth career
- 1982–1990: Dynamo Moscow

Senior career*
Years	Team	Apps	(Gls)
1988–1989	Dynamo-2 Moscow	71	(0)
1990	Dynamo Sukhumi	33	(0)
1991–1997	Lokomotiv Moscow	180	(0)
1994	Lokomotiv-d Moscow	1	(0)
1997–1999	Benfica	20	(0)
1999–2000	Alverca	27	(0)
2000–2002	Porto	42	(0)
2002	→ Lokomotiv Moscow (loan)	12	(0)
2002–2005	Lokomotiv Moscow	103	(0)
2006	Dynamo Moscow	18	(0)
Total		502	(0)

International career
1993–2005	Russia	35	(0)

Managerial career
- 2007–2008: Lokomotiv Moscow (goalkeeping coach)
- 2008–2009: Dynamo Kyiv (assistant)
- 2009–2010: Kuban Krasnodar
- 2010–2011: Dynamo Bryansk
- 2011: Dinamo Minsk
- 2011–2012: Konoplyov football academy (goalkeeping coach)
- 2012–2016: Russia (goalkeeping coach)
- 2014–2020: CSKA Moscow (coach)
- 2025–2026: Lokomotiv Moscow (academy)
- 2026–: Lokomotiv Moscow (caretaker)
- * Club domestic league appearances and goals

Sergei Ivanovich Ovchinnikov (Russian: Серге́й Ива́нович Овчи́нников, IPA: [sʲɪrˈɡʲej ɪˈvanəvʲɪtɕ ɐfˈtɕinʲːɪkəf]; born 10 November 1970) is a Russian football coach and a former goalkeeper who is the caretaker manager of Russian Premier League club Lokomotiv Moscow. Nicknamed "The Boss" for his commanding presence inside the box, he most notably played for Lokomotiv Moscow, Benfica, Porto and the Russian national team.

== Playing career ==
A Dynamo Moscow academy graduate, Ovchinnikov started his senior career at Dynamo Sukhumi but left for joined Lokomotiv Moscow after a year. In 1992, he asserted himself in Yuri Syomin's first choice squad and remained the main goalkeeper until his move to Benfica in 1997.

In 2002, having played for Benfica, Alverca and Porto, Ovchinnikov came back to Lokomotiv.

The goalkeeper played two matches for Russia in Euro 2004 but was sent off in the match against Portugal for handling outside the area.

In 2005 Ovchinnikov joined Dynamo Moscow, following former Loko coach Yuri Syomin. In 2006 Dynamo released Ovchinnikov, after the goalkeeper got involved in a clash with a referee Igor Zakharov.

== Coaching career ==
In April 2007 Sergei Ovchinnikov became Lokomotiv Moscow club goalkeeping coach and started to work with children and the reserves. In December 2007, he became Yuri Syomin's assistant at Dynamo Kyiv.

Next, he became the new manager of Kuban Krasnodar in the 2009 Russian Premier League season but was sacked on 9 August, after a 0–2 defeat at home, against Saturn.

On 7 May 2010, Ovchinnikov was named the new coach of Dynamo Bryansk.

On 17 November 2026, Ovchinnikov was appointed caretaker manager by Lokomotiv Moscow.

== Achievements ==
- Russian Premier League champion (2002, 2004) with Lokomotiv Moscow
- Russian Cup winner (1996, 1997) with Lokomotiv Moscow
- Russian Super Cup winner (2003, 2005) with Lokomotiv Moscow
- Commonwealth of Independent States Cup winner (2005) with Lokomotiv Moscow
- Taça de Portugal winner (1999/2000, 2000/01) with Porto
- Supertaça Cândido de Oliveira winner (2001) with Porto
- Russian Goalkeeper of the Year (1994, 1995, 2002, 2003)

== Career statistics ==
Club	Season	League			Cup		Continental		Other		Total	
Club	Season	Division	Apps	Goals	Apps	Goals	Apps	Goals	Apps	Goals	Apps	Goals
Dynamo-2 Moscow	1988	Soviet Second League	34	0	–		–		–		34	0
Dynamo-2 Moscow	1989	Soviet Second League	37	0	–		–		–		37	0
Dynamo-2 Moscow	Total		71	0	0	0	0	0	0	0	71	0
Dynamo Sukhumi	1990	Soviet First League	33	0	0	0	–		–		33	0
Lokomotiv Moscow	1991	Soviet Top League	18	0	2	0	–		–		20	0
Lokomotiv Moscow	1992	Russian Premier League	24	0	5	0	–		–		29	0
Lokomotiv Moscow	1993	Russian Premier League	33	0	2	0	2 (Note: Appearances in the UEFA Cup)	0	–		37	0
Lokomotiv Moscow	1994	Russian Premier League	28	0	2	0	–		–		30	0
Lokomotiv Moscow	1995	Russian Premier League	27	0	3	0	2	0	–		32	0
Lokomotiv Moscow	1996	Russian Premier League	33	0	3	0	4 (Note: Appearances in the UEFA Cup Winners' Cup)	0	–		40	0
Lokomotiv Moscow	1997	Russian Premier League	17	0	4	0	–		–		21	0
Lokomotiv Moscow	Total		180	0	21	0	8	0	0	0	209	0
Lokomotiv-d Moscow	1997	Russian Third League	1	0	–		–		–		1	0
Benfica	1997–98	Primeira Liga	6	0	0	0	1	0	–		7	0
Benfica	1998–99	Primeira Liga	14	0	0	0	2 (Note: Appearances in the UEFA Champions League)	0	–		16	0
Benfica	Total		20	0	0	0	3	0	0	0	23	0
Alverca	1999–2000	Primeira Liga	27	0	0	0	–		–		27	0
Porto	2000–01	Primeira Liga	33	0	0	0	11 (Note: Two appearances in the UEFA Champions League, nine appearances in the UEFA Cup)	0	2 (Note: Appearances in the Supertaça Cândido de Oliveira)	0	46	0
Porto	2001–02	Primeira Liga	9	0	0	0	8	0	1	0	18	0
Porto	Total		42	0	0	0	19	0	3	0	64	0
Lokomotiv Moscow (loan)	2002	Russian Premier League	12	0	–		–		–		12	0
Lokomotiv Moscow	2002	Russian Premier League	19	0	0	0	10	0	–		29	0
Lokomotiv Moscow	2003	Russian Premier League	25	0	0	0	12	0	1 (Note: Appearances in the Russian Super Cup)	0	38	0
Lokomotiv Moscow	2004	Russian Premier League	30	0	5	0	2	0	–		37	0
Lokomotiv Moscow	2005	Russian Premier League	29	0	1	0	9 (Note: Four appearances in the UEFA Champions League, five appearances in the UEFA Cup)	0	1	0	40	0
Lokomotiv Moscow	Total		103	0	6	0	33	0	2	0	144	0
Dynamo Moscow	2006	Russian Premier League	13	0	5	0	–		–		18	0
Career total			502	0	32	0	63	0	5	0	602	0
