= Yevgeni Kashentsev =

Belarusian footballer

Yevgeni Kashentsev Евгений Кашенцев
Personal information
- Full name: Yevgeni Nikolayevich Kashentsev
- Date of birth: 12 March 1971 (age 55)
- Place of birth: Barnaul, Soviet Union
- Height: 1.74 m (5 ft 8 1/2 in)
- Positions: Midfielder; striker

Senior career*
Years	Team	Apps	(Gls)
1988	Dynamo Barnaul	12	(5)
1989–1995	Dinamo Minsk	117	(22)
1995–1996	Maccabi Tel Aviv	42	(9)
1997	Hapoel Tayibe	15	(4)
1997–1998	Ironi Rishon LeZion	26	(6)
2000	Dynamo Barnaul	11	(1)

International career
1992	Russia U21	1	(0)
1993–1996	Belarus	10	(0)
- * Club domestic league appearances and goals

Yevgeni Nikolayevich Kashentsev (Russian: Евгений Николаевич Кашенцев; born 12 March 1971) is a retired Belarusian professional footballer. He also holds Russian citizenship.

He is the older brother of Nikolai Kashentsev.

== Honours ==
Dinamo Minsk

- Belarusian Premier League champion: 1992, 1992–93, 1993–94, 1994–95, 1995
- Belarusian Cup winner: 1992, 1993–94

Maccabi Tel Aviv

- Israeli Premier League champion: 1995–96
- Israel State Cup winner: 1995–96
