= Sergei Lutovinov =

Russian footballer

Sergei Lutovinov Серге́й Лутовинов
Personal information
- Full name: Sergei Aleksandrovich Lutovinov
- Date of birth: 25 March 1975 (age 51)
- Place of birth: Kolomna, Russian SFSR
- Height: 1.78 m (5 ft 10 in)
- Position: Forward

Senior career*
Years	Team	Apps	(Gls)
1992	FC Oka Kolomna	1	(0)
1993	FC Viktor-Gigant Voskresensk	9	(1)
1994–1996	FC Oka Kolomna	117	(29)
1997–1998	FC Spartak Moscow	6	(0)
1998–1999	Maccabi Tel Aviv		
1999–2000	FC Spartak-Chukotka Moscow	54	(29)
2000–2001	FC Amkar Perm	14	(1)
2002–2003	FC Kolomna	30	(11)
2003	FC Oryol	6	(0)
2004	FC Ryazanskaya GRES Novomichurinsk		
2004–2005	FC Kolomna		
2006–2010	FC Oka Stupino		

International career
1997	Russia U-21	3	(1)
- * Club domestic league appearances and goals

Sergei Aleksandrovich Lutovinov (Russian: Серге́й Александрович Лутовинов; born 25 March 1975) is a Russian former professional footballer.

He made his professional debut in the Russian Second Division in 1992 for FC Oka Kolomna.

== Honours ==
- Russian Premier League champion: 1997.
- Russian Cup winner: 1998.

== European club competitions ==
With FC Spartak Moscow.

- UEFA Champions League 1997–98 qualification: 1 game.
- UEFA Cup 1997–98: 3 games.
