= Aleksandr Lipko =

Russian footballer and official

Personal information
- Full name: Aleksandr Valeryevich Lipko
- Date of birth: 18 August 1975 (age 51)
- Place of birth: Krasnodar, Russian SFSR
- Height: 1.86 m (6 ft 1 in)
- Position: Defender

Team information
- Current team: FC Nizhny Novgorod (director of sports)

Youth career
- SDYuSShOR-5 Krasnodar
- Urozhay Krasnodar

Senior career*
Years	Team	Apps	(Gls)
1992–1995	FC Spartak-d Moscow	88	(5)
1994–1996	FC Spartak Moscow	25	(0)
1997–1999	FC Lokomotiv Nizhny Novgorod	62	(3)
2000–2001	FC Shinnik Yaroslavl	60	(2)
2002	FC Rubin Kazan	28	(0)
2003–2005	FC Terek Grozny	99	(3)
2006	FC Salyut-Energia Belgorod	33	(0)
2007–2009	FC Nizhny Novgorod	49	(1)

International career
1994–1995	Russia U-21	8	(0)
1995	Russia U-20	4	(1)

Managerial career
- 2010: FC Volga Nizhny Novgorod (head scout)
- 2010–2012: FC Volga Nizhny Novgorod (director of sports)
- 2013–2014: FC Zenit St. Petersburg (assistant)
- 2014–2016: FC Volga Nizhny Novgorod (director of sports)
- 2016–: FC Nizhny Novgorod (director of sports)
- * Club domestic league appearances and goals

Aleksandr Valeryevich Lipko (Russian: Александр Валерьевич Липко; born 18 August 1975) is a Russian football official and a former player.

He is the director of sports for FC Nizhny Novgorod.

== Honours ==
- Russian Premier League champion: 1994, 1996.
- Russian Cup winner: 2004.
- Russian Cup finalist: 1996.

== European competition history ==
- UEFA Champions League 1994–95 with FC Spartak Moscow: 2 games.
- UEFA Champions League 1995–96 with FC Spartak Moscow: 2 games.
- UEFA Cup 1996–97 with FC Spartak Moscow: 1 game.
- UEFA Intertoto Cup 1997 with FC Lokomotiv Nizhny Novgorod: 4 games.
- UEFA Cup 2004–05 with FC Terek Grozny: 4 games.
