= Georgi Botsiyev =

Russian footballer and coach

Personal information
- Full name: Georgi Beslanovich Botsiyev
- Date of birth: 2 September 1976 (age 50)
- Place of birth: Ordzhonikidze, Russian SFSR
- Height: 1.76 m (5 ft 9 1/2 in)
- Position: Midfielder

Senior career*
Years	Team	Apps	(Gls)
1992–1993	FC Spartak-2 Vladikavkaz		
1994–2003	FC Spartak Vladikavkaz	91	(5)
1994	→ FC Avtodor Vladikavkaz (loan)	14	(1)
1997	→ FC Torpedo-Luzhniki Moscow (loan)	12	(0)
1998–1999	→ PFC Spartak Nalchik (loan)	36	(4)
1999	→ FC Dynamo Stavropol (loan)	14	(1)
2004	FC Nika Moscow (amateur)		
2005	FC Volgar-Gazprom Astrakhan	13	(1)

International career
1995–1997	Russia U-21	12	(2)

Managerial career
- 2009: FC Avtodor Vladikavkaz
- * Club domestic league appearances and goals

Georgi Beslanovich Botsiyev (Russian: Георгий Бесланович Боциев; born 2 September 1976) is a Russian professional football coach and a former player.

== Club career ==
He made his debut in the Russian Premier League in 1994 for FC Spartak Vladikavkaz.

== Honours ==
- Russian Premier League champion: 1995.
- Russian Premier League runner-up: 1996.
