= Aslan Datdeyev =

Russian footballer (born 1973)

Personal information
- Full name: Aslan Tambiyevich Datdeyev
- Date of birth: 17 October 1973 (age 53)
- Place of birth: Ordzhonikidze, Russian SFSR
- Height: 1.75 m (5 ft 9 in)
- Positions: Defender; midfielder

Senior career*
Years	Team	Apps	(Gls)
1989	Spartak Ordzhonikidze	0	(0)
1990–1994	FC Avtodor Vladikavkaz	109	(7)
1994–1998	FC Alania Vladikavkaz	57	(3)
1999	FC Rostselmash Rostov-on-Don	6	(0)
2000	FC Alania Vladikavkaz	0	(0)
2001	FC Esil Bogatyr	4	(0)
2002	FC Shakhter Karagandy	1	(0)
2002	FC Titan Reutov	5	(0)
- * Club domestic league appearances and goals

Aslan Tambiyevich Datdeyev (Russian: Аслан Тамбиевич Датдеев; born 17 October 1973) is a Russian retired professional footballer.

== Playing career ==
He made his debut in the Russian Premier League in 1994 for FC Spartak Vladikavkaz.

== Honours ==
- Russian Premier League champion: 1995.
- Russian Premier League runner-up: 1996.

== European club competitions ==
- UEFA Cup 1996–97 with FC Alania Vladikavkaz: 1 game.
- UEFA Cup 1997–98 with FC Alania Vladikavkaz: 3 game.
- UEFA Intertoto Cup 1999 with FC Rostselmash Rostov-on-Don: 4 games.
