= Aleksey Arifullin =

Russian footballer

Personal information
- Full name: Aleksey Sayarovich Arifullin
- Date of birth: 13 October 1970
- Place of birth: Moscow, Russian SFSR
- Date of death: 28 September 2017 (aged 46)
- Place of death: Moscow, Russia
- Height: 1.83 m (6 ft 0 in)
- Position: Defender

Youth career
- 1980–1988: FC Lokomotiv Moscow

Senior career*
Years	Team	Apps	(Gls)
1988–2000	FC Lokomotiv Moscow	224	(0)
2000	FC Torpedo-ZIL Moscow	11	(1)
2001	FC Krylia Sovetov Samara	3	(0)
2001	FC Dynamo Moscow	3	(0)

International career
1998	Russia	1	(0)
- * Club domestic league appearances and goals

Aleksey Sayarovich Arifullin (Russian: Алексей Саярович Арифуллин) (13 October 1970 − 28 September 2017) was a Russian association footballer.

== Club career ==
Arifullin played in the Russian Top League with FC Lokomotiv Moscow, FC Krylia Sovetov Samara and FC Dynamo Moscow. He never scored in a league match, and is one of a few players to make more than 100 appearances in the league without scoring a goal.

== Honours ==
- Russian Premier League runner-up: 1995, 1999.
- Russian Premier League bronze: 1994, 1998.
- Russian Cup winner: 1996, 1997, 2000.
- Russian Cup finalist: 1990, 1998.

== International career ==
Born in Moscow, Arifullin played his only international game for Russia on 22 April 1998 in a friendly against Turkey.

== European club competitions ==
All with FC Lokomotiv Moscow.

- UEFA Cup 1993–94: 2 games.
- UEFA Cup 1995–96: 2 games.
- UEFA Cup Winners' Cup 1996–97 : 1 game.
- UEFA Cup Winners' Cup 1997–98: 7 games (reached semifinal).
- UEFA Cup Winners' Cup 1998–99: 7 games (reached semifinal).
- UEFA Cup 1999–2000: 5 games.
