= Oleh Koshelyuk =

Ukrainian footballer (born 1969)

Oleh Koshelyuk Олег Кошелюк
Personal information
- Full name: Oleh Borysovych Koshelyuk
- Date of birth: 7 September 1969 (age 57)
- Place of birth: Lviv, Ukrainian SSR
- Height: 1.74 m (5 ft 9 in)
- Positions: Midfielder; forward

Team information
- Current team: DYuFK Odesa (coach)

Senior career*
Years	Team	Apps	(Gls)
1985–1988	Shakhtar Pavlohrad	89	(4)
1988	Dnipro Dnipropetrovsk	1	(1)
1989–1990	SKA Odessa	85	(15)
1991–1993	Chornomorets Odesa	87	(12)
1993	Beitar Jerusalem	31	(9)
1994	Hapoel Haifa	30	(3)
1995–1996	Hapoel Ironi Rishon LeZion	29	(3)
1996–1997	Hapoel Beit She'an	26	(0)
1997	Torpedo-Luzhniki Moscow	16	(0)
1997–1999	Metalurh Mariupol	8	(0)
1999–2001	Metallurg Krasnoyarsk	93	(3)
2002	FC Tyras-2500 Bilhorod-Dnistrovskyi		
2003	FC Esil Bogatyr	11	(1)
2004–2006	Dnipro Cherkasy	50	(1)

International career
1991	USSR U21	1	(0)

Managerial career
- 2011: FC Real Pharma Odessa (administrator)
- 2012–2013: FC Tairove (assistant)
- 2014–: DYuFK Odesa
- * Club domestic league appearances and goals

Oleh Borysovych Koshelyuk (Ukrainian: Олег Борисович Кошелюк; born 7 September 1969) is a Ukrainian professional football coach and a former player. He works as children's coach with DYuFK Odesa.

He made his professional debut in the Soviet Second League in 1986 for FC Shakhtar Pavlohrad. He played 4 games in the UEFA Intertoto Cup 1997 for FC Torpedo-Luzhniki Moscow.

== Honours ==
- Soviet Top League: 1988
- Soviet Cup: 1989 (played in the early stages of the 1988–89 tournament for Dnipro Dnipropetrovsk)
- Ukrainian Premier League third place: 1992, 1993
- Ukrainian Cup: 1992
