= Radislav Orlovsky =

Belarusian footballer (born 1970)

Personal information
- Full name: Radislav Vladimirovich Orlovsky
- Date of birth: 9 March 1970 (age 56)
- Place of birth: Krasnodar, Soviet Union
- Height: 1.77 m (5 ft 9 1/2 in)
- Position: Midfielder

Senior career*
Years	Team	Apps	(Gls)
1987–1988	Nart Cherkessk	24	(0)
1989	Stroitel Starye Dorogi		
1991–1995	Dinamo Minsk	51	(8)
1995–1996	Dinamo-93 Minsk	40	(11)
1997–2000	Torpedo Moscow	109	(8)
2001	Fakel Voronezh	25	(2)
2002	Liepājas Metalurgs	5	(0)
2002–2003	Zvezda-VA-BGU Minsk	8	(3)
2004	Smena Minsk	15	(6)
Total		277	(38)

International career
1992–2000	Belarus	26	(2)

Managerial career
- 2010–2011: Dinamo Minsk (assistant)
- 2015–2018: Dinamo Minsk (youth)
- 2019–2021: Dinamo Minsk (reserves assistant)
- 2019: Dinamo Minsk (caretaker)
- 2022: Dinamo Minsk (assistant)
- * Club domestic league appearances and goals

Radislav Vladimirovich Orlovsky (Belarusian: Радзіслаў Уладзіміравіч Арлоўскі; Russian: Радислав Владимирович Орловский; born 9 March 1970) is a Belarusian professional football coach and a former player.

== Career ==
He made his professional debut in the Soviet Second League in 1987 for Nart Cherkessk.

In 2002, Orlovsky signed for Zvezda-VA-BGU Minsk.

== Honours ==
- Belarusian Premier League champion: 1992, 1992–93, 1993–94, 1994–95.
- Belarusian Cup winner: 1992, 1993–94.
