= Giorgi Gakhokidze =

Georgian footballer

Giorgi Gakhokidze გიორგი გახოკიძე
Personal information
- Date of birth: 5 November 1975 (age 50)
- Place of birth: Tbilisi, Soviet Union
- Height: 1.83 m (6 ft 0 in)
- Positions: Midfielder; forward

Senior career*
Years	Team	Apps	(Gls)
1993–1995	Metalurgi Rustavi	33	(0)
1995–1996	Dinamo Tbilisi	0	(0)
1996–1997	Kolkheti 1913 Poti	10	(2)
1997–1998	Alania Vladikavkaz	43	(8)
1998–2003	PSV	42	(4)
1999–2000	→ Maccabi Haifa (loan)	32	(1)
2003–2006	Twente	47	(3)
2004–2005	→ Metalurh Donetsk (loan)	2	(0)
Total		209	(18)

International career
1996–2006	Georgia	21	(3)
- * Club domestic league appearances and goals

Giorgi Gakhokidze (Georgian: გიორგი გახოკიძე; born 5 November 1975) is a Georgian former professional footballer who played as a midfielder or forward for PSV Eindhoven, Maccabi Haifa, FC Twente and Metalurh Donetsk among others. Between 1996 and 2006 he was also a member of the Georgia national team.

== Club career ==
=== Early career ===
Gakhokidze was born in Tbilisi, Georgian SSR. He started his career at Metalurgi Rustavi before moving to Georgian top club FC Dinamo Tbilisi, but did not play any matches and moved to FC Kolkheti-1913 Poti and later to Spartak-Alania Vladikavkaz, to play in the Russian league. Dutch giants PSV Eindhoven showed interest in the player and brought him into the Netherlands. In his first season, he was unable to gain himself a spot in the first team and was sent on a loan deal with Maccabi Haifa F.C. where he developed himself into a better player.

=== Breakthrough and downfall ===
Back at PSV Gakhokidze still struggled to play a decent number of matches, but in the 2001–02 season things changed. Gakhokidze played in 25 of PSV's 34 matches that season. However, mainly due to injuries he only got a total of eight matches in the following season. Recovered from the injuries he moved to FC Twente and had a good season with a lot of match rhythm and some goals as well.

Gakhokidze felt the need to return to the eastern part of Europe and switched to Ukraine based Metalurg Donetsk. At this team however he only came to a total of two matches, while at his following team FC Krylya Sovetov Samara he did not play at all. His former team FC Twente decided to contract him again, but injuries forced him to set back most of the time and he only came to 19 appearances from 2005 to the end of 2006. On 29 December 2006 Gakhokidze decided to terminate his contract and end his career at the age of 31.

== International career ==
Besides his club appearances Gakhokidze also played in 21 matches for the Georgian national team, and scored 3 goals.

== Career statistics ==
Appearances and goals by club, season and competition
Club	Season	League		
Club	Season	Division	Apps	Goals
Metalurgi Rustavi	1993–94	Umaglesi Liga	26	0
Metalurgi Rustavi	1994–95	Umaglesi Liga	7	0
Dinamo Tbilisi	1995–96	Umaglesi Liga	0	0
Kolkheti-1913 Poti	1996–97	Umaglesi Liga	10	2
Spartak-Alania Vladikavkaz	1997	Russian Premier League	29	7
Spartak-Alania Vladikavkaz	1998	Russian Premier League	14	1
PSV Eindhoven	1998–99	Eredivisie	4	1
PSV Eindhoven	2000–01	Eredivisie	5	0
PSV Eindhoven	2001–02	Eredivisie	25	2
PSV Eindhoven	2002–03	Eredivisie	8	1
Maccabi Haifa (loan)	1999–2000	Israeli Premier League	32	1
FC Twente	2003–04	Eredivisie	28	3
FC Twente	2004–05	Eredivisie	2	0
FC Twente	2005–06	Eredivisie	15	0
FC Twente	2006–07	Eredivisie	2	0
Metalurh Donetsk (loan)	2004–05	Vyscha Liha	2	0
Total			209	18
