= Aleksei Kozlov (footballer, born 1975) =

Russian footballer

Personal information
- Full name: Aleksei Vladimirovich Kozlov
- Date of birth: August 18, 1975 (age 51)
- Place of birth: Moscow, Russia
- Height: 1.80 m (5 ft 11 in)
- Position: Defender

Youth career
- Dynamo Moscow

Senior career*
Years	Team	Apps	(Gls)
1994–1998	Dynamo Moscow	4	(0)
1999	Uralan Elista	28	(0)
2000–2001	Dynamo Moscow	19	(0)
2002	Kuzbass-Dynamo Kemerovo	27	(0)
2003	Khimki	24	(0)
2004	Tom Tomsk	19	(0)
2005	Anzhi Makhachkala	34	(0)
2006	Sodovik Sterlitamak	29	(0)
2007	Salyut-Energia Belgorod	0	(0)
2008	MVD Rossii Moscow	31	(3)
- * Club domestic league appearances and goals

Aleksei Vladimirovich Kozlov (Russian: Алексей Владимирович Козлов; born 18 August 1975) is a former Russian footballer. He is the son of Vladimir Kozlov.
