= Aleksei Bakharev =

Ukrainian footballer (1976–2022)

Personal information
- Full name: Aleksei Aleksandrovich Bakharev
- Date of birth: 12 October 1976
- Place of birth: Petrov Val, Volgograd Oblast, Russian SFSR, Soviet Union (now Russia)
- Date of death: 18 March 2022 (aged 45)
- Place of death: Tolyatti, Russia
- Height: 1.73 m (5 ft 8 in)
- Position: Midfielder

Youth career
- Neftyanik Pokhvistnevo
- Lada Togliatti

Senior career*
Years	Team	Apps	(Gls)
1994–1997	Lada Togliatti	69	(7)
1997	→ Spartak Moscow (loan)	30	(2)
1998	Rotor Volgograd	15	(0)
1999–2006	Shakhtar Donetsk	124	(10)
1999–2005	→ Shakhtar-2 Donetsk	11	(5)
2005	→ Rubin Kazan (loan)	0	(0)
2006–2007	Lada Togliatti	29	(2)
2007	Nosta Novotroitsk	9	(2)
2008	Mashuk-KMV Pyatigorsk	5	(0)
2009	FSA Voronezh	2	(0)
Total		283	(23)

International career
1994	Russia U19	5	(0)
1995–1998	Russia U21	18	(4)
1998	Russia	1	(0)
2002	Ukraine	1	(0)
- * Club domestic league appearances and goals

Aleksei Aleksandrovich Bakharev (Russian: Алексей Александрович Бахарев, Ukrainian: Олексій Олександрович Бахарєв; 12 October 1976 – 18 March 2022) was a Russian and Ukrainian professional footballer who played as a midfielder.

== International career ==
Bakharev played for two national teams: he played for Russia on 18 November 1998 in a friendly against Brazil and for Ukraine on 21 August 2002 in a friendly against Iran.
