= Aleksandr Shirko =

Russian footballer and scout

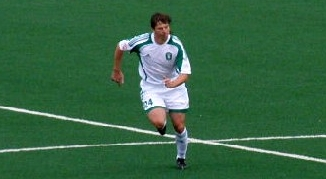
- Shirko in 2008

Personal information
- Full name: Aleksandr Petrovich Shirko
- Date of birth: 24 November 1976 (age 49)
- Place of birth: Moscow, Soviet Union
- Height: 1.79 m (5 ft 10 1/2 in)
- Position: Forward

Senior career*
Years	Team	Apps	(Gls)
1995–2001	Spartak Moscow	127	(40)
2001–2003	Torpedo Moscow	61	(22)
2004	Shinnik Yaroslavl	27	(7)
2005	Terek Grozny	3	(0)
2005–2006	Shinnik Yaroslavl	34	(6)
2007–2008	Tom Tomsk	28	(3)
2009	FC MVD Rossii Moscow	12	(1)
Total		292	(79)

International career
1994	Russia U-19	2	(0)
1996–1997	Russia U-21	9	(8)
1999–2001	Russia	6	(1)

Managerial career
- 2018–2021: Khimki (scout)
- 2018–2021: Academy Khimki (director)
- 2021–2024: SSh Olimp Fryazino (director)
- 2024: Academy Torpedo Moscow (director)
- * Club domestic league appearances and goals

Aleksandr Petrovich Shirko (Russian: Александр Петрович Ширко; born 24 November 1976) is a Russian football scout and a former player.

== Playing career ==
Shirko started his professional career with Spartak Moscow, with whom he won six Russian Premier League titles, from 1996 to 2001, and become one of the top scorers of the UEFA Cup in the 1997/1998 season, before leaving for city-rivals Torpedo.
In 2004 Shirko joined Shinnik Yaroslavl as part of a loan deal from Torpedo, but then extended his stay at the club by two years.
In 2006 Aleksandr Shirko was involved in a fight with Shinnik fans, after a disappointing 1–6 defeat to Rostov. That accident earned him a ten-match ban.
At the start of 2007, Shirko signed with Tom Tomsk, in club's attempt to replace Pavel Pogrebnyak, who left for Zenit Saint Petersburg.

Shirko scored 78 goals in 281 Russian league matches. Shirko won the 1997–98 Russian Cup with Spartak and was awarded Master of Sports of Russia.

During his professional career, Shirko earned six caps for Russia national football team from 1999 to 2001, scoring one goal in a 3–0 win over Faroe Islands in 2001.

== International goals ==
#	Date	Venue	Opponent	Score	Result	Competition
1	2001-09-05	Tórsvøllur, Tórshavn, Faroe Islands	Faroe Islands	0 – 3	0–3	2002 FIFA World Cup qualification
