= Luis Robson =

Brazilian footballer (born 1974)

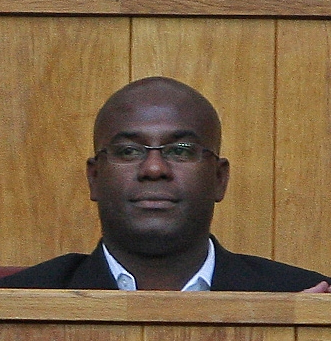

Personal information
- Full name: Robson Luis Pereira da Silva
- Date of birth: 21 September 1974 (age 52)
- Place of birth: Volta Redonda, Brazil
- Height: 1.83 m (6 ft 0 in)
- Position: Striker

Senior career*
Years	Team	Apps	(Gls)
1992–1993	Matsubara	0	(0)
1993–1994	Sorriso	0	(0)
1995	Mogi Mirim	0	(0)
1995–1996	Paraguaçuense	0	(0)
1996	Goiás	0	(0)
1996	Corinthians	16	(2)
1996–1997	Leiria	3	(0)
1997	Ferroviário	0	(0)
1997–2001	Spartak Moscow	102	(32)
2002	Consadole Sapporo	5	(0)
2003–2005	Lorient	70	(16)
2006	Marília	6	(2)
- * Club domestic league appearances and goals

Robson Luis Pereira da Silva (Volta Redonda, September 21, 1974), known as Luis Robson, is a former Brazilian footballer who played as a striker.

Robson began his professional career in Matsubara. He moved to Goiás in 1996. After spending a year at the club, he joined Corinthians on loan. Robson also had a period of one year with Leiria before moving to Russia, where he spent five years with Spartak Moscow, the most successful period in his career. During his time at Spartak he won five Russian Top League / Division titles and played in the Champions League. After leaving Spartak, Robson never rediscovered his best form and had short and unsuccessful spells in Japan and France, before returning to Brazil, where he played for Marilia. In 2006, his contract with Marilia expired and he ended his career.

== Honours ==
=== Club ===
Spartak Moscow

- Russian Top Division / League: 1997, 1998, 1999, 2000, 2001
- Russian Cup: 1998

=== Individual ===
- CIS Cup top goalscorer: 2000 (shared)
