= Volodymyr Herashchenko =

Ukrainian footballer and coach

Personal information
- Full name: Volodymyr Vasylyovych Herashchenko
- Date of birth: 27 April 1968 (age 58)
- Place of birth: Dnipropetrovsk, Ukrainian SSR
- Height: 1.90 m (6 ft 3 in)
- Position: Defender

Senior career*
Years	Team	Apps	(Gls)
1984–1990	Dnipro Dnipropetrovsk	43	(0)
1991–1998	Rotor Volgograd	188	(13)
1999	Amkar Perm	28	(1)
1999–2003	Dnipro Dnipropetrovsk	49	(5)
2001–2002	→ Dnipro-2 Dnipropetrovsk	7	(0)
2003–2004	Zorya Luhansk	8	(1)
Total		323	(20)

Managerial career
- 2004–2017: Dnipro (youth assistant)
- 2017–: Dnipro (assistant)
- * Club domestic league appearances and goals

Volodymyr Vasylyovych Herashchenko (Ukrainian: Володимир Васильович Геращенко, alternatively Vladimir Vasilyevich Gerashchenko, Russian: Владимир Васильевич Геращенко; born 27 April 1968) is a Ukrainian professional football coach and a former player.

== Career ==
He made his professional debut in the Soviet Top League in 1985 for Dnipro Dnipropetrovsk.

He became secretary general of the Ukrainian National Olympic Committee, but was suspended in May 2012 after being recorded offering a British newspaper reporter, posing as a tout, up to 100 Olympic tickets. He subsequently said he was 'humouring' the reporter and not really offering the tickets.

== Honours ==
- Soviet Top League champion: 1988.
- Soviet Top League runner-up: 1987, 1989.
- Soviet Top League bronze: 1985.
- Soviet Cup winner: 1989.
- USSR Super Cup winner: 1989.
- USSR Federation Cup winner: 1989.
- USSR Federation Cup finalist: 1990.
- Russian Premier League runner-up: 1993, 1997.
- Russian Premier League bronze: 1996.
- Russian Cup finalist: 1995.
- Ukrainian Premier League bronze: 2001.

== European club competitions ==
- UEFA Cup 1988–89 with FC Dnipro Dnipropetrovsk: 1 game.
- European Cup 1989–90 with FC Dnipro Dnipropetrovsk: 6 games.
- UEFA Cup 1990–91 with FC Dnipro Dnipropetrovsk: 2 games.
- UEFA Cup 1994–95 with FC Rotor Volgograd: 2 games, 1 goal.
- UEFA Cup 1995–96 with FC Rotor Volgograd: 3 games.
- UEFA Intertoto Cup 1996 with FC Rotor Volgograd: 3 games.
- UEFA Cup 1997–98 with FC Rotor Volgograd: 5 games.
- UEFA Cup 1998–99 with FC Rotor Volgograd: 2 games.
- UEFA Cup 2000–01 with FC Dnipro Dnipropetrovsk: 1 game.
