= Fikret Alomerović =

Macedonian footballer

Personal information
- Date of birth: December 3, 1970 (age 55)
- Place of birth: Skopje, SFR Yugoslavia
- Height: 1.84 m (6 ft 1/2 in)
- Position: Defender

Senior career*
Years	Team	Apps	(Gls)
- Skopje
- Radnički Niš
- Vardar
1996–1997	Sloga Jugomagnat		
1997	Torpedo-Luzhniki	13	(0)
1997–1998	Sloga Jugomagnat		
1999–2000	Gorica	27	(0)
2000–2001	Valur	26	(2)
2002	Víkingur	10	(0)
- * Club domestic league appearances and goals

Fikret Alomerović (Macedonian: Фикрет Аломеровиќ; born 3 December 1970) is a Macedonian former footballer.

== Club career ==
Born in Skopje, SR Macedonia, back then still within Yugoslavia, Alomerović played with FK Skopje, FK Radnički Niš, FK Vardar, FK Sloga Jugomagnat, FC Torpedo-Luzhniki Moscow, HIT Gorica, Valur and Víkingur.
