= Anatoli Kanishchev =

Russian footballer (born 1971)

Personal information
- Full name: Anatoli Anatolyevich Kanishchev
- Date of birth: 11 December 1971 (age 54)
- Place of birth: Voronezh, Russian SFSR
- Height: 1.89 m (6 ft 2 in)
- Position: Striker

Senior career*
| Years | Team | Apps | (Gls) |
| 1989 | FC Fakel Voronezh (reserves) | | |
| 1992–1993 | FC Gornyak | 59 | (16) |
| 1994–1995 | FC Torpedo Arzamas | 37 | (13) |
| 1995–1997 | FC Alania Vladikavkaz | 86 | (18) |
| 1998 | FC Spartak Moscow | 24 | (6) |
| 1999 | FC Alania Vladikavkaz | 11 | (2) |
| 1999 | FC Spartak Moscow | 1 | (0) |
| 2000 | FC Dynamo Moscow | 2 | (0) |
| 2000–2001 | FC Gazovik Ostrogozhsk | | |
| 2002 | FC Luch Vladivostok | 8 | (1) |
| 2002 | FC Lokomotiv Liski | 6 | (0) |

International career
| 1996–1997 | Russia | 3 | (0) |
- * Club domestic league appearances and goals

Anatoli Anatolyevich Kanishchev (Russian: Анатолий Анатольевич Канищев; born 11 December 1971) is a former Russian professional association footballer.

== Club career ==
He made his debut in the Russian Premier League in 1995 for FC Spartak-Alania Vladikavkaz.

== Honours ==
=== Club ===
- Russian Premier League champion: 1995, 1998, 1999.
- Russian Premier League runner-up: 1996.
- Kazakhstan Premier League bronze: 1993.
- Russian Cup winner: 1998.

=== Individual ===
- CIS Cup top goalscorer: 1998

== European club competitions ==
- 1995–96 UEFA Cup with FC Alania Vladikavkaz: 2 games.
- 1997–98 UEFA Champions League qualification with FC Alania Vladikavkaz: 1 game.
- 1996–97 UEFA Cup with FC Alania Vladikavkaz: 2 games.
- 1997–98 UEFA Cup with FC Alania Vladikavkaz: 4 games.
- 1998–99 UEFA Champions League with FC Spartak Moscow: 5 games.

== International career ==
He made his debut for Russia national football team on 1 September 1996 in the 1998 FIFA World Cup qualifier against Cyprus.
