= Nikolai Kashentsev =

Russian footballer

Personal information
- Full name: Nikolai Nikolayevich Kashentsev
- Date of birth: 19 July 1974 (age 52)
- Place of birth: Barnaul, Russian SFSR
- Height: 1.75 m (5 ft 9 in)
- Positions: Defender; midfielder; striker

Team information
- Current team: FC Khimik Dzerzhinsk (assistant coach)

Youth career
- FC Dynamo Barnaul

Senior career*
Years	Team	Apps	(Gls)
1991–1995	FC Dynamo Barnaul	139	(20)
1996–1999	FC Lokomotiv Nizhny Novgorod	101	(7)
2000	FC Zhemchuzhina Sochi	23	(0)
2001	FC Lokomotiv Nizhny Novgorod	9	(0)
2002	FC Svetotekhnika Saransk	1	(0)
2004–2005	FC Lokomotiv-NN Nizhny Novgorod	23	(0)
2006–2007	FJ Buxoro	29	(1)

Managerial career
- 2021–2022: FC Khimik Dzerzhinsk (caretaker)
- 2021–: FC Khimik Dzerzhinsk (assistant)
- * Club domestic league appearances and goals

Nikolai Nikolayevich Kashentsev (Russian: Николай Николаевич Кашенцев; born 19 July 1974) is a Russian professional football coach and a former player. He is an assistant coach of FC Khimik Dzerzhinsk.

== Club career ==
He made his professional debut in the Soviet Second League in 1991 for FC Dynamo Barnaul. He played 5 games in the UEFA Intertoto Cup 1997 for FC Lokomotiv Nizhny Novgorod.

== Personal life ==
He is a brother of Yevgeni Kashentsev.
