= Sergei Gorlukovich =

Russian footballer (born 1961)

Personal information
- Full name: Sergei Vadimovich Gorlukovich
- Date of birth: 18 November 1961 (age 64)
- Place of birth: Boruny, Gomel Oblast, Byelorussian SSR, Soviet Union
- Height: 1.85 m (6 ft 1 in)
- Position: Defender

Youth career
- SDYuShOR-7 Mogilev

Senior career*
Years	Team	Apps	(Gls)
1980	Torpedo Mogilev	–	(–)
1981–1984	Gomselmash Gomel	112	(21)
1985–1986	Dinamo Minsk	22	(0)
1986–1989	Lokomotiv Moscow	114	(11)
1989–1992	Borussia Dortmund	44	(1)
1992–1995	Bayer Uerdingen	80	(6)
1995	Spartak-Alania Vladikavkaz	5	(0)
1996–1998	Spartak Moscow	83	(5)
1999	Torpedo-ZIL Moscow	42	(5)
2000	Chkalovets-Olimpik Novosibirsk	22	(0)
2001	Lokomotiv Nizhny Novgorod	18	(0)
2002	Mika	2	(0)
Total		544	(49)

International career
1988	Soviet Union Olympic	9	(0)
1988–1991	Soviet Union	21	(1)
1993–1996	Russia	17	(0)

Managerial career
- 2002–2004: Spartak Moscow (scout)
- 2004: Saturn Ramenskoye (assistant)
- 2005–2006: SKA-Energia Khabarovsk
- 2007: Avangard Kursk
- 2008: Vityaz Podolsk
- 2009–2010: SKA-Energiya Khabarovsk
- 2013: Baikal Irkutsk
- 2014: Sochi
Medal record
Representing Soviet Union
Men's Football
Gold medal – first place	1988 Seoul	Team competition
- * Club domestic league appearances and goals

Sergei Vadimovich Gorlukovich (Russian: Серге́й Вадимович Горлукович; born 18 November 1961) is a football manager and former player who played as a defender. At the international level, he represented both the Soviet Union and the Russia national teams.

== Club career ==
In the final years of the Soviet Union, transfer regulations were relaxed, allowing Gorlukovich to move to West Germany during the winter of the 1989–90 season. He joined Borussia Dortmund as his first club in the Bundesliga.

== International career ==
In international football, Gorlukovich played at the 1990 FIFA World Cup, 1994 FIFA World Cup, and UEFA Euro 1996. He made his debut for the Soviet Union on 19 October 1988 in a 1990 FIFA World Cup qualifier against Austria. He scored his only international goal in a friendly match against Syria on 21 November 1988.

Gorlukovich is also known for a controversial incident in a 1990 friendly against the Netherlands in Kiev, where his tackle resulted in a serious injury to Marcel Peeper, effectively ending the Dutch player's international career.

== Honours ==
Borussia Dortmund

- Bundesliga runner-up: 1991–92

Spartak-Alania Vladikavkaz

- Russian Premier League: 1995

Spartak Moscow

- Russian Premier League: 1996, 1997, 1998
- Russian Cup: 1997–98

Soviet Union

- Summer Olympics: 1988
