= Andrei Krivov =

Russian footballer

Personal information
- Full name: Andrei Vladimirovich Krivov
- Date of birth: 24 September 1976 (age 50)
- Place of birth: Morshansk, Tambov Oblast, Soviet Union
- Height: 1.77 m (5 ft 10 in)
- Position: Midfielder

Senior career*
Years	Team	Apps	(Gls)
1992–2000	FC Rotor Volgograd	133	(11)
2000–2002	Gaziantepspor	24	(1)
2002–2004	FC Rotor Volgograd	42	(3)
2005	FC Khimki	2	(0)
2005	FC Ural Ekaterinburg	14	(0)

International career
1994	Russia U-19	1	(1)
1995	Russia U-20	4	(0)
1995–1998	Russia U-21	11	(0)

Managerial career
- 2010: FC Rotor Volgograd (commercial director)
- 2010: FC Rotor Volgograd (general director)
- * Club domestic league appearances and goals

Andrei Vladimirovich Krivov (Russian: Андрей Владимирович Кривов; born 24 September 1976) is a Russian professional football functionary and a former defensive midfielder who played for FC Rotor Volgograd in Russia and Gaziantepspor in the Turkish Süper Lig.

== Career stats ==
Season	Club	Country	Level	Apps	Goals
2005	FC Ural Ekaterinburg	Russia	II	14	0
2005	FC Khimki	Russia	II	2	0
2004	FC Rotor Volgograd	Russia	I	26	3
2003	FC Rotor Volgograd	Russia	I	6	0
2002	FC Rotor Volgograd	Russia	I	10	0
2001-02	Gaziantepspor	Turkey	I	7	0
2000–01	Gaziantepspor	Turkey	I	17	1
2000	FC Rotor Volgograd	Russia	I	28	3
1999	FC Rotor Volgograd	Russia	I	16	1
1998	FC Rotor Volgograd	Russia	I	27	3
1997	FC Rotor Volgograd	Russia	I	25	0
1996	FC Rotor Volgograd	Russia	I	6	1
1995	FC Rotor Volgograd	Russia	I	25	3
1994	FC Rotor Volgograd	Russia	I	6	0
1993	FC Rotor Volgograd	Russia	I	0	0
1992	FC Rotor Volgograd	Russia	I	0	0
