= Vladimir Skokov =

Russian footballer

Personal information
- Full name: Vladimir Borisovich Skokov
- Date of birth: 11 June 1972 (age 54)
- Place of birth: Kamensk-Shakhtinsky, Russian SFSR
- Height: 1.76 m (5 ft 9 1/2 in)
- Positions: Midfielder; striker

Team information
- Current team: FC Shinnik Yaroslavl (assistant coach)

Senior career*
Years	Team	Apps	(Gls)
1990–1991	FC Zarya Kaluga	69	(3)
1992–1993	FC Rostselmash Rostov-on-Don	6	(0)
1993–1996	FC Torpedo Taganrog	132	(26)
1997–1998	FC Dynamo Moscow	52	(5)
1999	FC Sokol Saratov	41	(6)
2000–2003	FC Shinnik Yaroslavl	106	(11)
2004	FC Terek Grozny	32	(1)
2005	FC Fakel Voronezh	39	(2)
2006	Ditton Daugavpils	22	(4)
2007	FC Shinnik Yaroslavl	34	(1)
2008	FC Metallurg Lipetsk	29	(8)

Managerial career
- 2009–2010: FC Saturn Ramenskoye (youth team assistant coach)
- 2011: Russia U-15 (assistant)
- 2011–2012: Russia U-16 (assistant)
- 2012–2013: Russia U-17 (assistant)
- 2013–2014: Russia U-18 (assistant)
- 2014–2015: Russia U-19 (assistant)
- 2015: Russia U-21 (assistant)
- 2017: Russia U-15 (assistant)
- 2017–2018: Russia U-16 (assistant)
- 2018–2019: Russia U-17 (assistant)
- 2020–2021: Chertanovo Education Center
- 2021–2022: FC Chertanovo Moscow (U-19)
- 2022–2023: FC Kaluga (assistant)
- 2023–: FC Shinnik Yaroslavl (assistant)
- * Club domestic league appearances and goals

Vladimir Borisovich Skokov (Russian: Владимир Борисович Скоков; born 11 June 1972) is a Russian professional football coach and a former player. He is an assistant manager with FC Shinnik Yaroslavl.

== Playing career ==
He made his professional debut in the Soviet Second League in 1990 for FC Zarya Kaluga.

== Coaching career ==
Skokov spent most of his coaching career as an assistant to Dmitri Khomukha in the youth national teams and clubs.

== Honours ==
- Russian Premier League bronze: 1997.
- Russian Cup winner: 2004.
- Russian Cup finalist: 1997, 1999 (played in the early stages of the 1998/99 tournament for FC Dynamo Moscow).

== European club competitions ==
- UEFA Intertoto Cup 1997 with FC Dynamo Moscow: 4 games.
- UEFA Cup 1998–99 with FC Dynamo Moscow: 2 games.
- UEFA Cup 2004–05 with FC Terek Grozny: 3 games.
