= Valery Kechinov =

Russian footballer

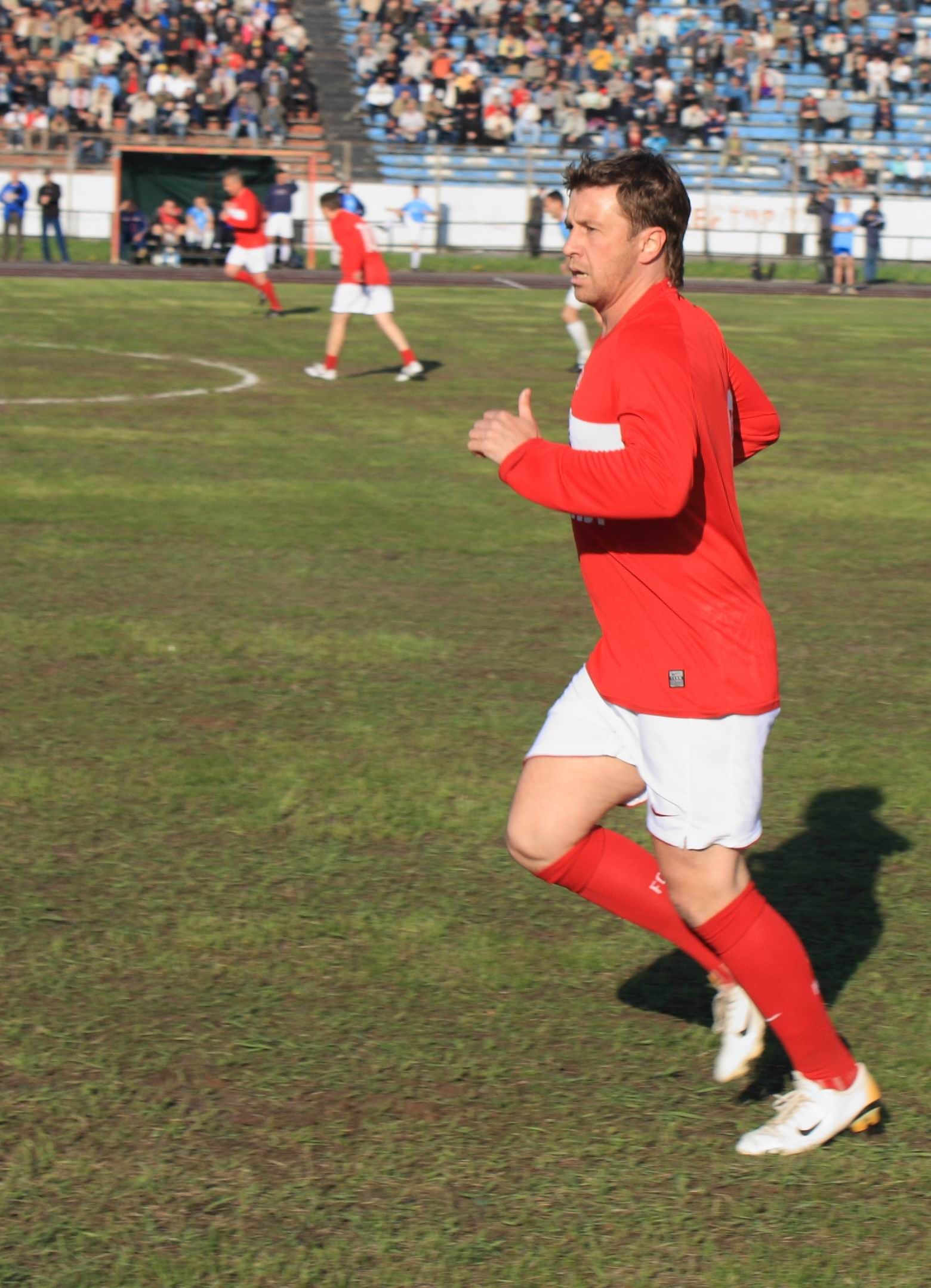

Personal information
- Full name: Valery Viktorovich Kechinov
- Date of birth: 5 August 1974 (age 52)
- Place of birth: Tashkent, Soviet Union
- Height: 1.79 m (5 ft 10 in)
- Position: Midfielder

Senior career*
Years	Team	Apps	(Gls)
1992–1993	Pakhtakor Tashkent	38	(30)
1993–2000	Spartak Moscow	115	(36)
2001	Saturn	24	(9)
2002–2004	Shinnik Yaroslavl	54	(11)

International career
1994–1995	Russia U21	10	(2)
1992	Uzbekistan	3	(0)
1994–1998	Russia	6	(2)
- * Club domestic league appearances and goals

Valery Viktorovich Kechinov (Russian: Валерий Викторович Кечинов; born 5 August 1974) is a former international footballer, who played as a midfielder. He spent the majority of his playing career at Spartak Moscow. Born in Uzbekistan, he was an Uzbek and Russian international.

== Playing career ==
Kechinov was born in Uzbekistan and started his professional career at local Pakhtakor, with whom he won the Uzbek League title, before moving to Moscow. With Spartak, Kechinov won six Russian Premier League titles and one Cup.

In 2001, after falling out with Oleg Romantsev, Kechinov spent almost entire season on the bench and at the end of the season signed a deal with Saturn Ramenskoe. Kechinov wasn't the only player to have problems with the Spartak management at that time, earlier other star players such as Ilia Tsymbalar, Andrey Tikhonov, Sergey Yuran, Ramiz Mamedov and Evgeniy Bushmanov were forced to leave the team for similar reasons.

After a brief spell at Saturn, Kechinov moved to Shinnik, where he spent the next three years of his career, until retiring in 2004.

== Managing career ==
He worked as Spartak Moscow reserve coach in 2006–2008, assisting Miroslav Romaschenko. In June 2008, Romaschenko left to manage Tom Tomsk, and Kechinov followed him to an assistant manager role. He was fired from Tom along with Romaschenko on 4 September 2008 after a string of bad results.

== Career statistics ==
=== International goals ===
No.	Date	Venue	Opponent	Score	Result	Competition
1	6 April 1995	Luzhniki Stadium, Moscow, Russia	Faroe Islands	1–0	3–0	UEFA Euro 1996 qualifying
2	30 April 1997	Central Dynamo Stadium, Moscow, Russia	Luxembourg	1–0	3–0	1998 FIFA World Cup qualification

== Honours ==
=== Player ===
Pakhtakor

- Uzbek League: 1992

Spartak

- Russian Premier League: 1993, 1994, 1996, 1997, 1998, 1999, 2000
- Russian Cup: 1993/1994
- Russian Cup runner-up: 1995/1996

Individual

- Uzbekistan Footballer of the Year: 1992
- Uzbek League Top Scorer: 1992 (24 goals)
- The best 33 football players of Russia: 1997

=== Manager ===
Spartak

- Russian Reserve Championship: 2006, 2007
