= FC Torpedo-2 =

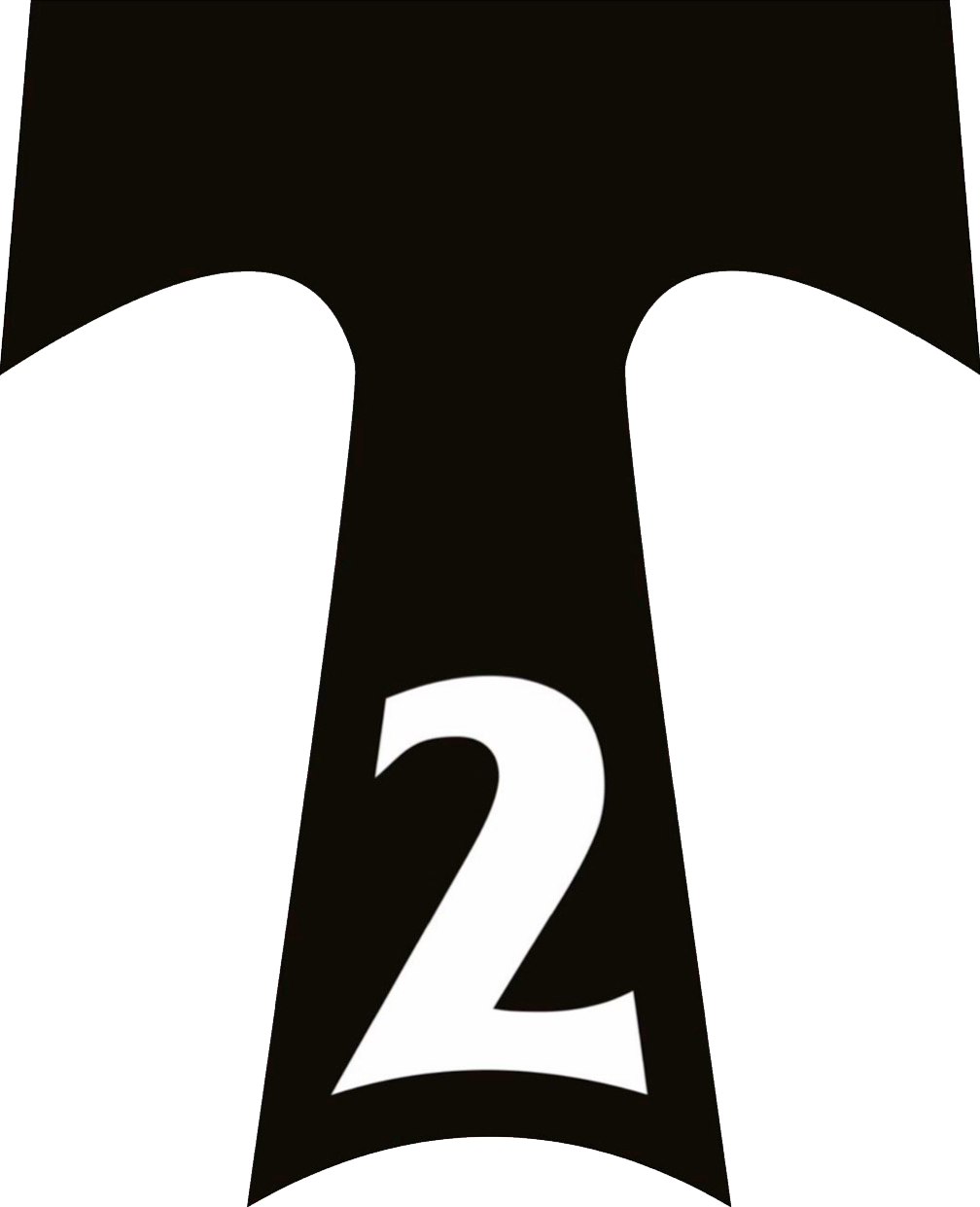
- Full name: Футбольный клуб Торпедо-2 (Football Club Torpedo-2)
- Founded: January 26, 2022; 3 years ago
- Dissolved: January 26, 2024; 14 months ago
- Ground: Salyut Stadium, Dolgoprudny Spartak Moscow Cherenkov Academy Stadium (reserve) Avangard Stadium, Domodedovo (reserve)
- Capacity: 3000
- 2023: Second League, Division B, Group 2, 18th (relegated)
- Website: https://torpedo.ru/teams/team2/
Home colours	Away colours	Third colours

FC Torpedo-2 (Russian: ФК «Торпедо-2») was a Russian football team from Moscow, founded in 2022. It was a farm club for the team FC Torpedo Moscow.

== History ==
In the Russian championships in 1992–2000, the Torpedo-d team participated in the second and third leagues and the first two draws of the Russian Cup.

On January 26, 2022, the Board of Directors of Torpedo Moscow decided to revive the farm club for its further participation in Russian Football National League 2. The team was disbanded in January 2024.
