= 1997 Russian Third League =

Russian football league season

Russian Third League
- Season: 1997

The 1997 Russian Third League was the 4th and, so far, final time competition on the fourth level of Russian football was professional. In 1998 Russian Third League was disbanded and the Amateur Football League moved back to fourth level of the Russian football pyramid. All the 1997 Russian Third League teams that were not promoted to the Second Division moved to the Amateur Football League (unless otherwise noted below). There were 5 zones with 88 teams starting the competition (6 were excluded before the end of the season).

== Zone 1 ==
=== Overview ===
Team	Head coach
FC Lokomotiv Mineralnye Vody	Aleksandr Babayan
FC Mozdok	Yuri Gazzaev
FC Torpedo Georgiyevsk	Yuri Kotov
FC Anzhi-d Makhachkala	
FC Nart Nartkala	Vladimir Kurashinov
FC Iriston Vladikavkaz	Ruslan Merdenov
FC Nart Cherkessk	Nurbiy Lakhov
FC Dynamo-d Stavropol	
FC Alania-d Vladikavkaz	
PFC Spartak-d Nalchik	
FC Dynamo-Imamat Makhachkala	Kosim Akchurin
FC Olimp Kislovodsk	Aleksandr Grosberg
FC Beshtau Lermontov	Valentin Lobachyov

=== Standings ===
Pos	Team	Pld	W	D	L	GF	GA	GD	Pts	Promotion
1	Lokomotiv Mineralnye Vody (A)	48	33	11	4	112	40	+72	110	Promotion to Second Division
2	Mozdok (A)	48	29	8	11	105	46	+59	95	Promotion to Second Division
3	Torpedo Georgiyevsk (A)	48	28	9	11	85	36	+49	93	Promotion to Second Division
4	Anzhi-d Makhachkala	48	29	5	14	114	58	+56	92	
5	Nart Nartkala (A)	48	27	6	15	109	74	+35	87	Promotion to Second Division
6	Iriston Vladikavkaz (A)	48	25	9	14	98	63	+35	84	Promotion to Second Division
7	Nart Cherkessk (A)	48	21	7	20	83	80	+3	70	Promotion to Second Division
8	Dynamo-d Stavropol	48	15	14	19	69	76	−7	59	
9	Alania-d Vladikavkaz (A)	48	12	7	29	66	119	−53	43	Promotion to Second Division
10	Spartak-d Nalchik	48	11	10	27	65	99	−34	43	
11	Dynamo-Imamat Makhachkala (A)	48	12	6	30	67	131	−64	42	Promotion to Second Division
12	Olimp Kislovodsk	48	11	7	30	54	116	−62	40	
13	Beshtau Lermontov (A)	48	7	5	36	50	139	−89	26	Promotion to Second Division

Source: RSSSF
(A) Advance to a further round

Notes.

1. FC Alania-d Vladikavkaz were excluded from the league after playing 35 games and gaining 43 points. Opponents were awarded a 3–0 win in the remaining games.
2. FC Iriston Vladikavkaz and FC Dynamo-Imamat Makhachkala were awarded 1 home win each.
3. FC Torpedo Georgiyevsk played their first professional season.
4. FC Anzhi-2 Kaspiysk renamed to FC Anzhi-d and moved to Makhachkala. They did not participate in national-level competitions in 1998.
5. FC Dynamo-d Stavropol, PFC Spartak-d Nalchik and FC Olimp Kislovodsk did not participate in national-level competitions in 1998.
6. FC Alania-d Vladikavkaz last played professionally in 1995 as FC Spartak-Alania-d Vladikavkaz.

=== Top goalscorers ===
35 goals

- Budun Budunov (FC Anzhi-d Makhachkala)

30 goals

- Kyamran Nurakhmedov (FC Dynamo-Imamat Makhachkala)

28 goals

- Alisher Gippot (FC Torpedo Georgiyevsk)

26 goals

- Aslan Maremukov (FC Nart Nartkala)

25 goals

- Nikolai Tkachenko (FC Lokomotiv Mineralnye Vody)

24 goals

- Eduard Khachaturyan (FC Mozdok)

22 goals

- Mikhail Pavlov (FC Lokomotiv Mineralnye Vody)
- (Georgia (country)) Aleksandr Zaalishvili (FC Nart Nartkala)

21 goals

- Gadzhi Bamatov (FC Anzhi-d Makhachkala)
- Iosif Khuazhev (FC Mozdok)

== Zone 2 ==
=== Overview ===
Team	Head coach
FC Kuban Slavyansk-na-Kubani	Nikolai Smirnov
FC Rassvet Troitskoye	Sergei Lushchin
FC Rostselmash-d Rostov-on-Don	
FC Spartak-Bratskiy Yuzhny	Sergei Antonkin
FC Niva Slavyansk-na-Kubani	Oleg Ivanov
FC Shakhtyor Shakhty	Yuri Shikunov
FC Volgodonsk	Nikolai Zlobin
FC Metallurg Krasny Sulin	Viktor Shchirov
FC Rotor-d Volgograd	
FC Salyut Saratov	Vladimir Khoroltsev
FC Kuban-d Krasnodar	Igor Kaleshin
FC Rotor-2 Mikhaylovka	Sergei Andreyev
FC Lokomotiv Yelets	Yuri Raznov
FC Zhemchuzhina-d Sochi	Anatoli Lyz
FC Energiya-d Kamyshin	Oleg Sizov
FC Fakel-d Voronezh	Yuri Litvinov

=== Standings ===
Pos	Team	Pld	W	D	L	GF	GA	GD	Pts	Promotion
1	Kuban Slavyansk-na-Kubani (A)	30	20	4	6	63	30	+33	64	Promotion to Second Division
2	Rassvet Troitskoye	30	17	7	6	56	30	+26	58	
3	Rostselmash-d Rostov-on-Don (A)	30	16	9	5	52	18	+34	57	Promotion to Second Division
4	Spartak-Bratskiy Yuzhny	30	17	5	8	62	36	+26	56	
5	Niva Slavyansk-na-Kubani	30	16	5	9	58	35	+23	53	
6	Shakhtyor Shakhty (A)	30	14	6	10	40	27	+13	48	Promotion to Second Division
7	Volgodonsk	30	12	8	10	40	33	+7	44	
8	Metallurg Krasny Sulin	30	11	10	9	38	36	+2	43	
9	Rotor-d Volgograd (A)	30	12	6	12	44	43	+1	42	Promotion to Second Division
10	Salyut Saratov (A)	30	10	10	10	43	36	+7	40	Promotion to Second Division
11	Kuban-d Krasnodar	30	11	5	14	28	40	−12	38	
12	Rotor-2 Mikhaylovka	30	9	9	12	37	33	+4	36	
13	Lokomotiv Yelets	28	11	1	16	32	50	−18	34	
14	Zhemchuzhina-d Sochi (A)	30	9	6	15	38	55	−17	33	Promotion to Second Division
15	Energiya-d Kamyshin	28	2	3	23	13	79	−66	9	
16	Fakel-d Voronezh	28	1	4	23	15	78	−63	7	

Source: RSSSF
(A) Advance to a further round

Notes.

1. FC Lokomotiv Yelets were excluded from the league after playing 15 games and gaining 34 points. Opponents were awarded a 3–0 win in the remaining games.
2. FC Energiya-d Kamyshin were excluded from the league after playing 15 games and gaining 9 points. Opponents were awarded a 3–0 win in the remaining games.
3. FC Fakel-d Voronezh was excluded from the league after playing 17 games and gaining 7 points. Opponents were awarded a 3–0 win in the remaining games.
4. FC Rassvet Troitskoye promoted from the Amateur Football League. They did not participate in the national-level competitions in 1998.
5. FC Spartak-Bratskiy Yuzhny, FC Niva Slavyansk-na-Kubani, FC Volgodonsk and FC Kuban-d Krasnodar did not participate in the national-level competitions in 1998.
6. FC Dynamo Mikhailovka renamed to FC Rotor-2.
7. FC Energiya-d Kamyshin last played professionally in 1992 as FC Tekstilshchik-d Kamyshin. They did not participate in the national-level competitions in 1998.
8. FC Fakel-d Voronezh played their first professional season. They did not participate in the national-level competitions in 1998.

=== Top goalscorers ===
16 goals

- Murat Gomleshko (FC Niva Slavyansk-na-Kubani)
- Viktor Ledovskikh (FC Spartak-Bratskiy Yuzhny)
- Denis Popov (FC Kuban Slavyansk-na-Kubani)

15 goals

- Gennadi Remezov (FC Rassvet Troitskoye)

11 goals

- Aleksandr Bocharnikov (FC Kuban Slavyansk-na-Kubani)
- Sergei Glazunov (FC Salyut Saratov)
- Valeri Prokulatov (FC Volgodonsk)

10 goals

- Sergei Afanasyev (FC Metallurg Krasny Sulin)
- Roman Oreshchuk (FC Rostselmash-d Rostov-on-Don)
- Sergei Pogarchenko (FC Shakhtyor Shakhty)

== Zone 3 ==
=== Overview ===
Team	Head coach
FC Dynamo-d Moscow	Aleksei Petrushin
FC Khimki	Vladimir Shtapov
FC Torpedo-ZIL Moscow	Sergei Petrenko
FC Kosmos Dolgoprudny	Aleksandr Logunov
FC Roda Moscow	Vladimir Opochinskiy
FC Spartak-d Moscow	Sergey Rodionov
FC Titan Reutov	Aleksei Belenkov
PFC CSKA-d Moscow	Sergei Berezin
FC Sportakademklub Moscow	Aleksandr Yefremov
FC Kolomna	Viktor Korneyev
FC Spartak Lukhovitsy	Sergei Bondar
FC Monolit Moscow	Yuri Vereykin
FC Torgmash Lyubertsy	Anatoli Leshchenkov
FC Krasnogvardeyets Moscow	Aleksandr Rakov
FC Asmaral Moscow	Vladimir Mikhaylov
FC Torpedo-Luzhniki-d Moscow	
FC Lokomotiv-d Moscow	Nikolai Khudiyev
FC Fabus Bronnitsy	Vladimir Sautin
FC MEPhI Moscow	Rinat Bilyaletdinov
FC Dynamo-2 Moscow	Aleksandr Maksimenkov
FC Chertanovo Moscow	Viktor Borovikov

=== Standings ===
Pos	Team	Pld	W	D	L	GF	GA	GD	Pts	Promotion
1	Dynamo-d Moscow (A)	40	31	4	5	84	24	+60	97	Promotion to Second Division
2	Khimki (A)	40	26	6	8	80	38	+42	84	Promotion to Second Division
3	Torpedo-ZIL Moscow (A)	40	23	8	9	77	29	+48	77	Promotion to Second Division
4	Kosmos Dolgoprudny (A)	40	21	8	11	63	41	+22	71	Promotion to Second Division
5	Roda Moscow	40	23	7	10	83	49	+34	70	
6	Spartak-d Moscow (A)	40	21	3	16	72	54	+18	66	Promotion to Second Division
7	Titan Reutov (A)	40	19	7	14	57	52	+5	64	Promotion to Second Division
8	CSKA-d Moscow (A)	40	17	12	11	66	53	+13	63	Promotion to Second Division
9	Sportakademklub Moscow (A)	40	17	8	15	58	47	+11	59	Promotion to Second Division
10	Kolomna (A)	40	15	12	13	49	40	+9	57	Promotion to Second Division
11	Spartak Lukhovitsy (A)	40	17	5	18	59	53	+6	56	Promotion to Second Division
12	Monolit Moscow (A)	40	15	8	17	57	70	−13	53	Promotion to Second Division
13	Torgmash Lyubertsy (A)	40	13	9	18	42	61	−19	48	Promotion to Second Division
14	Krasnogvardeyets Moscow	40	13	8	19	43	61	−18	47	
15	Asmaral Moscow (A)	40	14	3	23	50	77	−27	45	Promotion to Second Division
16	Torpedo-Luzhniki-d Moscow (A)	40	13	6	21	56	58	−2	45	Promotion to Second Division
17	Lokomotiv-d Moscow (A)	40	12	7	21	52	73	−21	43	Promotion to Second Division
18	Fabus Bronnitsy (A)	40	10	13	17	52	57	−5	43	Promotion to Second Division
19	MEPhI Moscow	40	11	9	20	40	53	−13	42	
20	Dynamo-2 Moscow	40	10	9	21	50	83	−33	39	
21	Chertanovo Moscow	40	1	4	35	18	135	−117	7	

Source: RSSSF
(A) Advance to a further round

Notes.

1. FC Roda Moscow deducted 6 points.
2. FC Khimki and FC Spartak Lukhovitsy promoted from the Amateur Football League.
3. FC Torpedo-ZIL Moscow played their first professional season.
4. FC Roda Moscow and FC Chertanovo Moscow did not participate in the national-level competitions in 1998.
5. FC Mashinostroitel Sergiyev Posad moved to Moscow and renamed to FC Sportakademklub.
6. FC Avangard-Kortek Kolomna renamed to FC Kolomna.
7. FC MEPhI Moscow promoted from the Amateur Football League, where it played in 1996 as FSh MEPhI. They did not participate in the national-level competitions in 1998.
8. FC Dynamo-2 Moscow did not participate in the national-level competitions in 1998 (FC Dynamo-d Moscow was renamed to FC Dynamo-2 in 1998).

=== Top goalscorers ===
21 goals

- Sergei Kulichenko (PFC CSKA-d Moscow)

20 goals

- Viktor Voronkov (FC Roda Moscow)

19 goals

- Sergei Lutovinov (FC Spartak-d Moscow)

17 goals

- Sabir Khamzin (FC Sportakademklub Moscow)
- Sergei Kravchuk (FC Khimki)
- Sergei Lavrentyev (FC Torpedo-ZIL Moscow)

16 goals

- Sergei Artyomov (FC Dynamo-d Moscow)
- Gleb Panfyorov (FC Torpedo-ZIL Moscow)
- Aleksei Snigiryov (FC Lokomotiv-d Moscow/FC Torpedo-ZIL Moscow)

15 goals

- (Cameroon) Guy-Martin Ngaha Tchamoah (FC Roda Moscow)
- Aleksandr Rogachyov (FC Kolomna)
- Vadim Shatalin (FC Khimki)

== Zone 4 ==
=== Overview ===
Team	Head coach
FC Metallurg Vyksa	Mikhail Beketov
FC Energetik Uren	Viktor Pavlyukov
FC Torpedo Vladimir	Yevgeni Skomorokhov
FC Torpedo-Viktoriya Nizhny Novgorod	Aleksandr Platonychev
FC Spartak Bryansk	Viktor Ozhoga
FC Stroitel Morshansk	Vyacheslav Vlasov
FC Luch Tula	Yuri Cheryevskiy
FC Lokomotiv Kaluga	Aleksandr Sakharov
FC Energiya Velikiye Luki	Vladimir Gogin
FC Volochanin Vyshny Volochyok	Viktor Demidov
FC Zenit-d Saint Petersburg	
FC Mashinostroitel Pskov	Sergei Markelov
FC Dynamo Bryansk	Viktor Zimin
FC Neftyanik Yaroslavl	Valentin Volkov
FC Spartak Kostroma	Valeri Volchanovskiy
FC Lokomotiv-d Saint Petersburg	
FC Lokomotiv-d Nizhny Novgorod	
FC Khimik Dzerzhinsk	Andrei Sergeyev
FC Industriya Borovsk	Yuri Karamyan
FC Spartak Rybnoye	

=== Standings ===
Pos	Team	Pld	W	D	L	GF	GA	GD	Pts	Promotion
1	Metallurg Vyksa	36	24	7	5	54	20	+34	79	
2	Energetik Uren (A)	36	23	7	6	70	35	+35	76	Promotion to Second Division
3	Torpedo Vladimir (A)	36	21	10	5	60	27	+33	73	Promotion to Second Division
4	Torpedo-Viktoriya Nizhny Novgorod (A)	36	21	7	8	62	18	+44	70	Promotion to Second Division
5	Spartak Bryansk (A)	36	17	10	9	54	38	+16	61	Promotion to Second Division
6	Stroitel Morshansk (A)	36	19	2	15	53	42	+11	59	Promotion to Second Division
7	Luch Tula (A)	36	17	7	12	41	37	+4	58	Promotion to Second Division
8	Lokomotiv Kaluga (A)	36	16	6	14	56	47	+9	54	Promotion to Second Division
9	Energiya Velikiye Luki (A)	36	13	14	9	43	36	+7	53	Promotion to Second Division
10	Volochanin Vyshny Volochyok (A)	36	14	8	14	33	40	−7	50	Promotion to Second Division
11	Zenit-d St. Petersburg (A)	36	12	13	11	49	32	+17	49	Promotion to Second Division
12	Mashinostroitel Pskov	36	13	7	16	28	40	−12	46	
13	Dynamo Bryansk (A)	36	13	7	16	38	42	−4	46	Promotion to Second Division
14	Neftyanik Yaroslavl (A)	36	12	8	16	41	46	−5	44	Promotion to Second Division
15	Spartak Kostroma (A)	36	10	8	18	30	48	−18	38	Promotion to Second Division
16	Lokomotiv-d St. Petersburg	36	8	7	21	28	57	−29	31	
17	Lokomotiv-d Nizhny Novgorod	36	6	6	24	24	61	−37	24	
18	Khimik Dzerzhinsk (A)	36	4	8	24	18	64	−46	20	Promotion to Second Division
19	Industriya Borovsk	36	4	8	24	21	73	−52	20	

Source: RSSSF
(A) Advance to a further round

Notes.

1. FC Spartak Rybnoye were excluded from the league after playing 18 games and gaining 14 points. All their results were discarded. That was their first professional season. They did not participate in the national-level competitions in 1998.
2. FC Industriya Borovsk were excluded from the league after playing 19 games and gaining 20 points. Opponents were awarded 3-0 wins in the remaining games. They did not participate in the national-level competitions in 1998.
3. FC Khimik Dzerzhinsk awarded one home loss.
4. FC Torpedo-Viktoriya Nizhny Novgorod played their first professional season.
5. FC Lokomotiv Kaluga promoted from the Amateur Football League, where they played in 1996 as FC Smena-PRMZ Kaluga.
6. FC Energiya Velikiye Luki promoted from the Amateur Football League.
7. FC Lokomotiv-d Saint Petersburg and FC Lokomotiv-d Nizhny Novgorod did not participate in the national-level competitions in 1998.

=== Top goalscorers ===
18 goals

- Nikolai Sidorov (FC Lokomotiv Kaluga)

17 goals

- Valeri Korneyev (FC Spartak Bryansk)

14 goals

- Andrei Alenichev (FC Energiya Velikiye Luki)
- Dmitri Golubev (FC Metallurg Vyksa)

13 goals

- Yevgeni Losev (FC Lokomotiv Kaluga)
- Dmitri Pozhidayev (FC Energetik Uren)

12 goals

- Anatoli Lychagov (FC Energetik Uren)
- Nail Safayev (FC Torpedo Vladimir)
- Valeri Vasilyev (FC Stroitel Morshansk)

11 goals

- Aleksandr Gultyayev (FC Mashinostroitel Pskov)
- Vladislav Khakhalev (FC Torpedo Vladimir)

== Zone 5 ==
=== Overview ===
Team	Head coach
FC Zenit Penza	Aleksandr Komissarov
FC Dynamo Perm	Viktor Arkhapchev
FC Zenit Chelyabinsk	Oleg Kudelin
FC Metiznik Magnitogorsk	Aleksandr Kukushkin
FC Neftyanik Pokhvistnevo	Yevgeni Sarychev (until July); Ishtvan Sekech (from July)
FC Uralets Nizhny Tagil	Anatoli Garenskikh
FC Biokhimik-Mordovia Saransk	Igor Shinkarenko
FC Energiya Ulyanovsk	Mikhail Fursenko
FC Gazovik Orenburg	Valeri Bogdanov
FC Trubnik Kamensk-Uralsky	Vasili Petrovich
FC Iskra Engels	Anatoli Surovtsev
FC Progress Zelenodolsk	Aleksandr Klobukov
FC Druzhba Yoshkar-Ola	Igor Pochuyenkov]
FC Neftyanik Bugulma	German Bobek
FC Elektron Vyatskiye Polyany	Yuri Osin
FC Gornyak Kachkanar	Viktor Stavrov
FC Volga Balakovo	Aleksandr Krokhin
FC KAMAZ-Chally-d Naberezhnye Chelny	

=== Standings ===
Pos	Team	Pld	W	D	L	GF	GA	GD	Pts	Promotion
1	Zenit Penza (A)	34	21	8	5	62	27	+35	71	Promotion to Second Division
2	Dynamo Perm (A)	34	20	6	8	55	32	+23	66	Promotion to Second Division
3	Zenit Chelyabinsk (A)	34	19	9	6	55	27	+28	66	Promotion to Second Division
4	Metiznik Magnitogorsk	34	18	7	9	65	44	+21	61	
5	Neftyanik Pokhvistnevo (A)	34	17	8	9	59	32	+27	59	Promotion to Second Division
6	Uralets Nizhny Tagil (A)	34	17	8	9	41	27	+14	59	Promotion to Second Division
7	Biokhimik-Mordovia Saransk (A)	34	16	11	7	47	28	+19	59	Promotion to Second Division
8	Energiya Ulyanovsk (A)	34	18	3	13	50	42	+8	57	Promotion to Second Division
9	Gazovik Orenburg (A)	34	16	9	9	48	33	+15	57	Promotion to Second Division
10	Trubnik Kamensk-Uralsky (A)	34	15	8	11	53	43	+10	53	Promotion to Second Division
11	Iskra Engels (A)	34	14	9	11	41	39	+2	51	Promotion to Second Division
12	Progress Zelenodolsk (A)	34	11	9	14	46	56	−10	42	Promotion to Second Division
13	Druzhba Yoshkar-Ola (A)	34	10	7	17	42	50	−8	37	Promotion to Second Division
14	Neftyanik Bugulma	34	8	9	17	35	54	−19	33	
15	Elektron Vyatskiye Polyany	34	7	7	20	33	62	−29	28	
16	Gornyak Kachkanar	34	5	8	21	33	65	−32	23	
17	Volga Balakovo (A)	34	5	5	24	32	73	−41	20	Promotion to Second Division
18	KAMAZ-Chally-d Naberezhnye Chelny	34	1	5	28	24	87	−63	8	

Source: RSSSF
(A) Advance to a further round

Notes.

1. FC Zenit Chelyabinsk and FC Energiya Ulyanovsk promoted from the Amateur Football League.
2. FC Metiznik Magnitogorsk, FC Elektron Vyatskiye Polyany, and FC KAMAZ-Chally-d Naberezhnye Chelny did not participate in the national-level competitions in 1998.

=== Top goalscorers ===
23 goals

- Vyacheslav Ulitin (FC Zenit Penza)

21 goals

- Vyacheslav Khovanskiy (FC Trubnik Kamensk-Uralsky)

19 goals

- Andrei Eskov (FC Iskra Engels)

17 goals

- Pavel Yumatov (FC Neftyanik Pokhvistnevo)

16 goals

- Aleksandr Fedoseyev (FC Zenit Penza)

15 goals

- Sergei Sviridkin (FC Gazovik Orenburg)

14 goals

- Aleksandr Fyodorov (FC Progress Zelenodolsk)
- Aleksandr Nikulin (FC Neftyanik Pokhvistnevo)
- Yuri Petrov (FC Dynamo Perm)

13 goals

- Igor Shiropatin (FC Uralets Nizhny Tagil)

== See also ==
- 1997 Russian Top League
- 1997 Russian First League
- 1997 Russian Second League
