= 1995–96 Russian Cup =

Tournament details
- Country: Russia

Final positions
- Champions: Lokomotiv Moscow
- Runners-up: Spartak Moscow

The 1995–96 Russian Cup was the fourth season of the Russian football knockout tournament since the dissolution of Soviet Union.

== First round ==
Team 1	Score	Team 2
8 April 1995
Torgmash Lyubertsy	2–3 (a.e.t.)	Mashinostroitel Sergiyev Posad
Avtomobilist Noginsk	w/o	Rekord Aleksandrov
Don Novomoskovsk	1–0	Arsenal Tula
Trubnik Kamensk-Uralsky	w/o	Vyatka Kirov
KamAZavtotsentr Naberezhnye Chelny	w/o	Progress Zelenodolsk
Titan Reutov	2–1	Monolit Moscow
TRASKO Moscow	0–1	Mosenergo Moscow
Dynamo-2 Moscow	3–1	Torpedo Mytishchi
22 April 1995
Avangard Kursk	1–0	FC Oryol
Tekstilshchik Isheyevka	w/o	Svetotekhnika Saransk
Kristall Sergach	4–2	Khimik Dzerzhinsk
Spartak Alagir	0–1	Iriston Mozdok
Spartak-Bratskiy Yuzhny	2–2 (a.e.t.) (4–3 p)	FC Volgodonsk
Shakhtyor Shakhty	1–2	Istochnik Rostov-on-Don
Dynamo Perm	1–1 (a.e.t.) (6–7 p)	Energiya Chaykovsky
26 April 1995
Metallurg Vyksa	2–2 (a.e.t.) (4–3 p)	Torpedo Pavlovo
Lokomotiv Mineralnye Vody	w/o	Angusht Malgobek
Olimp Kislovodsk	0–1	Kavkazkabel Prokhladny
Avtozapchast Baksan	3–2	Spartak Nalchik
Beshtau Lermontov	1–2	Avtodor-BMK Vladikavkaz
Zenit Penza	3–0	SKD Samara
Salyut Saratov	w/o	Devon Oktyabrsky
Gazovik Orenburg	1–3 (a.e.t.)	UralAZ Miass
Metiznik Magnitogorsk	1–0	Sibir Kurgan
Sodovik Sterlitamak	0–1	Nosta Novotroitsk
Agidel Ufa	w/o	Metallurg Magnitogorsk
Kraneks Ivanovo	w/o	Torpedo Vladimir
Astrateks Astrakhan	3–6 (a.e.t.)	Volgar-Gazprom Astrakhan
Metallurg Krasny Sulin	2–1	SKA Rostov-on-Don
Niva Slavyansk-na-Kubani	2–1 (a.e.t.)	Gekris Anapa
Kuban Slavyansk-na-Kubani	0–1	Venets Gulkevichi
Torpedo Armavir	0–1	Kuban Krasnodar
Gornyak-Vanadiy Kachkanar	1–0	Zvezda Perm
Elektron Vyatskiye Polyany	w/o	Gazovik-Gazprom Izhevsk
27 April 1995
Zenit Izhevsk	1–0	Rubin Kazan
3 May 1995
Metallurg Pikalyovo	2–4	Prometey-Dynamo Saint Petersburg
Turbostroitel Kaluga	1–0	Dynamo Bryansk

== Second round ==
Team 1	Score	Team 2
5 May 1995
Irtysh Tobolsk	3–1	Samotlor-XXI Nizhnevartovsk
Dynamo Omsk	1–4	Irtysh Omsk
6 May 1995
Mashinostroitel Sergiyev Posad	0–1	GFC Orekhovo
Avtomobilist Noginsk	2–0	Spartak Shchyolkovo
Avangard Kursk	2–1	Salyut Belgorod
Zenit Izhevsk	0–2	Lada Dimitrovgrad
Yudzhin Samara	w/o	Svetotekhnika Saransk
Metallurg Vyksa	0–0 (a.e.t.) (3–4 p)	Kristall Sergach
Prometey-Dynamo Saint Petersburg	1–2	FC Gatchina
Mashinostroitel Pskov	2–1	CSK VVS-Kristall Smolensk
Don Novomoskovsk	3–0	Spartak Ryazan
Turbostroitel Kaluga	3–1 (a.e.t.)	Industriya Obninsk
Kavkazkabel Prokhladny	1–2 (a.e.t.)	Angusht Malgobek
Iriston Mozdok	1–0	Avtozapchast Baksan
Avtodor-BMK Vladikavkaz	3–1	Spartak-Bratskiy Yuzhny
Salyut Saratov	2–1	Zenit Penza
Metiznik Magnitogorsk	3–6 (a.e.t.)	UralAZ Miass
Metallurg Magnitogorsk	0–4	Nosta Novotroitsk
Amur Blagoveshchensk	1–0	SKA Khabarovsk
Torpedo Vladimir	3–1	Avangard-Kortek Kolomna
Neftyanik Yaroslavl	1–1 (a.e.t.) (4–2 p)	Vympel Rybinsk
Spartak Kostroma	w/o	Tekstilshchik Ivanovo
Metallurg-ZapSib Novokuznetsk	0–1	Kuzbass Kemerovo
Torpedo Rubtsovsk	3–2 (a.e.t.)	Tom Tomsk
Volgar-Gazprom Astrakhan	0–2	Anzhi Makhachkala
Zvezda Gorodishche	3–1	Energiya Pyatigorsk
Istochnik Rostov-on-Don	0–1	Metallurg Krasny Sulin
Niva Slavyansk-na-Kubani	3–1 (a.e.t.)	Torpedo Taganrog
Kuban Krasnodar	2–2 (a.e.t.) (4–2 p)	Venets Gulkevichi
Volochanin Vyshny Volochyok	w/o	Trion-Volga Tver
Bulat Cherepovets	0–1	Lokomotiv Saint Petersburg
Angara Angarsk	0–2	Metallurg Krasnoyarsk
Energiya Chaykovsky	2–0	Trubnik Kamensk-Uralsky
Gornyak-Vanadiy Kachkanar	2–3	Uralets Nizhny Tagil
Gazovik-Gazprom Izhevsk	5–2 (a.e.t.)	Progress Zelenodolsk
Titan Reutov	1–0	Saturn Ramenskoye
Spartak Tambov	0–3	Metallurg Lipetsk
7 May 1995
Mosenergo Moscow	2–0	Dynamo-2 Moscow

== Third round ==
Team 1	Score	Team 2
15 May 1995
GFC Orekhovo	2–1	Avtomobilist Noginsk
FC Gatchina	1–0	Smena-Saturn Saint Petersburg
Don Novomoskovsk	1–0 (a.e.t.)	Sokol Saratov
Dynamo Yakutsk	w/o	Okean Nakhodka
Tekstilshchik Ivanovo	3–0	Shinnik Yaroslavl
Anzhi Makhachkala	w/o	Uralan Elista
Zvezda Gorodishche	1–1 (a.e.t.) (5–4 p)	Dynamo Stavropol
Metallurg Krasny Sulin	2–0	Kolos Krasnodar
16 May 1995
Avangard Kursk	1–2	Fakel Voronezh
Irtysh Omsk	3–3 (a.e.t.) (3–2 p)	Irtysh Tobolsk
Lada Dimitrovgrad	2–1 (a.e.t.)	Svetotekhnika Saransk
Kristall Sergach	3–1 (a.e.t.)	Torpedo Arzamas
Mashinostroitel Pskov	0–2	Baltika Kaliningrad
Turbostroitel Kaluga	2–3	Asmaral Moscow
Angusht Malgobek	2–0	Iriston Mozdok
Avtodor-BMK Vladikavkaz	3–0	Druzhba Maykop
Salyut Saratov	1–1 (a.e.t.) (1–3 p)	Lada-Tolyatti
Nosta Novotroitsk	1–0	UralAZ Miass
Amur Blagoveshchensk	w/o	Luch Vladivostok
Torpedo Vladimir	1–0	Neftyanik Yaroslavl
Kuzbass Kemerovo	0–0 (a.e.t.) (4–5 p)	Torpedo Rubtsovsk
Kuban Krasnodar	3–1	Niva Slavyansk-na-Kubani
Trion-Volga Tver	1–7	Zenit Saint Petersburg
Lokomotiv Saint Petersburg	0–1	Dynamo Vologda
Metallurg Krasnoyarsk	1–0	Zvezda Irkutsk
Uralets Nizhny Tagil	2–1	Energiya Chaykovsky
Gazovik-Gazprom Izhevsk	1–3	Neftekhimik Nizhnekamsk
Metallurg Lipetsk	3–2 (a.e.t.)	Torpedo Volzhsky
15 June 1995
Mosenergo Moscow	1–2 (a.e.t.)	Titan Reutov

== Fourth round ==
Team 1	Score	Team 2
4 July 1995
Fakel Voronezh	0–1	GFC Orekhovo
Irtysh Omsk	4–3 (a.e.t.)	Chkalovets Novosibirsk
Lada Dimitrovgrad	3–0	Kristall Sergach
Baltika Kaliningrad	2–0	FC Gatchina
Asmaral Moscow	2–1	Don Novomoskovsk
Nosta Novotroitsk	2–0	Lada-Tolyatti
Dynamo Yakutsk	2–3	Amur Blagoveshchensk
Torpedo Vladimir	1–3	Tekstilshchik Ivanovo
Torpedo Rubtsovsk	0–2	Zarya Leninsk-Kuznetsky
Anzhi Makhachkala	w/o	Zvezda Gorodishche
Kuban Krasnodar	3–2	Metallurg Krasny Sulin
Zenit Saint Petersburg	6–0	Dynamo Vologda
Metallurg Krasnoyarsk	0–0 (a.e.t.) (4–3 p)	Lokomotiv Chita
Neftekhimik Nizhnekamsk	2–1 (a.e.t.)	Uralets Nizhny Tagil
Metallurg Lipetsk	5–1	Titan Reutov
15 July 1995
Angusht Malgobek	1–0 (a.e.t.)	Avtodor-BMK Vladikavkaz

== Round of 32 ==
Russian Premier League teams started at this stage.

4 October 1995	GFC Orekhovo	0–3	Rotor Volgograd	Orekhovo-Zuyevo
			Burlachenko 25'; Veretennikov 73', 80'	Stadium: Znamya Truda Stadium; Attendance: 6,000; Referee: Yuri Vergopulo (Moscow)

4 October 1995	Irtysh Omsk	3–1	Krylia Sovetov Samara	Omsk
	Mulashev 2', 26', 58'		Tsiklauri 37'; Shiskin (red card) 16'	Stadium: Red Star Stadium; Attendance: 3,500; Referee: Anatoli Malyarov (Moscow)

4 October 1995	Lada Dimitrovgrad	0–1	Lokomotiv Nizhny Novgorod	Dimitrovgrad
			Kazakov 64'	Stadium: Torpedo Stadium; Attendance: 5,200; Referee: Vladimir Ovchinnikov (Moscow)

4 October 1995	Baltika Kaliningrad	1–2 (a.e.t.)	CSKA Moscow	Kaliningrad
	Bulatov 25' (pen.)		Bushmanov 65'; Gradilenko 114'	Stadium: Baltika Stadium, Attendance: 25,000; Referee: Aleksandr Lapin (Ufa)

4 October 1995	Asmaral Moscow	w/o	Spartak Moscow

4 October 1995	Angusht Malgobek	1–0	Rostselmash Rostov-on-Don	Nazran
	Markhiyev 44' (pen.)			Stadium: Askanov Stadium; Attendance: 6,000; Referee: Lom-Ali Ibragimov (Grozny)

4 October 1995	Nosta Novotroitsk	1–2 (a.e.t.)	KAMAZ-Chally Naberezhnye Chelny	Novotroitsk
	Budarin 55'		Durnev 62'; Tropanet 93'	Stadium: Yunost Stadium; Attendance: 6,000; Referee: Nikolai Levnikov (Saint Petersburg)

4 October 1995	Amur Blagoveshchensk	w/o	Dynamo-Gazovik Tyumen

4 October 1995	Tekstilshchik Ivanovo	0–1	Dynamo Moscow	Ivanovo
			Kobelev 43' (pen.)	Stadium: Tekstilshchik Stadium; Attendance: 10,100; Referee: Yuri Chebotaryov (Krasnodar)

4 October 1995	Zarya Leninsk-Kuznetsky	1–3	Chernomorets Novorossiysk	Leninsk-Kuznetsky
	Bogochev 60'		Dyshekov 14'; Burdin 65'; Sarkisov 79'	Stadium: Shakhtyor Stadium; Attendance: 4,000; Referee: Andrei Butenko (Moscow)

4 October 1995	Anzhi Makhachkala	2–1 (a.e.t.)	Spartak-Alania Vladikavkaz	Kaspiysk
	Ashurmamadov 87'; Markarov 112'		Kanishchev 66'	Stadium: City Stadium; Attendance: 5,000; Referee: Sergey Lapochkin (Saint Petersburg)

4 October 1995	Kuban Krasnodar	2–3	Zhemchuzhina Sochi	Krasnodar
	Gerasimenko 38'; St. Lysenko 41'		Bogatyryov 31'; Akulov 57'; Okhtov 60'	Stadium: Kuban Stadium; Attendance: 3,000; Referee: Aleksandr Kirillov (Moscow)

4 October 1995	Zenit Saint Petersburg	0–4	Lokomotiv Moscow	Saint Petersburg
	Kornyukhin (red card) 45'; Davydov (red card) 80'		Maminov 4', 44', 80' (pen.); Ugarov 89' (o.g.)	Stadium: Petrovsky Stadium; Attendance: 8,000; Referee: Yevgeni Volnin (Vladimir)

4 October 1995	Metallurg Krasnoyarsk	0–3	Uralmash Yekaterinburg	Krasnoyarsk
			Perednya 39'; Kokarev 45' (pen.); Matveyev 49'	Stadium: Central Stadium; Attendance: 9,200; Referee: Sergei Gusev (Tobolsk)

4 October 1995	Neftekhimik Nizhnekamsk	1–1 (a.e.t.) (4–5 p)	Tekstilshchik Kamyshin	Nizhnekamsk
	Slabodich 89'		Navochenko 26'	Stadium: Neftekhimik Stadium; Attendance: 4,400; Referee: Viktor Filippov (Moscow)
	Penalties
	Kharlamov (penalty scored); Dubrovskikh (penalty scored); Fomin (penalty missed); Akhmetgaliyev (penalty scored); Fakhrutdinov (penalty scored)		(penalty scored) Kurayev; (penalty scored) Trukhlov; (penalty scored) Navochenko; (penalty scored) Yarkov; (penalty scored) Natalushko

4 October 1995	Metallurg Lipetsk	1–0 (a.e.t.)	Torpedo Moscow	Lipetsk
	Korkin 99' (pen.)			Stadium: Metallurg Stadium; Attendance: 12,000; Referee: Taras Bezubyak (Saint Petersburg)

== Round of 16 ==
4 November 1995	Rotor Volgograd	4–0	Irtysh Omsk	Volgograd
	Yesipov 28'; Burlachenko 42'; Ilyushin 46'; Veretennikov 90'			Stadium: Central Profsoyuz Stadium; Attendance: 4,000; Referee: Viktor Filippov (Moscow)

4 November 1995	CSKA Moscow	3–0	Lokomotiv Nizhny Novgorod	Moscow
	Semak 18', 90'; Karsakov 81'			Stadium: Torpedo Stadium; Attendance: 1,500; Referee: Nikolai Levnikov (Saint Petersburg)

4 November 1995	Spartak Moscow	2–0	Angusht Malgobek	Moscow
	Shmarov 66'; Yuran 80'		Dzeytov (red card) 90'	Stadium: Luzhniki Stadium; Attendance: 1,700; Referee: Yuri Chebotaryov (Krasnodar)

4 November 1995	KAMAZ-Chally Naberezhnye Chelny	w/o	Amur Blagoveshchensk

4 November 1995	Chernomorets Novorossiysk	0–2	Dynamo Moscow	Novorossiysk
			Safronov 29'; Grishin 86'	Stadium: Trud Stadium; Attendance: 8,000; Referee: Taras Bezubyak (Saint Petersburg)

4 November 1995	Zhemchuzhina Sochi	0–3	Anzhi Makhachkala	Sochi
			Gasanbekov 3'; Markarov 45'; Ashurmamadov 73'	Stadium: Sochi Central Stadium; Attendance: 1,000; Referee: Valentin Ivanov (Moscow)

4 November 1995	Lokomotiv Moscow	4–0	Uralmash Yekaterinburg	Moscow
	Hovhannisyan 6'; Kosolapov 62' (pen.); Kuznetsov 77'; Snigiryov 80'			Stadium: Lokomotiv Stadium; Attendance: 1,000; Referee: Lom-Ali Ibragimov (Grozny)

4 November 1995	Tekstilshchik Kamyshin	1–0 (a.e.t.)	Metallurg Lipetsk	Kamyshin
	Volgin 100'			Stadium: Tekstilshchik Stadium; Attendance: 9,500; Referee: Andrei Butenko (Moscow)

== Quarter-finals ==
9 April 1996	Lokomotiv Moscow	1–0	Tekstilshchik Kamyshin	Moscow
	Kosolapov 67'			Stadium: Lokomotiv Stadium; Attendance: 3,000; Referee: Aleksandr Lapin (Ufa)

10 April 1996	KAMAZ-Chally Naberezhnye Chelny	0–1	Spartak Moscow	Naberezhnye Chelny
			Dzhubanov 64'	Stadium: KAMAZ stadium Attendance: 15,000; Referee: Nikolai Levnikov (Saint Petersburg)

11 April 1996	Dynamo Moscow	2–1	Anzhi Makhachkala	Moscow
	Kuznetsov 79'; Cheryshev 87'		Kostyuk 86'	Stadium: Torpedo Stadium; Attendance: 3,200; Referee: Gennadi Kulichenkov (Tula)

17 April 1996	Rotor Volgograd	2–0	CSKA Moscow	Volgograd
	Veretennikov 33'; Niederhaus 89'			Stadium: Central Profsoyuz Stadium; Attendance: 19,000; Referee: Taras Bezubyak (Saint Petersburg)

== Semi-finals ==
30 April 1996	Dynamo Moscow	0–1	Lokomotiv Moscow	Moscow
			Chugainov 74'	Stadium: Dynamo Stadium; Attendance: 2,500; Referee: Garyafi Zhafyarov (Moscow)

1 May 1996	Spartak Moscow	3–1	Rotor Volgograd	Moscow
	Nikiforov 3'; Evseev 43'; Piatnitski 85'		Zernov 88'	Stadium: Lokomotiv Stadium; Attendance: 9,000; Referee: Viktor Yapryntsev (Samara)

== Final ==
11 May 1996

Spartak Moscow	2–3	Lokomotiv Moscow
Lipko 22'; Nikiforov 30' (pen.)		Kosolapov 10', 43' (pen.); Drozdov 85'

Dynamo Stadium, Moscow
Attendance: 20,000
Referee: Nikolai Levnikov (Saint Petersburg)

FC Spartak Moscow	FC Lokomotiv Moscow

FC Spartak Moscow:
GK	(Russia) Aleksandr Filimonov
DF	(Russia) Dimitri Ananko
DF	(Russia) Yuriy Nikiforov
MF	(Russia) Ilya Tsymbalar
DF	(Russia) Sergei Gorlukovich
DF	(Russia) Aleksandr Lipko (substituted off) 68'
MF	(Russia) Andrei Piatnitski (captain) (substituted off) 60'
MF	(Russia) Aleksei Melyoshin
FW	(Russia) Aleksandr Shirko
DF	(Russia) Vadim Evseev (substituted off) 85'
MF	(Russia) Andrey Tikhonov
Substitutes:
MF	(Russia) Yegor Titov (substituted on) 68'
MF	(Russia) Valery Kechinov (substituted on) 60'
FW	(Russia) Vladimir Dzhubanov (substituted on) 85'
GK	(Russia) Ruslan Nigmatullin
DF	(Russia) Sergei Chudin
MF	(Russia) Dmitri Alenichev
MF	(Russia) Aleksandr Pavlenko
Manager:
(Russia) Georgi Yartsev

FC Lokomotiv Moscow:
GK	(Russia) Sergei Ovchinnikov
DF	(Tajikistan) Igor Cherevchenko
MF	(Russia) Yuri Alekseevich Drozdov
MF	(Russia) Yevgeni Kharlachyov
DF	(Armenia) Sargis Hovhannisyan
DF	(Russia) Igor Chugainov
MF	(Russia) Alexei Kosolapov (captain)
DF	(Belarus) Sergei Gurenko
FW	(Russia) Aleksei Snigiryov (substituted off) 83'
MF	(Russia) Oleg Elyshev
DF	(Russia) Andrei Solomatin
Substitutes:
FW	(Georgia (country)) Zaza Janashia (substituted on) 83'
GK	(Russia) Khasanbi Bidzhiyev
DF	(Russia) Aleksei Arifullin
MF	(Uzbekistan) Vladimir Maminov
MF	(Russia) Aleksandr Smirnov
FW	(Russia) Vitali Veselov
FW	(Ukraine) Serhiy Perepadenko
Manager:
(Russia) Yuri Syomin

MATCH RULES

- 90 minutes.
- 30 minutes of extra-time if necessary.
- Penalty shootout if scores still level.
- Seven named substitutes
- Maximum of 3 substitutions.

Played in the earlier stages, but not on the final game roster:

FC Spartak Moscow: Stanislav Cherchesov (GK), Ramiz Mamedov (DF), Viktor Onopko (DF), Vasili Kulkov (MF), Serhiy Nahornyak (Ukraine) (FW), Valeri Shmarov (FW), Sergei Yuran (FW).

FC Lokomotiv Moscow: Vyacheslav Tsaryov (DF), Yuri Baturenko (Tajikistan) (MF), Sergei Zhukov (MF), Yevgeni Kuznetsov (MF), Oleg Garin (FW).
