= 1991–92 Soviet Cup =

1991–92 Cup of USSR
Кубок СССР

Tournament details
- Country: Soviet Union (CIS)
- Dates: April 17, 1991 – May 10, 1992
- Teams: 80

Final positions
- Champions: Spartak Moscow
- Runners-up: CSKA Moscow

Tournament statistics
- Matches played: 92
- Goals scored: 271 (2.95 per match)
- Top goal scorer(s): Röwşen Muhadow (5 goals)

The 1991–92 Soviet Cup was the last edition of the knockout football cup of an already non-existing political entity, the Soviet Union.

== Political background ==
On December 25, 1991, the President of the Soviet Union Mikhail Gorbachev announced that he resigns as president. On December 26, the Soviet of the Republics, the upper chamber of the Union's Supreme Soviet, voted the Soviet Union out of existence (the lower chamber, the Council of the Union, had been unable to work since December 12, when the recall of the Russian deputies left it without a quorum).

In addition to the already ongoing hostilities instigated by the Moscow government, number of "unfriendly gestures" as well as direct internal interventions into Ukrainian politics were made towards Ukraine starting from January of 1992.

== Organizational issues ==
Despite being informed by the Football Federation of Ukraine in November of 1991 that Ukrainian clubs will not take part in the competition, the Football Federation of the Soviet Union ignored the notice and seeded Ukrainian clubs. Ukrainian clubs however were taking place in the 1992 Ukrainian Cup since February of 1992.

Because of that only one game was played during the competition's quarterfinals, while a club from Tajikistan, Pamir Dushanbe, advanced to the semifinals where it was eliminated.

The winner of the competition, Spartak Moscow, qualified for the continental tournament representing Russia in the 1992–93 European Cup Winners' Cup.

== Participating teams ==
Enter in Round of 32	Enter in First Preliminary Round				
1991 Vysshaya Liga; 16/16 teams	1991 Pervaya Liga; 20/22 teams	1991 Vtoraya Liga; 41/66 teams			Republican qual. 3 teams
✓ Dynamo Kyiv; ✓ CSKA Moscow; ✓ Dinamo Moscow; ✓ Torpedo Moscow; ✓ Spartak Moscow; ✓ Dnipro Dnipropetrovsk; ✓ Ararat Erevan; ✓ Shakhter Donetsk; ✓ Chornomorets Odesa; ✓ Pamir Dushambe; ✓ Metalist Kharkiv; ✓ Dinamo Minsk; ✓ Spartak Vladikavkaz; ✓ Pakhtakor Tashkent; ✓ Metallurg Zaporizhzhia; ✓ Lokomotiv Moscow	✓ Rotor Volgograd; ✓ Dinamo Stavropol; ✓ Shinnik Yaroslavl; ✓ Zimbrul Kishenev; ✓ Tavria Simferopol; ✓ Fakel Voronezh; ✓ Geolog Tyumen; ✓ Dinamo Sukhumi; ✓ Tiligul Tiraspol; ✓ Kotaik Abovian; ✓ Rostselmash Rostov-na-Donu; ✓ Lokomotiv Nizhniy Novgorod; ✓ Kairat Alma-Ata; ✓ Zenit Saint Petersburg; ✓ Kuban Krasnodar; ✓ Uralmash Yekaterinburg; ✓ Bukovina Chernovtsy; ✓ Neftchi Fergana; ✓ Novbakhor Namangan ✓ Pardaugava Riga: Neftchi Baku; Tekstilschik Kamyshin	✓ Karpaty Lviv; ✓ Nyva Ternopil; ✓ Nyva Vinnitsa; ✓ SKA Odesa; ✓ Zorya Luhansk; ✓ Spartak Nalchik; ✓ Dinamo Brest; ✓ Zaria Balti; ✓ Vorskla Poltava; ✓ Dnepr Mogilev; ✓ Khimik Grodno; ✓ Start Ulyanovsk; ✓ Lori Kirovokan	✓ Krylia Sovetov Samara; ✓ Kapaz Ganja; ✓ Tsement Novorossiysk; ✓ Druzhba Maykop; ✓ Torpedo Ryazan; ✓ Goyazan Gazakh; ✓ Torpedo Vladimir; ✓ Gastello Ufa; ✓ Zenit Izhevsk; ✓ Nart Cherkessk; ✓ Torpedo Volzhskiy; ✓ Sokol Saratov; ✓ KAMAZ Naberezhnye Chelny; ✓ Asmaral Moscow; ✓ Metallurg Lipetsk	✓ Amur Blagoveshchensk; ✓ Meliorator Chimkent; ✓ Khimik Dzambul; ✓ Avtomobilist Kokand; ✓ Kopet-Dag Ashkhabad; ✓ Alga Bishkek; ✓ Traktor Pavlodar; ✓ Dinamo Barnaul; ✓ Shakhter Karaganda; ✓ Vakhsh Kurgan-Tyube; ✓ Tselinnik Tselinograd; ✓ Ekibastuzets Ekibastuz; ✓ Surkhan Termez	✓ Polissya Zhytomyr (Ukraine) ✓ Naftovyk Okhtyrka (Ukraine) ✓ Dinamo Baku (Azerbaijan)

Source: []

Legend

✓ marks clubs that took part in competitions, note, not all clubs of the First League played

Notes

- Ukrainian Polissya and Naftovyk were finalists of the 1990 football cup of the Ukrainian SSR
- Dinamo Baku represented the youth center of Olympic preparation in Baku, Pardaugava Riga was based on a youth team of Latvian SSR.

== Competition schedule ==
=== First preliminary round ===
All games took place on April 17, 1991.

Team 1	Score	Team 2
April 17
Avtomobilchi Kokand (III)	1–0	(III) Amur Blagoveshchensk
Alga Bishkek (III)	2–3	(III) Kopet-dag Ashkhabad
May 2
Dynamo Brest (III)	0–0 (6–7 p)	(IV) Polissya Zhytomyr
Dnepr Mogilev (III)	1–0	(II) Zimbrul Kishenev
Naftovyk Okhtyrka (IV)	1–0	(II) Pardaugava Riga
SKA Odesa (III)	1–2	(II) Tiligul Tiraspol
Torpedo Vladimir (III)	4–0	(II) Rostselmash Rostov-na-Donu
Zorya Luhansk (III)	w/o	(III) Lori Kirovakan
Nyva Vinnytsia (III)	3–0	(II) Tavriya Simferopol
Spartak Nalchik (III)	1–0	(II) Dynamo Stavropol
Khimik Dzhambul (III)	1–0	(II) Neftchi Fergana
May 3
Asmaral Moscow (III)	3–1	(II) Kuban Krasnodar
Vorskla Poltava (III)	0–1	(III) Nyva Ternopil
Gastello Ufa (III)	4–0	(II) Fakel Voronezh
Göyazan Qazakh (III)	4–3	(III) Kapaz Ganja
Dynamo Barnaul (III)	3–0	(II) Geolog Tyumen
Druzhba Maykop (III)	3–1	(II) Dynamo Sukhumi
Zenit Izhevsk (III)	2–0	(II) Lokomotiv Nizhniy Novgorod
KamAZ Naberezhnye Chelny (III)	0–1	(II) Rotor Volgograd
Karpaty Lviv (III)	w/o	(III) Zaria Bălți
Krylia Sovetov Samara (III)	3–2	(II) Zenit Sankt Peterburg
Meliorator Chimkent (III)	3–1	(III) Vakhsh Kurgan-Tube
Metallurg Lipetsk (III)	3–1	(IV) Dynamo Baku
Sokol Saratov (III)	2–3	(III) Start Ulianovsk
Surkhan Termez (III)	0–1	(II) Novbakhor
Torpedo Volzhsky (III)	3–1	(II) Shinnik Yaroslavl
Torpedo Ryazan (III)	0–0 (3–1 p)	(II) FC Kotaik
Traktor Pavlodar (III)	2–1	(II) Kairat Alma-Aty
Khimik Grodno (III)	2–1	(II) Bukovina Chernovtsy
Tsement Novorossiysk (III)	3–0	(III) Nart Cherkessk
Shakhter Karaganda (III)	1–0	(III) Tselinnik Tselinograd
Ekibastuzets Ekibastuz (III)	5–2	(II) Uralmash Sverdlovsk

=== Second preliminary round ===
Games took place on July 1, 1991.

Team 1	Score	Team 2
June 30
Polissya Zhytomyr (IV)	4–1	(III) Khimik Grodno
July 1
Krylia Sovetov Samara (III)	2–1	(III) Torpedo Volzhsky
Naftovyk Okhtyrka (IV)	2–1	(III) Dnepr Mogilev
Rotor Volgograd (II)	4–0	(III) Start Ulianovsk
Spartak Nalchik (III)	5–0	(III) Zorya Luhansk
July 2
Dynamo Barnaul (III)	3–0	(III) FC Ekibastuzets
Khimik Dzhambul (III)	1–0	(III) Avtomobilist Kokand
July 3
Nyva Ternopil (III)	3–0	(III) Nyva Vinnytsia
Kopet-Dag Ashkhabad (III)	2–0	(III) Zenit Izhevsk
FC Novbakhor (II)	14–0	(III) Meliorator Chimkent
Traktor Pavlodar (III)	2–0	(III) Shakhter Karaganda
July 4
Asmaral Moscow (III)	1–0	(III) Torpedo Vladimir
Gastello Ufa (III)	2–0	(III) Göyazan Gazakh
Metallurg Lipetsk (III)	1–0	(III) Torpedo Ryazan
Tiligul Tiraspol (II)	2–1	(III) Karpaty Lviv
Tsement Novorossiysk (III)	2–1	(III) Druzhba Maikop

=== Bracket ===
Round of 32
Dinamo Barnaul	1	0	1
Dinamo Moscow	1	2	3
Traktor Pavlodar	3	0	3
Lokomotiv Moscow	1	3	4
Navbakhor Namangan	2	0	2
Metalist Kharkiv	0	3	3
Khimik Dzhambul	1	-	-
Dnipro Dnipropetrovsk	0	+	+
Gastello Ufa	2	1	3
Spartak Moscow	4	2	6
Kopyet-Dag Ashkhabad	5	1	6
Metalurh Zaporizhzhia	1	2	3
Krylia Sovetov Samara	2	3*	5
Torpedo Moscow	2	2	4
Rotor Volgograd	4	1	5
Spartak Vladikavkaz	3	1	4
Tiligul Tiraspol	0	0	0
Pamir Dushanbe	1	4	5
Nyva Ternopil	3	+	-
Ararat Yerevan	1	-	-
Polissya Zhytomyr	2	0	2
Dinamo Minsk	2	0	2
Naftovyk Okhtyrka	1	0	1
Dynamo Kyiv	4	4	8
Asmaral Moscow	0	2	2
CSKA Moscow	2	3	5
Metallurg Lipetsk	0	1	1
Pakhtakor Tashkent	0	7	7
Spartak Nalchik	1	-	-
Shakhtar Donetsk	1	+	+
Tsement Novorossiysk	0	0	0
Chornomorets Odesa	3	2	5

Round of 16
Dinamo Moscow	1	0	1
Lokomotiv Moscow	0	2	2
Metalist Kharkiv	3	1	4
Dnipro Dnipropetrovsk	0	2	2
Kopyet-Dag Ashkhabad	0	1	1
Spartak Moscow	0	2	2
Krylia Sovyetov Samara	0	1	1
Rotor Volgograd	0	0	0
Pamir Dushanbe	+	+	+
Nyva Ternopil	-	-	-
Dynamo Kyiv	2	-	-
Dinamo Minsk	0	+	+
Pakhtakor Tashkent	1	2	3
CSKA Moscow	1	3	4
Chornomorets Odesa (p)	2	0	2(7)
Shakhtar Donetsk	0	2	2(6)

Quarterfinals
Lokomotiv Moscow	+
Metalist Kharkiv	-
Krylia Sovetov Samara	0
Spartak Moscow	1*
Pamir Dushanbe	+
Dinamo Minsk	-
CSKA Moscow	+
Chornomorets Odesa	-

Semifinals
Lokomotiv Moscow	0
Spartak Moscow	2
CSKA Moscow	2
Pamir Dushanbe	0

Final
Spartak Moscow	2
CSKA Moscow	0

=== First round ===
Team 1	Agg.	Team 2	1st leg	2nd leg
First leg – September 3, Second leg – November 11
Dinamo Barnaul (III)	1–3	(I) Dinamo Moscow	1–1	0–2
Tiligul Tiraspol (II)	0–5	(I) Pamir Dushanbe	0–1	0–4
First leg – September 4, Second leg – September 25
Rotor Volgograd (II)	5–4	(I) Spartak Vladikavkaz	4–3	1–1
First leg – September 4, Second leg – November 15
Krylia Sovetov Samara (III)	5–4	(I) Torpedo Moscow	2–2	3–2 (a.e.t.)
Naftovyk Okhtyrka (IV)	1–8	(I) FC Dynamo Kyiv	1–4	0–4
Polissya Zhytomyr (IV)	2–2 (a)	(I) Dinamo Minsk	2–2	0–0
First leg – September 4, Second leg – November 16
Traktor Pavlodar (III)	3–4	(I) Lokomotiv Moscow	3–1	0–3
First leg – September 4, Second leg – November 17
Asmaral Moscow (III)	2–5	(I) CSKA Moscow	0–2	2–3
Gastello Ufa (III)	3–6	(I) Spartak Moscow	2–4	1–2
Kopet-dag Ashkhbad (III)	6–3	(I) Metalurh Zaporizhzhia	5–1	1–2
Metallurg Lipetsk (III)	1–7	(I) Pakhtakor Tashkent	0–0	1–7
Nyva Ternopil (III)	withdrew	(I) Ararat Yerevan	3–1	DNP
Novbahor Namangan (II)	2–3	(I) Metalist Kharkiv	2–0	0–3
Spartak Nalchik (III)	w/o	(I) Shakhter Donetsk	1–1	w/o
Khimik Dzhambul (III)	w/o	(I) Dnipro Dnipropetrovsk	1–0	w/o
Tsement Novorossiysk (III)	0–5	(I) Chornomorets Odesa	0–3	0–2

==== First games ====
3 September 1991	Dinamo Barnaul	1 – 1	Dinamo Moscow	Barnaul, Soviet Union
18:00 LST	Kashentsev 41'	Report	Simutenkov 72'	Stadium: Dinamo Stadium; Attendance: 10,000; Referee: Anatoliy Gornak (Omsk)

3 September 1991	Tiligul Tiraspol	0 – 1	Pamir Dushanbe	Tiraspol, Soviet Union
?:? LST		Report	Ashurmamadov 52'	Stadium: City Stadium; Attendance: 5,000; Referee: Mykhailo Sydor (Lviv)

4 September 1991	Asmaral Moscow	0 – 2	CSKA Moscow	Moscow, Soviet Union
?:? LST		Report	Korneev 50'; Dmitriyev 84'	Stadium: Krasnaia Presnia Stadium; Attendance: 5,000; Referee: Anatoliy Kiseliov (Moscow)

4 September 1991	Gastello Ufa	2 – 4	Spartak Moscow	Ufa, Soviet Union
18:00 LST	Slobodich 20', 58'	Report	Karpin 36'; Kozlov 43'; Golovanov 51' (o.g.); Perepadenko 70'	Stadium: Stroitel Stadium; Attendance: 8,000; Referee: Oleksandr Lytvynenko (Kyiv)

4 September 1991	Kopetdag Ashkhabat	5 – 1	Metalurh Zaporizhzhia	Aşgabat, Soviet Union
?:? LST	Annadurdyýew 2'; Nurmyradow 22'; Mingazow 30', 42'; Muhadow 36'	Report	Shkapenko 77'	Stadium: Central Stadium= Attendance: 7,000; Referee: Yuriy Chebotariov (Krasnodar)

4 September 1991	Krylia Sovetov Samara	2 – 2	Torpedo Moscow	Samara, Soviet Union
?:? LST	Fakhrutdinov 29' (pen.), 31'	Report	Chugainov 21'; Agashkov 75' (pen.)	Stadium: Metallurg Stadium; Attendance: 19,000; Referee: Lom-Ali Ibragimov (Grozny)

4 September 1991	Metallurg Lipetsk	0 – 0	Pakhtakor Tashkent	Lipetsk, Soviet Union
?:? LST	Khalzov (penalty missed) 55'	Report		Stadium: Metallurg Stadium; Attendance: 7,000; Referee: Anatoliy Aranovskyi (Kyiv)

4 September 1991	Naftovyk Okhtyrka	1 – 4	Dynamo Kyiv	Okhtyrka, Soviet Union
18:30 LST	Tymchenko 64'	Report	Sharan 23'; Salenko 33', 69' (pen.); Moroz 54'	Stadium: Naftovyk Stadium; Attendance: 9,000; Referee: V.Modin (Narva)

4 September 1991	Nyva Ternopil	3 – 1	Ararat Yerevan	Ternopil, Soviet Union
?:? LST	Biskup 20'; Yavorskyi (penalty missed) 29', 44', 47'	Report	Melikyan 13'	Stadium: City Stadium; Attendance: 20,000; Referee: ?

4 September 1991	Navbahor Namangan	2 – 0	Metalist Kharkiv	Namangan, Soviet Union
?:? LST	Latyshkin 5', 35'	Report		Stadium: 50-letie Leninskogo Komsomola Stadium; Attendance: 15,000; Referee: Viktor Yarygin (Volgograd)

4 September 1991	Polissya Zhytomyr	2 – 2	Dinamo Minsk	Zhytomyr, Soviet Union
?:? LST	Talko 51'; Baran 65'	Report	Kushnir 7'; Belkevich 50'	Stadium: imeni Leninskogo Komsomola Stadium; Attendance: 15,000; Referee: Nikolai Stulen (Kishinev)

4 September 1991	Rotor Volgograd	4 – 3	Spartak Vladikavkaz	Volgograd, Soviet Union
?:? LST	Stogov 20'; Kalitvintsev 25' (pen.); Tsarenko 33'; Sedykh 80'	Report	Suleymanov 52' (pen.); Kachmazov 82' (pen.); Bestayev 90'	Stadium: Central Stadium of Trade Unions; Attendance: 10,000; Referee: Yuriy Khlopotnov (Moscow)

4 September 1991	Spartak Nalchik	1 – 1	Shakhter Donetsk	Nalchik, Soviet Union
?:? LST	Kugotov 8'	Report	Yevseyev 32'	Stadium: Republican Stadium Spartak; Attendance: 5,000; Referee: G. Oganesian (Yerevan)

4 September 1991	Traktor Pavlodar	3 – 1	Lokomotiv Moscow	Pavlodar, Soviet Union
?:? LST	Rylov 12'; Arifullin 36' (o.g.); Trizna 65'	Report	Alenichev 37'	Stadium: Traktor Stadium; Attendance: 9,000; Referee: Sergei Roschin (Kislovodsk)

4 September 1991	Khimik Dzhambul	1 – 0	Dnipro Dnipropetrovsk	Dzhambul, Soviet Union
?:? LST	Shcherbakov 81'	Report		Stadium: Khimik Stadium; Attendance: 15,000; Referee: Yevgeniy Aleksandrov (Yaroslavl)

4 September 1991	Tsement Novorossiysk	0 – 3	Chornomorets Odesa	Novorossiysk, Soviet Union
?:? LST		Report	Hetsko 47' (pen.), 65'; Koshelyuk 90'	Stadium: Trud Stadium; Attendance: 4,500; Referee: Yuriy Vergopulo (Moscow)

==== Second games ====
25 September 1991	Spartak Vladikavkaz	1–1	Rotor Volgograd	Vladikavkaz, Soviet Union
?:?	Suleimanov (penalty missed) 50'; Kachmazov 51'	Report	Polstyanov 57'	Stadium: Republican Stadium "Spartak"; Attendance: 7,000; Referee: Ihor Yarmenchuk (Kyiv)
Note: Rotor won 5–4 on aggregate

11 November 1991	Dynamo Moscow	2–0	Dynamo Barnaul	Moscow, Soviet Union
19:00	Simutenkov 10'; But 16'	Report		Stadium: Dynamo Manezh; Attendance: 500; Referee: Igor Polukarov (Almaty)
Note: Dinamo Moscow won 3–1 on aggregate

11 November 1991	Pamir Dushanbe	4–0	Tiligul Tiraspol	Dushanbe, Soviet Union
?:?	Mandreko 25'; Mukhamadiev 27', 80'; Rakhimov 81'	Report	Vasilyev (penalty missed) 60'	Stadium: Frunze Republican Stadium; Attendance: 2,000; Referee: Yevgeniy Aleksandrov (Yaroslavl)
Note: Pamir Dushanbe won 5–0 on aggregate

15 November 1991	Torpedo Moscow	2–3 (a.e.t.)	Krylia Sovetov Samara	Moscow, Soviet Union
19:00	Agashkov (penalty missed) 45'; Chugainov 63'; Matveev 70'	Report	Filippov 36', 76', 103'	Stadium: Torpedo Stadium; Attendance: 2,300; Referee: Aleksandr Bogomazov (Biskek)
Note: Krylia Sovetov won 5–4 on aggregate

15 November 1991	Dynamo Kyiv	4–0	Naftovyk Okhtyrka	Kyiv, Soviet Union
?:?	Salenko 21' (pen.); Yu.Moroz 60', 82'; Hrytsyna 69'	Report		Stadium: Dynamo Stadium; Attendance: 300; Referee: Aleksandr Borisov (Semipalatinsk)
Note: Dynamo Kyiv won 8–1 on aggregate

15 November 1991	Dinamo Minsk	0–0	Polissya Zhytomyr	Minsk, Soviet Union
?:?		Report		Stadium: Dynamo Stadium; Attendance: 2,500; Referee: Vladimir Direktorenko (Riga)
Note: 2–2 on aggregate; Dinamo Minsk won on away goals.

16 November 1991	Lokomotiv Moscow	3–0	Traktor Pavlodar	Moscow, Soviet Union
?:?	Smirnov 40'; Podpalyi 46'; Gorkov 66'	Report		Stadium: Lokomotiv Stadium; Attendance: 200; Referee: Yuriy Chebotaryov (Krasnodar)
Note: Lokomotiv Moscow won 4–3 on aggregate.

17 November 1991	CSKA Moscow	3–2	Asmaral Moscow	Moscow, Soviet Union
?:?	Dmitriyev 51', 89'; Kolesnikov 54'	Report	Gubernskiy 23'; Rybakov 88'	Stadium: LFK CSKA; Attendance: 3,000; Referee: Gariafiy Zhafiarov (Moscow)
Note: CSKA Moscow won 5–2 on aggregate.

17 November 1991	Spartak Moscow	2–1	Gastello Ufa	Moscow, Soviet Union
?:?	Perepadenko 1'; Ivanov 77'	Report	Slabodich 44'	Stadium: Palace of Sports Recreations "Sokolniki"; Attendance: 1,000; Referee: Aleksandr Savkin (Balashikha)
Note: Spartak Moscow won 6–3 on aggregate.

17 November 1991	Metalist Kharkiv	3–0	Navbahor Namangan	Kharkiv, Soviet Union
15:00	Pryzetko 68'; Shuliatytskyi 75'; Skachenko 90'	Report		Stadium: Metalist Stadium; Attendance: 1,100; Referee: Anatoliy Kiselyov (Moscow)
Note: Metalist Kharki won 3–2 on aggregate.

17 November 1991	Chornomorets Odesa	2–0	Tsement Novorossiysk	Odesa, Soviet Union
15:00	Tsymbalar 76'	Report	Pisarev 37' (o.g.)	Stadium: BSS Central Stadium; Attendance: 1,700; Referee: Genrikh Igitian (Yerevan)
Note: Chornomorets Odesa won 5–0 on aggregate.

17 November 1991	Metalurh Zaporizhzhia	2–1	Kopet-Dag Ashkhabat	Zaporizhzhia, Soviet Union
?:?	Taran 13' (pen.); Storchak 54'	Report	Mingazov 15'	Stadium: Metalurh Central Stadium; Attendance: 5,000; Referee: Aleksei Rumyantsev (Saint Petersburg)
Note: Kopet-Dag Ashkhabat won 6–3 on aggregate.

17 November 1991	Pakhtakor Tashkent	7–1	Metallurg Lipetsk	Tashkent, Soviet Union
?:?	Kasymov 21', 69'; Shkvyrin 35', 52'; Khasanov 50'; Magometov 51'; Nazarov 78'	Report	Milenin 82'	Stadium: Pakhtakor Central Stadium; Attendance: 2,000; Referee: Mykhailo Sydor (Lviv)
Note: Pakhtakor Tashkent won 7–1 on aggregate.

17 November 1991	Ararat Yerevan	DNP	Nyva Ternopil	Yerevan, Soviet Union
?:?		Report		Stadium: undetermined
Note: Nyva Ternopil won 3–1 on aggregate.

17 November 1991	Shakhter Donetsk	DNP	Spartak Nalchik (no show)	Donetsk, Soviet Union
?:?		Report		Stadium: Shakhtar Stadium
Note: 1–1 on aggregate; Shakhter Donetsk won due to forfeit.

17 November 1991	Dnipro Dnipropetrovsk	DNP	Khimik Dzhambul	Dnipropetrovsk, Soviet Union
?:?		Report		Stadium: Meteor Stadium
Note: 0–1 on aggregate; Dnipro Dnipropetrovsk won due to forfeit.

=== Second round ===
The round started in one country, but later its postponed games were played in another.

Team 1	Agg.	Team 2	1st leg	2nd leg
First leg – November 22, Second leg – November 25
Kopet-Dag Ashkhabad (III)	1–2	(I) Spartak Moscow	0–0	1–2
FC Dynamo Kyiv (I)	withdrew	(I) Dinamo Minsk	2–0	DNP
Metalist Kharkiv (I)	4–2	(I) Dnipro Dnipropetrovsk	3–0	1–2
Chornomorets Odesa (I)	2–2 (7–6 p)	(I) Shakhter Donetsk	2–0	0–2
First leg – November 22, Second leg – November 26
Pakhtakor Tashkent (I)	3–4	(I) CSKA Moscow	1–1	2–3
First leg – February 20, Second leg – February 24
Krylia Sovetov Samara (III)	1–0	(II) Rotor Volgograd	0–0	1–0
First leg – February 24, Second leg – March 20
Dinamo Moscow (I)	1–2	(I) Lokomotiv Moscow	1–0	0–2
Pamir Dushanbe (I)	bye			

==== First games ====
22 November 1991	Kopet-Dag Ashkhabad	0–0	Spartak Moscow	Asgabat, Soviet Union
?:?		Report		Stadium: Central Stadium; Attendance: 12,000; Referee: A.Kulakov (Almaty)

22 November 1991	Dynamo Kyiv	2–0	Dinamo Minsk	Kyiv, Soviet Union
?:?	Sharan 15'; Salenko 51'	Report		Stadium: Republican Stadium; Attendance: 3,000; Referee: I.Timoshenko (Rostov-na-Donu)

22 November 1991	Metalist Kharkiv	3–0	Dnipro Dnipropetrovsk	Kharkiv, Soviet Union
?:?	Adzhoyev 43'; Khomukha 60'; Shulyatytsky 89'	Report		Stadium: Metalist Stadium; Attendance: 2,400; Referee: A.Budogosskiy (Moscow)

22 November 1991	Chornomorets Odesa	2–0	Shakhtyor Donetsk	Odesa, Soviet Union
?:?	Nikiforov 9'; Hetsko 64'	Report		Stadium: Central Stadium of ChMP; Attendance: 3,000; Referee: V.Tukhovsky (Simferopol)

22 November 1991	Pakhtakor Tashkent	1–1	CSKA Moscow	Tashkent, Soviet Union
?:?	Maqsudov 76'	Report	Bavykin 37'	Stadium: Central Stadium Pakhtakor; Attendance: 7,000; Referee: A.Khokhryakov (Yoshkar-Ola)

20 February 1992	Krylia Sovyetov Samara	0–0	Rotor Volgograd	Leselidze, Georgia
?:?		Report		Stadium: Sports base Attendance: 100; Referee: N.Levnikov (Saint Petersburg)

24 February 1992	Dinamo Moscow	1–0	Lokomotiv Moscow	Moscow, Russian Federation
18:00	Kalitvintsev 26'	Report		Stadium: LFK CSKA; Attendance: 1,200; Referee: A.Malyarov (Moscow)

==== Second games ====
25 November 1991	Spartak Moscow	2–1	Kopet-Dag Ashkhabad	Moscow, Soviet Union
?:?	Mostovoi 38' (pen.); Perepadenko 85'	Report	Muhadow 50'	Stadium: Spartak indoor complex Attendance: 1,000; Referee: L-A.Ibragimov (Grozny)

25 November 1991	Dinamo Minsk	leg voided	Dynamo Kyiv	Minsk, Soviet Union
?:?

25 November 1991	Dnipro Dnipropetrovsk	2–1	Metalist Kharkiv	Dnipropetrovsk, Soviet Union
?:?	Lebid 33'; Horily 85'	Report	Khomukha 10'	Stadium: Meteor Stadium; Attendance: 500; Referee: V.Kupryashkin (Moscow)

25 November 1991	Shakhter Donetsk	2–0 (a.e.t.) (6–7 p)	Chornomorets Odesa	Donetsk, Soviet Union
?:?	Stolovytsky 69'; Rebrov 75'	Report		Stadium: Central Stadium Shakhtar; Attendance: 1,500; Referee: A.Budogosskiy (Moscow)
	Penalties
	Leonov (penalty scored); Onopko (penalty missed); Pohodin (penalty scored); Drahunov (penalty scored); Shcherbakov (penalty scored); Martyuk (penalty scored); Kriventsov (penalty scored); Yashchenko (penalty missed)		(penalty missed) Koshelyuk; (penalty scored) Nikiforov; (penalty scored) Spitsyn; (penalty scored) Shelepnytskyi; (penalty scored) Hetsko; (penalty scored) Tretiak; (penalty scored) Sak; (penalty scored) Suslov

26 November 1991	CSKA Moscow	3–2	Pakhtakor Tashkent	Moscow, Soviet Union
?:?	Sergeyev 11'; Broshin 27'; Faizulin 86'	Report	Kasymov 28'; Maksudov 43'	Stadium: LFK CSKA; Attendance: 3,000; Referee: V.Yarygin (Volgograd)

24 February 1992	Rotor Volgograd	0–1	Krylia Sovyetov Samara	Leselidze, Georgia
?:?		Report	Makeyev 9'	Stadium: Asmaral Stadium; Attendance: 500; Referee: A.Butenko (Moscow)

20 March 1992	Lokomotiv Moscow	2–0	Dynamo Moscow	Kislovodsk, Russian Federation
17:00	Podpaly 77' (pen.); Kiselev 78'	Report	Kalitvintsev (penalty missed) '60	Stadium: Asmaral Stadium; Attendance: 7,000; Referee: A.Kirillov (Moscow)

=== Quarter-finals ===
Following the dissolution of the Soviet Union on December 25, 1991, clubs from around the fallen Soviet Union refused their further participation among which were Ukrainian clubs who effectively forfeiting their chances at the Cup, Belarusian Dinamo Minsk, Kazakhstani Khimik Dzhambul, and others, leaving only Pamir Dushanbe as the non-Russian club still in the competition.

Team 1	Score	Team 2
March 20
Krylia Sovetov Samara (Russia)	0–1 (a.e.t.)	(Russia) Spartak Moscow
CSKA Moscow (Russia)	bye	
Lokomotiv Moscow (Russia)	bye	
Pamir Dushanbe (Tajikistan)	bye	

20 March 1992	Krylia Sovyetov Samara	0–1 (a.e.t.)	Spartak Moscow	Sochi (Khosta)
?:?		Report	Karpin 100'	Stadium: Lokomotiv Stadium; Attendance: 2,500; Referee: T.Bezubyak (Saint Petersburg)

=== Semi-finals ===
Team 1	Score	Team 2
April 16
CSKA Moscow (Russia)	2–0	(Tajikistan) Pamir Dushanbe
April 17
Lokomotiv Moscow (Russia)	0–2	(Russia) Spartak Moscow

16 April 1992	CSKA Moscow	2–0	Pamir Dushanbe	Moscow
?:?	Matveyev 40'; Makarov 78'	Report		Stadium: LFK CSKA; Attendance: 2,000; Referee: Vadim Zhuk (Minsk)

17 April 1992	Lokomotiv Moscow	0–2	Spartak Moscow	Moscow
?:?		Report	Piatnitski 51'; Onopko 80'	Stadium: Lokomotiv Stadium; Attendance: 12,300; Referee: Yu.Savchenko (Moscow)

=== Final ===
10 May 1992
?:? LST

Spartak Moscow	2–0	CSKA Moscow
Bestschastnykh 20', 35'	Report	Kharine (penalty missed) '45

Lenin Central Stadium, Moscow
Attendance: 42,000
Referee: Andrei Butenko (Moscow)

Soviet Cup 1992 Winners

Spartak Moscow
10th title

== Top goalscorers ==
Scorer	Team	Goals
Röwşen Muhadow	FK Köpetdag Aşgabat	5
Vladimir Filippov	FC Krylia Sovetov Samara	4
Arnold Slabodich	FC Gastello Ufa	4
Kamil Mingazow	FK Köpetdag Aşgabat	4
Oleh Salenko	FC Dynamo Kyiv	4
Viktor Panchenko	FC Metallurg Lipetsk	3
Vladislav Yarkin	FC Dinamo Barnaul	3
Dmitri Ivanov	FC Krylia Sovetov Samara	3
Renat Idrisov	Navbahor Namangan	3
Rustam Zabirov	Navbahor Namangan	3
Sergey Andreyev	Navbahor Namangan	3
Yuriy Hudymenko	FC Rotor Volgograd	3
Yuriy Moroz	FC Dynamo Kyiv	3
Andrei Gubernsky	FC Asmaral Moscow	3
Sergey Dmitriyev	PFC CSKA Moscow	3
Ihor Yavorskyi	FC Nyva Ternopil	3
Eduard Kugotov	FC Spartak Nalchik	3
Serhiy Perepadenko	FC Spartak Moscow	3
Ivan Hetsko	FC Chornomorets Odesa	3
Mirjalol Qosimov	FC Pakhtakor Tashkent	3

== Number of teams by union republic ==
Rank	Union republic	Number of teams
1	RSFSR	6 (Top League); 10 (First League); 2/13/2 (Second League); 33 (Total)
2	Ukrainian SSR	6 (Top League); 2 (First League); 6 (Second League); 2 (Cup); 16 (Total)
3	Kazakh SSR	1 (First League); 6 (Second League); 7 (Total)
4	Uzbek SSR	1 (Top League); 2 (First League); 2 (Second League); 5 (Total)
5	Belarusian SSR	1 (Top League); 3 (Second League); 4 (Total)
6	Armenian SSR	1 (Top League); 1 (First League); 1 (Second League); 3 (Total)
7	Moldavian SSR	2 (First League); 1 (Second League); 3 (Total)
8	Azerbaijan SSR	2 (Second League); 1 (Extra); 3 (Total)
9	Tajik SSR	1 (Top League); 1 (Second League); 2 (Total)
10	Georgian SSR	1 (First League); 1 (Total)
10	Latvian SSR	1 (First League); 1 (Total)
12	Turkmen SSR	1 (Second League); 1 (Total)
12	Kyrgyz SSR	1 (Second League); 1 (Total)

Notes

- Officially all Georgian teams withdrew from all Soviet competitions. However, due to occupation of Abkhazia by the Russian troops, in the 1991–92 Soviet Cup was participating Dynamo Sukhumi "as if" Georgian team ignoring the official policy of the Georgian Football Federation.
- Official boycott of the competition existed from Lithuania and Georgia as well as FC Neftchi Baku. In place of Daugava Riga, the Latvian Football Federation was fielding its youth national team under the name of FK Pārdaugava.

== See also ==
- 1991 Soviet Top League
- 1992 Soviet Top League
- 1992 Russian Top League
- 1991 Soviet First League
- 1993 Commonwealth of Independent States Cup
