= Sergei Akimov =

Sergei or Sergei Akimov may refer to:

- Sergei Akimov (Estonian footballer), Estonian footballer with FC Flora Rakvere
- Sergei Akimov (footballer) (born 1987), Russian footballer
- Sergei Akimov (ice hockey) (born 1976), Russian hockey player
