= Perepadenko =

Perepadenko is a Ukrainian surname. Notable people with the surname include:

- Hennadiy Perepadenko (born 1964), Ukrainian footballer, brother of Serhiy
- Serhiy Perepadenko (born 1972), Ukrainian footballer
