= Sergei Vinnitskiy =

Russian footballer

Personal information
- Date of birth: 20 October 1975 (age 51)
- Position: Defender

Senior career*
Years	Team	Apps	(Gls)
1992	FC Venets Gulkevichi	2	(0)
1992	FC Kuban Krasnodar	4	(0)
1992	FC Niva Slavyansk-na-Kubani	4	(0)
- * Club domestic league appearances and goals

Sergei Vinnitskiy (Russian: Сергей Винницкий; born 20 October 1975) is a former Russian football player.
