= Vladimir Dobrikov =

Soviet footballer and coach

- Vladimir Dobrikov in 1966

Personal information
- Date of birth: 30 August 1925
- Date of death: March 1995 (aged 69)
- Place of death: Moscow, Russia
- Position: Forward

Senior career*
Years	Team	Apps	(Gls)
1947–1949	DO Kyiv		
1949–1953	MVO Moscow		
1953–1954	Zenit Leningrad	21	(2)
- * Club domestic league appearances and goals

Vladimir Grigorievich Dobrikov (Russian: Владимир Григорьевич Добриков; August 30, 1925 – March 1995) was a Soviet football player and coach. Master Sports of the USSR. Honored coach of the RSFSR.

== Biography ==
In 1947 he played for ODO Kiev. Then a few years spent in the team FC MVO Moscow, he became a finalist in its composition the USSR Cup 1951 held in the hand all the matches of his team and scored one goal in the gates league teams FC Dynamo Moscow and Shakhtar Stalino. In the same season his team won the class B (at that time the second strongest division of the Soviet football). Perhaps Dobrikov also participated in a victory for the club championship of the RSFSR in 1950. In the season 1952 played for the MVO Class A only 3 matches. Then he spent two seasons in Zenit (31 and 2 goals a game in Class A, 5 games and 3 goals in the USSR Cup).

He graduated from the High School coaches. In 1963 and 1970 he worked as a senior manager in FC Zirka Kropyvnytskyi. Coached FC Lokomotiv Kaluga, which he became the champion of the RSFSR in 1966 year.

In the season of 1971 he worked in the second division with FC Spartak Kostroma. He also worked in the Leningrad football school youth, young men trained in Moscow. He died in March 1995.
