= Dmitri Golubev (footballer, born 1971) =

Russian footballer and manager

Personal information
- Full name: Dmitri Vasilyevich Golubev
- Date of birth: 24 September 1971 (age 55)
- Place of birth: Vyksa, Russian SFSR
- Height: 1.84 m (6 ft 1/2 in)
- Position: Forward

Youth career
- Avangard Vyksa

Senior career*
Years	Team	Apps	(Gls)
1990	FC Metallurg Vyksa		
1991	FC Volzhanin Kineshma	38	(6)
1992	FC Torpedo Arzamas	22	(7)
1993–1994	FC Lokomotiv Nizhny Novgorod	22	(1)
1994–1995	FC Torpedo Arzamas	30	(5)
1995	FC Metallurg Vyksa	9	(4)
1996	FC Torpedo Arzamas	9	(1)
1997–2001	FC Metallurg Vyksa	162	(74)
2003–2005	FC Metallurg Vyksa	61	(8)

Managerial career
- 2002–2003: FC Metallurg Vyksa (assistant)
- 2006–2015: FC Metallurg Vyksa
- 2017–2019: FC Murom (director)
- 2018–2019: FC Murom (assistant)
- * Club domestic league appearances and goals

Dmitri Vasilyevich Golubev (Russian: Дмитрий Васильевич Голубев; born 24 September 1971) is a Russian football manager and a former player.

== Club career ==
Golubev played in the Russian Premier League with FC Lokomotiv Nizhny Novgorod and in the Russian First Division with FC Torpedo Arzamas.
