= Bestayev =

Bestayev or Bestaev (Ossetian: Бестаутæ) is an Ossetian masculine surname, its feminine counterpart is Bestayeva or Bestaeva.

It may refer to

- Alimbeg Bestayev (1936–1988), Russian and Ossetian wrestler
- Anri Bestayev (born 1964), Russian football player (North Ossetia)
- Otar Bestaev (born 1991), Kyrgyzstani judoka
- Valerian Bestayev (born 1982), Russian football player
