= Vladislav Velikodny =

Russian footballer

Personal information
- Full name: Vladislav Anatolyevich Velikodny
- Date of birth: 6 April 1971 (age 55)
- Height: 1.72 m (5 ft 7 1/2 in)
- Positions: Midfielder; forward

Senior career*
Years	Team	Apps	(Gls)
1989–1990	FC Spartak Anapa	60	(2)
1991	FC Lokomotiv Moscow	0	(0)
1991–1992	FC Niva Slavyansk-na-Kubani	1	(0)
1992–1998	FC Kuban Krasnodar	213	(30)
1996–1997	→ FC Kuban-d Krasnodar (loans)	4	(0)
1999	FC Krasnodar (amateur)		
2001	FC Vympel Krasnodar		
- * Club domestic league appearances and goals

Vladislav Anatolyevich Velikodny (Russian: Владислав Анатольевич Великодный; born 6 April 1971; some sources incorrectly list his first name as Vadim or Vladimir) is a former Russian football player.
