= Soviet Class A Second Group =

Association football league in the Soviet Union

- Founded: 1963
- Folded: 1970
- Country: Soviet Union
- Level on pyramid: Level 2 & 3
- Promotion to: Soviet Class A First Group
- Relegation to: Soviet Class B
- Last champions: Metalurh Zaporizhia; Avtomobilist Nalchik

The Soviet Class A Second Group (Russian: Чемпионат СССР по футболу (Класс А. Вторая группа), Soviet football championship (Class A Second Group)) was the second and for a season third highest division of Soviet football, below the Soviet Class A First Group. The league was formed in 1963 by splitting away from the Class A and forcing the Class B of the Soviet football championship to downgrade to the third tier.

In 1970 the Soviet Class A was expanded even further adding additional tier to the top and downgrading the Soviet Class A Second Group to the third tier. In 1971 it was replaced with the Soviet Second League.

== Winners ==
=== Second tier ===
| Season | Winner | | Runners-up | Third | Notes |
|---|---|---|---|---|---|
| 1963 | Shinnik Yaroslavl | | Torpedo Gorkiy | Trud Voronezh | |
| 1964 | Subgroup 1 | FC Avanhard Kharkiv | FC Chornomorets Odessa | Žalgiris Vilnius | |
| 1964 | Subgroup 2 | SCA Odessa | FC Shakhter Karaganda | Lokomotiv Moscow | |
| 1964 | Final | Lokomotiv Moscow | SCA Odessa | Pakhtakor Tashkent | |
| 1965 | Subgroup 1 | FC Tekstilshchik Ivanovo | FC Uralmash Sverdlovsk | FC Avanhard Kharkiv | |
| 1965 | Subgroup 2 | FC Shinnik Yaroslavl | FC Zorya Luhansk | Žalgiris Vilnius | |
| 1965 | Final | Ararat Yerevan | Kairat Alma-Aty | Avanhard Kharkiv | |
| 1966 | Subgroup 1 | Žalgiris Vilnius | FC Tekstilshchik Ivanovo | FC Kuban Krasnodar | |
| 1966 | Subgroup 2 | FC Zorya Luhansk | SKA Kyiv | SKA Lviv | |
| 1966 | Subgroup 3 | FC Politodel | FC Shakhter Karaganda | FC Stroitel Ufa | |
| 1966 | Final | Zorya Luhansk | Žalgiris Vilnius | Politotdel Tashkent | |
| 1967 | Subgroup 1 | FC Dinamo Kirovabad | FK Daugava Riga | FC Kuban Krasnodar | |
| 1967 | Subgroup 2 | SKA Kyiv | FC Metalurh Zaporizhia | SKA Lviv | |
| 1967 | Subgroup 3 | FC Shakhter Karaganda | FC Uralmash Sverdlovsk | FC Alga Frunze | |
| 1967 | Final | Dynamo Kirovabad | Shakhtar Karaganda | SKA Kyiv | |
| 1968 | Subgroup 1 | FC Karpaty Lviv | SKA Kyiv | SKA Odessa | |
| 1968 | Subgroup 2 | Sudnobudivnyk Mykolaiv | FC Metalist Kharkiv | FC Dnipro Dnipropetrovsk | |
| 1968 | Subgroup 3 | FC Uralmash Sverdlovsk | FC Spartak Ordzhonikidze | FC Dynamo Makhachkala | |
| 1968 | Subgroup 4 | FC Irtysh Omsk | FC Kuzbass Kemerovo | SKA Khabarovsk | |
| 1968 | Final | Uralmash Sverdlovsk | Karpaty Lviv | Irtysh Omsk | |
| 1969 | Subgroup 1 | FC Spartak Ordzhonikidze | FC Dynamo Leningrad | FC Kuban Krasnodar | |
| 1969 | Subgroup 2 | SKA Khabarovsk | FC Rubin Kazan | FC Metallurg Kuibyshev | |
| 1969 | Subgroup 3 | FC Dnipro Dnipropetrovsk | SKA Kyiv | FC Metalist Kharkiv | |
| 1969 | Subgroup 4 | Žalgiris Vilnius | FC Shakhter Karaganda | FC Lokomotivi Tbilisi | |
| 1969 | Final | Spartak Ordzhonikidze | Dnipro Dnipropetrovsk | SKA Khabarovsk | |

=== Third tier ===
| Season | Zone | Winner | Runners-up | Third | Notes |
|---|---|---|---|---|---|
| 1970 | Ukraine | Metalurh Zaporizhia | Tavriya Simferopol | Avtomobilist Zhytomyr | three zones; top two teams of second and third groups played in final Russian group |
| 1970 | Russia | Avtomobilist Nalchik | Spartak Yoshkar‑Ola | Kuzbass Kemerevo | three zones; top two teams of second and third groups played in final Russian group |
