= Egor Mednikov =

Soviet footballer (born 1949)

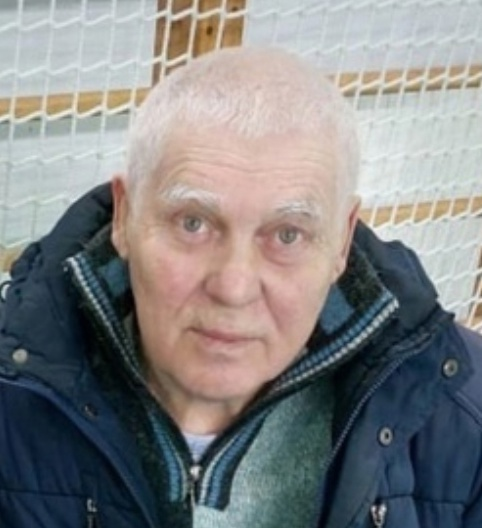

Personal information
- Full name: Egor Egorovich Mednikov
- Date of birth: 3 June 1949 (age 77)
- Place of birth: Lyudinovo, Kaluga Oblast, Russian SFSR, Soviet Union
- Position: Goalkeeper

Youth career
- SC Avangard Lyudinovo

Senior career*
Years	Team	Apps	(Gls)
1967–1973	FC Lokomotiv Kaluga	95↑	(-42↑)
1974	FC Spartak Moscow	6	(-2)
1975–1977	FC Zimbru Chișinău	48	(-49↑)
1978–1979	SC Tavriya Simferopol	78	(-90)
1980–1982	FC Zhenis	95	(-84)
1982	FC Kairat	0	(0)
1983–1987	FC Zhenis	126	(2)
1991	FC Kaisar	2	(0)
2003	Zarya Centralny	3	(-3)

Managerial career
- 1989–1990: FC Zhenis (assistant)
- 1994: FC Zhenis (director)
- 2001: FC Lokomotiv Kaluga (goalkeeping coach)
- 2001–: Sports school Torpedo Kaluga (coach)
- * Club domestic league appearances and goals

Egor Egorovich Mednikov (Russian: Егор Егорович Медников; born 3 June 1949) is a Soviet football player, goalkeeper, coach.
