= Yumatov =

Юматов
- Romanization: Yumatov
- Gender: Masculine

Origin
- Language: Russian

Юматовa
- Romanization: Yumatova
- Gender: Feminine

Origin
- Language: Russian

Yumatov (Russian: Юматов) is a Russian masculine surname; its feminine counterpart is Yumatova.

Notable people with the surname include:

- Georgi Yumatov (1926–1997), Soviet film actor
- Pavel Yumatov (born 1974), Russian football player
