= Igor Kuznechenkov =

Russian footballer

Personal information
- Full name: Igor Nikolayevich Kuznechenkov
- Date of birth: 3 January 1966 (age 60)
- Place of birth: Velikiye Luki, Russian SFSR
- Position: Forward

Senior career*
| Years | Team | Apps | (Gls) |
| 1983–1984 | FC Zenit Leningrad | 0 | (0) |
| 1984 | FC Dynamo Leningrad | 2 | (0) |
| 1985 | FC Torpedo Vladimir | 9 | (0) |
| 1986 | FC Dynamo Leningrad | 16 | (1) |
| 1989 | FC Avtopribor Oktyabrsky (amateur) | | |
| 1990 | FC Avtopribor Oktyabrsky | 19 | (1) |
| 1991 | FC Spartak Anapa | 17 | (1) |
| 1991 | FC Golubaya Niva Slavyansk-na-Kubani | 12 | (4) |
| 1992 | FC APK Azov | 34 | (8) |
| 1993–1994 | FK Hlubočky | | |
| 1995–1996 | UNEX Uničov | | |
| 1996 | Mikkelin Palloilijat | 18 | (1) |
| 1998 | FC Khimik-ICN Saint Petersburg | | |
| 2002 | Sääksjärven Loiske | | |
| 2004 | FC Alyye Parusa Saint Petersburg | | |
| 2009–2010 | FC Tsarskoye Selo Pushkin | | |
- * Club domestic league appearances and goals

Igor Nikolayevich Kuznechenkov (Russian: Игорь Николаевич Кузнеченков; born 3 January 1966) is a former Russian professional footballer.

== Club career ==
He made his Russian Football National League debut for FC APK Azov on 25 April 1992 in a game against FC Spartak Anapa. That was his only season in the FNL.
