= Sizov =

Sizov (Russian: Сизов) is a Russian masculine surname, its feminine counterpart is Sizova. It may refer to

- Alla Sizova (1939–2014), Russian ballet dancer
- Gennady Sizov (1941–2021), Soviet and Russian diplomat
- Oleg Sizov (born 1963), Russian football player and coach
- Oleksandr Sizov (born 1988), Ukrainian basketball player
