= Anatoly Sedykh =

Anatoly Sedykh may refer to:

- Anatoli Sedykh (born 1970), Russian footballer
- Anatoly Sedykh (serial killer) (born 1963), Russian serial killer
