= Sedykh =

Sedykh or Sedyh is a gender-neutral Slavic surname. It may refer to

- Anatoli Sedykh (born 1970), Russian association football player
- Natalya Sedykh (born 1948), Russian figure skater, ballet dancer, and film actor
- Yuriy Sedykh (born 1955), Soviet hammer thrower, father of Alexia
