= Bukharov =

Bukharov (Russian: Буха́ров) is a Russian surname. Notable people with the surname include:

- Aleksandr Bukharov (born 1985), Russian footballer
- Aleksandr Bukharov (footballer, born 1987), Russian footballer
- Aleksandr Bukharov (actor), Russian actor
