= Viktor Voronkov =

Russian footballer

Personal information
- Full name: Viktor Viktorovich Voronkov
- Date of birth: 4 August 1974 (age 52)
- Place of birth: Moscow, Russia
- Height: 1.78 m (5 ft 10 in)
- Positions: Midfielder; forward

Senior career*
Years	Team	Apps	(Gls)
1992	FC CSKA-2 Moscow	3	(0)
1994	FC Kristall Sergach	11	(1)
1995–1997	FC Roda Moscow	78	(32)
1998–1999	FK Ventspils	48	(21)
2000	FC Dynamo Moscow	15	(2)
2001	FC Kuban Krasnodar	13	(2)
2001–2002	FC Khimki	45	(9)
2003–2004	FC Metallurg Lipetsk	80	(12)
2005	FC Amur Blagoveshchensk	36	(5)
2006	FC Metallurg-Kuzbass Novokuznetsk	7	(1)
2006–2007	FC Spartak-MZhK Ryazan	35	(7)
2007	FC Volga Nizhny Novgorod	13	(3)
2008	FC MVD Rossii Moscow	9	(0)
2008	FC Nizhny Novgorod	15	(8)
- * Club domestic league appearances and goals

Viktor Viktorovich Voronkov (Russian: Виктор Викторович Воронков; born 4 August 1974) is a former Russian professional footballer.

== Club career ==
He made his debut in the Russian Premier League in 2000 for FC Dynamo Moscow.

== Honours ==
- Latvian Higher League bronze: 1998, 1999.
