= Sergei Akimov (footballer) =

Russian footballer (born 1987)

Personal information
- Full name: Sergei Nikolayevich Akimov
- Date of birth: 12 June 1987 (age 39)
- Place of birth: Kaluga, Russian SFSR
- Height: 1.72 m (5 ft 7 1/2 in)
- Position: Midfielder

Senior career*
Years	Team	Apps	(Gls)
2003–2006	FC Lokomotiv Kaluga	89	(4)
2007	FC Rotor Volgograd	9	(0)
2007	FC Tekstilshchik Kamyshin	11	(0)
2008	FC Rotor Volgograd	13	(1)
2008–2010	FC Zhemchuzhina-Sochi	50	(1)
2011–2012	FC Kaluga	21	(0)
2013	FC Dynamo Kirov	4	(1)
- * Club domestic league appearances and goals

Sergei Nikolayevich Akimov (Russian: Серге́й Николаевич Акимов; born 12 June 1987) is a former Russian professional football player.

== Club career ==
He played in the Russian Football National League for FC Zhemchuzhina-Sochi in 2010.
