= Nikolai Sidorov (footballer) =

Russian footballer and coach

Personal information
- Full name: Nikolai Sergeyevich Sidorov
- Date of birth: 5 November 1974 (age 51)
- Place of birth: Kaluga, Russian SFSR
- Height: 1.89 m (6 ft 2 1/2 in)
- Position: Midfielder

Youth career
- Zarya Kaluga

Senior career*
Years	Team	Apps	(Gls)
1993–1994	Zarya Kaluga		
1995–1996	FC Turbostroitel Kaluga	42	(5)
1997	FC Lokomotiv Kaluga	33	(18)
1998	FC Shinnik Yaroslavl	12	(1)
1999	FC Spartak-Orekhovo Orekhovo-Zuyevo	34	(6)
2000–2001	FC Gazovik-Gazprom Izhevsk	44	(3)
2001–2002	FC Metallurg Lipetsk	30	(6)
2002	FC Spartak Tambov	9	(0)
2003	FC Lokomotiv Kaluga	12	(0)
2004	FC Spartak Tambov	25	(2)
2005–2006	FC Lokomotiv Kaluga	59	(14)
2008–2009	FC Zvezda Serpukhov	55	(2)
2010	FC Kaluga	23	(1)

Managerial career
- 2011–2018: FC Kaluga (assistant)
- * Club domestic league appearances and goals

Nikolai Sergeyevich Sidorov (Russian: Николай Серге́евич Сидоров; born 5 November 1974) is a Russian professional football coach and a former player.

== Playing career ==
He made his debut in the Russian Premier League in 1998 for FC Shinnik Yaroslavl. He played 2 games in the UEFA Intertoto Cup 1998 for FC Shinnik Yaroslavl.

== Honours ==
- Russian Third League Zone 4 top scorer: 1997 (18 goals).
