= Arnold Slabodich =

Russian footballer and coach

Personal information
- Full name: Arnold Rinatovich Slabodich
- Date of birth: 31 August 1973 (age 53)
- Place of birth: Ufa, Russian SFSR
- Height: 1.80 m (5 ft 11 in)
- Positions: Forward; midfielder

Senior career*
| Years | Team | Apps | (Gls) |
| 1990–1993 | FC Gastello Ufa | 77 | (9) |
| 1994 | FC KAMAZ Naberezhnye Chelny | 1 | (0) |
| 1994 | FC Torpedo Vladimir | 22 | (5) |
| 1995 | FC KAMAZ-Chally Naberezhnye Chelny | 16 | (1) |
| 1995–2001 | FC Neftekhimik Nizhnekamsk | 177 | (40) |
| 2002 | FC Uralmash Yekaterinburg | 25 | (2) |
| 2004 | FC Saturn Naberezhnye Chelny (amateur) | | |
| 2005 | FC Saturn Naberezhnye Chelny | 12 | (5) |

Managerial career
- 2010–2011: FC KAMAZ Naberezhnye Chelny (assistant)
- 2014–2017: FC Orenburg (assistant)
- 2017: FC Tobol (assistant)
- 2018–2019: FC Rotor Volgograd (assistant)
- 2019: FC KAMAZ Naberezhnye Chelny (assistant)
- 2019–2023: FC Pari Nizhny Novgorod (assistant)
- 2023: FC KAMAZ Naberezhnye Chelny (assistant)
- * Club domestic league appearances and goals

Arnold Rinatovich Slabodich (Russian: Арнольд Ринатович Слабодич; born 31 August 1973) is a Russian professional football coach and a former player.

== Club career ==
He made his Russian Premier League debut for FC KAMAZ Naberezhnye Chelny on 16 April 1994 in a game against FC Lokomotiv Nizhny Novgorod. He also played in the top tier in 1995.
