= Aleksandr Bukharov (footballer, born 1987) =

Russian footballer

Personal information
- Full name: Aleksandr Viktorovich Bukharov
- Date of birth: 11 January 1987 (age 39)
- Place of birth: Brezhnev, Russian SFSR
- Height: 1.82 m (5 ft 11 1/2 in)
- Positions: Forward; midfielder

Youth career
- Zarya Naberezhnye Chelny
- FC KAMAZ Naberezhnye Chelny

Senior career*
Years	Team	Apps	(Gls)
2006	FC KAMAZ Naberezhnye Chelny	7	(0)
2007	FC Neftekhimik Nizhnekamsk	25	(5)
2008	FC Alnas Almetyevsk	28	(7)
2009	FC Neftekhimik Nizhnekamsk	30	(2)
2010	FC Khimik Dzerzhinsk	21	(6)
2011	FC Zvezda Ryazan	25	(4)
2012	FC Metallurg Vyksa	14	(0)
2013–2015	FC KAMAZ Naberezhnye Chelny	55	(6)
2015–2016	FC Khimik Dzerzhinsk	15	(6)
- * Club domestic league appearances and goals

Aleksandr Viktorovich Bukharov (Russian: Александр Викторович Бухаров; born 11 January 1987) is a former Russian professional football player.

== Club career ==
He played in the Russian Football National League for FC KAMAZ Naberezhnye Chelny in 2006.
