= Viktor Ledovskikh =

Russian footballer

Personal information
- Full name: Viktor Nikolayevich Ledovskikh
- Date of birth: 8 October 1967 (age 59)
- Height: 1.75 m (5 ft 9 in)
- Positions: Midfielder; forward

Youth career
- 1985: Shakhtar Donetsk

Senior career*
Years	Team	Apps	(Gls)
1991	Mashuk Pyatigorsk	4	(0)
1993	APK Azov	21	(2)
1994	Istochnik Rostov-on-Don	17	(3)
1996	Spartak-Bratskiy Yuzhny	12	(4)
1996–1997	Elektron Romny	7	(2)
1997	Spartak-Bratskiy Yuzhny	28	(16)
1998	Molodechno	3	(0)
1998	Salyut Saratov	18	(5)
2000	Kommunalnik Slonim	5	(0)
2002	FC Fakel Taganrog		
- * Club domestic league appearances and goals

Viktor Nikolayevich Ledovskikh (Russian: Виктор Николаевич Ледовских; born 8 October 1967) is a former Russian professional football player.

== Club career ==
He made his Russian Football National League debut for FC APK Azov on 3 April 1993 in a game against FC Spartak Anapa. That was his only season in the FNL.
