= Oleg Akulov =

Russian footballer and coach

Personal information
- Full name: Oleg Aleksandrovich Akulov
- Date of birth: 6 January 1973 (age 53)
- Height: 1.77 m (5 ft 9 1/2 in)
- Position: Forward

Senior career*
Years	Team	Apps	(Gls)
1993	FC Zhemchuzhina Sochi	0	(0)
1993	→ FC Torpedo Adler (loan)	4	(0)
1995–1996	FC Zhemchuzhina Sochi	10	(0)
1995–1996	→ FC Zhemchuzhina-2 Sochi (loans)	36	(16)
1997	FC Kuban Krasnodar	18	(1)
1997	→ FC Kuban-d Krasnodar (loan)	1	(0)
1998–1999	FC Kuzbass Kemerovo	26	(1)
2000	FC Kristall Smolensk	8	(0)
2001	FC Lada-Energiya Dimitrovgrad	33	(20)
2002	FC Terek Grozny	13	(3)
2003–2004	FC Volga Ulyanovsk	46	(7)
2008	FC Agrokompleks Vyselki		

Managerial career
- 2006–2008: FC Sochi-04 (assistant)
- * Club domestic league appearances and goals

Oleg Aleksandrovich Akulov (Russian: Олег Александрович Акулов; born 6 January 1973) is a Russian football coach and a former player.
