= Yevgeni Yarkov =

Russian footballer

Personal information
- Full name: Yevgeni Anatolyevich Yarkov
- Date of birth: 27 May 1973 (age 53)
- Place of birth: Perm, Russian SFSR
- Height: 1.82 m (5 ft 11 1/2 in)
- Position: Midfielder

Youth career
- FC Zvezda Perm
- UOR Volgograd

Senior career*
| Years | Team | Apps | (Gls) |
| 1990 | FC Rotor Volgograd | 0 | (0) |
| 1990 | FC Tekstilshchik Kamyshin | 6 | (0) |
| 1991 | FC Rus Volgograd | 16 | (1) |
| 1991–1994 | FC Avangard Kamyshin | 94 | (7) |
| 1995 | FC Tekstilshchik Kamyshin | 25 | (0) |
| 1996 | FC Torpedo Volzhsky | 15 | (1) |
| 1996 | FC Kavkazkabel Prokhladny | 16 | (4) |
| 1997–2002 | FC Amkar Perm | 190 | (16) |
| 2003 | FC Sibiryak Bratsk | 22 | (10) |
| 2004 | FC LUKoil Chelyabinsk | 27 | (1) |
| 2005 | FC Gazovik-Gazprom Izhevsk | 23 | (0) |
| 2006 | FC Oktan Perm (amateur) | | |
| 2006 | FC Prikamye Perm | | |
| 2006 | FC Dzerzhinets Perm | | |
| 2008 | FC Metafraks Gubakha | | |
| 2008 | FC Krasava Permsky Raion | | |
- * Club domestic league appearances and goals

Yevgeni Anatolyevich Yarkov (Russian: Евгений Анатольевич Ярков; born 27 May 1973) is a former Russian football player.
