= Sabir Khamzin =

Russian footballer

Personal information
- Full name: Sabir Shirbalayevich Khamzin
- Date of birth: 20 December 1972 (age 53)
- Place of birth: Shchyolkovo, Russian SFSR
- Height: 1.75 m (5 ft 9 in)
- Positions: Forward; midfielder

Senior career*
| Years | Team | Apps | (Gls) |
| 1992 | FC Kinotavr Podolsk | 18 | (5) |
| 1993–1994 | FC TRASKO Moscow | 52 | (25) |
| 1995 | FC Dynamo-Gazovik Tyumen | 8 | (0) |
| 1996–1997 | Minkas Moscow (futsal) | | |
| 1997 | FC Sportakademklub Moscow | 28 | (17) |
| 1998 | FK Ventspils | 26 | (9) |
| 1999 | FC Khimki | 32 | (11) |
| 2000 | FC Vityaz Podolsk | | |
| 2001 | FC Presnya Moscow | | |
| 2001 | Abahani | | |
| 2001–2002 | Stade Brestois 29 | 18 | (3) |
| 2002 | FC Almaz Moscow (D4) | ? | (61) |
| 2003 | FC Obninsk | | |
| 2004 | FC Orbita Dzerzhinsky | | |
- * Club domestic league appearances and goals

Sabir Shirbalayevich Khamzin (Russian: Сабир Ширбалаевич Хамзин; born 20 December 1972) is a retired Russian professional footballer.

== Honours ==
- Latvian Higher League bronze: 1998.
