= Igor Kachmazov (footballer, born 1968) =

Russian footballer (1968–2019)

Personal information
- Full name: Igor Borisovich Kachmazov
- Date of birth: 30 August 1968
- Place of birth: Ordzhonikidze, Russian SFSR, Soviet Union
- Date of death: 10 August 2019 (aged 50)
- Height: 1.75 m (5 ft 9 in)
- Position: Midfielder

Senior career*
Years	Team	Apps	(Gls)
1986	FC Spartak Ordzhonikidze	16	(0)
1989–1994	FC Spartak Vladikavkaz	115	(7)
1995–1997	FC Lokomotiv St. Petersburg	41	(6)
1998	FC Tyumen	5	(0)
1998	FC Avtodor Vladikavkaz	7	(0)
2002	FC Kolomna	12	(0)
Total		196	(13)
- * Club domestic league appearances and goals

Igor Borisovich Kachmazov (Russian: Игорь Борисович Качмазов; 30 August 1968 – 10 August 2019) was a Russian professional footballer. He made his professional debut in the Soviet First League in 1986 for FC Spartak Ordzhonikidze. He played 1 game in the UEFA Cup 1993–94 for FC Spartak Vladikavkaz.

== Honours ==
- Russian Premier League runner-up: 1992.
