= Sergey Akimov (ice hockey) =

Russian professional ice hockey player

- Born: October 15, 1976 (age 48); Moscow, Russia
- Height: 5 ft 11 in (180 cm)
- Weight: 187 lb (85 kg; 13 st 5 lb)
- Position: Forward
- Shot: Left
- Played for: KHL; HC Spartak Moscow; Amur Khabarovsk
- NHL draft: Undrafted
- Playing career: 1995–2012

Sergey Akimov (born October 15, 1976) is a Russian professional ice hockey player. Akimov made his Kontinental Hockey League debut playing with HC Spartak Moscow during the 2008–09 season.
