= Yevgeni Kornyukhin =

Russian footballer

Personal information
- Full name: Yevgeni Vasilyevich Kornyukhin
- Date of birth: 7 March 1967 (age 59)
- Place of birth: Moscow, Russian SFSR
- Height: 1.92 m (6 ft 3 1/2 in)
- Position: Goalkeeper

Team information
- Current team: FC Khimki (GK coach)

Senior career*
Years	Team	Apps	(Gls)
1984	PFC CSKA Moscow	0	(0)
1988	FC Pakhtakor Andijan	27	(0)
1989	FC Pakhtakor Tashkent	1	(0)
1990	FC Spartak Andijan	15	(0)
1990	FC Sokol Saratov	2	(0)
1991	FC Prometey Lyubertsy	0	(0)
1991	FC Torpedo Mytishchi	2	(0)
1992–1994	FC Vympel Rybinsk	75	(0)
1994	FC Rostselmash Rostov-on-Don	20	(0)
1995	FC Zenit St. Petersburg	25	(0)
1996	FC Energiya-Tekstilshchik Kamyshin	32	(0)
1997–1998	FC Shinnik Yaroslavl	59	(0)
1999–2000	FC Torpedo Moscow	44	(0)
2001–2002	FC Shinnik Yaroslavl	51	(0)
2003–2004	FC Saturn Ramenskoye	26	(0)
2004	FC Khimki	11	(0)
2005	FC Salyut-Energiya Belgorod	17	(0)

Managerial career
- 2009–2010: FC Torpedo-ZIL Moscow (assistant)
- 2011–2014: FC Ufa (assistant)
- 2014–2015: FC Kaluga (assistant)
- 2017–2018: FC Zorky Krasnogorsk (assistant)
- 2018–: FC Khimki (GK coach)
- * Club domestic league appearances and goals

Yevgeni Vasilyevich Kornyukhin (Russian: Евгений Васильевич Корнюхин; born 7 March 1967) is a Russian professional football coach and a former player. He is a goalkeepers' coach with FC Khimki.

== Club career ==
He made his professional debut in the Soviet Second League in 1988 for FC Pakhtakor Andijan.

== Honours ==
- Russian Premier League bronze: 2000.
- Russian Cup finalist: 2005 (played in the early stages of the 2004/05 tournament for FC Khimki).
- Russian Second Division Zone Center best goalkeeper: 2005.

== European club competitions ==
- UEFA Intertoto Cup 1998 with FC Shinnik Yaroslavl: 3 games.
- UEFA Cup 2000–01 with FC Torpedo Moscow: 1 game.
