= FC Spartak Rybnoye =

Russian football club

- Full name: Football Club Spartak Rybnoye
- Founded: 1997
- Dissolved: 1997
- League: Russian Third League, Zone 4
- 1997: Excluded

FC Spartak Rybnoye (Russian: «Спартак» (Рыбное)) was an association football team from Rybnoye, Ryazan Oblast, Russia. It played professionally for one season in 1997 in the Russian Third League. It was excluded from the league after playing eighteen games.
