= Andrei Gubernsky =

Russian footballer

Personal information
- Full name: Andrei Nikolayevich Gubernsky
- Date of birth: 20 January 1970 (age 56)
- Height: 1.78 m (5 ft 10 in)
- Position: Forward

Youth career
- SDYuShOR-2 Sovetskogo RONO Moscow
- EShVSM Moscow

Senior career*
Years	Team	Apps	(Gls)
1987–1990	FC Zvezda Moscow	40	(10)
1990–1993	FC Asmaral Moscow	70	(41)
1993	→ FC Asmaral-d Moscow (loan)	1	(0)
- * Club domestic league appearances and goals

Andrei Nikolayevich Gubernsky (Russian: Андрей Николаевич Губернский; born 20 January 1970) is a former Russian football player.
