= Vitali Milenin =

Russian footballer

Personal information
- Full name: Vitali Yevgenyevich Milenin
- Date of birth: 16 August 1966 (age 60)
- Place of birth: Yelets, Russian SFSR
- Height: 1.80 m (5 ft 11 in)
- Position: Midfielder

Senior career*
Years	Team	Apps	(Gls)
1984	FC Metallurg Lipetsk	13	(0)
1989–1992	FC Metallurg Lipetsk	137	(23)
1993–1996	FC KAMAZ Naberezhnye Chelny	70	(0)
1993	→ FC KAMAZ-d Naberezhnye Chelny	5	(2)
1998–2002	FC Spartak Tambov	142	(34)
2003	FC Yelets	27	(2)
- * Club domestic league appearances and goals

Vitali Yevgenyevich Milenin (Russian: Виталий Евгеньевич Миленин; born 16 August 1966) is a former Russian professional footballer.

== Club career ==
He made his professional debut in the Soviet Second League in 1984 for FC Metallurg Lipetsk.
