= Ruslan Okhtov =

Russian footballer

Personal information
- Full name: Ruslan Umarovich Okhtov
- Date of birth: 1 December 1978 (age 47)
- Place of birth: Cherkessk, Russian SFSR
- Height: 1.70 m (5 ft 7 in)
- Positions: Forward; midfielder

Youth career
- SUOR Stavropol
- DYuSSh-2 Cherkessk

Senior career*
Years	Team	Apps	(Gls)
1995	FC Mozdok	1	(0)
1995–1996	FC Zhemchuzhina Sochi	3	(0)
1995–1996	→ FC Zhemchuzhina-2 Sochi (loans)	23	(3)
1997	FC Kuban Krasnodar	0	(0)
1997	→ FC Kuban-d Krasnodar (loan)	14	(0)
1998	FC Nart Cherkessk	27	(1)
1999	FC Nart Cherkessk (amateur)		
1999	FC Samotlor-XXI Nizhnevartovsk	15	(2)
2000–2003	FC Baltika Kaliningrad	85	(13)
2012	FC Nart Cherkessk (amateur)		
2013	FC Kyarcha Chapayevskoye		
- * Club domestic league appearances and goals

Ruslan Umarovich Okhtov (Russian: Руслан Умарович Охтов; born 1 December 1978) is a former Russian football player.
