= Aleksandr Khalzov =

Russian footballer

Personal information
- Full name: Aleksandr Ivanovich Khalzov
- Date of birth: February 26, 1965 (age 61)
- Place of birth: Tambov, Russian SFSR
- Height: 1.79 m (5 ft 10 1/2 in)
- Positions: Striker; defender

Senior career*
Years	Team	Apps	(Gls)
1982–1984	FC Spartak Tambov	45	(2)
1984–1985	FShM Moscow	19	(0)
1985–1986	FC Spartak Kostroma	14	(1)
1988–1989	FC Spartak Tambov	62	(22)
1990–1991	FC Metallurg Lipetsk	71	(37)
1992–1993	BFC Siófok	13	(0)
1993–1994	FC Metallurg Lipetsk	42	(29)
1995–1996	FC Ilves	22	(1)
1996–1997	FC Spartak Tambov	56	(37)

Managerial career
- 2007: FC Spartak Tambov (executive director)
- 2008: FC Spartak Tambov (general director)
- * Club domestic league appearances and goals

Aleksandr Ivanovich Khalzov (Russian: Александр Иванович Хальзов; born February 26, 1965) is a retired Russian professional footballer.

== Club career ==
He made his Russian Football National League debut for FC Metallurg Lipetsk on 23 September 1993 in a game against FC Tekstilshchik Ivanovo. He played 2 seasons in the FNL for Metallurg.

== Honours ==
- Russian Third League Zone 5 top scorer: 1996 (25 goals).
