= FC MEPhI Moscow =

- Full name: Football Club MEPhI Moscow
- Founded: 1996
- Dissolved: 1998
- League: Russian Third League, Zone 3
- 1997: 19th

FC MEPhI Moscow (Russian: МИФИ (Москва)) was a Russian football team from Moscow. It played professionally for one season in 1997, taking 19th place in Zone 3 of the Russian Third Division. They were based at the Moscow university MEPhI.

== Team name history ==
- 1996: FSh MEPhI Moscow (for "Football School")
- 1997: FC MEPhI Moscow
