= FC Saturn Naberezhnye Chelny =

- Full name: Football Club Saturn Naberezhnye Chelny
- Founded: 2001
- Dissolved: 2006

FC Saturn Naberezhnye Chelny (Russian: «Сатурн» (Набережные Челны)) was a Russian football team from Naberezhnye Chelny. It played professionally in the Russian Second Division for one season in 2005, when it came in the last, 19th place in the Ural-Povolzhye Zone and was relegated back to amateur levels.
