= Aleksandr Pavlenko (footballer, born 1976) =

Russian footballer and coach

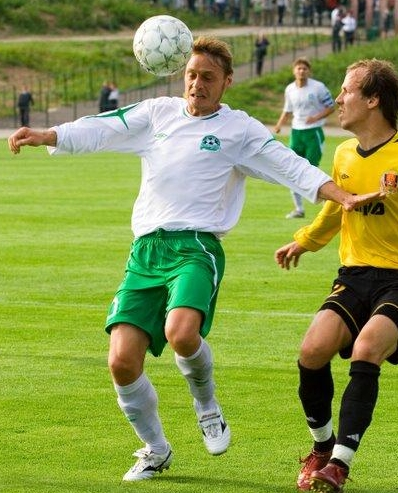

Personal information
- Full name: Aleksandr Vladimirovich Pavlenko
- Date of birth: 23 November 1976 (age 49)
- Place of birth: Moscow, Russian SFSR
- Height: 1.76 m (5 ft 9 in)
- Positions: Midfielder; forward

Team information
- Current team: FC FShM-Torpedo Moscow (manager)

Youth career
- FShM Moscow

Senior career*
Years	Team	Apps	(Gls)
1994–1996	FC Spartak-d Moscow	96	(9)
1996	FC Spartak Moscow	2	(0)
1997	FC Tyumen	32	(0)
1998	FC Spartak-2 Moscow	17	(1)
1998	FC Irtysh Omsk	19	(0)
1999–2000	FC Spartak-Chukotka Moscow	54	(3)
2000	FC Metallurg Krasnoyarsk	17	(1)
2001–2002	FK Liepājas Metalurgs	52	(7)
2003–2004	FC Oryol	63	(3)
2005	FC Shatura		
2006	FC Oryol	31	(0)
2007	FC Zelenograd Moscow	24	(0)

Managerial career
- 2008–: FC FShM-Torpedo Moscow
- * Club domestic league appearances and goals

Aleksandr Vladimirovich Pavlenko (Russian: Александр Владимирович Павленко; born 23 November 1976) is a Russian professional football coach and a former player. He works as a coach for FC FShM-Torpedo Moscow.

== Club career ==
He made his professional debut in the Russian Third Division in 1994 for FC Spartak-d Moscow.

== Honours ==
- Russian Premier League champion: 1996.
- Latvian Higher League 3rd place: 2001, 2002.
