= 1990 Cup of the Ukrainian SSR =

Kubok Ukrainy

Tournament details
- Country: Ukrainian SSR
- Teams: 19

Final positions
- Champions: Polissya Zhytomyr
- Runners-up: Naftovyk Okhtyrka

The Ukrainian Cup 1990 was the 25th edition of the Ukrainian SSR football knockout competition, known as the Ukrainian Cup. The competition started on May 11, 1990, and its final took place on October 28, 1990. The last year cup holder SKA Kiev was knocked out of the competition by Mayak Kharkiv already in the second round.

Polissya Zhytomyr entered the competition in the quarterfinals receiving bye past two rounds.

== Teams ==
=== Tournament distribution ===
The competition was conducted by the clubs of 1991 Soviet Lower Second League, Zone 1 only.

First round (8 teams)	8 entrants from the Lower Second League (Zone 1)	
Second round (14 teams)	10 entrants from the Lower Second League (Zone 1)	4 winners from the first round
Quarterfinals (8 teams)	1 entrant from the Lower Second League (Zone 1) (FC Polissya Zhytomyr)	7 winners from the second round

=== Other professional teams ===
Many Ukrainian professional teams (18) in higher tiers of the Soviet football league pyramid did not take part in the competition.

- 1990 Soviet Top League (5): FC Chornomorets Odesa, FC Dynamo Kyiv, FC Dnipro Dnipropetrovsk, FC Metalist Kharkiv, FC Shakhtar Donetsk
- 1990 Soviet First League (2): FC Metalurh Zaporizhia, SC Tavriya Simferopol
- 1990 Soviet Second League (11): FC Bukovyna Chernivtsi, FC Halychyna Drohobych, FC Karpaty Lviv, FC Kremin Kremenchuk, FC Nyva Ternopil, FC Nyva Vinnytsia, SKA Odessa, FC Volyn Lutsk, FC Vorskla Poltava, FC Zakarpattia Uzhhorod, FC Zorya Luhansk

== Competition schedule ==
=== First round (1/16) ===
The first legs were played on 11 May, and the second legs were played on 22 May 1990.

Team 1	Agg.	Team 2	1st leg	2nd leg
Krystal Kherson	1–4	Torpedo Zaporizhia	1–2	0–2
Chaika Sevastopol	0–1	Okean Kerch	0–0	0–1
Prykarpattia Ivano-Frankivsk	1–2	Avanhard Rivne	1–0	0–2
Sudobudivnyk Mykolaiv	0–3	Naftovyk Okhtyrka	0–2	0–1

Notes

The following clubs received bye for the next round: Podillya Khmelnytskyi, Kryvbas Kryvyi Rih, Dynamo Bila Tserkva, Kolos Nikopol, Dnipro Cherkasy, Shakhtar Pavlohrad, SKA Kiev, Mayak Kharkiv, Zirka Kirovohrad, Desna Chernihiv.

=== Second round ===
The first legs were played on 11 June, and the second legs were played on 15 June 1990.

Team 1	Agg.	Team 2	1st leg	2nd leg
Podillya Khmelnytskyi	(a) 3–3	Kryvbas Kryvyi Rih	1–1	2–2
Dynamo Bila Tserkva	3–5	Kolos Nikopol	2–1	1–4
Torpedo Zaporizhia	4–3	Okean Kerch	2–0	2–3
Avanhard Rivne	4–5	Naftovyk Okhtyrka	4–3	0–2
Dnipro Cherkasy	6–5	Shakhtar Pavlohrad	5–1	1–4
SKA Kiev	1–2	Mayak Kharkiv	1–1	0–1
Zirka Kirovohrad	2–2 (a)	Desna Chernihiv	2–1	0–1

=== Quarterfinals ===
Polissya Zhytomyr entered the competition. The first legs were played on 6 July, and the second legs were played on 28 July 1990.

Team 1	Agg.	Team 2	1st leg	2nd leg
Polissya Zhytomyr	5–2	Podillya Khmelnytskyi	4–1	1–1
Kolos Nikopol	1–5	Torpedo Zaporizhia	1–3	0–2
Naftovyk Okhtyrka	6–2	Dnipro Cherkasy	5–1	1–1
Desna Chernihiv	2–1	Mayak Kharkiv	1–0	1–1

=== Semifinals ===
The first legs were played on 2 September, and the second legs were played on 26 September 1990.

Team 1	Agg.	Team 2	1st leg	2nd leg
Torpedo Zaporizhia	0–0 (1–3 p)	Polissya Zhytomyr	0–0	0–0
Naftovyk Okhtyrka	3–2	Desna Chernihiv	3–0	0–2

=== Final ===
The first leg was played on 18 October, and the second leg was played on 28 October 1990.

Team 1	Agg.	Team 2	1st leg	2nd leg
Naftovyk Okhtyrka	3–5	Polissya Zhytomyr	3–1	0–4

==== First leg ====
18 October 1990

Naftovyk Okhtyrka	3–1	Polissya Zhytomyr
Kolesnyk 30', 78'; Popovych 35'		Leonov 5'

Naftovyk Stadium, Okhtyrka
Attendance: 8,000
Referee: Volodymyr Pianykh (Donetsk)

==== Second leg ====
28 October 1990

Polissya Zhytomyr	4–0	Naftovyk Okhtyrka
Zheltonosov 42'; Lapin 52'; Lukashenko 53', 76'		Yermak (red card) 38'

Lenin's Komsomol Stadium, Zhytomyr
Attendance: 8,600
Referee: Myroslav Stupar (Ivano-Frankivsk)

Polissya won 5–3 on aggregate
