= Igor Dubrovskikh =

Russian footballer

Personal information
- Full name: Igor Yevgenyevich Dubrovskikh
- Date of birth: 27 March 1975 (age 51)
- Place of birth: Krasnodar, Russian SFSR
- Height: 1.85 m (6 ft 1 in)
- Position: Midfielder

Senior career*
Years	Team	Apps	(Gls)
1992–1993	FC Lokomotiv-d Moscow	27	(1)
1993	FC Zenit Izhevsk	13	(0)
1994–1997	FC Neftekhimik Nizhnekamsk	97	(0)
1998–1999	FC Gazovik-Gazprom Izhevsk	79	(10)
2000	FC Rotor Volgograd	24	(0)
2000	→ FC Rotor-d Volgograd	4	(0)
2001–2004	FC Gazovik-Gazprom Izhevsk	137	(19)
2005	FC Amur Blagoveshchensk	32	(0)
2006	FC Volgar-Gazprom Astrakhan	14	(1)
2006	FC Dynamo Makhachkala	10	(3)

Managerial career
- 2008–2009: FC Krasnodar (administrator)
- * Club domestic league appearances and goals

Igor Yevgenyevich Dubrovskikh (Russian: Игорь Евгеньевич Дубровских; born 27 March 1975) is a former Russia professional football player.
