= Aleksei Snigiryov =

Russian footballer

Personal information
- Full name: Aleksei Snigiryov
- Date of birth: 19 January 1968 (age 58)
- Place of birth: Pskov, Soviet Union
- Height: 1.78 m (5 ft 10 in)
- Position: Forward

Youth career
- 1984–1985: Mashinostroitel Pskov

Senior career*
Years	Team	Apps	(Gls)
1986–1988	Torpedo Ryazan	86	(8)
1989–1991	Dynamo Moscow	1	(0)
1989	→ Mashinostroitel Pskov (loan)		
1991	Geolog Tyumen	15	(0)
1992	Veres Rivne	35	(16)
1993	KAMAZ Naberezhnye Chelny	3	(0)
1993–1995	Moskovsky-Selyatino	85	(65)
1995–1997	Lokomotiv Moscow	27	(8)
1997–1999	Torpedo-ZIL Moscow	70	(52)
1999	Košice		
2000	Vityaz Podolsk		
2001	Khimki	12	(1)
2001	Pskov-2000	10	(2)
2002	BSK Spirovo	9	(2)
2003	Metallurg Vyksa	16	(5)
2003	Neman Grodno	12	(0)
- * Club domestic league appearances and goals

Aleksei Anatolyevich Snigiryov (Russian: Алексей Анатольевич Снигирёв; born 19 January 1968) is a former Russian professional footballer.

== Club career ==
He made his debut in the Soviet Top League in 1991 for FC Dynamo Moscow.

He is the record holder for the club last known as FC Moscow with most league goals scored for the club (52). The club was called FC Torpedo-ZIL Moscow when Snigiryov played for it.

His last professional club was Neman Grodno in 2003. He continued to play at amateur level in regional Russian leagues until 2008.

== Honours ==
- Russian Premier League runner-up: 1995.
- Russian Cup winner: 1996.
- Russian Second Division Zone West top scorer: 1998 (32 goals).
