= FC Roda Moscow =

- Full name: Football Club Roda Moscow
- Founded: 1995
- Dissolved: 1998
- League: Russian Third League, Zone 3
- 1997: 5th

FC Roda Moscow (Russian: «Рода» (Москва)) was a Russian football team from Moscow. It played professionally in 1996 and 1997. Their best result was 5th place in Zone 3 of the Russian Third League in 1997.
