= FC Kristall Sergach =

- Full name: Football Club Kristall Sergach
- Founded: 1994
- Dissolved: 1999
- League: Amateur Football League, Zone Privolzhye
- 1998: 11th

FC Kristall Sergach (Russian: «Кристалл» (Сергач)) was a Russian football team from Sergach. It played professionally from 1994 to 1996. Their best result was 5th place in Zone 5 of the Russian Third League in 1996.
