= Oleg Sizov =

Russian footballer and coach

Personal information
- Full name: Oleg Gennadyevich Sizov
- Date of birth: 11 June 1963 (age 63)
- Place of birth: Kuybyshev, Russian SFSR
- Height: 1.71 m (5 ft 7 1/2 in)
- Position: Midfielder

Senior career*
Years	Team	Apps	(Gls)
1981	FC Uralets Nizhny Tagil	6	(1)
1982–1984	did not play		
1985–1987	FC Avangard Kamyshin (amateur)		
1987	FC Tekstilshchik Kamyshin (amateur)		
1988–1989	FC Tekstilshchik Kamyshin	48	(7)
1989	FC Rotor Volgograd	1	(0)
1990	FC Tekstilshchik Kamyshin	0	(0)
1990	FC Avangard Kamyshin (amateur)		
1991–1994	FC Avangard Kamyshin	99	(22)
1995–1996	FC Tekstilshchik Kamyshin	1	(0)
1996	FC Energiya-Tekstilshchik-d Kamyshin		
2003	FC Kolos-Dynamo Nikolayevsk		
2006	FC Petrov Val		

Managerial career
- 1997: FC Energiya-d Kamyshin
- * Club domestic league appearances and goals

Oleg Gennadyevich Sizov (Russian: Олег Геннадьевич Сизов; born 11 June 1963, in Kuybyshev) is a former Russian football player and coach.
