= Vyksa =

Town in Nizhny Novgorod Oblast, Russia

Vyksa Выкса
- Town
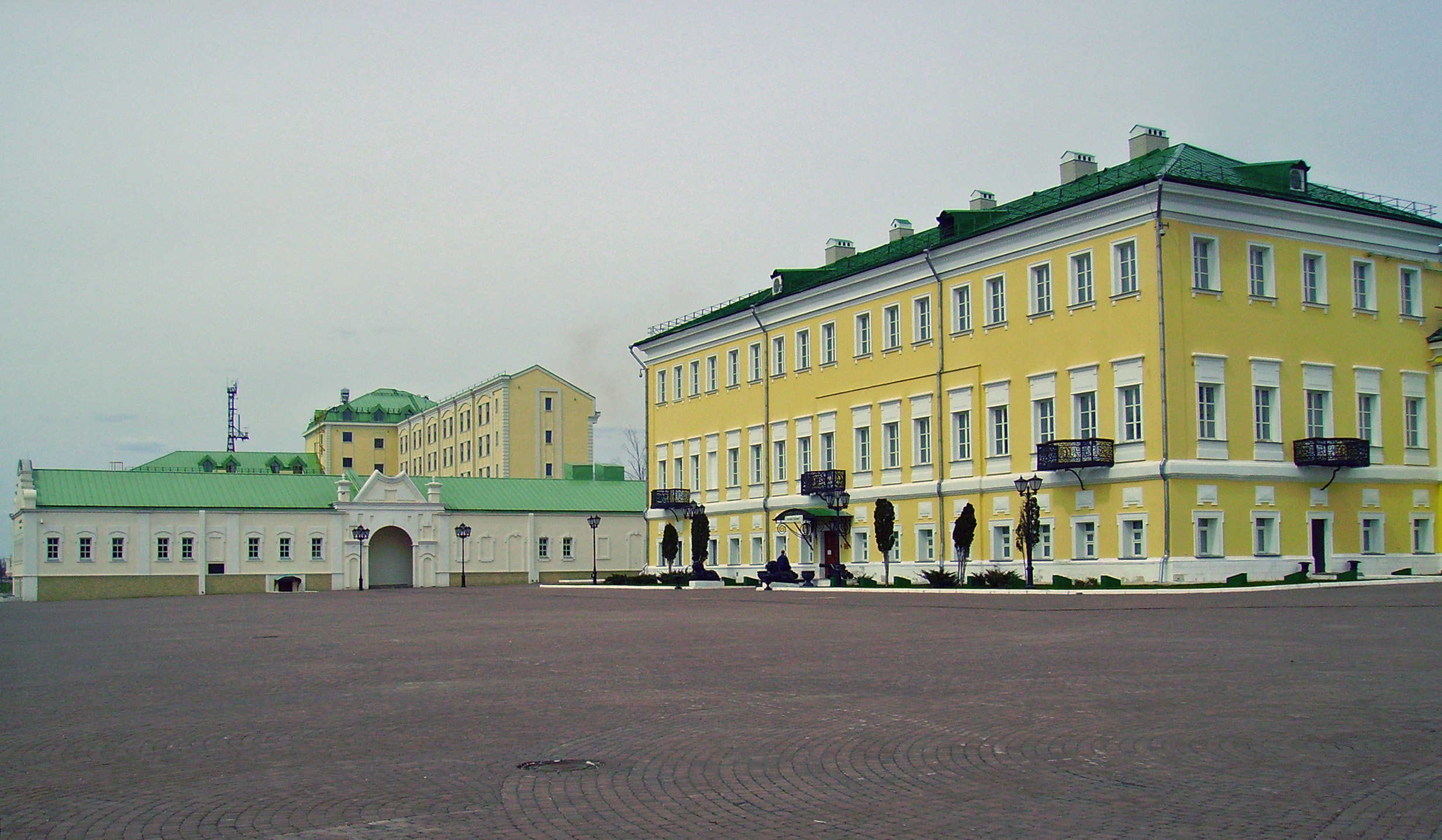

- Flag Coat of arms
- Interactive map of Vyksa
- Location of Vyksa Vyksa (Nizhny Novgorod Oblast)
- Coordinates: 55°19′N 42°10′E
- Country: Russia
- Federal subject: Nizhny Novgorod Oblast
- Founded: 1765
- Town status since: 1934
- Elevation: 110 m (360 ft)

Population (2010 Census)
  - Total: 56,201
  - Estimate (2025): 43,842 (−22%)
  - Rank: 292nd in 2010

Administrative status
  - Subordinated to: town of oblast significance of Vyksa
  - Capital of: town of oblast significance of Vyksa

Municipal status
  - Urban okrug: Vyksa Urban Okrug
  - Capital of: Vyksa Urban Okrug
- Time zone: UTC+3 (MSK)
- Postal code: 607030
- OKTMO ID: 22715000001

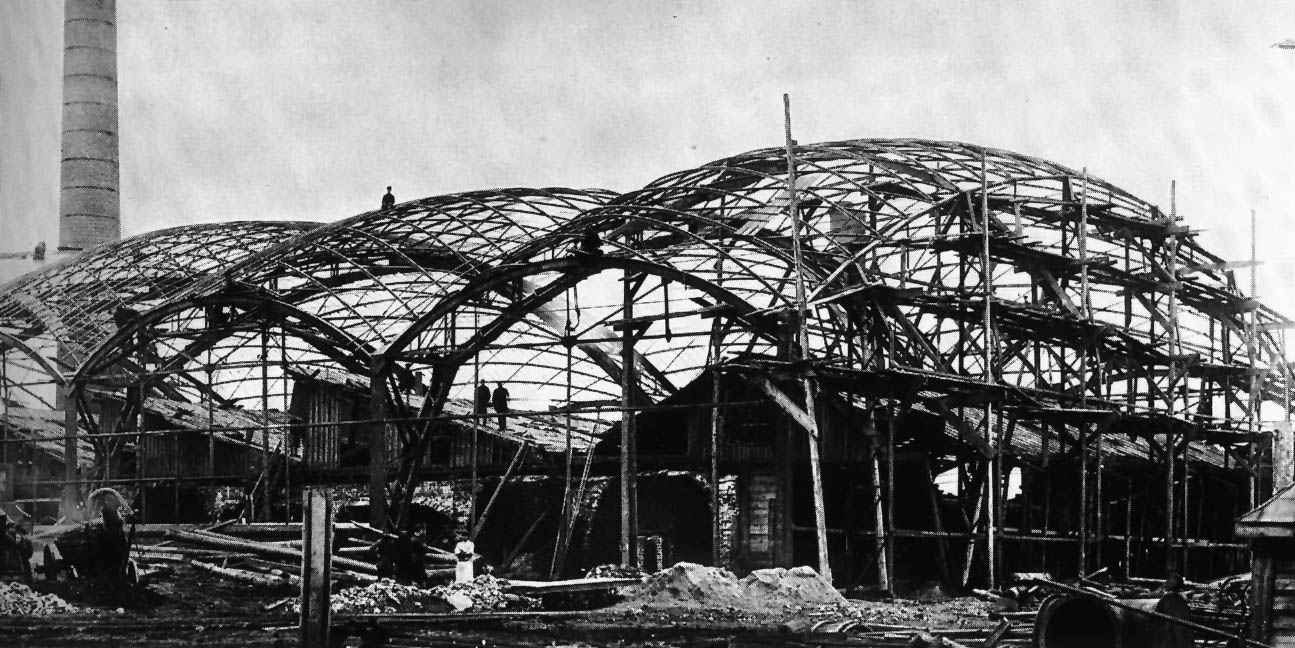
The world's first double curvature diagrid steel gridshell by Vladimir Shukhov (under construction), Vyksa, 1897

Shukhov's diagrid hyperboloid tower in Vyksa

Vyksa (Russian: Вы́кса) is a town in Nizhny Novgorod Oblast, Russia. It is located on the Oka River, 186 kilometers (116 mi) southwest of Nizhny Novgorod. Population: 45,240 (2021 census); 56,201 (2010 census); 61,657 (2002 census); 61,149 (1989 Soviet census).

== Etymology ==
It is named after the Vyksa River. According to Aleksandr Matveyev, vöksa ('lake outflow') is presumably derived from the Meryan form *weksä. Vyksa, which denotes the outflow of a lake near Murom, belongs to the so-called Lower Klyazma zone and is a related form with a different vowel in the first syllable. Matveyev also compares the term with Meadow Mari iksa ('stream between two lakes'), which he considers related to another possible Meryan form, ikšä.

== History ==
Vyksa was founded in 1765 and was granted town status in 1934.

== Administrative and municipal status ==
Within the framework of administrative divisions, it is, together with four work settlements and forty-three rural localities, incorporated as the town of oblast significance of Vyksa—an administrative unit with the status equal to that of the districts. As a municipal division, the town of oblast significance of Vyksa is incorporated as Vyksa Urban Okrug.
