= Pavel Yumatov =

Russian footballer

Personal information
- Full name: Pavel Borisovich Yumatov
- Date of birth: 30 May 1974 (age 52)
- Height: 1.83 m (6 ft 0 in)
- Position: Forward

Team information
- Current team: FC Krylia Sovetov Samara (academy director)

Youth career
- FC Voskhod Samara

Senior career*
Years	Team	Apps	(Gls)
1993	FC Krylia Sovetov Samara	1	(0)
1993–1994	FC SKD Samara	37	(6)
1995–1996	FC Krylia Sovetov Samara	5	(0)
1996–1997	FC Neftyanik Pokhvistnevo	58	(22)
1998	FC Krylia Sovetov Samara	0	(0)
1998–1999	FC Neftyanik Pokhvistnevo	37	(5)
1999–2000	FC Zenit Chelyabinsk	19	(4)

Managerial career
- 2013–2014: FC Krylia Sovetov-TsPF Samara (administrator)
- 2014–: FC Krylia Sovetov Samara (academy director)
- * Club domestic league appearances and goals

Pavel Borisovich Yumatov (Russian: Павел Борисович Юматов; born 25 June 1974) is a former Russian football player. He is the director of the academy of FC Krylia Sovetov Samara.
