= Anri Bestayev =

Russian footballer

Personal information
- Full name: Anri Abriyevich Bestayev
- Date of birth: 22 April 1964 (age 62)
- Place of birth: Ordzhonikidze, now Vladikavkaz, Russian SFSR
- Height: 1.80 m (5 ft 11 in)
- Position: Forward

Senior career*
Years	Team	Apps	(Gls)
1982	FC Spartak Ordzhonikidze	8	(0)
1984–1988	FC Spartak Ordzhonikidze	44	(7)
1987	→ FC Lokomotiv Mineralnye Vody (loan)	15	(3)
1989	FC Lokomotiv Mineralnye Vody	21	(10)
1989	FC Kolkheti-1913 Poti	18	(5)
1990	FC Liakhvi Tskhinvali	4	(0)
1990	FC Dinamo Sukhumi	3	(0)
1990–1991	FC Avtodor Vladikavkaz	15	(4)
1991–1992	FC Spartak Vladikavkaz	23	(1)
1993–1994	FC Avtodor Vladikavkaz	44	(22)
1994	FC Avtozapchast Baksan	13	(7)
1995–1997	FC Avtodor-BMK Vladikavkaz	74	(18)
1998	FC Elkhot Elkhotovo		
2000	FC Alania Oktyabrskoye		
2001	FC Irbis Mikhaylovsk		
- * Club domestic league appearances and goals

Anri Abriyevich Bestayev (Russian: Анри Абриевич Бестаев; born 22 April 1964) is a retired Russian football player.

== Honours ==
- Russian Top League runner-up: 1992.
