= Hennadiy Perepadenko =

Ukrainian footballer

Personal information
- Full name: Hennadiy Oleksandrovych Perepadenko
- Date of birth: 16 June 1964 (age 62)
- Place of birth: Zaporizhzhia, Ukrainian SSR, Soviet Union
- Height: 1.82 m (6 ft 0 in)
- Position: Midfielder

Senior career*
Years	Team	Apps	(Gls)
1982–1983	Metalurh Zaporizhya	31	(5)
1984–1985	SKA Odesa		
1985–1989	Chornomorets	121	(16)
1990–1992	Spartak Moscow	51	(6)
1992	Tzafririm Holon	12	(7)
1993–1995	Badajoz	53	(9)

International career
1990	USSR	3	(0)
- * Club domestic league appearances and goals

Hennadiy Perepadenko (born 16 June 1964) is a Ukrainian former professional footballer who played for Ukrainian clubs Metalurh Zaporizhya and Chornomorets Odesa, for Russian club Spartak Moscow, for Israeli club Tzafririm Holon and for Spanish club CD Badajoz. At international level, he made three appearances for the USSR national team.

== Career ==
A native of Zaporizhzhia, Perepadenko played professional football until the age of 31. His most notable successes were with Soviet Top League side Spartak Moscow, where he helped the club reach the semi-finals of the 1990–91 European Cup.

Perepadenko began playing football with local side FC Metalurh Zaporizhya before playing for SKA Odesa while serving in the Soviet military. After he completed military service, Perepadenko joined Soviet Top League side Chornomorets Odesa. Spartak Moscow manager Oleg Romantsev signed Perepadenko in 1990, and the winger helped the club finish second in the last Soviet Top League championship and win the first Russian championship. Perepadenko was named to the list of the top 33 Soviet footballers in 1991.

Late in his career, Perepadenko moved to Spain where he joined Segunda División side CD Badajoz. He initially struggled to fit in, and was fined by manager Marco Antonio Boroñat for showing up late to training. Perepadenko made 81 competitive appearances and scored nine goals for Badajoz, including a hat-trick against Real Burgos CF during the 1993–94 Segunda División season.

His younger brother Serhiy Perepadenko also played football professionally.

After he retired from playing, Perepadenko moved to Barcelona where he started a business with his brother. In 2003, he joined former footballer Igor Belanov in investing in troubled Swiss side FC Wil.
