= FC Spartak-Bratskiy Yuzhny =

- Full name: Football Club Spartak-Bratskiy Yuzhny
- Founded: 1994
- Dissolved: 1998
- League: Russian Third League, Zone 2
- 1996: 4th

FC Spartak-Bratskiy Yuzhny (Russian: «Спартак‑Братский» (Южный)) was a Russian football team from Yuzhny, Rostov Oblast. It played professionally from 1994 to 1997. Their best result was 4th place in Zone 2 of the Russian Third League in 1996 and 1997.
