= Anatoli Sedykh =

Russian footballer

Personal information
- Full name: Anatoli Yuryevich Sedykh
- Date of birth: 1 May 1970 (age 56)
- Height: 1.78 m (5 ft 10 in)
- Positions: Forward; midfielder

Youth career
- ShISP Volgograd

Senior career*
Years	Team	Apps	(Gls)
1986–1988	Torpedo Volzhsky	27	(2)
1988	Tekstilshchik Kamyshin	21	(1)
1989	CSKA Moscow	0	(0)
1989	→ Chaika-CSKA-2 Moscow	10	(0)
1989	→ SKA-Karpaty Lviv (loan)	25	(1)
1990	SFC Drohobych	37	(0)
1991	Tekstilshchik Kamyshin	19	(2)
1991–1992	Rotor Volgograd	37	(5)
1993	Zvezda-Rus Gorodische	14	(2)
1994–1996	Uralan Elista	70	(11)
1996	Olimp Kislovodsk	24	(8)
1997	Dynamo Stavropol	11	(2)
1998	Lokomotiv-Taym Mineralnye Vody	29	(7)
1999	Slavyansk Slavyansk-na-Kubani	3	(0)
1999	Kuban Krasnodar	12	(1)
2000–2002	Spartak Anapa	59	(17)
2003	Vityaz Krymsk	14	(3)
2003	Spartak Anapa	19	(5)
2004	Olimpia Volgograd	14	(1)
2004	Druzhba Maykop	6	(0)
2005	SKA Rostov-on-Don	16	(2)
2006	Lokomotiv Minsk	10	(2)
- * Club domestic league appearances and goals

Anatoli Yuryevich Sedykh (Russian: Анатолий Юрьевич Седых; born 1 May 1970) is a former Russian football player.
