= Serhiy Perepadenko =

Ukrainian footballer

Personal information
- Full name: Serhiy Oleksandrovych Perepadenko
- Date of birth: 26 May 1972 (age 54)
- Place of birth: Zaporizhzhia, Ukrainian SSR
- Height: 1.72 m (5 ft 7 1/2 in)
- Positions: Striker; midfielder

Youth career
- FC Metalurh Zaporizhya

Senior career*
| Years | Team | Apps | (Gls) |
| 1989–1990 | FC Torpedo Zaporizhia | 5 | (0) |
| 1990–1992 | FC Spartak Moscow | 1 | (0) |
| 1994–1996 | FC Lokomotiv Moscow | 14 | (1) |
| 1997–2007 | UD Vista Alegre (amateur) | | |
| 2007–2008 | UE Sitges (amateur) | | |
- * Club domestic league appearances and goals

Serhiy Oleksandrovych Perepadenko (Ukrainian: Сергій Олександрович Перепаденко; Russian: Серге́й Александрович Перепаденко; born 26 May 1972) is a former Ukrainian professional footballer.

== Club career ==
He made his professional debut in the Soviet Second League in 1989 for FC Torpedo Zaporizhia.

== Personal life ==
He is the younger brother of Hennadiy Perepadenko.

== Honours ==
- Soviet Top League runner-up: 1991.
- Soviet Cup winner: 1992.
- Russian Premier League runner-up: 1995.
- Russian Premier League bronze: 1994.
