= FC Neftyanik Ufa =

- Full name: Football Club Neftyanik Ufa
- Founded: 1957
- Dissolved: 2006
- 2005: Russian Second Division, Zone Ural/Povolzhye, 5th

FC Neftyanik Ufa (Russian: ФК «Нефтяник» Уфа) was a Russian football team from Ufa. It played professionally in 1957, from 1957 to 1995 and from 2002 to 2005. It played on the second-highest level (Soviet First League and Russian First Division) in 1947, 1957–1962, 1966–1969 and 1992. A new team from Ufa, FC Bashinformsvyaz-Dynamo Ufa, started playing professionally in 2009.

== Team name history ==
- 1957 Neftyanik Ufa
- 1958 Devon Ufa
- 1959–1976 Stroitel Ufa
- 1977–1992 Gastello Ufa
- 1993 KDS Samrau Ufa
- 1994 Estel Ufa
- 1995–1996 Agidel Ufa
- 1997 Stroitel Ufa
- 1998 Voskhod Ufa
- 2000–2003 Stroitel Ufa
- 2003–2006 Neftyanik Ufa
