= FC Metallurg Vyksa =

Russian football club

- Full name: Football Club «Metallurg» Vyksa
- Nicknames: Metallurgists, Steelworkers
- Founded: 1923
- Dissolved: 2015
- Stadium: «Metallurg» Vyksa
- Capacity: 7,000
- Chairman: Andrey Ostashkin
- Coach: Andrey Lysov
- 2013–14: Russian Professional Football League, 13th
- Website: https://металлургвыкса.рф/ official website
Home colours	Away colours

FC Metallurg Vyksa (Russian: «Металлург» (Выкса)) is a Russian football team from Vyksa. It played professionally from 1994 to 1997, from 1999 to 2003 and again from the 2012–13 season until February 2015. Their best result was 4th place in Zone Povolzhye of the Russian Second Division in 2000.

In late February 2015, during the 2014–15 season's winter break, the team's main sponsor, Vyksa Steel Works, announced they can no longer afford to support the team on the professional level. All the players and staff were released from their contracts and all the remaining games of the season were forfeited.

== See also ==
FC Metallurg Vyksa (in Russian)
