= FC Niva Slavyansk-na-Kubani =

- Full name: Football Club Niva Slavyansk-na-Kubani
- Founded: 1990
- Dissolved: 1998
- League: Russian Third League, Zone 2
- 1997: 5th

FC Niva Slavyansk-na-Kubani (Russian: «Нива» (Славянск‑на‑Кубани)) was a Russian football team from Slavyansk-na-Kubani. It played professionally from 1990 to 1997. Their best result was 10th place in the Zone 2 of the Russian Second Division in 1993.

== Team name history ==
- 1990–1991 – FC Golubaya Niva Slavyansk-na-Kubani
- 1992–1997 – FC Niva Slavyansk-na-Kubani
