= FC Lokomotiv Kaluga =

Russian football club

- Full name: Football Club Lokomotiv Kaluga
- Founded: 1936
- Ground: Central Stadium
- Capacity: 2000
- Chairman: Vyacheslav Dubrovin
- Manager: Vitaly Safronov
- League: Amateur Football League, Zone Chernozemic
- 2009: 2nd

FC Lokomotiv Kaluga (Russian: Локомотив (Калуга) is a Russian football team from Kaluga that currently plays in Amateur Football League. It played professionally from 1965 to 1982 and from 1997 to 2006. Their best result was 13th place in the Soviet First League in 1968 (it played on that second-highest level from 1967 to 1969). Champion of the RSFSR in 1966 and 1977.

== Team name history ==
- 1936–1982: FC Lokomotiv Kaluga
- 1996: FC Smena-PRMZ Kaluga
- 1997–present: FC Lokomotiv Kaluga
