= 1995 in Russian football =

1995 season

1995 was the fourth season Russia held its own national football competition since the breakup of the Soviet Union.

== Club competitions ==
FC Spartak-Alania Vladikavkaz won the league for the first time ever.

This was the first season 3 points were awarded for a win instead of two.

For more details, see:

- 1995 Russian Top League
- 1995 Russian First League
- 1995 Russian Second League
- 1995 Russian Third League

== Cup competitions ==
The third edition of the Russian Cup, 1994–95 Russian Cup was won by FC Dynamo Moscow, who beat FC Rotor Volgograd in the finals in a shootout 8-7 after finishing extra time at 0-0.

Early stages of the 1995–96 Russian Cup were played later in the year.

== European club competitions ==
=== 1994–95 UEFA Champions League, 1994–95 UEFA Cup Winners' Cup and 1994–95 UEFA Cup ===
All the Russian participants were eliminated in 1994.

=== 1995–96 UEFA Champions League ===
FC Spartak Moscow won every game in their group, qualifying for the quarterfinals.

- September 13, 1993 / Group B, Day 1 / Blackburn Rovers F.C. - FC Spartak Moscow 0-1 (Yuran 41') / Blackburn, Ewood Park / Attendance: 20,390

FC Spartak Moscow: Cherchesov, Khlestov, Nikiforov, Tsymbalar, Mamedov, Yuran, Onopko (captain), Kulkov, Shmarov (Kechinov, 89), Piatnitski, Tikhonov.

- September 27, 1993 / Group B, Day 2 / FC Spartak Moscow - Legia Warszawa 2-1 (Nikiforov 13' (pen.) Yuran 52' - Jóźwiak 82') / Moscow, Luzhniki Stadium / Attendance: 55,000

FC Spartak Moscow: Cherchesov, Khlestov, Nikiforov, Tsymbalar, Mamedov, Yuran, Onopko (captain), Kulkov, Shmarov, Piatnitski, Tikhonov.

- October 18, 1995 / Group B, Day 3 / Rosenborg BK - FC Spartak Moscow 2-4 (Løken 2' Brattbakk 44' - Alenichev 59' Kechinov 65' 82' Nikiforov 65') / Trondheim, Lerkendal Stadion / Attendance: 40,000

FC Spartak Moscow: Cherchesov, Khlestov, Nikiforov, Tsymbalar, Mamedov, Yuran, Onopko (captain), Kulkov, Shmarov (Kechinov, 58), Piatnitski (Alenichev, 46), Tikhonov.

- November 1, 1995 / Group B, Day 4 / FC Spartak Moscow - Rosenborg BK 4-1 (Shmarov 2' Yuran 9' Tsymbalar 19' Tikhonov 79' - Løken 90') / Moscow, Luzhniki Stadium / Attendance: 40,000

FC Spartak Moscow: Cherchesov, Khlestov, Nikiforov, Tsymbalar (Kechinov, 46), Ananko, Yuran, Onopko (captain), Kulkov, Shmarov, Alenichev (Titov, 85), Tikhonov.

- November 22, 1995 / Group B, Day 5 / FC Spartak Moscow - Blackburn Rovers F.C. 3-0 (Alenichev 29' Nikiforov 48' Mamedov 57') / Moscow, Luzhniki Stadium / Attendance: 35,000

FC Spartak Moscow: Cherchesov, Khlestov, Nikiforov, Tsymbalar, Mamedov, Yuran (Piatnitski, 74), Onopko (captain), Kulkov, Shmarov (Kechinov, 67), Alenichev, Tikhonov (Mukhamadiev, 87).

- December 6, 1995 / Group B, Day 6 / Legia Warszawa - FC Spartak Moscow 0-1 (Mamedov 41') / Warsaw, Polish Army Stadium / Attendance: 15,000

FC Spartak Moscow: Cherchesov, Khlestov, Nikiforov, Tsymbalar, Mamedov, Kechinov, Onopko (captain) (Ananko, 82), Kulkov, Shmarov, Alenichev, Tikhonov.

=== 1995–96 UEFA Cup Winners' Cup ===
FC Dynamo Moscow advanced through the first two rounds, qualifying to play in the quarterfinals next spring.

- September 14, 1995 / First Round, First Leg / FC Dynamo Moscow - FC Ararat Yerevan 3-1 (Teryokhin 45' 90' Safronov 73' - Stepanyan 71') / Moscow, Dynamo Stadium / Attendance: 7,500

FC Dynamo Moscow: Smetanin (captain), Yakhimovich, Shulgin, Kolotovkin, Sabitov (Tishkov, 79), Kobelev (Grishin, 55), Samatov, Cheryshev (Safronov, 62), S. Nekrasov, Kuznetsov, Teryokhin.

- September 28, 1995 / First Round, Return Leg / FC Ararat Yerevan - FC Dynamo Moscow 0-1 (Teryokhin 65') / Yerevan, Hrazdan Stadium / Attendance: 20,000

FC Dynamo Moscow: Kleimyonov, Grishin (Kobelev, 85), Kovtun, Kolotovkin, Shulgin, Kuznetsov, Samatov, Cheryshev, S. Nekrasov (Safronov, 85), Podpaly (captain), Teryokhin.

- October 19, 1995 / Second Round, First Leg / FC Dynamo Moscow - SK Hradec Králové 1-0 (Kuznetsov 59') / Moscow, Dynamo Stadium / Attendance: 4,000

FC Dynamo Moscow: Kleimyonov, Kuznetsov, Kovtun, S. Nekrasov, Shulgin, Kobelev (Grishin, 46), Samatov, Cheryshev, Safronov, Podpaly (captain), Tishkov (Kutsenko, 78).

- November 2, 1995 / Second Round, Return Leg / SK Hradec Králové - FC Dynamo Moscow 1–0 (Kaplan 15') 1-3 in shootout (Drozd (penalty missed) Černý (penalty missed) Dzubara (penalty missed) Holub (penalty scored) - Kobelev (penalty scored) Teryokhin (penalty missed) Samatov (penalty scored) Kovtun (penalty scored) ) / Hradec Králové, Všesportovní Stadion / Attendance: 11,540

FC Dynamo Moscow: Smetanin, Kuznetsov, Kovtun, Kolotovkin, Yakhimovich, Grishin, Samatov, Cheryshev (Kobelev, 120), Safronov (Tishkov, 70), Podpaly (captain), Teryokhin.

=== 1995–96 UEFA Cup ===
FC Spartak-Alania Vladikavkaz and FC Lokomotiv Moscow were eliminated in the first round by strong opponents (even though Lokomotiv very unexpectedly beat FC Bayern in Munich in the first game). FC Rotor Volgograd eliminated Manchester United F.C. in the first round, but went out in the second round.

- September 12, 1995 / First Round, First Leg / FC Bayern Munich - FC Lokomotiv Moscow 0-1 (Kharlachyov 71') / Munich, Olympic Stadium / Attendance: 16,000

FC Lokomotiv Moscow: Ovchinnikov, Arifullin, Drozdov, Kharlachyov, Hovhannisyan, Chugainov, Kosolapov (captain), Gurenko, Elyshev, Solomatin, Garin (Maminov, 82).

- September 12, 1995 / First Round, First Leg / FC Rotor Volgograd - Manchester United F.C. 0-0 / Volgograd, Central Stadium / Attendance: 40,000

FC Rotor Volgograd: Samorukov, Shmarko, Burlachenko, Gerashchenko (captain), Yeshchenko, Zhunenko, Korniyets, Niederhaus, Veretennikov, Yesipov, Zernov (Krivov, 80).

- September 12, 1995 / First Round, First Leg / FC Spartak-Alania Vladikavkaz - Liverpool F.C. 1-2 (Qosimov 21' - McManaman 33' Redknapp 53') / Vladikavkaz, Republican Spartak Stadium / Attendance: 43,000

FC Spartak-Alania Vladikavkaz: Khapov, Pagayev (Timofeev, 46), Gorlukovich (Kornienko, 81), Shelia, Dzhioyev (captain), Tetradze, Tedeyev, Yanovskiy, Qosimov (Derkach, 46), Kanishchev, Kavelashvili.

- September 26, 1995 / First Round, Return Leg / FC Lokomotiv Moscow - FC Bayern Munich 0-5 (Klinsmann 26' 35' Herzog 39' Scholl 45' Strunz 79') / Moscow, Lokomotiv Stadium / Attendance: 20,000

FC Lokomotiv Moscow: Ovchinnikov, Arifullin, Drozdov, Kharlachyov, Solomatin, Chugainov, Kosolapov (captain), Gurenko (Pashinin, 10; Maminov, 46), Elyshev, Kuznetsov, Garin.

- September 26, 1995 / First Round, Return Leg / Manchester United F.C. - FC Rotor Volgograd 2-2 (Scholes 60' Schmeichel 89' - Niederhaus 18' Veretennikov 25') / Manchester, Old Trafford / Attendance: 29.724

FC Rotor Volgograd: Samorukov, Shmarko, Burlachenko, Berketov, Yeshchenko (Tsarenko, 70), Zhunenko, Korniyets, Niederhaus (Krivov, 79), Veretennikov (captain), Yesipov, Zernov (Ilyushin, 74).

- September 26, 1995 / First Round, Return Leg / Liverpool F.C. - FC Spartak-Alania Vladikavkaz 0-0 / Liverpool, Anfield / Attendance: 35,042

FC Spartak-Alania Vladikavkaz: Khapov, Pagayev, Kornienko (Derkach, 46), Shelia, Dzhioyev (captain), Tetradze, Tedeyev, Yanovskiy, Qosimov, Suleymanov, Kanishchev (Timofeev, 46).

- October 17, 1995 / Second Round, First Leg / FC Girondins de Bordeaux - FC Rotor Volgograd 2-1 (Histilloles 47' Witschge 90' (pen.) - Niederhaus 40') / Bordeaux, Parc Lescure / Attendance: 20,000

FC Rotor Volgograd: Samorukov, Shmarko, Berketov, Gerashchenko (captain), Yeshchenko, Zhunenko, Korniyets, Niederhaus (Ilyushin, 87), Veretennikov, Yesipov, Zernov (Krivov, 84).

- October 31, 1995 / Second Round, Return Leg / FC Rotor Volgograd - FC Girondins de Bordeaux 0-1 (Bancarel 84') / Volgograd, Central Stadium / Attendance: 25,000

FC Rotor Volgograd: Samorukov, Shmarko, Burlachenko, Gerashchenko (captain), Yeshchenko, Berketov, Korniyets, Niederhaus, Veretennikov, Yesipov, Zernov (Ilyushin, 67).

== National team ==
Russia national football team qualified for the UEFA Euro 1996, winning their group. Oleg Romantsev was the manager that year, with Aleksandr Tarkhanov, Boris Ignatyev and Sergei Pavlov assisting.

- March 8, 1995 / Friendly / Slovakia - Russia 2-1 (Dubovský 29' 69' - Karpin 78' Afanasyev (yellow card) 25' (red card) ) / Košice, Všešportový areál / Attendance: 10,200

Russia: Cherchesov, Gorlukovich, Nikiforov (captain), Tsymbalar (Khlestov, 30), Shalimov, Karpin, Afanasyev, Kanchelskis, Rakhimov (Kovtun, 75), Radchenko (Mostovoi, 46), Pisarev (Beschastnykh, 46).

- March 29, 1995 / UEFA Euro 1996 qualifier / Russia - Scotland 0-0 / Moscow, Luzhniki Stadium / Attendance: 37,000

Russia: Kharine, Khlestov, Nikiforov, Kovtun, Shalimov (Radimov, 68), Karpin, Onopko (captain), Kanchelskis, Dobrovolski, Radchenko (Pisarev, 58), Kiriakov.

- April 26, 1995 / UEFA Euro 1996 qualifier / Greece - Russia 0-3 (Kalitsakis (red card) 25' - Nikiforov 35' Zagorakis 80' (o.g.) Beschastnykh 82') / Thessaloniki, Kaftanzoglio Stadium / Attendance: 50,000

Russia: Kharine, Kulkov, Nikiforov, Kovtun, Khlestov, Karpin, Onopko (captain), Piatnitski (Kiriakov, 46), Dobrovolski, Radchenko (Mostovoi, 75), Beschastnykh.

- May 6, 1995 / UEFA Euro 1996 qualifier / Russia - Faroe Islands 3-0 (Kechinov 53' Pisarev 73' Mukhamadiev 80') / Moscow, Luzhniki Stadium / Attendance: 10,000

Russia: Cherchesov, Khlestov, Nikiforov, Kovtun, Tetradze, Kechinov, Onopko (captain), Cheryshev, Piatnitski (Lebed, 20), Pisarev, Mukhamadiev.

- May 31, 1995 / Friendly / FR Yugoslavia - Russia 1-2 (Petković 34' - Karpin 33' (pen.) Beschastnykh 40') / Belgrade, Stadion Crvena Zvezda / Attendance: 40,000

Russia: Kharine (Cherchesov, 46), Khlestov, Tetradze, Kovtun, Kulkov (Mamedov, 78), Karpin, Onopko (captain), Cheryshev (Afanasyev, 57), Beschastnykh, Shalimov, Kiriakov.

- June 7, 1995 / UEFA Euro 1996 qualifier / San Marino - Russia 0-7 (Dobrovolski 22' (pen.) Kulkov 38' Kiriakov 47' Shalimov 48' Beschastnykh 58' Kolyvanov 63' Cheryshev 87') / Serravalle, Stadio Olimpico / Attendance: 1,367

Russia: Cherchesov, Kulkov, Tetradze, Kovtun, Shalimov, Karpin, Onopko (captain), Kolyvanov, Beschastnykh, Dobrovolski (Radchenko, 59), Kiriakov (Cheryshev, 85).

- August 16, 1995 / UEFA Euro 1996 qualifier / Finland - Russia 0-6 (Kulkov 32' 49' Karpin 39' Radchenko 42' Kolyvanov 67' 69') / Helsinki, Helsinki Olympic Stadium / Attendance: 14,210

Russia: Kharine (Cherchesov, 82), Kovtun, Nikiforov, Tsymbalar, Khlestov, Onopko (captain), Kulkov, Karpin (Kanchelskis, 61), Mostovoi, Radchenko (Kiriakov, 68), Kolyvanov.

- September 6, 1995 / UEFA Euro 1996 qualifier / Faroe Islands - Russia 2:5 (H. Jarnskor 12' Jónsson 55' - Mostovoi 9' (pen.) Kiriakov 61' Kolyvanov 65' Tsymbalar 83' Shalimov 88') / Toftir, Svangaskarð / Attendance: 3,000

Russia: Cherchesov, Kovtun, Nikiforov, Tsymbalar, Shalimov, Kanchelskis (Beschastnykh, 57), Onopko (captain), Kulkov (Mamedov, 64), Mostovoi, Radchenko (Kiriakov, 46), Kolyvanov.

- October 11, 1995 / UEFA Euro 1996 qualifier / Russia - Greece 2-1 (Ouzounidis 38' (o.g.) Onopko 71' - Tsalouchidis 64') / Moscow, Luzhniki Stadium / Attendance: 41,000

Russia: Kharine, Kovtun, Nikiforov, Tsymbalar (Radchenko, 62), Khlestov, Karpin (Shalimov, 75), Onopko (captain), Kulkov, Mostovoi, Yuran (Kiriakov, 46), Kolyvanov.

- November 15, 1995 / UEFA Euro 1996 qualifier / Russia - Finland 3-1 (Radchenko 37' Kulkov 55' Kiriakov 74' - Suominen 45') / Moscow, Luzhniki Stadium / Attendance: 5,000

Russia: Cherchesov, Mamedov (Dobrovolski, 46), Nikiforov, Tsymbalar, Khlestov, Karpin (Kanchelskis, 77), Onopko (captain), Kulkov, Mostovoi, Yuran, Radchenko (Kiriakov, 63).
