= 1996 Russian Top League =

5th season of top-tier football league in Russia

Russian Top League
- Season: 1996

In 1996 the Russian Top League was extended to 18 clubs. The following is a summary of 1996 teams and people.

== Overview ==
Team	Head coach
FC Spartak Moscow	Georgi Yartsev
FC Alania Vladikavkaz	Valery Gazzaev
FC Rotor Volgograd	(Ukraine) Viktor Prokopenko
FC Dynamo Moscow	Adamas Golodets
PFC CSKA Moscow	Aleksandr Tarkhanov
FC Lokomotiv Moscow	Yuri Syomin
FC Baltika Kaliningrad	Leonid Tkachenko
FC Lokomotiv Nizhny Novgorod	Valeri Ovchinnikov
FC Krylia Sovetov Samara	Aleksandr Averyanov
FC Zenit St. Petersburg	Pavel Sadyrin
FC Rostselmash Rostov-on-Don	Sergey Andreyev
FC Torpedo-Luzhniki Moscow	Valentin Ivanov
FC Chernomorets Novorossiysk	Oleg Dolmatov
FC KAMAZ-Chally Naberezhnye Chelny	Valeri Chetverik (until August); Ivan Butaliy (caretaker, from August)
FC Zhemchuzhina Sochi	Arsen Naydyonov
FC Uralmash Yekaterinburg	Valeri Voytenko (until April); Vitaliy Shevchenko (from May)
FC Energiya-Tekstilshchik Kamyshin	Sergei Pavlov
FC Lada Togliatti	Viktor Tishchenko

== Standings ==
Pos	Team	Pld	W	D	L	GF	GA	GD	Pts	Qualification or relegation
1	Spartak Moscow (C)	34	21	9	4	70	34	+36	72	Qualification to Champions League second qualifying round (Note: The title was decided in a championship playoff as Spartak Moscow and Alania Vladikavkaz finished with equal points.)
2	Alania Vladikavkaz (Note: FC Spartak-Alania Vladikavkaz renamed to FC Alania)	34	22	6	6	64	35	+29	72	Qualification to UEFA Cup second qualifying round
3	Rotor Volgograd	34	21	7	6	58	27	+31	70	Qualification to UEFA Cup second qualifying round
4	Dynamo Moscow	34	20	7	7	60	35	+25	67	Qualification to Intertoto Cup group stage
5	CSKA Moscow	34	20	6	8	58	35	+23	66	
6	Lokomotiv Moscow	34	15	10	9	46	31	+15	55	Qualification to Cup Winners' Cup first round
7	Baltika Kaliningrad	34	12	10	12	44	35	+9	46	
8	Lokomotiv N.N.	34	13	6	15	39	50	−11	45	Qualification to Intertoto Cup group stage
9	Krylia Sovetov Samara	34	12	9	13	31	38	−7	45	
10	Zenit St. Petersburg	34	13	4	17	32	37	−5	43	
11	Rostselmash	34	11	8	15	58	60	−2	41	
12	Torpedo-Luzhniki Moscow (Note: FC Torpedo Moscow renamed to FC Torpedo-Luzhniki)	34	10	11	13	42	51	−9	41	Qualification to Intertoto Cup group stage
13	Chernomorets Novorossiysk	34	11	6	17	38	51	−13	39	
14	KAMAZ-Chally Naberezhnye Chelny	34	10	6	18	43	57	−14	36	
15	Zhemchuzhina Sochi	34	10	6	18	38	57	−19	36	
16	Uralmash Yekaterinburg (R)	34	8	9	17	38	57	−19	33	Relegation to First League
17	Energiya-Tekstilshchik Kamyshin (Note: FC Tekstilshchik Kamyshin renamed to FC Energiya-Tekstilshchik) (R)	34	4	12	18	25	48	−23	24	Relegation to First League
18	Lada-Togliatti (R)	34	4	6	24	18	64	−46	18	Relegation to First League

Source: rsssf.com
Rules for classification: 1) points; 2) goal difference; 3) number of goals scored.
(C) Champions; (R) Relegated

=== Championship play-off ===
16 November 1996

Spartak Moscow	2–1	Alania Vladikavkaz
Tsymbalar 6'; Tikhonov 84'	Report	Kanishchev 88'

Petrovsky Stadium, Saint Petersburg
Attendance: 24,000
Referee: Taras Bezubyak

== Results ==
Home \ Away	ALA	BAL	CHE	CSK	DYN	ETK	KAM	KRY	LAD	LOK	LNN	ROS	ROT	SPA	TOR	URA	ZEN	ZHE
Alania Vladikavkaz		4–0	2–1	0–1	4–2	2–1	3–0	1–0	3–0	1–0	3–1	3–2	3–2	2–2	4–1	3–0	3–1	3–1
Baltika Kaliningrad	2–0		2–2	2–1	0–0	4–1	0–0	5–0	2–0	0–1	1–3	0–0	0–1	1–0	2–2	2–0	2–0	2–0
Chernomorets Novorossiysk	1–2	1–0		2–1	1–2	1–0	4–1	0–1	4–1	1–1	3–0	2–1	0–0	0–3	0–1	2–2	0–2	3–1
CSKA Moscow	2–0	0–0	1–3		1–1	2–2	4–2	1–2	3–1	1–3	2–0	4–2	1–0	0–0	2–0	1–1	1–0	3–0
Dynamo Moscow	1–1	3–1	1–1	2–3		2–0	1–0	2–1	4–0	4–2	4–1	2–2	0–1	2–1	1–0	2–0	1–0	2–1
Energiya-Tekstilshchik Kamyshin	0–2	0–2	0–1	1–2	0–0		2–2	2–1	1–0	0–0	2–1	1–1	1–4	1–1	1–1	0–0	2–0	0–1
KAMAZ Naberezhnye Chelny	0–1	0–0	5–0	0–2	3–2	1–0		0–0	2–0	0–0	3–1	2–7	0–0	1–2	2–1	2–1	3–1	4–0
Krylia Sovetov Samara	1–1	3–1	1–0	1–0	0–2	1–0	2–0		3–1	1–0	2–1	0–2	0–3	1–1	3–0	1–1	1–0	0–3
Lada-Togliatti	0–3	0–5	1–1	0–2	0–1	1–1	1–0	0–0		1–0	1–2	0–2	1–4	1–1	0–2	3–2	1–0	0–3
Lokomotiv Moscow	0–0	3–1	3–1	1–2	0–0	1–0	2–0	1–1	0–0		0–0	2–1	2–0	0–2	2–1	5–1	3–1	2–1
Lokomotiv N.N.	1–2	1–0	2–0	1–3	2–0	3–1	2–1	1–0	1–0	0–0		2–3	0–0	1–1	1–0	2–2	2–1	4–1
Rostselmash	1–2	0–1	4–0	0–5	1–2	2–1	4–5	1–0	2–1	0–2	2–3		0–2	2–4	2–2	2–1	2–0	1–1
Rotor Volgograd	3–0	1–0	3–1	2–0	0–1	0–0	3–1	1–1	2–0	2–1	2–0	4–2		4–3	2–2	2–1	1–0	4–1
Spartak Moscow	4–1	0–0	1–0	3–1	3–1	4–2	3–1	2–0	1–0	3–2	4–0	1–1	2–0		2–2	3–0	0–2	2–0
Torpedo-Luzhniki Moscow	2–2	2–2	0–2	2–3	2–5	2–1	2–1	1–0	3–1	1–2	0–0	0–0	1–0	3–4		1–1	2–1	1–0
Uralmash Yekaterinburg	1–3	2–1	4–0	0–1	1–4	0–0	1–0	1–1	0–0	2–1	3–0	2–1	2–4	0–2	1–0		1–3	2–1
Zenit St. Petersburg	1–0	2–2	1–0	1–1	1–0	2–0	2–1	1–0	2–1	1–1	2–0	0–2	0–1	1–2	0–0	1–0		2–0
Zhemchuzhina Sochi	0–0	2–1	1–0	0–1	1–3	1–1	3–0	2–2	2–1	1–3	1–0	3–3	0–0	1–3	1–2	3–2	1–0	

Legend: Blue = home team win; Yellow = draw; Red = away team win.

== Season statistics ==
=== Top goalscorers ===
As of matches played on 3 November 1996.

Rank	Player	Club	Goals
1	(Russia) Aleksandr Maslov	Rostselmash	23
2	(Russia) Oleg Veretennikov	Rotor	19
3	(Russia) Dmitri Cheryshev	Dynamo	17
4	(Kazakhstan) (Russia) Vladimir Niederhaus	Rotor	16
4	(Russia) Andrey Tikhonov	Spartak Moscow	16
6	(Russia) Valery Kechinov	Spartak Moscow	13
6	(Russia) Oleg Teryokhin	Dynamo	13
8	(Russia) Sergei Bulatov	Baltika	12
8	(Russia) Andrey Kobelev	Dynamo	12
10	(Uzbekistan) (Russia) Mirjalol Qosimov	Alania	11
10	(Tajikistan) (Russia) Mukhsin Mukhamadiev	Lokomotiv N.N.	11
10	(Azerbaijan) Nazim Suleymanov	Alania	11
10	(Russia) Bakhva Tedeyev	Alania	11

== Medal squads ==
1. FC Spartak Moscow

Goalkeepers: Aleksandr Filimonov (26), Ruslan Nigmatullin (10).
Defenders: Sergei Gorlukovich (31 / 2), Dmitri Ananko (30 / 1), Vadim Evseev (27 / 2), Aleksandr Lipko (24), Vladislav Duyun (18 / 1), Yuriy Nikiforov (14 / 5), Ramiz Mamedov (14), Konstantin Golovskoy (9), Sergei Chudin (6).
Midfielders: Andrey Tikhonov (34 / 16), Dmitri Alenichev (32 / 7), Yegor Titov (31 / 5), Valery Kechinov (30 / 13), Aleksei Melyoshin (24 / 2), Ilya Tsymbalar (21 / 9), Andrei Piatnitski (13), Andrei Konovalov (11), Artyom Bezrodny (10), Aleksandr Pavlenko (2), Yevgeni Toloknov (1).
Forwards: Vladimir Dzhubanov (25 / 3), Aleksandr Shirko (22 / 5), Valeri Shmarov (3), Konstantin Kovalenko (Belarus) (2 / 1), Serhiy Nahornyak (Ukraine) (2).
(league appearances and goals listed in brackets)

Manager: Georgi Yartsev.

Transferred out during the season: Yuriy Nikiforov (to (Spain) Sporting Gijón), Valeri Shmarov (to (South Korea) Chunnam Dragons), Serhiy Nahornyak (Ukraine) (to (Ukraine) FC Dnipro Dnipropetrovsk).

2. FC Alania Vladikavkaz

Goalkeepers: Dmitriy Kramarenko (Azerbaijan) (22), Zaur Khapov (16).
Defenders: Omari Tetradze (31 / 1), Artur Pagayev (30 / 1), Alan Agayev (29 / 3), Inal Dzhioyev (29 / 1), Murtaz Shelia (Georgia (country)) (27 / 5), Oleg Kornienko (Kazakhstan) (22), Aslan Datdeyev (11 / 1).
Midfielders: Igor Yanovskiy (34 / 5), Bakhva Tedeyev (28 / 11), Sergey Timofeev (Kazakhstan) (25), Zaza Revishvili (Georgia (country)) (19 / 1), Mirjalol Qosimov (Uzbekistan) (17 / 11), Georgi Botsiyev (16), Robert Bitarov (13 / 1), Sergei Derkach (12 / 1), Gocha Jamarauli (Georgia (country)) (9), Vitaliy Skysh (Ukraine) (6).
Forwards: Anatoli Kanishchev (33 / 7), Nazim Suleymanov (Azerbaijan) (25 / 11), Oleg Sergeyev (13 / 2), Tamerlan Sikoyev (8 / 1), Valeri Klimov (6 / 1).

One own goal scored by Albert Oskolkov (FC Lokomotiv Nizhny Novgorod).

Manager: Valery Gazzaev.

Transferred out during the season: Gocha Jamarauli (Georgia (country)) (to (Georgia (country)) FC Dinamo Tbilisi), Valeri Klimov (to FC Arsenal Tula).

3. FC Rotor Volgograd

Goalkeepers: Andrei Samorukov (34).
Defenders: Albert Borzenkov (33), Valeri Burlachenko (28 / 1), Aleksandr Shmarko (28 / 1), Volodymyr Gerashchenko (Ukraine) (21), Sergei Zhunenko (Kazakhstan) (16), Ihor Zhabchenko (Ukraine) (3), Aleksandr Yeshchenko (1), Sergei Khramtsov (1).
Midfielders: Oleg Veretennikov (33 / 19), Aleksandr Berketov (33 / 5), Valery Yesipov (33 / 1), Ihor Korniyets (Ukraine) (33), Maksim Tishchenko (31 / 4), Hennadiy Orbu (Ukraine) (20 / 2), Vitaliy Abramov (Kazakhstan) (11 / 1), Aleksandr Tsarenko (7), Andrei Krivov (6 / 1), Ilya Borodin (3 / 1), Emil Tsatskin (3).
Forwards: Vladimir Niederhaus (Kazakhstan) (31 / 16), Aleksandr Zernov (30 / 3), Sergei Ilyushin (18 / 2), Mikhail Potylchak (3).

One own goal scored by Sergei Makeyev (FC Krylia Sovetov Samara).

Manager: Viktor Prokopenko (Ukraine) .

Transferred out during the season: Aleksandr Tsarenko (to FC Tekstilshchik Kamyshin), Emil Tsatskin (to FC Rostselmash Rostov-on-Don), Mikhail Potylchak (to FC Torpedo Volzhsky), Aleksandr Yeshchenko (to FC Zhemchuzhina Sochi).

== Attendances ==
#	Club	Average Attendance	Change
1	Alania	27,547	-17,7%
2	Baltika	17,294	2,4%
3	Rotor	16,676	-3,4%
4	Zenit	15,382	106,7%
5	Krylia Sovetov	11,588	72,1%
6	Novorossiysk	10,853	11,1%
7	KAMAZ	10,353	-17,0%
8	Nizhny Novgorod	9,765	53,4%
9	Spartak Moscow	9,506	-23,8%
10	Rostselmash	7,859	-8,6%
11	Torpedo	7,388	218,4%
12	Tekstilshchik	6,753	-33,9%
13	Uralmash	5,935	-38,0%
14	PFC CSKA	5,624	-2,4%
15	Zhemchuzhina	3,900	72,0%
16	Lada	3,653	54,1%
17	Dynamo Moscow	3,476	-6,4%
18	Lokomotiv Moscow	3,088	-7,7%

== See also ==
- 1996 Russian First League
- 1996 Russian Second League
- 1996 Russian Third League
