= 1997 Russian Top League =

6th season of top-tier football league in Russia

Russian Top League
- Season: 1997

In the 1997 season of the Russian Top League, the football team Spartak Moscow successfully defended the championship, winning their fifth Russian title.

== Overview ==
Team	Head coach
FC Spartak Moscow	Oleg Romantsev
FC Rotor Volgograd	(Ukraine) Viktor Prokopenko
FC Dynamo Moscow	Adamas Golodets
FC Shinnik Yaroslavl	Anatoli Polosin (until August); Pyotr Shubin (from August)
FC Lokomotiv Moscow	Yuri Syomin
FC Chernomorets Novorossiysk	Oleg Dolmatov
FC Krylia Sovetov Samara	Aleksandr Averyanov
FC Zenit St. Petersburg	(Ukraine) Anatoliy Byshovets
FC Baltika Kaliningrad	Leonid Tkachenko
FC Alania Vladikavkaz	Valery Gazzaev
FC Torpedo-Luzhniki Moscow	Aleksandr Tarkhanov
PFC CSKA Moscow	Pavel Sadyrin
FC Rostselmash Rostov-on-Don	Sergey Andreyev
FC Zhemchuzhina Sochi	Arsen Naydyonov
FC Tyumen	Aleksandr Irkhin (until April); Aleksandr Ignatenko (from April)
FC Fakel Voronezh	Sergei Savchenkov
FC Lokomotiv Nizhny Novgorod	Valeri Ovchinnikov
FC KAMAZ-Chally Naberezhnye Chelny	(Lithuania) Benjaminas Zelkevičius

== Standings ==
Pos	Team	Pld	W	D	L	GF	GA	GD	Pts	Qualification or relegation
1	Spartak Moscow (C)	34	22	7	5	67	30	+37	73	Qualification to Champions League second qualifying round
2	Rotor Volgograd	34	20	8	6	54	27	+27	68	Qualification to UEFA Cup second qualifying round
3	Dynamo Moscow	34	19	11	4	50	20	+30	68	Qualification to UEFA Cup second qualifying round
4	Shinnik Yaroslavl	34	15	10	9	38	35	+3	55	Qualification to Intertoto Cup second round
5	Lokomotiv Moscow	34	15	9	10	47	37	+10	54	Qualification to Cup Winners' Cup first round
6	Chernomorets Novorossiysk	34	13	14	7	40	26	+14	53	
7	Krylia Sovetov Samara	34	14	7	13	32	30	+2	49	
8	Zenit St. Petersburg	34	13	10	11	28	29	−1	49	
9	Baltika Kaliningrad	34	11	16	7	38	33	+5	49	Qualification to Intertoto Cup first round
10	Alania Vladikavkaz	34	14	4	16	52	42	+10	46	
11	Torpedo Moscow	34	13	6	15	50	46	+4	45	
12	CSKA Moscow	34	11	9	14	31	42	−11	42	
13	Rostselmash	34	9	14	11	34	38	−4	41	
14	Zhemchuzhina Sochi	34	11	7	16	38	51	−13	40	
15	Tyumen	34	9	7	18	28	46	−18	34	
16	Fakel Voronezh (R)	34	7	5	22	25	49	−24	26	Relegation to First Division
17	Lokomotiv N.N. (R)	34	6	5	23	26	60	−34	23	Relegation to First Division
18	KAMAZ Naberezhnye Chelny (Note: KAMAZ-Chally were docked 6 points for failing to pay a transfer fee.) (R)	34	8	3	23	38	75	−37	21	Relegation to First Division

Source: rsssf.com
Rules for classification: 1) points; 2) goal difference; 3) number of goals scored.
(C) Champions; (R) Relegated

== Results ==
Home \ Away	ALA	BAL	CHE	CSK	DYN	FAK	KAM	KRY	LOK	LNN	ROS	ROT	SHI	SPA	TOR	TYU	ZEN	ZHE
Alania Vladikavkaz		0–0	1–3	3–0	0–1	2–0	5–0	1–1	1–2	3–1	0–0	3–2	5–2	2–0	2–1	0–0	0–2	4–1
Baltika Kaliningrad	1–2		1–1	1–1	0–2	1–0	4–1	2–0	0–0	1–0	0–0	0–1	1–1	1–1	1–0	2–0	2–2	2–1
Chernomorets Novorossiysk	1–2	2–2		0–1	1–1	3–0	1–0	3–0	1–1	3–0	0–0	2–1	1–0	1–0	2–1	4–0	2–0	2–2
CSKA Moscow	2–1	1–1	0–1		1–1	1–0	1–0	1–2	1–2	3–0	2–0	0–2	0–0	0–0	0–5	0–3	2–0	1–1
Dynamo Moscow	1–0	1–1	0–0	2–0		4–1	6–1	0–1	3–1	3–0	1–0	0–0	3–0	1–1	1–1	2–0	0–0	1–0
Fakel Voronezh	2–1	0–2	0–0	1–1	0–1		4–0	2–2	1–0	2–0	0–0	0–0	1–2	0–1	2–3	1–0	0–1	2–1
KAMAZ Naberezhnye Chelny	4–2	3–3	0–0	0–3	1–3	3–0		3–0	0–2	1–1	3–2	0–5	3–0	2–1	1–3	2–1	0–1	2–3
Krylia Sovetov Samara	1–3	0–0	1–0	1–0	0–1	1–0	4–0		1–0	4–0	3–0	1–2	0–0	1–2	0–1	1–0	1–0	0–1
Lokomotiv Moscow	1–0	1–1	2–1	1–3	2–1	2–0	2–0	2–1		1–1	2–1	0–1	1–1	1–3	3–0	3–1	0–0	4–1
Lokomotiv N.N.	1–3	1–4	2–3	3–1	0–1	1–0	2–1	0–1	1–3		0–1	1–2	0–1	2–3	1–0	1–0	2–2	1–0
Rostselmash	1–0	0–0	0–0	1–1	1–3	2–0	2–1	1–1	2–2	3–1		1–1	1–2	3–5	1–1	3–1	2–3	0–0
Rotor Volgograd	1–0	2–1	1–1	1–0	3–1	2–0	3–1	1–1	1–0	2–0	0–2		1–0	0–2	1–2	5–2	3–0	3–1
Shinnik Yaroslavl	3–0	4–0	1–0	0–1	0–0	2–1	1–0	1–0	2–1	0–0	1–1	1–1		1–1	1–3	1–0	2–0	2–1
Spartak Moscow	2–1	4–1	3–0	0–0	1–2	4–2	6–2	2–0	4–2	1–0	2–0	3–2	3–0		0–1	2–0	2–0	2–0
Torpedo Moscow	2–1	1–0	0–0	3–0	0–1	4–2	2–0	0–1	1–3	2–2	0–1	1–1	1–2	0–3		1–1	1–2	3–1
Tyumen	1–4	0–1	0–0	2–0	1–0	1–0	1–0	1–0	0–0	2–1	0–1	0–0	1–2	2–2	2–1		0–1	2–2
Zenit St. Petersburg	1–0	0–1	0–0	2–0	0–0	0–1	0–3	0–0	2–0	1–0	0–0	0–1	1–1	0–0	3–2	2–0		2–0
Zhemchuzhina Sochi	1–0	0–0	3–1	2–3	2–2	1–0	1–0	0–1	0–0	2–0	2–1	0–2	2–1	0–1	4–3	1–3	1–0	

Legend: Blue = home team win; Yellow = draw; Red = away team win.

== Season statistics ==
=== Top goalscorers ===
As of matches played on 9 November 1997.

Rank	Player	Club	Goals
1	(Russia) Oleg Veretennikov	Rotor	22
2	(Russia) Oleg Teryokhin	Dynamo	17
3	(Russia) Igor Yanovskiy	Alania	13
4	(Russia) Lev Berezner	Chernomorets	11
4	(Russia) Aleksandr Zernov	Rotor	11
4	(Russia) Valery Kechinov	Spartak Moscow	11
7	(Russia) Andrey Tikhonov	Spartak Moscow	10
7	(Lithuania) Edgaras Jankauskas	Torpedo-Luzhniki	10
9	(Russia) Aleksandr Gerasimov	Shinnik	9
9	(Russia) Aleksei Kosolapov	Lokomotiv Moscow	9
9	(Russia) Vladimir Kulik	CSKA	9
9	(Russia) Dmitry Khokhlov	Torpedo-Luzhniki	9

== Medal squads ==
1. FC Spartak Moscow

Goalkeepers: Aleksandr Filimonov (33), Ruslan Nigmatullin (2).
Defenders: Sergei Gorlukovich (31 / 2), Dmitri Khlestov (27 / 1), Dmitri Ananko (25), Miroslav Romaschenko (Belarus) (24 / 4), Ramiz Mamedov (19 / 1), Vadim Evseev (18), Konstantin Golovskoy (14), Vasili Kulkov (6).
Midfielders: Dmitri Alenichev (33 / 2), Yegor Titov (31 / 8), Aleksei Bakharev (30 / 2), Aleksei Melyoshin (26 / 2), Andrey Tikhonov (24 / 10), Valery Kechinov (22 / 11), Ilya Tsymbalar (11 / 4), Andrei Konovalov (11 / 1), Robert Yevdokimov (4 / 1).
Forwards: Aleksandr Shirko (26 / 7), Maksim Buznikin (20 / 8), Luis Robson (Brazil) (10 / 1), Sergey Dmitriev (6 / 1), Sergei Lutovinov (6).
(league appearances and goals listed in brackets)

One own goal scored by Vladimir Klontsak (FC KAMAZ-Chally Naberezhnye Chelny).

Manager: Oleg Romantsev.

Transferred out during the season: Vasili Kulkov (to FC Zenit St. Petersburg), Robert Yevdokimov (to FC KAMAZ-Chally Naberezhnye Chelny).

2. FC Rotor Volgograd

Goalkeepers: Platon Zakharchuk (34).
Defenders: Aleksandr Shmarko (33), Volodymyr Gerashchenko (Ukraine) (27), Sergei Zhunenko (Kazakhstan) (23), Valeri Burlachenko (22 / 1), Nikolai Olenikov (19), Albert Borzenkov (15).
Midfielders: Oleg Veretennikov (34 / 22), Aleksandr Berketov (33 / 3), Valery Yesipov (32 / 3), Vitaliy Abramov (Kazakhstan) (30 / 1), Andrei Krivov (25), Maksim Tishchenko (20), Ihor Korniyets (Ukraine) (12), Vladimir Smirnov (4), Mikhail Mysin (1), Hennadiy Orbu (Ukraine) (1).
Forwards: Denis Zubko (34 / 4), Vladimir Niederhaus (Kazakhstan) (33 / 8), Aleksandr Zernov (31 / 11), Sergei Ilyushin (1).

One own goal scored by Denis Koberskiy (FC Zhemchuzhina Sochi).

Manager: Viktor Prokopenko (Ukraine) .

Transferred out during the season: Ihor Korniyets (Ukraine) , Sergei Ilyushin (both to FC Arsenal Tula), Hennadiy Orbu (Ukraine) (to (Ukraine) FC Shakhtar Donetsk).

3. FC Dynamo Moscow

Goalkeepers: Dmytro Tyapushkin (Ukraine) (23), Andrei Smetanin (14).
Defenders: Sergei Shtanyuk (Belarus) (33 / 2), Andrei Ostrovskiy (Belarus) (32 / 4), Yuri Kovtun (28), Erik Yakhimovich (Belarus) (16), Mikhail Zharinov (9), Yevgeni Korablyov (9), Vyacheslav Tsaryov (4), Maksim Povorov (1).
Midfielders: Andrey Kobelev (33 / 7), Vladimir Skokov (32 / 5), Sergei Nekrasov (32 / 1), Sergey Grishin (28 / 1), Aliaksandr Kulchiy (Belarus) (26 / 3), Aleksandr Tochilin (23), Andrei Gordeyev (7 / 1), Rolan Gusev (7), Vitali Kulyov (6), Maksim Romaschenko (Belarus) (4 / 4), Yuri Kuznetsov (4).
Forwards: Oleg Teryokhin (33 / 17), Aleksei Kutsenko (19 / 4), Eduard Kosolapov (8 / 1), Yuri Tishkov (4), Sergei Artyomov (2), Andrei Dyomkin (1), Oleg Sergeyev (1).

Manager: Adamas Golodets.

Transferred out during the season: Erik Yakhimovich (Belarus) (on loan to (Turkey) Vanspor), Andrei Dyomkin (to (Belgium) R.S.C. Anderlecht).

== Attendances ==
Rank	Club	Average
1	Alania	27,176
2	Rotor	20,529
3	Krylia Sovetov	18,294
4	Fakel	17,253
5	Baltika	17,059
6	Spartak Moscow	11,941
7	Novorossiysk	11,882
8	Shinnik	10,741
9	Rostov	10,653
10	Zenit	10,471
11	KAMAZ	7,618
12	Nizhny Novgorod	6,312
13	Dynamo Moscow	6,000
14	PFC CSKA	5,176
15	Zhemchuzhina	5,118
16	Tyumen	4,029
17	Torpedo Moscow	3,606
18	Lokomotiv Moscow	3,118

== See also ==
- 1997 in Russian football
