= 1995 Russian Top League =

4th season of top-tier football league in Russia

Russian Top League
- Season: 1995

Statistics of Russian Top League in season 1995.

== Overview ==
16 teams participated, and Spartak-Alania Vladikavkaz won the championship.

Team	Head coach
FC Spartak-Alania Vladikavkaz	Valery Gazzaev
FC Lokomotiv Moscow	Yuri Syomin
FC Spartak Moscow	Oleg Romantsev
FC Dynamo Moscow	Konstantin Beskov (until August); Adamas Golodets (from September)
FC Torpedo Moscow	Valentin Ivanov
PFC CSKA Moscow	Aleksandr Tarkhanov
FC Rotor Volgograd	Viktor Prokopenko
FC Uralmash Yekaterinburg	Vladimir Kalashnikov
FC KAMAZ-Chally Naberezhnye Chelny	Valeri Chetverik
FC Tekstilshchik Kamyshin	Sergei Pavlov
FC Chernomorets Novorossiysk	Oleg Dolmatov (until September); Sergei Butenko (caretaker, from September)
FC Lokomotiv Nizhny Novgorod	Valeri Ovchinnikov
FC Zhemchuzhina Sochi	Arsen Naydyonov
FC Rostselmash Rostov-on-Don	Enver Yulgushov (until May); Sergey Andreyev (from May)
FC Krylia Sovetov Samara	Aleksandr Averyanov
FC Dynamo-Gazovik Tyumen	Aleksandr Bubnov (until March); Sergei Rozhkov (March to April); Aleksandr Irkhin (April to July); Eduard Malofeyev (from August)

== League standings ==
Pos	Team	Pld	W	D	L	GF	GA	GD	Pts	Qualification or relegation
1	Spartak-Alania Vladikavkaz (C)	30	22	5	3	63	21	+42	71	Qualification to Champions League qualifying round
2	Lokomotiv Moscow	30	20	5	5	52	23	+29	65	Qualification to Cup Winners' Cup first round
3	Spartak Moscow	30	19	6	5	76	26	+50	63	Qualification to UEFA Cup qualifying round
4	Dynamo Moscow	30	16	8	6	45	29	+16	56	Qualification to UEFA Cup qualifying round
5	Torpedo Moscow	30	16	7	7	40	30	+10	55	Qualification to UEFA Cup qualifying round
6	CSKA Moscow	30	16	5	9	56	34	+22	53	Qualification to UEFA Cup qualifying round
7	Rotor Volgograd	30	11	7	12	62	49	+13	40	Qualification to Intertoto Cup group stage
8	Uralmash Yekaterinburg	30	12	3	15	43	47	−4	39	Qualification to Intertoto Cup group stage
9	KAMAZ Naberezhnye Chelny	30	10	8	12	34	30	+4	38	Qualification to Intertoto Cup group stage
10	Tekstilshchik Kamyshin	30	9	7	14	37	41	−4	34	
11	Chernomorets Novorossiysk	30	10	2	18	32	62	−30	32	
12	Lokomotiv N.N.	30	6	11	13	28	42	−14	29	
13	Rostselmash	30	8	4	18	35	56	−21	28	
14	Zhemchuzhina Sochi	30	8	4	18	36	69	−33	28	
15	Krylia Sovetov Samara	30	6	8	16	34	65	−31	26	
16	Dynamo-Gazovik Tyumen (R)	30	3	6	21	28	77	−49	15	Relegation to First League

Source: rsssf.com
Rules for classification: 1) points; 2) goal difference; 3) number of goals scored.
(C) Champions; (R) Relegated

== Results ==
Home \ Away	SAL	CHE	CSK	DYN	DGT	KAM	KRY	LOK	LNN	ROS	ROT	SPA	TEK	TOR	URA	ZHE
Spartak-Alania Vladikavkaz		3–0	2–1	2–0	4–0	0–0	1–1	0–1	3–0	4–1	3–2	1–1	2–0	0–0	4–2	5–0
Chernomorets Novorossiysk	0–3		1–3	0–1	2–0	2–1	2–0	2–4	2–3	2–1	2–1	1–1	2–2	0–1	3–2	4–0
CSKA Moscow	1–2	4–0		1–3	3–1	2–2	4–1	0–1	4–0	4–0	1–4	1–2	2–2	2–1	2–0	4–0
Dynamo Moscow	1–2	2–0	0–1		1–0	1–0	4–1	2–1	2–0	1–1	1–0	0–2	0–0	0–0	3–0	4–3
Dynamo-Gazovik Tyumen	0–4	1–2	2–0	2–2		0–0	3–2	2–3	0–0	2–0	1–6	0–6	0–3	1–3	0–2	1–2
KAMAZ Naberezhnye Chelny	1–0	2–0	0–0	5–2	1–1		1–0	0–2	1–1	0–1	2–0	2–0	2–1	3–1	4–0	3–0
Krylia Sovetov Samara	0–1	1–0	1–2	1–4	6–3	2–1		0–4	1–1	2–6	3–3	1–6	0–3	0–2	3–2	0–0
Lokomotiv Moscow	4–1	5–0	0–1	1–1	1–1	1–0	2–1		1–0	2–1	4–3	1–0	2–0	0–0	0–1	1–1
Lokomotiv N.N.	2–4	0–1	0–0	1–1	0–0	0–0	1–0	0–2		2–1	1–1	0–1	4–1	2–3	3–1	2–2
Rostselmash	0–1	0–2	1–3	2–2	3–0	2–0	2–2	0–2	2–1		0–4	1–1	2–1	1–2	2–0	1–4
Rotor Volgograd	1–1	5–1	2–2	0–2	5–4	2–0	0–0	2–1	1–1	4–1		1–1	3–1	1–2	1–2	7–0
Spartak Moscow	1–2	5–0	3–1	2–0	4–1	2–0	5–1	1–2	3–1	2–0	1–2		4–2	5–0	5–1	6–0
Tekstilshchik Kamyshin	0–1	2–0	1–2	1–2	3–1	1–0	1–2	1–1	1–2	2–0	1–0	2–2		1–1	0–1	2–1
Torpedo Moscow	1–4	1–0	1–2	0–0	2–1	2–1	0–0	1–0	2–0	1–0	3–0	1–2	0–0		3–0	3–0
Uralmash Yekaterinburg	0–1	6–0	1–0	0–2	5–0	0–0	0–0	1–2	1–0	2–0	5–0	0–0	2–0	1–2		4–3
Zhemchuzhina Sochi	0–2	2–1	0–3	0–1	2–0	4–2	1–2	0–1	0–0	1–3	2–1	1–2	0–2	3–1	4–1	

Legend: Blue = home team win; Yellow = draw; Red = away team win.

== Season statistics ==
=== Top goalscorers ===
As of matches played on 26 October 1995.

Rank	Player	Club	Goals
1	(Russia) Oleg Veretennikov	Rotor	25
2	(Russia) Aleksandr Maslov	Rostselmash	18
3	(Russia) Valeri Shmarov	Spartak Moscow	16
4	(Kazakhstan) (Russia) Vladimir Niederhaus	Rotor	14
5	(Russia) Oleg Garin	Lokomotiv Moscow	13
6	(Georgia (country)) Mikhail Kavelashvili	Spartak-Alania	12
7	(Russia) Yevgeni Kharlachyov	Lokomotiv Moscow	11
7	(Russia) Oleg Teryokhin	Dynamo Moscow	11
9	(Armenia) Garnik Avalyan	Krylia Sovetov	10
9	(Russia) Timur Bogatyryov	Zhemchuzhina	10
9	(Russia) Dmitri Karsakov	CSKA	10
9	(Russia) Sergei Natalushko	Tekstilshchik	10
9	(Uzbekistan) Mirjalol Qosimov	Spartak-Alania	10
9	(Russia) Bakhva Tedeyev	Spartak-Alania	10

== Medal squads ==
1. FC Spartak-Alania Vladikavkaz

Goalkeepers: Zaur Khapov (29), Dmitriy Kramarenko (21) (Azerbaijan) , Soso Grishikashvili (Georgia (country)) (3).
Defenders: Omari Tetradze (30), Artur Pagayev (28 / 2), Sergey Timofeev (Kazakhstan) (24 / 2), Murtaz Shelia (Georgia (country)) (22 / 4), Inal Dzhioyev (22 / 2), Oleg Kornienko (Kazakhstan) (19), Aslan Datdeyev (18 / 1), Igor Gorelov (9), Alan Agayev (7 / 1), Ali Alchagirov (7), Sergei Gorlukovich (5).
Midfielders: Igor Yanovskiy (29 / 2), Bakhva Tedeyev (28 / 10), Sergei Derkach (26 / 5), Mirjalol Qosimov (Uzbekistan) (22 / 10), Georgi Botsiyev (9), Shamil Isayev (1), Zaza Revishvili (Georgia (country)) (1).
Forwards: Anatoli Kanishchev (26 / 7), Mikhail Kavelashvili (Georgia (country)) (24 / 12), Nazim Suleymanov (Azerbaijan) (13 / 4), Tamerlan Sikoyev (3), Aslan Goplachev (2).
(league appearances and goals listed in brackets)

One own goal scored by Stanislav Bondarev (FC Zhemchuzhina Sochi).

Manager: Valery Gazzaev.

Transferred out during the season: Igor Gorelov (to FC Dynamo-Gazovik Tyumen), Aslan Goplachev, Shamil Isayev (both to PFC Spartak Nalchik).

2. FC Lokomotiv Moscow

Goalkeepers: Sergei Ovchinnikov (27), Khasanbi Bidzhiyev (3).
Defenders: Igor Chugainov (30 / 1), Andrei Solomatin (27 / 4), Sargis Hovhannisyan (Armenia) (23 / 2), Aleksei Arifullin (21), Oleg Pashinin (Uzbekistan) (14), Sergei Gurenko (Belarus) (13), Vyacheslav Tsaryov (4).
Midfielders: Yuri Alekseevich Drozdov (30), Alexei Kosolapov (29 / 9), Yevgeni Kharlachyov (26 / 11), Oleg Elyshev (26 / 2), Aleksandr Smirnov (16 / 2), Ansar Ayupov (14 / 1), Vladimir Maminov (Uzbekistan) (11 / 1), Yevgeni Kuznetsov (10 / 1), Yuri Baturenko (Tajikistan) (3), Sergei Zhukov (1).
Forwards: Oleg Garin (28 / 13), Aleksandr Katasonov (13 / 1), Vitaliy Parakhnevych (Tajikistan) (10), Aleksei Snigiryov (9 / 3), Aleksandr Tatarkin (6), Serhiy Perepadenko (Ukraine) (4).

One own goal scored by Andrey Shkurin (Kazakhstan) (FC Chernomorets Novorossiysk).

Manager: Yuri Syomin.

Transferred out during the season: Ansar Ayupov (to (Netherlands) FC Twente), Vitaliy Parakhnevych (Tajikistan) (to (South Korea) Jeonbuk Hyundai Motors).

3. FC Spartak Moscow

Goalkeepers: Ruslan Nigmatullin (15), Dmytro Tyapushkin (Ukraine) (8), Stanislav Cherchesov (8).
Defenders: Ramiz Mamedov (30 / 3), Viktor Onopko (29 / 6), Dmitri Khlestov (26 / 1), Yuriy Nikiforov (22 / 9), Andrei Afanasyev (19 / 1), Andrei Ivanov (9), Sergei Chudin (5), Dmitri Ananko (3).
Midfielders: Dmitri Alenichev (27 / 4), Ilya Tsymbalar (21 / 8), Valery Kechinov (21 / 4), Andrey Tikhonov (20 / 7), Nikolai Pisarev (14 / 2), Yegor Titov (12 / 1), Vasili Kulkov (12), Andrei Konovalov (11 / 2), Andrei Piatnitski (10).
Forwards: Valeri Shmarov (20 / 16), Mukhsin Mukhamadiev (15 / 7), Serhiy Nahornyak (Ukraine) (10), Sergey Rodionov (9 / 3), Sergei Yuran (8 / 2), Valery Vyalichka (Belarus) (2), Valeri Masalitin (1), Aleksandr Shirko (1).

Manager: Oleg Romantsev.

Transferred out during the season: Nikolai Pisarev (to (Spain) Mérida), Serhiy Nahornyak (Ukraine) (to (Ukraine) FC Dnipro Dnipropetrovsk).

== Attendances ==
#	Club	Average Attendance	Change
1	Alania	33,467	88,0%
2	Rotor	17,267	47,0%
3	KAMAZ	12,467	8,0%
4	Spartak Moscow	12,467	196,1%
5	Tekstilshchik	10,213	44,1%
6	Novorossiysk	9,773	59,9%
7	Uralmash	9,567	45,4%
8	Rostselmash	8,600	101,8%
9	Krylia Sovetov	6,733	-11,4%
10	Nizhny Novgorod	6,367	10,3%
11	PFC CSKA	5,760	100,2%
12	Dynamo Moscow	3,713	28,8%
13	Lokomotiv Moscow	3,347	73,2%
14	Tyumen	3,320	-38,0%
15	Torpedo	2,320	-3,5%
16	Zhemchuzhina	2,267	-45,3%

== See also ==
- 1995 Russian First League
- 1995 Russian Second League
- 1995 Russian Third League
