= Yeshchenko =

Yeshchenko or Eshchenko (Russian: Ещенко) is a gender-neutral Slavic surname. Notable people with the surname include:

- Aleksandr Yeshchenko (born 1970), Russian football player
- Andrey Yeshchenko (born 1984), Russian football player
- Oleg Yeshchenko (born 1995), Russian football player
