= Gavrilovsky =

Gavrilovsky (Russian: Гавриловский; masculine), Gavrilovskaya (Гавриловская; feminine), or Gavrilovskoye (Гавриловское; neuter) is the name of several rural localities in Russia.

== Altai Krai ==
As of 2010, one rural locality in Altai Krai bears this name:

- Gavrilovsky, Altai Krai, a settlement in Nikolayevsky Selsoviet of Pospelikhinsky District

== Arkhangelsk Oblast ==
As of 2010, five rural localities in Arkhangelsk Oblast bear this name:

- Gavrilovskaya, Kargopolsky District, Arkhangelsk Oblast, a village in Pechnikovsky Selsoviet of Kargopolsky District
- Gavrilovskaya, Konoshsky District, Arkhangelsk Oblast, a village in Klimovsky Selsoviet of Konoshsky District
- Gavrilovskaya, Krasnoborsky District, Arkhangelsk Oblast, a village in Lyakhovsky Selsoviet of Krasnoborsky District
- Gavrilovskaya, Limsky Selsoviet, Nyandomsky District, Arkhangelsk Oblast, a village in Limsky Selsoviet of Nyandomsky District
- Gavrilovskaya, Moshinsky Selsoviet, Nyandomsky District, Arkhangelsk Oblast, a village in Moshinsky Selsoviet of Nyandomsky District

== Astrakhan Oblast ==
As of 2010, one rural locality in Astrakhan Oblast bears this name:

- Gavrilovsky, Astrakhan Oblast, a settlement in Chulpansky Selsoviet of Ikryaninsky District

== Republic of Bashkortostan ==
As of 2010, one rural locality in the Republic of Bashkortostan bears this name:

- Gavrilovsky, Republic of Bashkortostan, a khutor in Isimovsky Selsoviet of Kugarchinsky District

== Irkutsk Oblast ==
As of 2010, one rural locality in Irkutsk Oblast bears this name:

- Gavrilovskaya, Irkutsk Oblast, a village in Cheremkhovsky District

== Kirov Oblast ==
As of 2010, one rural locality in Kirov Oblast bears this name:

- Gavrilovskaya, Kirov Oblast, a village in Papulovsky Rural Okrug of Luzsky District

== Kostroma Oblast ==
As of 2010, five rural localities in Kostroma Oblast bear this name:

- Gavrilovskoye, Buysky District, Kostroma Oblast, a village in Tsentralnoye Settlement of Buysky District
- Gavrilovskoye, Chukhlomsky District, Kostroma Oblast, a village in Nozhkinskoye Settlement of Chukhlomsky District
- Gavrilovskoye, Dmitriyevskoye Settlement, Galichsky District, Kostroma Oblast, a selo in Dmitriyevskoye Settlement of Galichsky District
- Gavrilovskoye, Orekhovskoye Settlement, Galichsky District, Kostroma Oblast, a village in Orekhovskoye Settlement of Galichsky District
- Gavrilovskoye, Susaninsky District, Kostroma Oblast, a village under the administrative jurisdiction of Susanino Urban Settlement (urban-type settlement) of Susaninsky District

== Kursk Oblast ==
As of 2010, one rural locality in Kursk Oblast bears this name:

- Gavrilovsky, Kursk Oblast, a settlement in Troyanovsky Selsoviet of Zheleznogorsky District

== Moscow Oblast ==
As of 2010, three rural localities in Moscow Oblast bear this name:

- Gavrilovskoye, Moscow Oblast, a selo in Gazoprovodskoye Rural Settlement of Lukhovitsky District
- Gavrilovskaya, Shatursky District, Moscow Oblast, a village under the administrative jurisdiction of the Town of Shatura in Shatursky District
- Gavrilovskaya, Yegoryevsky District, Moscow Oblast, a village under the administrative jurisdiction of the Town of Yegoryevsk in Yegoryevsky District

== Oryol Oblast ==
As of 2010, two rural localities in Oryol Oblast bear this name:

- Gavrilovskoye, Oryol Oblast, a selo in Gerasimovsky Selsoviet of Shablykinsky District
- Gavrilovskaya, Oryol Oblast, a village in Zhilyayevsky Selsoviet of Orlovsky District

== Ryazan Oblast ==
As of 2010, three rural localities in Ryazan Oblast bear this name:

- Gavrilovskoye, Chuchkovsky District, Ryazan Oblast, a village in Aleyevsky Rural Okrug of Chuchkovsky District
- Gavrilovskoye, Sasovsky District, Ryazan Oblast, a selo in Gavrilovsky Rural Okrug of Sasovsky District
- Gavrilovskoye, Spassky District, Ryazan Oblast, a selo in Gavrilovsky Rural Okrug of Spassky District

== Samara Oblast ==
As of 2010, one rural locality in Samara Oblast bears this name:

- Gavrilovsky, Samara Oblast, a settlement in Alexeyevsky District

== Tver Oblast ==
As of 2010, one rural locality in Tver Oblast bears this name:

- Gavrilovskoye, Tver Oblast, a village in Sandovsky District

== Vladimir Oblast ==
As of 2010, one rural locality in Vladimir Oblast bears this name:

- Gavrilovskoye, Vladimir Oblast, a selo in Suzdalsky District

== Vologda Oblast ==
As of 2010, two rural localities in Vologda Oblast bear this name:

- Gavrilovskaya, Tarnogsky District, Vologda Oblast, a village in Verkhnespassky Selsoviet of Tarnogsky District
- Gavrilovskaya, Vashkinsky District, Vologda Oblast, a village in Andreyevsky Selsoviet of Vashkinsky District

== Yaroslavl Oblast ==
As of 2010, two rural localities in Yaroslavl Oblast bear this name:

- Gavrilovskoye, Rybinsky District, Yaroslavl Oblast, a village in Volzhsky Rural Okrug of Rybinsky District
- Gavrilovskoye, Tutayevsky District, Yaroslavl Oblast, a village in Borisoglebsky Rural Okrug of Tutayevsky District
