= Yuri Kovtun =

Russian footballer and manager

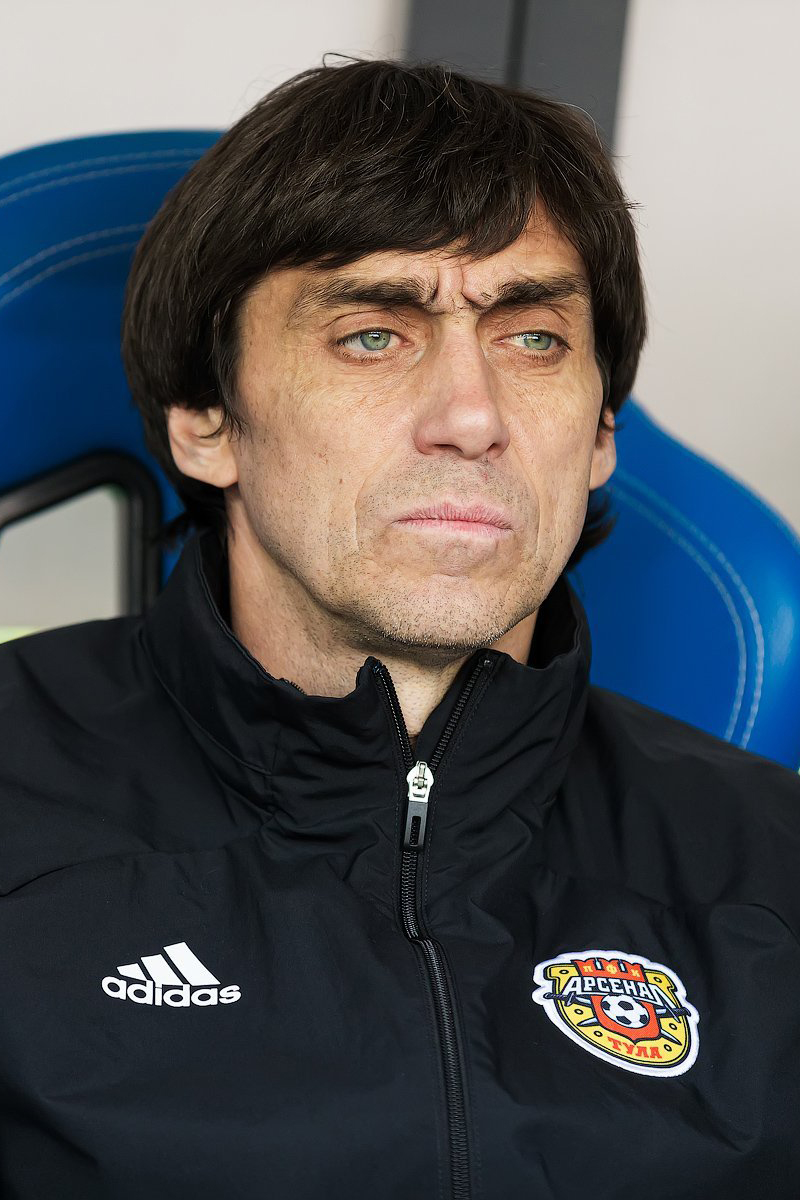
- Kovtun working with Arsenal Tula in 2021

Personal information
- Full name: Yuri Mikhailovich Kovtun
- Date of birth: 5 January 1970 (age 56)
- Place of birth: Azov, Soviet Union
- Height: 1.91 m (6 ft 3 in)
- Position: Defender

Team information
- Current team: Rotor Volgograd (assistant coach)

Youth career
- SDYuShOR-3 Azov
- ROShISP-10 Rostov-on-Don

Senior career*
Years	Team	Apps	(Gls)
1987–1988	Luch Azov	36	(1)
1989–1990	SKA Rostov-na-Donu	61	(0)
1991–1993	Rostselmash Rostov-on-Don	64	(1)
1992	Rostselmash-2 Rostov-on-Don	1	(0)
1993–1998	Dynamo Moscow	156	(5)
1999–2005	Spartak Moscow	122	(7)
2000	Spartak-2 Moscow	1	(0)
2006–2007	Alania Vladikavkaz	29	(5)
2007	MVD Rossii Moscow (amateur)		
2011–2012	Arsenal Tula (amateur)		
Total		470	(19)

International career
1994–2003	Russia	50	(2)

Managerial career
- 2007–2009: MVD Rossii Moscow
- 2010: Salyut-Energia Belgorod (assistant)
- 2013–2014: Volga Nizhny Novgorod (assistant)
- 2015–2016: Tosno (assistant)
- 2016–2017: Dynamo Moscow (assistant)
- 2019–2020: Ural Yekaterinburg (assistant)
- 2020–2021: Arsenal Tula (assistant)
- 2022–2023: Rodina Moscow (assistant)
- 2023–2024: Aktobe (assistant)
- 2025: Torpedo Moscow (assistant)
- 2025–: Rotor Volgograd (assistant)
- * Club domestic league appearances and goals

Yuri Mikhailovich Kovtun (Russian: Юрий Михайлович Ковтун; born 5 January 1970) is a Russian football coach and a former defender, well known as a 1990s Russia national football team player, as well as Dynamo Moscow and Spartak Moscow stopper. He is an assistant coach of Rotor Volgograd.

== Playing career ==
Kovtun's career started in minor Russian club Luch Azov in 1988. Then he started his career as a professional player in SKA Rostov-na-Donu and Rostselmash Rostov-on-Don. In 1992, Rostselmash and Kovtun starred in the first Russian championship where they unexpectedly promoted to 8th place. Kovtun was impressive during the season so two top teams were interested in him at the same time : Dynamo and Spartak Moscow. In 1993, Kovtun chose Dynamo Moscow and became their key player for years, until his move to Spartak in 1999.

Whereas Kovtun's only honour during his 6-year spell in Dynamo was a Russian Cup in 1995, he won 3 titles in 1999, 2000 and 2001 after joining Spartak. Moreover, he took part in numerous UEFA Champions League games and found himself a regular Russian national football team player.

== International career ==
Kovtun played for the Russian international team 50 times, scoring 2 goals. The most notable moments of his international career were his long shot goal to Yugoslavia during a 2002 World Cup qualifier and an own goal in a 0–1 away loss to Iceland Euro 2000 qualifying. He was a part of the Russian squad in the Euro 96 and World Cup 2002 finals. Kovtun was sent off in a Euro '96 match for a lunge at Germany's Dieter Eilts.

== Strengths and weaknesses ==
Kovtun's strong points as a defender were mainly great tackling, tight marking of opponents and scoring goals in the crucial matches. The main weakness of his game throughout his career was a lack of pace and acceleration. Stemming from this lack of speed, he often had to play too dirty so he could easily receive yellow cards or even be sent off (he holds the Russian League record for number of bookings).

== Current activity ==
During 2005, already a Spartak's veteran, he could not gain a place in the first team and most of the season he played for the reserves. In January 2006, he left Spartak Moscow for just relegated into Russian First Division Alania Vladikavkaz. He retired in 2007 and became a manager for MVD Rossii Moscow. MVD promoted to the Russian First Division under his supervision.

On 8 June 2009, Kovtun resigned from MVD manager position and was replaced by Vladimir Eshtrekov.

== Career statistics ==
Club	Season	League			Cup		Continental		Other		Total	
Club	Season	Division	Apps	Goals	Apps	Goals	Apps	Goals	Apps	Goals	Apps	Goals
Luch Azov	1988	Soviet Second League	36	1	0	0	–		–		36	1
SKA Rostov-na-Donu	1989	Soviet First League	23	0	1	0	–		–		24	0
SKA Rostov-na-Donu	1990	Soviet Second League	38	0	4	0	–		–		42	0
SKA Rostov-na-Donu	Total		61	0	5	0	0	0	0	0	66	0
Rostselmash Rostov-on-Don	1991	Soviet First League	38	1	0	0	–		–		38	1
Rostselmash Rostov-on-Don	1992	Russian Premier League	23	0	1	0	–		–		24	0
Rostselmash Rostov-on-Don	1993	Russian Premier League	3	0	–		–		–		3	0
Rostselmash Rostov-on-Don	Total		64	1	1	0	0	0	0	0	65	1
Rostselmash-2 Rostov-on-Don	1992	Russian Second League	1	0	–		–		–		1	0
Dynamo Moscow	1993	Russian Premier League	27	1	3	0	1 (Note: Appearances in the UEFA Cup)	0	–		31	1
Dynamo Moscow	1994	Russian Premier League	22	2	2	0	2	0	–		26	2
Dynamo Moscow	1995	Russian Premier League	25	0	4	0	3 (Note: Appearances in the UEFA Cup Winners' Cup)	0	–		32	0
Dynamo Moscow	1996	Russian Premier League	26	1	2	0	5 (Note: Two appearances in the UEFA Cup Winners' Cup, three appearances in the UEFA Cup)	0	–		33	1
Dynamo Moscow	1997	Russian Premier League	28	0	5	1	5 (Note: Appearances in the UEFA Intertoto Cup)	0	–		38	1
Dynamo Moscow	1998	Russian Premier League	28	1	1	0	4	0	–		33	1
Dynamo Moscow	Total		156	5	17	1	20	0	0	0	193	6
Spartak Moscow	1999	Russian Premier League	26	2	1	0	7 (Note: Six appearances in the UEFA Champions League, one appearance in the UEFA Cup)	0	–		34	2
Spartak Moscow	2000	Russian Premier League	17	1	5	0	8 (Note: Appearances in the UEFA Champions League)	0	–		30	1
Spartak Moscow	2001	Russian Premier League	26	1	2	0	9	0	–		37	1
Spartak Moscow	2002	Russian Premier League	16	1	1	0	6	0	–		23	1
Spartak Moscow	2003	Russian Premier League	23	2	2	1	2	0	3 (Note: Appearances in the Russian Premier League Cup)	0	30	3
Spartak Moscow	2004	Russian Premier League	14	0	1	0	6 (Note: Four appearances in the UEFA Intertoto Cup, two appearances in the UEFA Cup)	0	0	0	21	0
Spartak Moscow	2005	Russian Premier League	0	0	0	0	–		–		0	0
Spartak Moscow	Total		122	7	12	1	38	0	3	0	175	8
Spartak-2 Moscow	2000	Russian Second League	1	0	–		–		–		1	0
Alania Vladikavkaz	2006	Russian Second League	26	5	2	0	–		–		28	5
Alania Vladikavkaz	2007	Russian First League	3	0	0	0	–		–		3	0
Alania Vladikavkaz	Total		29	5	2	0	0	0	0	0	31	5
Career total			470	19	37	2	58	0	3	0	568	21

== Honours ==
- 1999, 2000, 2001 Russian Premier League
- 1995, 2003 Russian Cup
