= Gorelov =

Gorelov (Russian: Горе́лов), female form Gorelova (Russian: Горе́лова), is a Russian surname.

== Notable people ==
Notable people having this surname include:

- Galina Gorelova, also known as Halina Harelava, Belarusian composer
- Gavriil Gorelov, Russian painter
- Igor Gorelov, Russian footballer
- Natalya Gorelova, Russian runner
- Nikolay Gorelov, Russian cyclist
- Sergei Gorelov, Russian footballer
