= Khramtsov =

Khramtsov (Russian: Храмцов) is a Russian masculine surname, its feminine counterpart is Khramtsova. The surname may refer to the following notable people:

- Dmitrii Khramtsov (born 1999), Russian slalom canoeist
- Maksim Khramtsov (born 1998), Russian taekwondo practitioner
- Oleksiy Khramtsov (born 1975), Ukrainian football defender
- Sergei Khramtsov (born 1977), Russian football player
