= Oleg Romantsev =

Russian footballer and manager

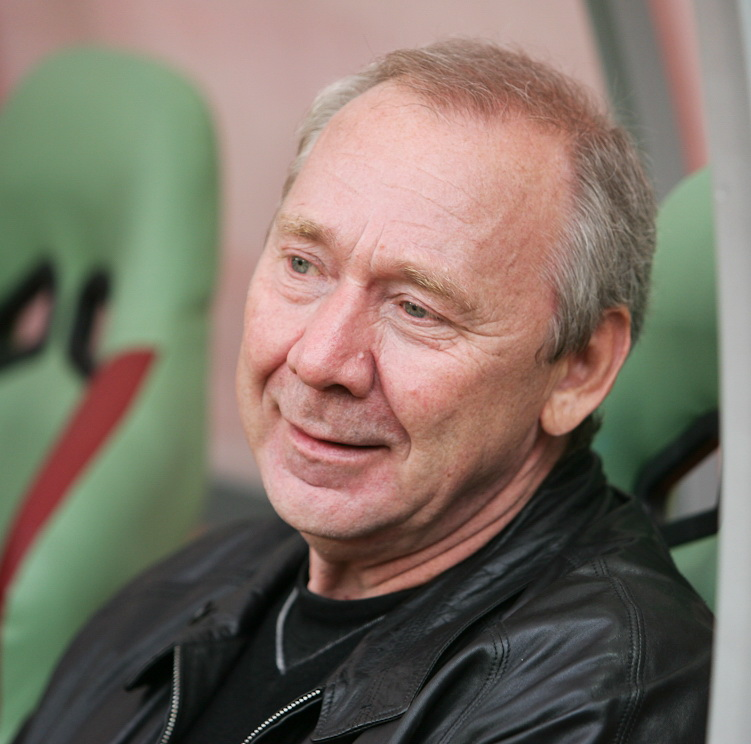
- Romantsev in 2012

Personal information
- Full name: Oleg Ivanovich Romantsev
- Date of birth: 4 January 1954 (age 72)
- Place of birth: Gavrilovskoye, Ryazan Oblast, Russian SFSR, Soviet Union
- Height: 1.78 m (5 ft 10 in)
- Position: Defender

Team information
- Current team: FC Pari Nizhny Novgorod (advisor)

Senior career*
Years	Team	Apps	(Gls)
1971–1976	Avtomobilist Krasnoyarsk	60	(10)
1976–1983	Spartak Moscow	180	(6)

International career
1980–1982	Soviet Union	9	(0)

Managerial career
- 1984–1987: Krasnaya Presnya Moscow
- 1988: Spartak Ordzhonikidze
- 1989–1995: Spartak Moscow
- 1994–1996: Russia
- 1997–2003: Spartak Moscow
- 1998–2002: Russia
- 2003–2004: Saturn Ramenskoye
- 2004–2005: Dynamo Moscow
- 2009–2012: Spartak Moscow (consultant)
Medal record
Representing Soviet Union
Men's Football
Bronze medal – third place	1980 Moscow	Team competition
- * Club domestic league appearances and goals

Oleg Ivanovich Romantsev (Russian: Олег Иванович Романцев; born 4 January 1954) is a Soviet/Russian former international footballer and coach who is currently an advisor for FC Pari Nizhny Novgorod. Romantsev was acclaimed for his success with Spartak Moscow, whom he led to a record eight domestic league titles, and his work with the Russian national team. He is considered by some observers to be the finest coach in the history of Russian football.

== Early years ==
Oleg Romantsev was born on 4 January 1954 in the selo of Gavrilovskoye, Spassky District, Ryazan Oblast, situated about 150 miles southeast of Moscow. The son of a road construction manager, Romantsev's family led a peripatetic existence, living in various places including the Kola Peninsula, Altay, and Kyrgyzstan before settling in Krasnoyarsk in the early 1960s where, at age 12, the young man worked as a loader's assistant at a house-building factory on a salary of 40 roubles. Having initially harboured a passion for trains, Romantsev found himself turning to football for support after his father walked out on the family, leaving his mother to support him and his brother and sister alone.

"[As a child] I never dreamed of a professional football career. At [the] time I thought it was just a beautiful game, not a profession for which you could get money. One dream was to become a train driver. In Krasnoyarsk, we lived relatively close to the railway and I really liked watching the passing trains… racing into the distance, dreaming of someday standing at the helm. By the way, this dream has not yet passed. And today I still dream of riding in the cab, from that I think I would get great pleasure".

— Romantsev on his ambitions as a youth.

Romantsev joined a local youth team named Metallurg where he played as a striker and within two years was appointed the team's captain. His performances there earned him an invite to play for Avtomobilist, another Krasnoyarsk team, at the Siberia & Far East Youth Championship where he scored seven goals in four games. He stayed with Avtomobilist after the tournament where he helped them to third place in the USSR Youth Championship.

== Career ==
In 1971, Romantsev was promoted to the senior team of Avtomobilist, who at the time were competing in the Soviet Second League. He marked his debut for the senior team with a goal and scored twice on his second appearance, later becoming a first team regular. Romantsev eventually converted from a striker to a left-back and came to the attention of clubs such as Dynamo Kiev, who had begun to take note of the young defender's abilities. In 1976, Avtomobilist played a friendly against the club which would ultimately define Romantsev's footballing career – Spartak Moscow.

After impressing Spartak representatives during the match, Romantsev was offered terms and joined soon after. Initially disillusioned with life at the Soviet powerhouse club – he spent just two matches there before returning to Krasnoyarsk citing an "unprofessional atmosphere" – he was convinced to return to the fold in 1977 after Konstantin Beskov, who was tasked with returning Spartak to the Top League after their relegation in 1976, persuaded him to rejoin. Romantsev had not accepted the offer outright and dismissed Beskov's approach but was eventually persuaded after spending time speaking with Beskov, who was also the manager of the Soviet Union national team, as part of the squad for the qualifiers for the 1978 World Cup.

Romantsev would go on to play 180 matches for the club, scoring six goals in the process. He was appointed club captain in 1979, and held the position until injuries brought about the end of his playing career in 1983, at the age of just 29. In his time as a player with Spartak, Romantsev won the 1979 Soviet Top League, the 1977 Soviet First League title and finished runner-up in the Soviet Top League in 1980, 1981 and 1983.

Romantsev made nine appearances for the Soviet Union national team. He also played six matches and scored one goal for the bronze-winning team at the 1980 Summer Olympics.

== Managerial career ==
=== Krasnaya Presnya ===
A year after the end of his playing career, Spartak Moscow's founder Nikolai Starostin offered Romantsev a coaching role at Krasnaya Presnya – a little-known Moscow club in the Soviet Second League. It was here that he first crossed paths with future Russia star Aleksandr Mostovoi, then a 16-year-old central midfielder. The two quickly forged a close relationship that was to continue long into their professional careers. In an interview with UEFA's Dmitri Rogovitski, Mostovoi said: "He was a very inexperienced coach back then but we quickly forged a close relationship. He became my father in football, it was thanks to him that I grew into a serious player." Romantsev would ultimately spend three years in charge of Presnya, before spending several months in charge of Spartak Ordzhonikidze (now Spartak) in 1988.

=== Spartak Moscow ===
Later that year, Romantsev returned to the club where he made his name as a player, and where he would spend the bulk of his managerial career, as he took up the post of Spartak Moscow manager. At the time, it was considered a surprise move. Mostovoi recalled of his arrival: "His appointment was unexpected. I was abroad with the youth international team and when we returned home for training, [former Spartak manager Konstantin] Beskov was gone and Romantsev was there in his place. I asked him without thinking, "What are you doing here?' He said that he was our new coach." Romantsev's impact was hard-felt and immediate – Spartak claimed the Russian title in his debut season of 1989, only their second since Romantsev himself had captained the team in 1979.

Under Romantsev, Spartak pioneered a style of football that was based on "short passing and quick thinking". He began to develop a reputation as a disciplinarian who obsessively analysed and scrutinised the performances of his team and his opponents. "Romantsev would set about his task as manager with an obsessive zeal, often pouring (sic) over his squads' every mistake, usually ignoring any positives from their performances." He trained his players hard, implementing notoriously harsh sessions known as "sbori" that were described as being akin to "a Special Forces regime." The authority that Romantsev wielded over his players was exemplified by star midfielder Yegor Titov's explanation for why he never left Spartak despite arousing the interest of Bayern Munich, "Honestly? I was afraid to go to Oleg Romantsev’s office and tell him I was leaving." Romantsev displayed a similarly harsh demeanour towards the press. One anecdote recounted a journalist approaching him for an interview as Romantsev was smoking near the team bus only to be rebuked with the message, "What?! Can't you see I'm talking to the doctor?"

Spartak dominated Russian football under Romantsev in the 1990s, using a system whereby the club discovered young players from across the former USSR, developed their talents to the full and then, availing of the newfound freedom to do business with the West following the fall of Communism in Europe, proceeded to sell them on to Western European clubs for a significant profit. A string of future Russian internationals passed through Spartak's doors during this time – Valery Karpin, Dmitry Alenichev, Viktor Onopko, Igor Shalimov, Dmitry Radchenko and Sergei Rodionov all came and went with the money from their sales funding the next iteration. By the end of Romantsev's time at the club, Spartak had won nine league titles (three successively from 1992 to 1994, and six in succession from 1996 to 2001) as well as four Russian Cups. Under his tenure, Spartak also reached the semi-finals of all three major European competitions (the 1990–91 European Cup, 1992–93 European Cup Winners' Cup and the 1997–98 UEFA Cup) – a run that saw them eliminate sides such as Real Madrid, Liverpool and Diego Maradona's Napoli.

=== Russia ===
Romantsev took up the reins of the Russian national football team with the departure of Pavel Sadyrin after Russia's exit from the 1994 World Cup. He was tasked with ensuring qualification for Euro 96, held in England, in two years and combined the role with his post as Spartak manager (and chairman, a rank to which he was appointed in 1993) in a dual capacity. He resisted the temptation to rebuild the squad and instead placed his faith in a great deal of the players who had taken part in the World Cup. Russia were placed in qualifying Group 8 alongside Faroe Islands, Finland, Greece, San Marino and Scotland. They finished in first place with eight wins and two draws from their ten games. At the tournament itself they were placed in Group C with Czech Republic, Germany and Italy – dubbed the "group of death", featuring the eventual tournament winners Germany and beaten finalists Czech Republic. Russia finished bottom of the group after a 2–1 defeat to Italy in the opening match and a 3–0 defeat to Germany in a game that confirmed their exit from the tournament. The final match was a 3–3 draw with the Czechs. The campaign was a disappointing one and also was blighted by mild controversy after Sergei Kiriakov was dropped after calling Romantsev an "arsehole." He, along with two other players, was sent home by Romantsev during the campaign. Romantsev left the post, to be replaced by Boris Ignatyev, and returned to Spartak after the tournament.

Drawn in Group 4 for qualification for the 2000 European Championship in a group containing Andorra, Armenia, France, Iceland and Ukraine, Russia lost their first three games - a sequence of results that outraged the Russian Football Union and led to the sacking of Anatoliy Byshovets. Despite his initial reluctance ("I cannot achieve anything in our football environment"), Romantsev was eventually talked around and re-appointed as national team manager. He oversaw a major turnaround in form with Russia winning their next six games on the bounce, the most impressive result being a 3–2 victory over France in Paris. Heading into the final game, against Ukraine, a win would have seen Russia qualify outright as group winners. However, a late mistake by goalkeeper Alexandr Filimonov meant the game finished 1–1 despite Russia having taken the lead. They would not be competing in the European Championship in Belgium and The Netherlands. The nature of the defeat struck Romantsev particularly hard. So much so that when mention of the game came up during a 2014 TV show with Romanstev as a participant, he remarked, "Please don't remind me of the most terrible moments of my life. I am trying to forget them. None of us wanted to live after that game against Ukraine. We felt like it would have been better to shoot ourselves or at least to quit football forever. I don't remember what exactly happened afterwards, it's all in a fog. That was cruel and undeserved after all we had achieved, as if we had run a marathon and then dropped dead."

The improvement in the team's form and coming so close to qualification having lost their opening three matches was enough to ensure that Romantsev retained the position for qualification for the 2002 World Cup where Russia were drawn in UEFA qualification Group 1 with Faroe Islands, Luxembourg, Slovenia, Switzerland and Yugoslavia. Russia again finished top of the group under Romantsev, winning seven, drawing two and losing just one of their ten qualifying games. In Japan and South Korea, Russia were drawn into Group H with Belgium, Tunisia and co-hosts Japan. In their first game Russia achieved a 2–0 victory over Tunisia, but lost their next match to Japan 1–0, causing riots to erupt in Moscow. For their last game against Belgium, Russia needed a draw to take them to the second round, but lost 3–2 and were eliminated. Romantsev quit as manager after the result.

=== Later career ===
As the 21st century approached, some observers commented that the strain of managing both Spartak and Russia was proving too much for Romantsev and his health was now showing signs of decline. He was suffering from alcoholism and began to develop an adversarial relationship with Andrei Chervichenko – Spartak's new chairman and the senior director of LUKoil who had become one of Spartak's biggest corporate sponsors and also the man to whom Romantsev had sold his shares in Spartak. Romantsev made public announcements to the effect that Chervichenko was disrespecting the club and separately criticised UEFA and referees of cheating in order to prevent Russian clubs from progressing in Europe. According to Marc Bennetts, "The once genius trainer descended into an alcoholic haze, detached from reality and the players around him". Spartak continued to secure the title under Romantsev but by far smaller margins, and in 2003, when Romantsev accused Chervichenko of trying to throw the result of the 2003 Russian Cup final for $1.5m, Romantsev was finally sacked by the club.

Two quick spells as manager of Saturn Ramenskoe (September 2003 – February 2004) and Dynamo Moscow (October 2004 – May 2005) followed but brought no success. Romantsev stayed away from football for a period of four years before it was announced on 23 April 2009, that Romantsev had agreed to help the then-manager of Spartak, Valeri Karpin, as a consultant coach. Several years later he left this post for good.

In 2018 an autobiography Romantsev: The Truth about Me and Spartak relating to Romantsev's player and coach career was published. According to the book, the reason for Romantsev's retirement was his "tiredness" from football. He told that returning to coach activity would require from him full involvement, which has become impossible for him through the years.

== Public life ==
Romantsev was a member of the Communist Party of the Soviet Union as team captain. In the fall of 1999, on the eve of the elections to the State Duma, Romantsev entered the leadership of one of the participants in the election campaign - he was included in the Coordination Council of the Interregional Unity Movement but claimed that this was done without his consent. Romantsev spoke of his fatigue from the "eternal Russian mess" and reluctance to participate in political games. Later, he officially joined United Russia.

Romantsev claimed that he was more than once offered to continue his career abroad, where life was calmer and there were no serious political upheavals like those of Russia in the 1990s. However, he sincerely wanted to stay in his homeland to give at least some joy and pleasure to those who were not "free to choose where to live." In 2000, he said that in the event of an uncontrolled wave of migration from Russia, the country, in the worst-case scenario, would fall to "nonentities" who could "rule the show, rob, kill, and deceive."

Romantsev participated in the "Smart Football Academy: Legacy" project and in a number of programs for the development of children's football in Russia, organized on the eve of the 2018 FIFA World Cup.

== Honours ==
=== As a player ===
Spartak Moscow

- Soviet Top League: 1979
  - runner-up: 1980, 1981, 1983
  - third place: 1982
- Soviet First League: 1977
- Soviet Cup
  - runner-up: 1981

Soviet Union

- Olympic Games
  - Bronze medal: 1980

=== As a coach ===
Spartak Moscow

- Soviet Top League: 1989
  - runner-up: 1991
- Russian Premier League: 1992, 1993, 1994, 1997, 1998, 1999, 2000, 2001
  - third place: 1995, 2002
- Soviet Cup: 1992
- Russian Cup: 1994, 1998, 2003
- CIS Cup: 1993, 1994, 1995, 1999, 2000, 2001
  - runner-up: 1997, 1998, 2002
- European Cup
  - semi-finalist: 1990–91
- UEFA Cup Winners' Cup
  - semi-finalist: 1992–93
- UEFA Cup
  - semi-finalist: 1997–98
