= Emil Tsatskin =

Russian footballer

Personal information
- Full name: Emil Vasilyevich Tsatskin
- Date of birth: 3 June 1975 (age 51)
- Place of birth: Leningrad, Russian SFSR
- Height: 1.89 m (6 ft 2 in)
- Positions: Forward; midfielder

Youth career
- FC Dinamo Sukhumi
- RO UOR Rostov-on-Don

Senior career*
Years	Team	Apps	(Gls)
1992–1993	FC Rostselmash-d Rostov-on-Don	54	(10)
1994–1995	FC Metallurg Krasny Sulin	47	(15)
1995	FC Torpedo Taganrog	10	(4)
1996	FC Rotor Volgograd	3	(0)
1996	FC Rostselmash Rostov-on-Don	6	(0)
1997	FC Energiya Pyatigorsk	16	(4)
1997–1999	FC Dynamo Stavropol	69	(9)
2000–2002	FC Kuban Krasnodar	85	(24)
2003	FC Volgar-Gazprom Astrakhan	23	(5)
2003–2004	FC Luch-Energiya Vladivostok	31	(5)
2005	FC Metallurg Lipetsk	7	(1)
2006	FC Okzhetpes	5	(1)
- * Club domestic league appearances and goals

Emil Vasilyevich Tsatskin (Russian: Эмиль Васильевич Цацкин; born 3 June 1975) is a former Russian professional footballer.

== Club career ==
He made his professional debut in the Russian Second Division in 1992 for FC Rostselmash-d Rostov-on-Don.

== Honours ==
- Russian Premier League bronze: 1996.
