= Shamil Isayev =

Russian footballer (1964–2019)

Personal information
- Full name: Shamil Karamagomedovich Isayev
- Date of birth: 19 March 1964
- Place of birth: Dokshunino, Kabardino-Balkaria, Russian SFSR
- Date of death: 15 February 2019 (aged 54)
- Height: 1.75 m (5 ft 9 in)
- Positions: Midfielder; forward

Senior career*
Years	Team	Apps	(Gls)
1982	FC Uralan Elista	31	(7)
1984	FC Uralan Elista	29	(10)
1985	PFC Spartak Nalchik	27	(5)
1988	PFC Spartak Nalchik	36	(11)
1989	SC Tavriya Simferopol	40	(5)
1990	FC Chornomorets Odessa	0	(0)
1990	SC Tavriya Simferopol	24	(4)
1990–1994	FC Spartak Vladikavkaz	89	(2)
1994	PFC Spartak Nalchik	19	(5)
1995	FC Spartak-Alania Vladikavkaz	1	(0)
1995	PFC Spartak Nalchik	20	(7)
1996–1997	FC Avtozapchast Baksan	19	(10)
1997	FC Nart Nartkala	20	(3)
1998	FC Kuzbass Kemerovo	5	(0)
1999	FC Nart Nartkala	8	(1)
2001	FC Nart Nartkala	9	(0)
2002	FC Shakhtyor Shakhty	11	(1)
- * Club domestic league appearances and goals

Shamil Karamagomedovich Isayev (Russian: Шамиль Карамагомедович Исаев; 19 March 1964 – 15 February 2019) was a Russian professional footballer.

== Club career ==
He made his professional debut in the Soviet Second League in 1982 for FC Uralan Elista. He played 2 games in the UEFA Cup 1993–94 for FC Spartak Vladikavkaz.

== Death ==
He died on 15 February 2019, aged 54.

== Honours ==
- Russian Premier League champion: 1995.
- Russian Premier League runner-up: 1992.
