= Ramiz Mamedov =

Russian footballer (born 1972)

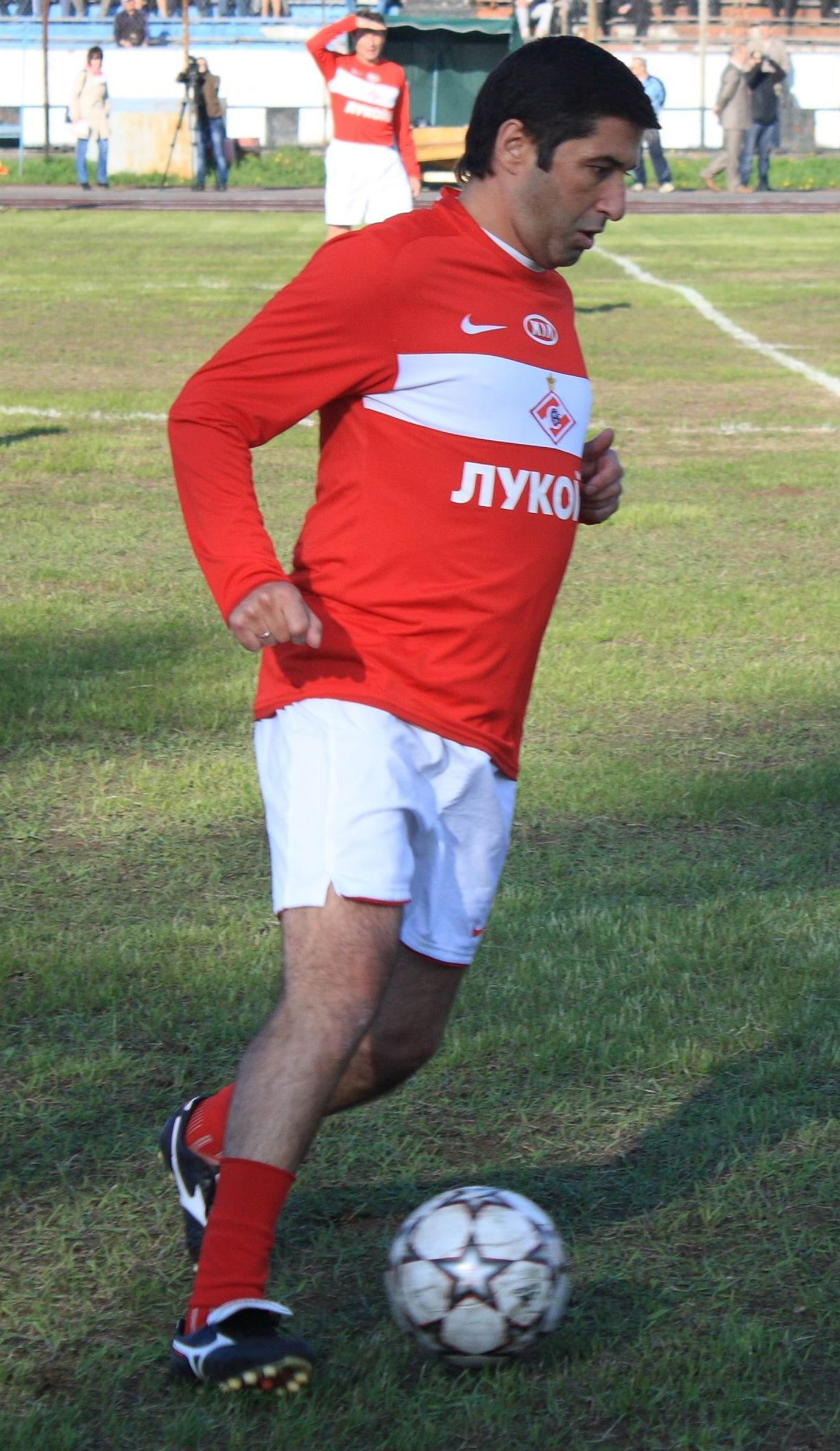
- Mamedov with Spartak Veterans in 2010

Personal information
- Full name: Ramiz Mehman oglu Mamedov
- Date of birth: 21 August 1972 (age 54)
- Place of birth: Moscow, Soviet Union
- Height: 1.77 m (5 ft 10 in)
- Position: Defender

Youth career
- 1979–1991: Spartak Moscow

Senior career*
Years	Team	Apps	(Gls)
1991–1998	Spartak Moscow	125	(6)
1998	Arsenal Tula	13	(0)
1999	Krylia Sovetov	14	(1)
1999–2000	Dynamo Kyiv	13	(0)
1999–2000	→ Dynamo-2 Kyiv	15	(0)
2000–2001	→ Sturm Graz (loan)	14	(0)
2001	Lokomotiv Moscow	0	(0)
2002	Sokol Saratov	0	(0)
2002–2003	Volgar-Gazprom	18	(1)
2003	Luch-Energiya	10	(0)
Total		222	(8)

International career
1993–1994	Russia U21	6	(0)
1994–1998	Russia	10	(0)
- * Club domestic league appearances and goals

Ramiz Mamedov (Azerbaijani: Ramiz Məmmədov; Russian: Рамиз Мамедов; born 21 August 1972) is a Russian former professional footballer who played as a defender, notably for Spartak Moscow in the 1990s.

== Club career ==
Mamedov's career as player started in 1991 and finished in 2003, during this time he played for Spartak Moscow, Arsenal Tula, Krylia Sovetov, FC Dynamo Kyiv, SK Sturm Graz, Volgar-Gazprom and Luch-Energiya.

== International career ==
As a member of the Russia national under-21 football team, Mamedov competed at the 1994 UEFA European Under-21 Football Championship in France. They were defeated in the quarter-final by the France.

On 17 August 1994, he was called up for the first time to the Russia national football team in a friendly against Austria.

== Career statistics ==
Appearances and goals by club, season and competition
Club	Season	League			Cup (Note: Includes Soviet Cup, Russian Cup, Ukrainian Cup, Austrian Cup.)		Continental		Total	
Club	Season	Division	Apps	Goals	Apps	Goals	Apps	Goals	Apps	Goals
Spartak Moscow	1991	Soviet Top League	0	0	1	0	—		1	0
Spartak Moscow	1992	Russian Top League	10	1	1	0	—		11	1
Spartak Moscow	1993	Russian Top League	30	0	1	0	8	0	39	0
Spartak Moscow	1994	Russian Top League	22	1	4	0	4	0	30	1
Spartak Moscow	1995	Russian Top League	30	3	3	0	5	2	38	5
Spartak Moscow	1996	Russian Top League	14	0	0	0	6	0	20	0
Spartak Moscow	1997	Russian Top League	19	1	3	0	1	0	23	1
Spartak Moscow	Total		125	6	13	0	24	2	162	8
Arsenal Tula	1998	Russian National League	13	0	3	0	—		16	0
Krylia Sovetov	1999	Russian Premier League	14	1	0	0	—		14	1
Dynamo Kyiv	1999–2000	Ukrainian Premier League	13	0	3	0	9	0	25	0
Dynamo-2 Kyiv (loan)	1999–2000	Ukrainian First League	15	0	0	0	—		15	0
Sturm Graz (loan)	2000–01	Austrian Bundesliga	14	0	0	0	12	0	26	0
Volgar Astrakhan	2002	Russian National League	8	1	0	0	—		8	1
Volgar Astrakhan	2003	Russian National League	10	0	0	0	—		10	0
Volgar Astrakhan	Total		18	0	0	0	0	0	18	0
Luch-Energiya	2003	Russian Professional League	10	0	0	0	—		10	0
Career total			222	8	19	2	45	2	286	12

== Honours ==
Spartak Moscow

- Russian Premier League: 1992, 1993, 1994, 1996, 1997
- Soviet Cup: 1991–92
- Russian Cup: 1993–94, 1997–98
- CIS Cup: 1993

Dynamo Kyiv

- Ukrainian Premier League: 1999–00
- Ukrainian Cup: 1999–00

Individual

- Sport-Express's Best right defender of Russian Premier League: 1994, 1995
- Mamedov became the first five-time champion of Russia Premier League (1992, 1993, 1994, 1996, 1997)
- Mamedov became the first player to become the champion of Russia and Ukraine, with teams of Spartak Moscow and Dynamo Kyiv.
