= Ilya Borodin (footballer) =

Russian footballer

Personal information
- Full name: Ilya Aleksandrovich Borodin
- Date of birth: 6 July 1976 (age 50)
- Place of birth: Volgograd, Russian SFSR
- Height: 1.78 m (5 ft 10 in)
- Position: Forward

Youth career
- FC Rotor Volgograd

Senior career*
| Years | Team | Apps | (Gls) |
| 1992–1996 | FC Rotor-d Volgograd | 95 | (14) |
| 1995 | FC Rotor Volgograd | 1 | (0) |
| 1996 | FC Torpedo Volzhsky | 16 | (2) |
| 1996 | FC Rotor Volgograd | 3 | (1) |
| 1997 | FC Lada-Grad Dimitrovgrad | 36 | (6) |
| 1998–1999 | FC Rotor Volgograd | 15 | (1) |
| 1998–1999 | FC Rotor-2 Volgograd | 19 | (4) |
| 1999 | FC Dynamo Stavropol | 10 | (1) |
| 2000 | FC Tyumen | 23 | (2) |
| 2001–2004 | FC Lisma-Mordovia Saransk | 132 | (64) |
| 2005 | FC Volga Nizhny Novgorod | 20 | (2) |
| 2006 | FC Energetik Uren | 20 | (7) |
| 2007 | did not play | | |
| 2008–2009 | FC Nizhny Novgorod | 51 | (30) |
| 2009 | FC Gornyak Uchaly | 11 | (7) |
| 2010 | FC Zvezda Ryazan | 29 | (15) |
| 2011 | FC Kaluga | 28 | (9) |
- * Club domestic league appearances and goals

Ilya Aleksandrovich Borodin (Russian: Илья Александрович Бородин; born 6 July 1976) is a former Russian professional footballer.

== Club career ==
He made his debut in the Russian Premier League in 1995 for FC Rotor Volgograd. He played 1 game in the UEFA Cup 1998–99 for FC Rotor Volgograd.

== Honours ==
- Russian Premier League bronze: 1996.
- Russian Second Division Zone Povolzhye top scorer: 2001 (24 goals).
