= Valeri Voytenko =

Russian footballer and coach

Personal information
- Full name: Valeri Ivanovich Voytenko
- Date of birth: 7 January 1950 (age 76)
- Height: 1.73 m (5 ft 8 in)
- Position: Defender

Senior career*
Years	Team	Apps	(Gls)
1968–1969	FC Uralmash Sverdlovsk	37	(1)
1970–1971	PFC CSKA Moscow	25	(0)
1972–1979	FC Uralmash Sverdlovsk	228	(8)

Managerial career
- 1989: FC Uralmash Sverdlovsk (assistant)
- 1990–1992: FC MTsOP-Metallurg Verkhnyaya Pyshma (assistant)
- 1993–1995: FC Uralmash Yekaterinburg (assistant)
- 1996: FC Uralmash Yekaterinburg
- * Club domestic league appearances and goals

Valeri Ivanovich Voytenko (Russian: Валерий Иванович Войтенко; born 7 January 1950) is a Russian professional football coach and a former player.

As of 2009, he works as a Professional Football League delegate at the Russian First Division and Russian Second Division matches (he reports the general organization of the game and rates the referees).
