= Gavrilovsky, Republic of Bashkortostan =

Gavrilovsky Гавриловский
- Khutor
- Location within Bashkortostan Location within Russia
- Coordinates: 52°29′N 56°29′E
- Country: Russia
- Region: Bashkortostan
- District: Kugarchinsky District
- Time zone: UTC+5:00

Gavrilovsky (Russian: Гавриловский) is a rural locality (a khutor) in Isimovsky Selsoviet, Kugarchinsky District, Bashkortostan, Russia. The population was 4 as of 2010. There is 1 street.

== Geography ==
Gavrilovsky is located 32 km south of Mrakovo (the district's administrative centre) by road. Mukachevo is the nearest rural locality.
