= 1977 Soviet First League =

Soviet First League
- Season: 1977

The 1977 Soviet First League was the seventh season of the Soviet First League and the 37th season of the Soviet second tier league competition.

== Final standings ==
Pos	Rep	Team	Pld	W	D	L	GF	GA	GD	Pts	Promotion or relegation
1	RUS	(Russian Soviet Federative Socialist Republic) Spartak Moscow	38	22	10	6	83	42	+41	54	Promoted
2	UZB	(Uzbek Soviet Socialist Republic) Pahtakor Tashkent	38	19	14	5	57	28	+29	52	Promoted
3	UKR	(Ukrainian Soviet Socialist Republic) Tavriya Simferopol	38	21	7	10	57	34	+23	49	
4	BLR	(Byelorussian Soviet Socialist Republic) Dinamo Minsk	38	19	9	10	48	29	+19	47	
5	TJK	(Tajik Soviet Socialist Republic) Pamir Dushanbe	38	19	7	12	54	36	+18	45	
6	RUS	(Russian Soviet Federative Socialist Republic) Kuzbass Kemerovo	38	20	5	13	51	38	+13	45	
7	RUS	(Russian Soviet Federative Socialist Republic) Terek Grozny	38	17	7	14	59	48	+11	41	
8	RUS	(Russian Soviet Federative Socialist Republic) Shinnik Yaroslavl	38	14	13	11	50	44	+6	41	
9	GEO	(Georgian Soviet Socialist Republic) Torpedo Kutaisi	38	15	8	15	45	48	−3	38	
10	RUS	(Russian Soviet Federative Socialist Republic) SKA Rostov-on-Don	38	12	12	14	43	48	−5	36	
11	MDA	(Moldavian Soviet Socialist Republic) Nistru Chișinău	38	11	14	13	45	51	−6	36	
12	RUS	(Russian Soviet Federative Socialist Republic) Uralmash Sverdlovsk	38	13	10	15	52	62	−10	36	
13	RUS	(Russian Soviet Federative Socialist Republic) Dinamo Leningrad	38	11	12	15	51	54	−3	34	
14	UKR	(Ukrainian Soviet Socialist Republic) Spartak Ivano-Frankivsk	38	10	14	14	38	52	−14	34	
15	RUS	(Russian Soviet Federative Socialist Republic) Spartak Orzhonikidze	38	11	11	16	38	45	−7	33	
16	UKR	(Ukrainian Soviet Socialist Republic) Metalurh Zaporizhzhia	38	11	11	16	35	48	−13	33	
17	TKM	(Turkmen Soviet Socialist Republic) Kolhozchi Ashgabad	38	12	8	18	43	60	−17	32	
18	UKR	(Ukrainian Soviet Socialist Republic) Kryvbass Kryvyi Rih	38	10	8	20	43	59	−16	28	Relegated
19	RUS	(Russian Soviet Federative Socialist Republic) Zvezda Perm	38	7	10	21	32	62	−30	24	Relegated
20	RUS	(Russian Soviet Federative Socialist Republic) Rubin Kazan	38	6	10	22	40	76	−36	22	Relegated

Source: rsssf.com

== Number of teams by union republic ==
Rank	Union republic	Number of teams	Club(s)
1	RSFSR	10	Terek Grozny, Kuban Krasnodar, Shinnik Yaroslavl, Kuzbass Kemerevo, Uralmash Sverdlovsk, Spartak Ordzhonikidze, Dinamo Leningrad, Krylia Sovetov Kuibyshev, SKA Rostov-na-Donu
2	Ukrainian SSR	4	Tavria Simferopol, Prykarpatye Ivano-Frankovsk, Metallurg Zaporozhye, Krivbass Krivoi Rog
3	Uzbek SSR	1	Pakhtakor Tashkent
3	Belarusian SSR	1	Dinamo Minsk
3	Tajik SSR	1	Pamir Dushanbe
3	Georgian SSR	1	Torpedo Kutaisi
3	Moldavian SSR	1	Nistru Kishinev
3	Turkmen SSR	1	Kolhozchi Ashkhabad

== See also ==
- Soviet First League
