= Andrei Dyomkin =

Russian footballer

Personal information
- Full name: Andrei Petrovich Dyomkin
- Date of birth: 21 February 1976 (age 50)
- Place of birth: Moscow, Soviet Union
- Height: 1.82 m (6 ft 0 in)
- Position: Forward

Youth career
- FC Dynamo Moscow

Senior career*
Years	Team	Apps	(Gls)
1995–1997	FC Dynamo Moscow	7	(0)
1997–1998	R.S.C. Anderlecht	0	(0)
1998–1999	K.V. Kortrijk	33	(10)
1999–2001	K.F.C. Germinal Beerschot	69	(16)
2001–2002	K.S.K. Beveren	16	(0)
2002–2004	FC Dynamo Moscow	12	(2)
2004–2005	FC Tom Tomsk	19	(4)
2005	FC Chkalovets Novosibirsk (loan)	9	(0)
2006	FC Tom Tomsk	9	(2)
2008	FC Sheksna Cherepovets	20	(2)
2008–2009	FC MVD Rossii Moscow	29	(8)
2009	FC MVD Rossii-2 Moscow (D4)		

International career
1995	Russia U-21	2	(1)
- * Club domestic league appearances and goals

Andrei Petrovich Dyomkin (Russian: Андрей Петрович Дёмкин; born 21 February 1976) is a Russian former footballer.
