= Shchigry =

Shchigry (Russian: Щигры) is the name of several inhabited localities in Russia.

Urban localities

- Shchigry, Kursk Oblast, a town in Kursk Oblast incorporated as a town of oblast significance of the same name

Rural localities

- Shchigry, Kaluga Oblast, a selo in Zhizdrinsky District of Kaluga Oblast
- Shchigry, Kurgan Oblast, a selo in Shchigrovsky Selsoviet of Mokrousovsky District of Kurgan Oblast
- Shchigry, Oryol Oblast, a village in Suryaninsky Selsoviet of Bolkhovsky District of Oryol Oblast
- Shchigry, Saratov Oblast, a selo in Ivanteyevsky District of Saratov Oblast
