= Robert Bitarov =

Russian footballer

Personal information
- Full name: Robert Arkadyevich Bitarov
- Date of birth: 23 March 1976 (age 50)
- Place of birth: Ordzhonikidze, Russian SFSR
- Height: 1.78 m (5 ft 10 in)
- Position: Midfielder

Youth career
- FC Avtodor Vladikavkaz

Senior career*
Years	Team	Apps	(Gls)
1994	FC Spartak Vladikavkaz	0	(0)
1994	FC Avtodor Vladikavkaz	8	(0)
1995–1998	FC Alania Vladikavkaz	29	(1)
1999	PFC Spartak Nalchik	14	(2)
1999	FC Dynamo Stavropol	17	(1)
2000–2003	FC Alania Vladikavkaz	79	(4)
2004	FC Ekibastuzets	28	(10)
2005	FC Atyrau	15	(1)
2006–2009	FC Alania Vladikavkaz	62	(9)
2012	FC Metallurg Vladikavkaz (D4)		

International career
1996–1997	Russia U-21	7	(0)
- * Club domestic league appearances and goals

Robert Arkadyevich Bitarov (Russian: Роберт Аркадьевич Битаров; born 23 March 1976) is a Russian former professional footballer.

== Club career ==
He made his debut in the Russian Premier League in 1996 for FC Alania Vladikavkaz. He played 3 games in the UEFA Cup for FC Alania Vladikavkaz in 1996/97 and 2000/01 seasons.

== Honours ==
- Russian Premier League runner-up: 1996 (played in the "golden match" that decided the championship).
