= Aslan Goplachev =

Russian footballer and coach

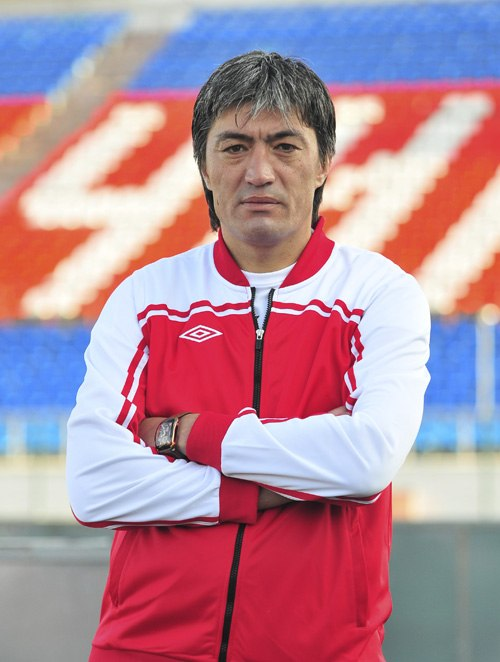

Personal information
- Full name: Aslan Akhmedovich Goplachev
- Date of birth: 26 December 1970 (age 55)
- Place of birth: Nalchik, Russian SFSR
- Height: 1.86 m (6 ft 1 in)
- Positions: Striker; midfielder

Team information
- Current team: Kuban Krasnodar (assistant manager)

Youth career
- Elbrus Nalchik

Senior career*
Years	Team	Apps	(Gls)
1988–1994	Spartak Nalchik	143	(51)
1995	Spartak-Alania	2	(0)
1995–1996	Spartak Nalchik	40	(22)
2002	Kavkazkabel	35	(9)

Managerial career
- 2004: Spartak-2 Nalchik
- 2005: Vladikavkaz
- 2015–2018: Kubanskaya Korona Shevchenko
- 2022–2023: Akhmat Grozny (assistant)
- 2024–: Kuban Krasnodar (assistant)
- * Club domestic league appearances and goals

Aslan Akhmedovich Goplachev (Russian: Аслан Ахмедович Гоплачев; born 26 December 1970) is a Russian professional football coach and a former player. He is an assistant manager with Kuban Krasnodar.

== Honours ==
- Russian Premier League champion: 1995.
- Russian Second Division Zone West top scorer: 1994 (29 goals).
