= Yevgeni Toloknov =

Russian footballer

Personal information
- Full name: Yevgeni Nikolayevich Toloknov
- Date of birth: 28 January 1978 (age 48)
- Place of birth: Moscow, Russian SFSR
- Height: 1.82 m (5 ft 11 1/2 in)
- Position: Midfielder

Youth career
- FC Spartak Moscow

Senior career*
Years	Team	Apps	(Gls)
1995–1996	FC Spartak Moscow	1	(0)
1995–1996	→ FC Spartak-d Moscow	33	(2)
1999–2000	FC Spartak Moscow	0	(0)
1999–2000	→ FC Spartak-d Moscow	51	(5)
2001	FC Oryol	14	(0)
- * Club domestic league appearances and goals

Yevgeni Nikolayevich Toloknov (Russian: Евгений Николаевич Толокнов; born 28 January 1978) is a former Russian professional footballer.

== Club career ==
He made his professional debut in the Russian Third Division in 1995 for FC Spartak-d Moscow.

== Honours ==
- Russian Premier League champion: 1996.
