= Yuri Kuznetsov (footballer, born 1974) =

Russian footballer

Personal information
- Full name: Yuri Anatolyevich Kuznetsov
- Date of birth: 25 January 1974 (age 52)
- Place of birth: Angarsk, Irkutsk Oblast, Russian SFSR
- Height: 1.85 m (6 ft 1 in)
- Position: Midfielder

Senior career*
Years	Team	Apps	(Gls)
1992–1994	Angara Angarsk	71	(38)
1995–1999	Dynamo Moscow	48	(13)
2000	Shinnik Yaroslavl	22	(3)
2001	Gomel	22	(8)
2002	Metallurg Krasnoyarsk	9	(1)
2003–2004	Arsenal Tula	32	(5)
2004	Gomel	6	(0)
2005	Zvezda Irkutsk	21	(4)
2006	Reutov	8	(1)
- * Club domestic league appearances and goals

Yuri Anatolyevich Kuznetsov (Russian: Юрий Анатольевич Кузнецов; born 25 January 1974) is a former Russian professional footballer.

== Club career ==
He made his professional debut in the Russian Second Division in 1992 for FC Aleks Angarsk.

== Honours ==
- Russian Premier League bronze: 1997.
- Russian Cup finalist: 1997.

== European club competitions ==
With FC Dynamo Moscow.

- 1995–96 UEFA Cup Winners' Cup: 5 games, 1 goal.
- 1996–97 UEFA Cup: 3 games.
