= Igor Gorelov =

Russian footballer and coach

Personal information
- Full name: Igor Yuryevich Gorelov
- Date of birth: 8 March 1969 (age 57)
- Height: 1.80 m (5 ft 11 in)
- Positions: Defender; forward

Team information
- Current team: FC Lokomotiv-RPM Nizhny Novgorod (manager)

Youth career
- DYuSSh-8 Gorky

Senior career*
Years	Team	Apps	(Gls)
1986	FC Khimik Dzerzhinsk	1	(0)
1987	FC Lokomotiv Gorky	19	(0)
1990	FC Znamya Arzamas	18	(5)
1990–1993	FC Lokomotiv Nizhny Novgorod	90	(27)
1994–1995	FC Spartak Vladikavkaz	30	(1)
1995	FC Dynamo-Gazovik Tyumen	5	(0)
1995	FC Torpedo-Viktoria Nizhny Novgorod (amateur)		
1996–1997	FC Zhemchuzhina Sochi	35	(0)
1998	FC Kuban Krasnodar	20	(2)
1999	FC Lokomotiv Nizhny Novgorod	15	(0)
2000	FC Zhemchuzhina Sochi	31	(0)
2001	FC Lokomotiv Nizhny Novgorod	2	(1)
2002	FC Lokomotiv Nizhny Novgorod (amateur)		

Managerial career
- 2004–2005: FC Lokomotiv-NN Nizhny Novgorod (assistant)
- 2018–: FC Lokomotiv-RPM Nizhny Novgorod
- * Club domestic league appearances and goals

Igor Yuryevich Gorelov (Russian: Игорь Юрьевич Горе́лов; born 8 March 1969) is a Russian professional football coach and a former player. He is the manager of Russian Amateur Football League club FC Lokomotiv-RPM Nizhny Novgorod.

== Club career ==
He made his professional debut in the Soviet Second League in 1986 for FC Khimik Dzerzhinsk.

== Honours ==
- Russian Premier League champion: 1995.
