= Tamerlan Sikoyev =

Russian footballer

Personal information
- Full name: Tamerlan Sergeyevich Sikoyev
- Date of birth: 31 August 1976 (age 50)
- Place of birth: Ordzhonikidze, Russian SFSR
- Height: 1.80 m (5 ft 11 in)
- Position: Forward

Senior career*
Years	Team	Apps	(Gls)
1994	FC Spartak Vladikavkaz	0	(0)
1994	FC Avtodor Vladikavkaz	17	(1)
1995–1998	FC Alania Vladikavkaz	29	(2)
1998–1999	PFC Spartak Nalchik	43	(5)
2000–2003	FC Alania Vladikavkaz	39	(1)
2004	FC Volgar-Gazprom Astrakhan	10	(5)
2005	FC Mashuk-KMV Pyatigorsk	18	(2)
2007	FC Avtodor Vladikavkaz	12	(2)

International career
1995–1996	Russia U21	5	(0)
- * Club domestic league appearances and goals

Tamerlan Sergeyevich Sikoyev (Russian: Тамерлан Серге́евич Сикоев; born 31 August 1976) is a Russian former professional footballer.

== Club career ==
He made his professional debut in the Russian First Division in 1994 for FC Avtodor Vladikavkaz. He played one game in the UEFA Cup 1997–98 for FC Alania Vladikavkaz.

== Honours ==
- Russian Premier League champion: 1995.
- Russian Premier League runner-up: 1996.
