= Valery Yesipov =

Russian footballer

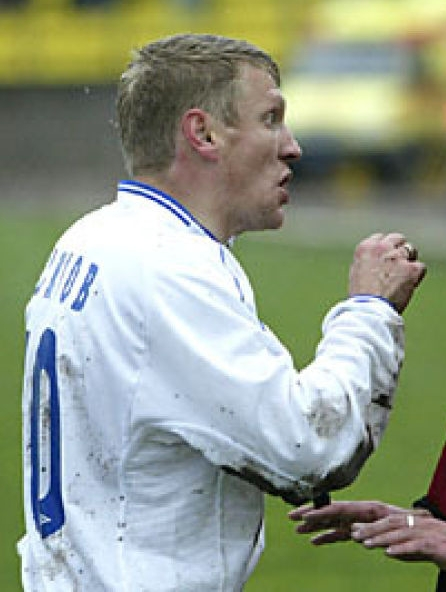

Personal information
- Full name: Valery Vyacheslavovich Yesipov
- Date of birth: 4 October 1971 (age 55)
- Place of birth: Shchigry, Soviet Union
- Height: 1.68 m (5 ft 6 in)
- Positions: Midfielder; forward

Youth career
- Shchigry Plant

Senior career*
Years	Team	Apps	(Gls)
1987	Schyotmash Kursk		
1988–1991	Avangard Kursk	110	(27)
1991–1992	Fakel Voronezh	10	(3)
1992	Dynamo Kyiv	6	(0)
1993–2004	Rotor Volgograd	349	(83)
2005–2007	Saturn Ramenskoye	37	(4)
Total		512	(117)

International career
1993–1994	Russia U21	11	(3)
1994–2003	Russia	5	(0)

Managerial career
- 2008–2010: Avangard Kursk
- 2010–2011: Rotor Volgograd (assistant)
- 2012–2013: Sever Murmansk
- 2015–2016: Tambov
- 2017: Rotor Volgograd
- 2020–2021: Favorite-VD-Kafa Feodosia
- 2021: Salyut Belgorod
- 2021: Rubin Yalta
- 2022: Znamya Truda Orekhovo-Zuyevo
- 2023: Kyzyltash Bakhchisaray
- * Club domestic league appearances and goals

Valery Vyacheslavovich Yesipov (Russian: Валерий Вячеславович Есипов; born 4 October 1971) is a Russian football manager and a former player.

Once, Yesipov held the record for most appearances in the Russian Premier League (390), he has been since overtaken by several players. Yesipov has also been capped five times for the Russia national football team.

== Honours ==
- 1993 – Russian Top Division runner-up
- 1996 – Russian Top Division, third position
- 1997 – Russian Top Division runner-up
- 1997 – best right midfielder according to Sport-Express
- 1998 – best right midfielder according to Sport-Express
- Russian Second Division, Zone Center best manager: 2009.
- Russian Professional Football League Zone Center Best Manager: 2015–16.
