= Andrei Smetanin =

Russian footballer (born 1969)

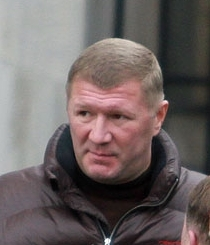

Personal information
- Full name: Andrei Ruslanovich Smetanin
- Date of birth: 21 June 1969 (age 57)
- Place of birth: Perm, Russian SFSR
- Height: 1.95 m (6 ft 5 in)
- Position: Goalkeeper

Youth career
- Zvezda Perm

Senior career*
Years	Team	Apps	(Gls)
1986–1987	Zvezda Perm	20	(0)
1987–1997	Dynamo Moscow	129	(0)
1998–2001	Spartak Moscow	14	(0)
2001–2002	Sokol Saratov	19	(0)
2002	Volgar-Gazprom Astrakhan	14	(0)
2003	Titan Moscow	13	(0)
2003–2004	Ural Yekaterinburg	47	(0)
2005	Gazovik-Gazprom Izhevsk	25	(0)
2006	Lobnya-Alla Lobnya	18	(0)

Managerial career
- 2012–2015: Yunost Moskvy-Spartak-2 (youth school)
- 2017: Ararat Moscow (GK coach)
- * Club domestic league appearances and goals

Andrei Ruslanovich Smetanin (Russian: Андрей Русланович Сметанин; born 21 June 1969) is a Russian professional football coach and a former player.

== Club career ==
He made his debut in the Soviet Top League in 1990 for FC Dynamo Moscow.

== Post-playing career ==
From 2007 to 2010 he worked as the general director for the futsal team MFC Dynamo-2 Moscow.

== Honours ==
- Russian Premier League champion: 1998, 1999, 2000.
- Russian Premier League runner-up: 1994.
- Russian Premier League bronze: 1992, 1993, 1997.
- Soviet Top League bronze: 1990.
- Russian Cup winner: 1995.
- Russian Cup finalist: 1997.
- Russian Second Division Zone Ural/Povolzhye best goalkeeper: 2004.

== European club competitions ==
- UEFA Cup 1991–92 with FC Dynamo Moscow: 6 games.
- UEFA Cup 1993–94 with FC Dynamo Moscow: 1 game.
- UEFA Cup 1994–95 with FC Dynamo Moscow: 4 games.
- UEFA Cup Winners' Cup 1995–96 with FC Dynamo Moscow: 4 games.
- UEFA Cup 1996–97 with FC Dynamo Moscow: 3 games.
- UEFA Cup 1999–2000 with FC Spartak Moscow: 1 game.
