= Sergei Khramtsov =

Russian footballer

Personal information
- Full name: Sergei Nikolayevich Khramtsov
- Date of birth: 28 February 1977 (age 49)
- Height: 1.83 m (6 ft 0 in)
- Positions: Defender; midfielder

Senior career*
Years	Team	Apps	(Gls)
1995	FC Izumrud Timashyovsk		
1996	FC Kuban Krasnodar	0	(0)
1996	FC Rotor Volgograd	1	(0)
1996–1997	FC Rotor-d Volgograd	34	(1)
1998	FC Rotor Kamyshin	15	(2)
1998–1999	FC Rotor-2 Volgograd	34	(1)
2000	FC Svetotekhnika Saransk	35	(1)
2001	FC Rotor Volgograd	0	(0)
2001–2003	FC Svetotekhnika Saransk	72	(2)
2004	FC Lukoil Chelyabinsk	21	(0)
2005	FC Lokomotiv-NN Nizhny Novgorod	30	(0)
2006	FC Elista	14	(0)
2006	FC Rotor Volgograd	5	(0)
- * Club domestic league appearances and goals

Sergei Nikolayevich Khramtsov (Russian: Серге́й Николаевич Храмцов; born 28 February 1977) is a Russian former professional footballer.

== Club career ==
He made his professional debut in the Russian Premier League in 1996 for FC Rotor Volgograd.

== Honours ==
- Russian Premier League bronze: 1996.
