= Ihor Korniyets =

Ukrainian footballer (born 1967)

Personal information
- Full name: Ihor Vasylyovych Korniyets
- Date of birth: 14 July 1967 (age 59)
- Place of birth: Kyiv, Ukrainian SSR
- Height: 1.77 m (5 ft 10 in)
- Positions: Defender; midfielder

Youth career
- 1984–1985: Dynamo Kyiv

Senior career*
Years	Team	Apps	(Gls)
1985–1987	Dynamo Irpen	81	(4)
1987–1989	Dynamo Kyiv	13	(0)
1989–1990	Metalurh Zaporizhya	38	(0)
1991	Shakhtar Donetsk	29	(0)
1992–1993	Lech Poznań	24	(0)
1993–1995	Chornomorets Odesa	44	(1)
1995–1997	Rotor Volgograd	74	(0)
1997–1998	Arsenal Tula	48	(2)
2000–2001	Signal Odesa		
2002–2003	Olimpiya AES Yuzhnoukrainsk	17	(0)

Managerial career
- 2001: Signal Odesa
- 2002: Olimpia AES Yuzhnoukrainsk (assistant)
- 2003–2004: Metalist-2 Kharkiv
- 2004: Metalist Kharkiv (assistant)
- 2005–2010: Kharkiv (assistant)
- 2013–2014: Real Pharma Ovidiopol
- * Club domestic league appearances and goals

Ihor Vasylyovych Korniyets (Ukrainian: Ігор Васильович Корнієць; Russian: Игорь Васильевич Корниец; born 14 July 1967) is a Ukrainian professional football coach and a former player.

== Club career ==
He made his professional debut in the Soviet Top League in 1988 for Dynamo Kyiv.

== Honours ==
Lech Poznań

- Ekstraklasa: 1991–92, 1992–93
- Polish Super Cup: 1992

Chornomorets Odesa

- Ukrainian Cup: 1993–94
