= Vasili Kulkov =

Russian footballer and manager (1966–2020)

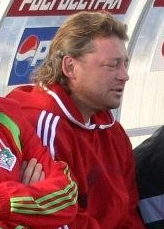
- Kulkov in 2007

Personal information
- Full name: Vasili Sergeyevich Kulkov
- Date of birth: 11 June 1966
- Place of birth: Moscow, Soviet Union
- Date of death: 10 October 2020 (aged 54)
- Height: 1.80 m (5 ft 11 in)
- Positions: Central defender; defensive midfielder

Youth career
- Dynamo Moscow

Senior career*
Years	Team	Apps	(Gls)
1984–1985	Dynamo Kashira	52	(7)
1986	Spartak Moscow (reserves)	12	(2)
1986–1987	Krasnaya Presnya	51	(11)
1988	Spartak Ordzhonikidze	42	(3)
1989–1991	Spartak Moscow	75	(4)
1991–1994	Benfica	53	(6)
1994–1995	Porto	24	(2)
1995–1997	Spartak Moscow	18	(0)
1996	→ Millwall (loan)	6	(0)
1997–1998	Zenit St. Petersburg	41	(2)
1999	Krylia Sovetov	7	(0)
1999–2000	Alverca	19	(0)
2001	Shatura		
Total		400	(37)

International career
1989–1991	USSR	20	(0)
1992	CIS	1	(0)
1992–1995	Russia	21	(5)

Managerial career
- 2003: Marítimo (assistant)
- 2003: FC Khimki (assistant)
- 2005: Tom Tomsk (assistant)
- 2007: Lokomotiv Moscow (assistant)
- 2009–2013: Spartak Moscow (reserves assistant)
- * Club domestic league appearances and goals

Vasili Sergeyevich Kulkov (Василий Серге́евич Кульков; 11 June 1966 – 10 October 2020) was a Russian footballer.

Either a central defender or defensive midfielder, he was best known for his time with Spartak Moscow in Russia, and Benfica and Porto in Portugal. After retirement from playing, he worked as an assistant in various coaching and managerial crews.

== Club career ==
Kulkov was born in Moscow, Soviet Union. From 1984 until the end of his career he played for a host of clubs in Russia, coming to prominence most notably with hometown's Spartak Moscow, from where he left in 1991 for a Portuguese league stint with Benfica (where he played with countrymen Aleksandr Mostovoi and Sergei Yuran). At Benfica, Kulkov scored two great goals in the 1994 Cup Winners Cup game in Leverkusen to pull Benfica into semi finals.

In the 1994–95 season, both Kulkov and Yuran joined Porto, being very important figures in the league's conquest. Aged 29, the former returned to Spartak, only to move shortly after to Millwall in the English second division, where he failed to adjust immensely, appearing very rarely in a six-month loan.

After two years with Zenit Saint Petersburg and one at Krylia Sovetov Samara, Kulkov returned to Portugal, joining Alverca – Benfica's feeder club but also in the top flight. He closed out his career with amateurs FC Shatura, aged 35.

== International career ==
Kulkov made his debut for the Soviet Union on 26 April 1989, in a 1990 FIFA World Cup qualifier against East Germany. Despite playing regularly for the national team for several years, he did not participate in any major tournament: in 1990, he was not selected for the final stages in Italy, and missed UEFA Euro 1992 (with CIS) and 1996 due to injury.

Before the 1994 FIFA World Cup, several Russia players, including Kulkov, signed a letter demanding that team manager Pavel Sadyrin resign. The coach did not and the player refused to participate.

== Coaching career ==
Following his retirement from playing, Kulkov had some spells in coaching, notably assisting countryman Anatoliy Byshovets at Marítimo in 2003. Six years later he moved to Spartak Moscow's reserves, in the same capacity.

== Death ==
Diagnosed with esophageal cancer in 2019, he died on 10 October 2020, aged 54, from COVID-19.

== Honours ==
Spartak Moscow

- Soviet Top League: 1989
- Russian Top League: 1997

Benfica

- Primeira Liga: 1993–94
- Taça de Portugal: 1992–93

Porto

- Primeira Liga: 1994–95
