= Sergei Ilyushin (footballer) =

Russian footballer

Personal information
- Full name: Sergei Vladimirovich Ilyushin
- Date of birth: 27 March 1975 (age 51)
- Place of birth: Volzhsky, Russian SFSR
- Height: 1.78 m (5 ft 10 in)
- Positions: Forward; midfielder

Youth career
- SDYuSShOR-4 Volzhsky

Senior career*
Years	Team	Apps	(Gls)
1992–1994	FC Torpedo Volzhsky	70	(12)
1995–1997	FC Rotor Volgograd	37	(6)
1997–1998	FC Arsenal Tula	18	(2)
1999	FC Zhenis	2	(1)
2000	FC Balakovo	33	(6)
2001–2002	FC Svetotekhnika Saransk	66	(12)
2003	FC Lukoil Chelyabinsk	15	(2)
2003–2005	FC Torpedo Volzhsky	55	(8)

International career
1995–1996	Russia U-21	5	(0)
- * Club domestic league appearances and goals

Sergei Vladimirovich Ilyushin (Russian: Серге́й Владимирович Илюшин; born 27 March 1975) is a Russian former professional footballer.

== Club career ==
He made his professional debut in the Russian First Division in 2002 for FC Torpedo Volzhsky.

== Honours ==
- Russian Premier League runner-up: 1997.
- Russian Premier League bronze: 1996.

== European club competitions ==
With FC Rotor Volgograd.

- UEFA Cup 1995–96: 3 games.
- UEFA Intertoto Cup 1996: 3 games.
