= Aleksandr Shmarko =

Soviet and Russian footballer

Personal information
- Full name: Aleksandr Nikolayevich Shmarko
- Date of birth: 12 March 1969 (age 57)
- Place of birth: Maykop, Russian SFSR
- Position: Defender

Team information
- Current team: FC Leningradets Leningrad Oblast (assistant manager)

Senior career*
Years	Team	Apps	(Gls)
1986–1987	FC Lokomotiv Mineralnye Vody	57	(0)
1989	FC Khimik Belorechensk	42	(6)
1990	FC Kuban Krasnodar	16	(0)
1991	FC Dynamo Stavropol	25	(0)
1991–1999	FC Rotor Volgograd	202	(3)
1994–1999	→ FC Rotor-d Volgograd	3	(0)
2000	FC Shakhtar Donetsk	12	(0)
2000	→ FC Shakhtar-2 Donetsk	12	(2)
2001–2002	FC Rostselmash	48	(2)
2003–2005	FC Terek Grozny	77	(1)
2006	FC Spartak Nizhny Novgorod	15	(0)
2006	FC Spartak Kostroma	13	(1)

International career
1998	Russia	2	(0)

Managerial career
- 2016–2017: FC Arsenal Tula (assistant)
- 2021–2024: FC Leningradets Leningrad Oblast (assistant)
- 2024: FC Leningradets Leningrad Oblast (caretaker)
- 2024–2025: FC Leningradets Leningrad Oblast (assistant)
- 2025: FC Leningradets Leningrad Oblast (caretaker)
- 2025–: FC Leningradets Leningrad Oblast (assistant)
- * Club domestic league appearances and goals

Aleksandr Nikolayevich Shmarko (Russian: Александр Николаевич Шмарко; born 12 March 1969) is a Russian football coach and a former player. He is an assistant coach of FC Leningradets Leningrad Oblast.

== Honours ==
- Russian Premier League runner-up: 1993, 1997.
- Russian Premier League bronze: 1996.
- Ukrainian Premier League runner-up: 2000.
- Russian Cup winner: 2004.
- Top 33 players year-end list: 1993, 1997, 1998.

== International career ==
Shmarko made his debut for Russia on 19 August 1998 in a friendly against Sweden.
