= Aleksandr Yeshchenko =

Russian footballer

Personal information
- Full name: Aleksandr Alekseyevich Yeshchenko
- Date of birth: 5 May 1970 (age 56)
- Place of birth: Lutsk, Ukrainian SSR
- Height: 1.80 m (5 ft 11 in)
- Positions: Defender; midfielder

Senior career*
Years	Team	Apps	(Gls)
1987–1988	FC Torpedo Lutsk	33	(1)
1989	SKA Karpaty Lviv	9	(1)
1990	FC SKA Rostov-on-Don	15	(0)
1991	FC Rostselmash Rostov-on-Don	41	(0)
1992	FC Dynamo Kyiv	0	(0)
1992–1993	FC Rotor Volgograd	32	(0)
1994	Belenenses		
1994	FC Rotor Volgograd	14	(0)
1995	FC Rostselmash Rostov-on-Don	15	(0)
1995–1996	FC Volyn Lutsk	8	(0)
1995–1996	FC Rotor Volgograd	11	(0)
1996	FC Zhemchuzhina Sochi	20	(1)
1997	FC Uralan Elista	1	(0)
1997–1999	FC Zhemchuzhina Sochi	55	(4)
1999	FC Arsenal Tula	15	(0)
2000	FC Torpedo-ZIL Moscow	3	(0)
2000	FC Zhemchuzhina Sochi	17	(1)
2001	FC Kuzbass-Dynamo Kemerovo	29	(0)
2002	FC Chernomorets Novorossiysk	22	(0)
2003	FC Metallurg-Kuzbass Novokuznetsk	29	(0)
2004	FC Dynamo Bryansk	18	(0)
2004	FC Lisma-Mordoviya Saransk	6	(0)
2005	FC Baltika Kaliningrad	15	(0)
- * Club domestic league appearances and goals

Aleksandr Alekseyevich Yeshchenko (Russian: Александр Алексеевич Ещенко; born 5 May 1970) is a former Russian professional footballer.

== Club career ==
He made his professional debut in the Soviet Second League in 1987 for FC Torpedo Lutsk.

== Honours ==
- Russian Premier League runner-up: 1993.
- Russian Premier League bronze: 1996.
- Russian Cup finalist: 1995.

== European club competitions ==
With FC Rotor Volgograd.

- UEFA Cup 1994–95: 2 games.
- UEFA Cup 1995–96: 4 games.

== Personal life ==
His father Oleksiy Yeshchenko was a football manager, coaching FC Volyn Lutsk, his son Oleg Yeshchenko is a footballer.
