= Aleksandr Zernov =

Russian footballer

Personal information
- Full name: Aleksandr Sergeyevich Zernov
- Date of birth: 21 July 1974 (age 52)
- Place of birth: Ivanovo, Russian SFSR
- Height: 1.78 m (5 ft 10 in)
- Position: Forward

Youth career
- FC Tekstilshchik Ivanovo

Senior career*
Years	Team	Apps	(Gls)
1991–1995	FC Tekstilshchik Ivanovo	132	(48)
1996–2002	FC Rotor Volgograd	160	(27)
2003	FC Terek Grozny	33	(8)
2004–2006	FC Sodovik Sterlitamak	95	(39)
2007	FC Baltika Kaliningrad	25	(8)
2007–2009	FC Volga Nizhny Novgorod	52	(8)
2010	FC Tekstilshchik Ivanovo	28	(2)

Managerial career
- 2012–2013: FC Vologda (assistant)
- * Club domestic league appearances and goals

Aleksandr Sergeyevich Zernov (Russian: Александр Серге́евич Зернов; born 21 July 1974) is a Russian former professional footballer and coach.

== Career ==
He made his debut in the Russian Premier League in 1996 for FC Rotor Volgograd.

== Honours ==
- Russian Premier League runner-up: 1997.
- Russian Premier League bronze: 1996.

== European competition history ==
- UEFA Cup 1995–96 with FC Rotor Volgograd: 4 games.
- UEFA Intertoto Cup 1996 with FC Rotor Volgograd: 8 games, 3 goals.
- UEFA Cup 1997–98 with FC Rotor Volgograd: 6 games, 1 goal.
- UEFA Cup 1998–99 with FC Rotor Volgograd: 1 game, 1 goal.
