= Aleksandr Berketov =

Russian footballer and coach (1975–2022)

Personal information
- Full name: Aleksandr Nikolayevich Berketov
- Date of birth: 24 December 1975
- Place of birth: Volgograd, Russian SFSR, USSR
- Date of death: 1 June 2022 (aged 46)
- Place of death: Moscow, Russia
- Height: 1.81 m (5 ft 11 in)
- Positions: Defender; midfielder

Senior career*
Years	Team	Apps	(Gls)
1992	Tekstilshchik-d Kamyshin	21	(1)
1993–2001	Rotor Volgograd	189	(16)
2001–2003	CSKA Moscow	17	(0)

International career
1994–1996	Russia U-21	27	(4)

Managerial career
- 2007–2011: Rostov (scout)
- 2011–2012: Khimki (assistant)
- 2012–2013: Dinamo Minsk (assistant)
- 2013–2014: Rotor Volgograd (director of sports)
- 2014–2015: Rotor Volgograd (assistant)
- 2015: Luch-Energiya Vladivostok (assistant)
- 2015–2017: Zenit-2 Saint Petersburg (assistant)
- * Club domestic league appearances and goals

Aleksandr Nikolayevich Berketov (Russian: Александр Николаевич Беркетов; 24 December 1975 – 1 June 2022) was a Russian professional football player and coach.

== Club career ==
Berketov made his professional debut in the Russian Second Division in 1992 for Tekstilshchik-d Kamyshin. He played one game for the main Tekstilshchik Kamyshin squad in the Russian Cup.

== Honours ==
Rotor Volgograd

- Russian Premier League runner-up: 1997; third place 1996
- Russian Cup finalist: 1995

CSKA Moscow

- Russian Premier League runner-up: 2002
- Russian Cup: 2002

Individual

- Top 33 year-end best players list: 1996, 1997

== European club competitions ==
- UEFA Cup 1994–95 with FC Rotor Volgograd: 1 game.
- UEFA Cup 1995–96 with FC Rotor Volgograd: 3 games.
- UEFA Intertoto Cup 1996 with FC Rotor Volgograd: 5 games, 1 goal.
- UEFA Cup 1997–98 with FC Rotor Volgograd: 6 games, 2 goals.
- UEFA Cup 1998–99 with FC Rotor Volgograd: 2 games.
- UEFA Cup 2002–03 with PFC CSKA Moscow: 1 game.
