= Oleg Teryokhin =

Russian footballer

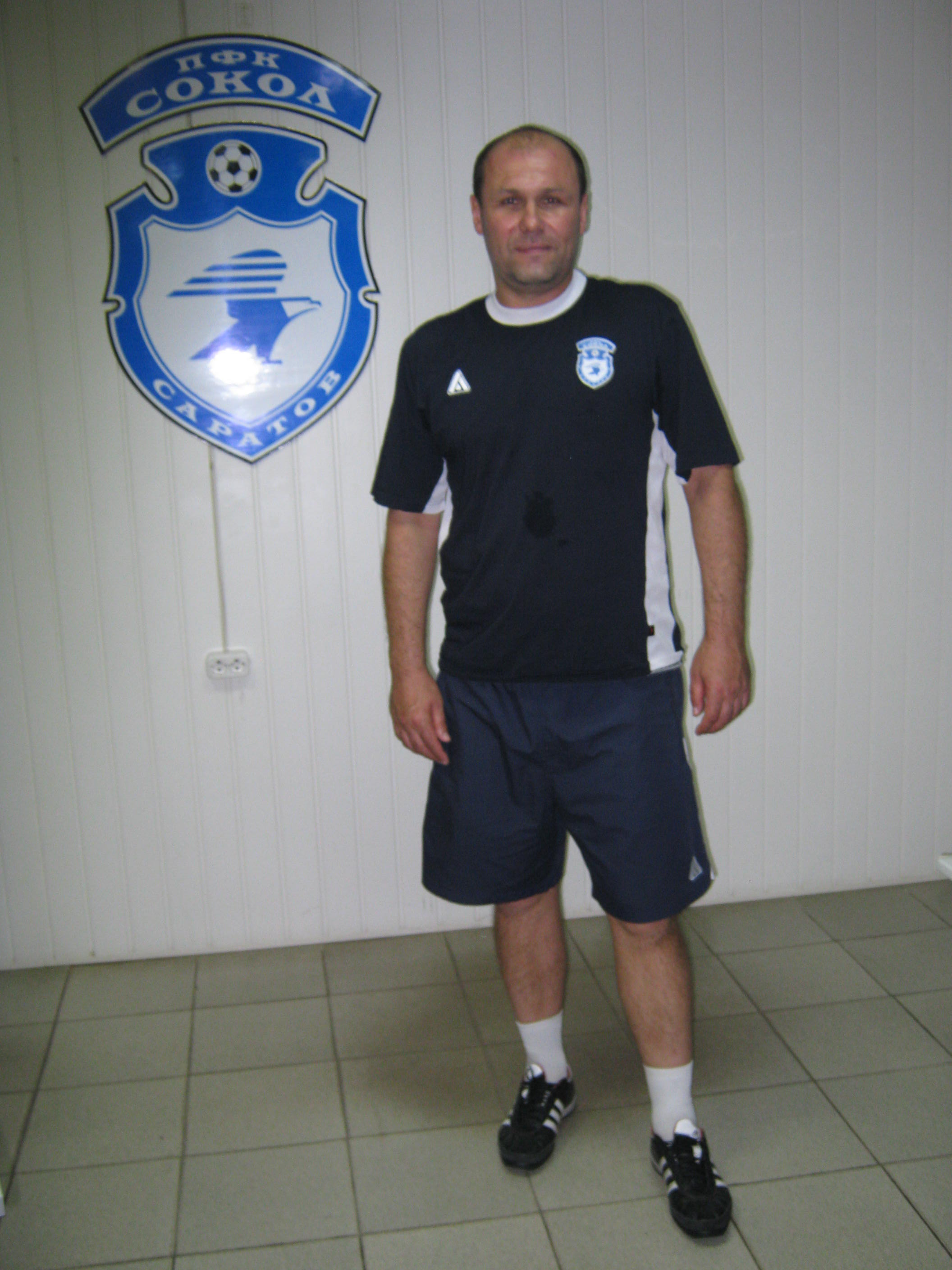

Personal information
- Full name: Oleg Ivanovich Teryokhin
- Date of birth: 12 August 1970 (age 56)
- Place of birth: Engels, Russian SFSR
- Height: 1.83 m (6 ft 0 in)
- Position: Striker

Senior career*
Years	Team	Apps	(Gls)
1987	FC Avtomobilist Engels		
1989–1990	FC Novator Mariupol		
1990–1994	FC Sokol Saratov	129	(80)
1995–1999	FC Dynamo Moscow	146	(67)
2000	FC Lokomotiv Moscow	21	(8)
2001–2002	FC Kuban Krasnodar	46	(18)
2002–2003	FC Chernomorets Novorossiysk	42	(13)
2004–2005	FC Terek Grozny	42	(6)
2006	FC Salyut-Energia Belgorod	34	(11)
2007	FC Stavros Vityazevo		

International career
1998	Russia	1	(0)

Managerial career
- 2007–2010: FC Kuban Krasnodar (scout)
- 2011: FC Terek Grozny (scout)
- 2011–2012: FC Terek Grozny (assistant)
- 2012–2015: FC Sokol Saratov (assistant)
- 2017–2018: FC Afips Afipsky (youth development director)
- 2023: FC Kuban-Holding Pavlovskaya
- * Club domestic league appearances and goals

Oleg Ivanovich Teryokhin (Russian: Олег Иванович Терёхин; born 12 August 1970 ) is a Russian football coach and a former player.

== Honours ==
- Russian Premier League runner-up: 2000.
- Russian Premier League bronze: 1997.
- Russian Cup winner: 2000, 2001, 2004.
- All-time top scorer for FC Dynamo Moscow in the Russian Premier League: 67 goals.
- Top 33 players year-end list: 1997, 1998, 1999.
- The only player to score at least 100 goals in both Russian Premier League and Russian First Division.
- Russian First League Zone Center top scorer: 1992 (27 goals).

== International career ==
Teryokhin played his only game for Russia on 23 September 1998 in a friendly against Spain.
