= Vladimir Niederhaus =

Kazakhstani footballer (born 1967)

Personal information
- Full name: Vladimir Viktorovich Niederhaus
- Date of birth: 13 August 1967 (age 59)
- Place of birth: Kokchetav, Kazakh SSR, Soviet Union
- Height: 1.75 m (5 ft 9 in)
- Position: Forward

Senior career*
Years	Team	Apps	(Gls)
1984–1985	Torpedo Kokshetau	47	(3)
1990	Spartak Kokshetau	28	(17)
1991	Kokshetau	5	(2)
1991–1992	Kairat Almaty	40	(20)
1992–1997	Rotor Volgograd	159	(68)
1997–1998	Maccabi Haifa	13	(3)
1998–1999	Maccabi Herzliya	14	(3)
1999	Rotor Volgograd	9	(0)
2000	Zhenis Astana	27	(15)
2001–2002	Preußen Münster	5	(0)
2002–2004	SC Weyhe	11	(8)

International career
1992–2000	Kazakhstan	4	(1)
1994	Russia	1	(0)

Managerial career
- 2005–2006: Rotor Volgograd (technical director)
- 2006: Rotor Volgograd (director)
- 2006: Rotor Volgograd (general director)
- 2007–2008: Shakhter Karagandy (director of sports)
- 2010: Lokomotiv Astana (director of sports)
- 2010–2011: Shakhter Karagandy (director of sports)
- 2015–2016: Shakhter Karagandy (executive director)
- 2017–2018: Tobol (director of sports)
- 2018–2019: Tobol (technical director)
- 2023: Tobol (director of sports)
- * Club domestic league appearances and goals

Vladimir Viktorovich Niederhaus (Russian: Владимир Викторович Нидергаус; born 13 August 1967) is a Kazakh football official and a former player. He played international football for both Kazakhstan and Russia.

== Post-playing career ==
After retirement, Niederhaus held various administrative positions is his former club Rotor Volgograd and several Kazakh clubs. Between 2012 and 2015 he worked as national teams dept director in Football Federation of Kazakhstan.

=== Match fixing scandal ===
On 19 September 2008, Shakhter Karagandy and FC Vostok were disqualified from the Kazakhstan Premier League for playing a fixed match, club coaches and management involved were banned from football for 60 months, including Niederhaus.
