= 1997–98 Russian Cup =

Tournament details
- Country: Russia

Final positions
- Champions: Spartak Moscow
- Runners-up: Lokomotiv Moscow

Tournament statistics
- Matches played: 157
- Goals scored: 501 (3.19 per match)

The 1997–98 Russian Cup was the sixth season of the Russian football knockout tournament since the dissolution of Soviet Union.

== First round ==
Team 1	Score	Team 2
2 May 1997
Samotlor-XXI Nizhnevartovsk	3–0	Irtysh Tobolsk
Dynamo Barnaul	3–1	Torpedo Rubtsovsk
Dynamo Omsk	2–0	Chkalovets Novosibirsk
FC Mezhdurechensk	0–1	Metallurg-Zapsib Novokuznetsk
Tom Tomsk	4–1	Kuzbass Kemerovo
Metallurg Krasnoyarsk	3–2 (a.e.t.)	Viktoriya Nazarovo
Energetik Uren	2–0	Khimik Dzerzhinsk
4 May 1997
Progress Zelenodolsk	0–0 (a.e.t.) (5–3 p)	Torpedo Pavlovo
Druzhba Yoshkar-Ola	0–3	Rubin Kazan
Metallurg Vyksa	2–1	Torpedo Arzamas
Torpedo-Viktoriya Nizhny Novgorod	2–0	Svetotekhnika Saransk
Zenit Penza	1–0	Biokhimik-Mordovia Saransk
Neftyanik Bugulma	2–1	Neftyanik Pokhvistnevo
Gazovik Orenburg	0–0 (a.e.t.) (2–4 p)	Magnitka Magnitogorsk
Metiznik Magnitogorsk	1–4	Nosta Novotroitsk
Volga Ulyanovsk	1–0	Sodovik Sterlitamak
Salyut Saratov	1–0	Iskra Engels
Dynamo-Imamat Makhachkala	w/o	FC Derbent
Trubnik Kamensk-Uralsky	2–0	Dynamo Perm
Elektron Vyatskiye Polyany	1–0	Zenit Izhevsk
Volochanin Vyshny Volochyok	2–1 (a.e.t.)	FC Gatchina
Spartak Kostroma	0–6	Dynamo Vologda
Neftyanik Yaroslavl	2–0	Volga Tver
5 May 1997
Chertanovo Moscow	3–4	Asmaral Moscow
Roda Moscow	5–1	Monolit Moscow
Sportakademklub Moscow	0–3	Spartak-Orekhovo
Volga Balakovo	0–2	Torpedo-ZIL Moscow

== Second round ==
Team 1	Score	Team 2
15 May 1997
Luch Tula	0–4	FC MChS-Selyatino
Torgmash Lyubertsy	2–1	Fabus Bronnitsy
Kosmos Dolgoprudny	6–0	Krasnogvardeyets Moscow
Titan Reutov	1–1 (a.e.t.) (1–4 p)	Spartak Shchyolkovo
Olimp Kislovodsk	1–3 (a.e.t.)	Druzhba Maykop
Beshtau Lermontov	0–2	Energiya Pyatigorsk
Lokomotiv Mineralnye Vody	1–6	Torpedo Armavir
Torpedo Vladimir	1–2	Tekstilshchik Ivanovo
FC Kolomna	1–2	Saturn Ramenskoye
Lokomotiv Yelets	3–2	Lokomotiv Liski
FC Oryol	3–1	Don Novomoskovsk
Spartak Tambov	0–1	Metallurg Lipetsk
Avangard Kursk	0–1	Salyut-YuKOS Belgorod
Mosenergo Moscow	4–1	Avtomobilist Noginsk
Stroitel Morshansk	2–1	Spartak Ryazan
Spartak Nalchik	4–2	Nart Cherkessk
Kavkazkabel Prokhladny	2–1 (a.e.t.)	Angusht Nazran
FC Mozdok	0–0 (a.e.t.) (0–3 p)	Avtodor Vladikavkaz
Nart Nartkala	0–2	Avtozapchast Baksan
Energetik Uren	1–4	Sokol-PZhD Saratov
Rubin Kazan	3–1	Progress Zelenodolsk
Torpedo-Viktoriya Nizhny Novgorod	2–2 (a.e.t.) (2–3 p)	Metallurg Vyksa
Zenit Penza	3–1 (a.e.t.)	Energiya Kamyshin
Asmaral Moscow	3–4	Arsenal Tula
Spartak-Orekhovo	1–2	Roda Moscow
Spartak-Bratskiy Yuzhny	2–1	Torpedo Volzhsky
FC Volgodonsk	0–2	SKA Rostov-on-Don
Metallurg Krasny Sulin	3–1	Shakhtyor Shakhty
Torpedo Taganrog	w/o	Avangard-Kolos Taganrog
Niva Slavyansk-na-Kubani	3–1	Spartak Anapa
Kuban Slavyansk-na-Kubani	w/o	Dynamo-Zhemchuzhina-2 Sochi
Mashinostroitel Pskov	0–3	CSK VVS-Kristall Smolensk
Dynamo Bryansk	2–0	Industriya Borovsk
Lokomotiv Kaluga	2–0	Spartak Bryansk
Neftyanik Bugulma	3–2	Lada-Togliatti
Nosta Novotroitsk	5–0	Magnitka Magnitogorsk
UralAZ Miass	0–0 (a.e.t.) (2–4 p)	Sibir Kurgan
Volga Ulyanovsk	2–0	Lada Dimitrovgrad
Torpedo-ZIL Moscow	2–1	Salyut Saratov
Rotor-2 Mikhaylovka	1–0	Volgar-Gazprom Astrakhan
Dynamo-Imamat Makhachkala	0–4	Anzhi Makhachkala
Trubnik Kamensk-Uralsky	0–3	Uralmash Yekaterinburg
Elektron Vyatskiye Polyany	0–1	Amkar Perm
Energiya Chaykovsky	2–2 (a.e.t.) (4–2 p)	Gazovik-Gazprom Izhevsk
Uralets Nizhny Tagil	0–1	Neftekhimik Nizhnekamsk
Volochanin Vyshny Volochyok	2–2 (a.e.t.) (4–2 p)	Dynamo Saint Petersburg
Dynamo Vologda	3–0	Neftyanik Yaroslavl
16 May 1997
Samotlor-XXI Nizhnevartovsk	3–1	Irtysh Omsk
Dynamo Barnaul	4–0	Dynamo Omsk
Metallurg-Zapsib Novokuznetsk	1–0	Zarya Leninsk-Kuznetsky
Tom Tomsk	5–1	Metallurg Krasnoyarsk
Zvezda Irkutsk	4–2 (a.e.t.)	Angara Angarsk
Selenga Ulan-Ude	2–3	Lokomotiv Chita
Amur-Energiya Blagoveshchensk	0–2	SKA Khabarovsk
Okean Nakhodka	1–3	Luch Vladivostok

== Third round ==
Team 1	Score	Team 2
16 June 1997
FC MChS-Selyatino	3–1	Torgmash Lyubertsy
Spartak Shchyolkovo	1–2	Kosmos Dolgoprudny
Druzhba Maykop	1–0	Energiya Pyatigorsk
Torpedo Armavir	1–3	Dynamo Stavropol
Tekstilshchik Ivanovo	1–0	Saturn Ramenskoye
FC Oryol	3–0 (a.e.t.)	Lokomotiv Yelets
Metallurg Lipetsk	5–0	Salyut-YuKOS Belgorod
Stroitel Morshansk	1–2	Mosenergo Moscow
Spartak Nalchik	2–1	Kavkazkabel Prokhladny
Avtodor Vladikavkaz	1–2	Avtozapchast Baksan
Samotlor-XXI Nizhnevartovsk	2–1	Dynamo Barnaul
Metallurg-Zapsib Novokuznetsk	0–1	Tom Tomsk
Sokol-PZhD Saratov	0–2	Rubin Kazan
Metallurg Vyksa	1–1 (a.e.t.) (3–2 p)	Zenit Penza
Arsenal Tula	4–0	Roda Moscow
SKA Rostov-on-Don	2–0	Spartak-Bratskiy Yuzhny
Metallurg Krasny Sulin	2–1	Torpedo Taganrog
Niva Slavyansk-na-Kubani	1–2	Kuban Krasnodar
Kuban Slavyansk-na-Kubani	3–1 (a.e.t.)	Venets Gulkevichi
CSK VVS-Kristall Smolensk	5–3	Dynamo Bryansk
Lokomotiv Kaluga	0–4	Lokomotiv Saint Petersburg
Nosta Novotroitsk	5–1	Neftyanik Bugulma
Sibir Kurgan	0–2	Volga Ulyanovsk
Torpedo-ZIL Moscow	1–5	Uralan Elista
Anzhi Makhachkala	4–2	Rotor-2 Mikhaylovka
Uralmash Yekaterinburg	1–1 (a.e.t.) (5–3 p)	Amkar Perm
Neftekhimik Nizhnekamsk	4–0	Energiya Chaykovsky
Lokomotiv Chita	3–2 (a.e.t.)	Zvezda Irkutsk
SKA Khabarovsk	2–3	Luch Vladivostok
Dynamo Vologda	4–0	Volochanin Vyshny Volochyok

== Fourth round ==
Russian Premier League teams Fakel Voronezh and Shinnik Yaroslavl started at this stage.

Team 1	Score	Team 2
6 July 1997
FC MChS-Selyatino	1–0	Kosmos Dolgoprudny
Dynamo Stavropol	5–3	Druzhba Maykop
Tekstilschik Ivanovo	0–1	FC Oryol
Metallurg Lipetsk	1–0	Mosenergo Moscow
Avtozapchast Baksan	1–1 (a.e.t.) (4–3 p)	Spartak Nalchik
Tom Tomsk	2–1	Samotlor-XXI Nizhnevartovsk
Rubin Kazan	3–0	Metallurg Vyksa
SKA Rostov-on-Don	2–3	Metallurg Krasny Sulin
Kuban Slavyansk-na-Kubani	2–3	Kuban Krasnodar
Lokomotiv Saint Petersburg	1–2	CSK VVS-Kristall Smolensk
Volga Ulyanovsk	1–0	Nosta Novotroitsk
Uralan Elista	2–0	Anzhi Makhachkala
Neftekhimik Nizhnekamsk	5–0	Uralmash Yekaterinburg

6 July 1997	Arsenal Tula	2–0	Fakel Voronezh	Tula
	Fedin 53'; Kuzmichyov 83'			Stadium: Arsenal Stadium; Attendance: 7,000; Referee: Garyafi Zhafyarov (Moscow)

6 July 1997	Dynamo Vologda	0–1	Shinnik Yaroslavl	Vologda
			Leonchenko 72'	Stadium: Dynamo Stadium; Attendance: 6,000; Referee: Aleksandr Lapin (Ufa)

Team 1	Score	Team 2
21 July 1997
Luch Vladivostok	1–3 (a.e.t.)	Lokomotiv Chita

== Round of 32 ==
All the other Russian Premier League teams started at this stage.

30 July 1997	Metallurg Krasny Sulin	0–2	Spartak Moscow	Krasny Sulin
			Alenichev 27'; Lutovinov 31'	Stadium: Metallurg Stadium; Attendance: 7,500; Referee: Nikolai Frolov (Ramenskoye)

6 August 1997	Avtozapchast Baksan	1–3	Alania Vladikavkaz	Baksan
	Golovin 73'		Kuartov 57' (o.g.); Datdeyev 66'; Sikoyev 86'	Stadium: City Youth Stadium; Attendance: 10,500; Referee: Sergei Zuyev (Moscow)

6 August 1997	Tom Tomsk	3–1	FC Tyumen	Tomsk
	Bazhenov 35'; Ageyev 58'; Vishnevskiy 86'		Goncharov 78'	Stadium: Trud Stadium; Attendance: 7,300; Referee: Nikolai Ivanov (Saint Petersburg)

6 August 1997	Uralan Elista	1–2	Rotor Volgograd	Elista
	Litvinov 53'		Zernov 16'; Olenikov 50'	Stadium: Uralan Stadium; Attendance: 10,000; Referee: Aleksandr Kozhukhov (Moscow)

13 August 1997	FC MChS-Selyatino	1–2	Dynamo Moscow	Selyatino
	Bakalets 26'		Teryokhin 15'; Kulchiy 63'	Stadium: Stroitel Stadium; Attendance: 3,200; Referee: Nikolai Miloserdov (Saratov)

13 August 1997	Dynamo Stavropol	3–0	Zhemchuzhina Sochi	Stavropol
	Sedykh 27'; Gagiyev 61'; Berishvili 81' (pen.)			Stadium: Dynamo Stadium; Attendance: 5,000; Referee: Yuri Baskakov (Moscow)

13 August 1997	FC Oryol	1–1 (a.e.t.) (0–3 p)	Lokomotiv Moscow	Oryol
	Sarkisyan 42' (o.g.)		Kosolapov 87'	Stadium: Central Stadium; Attendance: 14,000; Referee: Nikolai Frolov (Ramenskoye)
	Penalties
	Kiryakov (penalty missed); Kostikov (penalty missed); Syomin (penalty missed)		(penalty scored) Kosolapov; (penalty scored) Maminov; (penalty scored) Chugainov

13 August 1997	Metallurg Lipetsk	1–3	Torpedo-Luzhniki Moscow	Lipetsk
	Menshchikov 90'		Carlos Alberto 41', 74'; Gashkin 45'	Stadium: Metallurg Stadium; Attendance: 22,000; Referee: Gennadi Kulichenkov (Tula)

13 August 1997	Rubin Kazan	1–0	Lokomotiv Nizhny Novgorod	Kazan
	Knyazev 55'			Stadium: Central Stadium; Attendance: 12,000; Referee: Vyacheslav Sorokin (Moscow)

13 August 1997	Arsenal Tula	3–0	Rostselmash Rostov-on-Don	Tula
	Fuzailov 27'; Klimov 66', 72'			Stadium: Arsenal Stadium; Attendance: 14,000; Referee: Feyzudin Erzimanov (Moscow)

13 August 1997	Kuban Krasnodar	2–1	Chernomorets Novorossiysk	Krasnodar
	Martsun 16'; Kutarba 65'		Berezner 52'	Stadium: Kuban Stadium; Attendance: 7,000; Referee: Aleksandr Kozhukhov (Moscow)

13 August 1997	CSK VVS-Kristall Smolensk	2–2 (a.e.t.) (4–5 p)	Baltika Kaliningrad	Smolensk
	Adamyan 20', 54'		Lemish 65' (pen.), 80'	Stadium: Spartak Stadium; Attendance: 11,000; Referee: Garyafi Zhafyarov (Moscow)
	Penalties
	Selenkov (penalty missed); Solyanik (penalty scored); Aleksandrov (penalty scored); Tikhomirov (penalty scored); Korolyov (penalty scored)		(penalty scored) Navochenko; (penalty scored) Lemish; (penalty scored) Yablonskyi; (penalty scored) Vekhtev; (penalty scored) Rumyantsev

13 August 1997	Volga Ulyanovsk	1–2	Krylia Sovetov Samara	Ulyanovsk
	Borisko 83'		Minashvili 54'; Tsiklauri 77'	Stadium: Trud Stadium; Attendance: 5,000; Referee: Andrei Butenko (Moscow)

13 August 1997	Neftekhimik Nizhnekamsk	1–3	KAMAZ-Chally Naberezhnye Chelny	Nizhnekamsk
	Kolotilko 50'		Preikšaitis 23'; Babenko 74'; Jishkariani 75'	Stadium: Neftekhimik Stadium; Attendance: 4,000; Referee: Vladimir Ovchinnikov (Moscow)

13 August 1997	Lokomotiv Chita	0–0 (a.e.t.) (3–4 p)	CSKA Moscow	Chita
	Ryabukha (yellow card) 40' (yellow-red card) 96'; Makiyenko (yellow card) 88' (yellow-red card) 119'			Stadium: Lokomotiv Stadium; Attendance: 12,000; Referee: Sergei Isakov (Nizhny Tagil)
	Penalties
	Bogdanov (penalty missed); Kreisman (penalty scored); Seredin (penalty scored); Nedorezov (penalty scored); Nerovny (penalty missed)		(penalty missed) Bokov; (penalty scored) Movsisyan; (penalty scored) Gerasimov; (penalty scored) Kuznetsov; (penalty scored) Ageyev

13 August 1997	Shinnik Yaroslavl	2–3	Zenit Saint Petersburg	Yaroslavl
	Filippov 45'; Yenin 51'		Lepyokhin 2'; Vernydub 73' (pen.); Popovych 81'	Stadium: Shinnik Stadium; Attendance: 10,500; Referee: Sergei Anokhin (Moscow)

== Round of 16 ==
18 October 1997	Rubin Kazan	1–0	Arsenal Tula	Kazan
	Akhmetgaliyev 88'			Stadium: Central Stadium; Attendance: 15,000; Referee: Yuri Tikhomirov (Moscow)

22 October 1997	Dynamo Moscow	3–1	Dynamo Stavropol	Moscow
	Grishin 20'; Kobelev 61' (pen.); Kosolapov 89'		Tsatskin 48' (pen.)	Stadium: Dynamo Stadium; Attendance: 1,500; Referee: Aleksandr Lapin (Ufa)

22 October 1997	Krylia Sovetov Samara	4–0	Baltika Kaliningrad	Samara
	S. Bulatov 6'; V. Bulatov 65', 76'; Safronov 85'		B. Ajinjal (red card) 66'	Stadium: Metallurg Stadium; Attendance: 10,000; Referee: Andrei Butenko (Moscow)

22 October 1997	CSKA Moscow	3–2	Zenit Saint Petersburg	Moscow
	Semak 7', 68'; Khomukha 19'		Panov 4'; Vernydub 83' (pen.)	Stadium: CSKA Moscow Stadium; Attendance: 2,000; Referee: Sergei Gusev (Tobolsk)

21 March 1998	Alania Vladikavkaz	1–0	Tom Tomsk	Vladikavkaz
	Gakhokidze 20'			Stadium: Republican Spartak Stadium; Attendance: 20,000; Referee: Garyafi Zhafyarov (Moscow)

21 March 1998	Spartak Moscow	6–0	Kuban Krasnodar	Moscow
	Tsymbalar 5', 45', 51'; Kanishchev 43'; Tikhonov 48'; Romaschenko 90'; Gorlukovich (red card) 55'			Stadium: Dynamo Stadium; Attendance: 7,000; Referee: Viktor Yapryntsev (Samara)

21 March 1998	KAMAZ-Chally Naberezhnye Chelny	3–4	Rotor Volgograd	Naberezhnye Chelny
	Degtyaryov 49' (pen.), 60'; Zayarnyi 64' (pen.)		Berketov 17'; Zubko 26'; Zernov 54'; Veretennikov 85'	Stadium: KAMAZ stadium Attendance: 6,000; Referee: Feyzudin Erzimanov (Moscow)

23 March 1998	Torpedo Moscow (Note: FC Torpedo-Luzhniki was changed their name to FC Torpedo Moscow during the winter break.)	0–2	Lokomotiv Moscow	Moscow
	Eguavoen (red card) 30'		Haras 70'; Janashia 85'	Stadium: Lokomotiv Stadium; Attendance: 5,000; Referee: Sergei Khusainov (Moscow)

== Quarter-finals ==
8 April 1998	Lokomotiv Moscow	1–0	Dynamo Moscow	Moscow
	Kosolapov 57'			Stadium: Lokomotiv Stadium; Attendance: 3,500; Referee: Andrei Butenko (Moscow)

8 April 1998	Spartak Moscow	2–0	Krylia Sovetov Samara	Moscow
	Tsymbalar 41'; Tikhonov 81'			Stadium: Dynamo Stadium; Attendance: 5,000; Referee: Aleksandr Lapin (Ufa)

14 April 1998	Rotor Volgograd	5–3 (a.e.t.)	CSKA Moscow	Volgograd
	Veretennikov 55' (pen.), 93', 118'; Burlachenko 76'; Zubko 95'		Kornaukhov 66'; Kulik 87'; Varlamov 113'	Stadium: Central Stadium; Attendance: 4,000; Referee: Gennadi Kulichenkov (Tula)

15 April 1998	Alania Vladikavkaz	3–0	Rubin Kazan	Vladikavkaz
	Yanovskiy 14' (pen.); Chaladze 17'; Botsiyev 86'			Stadium: Republican Spartak Stadium; Attendance: 18,000; Referee: Valentin Ivanov (Moscow)

== Semi-finals ==
28 April 1998	Rotor Volgograd	0–2	Spartak Moscow	Volgograd
			Tikhonov 35'; Alenichev 69'	Stadium: Central Stadium; Attendance: 12,000; Referee: Nikolai Levnikov (Saint Petersburg)

29 April 1998	Lokomotiv Moscow	1–0	Alania Vladikavkaz	Moscow
	Janashia 82'			Stadium: Lokomotiv Stadium; Attendance: 3,200; Referee: Gennadi Kulichenkov (Tula)

== Final ==
7 June 1998

Spartak Moscow	1–0	Lokomotiv Moscow
Tikhonov 86'

Luzhniki Stadium, Moscow
Attendance: 36,800
Referee: Lom-Ali Ibragimov (Grozny)

FC Spartak Moscow	FC Lokomotiv Moscow

FC Spartak Moscow:
GK	(Russia) Aleksandr Filimonov
DF	(Russia) Sergei Gorlukovich
DF	(Russia) Dmitri Khlestov
MF	(Russia) Ilya Tsymbalar
DF	(Belarus) Miroslav Romaschenko
DF	(Russia) Dimitri Ananko
DF	(Ukraine) Dmytro Parfenov
MF	(Russia) Dmitri Alenichev (captain)
MF	(Russia) Yegor Titov
FW	(Russia) Maksim Buznikin (substituted off) 61'
MF	(Russia) Andrey Tikhonov
Substitutes:
FW	(Russia) Anatoli Kanishchev (substituted on) 61'
Manager:
(Russia) Oleg Romantsev

FC Lokomotiv Moscow:
GK	(Russia) Ruslan Nigmatullin
DF	(Tajikistan) Igor Cherevchenko
MF	(Russia) Yuri Alekseevich Drozdov
MF	(Russia) Yevgeni Kharlachyov
DF	(Armenia) Sargis Hovhannisyan
DF	(Russia) Igor Chugainov
MF	(Russia) Alexei Kosolapov (captain)
DF	(Belarus) Sergei Gurenko
FW	(Georgia (country)) Zaza Janashia
MF	(Russia) Dmitri Loskov (substituted off) 54'
FW	(Russia) Aleksandr Borodyuk
Substitutes:
MF	(Russia) Andrei Solomatin (substituted on) 54'
Manager:
(Russia) Yuri Syomin

MATCH RULES

- 90 minutes.
- 30 minutes of extra-time if necessary.
- Penalty shootout if scores still level.
- Seven named substitutes
- Maximum of 3 substitutions.

Played in the earlier stages, but not in the final game:

FC Spartak Moscow: Vadim Evseev (DF), Ramiz Mamedov (DF), Konstantin Golovskoy (DF), Aleksei Melyoshin (MF), Aleksei Bakharev (MF), Aleksandr Shirko (FW), Sergey Dmitriev (FW), Aleksei Zlydnev (FW), Sergei Lutovinov (FW), Luis Robson (Brazil) (FW).

FC Lokomotiv Moscow: Aleksandr Podshivalov (GK), Aleksei Arifullin (DF), Andrei Lavrik (Belarus) (DF), Oleg Pashinin (Uzbekistan) (DF), Vladimir Maminov (Uzbekistan) (MF), Aleksandr Smirnov (MF), Bakhva Tedeyev (MF), Albert Sarkisyan (Armenia) (MF), Vitali Veselov (FW), Oleh Haras (Ukraine) (FW).
