= 1996–97 Russian Cup =

Tournament details
- Country: Russia

Final positions
- Champions: Lokomotiv Moscow
- Runners-up: Dynamo Moscow

The 1996–97 Russian Cup was the fifth season of the Russian Association football knockout tournament since the dissolution of Soviet Union.

== First round ==
| Team 1 | Score | Team 2 |
|---|---|---|
17 April 1996
| Niva Slavyansk-na-Kubani | 2–1 | Kuban Slavyansk-na-Kubani |
21 April 1996
| Volochanin Vyshny Volochyok | 0–2 | Neftyanik Yaroslavl |
| Spartak Kostroma | w/o | Vympel Rybinsk |
| Mashinostroitel Pskov | 1–0 | CSK VVS-Kristall Smolensk |
| Kristall Dyatkovo | 1–4 | Dynamo Bryansk |
| Shakhtyor Shakhty | 2–1 (a.e.t.) | Metallurg Krasny Sulin |
| Istochnik Rostov-on-Don | 2–0 | SKA Rostov-on-Don |
| FC Oryol | 3–1 | Avangard Kursk |
| Salyut-YuKOS Belgorod | 3–0 | Metallurg Lipetsk |
| Fabus Bronnitsy | 0–2 | FC MChS-Selyatino |
| GFC Orekhovo | 1–0 | Industriya Borovsk |
| Mashinostroitel Sergiyev Posad | 1–0 | Kosmos Dolgoprudny |
| Venets Gulkevichi | 0–1 | Kolos Krasnodar |
| APK Morozovsk | 0–1 | Torpedo Taganrog |
| Dynamo Saint Petersburg | w/o | Saturn-1991 Saint Petersburg |
| FC Gatchina | w/o | Metallurg Pikalyovo |
| Dynamo Vologda | 1–3 (a.e.t.) | Tekstilshchik Ivanovo |
| Kavkazkabel Prokhladny | 3–0 | FC Mozdok |
| Astrateks Astrakhan | 1–0 | Volgar-Gazprom Astrakhan |
| FC Derbent | 1–2 | Anzhi Makhachkala |
| Dynamo-Imamat Makhachkala | 1–0 | Angusht Nazran |
| Dynamo Perm | 0–6 | Amkar Perm |
| Dynamo Mikhaylovka | 3–1 | Spartak Tambov |
| Salyut Saratov | 0–0 (a.e.t.) (6–7 p) | Zavodchanin Saratov |
| Lada Dimitrovgrad | 4–1 | Volga Ulyanovsk |
| Volga Balakovo | 1–5 | Svetotekhnika Saransk |
| Spartak-Bratskiy Yuzhny | 2–1 | Volgodonsk |
| Olimp Kislovodsk | 2–0 | Energiya Pyatigorsk |
| Iriston Vladikavkaz | 4–0 | Avtodor Vladikavkaz |
| Beshtau Lermontov | 0–6 | Avtozapchast Baksan |
| Gazovik Orenburg | 0–1 | Nosta Novotroitsk |
| Sodovik Sterlitamak | 2–1 | Metallurg Magnitogorsk |
| Planeta Bugulma | 2–0 | Zenit Izhevsk |
| Neftyanik Pokhvistnevo | 0–2 | Zenit Penza |
| Metiznik Magnitogorsk | 1–1 (a.e.t.) (1–4 p) | UralAZ Miass |
| Trubnik Kamensk-Uralsky | 1–2 | Sibir Kurgan |
| Gornyak Kachkanar | w/o | Uralets Nizhny Tagil |
| Gornyak Kushva | 0–2 | Energiya Chaykovsky |
| Lokomotiv Yelets | 1–3 | Lokomotiv Liski |
| Turbostroitel Kaluga | 0–0 (a.e.t.) (3–5 p) | Spartak Ryazan |
| Luch Tula | 1–0 | Don Novomoskovsk |
| Spartak Shchyolkovo | 1–0 | Arsenal Tula |
| Khimik Dzerzhinsk | 2–1 | Torpedo Vladimir |
| Metallurg Vyksa | 1–0 | Torpedo Pavlovo |
| Druzhba Yoshkar-Ola | 0–2 | Rubin Kazan |
| Progress Zelenodolsk | 5–2 | Kristall Sergach |
22 April 1996
| Monolit Moscow | 2–1 | Mosenergo Moscow |
| Chertanovo Moscow | 1–2 | Krasnogvardeyets Moscow |
| Torgmash Lyubertsy | 1–1 (a.e.t.) (3–4 p) | Titan Reutov |
| Torpedo Rubtsovsk | 1–1 (a.e.t.) (3–0 p) | Dynamo Barnaul |
| Motor Prokopyevsk | 0–3 | Metallurg-ZapSib Novokuznetsk |
| FC Mezhdurechensk | 0–1 | Kuzbass Kemerovo |
| Viktoriya Nazarovo | 5–2 | Metallurg Krasnoyarsk |
| Oka Kolomna | 1–3 (a.e.t.) | Avangard-Kortek Kolomna |
| Avtomobilist Noginsk | 6–0 | TRASKO Moscow |
| Torpedo Armavir | 2–1 (a.e.t.) | Kuban Krasnodar |
| Bulat Cherepovets | 0–1 | Lokomotiv-Saturn Saint Petersburg |
| Tom Tomsk | 4–0 | Irtysh Omsk |
| Dynamo Omsk | 3–0 | Samotlor-XXI Nizhnevartovsk |
| Irtysh Tobolsk | w/o | Zvezda Perm |

== Second round ==
| Team 1 | Score | Team 2 |
|---|---|---|
1 May 1996
| Krasnogvardeyets Moscow | 0–0 (a.e.t.) (5–4 p) | Monolit Moscow |
2 May 1996
| Neftyanik Yaroslavl | 2–1 (a.e.t.) | Spartak Kostroma |
| Dynamo Bryansk | 1–0 | Mashinostroitel Pskov |
| Istochnik Rostov-on-Don | 4–0 | Shakhtyor Shakhty |
| FC Oryol | 1–0 | Salyut-YuKOS Belgorod |
| FC MChS-Selyatino | 2–1 | Titan Reutov |
| Metallurg-ZapSib Novokuznetsk | 2–3 | Torpedo Rubtsovsk |
| Kuzbass Kemerovo | 3–1 (a.e.t.) | Viktoriya Nazarovo |
| Avangard-Kortek Kolomna | 2–0 | GFC Orekhovo |
| Avtomobilist Noginsk | 2–0 | Mashinostroitel Sergiyev Posad |
| Kolos Krasnodar | 5–1 | Niva Slavyansk-na-Kubani |
| Torpedo Taganrog | 1–0 | Torpedo Armavir |
| Okean Nakhodka | w/o | Sakhalin Kholmsk |
| SKA Khabarovsk | w/o | Dynamo Yakutsk |
| Selenga Ulan-Ude | 1–1 (a.e.t.) (4–5 p) | Lokomotiv Chita |
| Angara Angarsk | 0–1 | Zvezda Irkutsk |
| Dynamo Saint Petersburg | 0–2 (a.e.t.) | FC Gatchina |
| Lokomotiv-Saturn Saint Petersburg | 2–1 | Tekstilshchik Ivanovo |
| Kavkazkabel Prokhladny | 5–0 | Astrateks Astrakhan |
| Anzhi Makhachkala | 2–0 | Dynamo-Imamat Makhachkala |
| Dynamo Omsk | 0–1 | Tom Tomsk |
| Amkar Perm | 1–1 (a.e.t.) (5–3 p) | Irtysh Tobolsk |
| Zavodchanin Saratov | 0–1 | Dynamo Mikhaylovka |
| Lada Dimitrovgrad | 2–1 | Svetotekhnika Saransk |
| Olimp Kislovodsk | 4–0 | Spartak-Bratskiy Yuzhny |
| Avtozapchast Baksan | 3–0 | Iriston Vladikavkaz |
| Nosta Novotroitsk | 2–0 | Sodovik Sterlitamak |
| Zenit Penza | 1–0 | Planeta Bugulma |
| Sibir Kurgan | 1–2 | UralAZ Miass |
| Uralets Nizhny Tagil | 2–2 (a.e.t.) (5–4 p) | Energiya Chaykovsky |
| Lokomotiv Liski | 3–0 | Spartak Ryazan |
| Spartak Shchyolkovo | 4–3 | Luch Tula |
| Khimik Dzerzhinsk | 2–2 (a.e.t.) (5–4 p) | Metallurg Vyksa |
| Rubin Kazan | 1–0 | Progress Zelenodolsk |

== Third round ==
| Team 1 | Score | Team 2 |
|---|---|---|
30 May 1996
| Dynamo Bryansk | 1–0 | Neftyanik Yaroslavl |
| Kuzbass Kemerovo | 1–0 | Torpedo Rubtsovsk |
| Tom Tomsk | 4–0 | Amkar Perm |
| Nosta Novotroitsk | 2–0 | Zenit Penza |
31 May 1996
| Kolos Krasnodar | 3–0 | Torpedo Taganrog |
| Avtozapchast Baksan | 0–0 (a.e.t.) (4–3 p) | Olimp Kislovodsk |
1 June 1996
| FC Oryol | 2–1 | Istochnik Rostov-on-Don |
| Krasnogvardeyets Moscow | 0–5 | FC MChS-Selyatino |
| Avangard-Kortek Kolomna | 0–2 | Avtomobilist Noginsk |
| SKA Khabarovsk | 2–1 | Okean Nakhodka |
| Lokomotiv Chita | 3–1 | Zvezda Irkutsk |
| Lokomotiv-Saturn Saint Petersburg | 1–0 | FC Gatchina |
| Kavkazkabel Prokhladny | 0–2 | Anzhi Makhachkala |
| Lada Dimitrovgrad | 3–0 | Dynamo Mikhaylovka |
| UralAZ Miass | 3–1 | Uralets Nizhny Tagil |
| Lokomotiv Liski | 3–1 | Spartak Shchyolkovo |
| Rubin Kazan | 5–1 | Khimik Dzerzhinsk |

== Fourth round ==
Russian Premier League teams Zenit Saint Petersburg and Lada-Tolyatti started at this stage.

| Team 1 | Score | Team 2 |
|---|---|---|
29 June 1996
| Lokomotiv Liski | 1–3 | Fakel Voronezh |
30 June 19966
| Dynamo Bryansk | 2–3 | Shinnik Yaroslavl |
| FC Oryol | 2–1 | Sokol-PZhD Saratov |
| FC MChS-Selyatino | 1–1 (a.e.t.) (3–4 p) | Saturn Ramenskoye |
| Kuzbass Kemerovo | 0–1 | Zarya Leninsk-Kuznetsky |
| Avtomobilist Noginsk | 2–1 (a.e.t.) | Torpedo Arzamas |
| Kolos Krasnodar | 1–2 | Druzhba Maykop |
| Lokomotiv Chita | 1–1 (a.e.t.) (4–2 p) | SKA Khabarovsk |
| Anzhi Makhachkala | 8–0 | Spartak Nalchik |
| Tom Tomsk | 7–0 | Chkalovets Novosibirsk |
| Lada Dimitrovgrad | 2–0 | Torpedo Volzhsky |
| Avtozapchast Baksan | 3–1 | Dynamo Stavropol |
| Nosta Novotroitsk | 2–1 | Neftekhimik Nizhnekamsk |
| UralAZ Miass | 2–0 | Gazovik-Gazprom Izhevsk |

| 30 June 1996 | Lokomotiv-Saturn Saint Petersburg | 0–1 (a.e.t.) | Zenit Saint Petersburg | Saint Petersburg |
| | | | Kulik 115' | Stadium: Kirov Stadium; Attendance: 2,000; Referee: Nikolai Obyedkov (Saint Petersburg) |

| 30 June 1996 | Rubin Kazan | 0–2 | Lada-Tolyatti | Kazan |
| | | | Buznikin 64'; Serchenkov 90' | Stadium: Central Stadium; Attendance: 2,500; Referee: Nikolai Fyodorov (Voronezh) |

== Round of 32 ==
All the other Russian Premier League teams started at this stage.

| 3 August 1996 | Druzhba Maykop | 1–2 (a.e.t.) | Rostselmash Rostov-on-Don | Maykop |
| | Komlichenko 55'; Autlev (yellow card) 80' (yellow-red card) 92' | | Maslov 75', 97'; Loskov (yellow card) 18' (yellow-red card) 76' | Stadium: Druzhba Stadium; Attendance: 3,000; Referee: Sergei Khusainov (Moscow) |

| 14 August 1996 | FC Oryol | 1–0 | Zhemchuzhina Sochi | Oryol |
| | Bakulin 87' | | | Stadium: Central Stadium; Attendance: 10,000; Referee: Feyzudin Erzimanov (Moscow) |

| 14 August 1996 | Zarya Leninsk-Kuznetsky | 5–1 | KAMAZ-Chally Naberezhnye Chelny | Leninsk-Kuznetsky |
| | Kormiltsev 10'; Yarkin 42' (pen.), 54'; Tsykin 63' (o.g.); Bazhenov 84' | | Panchenko 19' | Stadium: Shakhtyor Stadium, Attendance: 6,000; Referee: Aleksandr Kozhukhov (Moscow) |

| 14 August 1996 | Lokomotiv Chita | w/o | Uralmash Yekaterinburg |

| 14 August 1996 | Zenit Saint Petersburg | 5–0 | Energiya-Tekstilshchik Kamyshin | Saint Petersburg |
| | Dmitriev 19'; Khomukha 46', 90'; Kulik 50', 86' | | | Stadium: Petrovsky Stadium; Attendance: 4,000; Referee: Valentin Ivanov (Moscow) |

| 14 August 1996 | Anzhi Makhachkala | 0–2 | Alania Vladikavkaz | Makhachkala |
| | | | Qosimov 41'; Sergeyev 87' | Stadium: Dynamo Stadium; Attendance: 9,500; Referee: Anatoli Malyarov (Moscow) |

| 14 August 1996 | Tom Tomsk | 0–2 | Krylia Sovetov Samara | Tomsk |
| | | | Bulatov 9'; Makeyev 64' | Stadium: Trud Stadium; Attendance: 6,000; Referee: Nikolai Ivanov (Saint Petersburg) |

| 14 August 1996 | UralAZ Miass | 2–0 | Baltika Kaliningrad | Miass |
| | Nidbaykin 31', 85' | | | Stadium: UralAZ Stadium; Attendance: 4,000; Referee: Yuri Baskakov (Moscow) |

| 20 August 1996 | Nosta Novotroitsk | 1–2 | Lokomotiv Moscow | Novotroitsk |
| | Rylov 50' | | Kosolapov 29'; Solomatin 55' | Stadium: Metallurg Stadium; Attendance: 13,000; Referee: Gennadi Kulichenkov (Tula) |

| 21 August 1996 | Avtozapchast Baksan | 2–1 (a.e.t.) | Chernomorets Novorossiysk | Baksan |
| | Apshev 89'; Kugotov 119' (pen.) | | Glukhov 50' | Stadium: Yunost City Stadium; Attendance: 5,000; Referee: Andrei Butenko (Moscow) |

| 24 September 1996 | Lada-Tolyatti | 1–0 | Lokomotiv Nizhny Novgorod | Tolyatti |
| | Kryachik 75' | | | Stadium: Torpedo Stadium; Attendance: 1,000; Referee: Aleksandr Kozhukhov (Moscow) |

| 15 October 1996 | Lada Dimitrovgrad | 2–3 | Rotor Volgograd | Dimitrovgrad |
| | Zaikin 28'; Kuznetsov 28' | | Veretennikov 15', 20' (pen.); Ilyushin 70' | Stadium: Torpedo Stadium; Attendance: 10,000; Referee: Garyafi Zhafyarov (Moscow) |

| 15 October 1996 | Fakel Voronezh | 0–1 | Torpedo-Luzhniki Moscow | Voronezh |
| | | | Kamnev 30' | Stadium: Tsentralnyi Profsoyuz Stadion; Attendance: 20,000; Referee: Nikolai Levnikov (Saint Petersburg) |

| 6 November 1996 | Shinnik Yaroslavl | 1–3 | Dynamo Moscow | Yaroslavl |
| | Yashkin 44' (pen.) | | Cheryshev 24'; Shtanyuk 72'; Kobelev 81' | Stadium: Shinnik Stadium; Attendance: 13,000; Referee: Lom-Ali Ibragimov (Grozny) |

| 8 April 1997 | Saturn Ramenskoye | 0–2 | CSKA Moscow | Ramenskoye |
| | | | Kulik 10', 44' (pen.) | Stadium: Saturn Stadium; Attendance: 13,000; Referee: Lom-Ali Ibragimov (Grozny) |

| 8 April 1997 | Avtomobilist Noginsk | 0–1 | Spartak Moscow | Noginsk |
| | | | Kechinov 39' | Stadium: Avtomobilist Stadium; Attendance: 6,000; Referee: Sergei Gusev (Tobolsk) |

== Round of 16 ==
| 15 April 1997 | Dynamo Moscow | 1–0 | FC Oryol | Moscow |
| | Teryokhin 9' | | | Stadium: Dynamo Stadium; Attendance: 1,500; Referee: Nikolai Ivanov (Saint Petersburg) |

| 15 April 1997 | Spartak Moscow | 4–1 | Rostselmash Rostov-on-Don | Moscow |
| | Kechinov 2'; Alenichev 10', 72'; Melyoshin 79' | | Maslov 71' | Stadium: Torpedo Stadium; Attendance: 8,400; Referee: Gennadi Kulichenkov (Tula) |

| 15 April 1997 | Rotor Volgograd | 4–0 | Avtozapchast Baksan | Volgograd |
| | Tishchenko 4'; Krivov 27'; Veretennikov 45' (pen.), 85' | | | Stadium: Central Stadium; Attendance: 11,000; Referee: Andrei Butenko (Moscow) |

| 15 April 1997 | Lokomotiv Moscow | 5–0 | UralAZ Miass | Moscow |
| | Kharlachyov 6'; Kosolapov 15'; Janashia 22'; Maminov 85'; Kamnev 89' | | Zlobin (yellow card) 25' (yellow-red card) 82' | Stadium: Lokomotiv Stadium; Attendance: 700; Referee: Nikolai Frolov (Ramenskoye) |

| 16 April 1997 | CSKA Moscow | 0–0 (a.e.t.) (7–8 p) | Zarya Leninsk-Kuznetsky | Moscow |
| | | | Dzutsev (yellow card) 37' (yellow-red card) 108' | Stadium: Dynamo Stadium; Attendance: 3,500; Referee: Nikolai Levnikov (Saint Petersburg) |
| | Penalties |
| | Minko (penalty scored); Grishin (penalty scored); Bokov (penalty missed); Khomukha (penalty scored); Kulik (penalty scored); Gerasimov (penalty scored); Tsaplin (penalty scored); Lobzhanidze (penalty scored); Shustikov (penalty missed) | | (penalty scored) Momotov; (penalty scored) Yarkin; (penalty missed) Musin; (penalty scored) Toporov; (penalty scored) Yanotovskiy; (penalty scored) Kyrylov; (penalty scored) Baryshev; (penalty scored) Smertin; (penalty scored) Bogochev |

| 16 April 1997 | Zenit Saint Petersburg | 0–0 (a.e.t.) (4–3 p) | Lokomotiv Chita | Saint Petersburg |
| | Vernydub (penalty missed) 71' | | | Stadium: Petrovsky Stadium; Attendance: 6,000; Referee: Vladimir Ovchinnikov (Moscow) |
| | Penalties |
| | Zazulin (penalty scored); Yegunov (penalty scored); Panov (penalty missed); Vernydub (penalty scored); Svystunov (penalty scored) | | (penalty scored) Popov; (penalty scored) Bogdanov; (penalty missed) Nedorezov; (penalty missed) Galimov; (penalty scored) Istomin |

| 16 April 1997 | Krylia Sovetov Samara | 1–0 | Alania Vladikavkaz | Samara |
| | Avalyan 51' | | | Stadium: Metallurg Stadium; Attendance: 20,000; Referee: Garyafi Zhafyarov (Moscow) |

| 16 April 1997 | Torpedo-Luzhniki Moscow | 6–1 | Lada-Tolyatti | Moscow |
| | Khokhlov 21', 79', 88'; Kamoltsev 60', 90'; Arlowski 77' | | Vereshchak 85' | Stadium: Torpedo Stadium; Attendance: 2,400; Referee: Lom-Ali Ibragimov (Grozny) |

== Quarter-finals ==
| 6 May 1997 | Zarya Leninsk-Kuznetsky | 0–2 | Dynamo Moscow | Leninsk-Kuznetsky |
| | | | Kobelev 18'; Kulchiy 70' | Stadium: Shakhtyor Stadium; Attendance: 11,000; Referee: Taras Bezubyak (Saint Petersburg) |

| 7 May 1997 | Spartak Moscow | 0–1 | Zenit Saint Petersburg | Moscow |
| | | | Lepyokhin 79' | Stadium: Torpedo Stadium; Attendance: 13,300; Referee: Lom-Ali Ibragimov (Grozny) |

| 20 May 1997 | Krylia Sovetov Samara | 1–0 | Rotor Volgograd | Samara |
| | Popkhadze 84' | | | Stadium: Metallurg Stadium; Attendance: 12,000; Referee: Lom-Ali Ibragimov (Grozny) |

| 21 May 1997 | Torpedo-Luzhniki Moscow | 1–2 | Lokomotiv Moscow | Moscow |
| | Bushmanov 18' | | Kharlachyov 69'; Kosolapov 77' (pen.) | Stadium: Torpedo Stadium; Attendance: 4,800; Referee: Vladimir Ovchinnikov (Moscow) |

== Semi-finals ==
| 27 May 1997 | Dynamo Moscow | 1–0 | Zenit Saint Petersburg | Moscow |
| | Kovtun 17' | | | Stadium: Torpedo Stadium; Attendance: 4,800; Referee: Gennadi Kulichenkov (Tula) |

| 28 May 1997 | Lokomotiv Moscow | 1–0 | Krylia Sovetov Samara | Moscow |
| | Smirnov 15' | | | Stadium: Lokomotiv Stadium; Attendance: 3,500; Referee: Nikolai Levnikov (Saint Petersburg) |

== Final ==
11 June 1997

| Lokomotiv Moscow | 2–0 | Dynamo Moscow |
|---|---|---|
| Smirnov 25'; Kharlachyov 78' |

Torpedo Stadium, Moscow
Attendance: 13,800
Referee: Vladimir Ovchinnikov (Moscow)

| FC Lokomotiv Moscow | FC Dynamo Moscow |

FC Lokomotiv Moscow:
| GK | (Russia) Sergei Ovchinnikov |
| DF | (Russia) Aleksei Arifullin |
| MF | (Russia) Yuri Alekseevich Drozdov |
| MF | (Russia) Yevgeni Kharlachyov |
| DF | (Russia) Andrei Solomatin |
| DF | (Russia) Igor Chugainov |
| MF | (Russia) Alexei Kosolapov (captain) |
| DF | (Belarus) Sergei Gurenko |
| MF | (Russia) Aleksandr Borodyuk (substituted off) 71' |
| DF | (Tajikistan) Igor Cherevchenko (substituted off) 47' |
| MF | (Russia) Aleksandr Smirnov (substituted off) 87' |
Substitutes:
| FW | (Georgia (country)) Zaza Janashia (substituted on) 71' |
| MF | (Uzbekistan) Vladimir Maminov (substituted on) 47' |
| FW | (Russia) Oleg Garin (substituted on) 87' |
Manager:
(Russia) Yuri Semin

FC Dynamo Moscow:
| GK | (Russia) Andrei Smetanin (captain) |
| DF | (Belarus) Erik Yakhimovich |
| DF | (Russia) Yuri Kovtun |
| DF | (Belarus) Andrei Ostrovskiy |
| DF | (Belarus) Sergei Shtanyuk |
| MF | (Russia) Andrey Kobelev |
| MF | (Russia) Sergey Grishin |
| MF | (Russia) Vladimir Skokov (substituted off) 64' |
| FW | (Russia) Oleg Sergeyev (substituted off) 48' |
| MF | (Russia) Sergei Nekrasov (substituted off) 52' |
| FW | (Russia) Oleg Teryokhin |
Substitutes:
| MF | (Russia) Aleksandr Tochilin (substituted on) 64' |
| FW | (Russia) Andrei Dyomkin (substituted on) 48' |
| MF | (Belarus) Aliaksandr Kulchiy (substituted on) 52' |
Manager:
(Russia) Adamas Golodets

MATCH RULES

- 90 minutes.
- 30 minutes of extra-time if necessary.
- Penalty shootout if scores still level.
- Seven named substitutes
- Maximum of 3 substitutions.

Played in the earlier stages, but not in the final game:

FC Lokomotiv Moscow: Khasanbi Bidzhiyev (GK), Oleg Pashinin (Uzbekistan) (DF), Oleg Elyshev (MF), Vitali Veselov (FW), Dmitri Bulykin (FW), Oleh Haras (Ukraine) (FW), Konstantin Kamnev (FW), Valeriy Yablochkin (Kazakhstan) (FW).

FC Dynamo Moscow: Aleksei Guschin (DF), Sergei Kolotovkin (DF), Yevgeni Korablyov (DF), Rolan Gusev (MF), Yuri Kuznetsov (MF), Aleksandr Grishin (MF), Vitali Kulyov (MF), Aleksei Kutsenko (FW), Yuri Tishkov (FW), Dmitri Cheryshev (FW).
