= Kazakovsky Promysel =

Kazakovsky Promysel Казаковский Промысел
- Selo
- Location within Zabaykalsky Krai Location within Russia
- Coordinates: 51°46′N 117°01′E
- Country: Russia
- Region: Zabaykalsky Krai
- District: Baleysky District
- Time zone: UTC+9:00

Kazakovsky Promysel (Russian: Казаковский Промысел) is a rural locality (a selo) in Baleysky District, Zabaykalsky Krai, Russia. Population: 639 (2021 census); 723 (2010 census); 841 (2002 census); There are 16 streets in this selo.

== Geography ==
This rural locality is located 34 km from Baley (the district's administrative centre), 244 km from Chita (capital of Zabaykalsky Krai) and 5,482 km from Moscow. Bolshoye Kazakovo is the nearest rural locality.
