= Ust-Yagyo =

Ust-Yagyo Усть-Ягьё
- Selo
- Location within Zabaykalsky Krai Location within Russia
- Coordinates: 51°44′N 117°12′E
- Country: Russia
- Region: Zabaykalsky Krai
- District: Baleysky District
- Time zone: UTC+9:00

Ust-Yagyo (Russian: Усть-Ягьё) is a rural locality (a selo) in Baleysky District, Zabaykalsky Krai, Russia. Population: 46 (2021 census); 75 (2010 census); 92 (2002 census); There are 5 streets in this selo.

== Geography ==
This rural locality is located 44 km from Baley (the district's administrative centre), 258 km from Chita (capital of Zabaykalsky Krai) and 5,498 km from Moscow. Zhidka is the nearest rural locality.
