= Undino-Polesye =

Undino-Polesye Ундино-Поселье
- Selo
- Location within Zabaykalsky Krai Location within Russia
- Coordinates: 51°25′N 116°14′E
- Country: Russia
- Region: Zabaykalsky Krai
- District: Baleysky District
- Time zone: UTC+9:00

Undino-Polesye (Russian: Ундино-Поселье) is a rural locality (a selo) in Baleysky District, Zabaykalsky Krai, Russia. Population: 888 (2021 census); 1,183 (2010 census); 1,471 (2002 census); There are 19 streets in this selo.

== Geography ==
This rural locality is located 33 km from Baley (the district's administrative centre), 202 km from Chita (capital of Zabaykalsky Krai) and 5,473 km from Moscow. Matusovo is the nearest rural locality.
