= Verkhny Kokuy =

Verkhny Kokuy Верхний Кокуй
- Selo
- Location within Zabaykalsky Krai Location within Russia
- Coordinates: 51°39′N 116°51′E
- Country: Russia
- Region: Zabaykalsky Krai
- District: Baleysky District
- Time zone: UTC+9:00

Verkhny Kokuy (Russian: Верхний Кокуй) is a rural locality (a selo) in Baleysky District, Zabaykalsky Krai, Russia. Population: 142 (2010 census); 187 (2002 census); There are 3 streets in this selo.

== Geography ==
This rural locality is located 18 km from Baley (the district's administrative centre), 236 km from Chita (capital of Zabaykalsky Krai) and 5,485 km from Moscow. Bochkaryovo is the nearest rural locality.
