= Kolobovo, Baleysky District, Zabaykalsky Krai =

Kolobovo Колобово
- Selo
- Location within Zabaykalsky Krai Location within Russia
- Coordinates: 51°45′N 117°09′E
- Country: Russia
- Region: Zabaykalsky Krai
- District: Baleysky District
- Time zone: UTC+9:00

Kolobovo (Russian: Колобово) is a rural locality (a selo) in Baleysky District, Zabaykalsky Krai, Russia. Population: 239 (2021 census); 311 (2010 census); 378 (2002 census); There are 9 streets in this selo.

== Geography ==
This rural locality is located 41 km from Baley (the district's administrative centre), 254 km from Chita (capital of Zabaykalsky Krai) and 5,492 km from Moscow. Zhidka is the nearest rural locality.
