= Podoynitsyno =

Podoynitsyno Подойницыно
- Selo
- Location within Zabaykalsky Krai Location within Russia
- Coordinates: 51°39′N 116°47′E
- Country: Russia
- Region: Zabaykalsky Krai
- District: Baleysky District
- Time zone: UTC+9:00

Podoynitsyno (Russian: Подойницыно) is a rural locality (a selo) in Baleysky District, Zabaykalsky Krai, Russia. Population: 405 (2021 census); 484 (2010 census); 548 (2002 census); There are 7 streets in this selo.

== Geography ==
This rural locality is located 13 km from Baley (the district's administrative centre), 231 km from Chita (capital of Zabaykalsky Krai) and 5,481 km from Moscow. Onokhovo is the nearest rural locality.
