= Grobovo =

Grobovo Гробово
- Selo
- Location within Zabaykalsky Krai Location within Russia
- Coordinates: 51°39′N 117°07′E
- Country: Russia
- Region: Zabaykalsky Krai
- District: Baleysky District
- Time zone: UTC+9:00

Grobovo (Russian: Гробово) is a rural locality (a selo) in Baleysky District, Zabaykalsky Krai, Russia. Population: 111 (2021 census); 133 (2010 census); 193 (2002 census); There are 3 streets in this selo.

== Geography ==
This rural locality is located 34 km from Baley (the district's administrative centre), 253 km from Chita (capital of Zabaykalsky Krai) and 5,504 km from Moscow. Aliya is the nearest rural locality.
