= Nizhneye Giryunino =

Nizhneye Giryunino Нижнее Гирюнино
- Selo
- Location within Zabaykalsky Krai Location within Russia
- Coordinates: 51°11′N 116°58′E
- Country: Russia
- Region: Zabaykalsky Krai
- District: Baleysky District
- Time zone: UTC+9:00

Nizhneye Giryunino (Russian: Нижнее Гирюнино) is a rural locality (a selo) in Baleysky District, Zabaykalsky Krai, Russia. Population: 157 (2021 census); 194 (2010 census); 248 (2002 census); There are 3 streets in this selo.

== Geography ==
This rural locality is located 49 km from Baley (the district's administrative centre), 260 km from Chita (capital of Zabaykalsky Krai) and 5,553 km from Moscow. Zhetkovo is the nearest rural locality.
