= Zhuravlyovo, Baleysky District, Zabaykalsky Krai =

Zhuravlyovo Журавлёво
- Selo
- Location within Zabaykalsky Krai Location within Russia
- Coordinates: 51°32′N 117°09′E
- Country: Russia
- Region: Zabaykalsky Krai
- District: Baleysky District
- Time zone: UTC+9:00

Zhuravlyovo (Russian: Журавлёво) is a rural locality (a selo) in Baleysky District, Zabaykalsky Krai, Russia. Population: 31 (2021 census); 48 (2010 census); 71 (2002 census); There are 2 streets in this selo.

== Geography ==
This rural locality is located 37 km from Baley (the district's administrative centre), 260 km from Chita (capital of Zabaykalsky Krai) and 5,522 km from Moscow. Nizhny Ildikan is the nearest rural locality.
