= Nizhny Kokuy =

Nizhny Kokuy Нижний Кокуй
- Selo
- Location within Zabaykalsky Krai Location within Russia
- Coordinates: 51°32′N 116°37′E
- Country: Russia
- Region: Zabaykalsky Krai
- District: Baleysky District
- Time zone: UTC+9:00

Nizhny Kokuy (Russian: Нижний Кокуй) is a rural locality (a selo) in Baleysky District, Zabaykalsky Krai, Russia. Population: 241 (2021 census); 308 (2010 census); 346 (2002 census); There are 4 streets in this selo.

== Geography ==
This rural locality is located 5 km from Baley (the district's administrative centre), 223 km from Chita (capital of Zabaykalsky Krai) and 5,484 km from Moscow. Novotroitsk is the nearest rural locality.
