= Baranovsk =

Baranovsk Барановск
- Selo
- Location within Zabaykalsky Krai Location within Russia
- Coordinates: 51°29′N 116°30′E
- Country: Russia
- Region: Zabaykalsky Krai
- District: Baleysky District
- Time zone: UTC+9:00

Baranovsk (Russian: Барановск) is a rural locality (a selo) in Baleysky District, Zabaykalsky Krai, Russia. Population: 126 (2010 census); 156 (2002 census); There are 4 streets in this selo.

== Geography ==
This rural locality is located 14 km from Baley (the district's administrative centre), 218 km from Chita (capital of Zabaykalsky Krai) and 5,484 km from Moscow. Novoivanovka is the nearest rural locality.
