= Unda, Zabaykalsky Krai =

Unda Унда
- Selo
- Location within Zabaykalsky Krai Location within Russia
- Coordinates: 51°42′N 116°55′E
- Country: Russia
- Region: Zabaykalsky Krai
- District: Baleysky District
- Time zone: UTC+9:00

Unda (Russian: Унда) is a rural locality (a selo) in Baleysky District, Zabaykalsky Krai, Russia. Population: 794 (2021 census); 959 (2010 census); 1,134 (2002 census); There are 17 streets in this selo.

== Geography ==
This rural locality is located 24 km from Baley (the district's administrative centre), 238 km from Chita (capital of Zabaykalsky Krai) and 5,482 km from Moscow. Yelkino is the nearest rural locality.
