= Butorino =

Butorino Буторино
- Selo
- Location within Zabaykalsky Krai Location within Russia
- Coordinates: 51°37′N 116°44′E
- Country: Russia
- Region: Zabaykalsky Krai
- District: Baleysky District
- Time zone: UTC+9:00

Butorino (Russian: Буторино) is a rural locality (a selo) in Baleysky District, Zabaykalsky Krai, Russia. Population: 90 (2021 census); 122 (2010 census); 169 (2002 census); There are 4 streets in this selo.

== Geography ==
This rural locality is located 9 km from Baley (the district's administrative centre), 229 km from Chita (capital of Zabaykalsky Krai) and 5,481 km from Moscow. Podoynitsyno is the nearest rural locality.
