= Leskovo, Baleysky District, Zabaykalsky Krai =

Leskovo Лесково
- Selo
- Location within Zabaykalsky Krai Location within Russia
- Coordinates: 51°44′N 116°55′E
- Country: Russia
- Region: Zabaykalsky Krai
- District: Baleysky District
- Time zone: UTC+9:00

Leskovo (Russian: Лесково) is a rural locality (a selo) in Baleysky District, Zabaykalsky Krai, Russia. Population: 61 (2021 census); 67 (2010 census); 82 (2002 census); There is 1 street in this selo.

== Geography ==
This rural locality is located 27 km from Baley (the district's administrative centre), 238 km from Chita (capital of Zabaykalsky Krai) and 5,478 km from Moscow. Unda is the nearest rural locality.
