= Yevgeni Glukhov =

Yevgeni Glukhov may refer to:

- Yevgeni Glukhov (footballer, born 1974), Russian football player
- Yevgeni Glukhov (footballer, born 1976), Russian football player
