= Belarusian Footballer of the Year =

Belarusian Player of the Year is a football award given annually since 1983 to the most outstanding Belarusian footballer. From 1983 to 1990 the voting was arranged by the newspaper Физкультурник Белоруссии (Fizkulturnik Belorussii). Since 1991 the voting is held by Belarusian newspaper Прессбол (Pressball). The votes are given by managers, coaches and captains of Belarusian full and U21 national teams, Belarusian Premier League clubs, Belarusian referees, football specialists, journalists and BFF workers.

== Winners ==
Year	Player	Club
1983	Sergey Gotsmanov	(Soviet Union) Dinamo Minsk
1984	Sergei Aleinikov	(Soviet Union) Dinamo Minsk
1985	Sergey Gotsmanov	(Soviet Union) Dinamo Minsk
1986	Sergei Aleinikov	(Soviet Union) Dinamo Minsk
1987	Sergey Gotsmanov	(Soviet Union) Dinamo Minsk
1988	Sergei Aleinikov	(Soviet Union) Dinamo Minsk
1989	Sergey Gotsmanov	(Soviet Union) Dinamo Minsk
1990	Aleksandr Metlitsky	(Soviet Union) Dinamo Minsk / (Socialist Federal Republic of Yugoslavia) Osijek
1991	Yury Kurbyko	(Soviet Union) Dinamo Minsk
1992	Andrei Zygmantovich	(Netherlands) Groningen / (Belarus) Dinamo Minsk
1993	Sergei Gerasimets	(Belarus) Dinamo Minsk
1994	Andrei Zygmantovich	(Spain) Racing Santander
1995	Valentin Belkevich	(Belarus) Dinamo Minsk
1996	Vladimir Makovskiy	(Belarus) Dinamo Minsk
1997	Andrei Lavrik	(Belarus) Dinamo Minsk
1998	Aleksandr Khatskevich	(Ukraine) Dynamo Kyiv
1999	Sergei Gurenko	(Russia) Lokomotiv Moscow / (Italy) Roma
2000	Aleksandr Khatskevich	(Ukraine) Dynamo Kyiv
2001	Gennady Tumilovich	(Russia) Rostselmash
2002	Alexander Hleb	(Germany) Stuttgart
2003	Alexander Hleb	(Germany) Stuttgart
2004	Maksim Romaschenko	(Turkey) Trabzonspor / (Russia) Dynamo Moscow
2005	Alexander Hleb	(Germany) Stuttgart / (England) Arsenal
2006	Alexander Hleb	(England) Arsenal
2007	Alexander Hleb	(England) Arsenal
2008	Alexander Hleb	(England) Arsenal / (Spain) Barcelona
2009	Aleksandr Kulchiy	(Russia) Rostov
2010	Yuri Zhevnov	(Russia) Zenit Saint Petersburg
2011	Alyaksandr Hutar	(Belarus) BATE Borisov
2012	Renan Bressan	(Belarus) BATE Borisov
2013	Timofei Kalachev	(Russia) Rostov
2014	Sergey Krivets	(Belarus) BATE Borisov / (France) Metz
2015	Ihar Stasevich	(Belarus) BATE Borisov
2016	Timofei Kalachev	(Russia) Rostov
2017	Mikhail Gordeichuk	(Belarus) BATE Borisov
2018	Ihar Stasevich	(Belarus) BATE Borisov
2019	Ihar Stasevich	(Belarus) BATE Borisov
2020	Maksim Skavysh	(Belarus) BATE Borisov
2021	Andrey Solovey	(Belarus) Gomel
2022	Uladzimir Khvashchynski	(Belarus) Minsk
2023	Max Ebong	(Kazakhstan) Astana
2024	Fyodor Lapoukhov	(Belarus) Dinamo Minsk
2025	Valery Gromyko	(Kazakhstan) Kairat

== Voting results ==
=== 2016 ===
Rank	Player	Club	Points
1	Timofei Kalachev	(Russia) Rostov	976
2	Andrey Gorbunov	(Greece) Atromitos	394
3	Ihar Stasevich	(Belarus) BATE Borisov	171
4	Mikhail Gordeichuk	(Belarus) BATE Borisov	147
5	Vitali Rodionov	(Belarus) BATE Borisov	128
6	Ivan Mayewski	(Russia) Anzhi Makhachkala	119
7	Alexander Hleb	(Belarus) BATE Borisov	115
8	Pavel Nyakhaychyk	(Russia) Orenburg	52
9	Syarhey Palitsevich	(Turkey) Gençlerbirliği	49
10	Sergei Kornilenko	(Russia) Krylia Sovetov Samara	41

=== 2015 ===
Rank	Player	Club	Points
1	Ihar Stasevich	(Belarus) BATE Borisov	664
2	Timofei Kalachev	(Russia) Rostov	400
3	Andrey Gorbunov	(Greece) Atromitos	382
4	Sergey Chernik	(Russia) BATE Borisov	257
5	Mikalay Yanush	(Belarus) Shakhtyor Soligorsk	169
6	Stanislav Dragun	(Russia) Krylia Sovetov Samara	144
7	Mikhail Gordeichuk	(Belarus) BATE Borisov	75
8	Nikita Korzun	(Belarus) Dinamo Minsk	67
9	Roman Vasilyuk	(Belarus) Dinamo Brest	38
10	Sergei Kornilenko	(Russia) Krylia Sovetov Samara	37

=== 2014 ===
Rank	Player	Club	Points
1	Sergey Krivets	(Belarus) BATE Borisov / (France) Metz	658
2	Egor Filipenko	(Belarus) BATE Borisov	332
3	Ihar Stasevich	(Belarus) Dinamo Minsk	318
4	Timofei Kalachev	(Russia) Rostov	242
5	Mikalay Yanush	(Belarus) Shakhtyor Soligorsk	123
6	Alexander Hleb	(Turkey) Konyaspor	96
7	Yuri Zhevnov	(Russia) Torpedo Moscow	75
8	Alyaksandr Karnitsky	(Belarus) BATE Borisov	63
9	Syarhey Balanovich	(Belarus) Shakhtyor Soligorsk / (Russia) Amkar Perm	53
10	Mikhail Gordeichuk	(Belarus) BATE Borisov	33

=== 2013 ===
Rank	Player	Club	Points
1	Timofei Kalachev	(Russia) Rostov	879
2	Vitali Rodionov	(Belarus) BATE Borisov	399
3	Yan Tigorev	(Russia) Lokomotiv Moscow	159
4	Alexander Hleb	(Belarus) BATE Borisov	147
5	Alyaksandr Martynovich	(Russia) Krasnodar	123
6	Egor Filipenko	(Belarus) BATE Borisov	107
7	Sergey Krivets	(Belarus) BATE Borisov	53
8	Anton Putsila	(Russia) Volga Nizhny Novgorod	53
9	Stanislav Dragun	(Russia) Krylia Sovetov Samara	44
10	Sergei Kornilenko	(Russia) Krylia Sovetov Samara	39

=== 2012 ===
Rank	Player	Club	Points
1	Renan Bressan	(Belarus) BATE Borisov	420
2	Vitali Rodionov	(Belarus) BATE Borisov	320
3	Alexander Hleb	(Russia) Krylia Sovetov Samara / (Belarus) BATE Borisov	285
4	Stanislav Dragun	(Belarus) Dinamo Minsk	235
5	Andrey Gorbunov	(Belarus) BATE Borisov	155
6	Sergey Veremko	(Russia) Krylia Sovetov Samara	153
7	Aleksandr Pavlov	(Belarus) BATE Borisov	116
8	Yan Tigorev	(Russia) Lokomotiv Moscow	98
9	Ivan Denisevich	(Belarus) Neman Grodno	59
10	Dmitry Osipenko	(Belarus) Shakhtyor Soligorsk	51
10	Nikolai Kashevsky	(Belarus) Gomel	51

=== 2011 ===
Rank	Player	Club	Points
1	Aleksandr Gutor	(Belarus) BATE Borisov	414
2	Alyaksandr Kulchy	(Russia) Krasnodar	313
3	Stanislav Dragun	(Belarus) Dinamo Minsk	270
4	Sergey Veremko	(Ukraine) Sevastopol / (Russia) Krylia Sovetov Samara	216
5	Pavel Nekhaychik	(Belarus) BATE Borisov / (Russia) Dynamo Moscow	127
6	Anton Putilo	(Germany) SC Freiburg	112
7	Timofei Kalachev	(Russia) Rostov	108
8	Sergei Kornilenko	(England) Blackpool / (Russia) Krylia Sovetov Samara	90
9	Sergei Omelyanchuk	(Russia) Terek Grozny	71
10	Yuri Zhevnov	(Russia) Zenit Saint Petersburg	50

=== 2010 ===
Rank	Player	Club	Points
1	Yuri Zhevnov	(Russia) Zenit Saint Petersburg	407
2	Aleksandr Kulchiy	(Russia) Rostov	330
3	Vitali Rodionov	(Belarus) BATE Borisov	297
4	Aleksandr Yurevich	(Belarus) BATE Borisov	282
5	Sergei Kornilenko	(Russia) Tom Tomsk / (Russia) Rubin Kazan	255
6	Pavel Nekhaychik	(Belarus) BATE Borisov	152
7	Anton Putilo	(Belarus) Dinamo Minsk / (Germany) SC Freiburg	144
8	Vladimir Yurchenko	(Belarus) Dnepr Mogilev	129
9	Anton Amelchenko	(Russia) Rostov	125
10	Aleksandr Martynovich	(Belarus) Dinamo Minsk / (Russia) Krasnodar	78

=== 2009 ===
Rank	Player	Club	Points
1	Aleksandr Kulchiy	(Russia) Rostov	811
2	Yuri Zhevnov	(Russia) Moscow	378
3	Sergey Krivets	(Belarus) BATE Borisov	254
4	Timofei Kalachev	(Russia) Krylya Sovetov Samara	218
5	Vitali Kutuzov	(Italy) Bari	65
6	Igor Shitov	(Belarus) BATE Borisov	63
7	Syarhey Kislyak	(Belarus) Dinamo Minsk	58
7	Alexander Hleb	(Spain) Barcelona / (Germany) Stuttgart	58
9	Aleksandr Yurevich	(Belarus) BATE Borisov	44
10	Roman Vasilyuk	(Belarus) Dinamo Brest	38

=== 2008 ===
Rank	Player	Club	Points
1	Alexander Hleb	(England) Arsenal / (Spain) Barcelona	624
2	Vitali Rodionov	(Belarus) BATE Borisov	466
3	Aleksandr Kulchiy	(Russia) Rostov	312
4	Sergey Veremko	(Belarus) BATE Borisov	166
5	Gennadi Bliznyuk	(Belarus) BATE Borisov	94
6	Sergey Krivets	(Belarus) BATE Borisov	92
7	Sergey Gurenko	(Russia) Lokomotiv Moscow	87
8	Yuri Zhevnov	(Russia) Moscow	61
9	Sergey Sosnovski	(Belarus) BATE Borisov	30
10	Dmitri Likhtarovich	(Belarus) BATE Borisov	20

=== 2007 ===
Rank	Player	Club	Points
1	Alexander Hleb	(England) Arsenal	818
2	Yuri Zhevnov	(Russia) Moscow	314
3	Roman Vasilyuk	(Belarus) Gomel	246
4	Maksim Romaschenko	(Russia) Torpedo Moscow	153
5	Aleksandr Kulchiy	(Russia) Tom Tomsk	106
6	Sergey Gurenko	(Russia) Lokomotiv Moscow	92
7	Vladimir Korytko	(Ukraine) Chernomorets Odessa	44
8	Vitali Kutuzov	(Italy) Parma / (Italy) Pisa	28
9	Vitali Rodionov	(Belarus) BATE Borisov	19
10	Dmitri Likhtarovich	(Belarus) BATE Borisov	9

=== 2006 ===
Rank	Player	Club	Points
1	Alexander Hleb	(England) Arsenal	711
2	Sergei Kornilenko	(Ukraine) Dnipro Dnipropetrovsk	422
3	Aleksandr Kulchiy	(Russia) Tom Tomsk	200
4	Sergey Gurenko	(Russia) Lokomotiv Moscow	133
5	Sergei Shtanyuk	(Ukraine) Metallurg Zaporozhye / (Russia) Luch-Energiya Vladivostok	102
6	Oleg Strakhanovich	(Belarus) MTZ-RIPO Minsk	57
7	Aleksandr Khatskevich	(Belarus) Dinamo Minsk	42
8	Maksim Romaschenko	(Russia) Dinamo Moscow	40
9	Timofei Kalachev	(Russia) Rostov	33
10	Aleksandr Klimenko	(Belarus) Shakhtyor Soligorsk	32

=== 2005 ===
Rank	Player	Club	Points
1	Alexander Hleb	(Germany) Stuttgart / (England) Arsenal	671
2	Denis Kovba	(Russia) Krylia Sovetov Samara	170
3	Vitali Kutuzov	(Italy) Sampdoria	146
4	Maksim Romaschenko	(Russia) Dinamo Moscow	141
5	Vasily Khomutovsky	(Romania) Steaua București	122
6	Sergei Shtanyuk	(Russia) Shinnik Yaroslavl	112
7	Yuri Zhevnov	(Russia) Moscow	103
8	Aleksandr Kulchiy	(Russia) Shinnik Yaroslavl / (Russia) Tom Tomsk	43
9	Roman Vasilyuk	(Israel) Hapoel Tel Aviv / (Belarus) Gomel	37
10	Vitali Volodenkov	(Belarus) Dinamo Minsk	36

=== 2004 ===
Rank	Player	Club	Points
1	Maksim Romaschenko	(Turkey) Trabzonspor / (Russia) Dinamo Moscow	637
2	Alexander Hleb	(Germany) Stuttgart	483
3	Sergey Gurenko	(Russia) Lokomotiv Moscow	174
4	Valentin Belkevich	(Ukraine) Dynamo Kyiv	154
5	Andrey Razin	(Belarus) Dinamo Minsk	108
6	Aleksandr Kulchiy	(Russia) Shinnik Yaroslavl	81
7	Sergei Shtanyuk	(Russia) Shinnik Yaroslavl	50
8	Vasily Khomutovsky	(Romania) Steaua București	30
9	Yuri Zhevnov	(Belarus) BATE Borisov	25
9	Yuri Shukanov	(Belarus) Dinamo Minsk	25

=== 2003 ===
Rank	Player	Club	Points
1	Alexander Hleb	(Germany) Stuttgart	784
2	Valentin Belkevich	(Ukraine) Dynamo Kyiv	458
3	Timofei Kalachev	(Belarus) Shakhtyor Soligorsk	246
4	Yuri Zhevnov	(Belarus) BATE Borisov	48
5	Gennadi Bliznyuk	(Belarus) Gomel	33
6	Aleksandr Kulchiy	(Russia) Shinnik Yaroslavl	29
7	Sergei Kornilenko	(Belarus) Dinamo Minsk	28
8	Vitali Volodenkov	(Belarus) Dinamo Minsk	19
9	Aleksei Baga	(Belarus) BATE Borisov	15
10	Maksim Romaschenko	(Turkey) Gaziantepspor / (Turkey) Trabzonspor	10

=== 2002 ===
Rank	Player	Club	Points
1	Alexander Hleb	(Germany) Stuttgart	559
2	Valentin Belkevich	(Ukraine) Dynamo Kyiv	379
3	Dmitri Likhtarovich	(Belarus) BATE Borisov	106
4	Maksim Romaschenko	(Turkey) Gaziantepspor	86
5	Aleksandr Khatskevich	(Ukraine) Dynamo Kyiv	48
6	Valery Strypeykis	(Belarus) Belshina Bobruisk	41
7	Vitali Kutuzov	(Italy) Milan / (Portugal) Sporting Lisbon	36
8	Sergey Gurenko	(Italy) Parma / (Italy) Piacenza	25
9	Valery Shantalosov	(Belarus) Torpedo-MAZ Minsk	22
10	Aleksandr Kulchiy	(Russia) Shinnik Yaroslavl	21

=== 2001 ===
Rank	Player	Club	Points
1	Gennady Tumilovich	(Russia) Rostselmash	360
2	Valentin Belkevich	(Ukraine) Dynamo Kyiv	264
3	Vitali Kutuzov	(Belarus) BATE Borisov / (Italy) Milan	235
4	Roman Vasilyuk	(Belarus) Slavia Mozyr / (Russia) Spartak Moscow	200
5	Aleksandr Khatskevich	(Ukraine) Dynamo Kyiv	109
6	Alexander Hleb	(Germany) Stuttgart	82
7	Vasili Baranov	(Russia) Spartak Moscow	43
8	Valery Shantalosov	(Belarus) Belshina Bobruisk	41
9	Vladimir Shuneiko	(Russia) Krylia Sovetov Samara	29
10	Aleksandr Lukhvich	(Russia) Torpedo Moscow	20
