= Sergei Serchenkov =

Sergei Serchenkov may refer to:

- Sergei Serchenkov (footballer, born 1969), Russian football player
- Sergei Serchenkov (footballer, born 1997), Russian football player
