= Bochkaryovo =

Bochkaryovo Бочкарёво
- Selo
- Location within Zabaykalsky Krai Location within Russia
- Coordinates: 51°40′N 116°50′E
- Country: Russia
- Region: Zabaykalsky Krai
- District: Baleysky District
- Time zone: UTC+9:00

Bochkaryovo (Russian: Бочкарёво) is a rural locality (a selo) in Baleysky District, Zabaykalsky Krai, Russia. Population: 53 (2021 census); 67 (2010 census); 84 (2002 census); There are 3 streets in this selo.

== Geography ==
This rural locality is located 17 km from Baley (the district's administrative centre), 233 km from Chita (capital of Zabaykalsky Krai) and 5,482 km from Moscow. Verkhny Kokuy is the nearest rural locality.
