= Tumilovich =

Tumilovich is a surname. Notable people with the surname include:

- Alina Tumilovich (born 1990), Belarusian rhythmic gymnast
- Gennady Tumilovich (born 1971), Belarusian football coach and former player
