= Baleiichthys =

Baleiichthys Temporal range: Middle Jurassic

Scientific classification
- Domain: Eukaryota
- Kingdom: Animalia
- Phylum: Chordata
- Class: Actinopterygii
- Division: Teleostei
- Genus: †Baleiichthys; Rohon, 1890

Species
- B. antingensis Liu, 1955; B. graciosa Rohon, 1890; B. lata Rohon, 1890

Extinct genus of fishes

Baleiichthys is a genus of extinct freshwater ray-finned fish, belonging to the teleosts. It lived in the Middle Jurassic, and its fossil remains have been found in northern Asia. Almost nothing is known about it.

== Description ==
Baleiichthys was small in size and had an elongated and slender body, up to 7 centimeters long. The head was low, with small eyes and rather large jaws. The dorsal fin was placed approximately halfway down the body, obliquely opposite the small anal fin, which was triangular in shape. The pectoral fins were small and fan-shaped. The caudal fin was slightly forked. The body was covered in rather thick scales, arranged in diagonal rows, with a serrated rear edge. There were numerous fringed fulcrums along the margins of the unpaired fins.

== Classification ==
Baleiichthys was described by Rohon in 1890, based on fossil remains found in formations dating back to the early-middle Jurassic in the Baleysky District in Siberia; the type species is Baleiichthys graciosa, but the slightly larger species B. lata also comes from the same sediments. Another species, B. antingensis, is known from the Middle Jurassic Anting Formation in Shaanxi Province, China.

Baleiichthys was previously thought to be a member of the pholidophoriforms, a large group of fishes at the base of the teleosts that are known to have ganoid scales. Subsequent research has found substantial differences between Baleiichthys and the Pholidophorus genus and related forms; currently Baleiichthys is considered an archaic representative of teleosts, outside the group of pholidophoriforms proper. Sepkoski (2002) incorrectly referred to it as a pachycormiform.
