= Bolshoye Kazakovo =

Bolshoye Kazakovo Большое Казаково
- Selo
- Location within Zabaykalsky Krai Location within Russia
- Coordinates: 51°44′N 117°01′E
- Country: Russia
- Region: Zabaykalsky Krai
- District: Baleysky District
- Time zone: UTC+9:00

Bolshoye Kazakovo (Russian: Большое Казаково) is a rural locality (a selo) in Baleysky District, Zabaykalsky Krai, Russia. Population: 139 (2010 census); 151 (2002 census); There are 5 streets in this selo.

== Geography ==
This rural locality is located 32 km from Baley (the district's administrative centre), 245 km from Chita (capital of Zabaykalsky Krai) and 5,486 km from Moscow. Kazakovsky Promysel is the nearest rural locality.
