= Matusovo =

Matusovo Матусово
- Selo
- Location within Zabaykalsky Krai Location within Russia
- Coordinates: 51°28′N 116°20′E
- Country: Russia
- Region: Zabaykalsky Krai
- District: Baleysky District
- Time zone: UTC+9:00

Matusovo (Russian: Матусово) is a rural locality (a selo) in Baleysky District, Zabaykalsky Krai, Russia. Population: 352 (2021 census); 443 (2010 census); 535 (2002 census); There are 7 streets in this selo.

== Geography ==
This rural locality is located 23 km from Baley (the district's administrative centre), 207 km from Chita (capital of Zabaykalsky Krai) and 5,474 km from Moscow. Sarbaktuy is the nearest rural locality.
