= Zhetkovo =

Zhetkovo Жетково
- Selo
- Location within Zabaykalsky Krai Location within Russia
- Coordinates: 51°18′N 117°00′E
- Country: Russia
- Region: Zabaykalsky Krai
- District: Baleysky District
- Time zone: UTC+9:00

Zhetkovo (Russian: Жетково) is a rural locality (a selo) in Baleysky District, Zabaykalsky Krai, Russia. Population: 31 (2021 census); 64 (2010 census); 82 (2002 census); There are 4 streets in this selo.

== Geography ==
This rural locality is located 40 km from Baley (the district's administrative centre), 257 km from Chita (capital of Zabaykalsky Krai) and 5,541 km from Moscow. Lozhnikovo is the nearest rural locality.
