= Sergey Gotsmanov =

Belarusian footballer

Sergei Gotsmanov
Personal information
- Full name: Sergey Anatolyevich Gotsmanov
- Date of birth: 27 March 1959 (age 67)
- Place of birth: Minsk, Belarusian SSR, Soviet Union
- Height: 5 ft 8 in (1.73 m)
- Position: Midfielder

Youth career
- 1967–1978: Trudovyye Rezervy

Senior career*
Years	Team	Apps	(Gls)
1978	Dinamo Brest	27	(2)
1979–1990	Dinamo Minsk	289	(31)
1990	Brighton & Hove Albion	16	(4)
1990–1991	Southampton	8	(0)
1991–1992	Hallescher FC	19	(4)
1992–1994	Dinamo Minsk	25	(10)
1994–1995	Dinamo-93 Minsk	5	(0)
1996–1999	Minnesota Thunder	13	(0)
Total		402	(51)

International career
1983–1984	USSR Olympic	6	(0)
1984–1988	USSR	31	(2)
1992–1993	Belarus	3	(1)
- * Club domestic league appearances and goals

Sergey Anatolyevich Gotsmanov (Belarusian: Сяргей Гоцманаў; Russian: Серге́й Анатольевич Гоцманов; born 27 March 1959) is a former Belarusian footballer who played as midfielder for the USSR in the 1980s.

== Playing career ==
=== Dinamo Minsk ===
Having spent most of his youth at Trudovyye Rezervy, he graduated to the FC Dinamo Minsk first team in 1979, where he was part of the team that won the Soviet championship in 1982 under manager Eduard Malofeyev.

He made his international debut against Finland on 15 May 1984 and, in his second international appearance on 2 June 1984, he came on as a substitute against England in a friendly at Wembley and scored the opening goal as the USSR won 2–0. In the UEFA Euro 1988, he was a member of the Soviet Union squad, appearing in two Group B games against Ireland and England; he also appeared in both the semi-final (when he was elbowed in the face by Italy's Ancelotti) and the final, where the Soviets were defeated 2–0 by the Netherlands, with goals from Ruud Gullit and Marco van Basten.

His exploits with both FC Dinamo Minsk and the USSR national team earned him the accolade as Belarusian Footballer of the Year four times (in 1983, 1985, 1987 and 1989); this feat was subsequently matched by Alexander Hleb.

=== In England ===
In February 1990, Gotsmanov joined Brighton & Hove Albion on a non-contract basis and scored four goals in 16 games for Albion, and in his short time at the Goldstone Ground he became something of a cult figure with the crowd. In one game he showed his class when he rounded the opposition goalkeeper and saluted to the fans in the South Stand before putting the ball in the net. Albion wanted to sign Gotsmanov permanently but could not compete with the terms offered by Southampton and the player moved to The Dell.

In August 1990, Southampton paid a fee of £150,000 for Gotsmanov's services and he was considered by some fans to have been signed just to keep Saints' other recent Soviet signing, Aleksei Cherednik, company. His chances with the Saints were limited and he struggled to oust Alan Shearer, Matt Le Tissier and Rod Wallace from the starting line-up. In his season with the "Saints" he only made 14 appearances in all competitions and failed to score.

=== Later career ===
In September 1991, he departed for German football where he spent a season with Hallescher FC before returning to Minsk, firstly with FC Dinamo Minsk, before moving to their sister team Dinamo-93 Minsk.

Following the break-up of the Soviet Union, he made three appearances for Belarus, scoring the first ever official goal in the history of the Belarus national team in his first appearance on 28 October 1992, a 1–1 draw with Ukraine. In the mid-1990s, he moved to the United States where he played for Minnesota Thunder.

His wife, Olga, was the Belarus national team gymnastics coach. He is currently resident in Woodbury, Minnesota, where he has coached in local youth football. His sons, Sasha Gotsmanov and Andrei Gotsmanov, are also professional footballers.

== Career statistics ==
=== International goals ===
No.	Date	Venue	Opponent	Score	Result	Competition
.	28 October 1992	Dinamo Stadium, Minsk, Belarus	Ukraine	1–0	1–1	Friendly match

== Honours ==
Dinamo Minsk

- Soviet Top League champion: 1982
- Belarusian Premier League champion: 1992–93, 1993–94
- Belarusian Cup winner: 1993–94

Soviet Union

- UEFA European Championship runner-up: 1988

Individual

- Belarusian Footballer of the Year: 1983, 1985, 1987, 1989
