= Aliya, Baleysky District, Zabaykalsky Krai =

Aliya Алия
- Selo
- Location within Zabaykalsky Krai Location within Russia
- Coordinates: 51°37′N 117°07′E
- Country: Russia
- Region: Zabaykalsky Krai
- District: Baleysky District
- Time zone: UTC+9:00

Aliya (Russian: Алия) is a rural locality (a selo) in Baleysky District, Zabaykalsky Krai, Russia. Population: 125 (2021 census); 171 (2010 census); 177 (2002 census); There are 2 streets in this selo.

== Geography ==
This rural locality is located 34 km from Baley (the district's administrative centre), 255 km from Baley (capital of Zabaykalsky Krai) and 5,508 km from Moscow. Nizhny Ildikan is the nearest rural locality.
