= Yuri Zhevnov =

Belarusian footballer (born 1981)

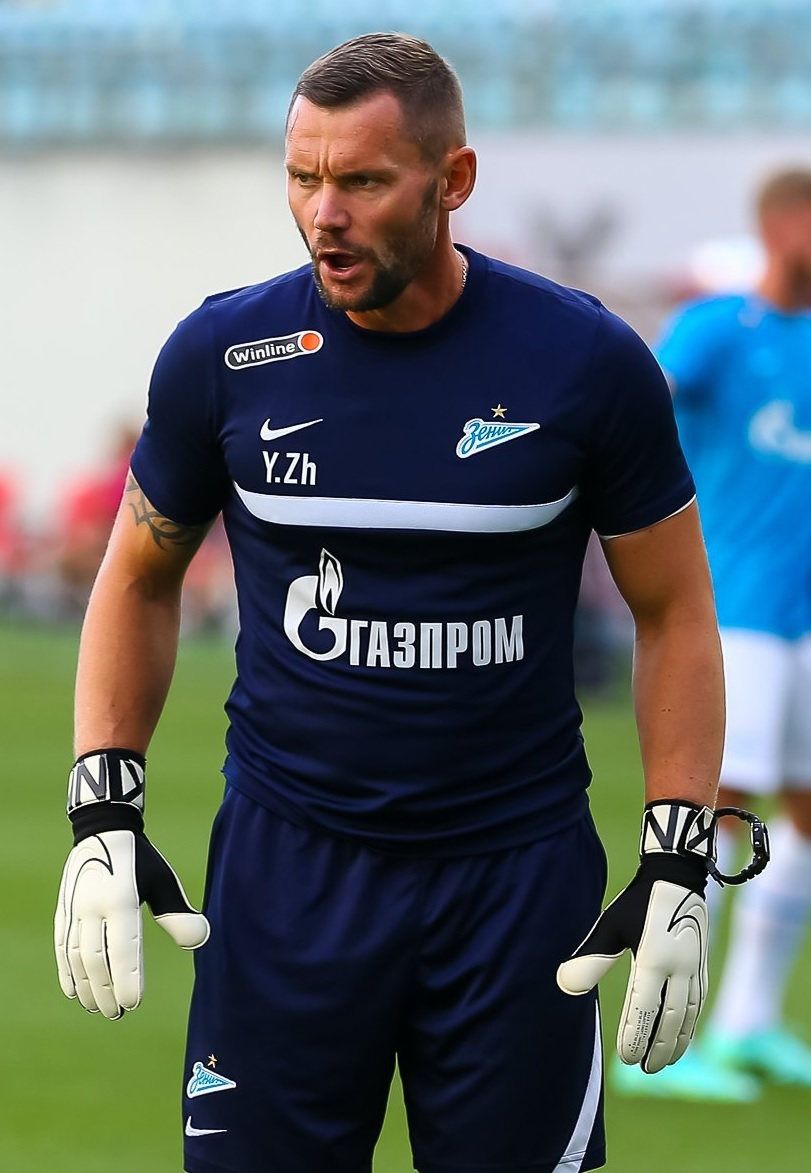
- Zhevnov working with Zenit in 2021

Personal information
- Full name: Yuri Vladimirovich Zhevnov
- Date of birth: 17 April 1981 (age 45)
- Place of birth: Dobrush, Belarusian SSR, Soviet Union
- Height: 1.80 m (5 ft 11 in)
- Position: Goalkeeper

Youth career
- 1996–1999: RUOR Minsk

Senior career*
Years	Team	Apps	(Gls)
1996–1999	RUOR Minsk	59	(0)
1998	→ Smena-BATE Minsk (loan)	5	(0)
2000–2004	BATE Borisov	80	(0)
2000	→ RShVSM-Olympia Minsk	2	(0)
2005–2009	Moscow	128	(0)
2010–2013	Zenit St. Petersburg	15	(0)
2014–2015	Torpedo Moscow	29	(0)
2015–2016	Ural Sverdlovsk Oblast	11	(0)

International career
1998	Belarus U17	6	(0)
1997–1999	Belarus U18	9	(0)
2000–2004	Belarus U21	41	(0)
2003–2015	Belarus	58	(0)

Managerial career
- 2017–2018: Belarus (assistant)
- 2018: Zenit St. Petersburg (assistant)
- 2019–2026: Zenit St. Petersburg (GK coach)
- * Club domestic league appearances and goals

Yuri Zhevnov (Belarusian: Юры Жаўноў; born 17 April 1981) is a Belarusian professional football coach and a former player who played as a goalkeeper.

== Club career ==
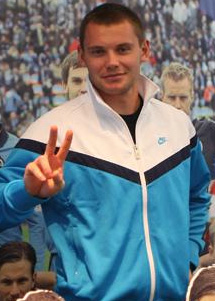
Zhevnov signing autographs in 2010

Zhevnov started his career in the third division. In 2000, he signed for BATE Borisov. During a 2004–05 UEFA Cup qualification match against Dinamo Tbilisi he scored a goal from his own half. In 2005, Zhevnov signed for FC Moscow. On 23 February 2010, he moved to Zenit Saint Petersburg from FC Moscow on a four-year deal.

== International career ==
Zhevnov is a former captain of the Belarus national team and made 58 appearances. On 3 September 2010, he captained Belarus to a surprise 1–0 victory over France at the Stade de France. "This is definitely one of the biggest wins in our history, but it's going to take a bit of time before we realise what we've done," said Zhevnov. "Victories give you strength and confidence, so we hope to build on this." Belarus have never appeared in a major tournament, and Zhevnov set qualification out of Group D for the UEFA Euro 2012 tournament as the team's primary goalkeeper.

== Personal life ==
He has Belarusian and Russian citizenships.

== Honours ==
BATE Borisov

- Belarusian Premier League: 2002

Zenit Saint Petersburg

- Russian Premier League: 2010, 2011–12
- Russian Cup: 2009–10
- Russian Super Cup: 2011

Individual

- Belarusian Footballer of the Year: 2010
