= Baley Airport =

Baley
- IATA: none; ICAO: none

Summary
- Airport type: Public
- Location: Balei
- Elevation AMSL: 2,136 ft / 651 m
- Coordinates: 51°34′0″N 116°42′0″E
- Interactive map of Baley

Runways
Direction	Length		Surface
Direction	ft	m	Surface
	6,069	1,850	Concrete

Baley (also given as Balei) is an inactive airport in Russia located 2 km east of Baley. It is a civilian airport with tarmac.

Google Earth image from late-2013 shows overgrowth starting on the runway and apron. Later imagery (up through 2018-08-10) show those plants continued to grow and have never been cleared. It is possible that the airport can still be used, but more likely service has been discontinued and the airport has been abandoned.

== See also ==
- List of airports in Russia
