= Zhidka =

Zhidka Жидка
- Selo
- Location within Zabaykalsky Krai Location within Russia
- Coordinates: 51°46′N 117°13′E
- Country: Russia
- Region: Zabaykalsky Krai
- District: Baleysky District
- Time zone: UTC+9:00

Zhidka (Russian: Жидка) is a rural locality (a selo) in Baleysky District, Zabaykalsky Krai, Russia. Population: 268 (2021 census); 308 (2010 census); 366 (2002 census); There are 7 streets in this selo.

== Geography ==
This rural locality is located 45 km from Baley (the district's administrative centre), 258 km from Chita (capital of Zabaykalsky Krai) and 5,495 km from Moscow. Ust-Yagye is the nearest rural locality.
