= Aleksei Vereshchak =

Russian footballer

Personal information
- Full name: Aleksei Anatolyevich Vereshchak
- Date of birth: 2 December 1976 (age 49)
- Place of birth: Tolyatti, Russian SFSR
- Height: 1.68 m (5 ft 6 in)
- Position: Midfielder

Youth career
- FC Lada Togliatti

Senior career*
Years	Team	Apps	(Gls)
1994	FC Neftyanik Pokhvistnevo	26	(2)
1995–2000	FC Lada Togliatti	164	(47)
2001–2002	FC Shinnik Yaroslavl	28	(4)
2002	FC Dynamo-SPb St. Petersburg	11	(1)
2003–2004	FC Tom Tomsk	32	(7)
2004–2006	FC Metallurg-Kuzbass Novokuznetsk	74	(12)
2007	FC Dynamo Barnaul	22	(5)
2008	FC Gazovik Orenburg	32	(1)
2009	FC Kyzylzhar	12	(1)
2009–2010	FC Metallurg-Kuzbass Novokuznetsk	36	(0)
2011–2012	FC Syzran-2003 Syzran	35	(3)
2012	FC Lada-Togliatti Togliatti	3	(0)
- * Club domestic league appearances and goals

Aleksei Anatolyevich Vereshchak (Russian: Алексей Анатольевич Верещак; born 2 December 1976) is a former Russian professional footballer.

== Honours ==
- Russian Second Division Zone Povolzhye top scorer: 1999 (27 goals).
