= Aleksei Zlydnev =

Russian footballer

Personal information
- Full name: Aleksei Nikolayevich Zlydnev
- Date of birth: 23 May 1980 (age 46)
- Place of birth: Smolensk, Russian SFSR
- Height: 1.76 m (5 ft 9 in)
- Positions: Midfielder; forward

Youth career
- 1986–1992: FShM Moscow
- 1992–1997: FC Spartak Moscow

Senior career*
Years	Team	Apps	(Gls)
1997–2000	FC Spartak Moscow	2	(0)
1997–2000	→ FC Spartak-d Moscow	81	(9)
2001–2002	FC Rostselmash Rostov-on-Don	21	(1)
2003	FC Uralan Elista	0	(0)
2004–2005	FC Oryol	72	(14)
2006	FC Terek Grozny	0	(0)
2009	FC Stavropolye-2009	8	(1)

International career
1999	Russia U-21	1	(0)
- * Club domestic league appearances and goals

Aleksei Nikolayevich Zlydnev (Russian: Алексей Николаевич Злыднев; born 23 May 1980) is a Russian former professional footballer.

== Club career ==
He made his professional debut in the Russian Third Division in 1997 for FC Spartak-d Moscow. He played 2 games for the main squad of FC Uralan Elista in the Russian Premier League Cup.

== Honours ==
- Russian Premier League champion: 1999.
- Russian Cup winner: 1998.
- Russian Cup finalist: 2003 (played in the early stages of the 2002/03 tournament for FC Rostselmash Rostov-on-Don).
