= Vyacheslav Vishnevskiy =

Russian footballer

Personal information
- Full name: Vyacheslav Nikolayevich Vishnevskiy
- Date of birth: 16 April 1977 (age 49)
- Place of birth: Tomsk, Russian SFSR
- Height: 1.72 m (5 ft 7 1/2 in)
- Position: Forward

Senior career*
Years	Team	Apps	(Gls)
1994	FC Tom Tomsk	14	(1)
1995	FC Uralmash Yekaterinburg	10	(0)
1995	→ FC Uralmash-d Yekaterinburg (loan)	8	(2)
1996	FC Metallurg Krasnoyarsk	10	(1)
1996–1998	FC Tom Tomsk	68	(13)
1999	FC Uralan Elista	15	(2)
1999	FC Baltika Kaliningrad	19	(2)
2000–2002	FC Volgar-Gazprom Astrakhan	65	(9)
2001	→ FC Saturn Ramenskoye	1	(0)
2002–2003	FC Tom Tomsk	44	(11)
2004	FC Anzhi Makhachkala	33	(3)
2005	FC Oryol	20	(6)
2005	FC Shinnik Yaroslavl	5	(0)
2006–2007	SC Tavriya Simferopol	24	(7)
2008	FC Yantar-Tom Seversk		
2010	FC Tomsk		
2011	FC KD Vostok Tomsk		
2011–2012	FC Kemerovo		
2012	FC KD Vostok Tomsk		
- * Club domestic league appearances and goals

Vyacheslav Nikolayevich Vishnevskiy (Russian: Вячеслав Николаевич Вишневский; born 16 April 1977 in Tomsk) is a former Russian football player.
