= Gennady Tumilovich =

Belarusian footballer (born 1971)

Gennady Tumilovich Геннадий Тумилович
Personal information
- Full name: Gennady Anatolyevich Tumilovich
- Date of birth: 3 September 1971 (age 55)
- Place of birth: Minsk, Belarusian SSR
- Height: 1.88 m (6 ft 2 in)
- Position: Goalkeeper

Youth career
- SDYuShOR-5 Minsk

Senior career*
Years	Team	Apps	(Gls)
1989–1990	Dinamo Brest	28	(0)
1991–1995	Dinamo Minsk	21	(0)
1992–1993	→ Belarus Minsk (loan)	37	(0)
1996	Metallurg Krasnoyarsk	11	(0)
1997	Zarya Leninsk-Kuznetsky	21	(0)
1998–1999	Zhemchuzhina Sochi	33	(0)
2000	Ironi Rishon LeZion	14	(0)
2000	Dynamo Moscow	9	(0)
2001–2002	Rostselmash	11	(0)
2003	Royal Antwerp	9	(0)
2004–2006	Luch-Energiya Vladivostok	25	(0)
2007	Dinamo Minsk	4	(0)

International career
1991	Soviet Union U20		
1998–2004	Belarus	32	(0)

Managerial career
- 2007: Dinamo Minsk (GK coach)
- 2007: Dinamo Minsk (director of sports)
- 2011–2013: Piter Saint Petersburg (assistant)
- 2013–2014: Luch-Energiya Vladivostok (GK coach)
- 2014–2016: Tosno (GK coach)
- * Club domestic league appearances and goals

Gennady Anatolyevich Tumilovich (Russian: Геннадий Анатольевич Тумилович; born 3 September 1971) is a Belarusian football coach and a former player.

== Club career ==
=== Belarus ===
Tumilovich started his career at FC Dinamo Brest of Soviet Second League. He then moved to the only club in Soviet Top League from Byelorussian SSR, the capital's FC Dinamo Minsk. After the independence, he played the first ever Belarusian First League, and followed the reverse team Dinamo-2 Minsk promoted to Belarusian Premier League. After a season with second team, he joined the first team in 1993–94 season.

=== Russia ===
In 1996, Tumilovich joined Metallurg Krasnoyarsk of Russian First Division. He then played for Zarya Leninsk-Kuznetsky, also in First League. In 1998, he joined Russian Premier League side Zhemchuzhina Sochi, and also played with their reserve team at Russian Second Division.

=== Israel ===
In 2000, he joined Hapoel Ironi Rishon LeZion, but returned to Russia for Rostov in the summer.

=== Belgium ===
In 2003, he moved to Antwerp. He returned to Russia again for Luch-Energiya Vladivostok of Russian First Division in 2004.

=== Belarus ===
In 2007, he moved back to FC Dinamo Minsk.

== International career ==
Tumilovich was a part of Soviet squad at 1991 FIFA World Youth Championship. Between 1998 and 2004 he has been capped 32 times for Belarus.

== Honours ==
Dinamo Minsk

- Belarusian Premier League: 1993–94, 1994–95

Individual

- Belarusian Footballer of the Year: 2001
