= Vitali Nidbaykin =

Russian footballer

Personal information
- Date of birth: 22 May 1961 (age 65)
- Place of birth: Bryansk, Russian SFSR
- Height: 1.85 m (6 ft 1 in)
- Positions: Forward; midfielder

Senior career*
Years	Team	Apps	(Gls)
1983–1985	FC Dynamo Bryansk	67	(14)
1986	FC Fakel Voronezh	6	(0)
1986–1991	FC Dynamo Bryansk	192	(41)
1992	FC Kuban Krasnodar	24	(4)
1993	PK-37	2	(0)
1993	Malax IF (Finland)	?	(9)
1994	FC Astrateks Astrakhan	20	(5)
1995	FC Orekhovo Orekhovo-Zuyevo	27	(1)
1996	FC UralAZ Miass	40	(4)
1999	Malax IF (Finland)	17	(2)
- * Club domestic league appearances and goals

Vitali Nidbaykin (Russian: Виталий Нидбайкин; born 22 May 1961) is a retired Russian professional footballer.

Nidbaykin played in the Russian Top League with FC Kuban Krasnodar.
