= Oleksandr Martsun =

Ukrainian footballer (born 1972)

Personal information
- Full name: Oleksandr Mykolayovych Martsun
- Date of birth: 15 August 1972 (age 54)
- Place of birth: Brovary, Ukrainian SSR
- Height: 1.83 m (6 ft 0 in)
- Positions: Defender; midfielder

Youth career
- FC Dynamo Kyiv

Senior career*
Years	Team	Apps	(Gls)
1990	FC Dynamo Bila Tserkva	8	(0)
1991–1992	SKIF Kiev		
1992–1993	FC Hart Borodianka		
1993–1994	FC Temp Shepetivka	32	(0)
1995	FC Baltika Kaliningrad	30	(1)
1996–1997	FC Kuban Krasnodar	48	(6)
1996	→ FC Kuban-d Krasnodar (loan)	6	(0)
1998	FC Baltika Kaliningrad	16	(0)
1999	FC Fakel Voronezh	10	(0)
2000	FC Gazovik-Gazprom Izhevsk	24	(4)
2001	FC Metallurg Krasnoyarsk	2	(0)
2002	FC Gazovik-Gazprom Izhevsk	3	(0)
2002–2003	FC Bucha		
2004	FC Yednist' Plysky		
2012	FC Borodianka		
- * Club domestic league appearances and goals

Oleksandr Mykolayovych Martsun (Ukrainian: Олександр Миколайович Марцун; born 15 August 1972) is a Ukrainian former football player.
