= Viktor Goncharov =

Russian footballer

Personal information
- Full name: Viktor Nikolayevich Goncharov
- Date of birth: 20 March 1976 (age 50)
- Place of birth: Moscow, Russian SFSR
- Height: 1.77 m (5 ft 9 1/2 in)
- Position: Midfielder

Youth career
- Krylia Sovetov Moscow

Senior career*
Years	Team	Apps	(Gls)
1995–1997	Spartak-d Moscow	90	(28)
1997–1999	Tyumen	77	(3)
2000	Khimki	29	(1)
2001	Dinamo Minsk	22	(3)
2002–2003	Khimki	12	(2)
2004–2005	Vostok Ust-Kamenogorsk	51	(2)
2006	Zorkiy Krasnogorsk		
- * Club domestic league appearances and goals

Viktor Nikolayevich Goncharov (Russian: Виктор Николаевич Гончаров; born 20 March 1976) is a former Russian football player.
