= Vitaly Popov =

Russian ice hockey player

- Born: August 7, 1992 (age 32); Magnitogorsk, Russia
- Height: 6 ft 1 in (185 cm)
- Weight: 185 lb (84 kg; 13 st 3 lb)
- Position: Forward
- Shot: Left
- Played for: Severstal Cherepovets; Avtomobilist Yekaterinburg; Amur Khabarovsk; HC Vityaz
- Playing career: 2011–2024

Vitaly Popov (born August 7, 1992) is a Russian ice hockey coach and former professional ice hockey forward. He is currently an assistant coach for Russkie Vityazi, the MHL affiliate of HC Vityaz. He last played with HC Vityaz of the Kontinental Hockey League (KHL). He formerly played in the KHL with Severstal Cherepovets, Avtomobilist Yekaterinburg, Amur Khabarovsk and Vityaz.
