= Oleg Pashinin =

Uzbekistani footballer (born 1974)

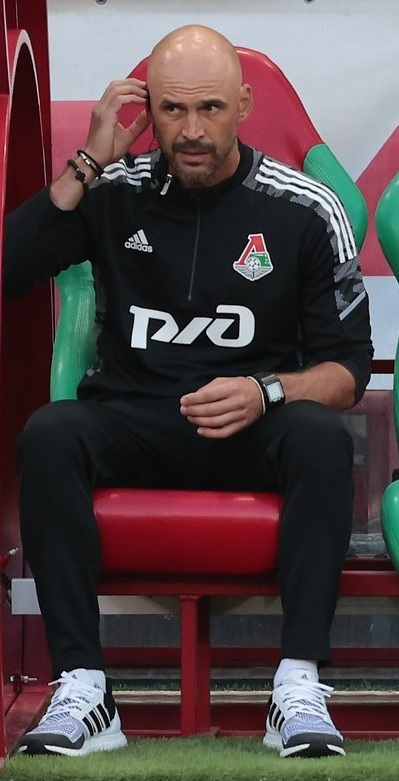
- Pashinin working with Lokomotiv Moscow in 2021

Personal information
- Date of birth: 12 September 1974 (age 52)
- Place of birth: Degtyanka, Russian SFSR
- Height: 1.85 m (6 ft 1 in)
- Position: Centre-back

Team information
- Current team: Lokomotiv Moscow (analyst)

Senior career*
Years	Team	Apps	(Gls)
1992–2007	FC Lokomotiv Moscow	202	(5)
2001	→ Sanfrecce Hiroshima (loan)	12	(2)

International career
2001–2005	Uzbekistan	12	(0)

Managerial career
- 2009: Lokomotiv-2 Moscow (assistant)
- 2009–2011: Lokomotiv Moscow (conditioning)
- 2011–2013: Lokomotiv-2 Moscow (assistant)
- 2014: Khimik Dzerzhinsk
- 2014–2022: Lokomotiv Moscow (assistant)
- 2016: Lokomotiv Moscow (caretaker)
- 2022–: Lokomotiv Moscow (analyst)
- * Club domestic league appearances and goals

Oleg Alekseyevich Pashinin (Russian: Олег Алексеевич Пашинин, born 12 September 1974) is a former footballer who had played for 15 seasons as a defender for Lokomotiv Moscow. After his retirement from playing, he began to work for the club as part of the coaching staff and is currently employed as a game analyst.

Born in Tambov Oblast, Russia to Russian parents, Pashinin, together with his Lokomotiv teammates Aleksey Polyakov and Vladimir Maminov, was invited to play international football for Uzbekistan by his compatriot Vladimir Salkov, who coached the team at the time.

== Coaching career ==
On 6 March 2022, Pashinin was appointed caretaker manager for Lokomotiv Moscow for the game against FC Khimki. For the next game, Dmitri Loskov returned to the position. On 5 April 2022, Lokomotiv announced that Pashinin left the coaching staff and would continue to work at the club in a different position.

== Career statistics ==
=== Club ===
Appearances and goals by club, season and competition
Club	Season	League			National cup (Note: Includes Russian Cup, Emperor's Cup)		League cup (Note: Includes Russian Premier League Cup,)		Europe		Total	
Club	Season	Division	Apps	Goals	Apps	Goals	Apps	Goals	Apps	Goals	Apps	Goals
Lokomotiv Moscow	1992	Top League	0	0							0	0
Lokomotiv Moscow	1993	Top League	9	0	1	0					9	0
Lokomotiv Moscow	1994	Top League	11	0							11	0
Lokomotiv Moscow	1995	Top League	14	0	1	0			1	0	16	0
Lokomotiv Moscow	1996	Top League	11	0	1	0			4	0	16	0
Lokomotiv Moscow	1997	Top League	15	0	2	0			3	0	20	0
Lokomotiv Moscow	1998	Top Division	10	0	1	0			2	0	13	0
Lokomotiv Moscow	1999	Top Division	25	1	1	0			6	0	32	1
Lokomotiv Moscow	2000	Top Division	11	0	3	0			3	0	17	0
Lokomotiv Moscow	2001	Top Division	1	0	1	0					2	0
Lokomotiv Moscow	2002	Premier League	23	0					9	0	32	0
Lokomotiv Moscow	2003	Premier League	19	0	1	0			10	0	30	0
Lokomotiv Moscow	2004	Premier League	13	0	4	0			2	0	19	0
Lokomotiv Moscow	2005	Premier League	18	1	1	0			7	0	26	1
Lokomotiv Moscow	2006	Premier League	20	0	2	0			3	0	25	0
Lokomotiv Moscow	2007	Premier League	3	0							3	0
Lokomotiv Moscow	Total		203	2	19	0			41	0	263	2
Sanfrecce Hiroshima (loan)	2001	J1 League	12	2	2	0	2	0	–		16	2
Career total			215	4	21	0	2	0	41	0	279	4

=== International ===
Appearances and goals by national team and year
National team	Year	Apps	Goals
Uzbekistan	2001	5	0
Uzbekistan	2002	0	0
Uzbekistan	2003	2	0
Uzbekistan	2004	2	0
Uzbekistan	2005	3	0
Total		12	0

== Honours ==
Lokomotiv Moscow

- Russian Premier League: 2002, 2004
- Russian Cup: 1996, 1997, 2000, 2001, 2007
- Russian Super Cup: 2003
- Commonwealth of Independent States Cup: 2005
