= Andrey Nedorezov =

Russian footballer and manager

Personal information
- Full name: Andrey Vladimirovich Nedorezov
- Date of birth: 7 October 1961 (age 65)
- Place of birth: Baley, Russian SFSR
- Height: 1.92 m (6 ft 3 1/2 in)
- Position: Defender

Senior career*
Years	Team	Apps	(Gls)
1987–2003	FC Lokomotiv Chita	479	(51)

Managerial career
- 2003: FC Lokomotiv Chita (assistant)
- 2004–2006: FC Chita (assistant)
- 2009: FC Chita (caretaker)
- 2010–2013: FC Chita
- 2013–2015: FC Chita (assistant)
- 2018–2019: FC Chita (assistant)
- * Club domestic league appearances and goals

Andrey Vladimirovich Nedorezov (Russian: Андре́й Влади́мирович Недоре́зов; born 7 October 1961) is a Russian professional association football manager and a former player.
