= Aleksandr Kolotilko =

Russian footballer

Personal information
- Full name: Aleksandr Anatolyevich Kolotilko
- Date of birth: 11 July 1979 (age 47)
- Place of birth: Nizhnekamsk, Russian SFSR
- Height: 1.86 m (6 ft 1 in)
- Position: Forward

Senior career*
Years	Team	Apps	(Gls)
1997–1998	FC Neftekhimik Nizhnekamsk	33	(6)
1998–2000	Bordeaux (B team)	16	(0)
2000	FC Neftekhimik Nizhnekamsk	14	(3)
2000–2002	Molenbeek	55	(22)
2002–2003	Charleroi	26	(4)
2003–2004	FC Neftekhimik Nizhnekamsk	46	(15)
2005–2006	FC Anzhi Makhachkala	40	(8)
2008	FC Neftekhimik Nizhnekamsk	13	(5)
2009–2010	FC Neftekhimik Nizhnekamsk	23	(3)

International career
1998	Russia U-21	1	(0)
- * Club domestic league appearances and goals

Aleksandr Anatolyevich Kolotilko (Russian: Александр Анатольевич Колотилко; born 11 July 1979) is a Russian former professional footballer.

== Club career ==
He made his Russian Football National League debut for FC Neftekhimik Nizhnekamsk on 23 May 1997 in a game against FC Anzhi Makhachkala. He played 6 seasons in the FNL for Neftekhimik and Anzhi.
