= Aleksandr Zaikin (footballer, born 1974) =

Russian footballer and coach

Personal information
- Full name: Aleksandr Yevgenyevich Zaikin
- Date of birth: 11 September 1974 (age 52)
- Place of birth: Ulyanovsk, Russian SFSR
- Height: 1.83 m (6 ft 0 in)
- Position: Forward

Team information
- Current team: FC Volga Ulyanovsk (assistant coach)

Senior career*
Years	Team	Apps	(Gls)
1991	FC Start Ulyanovsk	5	(0)
1992–1999	FC Lada-Simbirsk Dimitrovgrad	215	(59)
2000	FC Nosta Novotroitsk	10	(3)
2001–2003	FC Volga Ulyanovsk	83	(50)
2004	FC Sodovik Sterlitamak	17	(5)
2005	FC Mordovia Saransk	9	(2)
2005	FC Lada-SOK Dimitrovgrad	16	(6)
2006	FC Dynamo Kirov	6	(0)
2007–2008	FC Volga Ulyanovsk	36	(7)
2009	FC Volga-d Ulyanovsk (D4)		
2010	FC Volga Ulyanovsk	0	(0)

Managerial career
- 2010: FC Volga Ulyanovsk (administrator)
- 2020–: FC Volga Ulyanovsk (assistant)
- * Club domestic league appearances and goals

Aleksandr Yevgenyevich Zaikin (Russian: Александр Евгеньевич Заикин; born 11 September 1974) is a Russian professional football coach and a former player. He is an assistant coach with FC Volga Ulyanovsk.

== Club career ==
He played 6 seasons in the Russian Football National League for FC Lada Dimitrovgrad, FC Nosta Novotroitsk and FC Volga Ulyanovsk.

== Honours ==
- Russian Second Division top scorer: 1995 (Zone Center, 29 goals), 2002 (Zone Povolzhye, 25 goals).
