= Yevgeni Glukhov (footballer, born 1974) =

Russian footballer and official

Personal information
- Full name: Yevgeni Anatolyevich Glukhov
- Date of birth: 22 June 1974 (age 52)
- Height: 1.83 m (6 ft 0 in)
- Positions: Forward; midfielder

Youth career
- FC Kolos Nikopol

Senior career*
Years	Team	Apps	(Gls)
1991	FC Kolos Nikopol	2	(0)
1992–1993	FC Sirius Zhovti Vody		
1993	FC Niva Slavyansk-na-Kubani	27	(2)
1994–1995	FC AFK-UOR Mariupol		
1995	FC Kuban Petrovskaya		
1995–1996	FC Kuban Slavyansk-na-Kubani	36	(6)
1996–1997	FC Chernomorets Novorossiysk	18	(0)
1996	→ FC Chernomorets-d Novorossiysk (loan)	3	(0)
1997	FC Dynamo Stavropol	5	(0)
1997	→ FC Dynamo-d Stavropol (loan)	4	(2)
1998	FC Slavyansk Slavyansk-na-Kubani	34	(12)
1999	FC Kuban Krasnodar	28	(4)
2000	FC Spartak-Telekom Shuya	28	(5)
2002	FC Vityaz Krymsk	38	(12)
2003–2005	FC Zhetysu	70	(12)
2007	FC Molniya Nebug		
2008	FC Torpedo Armavir (amateur)		

Managerial career
- 2011: FC Slavyansky Slavyansk-na-Kubani (general director)
- 2014–2015: FC Krasnodar (U-21 team director)
- * Club domestic league appearances and goals

Yevgeni Anatolyevich Glukhov (Russian: Евгений Анатольевич Глухов; born 22 June 1974) is a Russian football official and a former player.
