= Sergei Serchenkov (footballer, born 1969) =

Russian footballer

Personal information
- Full name: Sergei Anatolyevich Serchenkov
- Date of birth: 11 January 1969 (age 57)
- Place of birth: Komsomolsk-on-Amur, Khabarovsk Krai, Russian SFSR
- Height: 1.76 m (5 ft 9 1/2 in)
- Position: Defender

Senior career*
Years	Team	Apps	(Gls)
1986–1987	FC Amur Komsomolsk-na-Amure	43	(0)
1988	FC SKA Khabarovsk	9	(0)
1990–1992	FC Amur Komsomolsk-na-Amure	55	(0)
1992–1993	Sportul Studentesc Chişinău	28	(0)
1994–1995	FC Kolos Krasnodar	75	(0)
1996	FC Lada Togliatti	14	(0)
1997	FC Kuban Krasnodar	2	(0)
1997	→ FC Kuban-d Krasnodar (loan)	1	(0)
1999	FC Kuban Krasnodar	3	(0)
1999	FC Neftyanik Kubani Goryachiy Klyuch		
2000	FC AES Yelimay Semey	22	(0)
- * Club domestic league appearances and goals

Sergei Anatolyevich Serchenkov (Russian: Сергей Анатольевич Серченков; born 11 January 1969) is a former Russian football player.
