= Eduard Bogdanov (footballer, born 1968) =

Russian footballer and coach

Personal information
- Full name: Eduard Vladislavovich Bogdanov
- Date of birth: 4 January 1968 (age 58)
- Place of birth: Elista, Russian SFSR
- Height: 1.69 m (5 ft 7 in)
- Positions: Midfielder; forward

Senior career*
Years	Team	Apps	(Gls)
1985–1986	FC Uralan Elista		
1987–1988	FC Dynamo-2 Moscow		
1988	FC Dynamo Moscow	0	(0)
1989	FC Uralan Elista	37	(6)
1990	FC Dinamo Sukhumi	0	(0)
1990–1992	FC Uralan Elista	73	(18)
1993	FC Chernomorets Novorossiysk	2	(0)
1993–1996	FC Uralan Elista	144	(47)
1997	FC Lokomotiv Chita	39	(9)
1998	FC Metallurg Lipetsk	17	(1)
1998	FC Neftekhimik Nizhnekamsk	20	(3)
2000–2002	FC Dynamo Stavropol	94	(27)

Managerial career
- 2003–2004: FC Uralan Elista (assistant)
- 2004: FC Uralan Elista
- 2005: FC Dynamo Stavropol
- 2006: FC Elista (assistant)
- 2013–2015: FC Elista (coach)
- * Club domestic league appearances and goals

Eduard Vladislavovich Bogdanov (Russian: Эдуард Владиславович Богданов; born 4 January 1968) is a Russian professional football coach and a former player.

== Playing career ==
He played for the main squad of FC Dynamo Moscow in the USSR Federation Cup.
