= Alyaksandr Kulchy =

Belarusian footballer (born 1973)

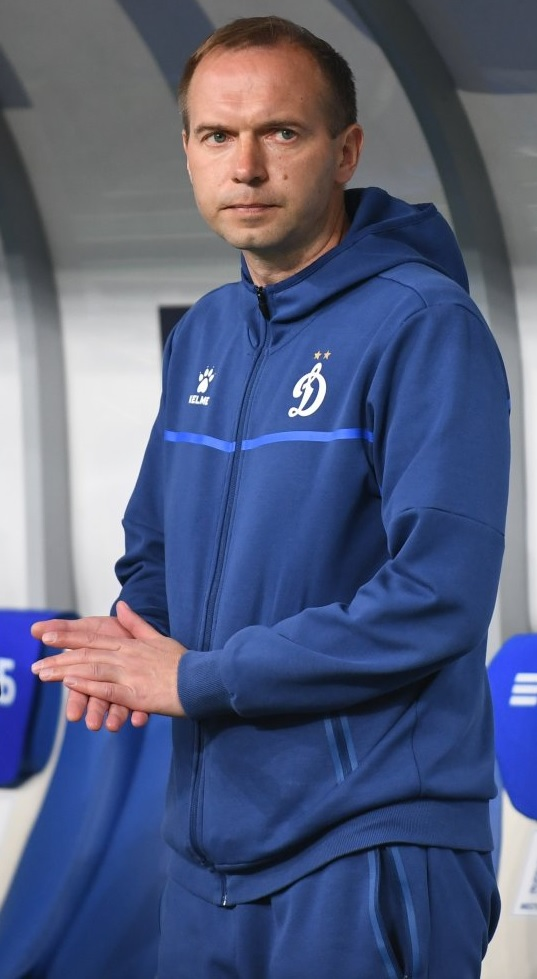
- Kulchiy managing Dynamo Moscow in 2020

Personal information
- Full name: Alyaksandr Mikalaevich Kulchy
- Date of birth: 1 November 1973 (age 52)
- Place of birth: Gomel, Byelorussian SSR, Soviet Union
- Height: 1.78 m (5 ft 10 in)
- Position: Defensive midfielder

Youth career
- DYuSSh Gomel

Senior career*
Years	Team	Apps	(Gls)
1991	Gomelselmash Gomel	20	(2)
1992–1993	Fandok Bobruisk	52	(4)
1994–1996	MPKC Mozyr	86	(30)
1997–1999	Dynamo Moscow	62	(4)
1997–1999	→ Dynamo-d Moscow	19	(7)
2000–2005	Shinnik Yaroslavl	149	(18)
2006–2007	Tom Tomsk	60	(4)
2008–2010	Rostov	84	(1)
2011–2012	Krasnodar	29	(1)
2012	Sibir Novosibirsk	15	(2)
2013	Irtysh Pavlodar	13	(0)
Total		589	(73)

International career
1992–1995	Belarus U21	16	(2)
1996–2012	Belarus	102	(5)

Managerial career
- 2014–2015: Belarus (assistant)
- 2016–2017: Dynamo-2 Moscow (assistant)
- 2018–2019: Gomel (assistant)
- 2019: Gomel
- 2020: Dynamo Moscow (U20)
- 2020–2023: Dynamo-2 Moscow
- 2020: Dynamo Moscow (caretaker)
- 2024: Murom
- 2025: Amkar Perm
- * Club domestic league appearances and goals

Alyaksandr Mikalaevich Kulchy (Belarusian: Аляксандр Мікалаевіч Кульчы; Russian: Александр Николаевич Кульчий; born 1 November 1973) is a Belarusian football manager and a former player. He is the all-time most capped player for the Belarus national team.

== International career ==
Kulchy earned his 100th cap for the Belarus national team on 7 June 2012, in a 1–1 friendly draw with Lithuania. He was part of the national team for nearly 16 years, from 1996 to 2012.

== Coaching career ==
On 29 September 2020, he was assigned caretaker manager of Dynamo Moscow following the resignation of Kirill Novikov. Dynamo won the only game against FC Krasnodar that he managed before Sandro Schwarz was appointed permanent manager on 14 October.

== Career statistics ==
=== Club ===
Appearances and goals by club, season and competition
Club	Season	League		
Club	Season	Division	Apps	Goals
Gomselmash Gomel	1991	Soviet Second League B	20	2
Fandok Bobruisk (Note: "Traktor Bobruisk" until 1992)	1992	Belarusian Premier League	12	1
Fandok Bobruisk	1992–93	Belarusian Premier League	32	3
Fandok Bobruisk	1993–94	Belarusian Premier League	8	0
Fandok Bobruisk	Total		52	4
MPKC Mozyr (Note: "Polesye Mozyr" until 1994)	1993–94	Belarusian First League	13	3
MPKC Mozyr	1994–95	Belarusian First League	28	9
MPKC Mozyr	1995	Belarusian Premier League	15	5
MPKC Mozyr	1996	Belarusian Premier League	30	13
MPKC Mozyr	Total		86	30
Dynamo Moscow	1997	Russian Premier League	26	3
Dynamo Moscow	1998	Russian Premier League	20	1
Dynamo Moscow	1999	Russian Premier League	16	0
Dynamo Moscow	Total		62	4
Shinnik Yaroslavl	2000	Russian First Division	34	4
Shinnik Yaroslavl	2001	Russian First Division	28	7
Shinnik Yaroslavl	2002	Russian Premier League	27	1
Shinnik Yaroslavl	2003	Russian Premier League	29	3
Shinnik Yaroslavl	2004	Russian Premier League	25	2
Shinnik Yaroslavl	2005	Russian Premier League	6	1
Shinnik Yaroslavl	Total		149	18
Tom Tomsk	2005	Russian Premier League	10	0
Tom Tomsk	2006	Russian Premier League	28	3
Tom Tomsk	2007	Russian Premier League	22	1
Tom Tomsk	Total		60	4
Rostov	2008	Russian First Division	31	0
Rostov	2009	Russian Premier League	28	0
Rostov	2010	Russian Premier League	25	1
Rostov	Total		84	1
Krasnodar	2011–12	Russian Premier League	29	1
Sibir Novosibirsk	2012–13	Russian National Football League	15	2
Irtysh Pavlodar	2013	Kazakhstan Premier League	13	0
Career total			570	66

=== International ===
Scores and results list Belarus' goal tally first, score column indicates score after each Kulchy goal.

List of international goals scored by Alyaksandr Kulchy
No.	Date	Venue	Opponent	Score	Result	Competition
1	27 May 1996	City Stadium, Molodechno, Belarus	Azerbaijan	2–1	2–2	Friendly
2	31 July 1996	Dinamo Stadium, Minsk, Belarus	Lithuania	1–1	2–2	Friendly
3	21 August 2002	Skonto Stadium, Riga, Latvia	Latvia	2–2	4–2	Friendly
4	22 November 2004	Mohammed Bin Zayed Stadium, Abu Dhabi, United Arab Emirates	United Arab Emirates	3–2	3–2	Friendly
5	30 March 2005	Arena Petrol, Celje, Slovenia	Slovenia	1–1	1–1	World Cup 2006 qualifier

== Honours ==
MPKC Mozyr

- Belarusian Premier League: 1996
- Belarusian Cup: 1995–96

Individual

- Belarusian Footballer of the Year: 2009

== See also ==
- List of men's footballers with 100 or more international caps
