= Sergei Gurenko =

Belarusian footballer (born 1972)

Sergei Gurenko Syarhey Hurenka
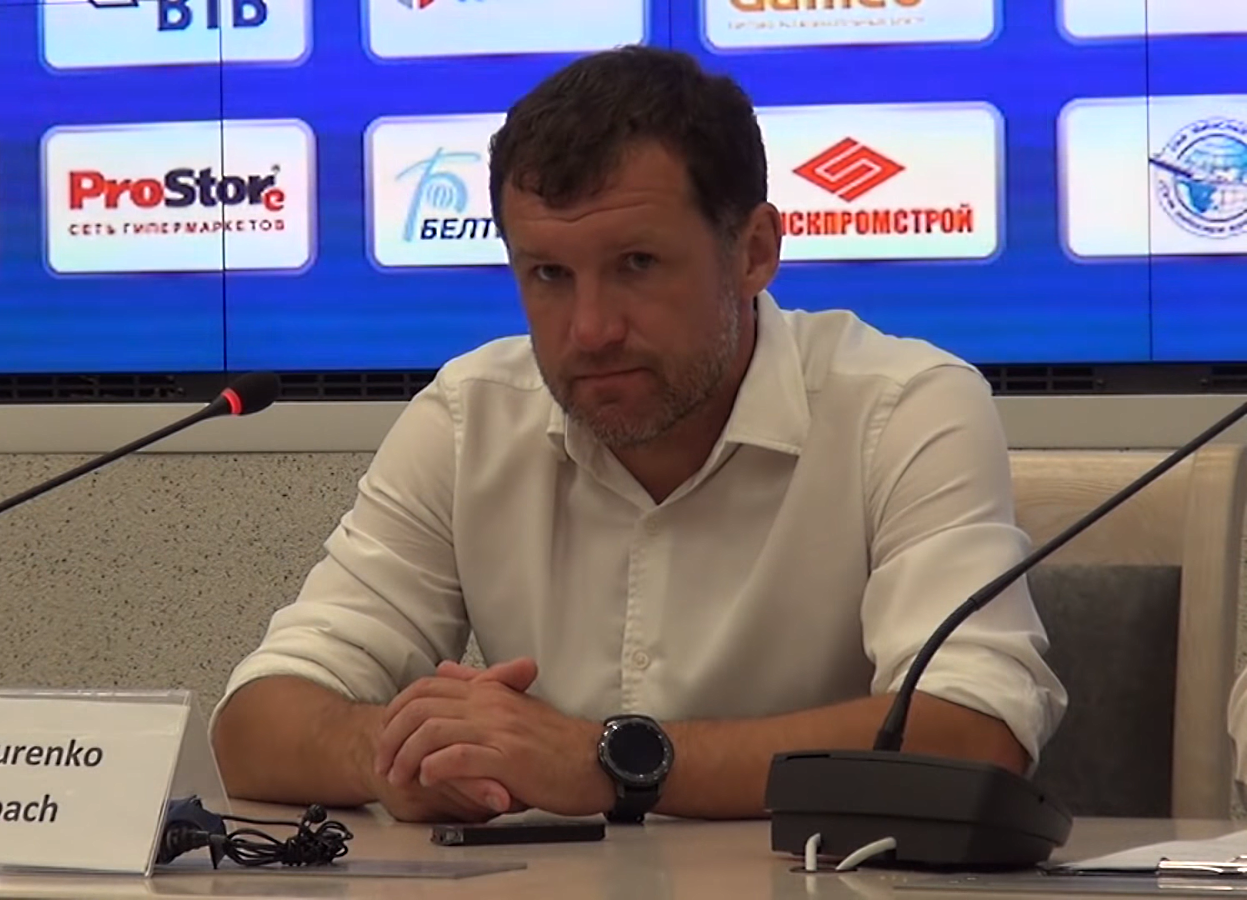
- Gurenko in 2018

Personal information
- Date of birth: 30 September 1972 (age 54)
- Place of birth: Grodno, Soviet Union (now Belarus)
- Height: 1.72 m (5 ft 8 in)
- Positions: Full-back; defensive midfielder

Team information
- Current team: Vitebsk (manager)

Senior career*
Years	Team	Apps	(Gls)
1989–1995	Neman Grodno	185	(5)
1995–1999	Lokomotiv Moscow	112	(4)
1999–2001	Roma	7	(0)
2000–2001	→ Zaragoza (loan)	11	(0)
2001–2002	Parma	11	(0)
2002–2003	Piacenza	25	(1)
2003–2008	Lokomotiv Moscow	113	(2)
2009	Dinamo Minsk	13	(0)
2014	Partizan Minsk	7	(0)
Total		484	(12)

International career
1994–2006	Belarus	80	(3)

Managerial career
- 2009: Dinamo Minsk (assistant)
- 2009–2010: Dinamo Minsk
- 2010–2012: Torpedo-BelAZ Zhodino
- 2012–2013: Dinamo Minsk (sporting director)
- 2013: Krasnodar (assistant)
- 2014: Spartak Nalchik (assistant)
- 2014–2015: Amkar Perm (assistant)
- 2015: Standard Liège (assistant)
- 2016–2017: Serbia (assistant)
- 2017–2019: Dinamo Minsk
- 2019–2020: Dinamo Minsk
- 2021: Riteriai
- 2021: Shakhtyor Soligorsk
- 2023: Ufa
- 2025–: Vitebsk
- * Club domestic league appearances and goals

Sergei Vitalyevich Gurenko (or Syarhey Hurenka; Belarusian: Сяргей Віталевіч Гурэнка, IPA: [sʲarˈɣʲɛj vʲiˈtalʲɛvʲid͡ʐ ɣuˈrɛnka]; Russian: Серге́й Вита́льевич Гуре́нко, IPA: [sʲɪrˈɡʲej vʲɪˈtalʲjɪvʲɪdʑ ɡʊˈrʲenkə]; born 30 September 1972) is a Belarusian football coach and former player who was a regular in the Belarus national team for nearly 12 years.

== Club career ==
In 1995, Gurenko was transferred to Russian Premier League side Lokomotiv Moscow. His outstanding skills and determination lead him to become one of the leaders of his side, and eventually he left his team for further challenge. In 1999, he became a player of Italian Serie A side A.S. Roma, which cost the club 10.58 billion Italian lire, but couldn't establish himself well there, playing in seven games for his club.

In the 2000–01 season he played for Spanish La Liga side Real Zaragoza, but didn't do well there too, participating in just 11 games and for the 2001–02 season he returned to Italy, playing for Parma AC, making 11 appearances that season.

In the summer of 2003, Gurenko returned to Lokomotiv Moscow, still managed by Yuri Syomin at the time. Despite his advancing age, he played for the team for five more years, alternating between several defensive positions such as a left-back, a right-back, and a defensive midfielder. At the conclusion of the 2006 season, he was named player of the season by the club's supporters.

On 8 December 2008, he moved back to Belarus to play for Dinamo Minsk and retired on 21 August 2009.

In 2014, he briefly joined Belarusian Second League club Partizan Minsk.

On 22 July 2006, Gurenko passed the milestone of 500 competitive games on the highest level, and became a member of the elite club of Sergei Aleinikov. In total, he has played in 612 matches for top league clubs.

== International career ==
Gurenko debuted for the Belarus national team on 5 May 1994, in a friendly against Ukraine and would eventually become the team captain. He ended his national team duty after a row with the manager during preparation for the WC qualifier against Moldova on 3 September 2005.

He is the second most capped Belarusian player, with 80 caps.

As part of the national team won 2002 LG Cup.

== Coaching career ==
After release of Slavoljub Muslin by Dinamo Minsk on 27 July 2009, Gurenko was named new Assistant Coach in the team of new head coach Kirill Alshevskiy. On 21 August 2009, Dinamo Minsk's club officials promoted him to the head coaching position. He replaced Kirill Alshevski.

In 2013, he worked as Slavoljub Muslin's assistant at Russian top division club FC Krasnodar.

On 4 February 2014, Gurenko was appointed an assistant manager at PFC Spartak Nalchik, where he reunited with former Lokomotiv teammate Khasanbi Bidzhiyev, appointed earlier as a head coach.

On 17 June 2023, Gurenko was hired as manager of Ufa. He was dismissed by Ufa on 28 August 2023 after Ufa started the league season with 1 win in 7 games.

== Career statistics ==
Scores and results list Belarus' goal tally first, score column indicates score after each Gurenko goal.

List of international goals scored by Sergei Gurenko
No.	Date	Venue	Opponent	Score	Result	Competition
1	20 August 1997	Dinamo Stadium, Minsk, Belarus	Sweden	1–0	1–2	1998 FIFA World Cup qualification
2	14 October 1998	Ninian Park, Cardiff, Wales	Wales	1–1	2–3	UEFA Euro 2000 qualifying
3	29 March 2003	Dinamo Stadium, Minsk, Belarus	Moldova	2–1	2–1	UEFA Euro 2004 qualifying

== Honours ==
Neman Grodno

- Belarusian Cup: 1992–93

Lokomotiv Moscow

- Russian Premier League: 2004
- Russian Cup: 1995–96, 1996–97, 2006–07
- Russian Super Cup: 2005

Real Zaragoza

- Copa del Rey: 2000–01

Parma

- Coppa Italia: 2001–02
