= FC Neftyanik Bugulma =

- Full name: Football Club Neftyanik Bugulma
- Founded: 1965
- Dissolved: 2001
- League: Amateur Football League, Zone Povolzhye
- 2000: 18th

FC Neftyanik Bugulma (Russian: «Нефтяник» (Бугульма)) was a Russian football team from Bugulma. It played professionally from 1965 to 1969 and from 1995 to 1997. Their best result was 2nd place in the Zone 5/RSFSR of the Soviet Second League in 1969.

== Team name history ==
- 1965–1969, 1993 FC Neftyanik Bugulma
- 1994–1996 FC Planeta Bugulma
- 1997–2000 FC Neftyanik Bugulma
