= FC Krasnogvardeyets Moscow =

- Full name: Football Club Krasnogvardeyets Moscow
- Founded: 1994
- Dissolved: 1999
- League: Amateur Football League, Zone Moscow, Group 2
- 1998: 8th

FC Krasnogvardeyets Moscow (Russian: «Красногвардеец» (Москва)) was a Russian football team from Moscow. It played professionally from 1995 to 1997. Their best result was 14th place in Zone 3 of the Russian Third League in 1996 and 1997.
