= Baley, Russia =

Town in Zabaykalsky Krai, Russia

Baley Балей
- Town
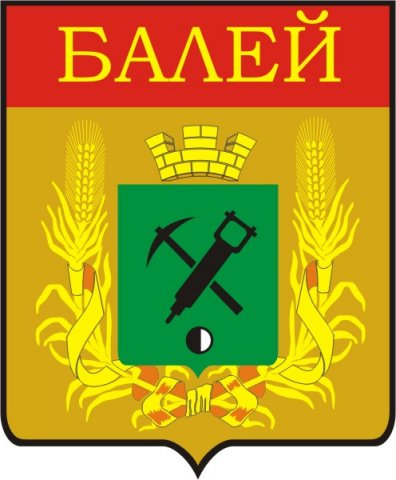
- Coat of arms
- Interactive map of Baley
- Location of Baley Baley (Zabaykalsky Krai)
- Coordinates: 51°36′N 116°38′E
- Country: Russia
- Federal subject: Zabaykalsky Krai
- Administrative district: Baleysky District
- Founded: 1736
- Town status since: 1938
- Elevation: 620 m (2,030 ft)

Population (2010 Census)
  - Total: 12,533
  - Estimate (January 2014): 11,835 (−5.6%)

Administrative status
  - Capital of: Baleysky District

Municipal status
  - Municipal district: Baleysky Municipal District
  - Urban settlement: Baley Urban Settlement
  - Capital of: Baleysky Municipal District, Baley Urban Settlement
- Time zone: UTC+9 (MSK+6)
- Postal codes: 673450, 673451, 673453, 673454
- Dialing code: +7 30232
- OKTMO ID: 76606101001

Baley (Russian: Балей) is a town and the administrative center of Baleysky District in Zabaykalsky Krai, Russia, located on the Unda River (Amur's basin), 350 kilometers (220 mi) east of Chita, the administrative center of the krai. Population: 12,533 (2010 census); 14,797 (2002 census); 23,898 (1989 Soviet census).

== History ==
Baley was granted town status and received its name in 1938, when the gold mining settlement of Novotroitsk was transformed.

The Baleylag prison camp of the gulag was constructed here to house prisoners used for mining the Tasseyevskoye gold deposits discovered in 1947.

== Administrative and municipal status ==
Within the framework of administrative divisions, Baley serves as the administrative center of Baleysky District, to which it is directly subordinated. As a municipal division, the town of Baley is incorporated within Baleysky Municipal District as Baley Urban Settlement.

== Economy ==
The town's economy remains reliant on gold mining, with numerous shafts, an open-cut mine, and processing facilities. Since 2004, exploitation of the gold deposits has been under the control of Canada company Barrick Gold.

=== Transportation ===
The town is served by the Baley Airport.
