= Baleysky District =

Baleysky District Балейский район (Russian)
- District
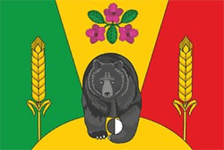
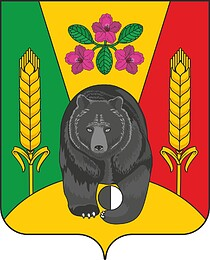
- Flag Coat of arms
- Location of Baleysky District in Zabaykalsky Krai
- Coordinates: 51°30′N 116°55′E
- Country: Russia
- Federal subject: Zabaykalsky Krai
- Established: February 11, 1935
- Administrative center: Baley

Area
  - Total: 5,000 km^{2} (1,900 sq mi)

Population (2010 Census)
  - Total: 20,500
  - Estimate (2018): 17,985 (−12.3%)
  - Density: 4.1/km^{2} (11/sq mi)
  - Urban: 61.1%
  - Rural: 38.9%

Administrative structure
  - Inhabited localities: 1 cities/towns, 31 rural localities

Municipal structure
  - Municipally incorporated as: Baleysky Municipal District
  - Municipal divisions: 1 urban settlements, 9 rural settlements
- Time zone: UTC+9 (MSK+6)
- OKTMO ID: 76606000
- Website: http://xn--80abnqi.xn--80aaaac8algcbgbck3fl0q.xn--p1ai/

Population of Baleysky District
- 2010 Census: 20,500
- 2002 Census: 9,720
- 1989 Census: 11,716
- 1979 Census: 12,430

Baleysky District (Russian: Балейский район) is an administrative and municipal district (raion), one of the thirty-one in Zabaykalsky Krai, Russia. It is located in the southern central part of the krai, and borders Nerchinsky District in the north, Shelopuginsky District in the east, Borzinsky District in the south, and with Olovyanninsky District in the west. The area of the district is 5,000 square kilometers (1,900 sq mi). Its administrative center is the town of Baley. As of the 2010 Census, the total population of the district was 20,500, with the population of Baley accounting for 61.1% of that number.

== History ==
The district was established on February 11, 1935.
