= 2003 FC Rubin Kazan season =

FC Rubin Kazan
2003 season
- Chairman: Farit Khabriyev
- Manager: Kurban Berdyev
- Stadium: Central Stadium
- Premier League: 3rd
- Russian Cup: Progressed to 2004 season
- Top goalscorer: League: Rôni (11); All: Rôni (11)

The 2003 FC Rubin Kazan season was the club's 1st season in the Russian Premier League, the highest tier of association football in Russia. They finished the season in third position, qualifying for the 2004–05 UEFA Cup, and reached the Round of 32 in the Russian Cup, with the Round of 16 taking place in the 2004 season.

== Squad ==
As of match played 5 November 2003

No.	Name	Nationality	Position	Date of birth (age)	Signed from	Signed in	Contract ends	Apps.	Goals
Goalkeepers
1	Sergei Kozko	(Russia)	GK	12 April 1975 (aged 28)	Torpedo-ZIL Moscow	2002			
16	Valeri Aleskarov	(Russia)	GK	19 August 1971 (aged 32)	KAMAZ	1997			
33	Aleksandr Petukhov	(Kazakhstan)	GK	11 January 1985 (aged 18)	Atyrau	2003		0	0
45	Pavel Kharchik	(Turkmenistan)	GK	5 April 1979 (aged 24)	Kristall Smolensk	2001			
Defenders
2	Levan Silagadze	(Georgia (country))	DF	4 August 1976 (aged 27)	Torpedo Kutaisi	2002			
3	Sergei Kharlamov	(Russia)	DF	22 June 1973 (aged 30)	Diana Volzhsk	2001			
5	Andrei Fyodorov	(Uzbekistan)	DF	10 April 1971 (aged 32)	Baltika Kaliningrad	2000			
6	Calisto	(Brazil)	DF	18 December 1975 (aged 27)	Bahia	2003		23	1
9	Andrei Streltsov	(Russia)	DF	18 March 1984 (aged 19)	Spartak Moscow	2003		3	0
21	Mikhail Sinyov	(Russia)	DF	21 June 1972 (aged 31)	Torpedo-ZIL Moscow	2002			
24	Jiří Novotný	(Czech Republic)	DF	7 April 1970 (aged 33)	Sparta Prague	2003		30	6
25	Pape Kebe	(Senegal)	DF	28 December 1979 (aged 23)	loan from ASC Diaraf	2003		2	0
26	Roman Sharonov	(Russia)	DF	8 September 1976 (aged 27)	Metallurg Krasnoyarsk	1999			
37	Lenar Gilmullin	(Russia)	DF	17 June 1985 (aged 18)	Youth Team	2003		0	0
44	Andrei Kolesnikov	(Russia)	DF	11 February 1984 (aged 19)	Dynamo Moscow	2003		0	0
Midfielders
7	Denis Boyarintsev	(Russia)	MF	6 February 1978 (aged 25)	Nosta Novotroitsk	2001			
10	Abdelkarim Kissi	(Morocco)	MF	5 May 1980 (aged 23)	MAS Fez	2002			
14	Andrei Konovalov	(Russia)	MF	13 September 1974 (aged 29)	Krylia Sovetov	2002			
15	Carlos Castro	(Costa Rica)	MF	10 September 1978 (aged 25)	Alajuelense	2003		6	0
18	Baye Gueye Ndiaga	(Senegal)	MF	20 October 1975 (aged 28)	loan from ASC Diaraf	2003		3	1
19	Andrés Scotti	(Uruguay)	MF	14 December 1975 (aged 27)	Nacional	2003		28	4
22	Tomáš Čížek	(Czech Republic)	MF	27 November 1978 (aged 24)	Sparta Prague	2003		27	2
28	Mindaugas Kalonas	(Lithuania)	MF	28 February 1984 (aged 19)	Dynamo Moscow	2003		0	0
35	Marat Akhmetzyanov	(Russia)	MF	10 March 1983 (aged 20)	Youth Team	2000			
36	Marat Khairullin	(Russia)	MF	26 April 1984 (aged 19)	Youth Team	2002			
40	Aleksandr Kukanos	(Russia)	MF	30 May 1983 (aged 20)	Khimki	2003		0	0
41	MacBeth Sibaya	(South Africa)	MF	25 November 1977 (aged 25)	Rosenborg	2003		25	1
43	Dmitri Michkov	(Russia)	MF	22 January 1980 (aged 23)	Servette	2003		7	2
47	Marat Valiyev	(Russia)	MF	10 May 1983 (aged 20)	Youth Team	2003		0	0
Forwards
11	David Chaladze	(Georgia (country))	FW	22 January 1976 (aged 27)	Skonto Riga	2002			
17	Rôni	(Brazil)	FW	28 April 1977 (aged 26)	Fluminense	2003		29	11
20	Oleg Nechayev	(Russia)	FW	25 June 1971 (aged 32)	Lada-Grad Dimitrovgrad	2002			
23	Ebrima Ebou Sillah	(The Gambia)	FW	12 April 1980 (aged 23)	Club Brugge	2003		12	2
27	Aloísio	(Brazil)	FW	27 January 1975 (aged 28)	Paris Saint-Germain	2003		6	0
31	Moustapha Mouhamadou Mané	(Senegal)	FW	19 January 1984 (aged 19)	AS Police	2003		0	0
34	Artyom Kozlov	(Russia)	FW	3 July 1983 (aged 20)	Youth Team	2002			
Away on loan
23	Wladimir Baýramow	(Turkmenistan)	FW	2 August 1980 (aged 23)	Metallurg Krasnoyarsk	2003		1	0
33	Dmitri Chigazov	(Russia)	GK	29 June 1983 (aged 20)		2003		0	0
Players that left Rubin Kazan during the season
4	Leandro Samarone	(Brazil)	DF	26 June 1971 (aged 32)	Krylia Sovetov	2002			
8	Gizo Jeladze	(Georgia (country))	MF	17 May 1975 (aged 28)	Baltika Kaliningrad	2002			
38	Vyacheslav Shchukin	(Russia)	FW	31 January 1984 (aged 19)	Youth Team	2000			
39	Andrei Borzenkov	(Russia)	FW	25 February 1986 (aged 17)	Youth Team	2003		0	0

=== On loan ===
Note: Flags indicate national team as defined under FIFA eligibility rules; some limited exceptions apply. Players may hold more than one non-FIFA nationality.

No. / Pos. / Nation / Player; 23 / FW / TKM / Wladimir Baýramow (at Terek Grozny)	No. / Pos. / Nation / Player; 33 / GK / RUS / Dmitri Chigazov (at Jūrmala-VV)

=== Left club during season ===
Note: Flags indicate national team as defined under FIFA eligibility rules; some limited exceptions apply. Players may hold more than one non-FIFA nationality.

No.	Pos.	Nation	Player
4	DF	BRA	Leandro Samarone (to Terek Grozny)
8	MF	GEO	Gizo Jeladze (to Sokol Saratov)

No.	Pos.	Nation	Player
38	FW	RUS	Vyacheslav Shchukin
39	FW	RUS	Andrei Borzenkov

== Transfers ==
=== In ===
Date	Position	Nationality	Name	From	Fee	Ref.
14 March 2003	MF	(South Africa)	MacBeth Sibaya	Rosenborg	Undisclosed	
Winter 2003	DF	(Brazil)	Calisto	Bahia	Undisclosed	
Winter 2003	DF	(Czech Republic)	Jiří Novotný	Sparta Prague	Undisclosed	
Winter 2003	DF	(Russia)	Andrei Kolesnikov	Dynamo Moscow	Undisclosed	
Winter 2003	DF	(Russia)	Aleksandr Kukanos	Khimki	Undisclosed	
Winter 2003	DF	(Russia)	Andrei Streltsov	Spartak Moscow	Undisclosed	
Winter 2003	MF	(Czech Republic)	Tomáš Čížek	Sparta Prague	Undisclosed	
Winter 2003	MF	(Costa Rica)	Carlos Castro	Alajuelense	Undisclosed	
Winter 2003	MF	(Lithuania)	Mindaugas Kalonas	Dynamo Moscow	Undisclosed	
Winter 2003	MF	(Russia)	Dmitri Michkov	Servette	Undisclosed	
Winter 2003	MF	(Uruguay)	Andrés Scotti	Nacional	Undisclosed	
Winter 2003	FW	(Brazil)	Rôni	Fluminense	Undisclosed	
Winter 2003	FW	(Senegal)	Moustapha Mouhamadou Mané	AS Police	Undisclosed	
Winter 2003	FW	(Turkmenistan)	Wladimir Baýramow	Metallurg Krasnoyarsk	Undisclosed	
Summer 2003	GK	(Kazakhstan)	Aleksandr Petukhov	Atyrau	Undisclosed	
Summer 2003	FW	(The Gambia)	Ebrima Ebou Sillah	Club Brugge	Undisclosed	
Summer 2003	FW	(Brazil)	Aloísio	Paris Saint-Germain	Undisclosed	

=== Out ===
Date	Position	Nationality	Name	To	Fee	Ref.
Summer 2003	DF	(Brazil)	Leandro Samarone	Terek Grozny	Undisclosed	
Summer 2003	MF	(Georgia (country))	Gizo Jeladze	Sokol Saratov	Undisclosed	

=== Loans in ===
Date from	Position	Nationality	Name	From	Date to	Ref.
	DF	(Senegal)	Pape Maguette Kebe	ASC Diaraf	End of Season	
	MF	(Senegal)	Baye Gueye Ndiaga	ASC Diaraf	End of Season	

=== Loans out ===
Date from	Position	Nationality	Name	To	Date to	Ref.
Winter 2003	GK	(Russia)	Dmitri Chigazov	Jūrmala-VV	End of Season	
Summer 2003	FW	(Turkmenistan)	Wladimir Baýramow	Terek Grozny	End of Season	

=== Released ===
Date	Position	Nationality	Name	Joined	Date
Summer 2003	FW	(Russia)	Andrei Borzenkov		
Summer 2003	FW	(Russia)	Vyacheslav Shchukin		
Winter 2004	MF	(Russia)	Marat Valiyev		
Winter 2004	FW	(Russia)	Artyom Kozlov		

== Competitions ==
=== Premier League ===
==== Results by round ====
Round	1	2	3	4	5	6	7	8	9	10	11	12	13	14	15	16	17	18	19	20	21	22	23	24	25	26	27	28	29	30
Ground	A	H	A	H	A	H	A	H	A	A	H	A	H	A	H	A	H	A	H	H	H	A	A	H	A	H	A	H	A	H
Result	L	W	D	W	L	D	D	W	D	L	W	L	W	D	W	D	D	W	W	W	W	W	L	W	D	L	L	W	W	W

Updated to match(es) played on 1 November 2003. Source: See Results
A = Away; H = Home; W = Win; D = Draw; L = Loss

==== Results ====
16 March 2003 1	CSKA Moscow	4 – 0	Rubin Kazan	Moscow
15:00 MSK (UTC+3)	Jarošík 18', 77'; Semak 43'; V.Berezutski (yellow card) 47'; Kusov (yellow card) 57'; Kirichenko 87'	Report	Sharonov (yellow card) 81'; Scotti (yellow card) 90'	Stadium: Dynamo Stadium; Attendance: 12,000; Referee: Yuri Chebotarev

22 March 2003 2	Rubin Kazan	1 – 0	Torpedo Metallurg	Kazan
16:00 MSK (UTC+3)	Novotný 10'; Chaladze (yellow card) 20'; Sharonov (yellow card) 64'	Report		Stadium: Central Stadium; Attendance: 10,000; Referee: Vladimir Vlasov

6 April 2003 3	Krylia Sovetov	0 – 0	Rubin Kazan	Samara
16:00 MSK (DST) (UTC+4)	Ovie (yellow card) 50'	Report	Samarone (yellow card) 19'	Stadium: Metallurg Stadium; Attendance: 28,000; Referee: Valery Shaveyko

12 April 2003 4	Rubin Kazan	4 – 0	Spartak-Alania Vladikavkaz	Kazan
16:00 MSK (DST) (UTC+4)	Rôni 29' (pen.), 78'; Novotný 44', 48'; Sibaya (yellow card) 51'; Kharlamov (yellow card) 72'; Scotti (yellow card) 77'	Report	Varziyev (yellow card) 73'	Stadium: Central Stadium; Attendance: 8,000; Referee: Taras Bezubyak

19 April 2003 5	Zenit St.Petersburg	1 – 0	Rubin Kazan	Saint Petersburg
16:00 MSK (DST) (UTC+4)	Radimov (yellow card) 23'; Šírl 48' (yellow card) 63'; Horák (yellow card) 62'	Report	Sibaya (yellow card) 21'; Scotti (yellow card) 31'; Čížek (yellow card) 53'; Sinyov (yellow card) 80'	Stadium: Petrovsky Stadium; Attendance: 21,000; Referee: Alexander Gonchar

23 April 2003 6	Rubin Kazan	0 – 0	Uralan Elista	Kazan
18:00 MSK (DST) (UTC+4)	Sibaya (yellow card) 90+'	Report	Geraschenko (yellow card) 10'; Ajinjal (yellow card) 40'; López (yellow card) 65'; Semochko (yellow card) 75'	Stadium: Central Stadium; Attendance: 10,000; Referee: Alexander Kolobaev

4 May 2003 7	Shinnik Yaroslavl	2 – 2	Rubin Kazan	Yaroslavl
17:00 MSK (DST) (UTC+4)	Kuchař 29'; Kulchy 70'; Vasilyev (yellow card) 86'	Report	Nechayev 14'; Novotný 89'	Stadium: Shinnik Stadium; Attendance: 9,000; Referee: Mikhail Veselovsky

10 May 2003 8	Rubin Kazan	3 – 1	Torpedo Moscow	Kazan
16:00 MSK (DST) (UTC+4)	Rôni 27' (pen.); Konovalov 52'; Kozko (yellow card) 62'; Boyarintsev (yellow card) 72'; Scotti 89'	Report	Budylin 14' (yellow card) 70'; Makhmutov (yellow card) 36'; Shirko (yellow card) 58'; Aristarkhov (yellow card) 90'	Stadium: Central Stadium; Attendance: 12,000; Referee: Yuri Chebotarev

18 May 2003 9	Dynamo Moscow	0 – 0	Rubin Kazan	Moscow
19:00 MSK (DST) (UTC+4)	Hanek (yellow card) 40'; Tochilin (yellow card) 44'; Bulykin (yellow card) 71'; Mendy (yellow card) 80'	Report	Konovalov (yellow card) 17'; Scotti (yellow card) 27' (yellow-red card) 89'; Sibaya (yellow card) 75'; Čížek (yellow card) 87'	Stadium: Central Dynamo Stadium; Attendance: 5,500; Referee: Sergey Timofeev

24 May 2003 10	Rotor Volgograd	3 – 1	Rubin Kazan	Volgograd
17:30 MSK (DST) (UTC+4)	Yesipov 14'; Olenikov 37'; Nizamutdinov 50'; Skrylnikov (yellow card) 54'	Report	Ndiaga 40' (yellow card) 47'; Novotný (yellow card) 55'	Stadium: Central Stadium; Attendance: 8,000; Referee: Alexander Kolobaev

31 May 2003 11	Rubin Kazan	1 – 0	Spartak Moscow	Kazan
16:00 MSK (DST) (UTC+4)	Sibaya (yellow card) 36'; Kissi (yellow card) 73'; Novotný 87'; Boyarintsev (yellow card) 90'	Report	Abramidze (yellow card) 32'; Smirnov (yellow card) 58'; Samedov (yellow card) 69'; Vashchuk (yellow card) 90'	Stadium: Central Stadium; Attendance: 22,000; Referee: Sergey Fursa

11 June 2003 12	Chernomorets Novorossiysk	1 – 0	Rubin Kazan	Novorossiysk
19:00 MSK (DST) (UTC+4)	Teryokhin 30'; Ayupov (penalty missed) 39' (yellow card) 40'; Mayorov (yellow card) 85'	Report	Kozko (yellow card) 39'	Stadium: Central Stadium; Attendance: 10,500; Referee: Sergei Frantsuzov

19 June 2003 13	Rubin Kazan	5 – 0	Rostov	Kazan
18:00 MSK (DST) (UTC+4)	Chaladze 7', 90'; Scotti 14'; Boyarintsev 56', 76'	Report	Morozov (yellow card) 13'; Booth (yellow card) 46'; Osinov (yellow card) 54'; Maksymov (yellow card) 82'; Shirshov (yellow card) 89'	Stadium: Central Stadium; Attendance: 5,000; Referee: Valery Shaveyko

23 June 2003 14	Saturn Ramenskoye	1 – 1	Rubin Kazan	Ramenskoye
19:00 MSK (DST) (UTC+4)	Bazayev 19'; Jović (yellow card) 88'	Report	Scotti 40'; Rôni (yellow card) 41'; Konovalov (yellow card) 89'	Stadium: Saturn Stadium; Attendance: 10,000; Referee: Mikhail Khodyrev

27 June 2003 15	Rubin Kazan	3 – 1	Lokomotiv Moscow	Kazan
18:00 MSK (DST) (UTC+4)	Rôni 45' (pen.), 47'; Scotti (yellow card) 46'; Novotný 56'	Report	Izmailov 22'; Pashinin (yellow card) 27'; Lekgetho (yellow card) 72'; Parks (yellow card) 85'	Stadium: Central Stadium; Attendance: 22,000; Referee: Alexander Evstigneev

7 July 2003 16	Lokomotiv Moscow	1 – 1	Rubin Kazan	Moscow
19:00 MSK (DST) (UTC+4)	Silagadze (yellow card) 24'; Rôni (yellow card) 81'; Sharonov 89'	Report	Sırxayev (yellow card) 24'; Buznikin 51'; Obradović (yellow card) 64'	Stadium: RZD Arena; Attendance: 3,500; Referee: Yuri Chebotarev

19 July 2003 17	Rubin Kazan	0 – 0	Saturn Ramenskoye	Kazan
16:00 MSK (DST) (UTC+4)	Calisto (yellow card) 12'; Scotti (yellow card) 82'	Report	Jović (yellow card) 11'; Régis (yellow card) 42'; Amoako (yellow card) 88'	Stadium: Central Stadium; Attendance: 18,000; Referee: Alexey Tyumin

26 July 2003 18	Rostov	0 – 1	Rubin Kazan	Rostov-on-Don
19:00 MSK (DST) (UTC+4)		Report	Sibaya (yellow card) 44'; Boyarintsev 76'	Stadium: Olimp-2; Attendance: 9,500; Referee: Sergey Zuev

2 August 2003 19	Rubin Kazan	3 – 1	Chernomorets Novorossiysk	Kazan
18:00 MSK (DST) (UTC+4)	Konovalov 29'; Chaladze 38'; Sharonov (yellow card) 53'; Nechayev 71'	Report	Cherkes (yellow card) 53'; Antyukhin 63'; Gordiyuk (yellow card) 87'	Stadium: Central Stadium; Attendance: 12,000; Referee: Valentin Ivanov

9 August 2003 20	Rubin Kazan	2 – 1	Dynamo Moscow	Kazan
16:00 MSK (DST) (UTC+4)	Rôni 25', 70'	Report	Hanek (yellow card) 3' (yellow-red card) 64'; Lutsenko (yellow card) 70' (goal) 87'	Stadium: Central Stadium; Attendance: 18,000; Referee: Igor Egorov

16 August 2003 21	Rubin Kazan	1 – 0	Rotor Volgograd	Kazan
18:00 MSK (DST) (UTC+4)	Chaladze 47'	Report		Stadium: Central Stadium; Attendance: 8,000; Referee: Mikhail Khodyrev

23 August 2003 22	Spartak Moscow	0 – 2	Rubin Kazan	Moscow
18:00 MSK (DST) (UTC+4)	Pavlyuchenko (yellow card) 67'; Danishevsky (yellow card) 71'; Kink (yellow card) 82'	Report	Rôni 19', 29'; Sharonov (yellow card) 54'; Sibaya (yellow card) 58'; Calisto (yellow card) 89'	Stadium: Luzhniki Stadium; Attendance: 5,000; Referee: Taras Bezubyak

1 September 2003 23	Torpedo Moscow	4 – 2	Rubin Kazan	Moscow
19:00 MSK (DST) (UTC+4)	Semshov 42'; Makhmutov (yellow card) 55'; Leonchenko 60' (pen.); Kormiltsev 63'; Shirko 71'	Report	Calisto 8'; Boyarintsev (yellow card) 49'; Scotti (yellow card) 87'; Sillah 90+'	Stadium: Luzhniki Stadium; Attendance: 4,000; Referee: Sergey Timofeev

13 September 2003 24	Rubin Kazan	1 – 0	Shinnik Yaroslavl	Kazan
16:00 MSK (DST) (UTC+4)	Boyarintsev 59'; Fyodorov (yellow card) 88'	Report	Vasilyev (yellow card) 38'	Stadium: Central Stadium; Attendance: 13,500; Referee: Igor Zakharov

20 September 2003 25	Uralan Elista	1 – 1	Rubin Kazan	Elista
18:00 MSK (DST) (UTC+4)	Ovshinov (yellow card) 46'; Gigiadze (yellow card) 77'; Passoni (yellow card) 85'; Ajinjal 90+'	Report	Boyarintsev (yellow card) 14'; Rôni 38'; Sinyov (yellow card) 45'; Calisto (yellow card) 76'	Stadium: Uralan Stadium; Attendance: 6,500; Referee: Valentin Ivanov

27 September 2003 26	Rubin Kazan	1 – 2	Zenit St.Petersburg	Kazan
16:00 MSK (DST) (UTC+4)	Sinyov (yellow card) 44'; Fyodorov (yellow card) 56'; Aloísio (yellow card) 59'; Novotný (yellow card) 86' (yellow-red card) 90'; Scotti 86'; Sharonov (yellow card) 89'; Sibaya (yellow card) 90'	Report	Arshavin (yellow card) 44' (yellow-red card) 90'; Nikolayev 47'; Makarov 70'; Spivak (yellow card) 88'	Stadium: Central Stadium; Attendance: 22,000; Referee: Valentin Ivanov

5 October 2003 27	Spartak-Alania Vladikavkaz	1 – 0	Rubin Kazan	Vladikavkaz
18:00 MSK (DST) (UTC+4)	Barasa (yellow card) 45'; Bazayev 53' (red card) 84'; Sarkisyan (yellow card) 75'	Report	Aloísio (yellow card) 9'; Konovalov (yellow card) 67' (yellow-red card) 85'; Sinyov (yellow card) 73'; Ndiaga (yellow card) 88'	Stadium: Republican Spartak Stadium; Attendance: 25,000; Referee: Sergey Zuev

18 October 2003 28	Rubin Kazan	3 – 1	Krylia Sovetov	Kazan
16:00 MSK (DST) (UTC+4)	Boyarintsev 13', 49' (yellow card) 30'; Fyodorov 42' (yellow card) 59'	Report	Polyakov (yellow card) 16'; Karyaka (yellow card) 28'; Koroman (yellow card) 30'; Souza (yellow card) 45' (goal) 60'; Wright (yellow card) 71'	Stadium: Central Stadium; Attendance: 12,000; Referee: Sergey Fursa

25 October 2003 29	Torpedo Metallurg	1 – 2	Rubin Kazan	Moscow
16:00 MSK (DST) (UTC+4)	Bracamonte 10' (yellow card) 85'; Pinto (yellow card) 82'	Report	Sibaya 15'; Sillah 72' (yellow card) 86'	Stadium: Eduard Streltsov Stadium; Attendance: 2,500; Referee: Alexander Evstigneev

1 November 2003 30	Rubin Kazan	3 – 2	CSKA Moscow	Kazan
16:00 MSK (UTC+3)	Čížek (yellow card) 64'; Rôni 73' (pen.); Boyarintsev 88'; Yevsikov 90' (o.g.)	Report	Scotti 36' (o.g.); Mandrykin (yellow card) 72'; Kirichenko 78'; Shershun (yellow card) 88'	Stadium: Central Stadium; Attendance: 22,000; Referee: Yuri Chebotarev

==== League table ====
Pos	Team	Pld	W	D	L	GF	GA	GD	Pts	Qualification or relegation
1	CSKA Moscow (C)	30	17	8	5	56	32	+24	59	Qualification to Champions League second qualifying round
2	Zenit St. Petersburg	30	16	8	6	48	32	+16	56	Qualification to UEFA Cup second qualifying round
3	Rubin Kazan	30	15	8	7	44	29	+15	53	Qualification to UEFA Cup second qualifying round
4	Lokomotiv Moscow	30	15	7	8	54	33	+21	52	
5	Shinnik Yaroslavl	30	12	11	7	43	34	+9	47	Qualification to Intertoto Cup second round

Source: RFPL
Rules for classification: 1st points; 2nd matches won; 3rd head-to-head (points, matches won, goal difference, goals scored, away goals scored); 4th goal difference
(C) Champions

=== Russian Cup ===
==== 2003-04 ====
14 October 2003 Round of 32 1st leg	Dynamo St.Petersburg	0 – 4	Rubin Kazan	Saint Petersburg
19:00 MSK (DST) (UTC+4)	Čížek 12'; Nechayev 25'; Boyarintsev 55', 90'	Report	Fedotov (yellow card) 45'	Stadium: Petrovsky Stadium; Attendance: 2,000; Referee: Valery Shaveyko

5 November 2003 Round of 32 2nd leg	Rubin Kazan	2 – 1 (6 – 1 agg.)	Dynamo St.Petersburg	Kazan
18:30 MSK (UTC+3)	Silagadze (yellow card) 72'; Michkov 78' (pen.); Boyarintsev 82'	Report	Fedotov (yellow card) 45'; Filippenkov 72' (pen.)	Stadium: Central Stadium; Attendance: 5,000; Referee: Mikhail Khodyrev

The Round of 16 games took place during the 2004 season.

== Squad statistics ==
As of match played 5 November 2003

=== Appearances and goals ===
No.	Pos	Nat	Player	Total		Premier League		Russian Cup	
No.	Pos	Nat	Player	Apps	Goals	Apps	Goals	Apps	Goals
1	GK	(Russia) RUS	Sergei Kozko	24	0	24	0	0	0
2	DF	(Georgia (country)) GEO	Levan Silagadze	14	0	8+4	0	2	0
3	DF	(Russia) RUS	Sergei Kharlamov	7	0	6+1	0	0	0
5	DF	(Uzbekistan) UZB	Andrei Fyodorov	18	1	11+6	1	1	0
6	DF	(Brazil) BRA	Calisto	23	1	21+2	1	0	0
7	MF	(Russia) RUS	Denis Boyarintsev	30	10	28	7	2	3
9	DF	(Russia) RUS	Andrei Streltsov	3	0	0+1	0	1+1	0
10	MF	(Morocco) MAR	Abdelkarim Kissi	7	0	3+2	0	1+1	0
11	FW	(Georgia (country)) GEO	David Chaladze	21	3	13+7	3	0+1	0
14	MF	(Russia) RUS	Andrei Konovalov	24	2	18+5	2	1	0
15	MF	(Costa Rica) CRC	Carlos Castro	6	0	0+4	0	2	0
16	GK	(Russia) RUS	Valeri Aleskarov	2	0	2	0	0	0
17	FW	(Brazil) BRA	Rôni	29	11	28+1	11	0	0
18	MF	(Senegal) SEN	Baye Gueye Ndiaga	3	1	1+1	1	0+1	0
19	MF	(Uruguay) URU	Andrés Scotti	28	4	27	4	1	0
20	FW	(Russia) RUS	Oleg Nechayev	27	3	9+16	2	2	1
21	DF	(Russia) RUS	Mikhail Sinyov	28	0	27	0	1	0
22	MF	(Czech Republic) CZE	Tomáš Čížek	27	2	8+17	1	2	1
23	FW	(The Gambia) GAM	Ebrima Ebou Sillah	12	2	7+5	2	0	0
24	DF	(Russia) RUS	Jiří Novotný	30	6	29	6	1	0
25	DF	(Senegal) SEN	Pape Kebe	2	0	1	0	0+1	0
26	DF	(Russia) RUS	Roman Sharonov	19	1	17+1	1	0+1	0
27	FW	(Brazil) BRA	Aloísio	6	0	4+2	0	0	0
41	MF	(South Africa) RSA	MacBeth Sibaya	25	1	23+1	1	1	0
43	MF	(Russia) RUS	Dmitri Michkov	7	2	2+3	1	2	1
45	GK	(Turkmenistan) TKM	Pavel Kharchik	6	0	4	0	2	0
Players away from the club on loan:
23	FW	(Turkmenistan) TKM	Wladimir Baýramow	1	0	0+1	0	0	0
Players who appeared for Rubin Kazan but left during the season:
4	DF	(Brazil) BRA	Leandro Samarone	9	0	9	0	0	0

=== Goal scorers ===
Place	Position	Nation	Number	Name	Premier League	Russian Cup	Total
1	FW	(Brazil)	17	Rôni	11	0	11
2	MF	(Russia)	7	Denis Boyarintsev	7	3	10
3	DF	(Czech Republic)	24	Jiří Novotný	6	0	6
4	MF	(Uruguay)	19	Andrés Scotti	4	0	4
5	FW	(Georgia (country))	11	David Chaladze	3	0	3
5	FW	(Russia)	20	Oleg Nechayev	2	1	3
7	FW	(The Gambia)	23	Ebrima Ebou Sillah	2	0	2
7	MF	(Russia)	14	Andrei Konovalov	2	0	2
7	MF	(Czech Republic)	22	Tomáš Čížek	1	1	2
10	MF	(South Africa)	41	MacBeth Sibaya	1	0	1
10	MF	(Senegal)	18	Baye Gueye Ndiaga	1	0	1
10	DF	(Brazil)	6	Calisto	1	0	1
10	DF	(Russia)	26	Roman Sharonov	1	0	1
10	DF	(Uzbekistan)	5	Andrei Fyodorov	1	0	1
10	MF	(Russia)	43	Dmitri Michkov	0	1	1
10				Own goal	1	0	1
Total					44	6	50

=== Disciplinary record ===
Number	Nation	Position	Name	Premier League		Russian Cup		Total	
Number	Nation	Position	Name	Booked	Sent off (straight red)	Booked	Sent off (straight red)	Booked	Sent off (straight red)
1	(Russia)	GK	Sergei Kozko	2	0	0	0	2	0
2	(Georgia (country))	DF	Levan Silagadze	1	0	1	0	2	0
3	(Russia)	DF	Sergei Kharlamov	1	0	0	0	1	0
5	(Uzbekistan)	DF	Andrei Fyodorov	3	0	0	0	3	0
6	(Brazil)	DF	Calisto	3	0	0	0	3	0
7	(Russia)	MF	Denis Boyarintsev	5	0	0	0	5	0
10	(Morocco)	MF	Abdelkarim Kissi	1	0	0	0	1	0
11	(Georgia (country))	FW	David Chaladze	1	0	0	0	1	0
14	(Russia)	MF	Andrei Konovalov	3	1	0	0	3	1
17	(Brazil)	FW	Rôni	2	0	0	0	2	0
18	(Senegal)	MF	Baye Gueye Ndiaga	2	0	0	0	2	0
19	(Uruguay)	MF	Andrés Scotti	7	1	0	0	7	1
21	(Russia)	DF	Mikhail Sinyov	4	0	0	0	4	0
22	(Czech Republic)	MF	Tomáš Čížek	3	0	0	0	3	0
23	(The Gambia)	FW	Ebrima Ebou Sillah	1	0	0	0	1	0
24	(Czech Republic)	DF	Jiří Novotný	2	1	0	0	2	1
26	(Russia)	DF	Roman Sharonov	5	0	0	0	5	0
27	(Brazil)	FW	Aloísio	2	0	0	0	2	0
41	(South Africa)	MF	MacBeth Sibaya	8	0	0	0	8	0
Players away on loan:
Players who left Rubin Kazan during the season:
4	(Brazil)	DF	Leandro Samarone	1	0	0	0	1	0
Total				57	3	1	0	58	3
