= 2003 Russian Premier League =

12th season of top-tier football league in Russia

Russian Premier League
- Season: 2003
- Champions: CSKA Moscow
- Relegated: Uralan Elista; Chernomorets Novorossiysk
- Champions League: CSKA Moscow
- UEFA Cup: Zenit St.Petersburg; Rubin Kazan
- Intertoto Cup: Shinnik Yaroslavl; Spartak Moscow
- Matches: 240
- Goals: 609 (2.54 per match)
- Top goalscorer: Dmitri Loskov (14)

CSKA won their first Russian title. It was their first championship since the last edition of the Soviet Top League in 1991. Newly promoted Rubin got the bronze.

== Teams ==
As in the previous season, 16 teams are playing in the 2003 season. After the 2002 season, Anzhi Makhachkala and Sokol Saratov were relegated to the 2003 Russian First Division. They were replaced by Rubin Kazan and Chernomorets Novorossiysk, the winners and runners up of the 2002 Russian First Division.

=== Venues ===
| Spartak-Alania | Chernomorets | CSKA | Dynamo |
|---|---|---|---|
| Republican Spartak Stadium | Central Stadium | Central Stadium | Central Stadium |
| Capacity: 32,464 | Capacity: 12,500 | Capacity: 36,540 | Capacity: 36,540 |
| Krylia Sovetov Samara | Locations of teams in 2003 Russian Premier League | | Lokomotiv Moscow |
| Metallurg Stadium | Locations of teams in 2003 Russian Premier League | | RZD Arena |
| Capacity: 33,001 | Locations of teams in 2003 Russian Premier League | | Capacity: 27,084 |
| Rostov | Locations of teams in 2003 Russian Premier League | | Rotor |
| Olimp-2 | Locations of teams in 2003 Russian Premier League | | Central Stadium |
| Capacity: 15,840 | Locations of teams in 2003 Russian Premier League | | Capacity: 32,120 |
| Rubin | Locations of teams in 2003 Russian Premier League | | Saturn |
| Central Stadium | Locations of teams in 2003 Russian Premier League | | Saturn Stadium |
| Capacity: 22,500 | Locations of teams in 2003 Russian Premier League | | Capacity: 14,685 |
| Shinnik | Locations of teams in 2003 Russian Premier League | | Spartak |
| Shinnik Stadium | Locations of teams in 2003 Russian Premier League | | Luzhniki Stadium |
| Capacity: 22,871 | Locations of teams in 2003 Russian Premier League | | Capacity: 81,029 |
| Torpedo | Torpedo-ZIL | Uralan | Zenit Saint Petersburg |
| Luzhniki Stadium | Eduard Streltsov Stadium | Uralan Stadium | Petrovsky Stadium |
| Capacity: 81,029 | Capacity: 13,450 | Capacity: | Capacity: 21,570 |

=== Personnel and kits ===
| Team | Location | Head coach | Kit manufacturer | Shirt sponsor |
|---|---|---|---|---|
| Spartak-Alania | Vladikavkaz | (Russia) Bakhva Tedeyev | (United Kingdom) Umbro | - |
| Chernomorets | Novorossiysk | (Ukraine) Igor Gamula (Caretaker) | (Germany) Adidas | - |
| CSKA | Moscow | (Russia) Valery Gazzaev | (United Kingdom) Umbro | - |
| Dynamo | Moscow | (Ukraine) Viktor Prokopenko | (Italy) Diadora | Yukos |
| Lokomotiv | Moscow | (Russia) Yuri Semin | (United States) Nike | MZD |
| Krylia | Samara | (Russia) Aleksandr Tarkhanov | (United Kingdom) Umbro | - |
| Rostov | Rostov-on-Don | (Russia) Sergei Balakhnin | (United States) Nike | - |
| Rotor | Volgograd | (Russia) Vladimir Fayzulin | (United Kingdom) Umbro | - |
| Rubin | Kazan | (Turkmenistan) Kurban Berdyev | (United States) Nike | - |
| Saturn | Ramenskoye | (Russia) Oleg Romantsev | (United States) Nike | - |
| Shinnik | Yaroslavl | (Russia) Aleksandr Pobegalov | (United States) Nike | TM Holding |
| Spartak | Moscow | (Russia) Vladimir Fedotov (Caretaker) | (United Kingdom) Umbro | Lukoil |
| Torpedo | Moscow | (Russia) Sergei Petrenko | (Italy) Diadora | - |
| Torpedo-Metallurg | Moscow | (Russia) Aleksandr Ignatenko (Caretaker) | (Russia) 2K | ZiL |
| Uralan | Elista | (Russia) Igor Shalimov | (Germany) Adidas | - |
| Zenit | Saint Petersburg | (Czech Republic) Vlastimil Petržela | (United Kingdom) Umbro | Gazprom |

=== Managerial changes ===
| Team | Outgoing manager | Manner of departure | Date of vacancy | Position in table | Replaced by | Date of appointment | Position in table |
|---|---|---|---|---|---|---|---|
| Torpedo-ZIL | (Russia) Vadim Nikonov | | | Preseason | (Belarus) Sergei Aleinikov | | Preseason |
| Rotor | (Russia) Vladimir Salkov | | | Preseason | (Russia) Vladimir Fayzulin | | Preseason |
| Uralan Elista | (Georgia (country)) Revaz Dzodzuashvili | | | Preseason | (Russia) Igor Shalimov | | Preseason |
| Spartak-Alania | (Russia) Bakhva Tedeyev | | | Preseason | (Georgia (country)) Revaz Dzodzuashvili | 22 December 2002 | Preseason |
| Zenit | (Russia) Boris Rappoport | | | Preseason | (Czech Republic) Vlastimil Petržela | 23 December 2002 | Preseason |
| Chernomorets | (Russia) Valeri Chetverik | | March 2003 | | (Ukraine) Igor Gamula | March 2003 | |
| Spartak-Alania | (Georgia (country)) Revaz Dzodzuashvili | Resigned | 22 June 2003 | | (Russia) Aleksandr Yanovsky (Caretaker) | June 2003 | |
| Torpedo-ZIL | (Belarus) Sergei Aleinikov | | May 2003 | | (Russia) Valentin Ivanov | May 2003 | |
| Spartak | (Russia) Oleg Romantsev | | June 2003 | | (Russia) Andrey Chernyshov | June 2003 | |
| Spartak-Alania | (Russia) Aleksandr Yanovsky (Caretaker) | | June 2003 | | (Russia) Nikolai Khudiyev | July 2003 | |
| Chernomorets | (Ukraine) Igor Gamula | | July 2003 | | (Russia) Sergei Pavlov | July 2003 | |
| Spartak-Alania | (Russia) Nikolai Khudiyev | | July 2003 | | (Russia) Bakhva Tedeyev | July 2003 | |
| Rostov | (Russia) Sergei Balakhnin | | August 2003 | | (Russia) Vladimir Fedotov (Caretaker) | August 2003 | |
| Rostov | (Russia) Vladimir Fedotov (Caretaker) | | August 2003 | | (Russia) Sergei Balakhnin | August 2003 | |
| Torpedo-ZIL | (Russia) Valentin Ivanov | | August 2003 | | (Russia) Aleksandr Ignatenko (Caretaker) | August 2003 | |
| Saturn | (Russia) Vladimir Shevchuk | | September 2003 | | (Russia) Oleg Romantsev | September 2003 | |
| Spartak | (Russia) Andrey Chernyshov | | September 2003 | | (Russia) Vladimir Fedotov (Caretaker) | September 2003 | |
| Chernomorets | (Russia) Sergei Pavlov | | October 2003 | | (Ukraine) Igor Gamula (Caretaker) | October 2003 | |

== Standings ==
| Pos | Team | Pld | W | D | L | GF | GA | GD | Pts | Qualification or relegation |
|---|---|---|---|---|---|---|---|---|---|---|
| 1 | CSKA Moscow (C) | 30 | 17 | 8 | 5 | 56 | 32 | +24 | 59 | Qualification to Champions League second qualifying round |
| 2 | Zenit St. Petersburg | 30 | 16 | 8 | 6 | 48 | 32 | +16 | 56 | Qualification to UEFA Cup second qualifying round |
| 3 | Rubin Kazan | 30 | 15 | 8 | 7 | 44 | 29 | +15 | 53 | Qualification to UEFA Cup second qualifying round |
| 4 | Lokomotiv Moscow | 30 | 15 | 7 | 8 | 54 | 33 | +21 | 52 | |
| 5 | Shinnik Yaroslavl | 30 | 12 | 11 | 7 | 43 | 34 | +9 | 47 | Qualification to Intertoto Cup second round |
| 6 | Dynamo Moscow | 30 | 12 | 10 | 8 | 42 | 29 | +13 | 46 | |
| 7 | Saturn | 30 | 12 | 9 | 9 | 40 | 37 | +3 | 45 | |
| 8 | Torpedo Moscow | 30 | 11 | 10 | 9 | 42 | 38 | +4 | 43 | |
| 9 | Krylia Sovetov Samara | 30 | 11 | 9 | 10 | 38 | 33 | +5 | 42 | |
| 10 | Spartak Moscow | 30 | 10 | 6 | 14 | 38 | 48 | −10 | 36 | Qualification to Intertoto Cup first round |
| 11 | Rostov | 30 | 8 | 10 | 12 | 30 | 42 | −12 | 34 | |
| 12 | Rotor Volgograd | 30 | 9 | 5 | 16 | 33 | 44 | −11 | 32 | |
| 13 | Spartak-Alania Vladikavkaz | 30 | 9 | 4 | 17 | 23 | 43 | −20 | 31 | |
| 14 | Torpedo-Metallurg Moscow | 30 | 8 | 5 | 17 | 25 | 39 | −14 | 29 | |
| 15 | Uralan Elista (R) | 30 | 6 | 10 | 14 | 23 | 47 | −24 | 28 | Relegation to First Division |
| 16 | Chernomorets Novorossiysk (R) | 30 | 6 | 6 | 18 | 30 | 49 | −19 | 24 | Relegation to First Division |

Source: RFPL
Rules for classification: 1st points; 2nd matches won; 3rd head-to-head (points, matches won, goal difference, goals scored, away goals scored); 4th goal difference
(C) Champions; (R) Relegated

== Results ==
| Home \ Away | SAL | CHE | CSK | DYN | KRY | LOK | ROS | ROT | RUB | SAT | SHI | SPA | TOR | TMM | URE | ZEN |
|---|---|---|---|---|---|---|---|---|---|---|---|---|---|---|---|---|
| Spartak-Alania Vladikavkaz | | 1–0 | 0–1 | 0–1 | 1–1 | 3–2 | 1–0 | 1–0 | 1–0 | 1–0 | 0–1 | 3–0 | 0–0 | 2–0 | 0–1 | 0–2 |
| Chernomorets Novorossiysk | 3–0 | | 0–1 | 0–1 | 1–3 | 2–5 | 2–2 | 1–0 | 1–0 | 0–1 | 2–1 | 2–3 | 2–4 | 1–2 | 1–1 | 1–0 |
| CSKA Moscow | 3–0 | 3–2 | | 1–1 | 3–0 | 2–0 | 0–1 | 3–0 | 4–0 | 1–1 | 2–2 | 3–2 | 2–0 | 1–0 | 2–0 | 2–2 |
| Dynamo Moscow | 0–0 | 3–2 | 2–3 | | 2–1 | 1–1 | 1–1 | 3–1 | 0–0 | 1–1 | 1–2 | 3–2 | 1–2 | 0–1 | 2–0 | 7–1 |
| Krylia Sovetov Samara | 3–0 | 1–1 | 0–2 | 1–0 | | 3–0 | 3–0 | 3–0 | 0–0 | 3–1 | 1–0 | 0–2 | 4–2 | 2–0 | 0–0 | 2–1 |
| Lokomotiv Moscow | 2–0 | 1–0 | 1–3 | 2–0 | 2–1 | | 0–0 | 3–0 | 1–1 | 2–1 | 6–1 | 2–1 | 1–2 | 1–0 | 6–0 | 1–2 |
| Rostov | 3–1 | 0–2 | 0–1 | 1–1 | 2–1 | 1–1 | | 4–3 | 0–1 | 1–2 | 1–1 | 3–2 | 0–0 | 1–0 | 1–0 | 1–1 |
| Rotor Volgograd | 2–1 | 3–0 | 1–2 | 0–1 | 1–0 | 0–2 | 2–0 | | 3–1 | 0–1 | 0–0 | 1–1 | 2–0 | 2–2 | 2–0 | 1–4 |
| Rubin Kazan | 4–0 | 3–1 | 3–2 | 2–1 | 3–1 | 3–1 | 5–0 | 1–0 | | 0–0 | 1–0 | 1–0 | 3–1 | 1–0 | 0–0 | 1–2 |
| Saturn | 2–2 | 2–0 | 2–2 | 0–1 | 1–1 | 0–0 | 2–1 | 4–1 | 1–1 | | 2–1 | 3–2 | 2–0 | 0–3 | 2–1 | 1–3 |
| Shinnik Yaroslavl | 2–0 | 1–1 | 1–1 | 0–0 | 2–0 | 1–1 | 4–1 | 2–2 | 2–2 | 1–0 | | 1–2 | 1–1 | 3–0 | 2–1 | 3–0 |
| Spartak Moscow | 1–2 | 2–1 | 0–0 | 2–1 | 1–1 | 2–5 | 1–0 | 3–2 | 0–2 | 0–1 | 3–1 | | 1–0 | 0–2 | 1–1 | 1–1 |
| Torpedo Moscow | 2–0 | 1–1 | 3–2 | 1–1 | 0–0 | 1–0 | 1–1 | 0–3 | 4–2 | 4–3 | 1–1 | 3–0 | | 3–0 | 3–0 | 1–2 |
| Torpedo-Metallurg Moscow | 3–1 | 0–0 | 2–1 | 0–1 | 3–0 | 1–3 | 0–3 | 1–0 | 1–2 | 2–3 | 1–2 | 0–0 | 0–0 | | 1–1 | 0–1 |
| Uralan Elista | 2–1 | 1–0 | 2–2 | 1–5 | 0–0 | 1–2 | 3–1 | 0–1 | 1–1 | 0–0 | 0–2 | 1–2 | 2–2 | 1–0 | | 1–0 |
| Zenit St. Petersburg | 2–1 | 3–0 | 4–1 | 0–0 | 2–2 | 0–0 | 0–0 | 0–0 | 1–0 | 2–1 | 1–2 | 2–1 | 1–0 | 3–0 | 5–1 | |

Legend: Blue = home team win; Yellow = draw; Red = away team win.

== Season statistics ==
=== Top goalscorers ===
As of matches played on 1 November 2003.

| Rank | Player | Club | Goal |
|---|---|---|---|
| 1 | (Russia) Dmitri Loskov | Lokomotiv | 14 |
| 2 | (Russia) Aleksandr Kerzhakov | Zenit | 13 |
| 2 | (Russia) Valery Yesipov | Rotor | 13 |
| 4 | (Russia) Aleksei Medvedev | Saturn | 11 |
| 4 | (Brazil) Rôni | Rubin | 11 |
| 6 | (Russia) Roman Pavlyuchenko | Spartak Moscow | 10 |
| 7 | (Russia) Yegor Titov | Spartak Moscow | 10 |
| 7 | (Russia) Dmitri Bulykin | Dynamo | 10 |
| 7 | (Russia) Andrei Karyaka | Krylia | 10 |
| 7 | (Bulgaria) Martin Kushev | Shinnik | 10 |
| 7 | (Russia) Rolan Gusev | CSKA | 10 |
| 7 | (Russia) Andrey Tikhonov | Krylia | 10 |

== Awards ==
On November 14 Russian Football Union named its list of 33 top players:

Goalkeepers

1. (Russia) Sergei Ovchinnikov (Lokomotiv Moscow)
2. (Russia) Vyacheslav Malafeev (Zenit)
3. (Russia) Sergei Kozko (Rubin)

Right backs

1. (Russia) Vadim Evseev (Lokomotiv Moscow)
2. (Lithuania) Deividas Šemberas (CSKA Moscow)
3. (Uruguay) Andrés Scotti (Rubin)

Right-centre backs

1. (Russia) Sergei Ignashevich (Lokomotiv Moscow)
2. (Russia) Viktor Onopko (Spartak-Alania)
3. (South Africa) Matthew Booth (Rostov)

Left-centre backs

1. (Uzbekistan) Oleg Pashinin (Lokomotiv Moscow)
2. (Brazil) Géder (Saturn)
3. (Russia) Roman Sharonov (Rubin)

Left backs

1. (South Africa) Jacob Lekgetho (Lokomotiv Moscow)
2. (Russia) Andrei Solomatin (CSKA Moscow)
3. (Brazil) Orlando Calisto de Souza (Rubin)

Defensive midfielders

1. (Russia) Evgeni Aldonin (Rotor)
2. (Uzbekistan) Vladimir Maminov (Lokomotiv Moscow)
3. (Bosnia and Herzegovina) Elvir Rahimić (CSKA Moscow)

Right wingers

1. (Russia) Rolan Gusev (CSKA Moscow)
2. (Russia) Denis Boyarintsev (Rubin)
3. (Russia) Vladimir Bystrov (Zenit)

Central midfielders

1. (Russia) Dmitri Loskov (Lokomotiv Moscow)
2. (Czech Republic) Jiří Jarošík (CSKA Moscow)
3. (Russia) Yegor Titov (Spartak Moscow)

Left wingers

1. (Russia) Andrei Karyaka (Krylia Sovetov)
2. (Russia) Marat Izmailov (Lokomotiv Moscow)
3. (Russia) Aleksandr Pavlenko (Spartak Moscow)

Right forwards

1. (Russia) Valery Yesipov (Rotor)
2. (Russia) Dmitri Bulykin (Dynamo Moscow)
3. (Georgia (country)) Mikheil Ashvetia (Lokomotiv Moscow)

Left forwards

1. (Russia) Aleksandr Kerzhakov (Zenit)
2. (Croatia) Ivica Olić (CSKA Moscow)
3. (Brazil) Roni (Rubin)

== Medal squads ==
1. PFC CSKA Moscow

Goalkeepers: Veniamin Mandrykin (19), Igor Akinfeev (13).
Defenders: Aleksei Berezutski (30), Bohdan Shershun (Ukraine) (27 / 1), Denis Yevsikov (24), Vasili Berezutski (23), Deividas Šemberas (Lithuania) (21), Andrei Solomatin (20).
Midfielders: Elvir Rahimić (Bosnia and Herzegovina) (28 / 1), Jiří Jarošík (Czech Republic) (27 / 7), Rolan Gusev (26 / 9), Igor Yanovsky (25 / 5), Sergei Semak (24 / 7), Juris Laizāns (Latvia) (21 / 1), Spartak Gogniyev (11 / 2), Alan Kusov (11), Artur Tlisov (3 / 1).
Forwards: Denis Popov (22 / 8), Dmitri Kirichenko (22 / 5), Ivica Olić (Croatia) (10 / 7), Alexander Geynrikh (Uzbekistan) (2 / 1), Sergey Samodin (2), Vardan Mazalov (1).
(league appearances and goals listed in brackets)

One own goal scored by Andrés Scotti (Uruguay) (FC Rubin Kazan).

Manager: Valery Gazzaev.

Transferred out during the season: Alan Kusov (on loan to FC Spartak-Alania Vladikavkaz).

2. FC Zenit St. Petersburg

Goalkeepers: Vyacheslav Malafeev (27), Kamil Čontofalský (Slovakia) (3).
Defenders: Milan Vještica (Serbia) (28), Pavel Mareš (Czech Republic) (26 / 2), Martin Horák (Czech Republic) (21 / 2), Daniel Chiriţă (Romania) (21 / 1), Aleksei Katulsky (17 / 1), Aleksei Igonin (11), Sargis Hovsepyan (Armenia) (10), Konstantin Lobov (9), Valeri Tsvetkov (8), Igor Nedorezov (1).
Midfielders: Andrei Arshavin (27 / 5), Aleksandr Spivak (Ukraine) (26 / 6), Vladislav Radimov (21 / 3), Vladimir Bystrov (19 / 4), Igor Denisov (19 / 2), Radek Šírl (Czech Republic) (18 / 1), Konstantin Konoplyov (15 / 1), Oleg Vlasov (13 / 2), Sergei Osipov (8).
Forwards: Aleksandr Kerzhakov (27 / 13), Dmitri Makarov (12 / 2), Lukáš Hartig (Czech Republic) (12 / 1), Andrei Nikolayev (6 / 2), Maksim Astafyev (4), Predrag Ranđelović (Serbia) (3).

Manager: Vlastimil Petržela (Czech Republic) .

Transferred out during the season: Sargis Hovsepyan (Armenia) (to FC Torpedo-Metallurg Moscow), Sergei Osipov (to FC Torpedo Moscow), Predrag Ranđelović (Serbia) (free agent).

3. FC Rubin Kazan

Goalkeepers: Sergei Kozko (24), Pavel Kharchik (Turkmenistan) (4), Valeri Aleskarov (2).
Defenders: Jiří Novotný (Czech Republic) (29 / 6), Mikhail Sinyov (27), Calisto (Brazil) (23 / 1), Roman Sharonov (18 / 1), Andrei Fyodorov (Uzbekistan) (17 / 1), Leandro Samaroni (Brazil) (9), Sergei Kharlamov (7), Andrei Streltsov (1), Pape Magatte Kebe (Senegal) (1).
Midfielders: Denis Boyarintsev (28 / 7), Andrés Scotti (Uruguay) (27 / 4), Tomáš Čížek (Czech Republic) (25 / 1), MacBeth Sibaya (South Africa) (24 / 1), Andrei Konovalov (23 / 2), Ebrima Sillah (The Gambia) (12 / 2), Abdelkarim Kissi (Morocco) (5), Dmitri Michkov (5), Carlos Castro (Costa Rica) (4), Baye Gueye Ndiaga (Senegal) (2 / 1).
Forwards: Roni (Brazil) (29 / 11), Oleg Nechayev (25 / 2), David Chaladze (Georgia (country)) (20 / 3), Aloísio (Brazil) (6), Wladimir Baýramow (Turkmenistan) (1).

Manager: Kurban Berdyev.

One own goal scored by Denis Yevsikov (PFC CSKA Moscow).

Transferred out during the season: Leandro Samaroni (Brazil) , Wladimir Baýramow (Turkmenistan) (both to FC Terek Grozny).

== See also ==
2003 in Russian football
