= Dmitri Chigazov =

Russian footballer

Personal information
- Full name: Dmitri Ivanovich Chigazov
- Date of birth: 29 June 1983 (age 43)
- Place of birth: Leningrad, Russian SFSR
- Height: 1.81 m (5 ft 11 1/2 in)
- Position: Goalkeeper

Youth career
- DYuSSh Smena-Zenit

Senior career*
Years	Team	Apps	(Gls)
2001	FC Oazis Yartsevo	12	(0)
2001	FC Kristall Smolensk	1	(0)
2003–2006	FC Rubin Kazan	0	(0)
2003	→ FK Jūrmala-VV (loan)	23	(0)
2004	→ FC Rubin-2 Kazan (loan)	34	(0)
2006	RSK Dižvanagi	5	(0)
2007	FK Jūrmala-VV	4	(0)
- * Club domestic league appearances and goals

Dmitri Ivanovich Chigazov (Russian: Дмитрий Иванович Чигазов; born 29 June 1983) is a former Russian football player.

== Club career ==
He played in the Russian Football National League for FC Kristall Smolensk in 2001.

== International career ==
He represented Russia at the 2000 UEFA European Under-16 Championship.
