= Zviad Jeladze =

Georgian footballer

Personal information
- Full name: Zviad Jeladze
- Date of birth: 16 December 1973 (age 52)
- Place of birth: Sukhumi, Soviet Union
- Height: 1.88 m (6 ft 2 in)
- Position: Defender

Youth career
- Gorda Rustavi

Senior career*
Years	Team	Apps	(Gls)
1990–1994	Gorda Rustavi	8	(0)
1990–1993	Tskhumi Sokhumi	50	(0)
1993–1994	Antsi Tbilisi	15	(1)
1994–1996	Samtredia	55	(0)
1996–1998	Dinamo Tbilisi	63	(2)
1999	Sokol Saratov	26	(0)
2000	Lokomotiv St. Petersburg	16	(2)
2000–2001	Kristall Smolensk	27	(0)
2001	Baltika Kaliningrad	15	(1)
2002	Kristall Smolensk	23	(0)
2003	Baltika Kaliningrad	36	(0)
2004	Sodovik Sterlitamak	23	(1)
2004–2005	Ameri Tbilisi	14	(0)
2005–2006	Dinamo Sokhumi	13	(0)
2006–2009	FC Vostok	86	(0)

International career
1996–1998	Georgia	3	(0)
- * Club domestic league appearances and goals

Zviad Jeladze (born 16 December 1973) is a retired Georgian footballer.

He is the brother of Gizo Jeladze, his teammate.

== Career ==
Jeladze started his career at Tskhumi Sokhumi before left for Samtredia. He then signed by Dinamo Tbilisi, the country tradition giant. He then left for Russian First Division side Sokol Saratov.

During career at Russia, he also played for First League side except Sodovik Sterlitamak in Russian Second Division.

Jeladze played for Georgia from 1996 to 1998.
