= Gizo Jeladze =

Georgian footballer

Personal information
- Date of birth: 17 May 1975 (age 51)
- Place of birth: Sukhumi, Georgian SSR
- Height: 1.78 m (5 ft 10 in)
- Position: Midfielder

Senior career*
Years	Team	Apps	(Gls)
1990	Gorda Sokhumi	8	(0)
1991	Subtropiki Sokhumi	14	(2)
1991–1993	FC Tskhumi Sokhumi	16	(0)
1994	Antsi Tbilisi	7	(1)
1994–1995	FC Shevardeni-1906 Tbilisi	31	(1)
1996	FC Dinamo Tbilisi	4	(0)
1997–1998	FC Sokol Saratov	56	(4)
1999	FC Zhemchuzhina Sochi	12	(0)
1999	FC Sokol Saratov	17	(2)
2000	FC Lokomotiv St. Petersburg	17	(0)
2000–2001	FC Baltika Kaliningrad	42	(1)
2002–2003	FC Rubin Kazan	22	(0)
2003–2004	FC Sokol Saratov	42	(5)
2005	FC Ameri Tbilisi	14	(2)
2005–2006	FC Dinamo Batumi	13	(1)
2006–2007	FC Ameri Tbilisi	30	(2)
2008	FC Vostok	20	(0)
- * Club domestic league appearances and goals

Gizo Jeladze (Georgian: გიზო ჯელაძე; Russian: Гизо Анзорович Джеладзе; born 17 May 1975) is a Georgian retired professional football player. He also holds Russian citizenship.

Jeladze played one league match for FC Dinamo Tbilisi's 1995–96 league-winning side, and three league matches for its 1996–97 league-winning side.

His older brother Zviad Jeladze is also a footballer.
