= Rôni =

Brazilian footballer

Personal information
- Full name: Roniéliton Pereira Santos
- Date of birth: 28 April 1977 (age 49)
- Place of birth: Aurora, Tocantins, Brazil
- Height: 1.73 m (5 ft 8 in)
- Position: Striker

Youth career
- 1995–1996: Vila Nova

Senior career*
| Years | Team | Apps | (Gls) |
| 1996 | São Paulo | ? | (?) |
| 1997–2000 | Fluminense | 83 | (24) |
| 2001 | Al-Hilal | ? | (?) |
| 2001–2002 | Fluminense | ? | (?) |
| 2003–2005 | Rubin Kazan | 55 | (19) |
| 2004–2005 | → Krylia Sovetov (Loan) | 8 | (1) |
| 2005–2006 | Goiás | 27 | (8) |
| 2006–2007 | Atlético Mineiro | 23 | (14) |
| 2007 | Flamengo | 7 | (2) |
| 2007–2008 | Cruzeiro | 30 | (12) |
| 2008 | → Yokohama F. Marinos (Loan) | 16 | (5) |
| 2008 | → Gamba Osaka (Loan) | 9 | (2) |
| 2009 | Santos FC | 3 | (1) |
| 2009–2010 | Fluminense | 12 | (2) |
| 2010–2011 | Vila Nova | 29 | (15) |
| 2012 | Anapolina | ? | (?) |
| Total | | 302 | (105) |

International career
| 1999 | Brazil U-23 | 1 | (2) |
| 1999 | Brazil | 5 | (2) |
- * Club domestic league appearances and goals

Roniéliton Pereira Santos or simply Rôni (born 28 April 1977) is a Brazilian former footballer who played as a striker.

== Career statistics ==
=== Club ===
Appearances and goals by club, season and competition
| Club | Season | League | | | National Cup | | League Cup | | Continental | | Other | | Total | |
| Club | Season | Division | Apps | Goals | Apps | Goals | Apps | Goals | Apps | Goals | Apps | Goals | Apps | Goals |
|---|---|---|---|---|---|---|---|---|---|---|---|---|---|---|
| Rubin Kazan | 2003 | Russian Premier League | 29 | 11 | 0 | 0 | - | | - | | - | | 29 | 11 |
| Rubin Kazan | 2004 | Russian Premier League | 17 | 5 | 2 | 0 | - | | 1 | 1 | - | | 20 | 6 |
| Rubin Kazan | 2005 | Russian Premier League | 9 | 3 | 0 | 0 | - | | - | | - | | 9 | 3 |
| Rubin Kazan | Total | | 55 | 19 | 2 | 0 | - | - | 1 | 1 | - | - | 58 | 20 |
| Krylia Sovetov (loan) | 2004 | Russian Premier League | 8 | 1 | 0 | 0 | – | | – | | – | | 8 | 1 |
| Yokohama F. Marinos (loan) | 2008 | J1 League | 16 | 5 | 0 | 0 | 7 | 3 | – | | – | | 23 | 8 |
| Gamba Osaka (loan) | 2008 | J1 League | 9 | 2 | 1 | 0 | 2 | 1 | 4 | 1 | – | | 16 | 4 |
| Career total | | | 88 | 27 | 3 | 0 | 9 | 4 | 5 | 2 | - | - | 105 | 33 |

=== International ===
Brazil national team
| Year | Apps | Goals |
|---|---|---|
| 1999 | 5 | 2 |
| Total | 5 | 2 |

=== International goals ===
Scores and results list Brazil's goal tally first.

| No | Date | Venue | Opponent | Score | Result | Competition |
|---|---|---|---|---|---|---|
| 1. | 1 August 1999 | Estadio Jalisco, Guadalajara, Mexico | Saudi Arabia | 5–2 | 8–2 | 1999 FIFA Confederations Cup |
| 2. | 4 August 1999 | Estadio Azteca, Mexico City, Mexico | Mexico | 2–2 | 3–4 | 1999 FIFA Confederations Cup |

== Honours ==
=== Club ===
Vila Nova

- Goiás State League: 1995
- Brazilian League (3rd division): 1996

Fluminense

- Brazilian League (3rd division): 1999
- Rio de Janeiro State League: 2002

Atlético Mineiro

- Brazilian League (2nd division): 2006

Flamengo

- Rio de Janeiro State League: 2007
- Taça Guanabara: 2007

Goiás

- Goiás State League: 2006

Gamba Osaka

- AFC Champions League: 2008
- Emperor's Cup: 2008
