= Sergei Kozko =

Russian footballer

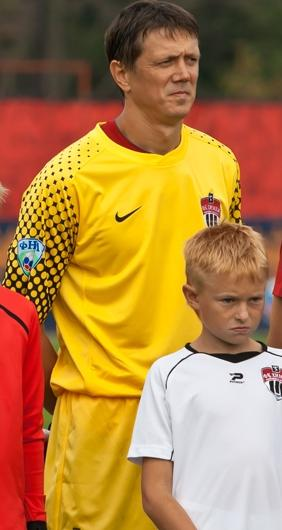
- Kozko with Khimki in 2011

Personal information
- Full name: Sergei Viktorovich Kozko
- Date of birth: 12 April 1975 (age 51)
- Place of birth: Stavropol, Soviet Union
- Height: 1.88 m (6 ft 2 in)
- Position: Goalkeeper

Team information
- Current team: FC Rubin Kazan (GK coach)

Youth career
- DYuSSh #4 Stavropol

Senior career*
Years	Team	Apps	(Gls)
1993	FC Asmaral Kislovodsk	13	(0)
1994–1998	FC Dynamo Stavropol	129	(0)
1999–2001	FC Torpedo-ZIL Moscow	36	(0)
2002–2004	FC Rubin Kazan	62	(0)
2005–2007	FC Moscow	13	(0)
2008–2010	FC Rubin Kazan	6	(0)
2011	FC Khimki	12	(0)

Managerial career
- 2012–2014: FC Torpedo Armavir (GK coach)
- 2014–2015: FC Rubin Kazan (GK coach)
- 2015–2016: FC Kuban Krasnodar (GK coach)
- 2016: FC Aktobe (GK coach)
- 2017: FC Neftekhimik Nizhnekamsk (GK coach)
- 2019–: FC Rubin Kazan (GK coach)
- * Club domestic league appearances and goals

Sergei Viktorovich Kozko (Russian: Серге́й Викторович Козко; born 12 April 1975) is a Russian football coach and a former player who works as a goalkeeping coach with FC Rubin Kazan.

== Career statistics ==
As of 30 December 2009

Club	Div	Season	League		Cup		Europe		Total	
Club	Div	Season	Apps	Goals	Apps	Goals	Apps	Goals	Apps	Goals
(Russia) Asmaral Kislovodsk	D2, "West"	1993	13	0	-	-	-		13	0
(Russia) Asmaral Kislovodsk	Total		13	0	0	0	0	0	13	0
(Russia) Dynamo Stavropol	RFPL	1994	5	0	2	0	-		7	0
(Russia) Dynamo Stavropol	D2	1995	36	0	1	0	-		37	0
(Russia) Dynamo Stavropol	D2	1996	27	0	-	-	-		27	0
(Russia) Dynamo Stavropol	D2	1997	40	0	2	0	-		42	0
(Russia) Dynamo Stavropol	D2	1998	21	0	1	0	-		22	0
(Russia) Dynamo Stavropol	Total		129	0	6	0	0	0	135	0
(Russia) Torpedo-ZIL	D2	1999	19	0	1	0	-		20	0
(Russia) Torpedo-ZIL	D2	2000	10	0	1	0	-		11	0
(Russia) Torpedo-ZIL	RFPL	2001	7	0	-	-	-		7	0
(Russia) Torpedo-ZIL	Total		36	0	2	0	0	0	38	0
(Russia) Rubin Kazan	D2	2002	18	0	-	-	-		18	0
(Russia) Rubin Kazan	RFPL	2003	24	0	-	-	-		24	0
(Russia) Rubin Kazan	RFPL	2004	20	0	-	-	2	0	22	0
(Russia) Rubin Kazan	Total		62	0	0	0	2	0	64	0
(Russia) FK Moskva	RFPL	2005	0	0	6	0	-		6	0
(Russia) FK Moskva	RFPL	2006	12	0	2	0	-		14	0
(Russia) FK Moskva	RFPL	2007	1	0	1	0	-		2	0
(Russia) FK Moskva	Total		13	0	9	0	0	0	22	0
(Russia) Rubin Kazan	RFPL	2008	6	0	1	0	-		7	0
(Russia) Rubin Kazan	RFPL	2009	0	0	1	0	-		1	0
(Russia) Rubin Kazan	Total		6	0	2	0	0	0	8	0
Career total			261	0	19	0	2	0	282	0
