= Baye Gueye Ndiaga =

Senegalese footballer

Personal information
- Date of birth: October 20, 1975 (age 51)
- Place of birth: Dakar, Senegal
- Height: 1.76 m (5 ft 9 1/2 in)
- Position: Midfielder

Senior career*
Years	Team	Apps	(Gls)
1999–2009	ASC Diaraf	199	(7)
2003	→ FC Rubin Kazan (loan)	2	(1)
- * Club domestic league appearances and goals

Baye Gueye Ndiaga (born 20 October 1975) is a former Senegalese professional football player.

== Career ==
He played 2 games and scored 1 goal for FC Rubin Kazan in the Russian Premier League in the 2003 season, when they took the bronze medals.
