= Denis Fedotov =

Russian footballer and coach

Personal information
- Full name: Denis Yuryevich Fedotov
- Date of birth: 15 November 1977 (age 48)
- Height: 1.84 m (6 ft 0 in)
- Positions: Defender; midfielder

Senior career*
Years	Team	Apps	(Gls)
1996	FC Karelia-Erzi Petrozavodsk	22	(0)
1999	FC Oazis Yartsevo	29	(0)
2002	FC Don Novomoskovsk	20	(2)
2003	FC Dynamo-SPb St. Petersburg	4	(0)
2004	FC Severstal Cherepovets	29	(0)
2005	FC Metallurg Pikalyovo (D4)		
2006–2012	FC Sever Murmansk	119	(8)

Managerial career
- 2012–2013: FC Sever Murmansk (administrator)
- 2013: FC Sever Murmansk (director)
- 2013: FC Sever Murmansk
- 2013–2014: FC Sever Murmansk (director)
- 2014–2016: FC Tosno (administrator)
- * Club domestic league appearances and goals

Denis Yuryevich Fedotov (Russian: Денис Юрьевич Федотов; born 15 November 1977) is a Russian professional football coach and a former player.

== Club career ==
He played in the Russian Football National League for FC Dynamo Saint Petersburg in 2003.
