= Mikhail Sinyov =

Russian footballer

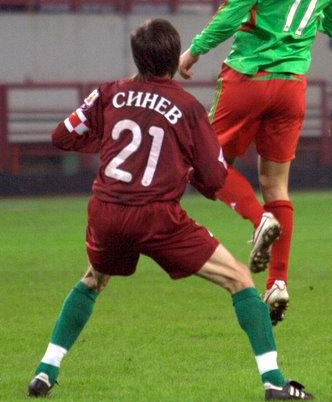

Personal information
- Full name: Mikhail Yuryevich Sinyov
- Date of birth: 21 June 1972 (age 54)
- Place of birth: Moscow, Russian SFSR
- Height: 1.80 m (5 ft 11 in)
- Position: Defender

Youth career
- PFC CSKA Moscow

Senior career*
Years	Team	Apps	(Gls)
1988	PFC CSKA-2 Moscow	0	(0)
1989–1992	PFC CSKA Moscow	2	(0)
1992	→ PFC CSKA-d Moscow	25	(0)
1993	FC KAMAZ Naberezhnye Chelny	30	(0)
1994	PFC CSKA Moscow	8	(0)
1994	→ PFC CSKA-d Moscow	9	(0)
1996–1998	FC Arsenal Tula	101	(2)
1999–2001	FC Torpedo-ZIL Moscow	94	(1)
2002–2007	FC Rubin Kazan	138	(0)
2008	FC Ural Sverdlovsk Oblast	16	(0)

International career
1993	Russia U-21	1	(0)
- * Club domestic league appearances and goals

Mikhail Yuryevich Sinyov (Russian: Михаил Юрьевич Синёв; born 21 June 1972) is a Russian former professional footballer.

== Club career ==
He made his professional debut in the Soviet Top League in 1991 for PFC CSKA Moscow.

== Honours ==
- Soviet Top League winner: 1991.
- Russian Premier League bronze: 2003.
- Soviet Cup finalist: 1992.

== European club competitions ==
- UEFA Cup Winners' Cup 1994–95 with PFC CSKA Moscow: 2 games.
- UEFA Cup 2004–05 qualification with FC Rubin Kazan: 2 games.
- UEFA Cup 2006–07 qualification with FC Rubin Kazan: 1 game.
- UEFA Intertoto Cup 2007 with FC Rubin Kazan: 4 games.
