= Valeri Aleskarov =

Russian footballer and coach

Personal information
- Full name: Valeri Vladimirovich Aleskarov
- Date of birth: 19 August 1971 (age 55)
- Place of birth: Ruzayevka, Russian SFSR
- Height: 1.90 m (6 ft 3 in)
- Position: Goalkeeper

Team information
- Current team: FC Tyumen (GK coach)

Senior career*
Years	Team	Apps	(Gls)
1991–1996	FC Neftekhimik Nizhnekamsk	90	(0)
1996	FC KAMAZ-Chally Naberezhnye Chelny	0	(0)
1997–2004	FC Rubin Kazan	45	(0)
2005–2006	FC Rubin-2 Kazan	38	(0)

Managerial career
- 2013–2014: FC Neftekhimik Nizhnekamsk (assistant)
- 2015–2017: FC Neftekhimik Nizhnekamsk (GK coach)
- 2017–2018: FC Zenit-Izhevsk (assistant)
- 2018–2019: FC Murom (assistant)
- 2019: FC Rotor Volgograd (GK coach)
- 2020: FC Murom (GK coach)
- 2021–: FC Tyumen (GK coach)
- * Club domestic league appearances and goals

Valeri Vladimirovich Aleskarov (Russian: Валерий Владимирович Алескаров; born 19 August 1971) is a Russian professional football coach and a former player. He is a goalkeepers' coach with FC Tyumen.

== Club career ==
Aleskarov made his professional debut in the Soviet Second League B in 1991 for FC Neftekhimik Nizhnekamsk. He also played for FC Rubin Kazan.

After he retired from playing football, Aleskarov became a goalkeeping coach, with spells at Neftekhimik Nizhnekamsk, FC Murom and Rotor Volgograd.

== Honours ==
- Russian Premier League bronze: 2003.
