= Tamerlan Varziyev =

Russian footballer

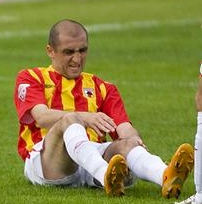
- Tamerlan Varziev in 2008

Personal information
- Full name: Tamerlan Elbrusovich Varziyev
- Date of birth: 22 September 1978 (age 48)
- Place of birth: Ordzhonikidze, Russian SFSR
- Height: 1.83 m (6 ft 0 in)
- Positions: Defender; midfielder

Youth career
- FC Alania Vladikavkaz

Senior career*
| Years | Team | Apps | (Gls) |
| 1998 | FC Alania-2 Vladikavkaz | 38 | (0) |
| 1999 | FC Iriston Vladikavkaz | 29 | (0) |
| 2000–2001 | FC Mozdok | 65 | (6) |
| 2002 | FC Avtodor Vladikavkaz | 30 | (3) |
| 2003–2004 | FC Alania Vladikavkaz | 33 | (1) |
| 2005 | FC Spartak Chelyabinsk | 37 | (0) |
| 2006–2009 | FC Alania Vladikavkaz | 99 | (6) |
| 2010 | FC Volgar-Gazprom Astrakhan | 28 | (1) |
| 2011–2013 | FC Neftekhimik Nizhnekamsk | 46 | (2) |
- * Club domestic league appearances and goals

Tamerlan Elbrusovich Varziyev (Russian: Тамерлан Эльбрусович Варзиев; born 22 September 1978) is a former Russian professional footballer. He made his debut in the Russian Premier League in 2003 for FC Spartak-Alania Vladikavkaz.
