= Berny Wright =

Costa Rican footballer (born 1979)

Personal information
- Full name: Berny Elisio Wright McClean
- Date of birth: June 8, 1979 (age 47)
- Place of birth: San José, Costa Rica
- Height: 1.87 m (6 ft 1 1/2 in)
- Position: Defender

Senior career*
Years	Team	Apps	(Gls)
1998	Saprissa		
2000	Carmelita		
- Comunicaciones
2002	Guanacasteca		
2003	Krylia Sovetov	18	(2)
2004–2009	Brujas		
2005–2007	→ Carmelita (loan)		
- * Club domestic league appearances and goals

Berny Elisio Wright McClean (born June 8, 1979) is a Costa Rican former professional footballer.

== Club career ==
He had a stint in the Russian Premier League with Krylia Sovetov in 2003, but left the club in April 2004 claiming they owed him salary. On 29 August 2004, Wright scored Brujas' first Primera Division goal against Herediano.

== Personal life ==
Wright is a brother of former Costa Rican international Mauricio Wright.

== Honours ==
- Russian Cup finalist: 2004 (played in the early stages of the 2003/04 tournament for FC Krylia Sovetov Samara).
