= Sergei Kharlamov =

Russian footballer

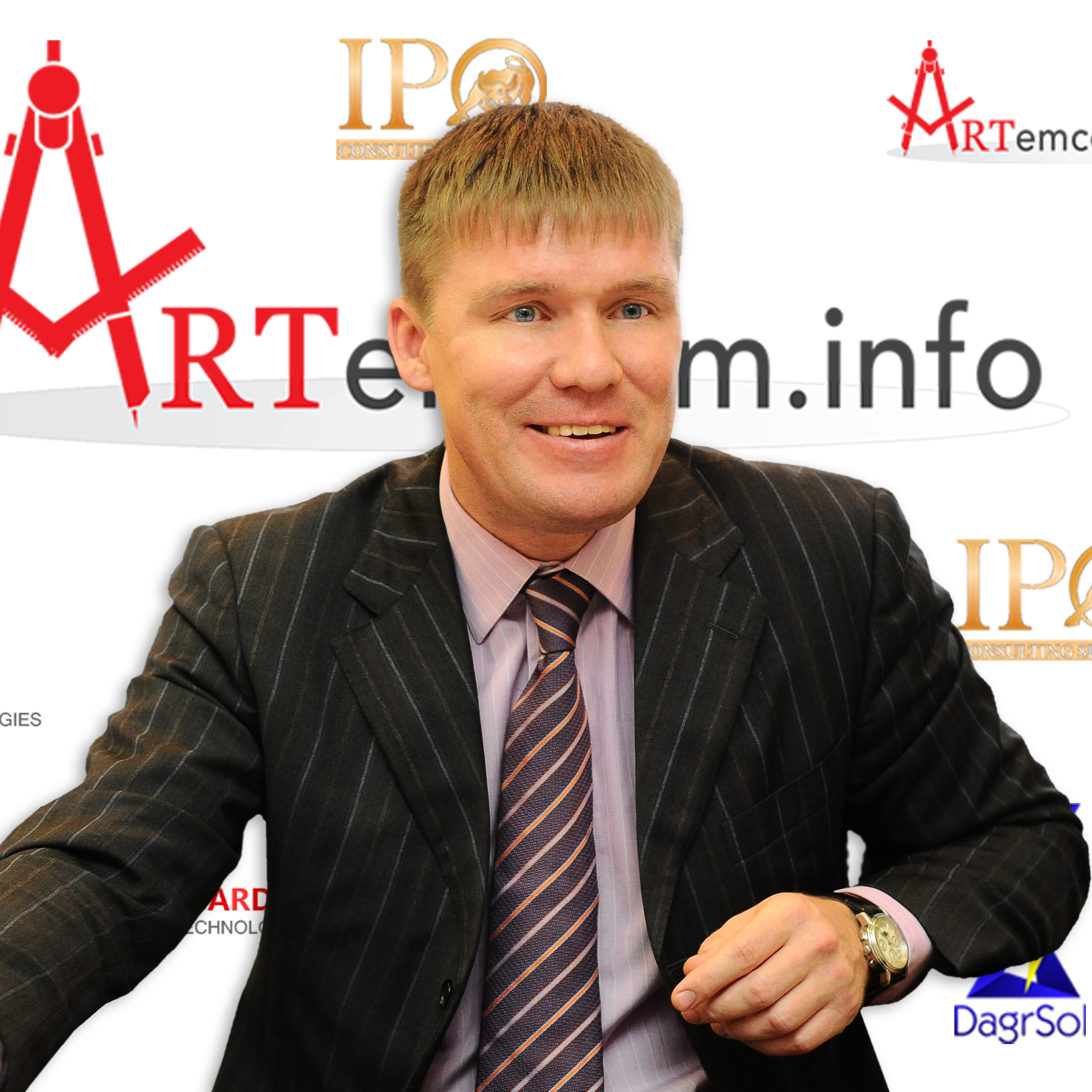

Personal information
- Full name: Sergei Sergeyevich Kharlamov
- Date of birth: 22 June 1973 (age 53)
- Place of birth: Kazan, Russian SFSR
- Height: 1.74 m (5 ft 8 1/2 in)
- Positions: Defender; midfielder

Youth career
- FC Rubin Kazan

Senior career*
Years	Team	Apps	(Gls)
1990–1993	FC Rubin Kazan	134	(4)
1994–1996	FC Neftekhimik Nizhnekamsk	100	(1)
1997–2000	FC Rubin Kazan	124	(3)
2001	FC Diana Volzhsk	13	(0)
2001–2004	FC Rubin Kazan	39	(0)
- * Club domestic league appearances and goals

Sergei Sergeyevich Kharlamov (Russian: Серге́й Серге́евич Харламов; born 22 June 1973) is a Russian former professional football player.

== Career ==
Kharlamov captained FC Rubin Kazan from 1999 to 2004.

== Fraud conviction ==
After he retired from playing football, Kharlamov was involved in marketing investments for a Kazan-based credit production company, Rost, which the Republic of Tatarstan Interior Ministry determined to be an illegal financial pyramid scheme. The Ministry charged Kharlamov with participating in the defrauding of 3,500 investors from December 2013 to March 2015.

On 30 July 2020, prosecutors at trial requested a sentence of 16.5 years of imprisonment.

On 13 November 2020, he was sentenced to 12 years of imprisonment for fraud.

== Honours ==
- Russian Premier League bronze: 2003.
