= Calisto (footballer) =

Brazilian footballer (born 1975)

Personal information
- Full name: Orlando Calisto de Souza
- Date of birth: 18 December 1975 (age 50)
- Place of birth: Duque de Caxias, Brazil
- Height: 1.74 m (5 ft 8 1/2 in)
- Position: Left back

Youth career
- 1995–1997: Barra da Tijuca-RJ

Senior career*
| Years | Team | Apps | (Gls) |
| 1997 | → Comercial-PR (loan) | | |
| 1998–2000 | América-RJ | | |
| 2001 | Anapolina | | |
| 2002 | CRB | | |
| 2002 | Corinthians-AL | | |
| 2002 | Bahia | 19 | (1) |
| 2003–2007 | Rubin Kazan | 109 | (10) |
| 2008 | Vasco | 13 | (2) |
| 2008 | Atlético Mineiro | 9 | (0) |
| 2009 | Botafogo-PB | | |
| 2009 | Olaria | | |
| 2010 | Juventude | | |
| 2011 | Olaria | 9 | (0) |
| 2011 | Audax Rio | 3 | (0) |
| 2012–2013 | Olaria | 13 | (1) |
| 2014 | Santa Rita | 17 | (0) |
- * Club domestic league appearances and goals

Orlando Calisto de Souza or simply Calisto (born 18 December 1975) is a Brazilian former football left back.

== Club career ==
He previously played for Russian Premier League side Rubin Kazan and Brazilian Série A club Vasco and Atlético Mineiro.

== Honours ==
- Alagoas State League: 2002
