= Levan Silagadze =

Georgian footballer

Personal information
- Date of birth: 4 August 1976 (age 50)
- Height: 1.83 m (6 ft 0 in)
- Position: Defender

Senior career*
Years	Team	Apps	(Gls)
1993–1996	FC Azoti-Akademia Rustavi	62	(3)
1996	FC Metalurgi Rustavi	21	(0)
1997–1999	Skonto FC	54	(1)
2000	FC Alania Vladikavkaz	13	(0)
2000	FC Lokomotivi Tbilisi	15	(1)
2001–2002	FC Torpedo Kutaisi	21	(1)
2002–2003	FC Rubin Kazan	25	(0)
2004–2005	FC Dinamo Tbilisi	29	(2)
2005	FC Dinamo Sokhumi	1	(0)
2006	Beitar Jerusalem F.C.		
2006	FC Merani Tbilisi	1	(0)
2006–2007	FC Metalurh Zaporizhya	0	(0)
2007	FC Sioni Bolnisi	5	(0)
2007–2008	FC Olimpi Rustavi	22	(1)
2008	FC Sioni Bolnisi	0	(0)
2008–2010	FK Standard Sumgayit	26	(0)

International career
1998–2001	Georgia	21	(0)
- * Club domestic league appearances and goals

Levan Silagadze (Georgian: ლევან სილაგაძე; born 4 August 1976) is a former football defender from Georgia.

From 1992 to 1997, he played for the Rustavi clubs Imedi, Azoti and Gorda. In 1997, he was bought by Latvian champion team Skonto FC, who had a Georgian coach Revaz Dzodzuashvili. As Dzodzuashvili left the club in 1999, the future of Silagadze became uncertain, but he rejoined his old coach in various loan moves. In 2001, he played his last cap to date with the Georgian national team, having played 21 times in total since 1997. A somewhat unsuccessful spell in Russian team Rubin Kazan between 2002 and 2003 (despite winning the Russian league bronze in 2003) was followed by a transfer to Dinamo Tbilisi. In summer 2008, he moved to Standard Baku in Azerbaijan.
