= Pape Maguette Kebe =

Senegalese footballer

Personal information
- Date of birth: 28 December 1979 (age 46)
- Place of birth: Dakar, Senegal
- Height: 1.74 m (5 ft 9 in)
- Position: Defender

Youth career
- ASC Diaraf

Senior career*
Years	Team	Apps	(Gls)
1996–2004	ASC Diaraf	175	(9)
2003	→ Rubin Kazan (loan)	1	(0)
- * Club domestic league appearances and goals

Pape Maguette Kebe (born 28 December 1979) is a Senegalese former professional footballer who played as a defender.

== Career ==
Kebe began his career at ASC Diaraf and played one game in the Russian Premier League on loan for FC Rubin Kazan.

== Personal life ==
He is the younger brother of Kébé Baye.

== Honours ==
- Russian Premier League bronze: 2003
