= Tomáš Čížek =

Czech footballer

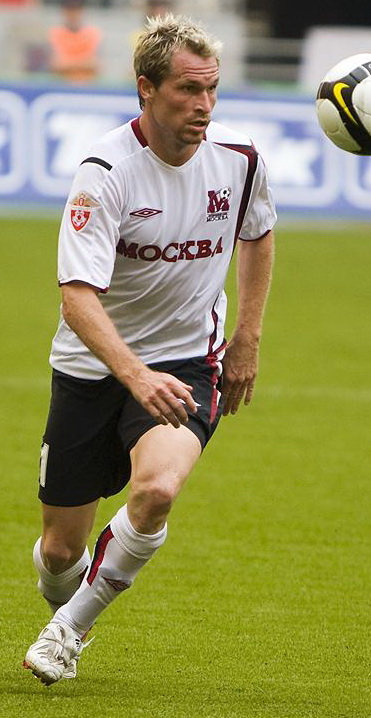
- Čížek in action for FC Moscow.

Personal information
- Full name: Tomáš Čížek
- Date of birth: 27 November 1978 (age 47)
- Place of birth: Děčín, Czechoslovakia
- Height: 1.87 m (6 ft 2 in)
- Position: Midfielder

Youth career
- 1985–1992: Pelikán Děčín
- 1992–1993: Teplice
- 1993–1995: Pelikán Děčín
- 1995–1997: Jablonec

Senior career*
Years	Team	Apps	(Gls)
1997–2001	Jablonec	88	(5)
1997	→ Pelikán Děčín (loan)		
2002	Sparta Prague	17	(2)
2003–2005	Rubin Kazan	59	(10)
2006–2008	Moscow	63	(5)
2008	Jablonec	2	(2)
2009	Alania Vladikavkaz	29	(6)
2009	Jablonec	7	(1)
2010–2012	Sibir Novosibirsk	68	(9)
2012–2015	Jablonec	66	(12)
2015–2017	Bohemians 1905	27	(3)

Managerial career
- 2023–: Jablonec (assistant)
- * Club domestic league appearances and goals

Tomáš Cízek (born 27 November 1978) is a Czech former professional footballer who played as a midfielder.

He played, among others, for Jablonec, Pelikán Děčín, and Sparta Prague in the Czech Republic, and for Rubin Kazan, FC Moscow, and Alania Vladikavkaz in Russia.
