= David Chaladze =

Georgian footballer

Personal information
- Full name: David Chaladze
- Date of birth: 22 January 1976 (age 50)
- Place of birth: Tbilisi, Georgia
- Position: Striker

Senior career*
Years	Team	Apps	(Gls)
1992–1994	Merani Tbilisi	41	(18)
1994–1995	Metalurgi Rustavi	21	(3)
1995	Temp Shepetivka	7	(1)
1995–1996	Metalurgi Rustavi	33	(20)
1997	Skonto Riga	20	(25)
1998	Alania Vladikavkaz	16	(5)
1998–1999	Racing Mechelen	2	(2)
1999–2001	Skonto Riga	57	(47)
2002–2003	Rubin Kazan	45	(23)
2004–2005	Anorthosis Famagusta	10	(2)
2005–2006	Skonto Riga	15	(2)

International career
1997	Georgia U21	3	(0)
1998–2003	Georgia	4	(1)
- * Club domestic league appearances and goals

David Chaladze (Georgian: დავით ჩალაძე; born 22 January 1976) is a Georgian former professional footballer who played as a striker.

== Honours ==
- Virsliga top scorer: 1997 (25 goals)
- Russian First Division top scorer: 2002 (20 goals).
