= Oleg Nechayev =

Russian footballer

Personal information
- Full name: Oleg Mikhailovich Nechayev
- Date of birth: 25 June 1971 (age 55)
- Place of birth: Konstantinovka, Russian SFSR
- Height: 1.85 m (6 ft 1 in)
- Positions: Forward; midfielder

Senior career*
Years	Team	Apps	(Gls)
1988–1993	FC Rubin Kazan	155	(27)
1993–1995	FC Rotor Volgograd	62	(9)
1996–1998	FC Lada-Grad Dimitrovgrad	115	(51)
1999–2000	FC Rubin Kazan	64	(17)
2001–2002	FC Amkar Perm	37	(8)
2002–2004	FC Rubin Kazan	40	(5)
2004	FC Lada Togliatti	11	(1)

Managerial career
- 2005: FC Rubin-2 Kazan (assistant)
- 2005–2007: FC Rubin-2 Kazan
- 2008: FC Alnas Almetyevsk (assistant)
- 2014: FC Rubin Kazan (reserves assistant)
- 2014–2015: FC Rubin Kazan (reserves)
- 2015: FC Rubin Kazan (reserves assistant)
- 2015–2016: FC Aktobe (assistant)
- 2017–2021: FC Neftekhimik Nizhnekamsk (assistant)
- 2021–2022: FC Kuban Krasnodar (assistant)
- 2022–2023: FC Kuban Krasnodar (caretaker)
- 2023: FC Rubin Kazan (assistant)
- 2024: FC Kuban Krasnodar (assistant)
- 2024–2025: FC Rotor Volgograd (assistant)
- * Club domestic league appearances and goals

Oleg Mikhailovich Nechayev (Russian: Олег Михайлович Нечаев; born 25 June 1971) is a Russian professional football coach and a former player.

== Club career ==
He made his professional debut in the Soviet Second League in 1988 for FC Rubin Kazan. He played 2 games in the UEFA Cup 1994–95 for FC Rotor Volgograd.

== Honours ==
- Russian Premier League runner-up: 1993.
- Russian Premier League bronze: 2003.
- Russian Cup finalist: 1995.
