= FC Rubin Kazan =

Russian association football club based in Kazan, Tatarstan

Rubin Kazan
- Full name: ООО Футбольный клуб "Рубин" Казань; OOO Football Club Rubin Kazan
- Nicknames: Rubinovye; Krasno-Zelyonye (The Red-Greens)
- Founded: 20 April 1958; 68 years ago
- Ground: Ak Bars Arena
- Capacity: 45,379
- President: Marat Safiullin
- Manager: Oleg Kuzmin (caretaker)
- League: Russian Premier League
- 2025–26: 8th of 16
- Website: www.rubin-kazan.ru
Home colours	Away colours	Third colours

FC Rubin Kazan (Russian: ФК Рубин Казань; Tatar: ФК Рубин Казан) is a Russian professional football club based in the city of Kazan. They play in the Russian Premier League. Founded in 1958, Rubin played its first-ever top flight season in 2003. It has remained there through the 2025–26 season, winning the Russian Premier League championship in 2008 and 2009. After one season in the second tier, the club returned to the RPL for the 2023–24 season. The club also won the 2011–12 Russian Cup. The team plays in the Ak Bars Arena.

== History ==
FC Rubin Kazan was previously called Iskra from 1958 to 1964 and Rubin-TAN from 1992 to 1993. The name Rubin means "Ruby".

Having never played in the Soviet Top League, the football club joined the Russian First Division in 1992 and fell to the Russian Second Division in 1994. The mayor of Kazan at the time, Kamil Iskhakov, purchased the team in 1996. Rubin won the Second Division in 1997 and was promoted back to the First Division the following season. The next four seasons, the team finished above 8th place. Finally winning the title in 2002, Rubin was promoted to the Russian Premier League for the first time in 2003. Rubin finished third in its debut season to qualify for the UEFA Cup. The team faced a setback in the 2004 campaign finishing in 10th place, but 2005 saw them finish fourth, again qualifying the team for the UEFA Cup.

=== The Flower of Sentyabrev's Epoch (1958–1965) ===
The year of 1958 came, and the team formed a part of Class B of the USSR Championship, because of successful performances and the Class B expanding. The debut was on 20 April in Kherson. The team lost to local "Spartak" 2–4. In 1958 "Iskra" took 14th place.

In 1959 "Iskra" was headed by a 50-year-old specialist Nikolay Sentyabrev. Within the next 12 years the post of a head coach of the team was occupied.

The 1960 season was even more successful. After the first round having only one defeat from "Zvezda" (Perm) the kazanners were among the leaders of the zone. But during the second half "Iskra" improved and finished 4th.

In 1960, Tsentralnyi stadium was founded. On 21 August 1960 "Iskra" played a debut game in a new arena against Metallurg (Kamensk-Uralsky) – 2–1.

In 1961 the kazanners again spent the strong first half of the championship and looked much worse in the second round. The gap from the leaders was one point. That year "Iskra" made its way to the last 16 of the USSR Cup, where it lost a rematch to Dynamo (Moscow). In 1962 and 1963 the kazanners took traditional 3rd place.

The year of 1964 became the turning-point. Unsuccessful start of the championship was compensated with 15 matches without a loss in a row at the finish. As a result – second position in the zone and an ability to continue struggle for Class A entrance. But the final round was unfortunate at this time.

During the off-season the club's name was changed to Rubin. In decisive game against "Sokol" (Saratov) "Rubin" has won 2–1 (Teterkin, Golubev) and got a ticket to Class A first time in its history. "Rubin" returned to Kazan with silver medals.

=== The End of Sentyabrev's Epoch (1966–1971) ===
Season 1966 was due to answer the question whether Rubin, a newcomer of Class A, was able to gain a foothold and to survive a competition with more experienced clubs. Club coaches counted on the footballers succeeded in the previous year. First three games were played away. After a zero draw in Batumi and a loss from "Kuban" in Krasnodar the kazanners gained revenge from "Spartak" in Nalchik for the loss in the final of 1965. 2–1 – that was the first win in Class A.

Kazan had to wait for the grand opening of the season until May, 2. That day 22,000 spectators greeted the win over "Dynamo" from Kirovabad. In the final table "Rubin" stands at the honorable 5th position.

Next year of 1967 considerable changes happened in the squad. The leaders of last years Fomin, Golubev and Novichkov finished to play for the team. "Rubin" had to start forming the middle line from the beginning.

A the final standings "Rubin" has raised its position if to compare with the previous season, it was the 4th position. In USSR Cup the kazanners succeeded in achieving 1/8 final, where they lost to "Chornomorets" (Odesa) – 1–3. Next year of 1968 Kazan club reduced its positions – the 5th place, but some noticeable events occurred during the season.

In the season of 1969 "Rubin" was close to change the Second Group of Class A for the First one. At the Second Stage "Rubin" in one point left behind the winner – "SKA" (Khabarovsk). And the team repeated the success of 1967, reached 1/8 final of USSR Cup, where has lost to "Sudostroitel" Nikolaev at the extra-time.

In 1970 the structure of the football tournament was modified. United First League was made, and 22 best-of-1969 teams were included.

On a legal ground "Rubin" took his place among them. The debut was April, 11 in Krasnodar (0–1). After that an outdoor draw followed in Kharkov with "Metallist" – 1–1, Viktor Kolotov scored the first goal in the First league. Later followed several wins. In the season-1970 "Rubin" resulted at the 8th position. Hard times came. The season of 1971 the team finished at the last 22nd position and has left the First league.

=== White line, black line (1972–1977) ===
In 1972 "Rubin" has been participating in the 5th zone of the Second League, which included mainly clubs of Povolzhye and Middle Asia. During the whole season the kazanners experienced serious problems in the attack. Frankly speaking, after the 21nd matchday the team had only 14 goals scored (5 of them were annulled because 2 teams has left the tournament). In the last game of the year "Rubin" has beat "Torpedo" from Togliatii 1–0 and took the 7th place and left the opponent on the 8th one.

The season of 1973 was to be more successful. After a year's interval Murad Zadikashvili has returned from Kutaisi. Three clubs has started to change each other in the top of the league in the struggle for the only ticket to the Semifinal tournament. These teams were "Uralmash" (Sverdlovsk), "Rubin" and "Kord" from Balakovo. Kazanners were the second ones at the final lap. "Uralmash" had just 3 points more. In RSFSR Cup, which was held as an alternative to USSR Cup, "Rubin" reached Semi-final (the club's best result in this tournament), where lost 0–1 to "Vulkan" (Petropavlovsk-Kamchatsky) in an outdoor game. That year (1973) on May, 1 a 24-year-old masseur Eugeny Golov started to work in "Rubin". From that moment "Rubin" has become an integral part of his life. He had passed all steps of a club hierarchy: masseur – doctor – administrator – first president (since 1990) – director (1995–99 and since 2005).

Before the season of 1974 "Rubin" has practically lost no players of a senior squad. In the final table "Rubin" was the 2nd. In a stubborn struggle kazanners could stand up for this position in a semi-final pellet in Frunze and in a final in Sochi. As a result – an overall 2nd place in the Second League and a pass to the First League.

In 1975 the team was headed by Boris Batanov from "Torpedo" (Moscow), a specialist with a name, indeed, he had a success only as a footballer. After the first half of the year "Rubin" was 17th, and Batanov has left a captain's bridge, which was occupied by Yuri Markov again. Kazanners took 13 points in last 8 games and finished on 11th position.

The beginning of 1976 has encouraged. However, after that 21 matches without any win followed. As a result – the 17th place and a difficultly saved registration in the First League.

In 1977 an attempt to renew a team was undertaken. Result was the last 20th place.

=== The times of stagnation (1978–1991) ===
In 1978, the organizers of the competitions have identified "Rubin" in internationalist 4th zone, where in addition to Russian clubs were 13 teams of three republics – Georgia, Armenia and Azerbaijan. Kazan started poorly, taking on a long Georgian-Armenian exit, which consisted of 6 matches, only 2 points. But slowly the team began to build momentum, and, eventually, ended the season in 6th place.

In the season of 1979 Kazan set anti-record – 19th place in the second league. During the season in 23 guest matches had been won only 1 game.

In 1980, instead of Aleksei Alekseevich Beryuchevskogo, who led the "Rubin" in two previous seasons, to the post of head coach came Valeriy Salnikov. To the end of the season Kazan came in 10th place, and again left without a head coach.

The next attempt to find a suitable mentor for the team finally succeeded in 1981. Credibility, which was enough for the next 7 years (with a break in 1983–84), get Vladimir Mikhailov, in past well-known football player of Moscow Torpedo. In the final table in 1981, Rubin was in 5th place.

In the next in 1982 an attempt was made to win in the zone. In a bitter struggle with Chelyabinsk "Lokomotiv" Kazan in the end gave the first line to the Ural team. Vadim Popov scored 24 goals, updating the club record for the season. Season-1983 did not become a logical continuation of the 1982th, only a 5th place in the zone. In 1984, Rubin participated even worse. With the transfer Vadim Popov to Omsk Irtysh in the attack appeared unsolvable problems. Toothless team action in the attack was partly offset confident playing defensive line, led by Kikhtenko and Martynov, so Rubin could not fall below 10th place.

The game in attack was fixed in season 1985, when to the team came Vladimir Gavrilov, best scorer of "Rubin" in its history. His scoring quality Gavrilov showed in the season-1986, when with 27 balls he became the best scorer of the second league. We can only guess how things would have developed for "Rubin" in the next 1987, if Gavrilov stays in the team. But he decided to try his strength in the first league and moved to the Voronezh "Fakel", and when in autumn after the injury he returned to Kazan, the fans saw on the field only a pale shadow of a formidable striker.

Two of the final season of 80-ths did not bring positive emotions. Moving up did not work, and Rubin began to sink lower and lower on the standings. In 1988, the team score points, mainly due to competently organized games in the defensive by the coach Alexei Alexandrovich Semyonov, who replaced Mikhailov.

At the end of the 1989 season, when Kazan finished in 12th place, Ivan Zolotukhin was appointed head coach of Rubin. An honored coach of Russia, he was widely respected in the country. Players and fans referred to him as “Grandfather,” a nickname reflecting their regard for him.

In 1990, before the team set the goal – to get into the "buffer" league (intermediate between the first and second), for which it was necessary to take place not less than the second. After a magnificent season, Kazan scored equal points with Togliatti "Lada" and gave her a second line due to a smaller number of victories. The following season, "Rubin" make up for all the previous failures. During the Championship from Moscow came a striker Sergei Surov, who together with Vladimir Gavrilov and 20-year-old Oleg Nechaev for three scored 44 goals, making the most formidable line of attack in the zone. Most of all got "EVM" from Ruzayevka, which Kazan scored seven unanswered goals (the biggest victory of the "Rubin" in the championships of the USSR). As a result, the first round Rubin passed without a single defeat. Unbeaten run was interrupted only in the 32 round, but by the time Kazan was unequivocal leader of the tournament. To finish of the championship in 1991, Rubin came first, finishing with dignity "Soviet" phase of its history.

=== A step away from total collapse (1992–1995) ===
After the collapse of the Soviet Union broke up into separate tournaments and the championship of the Union. The result is that instead of the union "buffer" league "Rubin" was the first league of first Championship of Russia. In season 1992, it consisted of three territorial zones. Kazan had been included in the central.

In winter, from Moscow came the tragic news – on 13 February died Ivan Zolotukhin.

After Zolotukhin a head coach of Rubin became Alexander Ivchenko, previously worked with Omsk Irtysh. In the off-season left the team: Kalachev Igor, Sergei Surov and who decided to continue a career in Poland, Vladimir Gavrilov. Ivchenko brought from Omsk scorer Marat Mulasheva and midfielder Sergei Osipov, came from the Kirov technically Moiseev.

The first game in the championship of Russia on 25 April Rubin lost to Metallurg Magnitogorsk (0–1). Then, in Bashkortostan got its first victory – over Gastello from Ufa, the only goal scored Vadim Potapov. In Kazan, the fans saw their team on 6 May, when in a double-edged uncompromising struggle was beaten Chelyabinsk "Zenit" (3–2). FC Rubin Kazan during the season was in the area 5–7 positions. The leadership in the area immediately took KAMAZ, which in the end got the only ticket to the major league.

In 1993, "Rubin" got a task to take in the tournament of central zone of the first league place no lower than seventh. The reason for this was that from next season the best in the championship-93 teams of three zones were to form a single first league (the current first division), in which representatives from the central zone were "booked" 7 vacancies.

Shortly after the start of the championship refused to finance the team its chief sponsor CAPO Gorbunov. In June, recently approved in the position of head coach Victor Avraamovich Lukashenko left "Rubin". The new coach became Mourad Vahtangovich Zadikashvili. Difficult financial situation was fixed after selling in Volgograd "Rotor" team leaders Oleg Nechaev and Rustem Khuzin (but soon returned to "Rubin" till the end of the season on loan). In the end the season Kazan finished on 8th place, only losing a point to Nizhnekamsk "Neftechimik" and dropped into the second league.

The following year, 1994, coaches Zadikashvili and Semenov assemble a team literally bit by bit. Because of the continuing financial problems from the last season in the team left only 6 players: Grishin, Danilin, Ravil, Blagov, Tatarkin and Kamkov, the rest went to other clubs. Rubin had to resort to the services of veterans and young students of urban football. At the beginning of the season, the first time in the history of the club did there was no money to go to the next game in Gorodishe and Volzhski. As a consequence, two technical defeat of 0–3 and a warning that in case of repeated failure to appear, the team will be disqualified from the tournament. Later, Kazan for the third time staying at home, this time ignoring Tula. Fortunately, and for this act "Rubin" was not disqualified from the championship. One of the key games of the season took place on 2 October in Yoshkar-Ola. 5 minutes before the final whistle, the only goal was scored by our captain, Rubin Ravil, thereby leaving the local "Druzhba" in last place. Residence in the second division was maintained.

In the off-season club finally "divorced" with CAPO Gorbunov and was dependent only on the city. Resolution of the head of administration of Kazan on 13 March 1995 No. 276 were registered municipal institution "Football Club Rubin".

Already during the tournament-1995 in the club there were personnel changes. Instead of a retired Zadikashvili came to the team Vladimir Borisovich Saveliev and Oleg Flegontov, who became head coach, respectively, and the director of the team. Due to intense activity guideline "tandem" Golov-Flegontov, in a short time managed to attract to the team several good level players, who helped the club does not fall lower rank. Only in the final round of the championship determined the fourth failure, who left the second league (with the other three all was clear much earlier). It became "Torpedo" from Pavlov. It had a point less than Rubin.

Kazan team, at the last moment managed to jump off the footboard of the train going to the third league.

=== Recovering lost ground (1996–2002) ===
The turning point in the modern history of Rubin Kazan came in 1996, when the patron of the club, Kamil Iskhakrov, became the mayor of Kazan, and helped to improve the financial health of the club. In addition, he set up a two-part goal for the club: to first advance to the first league, and then to the Premier League. With the club finances in order, Rubin Kazan were able to prepare for the season under more relaxed circumstances. As head coach, the experienced Igor Volchok was hired; he too devoted himself to the goal set out by Iskharov. Eighteen new players came to Rubin Kazan, including some who had played for the club previously: Sergey Moiseyev, Rashid Zainutdinov, and Oleg Mironov. In addition, two skilled forwards joined the proceedings: Vladimir Pantyushenko and Rustam Zabirov. The result was that Rubin Kazan finished in 6th place in 1996.

In the following year, 1997, the goal to reach the first league became more complicated through the fact that, according to the rules, only one club from the central zone of the second league could qualify. For this year, Rubin Kazin was strengthened by the return of some of its best players: Sergei Kharlamov, Rustem Bulatov, Airat Ahmetgaliev, Rustem Khuzin. Valery Aleskarov from Nizhnekamsk performed duties as goalkeeper, and Andrey Knyazev from Magnitogorsk played at the top. Having taken the lead in their zone after the third round, the club went on to solidify its position and were actually able to finish first, scoring 102 points out of 120 possible. Thus, the goal of returning the club to the first division was fulfilled. Furthermore, adding to the success of the club in this season, Rubin Kazan managed to win 13 games in a row. Andrey Knyazev was the best scorer of the season, scoring 30 goals (25 of them in the championship). The 1997 season is also notable for Rubin Kazan in that it was the first time in 22 years that the club had a reserve team.

Rubin Kazan went on to excel in the Cup of Russia in 1997–98. First, they beat Fakel Voronej, then Lokomotive Nizhniy Novgorod, and then Arsenal from Tula. In the game against Tula, a goal by Airat Ahmetgaliev became decisive, as it was scored only two minutes before the end of the match, delighting the 15,000 fans in the Tsentralny stadium. Later in 1998, Volchok retired as head coach, and was replaced by Alexander Sergeyevich Irkhin, although he would only last for the remainder of the season. In the first division championship of this year, Rubin Kazan finished in 7th place.

In December 1998, one of Russia's most acclaimed coaches, Pavel Sadyrin took over training duties from Irkhin. He too, however, would only stay for one contract year, enjoying little success with Rubin Kazan, which again finished in 7th place in the 1999 season. In order to fulfil with ambition of playing in the top division of the Russianc championship, Victor Petrovich Antihovich was hired for the 2000 season. At this point, fifteen players left the team, four of which moved into top division clubs: Okroshidze, Bulatov, and Lysenko transferred to CSKA Sennikov, while Khuzin went to Amkar Perm. During the 2000 season, Saratov "Sokol" was the clear favorite for the 1st place, while Rubin Kazin struggled with Torpedo-ZIL for the second qualifying slot to the top division. In a dramatic meeting at the end of the season, Kazan was in 3td place, behind Torpedo by only two points.

The 2001 season did not begin well for Rubin Kazan. As a consequence, there was another change of coaches, as Antihovic was replaced by Kurban Bekievich Berdiyev from Smolensk Kristall. Under his leadership, the club finished the season in 8th place. In the following year, a number of qualified players with experience from the top division were invited to the club: David Chaladze, Gennady Semin, Michail Sinev, and Andrei Konovalov. Overall, the season was a great success, with the club winning 22 of 34 games, and only suffering six defeats. Striker David Chaladze tied with Vyacheslav Kamoltsev for the title of best scorer; both scored 20 goals. Chaladze became the third player in the club's history to scoring four goals in one game, in the match against Krasnoyarsk Metallurg.

=== 2003–2005 ===
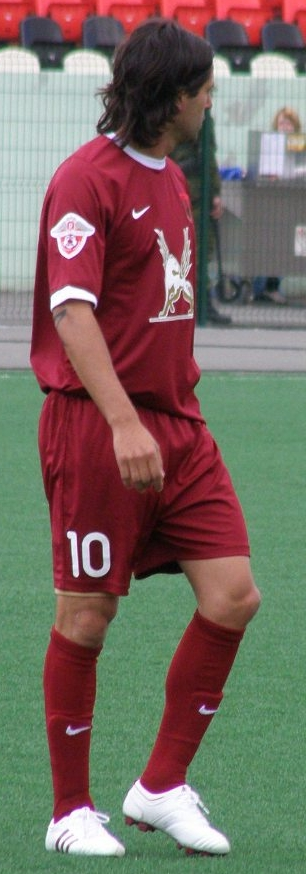
Alejandro Domínguez, one of Rubin's most influential players since the team's inception in the Russian Premier League.

2003 saw great changes in Rubin Kazan, as a result of the arrival of a large number of foreign players, including MacBeth Sibaya, Pape Kebe, Andrés Scotti, Tomáš Čížek, and Jiří Novotný. The season began with a defeat against CSKA Moscow. This was followed by the team's first victory in a difficult game against Torpedo-Metallurg. Victories at home over Torpedo Moscow (3–1) and Spartak Moscow (1–0) pulled the club up to a mid-table position. This was followed by 10 matches without defeat, which took Kazan to second place. Fortune changed quickly when a serious injury to goalkeeper Sergei Kozko led to a losing streak. After a home defeat to Zenit St. Petersburg, Rubin dropped to 5th place. Winning the last 3 games of the season — against Krylia Sovetov, Torpedo-Metallurg and reigning champions CSKA Moscow — Rubin Kazan unexpectedly snatched third place.

In 2004 Rubin began on an optimistic note. Almost nobody left the team, and incoming transfers looked promising. The first victory in the 2005 season came only in the 8th round over Spartak (2–0). It allowed Rubin to leave the last place. Then Kazan managed to climb in the standings, but 7 games without a win once again led Rubin in the danger zone, out of which the team managed to climb only due to a good finish of the season. Tenth place, of course, was seen as a failure after the excellent 2003 season. The UEFA Cup ended in the third round, after a 2–0 away victory Rubin lost their home match 0–3.

=== 2006–2009 ===
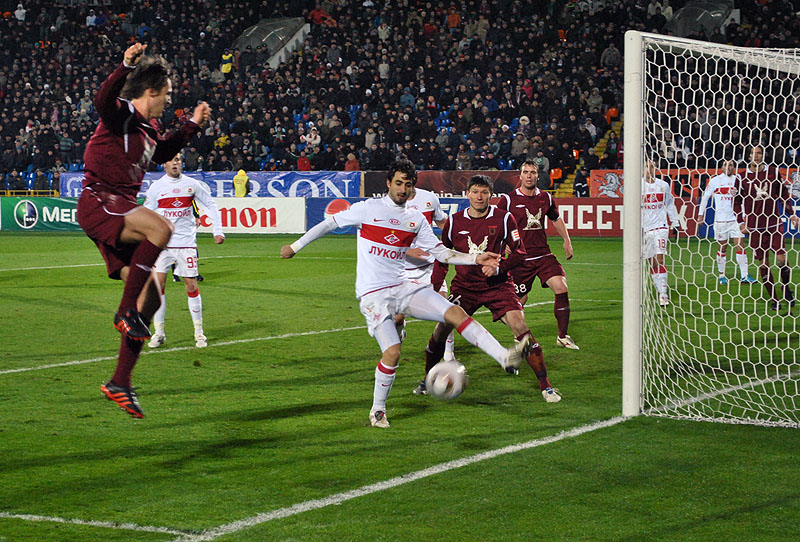
Rubin Kazan — Spartak Moscow

In 2006, Rubin had a new president when the head of the club became Alexander P. Gusev, who replaced Kamil Iskhakov. The team did well enough in the Russian Premier League to take part in European cup competitions. In August Rubin the second time in its history played in UEFA Cup. In the second qualifying round Kazan easily passed Belarusian BATE Borisov (3–0 at home and 2–0 away). The next stage Kazan lost to Parma from Italy (both matches 0–1). Russian Championship Rubin finished on fifth position, which allowed it to play next season in Intertoto Cup.

In the 2007 season, again there was a major refurbishment of the team. Rubin added a number of players, but many players left the team before 2008, due to the poor performance of the team: 10th position in the championship of Russia and the defeat in UEFA Intertoto Cup by old rivals Rapid Vienna. The season was further marred by the death of defender Lenar Gilmullin, a Kazan native who played for the first team.

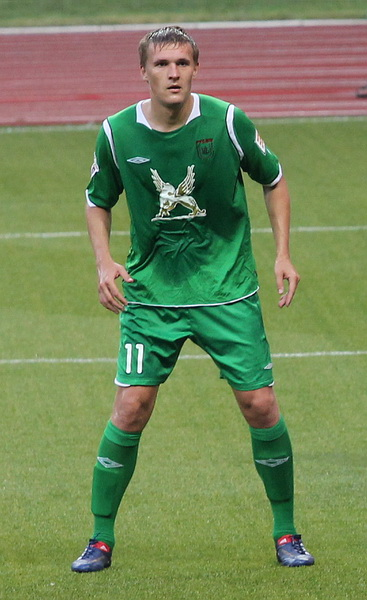
Alexander Bukharov

In 2008, Rubin won the league championship to qualify for the 2009–10 UEFA Champions League Group stage, making them the easternmost team to play in the competition. Their championship season began with a league record seven consecutive wins, including victories against defending champions Zenit St. Petersburg. Rubin clinched its first championship in club history and became only the third club from outside Moscow to win the Russian Premier League (after Spartak-Alania Vladikavkaz and Zenit St. Petersburg).

On 20 October 2009, Rubin recorded an upset over Barcelona in the UEFA Champions League by winning 2–1 at Camp Nou. This was followed by a 0–0 draw at home two weeks, also against Barcelona. On 21 November 2009, Rubin secured a 0–0 draw against Zenit St. Petersburg to win the Russian Premier League championship for the second season in a row.

=== 2009 controversy ===
In September 2009, Rubin were the unknowing participants in a bizarre transfer saga involving four Levski Sofia players (Zhivko Milanov, Youssef Rabeh, Darko Tasevski and Zé Soares). The Bulgarian champions received a fax, supposedly from the Kazan team, offering to buy the footballers. The quoted sum was €7 million. On 20 September 2009, the four players, accompanied by a Levski representative, travelled to Moscow to undergo a medical examination, but the deal fell through, as the phony Rubin representative offered lower salaries than those originally agreed. Official Rubin representatives denied any knowledge of the whole affair, maintaining that they knew nothing about the players in question. It turned out that Levski had fallen victims to fraudsters. It is thought that the incident was masterminded to defraud bookmakers by placing large bets against Levski in their derby match against city rivals CSKA Sofia.

=== Cups successes (2009–2012) ===
In 2010 Kazan Team started the year with the victory in "Commonwealth of Independent States Cup". In this tournament "Rubin" was presented by Junior team led by Yuri Utkulbayev. In the final Kazan team beat FC Aktobe, the champion of Kazakhstan with the score 5–2. In March "Rubin" won the Russian Super Cup for the first time. In the frosty "Luzhniki" Kazan team won CSKA with the score 1–0.

On UEFA Champions League 2010–11 "Rubin" got once again in the group with the great team of European football "Barcelona". The score of the match in Kazan was 1–1. On the return match Catalan Club won with the score 2–0. The victory in the home match with Copenhagen and 3 draws gave a chance to take the 3rd place in the group and had a UEFA Europa League's qualification for Round of 32, where Kazan team lost to FC Twente from the Netherlands (0–2 and 2–2).

In 2010 "Rubin" took the 3rd place in Russian Championship, so that was the second bronze medal in the history of "Rubin". Due to the mentioned "Rubin" got a chance to start in UEFA Europa League for the third time, this time from the Qualification Round. There "Rubin" knocked out one of the strongest clubs of East Europe, "Dynamo Kyiv" with the score 2–0 and 2–1, but after "Rubin" lost to French "Lyon" (1–3 and 1–1) and went to UEFA Europa League. In the second most prestigious European club football tournament Kazan team took the second place in the group and reached the Round of 32, where "Rubin" lost to Greek "Olympiacos" (0–1 and 0–1).

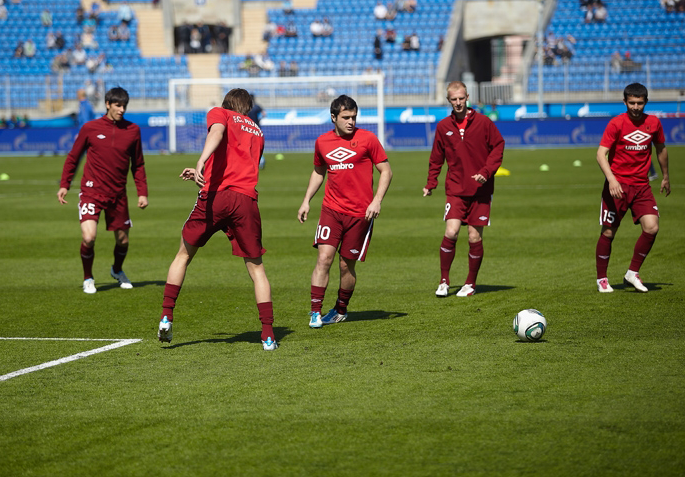
Zenit-Rubin. 15 May 2011

The first game of the season was a League of Europe game against the Dutch FC Twente. The final score was 0–2 in favor of the Dutch. In the next match in Enschede, the score was 2–2 with Rubin's goals scored by Christian Noboa and Cristian Ansaldi

In the end of May 2012 there were the new changes at the management of the club. Dmitry Samarenkin, the president of the club, left his post. By the decision of the Supervisory Board Valery Sorokin was appointed to the position. In summer there was another assignment, Andrey Gromov was appointed to the position of Director General. In July "Rubin" in the match for Russian Super Cup won "Zenit" from Saint Petersburg with the score 2–0 and became the trophy winner.

In the first match of the championship, Rubin defeated Kuban in Krasnodar, with a score of 2–0. Goals were scored by Alan Kasaev and Christian Noboa. The second round was held in Kazan Terek Grozny, with Rubin again winning 2–0. Goals: Gökdeniz Karadeniz and Christian Noboa. In the third round in Makhachkala Rubin lost to local Anji. In the fourth round a match against Spartak Nalchik ended in a draw. In the fifth round, Rubin suffered a major defeat by CSKA Moscow 2–0. In the sixth round Rubin played against Amkar Perm to a draw, 1–1, with the only Rubin goal scored by Alexander Ryazantsev. An Amkar player helped the Rubin Captain Roman Sharonov cut the ball into his own net. In the seventh round there was another draw in Samara playing against Krylya Sovetov, with a score of 2–2. In the eighth round, Rubin faced Premier League newcomers FC Krasnodar at home, the score of 2–1 was in favor of Kazan: two goals for Rubin scored by Gökdeniz Karadeniz, while Roman Sharonov again scored an own goal.

=== 2012–2022 ===
On 18 October 2018, the club was banned by UEFA for one year from participating in European competition due to FFP violations. The club did not qualify for either the 2019–20 season or 2020–21 season of the Champions League or Europa League and therefore, the ban expired. On 19 December 2019, Leonid Viktorovich Slutsky became head coach of Rubin.

Rubin finished the 2020–21 Russian Premier League season in 4th place. It qualified for European competition (UEFA Europa Conference League) for the first time since the 2015–16 season.

As all Russian teams, Rubin was suspended from the European Club Association in 2022, with the Russian invasion of Ukraine cited as the reason.

=== Relegation and promotion (2022–present) ===
Rubin was relegated back to the second tier after losing on the last day of the 2021–22 Russian Premier League season to FC Ufa. On 15 November 2022, Leonid Viktorovich Slutsky retired as head coach on his own will.

On 20 May 2023, Rubin secured promotion back to the Russian Premier League for the 2023–24 season.

== Players ==
=== Current squad ===
As of 24 September 2026

Note: Flags indicate national team as defined under FIFA eligibility rules; some limited exceptions apply. Players may hold more than one non-FIFA nationality.

No.	Pos.	Nation	Player
2	DF	RUS	Yegor Teslenko
3	DF	HON	Denil Maldonado
4	DF	RUS	Konstantin Nizhegorodov
5	DF	MNE	Igor Vujačić
6	MF	ARM	Ugochukwu Iwu
7	MF	RUS	Ulvi Babayev (on loan from Dynamo Moscow)
8	MF	SRB	Bogdan Jočić
10	FW	ITA	Eddie Salcedo
11	MF	ALB	Nazmi Gripshi
12	DF	COL	Anderson Arroyo
13	DF	UZB	Jakhongir Urozov (on loan from Dinamo Samarqand)
14	MF	CHI	Ignacio Saavedra
18	DF	RUS	Maksim Ignatyev
22	MF	KOS	Veldin Hoxha
23	DF	RUS	Ruslan Bezrukov

No.	Pos.	Nation	Player
25	GK	RUS	Artur Nigmatullin
27	DF	RUS	Aleksei Gritsayenko
38	GK	RUS	Yevgeni Staver
43	FW	FRA	Jacques Siwe
44	FW	RUS	Daniil Kuznetsov
51	DF	RUS	Ilya Rozhkov
59	FW	RUS	Daniil Motorin
70	DF	RUS	Dmitri Kabutov
71	DF	RUS	Ilya Samoshnikov (on loan from Spartak Moscow)
77	MF	AUT	Aleksandar Jukić
86	GK	RUS	Nikita Korets
89	MF	RUS	Matvey Ivanov
98	DF	RUS	Nikita Lobov
99	FW	KOS	Dardan Shabanhaxhaj

=== Out on loan ===
Note: Flags indicate national team as defined under FIFA eligibility rules; some limited exceptions apply. Players may hold more than one non-FIFA nationality.

No.	Pos.	Nation	Player
—	DF	SRB	Uroš Drezgić (at Mačva Šabac until 31 December 2026)
—	MF	RUS	Marat Apshatsev (at Dynamo Makhachkala until 30 June 2027)
—	MF	RUS	Enri Mukba (at Neftekhimik Nizhnekamsk until 30 June 2027)

No.	Pos.	Nation	Player
—	MF	RUS	Nikita Vasilyev (at Neftekhimik Nizhnekamsk until 30 June 2027)
—	FW	ALB	Marvin Çuni (at Olimpija Ljubljana until 30 June 2027)

== Coaching staff ==
Role	Name
Manager	(Spain) Franc Artiga
Assistant Manager	(Russia) Oleg Kuzmin
Assistant Manager	(Germany) Benjamin Duray
Goalkeeping coach	(Russia) Sergei Kozko
Conditioning coach	(Spain) Javier Noya
Fitness coach	(Spain) Víctor Gómez Medel
Video analyst	(Russia) Ilyas Fatkullin

== Honours ==
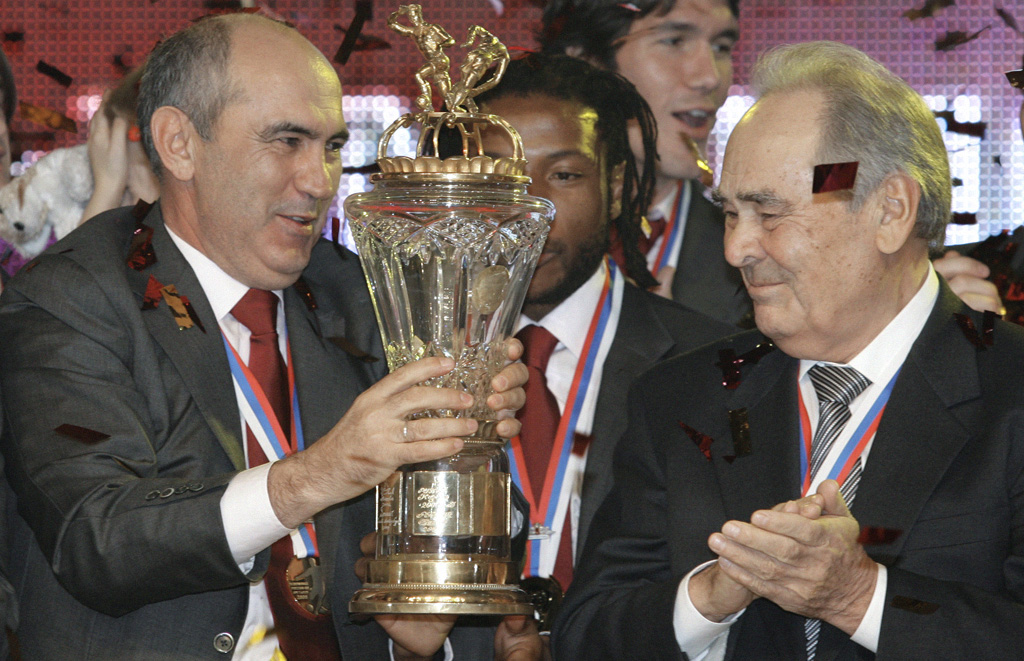
Kurban Berdyev and Tatarstan President Mintimer Shaimiev with the Russian Premier League Champions Cup during the ceremony of awarding FC Rubin with the Russian Premier League gold medals

=== Domestic competitions ===
==== League ====
- Russian Premier League

Champions: 2008, 2009

- Russian First League

Winners: 2002, 2022–23

==== Cups ====
- Russian Cup

Winners: 2011–12

- Russian Super Cup

Winners: 2010, 2012

=== International competitions ===
- Commonwealth of Independent States Cup

Winners: 2010

== League and Cup history ==
=== Soviet Union ===
Season	Div.	Pos.	Pl.	W	D	L	GS	GA	P	Cup	Europe	Top scorer (League)	Head Coach
1936 (spring)	3rd	4	7	3	2	2	14	15	15	R32	—		
1936 (autumn)	3rd	1	7	5	1	1	18	9	18	R32	—		
1937	2nd	7	12	1	3	8	11	28	17	QF	—		
1938										R16	—		
1939	2nd	23	22	4	1	17	20	50	9	R32	—		
1940–1945
1946	3rd, "Povolzhye"	7									—		
1947	2nd, RSFSR-1	7	22	8	3	11	34	20	19	R128	—		
1948	2nd, RSFSR-1	1	26	20	3	3	71	18	43	R32	—		
1948	2nd, Final	5	5	1	2	2	4	6	4	R32	—		
1949	2nd, RSFSR-3	9	24	6	7	11	33	42	19	R128	—		
1950–1958
1958	2nd, Group 1	14	30	7	4	19	24	56	18	R256	—		
1959	2nd, Group 1	5	28	12	9	7	36	27	33		—		
1960	2nd, RSFSR-4	4	28	15	7	6	42	22	37	R256	—		
1961	2nd, RSFSR-2	3	24	11	9	4	31	22	31	R32	—	(Soviet Union) Tufatulin – 17	
1962	2nd, RSFSR-4	3	30	13	12	5	47	23	38	R256	—		
1963	3rd, RSFSR-4	3	30	17	6	7	47	28	40	R64	—		
1964	3rd, RSFSR-2	2	32	13	15	4	40	15	41	R1024	—		
1964	3rd, Semi-final	4	5	2	1	2	6	5	5	R1024	—		
1965	3rd, RSFSR-2	2	36	20	9	7	52	22	49		—		
1965	3rd, Semi-final	1	4	4	0	0	9	4	8		—		
1965	3rd, Final	2	3	2	0	1	4	4	4		—		
1966	2nd (Group 1)	5	32	15	9	8	32	23	39	R32	—		
1967	2nd (Group 1)	4	38	16	12	10	36	26	44	R16	—		
1968	2nd (Group 3)	5	40	19	9	12	52	31	47	R256	—	(Soviet Union) Vorobyov – 13	(Soviet Union) Sentyabryov
1969	2nd (Group 2)	2	34	17	12	5	40	21	46	R16	—	(Soviet Union) Vorobyov – 9	(Soviet Union) Sentyabryov
1970	2nd	8	42	18	10	14	36	42	46	R128	—	(Soviet Union) Kolotov – 9	(Soviet Union) Sentyabryov
1971	2nd	22	42	9	13	20	31	57	31	R32	—	(Soviet Union) Penzin – 8	(Soviet Union) Sentyabryov
1972	3rd, Group 5	7	32	11	14	7	24	22	36		—	(Soviet Union) A. Yashin – 8	(Soviet Union) Kalugin
1973	3rd, Group 5	2	32	21	5	6	58	26	47		—	(Soviet Union) V. Kadyrov – 15	(Soviet Union) Kalugin
1974	3rd, Group 4	2	40	20	11	9	53	33	51		—		
1974	3rd, Semi-final	2	5	3	0	2	7	7	6		—		
1974	3rd, Final	2	5	2	2	1	9	6	6		—		
1975	2nd	11	38	12	13	13	37	51	37	R64	—	(Soviet Union) A. Yashin – 6 (Soviet Union) Baiguzov – 6	(Soviet Union) Batanov
1976	2nd	17	38	6	18	14	39	55	30	R64	—	(Soviet Union) Usov – 11	(Soviet Union) Markov
1977	2nd	20	38	6	10	22	40	76	22	R64	—	(Soviet Union) Dzagnidze – 9	(Soviet Union) Kalugin
1978	3rd, Group 4	6	46	20	12	14	64	50	52		—		
1979	3rd, Group 4	19	46	10	16	20	48	56	36		—		
1980	3rd, Group 2	10	34	12	11	11	37	27	35		—		
1981	3rd, Group 2	5	32	14	8	10	46	30	36		—		
1982	3rd, Group 2	2	32	19	8	5	51	28	46		—		
1983	3rd, Group 2	5	28	11	10	7	35	27	32		—		(Soviet Union) Kostylev
1984	3rd, Group 2	10	32	11	9	12	25	33	31		—		
1985	3rd, Group 2	7	28	13	4	11	34	32	30		—		
1986	3rd, Group 2	5	32	16	8	8	50	33	40		—		
1987	3rd, Group 2	5	32	15	8	9	44	29	38		—		
1988	3rd, Group 2	7	32	13	5	14	30	28	31		—	(Soviet Union) V. Popov – 7	(Soviet Union) Semyonov
1989	3rd, Group 2	12	42	18	4	20	42	41	40	R128	—	(Soviet Union) Gavrilov – 15	(Soviet Union) Navrozov
1990	4th, Group 7	3	32	18	10	4	48	15	46		—	(Soviet Union) O. Mironov – 13	(Soviet Union) Zolotukhin
1991	4th, Group 7	1	42	30	8	4	79	20	68		—	(Soviet Union) Gavrilov – 16 (Soviet Union) Surov – 16	(Soviet Union) Zolotukhin

=== Russia ===
Season	Div.	Pos.	Pl.	W	D	L	GS	GA	P	Cup	Europe		Top scorer (League)	Head Coach
1992	RFD (2nd), "Centre"	5	34	15	9	10	43	30	39	NP	—		(Russia) Mulashev – 18	(Russia) Ivchenko
1993	RFD (2nd), "Centre"	8	38	19	6	13	48	46	44	R256	—		(Russia) Tatarkin – 11	(Ukraine) Lukashenko (Russia) Zadikashvili
1994	RSD (3rd), "Centre"	15	32	6	4	22	15	65	16	R256	—		(Russia) Tatarkin – 5	(Russia) Zadikashvili
1995	RSD (3rd), "Centre"	17	40	12	6	22	32	56	42	R256	—		(Russia) Tatarkin – 8	(Russia) Zadikashvili
1996	RSD (3rd), "Centre"	6	42	24	7	11	66	34	79	R512	—		(Russia) Pantyushenko – 20	(Russia) Volchok
1997	RSD (3rd), "Centre"	1	40	32	6	2	88	22	102	R64	—		(Russia) Knyazev – 25	(Russia) Volchok
1998	RFD (2nd)	7	42	19	6	17	56	50	63	QF	—		(Russia) Kuzmichyov – 15	(Russia) Volchok (Russia) Irkhin
1999	RFD (2nd)	7	42	18	12	12	56	49	66	R64	—		(Russia) Nechaev – 10	(Russia) Sadyrin
2000	RFD (2nd)	3	38	24	6	8	61	28	78	R64	—		(Russia) Filippov – 12	(Russia) Antikhovich
2001	RFD (2nd)	8	34	13	7	14	44	44	46	R64	—		(Croatia) Ljubobratović – 9	(Russia) Antikhovich (Turkmenistan) Berdyev
2002	RFD (2nd)	1	34	22	6	6	51	14	72	R16	—		(Georgia (country)) Chaladze – 20	(Turkmenistan) Berdyev
2003	1st	3	30	15	8	7	44	29	53	R16	—		(Brazil) Roni – 11	(Turkmenistan) Berdyev
2004	1st	10	30	7	12	11	32	31	33	R16	UC	2nd Qual.R	(Brazil) Roni – 5	(Turkmenistan) Berdyev
2005	1st	4	30	14	9	7	45	31	51	R32	—		(Czech Republic) Čížek – 7	(Turkmenistan) Berdyev
2006	1st	5	30	13	7	10	43	37	46	R16	UC	1st Round	(Argentina) Domínguez – 13	(Turkmenistan) Berdyev
2007	1st	10	30	10	5	15	31	39	35	R16	IC	3rd Round	(Russia) Ryazantsev – 5	(Turkmenistan) Berdyev
2008	1st	1	30	18	6	6	44	26	60	R16	—		(Russia) Bukharov – 6 (Turkey) Gökdeniz – 6 (Ecuador) Noboa – 6	(Turkmenistan) Berdyev
2009	1st	1	30	19	6	5	62	21	63	RU	UCL; EL	Group Stg. R16	(Russia) Bukharov – 16 (Argentina) Domínguez – 16	(Turkmenistan) Berdyev
2010	1st	3	30	15	13	2	37	16	58	R32	UCL; EL	Group Stg. R32	(Ecuador) Noboa – 8	(Turkmenistan) Berdyev
2011–12	1st	6	44	17	17	10	55	41	68	W	UCL; EL	Play-off Rnd. R32	(Israel) Natcho – 9	(Turkmenistan) Berdyev
2012–13	1st	6	30	15	5	10	39	27	50	R32	EL	QF	(Israel) Natcho – 9	(Turkmenistan) Berdyev
2013–14	1st	9	30	9	11	10	36	30	38	R32	EL	R32	(Venezuela) Rondón – 6	(Turkmenistan) Berdyev (Russia) Maminov
2014–15	1st	5	30	13	9	8	39	33	48	QF	—		(Russia) Portnyagin – 11	(Russia) Bilyaletdinov
2015–16	1st	10	30	9	6	15	33	39	33	R32	EL	Group Stg.	(Ukraine) Dević – 7	(Ukraine) Chaly
2016–17	1st	9	30	10	8	12	30	34	38	SF	—		(Brazil) Jonathas – 9	(Spain) Gracia
2017–18	1st	10	30	9	11	10	32	25	38	R16	—		(Iran) Azmoun – 5	(Turkmenistan) Berdyev
2018–19	1st	11	30	7	15	8	24	30	36	QF	—		(Russia) Sorokin – 6	(Turkmenistan) Berdyev
2019–20	1st	10	30	8	11	11	18	28	35	R32	—		(Russia) Markov – 5	(Russia) Sharonov (Russia) Slutsky
2020–21	1st	4	30	16	5	9	42	33	53	Group stage	—		(Serbia) Despotović – 14	(Russia) Slutsky
2021–22	1st	15	30	8	5	17	34	56	29	Quarterfinal	UECL	3rd Qual.R	(Denmark) Dreyer – 8	(Russia) Slutsky
2022–23	2nd	1	33	19	11	3	53	27	68	Fourth Round	—			

== European cups history ==
Competition	Games	Wins	Draws	Losses	GS	GA	GD
UEFA Champions League	16	4	7	5	12	16	–4
UEFA Europa League	26	11	8	7	36	23	+13
UEFA Europa Conference League	2	0	1	1	0	1	–1
UEFA Cup	6	3	0	3	8	5	+3
UEFA Intertoto Cup	4	2	1	1	6	3	+3
Total	54	20	17	17	62	48	+14

As of May 2023, Rubin Kazan holds 244th place in the UEFA 5-year Club Ranking.

=== Seasons ===
Season	Competition	Round	Country	Club	Home	Away	Aggregate
2004–05	UEFA Cup	2nd Qual. Round	(Austria)	Rapid Wien	0–3	2–0	2–3
2006–07	UEFA Cup	2nd Qual. Round	(Belarus)	BATE Borisov	3–0	2–0	5–0
2006–07	UEFA Cup	1st Round	(Italy)	Parma	0–1	0–1	0–2
2007	UEFA Intertoto Cup	2nd Round	(Hungary)	ZTE	3–0	2–0	5–0
2007	UEFA Intertoto Cup	3rd Round	(Austria)	Rapid Wien	0–0	1–3	1–3
2009–10	UEFA Champions League	Group stage	(Ukraine)	Dynamo Kyiv	0–0	1–3	
2009–10	UEFA Champions League	Group stage	(Italy)	Internazionale	1–1	0–2	
2009–10	UEFA Champions League	Group stage	(Spain)	Barcelona	0–0	2–1	
2009–10	UEFA Europa League	Round of 32	(Israel)	Hapoel Tel Aviv	3–0	0–0	3–0
2009–10	UEFA Europa League	Round of 16	(Germany)	Wolfsburg	1–1	1–2 (aet)	2–3
2010–11	UEFA Champions League	Group stage	(Denmark)	Copenhagen	1–0	0–1	
2010–11	UEFA Champions League	Group stage	(Spain)	Barcelona	1–1	0–2	
2010–11	UEFA Champions League	Group stage	(Greece)	Panathinaikos	0–0	0–0	
2010–11	UEFA Europa League	Round of 32	(Netherlands)	Twente	0–2	2–2	2–4
2011–12	UEFA Champions League	3rd Qual. Round	(Ukraine)	Dynamo Kyiv	2–1	2–0	4–1
2011–12	UEFA Champions League	Play–Off Round	(France)	Lyon	1–1	1–3	2–4
2011–12	UEFA Europa League	Group stage (Group A)	(England)	Tottenham Hotspur	1–0	0–1	
2011–12	UEFA Europa League	Group stage (Group A)	(Greece)	PAOK	2–2	1–1	
2011–12	UEFA Europa League	Group stage (Group A)	(Republic of Ireland)	Shamrock Rovers	4–1	3–0	
2011–12	UEFA Europa League	Round of 32	(Greece)	Olympiacos	0–1	0–1	0–2
2012–13	UEFA Europa League	Group stage (Group H)	(Italy)	Internazionale	3–0	2–2	
2012–13	UEFA Europa League	Group stage (Group H)	(Serbia)	Partizan	2–0	1–1	
2012–13	UEFA Europa League	Group stage (Group H)	(Azerbaijan)	Neftchi Baku	1–0	1–0	
2012–13	UEFA Europa League	Round of 32	(Spain)	Atlético Madrid	0–1	2–0	2–1
2012–13	UEFA Europa League	Round of 16	(Spain)	Levante	2–0 (aet)	0–0	2–0
2012–13	UEFA Europa League	Quarter-Finals	(England)	Chelsea	3–2	1–3	4–5
2013–14	UEFA Europa League	2nd Qual. Round	(Serbia)	Jagodina	1–0	3–2	4–2
2013–14	UEFA Europa League	3rd Qual. Round	(Denmark)	Randers	2–0	2–1	4–1
2013–14	UEFA Europa League	Play-off Round	(Norway)	Molde	3–0	2–0	5–0
2013–14	UEFA Europa League	Group stage (Group D)	(England)	Wigan Athletic	1–0	1–1	
2013–14	UEFA Europa League	Group stage (Group D)	(Slovenia)	Maribor	1–1	5–2	
2013–14	UEFA Europa League	Group stage (Group D)	(Belgium)	Zulte Waregem	4–0	2–0	
2013–14	UEFA Europa League	Round of 32	(Spain)	Real Betis	0–2	1–1	1–3
2015–16	UEFA Europa League	3rd Qual. Round	(Austria)	Sturm Graz	1–1	3–2	4–3
2015–16	UEFA Europa League	Play-off round	(North Macedonia)	FK Rabotnički	1–0	1–1	2–1
2015–16	UEFA Europa League	Group stage (Group B)	(England)	Liverpool	0–1	1–1	
2015–16	UEFA Europa League	Group stage (Group B)	(France)	Bordeaux	0–0	2–2	
2015–16	UEFA Europa League	Group stage (Group B)	(Switzerland)	Sion	2–0	1–2	
2021–22	UEFA Europa Conference League	3rd Qual. Round	(Poland)	Raków Częstochowa	0–1 (aet)	0–0	0−1

- Q= Qualifying rounds
- PO= Play-off round

== Affiliated clubs ==
- (Iran) Tractor

== Notable players ==
Had international caps for their respective countries. Players whose name is listed in bold represented their countries while playing for Rubin.

USSR/Russia

- (Soviet Union) **Viktor Kolotov**
- (Russia) **Roman Adamov**
- (Russia) Ilzat Akhmetov
- (Russia) Diniyar Bilyaletdinov
- (Russia) **Denis Boyarintsev**
- (Russia) **Aleksandr Bukharov**
- (Russia) Taras Burlak
- (Russia) Pyotr Bystrov
- (Russia) (Soviet Union) Andrei Chernyshov
- (Russia) Valeri Chizhov
- (Russia) Alan Dzagoev
- (Russia) Soslan Dzhanayev
- (Russia) **Vladimir Granat**
- (Russia) Vladislav Ignatyev
- (Russia) Oleg Ivanov
- (Russia) **Ruslan Kambolov**
- (Russia) **Maksim Kanunnikov**
- (Russia) Konstantin Kuchayev
- (Russia) **Fyodor Kudryashov**
- (Russia) **Oleg Kuzmin**
- (Russia) Daler Kuzyayev
- (Russia) **Pavel Mogilevets**
- (Russia) **Elmir Nabiullin**
- (Russia) **Magomed Ozdoyev**
- (Russia) **Dmitry Poloz**
- (Russia) **Igor Portnyagin**
- (Russia) Aleksei Rebko
- (Russia) **Aleksandr Ryazantsev**
- (Russia) **Sergey Ryzhikov**
- (Russia) **Ilya Samoshnikov**
- (Russia) **Sergei Semak**
- (Russia) Dmitri Sennikov
- (Russia) **Roman Sharonov**
- (Russia) Oleg Shatov
- (Russia) Roman Shirokov
- (Russia) Anton Shvets
- (Russia) Igor Simutenkov
- (Russia) **Yegor Sorokin**
- (Russia) Dmitri Tarasov
- (Russia) Dmitri Torbinski
- (Russia) Dmitri Vasilyev
- (Russia) Rifat Zhemaletdinov

Europe

- (Albania) (Kosovo) **Mirlind Daku**
- (Albania) Nazmi Gripshi
- (Armenia) Khoren Bayramyan
- (Armenia) Sargis Hovhannisyan
- (Armenia) **Ugochukwu Iwu**
- (Armenia) **Vardan Khachatryan**
- (Armenia) Eduard Partsikyan
- (Austria) **Moritz Bauer**
- (Azerbaijan) **Ruslan Abışov**
- (Azerbaijan) Ramil Sheydayev
- (Belarus) **Sergey Kislyak**
- (Belarus) **Sergey Kornilenko**
- (Belarus) Andrei Kovalenko
- (Belarus) Vitaly Lisakovich
- (Belarus) Alyaksandr Martynovich
- (Belarus) **Mikalay Ryndzyuk**
- (Belgium) Cédric Roussel
- (Bulgaria) Blagoy Georgiev
- (Bulgaria) **Ivelin Popov**
- (Croatia) Mijo Caktaš
- (Croatia) Marko Livaja
- (Croatia) Stjepan Tomas
- (Croatia) **Filip Uremović**
- (Czech Republic) Jiří Novotný
- (Czech Republic) Adam Petrouš
- (Denmark) **Oliver Abildgaard**
- (Denmark) **Anders Dreyer**
- (Finland) **Alexei Eremenko**
- (Finland) **Roman Eremenko**
- (France) Yann M'Vila
- (Georgia (country)) **Mikheil Ashvetia**
- (Georgia (country)) **David Chaladze**
- (Georgia (country)) **Zuriko Davitashvili**
- (Georgia (country)) **Georgi Kinkladze**
- (Georgia (country)) Mamuka Kobakhidze
- (Georgia (country)) **Khvicha Kvaratskhelia**
- (Georgia (country)) **Dato Kvirkvelia**
- (Georgia (country)) **Solomon Kvirkvelia**
- (Georgia (country)) Beka Mikeltadze
- (Georgia (country)) **Nukri Revishvili**
- (Georgia (country)) **Lasha Salukvadze**
- (Georgia (country)) Levan Silagadze
- (Iceland) Viðar Örn Kjartansson
- (Iceland) **Ragnar Sigurðsson**
- (Italy) Salvatore Bocchetti
- (Kazakhstan) **Aleksei Popov**
- (Kosovo) **Veldin Hodža**
- (Latvia) **Vitālijs Astafjevs**
- (Latvia) Edgars Burlakovs
- (Latvia) **Aleksandrs Koliņko**
- (Latvia) **Mihails Ziziļevs**
- (Lithuania) **Giedrius Arlauskis**
- (Lithuania) Orestas Buitkus
- (Lithuania) Mindaugas Kalonas
- (Lithuania) **Saulius Mikalajūnas**
- (Moldova) **Alexandru Antoniuc**
- (Moldova) Ilie Cebanu
- (Moldova) Valeriu Ciupercă
- (Moldova) **Alexandru Gaţcan**
- (Montenegro) **Sead Hakšabanović**
- (Montenegro) **Igor Vujačić**
- (Poland) **Rafał Murawski**
- (Poland) Maciej Rybus
- (Romania) Gabriel Enache
- (Serbia and Montenegro) Veljko Paunović
- (Serbia) (Serbia and Montenegro) **Savo Milošević**
- (Serbia) Lazar Ranđelović
- (Spain) Pablo Orbaiz
- (Sweden) **Emil Bergström**
- (Sweden) **Carl Starfelt**
- (Turkey) **Hasan Kabze**
- (Turkey) **Gökdeniz Karadeniz**
- (Turkey) Fatih Tekke
- (Turkey) **Gökhan Töre**
- (Ukraine) Marko Dević
- (Ukraine) Oleksandr Hranovsky
- (Ukraine) Andriy Pylyavskyi
- (Ukraine) Serhii Rebrov
- (Ukraine) Oleksandr Svystunov

South and Central America

- (Argentina) **Cristian Ansaldi**
- (Brazil) **Carlos Eduardo**
- (Brazil) Roni
- (Chile) **Ignacio Saavedra**
- (Ecuador) Walter Chalá
- (Ecuador) **Christian Noboa**
- (Jamaica) **Damani Ralph**
- (Honduras) **Denil Maldonado**
- (Paraguay) **Nelson Valdez**
- (Peru) Carlos Zambrano
- (Uruguay) Mauricio Lemos
- (Uruguay) **Andrés Scotti**
- (Venezuela) **Salomón Rondón**

Africa

- (Cameroon) Alex Song
- (Democratic Republic of the Congo) Chris Mavinga
- (Ghana) Joel Fameyeh
- (Ghana) **Wakaso Mubarak**
- (The Gambia) **Ebrima Ebou Sillah**
- (Morocco) **Abdelkarim Kissi**
- (Nigeria) **Obafemi Martins**
- (South Africa) **MacBeth Sibaya**
- (Tunisia) **Selim Ben Achour**
- (Tunisia) **Montassar Talbi**

Asia

- (Iran) **Sardar Azmoun**
- (Iran) **Alireza Haghighi**
- (South Korea) **Kim Dong-hyun**
- (South Korea) **Hwang In-beom**
- (Syria) **Anas Makhlouf**
- (Tajikistan) Alisher Dzhalilov
- (Tajikistan) Parvizdzhon Umarbayev
- (Turkmenistan) **Nazar Baýramow**
- (Turkmenistan) **Wladimir Baýramow**
- (Turkmenistan) **Pavel Kharchik**
- (Turkmenistan) Wahyt Orazsähedow
- (Israel) **Bibras Natcho**
- (Uzbekistan) **Rustam Ashurmatov**
- (Uzbekistan) **Marat Bikmaev**
- (Uzbekistan) Fevzi Davletov
- (Uzbekistan) Vitaliy Denisov
- (Uzbekistan) **Andrei Fyodorov**
- (Uzbekistan) **Vagiz Galiulin**
- (Uzbekistan) **Bahodir Nasimov**

== Fans ==
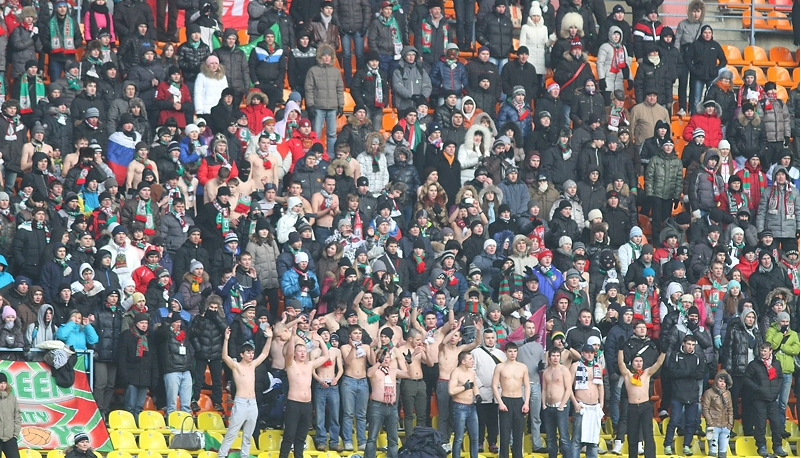
Fans Rubin winter in Moscow

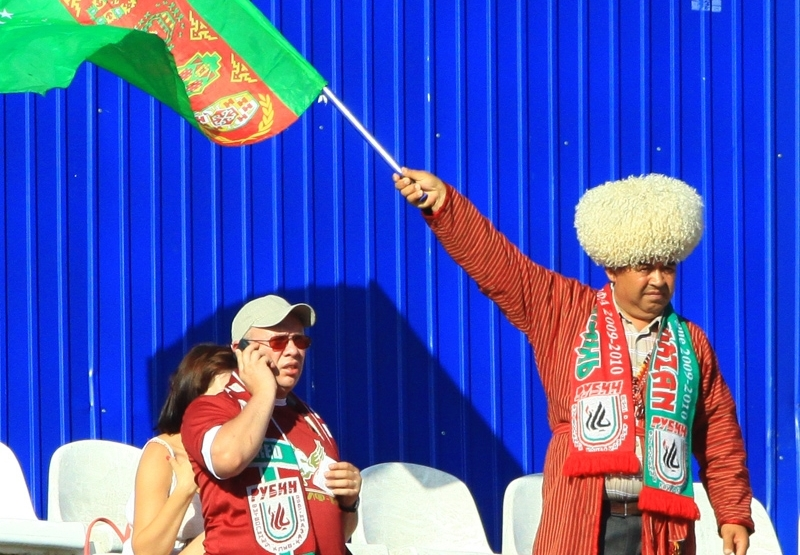
Supporter from Turkmenistan

Rubin – one of the most popular football clubs in the country. Official group of fans called "Rubin Ultras". "Rubin Ultras" – a few thousand fans behind the goal that all match continuously support the team.

Rubin is popular in the former Soviet Union and Central Asia. The club there are official fan clubs in Russian cities.

In August 2013, after the change of logo, fans of the club have publicly expressed their anger. Since then, at the games are often calls for the dismissal of the club's management. On the Internet, fans are still using the old logo, which appeared in 1996. Also boycott attributes with a new logo. The phrase "Save the logo – to keep the tradition" and "Against Modern Football" is most often used by Kazan fans.

=== Notable supporters ===
- Rustam Minnikhanov – is a Tatar politician and the second and current President of Tatarstan, a federal subject of Russia
- Mintimer Shaimiev – was the first President of Tatarstan, a republic within Russia
- Gurbanguly Berdimuhamedow – has served as the President of Turkmenistan since 21 December 2006
- Kamil Iskhakov – is currently Russian regional development minister's assistant
- Yanina Batyrchina – is a former Individual Rhythmic Gymnast
- Zinetula Bilyaletdinov – is a former Russian ice hockey player and coach of the Russian national ice hockey team
- Vladimir Chagin – is a Russian rally raid driver
- MakSim – is a successful Russian-speaking singer
- Irina Shadrina – TV presenter in Rossiya 2
- Dina Garipova – Russian singer. A participant of Eurovision 2013

== Rivalries ==
Historically, Rubin has 3 strong rivalries accompanied with fans conflicts:

- against Krylia Sovetov club from neighbouring city of Samara

Rivalry is called "Volga Derby".

- against KAMAZ club, based in Naberezhnye Chelny, Tatarstan

Rivalry is called "Tatarstan Derby".

- against Amkar club from neighbouring city of Perm

== Stadium ==
The main home ground of Rubin is Kazan Arena, which has a capacity of 45,000. The stadium is situated in Kazan. The home ground of the youth squad is Rubin Stadium (capacity 10,000), which is situated on the north of the city.

== Average attendance ==
Year	Reg. season
2011	16,380
2010	13,077
2009	14,719
2008	18,053
2007	11,633
2006	13,380
2005	11,800
