= 2011 FC Kairat season =

FC Kairat
2011 season
- Chairman: Kairat Boranbayev
- Manager: Vladimir Nikitenko (until 11 June); John Gregory (from 15 June)
- Stadium: Central Stadium
- Kazakhstan Premier League: 11th
- Kazakhstan Cup: Quarterfinal Round vs Tobol
Home colours	Away colours	Third colours

The 2011 FC Kairat season was the club's 2nd season back in the Kazakhstan Premier League, the highest tier of association football in Kazakhstan, since their promotion back to the top flight in 2009. Kairat finished the season in 11th place and reached the Quarterfinal of the Kazakhstan Cup.

== Squad ==
As of match played 29 October 2011

No.	Name	Nationality	Position	Date of birth (age)	Signed from	Signed in	Apps.	Goals
Goalkeepers
1	Daniil Rikhard	(Kazakhstan)	GK	27 February 1974 (aged 37)	Okzhetpes	2011	23	0
30	Andrey Tsvetkov	(Kazakhstan)	GK	20 March 1980 (aged 31)	Zhetysu	2011	8	0
36	Nuriddin Raimov	(Kazakhstan)	GK	20 May 1990 (aged 21)	Academy			
54	Yossi Shekel	(Israel)	GK	24 September 1984 (aged 27)	Ashdod	2011	4	0
70	Rauan Atantaev	(Kazakhstan)	GK	8 July 1988 (aged 23)	Academy			
Defenders
2	Almas Baseenov	(Kazakhstan)	DF	9 April 1990 (aged 21)	Academy			
3	Farhadbek Imamov	(Kazakhstan)	DF	15 March 1990 (aged 21)	Academy			
4	Ilya Vorotnikov	(Kazakhstan)	DF	1 February 1986 (aged 25)	Atyrau	2011	25	0
5	Pavel Kirylchyk	(Belarus)	DF	4 January 1981 (aged 30)	Minsk	2011	30	0
14	Nursayn Zholdasov	(Kazakhstan)	DF	11 May 1991 (aged 20)	Ordabasy	2011	6	0
16	Yevgeni Goryachi	(Kazakhstan)	DF	2 February 1991 (aged 20)	Shakhter Karagandy	2011	29	0
25	Madiyar Muminov	(Kazakhstan)	DF	18 October 1980 (aged 31)		2010		
26	Marko Đorđević	(Serbia)	DF	22 May 1983 (aged 28)	Jagodina	2011	23	1
33	Kirill Morunov	(Kazakhstan)	DF	13 July 1990 (aged 21)	Academy			
35	Aibek Nurgaliev	(Kazakhstan)	DF	19 April 1993 (aged 18)	Academy			
41	Yerkebulan Dauletshin	(Kazakhstan)	DF	21 August 1992 (aged 19)	Academy			
44	Yevgeni Klimov	(Kazakhstan)	DF	21 January 1985 (aged 26)	Vostok	2011	19	0
50	Alikhan Shabdenov	(Kazakhstan)	DF	19 June 1994 (aged 17)	Academy			
55	Maksat Kusherbaev	(Kazakhstan)	DF	14 May 1990 (aged 21)	Academy			
Midfielders
6	Rakhimzhan Rozybakiyev	(Kazakhstan)	MF	2 January 1991 (aged 20)	Academy	2009		
10	Ruslan Baltiev	(Kazakhstan)	MF	16 September 1978 (aged 33)	Zhemchuzhina-Sochi	2011	21	2
11	Chingiz Abugaliyev	(Kazakhstan)	MF	11 October 1986 (aged 25)	Zhetysu	2009		
12	Bekzhan Alipbekov	(Kazakhstan)	MF	17 May 1990 (aged 21)	Academy			
13	Ruslanzhan Raimbakiyev	(Kazakhstan)	MF	26 July 1990 (aged 21)	Academy			
15	Zhastalap Tlegenov	(Kazakhstan)	MF	17 December 1992 (aged 18)	Academy			
17	Konstantin Golovskoy	(Russia)	MF	25 April 1975 (aged 36)	Aktobe	2011	32	10
21	Arman Khalikov	(Kazakhstan)	MF	1 March 1990 (aged 21)	Academy			
22	Kirill Shestakov	(Kazakhstan)	MF	19 June 1985 (aged 26)	Vostok	2011	30	0
24	Aslan Orazayev	(Kazakhstan)	MF	7 May 1992 (aged 19)	Academy			
37	Timur Burzakov	(Kazakhstan)	MF	10 May 1992 (aged 19)	Academy			
40	Nursultan Nusupov	(Kazakhstan)	MF	15 February 1990 (aged 21)	Academy			
68	Rinat Khasenov	(Kazakhstan)	MF	8 May 1987 (aged 24)	Tobol	2011	7	0
69	Bekzat Uzenov	(Kazakhstan)	MF	23 May 1991 (aged 20)	Academy			
77	Stéphane Kingué Mpondo	(Cameroon)	MF	2 June 1985 (aged 26)	Ashdod	2011	12	0
84	Alexey Shakin	(Kazakhstan)	MF	6 August 1984 (aged 27)	Irtysh Pavlodar			
88	Aset Nysanov	(Kazakhstan)	MF	30 August 1992 (aged 19)	Academy			
	Kanat Bolatov	(Kazakhstan)	MF	28 January 1990 (aged 21)	Academy			
	Yerlan Turashbaev	(Kazakhstan)	MF	16 September 1991 (aged 20)	Academy			
Forwards
7	Artyom Fomin	(Russia)	FW	22 September 1990 (aged 21)	Spartak Moscow	2010		
8	Valery Miller	(Kazakhstan)	FW	8 November 1990 (aged 20)	Academy			
9	Murat Suyumagambetov	(Kazakhstan)	FW	14 October 1983 (aged 28)	Tobol	2011	32	3
18	Deyan Hristov	(Bulgaria)	FW	28 February 1983 (aged 28)	Sliven	2011	22	4
19	Ruslan Mansurov	(Kazakhstan)	FW	23 November 1990 (aged 20)	Sunkar	2010		
27	Sergei Strukov	(Russia)	FW	17 September 1982 (aged 29)	Avangard Kursk	2011	19	6
32	Wladimir Baýramow	(Turkmenistan)	FW	2 August 1980 (aged 31)		2011	14	2
34	Arman Masimzhanov	(Kazakhstan)	FW	6 January 1991 (aged 20)	Academy			
92	Galym Raykhanov	(Kazakhstan)	FW	22 July 1992 (aged 19)	Academy			
Players away on loan
Players that left during the season

== Transfers ==
=== Winter ===
In: Note: Flags indicate national team as defined under FIFA eligibility rules; some limited exceptions apply. Players may hold more than one non-FIFA nationality.

No.	Pos.	Nation	Player
5	MF	BLR	Pavel Kirylchyk (from (Belarus) Minsk)
17	DF	KAZ	Konstantin Golovskoy (from (Kazakhstan) Aktobe)
18	FW	BUL	Deyan Hristov (from (Bulgaria) Sliven)
26	DF	SRB	Marko Đorđević (from (Serbia) Jagodina)
27	FW	RUS	Sergei Strukov (from (Russia) Avangard Kursk)
32	FW	TKM	Wladimir Baýramow

Out: Note: Flags indicate national team as defined under FIFA eligibility rules; some limited exceptions apply. Players may hold more than one non-FIFA nationality.

No.	Pos.	Nation	Player
1	GK	SRB	Nenad Erić (to (Kazakhstan) Astana)
8	MF	KAZ	Sabyrkhan Ibraev (from (Kazakhstan) Kaisar)
10	FW	SRB	Dragan Đorđević
17	DF	RUS	Yevgeni Ovshinov (from (Kazakhstan) Tobol)
19	DF	SRB	Bojan Trkulja (to (Kazakhstan) Atyrau)
20	DF	KGZ	Sergey Kutsov (to (Kazakhstan) Atyrau)
47	MF	KAZ	Andrei Bogomolov (from (Kazakhstan) Sunkar)
81	FW	SRB	Dragan Gošić (to (Hungary) Szolnoki MÁV)

=== Summer ===
In: Note: Flags indicate national team as defined under FIFA eligibility rules; some limited exceptions apply. Players may hold more than one non-FIFA nationality.

No.	Pos.	Nation	Player
54	GK	ISR	Yossi Shekel (from (Israel) Ashdod)
77	MF	CMR	Stéphane Kingué (from (Israel) Ashdod)
99	MF	GEO	Shevec Movtyanishvili

Out: Note: Flags indicate national team as defined under FIFA eligibility rules; some limited exceptions apply. Players may hold more than one non-FIFA nationality.

No.	Pos.	Nation	Player

== Competitions ==
=== Kazakhstan Premier League ===
==== Regular season ====
===== Results summary =====
Overall								Home						Away					
Pld	W	D	L	GF	GA	GD	Pts	W	D	L	GF	GA	GD	W	D	L	GF	GA	GD
0	0	0	0	0	0	0	0	0	0	0	0	0	0	0	0	0	0	0	0

Last updated: 2 October 2015.
Source: See Results

===== Results by round =====
Round	1	2	3	4	5	6	7	8	9	10	11	12	13	14	15	16	17	18	19	20	21	22	23	24	25	26
Ground																										
Result																										
Position																										

Source: See Results
A = Away; H = Home; W = Win; D = Draw; L = Loss

===== Results =====
6 March 2011 1	Vostok	1 – 0	Kairat	Oskemen
15:00 (UTC+6)	Dobrić (yellow card) 10' (goal) 40'; V.Sedelnikov (yellow card) 81'	Report	N.Zholdasov (yellow card) 67'	Stadium: Vostok Stadium; Attendance: 1,300; Referee: Viktor Antonov

12 March 2011 2	Zhetysu	0 – 1	Kairat	Taldykorgan
16:200 (UTC+6)	Kumisbekov (yellow card) 84'; Muzhikov (yellow card) 90'	Report	Baýramow 17'; Kirylchyk (yellow card) 23'; Klimov (yellow card) 81'	Stadium: Zhetysu Stadium; Attendance: 2,500; Referee: Akmalkhan Kholmatov

17 March 2011 3	Kairat	0 – 0	Kaisar	Almaty
17:00 (UTC+6)	N.Zholdasov (yellow card) 29'; Shestakov (yellow card) 35'	Report	Ibraev (yellow card) 35'; Edeipo (yellow card) 76'	Stadium: Central Stadium; Attendance: 4,800; Referee: Igor Aleshin

31 March 2011 4	Atyrau	2 – 2	Kairat	Atyrau
18:00 (UTC+6)	Travin (yellow card) 25'; S.Shaff 34' (pen.); V.Chureev 53'; Jonathas (yellow card) 68'	Report	Strukov 30' (yellow card) 52'; Golovskoy 68' (yellow card) 90+2' (yellow-red card) 90+3'; Baltiev (yellow card) 71'	Stadium: Munaishy Stadium; Attendance: 8,500; Referee: Gennadiy Zhukovskiy

4 April 2011 5	Kairat	1 – 3	Irtysh Pavlodar	Almaty
17:00 (UTC+6)	Baltiev 51'; M.Muminov (yellow card) 61'; Kirylchyk (yellow card) 79'; Fomin (yellow card) 88'	Report	Doroș 33'; Ivanov 73'; Maltsev (yellow card) 87' (goal) 90'	Stadium: Central Stadium; Attendance: 2,500; Referee: Pavel Saliy

9 April 2011 6	Tobol	3 – 1	Kairat	Kostanay
15:00 (UTC+6)	Yurin 34', 89'; Sheptytskyi 41'	Report	Golovskoy 10' (pen.); Baýramow (yellow card) 59'; Klimov (yellow card) 71'; M.Muminov (yellow card) 71'	Stadium: Stadion Zatobolets; Attendance: 3,800; Referee: Bolat Karlibayev

16 April 2011 7	Kairat	2 – 3	Astana	Almaty
17:00 (UTC+6)	Đorđević (yellow card) 29' (yellow-red card) 32'; Nusserbayev 56' (o.g.); E.Kostrub 72'	Report	Zhumaskaliyev 18' (yellow card) 90'; Nusserbayev 40'; Aliev (yellow card) 55'; Bogavac 80'; Rozhkov (red card) 90'	Stadium: Central Stadium; Attendance: 2,000; Referee: Ruslan Duzmambetov

24 April 2011 8	Ordabasy	2 – 0	Kairat	Shymkent
17:00 (UTC+6)	Kasyanov 22'; Yevstigneyev (yellow card) 58'; Tazhimbetov 85'	Report	M.Muminov (yellow card) 76'	Stadium: Kazhymukan Munaitpasov Stadium; Attendance: 4,000; Referee: Artyom Kuchin

30 April 2011 9	Kairat	1 – 0	Taraz	Almaty
17:30 (UTC+6)	Shestakov (yellow card) 31'; Suyumagambetov (yellow card) 41'; Vorotnikov (yellow card) 42'; Hristov 79'	Report	Sobolev (yellow card) 21'; Diakate (yellow card) 55'; D.Yevstigneyev (yellow card) 70'	Stadium: Central Stadium; Attendance: 3,500; Referee: Aleksei Bobrov

7 May 2011 10	Aktobe	3 – 0	Kairat	Aktobe
18:00 (UTC+6)	Mané 21', 29', 39'	Report	Y.Kostrub (yellow card) 49'	Stadium: №8 Odyushor Stadium; Attendance: 3,000; Referee: Akmalkhan Kholmatov

15 May 2011 11	Kairat	2 – 1	Shakhter Karagandy	Almaty
18:00 (UTC+6)	Shestakov (yellow card) 34'; Golovskoy 49' (yellow card) 70'; Strukov 82'	Report	Rašković 22'; Utabayev (yellow card) 52'; A.Borantaev (yellow card) 66'	Stadium: Central Stadium; Attendance: 1,500; Referee: Aleksandr Gauzer

21 May 2011 12	Shakhter Karagandy	4 – 2	Kairat	Karaganda
18:30 (UTC+6)	Baizhanov (yellow card) 3'; Khizhnichenko 8' (yellow card) 37'; Kukeyev 12' (pen.), 31' (pen.); Zhangylyshbay 90'; Soloshenko (yellow card) 90'	Report	Y.Goriachiy (yellow card) 6'; M.Muminov (yellow card) 8' (yellow-red card) 34'; Strukov 18'; Klimov (yellow card) 50'; Đorđević 90'	Stadium: Shakhter Stadium; Attendance: 5,000; Referee: Viktor Antonov

26 May 2011 13	Kairat	3 – 0	Aktobe	Almaty
18:00 (UTC+6)	Golovskoy 14'; A.Tsvetkov (yellow card) 45'; Shestakov (yellow card) 60'; Strukov 68'; Suyumagambetov 80'	Report	Logvinenko (yellow card) 77'	Stadium: Central Stadium; Attendance: 3,500; Referee: Oleg Sokolov

8 June 2011 14	Taraz	1 – 0	Kairat	Taraz
18:00 (UTC+6)	Diakate 30'; Pakholyuk (yellow card) 81'; Islamkhan (yellow card) 84'; A.Ersalimov (yellow card) 88'	Report	Đorđević (yellow card) 47'; C.Abugaliyev (yellow card) 56'; Y.Goryachi (yellow card) 63'	Stadium: Central Stadium; Attendance: 2,500; Referee: Ruslan Duzmambetov

12 June 2011 15	Kairat	0 – 3	Ordabasy	Almaty
18:30 (UTC+6)	Shestakov (yellow card) 77'	Report	Yevstigneyev (yellow card) 8'; Irismetov (yellow card) 25'; Ashirbekov (yellow card) 52'; Tazhimbetov 65', 83'; Perić 74'	Stadium: Central Stadium; Attendance: 3,500; Referee: Askhat Abdanbayev

19 June 2011 16	Astana	6 – 1	Kairat	Astana
17:00 (UTC+6)	Bugaiov 3', 55' (pen.); Bogavac 22'; Gorman 35'; Konysbayev 74'; Zhumaskaliyev 81'	Report	Y.Goriachiy (yellow card) 36'; A.Tsvetkov (yellow card) 54'; Klimov (yellow card) 68'; Strukov 90+2'	Stadium: Astana Arena; Attendance: 5,000; Referee: Aleksandr Gauzer

25 June 2011 17	Kairat	0 – 0	Tobol	Almaty
18:30 (UTC+6)		Report		Stadium: Central Stadium; Attendance: 4,750; Referee: Artyom Kuchin

3 July 2011 18	Irtysh Pavlodar	1 – 1	Kairat	Pavlodar
19:00 (UTC+6)	Ivanov (yellow card) 43'; Govedarica 59'; Akhmetov (yellow card) 65'	Report	Golovskoy 43' (pen.) (yellow card) 64'; C.Abugaliyev (yellow card) 52' (yellow-red card) 60'; Vorotnikov (yellow card) 52'	Stadium: Central Stadium; Attendance: 4,000; Referee: Marat Iskakov

9 July 2011 19	Kairat	2 – 0	Atyrau	Almaty
19:00 (UTC+6)	Klimov (yellow card) 33'; Suyumagambetov 40' (yellow card) 75'; Hristov 42'; Vorotnikov (yellow card) 78'	Report	Leon (yellow card) 65'; Bechan (yellow card) 66'; Rodionov (yellow card) 85'	Stadium: Central Stadium; Attendance: 2,000; Referee: Bolat Karlibayev

16 July 2011 20	Kaisar	2 – 0	Kairat	Kyzylorda
19:00 (UTC+6)	Perić 13'; Tagybergen (yellow card) 31'; Ibraev (yellow card) 42'; Edeipo (yellow card) 60'; V.Goloveshkin 70'; A.Anarmetov (yellow card) 83'; R.Esatov (yellow card) 84'	Report	C.Abugaliyev (yellow card) 35' (yellow-red card) 83'	Stadium: Gani Muratbayev Stadium; Attendance: 4,000; Referee: Aleksei Bobrov

23 July 2011 21	Kairat	0 – 1	Zhetysu	Almaty
18:30 (UTC+6)	Klimov (yellow card) 52'; Vorotnikov (yellow card) 76'	Report	Z.Korobov (yellow card) 8'; Klimavičius 29'; Kumisbekov (yellow card) 90+3'	Stadium: Central Stadium; Attendance: 2,000; Referee: Igor Aleshin

30 July 2011 22	Kairat	1 – 1	Vostok	Almaty
19:00 (UTC+6)	C.Abugaliyev (yellow card) 51'; Baltiev 85'	Report	Khizaneishvili 78' (pen.)	Stadium: Central Stadium; Attendance: 3,000; Referee: Anatolyi Vishnichenko

===== League table =====
Pos	Team	Pld	W	D	L	GF	GA	GD	Pts	Qualification
7	Tobol	22	8	3	11	30	28	+2	27	Qualification for the relegation group
8	Taraz	22	6	3	13	15	24	−9	21	Qualification for the relegation group
9	Kairat	22	5	5	12	20	37	−17	20	Qualification for the relegation group
10	Atyrau	22	4	8	10	15	30	−15	20	Qualification for the relegation group
11	Vostok	22	3	9	10	15	32	−17	18	Qualification for the relegation group

Source: kff.kz (in Russian)
Rules for classification: 1st points; 2nd overall wins; 3rd goal difference; 4th goals scored. The winners of the 2011 Kazakhstan Cup competition will qualify for the second qualifying round of the UEFA Europa League.

==== Relegation Round ====
===== Results =====
14 August 2011 23	Taraz	2 – 1	Kairat	Taraz
18:30 (UTC+6)	Adamović 23' (pen.); D.Yevstigneyev (yellow card) 32'; O.Nedashkovsky 69'	Report	Mpondo (yellow card) 33'; Fomin 35'; Shestakov (yellow card) 38'	Stadium: Central Stadium; Attendance: 3,200; Referee: Viktor Antonov

20 August 2011 24	Kairat	1 – 1	Atyrau	Almaty
19:00 (UTC+6)	Mpondo (yellow card) 38'; Golovskoy 90'	Report	V.Sedelnikov 7'; Travin (yellow card) 38'; Leon (yellow card) 70'; Nivaldo (yellow card) 90'	Stadium: Central Stadium; Attendance: 1,500; Referee: Igor Khisamutdinov

25 August 2011 25	Kaisar	2 – 0	Kairat	Kyzylorda
18:00 (UTC+6)	R.Esatov (yellow card) 8'; Perić 10'; Edeipo 78'	Report	Klimov (yellow card) 3'; Shestakov (yellow card) 50'	Stadium: Gani Muratbayev Stadium; Attendance: 2,500; Referee: Oleg Sokolov

10 September 2011 26	Vostok	0 – 0	Kairat	Oskemen
17:00 (UTC+6)	Larin (yellow card) 84'	Report	Đorđević (yellow card) 64'	Stadium: Vostok Stadium; Attendance: 1,300; Referee: Igor Aleshin

17 September 2011 27	Kairat	3 – 0	Tobol	Almaty
18:00 (UTC+6)	Shestakov (yellow card) 27'; A.Shakin 47', 70'; Đorđević (yellow card) 51'; Golovskoy 67'	Report	Šljivić (yellow card) 39'; Dzholchiyev (yellow card) 73'	Stadium: Central Stadium; Attendance: 3,000; Referee: Aleksandr Gauzer

24 September 2011 28	Atyrau	3 – 0	Kairat	Atyrau
18:00 (UTC+6)	Trkulja (yellow card) 24'; S.Shaff 74'; V.Chureyev 85' (pen.); Rodionov 90+4'	Report		Stadium: Munaishy Stadium; Attendance: 4,000; Referee: Igor Aleshin

30 September 2011 29	Kairat	2 – 0	Kaisar	Almaty
19:00 (UTC+6)	Golovskoy 29'; Suyumagambetov 58'; Y.Kostrub (yellow card) 81'	Report	Semler (yellow card) 51'; A.Stakhiv (yellow card) 78'; M.Baizhanov (yellow card) 87'	Stadium: Central Stadium; Attendance: 1,000; Referee: Marat Iskakov

15 October 2011 30	Kairat	2 – 1	Vostok	Almaty
18:00 (UTC+6)	A.Shakin 8'; Shestakov (yellow card) 17' (yellow-red card) 90+1'; Golovskoy 23'; Đorđević (yellow card) 60'; Vorotnikov (yellow card) 89'	Report	R.Kismetov (yellow card) 18'; Abdulin (yellow card) 50'; P.Udalov 77'	Stadium: Central Stadium; Attendance: 1,000; Referee: Igor Khisamutdinov

22 October 2011 31	Tobol	2 – 0	Kairat	Kostanay
15:00 (UTC+6)	Kislitsyn 42'; Zebelyan 84'	Report	Y.Goryachi (yellow card) 22'; Mpondo (yellow card) 57' (yellow-red card) 70'	Stadium: Central Stadium; Attendance: 2,500; Referee: Gennadiy Zhukovskiy

29 October 2011 32	Kairat	1 – 1	Taraz	Almaty
15:00 (UTC+6)	Kirylchyk (yellow card) 42'; Golovskoy (yellow card) 83' (goal) 90' (pen.); R.Rozybakiyev (yellow card) 85'	Report	Kurgulin (yellow card) 20'; O.Nedashkovsky 57'; Sobolev (yellow card) 85'; R.Nurmukhametov (yellow card) 90+2'; Adamović (yellow card) 90+4'	Stadium: Central Stadium; Attendance: 1,500

===== Table =====
Pos	Team	Pld	W	D	L	GF	GA	GD	Pts	Qualification or relegation
8	Kaisar	32	10	5	17	29	53	−24	27	
9	Taraz	32	10	5	17	30	39	−9	25	
10	Atyrau	32	8	10	14	28	43	−15	24	
11	Kairat	32	8	8	16	30	49	−19	22	
12	Vostok (R)	32	5	11	16	23	47	−24	17	Relegation to the Kazakhstan First Division

Source: kff.kz (in Russian)
Rules for classification: 1st points; 2nd overall wins; 3rd goal difference; 4th goals scored.
(R) Relegated

=== Kazakhstan Cup ===
13 April 2011 First Round	Tsesna	0 – 5	Kairat	Almaty
(UTC+6)	V.Vyatkin (yellow card) 21'	Report	Baýramow 4'; Fomin 9'; Hristov 29', 45'; Strukov 50'	Stadium: Central Stadium; Attendance: 2,5000; Referee: Kholmatov

20 April 2011 Second Round	Astana	1 – 1 (a.e.t.) (2 – 4 p)	Kairat	Astana
18:30 (UTC+6)	Bugaiov 89'; Bogavac (yellow card) 115'	Summary; Report	Vorotnikov (yellow card) 18'; Fomin 75'; Shestakov (yellow card) 119'	Stadium: Astana Arena; Attendance: 2,500; Referee: Anatolyi Vishnichenko
	Penalties
	Aliev (penalty missed); Rozhkov (penalty missed); Bugaiov (penalty scored); Shakhmetov (penalty scored)		Baltiev (penalty missed); Strukov (penalty scored); Kirylchyk (penalty scored); Y.Kostrub (penalty scored); Golovskoy (penalty scored)

11 May 2011 Quarterfinal	Tobol	1 – 0	Kairat	Kostanay
19:00 (UTC+6)	Gridin 51'	Summary; Report	Đorđević (yellow card) 54'	Stadium: Central Stadium; Attendance: 6,000; Referee: Igor Khisamutdinov

== Squad statistics ==
As of Match played 29 October 2011

=== Appearances and goals ===
No.	Pos	Nat	Player	Total		Premier League		Kazakhstan Cup	
No.	Pos	Nat	Player	Apps	Goals	Apps	Goals	Apps	Goals
1	GK	(Kazakhstan) KAZ	Daniil Rikhard	23	0	21	0	2	0
4	DF	(Kazakhstan) KAZ	Ilya Vorotnikov	25	0	21+1	0	3	0
5	DF	(Belarus) BLR	Pavel Kirylchyk	30	0	26+1	0	1+2	0
6	MF	(Kazakhstan) KAZ	Rakhimzhan Rozybakiyev	3	0	2+1	0	0	0
7	FW	(Russia) RUS	Artyom Fomin	24	3	14+8	1	2	2
9	FW	(Kazakhstan) KAZ	Murat Suyumagambetov	32	3	22+7	3	3	0
10	MF	(Kazakhstan) KAZ	Ruslan Baltiev	21	2	15+4	2	1+1	0
11	MF	(Kazakhstan) KAZ	Chingiz Abugaliyev	18	0	10+7	0	1	0
14	DF	(Kazakhstan) KAZ	Nursayn Zholdasov	6	0	5+1	0	0	0
16	DF	(Kazakhstan) KAZ	Yevgeni Goryachi	29	0	25+1	0	2+1	0
17	MF	(Russia) RUS	Konstantin Golovskoy	32	10	26+3	10	0+3	0
18	FW	(Bulgaria) BUL	Deyan Hristov	22	4	14+6	2	2	2
19	FW	(Kazakhstan) KAZ	Ruslan Mansurov	7	0	2+5	0	0	0
21	MF	(Kazakhstan) KAZ	Arman Khalikov	11	0	2+8	0	1	0
22	MF	(Kazakhstan) KAZ	Kirill Shestakov	30	0	25+3	0	1+1	0
23	MF	(Kazakhstan) KAZ	Yevgeny Kostrub	30	1	25+2	1	3	0
25	DF	(Kazakhstan) KAZ	Madiyar Muminov	14	0	9+2	0	3	0
26	DF	(Serbia) SRB	Marko Đorđević	23	1	20+1	1	2	0
27	FW	(Kazakhstan) KAZ	Sergei Strukov	19	6	12+4	5	2+1	1
30	GK	(Kazakhstan) KAZ	Andrey Tsvetkov	8	0	7	0	1	0
32	FW	(Turkmenistan) TKM	Wladimir Baýramow	14	2	10+2	1	2	1
44	DF	(Kazakhstan) KAZ	Yevgeni Klimov	19	0	10+8	0	1	0
54	GK	(Israel) ISR	Yossi Shekel	4	0	4	0	0	0
68	MF	(Kazakhstan) KAZ	Rinat Khasenov	7	0	7	0	0	0
77	MF	(Cameroon) CMR	Stéphane Kingué Mpondo	12	0	11+1	0	0	0
84	MF	(Kazakhstan) KAZ	Alexey Shakin	11	3	7+4	3	0	0
92	FW	(Kazakhstan) KAZ	Galym Raykhanov	1	0	0+1	0	0	0
Players away from Kairat on loan:
Players who appeared for Kairat that left during the season:

=== Goal scorers ===
Place	Position	Nation	Number	Name	Premier League	Kazakhstan Cup	Total
1	MF	(Russia)	17	Konstantin Golovskoy	10	0	10
2	FW	(Russia)	27	Sergei Strukov	5	1	6
3	FW	(Bulgaria)	18	Deyan Hristov	2	2	4
4	MF	(Kazakhstan)	84	Alexey Shakin	3	0	3
4	FW	(Kazakhstan)	9	Murat Suyumagambetov	3	0	3
4	FW	(Russia)	7	Artyom Fomin	1	2	3
7	MF	(Kazakhstan)	10	Ruslan Baltiev	2	0	2
7	FW	(Turkmenistan)	32	Wladimir Baýramow	1	1	2
9	MF	(Kazakhstan)	23	Yevgeny Kostrub	1	0	1
9	DF	(Serbia)	26	Marko Đorđević	1	0	1
9				Own goal	1	0	1
				TOTALS	30	6	36

=== Disciplinary record ===
Number	Nation	Position	Name	Premier League		Kazakhstan Cup		Total	
Number	Nation	Position	Name	Yellow card	Red card	Yellow card	Red card	Yellow card	Red card
4	(Kazakhstan)	DF	Ilya Vorotnikov	5	0	1	0	6	0
5	(Belarus)	DF	Pavel Kirylchyk	3	0	0	0	3	0
6	(Kazakhstan)	MF	Rakhimzhan Rozybakiyev	1	0	0	0	1	0
7	(Russia)	FW	Artyom Fomin	1	0	0	0	1	0
9	(Kazakhstan)	FW	Murat Suyumagambetov	2	0	0	0	2	0
10	(Kazakhstan)	MF	Ruslan Baltiev	1	0	0	0	1	0
11	(Kazakhstan)	MF	Chingiz Abugaliyev	6	2	0	0	6	2
14	(Kazakhstan)	DF	Nursayn Zholdasov	2	0	0	0	2	0
16	(Kazakhstan)	DF	Yevgeni Goryachi	4	0	0	0	4	0
17	(Russia)	MF	Konstantin Golovskoy	5	1	0	0	5	1
22	(Kazakhstan)	MF	Kirill Shestakov	10	1	1	0	11	1
23	(Kazakhstan)	MF	Yevgeny Kostrub	2	0	0	0	2	0
25	(Kazakhstan)	DF	Madiyar Muminov	5	1	0	0	5	1
26	(Serbia)	DF	Marko Đorđević	6	1	1	0	7	1
27	(Russia)	FW	Sergei Strukov	1	0	0	0	1	0
30	(Kazakhstan)	GK	Andrey Tsvetkov	2	0	0	0	2	0
32	(Turkmenistan)	FW	Wladimir Baýramow	1	0	0	0	1	0
44	(Kazakhstan)	DF	Yevgeni Klimov	7	0	0	0	7	0
77	(Cameroon)	MF	Stéphane Kingué Mpondo	4	1	0	0	4	1
			TOTALS	68	7	3	0	71	7
