= 2011 Kazakhstan Premier League =

Kazakhstan Premier League
- Season: 2011
- Champions: Shakhter
- Relegated: Vostok
- Champions League: Shakhter
- Europa League: Zhetysu; Aktobe; Ordabasy
- Matches: 196
- Goals: 485 (2.47 per match)
- Biggest home win: Aktobe 6–1 Kaisar; Irtysh 5–0 Astana; Astana 6–1 Kairat; Aktobe 7–2 Irtysh
- Biggest away win: Vostok 0–4 Ordabasy; Kaisar 0–4 Zhetysu
- Highest scoring: Aktobe 7–2 Irtysh

The 2011 Kazakhstan Premier League was the 20th season of the Kazakhstan Premier League, the highest football league competition in Kazakhstan. The season began on 6 March 2011 and ended on 29 October 2011. Tobol were the defending champions having won their first league championship last year.

As in the 2010 season, the competition was completed in two stages, with all twelve clubs playing twice against each other before splitting up into two groups of six teams each, according to their position after 22 matches. However, all earned points after the first stage will be halved this time, with any odd numbers of points being rounded up. Shakhter won the championship, the teams' first title.

== Teams ==
Akzhayik and FC Okzhetpes were relegated to the Kazakhstan First Division at the end of last season after finishing in the bottom two places of the table. Akzhayik returned to the Kazakhstan First Division after just one season, while Okzhetpes eventually had to leave the Kazakh top league after 15 seasons.

The relegated teams will be replaced by First Division champions Vostok and Kaisar. Both clubs returned to the league after one-year absences.

In further changes, Lokomotiv Astana renamed themselves FC Astana on 20 May 2011.

Locations of teams in the 2011 Kazakhstan Premier League

| Team | Location | Venue | Capacity |
|---|---|---|---|
| Aktobe | Aktobe | Aktobe Central Stadium | 13,500 |
| Astana | Astana | Astana Arena | 30,000 |
| Atyrau | Atyrau | Munayshy Stadium | 8,660 |
| Irtysh | Pavlodar | Pavlodar Central Stadium | 15,000 |
| Kairat | Almaty | Almaty Central Stadium | 25,057 |
| Kaisar | Kyzylorda | Gany Muratbayev Stadium | 7,300 |
| Ordabasy | Shymkent | K. Munaitpasov Stadium, Shymkent | 37,000 |
| Shakhter | Karagandy | Shakhtyor Stadium | 19,000 |
| Taraz | Taraz | Taraz Central Stadium | 12,525 |
| Tobol | Kostanay | Kostanay Central Stadium | 8,323 |
| Vostok | Oskemen | Vostok Stadium | 8,500 |
| Zhetysu | Taldykorgan | Zhetysu Stadium | 4,000 |

=== Personnel and kits ===
Note: Flags indicate national team as has been defined under FIFA eligibility rules. Players and Managers may hold more than one non-FIFA nationality.

| Team | Manager | Captain | Kit manufacturer | Shirt sponsor |
|---|---|---|---|---|
| Aktobe | (Russia) Vladimir Mukhanov | (Kazakhstan) Samat Smakov | Adidas | |
| Astana | (Germany) Holger Fach | (Kazakhstan) Nurbol Zhumaskaliyev | Adidas | Qazaqstan Temir Zholy |
| Atyrau | (Azerbaijan) Ramiz Mammadov | (Kazakhstan) Andrei Travin | Adidas | |
| Irtysh | (Kazakhstan) Talgat Baisufinov | (Kazakhstan) David Loria | Nike | ENRC |
| Kairat | (England) John Gregory | (Kazakhstan) Ruslan Baltiev | Adidas | KazRosGaz |
| Kaisar | (Lithuania) Algimantas Liubinskas | (Slovenia) Borut Semler | Adidas | |
| Ordabasy | (Ukraine) Viktor Pasulko | (Kazakhstan) Kairat Ashirbekov | Adidas | |
| Shakhter | (Russia) Viktor Kumykov | (Kazakhstan) Andrey Finonchenko | Umbro | ArcelorMittal |
| Taraz | (Kazakhstan) Vait Talgayev | (Kazakhstan) Nurtas Kurgulin | Nike | |
| Tobol | (Russia) Sergei Petrenko | (Kazakhstan) Aleksandr Petukhov | Erreà | |
| Vostok | (Ukraine) Oleksandr Holokolosov | (Kazakhstan) Renat Abdulin | Adidas | |
| Zhetysu | (Kazakhstan) Serik Abdualiyev | (Kazakhstan) Aidar Kumisbekov | Nike | |

=== Foreign players ===
The number of foreign players is restricted to six per KPL team. A team can use only five foreign players on the field in each game.

| Club | Player 1 | Player 2 | Player 3 | Player 4 | Player 5 | Player 6 |
|---|---|---|---|---|---|---|
| Aktobe | (Bosnia and Herzegovina) **Darko Maletić** | (Kyrgyzstan) **Emil Kenzhesariyev** | (Senegal) Malick Mané | (Serbia) Vladimir Đilas | (Serbia) Zoran Kostić | (Trinidad and Tobago) **Robert Primus** |
| Astana | (North Macedonia) **Bobi Božinovski** | (Moldova) **Anatolie Doroș** | (Moldova) **Igor Bugaiov** | (Montenegro) **Dragan Bogavac** | (Serbia) Nenad Erić | (Russia) Aleksei Belkin |
| Atyrau | (Argentina) Javier Leon | (Brazil) Nivaldo | (Netherlands) Kiran Bechan | (Netherlands) Sylvano Comvalius | (Serbia) Bojan Trkulja | |
| Irtysh | (Bulgaria) Georgi Daskalov | (Kyrgyzstan) Sergei Ivanov | (Mali) **Mamoutou Coulibaly** | (Serbia) Predrag Govedarica | (Serbia) Milan Nikolić | (Slovenia) Marko Balažič |
| Kairat | (Belarus) **Pavel Kirylchyk** | (Bulgaria) Deyan Hristov | (Cameroon) Stéphane Kingue Mpondo | (Israel) Yossi Shekel | (Russia) Artyom Fomin | (Serbia) Marko Đorđević |
| Kaisar | (Serbia) Ivan Perić | (Slovenia) Borut Semler | (Nigeria) Philip Edeipo | (Bosnia and Herzegovina) **Gradimir Crnogorac** | | |
| Ordabasy | (Brazil) Vagner | (Nigeria) Baba Collins | (Serbia) Aleksandar Trajković | (Uganda) **Andrew Mwesigwa** | (Ukraine) Artem Kasyanov | |
| Shakhter Karagandy | (Bosnia and Herzegovina) Aldin Đidić | (Bosnia and Herzegovina) **Nikola Vasiljević** | (Lithuania) **Gediminas Vičius** | (Moldova) **Viorel Frunză** | (Serbia) **Dušan Petronijević** | |
| Taraz | (Bosnia and Herzegovina) Damir Memišević | (Senegal) Abdoulaye Diakate | (Serbia) Miloš Adamović | (Serbia) Danilo Belić | (Serbia) Nemanja Jovanović | |
| Tobol | (Armenia) **Robert Zebelyan** | (Serbia) Nenad Šljivić | (Bosnia and Herzegovina) **Samir Bekrić** | (Russia) Vitali Volkov | | |
| Vostok | (Georgia (country)) **Otar Khizaneishvili** | (Ukraine) **Ruslan Bidnenko** | (Ukraine) Ihor Buryak | (Ukraine) Oleksandr Zgura | | |
| Zhetysu | (Lithuania) **Arūnas Klimavičius** | (Serbia) Marko Đalović | (Serbia) Ivan Cvetković | (Serbia) Miloš Mihajlov | | |

In bold: Players that have been capped for their national team.

== First stage ==
=== Standings ===
| Pos | Team | Pld | W | D | L | GF | GA | GD | Pts | Qualification |
|---|---|---|---|---|---|---|---|---|---|---|
| 1 | Zhetysu | 22 | 15 | 4 | 3 | 39 | 16 | +23 | 49 | Qualification for the championship group |
| 2 | Astana (Note: Astana began the season as "Lokomotiv Astana" before being renamed in May 2011.) | 22 | 13 | 6 | 3 | 35 | 19 | +16 | 45 | Qualification for the championship group |
| 3 | Shakhter Karagandy | 22 | 13 | 3 | 6 | 35 | 20 | +15 | 42 | Qualification for the championship group |
| 4 | Aktobe | 22 | 12 | 5 | 5 | 39 | 19 | +20 | 41 | Qualification for the championship group |
| 5 | Irtysh Pavlodar | 22 | 11 | 3 | 8 | 38 | 34 | +4 | 36 | Qualification for the championship group |
| 6 | Ordabasy | 22 | 8 | 7 | 7 | 28 | 19 | +9 | 31 | Qualification for the championship group |
| 7 | Tobol | 22 | 8 | 3 | 11 | 30 | 28 | +2 | 27 | Qualification for the relegation group |
| 8 | Taraz | 22 | 6 | 3 | 13 | 15 | 24 | −9 | 21 | Qualification for the relegation group |
| 9 | Kairat | 22 | 5 | 5 | 12 | 20 | 37 | −17 | 20 | Qualification for the relegation group |
| 10 | Atyrau | 22 | 4 | 8 | 10 | 15 | 30 | −15 | 20 | Qualification for the relegation group |
| 11 | Vostok | 22 | 3 | 9 | 10 | 15 | 32 | −17 | 18 | Qualification for the relegation group |
| 12 | Kaisar | 22 | 4 | 4 | 14 | 13 | 44 | −31 | 16 | Qualification for the relegation group |

Source: kff.kz (in Russian)
Rules for classification: 1st points; 2nd overall wins; 3rd goal difference; 4th goals scored. The winners of the 2011 Kazakhstan Cup competition will qualify for the second qualifying round of the UEFA Europa League.

=== Results ===
During these matches, each team played each other team twice (once at home and once away).

| Home \ Away | AKT | AST | ATY | IRT | KRT | KSR | ORD | SHA | TAR | TOB | VOS | ZHE |
|---|---|---|---|---|---|---|---|---|---|---|---|---|
| Aktobe | | 0–0 | 2–0 | 7–2 | 3–0 | 6–1 | 2–1 | 0–1 | 0–0 | 2–1 | 3–0 | 1–1 |
| Astana | 1–0 | | 3–2 | 0–0 | 6–1 | 5–1 | 1–0 | 2–0 | 1–0 | 3–1 | 2–0 | 0–2 |
| Atyrau | 1–1 | 0–0 | | 1–0 | 2–2 | 0–0 | 1–1 | 1–4 | 1–0 | 0–2 | 0–1 | 1–0 |
| Irtysh Pavlodar | 2–3 | 5–0 | 3–0 | | 1–1 | 4–1 | 2–0 | 2–1 | 1–0 | 3–2 | 3–1 | 2–3 |
| Kairat | 3–0 | 2–3 | 2–0 | 1–3 | | 0–0 | 0–3 | 2–1 | 1–0 | 0–0 | 1–1 | 0–1 |
| Kaisar | 0–2 | 2–4 | 1–0 | 1–0 | 2–0 | | 1–2 | 0–1 | 1–0 | 0–3 | 1–1 | 0–4 |
| Ordabasy | 0–1 | 1–1 | 1–1 | 3–0 | 2–0 | 1–1 | | 1–0 | 0–1 | 1–0 | 0–0 | 0–1 |
| Shakhter Karagandy | 1–0 | 0–0 | 0–2 | 3–0 | 4–2 | 2–0 | 2–2 | | 3–0 | 2–0 | 2–0 | 3–3 |
| Taraz | 0–2 | 1–2 | 3–0 | 0–1 | 1–0 | 1–0 | 1–1 | 0–1 | | 1–0 | 3–1 | 0–1 |
| Tobol | 1–2 | 0–1 | 0–0 | 4–1 | 3–1 | 3–0 | 1–3 | 1–2 | 3–0 | | 1–0 | 1–0 |
| Vostok | 0–0 | 0–0 | 2–2 | 1–2 | 1–0 | 2–0 | 0–4 | 1–2 | 1–1 | 2–2 | | 0–0 |
| Zhetysu | 3–2 | 1–0 | 2–0 | 1–1 | 0–1 | 3–0 | 2–1 | 1–0 | 3–2 | 4–1 | 3–0 | |

Source: kff.kz (in Russian)
Legend: Blue = home team win; Yellow = draw; Red = away team win.

== Second stage ==
=== Standings ===
| Pos | Team | Pld | W | D | L | GF | GA | GD | Pts | Qualification or relegation |
|---|---|---|---|---|---|---|---|---|---|---|
| 1 | Shakhter Karagandy (C) | 32 | 19 | 6 | 7 | 52 | 29 | +23 | 42 | Qualification for the Champions League second qualifying round |
| 2 | Zhetysu | 32 | 19 | 5 | 8 | 51 | 27 | +24 | 38 | Qualification for the Europa League first qualifying round (Note: The winners of the 2011 Kazakhstan Cup competition will qualify for the first qualifying round of the UEFA Europa League.) |
| 3 | Aktobe | 32 | 15 | 9 | 8 | 53 | 31 | +22 | 34 | Qualification for the Europa League first qualifying round |
| 4 | Astana (Note: Astana began the season as "Lokomotiv Astana" before being renamed in May 2011.) | 32 | 16 | 7 | 9 | 50 | 37 | +13 | 33 | |
| 5 | Irtysh Pavlodar | 32 | 15 | 5 | 12 | 50 | 50 | 0 | 32 | |
| 6 | Ordabasy | 32 | 11 | 10 | 11 | 41 | 36 | +5 | 28 | Qualification for the Europa League first qualifying round |
| 7 | Tobol | 32 | 14 | 3 | 15 | 48 | 44 | +4 | 32 | |
| 8 | Kaisar | 32 | 10 | 5 | 17 | 29 | 53 | −24 | 27 | |
| 9 | Taraz | 32 | 10 | 5 | 17 | 30 | 39 | −9 | 25 | |
| 10 | Atyrau | 32 | 8 | 10 | 14 | 28 | 43 | −15 | 24 | |
| 11 | Kairat | 32 | 8 | 8 | 16 | 30 | 49 | −19 | 22 | |
| 12 | Vostok (R) | 32 | 5 | 11 | 16 | 23 | 47 | −24 | 17 | Relegation to the Kazakhstan First Division |

Source: kff.kz (in Russian)
Rules for classification: 1st points; 2nd overall wins; 3rd goal difference; 4th goals scored.
(C) Champions; (R) Relegated

=== Results ===
During these matches, each team played every other team in their half of the table twice (once at home and once away).

Top six
| Home \ Away | AKT | AST | IRT | ORD | SHA | ZHE |
|---|---|---|---|---|---|---|
| Aktobe | | 1–0 | 2–0 | 2–0 | 1–1 | 1–1 |
| Astana | 3–2 | | 5–1 | 1–3 | 1–2 | 1–0 |
| Irtysh Pavlodar | 0–0 | 3–1 | | 3–0 | 2–1 | 2–1 |
| Ordabasy | 2–4 | 3–2 | 0–0 | | 0–0 | 1–2 |
| Shakhter Karagandy | 2–1 | 2–0 | 3–1 | 2–2 | | 2–1 |
| Zhetysu | 2–0 | 1–0 | 3–0 | 1–2 | 0–2 | |

Source: kff.kz (in Russian)
Legend: Blue = home team win; Yellow = draw; Red = away team win.

Bottom six
| Home \ Away | ATY | KRT | KSR | TAR | TOB | VOS |
|---|---|---|---|---|---|---|
| Atyrau | | 3–0 | 0–2 | 0–1 | 2–1 | 2–1 |
| Kairat | 1–1 | | 2–0 | 1–1 | 3–0 | 2–1 |
| Kaisar | 1–0 | 2–0 | | 2–0 | 4–1 | 2–0 |
| Taraz | 1–1 | 2–1 | 4–2 | | 1–3 | 3–1 |
| Tobol | 4–2 | 2–0 | 2–1 | 2–1 | | 0–1 |
| Vostok | 1–2 | 0–0 | 0–0 | 2–1 | 1–3 | |

Source: kff.kz (in Russian)
Legend: Blue = home team win; Yellow = draw; Red = away team win.

== Top goalscorers ==
Last updated: 2 November 2011

| Rank | Player | Club | Goals (Pen.) |
|---|---|---|---|
| 1 | (Uzbekistan) Ulugbek Bakaev | Zhetysu | 18 |
| 2 | (Kazakhstan) Sergei Khizhnichenko | Shakhter | 16 |
| 3 | (Senegal) Malick Mane | Aktobe | 12 |
| 3 | (Montenegro) Dragan Bogavac | Astana | 12 |
| 3 | (Kazakhstan) Sergey Gridin | Tobol | 12 |
| 6 | (Kazakhstan) Daurenbek Tazhimbetov | Ordabasy | 11 |
| 7 | (Kazakhstan) Marat Khairullin | Aktobe | 10 |
| 7 | (Kazakhstan) Gleb Maltsev | Irtysh | 10 |
| 7 | (Kazakhstan) Nurbol Zhumaskaliyev | Astana | 10 |
| 7 | (Russia) Konstantin Golovskoy | Kairat | 10 |
| 11 | (Bulgaria) Georgi Daskalov | Irtysh | 9 |
| 11 | (Kazakhstan) Zhambyl Kukeyev | Shakhter | 9 |
