= 2007 FC Rubin Kazan season =

FC Rubin Kazan
2007 season
- Chairman: Farit Khabriyev
- Manager: Kurban Berdyev
- Stadium: Central Stadium
- Premier League: 10th
- Russian Cup: Quarter-final (vs. CSKA Moscow)
- Russian Cup: Round of 16 (vs. Spartak Nalchik)
- UEFA Intertoto Cup: Third round (vs. Rapid Wien)
- Top goalscorer: League: Aleksandr Ryazantsev (5); All: Aleksandr Ryazantsev (6)
- Highest home attendance: 20,000 vs Spartak Moscow (25 August 2007)
- Lowest home attendance: 4,000 vs Rostov (7 March 2007)
- Average home league attendance: 10,528 (11 November 2007)

The 2007 FC Rubin Kazan season was the club's 5th season in the Russian Premier League, the highest tier of association football in Russia. They finished the season in tenth position.

== Squad ==
As of match played 11 November 2007

No.	Name	Nationality	Position	Date of birth (age)	Signed from	Signed in	Contract ends	Apps.	Goals
Goalkeepers
1	Aleksandrs Koliņko	(Latvia)	GK	18 June 1975 (aged 32)	Rostov	2005		84	0
29	Nukri Revishvili	(Georgia (country))	GK	2 March 1987 (aged 20)	Torpedo Kutaisi	2006		7	0
79	Pavel Kharchik	(Turkmenistan)	GK	5 April 1979 (aged 28)	Neftekhimik Nizhnekamsk	2004			
Defenders
2	Stjepan Tomas	(Croatia)	DF	6 March 1976 (aged 31)	Galatasaray	2007		11	0
3	Calisto	(Brazil)	DF	18 December 1975 (aged 31)	Bahia	2003		90	8
4	Jean	(Brazil)	DF	18 November 1979 (aged 27)	loan from Saturn Ramenskoye	2007		23	3
5	Andrei Fyodorov	(Uzbekistan)	DF	10 April 1971 (aged 36)	Baltika Kaliningrad	2000			
9	Lasha Salukvadze	(Georgia (country))	DF	21 December 1981 (aged 25)	Dinamo Tbilisi	2005		65	1
21	Mikhail Sinyov	(Russia)	DF	21 June 1972 (aged 35)	Torpedo-ZIL Moscow	2002			
28	Sergei Nesterenko	(Russia)	DF	30 December 1986 (aged 20)	Dynamo Barnaul	2007		2	0
31	Gabriel	(Brazil)	DF	4 August 1981 (aged 26)	União de Leiria	2006	2009	43	5
44	Igor Klimov	(Russia)	DF	1 November 1989 (aged 18)	Youth Team	2007		1	0
45	Irek Ganiyev	(Russia)	DF	16 January 1986 (aged 21)	Youth Team	2006		0	0
53	Sergei Golyatkin	(Russia)	DF	4 May 1988 (aged 19)	CSKA Moscow	2007		6	0
60	Aleksandr Kulikov	(Russia)	DF	19 March 1988 (aged 19)	Youth Team	2007		0	0
Midfielders
6	MacBeth Sibaya	(South Africa)	MF	25 November 1977 (aged 29)	Rosenborg	2003		90	2
8	Pyotr Gitselov	(Russia)	MF	18 July 1983 (aged 24)	Bodens	2007		12	0
11	Vitali Volkov	(Russia)	MF	22 March 1981 (aged 26)	Torpedo Moscow	2007		28	6
12	Marat Bikmaev	(Uzbekistan)	MF	1 January 1986 (aged 21)	Krylia Sovetov	2006		1	1
14	Kang Sun-kyu	(South Korea)	MF	20 April 1986 (aged 21)	Konkuk University	2006		2	0
15	Aleksandr Ryazantsev	(Russia)	MF	5 September 1986 (aged 21)	Moscow	2006		42	6
16	Christian Noboa	(Ecuador)	MF	9 April 1985 (aged 22)	Emelec	2007		20	1
18	Branimir Petrović	(Serbia)	MF	26 June 1982 (aged 25)	loan from KAMAZ	2007		6	1
19	Selim Benachour	(Tunisia)	MF	8 September 1981 (aged 26)	Vitória de Guimarães	2006	2009	29	4
20	Gabriel Giurgiu	(Romania)	MF	3 September 1982 (aged 25)	Oțelul Galați	2007		4	0
22	Sergei Budylin	(Russia)	MF	31 October 1979 (aged 28)	Torpedo Moscow	2007		27	3
23	Yevgeni Balyaikin	(Russia)	MF	19 May 1988 (aged 19)	Sibiryak Bratsk	2007		4	0
26	Alexandru Gațcan	(Moldova)	MF	27 March 1984 (aged 23)	Spartak Chelyabinsk	2006	2008	51	4
41	Andrei Kireyev	(Russia)	MF	6 July 1985 (aged 22)	Nosta Novotroitsk	2006		7	0
48	Vadim Afonin	(Uzbekistan)	MF	29 September 1987 (aged 20)	Traktor Tashkent	2006		0	0
49	Vagiz Galiulin	(Uzbekistan)	MF	10 October 1987 (aged 20)	Traktor Tashkent	2007		1	0
55	Ruslan Arkhipov	(Russia)	MF	2 March 1987 (aged 20)	Youth Team	2007		0	0
77	Ansar Ayupov	(Russia)	MF	23 March 1972 (aged 35)	Chernomorets Novorossiysk	2004		82	6
98	Dmitri Vasilyev	(Russia)	MF	25 March 1977 (aged 30)	Shinnik Yaroslavl	2005		47	2
Forwards
7	Jaílson	(Brazil)	FW	16 June 1986 (aged 21)	loan from Corinthians	2007	2007	9	0
10	Damani Ralph	(Jamaica)	FW	6 November 1980 (aged 27)	Chicago Fire	2005		26	2
27	Veljko Paunović	(Serbia)	FW	21 August 1977 (aged 30)	Getafe	2007		18	2
30	Aleksandr Bukharov	(Russia)	FW	12 March 1985 (aged 22)	Chernomorets Novorossiysk	2005		22	8
32	Wladimir Baýramow	(Turkmenistan)	FW	2 August 1980 (aged 27)	Metallurg Krasnoyarsk	2003		86	13
54	Vladimir Dyadyun	(Russia)	FW	12 July 1988 (aged 19)	Youth Team	2007		6	1
67	Davron Mirzaev	(Uzbekistan)	FW	8 February 1989 (aged 18)	Pakhtakor Tashkent	2007		0	0
99	Hasan Kabze	(Turkey)	FW	26 May 1982 (aged 25)	Galatasaray	2007		11	4
Away on loan
20	Fábio	(Portugal)	MF	2 May 1982 (aged 25)	Real Sociedad	2007		9	0
42	Mikhail Bagayev	(Russia)	DF	28 February 1985 (aged 22)	Moscow	2006		1	0
46	Aleksandr Yarkin	(Russia)	FW	29 December 1986 (aged 20)	Dynamo Barnaul	2006		8	0
	Walter García	(Argentina)	DF	14 March 1984 (aged 23)	San Lorenzo	2006	2009	5	0
	Dmitri Shestakov	(Russia)	MF	26 February 1983 (aged 24)	Sportakademklub Moscow	2005		0	0
Players that left Rubin Kazan during the season
17	Lenar Gilmullin	(Russia)	DF	17 June 1985 (aged 22)	Youth Team	2003		33	2
18	Dzhambulad Bazayev	(Russia)	MF	18 August 1979 (aged 28)	Alania Vladikavkaz	2006		22	3

=== On loan ===
Note: Flags indicate national team as defined under FIFA eligibility rules; some limited exceptions apply. Players may hold more than one non-FIFA nationality.

No.	Pos.	Nation	Player
20	MF	POR	Fábio (at Marítimo)
42	MF	RUS	Mikhail Bagayev (at SKA-Energia Khabarovsk)
46	FW	RUS	Aleksandr Yarkin (at SKA-Energia Khabarovsk)

No.	Pos.	Nation	Player
—	DF	ARG	Walter García (at Quilmes)
—	MF	RUS	Dmitri Shestakov (at Spartak Kostroma)

=== Left club during season ===
Note: Flags indicate national team as defined under FIFA eligibility rules; some limited exceptions apply. Players may hold more than one non-FIFA nationality.

No. / Pos. / Nation / Player; 17 / DF / RUS / Lenar Gilmullin (his death)	No. / Pos. / Nation / Player; 18 / MF / RUS / Dzhambulad Bazayev (to Alania Vladikavkaz)

== Transfers ==
=== In ===
Date	Position	Nationality	Name	From	Fee	Ref.
Winter 2007	DF	(Russia)	Sergei Golyatkin	CSKA Moscow	Undisclosed	
Winter 2007	DF	(Russia)	Sergei Nesterenko	Dynamo Barnaul	Undisclosed	
Winter 2007	MF	(Ecuador)	Christian Noboa	Emelec	Undisclosed	
Winter 2007	MF	(Portugal)	Fábio	Real Sociedad	Undisclosed	
Winter 2007	MF	(Romania)	Gabriel Giurgiu	Oțelul Galați	Undisclosed	
Winter 2007	MF	(Russia)	Yevgeni Balyaikin	Sibiryak Bratsk	Undisclosed	
Winter 2007	MF	(Russia)	Sergei Budylin	Torpedo Moscow	Undisclosed	
Winter 2007	MF	(Russia)	Pyotr Gitselov	Bodens	Undisclosed	
Winter 2007	MF	(Russia)	Vitali Volkov	Torpedo Moscow	Undisclosed	
Winter 2007	MF	(Uzbekistan)	Vagiz Galiulin	Traktor Tashkent	Undisclosed	
Winter 2007	FW	(Uzbekistan)	Davron Mirzaev	Pakhtakor Tashkent	Undisclosed	
August 2007	DF	(Croatia)	Stjepan Tomas	Galatasaray	Undisclosed	
Summer 2007	FW	(Serbia)	Veljko Paunović	Getafe	Undisclosed	
Summer 2007	FW	(Turkey)	Hasan Kabze	Galatasaray	Undisclosed	

=== Loans in ===
Date from	Position	Nationality	Name	To	Date to	Ref.
Winter 2007	DF	(Brazil)	Jean	Saturn Ramenskoye	End of Season	
Winter 2007	MF	(Serbia)	Branimir Petrović	KAMAZ	End of Season	
22 February 2007	FW	(Brazil)	Jaílson	Corinthians	November 2007	

=== Out ===
Date	Position	Nationality	Name	To	Fee	Ref.
February 2007	MF	(Norway)	Jørgen Jalland	Vålerenga	Undisclosed	
Summer 2007	MF	(Russia)	Dzhambulad Bazayev	Alania Vladikavkaz	Undisclosed	

=== Loans out ===
Date from	Position	Nationality	Name	To	Date to	Ref.
Winter 2007	DF	(Argentina)	Walter García	Quilmes	Summer 2008	
Winter 2007	MF	(Russia)	Dmitri Shestakov	Spartak-MZhK Ryazan	Summer 2007	
Winter 2007	DF	(Russia)	Mikhail Bagayev	SKA-Energia Khabarovsk	End of Season	
Winter 2007	FW	(Russia)	Aleksandr Yarkin	SKA-Energia Khabarovsk	End of Season	
Summer 2007	MF	(Portugal)	Fábio	Marítimo	Summer 2008	
Summer 2007	MF	(Russia)	Dmitri Shestakov	Spartak Kostroma	Winter 2008	

=== Released ===
Date	Position	Nationality	Name	Joined	Date
22 June 2007	DF	(Russia)	Lenar Gilmullin	His Death	
End of Season	DF	(Brazil)	Calisto	Vasco da Gama	
End of Season	DF	(Russia)	Irek Ganiyev	Rubin-2 Kazan	
End of Season	DF	(Russia)	Sergei Golyatkin	Vityaz Podolsk	
End of Season	DF	(Russia)	Mikhail Sinyov	Ural Sverdlovsk Oblast	
End of Season	MF	(Russia)	Ruslan Arkhipov	Rubin-2 Kazan	
End of Season	MF	(Russia)	Ansar Ayupov	Baltika Kaliningrad	
End of Season	MF	(Tunisia)	Selim Benachour	Qadsia	
End of Season	MF	(Uzbekistan)	Marat Bikmaev	Spartak Nalchik	
End of Season	MF	(Russia)	Sergei Budylin	Krylia Sovetov	
End of Season	MF	(South Korea)	Kang Sun-kyu	Daejeon Citizen	
End of Season	MF	(Russia)	Andrei Kireyev	Rostov	
End of Season	MF	(Russia)	Vitali Volkov	Tom Tomsk	
End of Season	FW	(Turkmenistan)	Wladimir Baýramow	Khimki	
End of Season	FW	(Serbia)	Veljko Paunović	Almería	
End of Season	FW	(Jamaica)	Damani Ralph		

== Competitions ==
=== Premier League ===
==== Results by round ====
Round	1	2	3	4	5	6	7	8	9	10	11	12	13	14	15	16	17	18	19	20	21	22	23	24	25	26	27	28	29	30
Ground	A	A	H	A	H	A	H	A	H	A	H	A	H	A	H	H	A	H	A	H	A	H	A	H	A	H	A	H	A	H
Result	L	L	W	L	D	L	D	L	W	L	W	L	W	W	W	W	D	W	L	L	D	W	L	L	L	L	L	D	W	L

Updated to match(es) played on 11 November 2007. Source: See Results
A = Away; H = Home; W = Win; D = Draw; L = Loss

==== Results ====
11 March 2007 1	CSKA Moscow	3 – 1	Rubin Kazan	Moscow
14:00 MSK (UTC+3)	Šemberas (yellow card) 17'; Aldonin (yellow card) 28' (goal) 45+2'; Ignashevich 52' (pen.); Jô 63'	Report	Ryazantsev (yellow card) 23'; Gabriel 29'; Noboa (yellow card) 33'; Fyodorov (yellow card) 51'	Stadium: Luzhniki Stadium; Attendance: 6,000; Referee: Eduard Malyi

17 March 2007 2	Lokomotiv Moscow	2 – 1	Rubin Kazan	Moscow
18:00 MSK (UTC+3)	Rodolfo 21' (yellow card) 21'; Cociș 47'	Report	Gilmullin 33'; Noboa (yellow card) 43'; Gabriel (yellow card) 58'; Gațcan (yellow card) 71'	Stadium: RZD Arena; Attendance: 15,101; Referee: Alexander Gonchar

31 March 2007 3	Rubin Kazan	2 – 1	Khimki	Kazan
17:00 MSK (UTC+3)	Jean 56'; Sibaya (yellow card) 64'; Gabriel (yellow card) 76'; Gațcan 89'	Report	Antipenko 45'; Orlov (yellow card) 90+'	Stadium: Central Stadium; Attendance: 16,000; Referee: Sergeyev Aleksey

8 April 2007 4	Spartak Nalchik	1 – 0	Rubin Kazan	Nalchik
17:00 MSK (UTC+3)	Amisulashvili (yellow card) 28'; Shumeyko 50'	Report	Budylin (yellow card) 49'; Gabriel (yellow card) 90'	Stadium: Spartak Stadium; Attendance: 12,000; Referee: Valentin Ivanov

14 April 2007 5	Rubin Kazan	1 – 1	Moscow	Kazan
17:00 MSK (UTC+3)	Ryazantsev 11'; Gilmullin (yellow card) 61'; Jean (yellow card) 72'; Sibaya (yellow card) 84'	Report	Semak 22'; Godunok (yellow card) 31'; Barrientos (yellow card) 79'	Stadium: Central Stadium; Attendance: 10,000; Referee: Nikolai Ivanov

21 April 2007 6	Saturn Ramenskoye	1 – 0	Rubin Kazan	Ramenskoye
16:30 MSK (UTC+3)	Igonin (yellow card) 62'; Česnauskis 66'	Report	Gabriel (yellow card) 14'; Gațcan (yellow card) 90'	Stadium: Saturn Stadium; Attendance: 7,200; Referee: Alexander Kolobaev

29 April 2007 7	Rubin Kazan	0 – 0	Rostov	Kazan
18:00 MSK (UTC+3)		Report	Mogilevskiy (yellow card) 57'; Dantsev (yellow card) 72'	Stadium: Central Stadium; Attendance: 7,000; Referee: Aleksei Nikolaev

6 May 2007 8	Spartak Moscow	2 – 1	Rubin Kazan	Moscow
14:00 MSK (UTC+3)	Boyarintsev (yellow card) 39' (goal) 90+'; Titov 45+'	Report	Jean (yellow card) 26'; Gilmullin (yellow card) 45'; Budylin 90' (pen.)	Stadium: Luzhniki Stadium; Attendance: 12,000; Referee: Alexander Gonchar

13 May 2007 9	Rubin Kazan	1 – 0	Amkar Perm	Kazan
15:30 MSK (UTC+3)	Baýramow (yellow card) 8'; Gabriel (yellow card) 45' (goal) 52'; Gațcan (yellow card) 47'; Fábio (yellow card) 64' (yellow-red card) 83'; Ayupov (yellow card) 88'; Jean (yellow card) 90+'	Report	Volkov (yellow card) 31'; Peev (yellow card) 56'	Stadium: Central Stadium; Attendance: 10,000; Referee: Sergey Timofeev

20 May 2007 10	Zenit St.Petersburg	2 – 1	Rubin Kazan	Saint Petersburg
14:00 MSK (UTC+3)	Kim (yellow card) 7'; Škrtel 68'; Arshavin (yellow card) 76' (goal) 78'; Ricksen (yellow card) 90+'	Report	Gabriel 41'; Jean (yellow card) 76' (yellow-red card) 90+'; Gațcan (yellow card) 89'	Stadium: Petrovsky Stadium; Attendance: 21,000; Referee: Valentin Ivanov

26 May 2007 11	Rubin Kazan	3 – 0	Luch-Energia Vladivostok	Kazan
14:00 MSK (UTC+3)	Gabriel 16'; Baýramow 43', 89' (yellow card) 84'; Vasilyev (yellow card) 64'; Volkov (yellow card) 73'	Report	R.Ajinjal (yellow card) 43'; Novković (yellow card) 52'; B.Ajinjal (penalty missed) 80'	Stadium: Central Stadium; Attendance: 8,000; Referee: Aleksei Sergeyev

9 June 2007 12	Tom Tomsk	2 – 0	Rubin Kazan	Tomsk
15:00 MSK (UTC+3)	Klimov 61'; Kiselyov 72'	Report	Jean (yellow card) 77'; Benachour (yellow card) 85'	Stadium: Trud Stadium; Attendance: 14,000; Referee: Yuri Baskakov

16 June 2007 13	Rubin Kazan	1 – 0	Krylia Sovetov	Kazan
18:30 MSK (UTC+3)	Ryazantsev 42' (yellow card) 58'; Gilmullin (yellow card) 88'; Yarkin (yellow card) 90+'	Report	Branco (yellow card) 19'	Stadium: Central Stadium; Attendance: 12,500; Referee: Alexander Kolobaev

23 June 2007 14	Kuban Krasnodar	0 – 1	Rubin Kazan	Krasnodar
21:00 MSK (UTC+3)	Baiano (yellow card) 76'	Report	Ryazantsev 39'; Ayupov (yellow card) 45+'; Jean (yellow card) 47'; Gațcan (yellow card) 51'; Sibaya (penalty missed) 85'	Stadium: Kuban Stadium; Attendance: 13,000; Referee: Eduard Malyi

1 July 2007 15	Rubin Kazan	2 – 1	Dynamo Moscow	Kazan
19:00 MSK (UTC+3)	Fyodorov (yellow card) 35'; Ryazantsev 38'; Gațcan (yellow card) 60'; Baýramow 65'; Vasilyev (yellow card) 70'	Report	Kolodin 35' (pen.); Danny (yellow card) 41'	Stadium: Central Stadium; Attendance: 15,000; Referee: Yuri Klyuchnikov

1 July 2007 16	Rubin Kazan	3 – 0	Lokomotiv Moscow	Kazan
MSK (UTC+3)	Ryazantsev 1'; Budylin 28' (pen.); Gațcan (yellow card) 69'; Volkov (yellow card) 80'; Yarkin 85'	Report	Pelizzoli (yellow card) 80'	Stadium: Central Stadium; Attendance: 18,000; Referee: Vitali Doroshenko

22 July 2007 17	Khimki	0 – 0	Rubin Kazan	Khimki
MSK (UTC+3)	Jovanović (yellow card) 31'; Orlov (yellow card) 60'; Zebelyan (yellow card) 90'	Report	Jean (yellow card) 33'; Vasilyev (yellow card) 78'; Gabriel (yellow card) 87'; Gațcan (yellow card) 90'	Stadium: Rodina Stadium; Attendance: 7,150; Referee: Maksim Layushkin

28 July 2007 18	Rubin Kazan	2 – 1	Spartak Nalchik	Kazan
MSK (UTC+3)	Budylin (yellow card) 10'; Salukvadze 54'; Sibaya (yellow card) 74'; Kabze 79'; Vasilyev (yellow card) 85'	Report	Pylypchuk (yellow card) 61'; Amisulashvili 70'; Kazharov (yellow card) 75'	Stadium: Central Stadium; Attendance: 6,000; Referee: Nikolai Ivanov

5 August 2007 19	Moscow	2 – 1	Rubin Kazan	Moscow
17:00 MSK (UTC+3)	Bystrov 5' (yellow card) 28'; Godunok (yellow card) 35'; Čížek (yellow card) 59'; Semak 82' (yellow card) 84'	Report	Budylin 11' (pen.); Jean (yellow card) 56'; Kireyev (yellow card) 62'; Ayupov (yellow card) 80'	Stadium: Eduard Streltsov Stadium; Attendance: 3,500; Referee: Nikolai Ivanov

12 August 2007 20	Rubin Kazan	0 – 1	Saturn Ramenskoye	Kazan
18:30 MSK (UTC+3)	Gațcan (yellow card) 33'; Sibaya (yellow card) 78'; Dyadyun (yellow card) 85'	Report	Kirichenko 17'; Eremenko (yellow card) 19'; Karyaka (yellow card) 45'; Česnauskis (yellow card) 59'	Stadium: Central Stadium; Attendance: 10,000; Referee: Igor Egorov

19 August 2007 21	Rostov	1 – 1	Rubin Kazan	Rostov-on-Don
20:30 MSK (UTC+3)	Kanyenda (yellow card) 40'; Nađ (yellow card) 69'; Osinov 86'	Report	Baýramow 13'; Volkov (yellow card) 46'; Sinyov (yellow card) 73'; Sibaya (red card) 73'	Stadium: Olimp-2; Attendance: 7,000; Referee: Alexander Gonchar

25 August 2007 22	Rubin Kazan	3 – 1	Spartak Moscow	Kazan
18:00 MSK (UTC+3)	Paunović 20'; Noboa 49' (yellow card) 81'; Vasilyev (yellow card) 60' (yellow-red card) 65'; Kabze 62'	Report	Pavlyuchenko (yellow card) 22'; Welliton 37'; Bystrov (yellow card) 67'; Kalynychenko (yellow card) 89'; Kováč (yellow card) 90+'	Stadium: Central Stadium; Attendance: 20,000; Referee: Stanislav Sukhina

1 September 2007 23	Amkar Perm	2 – 1	Rubin Kazan	Perm
16:00 MSK (UTC+3)	Kushev 33', 44' (pen.); Drinčić (yellow card) 72'	Report	Noboa (yellow card) 49'; Tomas (yellow card) 83'; Jean 85'	Stadium: Zvezda Stadium; Attendance: 17,200; Referee: Aleksei Nikolaev

23 September 2007 24	Rubin Kazan	1 – 4	Zenit St.Petersburg	Kazan
19:30 MSK (UTC+3)	Benachour (yellow card) 76'; Bazayev 82'	Report	Pogrebnyak 18', 57'; Zyryanov 22'; Denisov 72'	Stadium: Central Stadium; Attendance: 18,000; Referee: Yuri Baskakov

29 September 2007 25	Luch-Energia Vladivostok	2 – 0	Rubin Kazan	Vladivostok
12:00 MSK (UTC+3)	Kralevski (yellow card) 9'; Semochko 55'; R.Ajinjal (yellow card) 58'; B.Ajinjal (yellow card) 82'; Strelkov 89'	Report	Sinyov (yellow card) 10'; Calisto (yellow card) 52'; Paunović (yellow card) 57'; Petrović (yellow card) 72'; Kabze (yellow card) 74'	Stadium: Dynamo Stadium; Attendance: 10,000; Referee: Eduard Malyi

7 October 2007 26	Rubin Kazan	1 – 3	Tom Tomsk	Kazan
16:30 MSK (UTC+3)	Volkov 18'	Report	Maznov 5', 47', 69'; Stroyev (yellow card) 71'; Tarasov (yellow card) 90'	Stadium: Central Stadium; Attendance: 7,000; Referee: Alexander Kolobaev

21 October 2007 27	Krylia Sovetov	3 – 0	Rubin Kazan	Samara
15:00 MSK (UTC+3)	Topić 40'; Quintero (yellow card) 66' (goal) 87'; Lobos (yellow card) 75'; Booth 79'	Report	Tomas (yellow card) 76'; Baýramow (yellow card) 78'; Jean (yellow card) 83'	Stadium: Metallurg Stadium; Attendance: 19,000; Referee: Stanislav Sukhina

27 October 2007 28	Rubin Kazan	2 – 2	Kuban Krasnodar	Kazan
18:30 MSK (UTC+3)	Kabze 56'; Dyadyun (yellow card) 58' (goal) 76'; Volkov (yellow card) 64'; Petrović (yellow card) 90+'	Report	Laizāns 38'; Okoduwa 61' (yellow card) 78'; Topchu (yellow card) 84'	Stadium: Central Stadium; Attendance: 7,000; Referee: Maksim Layushkin

3 November 2007 29	Dynamo Moscow	0 – 1	Rubin Kazan	Moscow
14:00 MSK (UTC+3)	D.Kombarov (yellow card) 14'; K.Kombarov (yellow card) 27'	Report	Gabriel (yellow card) 23'; Dyadyun (yellow card) 38'; Baýramow (yellow card) 46'; Kabze 61'	Stadium: Dynamo Stadium; Attendance: 6,500; Referee: Nikolai Ivanov

11 November 2007 30	Rubin Kazan	0 – 1	CSKA Moscow	Kazan
14:00 MSK (UTC+3)	Paunović (yellow card) 88'; Gabriel (yellow card) 90'	Report	Ignashevich 78'; Vágner Love (yellow card) 88'	Stadium: Central Stadium; Attendance: 10,000; Referee: Aleksandr Gonchar

==== League table ====
Pos	Team	Pld	W	D	L	GF	GA	GD	Pts	Qualification or relegation
1	Zenit St. Petersburg (C)	30	18	7	5	54	32	+22	61	2008–09 UEFA Champions League Group stage
2	Spartak Moscow	30	17	8	5	50	30	+20	59	2008–09 UEFA Champions League Third qualifying round
3	CSKA Moscow	30	14	11	5	43	24	+19	53	2008–09 UEFA Cup First round (Note: Qualified as the winner of 2007–08 Russian Cup)
4	FC Moscow	30	15	7	8	40	32	+8	52	2008–09 UEFA Cup Second qualifying round
5	Saturn	30	11	12	7	34	28	+6	45	2008 UEFA Intertoto Cup Second round
6	Dynamo Moscow	30	11	8	11	37	35	+2	41	
7	Lokomotiv Moscow	30	11	8	11	39	42	−3	41	
8	Amkar Perm	30	10	11	9	30	27	+3	41	
9	Khimki	30	9	10	11	32	33	−1	37	
10	Rubin Kazan	30	10	5	15	31	39	−8	35	
11	Tom Tomsk	30	8	11	11	37	35	+2	35	
12	Spartak Nalchik	30	8	9	13	29	38	−9	33	
13	Krylia Sovetov Samara	30	8	8	14	35	46	−11	32	
14	Luch-Energiya Vladivostok	30	8	8	14	26	39	−13	32	
15	Kuban Krasnodar (R)	30	7	11	12	27	38	−11	32	Relegation to 2008 Russian First Division
16	Rostov (R)	30	2	12	16	18	44	−26	18	Relegation to 2008 Russian First Division

Source: RFPL
Rules for classification: 1st points; 2nd matches won; 3rd goal difference; 4th head-to-head (points, matches won, goal difference, goals scored, away goals scored); 5th goals scored; 6th away goals scored; 7th drawing of lots
(C) Champions; (R) Relegated

=== Russian Cup ===
==== 2006-07 ====
4 March 2007 Last 16 1st leg	Rostov	3 – 1	Rubin Kazan	Rostov-on-Don
15:00 MSK (UTC+3)	Noboa 15' (o.g.); Vještica (yellow card) 17'; Dantsev 35'; Bochkov 66'; Kalachev (yellow card) 68'; Pjanović (yellow card) 90'	Report	Gabriel 17' (yellow card) 89'; Fábio (yellow card) 45'; Gilmullin (yellow card) 58'; Sinyov (yellow card) 84'	Stadium: Olimp-2; Attendance: 6,000; Referee: Alexander Kolobaev

7 March 2007 Last 16 2nd leg	Rubin Kazan	0 – 1 (1 – 4 agg.)	Rostov	Vladikavkaz
14:00 MSK (UTC+3)	Fyodorov (yellow card) 31'; Benachour (yellow card) 69'	Report	Osinov 27' (pen.); Kalachev (yellow card) 30'; Vještica (yellow card) 58'	Stadium: Republican Spartak Stadium; Attendance: 4,000; Referee: Valentin Ivanov
Note: Match played at the Republican Spartak Stadium in Vladikavkaz instead of Rubin Kazan's regular Central Stadium in Kazan.

==== 2007-08 ====
27 June 2007 Round of 32	Lukhovitsy	1 – 2	Rubin Kazan	Lukhovitsy
19:00 MSK (UTC+3)	Titov (yellow card) 38'; Rybin 84'	Report	Volkov 7'; Gațcan 56'; Gitselov (yellow card) 90+'	Stadium: Spartak Stadium; Attendance: 3,200; Referee: Sergei Karasev

8 August 2007 Round of 16	Spartak Nalchik	3 – 2 (a.e.t.)	Rubin Kazan	Nalchik
20:00 MSK (UTC+3)	Dzakhmishev 34'; Yatchenko (yellow card) 49'; Krashchenko (yellow card) 59'; Geteriev 98'; Rodenkov (yellow card) 100'; Dyshekov 116'	Report	Paunović 9'; Yarkin (yellow card) 85'; Fyodorov (yellow card) 101'; Ayupov 114'	Stadium: Spartak Stadium; Attendance: 8,000; Referee: Yuri Klyuchnikov

=== UEFA Intertoto Cup ===
==== Qualifying rounds ====
7 July 2007 Second Round 1st leg	Zalaegerszegi (Hungary)	0 – 3	(Russia) Rubin Kazan	Zalaegerszeg, Hungary
21:30 MSK (UTC+3)	Botiș (yellow card) 20'; Polgár (yellow card) 33'; Molnár (yellow card) 44'; Lipčák (red card) 78'		Volkov 21', 66', 80' (pen.)	Stadium: ZTE Arena; Attendance: 5,500; Referee: Robert Schörgenhofer (Austria)

14 July 2007 Second Round 2nd leg	Rubin Kazan (Russia)	2 – 0 (5 – 0 agg.)	(Hungary) Zalaegerszegi	Kazan, Russia
19:00 MSK (UTC+3)	Volkov 37' (pen.); Sibaya (yellow card) 44'; Jean 67'		Z.Tóth (yellow card) 30'; P.Máté (yellow card) 51'; Polgár (yellow card) 60'	Stadium: Central Stadium; Attendance: 10,000; Referee: Augustus Constantin (Romania)

21 July 2007 Third Round 1st leg	Rapid Vienna (Austria)	1 – 3	(Russia) Rubin Kazan	Vienna, Austria
21:45 MSK (UTC+3)	Hofmann 70', 90+3'; Bilić 80' (pen.)		Jean (yellow card) 27'; Ryazantsev 30'; Baýramow (yellow card) 31'; Vasilyev (yellow card) 54'; Gabriel (red card) 73'; Salukvadze (red card) 79'; Volkov (yellow card) 80'	Stadium: Gerhard Hanappi Stadium; Attendance: 10,000; Referee: David McKeon (Republic of Ireland)

29 July 2007 Third Round 2nd leg	Rubin Kazan (Russia)	0 – 0 (1 – 3 agg.)	(Austria) Rapid Vienna	Kazan, Russia
19:00 MSK (UTC+3)	Gațcan (yellow card) 25'; Sibaya (red card) 66'	Report	Dober (yellow card) 29'; Patocka (yellow card) 90+1'	Stadium: Central Stadium; Attendance: 19,000; Referee: Stefan Johannesson (Sweden)

== Squad statistics ==
As of match played 11 November 2007

=== Appearances and goals ===
No.	Pos	Nat	Player	Total		Premier League		2006–07 Russian Cup		2007–08 Russian Cup		2007 UEFA Intertoto Cup	
No.	Pos	Nat	Player	Apps	Goals	Apps	Goals	Apps	Goals	Apps	Goals	Apps	Goals
1	GK	(Latvia) LVA	Aleksandrs Koliņko	35	0	27	0	2	0	1+1	0	4	0
2	DF	(Croatia) CRO	Stjepan Tomas	11	0	11	0	0	0	0	0	0	0
3	DF	(Brazil) BRA	Calisto	4	0	1+2	0	0	0	1	0	0	0
4	DF	(Brazil) BRA	Jean	23	3	15+4	2	0	0	0	0	3+1	1
5	DF	(Uzbekistan) UZB	Andrei Fyodorov	16	0	9+2	0	1	0	1	0	2+1	0
6	MF	(South Africa) RSA	MacBeth Sibaya	31	0	22+2	0	1	0	2	0	4	0
7	FW	(Brazil) BRA	Jaílson	9	0	2+5	0	1+1	0	0	0	0	0
8	MF	(Russia) RUS	Pyotr Gitselov	12	0	5+4	0	0+1	0	0+1	0	0+1	0
9	DF	(Georgia (country)) GEO	Lasha Salukvadze	19	1	15	1	1	0	1	0	2	0
10	FW	(Jamaica) JAM	Damani Ralph	1	0	0+1	0	0	0	0	0	0	0
11	MF	(Russia) RUS	Vitali Volkov	28	6	19+3	1	1	0	1	1	4	4
14	MF	(South Korea) KOR	Kang Sun-kyu	2	0	0	0	1+1	0	0	0	0	0
15	MF	(Russia) RUS	Aleksandr Ryazantsev	24	6	17+1	5	1	0	1	0	4	1
16	MF	(Ecuador) ECU	Christian Noboa	20	1	9+5	1	1+1	0	0+1	0	2+1	0
18	MF	(Serbia) SRB	Branimir Petrović	6	1	1+5	1	0	0	0	0	0	0
19	MF	(Tunisia) TUN	Selim Benachour	12	0	6+4	0	1	0	1	0	0	0
20	MF	(Romania) ROU	Gabriel Giurgiu	4	0	2+2	0	0	0	0	0	0	0
21	DF	(Russia) RUS	Mikhail Sinyov	26	0	19	0	2	0	1	0	4	0
22	MF	(Russia) RUS	Sergei Budylin	27	3	24	3	1	0	0	0	2	0
23	MF	(Russia) RUS	Yevgeni Balyaikin	4	0	0+4	0	0	0	0	0	0	0
26	MF	(Moldova) MDA	Alexandru Gațcan	24	2	18+1	1	0+1	0	2	1	2	0
27	FW	(Serbia) SRB	Veljko Paunović	18	2	12+4	1	1	0	1	1	0	0
28	DF	(Russia) RUS	Sergei Nesterenko	2	0	0	0	0	0	1	0	0+1	0
29	GK	(Georgia (country)) GEO	Nukri Revishvili	2	0	2	0	0	0	0	0	0	0
31	DF	(Brazil) BRA	Gabriel	26	5	20	4	2	1	1	0	3	0
32	FW	(Turkmenistan) TKM	Wladimir Baýramow	28	4	15+8	4	0	0	1	0	4	0
41	MF	(Russia) RUS	Andrei Kireyev	7	0	2+1	0	0	0	1+1	0	0+2	0
42	DF	(Russia) RUS	Mikhail Bagayev	1	0	0	0	0	0	1	0	0	0
44	DF	(Russia) RUS	Igor Klimov	1	0	0	0	0	0	1	0	0	0
49	MF	(Uzbekistan) UZB	Vagiz Galiulin	1	0	0	0	0	0	0+1	0	0	0
53	DF	(Russia) RUS	Sergei Golyatkin	6	0	6	0	0	0	0	0	0	0
54	FW	(Russia) RUS	Vladimir Dyadyun	6	1	2+3	1	0	0	1	0	0	0
77	MF	(Russia) RUS	Ansar Ayupov	18	1	8+6	0	1	0	1	1	0+2	0
79	GK	(Turkmenistan) TKM	Pavel Kharchik	2	0	1	0	0	0	1	0	0	0
98	MF	(Russia) RUS	Dmitri Vasilyev	20	0	16	0	0	0	0	0	4	0
99	FW	(Turkey) TUR	Hasan Kabze	11	4	11	4	0	0	0	0	0	0
Players away from the club on loan:
20	MF	(Portugal) POR	Fábio	9	0	2+4	0	2	0	0	0	0+1	0
46	FW	(Russia) RUS	Aleksandr Yarkin	8	0	0+4	0	0+1	0	0+1	0	0+2	0
Players who appeared for Rubin Kazan but left during the season:
17	DF	(Russia) RUS	Lenar Gilmullin	13	1	11	1	2	0	0	0	0	0
18	MF	(Russia) RUS	Dzhambulad Bazayev	3	0	0+3	0	0	0	0	0	0	0

=== Goal scorers ===
Place	Position	Nation	Number	Name	Premier League	2006–07 Russian Cup	2007–08 Russian Cup	2007 UEFA Intertoto Cup	Total
1	MF	(Russia)	15	Aleksandr Ryazantsev	5	0	0	1	6
1	MF	(Russia)	11	Vitali Volkov	1	0	1	4	6
3	DF	(Brazil)	31	Gabriel	4	1	0	0	5
4	FW	(Turkmenistan)	32	Wladimir Baýramow	4	0	0	0	4
4	FW	(Turkey)	99	Hasan Kabze	4	0	0	0	4
6	MF	(Russia)	22	Sergei Budylin	3	0	0	0	3
6	DF	(Brazil)	4	Jean	2	0	0	1	3
8	MF	(Moldova)	26	Alexandru Gațcan	1	0	1	0	2
8	FW	(Serbia)	27	Veljko Paunović	1	0	1	0	2
9	DF	(Russia)	17	Lenar Gilmullin	1	0	0	0	1
9	FW	(Russia)	46	Aleksandr Yarkin	1	0	0	0	1
9	DF	(Georgia (country))	9	Lasha Salukvadze	1	0	0	0	1
9	MF	(Ecuador)	16	Christian Noboa	1	0	0	0	1
9	MF	(Serbia)	18	Branimir Petrović	1	0	0	0	1
9	FW	(Russia)	54	Vladimir Dyadyun	1	0	0	0	1
9	MF	(Russia)	77	Ansar Ayupov	0	0	1	0	1
Total					31	1	4	6	42

=== Disciplinary record ===
Number	Nation	Position	Name	Premier League		2006–07 Russian Cup		2007–08 Russian Cup		2007 UEFA Intertoto Cup		Total	
Number	Nation	Position	Name	Booked	Sent off (straight red)	Booked	Sent off (straight red)	Booked	Sent off (straight red)	Booked	Sent off (straight red)	Booked	Sent off (straight red)
2	(Croatia)	DF	Stjepan Tomas	2	0	0	0	0	0	0	0	2	0
3	(Brazil)	DF	Calisto	1	0	0	0	0	0	0	0	1	0
4	(Brazil)	MF	Jean	10	1	0	0	0	0	1	0	11	1
5	(Uzbekistan)	DF	Andrei Fyodorov	2	0	1	0	1	0	0	0	4	0
6	(South Africa)	MF	MacBeth Sibaya	4	1	0	0	0	0	1	1	5	2
8	(Russia)	MF	Pyotr Gitselov	0	0	0	0	1	0	0	0	1	0
9	(Georgia (country))	DF	Lasha Salukvadze	0	0	0	0	0	0	0	1	0	1
11	(Russia)	MF	Vitali Volkov	4	0	0	0	0	0	1	0	5	0
15	(Russia)	MF	Aleksandr Ryazantsev	2	0	0	0	0	0	0	0	2	0
16	(Ecuador)	MF	Christian Noboa	4	0	0	0	0	0	0	0	4	0
18	(Serbia)	MF	Branimir Petrović	2	0	0	0	0	0	0	0	2	0
19	(Tunisia)	MF	Selim Benachour	2	0	1	0	0	0	0	0	3	0
21	(Russia)	DF	Mikhail Sinyov	1	0	1	0	0	0	0	0	2	0
22	(Russia)	MF	Sergei Budylin	2	0	0	0	0	0	0	0	2	0
26	(Moldova)	MF	Alexandru Gațcan	9	0	0	0	0	0	1	0	10	0
27	(Serbia)	FW	Veljko Paunović	2	0	0	0	0	0	0	0	2	0
31	(Brazil)	DF	Gabriel	8	0	1	0	0	0	0	1	9	1
32	(Turkmenistan)	FW	Wladimir Baýramow	4	0	0	0	0	0	1	0	5	0
42	(Russia)	MF	Andrei Kireyev	1	0	0	0	0	0	0	0	1	0
54	(Russia)	FW	Vladimir Dyadyun	3	0	0	0	0	0	0	0	3	0
77	(Russia)	MF	Ansar Ayupov	3	0	0	0	0	0	0	0	3	0
98	(Russia)	MF	Dmitri Vasilyev	6	1	0	0	0	0	1	0	7	1
99	(Turkey)	FW	Hasan Kabze	1	0	0	0	0	0	0	0	1	0
Players away on loan:
20	(Portugal)	MF	Fábio	2	1	1	0	0	0	0	0	3	1
46	(Russia)	FW	Aleksandr Yarkin	1	0	0	0	1	0	0	0	2	0
Players who left Rubin Kazan during the season:
17	(Russia)	DF	Lenar Gilmullin	3	0	1	0	0	0	0	0	4	0
Total				79	4	6	0	3	0	6	3	97	4
