= Wladimir Baýramow =

Turkmen footballer (born 1980)

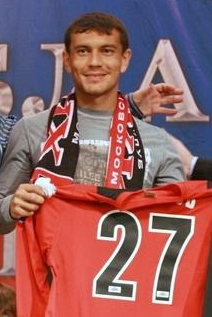
- Baýramow with Khimki in 2008

Personal information
- Birth name: Vladimir Karajayevich Bayramov
- Date of birth: 2 August 1980 (age 46)
- Place of birth: Ashkhabad, Turkmen SSR, USSR (now Ashgabat, Turkmenistan)
- Height: 1.81 m (5 ft 11 1/2 in)
- Position: Forward

Team information
- Current team: FK Arkadag (team manager)

Senior career*
Years	Team	Apps	(Gls)
1998	FK Köpetdag Aşgabat		
1999	Zhenis Astana	21	(6)
2000	Access Petropavlovsk	24	(7)
2001	Kristall Smolensk	15	(1)
2002	Metallurg Krasnoyarsk	20	(1)
2003–2007	Rubin Kazan	83	(15)
2003	→ Terek Grozny (loan)	20	(8)
2008	Khimki	15	(0)
2009	→ Tobol (loan)	22	(20)
2011	Kairat	12	(1)
2012	Ahal		
2013	Nebitçi FT		

International career
2000–2013	Turkmenistan	35	(16)

Managerial career
- 2023–2024: FK Arkadag (head coach)
- * Club domestic league appearances and goals

Wladimir Karajaýewiç Baýramow (Russian: Владимир Караджаевич Байрамов; born 2 August 1980) is a Turkmen professional football manager and a former international forward.

== Biography ==
Wladimir was born in Ashgabat. He began playing football aged 8 under Sergeý Kazankow. He studied at the Institute of Sports and Tourism of Turkmenistan. His younger brother Nazar Baýramow is a former professional footballer.

== Club career ==
Professional football career began at age 17, in 1997–1999 played for Köpetdag Aşgabat.

Then he moved to Kazakhstan. 1999–2000 season played for teams Zhenis Astana and Access Petropavlovsk. The second half of the 2001 season he spent in Russian FC Kristall Smolensk. In 2002, he played with FC Metallurg Krasnoyarsk for the year.

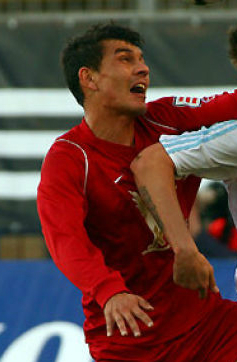
Wladimir Baýramow in action for FC Rubin Kazan

The new season started in FC Rubin Kazan. He failed to gain a foothold in the first team of Rubin, mostly played the cup matches. In the summer of 2003, he joined FC Terek on loan until the end of the 2003 season. He debuted on a match with FC Baltika Kaliningrad, coming on as a second-half substitute. Terek won 1–0. For the club Bayramov played 20 official matches, scoring 8 goals. Terek won the Russian Cup.

In December 2007 Bayramov signed 3 years contract with FC Khimki. For the club Bayramov spent 15 official matches in the Championship of Russia and did not score any goals. In winter of 2009, FC Tobol officially announced that Vladimir Bayramov joined the club on loan. In 2009, Bayramov was the best scorer of Kazakhstan, scoring 20 goals in a season. In December 2009 he left Khimki.

In 2011 moved to FC Kairat. In 2012 he played for the Turkmen club FC Ahal. Since 2013, he played for FC Balkan. In 2013 with FC Balkan he won the AFC President's Cup 2013 in Malaysia.

== International career ==
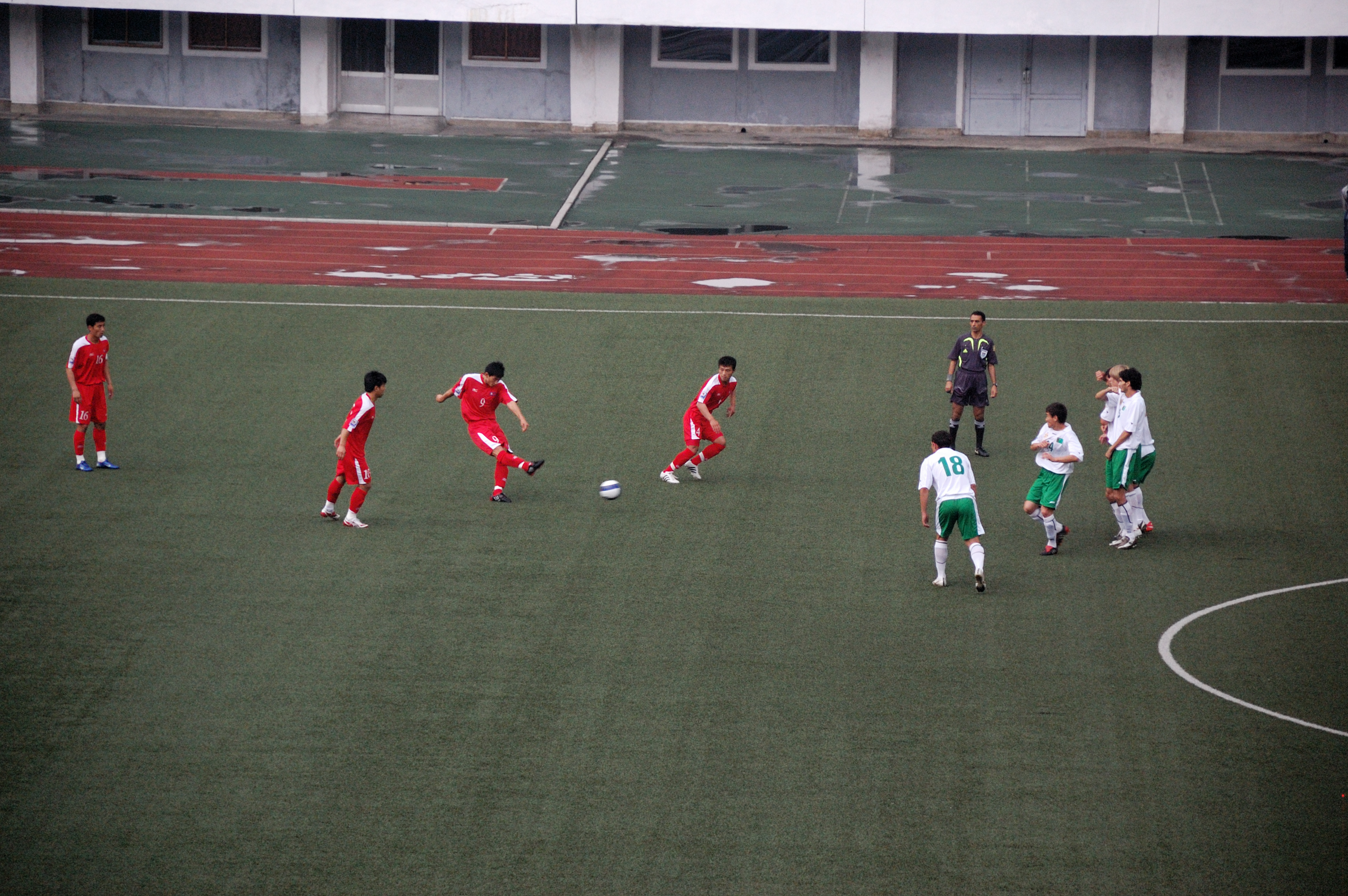
Baýramow playing for Turkmenistan (No. 18)

Baýramow made his international debut for the Turkmenistan national team in 2000 and took part in the 2004 Asian Cup in China.

== Managerial career ==
After his retirement, Baýramow began coaching the Youth Sports School of the Vakhitovsky district (Kazan, Russia).

In November 2023, he was appointed as manager of the Ýokary Liga club FK Arkadag. In his first month, he won the 2023 Ýokary Liga.

He led Arkadag to the title again in the 2024 Ýokary Liga. On 4 December 2024, he sealed the double for the club by winning the 2024 Turkmenistan Super Cup. On 23 December 2024, FK Arkadag secured treble by winning the 2024 Turkmenistan Cup. With his guidance, Arkadag entered the AFC Challenge League quarter-finals.

== Managerial statistics ==
Managerial record by team and tenure
Team	Nat	From	To	Record							
Team	Nat	From	To	G	W	D	L	GF	GA	GD	Win %
Arkadag	(Turkmenistan)	10 October 2023	2024	49	48	0	1	213	32	+181	97.96
Career total				49	48	0	1	213	32	+181	97.96

== Achievements ==
=== Player ===
Terek

- Russian Cup: 2003–04

Balkan

- AFC President's Cup: 2013

=== Manager ===
Arkadag

- Ýokary Liga
  - Champion (2): 2023, 2024
- Turkmenistan Cup
  - Champion (2): 2023, 2024
- Turkmenistan Super Cup
  - Champion (1): 2024

Individual Ýokary Liga Manager of the Season: 2024

=== State medals ===
- Medal For the love of the Fatherland (2025)

== Career stats ==
=== Club ===
As of 26 November 2019

Club	Season	League			National Cup		Continental		Other		Total	
Club	Season	Division	Apps	Goals	Apps	Goals	Apps	Goals	Apps	Goals	Apps	Goals
Köpetdag Aşgabat	1998–99	Ýokary Liga					-					
Zhenis Astana	1999	Kazakhstan Premier League	21	6			-				21	6
Access-Golden Grain	2000	Kazakhstan Premier League	24	7			-				24	7
Nisa Aşgabat	2001	Ýokary Liga					-					
Kristall Smolensk	2001	Russian First Division	15	1			-				15	1
Metallurg Krasnoyarsk	2002	Russian First Division	20	1			-				20	1
Rubin Kazan	2003	Russian Premier League	1	0	0	0	-				1	0
Rubin Kazan	2004	Russian Premier League	13	3	2	0	1	0	-		16	3
Rubin Kazan	2005	Russian Premier League	21	6	2	1	-				23	7
Rubin Kazan	2006	Russian Premier League	25	2	6	0	-				31	2
Rubin Kazan	2007	Russian Premier League	23	4	1	0	-				24	4
Rubin Kazan	Ttotal		83	15	11	1	1	0	-	-	95	16
Terek Grozny (loan)	2003	Russian First Division	20	8	1	0	-				21	8
Khimki	2008	Russian Premier League	15	0	1	0	-				16	0
Khimki	2009	Russian Premier League	0	0	0	0	-				0	0
Khimki	Ttotal		15	0	1	0	-	-	-	-	16	0
Tobol (loan)	2009	Kazakhstan Premier League	22	20			-				22	20
Kairat	2011	Kazakhstan Premier League	12	1	2	1	-				14	2
Ahal	2012	Ýokary Liga					-					
Nebitçi	2013	Ýokary Liga					-					
Career total			232	59	15	2	1	0	-	-	248	61

=== International ===
Turkmenistan national team
Year	Apps	Goals
2000	3	5
2001	6	2
2002	0	0
2003	6	1
2004	9	4
2005	0	0
2006	0	0
2007	3	1
2008	5	0
2009	0	0
2010	0	0
2011	0	0
2012	1	1
2013	2	2
Total	35	16

Statistics accurate as of match played 26 March 2013

=== International goals ===
Statistics accurate as of match played 26 March 2013

Scores and results list Turkmenistan's goal tally first.

#	Date	Venue	Opponent	Score	Result	Competition
1.	12 February 2000	Mohammed Al-Hamad Stadium, Hawally, Kuwait	Yemen	1–0	1–0	2000 AFC Asian Cup Qualifier
2.	14 February 2000	Mohammed Al-Hamad Stadium, Hawally, Kuwait	Nepal	2–0	5–0	2000 AFC Asian Cup Qualifier
3.	16 February 2000	Mohammed Al-Hamad Stadium, Hawally, Kuwait	Bhutan	2–0	8–0	2000 AFC Asian Cup Qualifier
4.	16 February 2000	Mohammed Al-Hamad Stadium, Hawally, Kuwait	Bhutan	4–0	8–0	2000 AFC Asian Cup Qualifier
5.	16 February 2000	Mohammed Al-Hamad Stadium, Hawally, Kuwait	Bhutan	7–0	8–0	2000 AFC Asian Cup Qualifier
6.	3 May 2001	Amman International Stadium, Amman, Jordan	Uzbekistan	1–2	2–5	2002 FIFA World Cup Qualifier
7.	3 May 2001	Amman International Stadium, Amman, Jordan	Uzbekistan	2–2	2–5	2002 FIFA World Cup Qualifier
8.	19 October 2003	Saparmurat Turkmenbashi Olympic Stadium, Ashgabat, Turkmenistan	United Arab Emirates	1–0	1–0	2004 AFC Asian Cup Qualifier
9.	18 February 2004	Köpetdag Stadium, Ashgabat, Turkmenistan	Sri Lanka	2–0	2–0	2004 AFC Asian Cup Qualifier
10.	31 March 2004	Saparmurat Turkmenbashi Olympic Stadium, Ashgabat, Turkmenistan	Indonesia	1–0	3–1	2006 FIFA World Cup Qualifier
11.	31 March 2004	Saparmurat Turkmenbashi Olympic Stadium, Ashgabat, Turkmenistan	Indonesia	3–1	3–1	2006 FIFA World Cup Qualifier
12.	22 July 2004	Chengdu Longquanyi Football Stadium, Chengdu, China	Iraq	1–1	2–3	2004 AFC Asian Cup
13.	18 November 2007	Saparmurat Turkmenbashi Olympic Stadium, Ashgabat, Turkmenistan	Hong Kong	2–0	3–0	2010 FIFA World Cup Qualifier
14.	24 October 2012	Thống Nhất Stadium, Ho Chi Minh City, Vietnam	Vietnam	1–0	1–0	Friendly
15.	22 March 2013	Rizal Memorial Stadium, Manila, Philippines	Cambodia	2–0	7–0	2014 AFC Challenge Cup qualification
16.	22 March 2013	Rizal Memorial Stadium, Manila, Philippines	Cambodia	3–0	7–0	2014 AFC Challenge Cup qualification
