= Javier León =

Javier León may refer to:

- Javier León (wrestler) (born 1953), Peruvian wrestler
- Javier León (footballer) (born 1982), Argentine footballer
