= Ganiyev =

Ganiyev or Ganiev (Cyrillic: Ганиев, Azerbaijani: Qəniyev, Uzbek: Gʻaniyev) is an Asian masculine surname, its feminine counterpart is Ganiyeva or Ganieva. It may refer to

- Alisa Ganieva (born 1985), Russian novelist
- Azizjon Ganiev (born 1998), Uzbek football midfielder
- Elyor Ganiyev (born 1960), Minister of Foreign Economic Affairs of Uzbekistan
- Irek Ganiyev (born 1986), Russian football player
- Luiza Ganieva (born 1995), Uzbekistani rhythmic gymnast
- Ramil Ganiyev (born 1968), Uzbekistani decathlete
- Ziba Ganiyeva (1923–2010), Azerbaijani philologist and World War II sniper
