= Yuri Budylin =

Russian footballer

Personal information
- Full name: Yuri Vladimirovich Budylin
- Date of birth: 8 January 1982 (age 44)
- Place of birth: Nizhnekamsk, Russian SFSR
- Height: 1.85 m (6 ft 1 in)
- Positions: Forward; midfielder

Senior career*
Years	Team	Apps	(Gls)
1999–2005	FC Neftekhimik Nizhnekamsk	201	(31)
2006–2007	FC Nosta Novotroitsk	20	(4)
2007–2008	FC Alnas Almetyevsk	48	(13)
2009–2012	FC Neftekhimik Nizhnekamsk	90	(31)
2012–2013	FC Gazovik Orenburg	16	(1)
- * Club domestic league appearances and goals

Yuri Vladimirovich Budylin (Russian: Юрий Владимирович Будылин; born 8 January 1982) is a former Russian professional football player.

== Club career ==
He played 4 seasons in the Russian Football National League for FC Neftekhimik Nizhnekamsk.

== Personal life ==
His younger brother Sergei Budylin was also a footballer.
