= Kang Sun-kyu =

South Korean footballer

Kang Sun-Kyu
Personal information
- Date of birth: 20 April 1986 (age 40)
- Place of birth: Seoul, South Korea
- Height: 1.80 m (5 ft 11 in)
- Position: Midfielder

Team information
- Current team: Younghee FC

Youth career
- –2004: Eonnam High School
- 2005: Konkuk University

Senior career*
Years	Team	Apps	(Gls)
2006–2007	Rubin Kazan	0	(0)
2008–2009	Daejeon Citizen	11	(0)
2010	Gangwon	5	(0)
2013	Cheonan City		
2017	Uijeongbu		
2017–	Younghee FC		
- * Club domestic league appearances and goals as of 7 November 2010

- Kang Sun-kyu
- Hangul: 강선규
- Hanja: 康善圭
- RR: Gang Seongyu
- MR: Kang Sŏn'gyu

Kang Sun-Kyu (Korean: 강선규; born 20 April 1986) is a South Korean footballer who plays for Younghee FC.

== Career ==
Kang previously played for Rubin Kazan in the Russian Premier League and Daejeon Citizen and Gangwon FC in the K-League. In his two years with Rubin, he never played in a league game, appearing only for the reserves, but he did participate in two Russian Cup games.
