= Lenar Gilmullin =

Russian footballer

Personal information
- Full name: Lenar Gilmullin
- Date of birth: June 17, 1985
- Place of birth: Kazan, Soviet Union
- Date of death: June 22, 2007 (aged 22)
- Place of death: Kazan, Russia
- Height: 5 ft 11 in (1.80 m)
- Position: Defender

Youth career
- 1992–2003: FC Rubin Kazan

Senior career*
Years	Team	Apps	(Gls)
2003–2007	FC Rubin Kazan	29	(2)

International career
2005–2007	Russia Under-21	6	(0)
- * Club domestic league appearances and goals

Lenar Ildusovich Gilmullin (Russian: Ленар Ильдусович Гильмуллин, Tatar: Ленар Илдус улы Гыйльмуллин; 17 June 1985 – 22 June 2007) was a Russian football full-back of Tatar origin who played for FC Rubin Kazan and the Russia Under-21 team.

== Death ==
On the 17 to 18 June 2007 night, he was injured in a motorcycle accident following his birthday party. After spending several days in coma, he died on 22 June, five days after his 22nd birthday.
