= Sergei Budylin =

Russian footballer

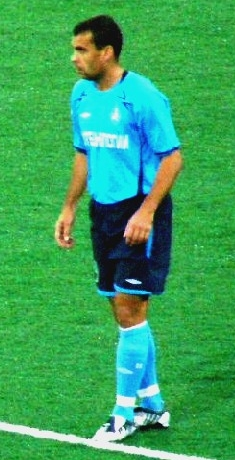

Personal information
- Full name: Sergei Vladimirovich Budylin
- Date of birth: 31 October 1979 (age 47)
- Place of birth: Nizhnekamsk, Soviet Union
- Height: 1.75 m (5 ft 9 in)
- Position: Midfielder

Senior career*
Years	Team	Apps	(Gls)
1997–2001	FC Neftekhimik Nizhnekamsk	126	(21)
2002–2006	FC Torpedo Moscow	125	(18)
2007	FC Rubin Kazan	24	(3)
2008–2010	FC Krylia Sovetov Samara	55	(3)
2011–2012	FC KAMAZ Naberezhnye Chelny	31	(4)
2012–2013	FC Gazovik Orenburg	19	(4)
Total		380	(53)
- * Club domestic league appearances and goals

Sergei Vladimirovich Budylin (Russian: Серге́й Владимирович Будылин; born 31 October 1979) is a former Russian footballer.

He is a brother of Yuri Budylin.
