= Vyacheslav Sobolev =

Kazakhstani footballer

Personal information
- Full name: Vyacheslav Vladimirovich Sobolev
- Date of birth: 13 October 1984 (age 42)
- Place of birth: Almaty, Kazakhstan
- Height: 1.78 m (5 ft 10 in)
- Position: Right-back

Senior career*
Years	Team	Apps	(Gls)
2001	FC Vostok	14	(0)
2002–2003	FC Atyrau	34	(0)
2005–2007	FC Taraz	96	(1)
2008–2009	Irtysh Pavlodar	37	(0)
2010	FC Kairat	27	(0)
2011–2012	FC Taraz	32	(0)
2013	FC Vostok	18	(0)
2014	FC Astana-1964	17	(0)
2015	FC Caspiy	13	(0)
Total		288	(1)

International career
2004–2005	Kazakhstan U21	3	(0)
2006	Kazakhstan	2	(0)
- * Club domestic league appearances and goals

Vyacheslav Sobolev (born 13 October 1984) is a Kazakhstan former professional footballer who played as a right-back. He played for a number of clubs in Kazakhstan and made two appearances for the Kazakhstan national team.
