= Jean (footballer, born 1979) =

Brazilian footballer

Personal information
- Full name: Jean Ferreira Narde
- Date of birth: 18 November 1979 (age 46)
- Place of birth: Feira de Santana, Brazil
- Height: 1.86 m (6 ft 1 in)
- Position: Centre back

Youth career
- São Paulo

Senior career*
Years	Team	Apps	(Gls)
1998–2003	São Paulo	87	(5)
2003–2008	Saturn Ramenskoye	53	(5)
2006	→ Dynamo Moscow (loan)	22	(0)
2007	→ Rubin Kazan (loan)	19	(2)
2008	→ Grêmio (loan)	24	(1)
2009	Corinthians	13	(3)
2009–2010	FC Moscow	0	(0)
2010–2011	Flamengo	18	(1)
2011	Vitória	13	(2)
2012	Guangdong Sunray Cave	27	(1)
2013	Paysandu	3	(0)
2014	São José	7	(0)
- * Club domestic league appearances and goals

Jean Ferreira Narde commonly known as Jean (born 18 November 1979) is a Brazilian former footballer.

== Club career ==
Jean spend his early years at São Paulo, when he plays from 1998 to 2003. He move to Russia, when he played for FC Saturn, Dynamo Moscow and Rubin Kazan. Jean returned to Brazil in 2008 loaned to Grêmio. After spend most part of the season in the substitutes, Jean leave the club in December and signed a two-year contract with Série B champions Corinthians.

=== Flamengo career statistics ===
(Correct as of August 3, 2011)

Club	Season	Brazilian Série A		Copa do Brasil		Copa Libertadores		Copa Sudamericana		Carioca League		Total	
Club	Season	Apps	Goals	Apps	Goals	Apps	Goals	Apps	Goals	Apps	Goals	Apps	Goals
Flamengo	2010	15	1	-	-	-	-	-	-	-	-	15	1
Flamengo	2011	3	0	-	-	-	-	-	-	4	1	7	1
Flamengo	Total	18	1	0	0	0	0	0	0	4	1	22	2

according to combined sources on the Flamengo official website and Flaestatística.

== Honours ==
- São Paulo
  - São Paulo State League: 1998, 2000
  - Torneio Rio-São Paulo: 1998, 2002
- Corinthians
  - São Paulo State League: 2009
- Flamengo
  - Taça Guanabara: 2011
  - Taça Rio: 2011
  - Rio de Janeiro State League: 2011
