= Yevgeni Klimov =

Kazakhstani footballer

Personal information
- Full name: Yevgeni Yuryevich Klimov
- Date of birth: 21 January 1985 (age 41)
- Height: 1.77 m (5 ft 9 1/2 in)
- Position: Defender

Senior career*
Years	Team	Apps	(Gls)
2002–2005	CSKA Moscow	0	(0)
2005–2007	Alma-Ata	57	(1)
2008	Dynamo Stavropol	28	(0)
2009	Stavropolye-2009	26	(0)
2010	Vostok	7	(0)
2011	Kairat	18	(0)
2012	Bayterek	23	(0)
2013–2014	Caspiy	49	(1)
2015	Bayterek	15	(0)

International career
2006	Kazakhstan	1	(0)
- * Club domestic league appearances and goals

Yevgeni Yuryevich Klimov (Russian: Евгений Юрьевич Климов; born 21 January 1985) is a Kazakhstani former professional footballer. He also holds Russian citizenship.

== Career statistics ==
=== International ===
Kazakhstan
Year	Apps	Goals
2006	1	0
Total	1	0

Statistics accurate as of match played 29 February 2012
