= 2024 Turkmenistan Super Cup =

- Event: Turkmenistan Super Cup
Arkadag	Ahal
3	1
- Date: 4 December 2024
- Venue: Sport Toplumy, Balkanabat, Balkan Region
- Referee: Arslan Goshshanov

The 2024 Turkmenistan Super Cup (Turkmen: Türkmenistanyň Naýbaşy Kubogy 2024) was the 19th Turkmenistan Super Cup, an annual Turkmen football match played between the winners of the previous season's Ýokary Liga and Turkmenistan Cup. The match was contested by 2023 League and Cup champions Arkadag, and the Cup runners-up Ahal.

== Background ==
The 19th edition of the Turkmenistan Super Cup was originally scheduled to take place on 28 September 2024. On 2 December 2024, the Turkmenistan Football Federation confirmed that the game would take place in Balkanabat on 4 December 2024.

It was played between the 2023 League and Cup Champions Arkadag (the club claimed the domestic double in their first season of operation), and the Cup runners-up Ahal, with Arslan Goshshanov designated as the referee.

Team	Qualification	Previous participations (bold indicates winners)
FC Ahal	Runners-up of 2023 Turkmenistan Cup	3 (**2014**, 2017, 2019)
Arkadag	Winners of the 2023 Ýokary Liga and 2023 Turkmenistan Cup	0

== Match ==
=== Summary ===
Arkadag won their first Turkmenistan Super Cup thanks to three first half goals, two from Shamamed Khydyrov and one from Shanazar Tirkishov, before Ahal pulled one goal back through Islam Annamuradov in the second half.

=== Details ===
4 December 2024
14:00 (UTC+5)

Arkadag	3–1	Ahal
Khydyrov 14', 29'; Tirkishov 22'	Report	Annamuradov 75'

Sport Toplumy, Balkanabat
Referee: Arslan Goshshanov

Man of the Match:
Assistant referees:
Shageldy Khydyrov (Balkanabat)
Ezizmurad Annamuradov (Balkanabat)
Fourth official:
Jumamurad Jumamuradov (Ashgabat)

**Match rules**

- 90 minutes
- Penalty shoot-out if scores level
- Seven named substitutes
- Maximum of six substitutions

== Aftermath ==
In the weeks following the match, the 2024 season was concluded with an identical outcome to 2023: Arkadag won both the league and the cup, defeating Ahal in the cup final. The next Super Cup would therefore involve the same participants, taking place at some point in 2025.

== See also ==
- 2023 Ýokary Liga
- 2023 Turkmenistan Cup
- 2024 Ýokary Liga
- 2024 Turkmenistan Cup
