= Sergei Golyatkin =

Russian footballer

Personal information
- Full name: Sergei Alekseyevich Golyatkin
- Date of birth: 4 May 1988 (age 38)
- Place of birth: Lukhovitsy, Russian SFSR
- Height: 1.80 m (5 ft 11 in)
- Position: Defender

Youth career
- 1998–2005: CSKA Moscow

Senior career*
Years	Team	Apps	(Gls)
2006–2007	Rubin Kazan	6	(0)
2008	→ Vityaz Podolsk (loan)	29	(1)
2009–2010	Tom Tomsk	1	(0)
2009	→ Chernomorets Novorossiysk (loan)	9	(1)
2010	→ SKA-Energiya Khabarovsk (loan)	12	(0)
2011–2012	SKA-Energiya Khabarovsk	23	(1)
2012	Polonia Warsaw	1	(0)
2013	SKA-Energiya Khabarovsk	4	(0)
2013–2015	Tyumen	41	(2)
2015	Neftekhimik Nizhnekamsk	5	(0)
2016	Granit Mikashevichi	10	(0)
2016	Slutsk	13	(1)

International career
2005–2006	Russia U18	10	(0)
2006–2007	Russia U19	8	(1)
- * Club domestic league appearances and goals

Sergei Alekseyevich Golyatkin (Russian: Серге́й Алексеевич Голяткин; born 4 May 1988) is a Russian former professional footballer who played as a defender.

He made his debut in the Russian Premier League in 2007 for FC Rubin Kazan.
