= Andrei Kireyev =

Russian footballer

Personal information
- Full name: Andrei Igorevich Kireyev
- Date of birth: 6 July 1985 (age 41)
- Place of birth: Ryazan, Russian SFSR
- Height: 1.84 m (6 ft 1/2 in)
- Positions: Defender; midfielder

Youth career
- PFC CSKA Moscow

Senior career*
Years	Team	Apps	(Gls)
2004–2005	FC Nosta Novotroitsk	53	(7)
2006–2007	FC Rubin Kazan	3	(0)
2008	FC Rostov	17	(3)
2008–2009	FC Vityaz Podolsk	36	(1)
2010	FC Avangard Kursk	20	(2)
2011–2014	FC Ufa	65	(4)
2014	FC Fakel Voronezh	9	(1)
2015	FC Syzran-2003	9	(0)
2015–2017	FC SKA-Khabarovsk	50	(3)
2017–2018	FC Rotor Volgograd	24	(1)
2018–2020	FC Neftekhimik Nizhnekamsk	41	(2)
2020	FC Akron Tolyatti	10	(0)
- * Club domestic league appearances and goals

Andrei Igorevich Kireyev (Russian: Андрей Игоревич Киреев; born 6 July 1985) is a Russian former professional footballer.

== Club career ==
He made his debut in the Russian Premier League on 25 July 2007 for FC Rubin Kazan in a game against FC Lokomotiv Moscow. He played 2 games in the UEFA Intertoto Cup 2007 for Rubin.
