= Sergei Krashchenko =

Russian footballer and coach

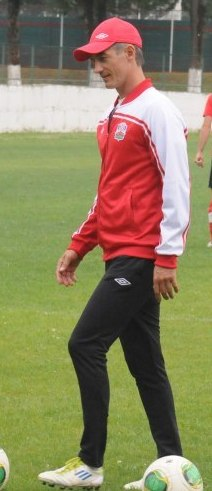
- Sergei Vladimirovich Krashchenko

Personal information
- Full name: Sergei Vladimirovich Krashchenko
- Date of birth: 8 February 1970 (age 56)
- Place of birth: Nalchik, Russian SFSR
- Height: 1.83 m (6 ft 0 in)
- Position: Goalkeeper

Team information
- Current team: FC Dynamo Makhachkala (GK coach)

Senior career*
Years	Team	Apps	(Gls)
1990	PFC Spartak Nalchik	42	(0)
1991	FC Remontnik Prokhladny	4	(0)
1991–1993	PFC Spartak Nalchik	68	(0)
1994–1995	FC Avtozapchast Baksan	66	(0)
1996–2003	PFC Spartak Nalchik	217	(0)
2004	FC Terek Grozny	4	(0)
2005–2008	PFC Spartak Nalchik	9	(0)

Managerial career
- 2010: PFC Spartak Nalchik (GK coach)
- 2011: FC Luch-Energiya Vladivostok (GK coach)
- 2012–2017: PFC Spartak Nalchik (GK coach)
- 2017: FC Luch-Energiya Vladivostok (GK coach)
- 2018–2020: FC Arsenal Tula (GK coach)
- 2020–2022: FC Arsenal Tula (U-19 GK coach)
- 2024–: FC Dynamo Makhachkala (GK coach)
- * Club domestic league appearances and goals

Sergei Vladimirovich Krashchenko (Russian: Серге́й Владимирович Кращенко; born 8 February 1970) is a Russian football coach and a former player. He works as a goalkeepers coach for FC Dynamo Makhachkala.

== Honours ==
- Russian Cup winner: 2003/04.
