= Andrey Travin =

Kazakhstani footballer (born 1979)

Andrei Travin
Personal information
- Full name: Andrei Travin
- Date of birth: 27 April 1979 (age 47)
- Place of birth: Kazakhstan
- Position: Midfielder

Senior career*
Years	Team	Apps	(Gls)
1998–2000	Kairat	36	(3)
2001	Vostok	30	(6)
2002	Zhenis Astana	21	(0)
2003	Tsesna	7	(0)
2005–2008	Alma-Ata	98	(8)
2008	Vostok	5	(0)
2009	Zhetysu	16	(0)
2010	Tobol	8	(0)
2011	Atyrau	28	(2)
2012–2013	Ile-Saulet	50	(1)
2014	Sunkar	22	(0)

International career^{‡}
2005–2009	Kazakhstan	18	(0)
- * Club domestic league appearances and goals as of 12:56, 9 January 2018 (UTC) ‡ National team caps and goals as of 12:56, 9 January 2018 (UTC)

Andrei Travin (born 27 April 1979; also known as Andrey Travin) is a Kazakh midfielder and defender. He plays for FC Zhetysu, as well as the Kazakhstan national football team.

== Career ==
=== Kairat Almaty ===
Travin played for Kairat Almaty from 1998 to 2000, totalling 3 years. In 1998, he scored 2 goals out of 4 games. In 1999, he scored 1 goal out of 20 games, and in 2000, he scored 0 goals out of 12 games. This totals 3 goals in 36 games.

=== Vostok Oskemen ===
In 2001, Travin played for Vostok Oskemen. There, he scored 6 goals out of 30 games.

=== Zhenis Astana ===
Travin played for Zhenis Astana in 2002. There, he scored no goals out of 21 games.

=== Cesna Almaty ===
Travin played for Cesna Almaty in 2003. There, he scored no goals out of 7 games.

=== FC Almaty ===
Andrei Travin currently plays for the club FC Almaty. He has played there from 2004. In 2004, he scored 3 goals out of 31 games. In 2005, Andrei scored 2 goals in 23 games. In 2006 and 2007, he has not played in any games and consequently, has not scored any goals. Andrei Travin scored a total of 5 goals for FC Almaty.

=== National team ===
Andrei Travin has played under the number 6 for the Kazakhstan national football team since 2005.
