= Irek Ganiyev =

Russian footballer

Personal information
- Full name: Irek Kutdusovich Ganiyev
- Date of birth: 16 January 1986 (age 40)
- Place of birth: Kazan, Russian SFSR
- Height: 1.80 m (5 ft 11 in)
- Position: Centre back

Senior career*
Years	Team	Apps	(Gls)
2004–2007	FC Rubin Kazan	0	(0)
2008	FC Rubin-2 Kazan	33	(1)
2009	FC SOYUZ-Gazprom Izhevsk	30	(0)
2010–2011	FC KAMAZ Naberezhnye Chelny	42	(0)
2012–2014	FC Gazovik Orenburg	35	(0)
2014–2016	FC KAMAZ Naberezhnye Chelny	51	(0)
2016–2017	FC Syzran-2003	21	(0)
2017	FC Olimpiyets Nizhny Novgorod	13	(0)
2018	FC Lada Dimitrovgrad (amateur)		
2018–2019	FC Syzran-2003	21	(0)
2019	FC Mashuk-KMV Pyatigorsk	12	(0)
2020	FC Lada Dimitrovgrad	0	(0)
- * Club domestic league appearances and goals

Irek Kutdusovich Ganiyev (Russian: Ирек Кутдусович Ганиев, Tatar: Ирек Котдус улы Ганиев; born 16 January 1986) is a Russian former professional football player.

== Club career ==
He made his Russian Football National League debut for FC KAMAZ Naberezhnye Chelny on 2 May 2010 in a game against FC Kuban Krasnodar.
