= Philip Edeipo =

Nigerian footballer

Personal information
- Full name: Philip Edeipo
- Date of birth: 4 November 1986 (age 39)
- Place of birth: Nigeria
- Height: 1.81 m (5 ft 11 1/2 in)
- Positions: Attacking midfielder; supporting striker

Team information
- Current team: NaF FC Abuja 2016 -2018
- Number: 25

Senior career*
Years	Team	Apps	(Gls)
2005–2007	Bayelsa United	30	(18)
2008	RoPS	30	(12)
2009	Qingdao Hailifeng	21	(10)
2010	Shenyang Dongjin	11	(5)
2011–2013	Kaisar. Myanmar Yadanabor Fc Btv cup 2015	35	(3)

International career^{‡}
- Nigeria U17
- Nigeria U20
- Nigeria U23
- * Club domestic league appearances and goals as of 19 January 2018 ‡ National team caps and goals as of 19 January 2018

Philip Edeipo (born 4 Nov 1986), is a Nigerian footballer, whose last known club was FC Kaisar in Kazakhstan Premier League.

== Career ==
=== Club ===
On 9 April 2008, Edeipo signed for Finnish Veikkausliiga club RoPS.

In 2009, Edeipo moved to China, signing for Qingdao Hailifeng. When Qingdao Hailifeng were banned from football for match-fixing scandal in 2010, Edeipo moved to China League One club Shenyang Dongjin in March 2010.

In 2011, he spent 1 month on trials in Turkey until given a contract to Kazakhstan Premier League.

On 1 April 2012, Edeipo suffered a serious knee injury that during Kaisar's week four match against FC Ordabasy.

=== International ===
In September 2011, Edeipo expressed his interest in representing Kazakhstan, having previously represented Nigeria at U17 and U23 level.
