= Dragan Bogavac =

Montenegrin footballer

Personal information
- Date of birth: 7 April 1980 (age 46)
- Place of birth: Bijelo Polje, SFR Yugoslavia
- Height: 1.69 m (5 ft 7 in)
- Position: Striker

Senior career*
Years	Team	Apps	(Gls)
1996–1999	Brskovo	34	(14)
1999–2001	Rudar Pljevlja	51	(25)
2002–2005	Red Star Belgrade	65	(9)
2005–2007	Wacker Burghausen	62	(18)
2007	TuS Koblenz	12	(3)
2008	Paderborn	10	(2)
2008–2010	Mainz 05	13	(1)
2011	Astana	26	(12)
2012–2014	OFK Beograd	14	(3)
Total		287	(87)

International career
2001	FR Yugoslavia U21	1	(3)
2002	FR Yugoslavia	1	(0)
2007–2008	Montenegro	7	(0)
- * Club domestic league appearances and goals

Dragan Bogavac (Cyrillic: Драган Богавац; born 7 April 1980) is a Montenegrin former professional footballer who played as a striker.

== Club career ==
Bogavac started his career in the Serbia and Montenegro lower leagues with Brskovo and later had three seasons with first league powerhouse Red Star Belgrade, before moving abroad to play in Germany and Kazakhstan.

== International career ==
He made his debut for Serbia and Montenegro in an April 2002 friendly match against Lithuania, his sole game for that team. His debut for Montenegro came in a September 2007 friendly against Sweden and he earned a total of 7 caps, scoring no goals. His final international was a September 2008 World Cup qualification match against Bulgaria.
