= Deyan Hristov =

Bulgarian footballer

Personal information
- Full name: Deyan Borisov Hristov
- Date of birth: 28 February 1983 (age 43)
- Place of birth: Pavlikeni, Bulgaria
- Height: 1.87 m (6 ft 1 1/2 in)
- Position: Forward

Team information
- Current team: Vitosha Bistritsa
- Number: 41

Senior career*
Years	Team	Apps	(Gls)
2002–2003	Etar	?	(?)
2003–2006	Naftex	19	(2)
2006	→ Pomorie (loan)	25	(6)
2006	Chernomorets Burgas	10	(4)
2007	Svetkavitsa	10	(6)
2007–2009	Naftex	54	(40)
2009–2010	Sliven 2000	44	(15)
2011	Kairat	20	(2)
2012	Botev Plovdiv	11	(3)
2012	Montana	11	(3)
2013	Svetkavitsa	7	(3)
2013	Neftochimic 1986	17	(2)
2014	Spartak Varna	11	(6)
2014–2015	Chernomorets Burgas	26	(9)
2015	Vereya	11	(4)
2016	Septemvri Simitli	12	(2)
2016–2017	Sozopol	30	(5)
2017–2018	Lokomotiv GO	30	(9)
2018–2019	Neftochimic	35	(30)
2019–2020	Lokomotiv GO	17	(6)
2020	Vitosha Bistritsa	6	(0)
2020–2022	Sportist Svoge	39	(14)
2022–2023	Vitosha Bistritsa	48	(15)
2023–2024	Minyor Pernik	32	(18)
2024–	Vitosha Bistritsa	37	(28)
- * Club domestic league appearances and goals as of 07:36, 4 August 2025 (UTC)

Deyan Hristov (Bulgarian: Деян Христов; born 28 February 1983) is a Bulgarian football player who plays as a striker for Vitosha Bistritsa.

== Career ==
Hristov joined Botev Plovdiv on 6 December 2011, as a free agent, on a one-and-a-half-year contract. He was released in June 2012. Hristov played for Sozopol for one season but was released in June 2017.

In July 2017, he joined Lokomotiv Gorna Oryahovitsa. He left the club at the end of the 2017–18 season when his contract expired.

On 26 June 2018, Hristov signed with Neftochimic.

== Career stats ==
Season	Club	Country	Level	Apps	Goals
2014–	Chernomorets Burgas	Bulgaria	II	26	9
2014	Spartak Varna	Bulgaria	II	11	6
2013	Neftochimic 1986	Bulgaria	I	17	2
2013	Svetkavitsa	Bulgaria	II	7	3
2012	Montana	Bulgaria	I	11	3
2011–12	Botev Plovdiv	Bulgaria	II	11	3
2011	Kairat	Kazakhstan	I	20	2
2010	Sliven	Bulgaria	I	15	5
2009–10	Sliven	Bulgaria	I	29	10
2008–09	Naftex	Bulgaria	II	27	25
2007–08	Naftex	Bulgaria	II	27	15
2007	Svetkavitsa	Bulgaria	II	10	6
2006	Chernomorets Burgas	Bulgaria	II	10	4
2006	Pomorie	Bulgaria	II	25	6
2005	Naftex	Bulgaria	II	13	1
2004–05	Naftex	Bulgaria	I	20	3
2003–04	Naftex	Bulgaria	I	1	1
2002–03	Etar	Bulgaria	II	?	?
