= Gleb Maltsev =

Kazakhstani footballer

Personal information
- Full name: Gleb Georgievich Maltsev
- Date of birth: March 7, 1988 (age 38)
- Place of birth: Pavlodar, Kazakh SSR
- Height: 1.89 m (6 ft 2 in)
- Position: Striker

Team information
- Current team: FC Ordabasy
- Number: 9

Senior career*
Years	Team	Apps	(Gls)
2006	Kyzylzhar	5	(0)
2006	Energetik-2 Pavlodar	12	(1)
2007	Irtysh-2	4	(2)
2007–2012	Irtysh	99	(28)
2013–	Ordabasy	6	(0)

International career^{‡}
2008	Kazakhstan U-21	2	(0)
2008–2010	Kazakhstan	3	(0)
- * Club domestic league appearances and goals as of May 3, 2013 ‡ National team caps and goals as of September 29, 2010

Gleb Maltsev (born 7 March 1988) is a Kazakhstan footballer currently playing for Kazakhstan Premier League club FC Ordabasy as a forward. He started his career at FC Kyzylzhar.

== Club statistics ==
Last update: 28 October 2012

Season	Team	Country	League	Level	Apps	Goals	Cup	Europe
2006	Kyzylzhar	Kazakhstan	Premier League	1	5	0	2(0)	-
2006	Energetik-2 Pavlodar	Kazakhstan	First Division	2	12	1	-	-
2007	Irtysh Pavlodar	Kazakhstan	Premier League	1	9	1	1(0)	-
2007	Irtysh-2	Kazakhstan	First Division	2	4	2	?(0)	-
2008	Irtysh	Kazakhstan	Premier League	1	21	7	2(1)	-
2009	Irtysh	Kazakhstan	Premier League	1	9	2	3(0)	2(0)
2010	Irtysh	Kazakhstan	Premier League	1	27	9	0(0)	-
2011	Irtysh	Kazakhstan	Premier League	1	24	5	3(1)	4(1)
2012	Irtysh	Kazakhstan	Premier League	1	9	4	2(0)	-
Total					120	31	13(2)	6(1)
