= Yossi Shekel =

Israeli footballer

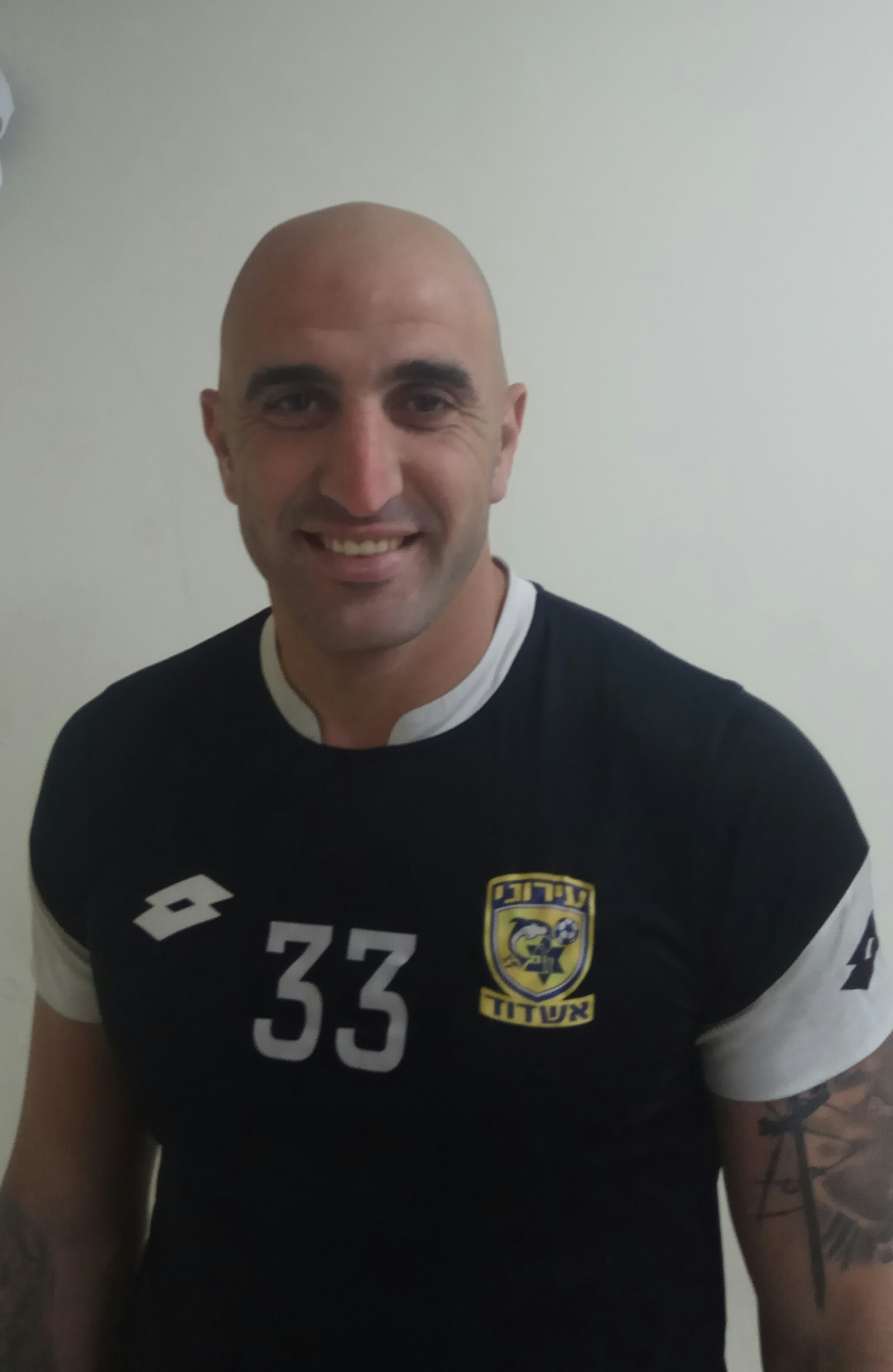
- Shekel in 2020

Personal information
- Full name: Yosef Shekel
- Date of birth: September 24, 1984 (age 42)
- Place of birth: Ashdod, Israel
- Height: 1.98 m (6 ft 6 in)
- Position: Goalkeeper

Team information
- Current team: Maccabi Ironi Ashdod
- Number: 33

Youth career
- 1994–1999: Maccabi Ironi Ashdod
- 1999–2002: F.C. Ashdod

Senior career*
Years	Team	Apps	(Gls)
2002–2011	F.C. Ashdod	24	(0)
2003–2004	→ Beitar Shimshon Tel Aviv (loan)		(0)
2004–2005	→ Bnei Yehuda (loan)	13	(0)
2005	→ Maccabi Be'er Sheva (loan)		(0)
2006	→ Maccabi Herzliya (loan)	10	(0)
2006–2007	→ Hapoel Nazareth Illit (loan)	9	(0)
2007	→ Hakoah Amidar Ramat Gan (loan)	12	(0)
2009–2010	→ Hapoel Petah Tikv (loan)	18	(0)
2011–2012	FC Kairat	4	(0)
2012–2013	Maccabi Yavne	19	(0)
2013–2015	Hapoel Rishon LeZion	55	(0)
2017–2019	Hapoel Ashdod	34	(0)
2019	Hapoel Azor	8	(0)
2019–2020	Beitar Ashdod	2	(0)
2020	Maccabi Ironi Ashdod	0	(0)

International career
2002–2007	Israel U21	9	(0)
- * Club domestic league appearances and goals as of 12 February 2020

Yossi Shekel (Hebrew: יוסי שקל; born 24 September 1984) is an Israeli footballer who plays for Maccabi Ironi Ashdod.

He previously played for FC Kairat, Hapoel Petah Tikva, Hapoel Nazareth Illit, Maccabi Herzliya, Hapoel Kfar Saba, Maccabi Be'er Sheva, Bnei Yehuda and Beitar Shimshon Tel Aviv. At international level, he played nine times for the Israeli under-21 team.

== Career ==
In January 2019, Shekel joined Hapoel Azor.
