= Konstantin Golovskoy =

Russian-Kazakhstani footballer

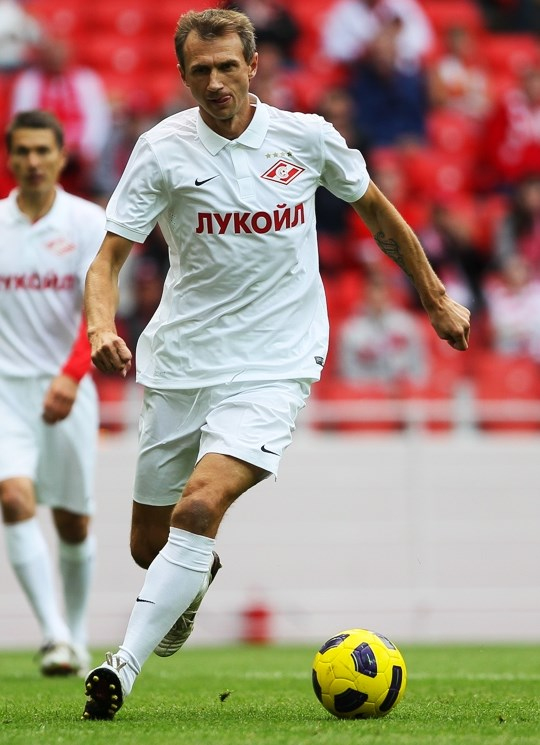

Personal information
- Full name: Konstantin Yuryevich Golovskoy
- Date of birth: 25 April 1975 (age 51)
- Place of birth: Moscow, Soviet Union
- Height: 1.86 m (6 ft 1 in)
- Positions: Defender; midfielder

Youth career
- –1992: FC Spartak Moscow

Senior career*
Years	Team	Apps	(Gls)
1993–1998	Spartak Moscow (reserves)	157	(44)
1996–1998	Spartak Moscow	24	(0)
1999–2001	Dynamo Moscow	49	(10)
2001–2004	Levski Sofia	48	(1)
2004	Terek Grozny	5	(0)
2005	Zhenis Astana	10	(5)
2006–2010	Aktobe	118	(36)
2011	Kairat	29	(10)
2012	Tobol	17	(1)
2013–2014	Taraz	10	(0)
2014–2015	Dolgoprudny	24	(6)
2016–2017	FC Odintsovo		
2018–2019	FC Fiztekh Dolgoprudny		

International career
1996–1998	Russia U-21	9	(1)
- * Club domestic league appearances and goals

Konstantin Yuryevich Golovskoy (Russian: Константин Юрьевич Головской; born 25 April 1975) is a Russian former footballer. He also holds Kazakhstani citizenship.

== Achievements ==
- Russian Premier League winner: 1996, 1997, 1998.
- Russian Cup winner: 1998.
- Bulgarian A Professional Football Group winner: 2001, 2002
- Bulgarian A Professional Football Group runner-up: 2003, 2004.
- Bulgarian Cup winner: 2002, 2003.
- Kazakhstan Premier League winner: 2007, 2008
- Kazakhstan Premier League runner-up: 2006.
- Kazakhstan Cup winner: 2008
- Kazakhstan Super Cup winner: 2008
