= Pavel Kirilchik =

Belarusian football midfielder (born 1981)

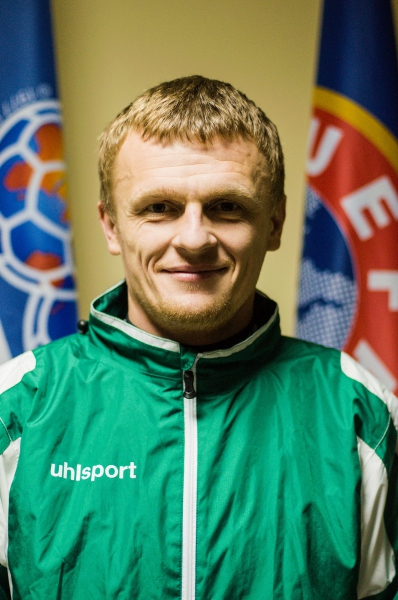
- Kirilchik with Gomel in 2013

Personal information
- Full name: Pavel Vasilyevich Kirilchik
- Date of birth: 4 January 1981 (age 45)
- Place of birth: Minsk, Belarusian SSR
- Height: 1.87 m (6 ft 2 in)
- Position: Midfielder

Team information
- Current team: Torpedo Moscow (assistant manager)

Youth career
- 1989–1998: SDYuSShOR No.5 Minsk

Senior career*
Years	Team	Apps	(Gls)
1999–2002	Torpedo-MAZ Ninsk	38	(2)
2003	Neftekhimik Nizhnekamsk	31	(1)
2004–2005	Kryvbas Kryvyi Rih	43	(0)
2006–2007	Chornomorets Odesa	19	(1)
2007–2008	Karpaty Lviv	23	(2)
2008–2010	Illichivets Mariupol	43	(1)
2010	Minsk	13	(1)
2011	Kairat Almaty	27	(0)
2012–2014	Gomel	76	(2)
2015–2016	Granit Mikashevichi	38	(2)
2016–2018	Isloch Minsk Raion	34	(0)
2018	Dnepr Mogilev	7	(0)
2019–2020	Arsenal Dzerzhinsk	42	(2)
Total		434	(14)

International career
2002–2004	Belarus U21	12	(1)
2005–2006	Belarus	4	(0)

Managerial career
- 2020: Arsenal Dzerzhinsk (assistant)
- 2020–2022: Arsenal Dzerzhinsk
- 2023: Master-Saturn
- 2024–2025: Torpedo Moscow (assistant)
- 2025: Torpedo Moscow (caretaker)
- 2025–: Torpedo Moscow (assistant)
- * Club domestic league appearances and goals

Pavel Vasilyevich Kirilchik (born 4 January 1981) is a Belarusian football coach and former player (midfielder) who is an assistant coach with Russian club Torpedo Moscow.

== Honours ==
Gomel

- Belarusian Super Cup winner: 2012
