= Bojan Trkulja =

Bosnian football manager (born 1982)

Personal information
- Date of birth: 20 February 1982 (age 44)
- Place of birth: Jajce, SFR Yugoslavia
- Height: 1.84 m (6 ft 0 in)
- Position: Defender

Team information
- Current team: Al Kharaitiyat (assistant)

Senior career*
Years	Team	Apps	(Gls)
–2002	Obilić		
2002–2003	Glasinac		
2003–2004	Žepče		
2004–2005	Rudar Ugljevik	3	(0)
2006	Sopron	1	(0)
2006	Radnički Pirot	0	(0)
2007	Beroe	10	(1)
2008	Daugava	10	(0)
2008–2009	Manama Club		
2009–2010	Sloboda Tuzla	2	(0)
2010	Kairat	26	(0)
2011–2012	Atyrau	20	(0)

International career
- Bosnia and Herzegovina U19

Managerial career
- 2024–2025: Zvijezda 09
- * Club domestic league appearances and goals

Bojan Trkulja (Serbian Cyrillic: Бојан Tpкуља; born 20 February 1982) is a Bosnian professional football manager and former player who is currently an assistant manager at Qatar Stars League 2 club Al Kharaitiyat.

== Playing career ==
Trkulja was born in Jajce, SR Bosnia and Herzegovina, then part of SFR Yugoslavia. In July 2002, he moved from First League of FR Yugoslavia club Obilić to Bosnian Premier League club Glasinac.

Trkulja also played for Kazakhstan Premier League clubs Atyrau and Kairat among others.

== Managerial career ==
On 27 March 2024, Trkulja was appointed manager of relegation threatened Bosnian Premier League side Zvijezda 09. Without a substantial number of games left to play, Zvijezda was relegated from the Bosnian Premier League following a 2–2 home draw against Igman Konjic on 4 May 2024.

== Managerial statistics ==
As of match played 31 May 2025

Managerial record by team and tenure
Team	From	To	Record							
Team	From	To	G	W	D	L	GF	GA	GD	Win %
Zvijezda 09	27 March 2024	1 June 2025	45	19	7	19	57	63	−6	42.22
Total			45	19	7	19	57	63	−6	42.22

== Honours ==
=== Player ===
Daugava

- Latvian Cup: 2008
