= Aidar Kumisbekov =

Kazakhstani footballer (born 1979)

Personal information
- Date of birth: 9 February 1979 (age 47)
- Place of birth: Soviet Union
- Height: 1.77 m (5 ft 10 in)
- Position: Defender

Senior career*
Years	Team	Apps	(Gls)
1997–2002	Kairat	84	(6)
2003–2004	Irtysh Pavlodar	61	(1)
2005–2007	Astana	54	(2)
2008–2012	Zhetysu	83	(1)
Total		282	(10)

International career^{‡}
2000–2007	Kazakhstan	9	(0)
- * Club domestic league appearances and goals as of 10 December 2015 ‡ National team caps and goals as of 23 February 2011

Aidar Kumisbekov (Kazakh: Айдар Күмісбеков, 9 February 1979) is a retired Kazakhstani professional footballer who played as a defender.

== Career ==
=== International ===
Kumisbekov played for Kazakhstan at the 1999 FIFA World Youth Championship in Nigeria.

== Career statistics ==
=== International ===
Kazakhstan
Year	Apps	Goals
2000	4	0
2001	0	0
2002	1	0
2003	0	0
2004	0	0
2005	0	0
2006	2	0
2007	2	0
Total	9	0

Statistics accurate as of match played 8 September 2007
