= Artyom Fomin =

Russian footballer

Personal information
- Full name: Artyom Valeryevich Fomin
- Date of birth: 8 July 1988 (age 38)
- Place of birth: Biysk, Russia
- Height: 1.86 m (6 ft 1 in)
- Position: Striker

Senior career*
Years	Team	Apps	(Gls)
2004–2009	Spartak Moscow	0	(0)
2008	→ Dynamo Barnaul (loan)	9	(0)
2010–2012	Kairat	45	(5)
2012–2013	Atyrau	32	(1)
- * Club domestic league appearances and goals

Artyom Valeryevich Fomin (Russian: Артём Валерьевич Фомин; born 8 July 1988) is a former Russian professional footballer.

== Club career ==
He made his professional debut in the Russian First Division in 2008 for FC Dynamo Barnaul.
