= Javier León (footballer) =

Argentine footballer

Personal information
- Full name: Javier Ignacio León Mira
- Date of birth: 23 May 1982 (age 44)
- Height: 1.88 m (6 ft 2 in)
- Position: Defender

Team information
- Current team: Nacional Potosí

Senior career*
Years	Team	Apps	(Gls)
2005	Unión Huaral		
2006	Tacuarembó		
2007	Real Potosí		
2008–2009	Douglas Haig		
2009	Vasalund	5	(0)
2010	Cobresal	17	(1)
2011	Atyrau	17	(1)
2013	Racing de Córdoba		
2014	Club Aurora	19	(0)
2015–	Nacional Potosí	5	(0)
- * Club domestic league appearances and goals as of 10:30, 7 January 2016 (UTC)

Javier Ignacio León Mira (born March 23, 1982, in Córdoba, Argentina) is an Argentine central defender, with a lot of experiencie playing around the world currently with no club.
