= 2005 FC Rubin Kazan season =

FC Rubin Kazan
2005 season
- Chairman: Farit Khabriyev
- Manager: Kurban Berdyev
- Stadium: Central Stadium
- Premier League: 4th
- Russian Cup: Progressed to 2006 season
- Top goalscorer: League: Tomáš Čížek (7); All: Wladimir Baýramow; Tomáš Čížek (7 each)
- Highest home attendance: 21,500 vs Spartak Moscow (23 July 2005)
- Lowest home attendance: 7,000 vs Terek Grozny (21 May 2005); 7,000 vs Alania Vladikavkaz (17 September 2005)
- Average home league attendance: 11,800 (19 November 2005)

The 2005 FC Rubin Kazan season was the club's 3rd season in the Russian Premier League, the highest tier of association football in Russia. They finished the season in fourth position, qualifying for the second round of 2006–07 UEFA Cup and progressed to the Round 16 in the Russian Cup.

== Squad ==
As of match played 19 November 2005

| No. | Name | Nationality | Position | Date of birth (age) | Signed from | Signed in | Contract ends | Apps. | Goals |
Goalkeepers
| 1 | Aleksandrs Koliņko | (Latvia) | GK | 18 June 1975 (aged 30) | Rostov | 2005 | | 17 | 0 |
| 12 | Dmitri Chigazov | (Russia) | GK | 29 June 1983 (aged 22) | Atyrau | 2003 | | | |
| 79 | Pavel Kharchik | (Turkmenistan) | GK | 5 April 1979 (aged 26) | Neftekhimik Nizhnekamsk | 2004 | | | |
| 85 | Aleksandr Petukhov | (Kazakhstan) | GK | 11 January 1985 (aged 20) | Atyrau | 2003 | | 0 | 0 |
Defenders
| 2 | Óscar Díaz | (Paraguay) | DF | 29 January 1984 (aged 21) | Saturn Ramenskoye | 2005 | | 6 | 0 |
| 3 | Calisto | (Brazil) | DF | 18 December 1975 (aged 29) | Bahia | 2003 | | 52 | 4 |
| 4 | Marat Makhmutov | (Russia) | DF | 3 September 1975 (aged 30) | Torpedo Moscow | 2004 | | 18 | 1 |
| 5 | Andrei Fyodorov | (Uzbekistan) | DF | 10 April 1971 (aged 34) | Baltika Kaliningrad | 2000 | | | |
| 9 | Lasha Salukvadze | (Georgia (country)) | DF | 21 December 1981 (aged 23) | Dinamo Tbilisi | 2005 | | 23 | 0 |
| 18 | Lenar Gilmullin | (Russia) | DF | 17 June 1985 (aged 20) | Youth Team | 2003 | | 4 | 0 |
| 21 | Mikhail Sinyov | (Russia) | DF | 21 June 1972 (aged 33) | Torpedo-ZIL Moscow | 2002 | | | |
| 25 | Rustem Khuzin | (Russia) | DF | 30 January 1972 (aged 33) | Amkar Perm | 2005 | | | |
Midfielders
| 6 | MacBeth Sibaya | (South Africa) | MF | 25 November 1977 (aged 27) | Rosenborg | 2003 | | 37 | 1 |
| 8 | Jørgen Jalland | (Norway) | MF | 9 September 1977 (aged 28) | Vålerenga | 2005 | | 14 | 1 |
| 11 | Tomáš Čížek | (Czech Republic) | MF | 27 November 1978 (aged 26) | Sparta Prague | 2003 | | 48 | 9 |
| 14 | Andrei Konovalov | (Russia) | MF | 13 September 1974 (aged 31) | Krylia Sovetov | 2002 | | | |
| 15 | Vitālijs Astafjevs | (Latvia) | MF | 3 April 1971 (aged 34) | Admira Wacker | 2004 | | 32 | 4 |
| 19 | Andrés Scotti | (Uruguay) | MF | 14 December 1975 (aged 29) | Nacional | 2003 | | 58 | 9 |
| 27 | Georgi Kinkladze | (Georgia (country)) | MF | 6 July 1973 (aged 32) | Anorthosis Famagusta | 2005 | | 7 | 2 |
| 28 | Orestas Buitkus | (Lithuania) | MF | 11 April 1975 (aged 30) | Skonto | 2005 | | 11 | 1 |
| 77 | Ansar Ayupov | (Russia) | MF | 23 March 1972 (aged 33) | Chernomorets Novorossiysk | 2004 | | 41 | 3 |
| 98 | Dmitri Vasilyev | (Russia) | MF | 25 March 1977 (aged 28) | Shinnik Yaroslavl | 2005 | | 7 | 0 |
Forwards
| 7 | Alejandro Domínguez | (Argentina) | FW | 10 June 1981 (aged 24) | River Plate | 2004 | | 46 | 8 |
| 10 | Damani Ralph | (Jamaica) | FW | 6 November 1980 (aged 25) | Chicago Fire | 2005 | | 25 | 2 |
| 20 | Igor Simutenkov | (Russia) | FW | 3 April 1973 (aged 32) | Kansas City Wizards | 2005 | | 3 | 0 |
| 23 | Ebrima Ebou Sillah | (The Gambia) | FW | 12 April 1980 (aged 25) | Club Brugge | 2003 | | 29 | 4 |
| 30 | Aleksandr Bukharov | (Russia) | FW | 12 March 1985 (aged 20) | Chernomorets Novorossiysk | 2005 | | 9 | 2 |
| 32 | Wladimir Baýramow | (Turkmenistan) | FW | 2 August 1980 (aged 25) | Metallurg Krasnoyarsk | 2003 | | 24 | 7 |
Away on loan
| 98 | Dmitri Shestakov | (Russia) | MF | 26 February 1983 (aged 22) | Chernomorets Novorossiysk | 2005 | | 0 | 0 |
Players that left Rubin Kazan during the season
| 8 | Aloísio | (Brazil) | FW | 27 January 1975 (aged 30) | Paris Saint-Germain | 2003 | | 6 | 0 |
| 17 | Rôni | (Brazil) | FW | 28 April 1977 (aged 28) | Fluminense | 2003 | | 38 | 14 |
| 24 | Aleksei Bakharev | (Ukraine) | MF | 12 October 1976 (aged 29) | loan from Shakhtar Donetsk | 2005 | | | |
| 31 | Moustapha Mouhamadou Mané | (Senegal) | FW | 19 January 1984 (aged 21) | AS Police | 2003 | | 0 | 0 |
| 35 | Pavel Zhuravlyov | (Russia) | MF | 3 July 1984 (aged 21) | Youth Team | 2005 | | | |

=== On loan ===
Note: Flags indicate national team as defined under FIFA eligibility rules; some limited exceptions apply. Players may hold more than one non-FIFA nationality.

| No. / Pos. / Nation / Player; 98 / MF / RUS / Dmitri Shestakov (at Chkalovets-1936 Novosibirsk) | No. / Pos. / Nation / Player |

=== Left club during season ===
Note: Flags indicate national team as defined under FIFA eligibility rules; some limited exceptions apply. Players may hold more than one non-FIFA nationality.

| No. | Pos. | Nation | Player |
|---|---|---|---|
| 8 | FW | BRA | Rôni (to São Paulo) |
| 17 | FW | BRA | Rôni (to Goiás) |
| 24 | MF | UKR | Aleksei Bakharev (loan return to Shakhtar Donetsk) |

| No. | Pos. | Nation | Player |
|---|---|---|---|
| 31 | FW | SEN | Moustapha Mouhamadou Mané |
| 35 | MF | RUS | Pavel Zhuravlyov |

== Transfers ==
=== In ===
| Date | Position | Nationality | Name | From | Fee | Ref. |
|---|---|---|---|---|---|---|
| 6 January 2005 | MF | (Norway) | Jørgen Jalland | Vålerenga | Undisclosed | |
| 22 January 2005 | FW | (Jamaica) | Damani Ralph | Chicago Fire | Undisclosed | |
| Winter 2005 | GK | (Latvia) | Aleksandrs Koliņko | Rostov | Undisclosed | |
| Winter 2005 | DF | (Georgia (country)) | Lasha Salukvadze | Dinamo Tbilisi | Undisclosed | |
| Winter 2005 | DF | (Paraguay) | Óscar Díaz | Saturn Ramenskoye | Undisclosed | |
| Winter 2005 | DF | (Russia) | Rustem Khuzin | Amkar Perm | Undisclosed | |
| Winter 2005 | MF | (Lithuania) | Orestas Buitkus | Skonto | Undisclosed | |
| Winter 2005 | FW | (Russia) | Igor Simutenkov | Kansas City Wizards | Undisclosed | |
| Winter 2005 | FW | (Russia) | Aleksandr Bukharov | Chernomorets Novorossiysk | Undisclosed | |
| Winter 2005 | FW | (Russia) | Dmitri Shestakov | Sportakademklub Moscow | Undisclosed | |
| 26 August 2005 | MF | (Georgia (country)) | Georgi Kinkladze | Anorthosis Famagusta | Undisclosed | |

=== Loans in ===
| Date from | Position | Nationality | Name | To | Date to | Ref. |
|---|---|---|---|---|---|---|
| Winter 2005 | FW | (Ukraine) | Aleksei Bakharev | Shakhtar Donetsk | Summer 2005 | |

=== Loans out ===
| Date from | Position | Nationality | Name | To | Date to | Ref. |
|---|---|---|---|---|---|---|
| Winter 2005 | DF | (Czech Republic) | Adam Petrouš | Austria Wien | Summer 2006 | |
| Winter 2005 | MF | (Croatia) | Radosav Bulić | Spartak Chelyabinsk | Summer 2006 | |
| Winter 2005 | FW | (Brazil) | Aloísio | Athletico Paranaense | Summer 2006 | |
| Summer 2005 | FW | (Russia) | Dmitri Shestakov | Chkalovets-1936 Novosibirsk | Winter 2006 | |

=== Released ===
| Date | Position | Nationality | Name | Joined | Date |
|---|---|---|---|---|---|
| Summer 2005 | DF | (Czech Republic) | Adam Petrouš | Sparta Prague | |
| Summer 2005 | MF | (Croatia) | Radosav Bulić | Voždovac | |
| Summer 2005 | MF | (Russia) | Pavel Zhuravlyov | | |
| Summer 2005 | FW | (Brazil) | Aloísio | São Paulo | |
| Summer 2005 | FW | (Brazil) | Rôni | Goiás | |
| Summer 2005 | FW | (Senegal) | Moustapha Mouhamadou Mané | | |
| Winter 2006 | DF | (Paraguay) | Óscar Díaz | Deportes Quindío | |
| Winter 2006 | MF | (Czech Republic) | Tomáš Čížek | Moscow | |
| Winter 2006 | MF | (Latvia) | Vitālijs Astafjevs | Skonto | |
| Winter 2006 | MF | (Russia) | Andrei Konovalov | Shinnik Yaroslavl | |
| Winter 2006 | MF | (Lithuania) | Orestas Buitkus | Banga Gargždai | |
| Winter 2006 | FW | (Russia) | Igor Simutenkov | Dynamo Voronezh | |
| Winter 2006 | FW | (The Gambia) | Ebrima Ebou Sillah | RBC Roosendaal | |

== Competitions ==
=== Premier League ===
==== Results by round ====
| Round | 1 | 2 | 3 | 4 | 5 | 6 | 7 | 8 | 9 | 10 | 11 | 12 | 13 | 14 | 15 | 16 | 17 | 18 | 19 | 20 | 21 | 22 | 23 | 24 | 25 | 26 | 27 | 28 | 29 | 30 |
|---|---|---|---|---|---|---|---|---|---|---|---|---|---|---|---|---|---|---|---|---|---|---|---|---|---|---|---|---|---|---|
| Ground | A | A | A | A | H | H | H | A | H | A | H | A | H | A | H | H | H | H | H | A | A | A | H | A | H | A | H | A | H | A |
| Result | D | L | W | L | W | D | W | L | D | W | W | D | W | D | W | D | D | D | W | L | W | L | W | W | D | L | W | W | W | L |

Updated to match(es) played on 19 November 2005. Source: See Results
A = Away; H = Home; W = Win; D = Draw; L = Loss

==== Results ====
| 13 March 2005 1 | Saturn Ramenskoye | 0 – 0 | Rubin Kazan | Ramenskoye |
| 18:00 MSK (UTC+3) | Sviderskyi (yellow card) 57'; Géder (yellow card) 72' | Report | | Stadium: Saturn Stadium; Attendance: 6,000; Referee: Almir Kayumov |

| 20 March 2005 2 | Spartak Moscow | 3 – 0 | Rubin Kazan | Kazan |
| 17:00 MSK (UTC+3) | Pavlenko (yellow card) 15'; Cavenaghi 31' (pen.); Vidić (yellow card) 35'; Titov 64', 73' | Report | Astafjevs (yellow card) 9'; Scotti (yellow card) 15'; Koliņko (yellow card) 31'; Sinyov (yellow card) 33' | Stadium: Central Stadium; Attendance: 10,000; Referee: Sergey Fursa |

| 2 April 2005 3 | Moscow | 0 – 1 | Rubin Kazan | Moscow |
| 20:00 MSK (UTC+3) | Rebeja (yellow card) 24'; Biletskyi (yellow card) 57' | Report | Rôni (yellow card) 54'; Čížek 90+' | Stadium: Luzhniki Stadium; Attendance: 4,000; Referee: Alexander Evstigneev |

| 9 April 2005 4 | Lokomotiv Moscow | 1 – 0 | Rubin Kazan | Moscow |
| 18:00 MSK (UTC+3) | Sychev 55'; Sennikov (yellow card) 72'; Ovchinnikov (yellow card) 90+' | Report | Salukvadze (yellow card) 20'; Jalland (yellow card) 34' | Stadium: RZD Arena; Attendance: 9,181; Referee: Alexander Gonchar |

| 16 April 2005 5 | Rubin Kazan | 2 – 0 | Amkar Perm | Kazan |
| 16:00 MSK (UTC+3) | Konovalov (yellow card) 29'; Rôni (yellow card) 43' (goal) 75'; Baýramow 50'; Čížek (yellow card) 72'; Buitkus (yellow card) 90+'; Ralph (yellow card) 90+' | Report | Lavrik (yellow card) 32'; Savochkin (yellow card) 44'; Bakhtin (yellow card) 57'; Shutov (yellow card) 64' | Stadium: Central Stadium; Attendance: 7,800; Referee: Alexander Kolobaev |

| 23 April 2005 6 | Rubin Kazan | 1 – 1 | Rostov | Kazan |
| 16:00 MSK (UTC+3) | Scotti 40'; Domínguez (yellow card) 71' | Report | Kanyenda 12'; Osinov (yellow card) 40'; Shirshov (yellow card) 53' | Stadium: Central Stadium; Attendance: 8,000; Referee: Mikhail Khodyrev |

| 30 April 2005 7 | Rubin Kazan | 2 – 1 | Dynamo Moscow | Kazan |
| 16:00 MSK (UTC+3) | Rôni 32' (pen.); Makhmutov (yellow card) 45'; Domínguez 63' | Report | Bulykin (yellow card) 45'; Tanasijević (yellow card) 49' | Stadium: Central Stadium; Attendance: 7,500; Referee: Yuri Klyuchnikov |

| 15 May 2005 8 | Alania Vladikavkaz | 4 – 3 | Rubin Kazan | Vladikavkaz |
| 16:00 MSK (UTC+3) | Burduli (yellow card) 26'; D.Bazayev 55', 69', 74'; Grujić (yellow card) 56'; Daraselia (yellow card) 63'; Tudor (yellow card) 63' (goal) 85'; G.Bazayev 74'; Žutautas (yellow card) 80'; Gogniyev (yellow card) 82' | Report | Ralph 10'; Rôni (yellow card) 26' (goal) 67'; Scotti 45+' | Stadium: Republican Spartak Stadium; Attendance: 19,000; Referee: Igor Zakharov |

| 21 May 2005 9 | Rubin Kazan | 1 – 1 | Terek Grozny | Kazan |
| 16:00 MSK (UTC+3) | Čížek 2'; Ayupov (yellow card) 17'; Rôni (penalty missed) 58' | Report | Datsenko (yellow card) 29'; Ajinjal (yellow card) 56'; Fedkov 78' (yellow card) 81' | Stadium: Central Stadium; Attendance: 7,000; Referee: Sergei Martynov |

| 28 May 2005 10 | Tom Tomsk | 1 – 2 | Rubin Kazan | Tomsk |
| 16:00 MSK (UTC+3) | Yaskovich (yellow card) 59'; Yanotovsky (yellow card) 62'; Șișchin 81' | Report | Astafjevs 4'; Čížek (yellow card) 29'; Sillah 44'; Kharchik (yellow card) 72'; Konovalov (yellow card) 89' | Stadium: Trud Stadium; Attendance: 10,500; Referee: Alexey Nikolaev |

| 12 June 2005 11 | Rubin Kazan | 1 – 0 | CSKA Moscow | Kazan |
| 18:00 MSK (UTC+3) | Čížek 30'; Konovalov (yellow card) 71'; Scotti (yellow card) 89' | Report | Krasić (yellow card) 27' | Stadium: Tsentralnyi Stadion; Attendance: 18,200; Referee: Yuri Klyuchnikov |

| 18 June 2005 12 | Krylia Sovetov | 2 – 2 | Rubin Kazan | Samara |
| 18:00 MSK (UTC+3) | Husin 12'; Koroman 75' (yellow card) 76' | Report | Domínguez 18'; Konovalov 77' | Stadium: Metallurg Stadium; Attendance: 18,000; Referee: Almir Kayumov |

| 25 June 2005 13 | Rubin Kazan | 1 – 0 | Zenit St.Petersburg | Kazan |
| MSK (UTC+3) | Sillah (yellow card) 61'; Scotti 90+' | Report | Vještica (yellow card) 31'; Čadikovski (yellow card) 45'; Spivak (yellow card) 61' | Stadium: Central Stadium; Attendance: 16,500; Referee: Mikhail Veselovsky |

| 2 July 2005 14 | Torpedo Moscow | 1 – 1 | Rubin Kazan | Moscow |
| 17:00 MSK (UTC+3) | Jokić (yellow card) 21'; Panfyorov (yellow card) 27'; Stepanov 31'; Lutsenko (yellow card) 58' | Report | Buitkus 25'; Scotti (yellow card) 86'; Kharchik (yellow card) 87' | Stadium: Luzhniki Stadium; Attendance: 2,000; Referee: Sergey Lapochkin |

| 9 July 2005 15 | Rubin Kazan | 2 – 0 | Shinnik Yaroslavl | Kazan |
| 18:00 MSK (UTC+3) | Domínguez (yellow card) 26'; Baýramow 64'; Scotti (yellow card) 78'; Ayupov 84' (pen.); Konovalov (yellow card) 84' | Report | Budiša (yellow card) 40'; Shtanyuk (yellow card) 83'; Branco (yellow card) 86' (penalty missed) 88' | Stadium: Central Stadium; Attendance: 11,500; Referee: Igor Zakharov |

| 17 July 2005 16 | Rubin Kazan | 0 – 0 | Saturn Ramenskoye | Kazan |
| 19:00 MSK (UTC+3) | | Report | Jean (yellow card) 25'; Shirokov (yellow card) 56'; Yesipov (yellow card) 78' | Stadium: Central Stadium; Attendance: 12,000; Referee: Yuri Baskakov |

| 23 July 2005 17 | Rubin Kazan | 0 – 0 | Spartak Moscow | Kazan |
| 18:00 MSK (UTC+3) | Fyodorov (yellow card) 36'; Scotti (yellow card) 42' | Report | Dedura (yellow card) 16'; Kowalewski (yellow card) 25'; Kováč (yellow card) 36'; Rodríguez (yellow card) 59' | Stadium: Central Stadium; Attendance: 21,500; Referee: Alexander Evstigneev |

| 30 July 2005 18 | Rubin Kazan | 1 – 1 | Moscow | Kazan |
| 18:00 MSK (UTC+3) | Baýramow 88' | Report | Godunok (yellow card) 53'; Kuzmin 83' | Stadium: Central Stadium; Attendance: 10,000; Referee: Nikolai Ivanov |

| 6 August 2005 19 | Rubin Kazan | 3 – 1 | Lokomotiv Moscow | Kazan |
| 17:00 MSK (UTC+3) | Ayupov 11' (pen.); Domínguez 33'; Sinyov (yellow card) 72'; Baýramow 75'; Calisto (yellow card) 79' | Report | Lebedenko 80'; Asatiani (yellow card) 89' | Stadium: Central Stadium; Attendance: 15,200; Referee: Vladimir Pettay |

| 21 August 2005 20 | Amkar Perm | 1 – 0 | Rubin Kazan | Perm |
| 17"00 MSK (UTC+3) | Lavrik (yellow card) 71'; Kushev (yellow card) 71'; Pyatibratov (yellow card) 77'; Sarkisyan 85' | Report | Scotti (yellow card) 71'; Khuzin (yellow card) 75'; Sibaya (yellow card) 80' | Stadium: Zvezda Stadium; Attendance: 13,000; Referee: Mikhail Veselovsky |

| 27 August 2005 21 | Rostov | 0 – 1 | Rubin Kazan | Rostov-on-Don |
| 18:00 MSK (UTC+3) | | Report | Sinyov (yellow card) 53'; Astafjevs 77'; Vasilyev (yellow card) 85' | Stadium: Olimp-2; Attendance: 7,500; Referee: Sergey Frantsuzov |

| 11 September 2005 22 | Dynamo Moscow | 3 – 1 | Rubin Kazan | Moscow |
| 18:00 MSK (UTC+3) | Maniche 40'; Kolodin (yellow card) 56'; Derlei 72' (yellow card) 72'; Tochilin 76' | Report | Ayupov (yellow card) 7'; Calisto 45' | Stadium: Central Dynamo Stadium; Attendance: 6,000; Referee: Alexey Tyumin |

| 17 September 2005 23 | Rubin Kazan | 4 – 2 | Alania Vladikavkaz | Kazan |
| 16:00 MSK (UTC+3) | Scotti 6' (pen.); Vasilyev (yellow card) 44'; Domínguez 68'; Bukharov (yellow card) 78'; Čížek 83'; Calisto 88'; Fyodorov (yellow card) 90+' | Report | D.Bazayev 54', 81' (pen.) (yellow card) 90+'; Jiménez (yellow card) 62' | Stadium: Central Stadium; Attendance: 7,000; Referee: Mikhail Khodyrev |

| 25 September 2005 24 | Terek Grozny | 1 – 5 | Rubin Kazan | Pyatigorsk |
| 18:00 MSK (UTC+3) | Kingston (yellow card) 25' (yellow-red card) 39'; Atangana 42' | Report | Domínguez 9', 80' (pen.); Čížek (yellow card) 56' (goal) 68'; Kinkladze 63', 72'; Fyodorov (yellow card) 65' | Stadium: Central Stadium; Attendance: 5,000; Referee: Sergey Frantsuzov |

| 2 October 2005 25 | Rubin Kazan | 0 – 0 | Tom Tomsk | Kazan |
| 19:00 MSK (UTC+3) | Calisto (yellow card) 66'; Kinkladze (penalty missed) 82' | Report | Catînsus (yellow card) 53'; Bornosuzov (yellow card) 70' | Stadium: Central Stadium; Attendance: 8,000; Referee: Aleksey Sergeyev |

| 16 October 2005 26 | CSKA Moscow | 2 – 1 | Rubin Kazan | Moscow |
| 18:00 MSK (UTC+3) | Odiah 11'; Ignashevich 51'; Berezutski (yellow card) 82'; Carvalho (yellow card) 86'; Samodin (yellow card) 87' | Report | Bukharov 68' | Stadium: Dynamo Stadium; Attendance: 6,500; Referee: Vladimir Pettay |

| 23 October 2005 27 | Rubin Kazan | 2 – 1 | Krylia Sovetov | Kazan |
| 16:00 MSK (UTC+3) | Baýramow 3'; Bukharov 18'; Vasilyev (yellow card) 71' | Report | Șoavă (yellow card) 43'; Adamu 51'; Husin (yellow card) 67'; Gadzhiyev (yellow card) 75' | Stadium: Central Stadium; Attendance: 12,000; Referee: Alexander Kolobaev |

| 30 October 2005 28 | Zenit St.Petersburg | 0 – 1 | Rubin Kazan | Saint Petersburg |
| 20:00 MSK (UTC+3) | Flachbart (yellow card) 23'; Kerzhakov (yellow card) 48'; Denisov (yellow card) 54'; Hagen (yellow card) 90+' | Report | Baýramow (yellow card) 40' (goal) 56'; Kinkladze (yellow card) 45'; Vasilyev (yellow card) 60' | Stadium: Petrovsky Stadium; Attendance: 18,856; Referee: Yuri Baskakov |

| 6 November 2005 29 | Rubin Kazan | 5 – 1 | Torpedo Moscow | Kazan |
| 14:00 MSK (UTC+3) | Ralph 26'; Sibaya (yellow card) 33'; Calisto 39'; Čížek 50'; Scotti 75'; Jalland 79' | Report | Lutsenko (yellow card) 35'; Budylin 51'; Stepanov (yellow card) 73' | Stadium: Central Stadium; Attendance: 14,800; Referee: Aleksandr Gvardis |

| 19 November 2005 30 | Shinnik Yaroslavl | 3 – 2 | Rubin Kazan | Yaroslavl |
| 14:00 MSK (UTC+3) | Shirko 9'; Koshelev 12' (yellow card) 50'; Pogrebnyak (yellow card) 22'; Łągiewka 30'; Chernogayev (yellow card) 53' | Report | Fyodorov (yellow card) 28'; Khuzin (yellow card) 33'; Sinyov (yellow card) 58'; Baýramow (yellow card) 70'; Ayupov 77' (pen.); Buitkus (yellow card) 81'; Čížek 90+' | Stadium: Shinnik Stadium; Attendance: 4,550; Referee: Igor Zakharov |

==== League table ====
| Pos | Team | Pld | W | D | L | GF | GA | GD | Pts | Qualification or relegation |
|---|---|---|---|---|---|---|---|---|---|---|
| 1 | CSKA Moscow (C) | 30 | 18 | 8 | 4 | 48 | 20 | +28 | 62 | 2006–07 UEFA Champions League Third qualifying round |
| 2 | Spartak Moscow | 30 | 16 | 8 | 6 | 47 | 26 | +21 | 56 | 2006–07 UEFA Champions League Second qualifying round |
| 3 | Lokomotiv Moscow | 30 | 14 | 14 | 2 | 41 | 18 | +23 | 56 | 2006–07 UEFA Cup First round (Note: Since CSKA Moscow won the 2005–06 Russian Cup, and winner of the Russian Cup should advance to the first round of UEFA Cup, the spot was awarded to 3rd-positioned team, because CSKA Moscow already qualified for UEFA Champions League. As a result, 4th-positioned team received a spot in the second qualifying round of UEFA Cup, and 5th-positioned team received a spot in the second round of UEFA Intertoto Cup) |
| 4 | Rubin Kazan | 30 | 14 | 9 | 7 | 45 | 31 | +14 | 51 | 2006–07 UEFA Cup Second qualifying round |
| 5 | FC Moscow | 30 | 14 | 8 | 8 | 36 | 26 | +10 | 50 | 2006 UEFA Intertoto Cup Second round |
| 6 | Zenit St. Petersburg | 30 | 12 | 10 | 8 | 45 | 26 | +19 | 46 | |
| 7 | Torpedo Moscow | 30 | 12 | 9 | 9 | 37 | 33 | +4 | 45 | |
| 8 | Dynamo Moscow | 30 | 13 | 2 | 15 | 39 | 43 | −4 | 41 | |
| 9 | Shinnik Yaroslavl | 30 | 9 | 11 | 10 | 26 | 31 | −5 | 38 | |
| 10 | Tom Tomsk | 30 | 9 | 10 | 11 | 28 | 33 | −5 | 37 | |
| 11 | Saturn | 30 | 8 | 9 | 13 | 23 | 25 | −2 | 33 | |
| 12 | Amkar Perm | 30 | 7 | 12 | 11 | 25 | 36 | −11 | 33 | |
| 13 | Rostov | 30 | 8 | 7 | 15 | 26 | 41 | −15 | 31 | |
| 14 | Krylia Sovetov Samara | 30 | 7 | 8 | 15 | 29 | 44 | −15 | 29 | |
| 15 | Alania Vladikavkaz (R) | 30 | 5 | 8 | 17 | 27 | 53 | −26 | 23 | Relegation to 2006 Russian First Division |
| 16 | Terek Grozny (R) | 30 | 5 | 5 | 20 | 20 | 50 | −30 | 14 (Note: Terek had 6 points deducted for failing to pay transfer fee in time.) | Relegation to 2006 Russian First Division |

Source: RFPL
Rules for classification: 1st points; 2nd matches won; 3rd goal difference; 4th head-to-head (points, matches won, goal difference, goals scored, away goals scored)
(C) Champions; (R) Relegated

=== Russian Cup ===
==== 2005-06 ====
| 6 July 2005 Last 32 1st leg | Rubin Kazan | 1 – 0 | Vityaz Podolsk | Kazan |
| 18:00 MSK (UTC+3) | Calisto (yellow card) 41'; Konovalov 66'; Simutenkov (yellow card) 80'; Ayupov (yellow card) 90+' | Report | Smirnov (yellow card) 71' | Stadium: Central Stadium; Attendance: 4,000; Referee: Aleksei Nikolaev |

| 13 July 2005 Last 32 2nd leg | Vityaz Podolsk | 1 – 2 (1 – 3 agg.) | Rubin Kazan | Podolsk |
| 18:00 MSK (UTC+3) | Grigoryan 68' | Report | Jalland (yellow card) 39'; Calisto (yellow card) 44'; Sillah 63'; Baýramow 75'; Fyodorov (yellow card) 90+' | Stadium: Trud Stadium; Attendance: 4,000; Referee: Denis Kozmin |

The Round of 16 games took place during the 2006 season.

== Squad statistics ==
As of match played 19 November 2005

=== Appearances and goals ===
| No. | Pos | Nat | Player | Total | | Premier League | | 2005–06 Russian Cup | |
| No. | Pos | Nat | Player | Apps | Goals | Apps | Goals | Apps | Goals |
|---|---|---|---|---|---|---|---|---|---|
| 1 | GK | (Latvia) LVA | Aleksandrs Koliņko | 17 | 0 | 17 | 0 | 0 | 0 |
| 2 | DF | (Paraguay) PAR | Óscar Díaz | 6 | 0 | 4+1 | 0 | 1 | 0 |
| 3 | DF | (Brazil) BRA | Calisto | 29 | 3 | 27 | 3 | 2 | 0 |
| 4 | DF | (Russia) RUS | Marat Makhmutov | 10 | 0 | 8+2 | 0 | 0 | 0 |
| 5 | DF | (Uzbekistan) UZB | Andrei Fyodorov | 16 | 0 | 14+1 | 0 | 1 | 0 |
| 6 | MF | (South Africa) RSA | MacBeth Sibaya | 12 | 0 | 10+2 | 0 | 0 | 0 |
| 7 | FW | (Argentina) ARG | Alejandro Domínguez | 24 | 6 | 10+12 | 6 | 2 | 0 |
| 8 | MF | (Norway) NOR | Jørgen Jalland | 14 | 1 | 7+5 | 1 | 2 | 0 |
| 9 | DF | (Georgia (country)) GEO | Lasha Salukvadze | 23 | 0 | 21+1 | 0 | 1 | 0 |
| 10 | FW | (Jamaica) JAM | Damani Ralph | 25 | 2 | 20+5 | 2 | 0 | 0 |
| 11 | MF | (Czech Republic) CZE | Tomáš Čížek | 21 | 7 | 16+5 | 7 | 0 | 0 |
| 14 | MF | (Russia) RUS | Andrei Konovalov | 22 | 2 | 19+2 | 1 | 1 | 1 |
| 15 | MF | (Latvia) LVA | Vitālijs Astafjevs | 23 | 2 | 17+5 | 2 | 1 | 0 |
| 18 | DF | (Russia) RUS | Lenar Gilmullin | 4 | 0 | 4 | 0 | 0 | 0 |
| 19 | MF | (Uruguay) URU | Andrés Scotti | 30 | 5 | 29 | 5 | 1 | 0 |
| 20 | FW | (Russia) RUS | Igor Simutenkov | 3 | 0 | 0+1 | 0 | 0+2 | 0 |
| 21 | DF | (Russia) RUS | Mikhail Sinyov | 19 | 0 | 15+2 | 0 | 2 | 0 |
| 23 | FW | (The Gambia) GAM | Ebrima Ebou Sillah | 17 | 2 | 11+4 | 1 | 2 | 1 |
| 25 | DF | (Russia) RUS | Rustem Khuzin | 9 | 0 | 3+4 | 0 | 0+2 | 0 |
| 27 | MF | (Georgia (country)) GEO | Georgi Kinkladze | 7 | 2 | 7 | 2 | 0 | 0 |
| 28 | MF | (Lithuania) LTU | Orestas Buitkus | 11 | 1 | 4+6 | 1 | 0+1 | 0 |
| 30 | FW | (Russia) RUS | Aleksandr Bukharov | 9 | 2 | 1+7 | 2 | 0+1 | 0 |
| 32 | FW | (Turkmenistan) TKM | Wladimir Baýramow | 23 | 7 | 13+8 | 6 | 2 | 1 |
| 77 | MF | (Russia) RUS | Ansar Ayupov | 26 | 3 | 23+1 | 3 | 2 | 0 |
| 79 | GK | (Turkmenistan) TKM | Pavel Kharchik | 15 | 0 | 13 | 0 | 2 | 0 |
| 98 | MF | (Russia) RUS | Dmitri Vasilyev | 7 | 0 | 7 | 0 | 0 | 0 |
Players away from the club on loan:
Players who appeared for Rubin Kazan but left during the season:
| 17 | FW | (Brazil) BRA | Rôni | 9 | 3 | 8+1 | 3 | 0 | 0 |

=== Goal scorers ===
| Place | Position | Nation | Number | Name | Premier League | 2005–06 Russian Cup | Total |
|---|---|---|---|---|---|---|---|
| 1 | MF | (Czech Republic) | 11 | Tomáš Čížek | 7 | 0 | 7 |
| 1 | FW | (Turkmenistan) | 32 | Wladimir Baýramow | 6 | 1 | 7 |
| 3 | FW | (Argentina) | 7 | Alejandro Domínguez | 6 | 0 | 6 |
| 4 | MF | (Uruguay) | 19 | Andrés Scotti | 5 | 0 | 5 |
| 5 | FW | (Brazil) | 17 | Rôni | 3 | 0 | 3 |
| 5 | DF | (Brazil) | 3 | Calisto | 3 | 0 | 3 |
| 5 | MF | (Russia) | 77 | Ansar Ayupov | 3 | 0 | 3 |
| 8 | MF | (Latvia) | 15 | Vitālijs Astafjevs | 2 | 0 | 2 |
| 8 | MF | (Georgia (country)) | 27 | Georgi Kinkladze | 2 | 0 | 2 |
| 8 | FW | (Russia) | 30 | Aleksandr Bukharov | 2 | 0 | 2 |
| 8 | FW | (Jamaica) | 10 | Damani Ralph | 2 | 0 | 2 |
| 8 | FW | (The Gambia) | 23 | Ebrima Ebou Sillah | 1 | 1 | 2 |
| 8 | MF | (Russia) | 14 | Andrei Konovalov | 1 | 1 | 2 |
| 14 | MF | (Lithuania) | 28 | Orestas Buitkus | 1 | 0 | 1 |
| 14 | MF | (Norway) | 8 | Jørgen Jalland | 1 | 0 | 1 |
| Total | | | | | 45 | 3 | 48 |

=== Disciplinary record ===
| Number | Nation | Position | Name | Premier League | | 2005–06 Russian Cup | | Total | |
| Number | Nation | Position | Name | Booked | Sent off (straight red) | Booked | Sent off (straight red) | Booked | Sent off (straight red) |
|---|---|---|---|---|---|---|---|---|---|
| 1 | (Latvia) | GK | Aleksandrs Koliņko | 1 | 0 | 0 | 0 | 1 | 0 |
| 3 | (Brazil) | DF | Calisto | 2 | 0 | 2 | 0 | 4 | 0 |
| 4 | (Russia) | DF | Marat Makhmutov | 1 | 0 | 0 | 0 | 1 | 0 |
| 5 | (Uzbekistan) | DF | Andrei Fyodorov | 4 | 0 | 1 | 0 | 5 | 0 |
| 6 | (South Africa) | MF | MacBeth Sibaya | 2 | 0 | 0 | 0 | 2 | 0 |
| 7 | (Argentina) | FW | Alejandro Domínguez | 2 | 0 | 0 | 0 | 2 | 0 |
| 8 | (Norway) | MF | Jørgen Jalland | 1 | 0 | 1 | 0 | 2 | 0 |
| 9 | (Georgia (country)) | DF | Lasha Salukvadze | 1 | 0 | 0 | 0 | 1 | 0 |
| 10 | (Jamaica) | FW | Damani Ralph | 1 | 0 | 0 | 0 | 1 | 0 |
| 11 | (Czech Republic) | MF | Tomáš Čížek | 3 | 0 | 0 | 0 | 3 | 0 |
| 14 | (Russia) | MF | Andrei Konovalov | 4 | 0 | 0 | 0 | 4 | 0 |
| 15 | (Latvia) | MF | Vitālijs Astafjevs | 1 | 0 | 0 | 0 | 1 | 0 |
| 19 | (Uruguay) | MF | Andrés Scotti | 6 | 0 | 0 | 0 | 6 | 0 |
| 20 | (Russia) | FW | Igor Simutenkov | 0 | 0 | 1 | 0 | 1 | 0 |
| 21 | (Russia) | DF | Mikhail Sinyov | 4 | 0 | 0 | 0 | 4 | 0 |
| 23 | (The Gambia) | FW | Ebrima Ebou Sillah | 1 | 0 | 0 | 0 | 1 | 0 |
| 25 | (Russia) | DF | Rustem Khuzin | 2 | 0 | 0 | 0 | 2 | 0 |
| 27 | (Georgia (country)) | MF | Georgi Kinkladze | 1 | 0 | 0 | 0 | 1 | 0 |
| 28 | (Lithuania) | MF | Orestas Buitkus | 2 | 0 | 0 | 0 | 2 | 0 |
| 30 | (Russia) | FW | Aleksandr Bukharov | 1 | 0 | 0 | 0 | 1 | 0 |
| 32 | (Turkmenistan) | FW | Wladimir Baýramow | 2 | 0 | 0 | 0 | 2 | 0 |
| 77 | (Russia) | MF | Ansar Ayupov | 2 | 0 | 1 | 0 | 3 | 0 |
| 79 | (Turkmenistan) | GK | Pavel Kharchik | 2 | 0 | 0 | 0 | 2 | 0 |
| 98 | (Russia) | MF | Dmitri Vasilyev | 4 | 0 | 0 | 0 | 4 | 0 |
Players away on loan:
Players who left Rubin Kazan during the season:
| 17 | (Brazil) | FW | Rôni | 3 | 0 | 0 | 0 | 3 | 0 |
| Total | | | | 53 | 0 | 6 | 0 | 59 | 0 |
