= 2006 FC Rubin Kazan season =

FC Rubin Kazan
2006 season
- Chairman: Farit Khabriyev
- Manager: Kurban Berdyev
- Stadium: Central Stadium
- Premier League: 5th
- Russian Cup: Quarter-final (vs. CSKA Moscow)
- Russian Cup: Progressed to 2007 season
- UEFA Cup: First round (vs. Parma)
- Top goalscorer: League: Alejandro Domínguez (13); All: Alejandro Domínguez (17)

The 2006 FC Rubin Kazan season was the club's 4th season in the Russian Premier League, the highest tier of association football in Russia. They finished the season in fifth position, qualifying for the Second Round of 2007 UEFA Intertoto Cup and progressed to the Round 16 in the Russian Cup.

== Squad ==
As of match played 25 November 2006

No.	Name	Nationality	Position	Date of birth (age)	Signed from	Signed in	Contract ends	Apps.	Goals
Goalkeepers
1	Aleksandrs Koliņko	(Latvia)	GK	18 June 1975 (aged 31)	Rostov	2005		49	0
29	Nukri Revishvili	(Georgia (country))	GK	2 March 1987 (aged 19)	Torpedo Kutaisi	2006		5	0
79	Pavel Kharchik	(Turkmenistan)	GK	5 April 1979 (aged 27)	Neftekhimik Nizhnekamsk	2004			
Defenders
2	Baiano	(Brazil)	DF	28 June 1978 (aged 28)	Palmeiras	2006		24	1
3	Calisto	(Brazil)	DF	18 December 1975 (aged 30)	Bahia	2003		86	8
5	Andrei Fyodorov	(Uzbekistan)	DF	10 April 1971 (aged 35)	Baltika Kaliningrad	2000			
9	Lasha Salukvadze	(Georgia (country))	DF	21 December 1981 (aged 24)	Dinamo Tbilisi	2005		46	0
17	Lenar Gilmullin	(Russia)	DF	17 June 1985 (aged 21)	Youth Team	2003		20	1
21	Mikhail Sinyov	(Russia)	DF	21 June 1972 (aged 34)	Torpedo-ZIL Moscow	2002			
25	Rustem Khuzin	(Russia)	DF	30 January 1972 (aged 34)	Amkar Perm	2005			
31	Gabriel	(Brazil)	DF	4 August 1981 (aged 25)	União de Leiria	2006	2009	17	0
42	Mikhail Bagayev	(Russia)	DF	28 February 1985 (aged 21)	Moscow	2006		0	0
45	Irek Ganiyev	(Russia)	DF	16 January 1986 (aged 20)	Youth Team	2006		0	0
Midfielders
6	MacBeth Sibaya	(South Africa)	MF	25 November 1977 (aged 29)	Rosenborg	2003		59	2
8	Jørgen Jalland	(Norway)	MF	9 September 1977 (aged 29)	Vålerenga	2005		42	3
11	Konstantin Skrylnikov	(Russia)	MF	16 July 1979 (aged 27)	Tom Tomsk	2006		8	0
14	Kang Sun-kyu	(South Korea)	MF	20 April 1986 (aged 20)	Konkuk University	2006		0	0
15	Aleksandr Ryazantsev	(Russia)	MF	5 September 1986 (aged 20)	Moscow	2006		18	0
18	Dzhambulad Bazayev	(Russia)	MF	18 August 1979 (aged 27)	Alania Vladikavkaz	2006		19	3
19	Andrés Scotti	(Uruguay)	MF	14 December 1975 (aged 30)	Nacional	2003		96	13
20	Marat Bikmaev	(Uzbekistan)	MF	1 January 1986 (aged 20)	Krylia Sovetov	2006		1	1
22	Aleksei Uvarov	(Russia)	MF	1 June 1981 (aged 25)	Krylia Sovetov	2006		3	0
26	Alexandru Gațcan	(Moldova)	MF	27 March 1984 (aged 22)	Spartak Chelyabinsk	2006	2008	27	2
27	Georgi Kinkladze	(Georgia (country))	MF	6 July 1973 (aged 33)	Anorthosis Famagusta	2005		13	2
28	Roman Shirokov	(Russia)	MF	6 July 1981 (aged 25)	Saturn Ramenskoye	2006		5	0
33	Marat Khairullin	(Russia)	MF	26 April 1984 (aged 22)	Youth Team	2006		0	0
35	Dmitri Shestakov	(Russia)	MF	26 February 1983 (aged 23)	Sportakademklub Moscow	2005		0	0
41	Andrei Kireyev	(Russia)	MF	6 July 1985 (aged 21)	Nosta Novotroitsk	2006		0	0
48	Vadim Afonin	(Uzbekistan)	MF	29 September 1987 (aged 19)	Traktor Tashkent	2006		0	0
51	Zurab Arziani	(Georgia (country))	MF	19 October 1987 (aged 19)	Saturn Ramenskoye	2006		0	0
77	Ansar Ayupov	(Russia)	MF	23 March 1972 (aged 34)	Chernomorets Novorossiysk	2004		64	5
81	Selim Benachour	(Tunisia)	MF	8 September 1981 (aged 25)	Vitória de Guimarães	2006	2009	17	4
98	Dmitri Vasilyev	(Russia)	MF	25 March 1977 (aged 29)	Shinnik Yaroslavl	2005		27	2
Forwards
7	Alejandro Domínguez	(Argentina)	FW	10 June 1981 (aged 25)	River Plate	2004		76	25
10	Damani Ralph	(Jamaica)	FW	6 November 1980 (aged 26)	Chicago Fire	2005		25	2
23	Mikheil Ashvetia	(Georgia (country))	FW	10 November 1977 (aged 29)	Rostov	2006		17	2
30	Aleksandr Bukharov	(Russia)	FW	12 March 1985 (aged 21)	Chernomorets Novorossiysk	2005		22	8
32	Wladimir Baýramow	(Turkmenistan)	FW	2 August 1980 (aged 26)	Metallurg Krasnoyarsk	2003		58	9
44	Andrei Zvagolskiy	(Russia)	FW	19 March 1984 (aged 22)	Irtysh Omsk	2006		0	0
46	Aleksandr Yarkin	(Russia)	FW	29 December 1986 (aged 19)	Dynamo Barnaul	2006		14	2
99	Kim Dong-hyun	(South Korea)	FW	20 May 1984 (aged 22)	loan from Braga	2006	2007	6	1
Away on loan
24	Walter García	(Argentina)	DF	14 March 1984 (aged 22)	San Lorenzo	2006	2009	5	0
Players that left Rubin Kazan during the season
4	Marat Makhmutov	(Russia)	DF	3 September 1975 (aged 31)	Torpedo Moscow	2004		19	1
12	Dmitri Chigazov	(Russia)	GK	29 June 1983 (aged 23)	Atyrau	2003			
62	Ilya Vorotnikov	(Kazakhstan)	DF	1 February 1986 (aged 20)	Irtysh Pavlodar	2006		0	0
85	Aleksandr Petukhov	(Kazakhstan)	GK	11 January 1985 (aged 21)	Atyrau	2003		0	0

=== On loan ===
Note: Flags indicate national team as defined under FIFA eligibility rules; some limited exceptions apply. Players may hold more than one non-FIFA nationality.

No. / Pos. / Nation / Player; 24 / DF / ARG / Walter García (at Catania)	No. / Pos. / Nation / Player

=== Left club during season ===
Note: Flags indicate national team as defined under FIFA eligibility rules; some limited exceptions apply. Players may hold more than one non-FIFA nationality.

No.	Pos.	Nation	Player
4	DF	RUS	Marat Makhmutov (to Ural Sverdlovsk Oblast)
12	GK	RUS	Dmitri Chigazov (to RSK Dižvanagi)

No.	Pos.	Nation	Player
62	DF	KAZ	Ilya Vorotnikov (to Alma-Ata)
85	GK	KAZ	Aleksandr Petukhov (to Tobol)

== Transfers ==
=== In ===
Date	Position	Nationality	Name	From	Fee	Ref.
Winter 2006	GK	(Georgia (country))	Nukri Revishvili	Torpedo Kutaisi	Undisclosed	
Winter 2006	DF	(Brazil)	Baiano	Palmeiras	Undisclosed	
Winter 2006	DF	(Russia)	Mikhail Bagayev	Moscow	Undisclosed	
Winter 2006	MF	(Georgia (country))	Zurab Arziani	Saturn Ramenskoye	Undisclosed	
Winter 2006	MF	(South Korea)	Kang Sun-kyu	Konkuk University	Undisclosed	
Winter 2006	MF	(Russia)	Dzhambulad Bazayev	Alania Vladikavkaz	Undisclosed	
Winter 2006	MF	(Russia)	Andrei Kireyev	Nosta Novotroitsk	Undisclosed	
Winter 2006	MF	(Russia)	Aleksandr Ryazantsev	Moscow	Undisclosed	
Winter 2006	MF	(Russia)	Roman Shirokov	Saturn Ramenskoye	Undisclosed	
Winter 2006	MF	(Russia)	Konstantin Skrylnikov	Tom Tomsk	Undisclosed	
Winter 2006	MF	(Russia)	Aleksei Uvarov	Arsenal Kyiv	Undisclosed	
Winter 2006	MF	(Uzbekistan)	Vadim Afonin	Traktor Tashkent	Undisclosed	
Winter 2006	MF	(Uzbekistan)	Marat Bikmaev	Krylia Sovetov	Undisclosed	
Winter 2006	FW	(Georgia (country))	Mikheil Ashvetia	Rostov	Undisclosed	
Winter 2006	FW	(Russia)	Andrei Zvagolskiy	Irtysh Omsk	Undisclosed	
Winter 2006	FW	(Russia)	Aleksandr Yarkin	Dynamo Barnaul	Undisclosed	
14 February 2006	DF	(Argentina)	Walter García	San Lorenzo	Undisclosed	
14 February 2006	MF	(Moldova)	Alexandru Gațcan	Spartak Chelyabinsk	Undisclosed	
29 June 2006	DF	(Brazil)	Gabriel	União de Leiria	Undisclosed	
Summer 2006	MF	(Tunisia)	Selim Benachour	Vitória de Guimarães	Undisclosed	

=== Loans in ===
Date from	Position	Nationality	Name	To	Date to	Ref.
2 September 2006	FW	(South Korea)	Kim Dong-hyun	Braga	Summer 20017	

=== Out ===
Date	Position	Nationality	Name	To	Fee	Ref.
Summer 2006	GK	(Kazakhstan)	Aleksandr Petukhov	Tobol	Undisclosed	
Summer 2006	GK	(Russia)	Dmitri Chigazov	RSK Dižvanagi	Undisclosed	
Summer 2006	DF	(Kazakhstan)	Ilya Vorotnikov	Alma-Ata	Undisclosed	
Summer 2006	DF	(Russia)	Marat Makhmutov	Ural Sverdlovsk Oblast	Undisclosed	
18 December 2006	FW	(Argentina)	Alejandro Domínguez	Zenit St. Petersburg	Undisclosed	

=== Loans out ===
Date from	Position	Nationality	Name	To	Date to	Ref.
Summer 2006	DF	(Argentina)	Walter García	Catania	Summer 2007	

=== Released ===
Date	Position	Nationality	Name	Joined	Date
Winter 2007	DF	(Brazil)	Baiano	Náutico	
Winter 2007	DF	(Russia)	Rustem Khuzin	Retired	
Winter 2007	MF	(Georgia (country))	Zurab Arziani	Olimpi Rustavi	
Winter 2007	MF	(Georgia (country))	Georgi Kinkladze	Retired	
Winter 2007	MF	(Russia)	Marat Khairullin	Aktobe	
Winter 2007	MF	(Russia)	Roman Shirokov	Khimki	
Winter 2007	MF	(Russia)	Konstantin Skrylnikov	Anzhi Makhachkala	
Winter 2007	MF	(Russia)	Aleksei Uvarov	Rubin-2 Kazan	
Winter 2007	MF	(Uruguay)	Andrés Scotti	Argentinos Juniors	
Winter 2007	FW	(Georgia (country))	Mikheil Ashvetia	Carl Zeiss Jena	
Winter 2007	FW	(Russia)	Andrei Zvagolskiy	Zvezda Irkutsk	

== Competitions ==
=== Premier League ===
==== Results by round ====
Round	1	2	3	4	5	6	7	8	9	10	11	12	13	14	15	16	17	18	19	20	21	22	23	24	25	26	27	28	29	30
Ground	H	A	H	A	H	A	H	H	A	H	A	H	A	H	A	A	H	A	H	A	H	A	A	H	A	H	A	H	A	H
Result	W	D	W	L	W	D	W	W	L	D	D	D	L	L	D	L	W	L	D	L	L	L	W	W	W	L	W	W	W	W

Updated to match(es) played on 26 November 2006. Source: See Results
A = Away; H = Home; W = Win; D = Draw; L = Loss

==== Results ====
19 March 2006 1	Rubin Kazan	2 – 1	Rostov	Kazan
14:00 MSK (UTC+3)	Domínguez 50' (pen.) (yellow card) 90'; Jalland 80'; Calisto (yellow card) 90+'	Report	Pérez (yellow card) 10'; Kalachev (yellow card) 22'; Osinov 30' (pen.); Biletskyi (yellow card) 34'; Bochkov (red card) 56'; Tanasijević (yellow card) 58'	Stadium: Central Stadium; Attendance: 15,000; Referee: Igor Zakharov

27 March 2006 2	Krylia Sovetov	0 – 0	Rubin Kazan	Samara
17:00 MSK (UTC+3)	Bulyga (yellow card) 27' (yellow-red card) 59'; Temile (yellow card) 45'	Report	Ryazantsev (yellow card) 22'; Shirokov (yellow card) 57'; Salukvadze (yellow card) 83'	Stadium: Metallurg Stadium; Attendance: 16,500; Referee: Aleksei Nikolaev

2 April 2006 3	Rubin Kazan	1 – 0	Luch-Energia Vladivostok	Kazan
14:00 MSK (UTC+3)	Domínguez 64' (yellow card) 90' (yellow-red card) 90+'; Gațcan (yellow card) 86'; Jalland (yellow card) 90+'	Report	Arkhipov (yellow card) 48'; D.N.Smirnov (yellow card) 65'; Ajinjal (yellow card) 83' (yellow-red card) 90+'; Cherkes (yellow card) 90+'	Stadium: Central Stadium; Attendance: 8,200; Referee: Alexander Kolobaev

9 April 2006 4	Spartak Nalchik	3 – 1	Rubin Kazan	Nalchik
17:00 MSK (UTC+3)	Ngasanya 19' (yellow card) 61'; Korchagin 58'; Pylypchuk (yellow card) 75'; Poroshyn 85'	Report	Vasilyev 39'; Sinyov (yellow card) 50'	Stadium: Spartak Stadium; Attendance: 14,200; Referee: Yuri Baskakov

16 April 2006 5	Rubin Kazan	2 – 0	Spartak Moscow	Kazan
16:00 MSK (UTC+3)	Bukharov 27', 55'; Calisto (yellow card) 27'; Gațcan (yellow card) 30'	Report	Bystrov (yellow card) 9'; Mozart (yellow card) 54'; Stranzl (yellow card) 78'	Stadium: Central Stadium; Attendance: 25,000; Referee: Nikolai Ivanov

23 April 2006 6	Lokomotiv Moscow	4 – 4	Rubin Kazan	Moscow
16:00 MSK (UTC+3)	Loskov 34', 45+', 81' (pen.) (yellow card) 66'; Bikey (yellow card) 42'; Starkov 57'	Report	Scotti (yellow card) 4'; Bukharov (yellow card) 23'; Bazayev 33'; Gilmullin (yellow card) 41'; Domínguez 61', 68' (pen.), 74'; Sinyov (yellow card) 81'	Stadium: RZD Arena; Attendance: 10,238; Referee: Alexey Tyumin

29 April 2006 7	Rubin Kazan	1 – 0	CSKA Moscow	Kazan
14:00 MSK (UTC+4)	Domínguez (yellow card) 27'; Bukharov 34'; Sinyov (yellow card) 64'; Scotti (yellow card) 79'; Bazayev (yellow card) 80'; Gațcan (yellow card) 90'	Report	Gusev (yellow card) 64'	Stadium: Central Stadium; Attendance: 25,000; Referee: Vladimir Pettay

7 May 2006 8	Rubin Kazan	2 – 0	Moscow	Kazan
14:00 MSK (UTC+3)	García (yellow card) 64'; Bukharov 67', 90+'; Makhmutov (yellow card) 83'	Report	Melyoshin (yellow card) 15'; Jop (yellow card) 45'; Ivanov (yellow card) 63'	Stadium: Central Stadium; Attendance: 15,000; Referee: Alexei Kovalev

14 May 2006 9	Zenit St.Petersburg	1 – 0	Rubin Kazan	Saint Petersburg
20:00 MSK (UTC+4)	Anyukov (yellow card) 25'; Hagen (yellow card) 36'; Arshavin (yellow card) 40'; Denisov 42'	Report	Bazayev (yellow card) 45'; Calisto (yellow card) 63'; Gațcan (yellow card) 64'	Stadium: Petrovsky Stadium; Attendance: 18,000; Referee: Valentin Ivanov

12 July 2006 10	Rubin Kazan	1 – 1	Torpedo Moscow	Kazan
19:00 MSK (UTC+3)	Vasilyev 14'	Report	Piechna 8' (yellow card) 87'; Lentsevich (yellow card) 65'	Stadium: Central Stadium; Attendance: 12,000; Referee: Ildus Biglov
Note: Referee Sergey Timofeev was replaced by Fourth Official Ildus Biglov in the 33rd minute due to injury, Timofeev continuing as the Fourth Official.

19 July 2006 11	Dynamo Moscow	2 – 2	Rubin Kazan	Moscow
19:00 MSK (UTC+3)	Smertin (yellow card) 4'; D.Kombarov 31'; Semshov (yellow card) 34' (goal) 44'; Derlei (yellow card) 74'	Report	Scotti (yellow card) 14' (goal) 70'; Baiano 17' (yellow card) 44'; Calisto (yellow card) 52'	Stadium: Dynamo Stadium; Attendance: 5,000; Referee: Igor Egorov

26 July 2006 12	Rubin Kazan	0 – 0	Shinnik Yaroslavl	Kazan
19:00 MSK (UTC+3)	Sibaya (yellow card) 45'; Bazayev (yellow card) 79'	Report	Khazov (yellow card) 71'; Blyznyuk (yellow card) 81'	Stadium: Central Stadium; Attendance: 10,000; Referee: Aleksei Sergeyev

30 July 2006 13	Tom Tomsk	4 – 0	Rubin Kazan	Tomsk
16:00 MSK (UTC+3)	Kulchy 48' (yellow card) 50'; Yanotovsky (yellow card) 53'; Pogrebnyak 53', 64', 90+'; Kaleshin (yellow card) 74'	Report	Ryazantsev (yellow card) 73'	Stadium: Trud Stadium; Attendance: 13,000; Referee: Yuri Baskakov

5 August 2006 14	Rubin Kazan	0 – 3	Saturn Ramenskoye	Kazan
19:00 MSK (UTC+3)	Sinyov (yellow card) 26'; Gilmullin (yellow card) 32'; Vasilyev (yellow card) 43'; Scotti (yellow card) 64'; Yarkin (yellow card) 75'; Gabriel (yellow card) 79'	Report	Eremenko (yellow card) 28' (goal) 83' (pen.); Česnauskis 62', 72'; Obžera (yellow card) 76'; Fodrek (red card) 81'	Stadium: Central Stadium; Attendance: 8,000; Referee: Valentin Ivanov

13 August 2006 15	Amkar Perm	0 – 0	Rubin Kazan	Perm
16:00 MSK (UTC+3)	Vorobyov (yellow card) 76'	Report	Revishvili (yellow card) 89'	Stadium: Zvezda Stadium; Attendance: 14,000; Referee: Igor Zakharov

20 August 2006 16	Rostov	2 – 1	Rubin Kazan	Rostov-on-Don
18:00 MSK (UTC+3)	Osinov 11' (pen.); Kalachev 28'; Kruščić (yellow card) 72'	Report	Vasilyev (yellow card) 13'; Domínguez 37' (pen.); Gațcan (yellow card) 53'; Gabriel (yellow card) 63'	Stadium: SKA SKVO Stadium; Attendance: 6,000; Referee: Aleksei Nikolaev

27 August 2006 17	Rubin Kazan	2 – 1	Krylia Sovetov	Kazan
MSK (UTC+3)	Domínguez 29' (yellow card) 34'; Benachour (yellow card) 36' (goal) 38'; Sibaya (yellow card) 53'; Koliņko (yellow card) 90'	Report	Husin (yellow card) 33'; Mujiri 56' (yellow card) 63'	Stadium: Central Stadium; Attendance: 12,000; Referee: Mikhail Veselovsky

10 September 2006 18	Luch-Energiya Vladivostok	2 – 1	Rubin Kazan	Vladivostok
MSK (UTC+3)	D.A.Smirnov 7', 37'	Report	Sibaya (yellow card) 78'; Gilmullin 79'	Stadium: Dynamo Stadium; Attendance: 9,300; Referee: Mikhail Veselovsky

17 September 2006 19	Rubin Kazan	0 – 0	Spartak Nalchik	Kazan
19:00 MSK (UTC+3)	Gabriel (yellow card) 80'; Koliņko (yellow card) 90+'	Report	Serdyukov (yellow card) 59'; Skvortsov (yellow card) 67'; Jefthon (yellow card) 83'; Michkov (yellow card) 90'; Chikhradze (yellow card) 90+'	Stadium: Central Stadium; Attendance: 8,000; Referee: Alexander Gonchar

23 September 2006 20	Spartak Moscow	3 – 0	Rubin Kazan	Moscow
19:00 MSK (UTC+3)	Bazhenov (yellow card) 21'; Pavlyuchenko 45' (pen.) (yellow card) 84'; Bystrov 50'; Titov 54'; Jiránek (yellow card) 73'	Report	Fyodorov (yellow card) 3'; Gațcan (yellow card) 5'; Gabriel (yellow card) 87'	Stadium: Luzhniki Stadium; Attendance: 10,232; Referee: Igor Egorov

1 October 2006 21	Rubin Kazan	2 – 4	Lokomotiv Moscow	Kazan
MSK (UTC+3)	Baýramow 6', 52' (yellow card) 15'; Domínguez (yellow card) 57'; Baiano (yellow card) 64'; Fyodorov (yellow card) 73'; Gațcan (yellow card) 86'	Report	Izmailov (yellow card) 17'; Sychev 28'; Loskov 32', 64' (pen.); Traoré (yellow card) 78'; Gurenko (yellow card) 88'; Bilyaletdinov 89'	Stadium: Central Stadium; Attendance: 12,000; Referee: Stanislav Sukhina

14 October 2006 22	CSKA Moscow	2 – 1	Rubin Kazan	Moscow
18:00 MSK (UTC+4)	V.Berezutski (yellow card) 59'; Zhirkov 67'; Dudu 71'; Aldonin (yellow card) 85'; Taranov (yellow card) 90'; Salugin (yellow card) 90'	Report	Baýramow (yellow card) 32'; Benachour 34' (yellow card) 63'; Vasilyev (yellow card) 48'; Calisto (yellow card) 61'; Gabriel (yellow card) 73'	Stadium: Dynamo Stadium; Attendance: 6,500; Referee: Aleksandr Gonchar

22 October 2006 23	Moscow	0 – 5	Rubin Kazan	Moscow
16:00 MSK (UTC+3)	Melyoshin (yellow card) 10'; Barrientos (yellow card) 44'	Report	Sibaya 4'; Domínguez 7', 32', 53'; Calisto 39'	Stadium: Eduard Streltsov Stadium; Attendance: 3,000; Referee: Eduard Malyi

25 October 2006 24	Rubin Kazan	3 – 0	Zenit St.Petersburg	Kazan
18:00 MSK (UTC+4)	Domínguez 9', 77' (pen.) (yellow card) 57'; Benachour (yellow card) 65' (goal) 67'; Gilmullin (yellow card) 72'; Ayupov (yellow card) 74'	Report	Hagen (yellow card) 41'	Stadium: Central Stadium; Attendance: 26,000; Referee: Mikhail Veselovsky

29 October 2006 25	Torpedo Moscow	1 – 2	Rubin Kazan	Moscow
17:00 MSK (UTC+3)	Stepanov (yellow card) 3'; Mamayev (yellow card) 19'; Zyryanov 90'	Report	Fyodorov (yellow card) 1' (yellow-red card) 77'; Gațcan 21'; Calisto 45'	Stadium: Luzhniki Stadium; Attendance: 5,000; Referee: Nikolai Ivanov

5 November 2006 26	Rubin Kazan	0 – 1	Dynamo Moscow	Kazan
16:00 MSK (UTC+3)		Report	Tochilin (yellow card) 6'; Derlei 15'; Smertin (yellow card) 39'	Stadium: Central Stadium; Attendance: 10,000; Referee: Alexander Evstigneev

8 November 2006 27	Shinnik Yaroslavl	1 – 5	Rubin Kazan	Yaroslavl
18:00 MSK (UTC+3)	Matić (penalty missed) 45'; Menteshashvili (yellow card) 48'; Kostić (yellow card) 75'; Bakoš 86'	Report	Jalland 3' (yellow card) 71'; Baiano (yellow card) 45'; Scotti 56', 76' (penalty missed) 76'; Kim 60'; Benachour (yellow card) 77'; Yarkin 84'	Stadium: Shinnik Stadium; Attendance: 1,500; Referee: Igor Zakharov

12 November 2006 28	Rubin Kazan	2 – 0	Tom Tomsk	Kazan
MSK (UTC+3)	Sinyov (yellow card) 7'; Calisto 41'; Domínguez (yellow card) 51' (goal) 78'	Report	Mladenov (yellow card) 50'; Pogrebnyak (yellow card) 59'; Bugayev (yellow card) 71' (yellow-red card) 84'	Stadium: Central Stadium; Attendance: 8,000; Referee: Igor Zakharov

18 November 2006 29	Saturn Ramenskoye	1 – 2	Rubin Kazan	Ramenskoye
14:00 MSK (UTC+3)	Vukčević (yellow card) 24'; Petráš (yellow card) 62'; Jakubko 65'; Eremenko (yellow card) 80'	Report	Ayupov 39' (pen.), 69' (pen.); Jalland (yellow card) 40'; Gilmullin (yellow card) 62'; Sinyov (yellow card) 65'	Stadium: Saturn Stadium; Attendance: 8,000; Referee: Nikolai Ivanov

26 November 2006 30	Rubin Kazan	1 – 0	Amkar Perm	Kazan
16:00 MSK (UTC+3)	Fyodorov (yellow card) 30'; Scotti (yellow card) 58'; Calisto 72'	Report	Lavrik (yellow card) 27'; Alikin (yellow card) 50'; Popov (yellow card) 71'; Kobenko (yellow card) 78'	Stadium: Central Stadium; Attendance: 8,000

==== League table ====
Pos	Team	Pld	W	D	L	GF	GA	GD	Pts	Qualification or relegation
1	CSKA Moscow (C)	30	17	7	6	47	28	+19	58	2007–08 UEFA Champions League Group stage
2	Spartak Moscow	30	15	13	2	60	36	+24	58	2007–08 UEFA Champions League Third qualifying round
3	Lokomotiv Moscow	30	15	8	7	47	34	+13	53	2007–08 UEFA Cup First round (Note: Qualified as the winner of 2006–07 Russian Cup.)
4	Zenit St. Petersburg	30	13	11	6	42	30	+12	50	UEFA Cup 2007-08 Second qualifying round
5	Rubin Kazan	30	14	7	9	43	37	+6	49	2007 UEFA Intertoto Cup Second round
6	FC Moscow	30	10	13	7	41	37	+4	43	
7	Luch-Energiya Vladivostok	30	12	5	13	37	39	−2	41	
8	Tom Tomsk	30	11	8	11	35	33	+2	41	
9	Krylia Sovetov Samara	30	10	8	12	37	35	+2	38	
10	Spartak Nalchik	30	10	8	12	31	34	−3	38	
11	Saturn	30	7	16	7	29	24	+5	37	
12	Rostov	30	10	6	14	42	48	−6	36	
13	Amkar Perm	30	8	11	11	22	36	−14	35	
14	Dynamo Moscow	30	8	10	12	31	40	−9	34	
15	Torpedo Moscow (R)	30	3	13	14	22	40	−18	22	Relegation to 2007 Russian First Division
16	Shinnik Yaroslavl (R)	30	1	8	21	17	56	−39	11	Relegation to 2007 Russian First Division

Source: RFPL
Rules for classification: 1st points; 2nd matches won; 3rd goal difference; 4th head-to-head (points, matches won, goal difference, goals scored, away goals scored); 5th goals scored; 6th away goals scored; 7th drawing of lots
(C) Champions; (R) Relegated

=== Russian Cup ===
==== 2005-06 ====
5 March 2006 Last 16 1st leg	Rubin Kazan	0 – 1	Shinnik Yaroslavl	Moscow
14:00 MSK (UTC+3)		Report	Khazov 25'; Iordache (yellow card) 44'	Stadium: Luzhniki Stadium; Attendance: 500; Referee: Yuri Baskakov
Note: Match played in the Luzhniki Stadium, Moscow, instead of Rubin Kazan's regular Central Stadium in Kazan.

8 March 2006 Last 16 2nd leg	Shinnik Yaroslavl	0 – 2 (a.e.t.) (1 – 2 agg.)	Rubin Kazan	Moscow
14:00 MSK (UTC+3)	Budiša (yellow card) 18'; Mamaev (yellow card) 65'	Report	Sinyov (yellow card) 69'; Ayupov (yellow card) 81'; Bikmaev 83' (yellow card) 120'; Bazayev 109'	Stadium: Central Dynamo Stadium; Attendance: 500; Referee: Almir Kayumov
Note: Match played in the Central Dynamo Stadium, Moscow, instead of Shinnik Yaroslavl's regular Shinnik Stadium in Yaroslavl.

22 March 2006 Quarterfinal 1st leg	Rubin Kazan	1 – 1	CSKA Moscow	Kazan
18:00 MSK (UTC+3)	Baiano (yellow card) 18'; Calisto (yellow card) 21'; Bukharov 71'	Report	Gusev 3'; Odiah (yellow card) 77'; Dudu (yellow card) 90'	Stadium: Central Stadium; Attendance: 12,000; Referee: Sergei Fursa

12 April 2006 Quarterfinal 2nd leg	CSKA Moscow	4 – 1 (5 – 2 agg.)	Rubin Kazan	Moscow
14:00 MSK (UTC+3)	Jô 37', 68'; Vágner Love 42'; Olić 90'	Report	Baiano (yellow card) 25'; Scotti (yellow card) 28'; Gațcan 64'; Bazayev (yellow card) 73'; Baýramow (yellow card) 76'; Skrylnikov (yellow card) 81'	Stadium: Luzhniki Stadium; Attendance: 4,000; Referee: Aleksandr Yevstigneyev

==== 2006-07 ====
2 July 2006 Last 32 1st leg	Zenit-2 St.Petersburg	0 – 3	Rubin Kazan	Saint Petersburg
19:00 MSK (UTC+3)	Y.Berun (yellow card) 29'	Report	Khuzin (yellow card) 16' (yellow-red card) 53'; Domínguez 29', 77'; Baýramow (yellow card) 53'; Scotti 72'; Ayupov (yellow card) 77'	Stadium: Kirov Stadium; Attendance: 2,500; Referee: Eduard Malyi

20 September 2006 Last 32 2nd leg	Rubin Kazan	2 – 0 (5 – 0 agg.)	Zenit-2 St.Petersburg	Kazan
MSK (UTC+3)	Benachour 4'; Jalland (yellow card) 16'; Yarkin 78'	Report	Klass (yellow card) 49'; I.Sapin (yellow card) 81'	Stadium: Central Stadium; Attendance: 2,500; Referee: Aleksey Sergeyev

The Round of 16 games took place during the 2007 season.

=== UEFA Cup ===
==== Qualifying rounds ====
10 August 2006 1st leg	Rubin Kazan (Russia)	3 – 0	(Belarus) BATE Borisov	Kazan, Russia
MSK (UTC+3)	Bazayev 37'; Ashvetia 57', 68'; Gațcan (yellow card) 70'; Skrylnikov (yellow card) 86'	Report	Kobets (yellow card) 53'; Stasevich (yellow card) 65'; Zhavnerchik (yellow card) 79'; Bliznyuk (yellow card) 81'	Stadium: Central Stadium; Attendance: 8,000; Referee: Andrejs Sipailo (Latvia)

24 August 2006 2nd leg	BATE Borisov (Belarus)	0 – 2 (0 – 5 agg.)	(Russia) Rubin Kazan	Barysaw, Belarus
19:30 MSK (UTC+3)	Klimovich (yellow card) 57'; Stasevich (yellow card) 64'; Zhavnerchik (yellow card) 65'; Khagush (yellow card) 76'	Report	Domínguez 37', 44' (yellow card) 39'; Jalland (yellow card) 72'; Benachour (yellow card) 85'; Baiano (yellow card) 88'	Stadium: Haradski Stadium; Attendance: 2,700; Referee: Siniša Zrnić (Bosnia and Herzegovina)

==== First round ====
14 September 2006 1st leg	Rubin Kazan (Russia)	0 – 1	(Italy) Parma	Kazan, Russia
16:30 MSK (UTC+3)	Baýramow (yellow card) 33'; Gabriel (yellow card) 66'; Calisto (yellow card) 70'	Report	Kutuzov (yellow card) 34'; Cardone (yellow card) 39'; Dessena (yellow card) 70' (goal) 79'; Bucci (yellow card) 90'	Stadium: Central Stadium; Referee: Athanassios Briakos (Greece)

28 September 2006 2nd leg	Parma (Italy)	1 – 0 (2 – 0 agg.)	(Russia) Rubin Kazan	Parma, Italy
19:30 MSK (UTC+3)	Bolaño (yellow card) 47'; Paponi 49'; Pisanu (yellow card) 55'	Report	Domínguez (yellow card) 17'; Baiano (yellow card) 85'	Stadium: Stadio Ennio Tardini; Referee: Michael Weiner (Germany)

== Squad statistics ==
As of match played 26 November 2006

=== Appearances and goals ===
No.	Pos	Nat	Player	Total		Premier League		2005–06 Russian Cup		2006–07 Russian Cup		2006–07 UEFA Cup	
No.	Pos	Nat	Player	Apps	Goals	Apps	Goals	Apps	Goals	Apps	Goals	Apps	Goals
1	GK	(Latvia) LVA	Aleksandrs Koliņko	32	0	25	0	3	0	1	0	3	0
2	DF	(Brazil) BRA	Baiano	24	1	8+6	1	3+1	0	1+1	0	4	0
3	DF	(Brazil) BRA	Calisto	34	4	27	4	4	0	1	0	2	0
5	DF	(Uzbekistan) UZB	Andrei Fyodorov	16	0	11+3	0	1	0	0+1	0	0	0
6	MF	(South Africa) RSA	MacBeth Sibaya	22	1	17	1	1	0	1	0	3	0
7	FW	(Argentina) ARG	Alejandro Domínguez	30	17	21+2	13	2+1	0	1	2	3	2
8	MF	(Norway) NOR	Jørgen Jalland	28	2	11+7	2	3+1	0	2	0	2+2	0
9	DF	(Georgia (country)) GEO	Lasha Salukvadze	23	0	17+2	0	3	0	0	0	1	0
11	MF	(Russia) RUS	Konstantin Skrylnikov	8	0	2+2	0	0+1	0	1	0	2	0
15	MF	(Russia) RUS	Aleksandr Ryazantsev	18	0	8+7	0	1	0	0	0	0+2	0
17	DF	(Russia) RUS	Lenar Gilmullin	16	1	13+1	1	2	0	0	0	0	0
18	MF	(Russia) RUS	Dzhambulad Bazayev	19	3	9+5	1	3	1	1	0	1	1
19	MF	(Uruguay) URU	Andrés Scotti	38	4	29	3	3	0	2	1	4	0
20	MF	(Uzbekistan) UZB	Marat Bikmaev	1	1	0	0	0+1	1	0	0	0	0
21	DF	(Russia) RUS	Mikhail Sinyov	22	0	17+1	0	1	0	2	0	1	0
22	MF	(Russia) RUS	Aleksei Uvarov	3	0	0+3	0	0	0	0	0	0	0
23	FW	(Georgia (country)) GEO	Mikheil Ashvetia	17	2	11+3	0	0+1	0	1	0	1	2
25	DF	(Russia) RUS	Rustem Khuzin	1	0	0	0	0	0	1	0	0	0
26	MF	(Moldova) MDA	Alexandru Gațcan	27	2	19+2	1	2+2	1	0	0	2	0
27	MF	(Georgia (country)) GEO	Georgi Kinkladze	6	0	2+2	0	1	0	0	0	0+1	0
28	MF	(Russia) RUS	Roman Shirokov	5	0	4	0	1	0	0	0	0	0
29	GK	(Georgia (country)) GEO	Nukri Revishvili	5	0	4	0	0	0	1	0	0	0
30	FW	(Russia) RUS	Aleksandr Bukharov	13	6	3+5	5	1+3	1	1	0	0	0
31	DF	(Brazil) BRA	Gabriel	17	0	12	0	0	0	1	0	4	0
32	FW	(Turkmenistan) TKM	Wladimir Baýramow	34	2	16+8	2	4	0	2	0	4	0
46	FW	(Russia) RUS	Aleksandr Yarkin	14	2	0+11	1	0	0	0+2	1	0+1	0
77	MF	(Russia) RUS	Ansar Ayupov	23	2	12+5	2	2	0	0+2	0	2	0
79	GK	(Turkmenistan) TKM	Pavel Kharchik	3	0	1	0	1	0	0	0	1	0
81	MF	(Tunisia) TUN	Selim Benachour	17	4	12+1	3	0	0	1	1	2+1	0
98	MF	(Russia) RUS	Dmitri Vasilyev	20	2	15+1	2	0	0	1	0	2+1	0
99	FW	(South Korea) KOR	Kim Dong-hyun	6	1	2+2	1	0	0	0	0	0+2	0
Players away from the club on loan:
24	DF	(Argentina) ARG	Walter García	5	0	2+1	0	2	0	0	0	0	0
Players who appeared for Rubin Kazan but left during the season:
4	DF	(Russia) RUS	Marat Makhmutov	1	0	0+1	0	0	0	0	0	0	0

=== Goal scorers ===
Place	Position	Nation	Number	Name	Premier League	2005–06 Russian Cup	2006–07 Russian Cup	2006–07 UEFA Cup	Total
1	FW	(Argentina)	7	Alejandro Domínguez	13	0	2	2	17
2	FW	(Russia)	30	Aleksandr Bukharov	5	1	0	0	6
3	DF	(Brazil)	3	Calisto	4	0	0	0	4
3	MF	(Uruguay)	19	Andrés Scotti	3	0	1	0	4
3	MF	(Tunisia)	81	Selim Benachour	3	0	1	0	4
6	MF	(Russia)	18	Dzhambulad Bazayev	1	1	0	1	3
7	MF	(Norway)	8	Jørgen Jalland	2	0	0	0	2
7	MF	(Russia)	77	Ansar Ayupov	2	0	0	0	2
7	MF	(Russia)	98	Dmitri Vasilyev	2	0	0	0	2
7	FW	(Turkmenistan)	32	Wladimir Baýramow	2	0	0	0	2
7	MF	(Moldova)	26	Alexandru Gațcan	1	1	0	0	2
7	FW	(Russia)	46	Aleksandr Yarkin	1	0	1	0	2
7	FW	(Georgia (country))	23	Mikheil Ashvetia	0	0	0	2	2
14	DF	(Russia)	17	Lenar Gilmullin	1	0	0	0	1
14	DF	(Brazil)	2	Baiano	1	0	0	0	1
14	MF	(South Africa)	6	MacBeth Sibaya	1	0	0	0	1
14	FW	(South Korea)	99	Kim Dong-hyun	1	0	0	0	1
14	MF	(Uzbekistan)	20	Marat Bikmaev	0	1	0	0	1
Total					45	4	5	5	59

=== Disciplinary record ===
Number	Nation	Position	Name	Premier League		2005–06 Russian Cup		2006–07 Russian Cup		2006–07 UEFA Cup		Total	
Number	Nation	Position	Name	Booked	Sent off (straight red)	Booked	Sent off (straight red)	Booked	Sent off (straight red)	Booked	Sent off (straight red)	Booked	Sent off (straight red)
1	(Latvia)	GK	Aleksandrs Koliņko	2	0	0	0	0	0	0	0	2	0
2	(Brazil)	DF	Baiano	3	0	2	0	0	0	2	0	7	0
3	(Brazil)	DF	Calisto	5	0	1	0	0	0	1	0	7	0
5	(Uzbekistan)	DF	Andrei Fyodorov	5	1	0	0	0	0	0	0	5	1
6	(South Africa)	MF	MacBeth Sibaya	3	0	0	0	0	0	0	0	3	0
7	(Argentina)	FW	Alejandro Domínguez	8	1	0	0	0	0	2	0	10	1
8	(Norway)	MF	Jørgen Jalland	3	0	0	0	1	0	1	0	5	0
9	(Georgia (country))	DF	Lasha Salukvadze	1	0	0	0	0	0	0	0	1	0
11	(Russia)	MF	Konstantin Skrylnikov	0	0	1	0	0	0	1	0	2	0
15	(Russia)	MF	Aleksandr Ryazantsev	2	0	0	0	0	0	0	0	2	0
17	(Russia)	DF	Lenar Gilmullin	4	0	0	0	0	0	0	0	4	0
18	(Russia)	MF	Dzhambulad Bazayev	3	0	1	0	0	0	0	0	4	0
19	(Uruguay)	MF	Andrés Scotti	5	0	1	0	0	0	0	0	6	0
20	(Uzbekistan)	MF	Marat Bikmaev	0	0	1	0	0	0	0	0	1	0
21	(Russia)	DF	Mikhail Sinyov	6	0	1	0	0	0	0	0	7	0
25	(Russia)	DF	Rustem Khuzin	0	0	0	0	2	1	0	0	2	1
26	(Moldova)	MF	Alexandru Gațcan	7	0	0	0	0	0	1	0	8	0
28	(Russia)	MF	Roman Shirokov	1	0	0	0	0	0	0	0	1	0
29	(Georgia (country))	GK	Nukri Revishvili	1	0	0	0	0	0	0	0	1	0
30	(Russia)	FW	Aleksandr Bukharov	1	0	0	0	0	0	0	0	1	0
31	(Brazil)	DF	Gabriel	5	0	0	0	0	0	1	0	6	0
32	(Turkmenistan)	FW	Wladimir Baýramow	2	0	1	0	1	0	1	0	4	0
46	(Russia)	FW	Aleksandr Yarkin	1	0	0	0	0	0	0	0	1	0
77	(Russia)	MF	Ansar Ayupov	1	0	1	0	1	0	0	0	3	0
81	(Tunisia)	MF	Selim Benachour	4	0	0	0	0	0	1	0	5	0
98	(Russia)	MF	Dmitri Vasilyev	3	0	0	0	0	0	0	0	3	0
Players away on loan:
24	(Argentina)	DF	Walter García	1	0	0	0	0	0	0	0	1	0
Players who left Rubin Kazan during the season:
4	(Russia)	DF	Marat Makhmutov	1	0	0	0	0	0	0	0	1	0
Total				78	2	10	0	5	1	11	0	104	3
