= Quixabeira =

Municipality of Bahia, Brazil

Coordinates: 11°24′43″S 40°07′40″W

- Municipality
- Flag Coat of arms

- Country: Brazil
- Region: Nordeste
- State: Bahia
- Mesoregion: Centro Norte Baiano

Area
  - Total: 149,683 sq mi (387,677 km^{2})

Population (2020)
  - Total: 8,956
- Time zone: UTC−3 (BRT)
- Postal code: 44713-000
- Area code: 74
- Website: quixabeira.ba.gov.br

Quixabeira is a municipality in the state of Bahia in the North-East region of Brazil. With 8,956 inhabitants of estimated population, borders with five other municipalities: Jacobina, Capim Grosso, São José do Jacuípe, Várzea da Roça and Serrolândia.

== See also ==
- List of municipalities in Bahia
