= Parish Church of Saint Antony of Jacobina =

Church building in Jacobina, Brazil

- Igreja Matriz de Santo António em Jacobina
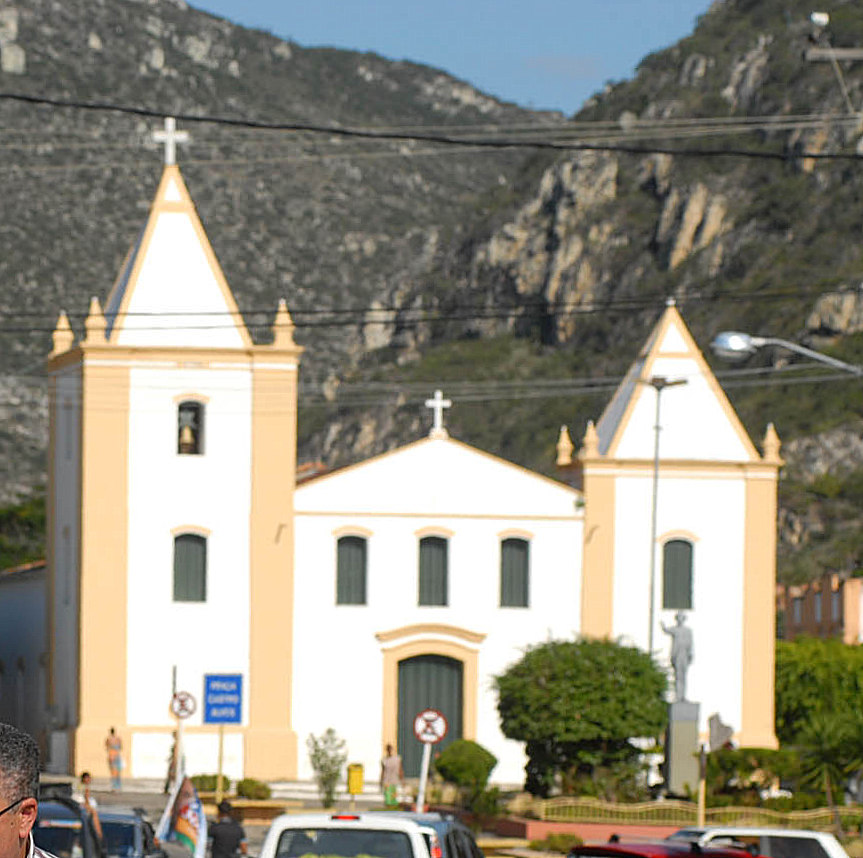
- Parish Church of Saint Antony of Jacobina

- Location of the Parish Church of Saint Antony of Jacobina in Brazil

Religion
- Affiliation: Catholic
- Rite: Roman
- Patron: Saint Anthony

Location
- Municipality: Jacobina
- State: Bahia
- Country: Brazil
- Interactive map of Parish Church of Saint Antony of Jacobina
- Coordinates: 11.18323074566549°S 40.509403874090644°W

Architecture
- Established: 1759
- Interior area: 724 square metres (7,790 ft^{2})

The Parish Church of Saint Antony of Jacobina (Portuguese: Igreja Matriz de Santo António em Jacobina) is an 18th-century Roman Catholic church in Jacobina, Bahia, Brazil. It was constructed in 1758 and is dedicated to Saint Anthony, and is now part of the Roman Catholic Diocese of Bonfim. It covers 724 square metres (7,790 ft^{2}). The Institute of Artistic and Cultural Heritage of Bahia listed the church as a state heritage site in 2002.

== Location ==
The Church of the Conception is located in the historic center of Jacobina. The town is built on a hilly area of the base of the Serra da Conceição, and the church is likewise built on high retaining walls. The structure volumetrically dominates the surrounding houses.

== History ==
The first church in Jacobina was the Chapel of Our Lord of Glory (also known as the Chapel of the Missions, Capela das Missões), which was built in 1706 to catechize the Payaya people. João da Madre de Deus, the second archbishop of Bahia, created the parish of Jacobina Velha in 1683 in the present-day district of Campo Formoso. Rivalries between the Garcia d'Ávila and Guedes de Brito families, the most powerful at the time, led to the dissolution of the parish. Arcebispo José Botelho de Matos created a new parish was created in 1758 in Casa da Ponte, now the town of Jacobina. The new parish church was built on land of the Guedes de Brito family in the historic center of the town. It was followed in 1759 by the construction of the Church of the Conception of Jacobina.

The tower on the left side of the church was built in 1895 under vicar Ágio Moreira Maia. Stones from the unfinished Church of the Remedies (Igreja dos Remédios). Renovations in 1922 significantly changed the structure. The lateral sacristies were closed in by screens. The baroque-style pediment of the facade was replaced with a pyramidal pediment identical to that of Church of the Conception of Jacobina. The exterior porches were covered. The old altars of the church were moved to new naves. The administration of the church, and others in Jacobina, was passed to the Order of Cistercians in 1938.

The structure, similar to the nearby Church of the Conception, has been substantially damaged by termites, notably of the altarpiece.

== Structure ==
The Parish Church of Saint Antony of Jacobina is built on a rectangular plan and covers 724 square metres (7,790 ft^{2}). The frontispiece is austere, with a central body, and a simple triangular pediment. The church has a single portals at center with three windows at the choir level. The structure has two towers, each with a portal at ground level. The tower at left is fully completed with a belfry and topped by a pyramid, the tower at left simply terminates in a pyramid. The nearby Church of the Conception of Jacobina has a similar set of towers, one with a belfry and the other without.

=== Interior ===
The interior consists of a central nave and chancel. The chancel is surrounded by a choir at left and right, and a sacristy behind the chancel. The nave has a corridor along its length at right and left, corresponding to the bell towers. There are lateral altars to either side of chancel arch. The altars have ornate baroque woodcarving.

== Protected status ==
The Institute of Artistic and Cultural Heritage of Bahia listed the Parish Church of Saint Antony as a state heritage site in 2002.

== Access ==
The church is open to the public and may be visited.
