= Church of the Conception of Jacobina =

18th-century Roman Catholic church in Bahia, Brazil

- Igreja de Nossa Senhora da Conceição de Jacobina
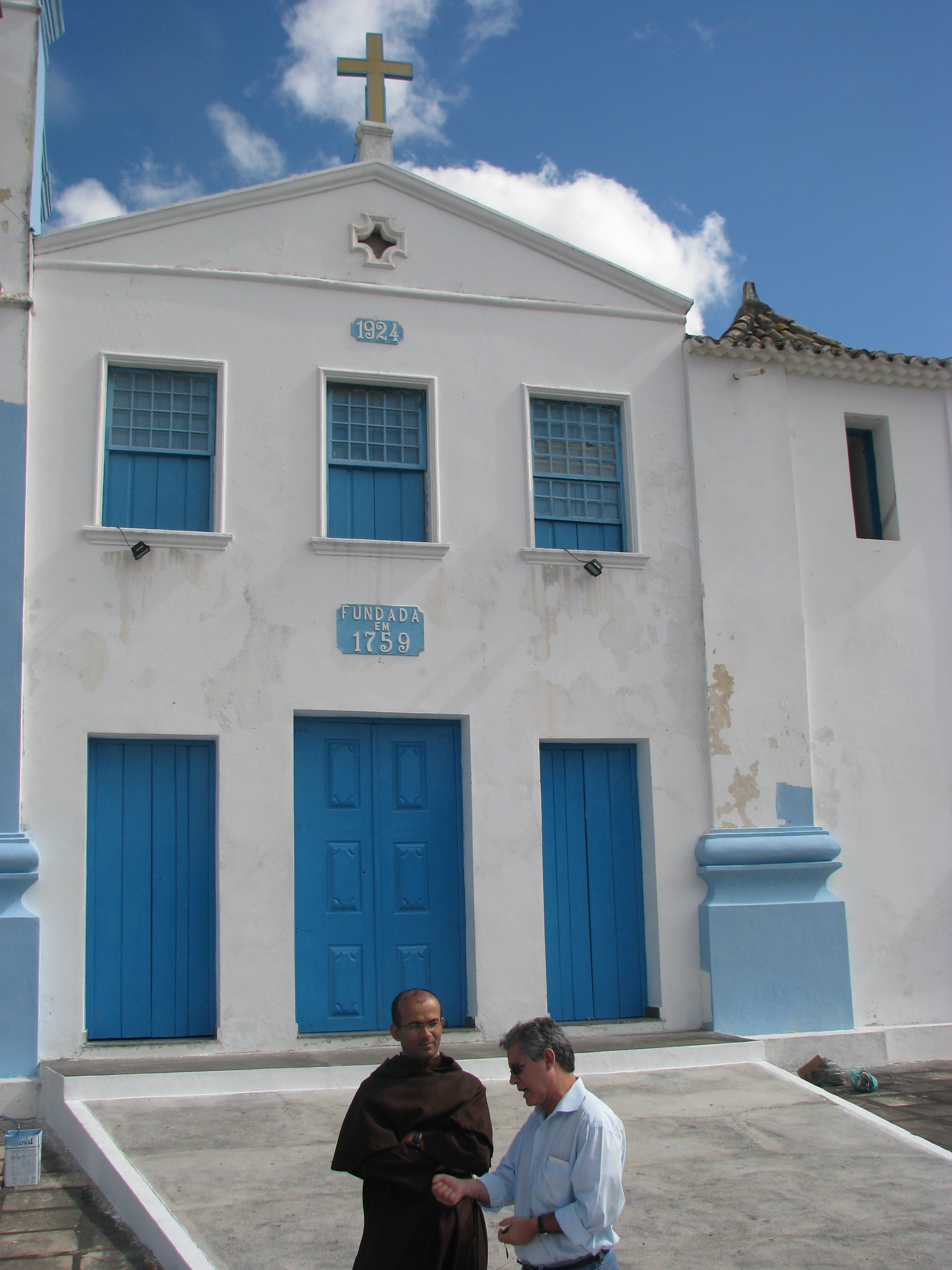
- Church of the Conception of Jacobina

- Location of the Church of the Conception of Jacobina in Brazil

Religion
- Affiliation: Catholic
- Rite: Roman
- Patron: Our Lady of the Conception

Location
- Municipality: Jacobina
- State: Bahia
- Country: Brazil
- Interactive map of Church of the Conception of Jacobina
- Coordinates: 11.182222°S 40.512222°W

Architecture
- Style: Neoclassical architecture
- Established: 1759
- Interior area: 486 square metres (5,230 ft^{2})

National Historic Heritage of Brazil
- Designated: 1972
- Reference no.: 490

The Church of the Conception of Jacobina (Portuguese: Igreja de Nossa Senhora da Conceição de Jacobina), or Chapel of the Conception of Jacobina is an 18th-century Roman Catholic church located in Jacobina, Bahia, Brazil. It was constructed in 1759 and is dedicated to Our Lady of the Conception. It covers 486 square metres (5,230 ft^{2}). The church was financed through donations made by the citizens of Jacobina in agreement with the Portuguese brotherhood responsible for the parish. It is now part of the Roman Catholic Diocese of Bonfim, and was listed as a historic structure by the National Institute of Historic and Artistic Heritage in 1972.

== Location ==
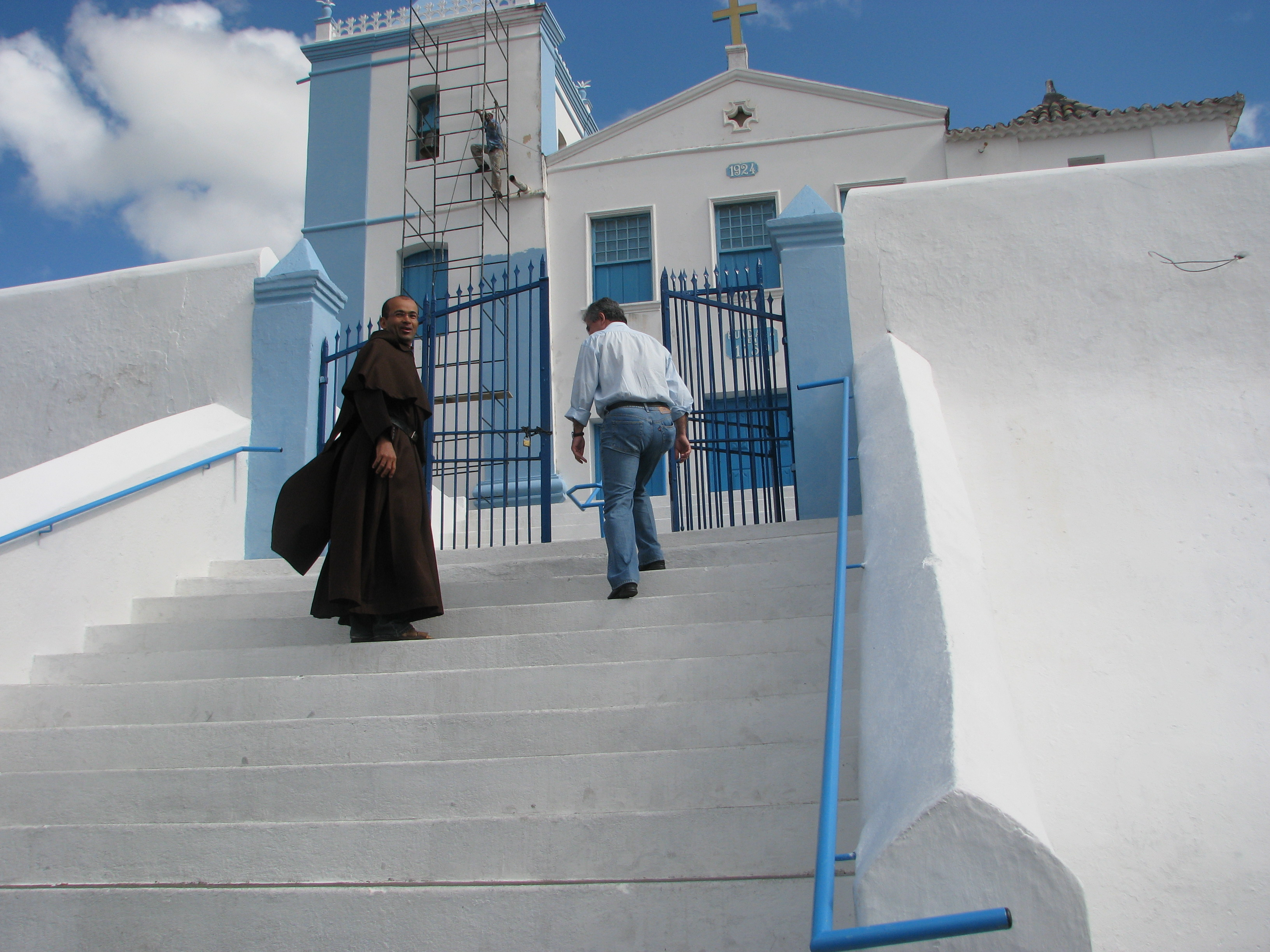
Staircase of the Church of the Conception of Jacobina

The Church of the Conception is located in the historic center of Jacobina. The town is built on a hilly area of the base of the Serra da Conceição, and the church is likewise built on high retaining walls. The structure volumetrically dominates the surrounding houses.

== History ==
The Church of the Conception was founded in the 18th century as part of a program of the Portuguese crown to build churches in the interior of Brazil. Jacobina was first served by the Chapel of Our Lord of Glory (also known as the Chapel of the Missions, Capela das Missões), which was built in 1706 to catechize the Payaya people. The Parish Church of Saint Antony of Jacobina (Igreja Matriz de Santo Antônio em Jacobina) was inaugurated in 1758. The Church of Our Lady of the Conception was inaugurated the following year as the Igreja da Conceição dos Homens Pardos, indicating that it was built by and for residents of mixed race. Approval for construction of the church was received from the Portuguese crown in 1758, it was inaugurated in 1759, and was funded by a Portuguese brotherhood and the residents of Jacobina. The parish church received an image of the Immaculate Conception directly from Portugal.

The design of the church resembles the 16th-century Chapel of São Brás (Capela de São Brás) in Santo Amaro. The Parish Church of Saint Antony of Jacobina and the Chapel of Our Lord of Glory were built with a similar design. The façade of the church was first restored in 1856, and the modified in a simplified neoclassical style in 1924. The administration of the church, and others in Jacobina, was passed to the Order of Cistercians in 1938.

The Church of the Conception fell into ruin by 1957, primarily due to heavy rain. It was restored under the direction of Dom Augusta Mesquita with funds from the population of Jacobina. The roof, towers, and monumental staircase were substantially rebuilt. The access stair to the pulpit was removed and was replaced by a restroom. The brick tile flooring of the nave was replaced by cement tile. The churchyard was originally of tamped earth, but was paved in local sandstone slabs this period. The church was closed in 2013 due to the risk of structural collapse; the altarpiece and choir were significantly damaged by the termites. The building closed for a decade and the congregation was moved to the Parish Church of Saint Anthony. It reopened in 2021.

== Structure ==
The Church of the Conception of Jacobina is built on a rectangular plan and covers 486 square metres (5,230 ft^{2}). The frontispiece is austere, with a central body, and a triangular pediment with an quatrefoil oculus at center. The church has three portals at center with three corresponding sash windows at the choir level. The structure two towers, each with a portal at ground level. The tower at left is fully completed with a belfry and topped by a pyramid, the tower at left simply terminates in a pyramid. The nearby Parish Church of Saint Antony of Jacobina has a similar set of towers, one with a belfry and the other without. The building is marked by the use of blue and white colors is not original to the structure, and is considered a neoclassical architectural style.

The church has a patio which surrounds the structure from all sides, and offers broad views of Jacobina. The portals open to a monumental staircase that opens to Praça Castro Alves, a broad public square.

=== Interior ===
The interior consists of a central nave and chancel. The chancel is surrounded by sacristies at left and right. The nave has a corridor along its length at right and a corresponding open porch at left. The lateral walls of the nave have niches for lateral altars, but they are now removed. The nave had a brick tiled floor, but it was replaced by cement tile in the mid-20th century. The wood carving of the church remains in the pulpits, in the chancel, and pelmets on the lateral chancel doors to the sacristies. The church has noted images of our Lady of the Conception and the Sacred Heart of Mary. The images and crucifix of the church are in silver.

== Protected status ==
The Church of the Conception of Jacobina was listed as a historic structure by the National Institute of Historic and Artistic Heritage in 1972 under process number 490.

== Access ==
The church is open to the public and may be visited.
