= Baiano (footballer, born 1978) =

Brazilian footballer

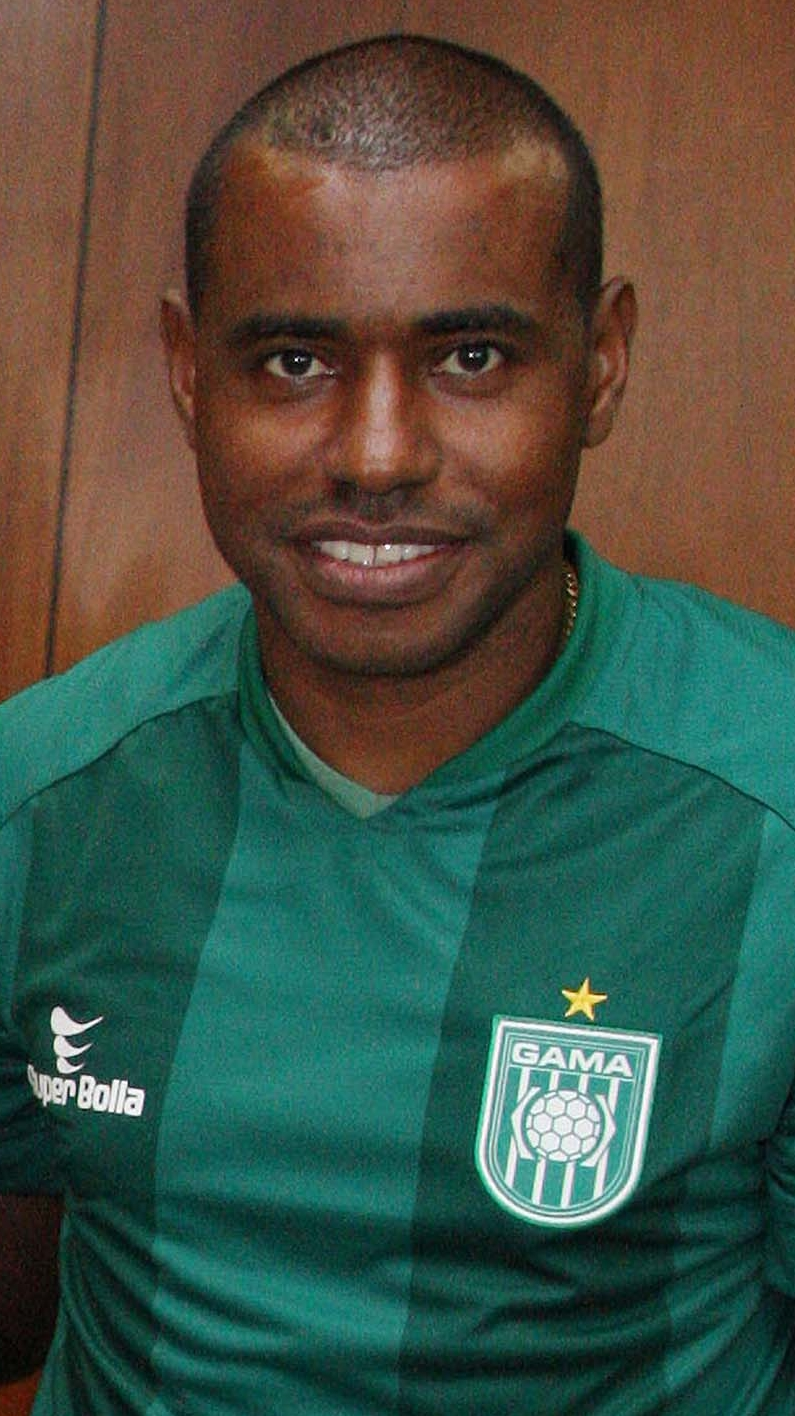
- Baiano with Gama in 2015

Personal information
- Full name: Dermival Almeida Lima
- Date of birth: 28 June 1978 (age 48)
- Place of birth: Capim Grosso, Brazil
- Height: 1.76 m (5 ft 9 1/2 in)
- Positions: Right-back; defensive midfielder

Team information
- Current team: Red Bull Bragantino U17 (assistant)

Youth career
- Santos

Senior career*
Years	Team	Apps	(Gls)
1996–2000	Santos	109	(4)
1999	→ Matonense (loan)		
1999	→ Vitória (loan)	25	(6)
2000–2003	Las Palmas	44	(5)
2001–2002	→ Atlético Mineiro (loan)	22	(1)
2003–2004	Palmeiras	70	(7)
2005	Boca Juniors	16	(2)
2005	Palmeiras	16	(2)
2006–2008	Rubin Kazan	14	(1)
2007	→ Náutico (loan)	5	(0)
2007	→ Santos (loan)	11	(0)
2008	Vasco da Gama	6	(0)
2009	Atlético Nacional	31	(1)
2010–2011	Paulista	32	(5)
2010	→ Guarani (loan)	30	(5)
2011–2012	Red Bull Brasil	14	(0)
2012–2014	Brasiliense	69	(13)
2015	Gama	22	(3)
2015	→ Vila Nova (loan)	7	(0)
2016	Brasília	14	(1)
2016	→ Ceilândia (loan)	9	(2)
2017	Gama	12	(1)
2017	Luziânia	4	(0)
2017	CFZ de Brasília		
2018	Real	1	(0)
Total		583	(59)

International career
1999–2000	Brazil U23	16	(2)

Managerial career
- 2018: Taguatinga (assistant)
- 2019: Taboão da Serra
- 2021: Paulista U20
- 2021: Paulista
- 2022: Paulista U20
- 2022: Red Bull Bragantino U15 (assistant)
- 2023–: Red Bull Bragantino U17 (assistant)
- * Club domestic league appearances and goals

Dermival Almeida Lima (born 28 June 1978), commonly known as Baiano, is a Brazilian football coach and former player who played as either a right-back or as a defensive midfielder. He is the current assistant coach of Red Bull Bragantino' under-17 team.

== Club career ==
Born in Capim Grosso, Bahia, Baiano was nicknamed after his native state, and was a youth product of Santos. He made his first team debut on 11 February 1996, starting in a 2–2 Campeonato Paulista home draw against Corinthians.

Baiano scored his first goal for Peixe on 2 May 1996, netting the opener in a 2–1 away loss to Novorizontino. He subsequently became a regular starter in the 1997 season, winning the 1997 Torneio Rio-São Paulo before losing his spot in the following campaign.

In February 1999, Baiano was loaned to Matonense for the 1999 Campeonato Paulista. In July, he moved to Vitória also in a temporary deal.

Back to Santos for the 2000 season, Baiano was a regular starter during the year's Paulistão before being transferred to Spanish La Liga club UD Las Palmas for a rumoured fee of US$ 2.75 million in August.

Baiano returned to his home country in 2001, after being loaned to Atlético Mineiro for one year. He returned to the Amarillos in May of the following year, with the club now in Segunda División.

On 25 July 2003, Baiano signed for Palmeiras until the end of the year, helping the club win the 2003 Campeonato Brasileiro Série B. On 27 December 2004, he was presented at Boca Juniors, but rescinded with the club in the following June and subsequently returned to Verdão.

Baiano moved to Russian side Rubin Kazan on 5 January 2006, but returned to Brazil in April 2007, joining Náutico on loan. On 3 August, however, he moved to his first club Santos also in a temporary deal until the end of the year.

Baiano rescinded his link with Rubin in July 2008, and signed a short-term deal with Vasco da Gama on 17 September of that year. He spent the 2009 season at Colombian side Atlético Nacional, before playing the 2010 Campeonato Paulista for Paulista.

On 24 April 2010, Baiano was announced at Guarani, being a regular starter as the club suffered relegation from the Série A. On 8 December, he returned to Paulista for the ensuing campaign, and subsequently joined Red Bull Brasil.

On 10 May 2012, Baiano signed for Brasiliense, and won the state championship the following year. He agreed to a deal with Gama on 7 November 2014, and moved to Vila Nova on 17 September 2015.

On 20 January 2016, Baiano moved to Brasília after the club paid his R$ 100,000 release clause to Gama. He subsequently represented clubs in the state, playing for Ceilândia, Luziânia, CFZ de Brasília and Real, and retiring with the latter in 2018, aged 40.

== International career ==
Baiano represented Brazil at under-23 level, also featuring in the 2000 Summer Olympics as the side were knocked out in the quarterfinals.

== Coaching career ==
In July 2018, Baiano became an assistant coach at Taguatinga. On 21 November, he was named head coach of Taboão da Serra for the upcoming season, but was sacked on 8 March 2019.

In 2021, Baiano returned to Paulista, now as head coach of the under-20 team. On 27 August, he was named head coach of the main squad, but returned to his previous role for the 2022 season.

On 17 March 2022, Baiano joined Red Bull Bragantino as an assistant of the under-15 squad. He subsequently moved to the under-17 team under the same role.

== Honours ==
Santos

- Torneio Rio–São Paulo: 1997
- Copa CONMEBOL: 1998

Brazil U23

- CONMEBOL Pre-Olympic Tournament: 2000

Palmeiras

- Campeonato Brasileiro Série B: 2003

Brasiliense

- Campeonato Brasiliense: 2013

Vila Nova

- Campeonato Brasileiro Série C: 2015
