= Sergei Savochkin =

Russian footballer and manager

Personal information
- Full name: Sergei Viktorovich Savochkin
- Date of birth: 8 February 1976 (age 50)
- Place of birth: Saransk, Russian SFSR
- Height: 1.83 m (6 ft 0 in)
- Position: Defender

Team information
- Current team: FC Saransk (manager)

Youth career
- FC Svetotekhnika Saransk

Senior career*
Years	Team	Apps	(Gls)
1994–1999	FC Svetotekhnika Saransk	188	(15)
2000–2005	FC Amkar Perm	107	(5)
2005	FC Nosta Novotroitsk	16	(1)
2006–2009	FC Mordovia Saransk	84	(5)

Managerial career
- 2015–2016: FC Mordovia Saransk (reserves assistant)
- 2017–: FC Saransk
- * Club domestic league appearances and goals

Sergei Viktorovich Savochkin (Russian: Серге́й Викторович Савочкин; born 8 February 1976) is a Russian professional football manager and a former player who manages FC Saransk.

== Club career ==
He made his debut in the Russian Premier League in 2004 for FC Amkar Perm.
