= Óscar Díaz (Paraguayan footballer) =

Paraguayan footballer (born 1984)

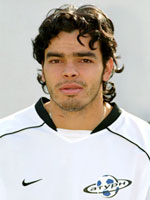

Personal information
- Full name: Óscar Nadin Díaz Gonzalez
- Date of birth: 29 January 1984 (age 42)
- Place of birth: Luque, Paraguay
- Height: 1.87 m (6 ft 1 1/2 in)
- Position: Defender

Senior career*
Years	Team	Apps	(Gls)
2003	12 de Octubre		
2004	Saturn Ramenskoye	23	(0)
2005	Rubin Kazan	5	(0)
2006	Deportes Quindío		
2007	Sportivo Trinidense		
2007	Cerro Porteño		
2008	León	1	(0)
2008	Presidente Hayes		
2009	12 de Octubre		
2010	América de Cali	13	(1)
2010	Deportivo Pereira	8	(0)
2011	3 de Febrero	3	(0)
2011	Herediano	0	(0)
2012	Independiente	2	(0)
2012	Inti Gas	32	(0)
2014	San Simón	9	(1)
2015	Universitario de Pando	6	(0)

International career
2003	Paraguay U20	4	(0)
- * Club domestic league appearances and goals

Óscar Nadin Díaz Gonzalez (born 29 January 1984), known as Óscar Díaz, is a Paraguayan former footballer who played as centre-back or wing-back.

== Club career ==
Díaz previously played for FC Saturn Ramenskoye and FC Rubin Kazan in the Russian Premier League.
