= Orestas Buitkus =

Lithuanian professional footballer

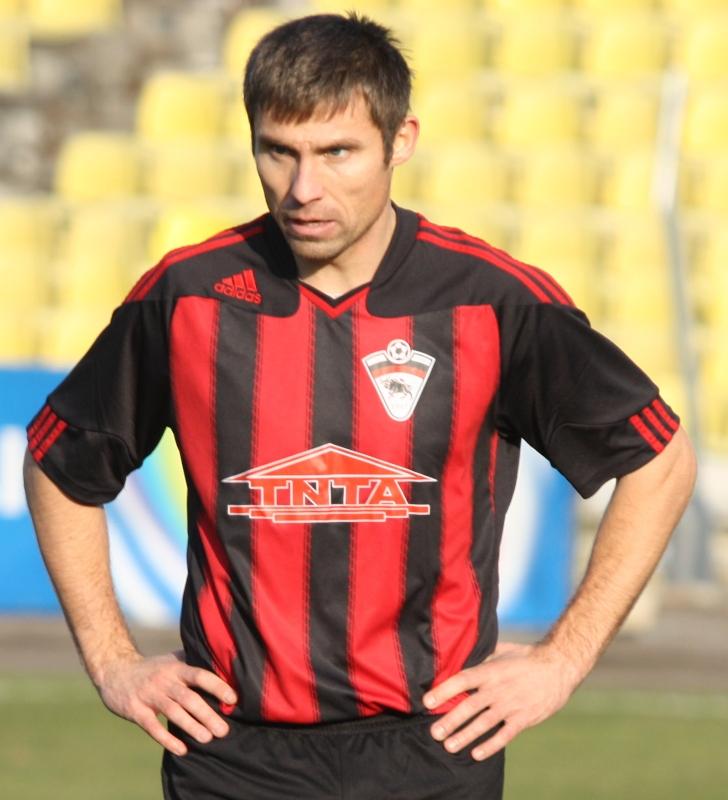

Personal information
- Date of birth: 11 April 1975 (age 51)
- Place of birth: Klaipėda, Lithuanian SSR, Soviet Union
- Height: 1.76 m (5 ft 9 1/2 in)
- Position: Midfielder

Senior career*
| Years | Team | Apps | (Gls) |
| 1996 | FBK Kaunas | 4 | (2) |
| 1997–1999 | FC Baltika Kaliningrad | 34 | (1) |
| 2000–2004 | Skonto FC | 100 | (24) |
| 2005 | Rubin Kazan | 10 | (1) |
| 2008 | Banga Gargždai | | |
| 2010–2012 | FK Tauras Tauragė | | |

International career
| 1996–2003 | Lithuania | 29 | (6) |
- * Club domestic league appearances and goals

Orestas Buitkus (born 11 April 1975) is a Lithuanian former professional footballer. A midfielder, he stands 1.76 m tall and weighs 74 kg.

As of May 2006 Buitkus has scored 6 goals in 29 appearances for the Lithuania national team. He has previously played for Rubin Kazan, Skonto Riga, Baltika Kaliningrad, FBK Kaunas and Banga Gargždai. He last played for FK Tauras Tauragė.
