= Andrei Smirnov (footballer, born 1980) =

Russian footballer

Personal information
- Full name: Andrei Viktorovich Smirnov
- Date of birth: 1 January 1980 (age 46)
- Place of birth: Moscow, Russia
- Height: 1.83 m (6 ft 0 in)
- Position: Defender

Youth career
- –1999: FC Dynamo Moscow

Senior career*
Years	Team	Apps	(Gls)
2000	FC Dynamo-2 Moscow	22	(0)
2001	FC Dynamo Moscow	0	(0)
2002–2003	FC Khimki	13	(0)
2004	FC Arsenal Tula	2	(0)
2004–2009	FC Vityaz Podolsk	140	(3)
2009	→ FC Avangard Podolsk (loan)	11	(0)
2010	FC SKA-Energiya Khabarovsk	25	(0)
2011–2012	FC Metallurg-Kuzbass Novokuznetsk	26	(0)
2012–2013	FC Ufa	18	(1)
2013–2014	FC Tekstilshchik Ivanovo	43	(2)
- * Club domestic league appearances and goals

Andrei Viktorovich Smirnov (Russian: Андрей Викторович Смирнов; born 1 January 1980) is a former Russian footballer.

== Club career ==
He made his Russian Football National League debut for FC Khimki on 17 May 2002 in a game against FC Dynamo Saint Petersburg.
