= Andrei Zvagolskiy =

Russian footballer

Personal information
- Full name: Andrei Gennadyevich Zvagolskiy
- Date of birth: 19 March 1984 (age 42)
- Place of birth: Omsk, Russian SFSR
- Height: 1.75 m (5 ft 9 in)
- Position: Forward

Senior career*
| Years | Team | Apps | (Gls) |
| 2002 | FC Vityaz Podolsk | 3 | (0) |
| 2003–2005 | FC Irtysh Omsk | 68 | (16) |
| 2006 | FC Rubin Kazan | 0 | (0) |
| 2007 | FC Zvezda Irkutsk | 18 | (4) |
| 2008 | FC Lada Togliatti | 25 | (6) |
| 2009 | FC Irtysh Omsk | 26 | (4) |
| 2010 | FC Okean Nakhodka | 27 | (2) |
| 2011 | FC Sakhalin Yuzhno-Sakhalinsk | 0 | (0) |
- * Club domestic league appearances and goals

Andrei Gennadyevich Zvagolskiy (Russian: Андрей Геннадьевич Звагольский; born 19 March 1984) is a former Russian professional football player.

== Club career ==
Zvagolskiy played one season in the Russian Football National League, appearing in 18 league matches for FC Zvezda Irkutsk.
