= Capim Grosso =

Municipality of Bahia, Brazil

- Municipality
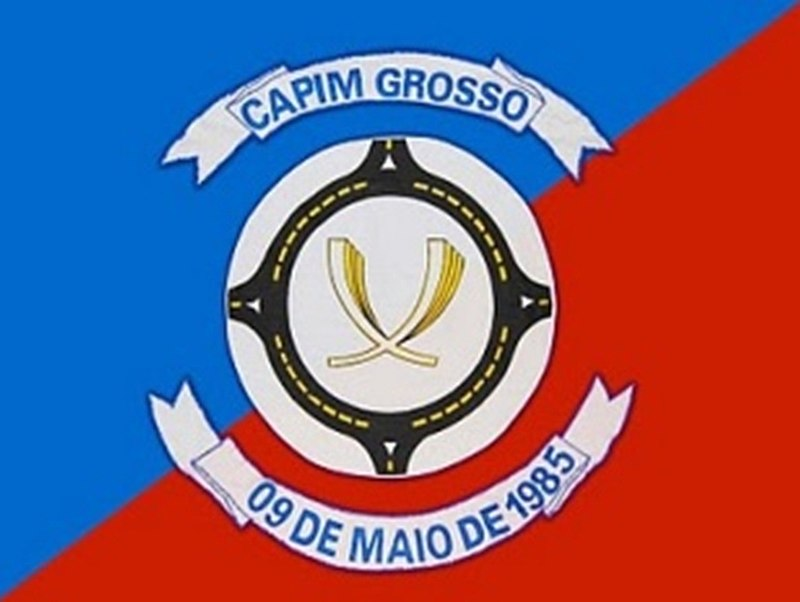
- Flag Coat of arms

- Location in Brazil
- Coordinates: 11°22′51″S 40°00′46″W
- Country: Brazil
- Region: Nordeste
- State: Bahia

Population (2020)
  - Total: 30,862
- Time zone: UTC−3 (BRT)

Capim Grosso is a municipality in the state of Bahia in the North-East region of Brazil. It was raised to municipality status in 1985, the area being taken out of the municipality of Jacobina.

== See also ==
- List of municipalities in Bahia
