= Aleksei Uvarov (footballer) =

Russian footballer

Personal information
- Full name: Aleksei Mikhailovich Uvarov
- Date of birth: 1 June 1981 (age 45)
- Place of birth: Krasnodar, Russian SFSR
- Height: 1.91 m (6 ft 3 in)
- Position: Midfielder

Senior career*
Years	Team	Apps	(Gls)
2000	FC Vagonnik Krasnodar		
2001–2002	Borussia Fulda	40	(2)
2003	Spartak Sumy	9	(0)
2003–2004	Chornomorets Odesa	18	(0)
2003–2004	→ Chornomorets-2 Odesa	7	(1)
2003	→ MFC Mykolaiv (loan)	1	(1)
2005	Arsenal Kyiv	12	(0)
2006	Rubin Kazan	3	(0)
2007–2008	Rubin-2 Kazan	30	(5)
2009	Chernomorets Novorossiysk	3	(1)
- * Club domestic league appearances and goals

Aleksei Mikhailovich Uvarov (Russian: Алексей Михайлович Уваров; born 1 June 1981) is a Russian former professional footballer.
