= Konstantin Skrylnikov =

Russian footballer

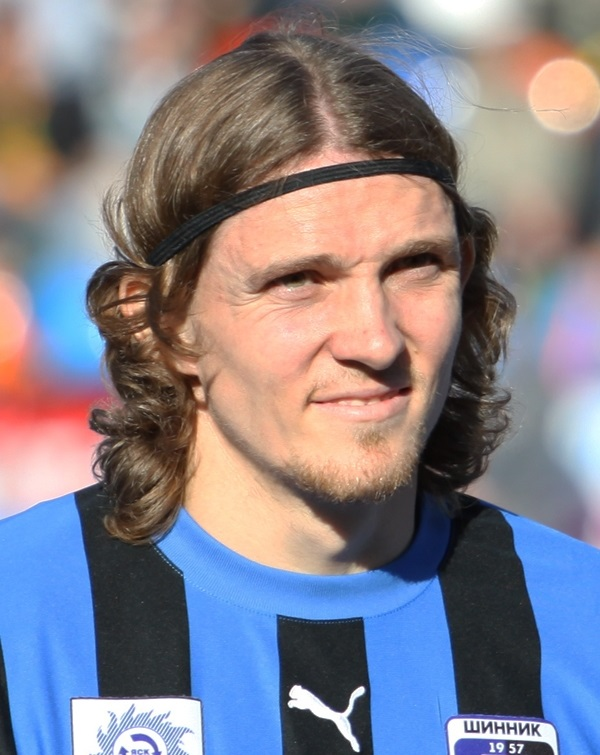

Personal information
- Full name: Konstantin Yevgenyevich Skrylnikov
- Date of birth: 16 July 1979 (age 47)
- Place of birth: Voronezh, Russia, Soviet Union
- Height: 1.80 m (5 ft 11 in)
- Position: Midfielder

Senior career*
Years	Team	Apps	(Gls)
2000	FC Kavkazkabel Prokhladny	23	(0)
2001–2002	FC Lada Togliatti	58	(4)
2003–2004	FC Rotor Volgograd	47	(0)
2005	FC Tom Tomsk	25	(0)
2006	FC Rubin Kazan	4	(0)
2007	FC Anzhi Makhachkala	20	(1)
2007–2010	FC Ural Sverdlovsk Oblast	105	(6)
2011–2012	FC Shinnik Yaroslavl	63	(8)
2013	FC Ural Sverdlovsk Oblast	5	(1)
2013–2014	FC Fakel Voronezh	26	(3)
2014	FC Vybor-Kurbatovo Voronezh	12	(0)
- * Club domestic league appearances and goals

Konstantin Yevgenyevich Skrylnikov (Russian: Константин Евгеньевич Скрыльников; born 16 July 1979) is a former Russian professional footballer.

== Club career ==
He made his debut in the Russian Premier League in 2003 for FC Rotor Volgograd. He played 2 games in the UEFA Cup 2006–07 with FC Rubin Kazan. Near the end of his career, Skrylnikov joined his hometown side FC Fakel Voronezh.
