= Serrolândia =

Coordinates: 11°26′S 40°18′W

- Municipality
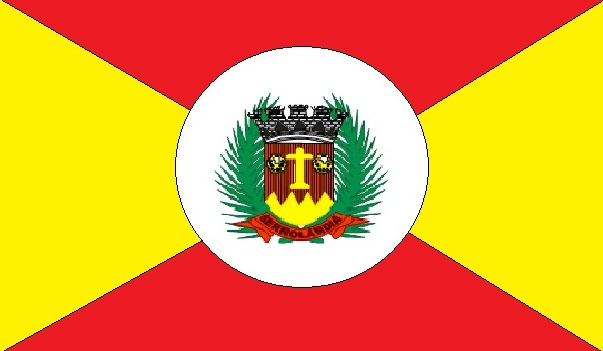
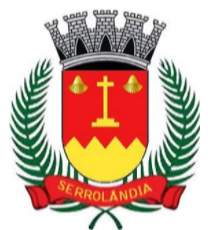
- Flag Coat of arms
- Interactive map of Serrolândia
- Country: Brazil
- Region: Nordeste
- State: Bahia

Population (2020)
  - Total: 13,446
- Time zone: UTC−3 (BRT)

Serrolândia is a municipality in the state of Bahia in the North-East region of Brazil.

== See also ==
- List of municipalities in Bahia
