= Andrei Panfyorov =

Russian footballer

Personal information
- Full name: Andrei Viktorovich Panfyorov
- Date of birth: 2 November 1980 (age 45)
- Place of birth: Moscow, Russia
- Height: 1.75 m (5 ft 9 in)
- Position: Midfielder

Youth career
- FC Torpedo Moscow

Senior career*
Years	Team	Apps	(Gls)
1998–2001	FC Torpedo Moscow	4	(0)
2002	FC Arsenal Tula	35	(1)
2003	FC Torpedo Moscow	3	(0)
2003	FC Volgar-Gazprom Astrakhan	16	(1)
2004	FC Torpedo Moscow (reserves)	12	(3)
2004	FK Liepājas Metalurgs	16	(1)
2005	FC Torpedo Moscow	16	(0)
2005–2006	FC Kryvbas Kryvyi Rih	6	(2)
2007–2009	FC SKA-Energiya Khabarovsk	84	(4)
- * Club domestic league appearances and goals

Andrei Viktorovich Panfyorov (Russian: Андрей Викторович Панфёров; born 2 November 1980) is a Russian former professional footballer.

== Club career ==
He made his debut in the Russian Premier League in 1998 for FC Torpedo Moscow.

== Honours ==
- Latvian Higher League runner-up: 2004.
