= Jørgen Jalland =

Norwegian footballer (born 1977)

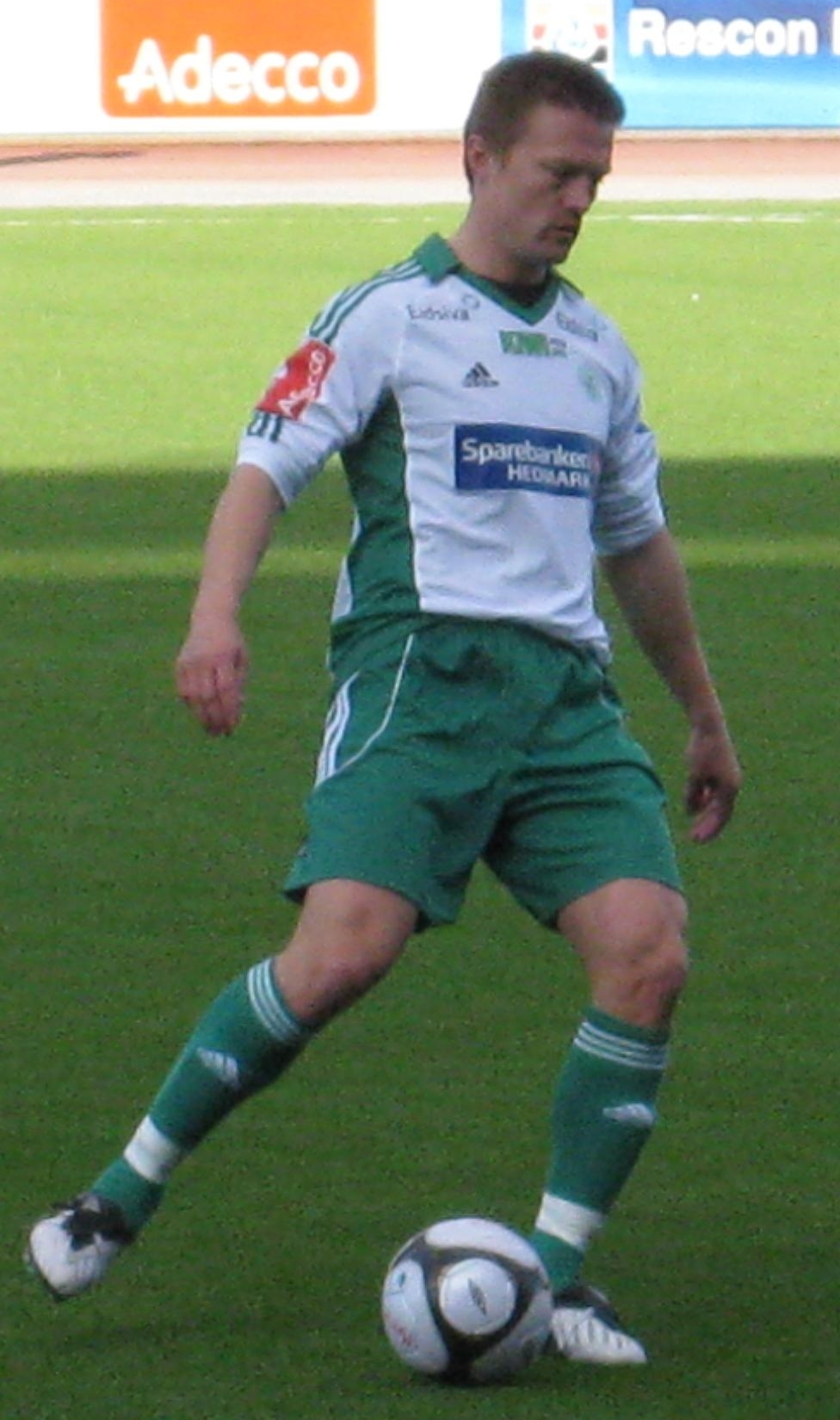

Personal information
- Full name: Jørgen Gunnar Jalland
- Date of birth: 9 September 1977 (age 49)
- Place of birth: Norway
- Height: 1.81 m (5 ft 11 in)
- Position: Midfielder

Youth career
- –1993: Teie

Senior career*
Years	Team	Apps	(Gls)
1994–2001	Ørn Horten	113	(27)
2002–2003	Sandefjord	45	(28)
2003–2004	Vålerenga	33	(2)
2005–2006	Rubin Kazan	29	(3)
2007–2009	Vålerenga	21	(4)
2009	HamKam		
2010–2014	Ørn Horten		
- * Club domestic league appearances and goals

Jørgen Jalland (born 9 September 1977) is a Norwegian former footballer.

== Career ==
In August 2003, Jalland joined Vålerenga from Sandefjord. In February 2007, Jalland returned to Vålerenga from Rubin Kazan.

Jalland was transferred to Hamarkameratene in March 2009 from Vålerenga. From 2005 to 2006, he played for the Russian club Rubin Kazan. In 2010, he rejoined Ørn Horten. He has also played for Sandefjord.

Jalland managed Ørn Horten until resigning in 2014.
