= Igor Zakharov =

Russian footballer and referee

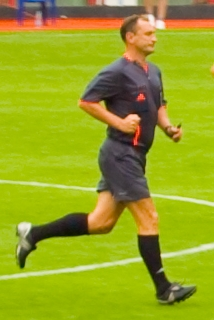

Personal information
- Full name: Igor Nikolayevich Zakharov
- Date of birth: 8 June 1966 (age 60)
- Place of birth: Kaluga, Russian SFSR
- Height: 1.78 m (5 ft 10 in)
- Positions: Defender; midfielder

Youth career
- FC Zarya Kaluga

Senior career*
Years	Team	Apps	(Gls)
1984	FC Zorkiy Krasnogorsk	22	(0)
1985–1990	FC SKA Khabarovsk	151	(0)
1991–1993	FC Okean Nakhodka	80	(3)
1993–1994	FC Luch Vladivostok	14	(0)
1994–1995	FC Krylia Sovetov Samara	19	(3)
1995	FC Zenit St. Petersburg	17	(1)
1996–1997	FC Gazovik-Gazprom Izhevsk	42	(3)
1997	FC Kuban Krasnodar	11	(1)
1998	FC Spartak-Chukotka Moscow (amateur)		
- * Club domestic league appearances and goals

Igor Nikolayevich Zakharov (Russian: Игорь Николаевич Захаров; born 8 June 1966) is a Russian former professional football referee and player.

== Club career ==
As a player, he made his professional debut in the Soviet Second League in 1984 for FC Zorkiy Krasnogorsk.

== Referee career ==
He had several memorable incidents in his referee career. On 25 July 2006 in the game between FC Dynamo Moscow and FC Moscow he gave FC Moscow a corner kick. Dynamo goalkeeper Sergei Ovchinnikov thought that FC Moscow player touched the ball last and aggressively attacked Zakharov, at one point grabbing his shirt. Ovchinnikov was sent off and received a long disqualification. That turned out to be the last professional game Ovchinnikov played. On another occasion a dog ran onto a field in the game Zakharov was officiating. Zakharov showed the dog the yellow card. On 27 July 2008 after a game between FC Shinnik Yaroslavl and FC Terek Grozny Shinnik wanted to test Zakharov for alcohol, claiming he refereed the game while drunk. Zakharov refused to go through the test.

He was an international FIFA referee from 2005 to 2008, retiring from refereeing after the 2008 season.
