= Jacobina =

Municipality of Bahia, Brazil

- Municipality
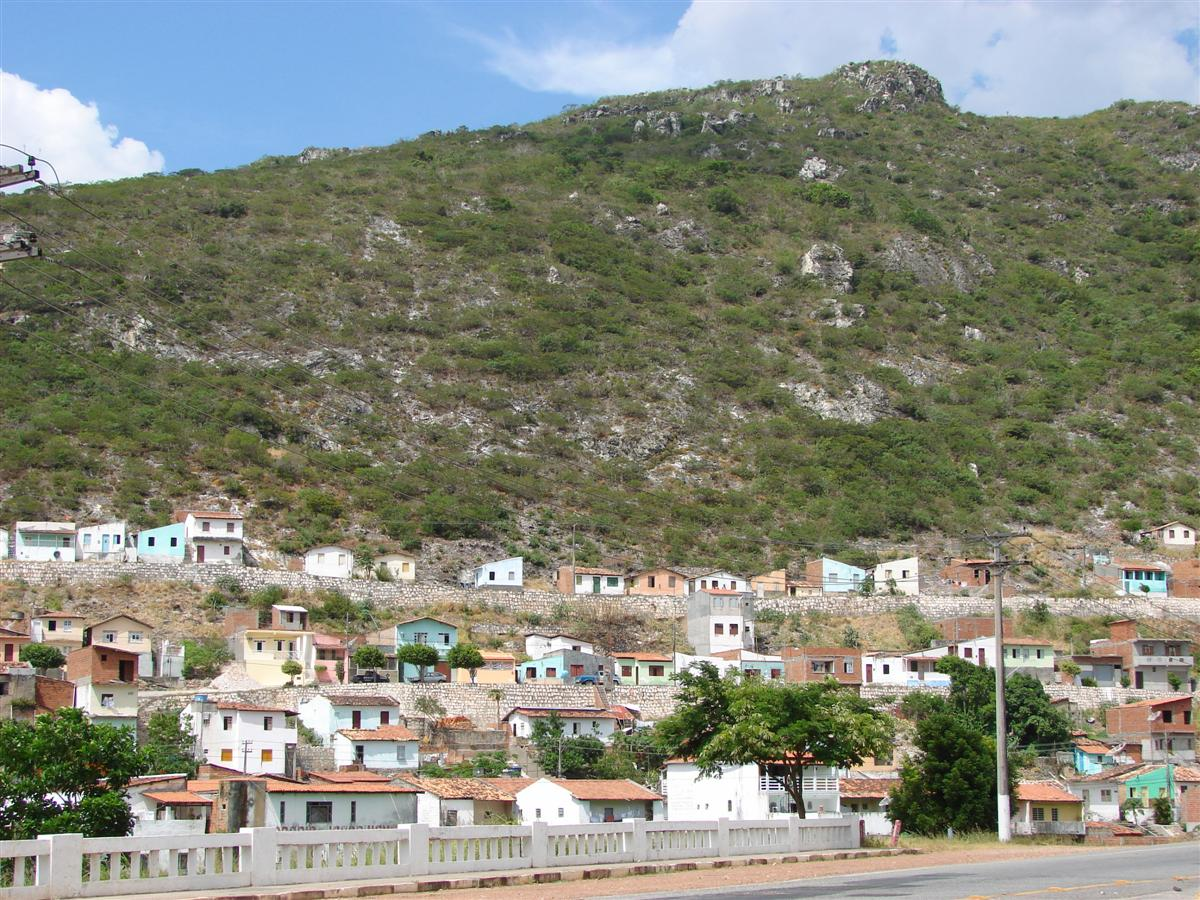
- View of Jacobina

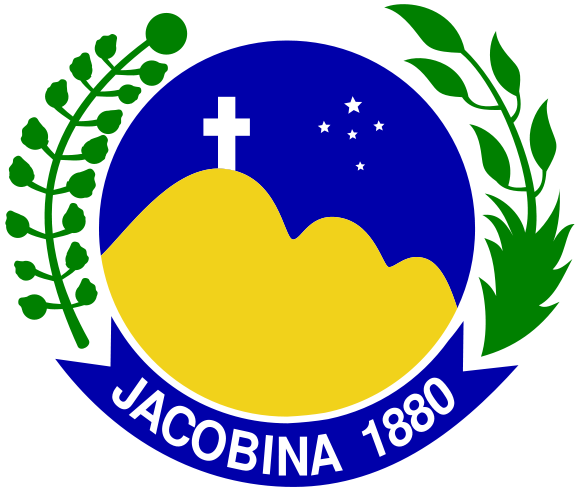
- Flag Coat of arms

- Location in Bahia
- Coordinates: 11°10′50.88″S 40°31′04.08″W
- Country: Brazil
- State: Bahia

Government
  - Mayor: Valdice Castro

Area
  - Total: 2,319.825 km^{2} (895.689 sq mi)

Population 2020
  - Total: 82,590
  - Density: 35.60/km^{2} (92.21/sq mi)
- Time zone: UTC−3 (BRT)
- Area/distance code: (00)55
- Website: jacobina.ba.gov.br

Jacobina is a city in the Centro Norte Baiano mesoregion of Bahia. It was founded July 28, 1722 and the population is 82,590. The town is surrounded by mountains, hills, lakes, rivers, springs, and waterfalls. Located in the northwest region of Bahia, in the extreme north of the Chapada Diamantina, Jacobina is 330 kilometers from Salvador and is also known as 'City of Gold', a legacy of the gold mines which attracted the pioneers from São Paulo in the early seventeenth century.

== History ==
Jacobina was first inhabited by the Payayá peoples. Residents of the municipality retain the memory of a chief, Jacó, and his companion, a wise woman named Bina. Portuguese settlers came to the area in the early 17th century. The descendants of Garcia D'Ávila, owners of the Casa da Torre, were granted land for cattle production in 1658. A second prominent family, the Guedes de Brito, were granted land in 1705, and arrived with colonists and enslaved Africans. António da Silva Pimentel and his wife Isabel Maria Guedes de Brito authorized the construction of a Franciscan missionary chapel on Bom Jesus da Glória, their large farm. The site of the chapel became the nucleus of the present-day town.

Gold was discovered in Jacobina in approximately the same period, supposedly by Roberto Dias. Mining was forbidden by Dom Rodrigo da Costa, Governor-General of Brazil from 1702 to 1705, but bandeirantes and other Portuguese colonialists moved to the region. There were 700 gold panners in the area by 1652. The gold rush led to the cultivation of crops and livestock production. Settlement along the banks of the Itapicuru Mirim River grew rapidly due to the arrival of more gold panners. The Portuguese Crown took great interest in the wealth that emerged from the mines. The Count of Sabugosa tasked Pedro Barbosa Leal with organizing the gold mines and towns of Jacobina and nearby Rio de Contas. The Vila Santo Antônio de Jacobina was established by a royal charter of Dom João V, dated August 5, 1720. The city seat was at the Mission of Nossa Senhora das Neves do Say, an indigenous village founded by Franciscan priests in 1697. The village included the parishes of Santo Antônio de Pambu and Santo Antônio do Urubu.

The city seat at Mission of Nossa Senhora das Neves do Say proved to be too far from the gold mines, so the city seat was moved to the Mission of Bom Jesus da Glória. Diamonds were discovered in Jacobina in 1732. Their discovery was hidden from the population due to the prohibition of diamond mining by the Portuguese. Diamonds were also discovered in other parts of the Chapada Diamantina in the 19th century, leading to an exodus of miners from the town. Cotton cultivation also began in the region in the 18th century. Jacobina was raised to city status in 1888. By the municipality had three districts: Jacobina, Riachão, and Saúde. Territorial divisions of Jacobina occurred in every decade of the 20th century. Many districts of Jacobina became new municipalities in Bahia. By 1993 Jacobina had five districts: Jacobina, Catinga do Moura, Itaitu, Itapeipu, and Junco.

== Historic structures ==
Jacobina is home to numerous colonial-period historic structures, many state or federally protected monuments.

- Chapel of Our Lord of Glory (Capela do Bom Jesus da Glória), also called the Church of the Mission (Igreja da Missão)
- Church of the Conception of Jacobina (Igreja da Conceição de Jacobina)
- Parish Church of Saint Antony of Jacobina (Igreja Matriz de Santo António em Jacobina)
- House at Praça Castro Alves, no. 61 (Casa da Praça Castro Alves, n° 61)
- Parochial House of Jacobina (House at Rua Professor Tavares, 108)
- Church of Santa Rosa de Lima (Igreja Avenida Santa Rosa de Lima)
- Church of São João (Igreja de São João)

== Climate ==
Climate data for Jacobina (1981–2010)
Month	Jan	Feb	Mar	Apr	May	Jun	Jul	Aug	Sep	Oct	Nov	Dec	Year
Mean daily maximum °C (°F)	31.9 (89.4)	32.3 (90.1)	31.6 (88.9)	30.1 (86.2)	28.3 (82.9)	26.5 (79.7)	26.3 (79.3)	27.4 (81.3)	29.6 (85.3)	31.5 (88.7)	31.7 (89.1)	31.5 (88.7)	29.9 (85.8)
Daily mean °C (°F)	26.1 (79.0)	26.3 (79.3)	25.9 (78.6)	24.9 (76.8)	23.4 (74.1)	22.0 (71.6)	21.4 (70.5)	22.1 (71.8)	23.8 (74.8)	25.3 (77.5)	25.8 (78.4)	25.8 (78.4)	24.4 (75.9)
Mean daily minimum °C (°F)	21.5 (70.7)	21.7 (71.1)	21.8 (71.2)	21.2 (70.2)	20.0 (68.0)	18.9 (66.0)	18.1 (64.6)	18.3 (64.9)	19.5 (67.1)	20.5 (68.9)	21.1 (70.0)	21.4 (70.5)	20.3 (68.5)
Average precipitation mm (inches)	104.5 (4.11)	67.9 (2.67)	136.8 (5.39)	82.1 (3.23)	45.9 (1.81)	42.2 (1.66)	36.7 (1.44)	33.6 (1.32)	21.8 (0.86)	30.2 (1.19)	83.8 (3.30)	101.1 (3.98)	786.6 (30.97)
Average precipitation days (≥ 1.0 mm)	6	5	9	8	7	8	8	7	5	4	5	5	77
Average relative humidity (%)	65.4	63.9	69.4	73.7	75.6	78.0	76.0	71.6	64.7	61.9	63.8	67.3	69.3
Mean monthly sunshine hours	242.5	219.8	220.3	201.0	176.5	153.7	178.1	202.2	217.0	233.3	213.2	220.5	2,478.1
Source: Instituto Nacional de Meteorologia
