= Dmitri Vasilyev (footballer, born 1977) =

Russian footballer (born 1977)

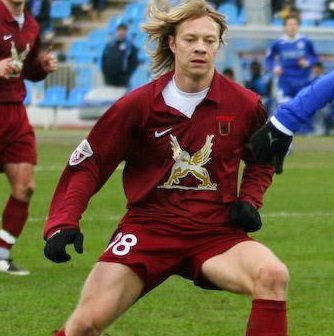

Personal information
- Full name: Dmitri Vladimirovich Vasilyev
- Date of birth: 25 March 1977 (age 49)
- Place of birth: Leningrad, Russian SFSR
- Height: 1.80 m (5 ft 11 in)
- Position: Midfielder

Team information
- Current team: Zenit-2 St. Petersburg (assistant coach)

Youth career
- Smena

Senior career*
Years	Team	Apps	(Gls)
1996–2000	FC Lokomotiv St. Petersburg	123	(10)
2000–2005	FC Shinnik Yaroslavl	94	(6)
2005–2008	FC Rubin Kazan	39	(2)
2008	FC Shinnik Yaroslavl	0	(0)

International career
2003	Russia	1	(0)

Managerial career
- 2010–2023: Zenit St. Petersburg (academy)
- 2023–2024: Zenit St. Petersburg (U19 assistant)
- 2025–: Zenit-2 St. Petersburg (assistant)
- * Club domestic league appearances and goals

Dmitri Vladimirovich Vasilyev (Russian: Дмитрий Владимирович Васильев; born 25 March 1977) is a Russian football coach and a former player. Unable to recover from a string of injuries, he finished his career in 2008 aged 31. He works as an assistant coach with Zenit-2 St. Petersburg.

== Career ==
A DYuSSh Smena graduate and a former captain of Rubin, Vasilyev is also a record holder as he is the first defender to score a hat-trick in Russian Premier League. Since retiring, he briefly appeared for amateur side FC Zapad in St. Petersburg football championship, playing three games.

== International career ==
Vasilyev played his only game for the Russia on 28 August 2003 in a friendly against Israel.
