= Marat Makhmutov =

Russian footballer

Personal information
- Full name: Marat Maksutovich Makhmutov
- Date of birth: 3 September 1975 (age 51)
- Place of birth: Moscow, Russian SFSR
- Height: 1.80 m (5 ft 11 in)
- Position: Defender

Senior career*
| Years | Team | Apps | (Gls) |
| 1992–1997 | FC Torpedo-d Moscow | 94 | (0) |
| 1995–1997 | FC Torpedo Moscow | 45 | (0) |
| 1997–1998 | FC Chornomorets Odesa | 10 | (0) |
| 1998–1999 | FC Shinnik Yaroslavl | 56 | (0) |
| 2000–2001 | FC Torpedo Moscow | 17 | (0) |
| 2001 | FC Shinnik Yaroslavl | 29 | (0) |
| 2002–2003 | FC Torpedo Moscow | 39 | (0) |
| 2004–2006 | FC Rubin Kazan | 18 | (0) |
| 2006–2008 | FC Ural Sverdlovsk Oblast | 72 | (0) |

International career
| 1995–1997 | Russia U-21 | 7 | (0) |
- * Club domestic league appearances and goals

Marat Maksutovich Makhmutov (Russian: Марат Максутович Махмутов; born 3 September 1975) is a Russian former professional footballer.

== Club career ==
He made his professional debut in the Russian Second Division in 1992 for FC Torpedo-d Moscow.

== Honours ==
- Russian Premier League bronze: 2000.

== European club competitions ==
- UEFA Cup 1996–97 with FC Torpedo-Luzhniki Moscow: 4 games.
- UEFA Intertoto Cup 1997 with FC Torpedo-Luzhniki Moscow: 3 games.
- UEFA Intertoto Cup 1998 with FC Shinnik Yaroslavl: 3 games.
- UEFA Cup 2000–01 with FC Torpedo Moscow: 1 game.
- UEFA Cup 2003–04 with FC Torpedo Moscow: 3 games.
