= Ansar Ayupov =

Russian footballer (born 1972)

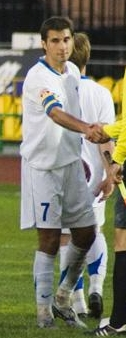

Personal information
- Full name: Ansar Maksutovich Ayupov
- Date of birth: 23 March 1972 (age 54)
- Place of birth: Moscow, Russian SFSR
- Height: 1.81 m (5 ft 11 1/2 in)
- Position: Midfielder

Team information
- Current team: Volgar Astrakhan (assistant coach)

Youth career
- SDYuShOR Moscow

Senior career*
Years	Team	Apps	(Gls)
1991–1992	Presnya Moscow	64	(4)
1992	Karelia Petrozavodsk	14	(2)
1993–1994	Asmaral Moscow	34	(1)
1994–1995	Lokomotiv Moscow	33	(1)
1995–1998	Twente	92	(3)
1999–2000	Dynamo Moscow	35	(0)
2001–2002	Kuban Krasnodar	47	(10)
2002–2003	Chernomorets Novorossiysk	39	(9)
2004–2007	Rubin Kazan	67	(5)
2008	Baltika Kaliningrad	32	(2)
2009	MVD Rossii Moscow	12	(0)
2009	MVD Rossii-2 Moscow (D4)		

International career
1993–1994	Russia U-21	5	(1)

Managerial career
- 2015–2017: Lokomotiv Moscow (U-21 assistant)
- 2017–2019: Lokomotiv-Kazanka (assistant)
- 2020–2022: Ural-2 Yekaterinburg (assistant)
- 2022–2023: Ural-2 Yekaterinburg
- 2024–: Volgar Astrakhan (assistant)
- * Club domestic league appearances and goals

Ansar Maksutovich Ayupov (Russian: Ансар Максутович Аюпов; born 23 March 1972) is a Russian football coach and a former player who is an assistant coach with Volgar Astrakhan.

== Personal life ==
His son Timur Ayupov is a footballer.
