= 2004 FC Rubin Kazan season =

FC Rubin Kazan
2004 season
- Chairman: Farit Khabriyev
- Manager: Kurban Berdyev
- Stadium: Central Stadium
- Premier League: 10th
- Russian Cup: Last 16 (vs. Lokomotiv Moscow)
- Russian Cup: Last 32 (vs. Khimki)
- UEFA Cup: Second qualifying round (vs. Rapid Wien)
- Top goalscorer: League: Rôni (5); All: Rôni (6)
- Highest home attendance: 16,000 vs Spartak Moscow (24 April 2004)
- Lowest home attendance: 3,500 vs Alania Vladikavkaz (11 November 2004)
- Average home league attendance: 8,600 (11 November 2004)

The 2004 FC Rubin Kazan season was the club's 2nd season in the Russian Premier League, the highest tier of association football in Russia. They finished the season in tenth position, were knocked out of the UEFA Cup in the Second qualifying round by Rapid Wien and reached the Last 16 of the 2003–04 Russian Cup and Last 32 of the 2004–05 Russian Cup.

== Squad ==
As of match played 11 November 2004

| No. | Name | Nationality | Position | Date of birth (age) | Signed from | Signed in | Contract ends | Apps. | Goals |
Goalkeepers
| 1 | Sergei Kozko | (Russia) | GK | 12 April 1975 (aged 29) | Torpedo-ZIL Moscow | 2002 | | | |
| 16 | Valeri Aleskarov | (Russia) | GK | 19 August 1971 (aged 33) | KAMAZ | 1997 | | | |
| 22 | Valeri Chizhov | (Russia) | GK | 14 April 1975 (aged 29) | Saturn Ramenskoye | 2004 | | 14 | 0 |
| 45 | Pavel Kharchik | (Turkmenistan) | GK | 5 April 1979 (aged 25) | Neftekhimik Nizhnekamsk | 2004 | | | |
| 85 | Aleksandr Petukhov | (Kazakhstan) | GK | 11 January 1985 (aged 19) | Atyrau | 2003 | | 0 | 0 |
Defenders
| 2 | Calisto | (Brazil) | DF | 18 December 1975 (aged 28) | Bahia | 2003 | | 23 | 1 |
| 3 | Sergei Kharlamov | (Russia) | DF | 22 June 1973 (aged 31) | Diana Volzhsk | 2001 | | | |
| 4 | Marat Makhmutov | (Russia) | DF | 10 April 1971 (aged 33) | Torpedo Moscow | 2004 | | 8 | 1 |
| 5 | Andrei Fyodorov | (Uzbekistan) | DF | 10 April 1971 (aged 33) | Baltika Kaliningrad | 2000 | | | |
| 9 | Andrei Streltsov | (Russia) | DF | 18 March 1984 (aged 20) | Spartak Moscow | 2003 | | 3 | 0 |
| 21 | Mikhail Sinyov | (Russia) | DF | 21 June 1972 (aged 32) | Torpedo-ZIL Moscow | 2002 | | | |
| 24 | Jiří Novotný | (Czech Republic) | DF | 7 April 1970 (aged 34) | Sparta Prague | 2003 | | 30 | 6 |
| 27 | Roman Sharonov | (Russia) | DF | 8 September 1976 (aged 28) | Metallurg Krasnoyarsk | 1999 | | | |
| 28 | Adam Petrouš | (Czech Republic) | DF | 19 September 1977 (aged 27) | Slavia Prague | 2004 | | 26 | 0 |
| 37 | Lenar Gilmullin | (Russia) | DF | 17 June 1985 (aged 19) | Youth Team | 2003 | | 0 | 0 |
| 44 | Andrei Kolesnikov | (Russia) | DF | 11 February 1984 (aged 20) | Dynamo Moscow | 2003 | | 0 | 0 |
Midfielders
| 6 | MacBeth Sibaya | (South Africa) | MF | 25 November 1977 (aged 26) | Rosenborg | 2003 | | 25 | 1 |
| 7 | Denis Boyarintsev | (Russia) | MF | 6 February 1978 (aged 26) | Nosta Novotroitsk | 2001 | | | |
| 11 | Tomáš Čížek | (Czech Republic) | MF | 27 November 1978 (aged 25) | Sparta Prague | 2003 | | 27 | 2 |
| 12 | Richard Dostálek | (Czech Republic) | MF | 26 April 1974 (aged 30) | Slavia Prague | 2004 | | 27 | 3 |
| 14 | Andrei Konovalov | (Russia) | MF | 13 September 1974 (aged 30) | Krylia Sovetov | 2002 | | | |
| 15 | Vitālijs Astafjevs | (Latvia) | MF | 3 April 1971 (aged 33) | Admira Wacker | 2004 | | 9 | 2 |
| 19 | Andrés Scotti | (Uruguay) | MF | 14 December 1975 (aged 28) | Nacional | 2003 | | 28 | 4 |
| 33 | Radosav Bulić | (Serbia and Montenegro) | MF | 2 January 1977 (aged 27) | Smederevo 1924 | 2004 | | 1 | 0 |
| 77 | Ansar Ayupov | (Russia) | MF | 23 March 1972 (aged 32) | Chernomorets Novorossiysk | 2004 | | 15 | 0 |
Forwards
| 8 | Aloísio | (Brazil) | FW | 27 January 1975 (aged 29) | Paris Saint-Germain | 2003 | | 6 | 0 |
| 18 | Alejandro Domínguez | (Argentina) | FW | 10 June 1981 (aged 23) | River Plate | 2004 | | 22 | 2 |
| 23 | Ebrima Ebou Sillah | (The Gambia) | FW | 12 April 1980 (aged 24) | Club Brugge | 2003 | | 12 | 2 |
| 31 | Moustapha Mouhamadou Mané | (Senegal) | FW | 19 January 1984 (aged 20) | AS Police | 2003 | | 0 | 0 |
| 32 | Wladimir Baýramow | (Turkmenistan) | FW | 2 August 1980 (aged 24) | Metallurg Krasnoyarsk | 2003 | | 1 | 0 |
Away on loan
| 17 | Rôni | (Brazil) | FW | 28 April 1977 (aged 27) | Fluminense | 2003 | | 29 | 11 |
| | Dmitri Chigazov | (Russia) | GK | 29 June 1983 (aged 21) | | 2003 | | 0 | 0 |
Players that left Rubin Kazan during the season
| 10 | Abdelkarim Kissi | (Morocco) | MF | 5 May 1980 (aged 24) | MAS Fez | 2002 | | | |
| 15 | Carlos Castro | (Costa Rica) | MF | 10 September 1978 (aged 26) | Alajuelense | 2003 | | 6 | 0 |
| 20 | Oleg Nechayev | (Russia) | FW | 25 June 1971 (aged 33) | Lada-Grad Dimitrovgrad | 2002 | | | |
| 30 | Cédric Roussel | (Belgium) | FW | 6 January 1978 (aged 26) | KRC Genk | 2004 | | 7 | 1 |
| 43 | Dmitri Michkov | (Russia) | MF | 22 January 1980 (aged 24) | Servette | 2003 | | 7 | 2 |
| 55 | Mindaugas Kalonas | (Lithuania) | MF | 28 February 1984 (aged 20) | Dynamo Moscow | 2003 | | 0 | 0 |
| 84 | Ivan Zavaliy | (Russia) | FW | 18 September 1984 (aged 20) | SKA Rostov-on-Don | 2004 | | 1 | 0 |

=== On loan ===
Note: Flags indicate national team as defined under FIFA eligibility rules; some limited exceptions apply. Players may hold more than one non-FIFA nationality.

| No. / Pos. / Nation / Player; 17 / FW / BRA / Rôni (at Krylia Sovetov) | No. / Pos. / Nation / Player; — / GK / RUS / Dmitri Chigazov (at Rubin-2 Kazan) |

=== Left club during season ===
Note: Flags indicate national team as defined under FIFA eligibility rules; some limited exceptions apply. Players may hold more than one non-FIFA nationality.

| No. | Pos. | Nation | Player |
|---|---|---|---|
| 15 | MF | CRC | Carlos Castro (to Alajuelense) |
| 20 | FW | RUS | Oleg Nechayev (to Lada-Tolyatti) |

| No. | Pos. | Nation | Player |
|---|---|---|---|
| 43 | MF | RUS | Dmitri Michkov (to SKA-Energia Khabarovsk) |
| 84 | FW | RUS | Ivan Zavaliy (to SKA-Energia Khabarovsk) |

== Transfers ==
=== In ===
| Date | Position | Nationality | Name | From | Fee | Ref. |
|---|---|---|---|---|---|---|
| Winter 2004 | GK | (Russia) | Valeri Chizhov | Saturn Ramenskoye | Undisclosed | |
| Winter 2004 | DF | (Russia) | Marat Makhmutov | Torpedo Moscow | Undisclosed | |
| Winter 2004 | DF | (Czech Republic) | Adam Petrouš | Slavia Prague | Undisclosed | |
| Winter 2004 | MF | (Czech Republic) | Richard Dostálek | Slavia Prague | Undisclosed | |
| Winter 2004 | MF | (Russia) | Ansar Ayupov | Chernomorets Novorossiysk | Undisclosed | |
| Winter 2004 | FW | (Argentina) | Alejandro Domínguez | River Plate | Undisclosed | |
| Winter 2004 | FW | (Russia) | Ivan Zavaliy | SKA Rostov-on-Don | Undisclosed | |
| Summer 2004 | GK | (Turkmenistan) | Pavel Kharchik | Neftekhimik Nizhnekamsk | Undisclosed | |
| Summer 2004 | MF | (Latvia) | Vitālijs Astafjevs | Admira Wacker | Undisclosed | |
| Summer 2004 | MF | (Serbia and Montenegro) | Radosav Bulić | Smederevo 1924 | Undisclosed | |
| Summer 2004 | FW | (Belgium) | Cédric Roussel | KRC Genk | Undisclosed | |

=== Out ===
| Date | Position | Nationality | Name | To | Fee | Ref. |
|---|---|---|---|---|---|---|
| Winter 2004 | GK | (Turkmenistan) | Pavel Kharchik | Neftekhimik Nizhnekamsk | Undisclosed | |
| Winter 2004 | DF | (Georgia (country)) | Levan Silagadze | Dinamo Tbilisi | Undisclosed | |
| Winter 2004 | MF | (Russia) | Marat Akhmetzyanov | Rubin-2 Kazan | Undisclosed | |
| Winter 2004 | MF | (Russia) | Marat Khairullin | Rubin-2 Kazan | Undisclosed | |
| Winter 2004 | MF | (Russia) | Aleksandr Kukanos | Rubin-2 Kazan | Undisclosed | |
| Winter 2004 | FW | (Georgia (country)) | David Chaladze | Anorthosis Famagusta | Undisclosed | |
| Summer 2004 | MF | (Costa Rica) | Carlos Castro | Alajuelense | Undisclosed | |
| Summer 2004 | MF | (Costa Rica) | Carlos Castro | Alajuelense | Undisclosed | |
| Summer 2004 | MF | (Lithuania) | Mindaugas Kalonas | S.C. Braga | Undisclosed | |
| Summer 2004 | MF | (Morocco) | Abdelkarim Kissi | Litex Lovech | Undisclosed | |
| Summer 2004 | MF | (Russia) | Dmitri Michkov | SKA-Energia Khabarovsk | Undisclosed | |
| Summer 2004 | FW | (Belgium) | Cédric Roussel | Standard Liège | Undisclosed | |
| Summer 2004 | FW | (Russia) | Oleg Nechayev | Lada-Tolyatti | Undisclosed | |
| Summer 2004 | FW | (Russia) | Ivan Zavaliy | SKA-Energia Khabarovsk | Undisclosed | |

=== Loans out ===
| Date from | Position | Nationality | Name | To | Date to | Ref. |
|---|---|---|---|---|---|---|
| Winter 2004 | GK | (Russia) | Dmitri Chigazov | Rubin-2 Kazan | End of the Season | |
| Winter 2004 | DF | (Russia) | Andrei Kolesnikov | Neftekhimik Nizhnekamsk | Summer 2004 | |
| Winter 2004 | DF | (Russia) | Andrei Streltsov | Neftekhimik Nizhnekamsk | Summer 2004 | |
| Summer 2004 | FW | (Brazil) | Rôni | Krylia Sovetov | Winter 2005 | |

=== Released ===
| Date | Position | Nationality | Name | Joined | Date |
|---|---|---|---|---|---|
| Winter 2005 | GK | (Russia) | Sergei Kozko | FC Moscow | |
| Winter 2005 | GK | (Russia) | Valeri Aleskarov | Rubin-2 Kazan | |
| Winter 2005 | GK | (Russia) | Valeri Chizhov | Saturn Ramenskoye | |
| Winter 2005 | DF | (Russia) | Sergei Kharlamov | Retired | |
| Winter 2005 | DF | (Russia) | Andrei Streltsov | Dinaburg | |
| Winter 2005 | DF | (Czech Republic) | Jiří Novotný | Baník Most | |
| Winter 2005 | DF | (Russia) | Roman Sharonov | Terek Grozny | |
| Winter 2005 | MF | (Czech Republic) | Richard Dostálek | 1. FC Slovácko | |
| Winter 2005 | MF | (Russia) | Denis Boyarintsev | Spartak Moscow | |
| Winter 2005 | MF | (Russia) | Andrei Kolesnikov | Ural Sverdlovsk Oblast | |

== Competitions ==
=== Premier League ===
==== Results by round ====
| Round | 1 | 2 | 3 | 4 | 5 | 6 | 7 | 8 | 9 | 10 | 11 | 12 | 13 | 14 | 15 | 16 | 17 | 18 | 19 | 20 | 21 | 22 | 23 | 24 | 25 | 26 | 27 | 28 | 29 | 30 |
|---|---|---|---|---|---|---|---|---|---|---|---|---|---|---|---|---|---|---|---|---|---|---|---|---|---|---|---|---|---|---|
| Ground | A | A | H | H | A | H | A | H | A | A | H | A | H | A | H | A | H | H | A | H | A | H | A | H | A | H | A | H | A | H |
| Result | D | L | D | D | L | L | D | W | L | D | D | D | W | W | W | L | D | L | L | W | D | L | L | D | L | D | D | W | L | W |

Updated to match(es) played on 11 November 2004. Source: See Results
A = Away; H = Home; W = Win; D = Draw; L = Loss

==== Results ====
| 13 March 2004 1 | Alania Vladikavkaz | 0 – 0 | Rubin Kazan | Vladikavkaz |
| 15:00 MSK (UTC+3) | Tarlowski (yellow card) 55' | Report | Fyodorov (yellow card) 60' | Stadium: Republican Spartak Stadium; Attendance: 20,000; Referee: Alexey Tyumin |

| 21 March 2004 2 | Kuban Krasnodar | 1 – 0 | Rubin Kazan | Krasnodar |
| 17:00 MSK (UTC+3) | Orekhov 12'; Solomatin (yellow card) 40'; Topchu (yellow card) 64'; Gerasimenko (yellow card) 64'; Kantonistov (yellow card) 65'; Goncharov (yellow card) 90+' | Report | Sharonov (yellow card) 20' | Stadium: Kuban Stadium; Attendance: 16,000; Referee: Mikhail Khodyrev |

| 27 March 2004 3 | Rubin Kazan | 1 – 1 | Rostov | Kazan |
| 18:00 MSK (UTC+3) | Konovalov 21'; Aloísio (yellow card) 34' | Report | Adamov (yellow card) 25'; Villaseca (yellow card) 34'; Hendricks 48'; Rogochiy (yellow card) 62' | Stadium: Central Stadium; Attendance: 10,000; Referee: Mikhail Veselovsky |

| 3 April 2004 4 | Rubin Kazan | 0 – 0 | Lokomotiv Moscow | Kazan |
| 16:00 MSK (UTC+3) | Sharonov (yellow card) 70' | Report | Evseev (yellow card) 5'; Lekgetho (yellow card) 55' | Stadium: Central Stadium; Attendance: 10,000; Referee: Alexander Gonchar |

| 7 April 2004 5 | Zenit St.Petersburg | 4 – 3 | Rubin Kazan | Saint Petersburg |
| 19:00 MSK (UTC+3) | Spivak 21' (pen.); Šírl 38'; Radimov 42'; Vještica (red card) 73'; Kerzhakov 85'; Horshkov (yellow card) 88' | Report | Rôni 22'; Fyodorov 48'; Boyarintsev 68'; Sillah (red card) 73'; Petrouš (yellow card) 78'; Novotný (yellow card) 90' | Stadium: Petrovsky Stadium; Attendance: 21,500; Referee: Yuri Baskakov |

| 10 April 2004 6 | Rubin Kazan | 1 – 3 | Krylia Sovetov | Kazan |
| 16:00 MSK (UTC+3) | Konovalov 3' | Report | Vinogradov 15', 45'; Koroman (yellow card) 27'; Karyaka 29' (pen.); Catanha (yellow card) 88' | Stadium: Central Stadium; Attendance: 7,000; Referee: Igor Zakharov |

| 17 April 2004 7 | Dynamo Moscow | 0 – 0 | Rubin Kazan | Moscow |
| 18:00 MSK (UTC+3) | | Report | Kharlamov (yellow card) 10'; Konovalov (yellow card) 88' | Stadium: Central Dynamo Stadium; Attendance: 4,500; Referee: Sergey Fursa |

| 24 April 2004 8 | Rubin Kazan | 2 – 0 | Spartak Moscow | Kazan |
| 14:00 MSK (UTC+3) | Aloísio 15'; Dostálek (yellow card) 18'; Sharonov (yellow card) 20'; Konovalov 51' (yellow card) 80' | Report | Mitreski (yellow card) 12'; Sosa (yellow card) 82' | Stadium: Central Stadium; Attendance: 16,000; Referee: Nikolai Ivanov |

| 2 May 2004 9 | Torpedo Moscow | 1 – 0 | Rubin Kazan | Moscow |
| 17:00 MSK (UTC+3) | Semshov (yellow card) 45'; Panov 63' | Report | Sillah (yellow card) 21'; Aloísio (yellow card) 30'; Sharonov (yellow card) 38' | Stadium: Luzhniki Stadium; Attendance: 4,000; Referee: Sergey Lapochkin |

| 8 May 2004 10 | Shinnik Yaroslavl | 1 – 1 | Rubin Kazan | Yaroslavl |
| 17:00 MSK (UTC+3) | Shevchuk 29'; Vasilyev (yellow card) 43'; Khazov (yellow card) 90' | Report | Calisto 22' (yellow card) 89' | Stadium: Shinnik Stadium; Attendance: 11,000; Referee: Yuri Baskakov |

| 15 May 2004 11 | Rubin Kazan | 2 – 2 | Amkar Perm | Kazan |
| 16:00 MSK (UTC+3) | Aloísio (yellow card) 7'; Rôni 11'; Dostálek 61' | Report | Shutov 12', 64'; Kobenko (red card) 15'; Leonchenko (yellow card) 41'; Lavrik (yellow card) 72' | Stadium: Central Stadium; Attendance: 10,000; Referee: Valery Shaveyko |

| 19 May 2004 12 | Saturn Ramenskoye | 1 – 1 | Rubin Kazan | Ramenskoye |
| 9,000 MSK (UTC+3) | Bastía (yellow card) 45'; Guiñazú (yellow card) 68'; Delgado (yellow card) 75'; Narde 82'; Pavlovich (yellow card) 90' | Report | Dostálek 21'; Calisto (yellow card) 34'; Sharonov (yellow card) 34'; Konovalov (yellow card) 41'; Kozko (yellow card) 69'; Domínguez (yellow card) 84' (yellow-red card) 85' | Stadium: Saturn Stadium; Attendance: 9,000; Referee: Vladimir Vlasov |

| 23 May 2004 13 | Rubin Kazan | 3 – 0 | FC Moscow | Kazan |
| 18:00 MSK (UTC+3) | Dostálek 52'; Baýramow 81', 83' | Report | Biletskyi (yellow card) 40'; Orlov (yellow card) 71' | Stadium: Central Stadium; Attendance: 10,000; Referee: Stanislav Sukhina |

| 3 July 2004 14 | Rotor Volgograd | 0 – 1 | Rubin Kazan | Volgograd |
| 18:00 MSK (UTC+3) | Yesipov (yellow card) 44' | Report | Baýramow 58' | Stadium: Central Stadium; Attendance: 7,000; Referee: Aleksandr Kolobaev |

| 7 July 2004 15 | Rubin Kazan | 2 – 1 | CSKA Moscow | Kazan |
| 18:00 MSK (UTC+3) | Rôni (yellow card) 55' (goal) 58', 84' (pen.); Sinyov (yellow card) 65'; Kozko (yellow card) 73' | Report | Semak (yellow card) 43'; Jarošík 52'; Rahimić (yellow card) 78'; Mandrykin (red card) 83' | Stadium: Central Stadium; Attendance: 14,000; Referee: Sergey Timofeev |

| 11 July 2004 16 | FC Moscow | 1 – 0 | Rubin Kazan | Moscow |
| 19:00 MSK (UTC+3) | Yaskovich (yellow card) 38' (yellow-red card) 90+'; Melyoshin (yellow card) 45'; Budunov 73' | Report | Domínguez (yellow card) 24'; Dostálek (yellow card) 41'; Sharonov (yellow card) 76' | Stadium: Eduard Streltsov Stadium; Attendance: 1,500; Referee: Yuri Klyuchnikov |

| 18 July 2004 17 | Rubin Kazan | 1 – 1 | Rotor Volgograd | Kazan |
| 18:00 MSK (UTC+3) | Scotti (yellow card) 24'; Konovalov (yellow card) 30'; Novotný 47'; Sibaya (yellow card) 67' | Report | Yesipov 26' (yellow card) 86'; Radkevich (yellow card) 51'; Krivov (yellow card) 60'; Mogilevskiy (yellow card) 89' | Stadium: Central Stadium; Attendance: 8,000; Referee: Sergey Frantsuzov |

| 23 July 2004 18 | CSKA Moscow | 1 – 0 | Rubin Kazan | Moscow |
| 19:00 MSK (UTC+3) | Olić 43' (yellow card) 87'; Šemberas (yellow card) 80' | Report | Sibaya (yellow card) 72' (yellow-red card) 77'; Calisto (yellow card) 89' | Stadium: Dynamo Stadium; Attendance: 7,000; Referee: Stanislav Sukhina |

| 15 August 2004 19 | Rubin Kazan | 0 – 1 | Saturn Ramenskoye | Kazan |
| MSK (UTC+3) | Čížek (yellow card) 42' | Report | Delgado (yellow card) 36' (goal) 75'; Díaz (yellow card) 40'; Narde (yellow card) 52'; Lešnjak (yellow card) 68' | Stadium: Central Stadium; Attendance: 9,000; Referee: Mikhail Khodyrev |

| 22 August 2004 20 | Rubin Kazan | 2 – 0 | Torpedo Moscow | Kazan |
| MSK (UTC+3) | Boyarintsev 4' (yellow card) 68'; Rôni 54'; Dostálek (yellow card) 90+' | Report | Kormiltsev (yellow card) 30'; Chernogayev (yellow card) 63' | Stadium: Central Stadium; Attendance: 8,000; Referee: Yuri Klyuchnikov |

| 29 August 2004 21 | Amkar Perm | 2 – 2 | Rubin Kazan | Perm |
| MSK (UTC+3) | Popov (yellow card) 31'; Paramonov 66', 90' | Report | Sibaya (yellow card) 26'; Sinyov (yellow card) 38'; Sillah 82'; Fyodorov 85' | Stadium: Zvezda Stadium; Attendance: 12,500; Referee: Valery Shaveyko |

| 12 September 2004 22 | Rubin Kazan | 0 – 1 | Shinnik Yaroslavl | Kazan |
| 18:00 MSK (UTC+3) | | Report | Radosavljević (yellow card) 42' (yellow-red card) 84'; Shtanyuk (yellow card) 43'; Łągiewka 80'; Kulchy (yellow card) 90' | Stadium: Central Stadium; Attendance: 5,000; Referee: Alexander Evstigneev |

| 20 September 2004 23 | Spartak Moscow | 2 – 0 | Rubin Kazan | Moscow |
| MSK (UTC+3) | Pavlyuchenko 27' (pen.) (yellow card) 38'; Pjanović 89' | Report | Baýramow (yellow card) 84' | Stadium: Luzhniki Stadium; Attendance: 4,500; Referee: Yuri Kunitsa |

| 25 September 2019 24 | Rubin Kazan | 2 – 2 | Dynamo Moscow | Kazan |
| 16:00 MSK (UTC+3) | Astafjevs 7'; Roussel 31'; Scotti (yellow card) 65' | Report | Tochilin (yellow card) 34'; Gyan 53', 90+'; Romaschenko (yellow card) 62' | Stadium: Central Stadium; Attendance: 5,000; Referee: Aleksandr Gvardis |

| 2 October 2004 25 | Krylia Sovetov | 2 – 1 | Rubin Kazan | Samara |
| 16:00 MSK (UTC+3) | Souza (yellow card) 17'; Tikhonov 23' (pen.); Anyukov (yellow card) 69'; Karyaka 86' | Report | Domínguez (yellow card) 19' (goal) 65'; Scotti (yellow card) 58'; Sibaya (yellow card) 75'; Calisto (penalty missed) 84' | Stadium: Metallurg Stadium; Attendance: 17,500; Referee: Sergey Fursa |

| 16 October 2004 26 | Rubin Kazan | 1 – 1 | Zenit St.Petersburg | Kazan |
| 16:00 MSK (UTC+3) | Konovalov (yellow card) 12'; Sibaya (yellow card) 26'; Domínguez 34' (pen.); Aloísio (yellow card) 78' | Report | Denisov 37'; Horák (yellow card) 85'; Horshkov (yellow card) 87'; Vlasov (yellow card) 90+' | Stadium: Central Stadium; Attendance: 8,300; Referee: Alexander Kolobaev |

| 24 October 2004 27 | Lokomotiv Moscow | 0 – 0 | Rubin Kazan | Moscow |
| 18:00 MSK (UTC+3) | Nizhegorodov (yellow card) 29'; Lima (yellow card) 35' | Report | Dostálek (yellow card) 32'; Baýramow (yellow card) 90+' | Stadium: RZD Arena; Attendance: 8,200; Referee: Igor Egorov |

| 30 October 2004 28 | Rubin Kazan | 2 – 0 | Kuban Krasnodar | Kazan |
| 19:00 MSK (UTC+3) | Boyarintsev 58', 63' (yellow card) 85'; Fyodorov (yellow card) 82' | Report | Aksyonov (yellow card) 14'; Ushenin (yellow card) 78' | Stadium: Central Stadium; Attendance: 5,200; Referee: Aleksei Nikolaev |

| 7 November 2004 29 | Rostov | 1 – 0 | Rubin Kazan | Rostov-on-Don |
| MSK (UTC+3) | Kanyenda 16'; Rogochiy (yellow card) 20'; Dantsev (yellow card) 47' | Report | Kozko (yellow card) 17'; Čížek (yellow card) 24'; Konovalov (yellow card) 68' | Stadium: Olimp-2; Attendance: 7,500; Referee: Nikolai Ivanov |

| 11 November 2004 30 | Rubin Kazan | 4 – 1 | Alania Vladikavkaz | Kazan |
| MSK (UTC+3) | Calisto 2'; Astafjevs 17'; Čížek 45', 81' | Report | Ailarov 27'; Drozdov (yellow card) 30'; Barasa (yellow card) 42' | Stadium: Central Stadium; Attendance: 3,500; Referee: Aleksei Nikolaev |

==== League table ====
| Pos | Team | Pld | W | D | L | GF | GA | GD | Pts | Qualification or relegation |
|---|---|---|---|---|---|---|---|---|---|---|
| 1 | Lokomotiv Moscow (C) | 30 | 18 | 7 | 5 | 44 | 19 | +25 | 61 | 2005–06 UEFA Champions League Second qualifying round |
| 2 | CSKA Moscow | 30 | 17 | 9 | 4 | 53 | 22 | +31 | 60 | 2005–06 UEFA Cup First round |
| 3 | Krylia Sovetov Samara | 30 | 17 | 5 | 8 | 50 | 41 | +9 | 56 | 2005–06 UEFA Cup Second qualifying round |
| 4 | Zenit St. Petersburg | 30 | 17 | 5 | 8 | 55 | 37 | +18 | 56 | 2005–06 UEFA Cup Second qualifying round |
| 5 | Torpedo Moscow | 30 | 16 | 6 | 8 | 53 | 37 | +16 | 54 | |
| 6 | Shinnik Yaroslavl | 30 | 12 | 8 | 10 | 29 | 29 | 0 | 44 | |
| 7 | Saturn | 30 | 10 | 11 | 9 | 37 | 30 | +7 | 41 | |
| 8 | Spartak Moscow | 30 | 11 | 7 | 12 | 43 | 44 | −1 | 40 | |
| 9 | FC Moscow | 30 | 10 | 10 | 10 | 38 | 39 | −1 | 40 | |
| 10 | Rubin Kazan | 30 | 7 | 12 | 11 | 32 | 31 | +1 | 33 | |
| 11 | Amkar Perm | 30 | 6 | 12 | 12 | 27 | 42 | −15 | 30 | |
| 12 | Rostov | 30 | 7 | 8 | 15 | 28 | 42 | −14 | 29 | |
| 13 | Dynamo Moscow | 30 | 6 | 11 | 13 | 27 | 38 | −11 | 29 | |
| 14 | Alania Vladikavkaz | 30 | 7 | 7 | 16 | 28 | 52 | −24 | 28 | |
| 15 | Kuban Krasnodar (R) | 30 | 6 | 10 | 14 | 26 | 42 | −16 | 28 | Relegation to 2005 Russian First Division |
| 16 | Rotor Volgograd (R) | 30 | 4 | 10 | 16 | 28 | 53 | −25 | 22 | Relegation to 2005 Russian First Division |

Source: RSSSF
Rules for classification: 1st points; 2nd matches won; 3rd head-to-head (points, matches won, goal difference, goals scored, away goals scored); 4th goal difference
(C) Champions; (R) Relegated

=== Russian Cup ===
==== 2003-04 ====
| 4 March 2004 Last 16 1st leg | Rubin Kazan | 1 – 1 | Lokomotiv Moscow | Kazan |
| 16:00 MSK (UTC+3) | Aloísio 45+' | Report | Asatiani (yellow card) 32'; Pashinin 42'; Lekgetho (yellow card) 61' | Stadium: Central Stadium; Attendance: 15,000; Referee: Sergey Lapochkin |

| 24 March 2004 Last 32 1st leg | Lokomotiv Moscow | 1 – 0 (2 – 1 agg.) | Rubin Kazan | Moscow |
| 19:00 MSK (UTC+3) | Izmailov 20' | Report | Sibaya (yellow card) 35'; Sinyov (yellow card) 75'; Kissi (yellow card) 79' | Stadium: RZD Arena; Attendance: 6,400; Referee: Aleksandr Gvardis |

==== 2004-05 ====
| 31 July 2004 Last 32 1st leg | Rubin Kazan | 0 – 1 | Khimki | Kazan |
| 16:00 MSK (UTC+3) | Rôni (penalty missed) 51' | Report | Gavrilin 57'; Jovanović (yellow card) 65' | Stadium: Central Stadium; Attendance: 4,000; Referee: Yuri Baskakov |

| 10 October 2004 Last 32 2nd leg | Khimki | 3 – 1 (4 – 1 agg.) | Rubin Kazan | Moscow |
| 15:00 MSK (UTC+3) | Grishin 5', 87'; Abramidze (yellow card) 31'; Petrouš 43' (o.g.); Danishevsky (yellow card) 49'; Starkov (yellow card) 85' | Report | Petrouš (penalty missed) 6'; Scotti (yellow card) 51'; Čížek 59'; Konovalov (yellow card) 87' | Stadium: Energomash Stadium; Attendance: 1,000; Referee: Igor Egorov |

=== UEFA Cup ===
| 12 August 2004 Second qualifying round 1st leg | Rapid Wien (Austria) | 0 – 2 | (Russia) Rubin Kazan | Vienna, Austria |
| MSK (UTC+3) | Mart.Hiden (yellow card) 67' (red card) 67'; Ivanschitz (yellow card) 69' | Report | Rôni 50'; Boyarintsev 64'; Calisto (yellow card) 72'; Sillah (yellow card) 74'; Sinyov (yellow card) 82' | Stadium: Gerhard Hanappi Stadium |

| 19 August 2004 Second qualifying round 2nd leg | Rubin Kazan (Russia) | 0 – 3 (2 – 3 agg.) | (Austria) Rapid Wien | Kazan, Russia |
| MSK (UTC+3) | Sinyov (yellow card) 23'; Sillah (yellow card) 27'; Scotti (yellow card) 85'; Domínguez (yellow card) 85'; Calisto (red card) 86' | Report | Katzer (yellow card) 10'; S.Hofmann 17', 70'; Feldhofer (yellow card) 28'; Kincl 29' | Stadium: Central Stadium |

== Squad statistics ==
As of match played 11 November 2004

=== Appearances and goals ===
| No. | Pos | Nat | Player | Total | | Premier League | | 2003–04 Russian Cup | | 2004–05 Russian Cup | | UEFA Cup | |
| No. | Pos | Nat | Player | Apps | Goals | Apps | Goals | Apps | Goals | Apps | Goals | Apps | Goals |
|---|---|---|---|---|---|---|---|---|---|---|---|---|---|
| 1 | GK | (Russia) RUS | Sergei Kozko | 22 | 0 | 20 | 0 | 0 | 0 | 0 | 0 | 2 | 0 |
| 2 | DF | (Brazil) BRA | Calisto | 33 | 2 | 29 | 2 | 0 | 0 | 2 | 0 | 2 | 0 |
| 3 | DF | (Russia) RUS | Sergei Kharlamov | 1 | 0 | 1 | 0 | 0 | 0 | 0 | 0 | 0 | 0 |
| 4 | DF | (Russia) RUS | Marat Makhmutov | 8 | 1 | 5+2 | 1 | 1 | 0 | 0 | 0 | 0 | 0 |
| 5 | DF | (Uzbekistan) UZB | Andrei Fyodorov | 10 | 1 | 9+1 | 1 | 0 | 0 | 0 | 0 | 0 | 0 |
| 6 | MF | (South Africa) RSA | MacBeth Sibaya | 29 | 0 | 22+4 | 0 | 1 | 0 | 0 | 0 | 2 | 0 |
| 7 | MF | (Russia) RUS | Denis Boyarintsev | 29 | 4 | 23+1 | 3 | 2 | 0 | 0+1 | 0 | 2 | 1 |
| 8 | FW | (Brazil) BRA | Aloísio | 13 | 2 | 9+1 | 1 | 2 | 1 | 1 | 0 | 0 | 0 |
| 11 | MF | (Czech Republic) CZE | Tomáš Čížek | 16 | 2 | 10+3 | 2 | 1 | 0 | 1 | 0 | 0+1 | 0 |
| 12 | MF | (Czech Republic) CZE | Richard Dostálek | 27 | 3 | 20+4 | 3 | 1 | 0 | 1 | 0 | 0+1 | 0 |
| 14 | MF | (Russia) RUS | Andrei Konovalov | 27 | 3 | 17+5 | 3 | 1 | 0 | 1+1 | 0 | 2 | 0 |
| 15 | MF | (Latvia) LVA | Vitālijs Astafjevs | 9 | 2 | 7+1 | 2 | 0 | 0 | 0 | 0 | 0+1 | 0 |
| 18 | FW | (Argentina) ARG | Alejandro Domínguez | 22 | 2 | 14+4 | 2 | 0+2 | 0 | 1 | 0 | 1 | 0 |
| 19 | MF | (Uruguay) URU | Andrés Scotti | 28 | 0 | 21+2 | 0 | 1 | 0 | 2 | 0 | 2 | 0 |
| 21 | DF | (Russia) RUS | Mikhail Sinyov | 30 | 0 | 25 | 0 | 1 | 0 | 2 | 0 | 2 | 0 |
| 22 | GK | (Russia) RUS | Valeri Chizhov | 14 | 0 | 10 | 0 | 2 | 0 | 2 | 0 | 0 | 0 |
| 23 | FW | (The Gambia) GAM | Ebrima Ebou Sillah | 23 | 1 | 3+16 | 1 | 0+1 | 0 | 1 | 0 | 2 | 0 |
| 24 | DF | (Czech Republic) CZE | Jiří Novotný | 19 | 0 | 17 | 0 | 1+1 | 0 | 0 | 0 | 0 | 0 |
| 27 | DF | (Russia) RUS | Roman Sharonov | 28 | 0 | 17+6 | 0 | 1 | 0 | 2 | 0 | 2 | 0 |
| 28 | DF | (Czech Republic) CZE | Adam Petrouš | 26 | 0 | 19+1 | 0 | 2 | 0 | 2 | 0 | 2 | 0 |
| 32 | FW | (Turkmenistan) TKM | Wladimir Baýramow | 16 | 3 | 4+9 | 3 | 1 | 0 | 1 | 0 | 0+1 | 0 |
| 33 | MF | (Serbia and Montenegro) SCG | Radosav Bulić | 1 | 0 | 0+1 | 0 | 0 | 0 | 0 | 0 | 0 | 0 |
| 77 | MF | (Russia) RUS | Ansar Ayupov | 15 | 0 | 9+3 | 0 | 2 | 0 | 1 | 0 | 0 | 0 |
Players away from the club on loan:
| 17 | FW | (Brazil) BRA | Rôni | 20 | 6 | 15+2 | 5 | 1 | 0 | 1 | 0 | 1 | 1 |
Players who appeared for Rubin Kazan but left during the season:
| 10 | MF | (Morocco) MAR | Abdelkarim Kissi | 3 | 0 | 0+1 | 0 | 1 | 0 | 1 | 0 | 0 | 0 |
| 20 | MF | (Russia) RUS | Oleg Nechayev | 1 | 0 | 0+1 | 0 | 0 | 0 | 0 | 0 | 0 | 0 |
| 30 | FW | (Belgium) BEL | Cédric Roussel | 7 | 1 | 4+2 | 1 | 0 | 0 | 0 | 0 | 0+1 | 0 |
| 84 | FW | (Russia) RUS | Ivan Zavaliy | 1 | 0 | 0+1 | 0 | 0 | 0 | 0 | 0 | 0 | 0 |

=== Goal scorers ===
| Place | Position | Nation | Number | Name | Premier League | 2003–04 Russian Cup | 2004–05 Russian Cup | UEFA Cup | Total |
|---|---|---|---|---|---|---|---|---|---|
| 1 | FW | (Brazil) | 17 | Rôni | 5 | 0 | 0 | 1 | 6 |
| 2 | MF | (Russia) | 7 | Denis Boyarintsev | 3 | 0 | 0 | 1 | 4 |
| 3 | FW | (Turkmenistan) | 32 | Wladimir Baýramow | 3 | 0 | 0 | 0 | 3 |
| 3 | MF | (Czech Republic) | 12 | Richard Dostálek | 3 | 0 | 0 | 0 | 3 |
| 3 | MF | (Russia) | 14 | Andrei Konovalov | 3 | 0 | 0 | 0 | 3 |
| 3 | MF | (Czech Republic) | 11 | Tomáš Čížek | 2 | 0 | 1 | 0 | 3 |
| 7 | DF | (Brazil) | 2 | Calisto | 2 | 0 | 0 | 0 | 2 |
| 7 | MF | (Latvia) | 15 | Vitālijs Astafjevs | 2 | 0 | 0 | 0 | 2 |
| 7 | FW | (Argentina) | 18 | Alejandro Domínguez | 2 | 0 | 0 | 0 | 2 |
| 7 | FW | (Brazil) | 8 | Aloísio | 1 | 1 | 0 | 0 | 2 |
| 7 | | | | Own goal | 2 | 0 | 0 | 0 | 2 |
| 12 | DF | (Uzbekistan) | 5 | Andrei Fyodorov | 1 | 0 | 0 | 0 | 1 |
| 12 | DF | (Russia) | 4 | Marat Makhmutov | 1 | 0 | 0 | 0 | 1 |
| 12 | FW | (The Gambia) | 23 | Ebrima Ebou Sillah | 1 | 0 | 0 | 0 | 1 |
| 12 | FW | (Belgium) | 30 | Cédric Roussel | 1 | 0 | 0 | 0 | 1 |
| Total | | | | | 32 | 1 | 1 | 2 | 36 |

=== Disciplinary record ===
| Number | Nation | Position | Name | Premier League | | 2003–04 Russian Cup | | 2004–05 Russian Cup | | UEFA Cup | | Total | |
| Number | Nation | Position | Name | Booked | Sent off (straight red) | Booked | Sent off (straight red) | Booked | Sent off (straight red) | Booked | Sent off (straight red) | Booked | Sent off (straight red) |
|---|---|---|---|---|---|---|---|---|---|---|---|---|---|
| 1 | (Russia) | GK | Sergei Kozko | 3 | 0 | 0 | 0 | 0 | 0 | 0 | 0 | 3 | 0 |
| 2 | (Brazil) | DF | Calisto | 3 | 0 | 0 | 0 | 0 | 0 | 1 | 1 | 4 | 1 |
| 3 | (Russia) | DF | Sergei Kharlamov | 1 | 0 | 0 | 0 | 0 | 0 | 0 | 0 | 1 | 0 |
| 5 | (Uzbekistan) | DF | Andrei Fyodorov | 2 | 0 | 0 | 0 | 0 | 0 | 0 | 0 | 2 | 0 |
| 6 | (South Africa) | MF | MacBeth Sibaya | 6 | 1 | 1 | 0 | 0 | 0 | 0 | 0 | 7 | 1 |
| 7 | (Russia) | MF | Denis Boyarintsev | 2 | 0 | 0 | 0 | 0 | 0 | 0 | 0 | 2 | 0 |
| 8 | (Brazil) | FW | Aloísio | 4 | 0 | 0 | 0 | 0 | 0 | 0 | 0 | 4 | 0 |
| 11 | (Czech Republic) | MF | Tomáš Čížek | 2 | 0 | 0 | 0 | 0 | 0 | 0 | 0 | 2 | 0 |
| 12 | (Czech Republic) | MF | Richard Dostálek | 4 | 0 | 0 | 0 | 0 | 0 | 0 | 0 | 4 | 0 |
| 14 | (Russia) | MF | Andrei Konovalov | 6 | 0 | 0 | 0 | 1 | 0 | 0 | 0 | 7 | 0 |
| 18 | (Argentina) | FW | Alejandro Domínguez | 4 | 1 | 0 | 0 | 0 | 0 | 1 | 0 | 5 | 1 |
| 19 | (Uruguay) | MF | Andrés Scotti | 3 | 0 | 0 | 0 | 1 | 0 | 1 | 0 | 5 | 0 |
| 21 | (Russia) | DF | Mikhail Sinyov | 2 | 0 | 1 | 0 | 0 | 0 | 2 | 0 | 5 | 0 |
| 23 | (The Gambia) | FW | Ebrima Ebou Sillah | 1 | 1 | 0 | 0 | 0 | 0 | 2 | 0 | 3 | 1 |
| 24 | (Czech Republic) | DF | Jiří Novotný | 1 | 0 | 0 | 0 | 0 | 0 | 0 | 0 | 1 | 0 |
| 27 | (Russia) | DF | Roman Sharonov | 6 | 0 | 0 | 0 | 0 | 0 | 0 | 0 | 6 | 0 |
| 28 | (Czech Republic) | DF | Adam Petrouš | 1 | 0 | 0 | 0 | 0 | 0 | 0 | 0 | 1 | 0 |
| 32 | (Turkmenistan) | FW | Wladimir Baýramow | 2 | 0 | 0 | 0 | 0 | 0 | 0 | 0 | 2 | 0 |
Players away on loan:
| 17 | (Brazil) | FW | Rôni | 1 | 0 | 0 | 0 | 0 | 0 | 0 | 0 | 1 | 0 |
Players who left Rubin Kazan during the season:
| 10 | (Morocco) | MF | Abdelkarim Kissi | 0 | 0 | 1 | 0 | 0 | 0 | 0 | 0 | 1 | 0 |
| Total | | | | 54 | 2 | 3 | 0 | 2 | 0 | 7 | 1 | 66 | 3 |
