= FC Rubin Kazan in European football =

Overview of FC Rubin Kazan's role in European football

Rubin Kazan in European football
- Club: Rubin Kazan
- First entry: 2004–05 UEFA Cup
- Latest entry: 2021–22 UEFA Europa Conference League

Rubin Kazan is a Russian football club based in Kazan, Russia.

== History ==
Rubin Kazan reached the Quarter-finals of the 2012–13 UEFA Europa League, where they were knocked out by Chelsea. Chelsea won the first leg 3-1 at Stamford Bridge, whilst Rubin won the second leg 3-2 at the Luzhniki Stadium in Moscow after the game was moved from Rubin's regular Central Stadium in Kazan due to safety concerns with the ground.

In 2022, the European Club Association suspended Rostov, citing the Russian invasion of Ukraine.

=== Matches ===
| Season | Competition | Round | Club | Home | Away | Aggregate |
|---|---|---|---|---|---|---|
| 2004–05 | UEFA Cup | 2QR | (Austria) Rapid Wien | 0–3 | 2–0 | 2–3 |
| 2006–07 | UEFA Cup | 2QR | (Belarus) BATE Borisov | 3–0 | 2–0 | 5–0 |
| 2006–07 | UEFA Cup | 1R | (Italy) Parma | 0–1 | 0–1 | 0–2 |
| 2007 | UEFA Intertoto Cup | 2R | (Hungary) Zalaegerszegi | 3–0 | 2–0 | 5–0 |
| 2007 | UEFA Intertoto Cup | 3R | (Austria) Rapid Wien | 0–0 | 1–3 | 1–3 |
| 2009–10 | UEFA Champions League | Group F | (Ukraine) Dynamo Kyiv | 0–0 | 1–3 | 3rd |
| 2009–10 | UEFA Champions League | Group F | (Italy) Inter Milan | 0–0 | 0–2 | 3rd |
| 2009–10 | UEFA Champions League | Group F | (Spain) Barcelona | 0–0 | 2–1 | 3rd |
| 2009–10 | UEFA Europa League | R32 | (Israel) Hapoel Tel Aviv | 3–0 | 0–0 | 3–0 |
| 2009–10 | UEFA Europa League | R16 | (Germany) VfL Wolfsburg | 1–1 | 1–2 (a.e.t.) | 2–3 |
| 2010–11 | UEFA Champions League | Group D | (Denmark) Copenhagen | 1–0 | 0–1 | 3rd |
| 2010–11 | UEFA Champions League | Group D | (Spain) Barcelona | 1–1 | 0–2 | 3rd |
| 2010–11 | UEFA Champions League | Group D | (Greece) Panathinaikos | 0–0 | 0–0 | 3rd |
| 2010–11 | UEFA Europa League | R32 | (Netherlands) Twente | 0–2 | 2–2 | 2–4 |
| 2011–12 | UEFA Champions League | 3QR | (Ukraine) Dynamo Kyiv | 2–1 | 2–0 | 4–1 |
| 2011–12 | UEFA Champions League | PO | (France) Olympique Lyonnais | 1–1 | 1–3 | 2–4 |
| 2011–12 | UEFA Europa League | Group A | (England) Tottenham Hotspur | 1–0 | 0–1 | 2nd |
| 2011–12 | UEFA Europa League | Group A | (Greece) PAOK | 2–2 | 1–1 | 2nd |
| 2011–12 | UEFA Europa League | Group A | (Republic of Ireland) Shamrock Rovers | 4–1 | 3–0 | 2nd |
| 2011–12 | UEFA Europa League | R32 | (Greece) Olympiacos | 0–1 | 0–1 | 0–2 |
| 2012–13 | UEFA Europa League | Group H | (Italy) Inter Milan | 3–0 | 2–2 | 1st |
| 2012–13 | UEFA Europa League | Group H | (Serbia) Partizan | 2–0 | 1–1 | 1st |
| 2012–13 | UEFA Europa League | Group H | (Azerbaijan) Neftçi | 1–0 | 1–0 | 1st |
| 2012–13 | UEFA Europa League | R32 | (Spain) Atlético Madrid | 0–1 | 2–0 | 2–1 |
| 2012–13 | UEFA Europa League | R16 | (Spain) Levante | 2–0 (a.e.t.) | 0–0 | 2–0 |
| 2012–13 | UEFA Europa League | QF | (England) Chelsea | 3–2 | 1–3 | 4–5 |
| 2013–14 | UEFA Europa League | 2QR | (Serbia) Jagodina | 1–0 | 3–2 | 4–2 |
| 2013–14 | UEFA Europa League | 3QR | (Denmark) Randers | 2–0 | 2–1 | 4–1 |
| 2013–14 | UEFA Europa League | PO | (Norway) Molde | 3–0 | 2–0 | 5–0 |
| 2013–14 | UEFA Europa League | Group D | (England) Wigan Athletic | 1–0 | 1–1 | 1st |
| 2013–14 | UEFA Europa League | Group D | (Slovenia) Maribor | 1–1 | 5–2 | 1st |
| 2013–14 | UEFA Europa League | Group D | (Belgium) Zulte Waregem | 4–0 | 2–0 | 1st |
| 2013–14 | UEFA Europa League | R32 | (Spain) Real Betis | 0–2 | 1–1 | 1–3 |
| 2015–16 | UEFA Europa League | 3QR | (Austria) Sturm Graz | 1–1 | 3–2 | 4–3 |
| 2015–16 | UEFA Europa League | PO | (North Macedonia) Rabotnichki | 1–0 | 1–1 | 2–1 |
| 2015–16 | UEFA Europa League | Group B | (England) Liverpool | 0–1 | 1–1 | 3rd |
| 2015–16 | UEFA Europa League | Group B | (France) Girondins de Bordeaux | 0–0 | 2–2 | 3rd |
| 2015–16 | UEFA Europa League | Group B | (Switzerland) Sion | 2–0 | 1–2 | 3rd |
| 2021–22 | UEFA Europa Conference League | 3QR | (Poland) Raków Częstochowa | 0–1 (a.e.t.) | 0–0 | 0–1 |

== Player statistics ==
=== Appearances ===
As of match played 12 August 2021

| | Name | Years | UEFA Cup | UEFA Intertoto Cup | UEFA Champions League | UEFA Europa League | UEFA Europa Conference League | Total | Ratio |
|---|---|---|---|---|---|---|---|---|---|
| 1 | (Russia) Sergey Ryzhikov | 2008-2018 | (-) | (-) | 16 (0) | 43 (0) | (-) | 59 (0) | 0 |
| 2 | (Turkey) Gökdeniz Karadeniz | 2008-2018 | (-) | (-) | 16 (1) | 41 (9) | (-) | 57 (10) | 0.18 |
| 3 | (Spain) César Navas | 2009-2015, 2017-2018 | (-) | (-) | 11 (0) | 31 (1) | (-) | 42 (1) | 0.02 |
| 4 | (Israel) Bibars Natcho | 2010-2014 | (-) | (-) | 8 (2) | 32 (9) | (-) | 40 (11) | 0.28 |
| 4 | (Russia) Aleksandr Ryazantsev | 2006-2013 | 2 (0) | 4 (1) | 11 (1) | 24 (4) | (-) | 41 (6) | 0.15 |
| 6 | (Russia) Oleg Kuzmin | 2010-2018 | (-) | (-) | 3 (0) | 34 (2) | (-) | 37 (2) | 0.05 |
| 7 | (Russia) Roman Sharonov | 1999-2004, 2008-2014 | 2 (0) | (-) | 9 (0) | 22 (0) | (-) | 33 (0) | 0 |
| 7 | (Argentina) Cristian Ansaldi | 2008-2013 | (-) | (-) | 12 (0) | 21 (0) | (-) | 33 (0) | 0 |
| 7 | (Russia) Alan Kasaev | 2009-2014 | (-) | (-) | 12 (1) | 21 (2) | (-) | 33 (3) | 0.09 |
| 10 | (Ecuador) Christian Noboa | 2007-2012, 2018 | (-) | 3 (0) | 16 (2) | 12 (3) | (-) | 31 (5) | 0.16 |
| 11 | (Russia) Vitali Kaleshin | 2009, 2010-2013 | 2 (0) | (-) | 14 (0) | 14 (0) | (-) | 28 (0) | 0 |
| 12 | (Russia) Vladimir Dyadyun | 2007-2013, 2014-2017 | (-) | (-) | 2 (4) | 3 (22) | (-) | 5 (26) | 0.19 |
| 13 | (Italy) Salvatore Bocchetti | 2010-2013 | (-) | (-) | 9 (0) | 14 (0) | (-) | 23 (0) | 0 |
| 14 | (Belarus) Syarhey Kislyak | 2011-2016 | (-) | (-) | 3 (0) | 19 (0) | (-) | 22 (0) | 0 |
| 15 | (Spain) Iván Marcano | 2012-2014 | (-) | (-) | (-) | 21 (2) | (-) | 21 (2) | 0.1 |
| 15 | (Finland) Roman Eremenko | 2013-2014 | (-) | (-) | (-) | 21 (5) | (-) | 21 (5) | 0.24 |
| 17 | (Venezuela) Salomón Rondón | 2012-2014 | (-) | (-) | (-) | 20 (11) | (-) | 20 (11) | 0.55 |
| 18 | (Georgia (country)) Solomon Kvirkvelia | 2010-2017 | (-) | (-) | 4 (0) | 13 (0) | (-) | 17 (0) | 0 |
| 19 | (Georgia (country)) Lasha Salukvadze | 2005-2010 | 1 (0) | 2 (0) | 8 (0) | 4 (0) | (-) | 15 (0) | 0 |
| 19 | (Brazil) Carlos Eduardo | 2010-2016 | (-) | (-) | 2 (0) | 12 (1) | (-) | 14 (1) | 0.07 |
| 21 | (South Africa) MacBeth Sibaya | 2003-2010 | 5 (0) | 4 (0) | 2 (0) | 2 (0) | (-) | 13 (0) | 0 |
| 21 | (Nigeria) Obafemi Martins | 2010-2012 | (-) | (-) | 6 (0) | 7 (2) | (-) | 13 (2) | 0.15 |
| 21 | (France) Yann M'Vila | 2013-2018 | (-) | 2 (0) | 8 (0) | 4 (0) | (-) | 13 (0) | 0 |
| 24 | (Spain) Pablo Orbaiz | 2012-2013 | (-) | (-) | (-) | 12 (1) | (-) | 12 (1) | 0.08 |
| 25 | (Argentina) Alejandro Domínguez | 2004-2007, 2009-2010 | 4 (2) | (-) | 6 (2) | (-) | (-) | 10 (4) | 0.4 |
| 25 | (Russia) Pyotr Bystrov | 2009-2012 | (-) | (-) | 5 (0) | 5 (0) | (-) | 10 (0) | 0 |
| 25 | (Poland) Rafał Murawski | 2009-2010 | (-) | (-) | 6 (0) | 4 (0) | (-) | 10 (0) | 0 |
| 25 | (Russia) Aleksandr Prudnikov | 2013-2014 | (-) | (-) | (-) | 10 (3) | (-) | 10 (3) | 0.3 |
| 25 | (Russia) Magomed Ozdoyev | 2014-2015, 2015-2018 | (-) | (-) | (-) | 10 (0) | (-) | 10 (0) | 0 |
| 25 | (Russia) Maksim Kanunnikov | 2014-2018 | (-) | (-) | (-) | 10 (3) | (-) | 10 (3) | 0.3 |
| 32 | (Turkmenistan) Wladimir Baýramow | 2003-2007 | 5 (0) | 4 (0) | (-) | (0) | (-) | 9 (0) | 0 |
| 32 | (Russia) Vladislav Kulik | 2013-2017 | (-) | (-) | (-) | 9 (0) | (-) | 9 (0) | 0 |
| 32 | (Russia) Dmitri Torbinski | 2013-2014 | (-) | (-) | (-) | 9 (1) | (-) | 9 (1) | 0.11 |
| 32 | (Bulgaria) Blagoy Georgiev | 2014-2016 | (-) | (-) | (-) | 9 (1) | (-) | 9 (1) | 0.11 |
| 32 | (Russia) Ruslan Kambolov | 2014-2019 | (-) | (-) | (-) | 9 (0) | (-) | 9 (0) | 0 |
| 36 | (Russia) Sergei Semak | 2008-2010 | (-) | (-) | 6 (0) | 8 (1) | (-) | 8 (1) | 0.13 |
| 36 | (Russia) Aleksandr Bukharov | 2005-2010, 2018-2019 | (-) | (-) | 4 (0) | 4 (2) | (-) | 8 (2) | 0.25 |
| 36 | (Russia) Aleksei Medvedev | 2010-2011 | (-) | (-) | 7 (1) | 1 (1) | (-) | 8 (1) | 0.13 |
| 36 | (Russia) Igor Portnyagin | 2008-2016 | (-) | (-) | (-) | 8 (1) | (-) | 8 (1) | 0.13 |
| 36 | (Paraguay) Nelson Valdez | 2011-2013 | (-) | (-) | (-) | 8 (3) | (-) | 8 (3) | 0.38 |
| 36 | (Lithuania) Giedrius Arlauskis | 2010-2014 | (-) | (-) | (-) | 8 (0) | (-) | 8 (0) | 0 |
| 36 | (Ukraine) Marko Dević | 2014-2016 | (-) | (-) | (-) | 8 (2) | (-) | 8 (2) | 0.25 |
| 36 | (Democratic Republic of the Congo) Chris Mavinga | 2013-2017 | (-) | (-) | (-) | 8 (0) | (-) | 8 (0) | 0 |
| 36 | (Russia) Elmir Nabiullin | 2014-2018, 2023 | (-) | (-) | (-) | 8 (0) | (-) | 8 (0) | 0 |
| 45 | (Brazil) Gabriel Atz | 2006-2009 | 4 (0) | 3 (0) | (-) | (-) | (-) | 7 (0) | 0 |
| 45 | (Latvia) Aleksandrs Koliņko | 2005-2008 | 3 (0) | 4 (0) | (-) | (-) | (-) | 7 (0) | 0 |
| 45 | (Russia) Pyotr Nemov | 2011-2012 | (-) | (-) | 3 (0) | 4 (0) | (-) | 7 (0) | 0 |
| 45 | (Russia) Diniyar Bilyaletdinov | 2015-2017 | (-) | (-) | (-) | 7 (0) | (-) | 7 (0) | 0 |
| 45 | (Russia) Mikhail Sinev | 2002-2007 | 3 (0) | 4 (0) | (-) | (-) | (-) | 7 (0) | 0 |
| 45 | (Russia) Dmitri Vasilyev | 2005-2006 | 3 (0) | 4 (0) | (-) | (-) | (-) | 7 (0) | 0 |
| 51 | (Uruguay) Andrés Scotti | 2003-2006 | 6 (0) | (-) | (-) | (-) | (-) | 6 (0) | 0 |
| 51 | (Uruguay) Guillermo Cotugno | 2015-2017 | (-) | (-) | (-) | 6 (0) | (-) | 6 (0) | 0 |
| 53 | (Belarus) Sergei Kornilenko | 2010 | (-) | (-) | 5 (0) | (-) | (-) | 5 (0) | 0 |
| 53 | (Russia) Igor Lebedenko | 2011 | (-) | (-) | 3 (0) | 2 (0) | (-) | 5 (0) | 0 |
| 53 | (Russia) Ruslan Mukhametshin | 2013-2015 | (-) | (-) | (-) | 5 (0) | (-) | 5 (0) | 0 |
| 53 | (Azerbaijan) Ruslan Abishov | 2013-2015 | (-) | (-) | (-) | 5 (0) | (-) | 5 (0) | 0 |
| 57 | (Brazil) Calisto | 2003-2007 | 4 (0) | (-) | (-) | (-) | (-) | 4 (0) | 0 |
| 57 | (Brazil) Baiano | 2006-2008 | 4 (0) | (-) | (-) | (-) | (-) | 4 (0) | 0 |
| 57 | (Norway) Jørgen Jalland | 2005-2006 | 4 (0) | (-) | (-) | (-) | (-) | 4 (0) | 0 |
| 57 | (Moldova) Alexandru Gațcan | 2006-2008 | 2 (0) | 2 (0) | (-) | (-) | (-) | 4 (0) | 0 |
| 57 | (Brazil) Jean | 2007 | (-) | 4 (1) | (-) | (-) | (-) | 4 (1) | 0.25 |
| 57 | (Russia) Vitali Volkov | 2007 | (-) | 4 (4) | (-) | (-) | (-) | 4 (4) | 1 |
| 57 | (Russia) Ansar Ayupov | 2004-2007 | (-) | 4 (0) | (-) | (-) | (-) | 4 (0) | 0 |
| 57 | (Russia) Yevgeni Balyaikin | 2007-2012 | (-) | (-) | 1 (0) | 3 (0) | (-) | 4 (0) | 0 |
| 57 | (Ghana) Mubarak Wakaso | 2004-2007 | (-) | (-) | (-) | 4 (0) | (-) | 4 (0) | 0 |
| 66 | (Tunisia) Selim Benachour | 2006-2008 | 3 (0) | (-) | (-) | (-) | (-) | 3 (0) | 0 |
| 66 | (Uzbekistan) Andrei Fyodorov | 2000-2008 | (-) | 3 (0) | (-) | (-) | (-) | 3 (0) | 0 |
| 66 | (Russia) Aleksandr Orekhov | 2008-2014 | (-) | (-) | 1 (0) | 2 (0) | (-) | 3 (0) | 0 |
| 66 | (Turkey) Hasan Kabze | 2007-2010 | (-) | (-) | 0 (0) | 3 (0) | (-) | 3 (0) | 0 |
| 66 | (Finland) Alexei Eremenko | 2011-2012 | (-) | (-) | 0 (0) | 3 (0) | (-) | 3 (0) | 0 |
| 66 | (Russia) Sergei Davydov | 2012-2016 | (-) | (-) | 0 (0) | 3 (0) | (-) | 3 (0) | 0 |
| 66 | (Russia) Inal Getigezhev | 2013-2017 | (-) | (-) | 0 (0) | 3 (0) | (-) | 3 (0) | 0 |
| 66 | (Russia) Maksim Batov | 2015-2016 | (-) | (-) | 0 (0) | 3 (0) | (-) | 3 (0) | 0 |
| 66 | (Russia) Vitali Ustinov | 2011-2013, 2014-2019 | (-) | (-) | (-) | 3 (1) | (-) | 3 (1) | 0.33 |
| 66 | (Russia) Aleksandr Yarkin | 2006-2009 | 1 (0) | 2 (0) | (-) | (-) | (-) | 3 (0) | 0 |
| 76 | (Russia) Sergei Kozko | 2002-2004 | 2 (0) | (-) | (-) | (-) | (-) | 2 (0) | 0 |
| 76 | (Czech Republic) Adam Petrouš | 2004-2005 | 2 (0) | (-) | (-) | (-) | (-) | 2 (0) | 0 |
| 76 | (Russia) Andrei Konovalov | 2002-2005 | 2 (0) | (-) | (-) | (-) | (-) | 2 (0) | 0 |
| 76 | (Russia) Denis Boyarintsev | 2001-2004 | 2 (1) | (-) | (-) | (-) | (-) | 2 (1) | 0.5 |
| 76 | (The Gambia) Ebrima Ebou Sillah | 2003-2006 | 2 (0) | (-) | (-) | (-) | (-) | 2 (0) | 0 |
| 76 | (Russia) Konstantin Skrylnikov | 2006 | 2 (0) | (-) | (-) | (-) | (-) | 2 (0) | 0 |
| 76 | (South Korea) Kim Dong-hyun | 2006 | 2 (0) | (-) | (-) | (-) | (-) | 2 (0) | 0 |
| 76 | (Russia) Andrei Kireyev | 2006-2007 | (-) | 2 (0) | (-) | (-) | (-) | 2 (0) | 0 |
| 76 | (Russia) Sergei Budylin | 2007 | (-) | 2 (0) | (-) | (-) | (-) | 2 (0) | 0 |
| 76 | (Russia) Aleksei Popov | 2008-2010 | (-) | (-) | 2 (0) | (-) | (-) | 2 (0) | 0 |
| 76 | (Russia) Andrei Gorbanets | 2009-2011 | (-) | (-) | 0 (0) | 2 (0) | (-) | 2 (0) | 0 |
| 76 | (Russia) Alisher Dzhalilov (Note: Dzhalilov was born in Latakhorak, Tajikistan, but qualified and represented Russia at various Youth levels before representing Tajikistan at senior level after leaving Rubin Kazan.) | 2009-2017 | (-) | (-) | 1 (0) | 1 (0) | (-) | 2 (0) | 0 |
| 76 | (Turkey) Gökhan Töre | 2012-2014 | (-) | (-) | (-) | 2 (0) | (-) | 2 (0) | 0 |
| 76 | (Russia) Taras Burlak | 2014-2017 | (-) | (-) | (-) | 2 (0) | (-) | 2 (0) | 0 |
| 76 | (Russia) Pavel Mogilevets | 2014, 2018-2020 | (-) | (-) | (-) | 2 (0) | (-) | 2 (0) | 0 |
| 76 | (Russia) Kamil Mullin | 2014-2017, 2022-2023 | (-) | (-) | (-) | 2 (0) | (-) | 2 (0) | 0 |
| 76 | (Iran) Sardar Azmoun | 2013-2016, 2017-2019 | (-) | (-) | (-) | 2 (1) | (-) | 2 (1) | 0.5 |
| 76 | (Russia) Ilzat Akhmetov (Note: Akhmetov was born in Bishkek, Kyrgyzstan, but qualified and represented Russia at various Youth levels before representing Russia at senior level after leaving Rubin Kazan.) | 2014-2018 | (-) | (-) | (-) | 2 (0) | (-) | 2 (0) | 0 |
| 76 | (Uruguay) Mauricio Lemos | 2015-2016 | (-) | (-) | (-) | 2 (0) | (-) | 2 (0) | 0 |
| 76 | (Russia) Soltmurad Bakayev | 2020-2024 | (-) | (-) | (-) | (-) | 2 (0) | 2 (0) | 0 |
| 76 | (Russia) Mikhail Kostyukov | 2021-2024 | (-) | (-) | (-) | (-) | 2 (0) | 2 (0) | 0 |
| 76 | (Russia) Vladislav Ignatyev | 2021-2022 | (-) | (-) | (-) | (-) | 2 (0) | 2 (0) | 0 |
| 76 | (Russia) Yury Dyupin | 2019-2024 | (-) | (-) | (-) | (-) | 2 (0) | 2 (0) | 0 |
| 76 | (Denmark) Oliver Abildgaard | 2020-2023 | (-) | (-) | (-) | (-) | 2 (0) | 2 (0) | 0 |
| 76 | (Russia) Georgi Zotov | 2020-2022 | (-) | (-) | (-) | (-) | 2 (0) | 2 (0) | 0 |
| 76 | (Russia) Leon Musayev | 2021-2024 | (-) | (-) | (-) | (-) | 2 (0) | 2 (0) | 0 |
| 76 | (Croatia) Silvije Begić | 2019-2022 | (-) | (-) | (-) | (-) | 2 (0) | 2 (0) | 0 |
| 76 | (Croatia) Filip Uremović | 2018-2022 | (-) | (-) | (-) | (-) | 2 (0) | 2 (0) | 0 |
| 76 | (Georgia (country)) Khvicha Kvaratskhelia | 2019-2022 | (-) | (-) | (-) | (-) | 2 (0) | 2 (0) | 0 |
| 76 | (Montenegro) Sead Hakšabanović (Note: Hakšabanović was born in Hyltebruk, Sweden, representing them at U19 level before switching to represent Montenegro in 2017.) | 2021-2022 | (-) | (-) | (-) | (-) | 2 (0) | 2 (0) | 0 |
| 76 | (Switzerland) Darko Jevtić | 2020-2024 | (-) | (-) | (-) | (-) | 2 (0) | 2 (0) | 0 |
| 107 | (Brazil) Rôni | 2003-2005 | 1 (1) | (-) | (-) | (-) | (-) | 1 (1) | 1 |
| 107 | (Latvia) Vitālijs Astafjevs | 2004-2005 | 1 (0) | (-) | (-) | (-) | (-) | 1 (0) | 0 |
| 107 | (Czech Republic) Richard Dostálek | 2004 | 1 (0) | (-) | (-) | (-) | (-) | 1 (0) | 0 |
| 107 | (Belgium) Cédric Roussel | 2004 | 1 (0) | (-) | (-) | (-) | (-) | 1 (0) | 0 |
| 107 | (Czech Republic) Tomáš Čížek | 2003-2005 | 1 (0) | (-) | (-) | (-) | (-) | 1 (0) | 0 |
| 107 | (Georgia (country)) Nukri Revishvili | 2006-2009 | 1 (0) | (-) | (-) | (-) | (-) | 1 (0) | 0 |
| 107 | (Russia) Dzhambulad Bazayev | 2006-2007 | 1 (1) | (-) | (-) | (-) | (-) | 1 (1) | 1 |
| 107 | (Georgia (country)) Mikheil Ashvetia | 2006 | 1 (2) | (-) | (-) | (-) | (-) | 1 (2) | 2 |
| 107 | (Georgia (country)) Georgi Kinkladze | 2005-2006 | 1 (0) | (-) | (-) | (-) | (-) | 1 (0) | 0 |
| 107 | (Russia) Pyotr Gitselov | 2007-2009 | (-) | 1 (0) | (-) | (-) | (-) | 1 (0) | 0 |
| 107 | (Portugal) Fábio Felício | 2007-2009 | (-) | 1 (0) | (-) | (-) | (-) | 1 (0) | 0 |
| 107 | (Russia) Sergei Nesterenko | 2007-2010 | (-) | 1 (0) | (-) | (-) | (-) | 1 (0) | 0 |
| 107 | (Uzbekistan) Vagiz Galiulin | 2006-2014 | (-) | 1 (0) | (-) | (-) | (-) | 1 (0) | 0 |
| 107 | (Russia) Nikita Medvedev | 2020-2022 | (-) | (-) | (-) | (-) | 1 (0) | 1 (0) | 0 |
| 107 | (Russia) Aleksandr Zuyev | 2019-2020, 2020-2022 | (-) | (-) | (-) | (-) | 1 (0) | 1 (0) | 0 |
| 107 | (Russia) Ilya Samoshnikov | 2020-2023 | (-) | (-) | (-) | (-) | 1 (0) | 1 (0) | 0 |
| 107 | (South Korea) Hwang In-beom | 2020-2022 | (-) | (-) | (-) | (-) | 1 (0) | 1 (0) | 0 |
| 107 | (Russia) Ivan Ignatyev | 2020-2022 | (-) | (-) | (-) | (-) | 1 (0) | 1 (0) | 0 |
| 107 | (Russia) Oleg Shatov | 2020-2021 | (-) | (-) | (-) | (-) | 1 (0) | 1 (0) | 0 |
| 107 | (Serbia) Đorđe Despotović | 2020-2022 | (-) | (-) | (-) | (-) | 1 (0) | 1 (0) | 0 |
| 107 | (Japan) Mitsuki Saito | 2021 | (-) | (-) | (-) | (-) | 1 (0) | 1 (0) | 0 |

=== Goalscorers ===
As of match played 12 August 2021

| | Name | Years | UEFA Cup | UEFA Intertoto Cup | UEFA Champions League | UEFA Europa League | UEFA Europa Conference League | Total | Ratio |
|---|---|---|---|---|---|---|---|---|---|
| 1 | (Israel) Bibars Natcho | 2010-2014 | (-) | (-) | 2 (8) | 9 (32) | (-) | 11 (40) | 0.28 |
| 1 | (Venezuela) Salomón Rondón | 2012-2014 | (-) | (-) | (-) | 11 (20) | (-) | 11 (20) | 0.55 |
| 3 | (Turkey) Gökdeniz Karadeniz | 2008-2018 | (-) | (-) | 1 (16) | 9 (41) | (-) | 10 (57) | 0.18 |
| 4 | (Russia) Aleksandr Ryazantsev | 2006-2013 | 0 (2) | 1 (4) | 1 (11) | 4 (24) | (-) | 6 (41) | 0.15 |
| 5 | (Ecuador) Christian Noboa | 2007-2012, 2018 | (-) | 0 (3) | 2 (16) | 3 (12) | (-) | 5 (31) | 0.16 |
| 5 | (Russia) Vladimir Dyadyun | 2007-2013, 2014-2017 | (-) | (-) | 2 (4) | 3 (22) | (-) | 5 (26) | 0.19 |
| 5 | (Finland) Roman Eremenko | 2013-2014 | (-) | (-) | (-) | 5 (21) | (-) | 5 (21) | 0.24 |
| 8 | (Russia) Vitali Volkov | 2007 | (-) | 4 (4) | (-) | (-) | (-) | 4 (4) | 1 |
| 8 | (Argentina) Alejandro Domínguez | 2004-2007, 2009-2010 | 2 (4) | (-) | 2 (6) | (-) | (-) | 4 (10) | 0.4 |
| 10 | (Russia) Alan Kasaev | 2009-2014 | (-) | (-) | 1 (12) | 2 (21) | (-) | 3 (33) | 0.09 |
| 10 | (Paraguay) Nelson Valdez | 2011-2013 | (-) | (-) | (-) | 3 (8) | (-) | 3 (8) | 0.38 |
| 10 | (Russia) Aleksandr Prudnikov | 2013-2014 | (-) | (-) | (-) | 3 (10) | (-) | 3 (10) | 0.3 |
| 10 | (Russia) Maksim Kanunnikov | 2014-2018 | (-) | (-) | (-) | 3 (10) | (-) | 3 (10) | 0.3 |
| 14 | (Georgia (country)) Mikheil Ashvetia | 2006 | 2 (1) | (-) | (-) | (-) | (-) | 2 (1) | 2 |
| 14 | (Russia) Aleksandr Bukharov | 2005-2010, 2018-2019 | (-) | (-) | 0 (4) | 2 (4) | (-) | 2 (8) | 0.25 |
| 14 | (Nigeria) Obafemi Martins | 2010-2012 | (-) | (-) | 0 (6) | 2 (7) | (-) | 2 (13) | 0.15 |
| 14 | (Spain) Iván Marcano | 2012-2014 | (-) | (-) | (-) | 2 (21) | (-) | 2 (21) | 0.1 |
| 14 | (Russia) Oleg Kuzmin | 2010-2018 | (-) | (-) | 0 (3) | 2 (34) | (-) | 2 (37) | 0.05 |
| 14 | (Ukraine) Marko Dević | 2014-2016 | (-) | (-) | (-) | 2 (8) | (-) | 2 (8) | 0.25 |
| 20 | (Brazil) Rôni | 2003-2005 | 1 (1) | (-) | (-) | (-) | (-) | 1 (1) | 1 |
| 20 | (Russia) Denis Boyarintsev | 2001-2004 | 1 (2) | (-) | (-) | (-) | (-) | 1 (2) | 0.5 |
| 20 | (Russia) Dzhambulad Bazayev | 2006-2007 | 1 (1) | (-) | (-) | (-) | (-) | 1 (1) | 1 |
| 20 | (Brazil) Jean | 2007 | (-) | 1 (4) | (-) | (-) | (-) | 1 (4) | 0.25 |
| 20 | (Russia) Sergei Semak | 2008-2010 | (-) | (-) | 0 (6) | 1 (2) | (-) | 1 (8) | 0.13 |
| 20 | (Argentina) Cristian Ansaldi | 2008-2013 | (-) | (-) | 0 (12) | 1 (22) | (-) | 1 (34) | 0.03 |
| 20 | (Russia) Aleksei Medvedev | 2010-2011 | (-) | (-) | 1 (7) | 0 (1) | (-) | 1 (8) | 0.13 |
| 20 | (Spain) Pablo Orbaiz | 2012-2013 | (-) | (-) | (-) | 1 (12) | (-) | 1 (12) | 0.08 |
| 20 | (Russia) Dmitri Torbinski | 2013-2014 | (-) | (-) | (-) | 1 (9) | (-) | 1 (9) | 0.11 |
| 20 | (Spain) César Navas | 2009-2015, 2017-2018 | (-) | (-) | 0 (11) | 1 (31) | (-) | 1 (42) | 0.02 |
| 20 | (Iran) Sardar Azmoun | 2013-2016, 2017-2019 | (-) | (-) | (-) | 1 (2) | (-) | 1 (2) | 0.5 |
| 20 | (Russia) Igor Portnyagin | 2008-2016 | (-) | (-) | (-) | 1 (8) | (-) | 1 (8) | 0.13 |
| 20 | (Brazil) Carlos Eduardo | 2010-2016 | (-) | (-) | 0 (2) | 1 (12) | (-) | 1 (12) | 0.08 |
| 20 | (Bulgaria) Blagoy Georgiev | 2014-2016 | (-) | (-) | (-) | 1 (9) | (-) | 1 (9) | 0.11 |
| 20 | (Russia) Vitali Ustinov | 2011-2013, 2014-2019 | (-) | (-) | (-) | 1 (3) | (-) | 1 (3) | 0.33 |
| 20 | Own goal | 2004-2021 | 0 (6) | 0 (4) | 0 (16) | 1 (50) | 0 (2) | 1 (78) | 0.01 |

=== Clean sheets ===
As of match played 12 August 2021

| | Name | Years | UEFA Cup | UEFA Intertoto Cup | UEFA Champions League | UEFA Europa League | UEFA Europa Conference League | Total | Ratio |
|---|---|---|---|---|---|---|---|---|---|
| 1 | (Russia) Sergey Ryzhikov | 2008-2018 | (-) | (-) | 6 (16) | 18 (43) | (-) | 24 (59) | 0.41 |
| 2 | (Latvia) Aleksandrs Koliņko | 2005-2008 | 1 (3) | 3 (4) | (-) | (-) | (-) | 4 (7) | 0.57 |
| 3 | (Lithuania) Giedrius Arlauskis | 2010-2014 | (-) | (-) | (-) | 2 (8) | (-) | 2 (8) | 0.25 |
| 4 | (Russia) Sergei Kozko | 2002-2004 | 1 (2) | (-) | (-) | (-) | (-) | 1 (2) | 0.5 |
| 4 | (Georgia (country)) Nukri Revishvili | 2006-2009 | 1 (1) | (-) | (-) | (-) | (-) | 1 (1) | 1 |
| 4 | (Russia) Yury Dyupin | 2019-2024 | (-) | (-) | (-) | (-) | 1 (2) | 1 (2) | 0.5 |
| 7 | (Russia) Nikita Medvedev | 2020-2022 | (-) | (-) | (-) | (-) | 0 (1) | 0 (1) | 0 |

== Overall record ==
=== By competition ===
As of match played 12 August 2021

| Competition | Pld | W | D | L | GF | GA |
|---|---|---|---|---|---|---|
| UEFA Cup | 6 | 3 | 0 | 3 | 7 | 5 |
| UEFA Intertoto Cup | 4 | 2 | 1 | 1 | 6 | 3 |
| UEFA Champions League | 16 | 4 | 7 | 5 | 12 | 16 |
| UEFA Europa League | 50 | 24 | 16 | 10 | 76 | 43 |
| UEFA Europa Conference League | 2 | 0 | 1 | 1 | 0 | 1 |
| Total | 78 | 33 | 25 | 20 | 101 | 68 |

=== By country ===
As of match played 12 August 2021

| Country | Played | Win | Draw | Lost | Goals For | Goals Against | Goal Difference | Win% |
|---|---|---|---|---|---|---|---|---|
| Austria | 6 | 2 | 2 | 2 | 7 | 9 | −2 | 33.33 |
| Azerbaijan | 2 | 2 | 0 | 0 | 2 | 0 | +2 | 100.00 |
| Belarus | 2 | 2 | 0 | 0 | 5 | 0 | +5 | 100.00 |
| Belgium | 2 | 2 | 0 | 0 | 6 | 0 | +6 | 100.00 |
| Denmark | 4 | 3 | 0 | 1 | 5 | 2 | +3 | 75.00 |
| England | 8 | 3 | 2 | 3 | 8 | 9 | −1 | 37.50 |
| France | 4 | 0 | 3 | 1 | 4 | 6 | −2 | 0.00 |
| Germany | 2 | 0 | 1 | 1 | 2 | 3 | −1 | 0.00 |
| Greece | 6 | 0 | 4 | 2 | 3 | 5 | −2 | 0.00 |
| Hungary | 2 | 2 | 0 | 0 | 5 | 0 | +5 | 100.00 |
| Ireland | 2 | 2 | 0 | 0 | 7 | 1 | +6 | 100.00 |
| Israel | 2 | 1 | 1 | 0 | 3 | 0 | +3 | 50.00 |
| Italy | 6 | 1 | 2 | 3 | 6 | 7 | −1 | 16.67 |
| North Macedonia | 2 | 1 | 1 | 0 | 2 | 1 | +1 | 50.00 |
| Netherlands | 2 | 0 | 1 | 1 | 2 | 4 | −2 | 0.00 |
| Norway | 2 | 2 | 0 | 0 | 5 | 0 | +5 | 100.00 |
| Poland | 2 | 0 | 1 | 1 | 0 | 1 | −1 | 0.00 |
| Serbia | 4 | 3 | 1 | 0 | 7 | 3 | +4 | 75.00 |
| Slovenia | 2 | 1 | 1 | 0 | 6 | 3 | +3 | 50.00 |
| Spain | 10 | 3 | 4 | 3 | 8 | 8 | +0 | 30.00 |
| Switzerland | 2 | 1 | 0 | 1 | 3 | 2 | +1 | 50.00 |
| Ukraine | 4 | 2 | 1 | 1 | 5 | 4 | +1 | 50.00 |

=== By club ===
As of match played 12 August 2021

| Club | Played | Win | Draw | Lost | Goals For | Goals Against | Goal Difference | Win% |
|---|---|---|---|---|---|---|---|---|
| (Austria) Rapid Wien | 4 | 1 | 1 | 2 | 3 | 6 | −3 | 25.00 |
| (Austria) Sturm Graz | 2 | 1 | 1 | 0 | 4 | 3 | +1 | 50.00 |
| (Azerbaijan) Neftçi | 2 | 2 | 0 | 0 | 2 | 0 | +2 | 100.00 |
| (Belarus) BATE Borisov | 2 | 2 | 0 | 0 | 5 | 0 | +5 | 100.00 |
| (Belgium) Zulte Waregem | 2 | 2 | 0 | 0 | 6 | 0 | +6 | 100.00 |
| (Denmark) Copenhagen | 2 | 1 | 0 | 1 | 1 | 1 | +0 | 50.00 |
| (Denmark) Randers | 2 | 2 | 0 | 0 | 4 | 1 | +3 | 100.00 |
| (England) Chelsea | 2 | 1 | 0 | 1 | 4 | 5 | −1 | 50.00 |
| (England) Liverpool | 2 | 0 | 1 | 1 | 1 | 2 | −1 | 0.00 |
| (England) Tottenham Hotspur | 2 | 1 | 0 | 1 | 1 | 1 | +0 | 50.00 |
| (England) Wigan Athletic | 2 | 1 | 1 | 0 | 2 | 1 | +1 | 50.00 |
| (France) Girondins de Bordeaux | 2 | 0 | 2 | 0 | 2 | 2 | +0 | 0.00 |
| (France) Olympique Lyonnais | 2 | 0 | 1 | 1 | 2 | 4 | −2 | 0.00 |
| (Germany) VfL Wolfsburg | 2 | 0 | 1 | 1 | 2 | 3 | −1 | 0.00 |
| (Greece) Panathinaikos | 2 | 0 | 2 | 0 | 0 | 0 | +0 | 0.00 |
| (Greece) PAOK | 2 | 0 | 2 | 0 | 3 | 3 | +0 | 0.00 |
| (Greece) Olympiacos | 2 | 0 | 0 | 2 | 0 | 2 | −2 | 0.00 |
| (Hungary) Zalaegerszegi | 2 | 2 | 0 | 0 | 5 | 0 | +5 | 100.00 |
| (Republic of Ireland) Shamrock Rovers | 2 | 2 | 0 | 0 | 7 | 1 | +6 | 100.00 |
| (Israel) Hapoel Tel Aviv | 2 | 1 | 1 | 0 | 3 | 0 | +3 | 50.00 |
| (Italy) Inter Milan | 4 | 1 | 2 | 1 | 6 | 5 | +1 | 25.00 |
| (Italy) Parma | 2 | 0 | 0 | 2 | 0 | 2 | −2 | 0.00 |
| (North Macedonia) Rabotnichki | 2 | 1 | 1 | 0 | 2 | 1 | +1 | 50.00 |
| (Netherlands) Twente | 2 | 0 | 1 | 1 | 2 | 4 | −2 | 0.00 |
| (Norway) Molde | 2 | 2 | 0 | 0 | 5 | 0 | +5 | 100.00 |
| (Poland) Raków Częstochowa | 2 | 0 | 1 | 1 | 0 | 1 | −1 | 0.00 |
| (Serbia) Jagodina | 2 | 2 | 0 | 0 | 4 | 2 | +2 | 100.00 |
| (Serbia) Partizan | 2 | 1 | 1 | 0 | 3 | 1 | +2 | 50.00 |
| (Slovenia) Maribor | 2 | 1 | 1 | 0 | 6 | 3 | +3 | 50.00 |
| (Spain) Atlético Madrid | 2 | 1 | 0 | 1 | 2 | 1 | +1 | 50.00 |
| (Spain) Barcelona | 4 | 1 | 2 | 1 | 3 | 4 | −1 | 25.00 |
| (Spain) Levante | 2 | 1 | 1 | 0 | 2 | 0 | +2 | 50.00 |
| (Spain) Real Betis | 2 | 0 | 1 | 1 | 1 | 3 | −2 | 0.00 |
| (Switzerland) Sion | 2 | 1 | 0 | 1 | 3 | 2 | +1 | 50.00 |
| (Ukraine) Dynamo Kyiv | 4 | 2 | 1 | 1 | 5 | 4 | +1 | 50.00 |
