= Valeri Chizhov =

Russian footballer

Personal information
- Full name: Valeri Nikolayevich Chizhov
- Date of birth: 14 April 1975 (age 51)
- Place of birth: Moscow, Russian SFSR
- Height: 1.85 m (6 ft 1 in)
- Position: Goalkeeper

Team information
- Current team: FC Shakhtyor Soligorsk (GK coach)

Youth career
- 1984–1991: FC Smena Moscow
- 1991: FC Spartak Moscow

Senior career*
Years	Team	Apps	(Gls)
1992–1996	FC Spartak Moscow	2	(0)
1992–1996	→ FC Spartak-d Moscow	151	(0)
1996–1997	FC Neftekhimik Nizhnekamsk	31	(0)
1998–2003	FC Saturn Ramenskoye	132	(0)
2004	FC Rubin Kazan	10	(0)
2005–2006	FC Saturn Ramenskoye	4	(0)
2007	FC Sibir Novosibirsk	19	(0)
2008	FC Vityaz Podolsk	12	(0)
2008	FC Dynamo Bryansk	11	(0)
2009–2010	FC Avangard Kursk	49	(0)
2011–2012	FC Saturn-2 Moscow Region	5	(0)
2013	FC Saturn Ramenskoye (amateur)		

International career
2003	Russia	1	(0)

Managerial career
- 2012–2013: FC Saturn Ramenskoye
- 2014: FC Saturn-2 Ramenskoye
- 2014–2015: FC Saturn Ramenskoye (GK coach)
- 2016: FC Lokomotiv Moscow (academy GK coach)
- 2016–2017: FC Arsenal Tula (GK coach)
- 2018–2020: FC Nizhny Novgorod (GK coach)
- 2020–2022: FC Chayka Peschanokopskoye (GK coach)
- 2022–: FC Shakhtyor Soligorsk (GK coach)
- * Club domestic league appearances and goals

Valeri Nikolayevich Chizhov (Russian: Валерий Николаевич Чижов; born 14 April 1975) is a Russian football coach and a former goalkeeper. He works as a goalkeeping coach with FC Shakhtyor Soligorsk in Belarus.

== Honours ==
- Russian Premier League winner: 1992, 1994.
- Top 33 players year-end list: 2002.
- Russian Second Division, Zone Center best goalkeeper: 2009.

== International career ==
Chizhov played his only game for Russia on 12 February 2003 in a friendly against Cyprus.
