= Carlos Castro (footballer, born 1978) =

Costa Rican footballer

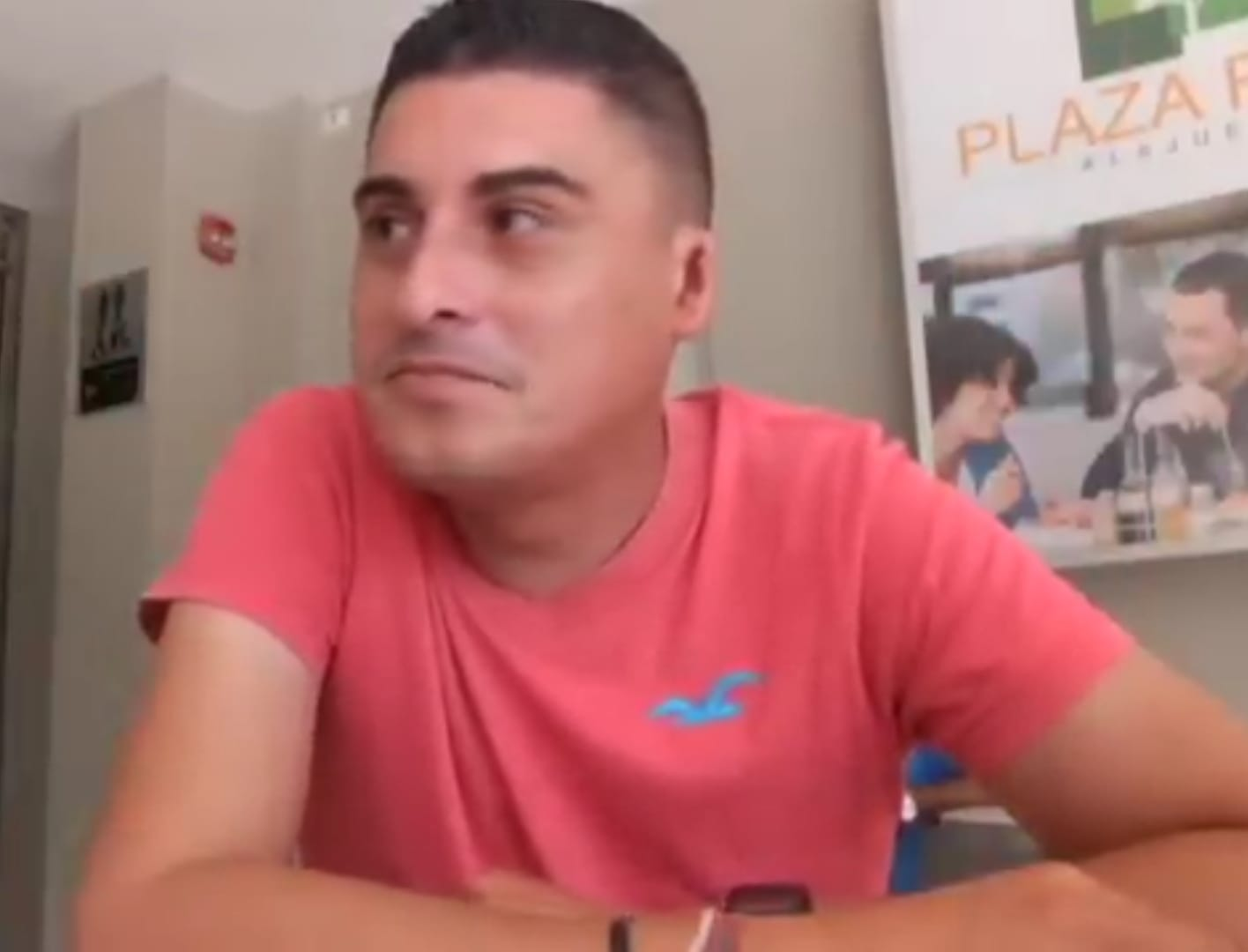

Personal information
- Full name: Carlos Eduardo Castro Mora
- Date of birth: September 10, 1978 (age 48)
- Place of birth: Alajuela, Costa Rica
- Height: 1.74 m (5 ft 8 1/2 in)
- Positions: Left back; left midfielder

Senior career*
Years	Team	Apps	(Gls)
1997–2003	Alajuelense	175	(4)
2003–2004	Rubin Kazan	9	(0)
2004–2006	Alajuelense	70	(0)
2007	Haugesund	26	(0)
2008–2010	Alajuelense	58	(0)
2010	Puntarenas	4	(0)
2011	Brujas	16	(0)
2011	Herediano	2	(0)
2012–2014	Carmelita	68	(0)

International career
2000–2007	Costa Rica	48	(1)
- * Club domestic league appearances and goals

Carlos Eduardo Castro Mora (born 10 September 1978) is a retired Costa Rican football player.

== Early life ==
Castro was raised by his grandparents.

== Club career ==
He made his professional debut on 19 October 1997 for Alajuelense against Puntarenas and also scored his first goal against Puntarenas on 15 November 1998, but was rumoured to be kicked off of the team for apparently drinking problems (which he denies). In 2003, he moved abroad to play for Rubin Kazan in Russia whom he left in May 2004 to return to Alajuelense. He has played as left back or left midfielder and dribbles and crosses well, he also has good passing skills.

In January 2007 he signed on a free deal for Norwegian first division club, FK Haugesund, but left the club in January 2008 due to the family did not want to stay in Norway. He decided to go back to Costa Rica after a good season in Norway, and signed for his beloved team, Alajuelense. As soon as he signed, he became a regular in the starting line-up. In June 2010 he left them for Puntarenas and he later played for Brujas.

In summer 2011 he had a very short stint at Herediano, joining them in June and leaving them already in August. In summer 2012, Castro was snapped up by Carmelita and on 1 May 2014 he announced his retirement.

== International career ==
Castro played at the 1995 FIFA U-17 World Championship and 1997 FIFA World Youth Championship.

He made his senior debut for the Ticos in a June 2000 friendly match against Paraguay and has earned a total of 48 caps, scoring 1 goal. He has represented his country in 12 FIFA World Cup qualification matches and played in Costa Rica's all three matches at the 2002 FIFA World Cup. He also played at the 2003 UNCAF Nations Cup as well as at the 2002 and 2003 CONCACAF Gold Cups and the 2001 Copa América.

His final international was an October 2007 friendly match against Haiti.

=== International goals ===
Scores and results list Costa Rica's goal tally first.

N.	Date	Venue	Opponent	Score	Result	Competition
1.	13 October 2007	Estadio Cuscatlán, San Salvador, El Salvador	El Salvador	2–0	2–2	Friendly match

== Honours ==
- Primera División de Costa Rica (5):
  - 1999-00, 2000–01, 2001–02, 2002–03, 2004–05
- Copa Interclubes UNCAF (2):
  - 2002, 2005
- CONCACAF Gold Cup Best XI: 2003
