= Miodrag Jovanović (footballer, born 1977) =

Serbian footballer

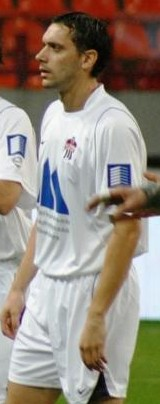

Personal information
- Date of birth: 24 March 1977 (age 49)
- Place of birth: Yugoslavia
- Height: 1.88 m (6 ft 2 in)
- Position: Defender

Senior career*
Years	Team	Apps	(Gls)
1995–1999	Radnički Niš		
1999–2000	Zvezdara		
2000	Spartak-Chukotka Moscow	8	(0)
2000	Chernomorets Novorossiysk	1	(0)
2000	→ Chernomorets Novorossiysk II	5	(1)
2001–2010	Khimki	224	(12)
- * Club domestic league appearances and goals

Miodrag Jovanović (Serbian: Миодраг Јовановић; born 24 March 1977) is a Serbian former footballer who played the biggest part of his career for Russian club FC Khimki. He holds the club record for most appearances for the club in all competitions (238).
