= Alejandro Domínguez (footballer, born 1981) =

Argentine association footballer and scout

Chori Domínguez
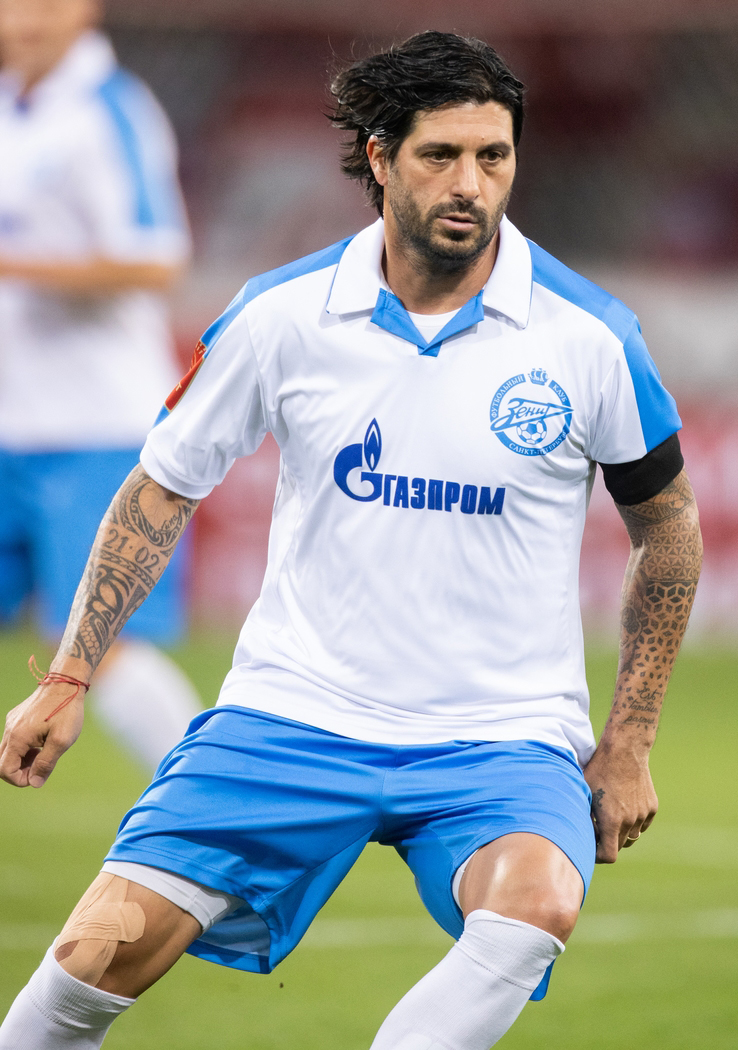
- Domínguez in 2022.

Personal information
- Full name: Alejandro Damián Domínguez
- Date of birth: 10 June 1981 (age 45)
- Place of birth: Quilmes, Argentina
- Height: 1.76 m (5 ft 9 1/2 in)
- Position: Attacking midfielder

Senior career*
Years	Team	Apps	(Gls)
2000–2001	Quilmes	25	(6)
2001–2004	River Plate	29	(9)
2004–2007	Rubin Kazan	63	(22)
2007–2009	Zenit St. Petersburg	46	(7)
2009–2010	Rubin Kazan	23	(16)
2010–2012	Valencia	22	(0)
2011–2012	→ River Plate (loan)	33	(5)
2012–2013	Rayo Vallecano	33	(5)
2013–2017	Olympiacos	82	(28)
2017–2018	Rayo Vallecano	19	(2)
Total		375	(100)

International career
2001	Argentina U20	3	(1)
Medal record
Representing Argentina
Men's football
FIFA U-20 World Cup
Winner	2001 Argentina
- * Club domestic league appearances and goals

Alejandro Damián Domínguez (born 10 June 1981), also known as Chori, is an Argentine former professional footballer who played as an attacking midfielder or a second striker. Emerged from Quilmes's youth academy, Domínguez had notable stints at River Plate, Zenit and Olympiacos.

== Career ==
=== Early career ===
After playing for second league club Quilmes, Domínguez, nicknamed 'Chorí' since he was a teenager, joined Argentine giants River Plate, winning the Clausura three consecutive times with the club.

=== Rubin Kazan ===
Scouted by several European clubs, he ended up signing for Russian side Rubin Kazan, in 2004. During 2006 pre-season Rubin tried to sell him, but they were not satisfied with the amount offered for him and decided to keep him.

=== Zenit Saint Petersburg ===
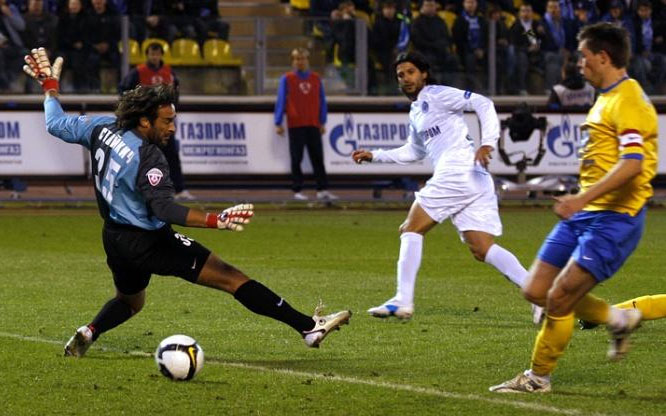
Domínguez scoring in Zenit's 8–1 win over Luch

Domínguez was signed by FC Zenit Saint Petersburg for €7 million before the start of 2007 Russian season, breaking the record transfer fee inside the Russian Premier League, however the record was exceeded in 2008, when Danny moved from FC Dynamo Moscow to Zenit Saint Petersburg for a fee well above 30 million euros. One of Domínguez's most notable performances was in the 4–0 UEFA Cup victory over Bayern Munich which sent Zenit to the final of the competition for the first time in the history of the club. Domínguez played exceptionally well and provided 2 assists. Dominguez played an extraordinary role in winning Zenit's first domestic championship title in 2007. The Gazprom-sponsored side needed a win at now-defunct Saturn in order to finish top and had to defend a last-minute corner when leading 1–0. As the Zenit Saint Petersburg defence froze, Baffour Gyan's header seemed to be making its way into the net, only for Chori—one of the shortest players on the pitch at 5-foot-7 – to miraculously jump on the line and head it onto the crossbar.

=== Back to Rubin Kazan ===
On 13 March 2009, Rubin Kazan signed 'Chori' back from Zenit, where he had some problems with the coach Dick Advocaat.

In the 2009–10 UEFA Champions League, Domínguez played well for Rubin, providing the team with goals against Inter Milan and FC Dynamo Kyiv. He also made an assist to Gökdeniz Karadeniz who scored a stunning match-winning goal against FC Barcelona during the group stage. Rubin Kazan failed to advance to the first knockout round due to a 2–0 loss against Internazionale.

He was named the best footballer in Russia of 2009 by the Russian Football Union, Sport Express newspaper and Russian weekly magazine Futbol.

=== Valencia ===
On 11 December 2009, it was announced that Domínguez would join Valencia. He signed a three-and-a-half-year contract on 14 December 2009. Dominguez was behind Roberto Soldado and Aritz Aduriz in the selection.

At the middle of the 2010–11 season, Sky Sport Italia and Tuttosport claimed that Juventus had reached an agreement for a loan with the option to make it a permanent move in the summer. There were doubts as to whether the deal would go through as voices suggested the striker lacked an EU passport, meaning Juventus would not be able to sign him. However, it was revealed he had an Italian passport, making him eligible to join Juve as he would not affect their non-EU quotas.

=== Return to River Plate ===
In the middle of 2011, the player contacted his employers at Valencia to negotiate a loan to former club River Plate, which had been relegated for the first time in its history to the second division of Argentina. His gesture was highly appreciated by the fans, and Domínguez featured as one of the team's stars in both attacking midfielder and forward roles for the club, scoring 5 goals, providing numerous assists and functioning as vice-captain.

=== Rayo Vallecano ===
In late June 2012, after he had achieved a return to the first division with River Plate, Domínguez was told he would not continue to play for River, as the club decided not to negotiate his transfer from Valencia. He left alongside top scorer and former captain Fernando Cavenaghi, both stating irreconcilable differences with club president, Daniel Passarella. He didn't stay in Valencia and was contracted at the beginning of August 2012 by Spanish Primera división club Rayo Vallecano, on a one-year deal. After signing the contract, he confessed the project they presented him was attractive, but he also chose the club because of the red stripe on the white home shirt, which reminded him of his home team River Plate's kit.

=== Olympiacos ===
The 32-year-old Argentine was widely expected to remain in Spain following his 12-month spell at the Campo de Futbol de Vallecas, but instead opted to join former Getafe and Sevilla boss Michel at the Karaiskakis Stadium.

In July 2013, Domínguez signed a two-year contract with Greek side Olympiakos. On 1 December 2013, he scored his first goal with the club in the Super League in a 3–0 home win against Ergotelis. On 26 February 2014 after he had scored one goal against Manchester United in the first leg of their last-16 Champions League tie, he told UEFA's official site that : "I am so happy. I am very satisfied with the team's work and the victory we achieved. I believe we have made a big step – a giant leap forward".

On 13 September 2014 Domínguez impressed again scoring a spectacular goal in a 3–0 home win against OFI. He also impressed in Olympiacos' 3–2 home win against Atletico Madrid. He was subsequently named in the Champions League "Team of the Week". On 9 December 2014, Dominguez impressed again by scoring an amazing goal in a 4–2 home win against Malmö for UEFA Champions League.

On 2 April 2015, the Argentine attacking midfielder had been an indispensable member of Olympiakos squad for yet another season pledged his future to the club by signing a new contract until 2017. Despite the offers from his homeland Dominguez decided to stay at Olympiakos as he was very happy with his life in Greece. "I'm glad that I signed a new deal. I'm very happy with that. My family is also happy here in Greece. That's why I decided to renew my contract. There were offers from Argentina but Olympiakos wanted me to stay here as well. I feel great playing at such a great club which competes for titles every season. I like living under pressure", Dominguez underlined. In the 2014–15 the club won the league and he scored 15 goals (3rd highest in the league) and provided 11 assists (highest in the league).

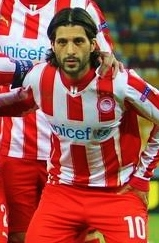
Domínguez playing for Olympiacos in 2015.

On 23 May 2015, Alejandro Domínguez scored as Olympiacos celebrated their 27th Greek Cup triumph thanks to a 3–1 victory against Skoda Xanthi at the Olympic Stadium. Receiving the ball inside his own half, Domínguez escaped two challenges, drove towards the area and unleashed a stunning curling effort.

On 12 September 2015, Dominguez scored his first goal for the 2015–16 season in a home 3–1 win against Platanias. He had a long shot hit the post in the 44th but did not miss in the 52nd when he took a back heel pass from Brown Ideye inside the area, dribbled past a defender, and shot low just inside the right post. On 13 December 2015, Dominguez helped his club, by scoring the only goal, to reach the 14th victory in a row for Super League Greece setting a new club record, by winning Panetolikos. On 3 January 2016, he scored the first goal helping his club to escape with a 3–1 away win against Panionios. On 18 February 2016, in the 1st leg UEFA Europa League game for the round of 32 against RSC Anderlecht, Argentine midfielder Dominguez reached 100 matches with Olympiakos' jersey.

On 25 August 2016, in a crucial second leg match for Europa League playoffs, he entered in the last minute of the game, and by scoring the first goal in extra time helped his club to escape with a 2–1 home win (3–1 on aggregate) against Portuguese club Arouca. As of mid November 2016, Olympiacos manager Paulo Bento did not include Dominguez in his first team plans. However, the Argentine maestro was always very enthusiastic and professional in training and is ready to see out his contract at Olympiakos as a move in January is not among his options. Dominguez's positive influence in the club's offensive efficacy, even as a late-game substitute, was proven on various occasions, such as the home game against Panetolikos on 18 December 2016, where he greatly helped Olympiakos mount a comeback from 0–1 behind to eventually win the game 3–1. In April 2017, with the arrival of the new coach Takis Lemonis, gradually returned to the starting squad and he finished the season with an away goal in a 2–0 win against Panetolikos, helping his club to win the fourth consecutive Super League title.

=== Return to Rayo ===
On 7 August 2017, Rayo Vallecano confirmed the return of Domínguez to the club.

== Retirement ==
On 28 June 2019, Alejandro Dominguez, has announced his retirement from football at the age of 38.

== Career statistics ==
As of match played 12 July 2018

Club	Season	League			Cup		Continental		Total	
Club	Season	Division	Apps	Goals	Apps	Goals	Apps	Goals	Apps	Goals
Quilmes	2000–01	Argentine Primera División	25	6	0	0	0	0	25	6
River Plate	2000–01	Argentine Primera División	2	2	0	0	0	0	2	2
River Plate	2001–02	Argentine Primera División	15	5	0	0	0	0	15	5
River Plate	2002–03	Argentine Primera División	12	2	0	0	0	0	12	2
River Plate	Total		29	9	0	0	0	0	29	9
Rubin Kazan	2004	Russian Premier League	18	2	3	0	1	0	22	2
Rubin Kazan	2005	Russian Premier League	22	6	2	0	0	0	24	6
Rubin Kazan	2006	Russian Premier League	23	13	4	2	3	2	30	17
Rubin Kazan	Total		63	21	9	2	4	2	76	25
Zenit St. Petersburg	2007	Russian Premier League	24	3	4	3	7	0	35	6
Zenit St. Petersburg	2008	Russian Premier League	22	4	1	0	5	0	28	4
Zenit St. Petersburg	Total		46	7	5	3	12	0	63	10
Rubin Kazan	2009	Russian Premier League	23	16	2	0	6	2	31	18
Valencia	2009–10	La Liga	13	0	1	0	0	0	14	0
Valencia	2010–11	La Liga	9	0	1	0	6	1	16	1
Valencia	Total		22	0	2	0	6	1	30	1
River Plate	2011–12	Primera B Nacional	33	5	1	1	0	0	34	6
Rayo Vallecano	2012–13	La Liga	33	5	0	0	0	0	33	5
Olympiacos	2013–14	Super League Greece	23	5	7	3	8	3	38	11
Olympiacos	2014–15	Super League Greece	30	15	5	1	8	2	43	18
Olympiacos	2015–16	Super League Greece	18	5	4	2	5	0	27	7
Olympiacos	2016–17	Super League Greece	11	3	2	0	5	1	18	4
Olympiacos	Total		82	28	18	6	26	6	126	40
Rayo Vallecano	2017–18	Segunda División	19	2	1	0	0	0	20	2
Career total			375	99	38	12	54	11	467	122

== Honours ==
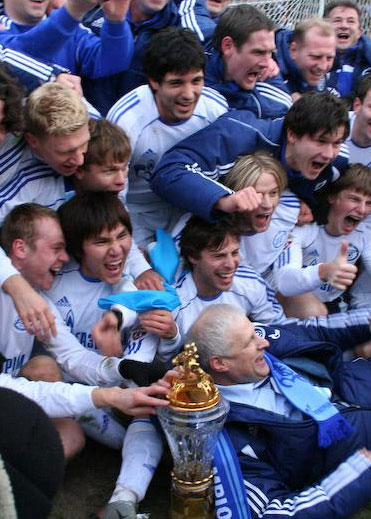
Domínguez (standing in the centre) alongside his Zenit teammates delighted to win Premier League trophy

River Plate

- Argentine Primera División: 2002 Clausura, 2003 Clausura, 2004 Clausura
- Primera B Nacional: 2011–12

Zenit Saint Petersburg

- Russian Premier League: 2007
- Russian Super Cup: 2008
- UEFA Cup: 2007–08
- UEFA Super Cup: 2008

Rubin Kazan

- Russian Premier League: 2009

Olympiacos

- Super League Greece: 2013–14, 2014–15, 2015–16, 2016–17
- Greek Cup: 2014–15

Rayo Vallecano

- Segunda División: 2017–18

Argentina U20

- FIFA World Youth Championship: 2001

Individual

- Sport-Express Top Foreign Player in Russian Premier League: 2006
- Russian Football Union Russian Footballer of the Year: 2009
- Russian Premier League Team of the Season: 2007, 2009
- Futbol Footballer of the Year in Russia: 2009
- Sport Express Footballer of the Year in Russia: 2009
- Super League Greece Top assist provider: 2013–14, 2014–15
- Super League Greece Player of the Season: 2014–15
- Super League Greece Best Foreign Player: 2014–15
- Super League Greece Team of the Season: 2013–14, 2014–15
- Olympiacos Goal of the Season: 2013–14, 2014–15
