= Denis Boyarintsev =

Russian footballer

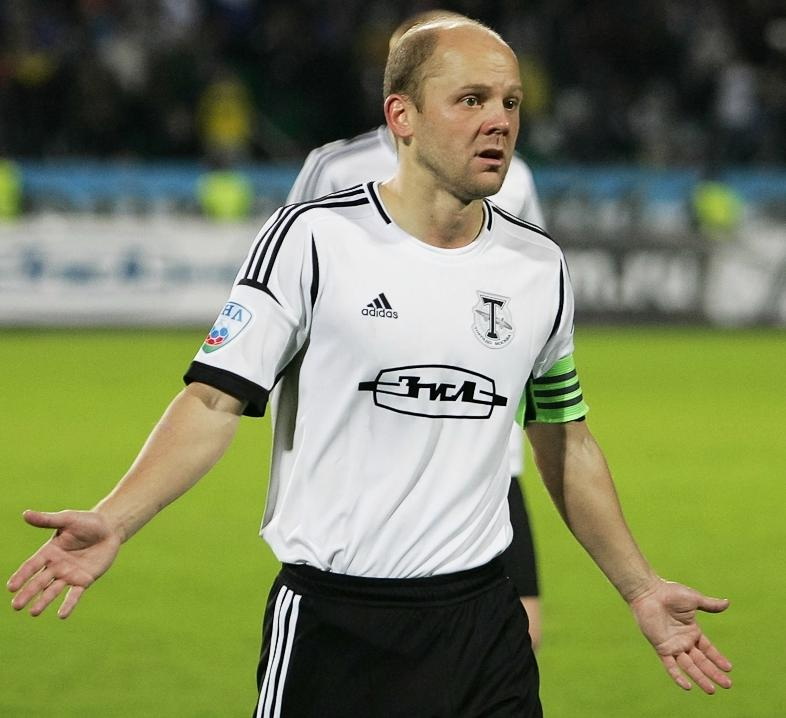
- Boyarintsev with Torpedo Moscow in 2012

Personal information
- Full name: Denis Konstantinovich Boyarintsev
- Date of birth: 6 February 1978 (age 48)
- Place of birth: Moscow, Russian SFSR
- Height: 1.77 m (5 ft 10 in)
- Position: Winger

Team information
- Current team: Shinnik Yaroslavl (manager)

Senior career*
Years	Team	Apps	(Gls)
1995–1996	Smena Moscow	71	(4)
1997	MEPhI Moscow	35	(3)
1998–2000	Nosta Novotroitsk	96	(14)
2001–2004	Rubin Kazan	108	(22)
2005–2007	Spartak Moscow	73	(9)
2008	Shinnik	27	(6)
2009	Spartak Moscow	19	(0)
2010	Saturn Moscow Oblast	16	(1)
2011	Zhemchuzhina Sochi	18	(2)
2011–2012	Tom Tomsk	23	(2)
2012–2014	Torpedo Moscow	51	(3)

International career
2004	Russia	6	(0)

Managerial career
- 2014–2016: Torpedo Moscow (reserves)
- 2016–2017: Nosta Novotroitsk (assistant)
- 2017–2019: Tekstilshchik Ivanovo
- 2020: KAMAZ Naberezhnye Chelny (assistant)
- 2021–2022: Rodina Moscow
- 2022–2023: Novosibirsk
- 2023: Sokol Saratov
- 2024–2025: Rotor Volgograd
- 2026–: Shinnik Yaroslavl
- * Club domestic league appearances and goals

Denis Konstantinovich Boyarintsev (Russian: Дени́с Константи́нович Боя́ринцев, born 6 February 1978) is a Russian football coach and a former player who played as a winger. He is the manager of Shinnik Yaroslavl. He was known for his ball control abilities and his hard work.

== Playing career ==
In January 2010 Saturn Ramenskoye signed the winger from Spartak Moscow.

=== Career stats ===
Year	Club	Games	Goals
1995	Smena (Moscow)	34	1
1996	Smena (Moscow)	37	3
1997	FC MEPhI Moscow (Moscow)	35	3
1998	Nosta (Novotroitsk)	32	6
1999	Nosta (Novotroitsk)	28	5
2000	Nosta (Novotroitsk)	36	3
2001	Rubin (Kazan)	29	6
2002	Rubin (Kazan)	27	5
2003	Rubin (Kazan)	28	7
2004	Rubin (Kazan)	24	4
2005	Spartak Moscow	27	4
2006	Spartak Moscow	22	2
2007	Spartak Moscow	24	3
2008	Shinnik Yaroslavl	27	6
2009	Spartak Moscow	19	0

== International career ==
Boyarintsev has also played for the Russian national team.

=== Russian national football team ===
Year	Games	Goals
2004	5	0
2005	1	0

== Coaching career ==
Under his management, Tekstilshchik Ivanovo advanced to the second-tier Russian Football National League at the end of the 2018–19 season. However, the club suffered poor results in the FNL and Boyarintsev was fired on 18 December 2019.

On 30 May 2022, Rodina Moscow which he managed secured promotion to FNL.

On 28 May 2023, Boyarintsev secured promotion to the Russian First League with Sokol Saratov.

On 16 June 2024, Boyarintsev secured another promotion to the Russian First League for the fourth time in his career, this time with Rotor Volgograd. He left Rotor on 24 November 2025.

== Honours ==
=== Individual ===
- Russian Professional Football League Zone West best coach (2018–19).
