= Andrei Kolesnikov (footballer) =

Russian footballer

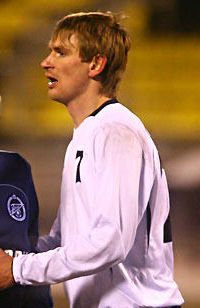
- Andrei Aleksandrovich Kolesnikov

Personal information
- Full name: Andrei Aleksandrovich Kolesnikov
- Date of birth: 11 February 1984 (age 42)
- Place of birth: Valuyki, Russian SFSR
- Height: 1.83 m (6 ft 0 in)
- Position: Defender

Youth career
- –2001: FC Dynamo Moscow

Senior career*
Years	Team	Apps	(Gls)
2002	FC Dynamo Moscow	0	(0)
2003–2004	FC Rubin Kazan	0	(0)
2004	→ FC Neftekhimik Nizhnekamsk (loan)	20	(1)
2005	FC Ural Sverdlovsk Oblast	14	(0)
2006–2007	FC Torpedo Moscow	12	(0)
2008	FC Tom Tomsk	0	(0)
2009	FC MVD Rossii Moscow	16	(1)
2009–2010	FC Luch-Energiya Vladivostok	40	(0)
2011	FC Fakel Voronezh	10	(0)
2011–2012	FC Chernomorets Novorossiysk	18	(0)
2012–2013	FC Fakel Voronezh	11	(1)
2013	FC Salyut Belgorod	1	(0)
2015–2018	FC Energomash Belgorod	61	(3)
2018–2020	FC Salyut Belgorod	35	(1)

International career
2003	Russia U-19	5	(0)
2006	Russia U-21	4	(0)
- * Club domestic league appearances and goals

Andrei Aleksandrovich Kolesnikov (Russian: Андрей Александрович Колесников; born 11 February 1984) is a Russian former footballer.

== Club career ==
He made his Russian Premier League debut for FC Torpedo Moscow on 22 April 2006 in a game against FC Luch-Energiya Vladivostok.
