= Ivan Zavaliy =

Russian footballer

Personal information
- Full name: Ivan Viktorovich Zavaliy
- Date of birth: 18 September 1984 (age 42)
- Height: 1.80 m (5 ft 11 in)
- Position: Forward

Senior career*
Years	Team	Apps	(Gls)
2002	FC Ratmir Tver		
2003	FC SKA Rostov-on-Don	30	(13)
2004	FC Rubin Kazan	1	(0)
2004	FC SKA-Energia Khabarovsk	0	(0)
2005–2006	FC Tom Tomsk	2	(0)
2006	FC Sodovik Sterlitamak	14	(1)
2007	FC KAMAZ Naberezhnye Chelny	5	(0)
2007	FC Zvezda Irkutsk	13	(4)
2008–2012	FC Baltika Kaliningrad	112	(21)
2012	FC Biolog-Novokubansk Progress	17	(6)
- * Club domestic league appearances and goals

Ivan Viktorovich Zavaliy (Russian: Иван Викторович Завалий; born 18 September 1984) is a Russian former professional footballer.

== Club career ==
He made his debut in the Russian Premier League in 2004 for FC Rubin Kazan.
