= Cédric Roussel =

Belgian footballer (1978–2023)

- Roussel after signing with Wolverhampton in 2001

Personal information
- Date of birth: 6 January 1978
- Place of birth: Mons, Belgium
- Date of death: 24 June 2023 (aged 45)
- Place of death: Mons, Belgium
- Height: 1.90 m (6 ft 3 in)
- Position: Forward

Senior career*
Years	Team	Apps	(Gls)
1994–1998	La Louvière	107	(49)
1998–2000	Gent	32	(8)
1999–2000	→ Coventry City (loan)	10	(2)
2000–2001	Coventry City	28	(6)
2001–2003	Wolverhampton Wanderers	25	(2)
2002–2003	→ Mons (loan)	33	(22)
2003–2004	Genk	31	(14)
2004	Rubin Kazan	6	(1)
2004–2006	Standard Liège	15	(6)
2006	Zulte Waregem	14	(4)
2007	Brescia	3	(0)
2007–2010	Mons	43	(12)
2010	AEK Larnaca	0	(0)
2010	La Louvière	0	(0)
2010–2011	HSV Hoek	0	(0)
2011	RUS Beloeil		
2012–2013	CS Entité Manageoise		
2013	R.R.C Waterloo		

International career
1993–1994	Belgium U16	4	(3)
1995–1996	Belgium U18	7	(5)
1995	Belgium U19	5	(0)
1997–1999	Belgium U21	12	(10)
2003	Belgium	3	(0)
- * Club domestic league appearances and goals

Cédric Roussel (6 January 1978 – 24 June 2023) was a Belgian professional footballer who played as a forward.

Roussel started his professional football career in 1997 with Gent and later joined Premier League club Coventry City in 1999. Despite initial success, he struggled with injuries and was eventually sold to Wolverhampton Wanderers. He played for various clubs, including Mons, Genk, Rubin Kazan, Standard Liège, Zulte Waregem, Brescia, and HSV Hoek, before retiring in 2015. Roussel made his first appearance for the Belgium national team in 2003. After retiring, he started a career in real estate.

== Career ==
=== Early career ===
In 1997, Roussel took part in the FIFA World Youth Championship. In the season that followed the tournament, he was promoted to the Gent senior team.

=== Coventry City ===
Roussel signed a season-long loan deal for Premier League club Coventry City on 12 October 1999. He made his debut on 16 October, during the 4–1 win over Newcastle United, coming on as a late substitute for Gary McAllister. On 22 November 1999 he scored his first goal for the club, a header against Aston Villa at Highfield Road. Having impressed during his initial loan spell, Coventry signed Roussel in January 2000 for a fee of £1.2 million, despite "substantial" bids from Leeds United and Tottenham Hotspur. He finished his first season in the Premier League with six goals, including two goals in the 3–2 defeat to Manchester United in February 2000. Roussel also formed a successful strike partnership with young Irishman Robbie Keane. However, the following season he began to struggle on the goalscoring front, owing partly to injury setbacks.

Midway through January 2001, with Coventry struggling in the league, a number of bids were made for Roussel's services, including one from Wimbledon. After refusing to sign for Wimbledon, he criticized the Coventry board for trying to use him as a makeweight in a deal to bring John Hartson to the club. He was particularly critical of the club's chairman Bryan Richardson for forcing through the Wimbledon transfer, accusing him of not repaying the loyalty Roussel himself had shown in signing permanently for the club, despite interest from "several classier clubs." Roussel would however later describe his time at Coventry as "the best part of my career."

=== Wolverhampton Wanderers ===
Roussel was eventually sold a few weeks later to the First Division club Wolverhampton Wanderers, for a fee of "about £2m". Generally disappointing at Molineux, he left after 18 months, having scored two goals in twenty five appearances. He was loaned out for the 2002–03 season to his hometown club Mons, who had recently been promoted to the Belgian Pro League. He finished the season as the division's joint top scorer with Wesley Sonck; both players scored 22 goals.

=== Genk and Rubin Kazan ===
His goalscoring form attracted interest from bigger clubs in the league and Roussel signed for Genk in 2003. His reputation in Belgian football increased and he made his first appearance for the Belgium national team in 2003. After just one season at Genk, in which he scored on thirteen occasions, he moved on again, this time signing for Rubin Kazan in Russia.

=== Standard Liège, Zulte Waregem and Brescia ===
Roussel never felt at home in Russia and returned to Belgium to play for Standard Liège. At Standard he struggled to break into the first team and after two unsuccessful years at the club he signed for Zulte Waregem. His time there was again short-lived and a year later he signed for Italian Serie B club Brescia. Roussel soon found himself frozen out at Brescia, and the club became open to offers for him.

In August 2007, he spent a week on trial with Scottish Premier League club Dundee United but returned home without signing the agreed loan deal.

=== Return to Mons ===
Roussel instead chose to return to his former club Mons, where he signed a three-year contract.

=== In the lower leagues ===
On 25 November 2010, Roussel agreed with Dutch side HSV Hoek to play in the Topklasse. In August 2011 he moved to RUS Beloeil in Belgium.

On 13 February 2015, Roussel announced his retirement from football at the age of 37.

== Honours ==
Individual

- Belgian Pro League top scorer: 2002–03 (22 goals)

== Outside football ==
Roussel had a son (born 2001) with former girlfriend Kirsty Wood.

Following his retirement from football, Roussel began a career in real estate.

Roussel died from a cardiac arrest on 24 June 2023, at the age of 45. It was reported that Roussel had collapsed on a terrace in Mons, and paramedics were unable to revive him.
