= Andrei Konovalov =

Russian footballer

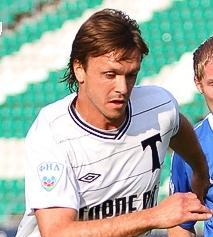

Personal information
- Full name: Andrei Stepanovich Konovalov
- Date of birth: 13 September 1974 (age 52)
- Place of birth: Chelyabinsk, Russia, Soviet Union
- Height: 1.78 m (5 ft 10 in)
- Position: Midfielder

Team information
- Current team: FC Veles Moscow (assistant coach)

Youth career
- FC Zenit Chelyabinsk

Senior career*
Years	Team	Apps	(Gls)
1991	FC Zenit Chelyabinsk	11	(6)
1991–1995	FC Spartak Moscow	15	(2)
1996	FC Energia-Tekstilshchik Kamyshin	12	(1)
1996–1997	FC Spartak Moscow	22	(1)
1998–1999	FC Sokol Saratov	40	(1)
1999–2001	FC Krylia Sovetov Samara	60	(4)
2002–2005	FC Rubin Kazan	85	(7)
2006–2007	FC Shinnik Yaroslavl	40	(3)
2008–2009	FC SKA-Energiya Khabarovsk	52	(3)
2010–2011	FC Torpedo Moscow	44	(4)
2011–2012	FC Arsenal Tula (amateur)		
2012	FC Sparta Shchyolkovo		

International career
1993–1995	Russia U21	5	(0)

Managerial career
- 2013–2017: FC Spartak-2 Moscow (assistant)
- 2017–2018: Russia U21 (assistant)
- 2020: FC Krasny (assistant)
- 2021–2022: FC Spartak-2 Moscow (assistant)
- 2023–: FC Veles Moscow (assistant)
- * Club domestic league appearances and goals

Andrei Stepanovich Konovalov (Russian: Андрей Степанович Коновалов; born 13 September 1974) is a Russian professional football coach and a former player. He is an assistant coach with FC Veles Moscow.

== Club career ==
He made his debut in the Russian Premier League in 1993 for FC Spartak Moscow.
