= FC Servis-Kholod-Smena Moscow =

- Full name: Football Club Servis-Kholod-Smena Moscow
- Founded: 1994
- Dissolved: 2001
- League: Amateur Football League, Zone Center, Moscow
- 2000: 12th

FC Servis-Kholod-Smena Moscow (Russian: «Сервис‑Холод‑Смена» (Москва)) was a Russian football team from Moscow. It played professionally in 1995 and 1996. Their best result was 19th place in the Zone 3 of the Russian Third League in 1996.

== Team name history ==
- 1994 FC Smena-Ronika Moscow
- 1995–1996 FC Smena Moscow
- 1997 FC Smena-Servis Kholod Moscow
- 1998 FC Serkhol-Smena Moscow
- 1999 FC Servis-Kholod Moscow
- 2000 FC Servis-Kholod-Smena Moscow
