= Richard Dostálek =

Czech footballer (born 1974)

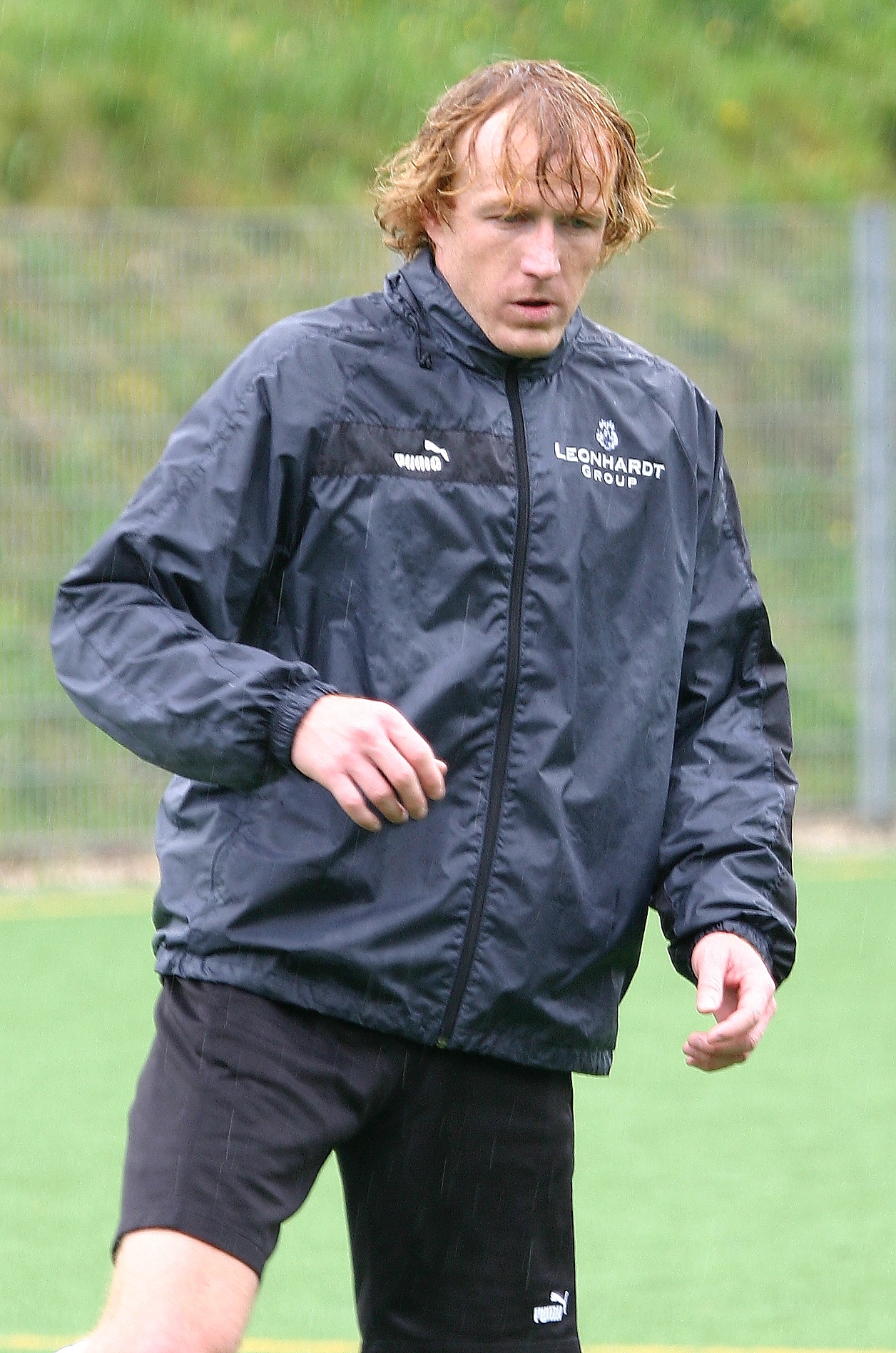
- Dostálek with Erzgebirge Aue

Personal information
- Date of birth: 26 April 1974 (age 52)
- Place of birth: Uherské Hradiště, Czechoslovakia
- Height: 1.92 m (6 ft 4 in)
- Position: Midfielder

Youth career
- 1980–1984: Slavoj Jarošov
- 1984–1992: Slovácká Slavia Uherské Hradiště
- 1992–1993: VTJ Kroměříž

Senior career*
Years	Team	Apps	(Gls)
1993–1998	1. FC Brno	121	(30)
1998–2003	Slavia Prague	153	(25)
2004	Rubin Kazan	24	(3)
2005	FC Slovácko	10	(1)
2005–2007	Erzgebirge Aue	52	(4)
2007–2008	Sportfreunde Siegen	0	(0)
2008–2009	FC Tescoma Zlín	13	(1)
2009–2011	FC Zbrojovka Brno	53	(10)
Total		426	(74)

International career
1994–1996	Czech Republic U21	8	(1)
1996–2003	Czech Republic	5	(0)

Managerial career
- 2012: Líšeň (assistant)
- 2012–2013: Vyškov (assistant)
- 2013–2016: Zbrojovka Brno (youth)
- 2014–2017: Zbrojovka Brno (assistant)
- 2017: Zbrojovka Brno
- 2019–2020: Zbrojovka Brno (assistant)
- 2020–2023: Zbrojovka Brno
- 2024–2025: Vyškov (assistant)
- 2025: Slovácko (assistant)
- * Club domestic league appearances and goals

Richard Dostálek (born 26 April 1974) is a Czech professional football coach and a former player who played as a midfielder. He is the manager of Zbrojovka Brno. He spent most of his Czech First League career at 1. FC Brno. In 1994, he won the Talent of the Year award at the Czech Footballer of the Year awards.

== Personal life ==
Dostalek is married and had two children.

== Honours ==
=== Managerial ===
FC Zbrojovka Brno

- Czech National Football League: 2021–22
