= Ebrima Ebou Sillah =

Gambian footballer (born 1980)

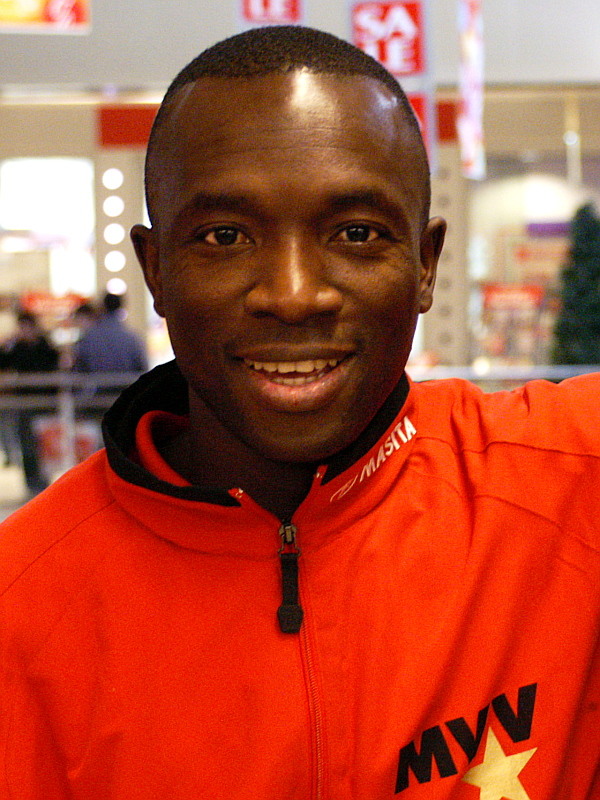

Personal information
- Full name: Ebrima Ebou Sillah
- Date of birth: 12 April 1980 (age 46)
- Place of birth: Bakau, Gambia
- Height: 1.73 m (5 ft 8 in)
- Positions: Winger; striker

Youth career
- Real de Banjul

Senior career*
Years	Team	Apps	(Gls)
1996	Real de Banjul		
1996–1997	Daring Blankenberge		
1997–2003	Club Brugge	41	(5)
2000	→ Harelbeke (loan)	23	(4)
2002–2003	→ RBC Roosendaal (loan)	15	(2)
2003–2006	Rubin Kazan	46	(4)
2006	RBC Roosendaal	20	(7)
2006–2008	Brussels	14	(1)
2007	→ Hapoel Petah Tikva (loan)	11	(0)
2007–2008	→ MVV (loan)	27	(5)
2008–2010	MVV	34	(5)
2010–2012	Spouwen-Mopertingen	?	(?)
2012–2014	Sporting Hasselt	28	(13)

International career
1996–2008	Gambia	23	(3)
- * Club domestic league appearances and goals

Ebrima Ebou Sillah (born 12 April 1980) is a Gambian former professional footballer who played as a winger or striker.

== Club career ==
Ebou Sillah was born in Bakau. He played for Real Banjul, Blankenberge, Club Brugge, Harelbeke, RBC Roosendaal, Rubin Kazan, FC Brussels, Hapoel Petah Tikva and MVV.

== Personal life ==
He also holds a Belgian passport.

== Honours ==
Club Brugge

- Belgian Cup: 2001–02
- Belgian Super Cup: 2002
