= Adam Petrouš =

Czech footballer (born 1977)

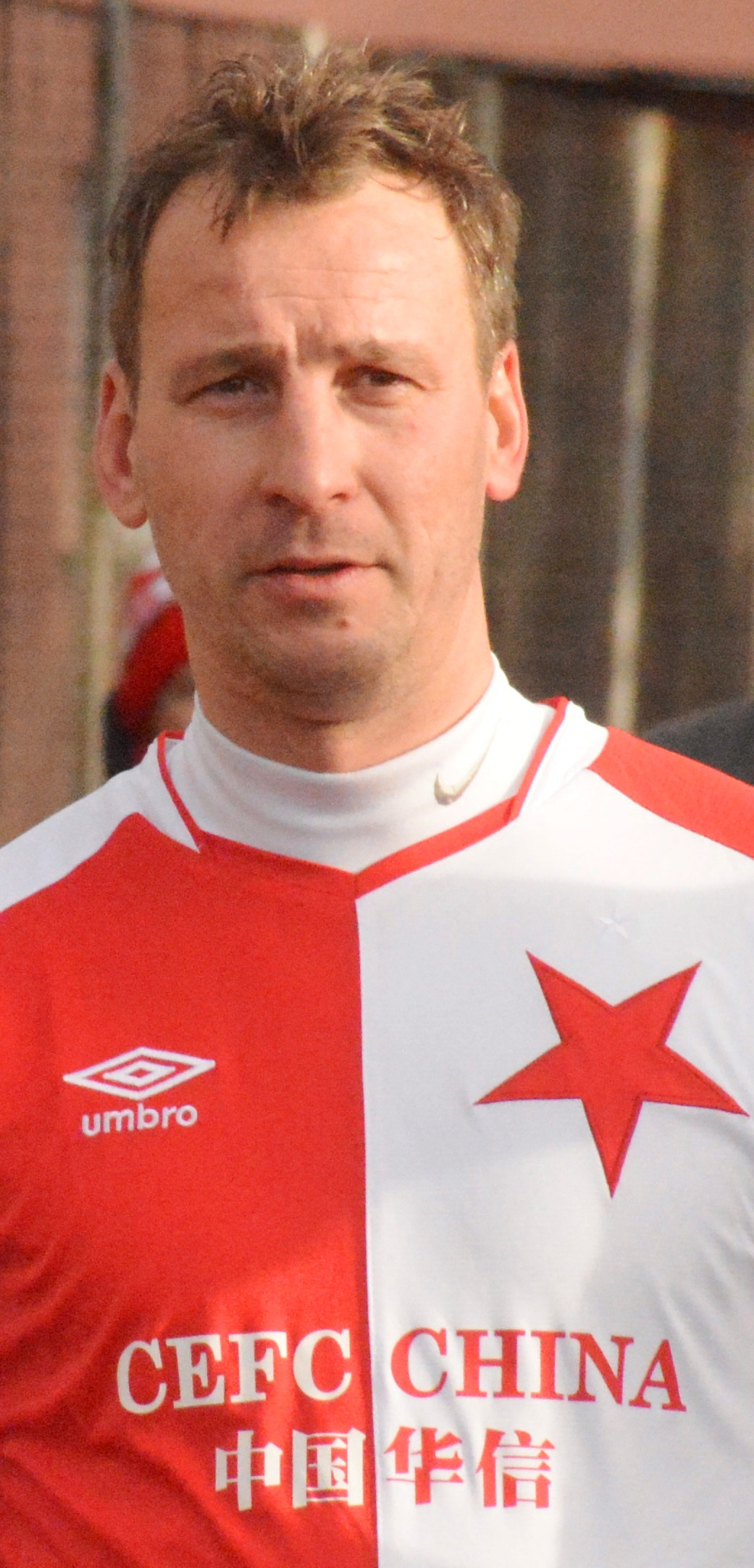

Personal information
- Date of birth: 19 September 1977 (age 49)
- Place of birth: Prague, Czechoslovakia
- Height: 1.86 m (6 ft 1 in)
- Position: Defender

Youth career
- 1987–1996: Slavia Prague

Senior career*
Years	Team	Apps	(Gls)
1996–2003	Slavia Prague	152	(10)
1996–1997	→ Bohemians Prague (loan)	20	(1)
2004–2005	Rubin Kazan	21	(0)
2005	→ Austria Wien (loan)	9	(1)
2005–2006	Sparta Prague	13	(0)
2006–2007	Ankaraspor	37	(4)
2007–2008	Slovan Liberec	13	(0)
2008	→ Erzgebirge Aue (loan)	10	(2)
2008–2009	Admira Wacker Mödling	1	(0)
2009	Viktoria Žižkov	0	(0)

International career
1998–2000	Czech Republic U21	24	(1)
2002–2003	Czech Republic	4	(0)
- * Club domestic league appearances and goals

Adam Petrouš (born 19 September 1977 in Prague, Czechoslovakia) is a Czech former professional football player. He won four caps for the Czech Republic national football team.
