= FC Alania Vladikavkaz (2019) =

Russian football club

Alania Vladikavkaz
- Full name: Football Club Alania Vladikavkaz
- Nicknames: Krasno-zholtyye (Red-Yellows); Barsi (Leopards)
- Founded: 1921; 105 years ago
- Ground: Sultan Bilimkhanov Stadium, Grozny (while Republican Spartak Stadium is under reconstruction)
- Capacity: 10,250
- Owner: Daniil Guriyev
- General director: Ruslan Siukayev
- Manager: Dmitry Fomin
- League: Russian Second League; Division A Gold Group
- 2025–26: Second stage: Silver Group, 3rd
- Website: fcalania.com
Home colours	Away colours	Third colours

FC Alania Vladikavkaz (Russian: Футбольный клуб «Алания» (Владикавказ), Iron Ossetic: Футболон клуб «Алани» (Дзæуджыхъæу)) is a Russian football team from Vladikavkaz. Founded in 1921, the club played in the Soviet Top League during the communist era, and won its first and only league title in the 1995 Russian Top League.

== History ==
Since the Russian football league system was established in 1992, the main team representing Vladikavkaz changed ownership structure several times, also changing the team name from FC Spartak Vladikavkaz to FC Spartak-Alania and FC Alania and back to Spartak. In the 2018–19 Russian Professional Football League season, the team was financed by the provincial government and played as Spartak. Before the 2019–20 season, a new team, privately owned and called FC Alania was organized and licensed for PFL. However, FC Spartak also remained in the league for 2019–20, even though many players and coaches moved to the "new Alania".

As a result of the COVID-19 pandemic in Russia, 2019–20 Russian Football National League season was abandoned and none of the teams were relegated. After the licensing, the league had 23 teams eligible for the 2020–21 season. Having an odd number of teams would mean one team would get a bye on each matchday and the league preferred to have an even number of teams, therefore it invited PFL teams to apply for the license. Out of the teams that applied, on 24 July 2020 Alania was selected by the Russian Football Union for promotion to FNL. On 15 May 2021, they secured a 4th place in the FNL which would normally qualify the club for Russian Premier League promotion playoffs. Alania failed to receive a Premier League license due to unacceptable condition of their stadium and therefore the playoffs were cancelled. In the 2022–23 Russian First League season, Alania secured 3rd position, again qualifying for the promotion play-offs, only to fail RPL licensing once again due to still-not-reconstructed stadium.

At the end of the 2024–25 Russian First League season, Alania has been relegated to the third-tier Russian Second League Division A.

=== Domestic ===
==== Soviet Union ====
Season	Div.	Pos.	Pl.	W	D	L	GS	GA	P	Cup	Europe	Top Scorer (League)
1960	2nd, RSFSR-3	14	26	3	4	19	26	68	10	-	-	
1961	2nd, RSFSR-4	10	24	6	6	12	32	57	18	1/64	-	
1962	2nd, RSFSR-3	8	28	10	6	12	38	36	26	1/128	-	
1963	3rd, RSFSR-3	7	30	12	8	10	47	39	32	1/512	-	
1964	3rd, RSFSR-4	4	34	16	7	11	53	35	39	1/512	-	
1964	3rd, RSFSR-final	4	8	3	2	3	9	10	8	1/512	-	
1965	3rd, RSFSR-4	9	38	16	7	15	54	43	39	-	-	
1966	3rd, RSFSR-4	1	38	22	9	7	80	40	53	1/32	-	
1966	3rd, RSFSR-final	2	7	4	1	2	9	4	9	1/32	-	
1967	2nd, group 1	16	38	10	11	17	34	45	31	1/32	-	
1968	2nd, group 3	2	40	19	12	9	53	29	50	1/64	-	(Soviet Union) Kaishauri: 18
1969	2nd, group 1	1	38	22	12	4	60	25	60	1/64	-	(Soviet Union) Papelishvili: 16
1969	2nd, final	1	3	2	0	1	4	2	4	1/64	-	(Soviet Union) Papelishvili: 16
1970	Top League	17	32	7	8	17	31	48	22	1/16	-	(Soviet Union) Kaishauri: 8
1971	2nd	5	42	19	7	16	52	57	45	1/16	-	(Soviet Union) Zazroev: 11
1972	2nd	9	38	14	10	14	49	50	38	1/16	-	(Soviet Union) Kaishauri: 18
1973	2nd	17	38	13	7	18	29	44	30	1/16	-	(Soviet Union) Kaishauri: 7
1974	2nd	17	38	15	4	19	45	67	34	1/32	-	(Soviet Union) Kitaev: 17
1975	2nd	9	38	15	7	16	41	43	37	1/32	-	(Soviet Union) V. Gazzaev: 14
1976	2nd	15	38	11	14	13	40	50	36	1/32	-	(Soviet Union) Kaishauri: 11
1977	2nd	15	38	11	11	16	38	45	33	1/32	-	(Soviet Union) Khuadonov: 6
1978	2nd	18	38	10	8	20	30	50	28	1/16	-	(Soviet Union) Khuadonov: 9
1979	2nd	13	46	19	7	20	49	44	45	group stage	-	(Soviet Union) Suanov, (Soviet Union) Zazroev: 9
1980	2nd	15	46	17	9	20	43	50	43	group stage	-	(Soviet Union) Khuadonov: 9
1981	2nd	21	46	14	12	20	36	49	40	group stage	-	(Soviet Union) Y. Gazzaev: 10
1982	3rd, zone 3	1	32	22	6	4	64	18	50	-	-	(Soviet Union) Y. Gazzaev: 23
1982	3rd, final-1	2	4	1	2	1	5	4	4	-	-	
1983	3rd, zone 3	1	30	23	2	5	69	23	48	-	-	
1983	3rd, final-2	1	4	1	3	0	2	0	5	-	-	
1984	2nd	16	42	15	8	19	42	51	38	1/32	-	(Soviet Union) Argudyaev: 13
1985	2nd	16	38	17	4	17	49	52	38	1/16	-	(Soviet Union) Ambalov: 12
1986	2nd	16	46	15	12	19	58	66	42	1/64	-	(Soviet Union) Ploshnik: 16
1987	2nd	18	42	12	12	18	37	46	36	1/64	-	(Soviet Union) Gagloev: 8
1988	2nd	13	42	15	9	8	57	60	39	1/32	-	(Soviet Union) Y. Gazzaev: 10
1989	2nd	17	42	12	11	19	44	61	35	1/64	-	(Soviet Union) Y. Gazzaev: 10, (Soviet Union) Tskhovrebov: 7
1990	2nd	1	38	24	9	5	73	30	57	1/64	-	(Soviet Union) (Russia) Tedeev: 23
1991	Top League	11	30	9	8	13	33	41	26	1/64	-	(Soviet Union) (Azerbaijan) Suleymanov: 13
1992	-	-	-	-	-	-	-	-	-	1/16	-	

==== Russia ====
Season	Div.	Pos.	Pl.	W	D	L	GS	GA	P	Cup	Europe		Top Scorer (League)
1992	RFPL	2	26	13	6	7	47	33	32	-	-		(Azerbaijan) Suleymanov: 12
1993	RFPL	6	34	16	6	12	49	45	38	1/16	-		(Azerbaijan) Suleymanov, (Belarus) Markhel: 14
1994	RFPL	5	30	11	11	8	32	34	33	1/2	UC	R1	(Azerbaijan) Suleymanov: 6
1995	RFPL	1	30	22	5	3	63	21	71	1/2	-		(Georgia (country)) Kavelashvili: 12
1996	RFPL	2	35	22	6	7	65	37	72	1/16	UC	R1	(Azerbaijan) Suleymanov, (Russia) Tedeev, (Uzbekistan) Kasymov: 11
1997	RFPL	10	34	14	4	16	52	42	46	1/8	UC	R1	(Russia) Yanovsky: 13
1998	RFPL	8	30	11	7	12	46	39	40	1/2	UC	R1	(Georgia (country)) Demetradze: 14
1999	RFPL	6	30	12	7	11	54	45	43	1/8	-		(Georgia (country)) Demetradze: 21
2000	RFPL	10	30	10	8	12	34	36	38	1/16	-		(Russia) Tedeev: 10
2001	RFPL	11	30	8	8	14	31	47	32	1/16	UC	R1	(Brazil) Paolo Emilio: 6
2002	RFPL	12	30	8	6	16	31	42	30	1/16	-		(Georgia (country)) Demetradze, (Russia) D. Bazaev: 6
2003	RFPL	13	30	9	4	17	23	43	31	1/16	-		(Latvia) Mikholap: 4
2004	RFPL	14	30	7	7	16	28	52	28	1/8	-		(Russia) G. Bazaev, (Romania) Tudor: 5
2005	RFPL	15	30	5	8	17	27	53	23	1/8	-		(Russia) D. Bazaev: 9
2006	3rd, "South"	1	32	27	3	2	81	20	84	1/16	-		(Russia) Dubrovin: 28
2007	2nd	12	42	15	11	16	56	56	56	1/64	-		(Russia) Dubrovin: 19
2008	2nd	10	42	17	8	17	50	41	59	1/32	-		(Moldova) Dadu: 18
2009	2nd	3	38	21	7	10	57	30	70	1/16	-		(Moldova) Dadu: 12
2010	RFPL	15	30	4	8	18	34	58	20	F	-		(Russia) Gabulov, (Russia) Marenich: 4
2011–12	2nd	2	52	28	13	11	66	39	97	1/32	-		(Uzbekistan) Bikmaev: 11
2012–13	RFPL	16	30	4	7	19	26	53	19	1/16	-		(Brazil) Neco: 9
2013–14	2nd	12	36	14	4	18	29	52	46	1/16	-		(Russia) Khastsayev: 13
2014–15	3rd, "South"	17	20	5	6	9	21	33	21	1/256	-		(Russia) Burayev: 12
2015–16	3rd, "South"	11	24	4	7	13	15	37	19	1/256	-		(Russia) Sikoyev: 7
2016–17	3rd, "South"	10	30	10	7	13	26	36	37	1/128	-		(Russia) Gatikoev: 8
2017–18	3rd, "South"	13	32	8	8	16	26	41	32	1/256	-		(Russia) Gurtsiev: 5
2018–19	3rd, "South"	10	28	8	6	14	36	48	30	1/64	-		(Russia) Zhabkin: 8
2019–20	3rd, "South"	2	19	15	1	3	54	13	46	1/16	-		(Russia) Khadartsev: 12
2020–21	2nd	4	42	22	11	9	74	40	77	1/64	-		(Russia) Gurtsiyev: 13
2021–22	2nd	6	38	17	9	12	75	53	60	1/2	-		(Russia) Mashukov: 14
2022–23	2nd	3	34	17	11	6	56	35	62	1/8	-		(Georgia (country)) (Russia) Nikolay Giorgobiani: 12

1. Alania withdrew from the league in February 2014 due to financial problems.

=== European ===
As of match played 25 August 2011

Competition	Pld	W	D	L	GF	GA
UEFA Cup	12	3	3	6	10	19
UEFA Europa League	4	1	2	1	4	5
UEFA Champions League	2	0	0	2	3	10
Total	18	4	5	9	17	34

Season	Competition	Round	Club	Home	Away	Aggregate
1993–94	UEFA Cup	First round	(Germany) Borussia Dortmund	0–0	0–1	0–1
1995–96	UEFA Cup	First round	(England) Liverpool	1–2	0–0	1–2
1996–97	UEFA Champions League	Preliminary round	(Scotland) Rangers	2–7	1–3	3–10
1996–97	UEFA Cup	First round	(Belgium) Anderlecht	2–1	0–4	2–5
1997–98	UEFA Cup	Second qualifying round	(Ukraine) Dnipro Dnipropetrovsk	2–1	4–1	6–2
1997–98	UEFA Cup	First round	(Hungary) MTK Hungária	1–1	0–3	1–4
2000–01	UEFA Cup	First round	(Poland) Amica Wronki	0–3	0–2	0–5
2011–12	UEFA Europa League	Third qualifying round	(Kazakhstan) Aktobe	1–1	1–1	2–2(p)
2011–12	UEFA Europa League	Play-off round	(Turkey) Beşiktaş	2–0	0–3	2–3

== Honours ==
- Russian Premier League
  - Winners (1): 1995
  - Runners-up (2): 1992, 1996
- Russian Cup
  - Runners-up (1): 2010–11
- Soviet First League
  - Winners (2): 1969, 1990
- Russian Football National League
  - Runners-up (1): 2011–12
- Soviet Second League/Russian Professional Football League
  - Winners (2): 1983, 2006
  - Runners-up (2): 1966, 1982

== Coaching staff ==
Position	Name
Manager	(Russia) Oleg Vasilenko
Assistant manager	(Russia) Denis Popov
Goalkeeping coach	
Fitness coach	
Analyst	(Russia) Alan Tsgoev (Russia) Khasan Misikov
Club doctor	(Russia) Nikolay Gutsalov (Russia) Alan Kaloev
Masseur	(Russia) Yuriy Zuzin (Russia) Toguzov Ruslan Alikovich
Administrator	(Kazakhstan) Paata Razmadze (Russia) Kaloev Batraz
Team Leader	(Serbia) David Ruslanovich

== Current squad ==
As of 11 September 2026, according to the Second League website.

Note: Flags indicate national team as defined under FIFA eligibility rules; some limited exceptions apply. Players may hold more than one non-FIFA nationality.

No.	Pos.	Nation	Player
1	GK	RUS	David Byazrov
2	DF	RUS	Alan Gioyev
3	DF	RUS	Artur Kuskov
4	DF	RUS	Soslan Kachmazov
5	DF	RUS	Alan Bagayev
6	FW	RUS	Artyom Belov
7	MF	RUS	Batraz Gurtsiyev
8	MF	RUS	Alan Khugayev
9	MF	RUS	Artyom Zakirov
10	MF	RUS	David Kobesov
11	FW	RUS	Ivan Matyushenko
13	DF	RUS	Yannis Koybayev
14	DF	RUS	Anzor Amiraliyev
17	DF	RUS	Ruslan Daurov
19	DF	RUS	Allon Butayev
21	FW	RUS	Artur Kozyrev

No.	Pos.	Nation	Player
23	MF	RUS	Viktor Nafikov
27	FW	RUS	Ruslan Gogniyev
30	DF	RUS	David Shavlokhov
31	GK	RUS	Georgi Natabashvili
35	DF	RUS	Sarmat Kasayev
47	FW	RUS	Arsen Revazov
55	FW	RUS	Zaurbek Ramonov
57	FW	RUS	David Tepsikoyev
75	MF	RUS	Sarmat Ogoyev
76	MF	RUS	Georgy Karkuzayev
77	FW	RUS	Alamat Dzestelov
83	FW	RUS	Dato Chertkoyev
89	GK	RUS	Danil Shashlov
97	FW	RUS	Artur Gagiyev
99	FW	RUS	Makhach Abdulkhamidov

=== Out on loan ===
Note: Flags indicate national team as defined under FIFA eligibility rules; some limited exceptions apply. Players may hold more than one non-FIFA nationality.

No.	Pos.	Nation	Player
—	DF	RUS	Artur Byazrov (at Dynamo Stavropol until 31 December 2026)

== Notable players ==
- (Soviet Union) Valeriy Gazzaev
- (Soviet Union) (Russia) Stanislav Cherchesov
- (Soviet Union) (Russia) Zaur Khapov
- (Soviet Union) (Russia) Viktor Bulatov
- (Soviet Union) (Russia) Vasili Baranov
- (Soviet Union) (Russia) Victor Onopko
- (Soviet Union) (Russia) Yuri Kovtun
- (Soviet Union) (Russia) Artur Pagayev
- (Soviet Union) (Russia) Bakhva Tedeev
- (Soviet Union) (Russia) Omari Tetradze
- (Russia) Soslan Dzhanayev
- (Russia) Igor Yanovsky
- (Russia) Spartak Gogniyev
- (Russia) Alan Kasaev
- (Russia) Maksim Petrov
- (Georgia (country)) Mikhail Kavelashvili
- (Georgia (country)) Giorgi Demetradze
- (Georgia (country)) Murtaz Shelia
- (Georgia (country)) Mikheil Ashvetia
- (Georgia (country)) Levan Kobiashvili
- (Georgia (country)) Giorgi Chanturia
- (Uzbekistan) Mirjalol Qosimov
- (Hungary) Tamás Priskin
- (Belarus) (Brazil) Renan Bressan
- (Ivory Coast) Dacosta Goore
- (Nigeria) Isaac Okoronkwo
- (Nigeria) Sani Kaita
- (Bosnia and Herzegovina) Ognjen Vranješ
- (Lithuania) Deividas Semberas
- (Burkina Faso) Ibrahim Gnanou
- (Romania) George Florescu
- (Romania) Cristian Tudor
- (El Salvador) Rodolfo Zelaya
- (Netherlands) Royston Drenthe
- (Azerbaijan) Nazim Suleymanov
- (Moldova) Sergiu Dadu
- (New Zealand) Kosta Barbarouses

== Former coaches ==
- (Soviet Union) Grigoriy Gornostaev (1966–1967)
- (Soviet Union) Mussa Tsalikov (1967)
- (Soviet Union) Andrei Zazroyev (1968–1970)
- (Soviet Union) Kazbek Tuaev (1970)
- (Soviet Union) Sergei Korshunov (1971)
- (Soviet Union) Dmitri Chikhradze (1971)
- (Soviet Union) Andrei Zazroyev (1972)
- (Soviet Union) Ivan Larin (1973)
- (Soviet Union) Kazbek Tuaev (1974–1977)
- (Soviet Union) Viktor Belov (1977–1978)
- (Soviet Union) Mussa Tsalikov (1978–1980)
- (Soviet Union) Andrei Zazroyev (1980–1981)
- (Soviet Union) Aleksandr Kochetkov (1982)
- (Soviet Union) Valeri Maslov (1983)
- (Soviet Union) Ivan Varlamov (1984)
- (Soviet Union) Valeri Ovchinnikov (1985–1986)
- (Soviet Union) Igor Zazroyev (1986–1987)
- (Soviet Union) Oleg Romantsev (1988)
- (Soviet Union) Valeriy Gazzaev (1989–1991)
- (Russia) Nikolay Khudiyev (1991)
- (Russia) Aleksandr Novikov (1992–1993)
- (Russia) Valeriy Gazzaev (1994–1999)
- (Russia) Vladimir Gutsaev (2000)
- (Russia) Aleksandr Averyanov (2000–2001)
- (Russia) Aleksandr Yanovskiy (2001–2002)
- (Ukraine) Volodymyr Muntyan (2002)
- (Russia) Bakhva Tedeyev (2002)
- (Georgia (country)) Revaz Dzodzuashvili (2003)
- (Russia) Nikolay Khudiyev (2003)
- (Russia) Bakhva Tedeyev (2003–2004)
- (France) Rolland Courbis (2004–2005)
- (Russia) Yuri Sekinaev (2004)
- (Russia) Bakhva Tedeyev (2005)
- (Russia) Edgar Gess (2005)
- (Israel) Itzhak Shum (2005)
- (Russia) Aleksandr Yanovskiy (2005–2006)
- (Russia) Boris Stukalov (2006–2007)
- (Russia) Stanislav Tskhovrebov (2007–2008)
- (Russia) Valery Petrakov (2009)
- (Romania) Mircea Rednic (2009)
- (Russia) Vladimir Shevchuk (2010–2011)
- (Russia) Vladimir Gazzayev (2011–2012, 2013–2014)
- (Russia) Valeriy Gazzaev (2012–2013)
- (Russia) Artur Pagayev (2014–2015)
- (Russia) Zaur Tedeyev (2015–2016)
- (Russia) Fyodor Gagloyev (2016)
- (Russia) Marat Dzoblayev (2016–2017)
- (Russia) Yuri Gazzaev (2018)
- (Russia) Spartak Gogniyev (2019–2022)
- (Russia) Zaur Tedeyev (2022–2023)
- (Russia) Oleg Vasilenko (2023-current)
