= 2005 Russian Premier League =

14th season of top-tier football league in Russia

Russian Premier League
- Season: 2005
- Champions: CSKA Moscow
- Relegated: Alania Vladikavkaz; Terek Grozny
- Champions League: CSKA Moscow; Spartak Moscow
- UEFA Cup: Lokomotiv Moscow; Rubin Kazan
- Intertoto Cup: FC Moscow
- Matches: 240
- Goals: 542 (2.26 per match)
- Top goalscorer: Dmitri Kirichenko (14)

The 2005 Russian Premier League was the 14th season of the premier football competition in Russia since the dissolution of the Soviet Union and the 4th under the current Russian Premier League name.

== Teams ==
As in the previous season, 16 teams are playing in the 2005 season. After the 2004 season, Kuban Krasnodar and Rotor Volgograd were relegated to the 2005 Russian First Division. They were replaced by Terek Grozny and Tom Tomsk, the winners and runners up of the 2004 Russian First Division.

=== Venues ===
Alania	Amkar	CSKA	Dynamo
Republican Spartak Stadium	Zvezda Stadium	Central Stadium	Central Stadium
Capacity: 32,464	Capacity: 17,000	Capacity: 36,540	Capacity: 36,540
Krylia Sovetov Samara	Locations of teams in 2004 Russian Premier League Locations of teams in 2005 Russian Premier League (Tomsk)		Lokomotiv Moscow
Metallurg Stadium	Locations of teams in 2004 Russian Premier League Locations of teams in 2005 Russian Premier League (Tomsk)		RZD Arena
Capacity: 27,084	Locations of teams in 2004 Russian Premier League Locations of teams in 2005 Russian Premier League (Tomsk)		Capacity: 33,001
Moscow	Locations of teams in 2004 Russian Premier League Locations of teams in 2005 Russian Premier League (Tomsk)		Rostov
Eduard Streltsov Stadium	Locations of teams in 2004 Russian Premier League Locations of teams in 2005 Russian Premier League (Tomsk)		Olimp-2
Capacity: 13,450	Locations of teams in 2004 Russian Premier League Locations of teams in 2005 Russian Premier League (Tomsk)		Capacity: 15,840
Rubin	Locations of teams in 2004 Russian Premier League Locations of teams in 2005 Russian Premier League (Tomsk)		Saturn
Central Stadium	Locations of teams in 2004 Russian Premier League Locations of teams in 2005 Russian Premier League (Tomsk)		Saturn Stadium
Capacity: 22,500	Locations of teams in 2004 Russian Premier League Locations of teams in 2005 Russian Premier League (Tomsk)		Capacity: 14,685
Shinnik	Locations of teams in 2004 Russian Premier League Locations of teams in 2005 Russian Premier League (Tomsk)		Spartak
Shinnik Stadium	Locations of teams in 2004 Russian Premier League Locations of teams in 2005 Russian Premier League (Tomsk)		Luzhniki Stadium
Capacity: 22,871	Locations of teams in 2004 Russian Premier League Locations of teams in 2005 Russian Premier League (Tomsk)		Capacity: 81,029
Terek	Tom	Torpedo	Zenit Saint Petersburg
Central Stadium	Trud Stadium	Luzhniki Stadium	Petrovsky Stadium
Capacity: 12,500	Capacity: 10,028	Capacity: 81,029	Capacity: 21,570

=== Personnel and kits ===
Team	Location	Head coach	Captain	Kit manufacturer	Shirt sponsor
Alania	Vladikavkaz	(Russia) Aleksandr Yanovsky (Caretaker)		Umbro	—N/a
Amkar Perm	Perm	(Russia) Sergei Oborin		Adidas	—N/a
CSKA	Moscow	(Russia) Valery Gazzaev		Umbro	Sibneft
Dynamo	Moscow	(Russia) Andrey Kobelev (Caretaker)		Umbro	Xerox
Lokomotiv	Moscow	(Russia) Vladimir Eshtrekov		Adidas	
Krylia	Samara	(Russia) Gadzhi Gadzhiyev			
Moscow	Moscow	(Russia) Leonid Slutsky			
Rostov	Rostov-on-Don	(Russia) Sergei Balakhnin		Umbro	—N/a
Rubin	Kazan	(Turkmenistan) Kurban Berdyev		Nike	
Saturn	Ramenskoye	(Russia) Vladimir Shevchuk		Adidas	
Shinnik	Yaroslavl	(Russia) Oleg Dolmatov		Umbro	
Spartak	Moscow	(Latvia) Aleksandrs Starkovs		Nike	
Terek	Pyatigorsk	(Russia) Aleksandr Tarkhanov		Umbro	
Tom	Tomsk	(Ukraine) Anatoliy Byshovets		Adidas	
Torpedo	Moscow	(Russia) Sergei Petrenko		Umbro	—N/a
Zenit	Saint Petersburg	(Czech Republic) Vlastimil Petržela		Adidas	Gazprom

=== Managerial changes ===
Team	Outgoing manager	Manner of departure	Date of vacancy	Position in table	Replaced by	Date of appointment	Position in table
Alania	(Russia) Yuri Sekinayev (Caretaker)			Preseason	(Russia) Bakhva Tedeyev		Preseason
Rostov	(Russia) Sergei Balakhnin			Preseason	(Russia) Gennadi Styopushkin		Preseason
Alania	(Russia) Bakhva Tedeyev		April 2005		(Germany) Edgar Gess	19 April 2005	
Rostov	(Russia) Gennadi Styopushkin	Medical treatment	17 April 2005	16th	(England) Paul Ashworth (Caretaker)	17 April 2005	16th
Rostov	(England) Paul Ashworth (Caretaker)	End of Role	4 May 2005	16th	(Russia) Gennadi Styopushkin	4 May 2005	16th
Dynamo	(Russia) Oleg Romantsev		May 2005		(Russia) Andrey Kobelev (Caretaker)	May 2005	
Lokomotiv	(Russia) Yuri Semin		May 2005		(Russia) Vladimir Eshtrekov	May 2005	
Saturn	(Russia) Aleksandr Tarkhanov		May 2005		(Russia) Vladimir Shevchuk	May 2005	
Alania	(Germany) Edgar Gess		July 2005		(Russia) Aleksandr Yanovsky (Caretaker)	July 2005	
Alania	(Russia) Aleksandr Yanovsky (Caretaker)	End of Role	4 July 2005	14th	(Israel) Itzhak Shum	4 July 2005	14th
Dynamo	(Russia) Andrey Kobelev (Caretaker)	End of Role	19 July 2005	9th	(Brazil) Ivo Wortmann	19 July 2005	9th
Moscow	(Russia) Valery Petrakov		July 2005		(Russia) Leonid Slutsky	July 2005	
Rostov	(Russia) Gennadi Styopushkin		July 2005		(Russia) Valery Petrakov	July 2005	
Rostov	(Russia) Valery Petrakov		August 2005		(Russia) Sergei Balakhnin	August 2005	
Tom	(Russia) Boris Stukalov		August 2005		(Ukraine) Anatoliy Byshovets	August 2005	
Alania	(Israel) Itzhak Shum	Fired	27 September 2005	15th	(Russia) Aleksandr Yanovsky (Caretaker)	27 September 2005	15th
Terek	(Kazakhstan) Vait Talgayev		October 2005		(Russia) Aleksandr Tarkhanov	October 2005	
Dynamo	(Brazil) Ivo Wortmann	Fired	8 November 2005	8th	(Russia) Andrey Kobelev (Caretaker)	8 November 2005	8th

== League table ==
Pos	Team	Pld	W	D	L	GF	GA	GD	Pts	Qualification or relegation
1	CSKA Moscow (C)	30	18	8	4	48	20	+28	62	Qualification to Champions League third qualifying round
2	Spartak Moscow	30	16	8	6	47	26	+21	56	Qualification to Champions League second qualifying round
3	Lokomotiv Moscow	30	14	14	2	41	18	+23	56	Qualification to UEFA Cup first round (Note: Since CSKA Moscow won the 2005–06 Russian Cup, and winner of the Russian Cup should advance to the First Round of UEFA Cup, the spot was awarded to 3rd-positioned team, because CSKA Moscow already qualified for UEFA Champions League. As a result, 4th-positioned team received a spot in the Second Qualifying Round of UEFA Cup, and 5th-positioned team received a spot in the Second Round of UEFA Intertoto Cup)
4	Rubin Kazan	30	14	9	7	45	31	+14	51	Qualification to UEFA Cup second qualifying round
5	FC Moscow	30	14	8	8	36	26	+10	50	Qualification to Intertoto Cup second round
6	Zenit St. Petersburg	30	13	10	7	45	26	+19	49	
7	Torpedo Moscow	30	12	9	9	37	33	+4	45	
8	Dynamo Moscow	20	12	2	6	36	46	−10	38	
9	Shinnik Yaroslavl	30	9	11	10	26	31	−5	38	
10	Tom Tomsk	30	9	10	11	28	33	−5	37	
11	Saturn	30	8	9	13	23	25	−2	33	
12	Amkar Perm	30	7	12	11	25	36	−11	33	
13	Rostov	30	8	7	15	26	41	−15	31	
14	Krylia Sovetov Samara	30	7	8	15	29	44	−15	29	
15	Alania Vladikavkaz (R)	30	5	8	17	27	53	−26	23	Relegation to First Division
16	Terek Grozny (Note: Terek had 6 points deducted for failing to pay transfer fee in time.) (R)	30	5	5	20	20	50	−30	14	Relegation to First Division

Source: RFPL
Rules for classification: 1st points; 2nd matches won; 3rd goal difference; 4th head-to-head (points, matches won, goal difference, goals scored, away goals scored)
(C) Champions; (R) Relegated

== Results ==
Home \ Away	ALA	AMK	CSK	DYN	KRY	LOK	MOS	ROS	RUB	SAT	SHI	SPA	TER	TOM	TOR	ZEN
Alania Vladikavkaz		0–1	1–1	2–4	2–0	0–0	0–2	0–0	4–3	1–1	1–1	2–1	1–0	1–2	2–2	0–3
Amkar Perm	0–0		0–1	4–1	1–1	3–4	0–0	1–0	1–0	3–2	0–0	0–0	0–0	0–0	0–0	1–0
CSKA Moscow	4–3	3–1		2–0	5–0	0–0	1–1	2–1	2–1	1–0	2–0	1–0	3–0	2–0	2–0	1–1
Dynamo Moscow	1–0	1–2	1–2		3–1	0–0	0–2	2–1	3–1	1–0	1–0	0–1	0–1	0–0	2–1	1–2
Krylia Sovetov Samara	2–0	1–0	2–2	0–1		0–0	4–1	1–1	2–2	1–0	1–0	1–3	0–1	1–1	0–1	3–0
Lokomotiv Moscow	3–0	1–1	3–2	4–1	1–0		0–0	4–0	1–0	1–1	0–0	1–1	4–0	2–0	0–3	0–0
FC Moscow	1–0	1–0	0–0	2–1	0–1	0–1		1–0	0–1	0–1	3–2	3–1	2–1	4–1	1–1	2–0
Rostov	1–0	2–0	0–2	0–3	2–1	1–1	1–0		0–1	0–0	2–2	0–1	1–0	2–0	1–1	0–1
Rubin Kazan	4–2	2–0	1–0	2–1	2–1	3–1	1–1	1–1		0–0	2–0	0–0	1–1	0–0	5–1	1–0
Saturn	3–1	2–0	0–1	0–1	1–1	0–0	1–2	2–0	0–0		1–0	1–1	3–2	0–2	1–0	0–0
Shinnik Yaroslavl	1–0	1–1	1–1	2–1	3–1	0–2	0–1	2–1	3–2	1–0		1–3	2–1	0–0	1–3	1–0
Spartak Moscow	5–1	1–1	1–3	5–1	1–0	1–2	0–2	2–0	3–0	1–0	1–1		3–0	2–1	1–0	1–1
Terek Grozny	1–2	2–2	1–0	0–1	2–0	0–3	0–0	2–3	1–5	1–0	0–1	1–2		0–1	0–1	0–0
Tom Tomsk	0–0	3–0	0–0	3–2	4–2	0–0	3–2	1–2	1–2	0–3	0–0	0–1	2–0		1–1	2–0
Torpedo Moscow	3–0	2–1	0–2	2–1	0–0	0–1	2–0	3–1	1–1	2–0	0–0	1–3	2–1	3–0		0–4
Zenit St. Petersburg	3–1	5–1	1–0	4–1	4–1	1–1	2–2	4–2	0–1	1–0	0–0	1–1	5–1	1–0	1–1	

Legend: Blue = home team win; Yellow = draw; Red = away team win.

== Season statistics ==
=== Top goalscorers ===
As of matches played on 19 November 2005.

Rank	Player	Club	Goal
1	(Russia) Dmitri Kirichenko	Moscow	14
2	(Brazil) Derlei	Dynamo	13
3	(Russia) Igor Semshov	Torpedo	12
4	(Russia) Roman Pavlyuchenko	Spartak Moscow	11
5	(Russia) Aleksandr Panov	Torpedo	10
5	(Croatia) Ivica Olić	CSKA	10
7	(Russia) Andrey Arshavin	Zenit	9
7	(Russia) Dzhambulad Bazayev	Alania	9
9	(Russia) Diniyar Bilyaletdinov	Lokomotiv	8
9	(Russia) Maksim Buznikin	Rostov	9
9	(Brazil) Vágner Love	CSKA	9
9	(Czech Republic) Tomáš Čížek	Rubin	9
9	(Russia) Roman Adamov	Terek	9
9	(Russia) Aleksandr Kerzhakov	Zenit	9
9	(Ukraine) Andriy Husin	Krylia	9

=== Statistics ===
- Goals: 539 (average 2.25 per match)
  - From penalties: 58 (11%)
  - Saved/Missed penalties: 17 (23%)
  - Goals scored home: 324 (60%)
  - Goals scored away: 215 (40%)
- Yellow cards: 962 (average 4.01 per match)
  - For violent conduct: 603 (63%)
  - For unsporting behaviour: 287 (30%)
  - For undisciplined behaviour: 21 (2%)
  - Other: 51 (5%)
- Red cards: 32 (average 0.13 per match)
  - For second yellow card: 20 (63%)
  - For denying an obvious goal-scoring opportunity: 3 (9%)
  - For unsporting behaviour: 3 (9%)
  - For insulting language: 3 (9%)
  - For attack wrecking: 1 (3%)
  - For violent conduct: 1 (3%)
- Attendance: 2,881,674 (average 12,006 per match; 96,048 per matchday)

== Awards ==
On December 9 Russian Football Union named its list of 33 top players:

Goalkeepers

1. (Russia) Igor Akinfeev (CSKA Moscow)
2. (Poland) Wojciech Kowalewski (Spartak Moscow)
3. (Russia) Sergei Ovchinnikov (Lokomotiv Moscow)

Right backs

1. (Russia) Vasili Berezutski (CSKA Moscow)
2. (Russia) Aleksandr Anyukov (Krylya Sovetov / Zenit)
3. (Cameroon) Jerry-Christian Tchuissé (FC Moscow)

Right-centre backs

1. (Russia) Sergei Ignashevich (CSKA Moscow)
2. (Georgia (country)) Malkhaz Asatiani (Lokomotiv Moscow)
3. (Brazil) Antônio Géder (Saturn)

Left-centre backs

1. (Serbia) Nemanja Vidić (Spartak Moscow)
2. (Russia) Dmitri Sennikov (Lokomotiv Moscow)
3. (Norway) Erik Hagen (Zenit)

Left backs

1. (Russia) Aleksei Berezutski (CSKA Moscow)
2. (Brazil) Calisto (Rubin)
3. (Czech Republic) Pavel Mareš (Zenit)

Defensive midfielders

1. (Bosnia and Herzegovina) Elvir Rahimić (CSKA Moscow)
2. (Brazil) Francisco Lima (Lokomotiv Moscow)
3. (South Africa) MacBeth Sibaya (Rubin)

Right wingers

1. (Nigeria) Chidi Odiah (CSKA Moscow)
2. (Russia) Marat Izmailov (Lokomotiv Moscow)
3. (Russia) Vladimir Bystrov (Spartak Moscow)

Central midfielders

1. (Brazil) Daniel Carvalho (CSKA Moscow)
2. (Russia) Igor Semshov (Torpedo Moscow)
3. (Russia) Dmitri Loskov (Lokomotiv Moscow)

Left wingers

1. (Russia) Yuri Zhirkov (CSKA Moscow)
2. (Russia) Diniyar Bilyaletdinov (Lokomotiv Moscow)
3. (Russia) Pyotr Bystrov (Saturn)

Right forwards

1. (Russia) Andrei Arshavin (Zenit)
2. (Russia) Dmitri Sychev (Lokomotiv Moscow)
3. (Russia) Aleksandr Kerzhakov (Zenit)

Left forwards

1. (Russia) Dmitri Kirichenko (FC Moscow)
2. (Brazil) Vágner Love (CSKA Moscow)
3. (Brazil) Derlei (Dynamo Moscow)

== Medal squads ==
1. PFC CSKA Moscow

Goalkeepers: Igor Akinfeev (29), Veniamin Mandrykin (1).
Defenders: Deividas Šemberas (Lithuania) (28), Aleksei Berezutski (27 / 2), Vasili Berezutski (27 / 2), Sergei Ignashevich (22 / 5), Bohdan Shershun (Ukraine) (1).
Midfielders: Elvir Rahimić (Bosnia and Herzegovina) (30 / 1), Daniel Carvalho (Brazil) (29 / 4), Evgeni Aldonin (29 / 1), Chidi Odiah (Nigeria) (27 / 2), Miloš Krasić (Serbia) (27 / 2), Rolan Gusev (25 / 4), Dudu (Brazil) (21 / 3), Yuri Zhirkov (20 / 2), Juris Laizāns (Latvia) (3 / 1), Osmar Ferreyra (Argentina) (2), Ivan Taranov (1).
Forwards: Vágner Love (Brazil) (21 / 7), Ivica Olić (Croatia) (20 / 10), Sergey Samodin (12), Aleksandr Salugin (5 / 1), Sergei Pravosud (5).
(league appearances and goals listed in brackets)

One own goal scored by Denis Kovba (Belarus) (FC Krylia Sovetov Samara).

Manager: Valery Gazzaev.

Transferred out during the season: Juris Laizāns (Latvia) (to FC Torpedo Moscow), Osmar Ferreyra (Argentina) (on loan to (Netherlands) PSV Eindhoven), Bohdan Shershun (Ukraine) (to (Ukraine) FC Dnipro Dnipropetrovsk).

2. FC Spartak Moscow

Goalkeepers: Wojciech Kowalewski (Poland) (29), Aleksei Zuev (1).
Defenders: Nemanja Vidić (Serbia) (27 / 2), Clemente Rodríguez (Argentina) (25 / 1), Martin Jiránek (Czech Republic) (22), Ignas Dedura (Lithuania) (18 / 1), Adrian Iencsi (Romania) (13 / 1), Emanuel Pogatetz (Austria) (11), Florin Şoavă (Romania) (7), Dmytro Parfenov (Ukraine) (2).
Midfielders: Yegor Titov (28 / 4), Denis Boyarintsev (27 / 4), Radoslav Kováč (Czech Republic) (27 / 4), Serghei Covalciuc (Moldova) (21 / 2), Maksym Kalynychenko (Ukraine) (18 / 4), Vladimir Bystrov (15 / 3), Aleksandr Samedov (11), Dmitri Alenichev (8), Mozart (Brazil) (7), Andrejs Rubins (Latvia) (5).
Forwards: Roman Pavlyuchenko (25 / 11), Fernando Cavenaghi (Argentina) (25 / 6), Mihajlo Pjanović (Serbia) (17 / 1), Aleksandr Pavlenko (14 / 2), Nikita Bazhenov (10 / 1).

Manager: Aleksandrs Starkovs (Latvia) .

Transferred out during the season: Aleksandr Samedov (to FC Lokomotiv Moscow), Emanuel Pogatetz (Austria) (to (England) Middlesbrough).

3. FC Lokomotiv Moscow

Goalkeepers: Sergei Ovchinnikov (29), Aleksei Poliakov (Uzbekistan) (1).
Defenders: Dmitri Sennikov (29 / 1), Malkhaz Asatiani (Georgia (country)) (28 / 3), Sergei Gurenko (Belarus) (26), Vadim Evseev (21 / 2), Oleg Pashinin (Uzbekistan) (18 / 1), Sergei Omelyanchuk (Belarus) (13), Dmitri Kruglov (Estonia) (8), Aleksei Bugayev (8).
Midfielders: Dmitri Khokhlov (30 / 3), Diniyar Bilyaletdinov (29 / 8), Francisco Lima (Brazil) (26), Dmitri Loskov (22 / 6), Vladimir Maminov (20), Marat Izmailov (16 / 4), André Bikey (Cameroon) (9), Aleksandr Samedov (9).
Forwards: Igor Lebedenko (23 / 6), Dmitri Sychev (21 / 6), Francesco Ruopolo (Italy) (7), Winston Parks (Costa Rica) (5), Essau Kanyenda (Malawi) (3), Maksim Buznikin (2), Mikheil Ashvetia (Georgia (country)) (2), Giorgi Chelidze (Georgia (country)) (2), Ruslan Pimenov (1).

One own goal scored by Mykhaylo Starostyak (Ukraine) (FC Shinnik Yaroslavl).

Manager: Yuri Syomin (until April), Vladimir Eshtrekov (from April).

Transferred out during the season: Winston Parks (Costa Rica) (on loan to FC Saturn Moscow Oblast), Essau Kanyenda (Malawi) (on loan to FC Rostov), Maksim Buznikin (to FC Rostov), Mikheil Ashvetia (Georgia (country)) (to FC Rostov), Ruslan Pimenov (to FC Alania Vladikavkaz).

== Attendances ==
Rank	Club	Average
1	Krylia Sovetov	20,833
2	Zenit	20,385
3	Spartak Moscow	19,733
4	Alania	17,600
5	Amkar	13,133
6	Tom	13,053
7	Lokomotiv Moscow	12,140
8	Rubin	12,053
9	PFC CSKA	11,740
10	Saturn	9,900
11	Shinnik	9,307
12	Rostov	8,767
13	Dynamo Moscow	8,500
14	Torpedo Moscow	6,520
15	FC Moscow	6,247
16	Terek	5,947

== See also ==
- 2005 in Russian football
