= David Kobesov =

Russian footballer (born 2000)

Personal information
- Full name: David Bidzinayevich Kobesov
- Date of birth: 6 January 2000 (age 26)
- Place of birth: Vladikavkaz, Russia
- Height: 1.82 m (5 ft 11 1/2 in)
- Position: Midfielder

Team information
- Current team: Alania Vladikavkaz
- Number: 10

Senior career*
Years	Team	Apps	(Gls)
2016	Strogino-M Moscow		
2017–2019	Spartak Vladikavkaz	18	(2)
2019–2022	Alania Vladikavkaz	74	(13)
2022–2025	Pari Nizhny Novgorod	2	(0)
2023	→ Khimki (loan)	4	(0)
2023–2024	→ Alania Vladikavkaz (loan)	12	(0)
2024	→ Alania-2 Vladikavkaz (loan)	2	(0)
2025–	Alania Vladikavkaz	24	(3)
- * Club domestic league appearances and goals as of 15 November 2026

David Bidzinayevich Kobesov (Russian: Давид Бидзинаевич Кобесов; born 6 January 2000) is a Russian football player who plays for Alania Vladikavkaz.

== Club career ==
He made his debut in the Russian Football National League for Alania Vladikavkaz on 1 August 2020 in a game against SKA-Khabarovsk, he substituted Batraz Gurtsiyev in the 55th minute.

On 13 July 2022, Kobesov signed a three-year contract with Russian Premier League club Pari Nizhny Novgorod. He made his RPL debut for Pari NN on 24 July 2022 against Khimki.

On 27 January 2023, Kobesov joined Khimki on loan, reuniting with Spartak Gogniyev who was his manager at Alania.

On 29 June 2023, Kobesov returned to Alania Vladikavkaz on a season-long loan with an option to buy.

== Career statistics ==
As of 27 November 2022

Club	Season	League			Cup		Continental		Total	
Club	Season	Division	Apps	Goals	Apps	Goals	Apps	Goals	Apps	Goals
Spartak Vladikavkaz	2017–18	Second League	7	0	–		–		7	0
Spartak Vladikavkaz	2018–19	Second League	10	2	–		–		10	2
Spartak Vladikavkaz	Total		17	2	0	0	0	0	17	2
Alania Vladikavkaz	2019–20	Second League	11	1	4	1	–		15	2
Alania Vladikavkaz	2020–21	First League	32	4	0	0	–		32	4
Alania Vladikavkaz	2021–22	First League	31	8	5	1	–		36	9
Alania Vladikavkaz	Total		74	13	9	2	0	0	83	15
Pari NN	2022–23	RPL	2	0	2	0	–		4	0
Career total			93	15	11	2	0	0	104	17
