= Paulo Emilio =

Paulo Emilio may refer to:

- Paulo Emilio (footballer, born 1936) (1936–2016), Brazilian football manager and former footballer
- Paulo Emilio (footballer, born 1972), Brazilian footballer
