= Tsalikov =

Tsalikov Russian: Цаликов) feminine: Tsalikova, is a Russian-language patronymic surname of Ossetian origin associated woth the noble Ossetian Tsalikov fmily (Iron Ossetic: Цæлыккатæ). Notable people with the surname include:

- Kantemir Tsalikov (1908–1944, Ossetian Red Army commander
- Ruslan Tsalikov (born 1956), Russian military officer
- Mussa Tsalikov, Russian footballer and coach
