= Ruslan Gogniyev =

Russian footballer

Personal information
- Full name: Ruslan Spartakovich Gogniyev
- Date of birth: 27 July 2002 (age 24)
- Height: 1.78 m (5 ft 10 in)
- Position: Forward

Team information
- Current team: Alania Vladikavkaz
- Number: 27

Youth career
- Spartak Vladikavkaz

Senior career*
Years	Team	Apps	(Gls)
2019–2020	Spartak Vladikavkaz	8	(0)
2021–2023	Alania Vladikavkaz	1	(0)
2021–2023	Alania-2 Vladikavkaz	73	(11)
2024–2025	Lada-Tolyatti	25	(5)
2025–	Alania Vladikavkaz	26	(2)
- * Club domestic league appearances and goals as of 15 November 2026

Ruslan Spartakovich Gogniyev (Russian: Руслан Спартакович Гогниев; born 27 July 2002) is a Russian football player who plays for Alania Vladikavkaz .

== Club career ==
He made his debut in the Russian Football National League for Alania Vladikavkaz on 28 April 2021 in a game against Krasnodar-2.

== Personal life ==
His father Spartak Gogniyev is a football coach and former player.
