= Georgi Natabashvili =

Russian footballer

Personal information
- Full name: Georgi Valeryevich Natabashvili
- Date of birth: 21 February 2000 (age 26)
- Place of birth: Moscow, Russia
- Height: 1.88 m (6 ft 2 in)
- Position: Goalkeeper

Team information
- Current team: Alania Vladikavkaz
- Number: 31

Senior career*
Years	Team	Apps	(Gls)
2018	Olimp Khimki (amateur)		
2019–2020	Spartak Vladikavkaz	18	(0)
2020–2021	Alania Vladikavkaz	2	(0)
2021	Alania-2 Vladikavkaz	3	(0)
2022	Olimp-Dolgoprudny	9	(0)
2022–2025	Alania Vladikavkaz	16	(0)
2022–2024	Alania-2 Vladikavkaz	14	(0)
2025–2026	Murom	12	(0)
2026	Chernomorets Novorossiysk	0	(0)
2026–	Alania Vladikavkaz	0	(0)
- * Club domestic league appearances and goals as of 15 November 2026

Georgi Valeryevich Natabashvili (Russian: Георгий Валерьевич Натабашвили; born 21 February 2000) is a Russian football player of Georgian descent who plays for Alania Vladikavkaz.

== Club career ==
He made his debut in the Russian Football National League for Alania Vladikavkaz on 1 August 2020 in a game against SKA-Khabarovsk, as a starter.
