= Zaur Tedeyev =

Russian footballer and coach

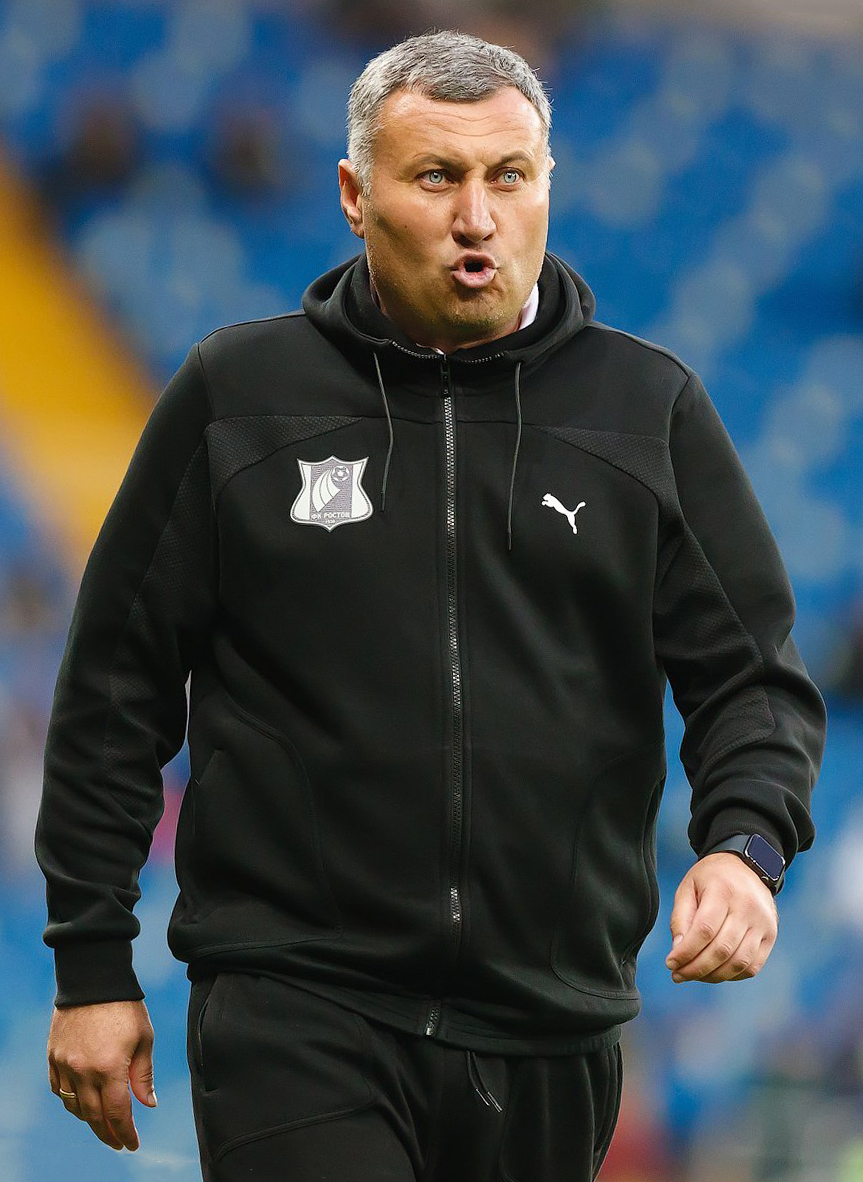
- Tedeyev in 2021

Personal information
- Full name: Zaur Eduardovich Tedeyev
- Date of birth: 18 September 1981 (age 45)
- Place of birth: Ordzhonikidze, Russian SFSR
- Height: 1.79 m (5 ft 10 1/2 in)
- Position: Midfielder

Senior career*
Years	Team	Apps	(Gls)
1997	Alania-d Vladikavkaz	15	(0)
1998	Alania-2 Vladikavkaz	24	(2)
1999–2003	Alania Vladikavkaz	1	(0)
2004–2005	Avtodor Vladikavkaz	27	(1)

Managerial career
- 2008: Avtodor Vladikavkaz
- 2010–2012: FAYUR Beslan
- 2012–2014: Alania-d Vladikavkaz
- 2014: Atyrau (assistant)
- 2015–2016: Alania Vladikavkaz
- 2019–2021: Rostov (U19)
- 2021: Rostov (caretaker)
- 2021–2022: Rostov (assistant)
- 2022: Rostov (U19)
- 2022–2023: Alania Vladikavkaz
- 2023–2026: Akron Tolyatti
- * Club domestic league appearances and goals

Zaur Eduardovich Tedeyev (Russian: Заур Эдуардович Тедеев; born 18 September 1981) is a Russian professional football coach and a former player.

== Playing career ==
As a player, he made his debut in the Russian Premier League in 1999 for Alania Vladikavkaz.

== Coaching career ==
On 25 September 2021, he was appointed caretaker manager of Rostov. On 26 October 2021, Vitaly Kafanov was appointed as Rostov's manager, and Tedeyev was appointed as Kafanov's assistant. Rostov won 2 out of 4 games under Tedeyev's management.

In the 2023–24 season, Tedeyev led Akron Tolyatti to the Russian Premier League promotion for the first time in club's history. Tedeyev was dismissed by Akron on 17 May 2026 after the end of the RPL regular season, as Akron finished 13th and qualified for relegation play-offs, but before the play-offs were played.
