= Sergiu Dadu =

Moldovan footballer

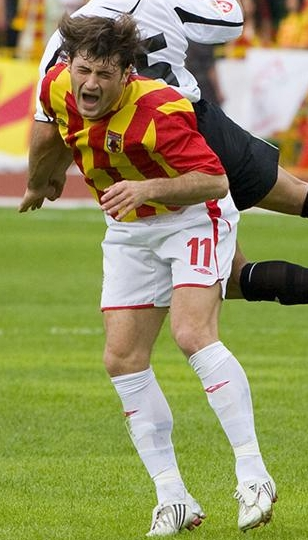
- Dadu with Alania Vladikavkaz in 2008

Personal information
- Date of birth: 23 January 1981 (age 45)
- Place of birth: Chișinău, Moldavian SSR, Soviet Union
- Height: 1.88 m (6 ft 2 in)
- Position: Forward

Senior career*
Years	Team	Apps	(Gls)
1999–2004	Sheriff Tiraspol	30	(16)
2000–2001	→ Haiducul Sporting Hînceşti (loan)	3	(0)
2002	→ FC Tiraspol (loan)	27	(16)
2003–2004	→ Alania Vladikavkaz (loan)	13	(3)
2004–2005	CSKA Moscow	1	(0)
2005	→ Alania Vladikavkaz (loan)	27	(6)
2006	Sheriff Tiraspol	14	(8)
2007–2008	Midtjylland	23	(5)
2008	→ Alania Vladikavkaz (loan)	36	(18)
2009–2010	Alania Vladikavkaz	34	(12)
2012–2013	Sheriff Tiraspol	11	(3)
Total		219	(87)

International career
–2003	Moldova U21	?	(?)
2002–2012	Moldova	30	(8)
- * Club domestic league appearances and goals

Sergiu Dadu (born 23 January 1981) is a Moldovan former footballer who played as a striker. He was also a member of Moldova national football team.

== Club career ==
Dadu was born in Chişinău. He started his career at Sheriff Tiraspol and was loaned to Constructorul Chişinău in January 2002. He played the league rival until January 2003. In summer 2003, he left on loan to Alania Vladikavkaz along with Cristian Tudor.

Dadu was left for CSKA Moscow in summer 2004, but left on loan to Alania Vladikavkaz again in 2005 season.

== International career ==
He played 5 games in UEFA Euro 2008 Qualifying and 9 games in 2006 FIFA World Cup qualification (UEFA).

=== International goals ===
Scores and results list Moldova's goal tally first.

#	Date	Venue	Opponent	Score	Result	Competition
1.	12 February 2003	Mikheil Meskhi Stadium, Tbilisi	Georgia	2–2	2–2	Friendly
2.	10 September 2003	Sheriff Stadium, Tiraspol	Belarus	1–0	2–1	Euro 2004 qualifier
3.	20 November 2003	Stade Josy Barthel, Luxembourg	Luxembourg	2–1	2–1	Friendly
4.	31 March 2004	Stadionul Republican, Chișinău	Azerbaijan	1–1	2–1	Friendly
5.	31 March 2004	Stadionul Republican, Chișinău	Azerbaijan	2–1	2–1	Friendly
6.	13 October 2004	Sheriff Stadium, Tiraspol	Scotland	1–0	1–1	2006 World Cup qualifier
7.	16 August 2006	Zimbru Stadium, Chișinău	Lithuania	1–1	3–2	Friendly
8.	16 October 2012	Stadio Olimpico, Serravalle	San Marino	1–0	2–0	2014 World Cup qualifier
Correct as of 7 October 2015
