= Giorgi Demetradze =

Georgian footballer (born 1976)

Georgi Demetradze გიორგი დემეტრაძე
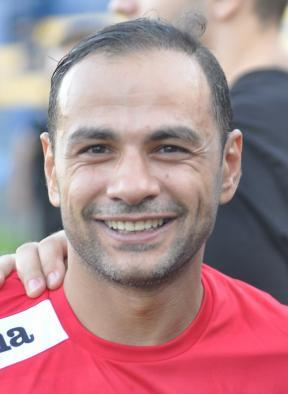

Personal information
- Date of birth: 26 September 1976 (age 50)
- Place of birth: Tbilisi, Georgian SSR, Soviet Union
- Height: 1.69 m (5 ft 7 in)
- Position: Striker

Senior career*
Years	Team	Apps	(Gls)
1992–1994	Kakheti Telavi	31	(16)
1994–1998	Dinamo Tbilisi	69	(51)
1997–1998	→ Feyenoord (loan)	7	(0)
1998–1999	Alania Vladikavkaz	44	(35)
2000	Dynamo Kyiv	26	(15)
2000	→ Dynamo-2 Kyiv	8	(9)
2001–2003	Real Sociedad	13	(1)
2002	→ Lokomotiv Moscow (loan)	6	(0)
2002	→ Alania Vladikavkaz (loan)	16	(6)
2003–2007	Metalurh Donetsk	86	(34)
2005	→ Alania Vladikavkaz (loan)	11	(1)
2006	→ Maccabi Tel Aviv (loan)	13	(3)
2007–2008	Arsenal Kyiv	18	(3)
2008–2009	FC Baku	10	(2)
2009–2010	Spartak Tskhinvali	6	(1)
Total		363	(178)

International career
1996–1997	Georgia U21	6	(1)
1996–2007	Georgia	56	(12)
- * Club domestic league appearances and goals

Georgi Demetradze (Georgian: გიორგი დემეტრაძე; born 26 September 1976) is a Georgian former professional footballer who played as a striker. He made 56 appearances for the Georgia national team scoring 12 goals.

== Career ==
Born in Tbilisi, Demetradze played for the Dinamo Tbilisi youth team and signed for the club in 1994 after spending two seasons with Kakheti Telavi. He has become the Georgian league top scorer with Dinamo.

In 1997 Demetradze moved to Rotterdam to play for Feyenoord, but an injury limited his playing time. After one season in Netherlands, he moved to Russia to play for Alania Vladikavkaz. With them Demetradze has become Russian Top Division top scorer in 1999. In 2000, he transferred to Dynamo Kyiv to become a Ukrainian champion. While there he famously missed an open goal against Manchester United in the Champions League that would have seen the English side eliminated from the competition.

After a year at Real Sociedad Demetradze returned to Russia where he spent half a season with Lokomotiv Moscow and half a season with Alania.

In 2003, he moved to Ukraine again, to play for Metalurh Donetsk. He spent 2.5 seasons with them. In mid-2005 he went to play for Alania for the third time. After Alania were relegated, Demetradze transferred to Maccabi Tel Aviv. In 2005 Demetradze participated in three different Leagues. In 2007, he returned to Ukraine and played for Arsenal Kyiv. A year later he signed an annual contract with Azerbaijani football club FC Baku.

== Post-retirement ==
Demetradze was arrested by Georgian police in July 2010, and on 23 March 2011 he was found guilty of extortion from people who lost at illegal betting on sports, and sentenced to six years of imprisonment. He was released from prison as a political prisoner on 13 January 2013. Demetradze later married and had a daughter.

== Career statistics ==
All data on his participation in the top league of Ukraine can be found at the FFU official website and supplemented by the National Football Teams website.

Appearances and goals by club, season and competition
Club	Season	League			Ref.
Club	Season	Division	Apps	Goals	Ref.
Kakheti Telavi	1992–93	Umaglesi Liga	9	2	
Kakheti Telavi	1993–94	Umaglesi Liga	22	14	
Kakheti Telavi	Total		31	16	–
Dinamo Tbilisi	1994–95	Umaglesi Liga	17	8	
Dinamo Tbilisi	1995–96	Umaglesi Liga	26	17	
Dinamo Tbilisi	1996–97	Umaglesi Liga	26	26	
Dinamo Tbilisi	Total		69	51	–
Feyenoord (loan)	1997–98	Eredivisie	7	0	
Alania Vladikavkaz	1998	Russian Premier League	15	14	
Alania Vladikavkaz	1999	Russian Premier League	29	21	
Alania Vladikavkaz	Total		44	35	–
Dynamo Kyiv	1999–00	Ukrainian Premier League	14	7	
Dynamo Kyiv	2000–01	Ukrainian Premier League	12	8	
Dynamo Kyiv	Total		26	15	–
Real Sociedad	2000–01	La Liga	4	0	
Real Sociedad	2001–02	La Liga	9	1	
Real Sociedad	Total		13	1	–
Alania Vladikavkaz (loan)	2002	Russian Premier League	6	0	
Lokomotiv Moscow (loan)	2002	Russian Premier League	16	6	
Metalurh Donetsk	2002–03	Ukrainian Premier League	15	8	
Metalurh Donetsk	2003–04	Ukrainian Premier League	28	18	
Metalurh Donetsk	2004–05	Ukrainian Premier League	23	5	
Metalurh Donetsk	Total		66	31	–
Alania Vladikavkaz (loan)	2005	Russian Premier League	11	1	
Maccabi Tel Aviv (loan)	2005–06	Israeli Premier League	13	3	
Metalurh Donetsk	2005–06	Ukrainian Premier League	3	2	
Metalurh Donetsk	2006–07	Ukrainian Premier League	16	2	
Metalurh Donetsk	Total		19	4	–
Arsenal Kyiv	2007–08	Ukrainian Premier League	18	3	
FC Baku	2008–09	Azerbaijan Premier League	10	2	
FC Tskhinvali	2009–10	Umaglesi Liga	6	1	
Career total			355	169	–
