= Artur Pagayev =

Russian footballer and coach

Personal information
- Full name: Artur Sardionovich Pagayev
- Date of birth: 28 December 1971 (age 54)
- Place of birth: Kardzhin, Soviet Union
- Height: 1.89 m (6 ft 2 in)
- Position: Defender

Team information
- Current team: FC Alania Vladikavkaz (asst coach)

Senior career*
Years	Team	Apps	(Gls)
1990–2005	FC Alania Vladikavkaz	303	(10)
2005	FC Sochi-04	6	(0)
2006–2007	FC Alania Vladikavkaz	20	(0)

International career
1998	Russia	2	(0)

Managerial career
- 2008–2010: FC Anzhi Makhachkala (assistant)
- 2010–2011: FC Volga Nizhny Novgorod (assistant)
- 2014–2015: FC Alania Vladikavkaz
- 2021–: FC Alania Vladikavkaz (assistant)
- * Club domestic league appearances and goals

Artur Sardionovich Pagayev (Russian: Артур Сардионович Пагаев; born 28 December 1971) is an association football coach and a former player who played the bulk of his career for FC Alania Vladikavkaz. He is an assistant coach with FC Alania Vladikavkaz.

== Honours ==
- Russian Premier League winner: 1995.
- Russian Premier League runner-up: 1992, 1996.

== International career ==
Pagayev made his debut for Russia on 27 May 1998 in a friendly against Poland.
