= Fyodor Gagloyev =

Russian footballer

Personal information
- Full name: Fyodor Ivanovich Gagloyev
- Date of birth: 26 September 1966 (age 60)
- Place of birth: Ordzhonikidze, Russian SFSR
- Height: 1.76 m (5 ft 9 1/2 in)
- Positions: Forward; midfielder

Youth career
- Navbahor Namangan

Senior career*
Years	Team	Apps	(Gls)
1983–1985	FC Spartak Ordzhonikidze	20	(2)
1985–1986	FC Dynamo Moscow	0	(0)
1986	FC Dnipro Dnipropetrovsk	0	(0)
1987–1989	FC Spartak Ordzhonikidze	47	(8)
1989	FC Uralan Elista	11	(5)
1990	FC Aktyubinets	22	(6)
1991–1992	FK Neftchi Farg'ona	38	(5)
1992	FC Dynamo Stavropol	18	(1)
1992	FC Dynamo Izobilny	1	(0)
1993–1994	FC Dynamo Stavropol	44	(10)
1994–1995	FC Lokomotiv Nizhny Novgorod	19	(5)
1995	FC Krylia Sovetov Samara	8	(2)
1996	FC Energiya-Tekstilshchik Kamyshin	20	(4)
1997	FC Samotlor-XXI Nizhnevartovsk	0	(0)
1997–1998	FC Dynamo Stavropol	18	(1)

Managerial career
- 1999: FC Dynamo Stavropol
- 2001: FC Volochanin-89 Vyshny Volochyok (vice-president)
- 2001: FC Ratmir Tver (vice-president)
- 2001–2002: FC Ratmir Tver
- 2003: FC Dynamo Tula (technical director)
- 2003: FC Tekstilshchik Ivanovo (caretaker)
- 2004: FC Zhemchuzhina Budyonnovsk (assistant)
- 2004: FC Zhemchuzhina Budyonnovsk (director)
- 2004: FC Lokomotiv-NN Nizhny Novgorod
- 2006–2007: FC Dynamo-2 Stavropol (director)
- 2012: FC Khimki-M
- 2013: FC Mashuk-KMV Pyatigorsk
- 2015: FC Oryol
- 2016: FC Alania Vladikavkaz
- * Club domestic league appearances and goals

Fyodor Ivanovich Gagloyev (Russian: Фёдор Иванович Гаглоев; born 26 September 1966) is a Russian professional football coach and a former player.

He made his professional debut in the Soviet Second League in 1983 for FC Spartak Ordzhonikidze. He played 1 game for the main squad of FC Dynamo Moscow in the USSR Federation Cup.

== Honours ==
- Uzbek League champion: 1992.
