= Mussa Tsalikov =

Russian footballer and coach

Personal information
- Full name: Mussa Danilovich Tsalikov
- Date of birth: February 22, 1937 (age 89)
- Place of birth: Ordzhonikidze, Soviet Union
- Position: Midfielder

Senior career*
Years	Team	Apps	(Gls)
1956	FC Metallurg Ordzhonikidze		
1959	FC Temp Makhachkala	23	(3)
1960	FC Sibselmash Novosibirsk	22	(3)
1961–1963	FC Spartak Ordzhonikidze	9	(0)
Total		54	(6)

Managerial career
- 1968–1969: FC Spartak Ordzhonikidze (assistant)
- 1971–1972: FC Spartak Ordzhonikidze (assistant)
- 1973: FC Spartak Ordzhonikidze (team director)
- 1976: FC Terek Grozny (team director)
- 1978–1980: FC Spartak Ordzhonikidze
- * Club domestic league appearances and goals

Mussa Danilovich Tsalikov (or Musa Danilbekovich Tsalikov) (Russian: Мусса Данилович Цаликов/Муса Данилбекович Цаликов; born in 1937) is a Russian football player and coach.

He is the first coach of Valery Gazzaev.
