= Spartak Gogniyev =

Russian footballer

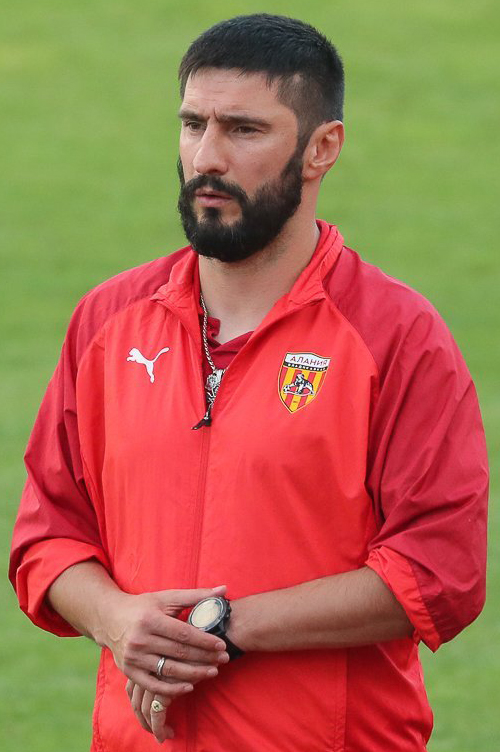
- Gogniyev coaching Alania in 2021

Personal information
- Full name: Spartak Arturovich Gogniyev
- Date of birth: 19 January 1981 (age 45)
- Place of birth: Ordzhonikidze, Russian SFSR
- Height: 1.85 m (6 ft 1 in)
- Position: Forward

Youth career
- FC Iriston Vladikavkaz

Senior career*
Years	Team	Apps	(Gls)
1998	FC Iriston Vladikavkaz	34	(4)
1999–2000	FC Avtodor Vladikavkaz	47	(17)
2000–2001	FC Dynamo Moscow	28	(7)
2001–2004	PFC CSKA Moscow	46	(9)
2004	FC Rotor Volgograd	16	(5)
2005	FC Alania Vladikavkaz	28	(6)
2006	FC Saturn Ramenskoye	7	(1)
2006	FC Rostov	11	(3)
2007	FC Kuban Krasnodar	12	(0)
2008–2010	FC KAMAZ Naberezhnye Chelny	96	(47)
2010–2011	FC Krasnodar	31	(5)
2012–2016	FC Ural Sverdlovsk Oblast	96	(39)
2016–2018	FC Kuban Krasnodar	48	(15)
Total		500	(158)

International career
2000–2003	Russia U21	19	(13)
2004	Russia-2	1	(1)

Managerial career
- 2018–2019: FC Spartak Vladikavkaz
- 2019–2022: FC Alania Vladikavkaz
- 2022–2023: FC Khimki
- 2024–2026: FC Alania Vladikavkaz
- * Club domestic league appearances and goals

Spartak Arturovich Gogniyev (Russian: Спартак Артурович Гогниев, Iron Ossetic: Гогуниты Артуры фырт Спартак; born 19 January 1981) is a Russian professional football coach and a former player.

== Playing career ==
He made his debut in the Russian Premier League in 2000 for FC Dynamo Moscow. He played two games in the UEFA Cup 2000–01 for FC Dynamo Moscow and two games (scoring one goal) in the UEFA Champions League 2003–04 qualification round for PFC CSKA Moscow.

In August 2018, it was announced that Spartak Gogniyev joined new FC Urozhay Krasnodar, but this wasn't confirmed.

== Coaching career ==
On 28 December 2018, he was appointed the head coach of FC Spartak Vladikavkaz. In July 2019, he moved from Spartak to the new club FC Alania Vladikavkaz.

On 2 September 2022, Gogniyev was hired by Russian Premier League club FC Khimki. He left Khimki on 3 April 2023, following a 0–6 home loss to FC Krasnodar.

Gogniyev returned to Alania on 17 September 2024, with the club in the relegation zone in the Russian First League.

== Personal life ==
His son Ruslan Gogniyev made his debut as professional footballer in 2019.

== Honours ==
- Russian Premier League (1): 2003
- Russian Cup (1): 2002
- Russian First Division best striker: 2010
- Russian National Football League top scorer: 2012–13 (17 goals)
