= Stanislav Tskhovrebov =

Russian footballer and coach

Personal information
- Full name: Stanislav Soslanovich Tskhovrebov
- Date of birth: 27 February 1969 (age 57)
- Place of birth: Karaganda, Soviet Union (now Kazakhstan)
- Height: 1.75 m (5 ft 9 in)
- Position: Forward

Senior career*
| Years | Team | Apps | (Gls) |
| 1986–1992 | Spartak Vladikavkaz | 180 | (33) |
| 1991 | Spartak Moscow | 0 | (0) |
| 1991–1992 | Spartak Vladikavkaz | 22 | (1) |
| 1993 | Slovan Bratislava | 10 | (1) |
| 1993–1994 | Nitra | 8 | (1) |
| 1996 | Dukla Hranice | | |
| 1997 | Koba Senec | | |
| 1998 | Gabčíkovo | | |
| 1998–1999 | Avtodor Vladikavkaz | 63 | (29) |
| 2000 | SKA Rostov-on-Don | 17 | (6) |

Managerial career
- 2001: Alania Vladikavkaz (reserves assistant)
- 2001–2002: Alania Vladikavkaz (assistant)
- 2005–2006: Alania Vladikavkaz (assistant)
- 2007–2008: Alania Vladikavkaz
- 2010: Neftekhimik Nizhnekamsk
- 2020: Mashuk-KMV Pyatigorsk
- * Club domestic league appearances and goals

Stanislav Soslanovich Tskhovrebov (Russian: Станислав Сосланович Цховребов; born 27 February 1969) is a Russian professional football coach and a former player.

Tskhovrebov spent one seasons in the Slovak top division with Nitra, appearing in eight league matches.

== Honours ==
- Russian Premier League runner-up: 1992.
- Czechoslovak First League bronze: 1993.
