= Viktor Belov =

Russian footballer and manager (1925–2001)

Personal information
- Full name: Viktor Petrovich Belov
- Date of birth: 23 January 1925
- Place of birth: Moscow, Russian SFSR
- Date of death: 29 September 2001 (aged 76)
- Place of death: Moscow, Russia
- Position: Defender

Youth career
- FC Sniper Moscow

Senior career*
Years	Team	Apps	(Gls)
1945–1948	FC MVO Moscow	1	(0)
1948–1951	FC CDSA Moscow	13	(0)
1951–1953	FC Spartak Moscow	18	(1)
1953	FC Spartak Kalinin		
1954	FC Torpedo Gorky	17	(1)
1955–1957	FC Krylia Sovetov Voronezh		

Managerial career
- 1959–1960: FC Metallurg Nizhny Tagil
- 1961: FC Trud Voronezh (assistant)
- 1961–1963: FC Trud Voronezh
- 1964–1966: FC Lokomotiv Chelyabinsk
- 1967: FC Trud Voronezh (team director)
- 1968–1969: FC Trud Voronezh
- 1969–1970: FC Druzhba Maykop
- 1971–1974: FC Metallurg Lipetsk
- 1977–1978: FC Spartak Ordzhonikidze
- 1978–1979: FC Sokol Saratov
- 1980–1983: FC Znamya Truda Orekhovo-Zuyevo
- 1984–1988: FC Rodina Khimki
- * Club domestic league appearances and goals

Viktor Petrovich Belov (Russian: Виктор Петрович Белов; born 23 January 1925 in Moscow; died 29 September 2001 in Moscow) was a Soviet Russian football player and coach.

Belov managed FC Metallurg Lipetsk in the Soviet First League and Soviet Second League from 1971 until 1974.
