= Stanislav Dubrovin =

Russian-Uzbekistani footballer

Stanislav Dubrovin Станислав Дубровин
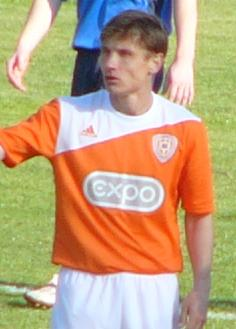

Personal information
- Full name: Stanislav Vladimirovich Dubrovin
- Date of birth: 2 September 1974 (age 52)
- Place of birth: Tashkent, Uzbek SSR
- Height: 1.76 m (5 ft 9 in)
- Position: Striker

Senior career*
Years	Team	Apps	(Gls)
1991	FC Konchi Angren	21	(5)
1992	FC Pakhtakor-79 Tashkent	2	(0)
1992	FK Yangier	2	(0)
1993	FK Chirchik	23	(7)
1994	FC Dynamo Vologda	30	(8)
1995	FC Zhemchuzhina Sochi	11	(3)
1995	FC Volgar-Gazprom Astrakhan	8	(1)
1996	FC Dynamo-Zhemchuzhina-2 Sochi	30	(32)
1997	FC Samotlor-XXI Nizhnevartovsk	27	(10)
1998	FC Zhemchuzhina Sochi	0	(0)
1998	FC Chkalovets Novosibirsk	13	(1)
1999–2001	Dinaburg FC	74	(38)
2001–2002	Maccabi Kiryat Gat F.C.	22	(9)
2002–2003	Hapoel Petah Tikva F.C.	22	(3)
2003–2006	Maccabi Petah Tikva F.C.	81	(20)
2006–2007	FC Alania Vladikavkaz	64	(47)
2008	FC Ural Sverdlovsk Oblast	38	(14)
2009–2010	FC Zhemchuzhina Sochi	68	(26)
2011	FC Neftekhimik Nizhnekamsk	12	(2)
2011	FC Ufa	6	(0)
2012	FC Olimpia Gelendzhik	8	(2)
2013	FC Tambov	5	(0)
2013–2015	FC Metallist Domodedovo		
2015–2016	FC Lyubertsy		
2016	FC Titan Klin (amateur)		

Managerial career
- 2016: FC Volga Tver (assistant)
- * Club domestic league appearances and goals

Stanislav Vladimirovich Dubrovin (Russian: Станислав Владимирович Дубровин; born 2 September 1974) is a Russian-Uzbekistani football coach and a former player.

Dubrovin has played in the Russian First Division for FC Zhemchuzhina Sochi, FC Alania Vladikavkaz and FC Ural Sverdlovsk Oblast.

== Honours ==
- Russian Third League Zone 2 top scorer: 1996 (32 goals)
- Russian Second Division Zone South top scorer: 2006 (28 goals)
