= Marat Dzoblayev =

Russian footballer and coach

Personal information
- Full name: Marat Azikhanovich Dzoblayev
- Date of birth: 1 September 1966 (age 60)
- Place of birth: Khaznidon, North Ossetia, Russian SFSR
- Height: 1.80 m (5 ft 11 in)
- Position: Midfielder

Senior career*
Years	Team	Apps	(Gls)
1983–1989	FC Spartak Ordzhonikidze	107	(10)
1990	FC Spartak Moscow	4	(0)
1991–1994	FC Spartak Vladikavkaz	92	(7)
1995	FC Lokomotiv Nizhny Novgorod	13	(0)
1995	FC Lokomotiv St. Petersburg	11	(2)
1996–1998	PFC Spartak Nalchik	62	(4)

Managerial career
- 2005: FC Alania Vladikavkaz (reserves assistant)
- 2006: FC Avtodor Vladikavkaz
- 2007: FC Avtodor Vladikavkaz
- 2013: FC Torpedo Armavir
- 2016–2017: FC Spartak Vladikavkaz
- * Club domestic league appearances and goals

Marat Azikhanovich Dzoblayev (Russian: Марат Азиханович Дзоблаев; born 1 September 1966) is a Russian professional football coach and a former player.

He made his professional debut in the Soviet Second League in 1983 for FC Spartak Ordzhonikidze. He played 2 games in the UEFA Cup 1993–94 for FC Spartak Vladikavkaz.

== Honours ==
- Russian Premier League runner-up: 1992.
