= Dzambolat Khastsayev =

Russian footballer

Personal information
- Full name: Dzambolat Valeryevich Khastsayev
- Date of birth: 22 February 1995 (age 31)
- Place of birth: Vladikavkaz, Russia
- Height: 1.83 m (6 ft 0 in)
- Position: Forward

Team information
- Current team: FC Igilik

Youth career
- FC Spartak Moscow

Senior career*
Years	Team	Apps	(Gls)
2011–2013	FC Alania Vladikavkaz	3	(0)
2013–2014	FC Alania-d Vladikavkaz	28	(13)
2014	FC Chernomorets Novorossiysk	9	(1)
2015	FC Dynamo GTS Stavropol	14	(4)
2015–2016	FC Chernomorets Novorossiysk	22	(1)
2016	FC Dynamo Stavropol	13	(2)
2017–2019	FC Spartak Vladikavkaz	54	(8)
2019–2020	FC Van	13	(5)
2020–2022	FC Gvardeyets Skvortsovo		
2022	FC Metallurg Vidnoye	9	(2)
2022–	FC Igilik	12	(1)

International career
2010	Russia U-15	2	(0)
2010	Russia U-16	5	(1)
- * Club domestic league appearances and goals as of 5 November 2022

Dzambolat Valeryevich Khastsayev (Russian: Дзамболат Валерьевич Хасцаев; born 22 February 1995) is a Russian professional football player who plays for Kazakhstani club FC Igilik.

== Club career ==
He made his debut in the Russian Premier League on 26 May 2013 for FC Spartak Vladikavkaz in a game against FC Spartak Moscow.
