= Ivan Larin =

Soviet Russian football coach (1926–1986)

Personal information
- Full name: Ivan Vasilyevich Larin
- Date of birth: 7 January 1926
- Date of death: 1 November 1986 (aged 60)
- Positions: Midfielder; forward

Senior career*
Years	Team	Apps	(Gls)
1953	FC VMS Moscow		

Managerial career
- 1968–1969: Energetik Dushanbe
- 1973: Spartak Ordzhonikidze
- 1976–1978: Uralan Elista
- * Club domestic league appearances and goals

Ivan Vasilyevich Larin (Russian: Иван Васильевич Ларин; 7 January 1926 – 1 November 1986) was a Soviet and Russian football player and coach. He died in November 1986 at the age of 60.
