= Vladimir Gazzayev =

Russian footballer

Vladimir Gazzaev
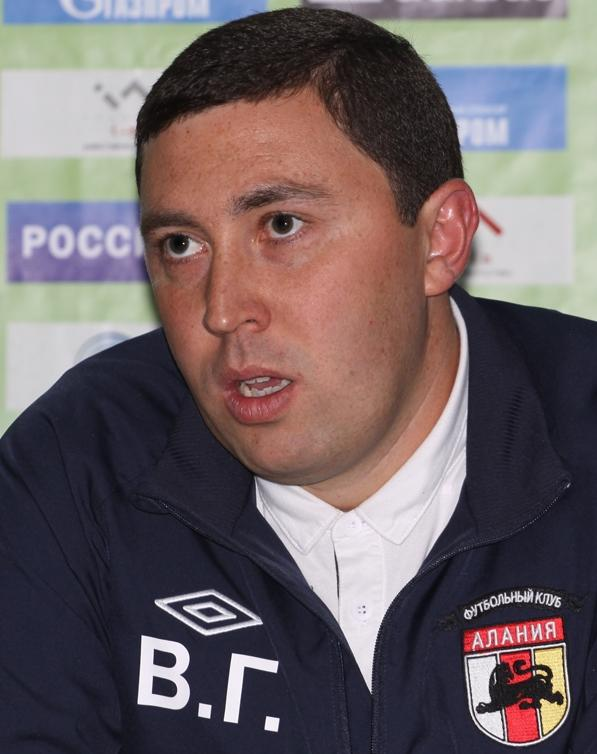
- Coaching Alania in 2012

Personal information
- Full name: Vladimir Valeryevich Gazzaev
- Date of birth: 1 July 1980 (age 46)
- Place of birth: Ordzhonikidze, Russian SFSR
- Height: 1.76 m (5 ft 9 in)
- Position: Striker

Senior career*
Years	Team	Apps	(Gls)
1997	Alania-d Vladikavkaz	19	(1)
1998	Alania-2 Vladikavkaz	31	(2)

Managerial career
- 2009–2010: Alania Vladikavkaz (assistant)
- 2011–2012: Alania Vladikavkaz
- 2013–2014: Alania Vladikavkaz
- 2014–2015: Aktobe
- 2018: Rustavi
- 2018: Urozhay Krasnodar
- 2019: Tobol
- 2021: Siena (assistant)
- 2022: Turan
- 2024: Rodina Moscow
- * Club domestic league appearances and goals

Vladimir Valeryevich Gazzayev (Russian: Владимир Валерьевич Газзаев; born 1 July 1980) is a Russian professional football coach and a former player.

== Coaching career ==
From 2014 to 2015 he worked with the Kazakhstan Premier League club FC Aktobe.

From 26 June to 18 July 2018, Vladimir Gazzayev was the head coach of the new FC Urozhay Krasnodar.

On 31 December 2018, Gazzayev was appointed as the new manager of FC Tobol.

== Personal life ==
He is the son of Valery Gazzaev.

== Honours ==
Alania

- Russian National Football League: champions 2011–12
