= Valeri Ovchinnikov =

Russian football and coach

Personal information
- Full name: Valeri Viktorovich Ovchinnikov
- Date of birth: 26 November 1947 (age 78)
- Place of birth: Leonidovo, Russian SFSR
- Position: Goalkeeper

Team information
- Current team: Sillamäe Kalev (advisor)

Senior career*
Years	Team	Apps	(Gls)
- Dünamo Tallinn

Managerial career
- 1976–1977: Azeri Tallinn
- 1979–1982: Dynamo Kirov
- 1984: Geolog Tyumen
- 1985–1986: Spartak Ordzhonikidze
- 1986–1988: Sport Tallinn
- 1989–2000: Lokomotiv Nizhny Novgorod
- 1994–2001: Lokomotiv Nizhny Novgorod (president)
- 2000–2001: Lokomotiv Nizhny Novgorod
- 2002–2003: Volgar-Gazprom Astrakhan
- 2003: Sodovik Sterlitamak
- 2004: Lukoil Chelyabinsk
- 2011–: Sillamäe Kalev (advisor)
- * Club domestic league appearances and goals

Valeri Viktorovich Ovchinnikov (Russian: Валерий Викторович Овчинников; born 26 November 1947) is a Russian professional football coach. He works as an advisor for the Estonian club Sillamäe Kalev.
