= Nikolai Khudiyev =

Russian footballer and coach

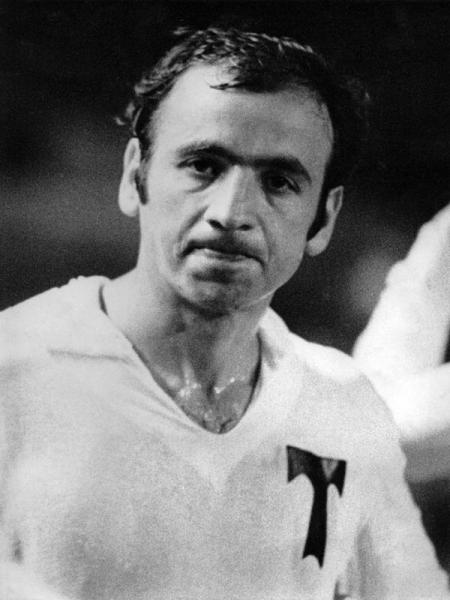

Personal information
- Full name: Nikolai Uruzmakovich Khudiyev
- Date of birth: 15 May 1949 (age 77)
- Place of birth: Dzaudzhikau, Russian SFSR
- Height: 1.78 m (5 ft 10 in)
- Position: Defender

Senior career*
Years	Team	Apps	(Gls)
1967–1973	FC Spartak Ordzhonikidze	214	(7)
1974	FC Torpedo Moscow	30	(0)
1975	PFC CSKA Moscow	23	(0)
1976–1977	FC Torpedo Moscow	50	(0)
1978	FC Lokomotiv Moscow	24	(1)
1979–1983	FC Spartak Ordzhonikidze	169	(1)

Managerial career
- 1988–1989: Étoile du Sahel
- 1990–1991: FC Spartak Vladikavkaz (assistant)
- 1991: FC Spartak Vladikavkaz
- 1992: FC Asmaral Moscow (assistant)
- 1993: FC Asmaral Moscow
- 1996–1998: FC Lokomotiv-2 Moscow (assistant)
- 1998–2002: FC Lokomotiv Moscow (assistant)
- 2003: FC Spartak-Alania Vladikavkaz
- 2003: FC Spartak-Alania Vladikavkaz (assistant)
- 2004–2005: FC Alania Vladikavkaz (sportive director)
- * Club domestic league appearances and goals

Nikolai Uruzmakovich Khudiyev (Russian: Николай Урузманович Худиев; born 15 May 1949) is a Russian professional football coach and a former player.
