= Gennadi Styopushkin =

Russian footballer and coach

Gennadi Styopushkin Геннадий Стёпушкин
Personal information
- Full name: Gennadi Nikolayevich Styopushkin
- Date of birth: 2 June 1964 (age 62)
- Place of birth: Oryol, Russian SFSR
- Height: 1.82 m (6 ft 0 in)
- Positions: Defender; midfielder

Youth career
- DYuSSh-1 Oryol
- ROShISP-10 Rostov-on-Don

Senior career*
Years	Team	Apps	(Gls)
1981	SKA Rostov-on-Don	0	(0)
1981–1982	Rostselmash Rostov-on-Don	37	(2)
1983–1984	SKA Rostov-on-Don	10	(0)
1985	Dnipro Dnipropetrovsk	0	(0)
1985–1987	Rostselmash Rostov-on-Don	105	(16)
1988–1989	SKA Rostov-on-Don	58	(5)
1990–1993	Rostselmash Rostov-on-Don	77	(6)
1994	Maccabi Yavne	16	(3)
1995	Arminia Bielefeld	4	(0)
1995–1996	Ilhwa Chunma	42	(1)
1997	Anyang LG Cheetahs	0	(0)
1997–1998	Chernomorets Novorossiysk	40	(1)
1999–2000	Rostselmash Rostov-on-Don	20	(0)

Managerial career
- 2001–2004: Rostov (assistant)
- 2005: Rostov
- 2005: Rostov (assistant)
- 2005: Rostov
- 2006: SKA Rostov-on-Don (scout)
- 2006–2008: SKA Rostov-on-Don
- 2009: Metallurg Lipetsk
- 2011–2014: Rostov (assistant)
- 2017–2018: Rostov (scout)
- 2018–2019: SKA Rostov-on-Don
- * Club domestic league appearances and goals

Gennadi Nikolayevich Styopushkin (Russian: Геннадий Николаевич Стёпушкин; born 2 June 1964) is a Russian professional football coach and a former player.

== Club career ==
As a player, he made his debut in the Soviet Second League in 1981 for Rostselmash Rostov-on-Don. In 1997, he played for Seongnam and Seoul of the South Korean K League, then known as Ilhwa Chunam and Anyang LG Cheetahs. In Seoul, he appeared only in League Cup 4 matches.
