= Andrei Zazroyev =

Soviet-Georgian footballer

Personal information
- Full name: Andrei Andreyevich Zazroyev
- Date of birth: 21 October 1925
- Place of birth: Tbilisi, Georgian SSR
- Date of death: 16 March 1987 (aged 61)
- Place of death: Russia
- Height: 1.74 m (5 ft 8 1/2 in)
- Positions: Midfielder; forward

Team information
- Current team: Dynamo Tbilisi

Senior career*
Years	Team	Apps	(Gls)
1946	Krylya Sovetov Perm	20	(9)
1948–1951	Dynamo Tbilisi	66	(31)
1952–1955	Dynamo Kyiv	72	(28)
1956–1957	Dynamo Tbilisi	17	(5)

Managerial career
- 1959: Dynamo Tbilisi (assistant)
- 1968–1970: FC Spartak Ordzhonikidze
- 1970: Spartak Ordzhonikidze (director)
- 1971: Dila Gori
- 1972: Spartak Ordzhonikidze
- 1977: Spartak Tbilisi
- 1980–1981: Spartak Ordzhonikidze
- * Club domestic league appearances and goals

Andrey Ivanovich Zazroyev (Zazroshvili) (Georgian: ანდრო ივანეს ძე ზაზროევი (ზაზროშვილი); Russian: Андрей Иванович Зазроев (Зазрошвили); 21 October 1925 – 10 September 1986) was a Soviet and Georgian football player and manager.

Zazroyev was born in Tbilisi. He played for Dynamo Tbilisi, Krylya Sovetov Perm and Dynamo Kyiv as forward. After finishing his playing career he became a successful manager who coached Dynamo Tbilisi, Spartak Ordzhonikidze, Dila Gori and Spartak Tbilisi.

== Honours ==
=== As player ===
Soviet Top League

- runner-up: 1951, 1952
- 3rd place: 1950

Soviet Cup

- winner: 1954

=== As manager ===
- 1969 Soviet First League with Spartak Ordzhonikidze
