= Dmitri Chikhradze =

Soviet footballer

Personal information
- Full name: Dmitri Georgiyevich Chikhradze
- Date of birth: 25 December 1922
- Place of birth: Gomi, Oni Municipality, Georgian SSR
- Date of death: 5 May 1979 (aged 56)
- Place of death: Nalchik, Russian SFSR
- Positions: Forward; midfielder

Senior career*
Years	Team	Apps	(Gls)
1946	FC Dynamo Nalchik		
1947–1952	FC VMS Moscow		
1952	PFC Spartak Nalchik		
1952	FC Balti laevastik Tallinn		
1953–1954	PFC Spartak Nalchik		
1955–1956	FC Khimik Pyatigorsk		
1956	FC Stavropol Krai		

Managerial career
- 1953–1954: PFC Spartak Nalchik
- 1956: FC Stavropol Krai
- 1956: FC Khimik Pyatigorsk
- 1957: FC Trudovye Rezervy Stavropol (assistant)
- 1957: FC Trudovye Rezervy Stavropol
- 1958: FC Spartak Stavropol (assistant)
- 1960: FC Spartak Kislovodsk
- 1961: FC Spartak Stavropol
- 1962–1963: FC Dynamo Stavropol
- 1964–1965: PFC Spartak Nalchik
- 1966: PFC Spartak Nalchik (team director)
- 1967: FC Spartak Kislovodsk
- 1969: FC Khimik Nevinnomyssk
- 1969: FC Mashuk Pyatigorsk
- 1971: FC Spartak Ordzhonikidze
- 1972: FC Avtomobilist Nalchik
- 1973: PFC Spartak Nalchik
- 1975: FC Uralan Elista
- * Club domestic league appearances and goals

Dmitri Georgiyevich Chikhradze (Russian: Дмитрий Георгиевич Чихрадзе; Georgian: დიმიტრი ჩიხრაძე; 25 December 1922 in Gomi – 5 May 1979 in Nalchik) was a Soviet Georgian football player and coach.
