= Sergei Korshunov =

Soviet footballer (1928–1982)

Personal information
- Full name: Sergei Aleksandrovich Korshunov
- Date of birth: 8 October 1928
- Place of birth: Moscow, Soviet Union
- Date of death: 12 December 1982 (aged 54)
- Place of death: Moscow, Soviet Union
- Height: 1.75 m (5 ft 9 in)
- Position: Forward

Senior career*
Years	Team	Apps	(Gls)
1946–1948	FC Krylya Sovetov Moscow	57	(12)
1949–1952	VVS Moscow	94	(43)
1953	FC MVO Moscow	4	(2)
1953	FC Dynamo Moscow	13	(4)
1954	FC CDKA Moscow	18	(4)
1955–1956	FC Spartak Moscow	8	(4)
1956–1957	FC Dynamo Kyiv	26	(8)
1958–1960	FC Metalurh Zaporizhia	72	(24)

International career
1956	Ukraine	4	(1)

Managerial career
- 1959–1963: FC Metalurh Zaporizhia
- 1963: FC Lokomotiv Gomel
- 1964–1965: FC Karpaty Lviv
- 1966: FC Desna Chernihiv
- 1967–1969: FC Metalurh Zaporizhia
- 1970: FC Stroitel Ashkhabat
- 1971: FC Spartak Ordzhonikidze
- 1973–1976: FC Daugava Riga
- 1973–1979: USSR (under-18)
- 1981–1982: USSR B-squad
- * Club domestic league appearances and goals

Sergei Aleksandrovich Korshunov (Russian: Сергей Александрович Коршунов; 8 October 1928 – 12 December 1982) was an association footballer from the former Soviet Union who played for FC Dynamo Kyiv and Moscow teams.

In 1956 Korshunov played couple of games for Ukraine at the Spartakiad of the Peoples of the USSR.
