= Batraz Gurtsiyev =

Russian footballer (born 1998)

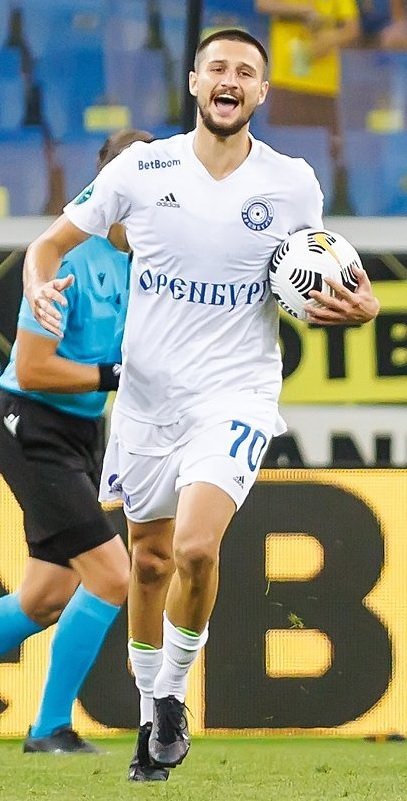
- Gurtsiyev with Orenburg in 2022

Personal information
- Full name: Batraz Olegovich Gurtsiyev
- Date of birth: 12 December 1998 (age 27)
- Place of birth: Vladikavkaz, Russia
- Height: 1.81 m (5 ft 11 in)
- Position: Right midfielder

Team information
- Current team: Alania Vladikavkaz
- Number: 7

Youth career
- 2015–2016: Krasnodar

Senior career*
Years	Team	Apps	(Gls)
2016–2018	Spartak Vladikavkaz	40	(10)
2018–2020	Chayka Peschanokopskoye	9	(0)
2019–2020	→ Alania Vladikavkaz (loan)	13	(8)
2020–2022	Alania Vladikavkaz	76	(24)
2022–2025	Orenburg	8	(0)
2023–2025	→ Alania Vladikavkaz (loan)	53	(12)
2025	→ Sokol Saratov (loan)	12	(4)
2025–2026	SKA-Khabarovsk	13	(2)
2026	Sokol Saratov	9	(0)
2026–	Alania Vladikavkaz	17	(3)
- * Club domestic league appearances and goals as of 15 November 2026

Batraz Olegovich Gurtsiyev (Russian: Батраз Олегович Гурциев; born 12 December 1998) is a Russian football player who plays for Alania Vladikavkaz. He is most often deployed as right midfielder, and is also used in other positions such as centre-forward or winger. He is a South Ossetia international.

== Club career ==
He made his debut in the Russian Football National League for Alania Vladikavkaz on 1 August 2020 in a game against SKA-Khabarovsk, as a starter.

On 8 July 2022, Gurtsiyev signed with Russian Premier League club Orenburg. He made his RPL debut for Orenburg on 23 July 2022 against Ural Yekaterinburg. On 28 January 2023, Gurtsiyev returned to Alania Vladikavkaz on loan with an option to buy. On 20 June 2023, the loan was extended for the 2023–24 season. On 22 January 2025, Gurtsiyev moved to Sokol Saratov.

== Career statistics ==
=== Club ===
As of 27 November 2022

Club	Season	League			Cup		Continental		Total	
Club	Season	Division	Apps	Goals	Apps	Goals	Apps	Goals	Apps	Goals
Spartak Vladikavkaz	2016–17	Second League	13	5	–		–		13	5
Spartak Vladikavkaz	2017–18	Second League	27	5	1	0	–		28	5
Spartak Vladikavkaz	Total		40	10	1	0	0	0	41	10
Chayka Peschanokopskoye	2018–19	Second League	9	0	1	0	–		10	0
Alania Vladikavkaz	2019–20	Second League	13	8	3	2	–		16	10
Alania Vladikavkaz	2020–21	First League	40	13	1	1	–		41	14
Alania Vladikavkaz	2021–22	First League	36	11	5	1	–		41	12
Alania Vladikavkaz	Total		89	32	9	4	0	0	98	36
Orenburg	2022–23	RPL	8	0	4	0	–		12	0
Career total			146	42	15	4	0	0	161	46
