= Igor Zazroyev =

Russian footballer and coach

Personal information
- Full name: Igor Andreyevich Zazroyev
- Date of birth: 23 October 1948 (age 78)
- Place of birth: Tbilisi, Georgian SSR
- Height: 1.70 m (5 ft 7 in)
- Positions: Midfielder; striker

Senior career*
Years	Team	Apps	(Gls)
1967–1974	FC Spartak Ordzhonikidze	215	(28)
1975	FC SKA Rostov-on-Don	2	(0)
1976	FC Terek Grozny	33	(5)
1977	FC SKA Rostov-on-Don	0	(0)
1977–1981	FC Spartak Ordzhonikidze	162	(24)

Managerial career
- 1980: FC Spartak Ordzhonikidze (director)
- 1983: FC Spartak Ordzhonikidze (assistant)
- 1985: FC Spartak Ordzhonikidze (assistant)
- 1986: FC Spartak Ordzhonikidze (director)
- 1986–1987: FC Spartak Ordzhonikidze
- 1988–1990: FC Uralan Elista
- 1991–1992: FC Spartak Anapa (director)
- 1996–1997: FC Spartak Anapa
- 2001: FC Alania Vladikavkaz (reserves)
- 2001: FC Alania Vladikavkaz (scout)
- 2002: FC Alania Vladikavkaz (reserves assistant)
- 2003: FC Spartak-Alania Vladikavkaz (reserves)
- 2010–2011: FC Mashuk-KMV Pyatigorsk
- * Club domestic league appearances and goals

Igor Andreyevich Zazroyev (Russian: Игорь Андреевич Зазроев; born 23 October 1948) is a Russian professional football coach and a former player.
