= Aslanbek Sikoyev =

Russian footballer

Personal information
- Full name: Aslanbek Chermenovich Sikoyev
- Date of birth: 11 March 1995 (age 31)
- Place of birth: Vladikavkaz, North Ossetia-Alania, Russia
- Height: 1.88 m (6 ft 2 in)
- Position: Forward

Youth career
- 2012–2014: Rubin Kazan

Senior career*
Years	Team	Apps	(Gls)
2015	Vityaz Podolsk	3	(0)
2016	Alania Vladikavkaz	9	(7)
2017–2018	Arsenal Tula	4	(0)
2017	→ Arsenal-2 Tula	8	(5)
2019	Dnyapro Mogilev	0	(0)
2020	Krymteplytsia Molodizhne	7	(7)
2021	Shinnik Yaroslavl	7	(0)
2021	Gvardeyets Skvortsovo	9	(10)
2022	Zhetysu	10	(2)
2022	KAMAZ	7	(1)
- * Club domestic league appearances and goals

Aslanbek Chermenovich Sikoyev (Russian: Асланбек Черменович Сикоев; born 11 March 1995) is a Russian former professional footballer who played as a forward.

== Club career ==
He made his debut in the Russian Professional Football League for FC Vityaz Podolsk on 24 April 2015 in a game against FC Tambov.

He made his debut in the Russian Premier League for FC Arsenal Tula on 18 July 2017 in a game against FC Lokomotiv Moscow.

== Career statistics ==
=== Club ===
As of 13 May 2018

Club	Season	League			Cup		Continental		Total	
Club	Season	Division	Apps	Goals	Apps	Goals	Apps	Goals	Apps	Goals
Rubin Kazan	2012–13	Russian Premier League	0	0	0	0	0	0	0	0
Rubin Kazan	2013–14	Russian Premier League	0	0	0	0	0	0	0	0
Rubin Kazan	Total		0	0	0	0	0	0	0	0
Vityaz Podolsk	2014–15	PFL	3	0	–		–		3	0
Alania Vladikavkaz	2015–16	PFL	9	7	–		–		9	7
Arsenal-2 Tula	2016–17	PFL	8	5	–		–		8	5
Arsenal Tula	2016–17	Russian Premier League	0	0	0	0	–		0	0
Arsenal Tula	2017–18	Russian Premier League	4	0	0	0	–		4	0
Arsenal Tula	Total		4	0	0	0	0	0	4	0
Career total			24	12	0	0	0	0	24	12
