= Aleksandr Kochetkov =

Russian footballer and coach (1933–2015)

Personal information
- Full name: Aleksandr Petrovich Kochetkov
- Date of birth: 28 October 1933
- Place of birth: Moscow, Russian SFSR, Soviet Union
- Date of death: 1 July 2015 (aged 81)
- Place of death: Moscow, Russia
- Position: Forward

Youth career
- FC Spartak Moscow

Senior career*
Years	Team	Apps	(Gls)
1957–1960	FC SKA Khabarovsk	100	(19)
1961–1963	FC Luch Vladivostok	3	(1)

Managerial career
- 1961–1962: FC Luch Vladivostok (assistant)
- 1963–1966: FC Luch Vladivostok
- 1967: FC Luch Vladivostok (assistant)
- 1967–1968: FC Luch Vladivostok
- 1969: FC Luch Vladivostok (team director)
- 1969: FC Luch Vladivostok
- 1969: FC Luch Vladivostok (assistant)
- 1970: FC Khimik Dzerzhinsk
- 1971–1972: FC Amur Blagoveshchensk
- 1972: FC Alga Frunze
- 1975–1979: FC Pakhtakor
- 1979–1981: FC Spartak Moscow (academy director)
- 1981–1982: FC Spartak Ordzhonikidze
- 1983–1985: FC Kuban Krasnodar
- 1989–1990: FC Sokol Saratov
- * Club domestic league appearances and goals

Aleksandr Petrovich Kochetkov (Russian: Александр Петрович Кочетков; 28 October 1933 – 1 July 2015) was a Russian football player and coach.

== Career ==
Born in Moscow, Kochetkov played professional football for SKA Khabarovsk and Luch Vladivostok. After he retired from playing, Kochetkov became a football manager. He led Amur Blagoveshchensk to its first Russian Second Division championship in 1971.

== Death ==
Kochetkov died in July 2015.
