= Valery Petrakov =

Russian footballer

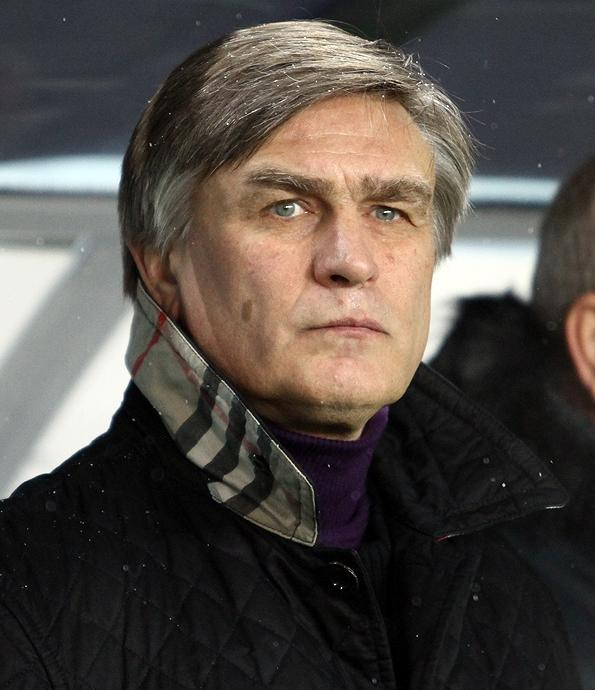
- Petrakov coaching Khimki in 2012

Personal information
- Full name: Valery Yuryevich Petrakov
- Date of birth: 16 May 1958 (age 68)
- Place of birth: Bryansk, USSR
- Height: 1.80 m (5 ft 11 in)
- Position: Striker

Youth career
- FC Dynamo Bryansk

Senior career*
Years	Team	Apps	(Gls)
1975–1976	FC Dynamo Bryansk	29	(1)
1976–1980	FC Lokomotiv Moscow	107	(36)
1981–1985	FC Torpedo Moscow	122	(33)
1986	FC Lokomotiv Moscow	23	(2)
1987–1989	BSG Einheit Wernigerode (East Germany)		(21)
1989–1990	Motor Nordhausen		(10)
1990–1991	IFK Luleå		(4)
1992	Notvikens IK (Sweden)	21	(10)

International career
1978	USSR	2	(1)

Managerial career
- 1997: FC Torpedo-Luzhniki-d
- 1997–2001: FC Torpedo Moscow (assistant)
- 2001–2003: FC Tom Tomsk
- 2003–2005: FC Moscow
- 2005: FC Rostov (caretaker)
- 2005–2008: FC Tom Tomsk
- 2009: FC Alania Vladikavkaz
- 2011–2012: FC Dynamo Bryansk
- 2012–2013: FC Khimki
- 2014: FC Torpedo Moscow (U-21)
- 2014–2016: FC Torpedo Moscow
- 2016–2018: FC Tom Tomsk
- 2019–2020: FC Luch Vladivostok
- 2021–2022: FC Zvezda Perm
- 2022–2024: FC Irtysh Omsk
- * Club domestic league appearances and goals

Valery Yuryevich Petrakov (Russian: Валерий Юрьевич Петраков, born 16 May 1958) is a Russian soccer manager and a former striker.

== Playing career ==
In 1975, at the age of 17, Petrakov began his career with his local team, FC Dynamo Bryansk. In 1976, he transferred to FC Lokomotiv Moscow where he would play for four seasons. He played for FC Torpedo Moscow from 1981 to 1985 and returned to Lokomotiv Moscow for one more season in 1986.

Petrakov spent his final six years abroad with FSV Wacker 90 Nordhausen in Germany and then with IFK Luleå in Sweden before retiring to coaching. His playing career included two caps and one goal for the Soviet National Team. He was a member of the 1977 FIFA World Youth Championship champion as well as the 1980 European Youth Championship winner. In 1986, he played on Lokomotiv's successful Soviet Cup squad.

== Coaching career ==
Immediately after retirement, he was appointed as manager for IFK Luleå, where he finished his playing career. In 1995, he returned to Russia to head another former club, Torpedo Moscow. While he did not win any championships at Torpedo, his clubs appeared in the UEFA Cup in 1996-1997 and 2000–2001. His club also appeared in the 1997 Intertoto Cup.

In 2001, he moved to Tomsk which played in the Russian First Division at the time. Failing to achieve promotion there, he returned to the Russian Premier League with FC Moscow. He had a brief, unsuccessful stint with FC Rostov in 2005 where he was dismissed after four matches.

He returned to Tomsk for the 2006 season and achieved an 8th-place finish. He signs a contract as the new head coach from FC Alania Vladikavkaz on 4 December 2008.

On 11 November 2019, he joined FC Luch Vladivostok.

== Personal life ==
His son Yuri Petrakov is now a professional footballer.
