= Dzhambulad Bazayev =

Russian Ossetian footballer

Personal information
- Full name: Dzhambulad Vasilyevich Bazayev
- Date of birth: 18 August 1979 (age 47)
- Place of birth: Rustavi, Georgian SSR, Soviet Union
- Height: 1.81 m (5 ft 11 in)
- Position: Midfielder

Senior career*
Years	Team	Apps	(Gls)
1996	FC Mozdok	16	(5)
1997–2002	FC Alania Vladikavkaz	99	(13)
2002	FC Zenit Saint Petersburg	7	(2)
2003–2004	FC Saturn Moscow Oblast	39	(4)
2005	FC Alania Vladikavkaz	28	(9)
2006–2007	FC Rubin Kazan	17	(1)
2007–2012	FC Alania Vladikavkaz	89	(19)

International career
2000–2001	Russia U-21	8	(3)
- * Club domestic league appearances and goals as of 11:46, 31 May 2012 (UTC)

Dzhambulad Vasilyevich Bazayev (Russian: Джамбулад Васильевич Базаев; born 18 August 1979) is a retired Russian Ossetian footballer who played as a midfielder.
