= Vladimir Shevchuk =

Russian footballer

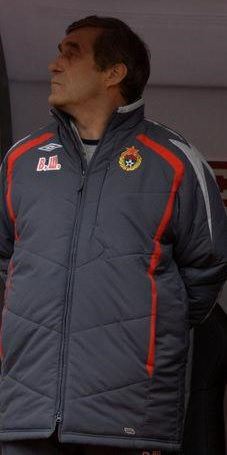
- Vladimir Shevchuk in 2007

Personal information
- Full name: Vladimir Mikhailovich Shevchuk
- Date of birth: 9 May 1954 (age 72)
- Place of birth: Magnitogorsk, Russian SFSR
- Height: 1.80 m (5 ft 11 in)
- Positions: Midfielder; forward

Youth career
- Metallurg Cherepovets
- Metallurg Zhdanov

Senior career*
Years	Team	Apps	(Gls)
1971	Metallurg Zhdanov	0	(0)
1971–1973	Shakhtar Donetsk	8	(0)
1973–1975	Lokomotiv Zhdanov	38	(25)
1975	Traktor Pavlodar	0	(0)
1976–1977	Kairat	64	(11)
1978–1979	Lokomotiv Moscow	41	(5)
1980–1981	Dnipro Dnipropetrovsk	53	(16)
1981–1982	Kolos Nikopol	46	(6)
1983–1984	Lokomotiv Moscow	73	(13)
1985–1988	Kolkheti Poti	107	(57)
1992	Neftekhimik Nizhnekamsk	16	(4)

Managerial career
- 1992: Neftekhimik Nizhnekamsk (assistant)
- 1995–1997: Saturn Ramenskoye (assistant)
- 1997: Saturn Ramenskoye
- 1999–2000: Saturn Ramenskoye (assistant)
- 2001–2002: Saturn-RenTV Ramenskoye
- 2003: Sokol Saratov
- 2004: Khimki
- 2005: CSKA Moscow (assistant)
- 2005: Saturn Ramenskoye
- 2006–2007: CSKA Moscow (assistant)
- 2008: CSKA Moscow (reserves)
- 2009–2010: Dynamo Kyiv (assistant)
- 2010–2011: Alania Vladikavkaz
- 2011–2013: Alania Vladikavkaz (assistant)
- 2018: Urozhay Krasnodar (assistant)
- 2022: Turan (conditioning)
- * Club domestic league appearances and goals

Vladimir Mikhailovich Shevchuk (Russian: Владимир Михайлович Шевчук; born 9 May 1954) is a Russian professional football coach and a former player.

== Coaching career ==
From 26 June to 18 July 2018, Vladimir was an assistant manager with Urozhay Krasnodar.
