= Yuri Sekinayev =

Russian footballer and coach

Personal information
- Full name: Yuri Galauyevich Sekinayev
- Date of birth: 17 April 1962 (age 64)
- Place of birth: Ordzhonikidze, Russian SFSR
- Height: 1.78 m (5 ft 10 in)
- Positions: Midfielder; striker

Senior career*
| Years | Team | Apps | (Gls) |
| 1980–1985 | FC Spartak Ordzhonikidze | 208 | (32) |
| 1986–1989 | FC Chornomorets Odesa | 92 | (10) |
| 1990 | FC Spartak Moscow | 1 | (0) |
| 1990–1991 | ZVL Žilina | | |
| 1991–1994 | Türkiyemspor Berlin | 54 | (2) |
| 1995–1996 | Spandauer SV | 34 | (2) |
| 1996–1998 | TuS Makkabi Berlin | | |

Managerial career
- 1996–1999: TuS Makkabi Berlin
- 2002: FC Alania Vladikavkaz (assistant)
- 2004: FC Alania Vladikavkaz (caretaker)
- 2016–2018: FC Spartak Vladikavkaz (director)
- * Club domestic league appearances and goals

Yuri Galauyevich Sekinayev (Russian: Юрий Галауевич Секинаев; born 17 April 1962) is a Russian professional football coach and a former player.
