= Valery Gazzaev =

Russian footballer and manager

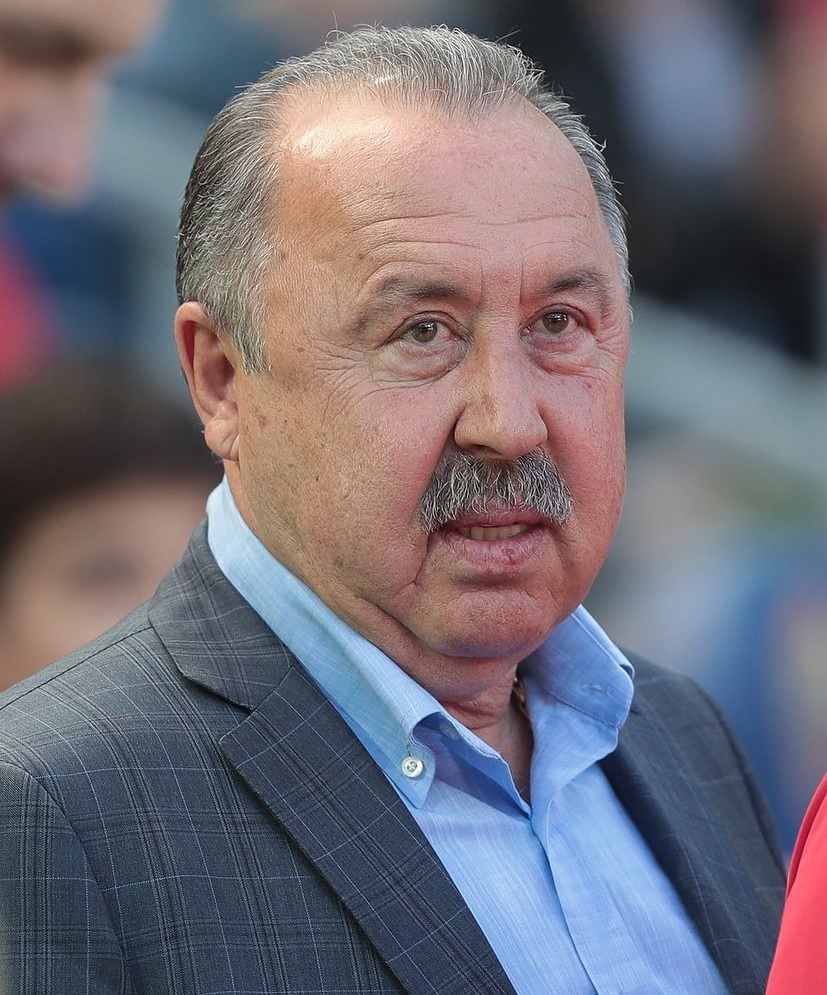
- Gazzaev in 2019

Personal information
- Full name: Valery Georgiyevich Gazzaev
- Date of birth: 7 August 1954 (age 72)
- Place of birth: Ordzhonikidze, Russian SFSR, Soviet Union
- Height: 1.73 m (5 ft 8 in)
- Position: Striker

Youth career
- 1966–1969: Spartak Ordzhonikidze

Senior career*
Years	Team	Apps	(Gls)
1970–1973	Spartak Ordzhonikidze	53	(9)
1974	SKA Rostov-on-Don	12	(1)
1975	Spartak Ordzhonikidze	33	(14)
1976–1978	Lokomotiv Moscow	72	(14)
1979–1985	Dynamo Moscow	197	(70)
1986	Dinamo Tbilisi	14	(5)
Total		381	(113)

International career
1978–1980	USSR	8	(4)
1980–1983	USSR (Olympic)	11	(2)

Managerial career
- 1989–1991: Spartak Ordzhonikidze
- 1991–1993: Dynamo Moscow
- 1994–1999: Alania Vladikavkaz
- 1999–2001: Dynamo Moscow
- 2001–2003: CSKA Moscow
- 2001–2002: Russia U21
- 2002–2003: Russia
- 2004–2008: CSKA Moscow
- 2009–2010: Dynamo Kyiv
- 2011–2014: Alania Vladikavkaz (president)
- 2012–2013: Alania Vladikavkaz (president and manager)
Medal record
Representing Soviet Union
Men's Football
Bronze medal – third place	1980 Moscow	Team competition
- * Club domestic league appearances and goals

Valery Georgiyevich Gazzaev (Russian: Вале́рий Гео́ргиевич Газза́ев; Iron Ossetic: Гæззаты Георгийы фырт Валери, romanized: Gæzzaty Georgijy fyrt Valeri; born 7 August 1954) is a Russian politician, football manager and former footballer of Ossetian descent. As a Soviet footballer he played the position of a striker enjoying successes with his team FC Dynamo Moscow as well as the USSR national football team in the Olympics.

Gazzaev became a coach in 1989. He was most successful when he was in charge in CSKA Moscow from 2004 to 2008. There Gazzaev won every possible Russian title three times each, as well as the 2005 UEFA Cup. He is considered one of the best football coaches to have emerged from the former Soviet Union because of these achievements.

== Playing career ==
=== Soviet First League ===
Gazzaev was born 7 August 1954 in Ordzhonikidze, Russian SFSR, now Vladikavkaz, Russia. He started his playing career as a forward for his native Spartak Ordzhonikidze in the Soviet First League. In 1974, he moved to SKA Rostov-on-Don, which got promoted from the Soviet First League to the Soviet Top League after a second-place finish at the end of the season. However, Gazzaev was left behind in the first league in Spartak Ordzhonikidze, as he wasn't one of the main players of the SKA Rostov-on-Don.

=== Soviet Top League ===
In the Soviet Top League, Gazzaev played in Lokomotiv Moscow, Dynamo Moscow, and Dinamo Tbilisi.

Gazzaev is a Soviet Cup winner with Dynamo Moscow in 1984. During his career he scored 89 goals in 283 matches in Soviet Top League, and was the top goal scorer of the UEFA Cup Winners' Cup 1984–85.

== International career ==
He became the under-23 European champion with USSR in 1976 and under-21 European champion in 1980. He also won the bronze medal with USSR at the Summer Olympics in Moscow.

== Coaching career ==
After finishing his playing career in 1986 Gazzaev coached the youth team of Dynamo Moscow before moving to work with professional clubs. His first major success as a manager was winning the Russian championship with Spartak-Alania Vladikavkaz in 1995.

More titles followed after Gazzaev moved to coach CSKA Moscow. With them he won the 2004–05 UEFA Cup, as well as the Russian Premier League in 2003, 2005 and 2006 and the Russian Cup in 2002, 2005, and 2006, on 5 December 2008 left PFC CSKA Moscow. Gazzaev's CSKA Moscow team was the first side from the Russian Federation to win a European competition since the fall of the Soviet Union.

On 26 May 2009, the former CSKA Moscow coach was named as the new head coach of Dynamo Kyiv, who signed a three years contract also until 2012.

After a spell as Dynamo Kyiv head coach he returned to Vladikavkaz and became president (2011) and then also manager (November 2012) of Alania Vladikavkaz. In February 2014, the football club "Alania", led by Gazzaev, ceased to exist and pulled out of the 2013–14 Russia First Division, due to financial liquidation and sponsorship problems, and the club was dissolved.

== Managerial statistics ==
Team	Nat	From	To	Record				
Team	Nat	From	To	G	W	D	L	Win %
Spartak Ordzonikidze	(Soviet Union)	1 January 1989	2 April 1991	86	36	22	28	41.86
Dynamo Moscow	(Soviet Union) (Russia)	3 April 1991	15 September 1993	106	59	22	25	55.66
Alania Vladikavkaz	(Russia)	1 January 1994	31 December 1999	215	103	45	67	47.91
Dynamo Moscow	(Russia)	1 January 2000	16 April 2001	40	17	9	14	42.50
Russia U-21	(Russia)	15 May 2001	10 November 2001	4	3	1	0	75.00
PFC CSKA Moscow	(Russia)	11 November 2001	13 November 2003	69	41	13	15	59.42
Russia	(Russia)	8 July 2002	25 August 2003	10	4	3	3	40.00
PFC CSKA Moscow	(Russia)	13 July 2004	5 December 2008	188	103	46	39	54.79
Dynamo Kyiv	(Ukraine)	1 June 2009	1 October 2010	59	38	11	10	64.41
Alania Vladikavkaz	(Russia)	16 November 2012	10 June 2013	15	2	3	10	13.33
Total				792	406	175	211	51.26

== Politics ==
In 2016, he was elected to the State Duma as a member of A Just Russia party. In the State Duma, he headed the Committee on Nationalities. From 4 February 2020, he served as Deputy Chairman of the Committee on Physical Culture, Sports, Tourism and Youth Affairs. Following the 2021 State Duma elections, he was not re-elected.

== Personal life ==
He is a cousin of Yuri Gazzaev and father of Vladimir Gazzayev, both of them football coaches as well.

== Honours ==
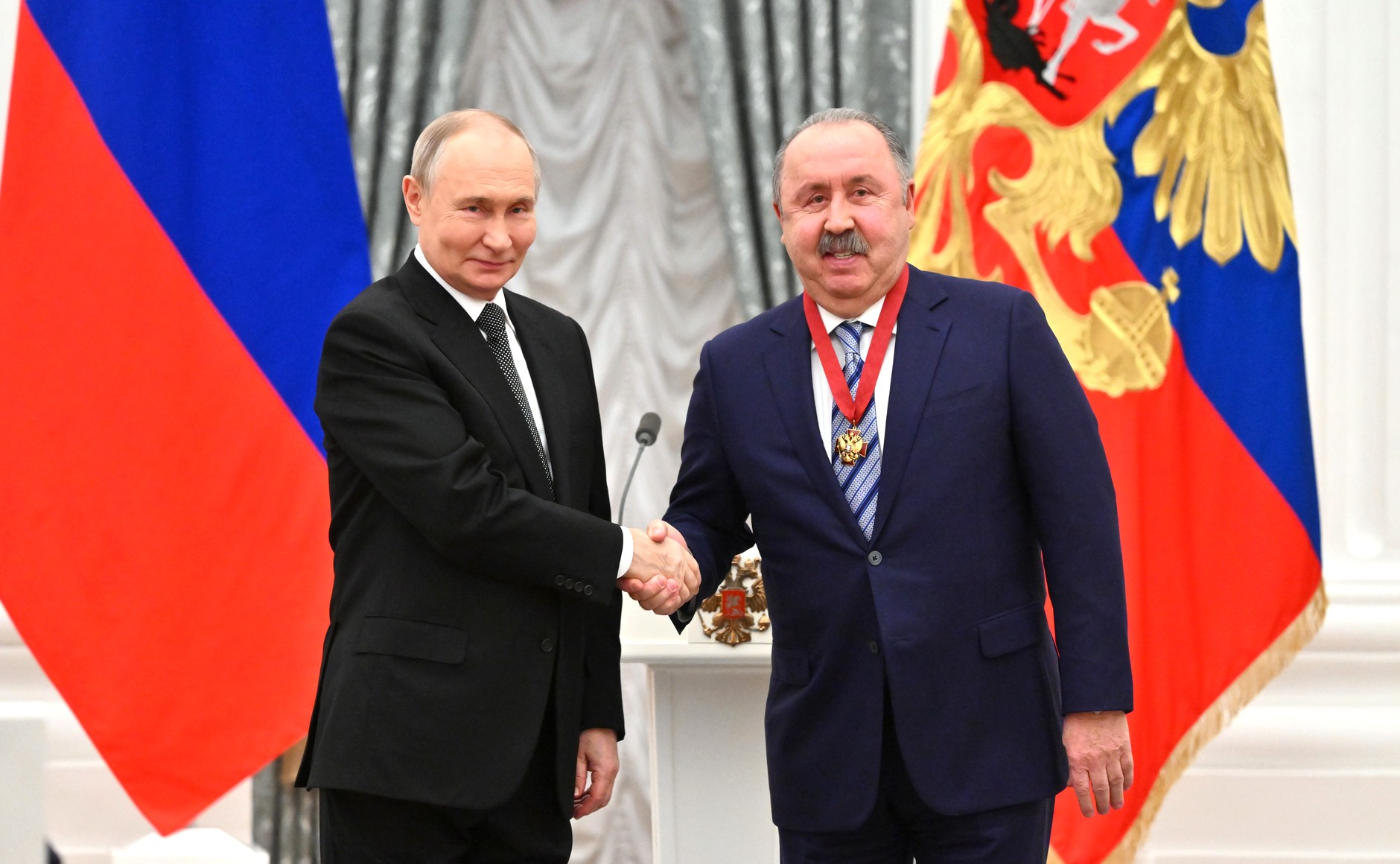
Russian President Vladimir Putin awarded of the Order "For Merit to the Fatherland", 3rd class, 12 December 2024

=== Player ===
Dynamo Moscow

- Soviet Top League: 1976
- Soviet Cup: 1977, 1984
- Soviet Super Cup: 1977
- Ciutat de Barcelona Trophy: 1976

=== Manager ===
Spartak-Alania Vladikavkaz

- Russian Top League: 1995

PFC CSKA Moscow

- Russian Premier League: 2003, 2005, 2006
- Russian Cup: 2001–02, 2004–05, 2005–06
- Russian Super Cup: 2004, 2006, 2007
- UEFA Cup: 2004–05

FC Dynamo Kyiv

- Ukrainian Super Cup: 2009

Individual

- Order of Friendship
- Order of Honour

== See also ==
- List of UEFA Cup and Europa League–winning managers
