= Aleksandr Yanovsky =

Russian coach and former football player (born 1952)

Personal information
- Full name: Aleksandr Arkadyevich Yanovsky
- Date of birth: November 1, 1952 (age 73)
- Height: 1.78 m (5 ft 10 in)
- Position: Goalkeeper

Team information
- Current team: FC Alania Vladikavkaz (assistant)

Senior career*
Years	Team	Apps	(Gls)
1971–1975	FC Spartak Ordzhonikidze	100	(0)
1976–1977	FC SKA Rostov-on-Don	60	(0)
1978	FC Lokomotiv Moscow	5	(0)
1979–1986	FC Pakhtakor Tashkent	201	(0)
1987–1988	FC Sokhibkor Khalkabad		
1988–1990	FC Pakhtakor Tashkent	96	(0)

Managerial career
- 1991–1997: FC Alania Vladikavkaz (assistant)
- 1993: FC Spartak Vladikavkaz (caretaker)
- 1998: FC Alania Vladikavkaz (director)
- 1999–2001: FC Alania Vladikavkaz (assistant)
- 2000: FC Alania Vladikavkaz (caretaker)
- 2001: FC Alania Vladikavkaz (caretaker)
- 2001: FC Alania Vladikavkaz
- 2002–2003: FC Spartak-Alania Vladikavkaz (assistant)
- 2003: FC Spartak-Alania Vladikavkaz (caretaker)
- 2005–: FC Alania Vladikavkaz (assistant)
- 2005: FC Alania Vladikavkaz (caretaker)
- 2005: FC Alania Vladikavkaz (caretaker)
- 2009: FC Alania Vladikavkaz (caretaker)
- * Club domestic league appearances and goals

Aleksandr Arkadyevich Yanovsky (Russian: Александр Аркадьевич Яновский, IPA: [ɐlʲɪkˈsandr ɐrˈkadʲjɪvʲɪtɕ jɪˈnovskʲɪj]; born November 1, 1952) is a Russian professional football coach and a former player.
