= Boris Stukalov =

Russian football manager (born 1953)

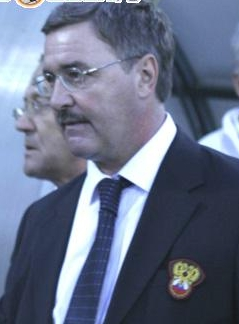
- Stukalov as coach of the Russia U21, 2007

Personal information
- Full name: Boris Alekseyevich Stukalov
- Date of birth: 24 January 1953 (age 73)
- Place of birth: Stavropol, Russian SFSR, Soviet Union
- Position: Midfielder

Senior career*
Years	Team	Apps	(Gls)
1973	Dynamo Stavropol	0	(0)
1975	Dynamo Stavropol	2	(0)

Managerial career
- 1982–1986: Dynamo Stavropol (assistant)
- 1986–1990: Dynamo Stavropol
- 1990: Dynamo Stavropol (director)
- 1991: Kairat
- 1992: Dynamo Stavropol
- 1992–1994: Viktor Zaporizhzhia
- 1994–1995: Dynamo Stavropol
- 1996–1997: Rotor Volgograd (assistant)
- 1997–1999: Dynamo Stavropol
- 1999: Rotor Volgograd (assistant)
- 2000–2002: Dynamo Stavropol
- 2002–2003: Dynamo Moscow (assistant)
- 2004: Arsenal Tula
- 2005: Tom Tomsk
- 2006: Alania Vladikavkaz
- 2007–2008: Russia U21
- 2009: Stavropol (general director)
- 2010: Ural Yekaterinburg
- 2012–2013: Biolog-Novokubansk
- 2013–2014: Angusht Nazran
- 2015–2016: Sibir Novosibirsk
- 2016–2018: Orenburg (sporting director)
- * Club domestic league appearances and goals

Boris Alekseyevich Stukalov (Russian: Борис Алексеевич Стукалов; born 24 January 1953) is a Russian professional football manager and a former player.

== Personal ==
His son Aleksei Stukalov is a professional football manager as well.
