= Paulo Emilio (footballer, born 1972) =

Brazilian footballer

Personal information
- Full name: Paulo Emilio Borges Rocha
- Date of birth: 14 May 1972 (age 54)
- Height: 1.68 m (5 ft 6 in)
- Position: Striker

Senior career*
Years	Team	Apps	(Gls)
- Mogi Mirim
- Bahia
1998–2002	FC Alania Vladikavkaz	120	(20)
2003	FC Volgar-Gazprom Astrakhan	16	(2)
- * Club domestic league appearances and goals

Paulo Emilio Borges Rocha or simply Paulo Emilio (born 14 May 1972) is a former Brazilian professional footballer.

== Club career ==
He made his debut in the Russian Premier League in 1998 for FC Alania Vladikavkaz. He played 2 games in the UEFA Cup 2000–01 for FC Alania Vladikavkaz.
