= Bakhva Tedeyev =

Russian footballer

Personal information
- Full name: Bakhva Otarovich Tedeyev
- Date of birth: 18 September 1969 (age 57)
- Place of birth: Tskhinvali, Georgian SSR
- Height: 1.79 m (5 ft 10 in)
- Positions: Midfielder; striker

Senior career*
Years	Team	Apps	(Gls)
1986–1989	FC Dinamo Tbilisi	18	(3)
1990–1992	Spartak Vladikavkaz	48	(14)
1993	FC Dynamo Moscow	30	(8)
1994–1997	FC Alania Vladikavkaz	100	(28)
1998	FC Lokomotiv Moscow	15	(1)
1999–2001	Alania Vladikavkaz	73	(14)

International career
1993–1994	Russia	6	(1)

Managerial career
- 2002: FC Alania Vladikavkaz
- 2003: FC Spartak-Alania Vladikavkaz
- 2004: FC Alania Vladikavkaz (assistant)
- 2005: FC Alania Vladikavkaz
- * Club domestic league appearances and goals

Bakhva Otarovich Tedeyev (Russian: Бахва Отарович Тедеев, Iron Ossetic: Тедеты Отары фырт Бахвæ; born 18 September 1969) is a retired football player. He was the head coach of FC Alania Vladikavkaz in 2002, 2003 and 2005. Born in Georgia, he played for the Russia national team.

== Honours ==
- Russian Premier League winner: 1995.
- Russian Premier League runner-up: 1992, 1996.
- Russian Premier League bronze: 1993, 1998.
- Top 33 players year-end list: 1992, 1993, 1995, 1996.

== International career ==
Tedeyev made his debut for Russia on 13 February 1993 in a friendly against United States. He scored his first goal for Russia four days later in another friendly, against El Salvador.
