= FC Spartak Vladikavkaz =

Spartak Vladikavkaz
- Full name: Football Club Spartak Vladikavkaz
- Nicknames: Iron Ossetic: Allon Franktæ, Russian: Alanskiye Barsy (Alanian Leopards) Red-Yellows
- Founded: 1921; 105 years ago
- Dissolved: 2020
- Ground: Republican Spartak Stadium, Vladikavkaz
- Capacity: 32,464
- League: N/A
- 2019–20: PFL; Zone South, 16th (dissolved)

FC Spartak Vladikavkaz (Russian: Футбольный клуб «Спартак Владикавказ») was a Russian football club based in Vladikavkaz (formerly Ordzhonikidze), North Ossetia–Alania. Founded in 1921, the club played in the Soviet Top League during the communist era, and won its first and only league title in the 1995 Russian Top League.

== History ==
At dissolution of the Soviet Union, Spartak Vladikavkaz were the only non-Muscovite Russian club competing in the old Soviet Top League. This had been their second and last season in the STL. Before that the only other season they competed in the top Soviet division was in 1970.

Their most successful season was 1995 when they managed to win the Russian Premier League champions title after several years of domination by Spartak Moscow. They were the first non-Muscovite Russian club to win the title since Zenit St Petersburg won the STL in 1984. The team had previously won a silver medal for second place in 1992 and 1996. However, in the qualification stages of the UEFA Champions League Alania lost 10–3 on aggregate to the Scottish club Rangers.

However, after departure of manager Valery Gazzaev and several players from the club, Alania were not able to repeat its success, finishing in the bottom half of the table.

Previously, the club was known as Spartak Ordzhonikidze (1937–1990), Spartak Vladikavkaz (1990–1994, 2006 and from 2016), Spartak-Alania Vladikavkaz (1995–1996 and 2003), Alania Vladikavkaz (1997–2002, 2004–2005 and from 2007 to 2016).

In season 2005 Alania was relegated from Russian Premier League after 15 seasons of top-flight football.

On 14 February 2006 Alania and another First Division club, Lokomotiv Chita, were denied professional licences by Professional Football League and excluded from professional football for juridical irregularities. On 22 February PFL decided to replace Alania and Lokomotiv with Lada Togliatti and Mashuk-KMV Pyatigorsk, the runners-up in the Second Division. The Russian Football Union did not endorse the exclusion and on 28 February decided to keep Alania and Lokomotiv in the First Division, giving them another chance to fulfill the league requirements. Consequently, on 6 March PFL decided to extend the First Division from 22 to 24 clubs, including Alania, Lokomotiv, Lada, and Mashuk-KMV.

However, on 20 March the Russian Football Union finally decided to exclude Alania and Lokomotiv from the league. This decision was announced by the Professional Football League on 21 March, five days before the start of the First Division.

Alania underwent reorganization, were renamed Spartak Vladikavkaz and on 4 April were admitted into the Russian Second Division, South zone.

After finishing first in the South Zone of 2nd division in the 2006 the team was promoted to Russian First Division and again renamed to Alania.

In 2009, Alania achieved 3rd place in the Russian First Division, just below the nominal promotion places. However, due to FC Moscow being expelled from the Russian Premier League, Alania were chosen to take their place. Their season back in the top flight was not successful and only Sibir Novosibirsk finished below them, thus going back to the First Division; despite the subsequent withdrawal of Amkar Perm and Saturn Moscow Oblast, Alania was refused a reprieve by the RPL.

In the spring of 2011, Alania qualified for the final of the 2010–11 Russian Cup, where it met PFC CSKA Moscow. CSKA already qualified for the UEFA Champions League spot, and therefore Alania secured a spot in the 2011–12 UEFA Europa League regardless of the final result. That is the second occasion in Russian football history when a second-level division team qualified for European competition (the first one was FC Terek Grozny). Alania achieved a rare feat of reaching the cup final without scoring a single regular-time goal. On three occasions they won a penalty shootout after playing the game with a score of 0–0 and once they received a bye after their opponent team went bankrupt.

In February 2014, Alania pulled out of the 2013–14 Russia First Division, due to financial liquidation and sponsorship problems, and the club was dissolved. Before the 2014–15 season, former Alania's farm club, FC Alania-d Vladikavkaz, was renamed to Alania, and this club participated in the Russian Professional Football League from the 2014–15 season.

Before the 2016–17 season, FC Alania Vladikavkaz that participated in the third-tier Russian Professional Football League was dissolved and a formally new club called FC Spartak was organized again and registered for PFL. PFL did not allow the club to register with 'Alania' in their name due to accumulated debts for the club of that name.

Before the 2019–20 season, a new club was created with the historical name Alania that was privately owned. The team was tasked with returning to the elite of Russian football. However, Spartak Vladikavkaz also remained in the Russian Professional Football League for the 2019–20, where it finished in last place, before being dissolved in the summer of 2020.

=== European ===
As of match played 25 August 2011

Competition	Pld	W	D	L	GF	GA	GD
UEFA Champions League	2	0	0	2	3	10	–7
UEFA Cup/Europa League	16	4	5	7	14	24	-10
Total	18	4	5	9	17	34	-17

Season	Competition	Round	Country	Club	Home	Away
1993–94	UEFA Cup	R1	(Germany)	Borussia Dortmund	0–1	0–0
1995–96	UEFA Cup	R1	(England)	Liverpool F.C.	1–2	0–0
1996–97	Champions League	QR1	(Scotland)	Rangers F.C.	2–7	1–3
1996–97	UEFA Cup	R1	(Belgium)	RSC Anderlecht	2–1	0–4
1997–98	UEFA Cup	QR2	(Ukraine)	Dnipro Dnipropetrovsk	2–1	4–1
1997–98	UEFA Cup	R1	(Hungary)	MTK Budapest	1–1	0–3
2000–01	UEFA Cup	R1	(Poland)	Amica Wronki	0–3	0–2
2011–12	UEFA Europa League	QR3	(Kazakhstan)	FC Aktobe	1–1	1–1 (4–2 p.)
2011–12	UEFA Europa League	Play-off	(Turkey)	Besiktas JK	2–0	0–3

== Honours ==
- Russian Premier League
  - Winners (1): 1995
  - Runners-up (2): 1992, 1996
- Russian Cup
  - Runners-up (1): 2010–11
- Soviet First League
  - Winners (2): 1969, 1990
- Russian Football National League
  - Runners-up (1): 2011–12
- Soviet Second League/Russian Professional Football League
  - Winners (2): 1983, 2006
  - Runners-up (2): 1966, 1982

== League history ==
=== Soviet Union ===
Season	Div.	Pos.	Pl.	W	D	L	GS	GA	P	Cup	Europe	Top scorer (League)
1960	2nd, RSFSR-3	14	26	3	4	19	26	68	10	-	-	
1961	2nd, RSFSR-4	10	24	6	6	12	32	57	18	1/64	-	
1962	2nd, RSFSR-3	8	28	10	6	12	38	36	26	1/128	-	
1963	3rd, RSFSR-3	7	30	12	8	10	47	39	32	1/512	-	
1964	3rd, RSFSR-4	4	34	16	7	11	53	35	39	1/512	-	
1964	3rd, RSFSR-final	4	8	3	2	3	9	10	8	1/512	-	
1965	3rd, RSFSR-4	9	38	16	7	15	54	43	39	-	-	
1966	3rd, RSFSR-4	1	38	22	9	7	80	40	53	1/32	-	
1966	3rd, RSFSR-final	2	7	4	1	2	9	4	9	1/32	-	
1967	2nd, group 1	16	38	10	11	17	34	45	31	1/32	-	
1968	2nd, group 3	2	40	19	12	9	53	29	50	1/64	-	(Soviet Union) Kaishauri: 18
1969	2nd, group 1	1	38	22	12	4	60	25	60	1/64	-	(Soviet Union) Papelishvili: 16
1969	2nd, final	1	3	2	0	1	4	2	4	1/64	-	(Soviet Union) Papelishvili: 16
1970	Top League	17	32	7	8	17	31	48	22	1/16	-	(Soviet Union) Kaishauri: 8
1971	2nd	5	42	19	7	16	52	57	45	1/16	-	(Soviet Union) Zazroev: 11
1972	2nd	9	38	14	10	14	49	50	38	1/16	-	(Soviet Union) Kaishauri: 18
1973	2nd	17	38	13	7	18	29	44	30	1/16	-	(Soviet Union) Kaishauri: 7
1974	2nd	17	38	15	4	19	45	67	34	1/32	-	(Soviet Union) Kitaev: 17
1975	2nd	9	38	15	7	16	41	43	37	1/32	-	(Soviet Union) V. Gazzaev: 14
1976	2nd	15	38	11	14	13	40	50	36	1/32	-	(Soviet Union) Kaishauri: 11
1977	2nd	15	38	11	11	16	38	45	33	1/32	-	(Soviet Union) Khuadonov: 6
1978	2nd	18	38	10	8	20	30	50	28	1/16	-	(Soviet Union) Khuadonov: 9
1979	2nd	13	46	19	7	20	49	44	45	group stage	-	(Soviet Union) Suanov, (Soviet Union) Zazroev: 9
1980	2nd	15	46	17	9	20	43	50	43	group stage	-	(Soviet Union) Khuadonov: 9
1981	2nd	21	46	14	12	20	36	49	40	group stage	-	(Soviet Union) Y. Gazzaev: 10
1982	3rd, zone 3	1	32	22	6	4	64	18	50	-	-	(Soviet Union) Y. Gazzaev: 23
1982	3rd, final-1	2	4	1	2	1	5	4	4	-	-	
1983	3rd, zone 3	1	30	23	2	5	69	23	48	-	-	
1983	3rd, final-2	1	4	1	3	0	2	0	5	-	-	
1984	2nd	16	42	15	8	19	42	51	38	1/32	-	(Soviet Union) Argudyaev: 13
1985	2nd	16	38	17	4	17	49	52	38	1/16	-	(Soviet Union) Ambalov: 12
1986	2nd	16	46	15	12	19	58	66	42	1/64	-	(Soviet Union) Ploshnik: 16
1987	2nd	18	42	12	12	18	37	46	36	1/64	-	(Soviet Union) Gagloev: 8
1988	2nd	13	42	15	9	8	57	60	39	1/32	-	(Soviet Union) Y. Gazzaev: 10
1989	2nd	17	42	12	11	19	44	61	35	1/64	-	(Soviet Union) Y. Gazzaev: 10, (Soviet Union) Tskhovrebov: 7
1990	2nd	1	38	24	9	5	73	30	57	1/64	-	(Soviet Union) (Russia) Tedeev: 23
1991	Top League	11	30	9	8	13	33	41	26	1/64	-	(Soviet Union) (Azerbaijan) Suleymanov: 13
1992	-	-	-	-	-	-	-	-	-	1/16	-	

=== Russia ===
Season	Div.	Pos.	Pl.	W	D	L	GS	GA	P	Cup	Europe		Top scorer (League)
1992	RFPL	2	26	13	6	7	47	33	32	-	-		(Azerbaijan) Suleymanov: 12
1993	RFPL	6	34	16	6	12	49	45	38	1/16	-		(Azerbaijan) Suleymanov, (Belarus) Markhel: 14
1994	RFPL	5	30	11	11	8	32	34	33	1/2	UC	R1	(Azerbaijan) Suleymanov: 6
1995	RFPL	1	30	22	5	3	63	21	71	1/2	-		(Georgia (country)) Kavelashvili: 12
1996	RFPL	2	35	22	6	7	65	37	72	1/16	UC	R1	(Azerbaijan) Suleymanov, (Russia) Tedeev, (Uzbekistan) Kasymov: 11
1997	RFPL	10	34	14	4	16	52	42	46	1/8	UC	R1	(Russia) Yanovsky: 13
1998	RFPL	8	30	11	7	12	46	39	40	1/2	UC	R1	(Georgia (country)) Demetradze: 14
1999	RFPL	6	30	12	7	11	54	45	43	1/8	-		(Georgia (country)) Demetradze: 21
2000	RFPL	10	30	10	8	12	34	36	38	1/16	-		(Russia) Tedeev: 10
2001	RFPL	11	30	8	8	14	31	47	32	1/16	UC	R1	(Brazil) Paolo Emilio: 6
2002	RFPL	12	30	8	6	16	31	42	30	1/16	-		(Georgia (country)) Demetradze, (Russia) D. Bazaev: 6
2003	RFPL	13	30	9	4	17	23	43	31	1/16	-		(Latvia) Mikholap: 4
2004	RFPL	14	30	7	7	16	28	52	28	1/8	-		(Russia) G. Bazaev, (Romania) Tudor: 5
2005	RFPL	15	30	5	8	17	27	53	23	1/8	-		(Russia) D. Bazaev: 9
2006	3rd, "South"	1	32	27	3	2	81	20	84	1/16	-		(Russia) Dubrovin: 28
2007	2nd	12	42	15	11	16	56	56	56	1/64	-		(Russia) Dubrovin: 19
2008	2nd	10	42	17	8	17	50	41	59	1/32	-		(Moldova) Dadu: 18
2009	2nd	3	38	21	7	10	57	30	70	1/16	-		(Moldova) Dadu: 12
2010	RFPL	15	30	4	8	18	34	58	20	F	-		(Russia) Gabulov, (Russia) Marenich: 4
2011–12	2nd	2	52	28	13	11	66	39	97	1/32	-		(Uzbekistan) Bikmaev: 11
2012–13	RFPL	16	30	4	7	19	26	53	19	1/16	-		(Brazil) Neco: 9
2013–14	2nd	12	36	14	4	18	29	52	46	1/16	-		(Russia) Khastsayev: 13
2014–15	3rd, "South"	17	20	5	6	9	21	33	21	1/256	-		(Russia) Burayev: 12
2015–16	3rd, "South"	11	24	4	7	13	15	37	19	1/256	-		(Russia) Sikoyev: 7
2016–17	3rd, "South"	10	30	10	7	13	26	36	37	1/128	-		(Russia) Gatikoev: 8
2017–18	3rd, "South"	13	32	8	8	16	26	41	32	1/256	-		(Russia) Gurtsiev: 5
2018–19	3rd, "South"	10	28	8	6	14	36	48	30	1/64	-		(Russia) Zhabkin: 8
2019–20		16	19	1	5	13	14	40	8	1/256	-		

1. Alania withdrew from the league in February 2014 due to financial problems.

== Former coaches ==
- (Soviet Union) Grigoriy Gornostaev (1966–1967)
- (Soviet Union) Mussa Tsalikov (1967)
- (Soviet Union) Andrei Zazroyev (1968–1970)
- (Soviet Union) Kazbek Tuaev (1970)
- (Soviet Union) Sergei Korshunov (1971)
- (Soviet Union) Dmitri Chikhradze (1971)
- (Soviet Union) Andrei Zazroyev (1972)
- (Soviet Union) Ivan Larin (1973)
- (Soviet Union) Kazbek Tuaev (1974–1977)
- (Soviet Union) Viktor Belov (1977–1978)
- (Soviet Union) Mussa Tsalikov (1978–1980)
- (Soviet Union) Andrei Zazroyev (1980–1981)
- (Soviet Union) Aleksandr Kochetkov (1982)
- (Soviet Union) Valeri Maslov (1983)
- (Soviet Union) Ivan Varlamov (1984)
- (Soviet Union) Valeri Ovchinnikov (1985–1986)
- (Soviet Union) Igor Zazroyev (1986–1987)
- (Soviet Union) Oleg Romantsev (1988)
- (Soviet Union) Valeriy Gazzaev (1989–1991)
- (Russia) Nikolay Khudiyev (1991)
- (Russia) Aleksandr Novikov (1992–1993)
- (Russia) Valeriy Gazzaev (1994–1999)
- (Russia) Vladimir Gutsaev (2000)
- (Russia) Aleksandr Averyanov (2000–2001)
- (Russia) Aleksandr Yanovskiy (2001–2002)
- (Ukraine) Volodymyr Muntyan (2002)
- (Russia) Bakhva Tedeyev (2002)
- (Georgia (country)) Revaz Dzodzuashvili (2003)
- (Russia) Nikolay Khudiyev (2003)
- (Russia) Bakhva Tedeyev (2003–2004)
- (France) Rolland Courbis (2004–2005)
- (Russia) Yuri Sekinaev (2004)
- (Russia) Bakhva Tedeyev (2005)
- (Russia) Edgar Gess (2005)
- (Israel) Itzhak Shum (2005)
- (Russia) Aleksandr Yanovskiy (2005–2006)
- (Russia) Boris Stukalov (2006–2007)
- (Russia) Stanislav Tskhovrebov (2007–2008)
- (Russia) Valery Petrakov (2009)
- (Romania) Mircea Rednic (2009)
- (Russia) Vladimir Shevchuk (2010–2011)
- (Russia) Vladimir Gazzayev (2011–2012)
- (Russia) Valeriy Gazzaev (2012–2014)
- (Russia) Artur Pagayev (2014–2015)
- (Russia) Zaur Tedeyev (2015–2016)
- (Russia) Fyodor Gagloyev (2016)
- (Russia) Marat Dzoblayev (2016–2017)
- (Russia) Yuri Gazzaev (2018)
- (Russia) Spartak Gogniyev (2019–Current)

== Notable players ==
Soviet Union/Russia

- (Soviet Union) Valeriy Gazzaev
- (Soviet Union) (Russia) Stanislav Cherchesov
- (Soviet Union) (Russia) Zaur Khapov
- (Soviet Union) (Russia) Viktor Bulatov
- (Soviet Union) (Russia) Vasili Baranov
- (Soviet Union) (Russia) Victor Onopko
- (Soviet Union) (Russia) Yuri Kovtun
- (Soviet Union) (Russia) Artur Pagayev
- (Soviet Union) (Russia) Bakhva Tedeev
- (Soviet Union) (Russia) Omari Tetradze
- (Russia) Soslan Dzhanayev
- (Russia) Igor Yanovsky
- (Russia) Spartak Gogniyev
- (Russia) Alan Kasaev

Georgia

- (Georgia (country)) Mikhail Kavelashvili
- (Georgia (country)) Giorgi Demetradze
- (Georgia (country)) Murtaz Shelia
- (Georgia (country)) Mikheil Ashvetia
- (Georgia (country)) Levan Kobiashvili
- (Georgia (country)) Mamuka Kobakhidze
- (Georgia (country)) Giorgi Chanturia

Uzbekistan

- (Uzbekistan) Mirjalol Qosimov

Hungary

- (Hungary) Tamás Priskin

Belarus

- (Belarus) (Brazil) Renan Bressan

Tajikistan

- (Tajikistan) Rahmatullo Fuzailov

Togo

- (Togo) Abdoul-Gafar Mamah

Ivory Coast

- (Ivory Coast) Dacosta Goore

Nigeria

- (Nigeria) Isaac Okoronkwo
- (Nigeria) Sani Kaita
- (Nigeria) Justice Christopher

Bosnia and Herzegovina

- (Bosnia and Herzegovina) Ognjen Vranješ
- (Bosnia and Herzegovina) Zajko Zeba
- (Bosnia and Herzegovina) Vladan Grujić

Lithuania

- (Lithuania) Deividas Semberas

Burkina Faso

- (Burkina Faso) Ibrahim Gnanou

Romania

- (Romania) George Florescu
- (Romania) Cristian Tudor

El Salvador

- (El Salvador) Rodolfo Zelaya

Netherlands

- (Netherlands) Royston Drenthe

Azerbaijan

- (Azerbaijan) Nazim Suleymanov

Moldova

- (Moldova) Sergiu Dadu

New Zealand

- (New Zealand) Kosta Barbarouses
