= 2002 FC Spartak Moscow season =

Spartak Moscow
2002 season
- Manager: Oleg Romantsev
- Stadium: Luzhniki Stadium
- Premier League: 3rd
- Russian Cup: Progressed to 2003 season
- UEFA Champions League: Group stage
- Top goalscorer: League: Vladimir Beschastnykh (12); All: Vladimir Beschastnykh (14)

The 2002 FC Spartak Moscow season was the club's 11th season in the Russian Premier League season. Spartak were defending Premier League Champions, having won the previous six titles, but finished the season in third place. In the Russian Cup, Spartak progressed the quarterfinals of the 2002–03 cup, which will take place in the 2003 season. In Europe, Spartak finished bottom of their UEFA Champions League group where they played Valencia, Basel and Liverpool.

== Squad ==
As of match played 17 November 2002

| No. | Name | Nationality | Position | Date of birth (age) | Signed from | Signed in | Contract ends | Apps. | Goals |
Goalkeepers
| 1 | Maksym Levytskyi | (Ukraine) | GK | 26 November 1972 (aged 29) | Saint-Étienne | 2001 | | | |
| 45 | Stanislav Cherchesov | (Russia) | GK | 2 September 1963 (aged 39) | Tirol Innsbruck | 2002 | | | |
| | Predrag Ristović | (Federal Republic of Yugoslavia) | GK | 21 September 1975 (aged 27) | Zemun | 2001 | | | |
Defenders
| 2 | Yuri Kovtun | (Russia) | DF | 5 January 1970 (aged 32) | Dynamo Moscow | 1999 | 2005 | | |
| 3 | Ibra Kébé | (Senegal) | DF | 24 December 1978 (aged 23) | ASC Jeanne d'Arc | 2001 | | | |
| 4 | Jerry-Christian Tchuissé | (Cameroon) | DF | 13 January 1975 (aged 27) | Chernomorets Novorossiysk | 2000 | | | |
| 18 | Dmytro Parfenov | (Ukraine) | DF | 11 September 1974 (aged 28) | Dnipro Dnipropetrovsk | 1998 | 2005 | | |
| 29 | Igor Mitreski | (North Macedonia) | DF | 19 February 1979 (aged 23) | Sileks | 2001 | | | |
| 34 | Moisés Moura | (Brazil) | DF | 25 July 1979 (aged 23) | Paraná | 2002 | | 30 | 1 |
| 44 | Valeri Abramidze | (Georgia (country)) | DF | 17 January 1980 (aged 22) | Torpedo Kutaisi | 2002 | 2006 | 11 | 0 |
| 48 | Samuel Ogunsania | (Nigeria) | DF | 1 March 1980 (aged 22) | Enyimba | 2002 | 2004 | 2 | 0 |
| 51 | Robert Scarlett | (Jamaica) | DF | 14 January 1979 (aged 23) | Harbour View | 2002 | 2002 | 1 | 0 |
| 55 | Dmitri Khlestov | (Russia) | DF | 21 January 1971 (aged 31) | Beşiktaş | 2002 | 2002 | | |
| | Sergei Kabanov | (Russia) | DF | 15 March 1986 (aged 16) | Youth Team | 2002 | | 0 | 0 |
Midfielders
| 7 | Vasili Baranov | (Belarus) | MF | 5 October 1972 (aged 30) | Baltika Kaliningrad | 1998 | | | |
| 8 | Marcelo Silva | (Brazil) | MF | 25 May 1976 (aged 26) | Santos | 2002 | 2004 | 5 | 0 |
| 9 | Yegor Titov | (Russia) | MF | 29 May 1976 (aged 26) | Youth Team | 1995 | | 282 | 74 |
| 10 | Eduard Tsykhmeystruk | (Ukraine) | MF | 24 June 1973 (aged 29) | Levski Sofia | 2001 | | | |
| 13 | Dmitri Kudryashov | (Russia) | MF | 13 May 1983 (aged 19) | Saint-Étienne | 2002 | | 29 | 5 |
| 14 | Maksym Kalynychenko | (Ukraine) | MF | 26 January 1979 (aged 23) | Dnipro Dnipropetrovsk | 2000 | | 56 | 9 |
| 21 | Artyom Bezrodny | (Russia) | MF | 10 February 1979 (aged 23) | Bayer Leverkusen | 1998 | | | |
| 23 | Pyotr Nemov | (Russia) | MF | 18 October 1983 (aged 19) | Dynamo Moscow | 2002 | | 2 | 0 |
| 24 | Andrei Streltsov | (Russia) | MF | 18 March 1984 (aged 18) | Youth Team | 2001 | | | |
| 25 | Aleksandr Pavlenko | (Ukraine) | MF | 20 January 1985 (aged 17) | Lausanne-Sport | 2001 | | 17 | 0 |
| 26 | Aleksandr Sheshukov | (Russia) | MF | 15 April 1983 (aged 19) | Spartak Tambov | 2002 | | 2 | 0 |
| 39 | Aleksei Rebko | (Russia) | MF | 23 April 1986 (aged 16) | Youth Team | 2001 | | 2 | 0 |
| 40 | Aleksandr Samedov | (Russia) | MF | 19 July 1984 (aged 18) | Youth Team | 2001 | | 1 | 0 |
| 41 | Dmitri Torbinski | (Russia) | MF | 28 April 1984 (aged 18) | Youth Team | 2001 | | 6 | 0 |
Forwards
| 11 | Vladimir Beschastnykh | (Russia) | FW | 1 April 1974 (aged 28) | Racing Santander | 2001 | | | |
| 16 | Pavel Pogrebnyak | (Russia) | FW | 8 November 1983 (aged 19) | Youth Team | 2002 | | 2 | 0 |
| 19 | Dmitri Sychev | (Russia) | FW | 26 October 1983 (aged 19) | Spartak Tambov | 2002 | | 19 | 10 |
| 20 | Aleksandr Danishevsky | (Russia) | FW | 23 February 1984 (aged 18) | Youth Team | 2001 | | | |
| 30 | Aleksandr Sonin | (Russia) | FW | 6 August 1983 (aged 19) | Saint-Étienne | 2001 | | | |
| 42 | Okon Flo Essien | (Nigeria) | FW | 31 December 1981 (aged 20) | Dolphin | 2001 | | | |
Away on loan
| 15 | Raman Vasilyuk | (Belarus) | FW | 23 November 1978 (aged 23) | Slavia Mozyr | 2001 | | | |
| | Maksim Kabanov | (Russia) | GK | 30 December 1982 (aged 19) | Youth Team | 2001 | | | |
| | Aleksei Zuev | (Russia) | GK | 3 February 1981 (aged 21) | Spartak-Zvezda Shchyolkovo | 2001 | | | |
| | Goran Maznov | (North Macedonia) | FW | 22 April 1981 (aged 21) | Sloga Jugomagnat | 2001 | | | |
Players that left Spartak Moscow during the season
| 6 | Dmitri Ananko | (Russia) | DF | 29 September 1973 (aged 29) | Youth Team | 1991 | | | |
| 22 | Dmitri Goncharov | (Russia) | GK | 15 April 1975 (aged 27) | Fakel Voronezh | 2002 | | 6 | 0 |
| | Adnan Gušo | (Bosnia and Herzegovina) | GK | 30 November 1975 (aged 26) | Erzurumspor | 2001 | | | |
| | Slavko Matić | (Federal Republic of Yugoslavia) | DF | 15 April 1975 (aged 27) | OFK Beograd | 2001 | | | |
| | Marco Villaseca | (Chile) | MF | 15 March 1975 (aged 27) | Colo-Colo | 2002 | 2004 | 0 | 0 |
| | Lawrence Adjei | (Ghana) | MF | 23 March 1979 (aged 23) | Asante Kotoko | 2001 | | | |
| | Valerijus Mižigurskis | (Lithuania) | FW | 22 April 1983 (aged 19) | Žalgiris Vilnius | 2002 | | 0 | 0 |

=== On loan ===
Note: Flags indicate national team as defined under FIFA eligibility rules; some limited exceptions apply. Players may hold more than one non-FIFA nationality.

| No. | Pos. | Nation | Player |
|---|---|---|---|
| 15 | FW | BLR | Raman Vasilyuk (at Dinamo Minsk) |
| — | GK | RUS | Maksim Kabanov (at Fakel-Voronezh) |

| No. | Pos. | Nation | Player |
|---|---|---|---|
| — | GK | RUS | Aleksei Zuev (at Khimki) |
| — | FW | MKD | Goran Maznov (at Sloga Jugomagnat) |

=== Left club during season ===
Note: Flags indicate national team as defined under FIFA eligibility rules; some limited exceptions apply. Players may hold more than one non-FIFA nationality.

| No. | Pos. | Nation | Player |
|---|---|---|---|
| 6 | DF | RUS | Dmitri Ananko (to AC Ajaccio) |
| 22 | GK | RUS | Dmitri Goncharov (to Alania Vladikavkaz) |
| — | GK | BIH | Adnan Gušo (at Sarajevo) |
| — | DF | YUG | Slavko Matić (to Čukarički Stankom) |

| No. | Pos. | Nation | Player |
|---|---|---|---|
| — | MF | CHI | Marco Villaseca (to Colo-Colo) |
| — | MF | GHA | Lawrence Adjei (to SV Eintracht Trier 05) |
| — | FW | LTU | Valerijus Mižigurskis (to Žalgiris Vilnius) |

== Transfers ==
=== In ===
| Date | Position | Nationality | Name | From | Fee | Ref. |
|---|---|---|---|---|---|---|
| Winter 2002 | GK | (Russia) | Dmitri Goncharov | Fakel Voronezh | Undisclosed | |
| Winter 2002 | DF | (Brazil) | Moisés Moura | Paraná | Undisclosed | |
| Winter 2002 | MF | (Russia) | Dmitri Kudryashov | Saint-Étienne | Undisclosed | |
| Winter 2002 | MF | (Russia) | Pyotr Nemov | Dynamo Moscow | Undisclosed | |
| Winter 2002 | MF | (Russia) | Aleksandr Sheshukov | Spartak Tambov | Undisclosed | |
| Winter 2002 | FW | (Russia) | Dmitri Sychev | Spartak Tambov | Undisclosed | |
| 6 March 2002 | MF | (Chile) | Marco Villaseca | Colo-Colo | Undisclosed | |
| Summer 2002 | GK | (Russia) | Stanislav Cherchesov | Tirol Innsbruck | Undisclosed | |
| 23 July 2002 | MF | (Brazil) | Marcelo Silva | Santos | Undisclosed | |
| 1 August 2002 | DF | (Georgia (country)) | Valeri Abramidze | Torpedo Kutaisi | Undisclosed | |
| 27 August 2002 | DF | (Jamaica) | Robert Scarlett | Harbour View | Undisclosed | |
| 27 August 2002 | DF | (Nigeria) | Samuel Ogunsania | Enyimba | Undisclosed | |
| 29 August 2002 | DF | (Russia) | Dmitri Khlestov | Beşiktaş | Free | |
| 29 August 2002 | MF | (Brazil) | Androsinho | | | |

=== Out ===
| Date | Position | Nationality | Name | To | Fee | Ref. |
|---|---|---|---|---|---|---|
| 31 July 2002 | GK | (Russia) | Dmitri Goncharov | Alania Vladikavkaz | Undisclosed | |
| Summer 2002 | GK | (Bosnia and Herzegovina) | Adnan Gušo | Sarajevo | Undisclosed | |
| Summer 2002 | DF | (Russia) | Dmitri Ananko | AC Ajaccio | Undisclosed | |
| Summer 2002 | DF | (Federal Republic of Yugoslavia) | Slavko Matić | Čukarički Stankom | Undisclosed | |
| Summer 2002 | MF | (Chile) | Marco Villaseca | Colo-Colo | Undisclosed | |
| Summer 2002 | MF | (Ghana) | Lawrence Adjei | SV Eintracht Trier 05 | Undisclosed | |
| Summer 2002 | FW | (Lithuania) | Valerijus Mižigurskis | Žalgiris Vilnius | Undisclosed | |

=== Loans out ===
| Date from | Position | Nationality | Name | To | Date to | Ref. |
|---|---|---|---|---|---|---|
| Winter 2002 | GK | (Bosnia and Herzegovina) | Adnan Gušo | Željezničar Sarajevo | Summer 2002 | |
| Winter 2002 | GK | (Russia) | Maksim Kabanov | Fakel Voronezh | End of Season | |
| Winter 2002 | GK | (Russia) | Aleksei Zuev | Khimki | End of Season | |
| Winter 2002 | MF | (Ghana) | Lawrence Adjei | Arminia Bielefeld | Summer 2002 | |
| Winter 2002 | FW | (North Macedonia) | Goran Maznov | Sloga Jugomagnat | End of Season | |
| Summer 2002 | FW | (Belarus) | Raman Vasilyuk | Dinamo Minsk | End of Season | |

=== Released ===
| Date | Position | Nationality | Name | Joined | Date |
|---|---|---|---|---|---|
| 31 December 2002 | GK | (Russia) | Stanislav Cherchesov | Retired | |
| 31 December 2002 | GK | (Federal Republic of Yugoslavia) | Predrag Ristović | Rad | |
| 31 December 2002 | GK | (Ukraine) | Maksym Levytskyi | Chernomorets Novorossiysk | |
| 31 December 2002 | DF | (Cameroon) | Jerry-Christian Tchuissé | Chernomorets Novorossiysk | |
| 31 December 2002 | DF | (Jamaica) | Robert Scarlett | Harbour View | |
| 31 December 2002 | DF | (Nigeria) | Samuel Ogunsania | Enyimba | |
| 31 December 2002 | DF | (Russia) | Dmitri Khlestov | Torpedo-ZIL Moscow | |
| 31 December 2002 | MF | (Russia) | Dmitri Kudryashov | Krylia Sovetov | |
| 31 December 2002 | MF | (Russia) | Pyotr Nemov | Krylia Sovetov | |
| 31 December 2002 | MF | (Ukraine) | Eduard Tsykhmeystruk | Metalurh Donetsk | |

== Competitions ==
=== Premier League ===
==== Results by round ====
| Round | 1 | 2 | 3 | 4 | 5 | 6 | 7 | 8 | 9 | 10 | 11 | 12 | 13 | 14 | 15 | 16 | 17 | 18 | 19 | 20 | 21 | 22 | 23 | 24 | 25 | 26 | 27 | 28 | 29 | 30 |
|---|---|---|---|---|---|---|---|---|---|---|---|---|---|---|---|---|---|---|---|---|---|---|---|---|---|---|---|---|---|---|
| Ground | H | H | A | H | A | H | A | H | A | H | A | H | A | H | A | H | A | H | A | H | A | H | A | A | A | H | A | H | A | H |
| Result | D | W | W | L | D | W | W | L | L | L | W | W | W | W | W | W | W | W | D | W | D | L | D | D | D | W | W | W | L | L |

Updated to match(es) played on 17 November 2002. Source: See Results
A = Away; H = Home; W = Win; D = Draw; L = Loss

==== Results ====
| 8 March 2002 1 | Spartak Moscow | 0 – 0 | Rostselmash | Moscow |
| 17:00 MSK (UTC+3) | Parfenov (penalty missed) 52' | Report | | Stadium: Luzhniki Stadium; Attendance: 10,000; Referee: Sergey Fursa |

| 12 March 2002 2 | Spartak Moscow | 3 – 0 | Shinnik Yaroslavl | Moscow |
| 19:00 MSK (UTC+3) | Sychev 11', 78'; Kudryashov (yellow card) 33'; Parfenov 45'; Kébé (yellow card) 66' | Report | Fuzailov (yellow card) 79' | Stadium: Luzhniki Stadium; Attendance: 7,000; Referee: Alexander Evstigneev |

| 16 March 2002 3 | Krylia Sovetov | 0 – 2 | Spartak Moscow | Samara |
| 17:00 MSK (UTC+3) | Karyaka (yellow card) 20'; Bobyor (yellow card) 90+' | Report | Titov (yellow card) 38' (goal) 67'; Kovtun (yellow card) 43' (yellow-red card) 45'; Sychev 58' | Stadium: Metallurg Stadium; Attendance: 30,000; Referee: Nikolai Ivanov |

| 22 March 2002 4 | Spartak Moscow | 1 – 2 | Lokomotiv Moscow | Moscow |
| 18:00 MSK (UTC+3) | Baranov 25'; Parfenov (yellow card) 71' | Report | Maminov (yellow card) 30' (yellow-red card) 90'; Sırxayev (yellow card) 53'; Pimenov 58', 60'; Izmailov (yellow card) 67'; Loskov (yellow card) 85'; Obradović (yellow card) 88' | Stadium: Luzhniki Stadium; Attendance: 27,000; Referee: Yuri Baskakov |

| 31 March 2002 5 | Anzhi Makhachkala | 3 – 3 | Spartak Moscow | Makhachkala |
| 17:00 MSK (DST) (UTC+4) | Budunov 5'; Prudius 50'; Mzhavanadze (yellow card) 60'; Glogovac (yellow card) 66'; Savelyev 84' | Report | Titov 30'; Beschastnykh 41' (yellow card) 57'; Ananko (yellow card) 63'; Sychev 84' | Stadium: Dynamo Stadium; Attendance: 16,500; Referee: Yuri Chebotaryov |

| 6 April 2002 6 | Spartak Moscow | 2 – 0 | Rotor Volgograd | Moscow |
| 16:00 MSK (DST) (UTC+4) | Sychev 19', 48'; Ananko (yellow card) 23'; Titov (yellow card) 24'; Parfenov (yellow card) 65' | Report | Olenikov (yellow card) 43' | Stadium: Luzhniki Stadium; Attendance: 7,000; Referee: Vladimir Vlasov |

| 12 April 2002 7 | Torpedo Moscow | 1 – 2 | Spartak Moscow | Moscow |
| 18:00 MSK (DST) (UTC+4) | Semshov 47'; Sarkisyan (yellow card) 76'; Sajaia (yellow card) 81' | Report | Parfenov (yellow card) 1'; Titov 18'; Kébé (yellow card) 19'; Tsykhmeystruk (yellow card) 29' (goal) 60' | Stadium: Luzhniki Stadium; Attendance: 11,000; Referee: Mikhail Hodyrev |

| 21 April 2002 8 | Spartak Moscow | 0 – 3 | CSKA Moscow | Moscow |
| 17:00 MSK (DST) (UTC+4) | | Report | Solomatin 11'; Gusev 41' (pen.) (yellow card) 42'; Laizāns 53'; Rahimić (yellow card) 89' | Stadium: Luzhniki Stadium; Attendance: 40,000; Referee: Valentin Ivanov |

| 28 April 2002 9 | Alania Vladikavkaz | 4 – 3 | Spartak Moscow | Vladikavkaz |
| 16:00 MSK (DST) (UTC+4) | Paulo 14', 45'; Tarlowski (yellow card) 20'; Sviderskyi (yellow card) 39'; Bazayev 67'; Imedadze 83'; Bitarov (yellow card) 85' | Report | Sychev 25'; Tsykhmeystruk 26'; Moisés (yellow card) 53'; Beschastnykh 58'; Kébé (yellow card) 75' | Stadium: Republican Stadium; Attendance: 33,000; Referee: Igor Egorov |

| 4 May 2002 10 | Spartak Moscow | 0 – 2 | Uralan Elista | Moscow |
| 16:00 MSK (DST) (UTC+4) | Mitreski (yellow card) 26'; Tchuissé (yellow card) 39'; Parfenov (yellow card) 62' | Report | Tsiklauri 9', 48'; Kolodin (yellow card) 23'; Gashkin (yellow card) 42'; Lovchev (yellow card) 85' | Stadium: Luzhniki Stadium; Attendance: 6,000; Referee: Nikolai Ivanov |

| 8 May 2002 11 | Saturn-REN TV | 1 – 2 | Spartak Moscow | Ramenskoye |
| 19:00 MSK (DST) (UTC+4) | Kechinov 77'; Lyapkin (yellow card) 86' | Report | Ananko (yellow card) 65'; Sychev 80'; Beschastnykh 87' (pen.) | Stadium: Saturn Stadium; Attendance: 15,000; Referee: Yuri Klyuchnikov |

| 13 May 2002 12 | Spartak Moscow | 2 – 1 | Sokol Saratov | Moscow |
| 19:00 MSK (DST) (UTC+4) | Parfenov (yellow card) 14' (goal) 57'; Titov 43' | Report | Samoylov 24' | Stadium: Eduard Streltsov Stadium; Attendance: 6,000; Referee: Taras Bezubyak |

| 3 July 2002 13 | Torpedo-ZIL Moscow | 0 – 2 | Spartak Moscow | Moscow |
| 17:00 MSK (DST) (UTC+4) | D.N.Smirnov (yellow card) 24'; Lakić (yellow card) 77' | Report | Moisés (yellow card) 25'; Beschastnykh 36' (pen.), 42' | Stadium: Eduard Streltsov Stadium; Attendance: 6,000; Referee: Sergey Zuev |

| 10 July 2002 14 | Spartak Moscow | 4 – 3 | Zenit St.Petersburg | Moscow |
| 17:00 MSK (DST) (UTC+4) | Beschastnykh 51' (pen.), 58'; Ananko (yellow card) 63'; Kébé 64'; Sychev 69' (yellow card) 69' | Report | Kerzhakov 5', 60'; Arshavin 47'; Tarasov (yellow card) 78' | Stadium: Luzhniki Stadium; Attendance: 9,000; Referee: Igor Egorov |

| 15 July 2002 15 | Dynamo Moscow | 0 – 1 | Spartak Moscow | Moscow |
| 17:00 MSK (DST) (UTC+4) | Tochilin (yellow card) 74'; Koroman (yellow card) 90' | Report | Baranov (yellow card) 30'; Mitreski (yellow card) 46'; Beschastnykh (yellow card) 49' (goal) 83' (pen.); Parfenov (yellow card) 53' | Stadium: Dynamo Stadium; Attendance: 13,000; Referee: Valery Shaveyko |

| 24 July 2002 16 | Spartak Moscow | 2 – 1 | Torpedo-ZIL Moscow | Moscow |
| 19:00 MSK (DST) (UTC+4) | Kudryashov 46', 73'; Titov (yellow card) 87' | Report | Kamnev (yellow card) 54'; Sherstnyov 59'; Bakayev (yellow card) 85' | Stadium: Eduard Streltsov Stadium; Attendance: 7,000; Referee: Aleksandr Kolobaev |

| 30 July 2002 17 | Zenit St.Petersburg | 0 – 1 | Spartak Moscow | Saint Petersburg |
| 17:00 MSK (DST) (UTC+4) | Nedorezov (yellow card) 66'; Mudrinić (yellow card) 68' | Report | Titov (yellow card) 12'; Mitreski (yellow card) 29'; Moisés (yellow card) 44'; Kudryashov (yellow card) 70'; Beschastnykh 78'; Ananko (yellow card) 78'; Essien (yellow card) 89' | Stadium: Petrovsky Stadium; Attendance: 21,500; Referee: Stanislav Sukhina |

| 3 August 2002 18 | Spartak Moscow | 1 – 0 | Dynamo Moscow | Moscow |
| 16:00 MSK (DST) (UTC+4) | Kébé (yellow card) 40'; Danishevsky 66' | Report | | Stadium: Eduard Streltsov Stadium; Attendance: 9,000; Referee: Valentin Ivanov |

| 11 August 2002 19 | Sokol Saratov | 2 – 2 | Spartak Moscow | Saratov |
| 19:00 MSK (DST) (UTC+4) | Adiyev (yellow card) 6'; Bugakov (yellow card) 8'; Sakiyev 23'; Baltiev 33' | Report | Kébé (yellow card) 35'; Ananko (yellow card) 50'; Kovtun (yellow card) 58'; Moisés 66'; Sychev (yellow card) 80'; Beschastnykh 88' | Stadium: Lokomotiv Stadium; Attendance: 15,800; Referee: Alexander Evstigneev |

| 16 August 2002 20 | Spartak Moscow | 2 – 1 | Alania Vladikavkaz | Moscow |
| 19:00 MSK (DST) (UTC+4) | Moisés (yellow card) 32'; Kébé 55', 61' | Report | Demetradze 16' (yellow card) 47' | Stadium: Eduard Streltsov Stadium; Attendance: 8,000; Referee: Alexey Tyumin |

| 25 August 2002 21 | Uralan Elista | 1 – 1 | Spartak Moscow | Elista |
| 19:00 MSK (DST) (UTC+4) | Chugainov (yellow card) 5'; Semochko (yellow card) 35'; Ospeshinskiy 90' | Report | Moisés (yellow card) 14'; Essien 16'; Kovtun (yellow card) 48'; Bezrodny (yellow card) 57' | Stadium: Uralan Stadium; Attendance: 9,000; Referee: Yuri Chebotaryov |

| 31 August 2002 22 | Spartak Moscow | 0 – 2 | Saturn-REN TV | Moscow |
| 16:00 MSK (DST) (UTC+4) | Bezrodny (yellow card) 15'; Kébé (yellow card) 53' | Report | Kurayev (yellow card) 12'; Mikadze (yellow card) 22'; Rogaciov 27'; Melyoshin (yellow card) 39'; Muratović (yellow card) 53'; Medvedev 62'; Sosnovschi (yellow card) 83' | Stadium: Eduard Streltsov Stadium; Attendance: 7,500; Referee: Nikolai Ivanov |

| 12 September 2002 23 | Lokomotiv Moscow | 1 – 1 | Spartak Moscow | Moscow |
| 17:00 MSK (DST) (UTC+4) | Loskov (yellow card) 23'; Júlio César 33'; Nizhegorodov (yellow card) 36'; Lekgetho (yellow card) 79'; Ovchinnikov (yellow card) 90' | Report | Kébé (yellow card) 2' (yellow-red card) 90'; Kalynychenko 38'; Khlestov (yellow card) 57' | Stadium: Lokomotiv Stadium; Attendance: 23,000; Referee: Valentin Ivanov |

| 21 September 2002 24 | Rostselmash | 1 – 1 | Spartak Moscow | Rostov-on-Don |
| 16:00 MSK (DST) (UTC+4) | Karpovich (yellow card) 65'; Fomenka (yellow card) 77'; Booth (yellow card) 78'; Maslov 90' | Report | Kovtun (yellow card) 21'; Beschastnykh 76' (pen.); Danishevsky (yellow card) 84' | Stadium: Olimp-2; Attendance: 12,000; Referee: Aleksandr Gvardis |

| 28 September 2002 25 | Shinnik Yaroslavl | 2 – 2 | Spartak Moscow | Yaroslavl |
| MSK (DST) (UTC+4) | Grishin (yellow card) 23'; Khomukha 45' (pen.); Fuzailov 54' | Report | Kudryashov 42', 68'; Moisés (yellow card) 88' | Stadium: Shinnik Stadium; Attendance: 25,000; Referee: Vladimir Vlasov |

| 6 October 2002 26 | Spartak Moscow | 3 – 1 | Krylia Sovetov | Moscow |
| 17:00 MSK (DST) (UTC+4) | Beschastnykh 26' (pen.); Sonin (yellow card) 28' (goal) 78'; Mitreski (yellow card) 42'; Abramidze (yellow card) 73'; Bezrodny (yellow card) 82' (goal) 86' | Report | Karyaka 66'; Bushmanov (yellow card) 87' | Stadium: Eduard Streltsov Stadium; Attendance: 4,000; Referee: Stanislav Sukhina |

| 26 October 2002 27 | Rotor Volgograd | 0 – 3 | Spartak Moscow | Volgograd |
| 9,800 MSK (DST) (UTC+4) | Zubko (yellow card) 37'; Trifonov (yellow card) 43'; Mysin (yellow card) 65' | Report | Danishevsky 16', 36'; Pavlenko (yellow card) 23'; Sonin 27'; Kovtun (yellow card) 31'; Moisés (yellow card) 77' | Stadium: Central Stadium; Attendance: 9,800; Referee: Yury Chebotaryov |

| 2 November 2002 28 | Spartak Moscow | 2 – 1 | Anzhi Makhachkala | Moscow |
| MSK (UTC+3) | Baranov (yellow card) 13'; Kovtun 25'; Essien (yellow card) 46'; Danishevsky (yellow card) 47'; Danishevsky 50' | Report | Babych 5'; Bamatov (yellow card) 9' | Stadium: Eduard Streltsov Stadium; Attendance: 9,000; Referee: Taras Bezubyak |

| 9 November 2002 29 | CSKA Moscow | 2 – 1 | Spartak Moscow | Moscow |
| 16:00 MSK (UTC+3) | Solomatin (yellow card) 10'; Semak 34'; Yanovsky (yellow card) 38' (goal) 62'; Yevsikov (yellow card) 75'; Laizāns (yellow card) 87' | Report | Kalynychenko (yellow card) 6' (yellow-red card) 41'; Bezrodny (yellow card) 54'; Danishevsky (yellow card) 57'; Kudryashov 69'; Moisés (yellow card) 85'; Ogunsania (yellow card) 88' | Stadium: Eduard Streltsov Stadium; Attendance: 9,000; Referee: Nikolai Ivanov |

| 17 November 2002 30 | Spartak Moscow | 0 – 1 | Torpedo Moscow | Moscow |
| 16:00 MSK (DST) (UTC+4) | | Report | Kormiltsev 36' | Stadium: Luzhniki Stadium; Attendance: 3,500; Referee: Yuri Baskakov |

==== League table ====
| Pos | Team | Pld | W | D | L | GF | GA | GD | Pts | Qualification or relegation |
|---|---|---|---|---|---|---|---|---|---|---|
| 1 | Lokomotiv Moscow (C) | 30 | 19 | 9 | 2 | 46 | 14 | +32 | 66 | Qualification to Champions League third qualifying round (Note: The title was decided in a championship playoff as Lokomotiv Moscow and CSKA Moscow finished with equal points.) |
| 2 | CSKA Moscow | 30 | 21 | 3 | 6 | 60 | 26 | +34 | 66 | Qualification to Champions League second qualifying round |
| 3 | Spartak Moscow | 30 | 16 | 7 | 7 | 49 | 36 | +13 | 55 | Qualification to UEFA Cup first round |
| 4 | Torpedo Moscow (Note: Torpedo qualified for the UEFA Cup thanks to Spartak winning the Russian Cup in 2003.) | 30 | 14 | 8 | 8 | 47 | 32 | +15 | 50 | Qualification to UEFA Cup qualifying round |
| 5 | Krylia Sovetov Samara | 30 | 15 | 4 | 11 | 39 | 32 | +7 | 49 | |

Source: RFPL
Rules for classification: 1) points; 2) goal difference; 3) number of goals scored.
(C) Champions

=== Russian Cup ===
==== 2002-03 ====
| 29 June 2002 Round of 32 | Chkalovets-1936 | 0 – 4 | Spartak Moscow | Novosibirsk |
| 16:00 MSK (DST) (UTC+4) | Shtyn (yellow card) 17' | Report | Beschastnykh 16' (pen.), 38'; Sychev (yellow card) 42' (goal) 90'; Baranov 73'; Tchuissé (yellow card) 74' | Stadium: Spartak Stadium; Attendance: 17,000; Referee: Aleksandr Gonchar |

| 18 October 2002 Round of 16 | Spartak Moscow | 4 – 0 | Uralan Elista | Moscow |
| 15:00 MSK (DST) (UTC+4) | Khlestov (yellow card) 39'; Sonin 47'; Kalynychenko 57', 75'; Bezrodny 87' | Report | Ajinjal (yellow card) 53'; Todua (red card) 78' | Stadium: Spartak Stadium; Attendance: 1,000; Referee: Aleksandr Evstigneev |

Quarterfinal took place during the 2003 season.

=== UEFA Champions League ===
==== Group stage ====
| Team | Pld | W | D | L | GF | GA | GD | Pts |
|---|---|---|---|---|---|---|---|---|
| (Spain) Valencia | 6 | 5 | 1 | 0 | 17 | 4 | +13 | 16 |
| (Switzerland) Basel | 6 | 2 | 3 | 1 | 12 | 12 | 0 | 9 |
| (England) Liverpool | 6 | 2 | 2 | 2 | 12 | 8 | +4 | 8 |
| (Russia) Spartak Moscow | 6 | 0 | 0 | 6 | 1 | 18 | −17 | 0 |

| 17 September 2002 1 | Basel (Switzerland) | 2 – 0 | (Russia) Spartak Moscow | Basel, Switzerland |
| 22:45 MSK (DST) (UTC+4) | H.Yakin 50'; Rossi 55' | Report | Moisés (yellow card) 71' | Stadium: St. Jakob-Park; Attendance: 29,500; Referee: Claus Bo Larsen (Denmark) |

| 25 September 2002 2 | Spartak Moscow (Russia) | 0 – 3 | (Spain) Valencia | Moscow, Russia |
| 22:45 MSK (DST) (UTC+4) | Moisés (yellow card) 14'; Mitreski (yellow card) 36'; Kébé (yellow card) 44' | Report | Angulo 6'; Mista 71'; Juan Sánchez 85' | Stadium: Dynamo Stadium; Attendance: 10,500; Referee: Stéphane Bré (France) |

| 2 October 2002 3 | Liverpool (England) | 5 – 0 | (Russia) Spartak Moscow | Liverpool, England |
| 22:45 MSK (DST) (UTC+4) | Heskey 7', 89'; Henchoz (yellow card) 11'; Cheyrou 15'; Hyypiä 28'; Diao 81' | Report | Kudryashov (yellow card) 14'; Moisés (yellow card) 27'; Mitreski (yellow card) 36'; Kébé (yellow card) 56'; Kovtun (yellow card) 58' | Stadium: Anfield; Attendance: 40,812; Referee: Alain Hamer (Luxembourg) |

| 22 October 2002 4 | Spartak Moscow (Russia) | 1 – 3 | (England) Liverpool | Moscow, Russia |
| 22:45 MSK (DST) (UTC+4) | Danishevsky 23'; Kalynychenko (yellow card) 31'; Khlestov (yellow card) 76' | Report | Owen 29', 70', 90+1' | Stadium: Dynamo Stadium; Attendance: 10,000; Referee: Konrad Plautz (Austria) |

| 5 November 2002 5 | Spartak Moscow (Russia) | 0 – 2 | (Switzerland) Basel | Moscow, Russia |
| 20:00 MSK (UTC+3) | Kovtun (yellow card) 65'; Torbinski (yellow card) 73' | Report | Rossi 18'; Giménez (yellow card) 84' (goal) 89' | Stadium: Dynamo Stadium; Attendance: 5,000; Referee: Stuart Dougal (Scotland) |

| 12 November 2002 6 | Valencia (Spain) | 3 – 0 | (Russia) Spartak Moscow | Valencia, Spain |
| 22:45 MSK (UTC+3) | Juan Sánchez 38', 46'; Aurélio 78' | Report | Kudryashov (yellow card) 43'; Mitreski (yellow card) 49'; Abramidze (yellow card) 58'; Kovtun (yellow card) 62'; Ogunsania (yellow card) 78' | Stadium: Mestalla Stadium; Attendance: 27,000; Referee: Georgios Kasnaferis (Greece) |

== Squad statistics ==
As of match played 17 November 2002

=== Appearances and goals ===
| No. | Pos | Nat | Player | Total | | Premier League | | 2002-03 Russian Cup | | UEFA Champions League | |
| No. | Pos | Nat | Player | Apps | Goals | Apps | Goals | Apps | Goals | Apps | Goals |
|---|---|---|---|---|---|---|---|---|---|---|---|
| 1 | GK | (Ukraine) UKR | Maksym Levytskyi | 24 | 0 | 19 | 0 | 2 | 0 | 3 | 0 |
| 2 | DF | (Russia) RUS | Yuri Kovtun | 23 | 1 | 16 | 1 | 1 | 0 | 6 | 0 |
| 3 | DF | (Senegal) SEN | Ibra Kébé | 31 | 3 | 21+3 | 3 | 1+1 | 0 | 4+1 | 0 |
| 4 | DF | (Cameroon) CMR | Jerry-Christian Tchuissé | 15 | 0 | 12 | 0 | 1 | 0 | 2 | 0 |
| 6 | DF | (Russia) RUS | Dmitri Ananko | 21 | 0 | 18+3 | 0 | 0 | 0 | 0 | 0 |
| 7 | MF | (Belarus) BLR | Vasili Baranov | 27 | 2 | 24 | 1 | 1 | 1 | 1+1 | 0 |
| 8 | MF | (Brazil) BRA | Marcelo Silva | 5 | 0 | 1+1 | 0 | 0 | 0 | 0+3 | 0 |
| 9 | MF | (Russia) RUS | Yegor Titov | 21 | 4 | 20 | 4 | 1 | 0 | 0 | 0 |
| 10 | MF | (Ukraine) UKR | Eduard Tsykhmeystruk | 21 | 2 | 20 | 2 | 1 | 0 | 0 | 0 |
| 11 | FW | (Russia) RUS | Vladimir Beschastnykh | 38 | 14 | 30 | 12 | 2 | 2 | 6 | 0 |
| 13 | MF | (Russia) RUS | Dmitri Kudryashov | 29 | 5 | 18+4 | 5 | 1 | 0 | 4+2 | 0 |
| 14 | MF | (Ukraine) UKR | Maksym Kalynychenko | 19 | 3 | 7+4 | 1 | 1+1 | 2 | 6 | 0 |
| 16 | FW | (Russia) RUS | Pavel Pogrebnyak | 2 | 0 | 0+2 | 0 | 0 | 0 | 0 | 0 |
| 18 | DF | (Ukraine) UKR | Dmytro Parfenov | 16 | 2 | 16 | 2 | 0 | 0 | 0 | 0 |
| 19 | FW | (Russia) RUS | Dmitri Sychev | 19 | 10 | 16+2 | 9 | 1 | 1 | 0 | 0 |
| 20 | FW | (Russia) RUS | Aleksandr Danishevsky | 28 | 5 | 4+17 | 4 | 1 | 0 | 6 | 1 |
| 21 | MF | (Russia) RUS | Artyom Bezrodny | 11 | 2 | 4+2 | 1 | 1 | 1 | 3+1 | 0 |
| 23 | MF | (Russia) RUS | Pyotr Nemov | 2 | 0 | 2 | 0 | 0 | 0 | 0 | 0 |
| 24 | MF | (Russia) RUS | Andrei Streltsov | 4 | 0 | 1+3 | 0 | 0 | 0 | 0 | 0 |
| 25 | MF | (Russia) RUS | Aleksandr Pavlenko | 11 | 0 | 4+1 | 0 | 1+1 | 0 | 4 | 0 |
| 26 | MF | (Russia) RUS | Aleksandr Sheshukov | 2 | 0 | 1+1 | 0 | 0 | 0 | 0 | 0 |
| 29 | DF | (North Macedonia) MKD | Igor Mitreski | 34 | 0 | 27 | 0 | 1 | 0 | 4+2 | 0 |
| 30 | FW | (Russia) RUS | Aleksandr Sonin | 12 | 3 | 3+5 | 2 | 1+1 | 1 | 1+1 | 0 |
| 34 | DF | (Brazil) BRA | Moisés | 30 | 1 | 19+4 | 1 | 2 | 0 | 5 | 0 |
| 39 | MF | (Russia) RUS | Aleksei Rebko | 2 | 0 | 0+1 | 0 | 0+1 | 0 | 0 | 0 |
| 40 | MF | (Russia) RUS | Aleksandr Samedov | 1 | 0 | 1 | 0 | 0 | 0 | 0 | 0 |
| 41 | MF | (Russia) RUS | Dmitri Torbinski | 6 | 0 | 0+3 | 0 | 0+1 | 0 | 0+2 | 0 |
| 42 | FW | (Nigeria) NGA | Okon Flo Essien | 11 | 1 | 6+3 | 1 | 0 | 0 | 0+2 | 0 |
| 44 | DF | (Georgia (country)) GEO | Valeri Abramidze | 11 | 0 | 4+2 | 0 | 1 | 0 | 3+1 | 0 |
| 45 | GK | (Russia) RUS | Stanislav Cherchesov | 10 | 0 | 6+1 | 0 | 0 | 0 | 3 | 0 |
| 48 | DF | (Nigeria) NGA | Samuel Ogunsania | 2 | 0 | 0+1 | 0 | 0 | 0 | 0+1 | 0 |
| 51 | DF | (Jamaica) JAM | Robert Scarlett | 1 | 0 | 0+1 | 0 | 0 | 0 | 0 | 0 |
| 55 | DF | (Russia) RUS | Dmitri Khlestov | 12 | 0 | 5+1 | 0 | 1 | 0 | 5 | 0 |
Players away from the club on loan:
| 15 | FW | (Belarus) BLR | Raman Vasilyuk | 1 | 0 | 0+1 | 0 | 0 | 0 | 0 | 0 |
Players who appeared for Spartak Moscow but left during the season:
| 22 | GK | (Russia) RUS | Dmitri Goncharov | 6 | 0 | 5+1 | 0 | 0 | 0 | 0 | 0 |

=== Goal scorers ===
| Place | Position | Nation | Number | Name | Premier League | 2002-03 Russian Cup | UEFA Champions League | Total |
|---|---|---|---|---|---|---|---|---|
| 1 | FW | (Russia) | 11 | Vladimir Beschastnykh | 12 | 2 | 0 | 14 |
| 2 | FW | (Russia) | 19 | Dmitri Sychev | 9 | 1 | 0 | 10 |
| 3 | MF | (Russia) | 13 | Dmitri Kudryashov | 5 | 0 | 0 | 5 |
| 3 | FW | (Russia) | 20 | Aleksandr Danishevsky | 4 | 0 | 1 | 5 |
| 5 | MF | (Russia) | 9 | Yegor Titov | 4 | 0 | 0 | 4 |
| 6 | DF | (Senegal) | 3 | Ibra Kébé | 3 | 0 | 0 | 3 |
| 6 | FW | (Russia) | 30 | Aleksandr Sonin | 2 | 1 | 0 | 3 |
| 6 | MF | (Ukraine) | 14 | Maksym Kalynychenko | 1 | 2 | 0 | 3 |
| 9 | MF | (Ukraine) | 10 | Eduard Tsykhmeystruk | 2 | 0 | 0 | 2 |
| 9 | DF | (Ukraine) | 18 | Dmytro Parfenov | 2 | 0 | 0 | 2 |
| 9 | MF | (Belarus) | 7 | Vasili Baranov | 1 | 1 | 0 | 2 |
| 9 | FW | (Russia) | 21 | Artyom Bezrodny | 1 | 1 | 0 | 2 |
| 13 | DF | (Brazil) | 34 | Moisés Moura | 1 | 0 | 0 | 1 |
| 13 | FW | (Nigeria) | 42 | Okon Flo Essien | 1 | 0 | 0 | 1 |
| 13 | DF | (Russia) | 2 | Yuri Kovtun | 1 | 0 | 0 | 1 |
| Total | | | | | 49 | 8 | 1 | 58 |

=== Clean sheets ===
| Place | Position | Nation | Number | Name | Premier League | 2002-03 Russian Cup | UEFA Champions League | Total |
|---|---|---|---|---|---|---|---|---|
| 1 | GK | (Ukraine) | 1 | Maksym Levytskyi | 8 | 2 | 0 | 10 |
| 2 | GK | (Russia) | 22 | Dmitri Goncharov | 2 | 0 | 0 | 2 |
| TOTALS | | | | | 9 | 2 | 0 | 11 |

Levytskyi & Goncharov both played in Spartak's 3-0 victory over Shinnik Yaroslavl on 12 March 2002.

=== Disciplinary record ===
| Number | Nation | Position | Name | Premier League | | 2002-03 Russian Cup | | UEFA Champions League | | Total | |
| Number | Nation | Position | Name | Booked | Sent off (straight red) | Booked | Sent off (straight red) | Booked | Sent off (straight red) | Booked | Sent off (straight red) |
|---|---|---|---|---|---|---|---|---|---|---|---|
| 2 | (Russia) | DF | Yuri Kovtun | 6 | 1 | 0 | 0 | 4 | 0 | 10 | 1 |
| 3 | (Senegal) | DF | Ibra Kébé | 8 | 1 | 0 | 0 | 2 | 0 | 10 | 1 |
| 4 | (Cameroon) | DF | Jerry-Christian Tchuissé | 1 | 0 | 1 | 0 | 0 | 0 | 2 | 0 |
| 6 | (Russia) | DF | Dmitri Ananko | 6 | 0 | 0 | 0 | 0 | 0 | 6 | 0 |
| 7 | (Belarus) | MF | Vasili Baranov | 2 | 0 | 0 | 0 | 0 | 0 | 2 | 0 |
| 9 | (Russia) | MF | Yegor Titov | 4 | 0 | 0 | 0 | 0 | 0 | 4 | 0 |
| 11 | (Russia) | FW | Vladimir Beschastnykh | 2 | 0 | 0 | 0 | 0 | 0 | 2 | 0 |
| 13 | (Russia) | MF | Dmitri Kudryashov | 2 | 0 | 0 | 0 | 2 | 0 | 4 | 0 |
| 14 | (Ukraine) | MF | Maksym Kalynychenko | 2 | 1 | 0 | 0 | 1 | 0 | 3 | 1 |
| 18 | (Ukraine) | DF | Dmytro Parfenov | 6 | 0 | 0 | 0 | 0 | 0 | 6 | 0 |
| 19 | (Russia) | FW | Dmitri Sychev | 2 | 0 | 1 | 0 | 0 | 0 | 3 | 0 |
| 20 | (Russia) | FW | Aleksandr Danishevsky | 3 | 0 | 0 | 0 | 0 | 0 | 3 | 0 |
| 21 | (Russia) | MF | Artyom Bezrodny | 4 | 0 | 0 | 0 | 0 | 0 | 4 | 0 |
| 25 | (Ukraine) | MF | Aleksandr Pavlenko | 1 | 0 | 0 | 0 | 0 | 0 | 1 | 0 |
| 29 | (North Macedonia) | DF | Igor Mitreski | 4 | 0 | 0 | 0 | 3 | 0 | 7 | 0 |
| 30 | (Russia) | FW | Aleksandr Sonin | 1 | 0 | 0 | 0 | 0 | 0 | 1 | 0 |
| 34 | (Brazil) | DF | Moisés | 8 | 0 | 0 | 0 | 3 | 0 | 11 | 0 |
| 41 | (Russia) | MF | Dmitri Torbinski | 0 | 0 | 0 | 0 | 1 | 0 | 1 | 0 |
| 42 | (Nigeria) | FW | Okon Flo Essien | 2 | 0 | 0 | 0 | 0 | 0 | 2 | 0 |
| 44 | (Georgia (country)) | DF | Valeri Abramidze | 1 | 0 | 0 | 0 | 1 | 0 | 2 | 0 |
| 48 | (Nigeria) | DF | Samuel Ogunsania | 1 | 0 | 0 | 0 | 1 | 0 | 2 | 0 |
| 55 | (Russia) | DF | Dmitri Khlestov | 1 | 0 | 1 | 0 | 1 | 0 | 3 | 0 |
Players away on loan:
Players who left Spartak Moscow season during the season:
| 10 | (Ukraine) | MF | Eduard Tsykhmeystruk | 1 | 0 | 0 | 0 | 0 | 0 | 1 | 0 |
| Total | | | | 68 | 3 | 3 | 0 | 19 | 0 | 90 | 3 |
