= 2002 Russian Premier League =

11th season of top-tier football league in Russia

Russian Premier League
- Season: 2002
- Champions: Lokomotiv Moscow; 1st title
- Relegated: Anzhi Makhachkala; Sokol Saratov
- Champions League: Lokomotiv Moscow; CSKA Moscow
- UEFA Cup: Spartak Moscow; Torpedo Moscow
- Matches: 240
- Goals: 584 (2.43 per match)
- Top goalscorer: Rolan Gusev & Dmitri Kirichenko (15)

2002 was the first season of the Russian Premier League. While the structure of the competition did not change, the top level clubs gained independence from the Professional Football League.

Spartak's six-year dominance in the league was broken by Lokomotiv.

== Teams ==
As in the previous season, 16 teams are playing in the 2002 season, with the name of the league changing from the 'Top Division' to the 'Premier League'. After the 2001 season, Fakel Voronezh and Chernomorets Novorossiysk were relegated to the 2002 Russian First Division. They were replaced by Uralan Elista and Shinnik Yaroslavl, the winners and runners up of the 2001 Russian First Division.

=== Venues ===
Alania	Anzhi	CSKA	Dynamo
Republican Spartak Stadium	Dynamo Stadium	Central Stadium	Central Stadium
Capacity: 32,464	Capacity: 15,200	Capacity: 36,540	Capacity: 36,540
Lokomotiv Moscow	Locations of teams in 2002 Russian Premier League		Krylia Sovetov Samara
RZD Arena	Locations of teams in 2002 Russian Premier League		Metallurg Stadium
Capacity: 27,084	Locations of teams in 2002 Russian Premier League		Capacity: 33,001
Rostselmash	Locations of teams in 2002 Russian Premier League		Rotor
Olimp-2	Locations of teams in 2002 Russian Premier League		Central Stadium
Capacity: 15,840	Locations of teams in 2002 Russian Premier League		Capacity: 32,120
Saturn	Locations of teams in 2002 Russian Premier League		Shinnik
Saturn Stadium	Locations of teams in 2002 Russian Premier League		Shinnik Stadium
Capacity: 14,685	Locations of teams in 2002 Russian Premier League		Capacity: 22,871
Sokol	Locations of teams in 2002 Russian Premier League		Spartak
Lokomotiv Stadium	Locations of teams in 2002 Russian Premier League		Luzhniki Stadium
Capacity: 15,000	Locations of teams in 2002 Russian Premier League		Capacity: 81,029
Torpedo	Torpedo-ZIL	Uralan	Zenit Saint Petersburg
Luzhniki Stadium	Eduard Streltsov Stadium	Uralan Stadium	Petrovsky Stadium
Capacity: 81,029	Capacity: 13,450	Capacity:	Capacity: 21,570

=== Personnel and kits ===
Team	Location	Head coach	Kit manufacturer	Shirt sponsor
Alania	Vladikavkaz	(Russia) Bakhva Tedeyev	(Germany) Adidas	-
Anzhi	Makhachkala	(Russia) Gadzhi Gadzhiyev	(United States) Nike	-
CSKA	Moscow	(Russia) Valery Gazzaev	(United Kingdom) Umbro	-
Dynamo	Moscow	(Ukraine) Viktor Prokopenko	(United States) Nike	-
Lokomotiv	Moscow	(Russia) Yuri Semin	(United States) Nike	MZD
Krylia	Samara	(Russia) Aleksandr Tarkhanov	(United Kingdom) Umbro	-
Rostselmash	Rostov-on-Don	(Russia) Sergei Balakhnin (Caretaker)	(Italy) Diadora	Alfa-Eko
Rotor	Volgograd	(Russia) Vladimir Salkov	(United Kingdom) Umbro	-
Saturn	Ramenskoye	(Russia) Vladimir Shevchuk	(United States) Nike	-
Shinnik	Yaroslavl	(Russia) Aleksandr Pobegalov	(United States) Nike	Yaroslavl Tire Plant
Sokol	Saratov	(Russia) Leonid Tkachenko	(United Kingdom) Umbro	-
Spartak	Moscow	(Russia) Oleg Romantsev	(Germany) Adidas	Lukoil
Torpedo	Moscow	(Russia) Sergei Petrenko	(Italy) Diadora	-
Torpedo-ZIL	Moscow	(Russia) Vadim Nikonov	(United Kingdom) Umbro	ZiL
Uralan	Elista	(Georgia (country)) Revaz Dzodzuashvili	(Italy) Lotto	-
Zenit	Saint Petersburg	(Russia) Boris Rappoport	(Italy) Diadora	Gazprom

=== Managerial changes ===
Team	Outgoing manager	Manner of departure	Date of vacancy	Position in table	Replaced by	Date of appointment	Position in table
Dynamo	(Russia) Aleksandr Novikov		April 2002		(Ukraine) Viktor Prokopenko	April 2002	
Sokol	(Russia) Alexander Koreshkov		April 2002		(Russia) Anatoli Aslamov (Caretaker)	April 2002	
Zenit	(Russia) Yury Morozov		April 2002		(Russia) Mikhail Biryukov (Caretaker)	April 2002	
Anzhi	(Russia) Leonid Tkachenko		May 2002		(Russia) Aleksandr Reshetnyak (Caretaker)	May 2002	
Sokol	(Russia) Anatoli Aslamov (Caretaker)		May 2002		(Russia) Leonid Tkachenko	May 2002	
Anzhi	(Russia) Aleksandr Reshetnyak (Caretaker)		June 2002		(Ukraine) Myron Markevych	June 2002	
Alania	(Ukraine) Vladimir Muntyan		July 2002		(Russia) Bakhva Tedeyev	July 2002	
Torpedo	(Russia) Vitaly Shevchenko		July 2002		(Russia) Sergei Petrenko	July 2002	
Zenit	(Russia) Mikhail Biryukov (Caretaker)		July 2002		(Russia) Yury Morozov	July 2002	
Zenit	(Russia) Yury Morozov		July 2002		(Russia) Mikhail Biryukov (Caretaker)	July 2002	
Anzhi	(Ukraine) Myron Markevych		August 2002		(Russia) Aleksandr Reshetnyak (Caretaker)	August 2002	
Anzhi	(Russia) Aleksandr Reshetnyak (Caretaker)		August 2002		(Russia) Gadzhi Gadzhiyev	August 2002	
Rostselmash	(Russia) Anatoly Baidachny		August 2002		(Russia) Sergei Balakhnin (Caretaker)	August 2002	
Uralan	(Russia) Sergei Pavlov		August 2002		(Russia) Yuri Shishlov (Caretaker)	August 2002	
Uralan	(Russia) Yuri Shishlov (Caretaker)		August 2002		(Georgia (country)) Revaz Dzodzuashvili	August 2002	
Zenit	(Russia) Mikhail Biryukov (Caretaker)		August 2002		(Russia) Boris Rappoport	August 2002	

== Standings ==
Pos	Team	Pld	W	D	L	GF	GA	GD	Pts	Qualification or relegation
1	Lokomotiv Moscow (C)	30	19	9	2	46	14	+32	66	Qualification to Champions League third qualifying round (Note: The title was decided in a championship playoff as Lokomotiv Moscow and CSKA Moscow finished with equal points.)
2	CSKA Moscow	30	21	3	6	60	26	+34	66	Qualification to Champions League second qualifying round
3	Spartak Moscow	30	16	7	7	49	36	+13	55	Qualification to UEFA Cup first round
4	Torpedo Moscow (Note: Torpedo qualified for the UEFA Cup thanks to Spartak winning the Russian Cup in 2003.)	30	14	8	8	47	32	+15	50	Qualification to UEFA Cup qualifying round
5	Krylia Sovetov Samara	30	15	4	11	39	32	+7	49	
6	Saturn	30	13	8	9	41	37	+4	47	
7	Shinnik Yaroslavl	30	13	8	9	42	37	+5	47	
8	Dynamo Moscow	30	12	6	12	38	33	+5	42	
9	Rotor Volgograd	30	11	5	14	27	34	−7	38	
10	Zenit St. Petersburg	30	8	9	13	36	42	−6	33	
11	Rostselmash	30	7	10	13	29	49	−20	31	
12	Alania Vladikavkaz	30	8	6	16	31	42	−11	30	
13	Uralan Elista	30	6	11	13	32	42	−10	29	
14	Torpedo-ZIL Moscow	30	6	10	14	20	39	−19	28	
15	Anzhi Makhachkala (R)	30	5	10	15	22	43	−21	25	Relegation to First Division
16	Sokol Saratov (R)	30	5	8	17	24	45	−21	23	Relegation to First Division

Source: RFPL
Rules for classification: 1) points; 2) goal difference; 3) number of goals scored.
(C) Champions; (R) Relegated

=== Championship play-off ===
21 November 2002
18:00 UTC+3

Lokomotiv Moscow	1–0	CSKA Moscow
Loskov 6'	Report

Dynamo Stadium, Moscow
Attendance: 34,000
Referee: Valentin Ivanov

== Results ==
Home \ Away	ALA	ANZ	CSK	DYN	KRY	LOK	ROS	ROT	SAT	SHI	SOK	SPA	TOR	TZM	URE	ZEN
Alania Vladikavkaz		1–1	0–1	1–2	1–4	1–1	2–1	0–1	0–1	2–1	3–2	4–3	1–1	5–2	2–3	1–0
Anzhi Makhachkala	0–1		2–1	0–1	0–2	0–0	4–1	2–1	1–1	0–1	0–1	3–3	0–1	0–0	1–1	2–0
CSKA Moscow	1–0	3–1		2–3	2–0	0–1	5–1	2–0	2–3	2–0	3–0	2–1	2–3	4–0	2–1	1–0
Dynamo Moscow	0–1	2–0	1–2		0–1	1–2	5–0	2–3	1–1	0–1	2–1	0–1	3–3	1–1	1–0	0–2
Krylia Sovetov Samara	1–0	4–0	0–2	0–0		1–0	3–2	1–0	1–0	4–1	0–1	0–2	1–0	0–0	1–1	1–0
Lokomotiv Moscow	1–0	0–0	0–0	3–0	2–0		3–0	3–0	2–0	2–1	2–0	1–1	1–0	3–0	1–0	2–1
Rostselmash	1–1	2–0	3–2	1–1	0–3	2–3		0–3	2–1	1–1	1–1	1–1	0–1	1–1	2–0	1–2
Rotor Volgograd	2–1	0–0	0–1	0–0	2–0	0–2	0–0		1–1	2–0	2–1	0–3	1–0	0–0	2–0	2–1
Saturn	1–0	1–1	0–3	0–3	3–1	2–1	2–0	2–1		2–3	2–1	1–2	0–0	1–3	5–2	1–2
Shinnik Yaroslavl	2–0	6–0	1–1	2–1	4–2	0–0	1–1	1–0	1–3		2–1	2–2	2–1	2–0	1–0	1–1
Sokol Saratov	1–1	1–0	0–1	0–1	0–0	0–3	1–2	3–1	0–0	1–3		2–2	0–4	0–0	2–0	2–2
Spartak Moscow	2–1	2–1	0–3	1–0	3–1	1–2	0–0	2–0	0–2	3–0	2–1		0–1	2–1	0–2	4–3
Torpedo Moscow	2–0	3–0	2–3	2–0	4–3	2–2	0–1	3–1	1–1	2–0	1–0	1–2		2–1	2–2	1–1
Torpedo-ZIL Moscow	0–0	1–0	0–2	0–2	0–2	0–2	2–0	0–2	0–0	1–0	2–0	0–2	2–1		2–2	1–2
Uralan Elista	2–0	0–1	3–3	1–3	1–0	0–0	0–0	2–0	1–2	1–1	1–1	1–1	0–1	1–0		3–3
Zenit St. Petersburg	2–1	2–2	0–2	1–2	1–2	1–1	0–2	1–0	1–2	1–1	2–0	0–1	2–2	0–0	2–1	

Legend: Blue = home team win; Yellow = draw; Red = away team win.

== Season statistics ==
=== Top goalscorers ===
As of matches played on 21 November 2002.

Rank	Player	Club	Goal
1	(Russia) Rolan Gusev	CSKA	15
1	(Russia) Dmitri Kirichenko	CSKA	15
3	(Russia) Aleksandr Kerzhakov	Zenit	14
4	(Russia) Vladimir Beschastnykh	Spartak Moscow	12
4	(Russia) Andrei Karyaka	Krylia	12
6	(Lithuania) Robertas Poškus	Krylia	11
6	(Moldova) Serghei Rogaciov	Saturn	11
6	(Russia) Igor Semshov	Torpedo	11
9	(Russia) Aleksandr Shirko	Torpedo	10
9	(Russia) Zurab Tsiklauri	Uralan	10

== Awards ==
On December 10 Russian Football Union named its list of 33 top players:

Goalkeepers

1. (Russia) Sergei Ovchinnikov (Lokomotiv Moscow)
2. (Russia) Ruslan Nigmatullin (CSKA Moscow)
3. (Russia) Valeri Chizhov (Saturn)

Sweeper

1. (Russia) Sergei Ignashevich (Lokomotiv Moscow)
2. (Armenia) Sargis Hovsepyan (Zenit)
3. (Ukraine) Bohdan Shershun (CSKA Moscow)

Right backs

1. (Russia) Vadim Evseev (Lokomotiv Moscow)
2. (Ukraine) Dmytro Parfenov (Spartak Moscow)
3. (Russia) Dmitri Sennikov (Lokomotiv Moscow)

Stopper

1. (Russia) Gennadiy Nizhegorodov (Lokomotiv Moscow)
2. (Uzbekistan) Oleg Pashinin (Lokomotiv Moscow)
3. (Russia) Omari Tetradze (Alania)

Left backs

1. (South Africa) Jacob Lekgetho (Lokomotiv Moscow)
2. (Senegal) Ibra Kébé (Spartak Moscow)
3. (Russia) Denis Yevsikov (CSKA Moscow)

Defensive midfielders

1. (Bosnia and Herzegovina) Elvir Rahimić (CSKA Moscow)
2. (Russia) Yevgeni Aldonin (Rotor)
3. (Russia) Igor Semshov (Torpedo Moscow)

Right wingers

1. (Russia) Rolan Gusev (CSKA Moscow)
2. (Russia) Andrei Arshavin (Zenit)
3. (Federal Republic of Yugoslavia) Ognjen Koroman (Dynamo Moscow)

Central midfielders

1. (Russia) Dmitri Loskov (Lokomotiv Moscow)
2. (Uzbekistan) Vladimir Maminov (Lokomotiv Moscow)
3. (Russia) Yegor Titov (Spartak Moscow)

Left wingers

1. (Russia) Andrei Karyaka (Krylia Sovetov)
2. (Russia) Andrei Solomatin (CSKA Moscow)
3. (Russia) Igor Yanovsky (CSKA Moscow)

Right forwards

1. (Russia) Sergei Semak (CSKA Moscow)
2. (Nigeria) James Obiorah (Lokomotiv Moscow)
3. (Russia) Dmitri Kirichenko (CSKA Moscow)

Left forwards

1. (Russia) Aleksandr Kerzhakov (Zenit)
2. (Russia) Ruslan Pimenov (Lokomotiv Moscow)
3. (Russia) Denis Popov (CSKA Moscow)

== Medal squads ==
1. FC Lokomotiv Moscow

Goalkeepers: Sergei I. Ovchinnikov (31).
Defenders: Sergei Ignashevich (29 / 1), Gennadiy Nizhegorodov (29), Vadim Evseev (24 / 7), Dmitri Sennikov (24 / 1), Oleg Pashinin (Uzbekistan) (24), Jacob Lekgetho (South Africa) (23 / 2), Yuri Drozdov (18), Milan Obradović (Federal Republic of Yugoslavia) (17).
Midfielders: Dmitri Loskov (30 / 7), Vladimir Maminov (Uzbekistan) (29 / 4), Narvik Sirkhayev (Azerbaijan) (15 / 4), Marat Izmailov (14 / 2), Bennett Mnguni (South Africa) (4).
Forwards: James Obiorah (Nigeria) (23 / 5), Maksim Buznikin (23 / 2), Ruslan Pimenov (19 / 7), Júlio César (Brazil) (11 / 3), Nemanja Vučićević (Federal Republic of Yugoslavia) (9), Baba Adamu (Ghana) (8 / 1), Giorgi Demetradze (Georgia (country)) (6), Sergei V. Ovchinnikov (1).
(league appearances and goals listed in brackets)

One own goal scored by Dmytro Semochko (Ukraine) (FC Uralan Elista).

Manager: Yuri Syomin.

Transferred out during the season: Giorgi Demetradze (Georgia (country)) (to FC Alania Vladikavkaz).

2. PFC CSKA Moscow

Goalkeepers: Ruslan Nigmatullin (15), Veniamin Mandrykin (13), Dmitriy Kramarenko (Azerbaijan) (3).
Defenders: Denis Yevsikov (29), Deividas Šemberas (Lithuania) (28), Andrei Solomatin (26 / 3), Vyacheslav Dayev (22 / 1), Bohdan Shershun (Ukraine) (18 / 1), Aleksei Berezutski (16), Aleksandr Berketov (8), Yevgeni Varlamov (2), Vasili Berezutski (2).
Midfielders: Rolan Gusev (30 / 15), Elvir Rahimić (Bosnia and Herzegovina) (30 / 2), Igor Yanovsky (29 / 4), Juris Laizāns (Latvia) (27 / 3), Sergei Semak (24 / 6), Aleksei Triputen (9), Artur Tlisov (3).
Forwards: Denis Popov (28 / 7), Dmitri Kirichenko (26 / 15), Spartak Gogniyev (21 / 2), Roman Monaryov (Ukraine) (12), Igor Piyuk (1).

One own goal scored by Martin Hyský (Czech Republic) (FC Dynamo Moscow).

Manager: Valery Gazzaev.

Transferred out during the season: Igor Piyuk (to FC Torpedo-ZIL Moscow).

3. FC Spartak Moscow

Goalkeepers: Maksym Levytskyi (Ukraine) (19), Stanislav Cherchesov (7), Dmitri Goncharov (6).
Defenders: Igor Mitreski (North Macedonia) (27), Ibra Kébé (Senegal) (24 / 3), Moisés (Brazil) (23 / 1), Dmitri Ananko (21), Dmytro Parfenov (Ukraine) (16 / 2), Yuri Kovtun (16 / 1), Jerry-Christian Tchuissé (Cameroon) (12), Valeri Abramidze (Georgia (country)) (6), Dmitri Khlestov (6), Andrei Streltsov (4), Samuel Ogunsania (Nigeria) (1).
Midfielders: Vasili Baranov (Belarus) (24 / 1), Dmitri Kudryashov (22 / 5), Yegor Titov (20 / 4), Eduard Tsykhmeystruk (Ukraine) (20 / 2), Maksym Kalynychenko (Ukraine) (11 / 1), Artyom Bezrodny (6 / 1), Aleksandr Pavlenko (5), Dmitri Torbinski (3), Marcelo Silva (Brazil) (2), Pyotr Nemov (2), Aleksandr Sheshukov (2), Aleksei Rebko (1), Aleksandr Samedov (1), Robert Scarlett (Jamaica) (1).
Forwards: Vladimir Beschastnykh (30 / 12), Aleksandr Danishevsky (21 / 4), Dmitri Sychev (18 / 9), Okon Flo Essien (Nigeria) (9 / 1), Aleksandr Sonin (8 / 2), Pavel Pogrebnyak (2), Raman Vasilyuk (Belarus) (1).

Manager: Oleg Romantsev.

Transferred out during the season: Dmitri Ananko (to (France) AC Ajaccio), Eduard Tsykhmeystruk (Ukraine) (to (Ukraine) FC Metalurh Donetsk), Dmitri Sychev (to (France) Marseille), Dmitri Goncharov (to FC Alania Vladikavkaz), Raman Vasilyuk (Belarus) (to (Belarus) FC Dinamo Minsk).

== Attendances ==
No.	Club	Average	Change	Highest
1	Alania	22,933	12,8%	30,000
2	Krylia Sovetov	21,533	-10,0%	33,000
3	Zenit	17,767	-13,9%	22,000
4	Shinnik	15,633	1,0%	22,000
5	Rotor	13,027	3,8%	19,500
6	Spartak Moscow	12,233	5,6%	60,000
7	Anji	11,493	-15,3%	16,000
8	Sokol	11,000	-22,7%	15,000
9	Saturn	10,600	0,3%	16,000
10	Rostselmash	10,387	8,0%	15,500
11	PFC CSKA	9,700	10,2%	14,000
12	Elista	7,487	30,4%	11,000
13	Lokomotiv Moscow	7,133	58,8%	25,000
14	Dynamo Moscow	6,800	-1,9%	20,000
15	FC Moscow	4,800	-20,4%	6,500
16	Torpedo-ZIL	3,767	-1,6%	14,000

== See also ==
- 2002 in Russian football
