= Sonin =

Sonin may refer to:

== People ==
- Sonin (regent) (1601–1667), regent in China during the Qing dynasty
- Aleksandr Sonin (born 1983), Russian professional football player
- David Sonin (1935–2008), music critic and arts journalist
- Konstantin Sonin (born 1972), Russian economist
- Nikolay Yakovlevich Sonin (1849–1915), Russian mathematician
- Ray Sonin (1907–1991), English-born Canadian broadcaster
- Yevhen Sonin (born 1974), former Ukrainian football player
- Sonim (born 1983), (ソニン, sometimes transliterated as Sonin) (born 1983), Korean-Japanese singer

== Other ==
- Loprazolam, an anti-insomnia drug marketed under the name "Sonin"
- Sonin polynomials, a form of Laguerre polynomials
- "Sonin", a variant of the name Sonia
