= 2001 Russian First Division =

Russian First Division
- Season: 2001

The 2001 Russian First Division was the 10th edition of Russian First Division. There were 18 teams.

== Standings ==
Pos	Team	Pld	W	D	L	GF	GA	GD	Pts	Promotion or relegation
1	Shinnik Yaroslavl (P)	34	21	6	7	58	21	+37	69	Promotion to Premier League
2	Uralan Elista (P)	34	19	8	7	55	31	+24	65	Promotion to Premier League
3	Kuban Krasnodar	34	16	12	6	56	29	+27	60	
4	Amkar Perm	34	16	8	10	46	29	+17	56	
5	Spartak Nalchik	34	17	4	13	48	37	+11	55	
6	Volgar-Gazprom Astrakhan	34	14	8	12	40	40	0	50	
7	Tom Tomsk	34	12	11	11	31	28	+3	47	
8	Rubin Kazan	34	13	7	14	44	44	0	46	
9	Metallurg Krasnoyarsk	34	12	9	13	39	47	−8	45	
10	Kristall Smolensk	34	13	5	16	37	45	−8	44	
11	Netfekhimik Nizhnekamsk	34	13	4	17	49	56	−7	43	
12	Khimki	34	13	4	17	42	54	−12	43	
13	Gazovik-Gazprom Izhevsk	34	12	6	16	38	44	−6	42	
14	Lada-Togliatti	34	12	5	17	40	50	−10	41	
15	Lokomotiv Chita	34	12	4	18	38	50	−12	40	
16	Arsenal Tula (R)	34	10	10	14	27	35	−8	40	Relegation to Second Division
17	Baltika Kaliningrad (R)	34	11	6	17	35	51	−16	39	Relegation to Second Division
18	Lokomotiv Nizhny Novgorod (R)	34	9	5	20	26	58	−32	32	Relegation to Second Division

Source: PFL, RSSSF
(P) Promoted; (R) Relegated

== Results ==
Home \ Away	AMK	ARS	BAL	GGI	KHI	KRI	KUB	LAD	LCH	LNN	MKR	NEF	RUB	SHI	SPN	TOM	URE	VOL
Amkar Perm		1–0	1–0	3–0	4–0	1–1	2–1	2–1	1–0	4–0	4–0	1–1	2–1	1–0	1–1	2–0	3–1	2–0
Arsenal Tula	2–1		0–0	0–0	1–2	0–0	0–3	2–1	3–0	1–0	0–0	3–2	0–0	1–1	0–1	1–0	1–0	2–1
Baltika Kaliningrad	1–0	2–0		2–0	1–1	2–0	1–1	4–2	2–1	2–1	2–2	2–1	1–1	1–2	1–0	1–0	1–2	2–2
Gazovik-Gazprom	2–0	1–0	2–0		0–2	1–0	2–2	2–0	0–0	2–0	0–0	4–1	0–3	2–0	3–0	1–2	1–2	2–1
Khimki	1–0	1–2	2–0	1–1		3–2	2–1	3–2	4–2	2–1	3–0	2–4	2–0	0–2	3–1	1–1	1–3	1–0
Kristall Smolensk	0–0	1–0	1–0	1–2	2–1		2–0	1–0	3–2	3–0	3–1	2–1	1–2	1–2	2–1	1–1	0–3	1–0
Kuban Krasnodar	0–0	2–1	3–1	3–0	4–0	2–1		5–1	2–1	3–0	3–0	3–1	1–1	0–2	3–1	2–0	2–1	1–0
Lada-Togliatti	0–1	1–1	2–0	2–3	1–0	4–1	1–1		3–0	3–0	1–0	3–1	1–0	1–0	2–1	1–0	0–0	1–0
Lokomotiv Chita	2–1	0–1	5–0	2–1	1–0	1–0	1–3	1–1		1–0	1–0	4–2	3–1	2–1	2–1	1–1	3–0	0–1
Lokomotiv Nizhny Novgorod	0–0	1–0	0–2	1–0	1–0	0–1	1–1	2–1	1–0		3–2	1–2	3–4	0–6	4–2	1–0	1–4	0–2
Metallurg Krasnoyarsk	2–2	2–0	3–1	2–1	3–1	3–1	0–0	2–1	1–1	1–0		3–1	2–1	0–1	3–2	0–0	2–1	3–2
Netfekhimik Nizhnekamsk	0–0	2–1	2–0	3–1	1–0	1–2	1–1	2–0	3–1	2–3	2–1		3–1	0–0	2–1	2–1	2–4	4–1
Rubin Kazan	1–3	1–1	2–1	1–1	2–0	1–0	1–0	1–1	3–0	0–0	4–0	1–0		2–1	3–0	2–1	0–1	0–2
Shinnik Yaroslavl	2–0	2–1	4–0	2–1	4–1	1–0	1–1	5–1	4–0	3–0	1–1	1–0	1–0		1–0	3–0	1–1	2–0
Spartak Nalchik	1–0	1–0	2–0	1–0	1–0	3–0	0–0	2–0	1–0	3–1	2–0	3–0	3–0	1–0		2–0	2–1	5–0
Tom Tomsk	2–1	1–1	3–1	1–0	2–0	1–0	1–0	2–0	2–0	0–0	0–0	2–0	3–0	2–1	1–1		0–0	1–1
Uralan Elista	4–1	4–1	1–0	3–0	3–1	3–1	1–1	2–1	1–0	0–0	1–0	2–0	3–2	0–0	1–1	1–0		0–0
Volgar-Gazprom	2–1	0–0	2–1	3–2	1–1	2–2	1–1	3–0	2–0	1–0	1–0	1–0	3–2	0–1	3–1	0–0	2–1	

Source: PFL (in Russian)
Legend: Blue = home team win; Yellow = draw; Red = away team win.

== Top goalscorers ==
Rank	Player	Team	Goals
1	(Russia) Vitali Kakunin	Neftekhimik	20
2	(Russia) Oleg Teryokhin	Kuban	15
3	(Russia) Sergei Bulatov	Metallurg (K)	14
3	(Russia) Zurab Tsiklauri	Uralan	14
5	(Russia) Arsen Avakov	Uralan	13
5	(Russia) Nail Galimov	Lokomotiv (Ch)	13
7	(Russia) Maksim Autlev	Spartak (N)	12
7	(Georgia (country)) Teimuraz Gadelia	Kristall	12
9	(Russia) Konstantin Paramonov	Amkar	11
10	(Russia) Sergei Perednya	Tom	10

== Attendances ==
#	Club	Average
1	Volgar	25,088
2	Kuban	16,147
3	Shinnik	15,476
4	Tom	12,441
5	Amkar	9,488
6	Arsenal Tula	8,953
7	Yenisey	8,465
8	Baltika	8,295
9	Zenit Izhevsk	8,218
10	Kristall	7,971
11	Spartak Nalchik	7,959
12	Chita	6,665
13	Elista	5,741
14	Rubin	5,456
15	Khimki	3,500
16	Neftekhimik	3,412
17	Nizhny Novgorod	3,406
18	Lada	2,618

== See also ==
- 2001 Russian Top Division
