= Dmitri Khlestov =

Russian footballer

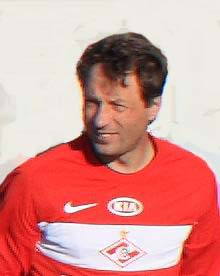

Personal information
- Full name: Dmitri Alekseyevich Khlestov
- Date of birth: 21 January 1971 (age 55)
- Place of birth: Moscow, Soviet Union
- Height: 1.77 m (5 ft 10 in)
- Position: Defender

Youth career
- SDYuShOR-2 Lyublino Moscow

Senior career*
Years	Team	Apps	(Gls)
1989–2000	Spartak Moscow	195	(6)
2000–2002	Beşiktaş	24	(1)
2002	Spartak Moscow	6	(0)
2003	Torpedo-Metallurg Moscow	17	(0)
2004–2005	Sokol Saratov	48	(0)
2006–2008	Spartak Shchyolkovo	65	(1)
2009–2010	Olimp-SKOPA Zheleznodorozhny		
2011–2012	Lyubertsy		
2012	Arsenal Tula (amateur)		
2012	Sparta Shchyolkovo		
2013	Losino-Petrovsky		
2014–2017	Odintsovo		

International career
1992	CIS	3	(0)
1992–2002	Russia	49	(0)
- * Club domestic league appearances and goals

Dmitri Alekseyevich Khlestov (Russian: Дмитрий Алексеевич Хлестов; born 21 January 1971) is a former Russian football player.

== Club career ==
He played for Spartak Moscow, Turkish club Beşiktaş, Torpedo-Metallurg Moscow and Sokol Saratov.

After 2008 he played in some amateur teams.

== International ==
He played for Russia national football team and was a participant at the 1994 FIFA World Cup. Khlestov is one of the two players (along with his former teammate Dmitri Ananko) who won the Russian League 9 times.

== Honours ==
- Russian Premier League winner in 1992, 1993, 1994, 1996, 1997, 1998, 1999, 2000
- Russian Cup winner in 1992, 1994, 1998, 2003

== Career statistics ==
Club	Season	League			Cup		Continental		Other		Total	
Club	Season	Division	Apps	Goals	Apps	Goals	Apps	Goals	Apps	Goals	Apps	Goals
Spartak Moscow	1989	Soviet Top League	0	0	0	0	0	0	5 (Note: Appearances in the USSR Federation Cup)	0	5	0
Spartak Moscow	1990	Soviet Top League	4	0	0	0	0	0	–		4	0
Spartak Moscow	1991	Soviet Top League	14	0	4	0	4 (Note: Appearances in the UEFA Cup)	0	–		22	0
Spartak Moscow	1992	Russian Premier League	24	0	2	0	4 (Note: Appearances in the UEFA Cup Winners' Cup)	0	–		30	0
Spartak Moscow	1993	Russian Premier League	19	1	1	0	10 (Note: Four appearances in the UEFA Cup Winners' Cup, six appearances, one goal in the UEFA Champions League)	1	–		30	2
Spartak Moscow	1994	Russian Premier League	17	0	5	0	7 (Note: Appearances in the UEFA Champions League)	0	–		29	0
Spartak Moscow	1995	Russian Premier League	26	1	2	0	6	0	–		34	1
Spartak Moscow	1996	Russian Premier League	0	0	0	0	0	0	–		0	0
Spartak Moscow	1997	Russian Premier League	27	1	2	0	4 (Note: Two appearances in the UEFA Champions League, two appearances in the UEFA Cup)	0	–		33	1
Spartak Moscow	1998	Russian Premier League	23	1	4	0	10 (Note: Four appearances in the UEFA Cup, six appearances, one goal in the UEFA Champions League)	1	–		37	2
Spartak Moscow	1999	Russian Premier League	27	1	1	0	10 (Note: Eight appearances in the UEFA Champions League, two appearances in the UEFA Cup)	0	–		38	1
Spartak Moscow	2000	Russian Premier League	14	1	3	0	–		–		17	1
Spartak Moscow	Total		195	6	24	0	55	2	5	0	279	8
Spartak-d Moscow	1992	Russian Second League	5	1	1	0	–		–		6	1
Spartak-d Moscow	1993	Russian Second League	3	0	–		–		–		3	0
Spartak-d Moscow	Total		8	1	1	0	0	0	0	0	9	1
Beşiktaş	2000–01	Süper Lig	7	0	1	0	8	0	–		16	0
Beşiktaş	2001–02	Süper Lig	17	1	2	0	–		–		19	1
Beşiktaş	Total		24	1	3	0	8	0	0	0	35	1
Spartak Moscow	2002	Russian Premier League	6	0	1	0	5	0	–		12	0
Torpedo-Metallurg Moscow	2003	Russian Premier League	17	0	2	0	–		2 (Note: Appearances in the Russian Premier League Cup)	0	21	0
Sokol Saratov	2004	Russian First League	39	0	2	0	–		–		41	0
Sokol Saratov	2005	Russian First League	9	0	0	0	–		–		9	0
Sokol Saratov	Total		48	0	2	0	0	0	0	0	50	0
Spartak Shchyolkovo	2006	Russian Second League	17	0	0	0	–		–		17	0
Spartak Shchyolkovo	2007	Russian Second League	24	0	0	0	–		–		24	0
Spartak Shchyolkovo	2008	Russian Second League	24	1	2	0	–		–		26	1
Spartak Shchyolkovo	Total		65	1	2	0	0	0	0	0	67	1
Career total			363	9	35	0	68	2	7	0	473	11
