= Predrag Ristović =

Serbian footballer

Personal information
- Full name: Predrag Ristović
- Date of birth: 21 September 1975 (age 51)
- Place of birth: Zemun, SFR Yugoslavia
- Height: 1.85 m (6 ft 1 in)
- Position: Goalkeeper

Senior career*
Years	Team	Apps	(Gls)
1996–1997	Loznica	26	(0)
1997–2001	Zemun	122	(0)
2001–2002	Spartak Moscow	0	(0)
2003	Rad	4	(0)
2003–2005	Obilić	62	(0)
2005–2009	Royal Antwerp	125	(0)
2009–2010	URS Centre		
2010–2011	RFC Liège	21	(0)
2011–2015	Cappellen	11	(0)
2015–2018	Sint-Job		
2018	Herenthout		
Total		371	(0)

International career
2001	FR Yugoslavia	1	(0)
- * Club domestic league appearances and goals

Predrag Ristović (Serbian Cyrillic: Предраг Ристовић; born 21 September 1975) is a Serbian retired footballer who played as a goalkeeper.

== Club career ==
Ristović is best remembered for his stints at Zemun and Royal Antwerp, spending four seasons with each side.

== International career ==
Ristović was capped once by FR Yugoslavia in July 2001, appearing as a late second-half substitute for Saša Stevanović in a 0–1 loss to Japan at the Kirin Cup.
