= David Sonin =

British music journalist (1935–2008)

David Sonin (14 November 1935 – 13 May 2008) was a British music critic and arts journalist.

He was born in Whitechapel, East London, in 1935, but his father Isidore moved his family to Australia shortly before the outbreak of the Second World War. He was educated at a Jesuit primary and Sydney Grammar School, then read mathematics and physics at the University of Sydney. He began a journalistic career at the Australian Broadcasting Corporation.

Sonin returned to London in 1963, where he met and married the pianist Gillian Sack. Sonin worked for brief periods at Visnews and ITN, then became publicity director for the Jewish National Fund and the Joint Israel Appeal. He returned to print journalism in 1978, writing for The Jewish Chronicle, and was eventually appointed as arts editor. Until his retirement in June 2000, Sonin particularly concentrated on classical music and performance. Sonin was passionate about the place of music in the local community and supported the Hampstead and Highgate Music Festival, and the Highgate Choral Society. He also worked for the Jewish Music Institute (now part of the School of Oriental and African Studies at the University of London).

His final work was as the music critic for the Hampstead & Highgate Express. Sonin died of cancer in May 2008, aged 72.

On 28 February 2009, a memorial concert was given in David's honour at University College School, Hampstead. Performers included Jennifer Bate and Cecilia McDowall.
