= Dmytro Parfyonov =

Ukrainian football manager (born 1974)

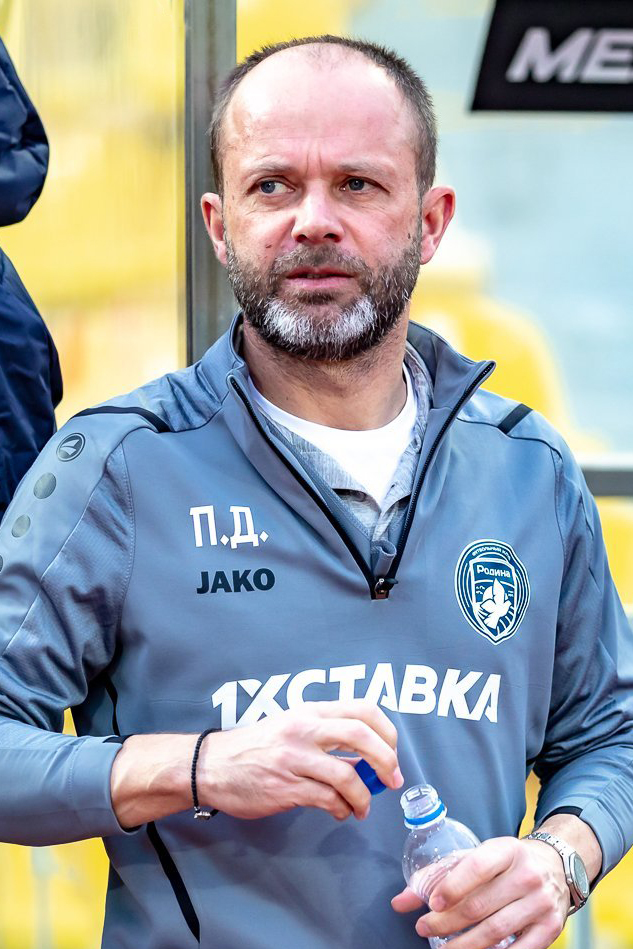
- Parfyonov as a coach of Rodina Moscow in 2022

Personal information
- Full name: Dmytro Volodymyrovych Parfyonov
- Date of birth: 11 September 1974 (age 52)
- Place of birth: Odesa, Ukrainian SSR, Soviet Union
- Height: 1.70 m (5 ft 7 in)
- Position: Left back

Team information
- Current team: Rotor Volgograd (manager)

Youth career
- 1985–1988: DYuSSh-6 Odesa
- 1988–1990: Chornomorets Odesa

Senior career*
| Years | Team | Apps | (Gls) |
| 1991–1997 | Chornomorets Odesa | 164 | (10) |
| 1997–1998 | Dnipro Dnipropetrovsk | 13 | (3) |
| 1997 | → Dnipro-2 Dnipropetrovsk | 1 | (0) |
| 1998–2005 | Spartak Moscow | 125 | (15) |
| 2006 | Dynamo Moscow | 6 | (0) |
| 2006–2007 | Khimki | 15 | (0) |
| 2007–2008 | Arsenal Kyiv | 8 | (0) |
| 2009–2010 | Saturn Ramenskoye | 17 | (0) |
| 2011–2012 | Arsenal Tula (amateur) | | |

International career
| 1991 | USSR U-16 | | |
| 1992–1995 | Ukraine U-21 | 21 | (1) |
| 1995–2004 | Ukraine | 18 | (0) |

Managerial career
- 2012–2015: Tekstilshchik Ivanovo
- 2015–2018: Tosno
- 2018–2020: Ural Yekaterinburg
- 2020–2021: Arsenal Tula
- 2022–2023: Rodina Moscow
- 2023–2024: Aktobe
- 2025: Torpedo Moscow
- 2025–: Rotor Volgograd
- * Club domestic league appearances and goals

Dmytro Volodymyrovych Parfyonov (Ukrainian: Дмитро Володимирович Парфьонов; born 11 September 1974) is a Ukrainian football manager and a former defender who is the manager of Russian First League club Rotor Volgograd.

== Playing career ==
Parfyonov is best known as a player of Chornomorets Odesa and Spartak Moscow. He spent seven years playing for Spartak Moscow in the Russian Premier League, earning several champion's titles.

== Coaching career ==
On 21 May 2018, following FC Tosno's relegation from the Russian Premier League, he signed as a manager for FC Ural Yekaterinburg. He resigned from Ural on 19 July 2020 following a defeat in the 2019–20 Russian Cup semifinal to FC Khimki.

On 2 November 2020, he was hired by FC Arsenal Tula. He left Arsenal by mutual consent on 3 September 2021, with the club in the relegation spot.

On 11 June 2022, Parfyonov signed with Rodina Moscow, newly promoted into the second-tier Russian Football National League. He left Rodina by mutual consent on 10 October 2023.

On 1 December 2023, Parfyonov was hired by Aktobe in Kazakhstan.

== Honours ==
- Russian Premier League champion: 1998, 1999, 2000, 2001.
- Russian Premier League runner-up: 2005.
- Russian Premier League bronze: 2002.
- Russian Cup winner: 1998.
- Ukrainian Premier League runner-up: 1995, 1996.
- Ukrainian Premier League bronze: 1993, 1994.
- Ukrainian Cup winner: 1992, 1994.

== Career statistics ==
=== Playing career ===
| Club | Season | League | | | Cup | | Continental | | Other | | Total | |
| Club | Season | Division | Apps | Goals | Apps | Goals | Apps | Goals | Apps | Goals | Apps | Goals |
|---|---|---|---|---|---|---|---|---|---|---|---|---|
| Chornomorets Odesa | 1991 | Soviet Top League | 0 | 0 | 3 | 0 | – | | – | | 3 | 0 |
| Chornomorets Odesa | 1992 | Ukrainian Premier League | 12 | 0 | 6 | 0 | – | | – | | 18 | 0 |
| Chornomorets Odesa | 1992–93 | Ukrainian Premier League | 28 | 0 | 2 | 0 | 4 (Note: Appearances in the UEFA Cup Winners' Cup) | 0 | – | | 34 | 0 |
| Chornomorets Odesa | 1993–94 | Ukrainian Premier League | 32 | 3 | 9 | 2 | – | | – | | 41 | 5 |
| Chornomorets Odesa | 1994–95 | Ukrainian Premier League | 33 | 6 | 7 | 0 | 2 | 0 | – | | 42 | 6 |
| Chornomorets Odesa | 1995–96 | Ukrainian Premier League | 34 | 0 | 1 | 0 | 6 (Note: Appearances in the UEFA Cup) | 0 | – | | 41 | 0 |
| Chornomorets Odesa | 1996–97 | Ukrainian Premier League | 25 | 1 | 2 | 0 | 2 | 0 | – | | 29 | 1 |
| Chornomorets Odesa | Total | | 164 | 10 | 30 | 2 | 14 | 0 | 0 | 0 | 208 | 12 |
| Dnipro Dnipropetrovsk | 1997–98 | Ukrainian Premier League | 13 | 3 | 0 | 0 | 4 | 0 | – | | 17 | 3 |
| Dnipro-2 Dnipropetrovsk | 1997–98 | Ukrainian Second League | 1 | 0 | – | | – | | – | | 1 | 0 |
| Spartak Moscow | 1998 | Russian Premier League | 29 | 1 | 4 | 0 | 7 (Note: Appearances in the UEFA Champions League) | 0 | – | | 40 | 1 |
| Spartak Moscow | 1999 | Russian Premier League | 17 | 0 | 1 | 0 | 10 (Note: Eight appearances in the UEFA Champions League, two appearances in the UEFA Cup) | 0 | – | | 28 | 0 |
| Spartak Moscow | 2000 | Russian Premier League | 25 | 4 | 5 | 0 | 7 | 0 | – | | 37 | 4 |
| Spartak Moscow | 2001 | Russian Premier League | 26 | 4 | 2 | 0 | 9 | 1 | – | | 37 | 5 |
| Spartak Moscow | 2002 | Russian Premier League | 16 | 2 | 0 | 0 | 0 | 0 | – | | 16 | 2 |
| Spartak Moscow | 2003 | Russian Premier League | 1 | 0 | 2 | 0 | 2 | 1 | 0 | 0 | 5 | 1 |
| Spartak Moscow | 2004 | Russian Premier League | 9 | 4 | 0 | 0 | 2 | 0 | 1 (Note: Appearances in the Russian Super Cup) | 0 | 12 | 4 |
| Spartak Moscow | 2005 | Russian Premier League | 2 | 0 | 0 | 0 | – | | – | | 2 | 0 |
| Spartak Moscow | Total | | 125 | 15 | 14 | 0 | 37 | 2 | 1 | 0 | 177 | 17 |
| Dynamo Moscow | 2006 | Russian Premier League | 6 | 0 | 1 | 0 | – | | – | | 7 | 0 |
| Khimki | 2006 | Russian First League | 6 | 0 | 0 | 0 | – | | – | | 6 | 0 |
| Khimki | 2007 | Russian Premier League | 9 | 0 | 0 | 0 | – | | – | | 9 | 0 |
| Khimki | Total | | 15 | 0 | 0 | 0 | 0 | 0 | 0 | 0 | 15 | 0 |
| Arsenal Kyiv | 2007–08 | Ukrainian Premier League | 8 | 0 | 2 | 0 | – | | – | | 10 | 0 |
| Saturn Ramenskoye | 2009 | Russian Premier League | 4 | 0 | – | | – | | – | | 4 | 0 |
| Saturn Ramenskoye | 2010 | Russian Premier League | 13 | 0 | 0 | 0 | – | | – | | 13 | 0 |
| Saturn Ramenskoye | Total | | 17 | 0 | 0 | 0 | 0 | 0 | 0 | 0 | 17 | 0 |
| Career total | | | 349 | 28 | 47 | 2 | 55 | 2 | 1 | 0 | 452 | 32 |

=== Managerial statistics ===
As of match played 11 January 2024

Managerial record by team and tenure
| Team | Nat | From | To | Record | | | | | | | |
| Team | Nat | From | To | G | W | D | L | GF | GA | GD | Win % |
|---|---|---|---|---|---|---|---|---|---|---|---|
| Tekstilshchik Ivanovo | (Russia) | 1 July 2012 | 6 August 2015 | 100 | 56 | 23 | 21 | 166 | 98 | +68 | 56.00 |
| Tosno | (Russia) | 12 August 2015 | 20 May 2018 | 112 | 52 | 21 | 39 | 163 | 150 | +13 | 46.43 |
| Ural Yekaterinburg | (Russia) | 21 May 2018 | 19 July 2020 | 70 | 26 | 18 | 26 | 91 | 112 | −21 | 37.14 |
| Arsenal Tula | (Russia) | 2 November 2020 | 2 September 2021 | 25 | 5 | 3 | 17 | 22 | 42 | −20 | 20.00 |
| Rodina Moscow | (Russia) | 11 June 2022 | 10 October 2023 | 52 | 20 | 16 | 16 | 75 | 67 | +8 | 38.46 |
| Aktobe | (Kazakhstan) | 1 December 2023 | Present | 0 | 0 | 0 | 0 | 0 | 0 | +0 | — |
| Total | | | | 359 | 159 | 81 | 119 | 517 | 469 | +48 | 44.29 |
