= Anatoli Aslamov =

Russian footballer and coach

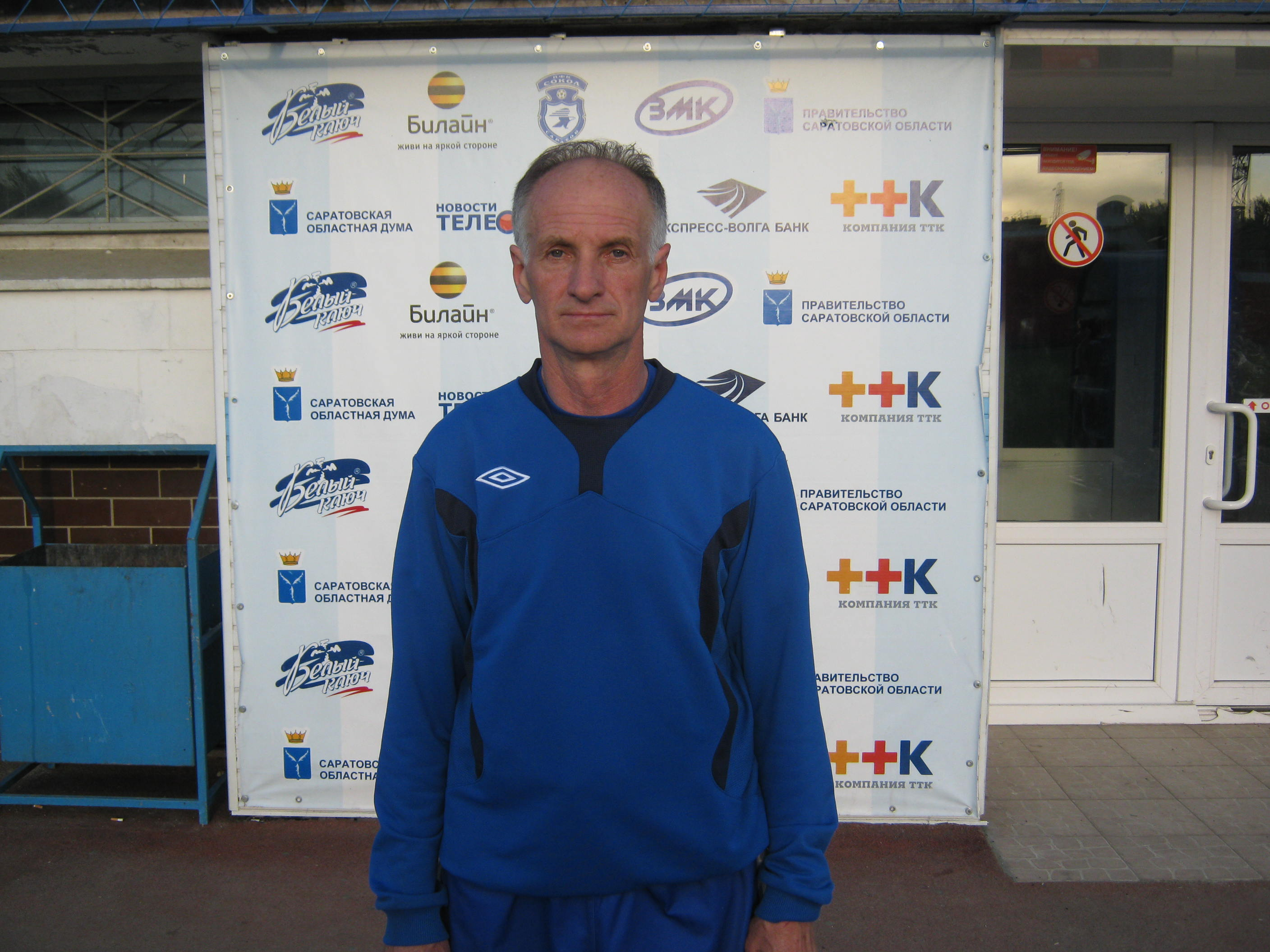

Personal information
- Full name: Anatoli Petrovich Aslamov
- Date of birth: 1 June 1953 (age 73)
- Height: 1.71 m (5 ft 7 1/2 in)
- Position: Midfielder

Senior career*
Years	Team	Apps	(Gls)
1970–1975	FC Sokol Saratov	168	(25)
1976	FC Iskra Smolensk	40	(6)
1977–1990	FC Sokol Saratov	468	(91)

Managerial career
- 1990–2005: FC Sokol Saratov (assistant)
- 1998: FC Sokol Saratov (caretaker)
- 2002: FC Sokol Saratov (caretaker)
- 2006: FC Salyut-Energiya Belgorod (assistant)
- 2007: FC Sokol Saratov (director)
- 2007–2008: FC Sokol Saratov
- 2008–2011: FC Sokol Saratov (assistant)
- 2012: FC Sokol Saratov (assistant)
- * Club domestic league appearances and goals

Anatoli Petrovich Aslamov (Russian: Анатолий Петрович Асламов; born 1 June 1953) is a Russian professional association football coach and a former player.

He played primarily for the FC Sokol Saratov club. He holds the record for the most matches played and goals scored for the club in the second league of the USSR championship for a period of 20 years. Aslamov played a total of 636 matches and scored 116 goals during his time with Saratov Sokol.

In addition to his club record, Aslamov holds the tournament record for most matches played in the second league, with a total of 676 appearances.
