= Robert Scarlett (footballer) =

Jamaican footballer (born 1979)

Personal information
- Full name: Robert Anthony Scarlett
- Date of birth: 14 January 1979 (age 47)
- Place of birth: Kingston, Jamaica
- Height: 5 ft 7 in (1.70 m)
- Positions: Defender; midfielder

Youth career
- 1991–1997: Harbour View

Senior career*
Years	Team	Apps	(Gls)
1998–2002	Harbour View	20+	(2+)
2002	Spartak Moscow	1	(0)
2003–2004	Harbour View	10	(2)
2004	W Connection	5	(2)
2005	Harbour View	0	(0)
2005	Real Salt Lake	9	(0)
2006–2009	Harbour View	34	(7)
2012–2013	Boys' Town	4	(0)

International career
1999–2005	Jamaica	40	(3)
- * Club domestic league appearances and goals

Robert Scarlett (born 14 January 1979) is a Jamaican former professional footballer who played as a defender or midfielder.

== Club career ==
Scarlett was born in Kingston. A small, but speedy, left-sided attacking defender, he played for Harbour View in his native Jamaica before signing for Russian Premier League side Spartak Moscow on a six-month contract, with the option of a three-year extension, in August 2002. After returning to Harbour View following his six-months with Spartak Moscow, Scarlett joined Major League Soccer side Real Salt Lake in July 2005. For Spartak, he only played one league game as a second-half substitute against Saturn Ramenskoe; he also made Spartak's UEFA Champions League roster but did not feature in any of their games.

== International career ==
Scarlett appeared for the Jamaica national team, making his debut in 1999 against Costa Rica and playing his last international in 2005 against Australia.

== Career statistics ==
=== Club ===
Appearances and goals by club, season and competition
Club	Season	League			National cup		Continental		Other		Total	
Club	Season	Division	Apps	Goals	Apps	Goals	Apps	Goals	Apps	Goals	Apps	Goals
Spartak Moscow	2002	Russian Premier League	1	0	0	0	0	0	–		1	0
Real Salt Lake	2005	Major League Soccer	9	0	0	0	–		–		9	0
Career total			10	0	0	0	0	0	-	-	10	0

=== International ===
Scores and results list Jamaica's goal tally first, score column indicates score after each Scarlett goal.

List of international goals scored by Robert Scarlett
No.	Date	Venue	Opponent	Score	Result	Competition
1	24 November 2004	Independence Park, Kingston, Jamaica	Saint Martin	6–0	12–0	2005 Caribbean Cup qualification
2	24 November 2004	Independence Park, Kingston, Jamaica	Saint Martin	12–0	12–0	2005 Caribbean Cup qualification
3	8 January 2005	Independence Park, Kingston, Jamaica	French Guiana	4–0	5–0	2005 Caribbean Cup qualification

== Honours ==
Harbour View

- National Premier League: 2000, 2007
- JFF Champions Cup: 2001, 2002
