= Moisés Moura =

Brazilian footballer

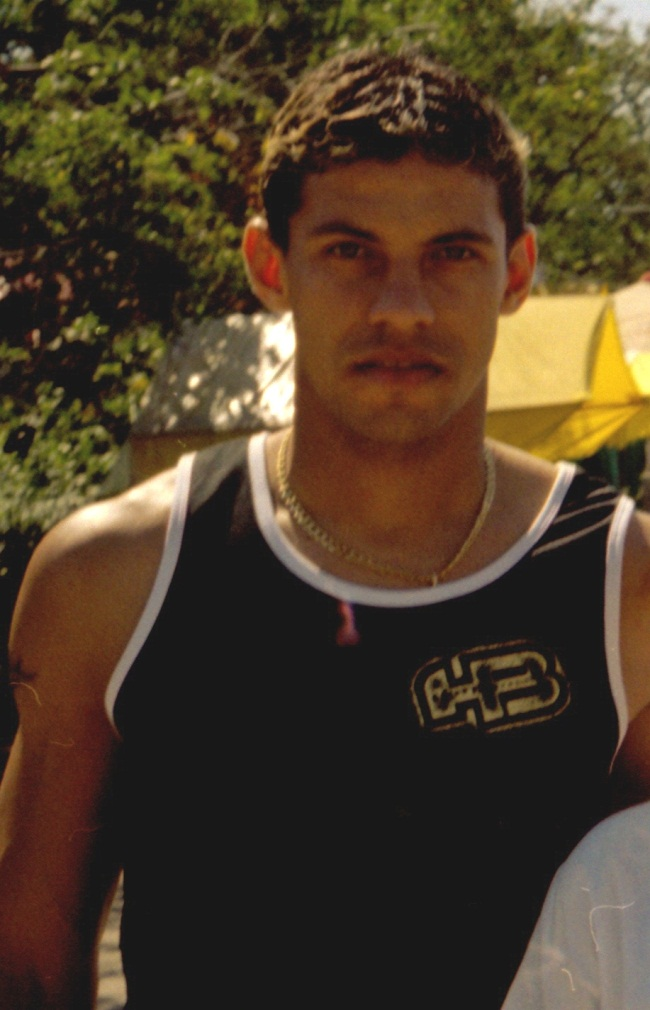

Personal information
- Full name: Moisés Moura Pinheiro
- Date of birth: 25 July 1979 (age 47)
- Place of birth: Nanuque, Brazil
- Height: 1.86 m (6 ft 1 in)
- Position: Centre back

Team information
- Current team: Coritiba U20 Manager

Senior career*
Years	Team	Apps	(Gls)
1998–2001	Vitória	46	(1)
2002	Paraná		
2002–2003	Spartak Moscow	43	(2)
2004–2005	Krylia Sovetov	22	(1)
2005–2006	Cruzeiro	23	(1)
2007–2008	Flamengo	4	(0)
2007–2008	→ Boavista (loan)	15	(0)
2008–2011	Braga	54	(2)
2011–2012	Al Rayyan	24	(0)
2012	Shanghai Shenhua	17	(2)
2013	Portuguesa	22	(2)
Total		270	(11)

Managerial career
- 2020–2022: Sporting Braga (youth)
- 2023: Guarani U20
- 2023: Guarani (interim)
- 2024: Cruzeiro (assistant)
- 2024: Cruzeiro (interim)
- 2024–: Coritiba U20
- * Club domestic league appearances and goals

Moisés Moura Pinheiro (born 25 July 1979) is a Brazilian football coach of Coritiba U20 team and former player who played as a central defender.

== Playing career ==
Born in Nanuque, Minas Gerais, Moura started his career with Esporte Clube Vitória, gradually becoming a regular for the Série A team and helping it win two consecutive Campeonato Baiano titles. In 2002, he competed with fellow league side Paraná Clube who finished 22nd out of 26 teams, narrowly avoiding relegation.

Moura moved to Russia still in 2002, joining Premier League club FC Spartak Moscow and winning the Russian Cup after defeating FC Rostov 1–0 in the final, with the player playing the full 90 minutes. The following season, as they underperformed in the domestic championship, he was allowed to leave the capital, signing for another side in the country and category, FC Krylia Sovetov Samara, for US$1.9 million.

Initially, things started well for Moura and his new team, who finished a best-ever third in the league and lost the domestic cup final, against FC Terek Grozny. After not being paid for five months, however, he returned to his country and joined Cruzeiro Esporte Clube, where he won the Minas Gerais League and attracted interest from Sporting Clube de Portugal, especially since his contract was about to end; the move was, however, terminated by Lisbon club after a ruling by FIFA concluded that he had been persuaded by Cruzeiro to terminate his contract with Krylia, and he was subsequently banned for four mouths, with the Brazilians not being able to acquire any players for two transfer windows.

After his ban was lifted, Moura would however play parts of the following four seasons in Portugal (two full), notably with S.C. Braga. In 2009–10 he only missed two league games as the Minho club finished in a best-ever second place, adding nine UEFA Champions League appearances in the following campaign (qualifying rounds included); he also played in his country with Clube de Regatas do Flamengo, who loaned him to Boavista F.C. while selling 50% of his economic rights to Cruzeiro.

On 16 January 2011, Moura joined Qatar Stars League side Al Rayyan SC, who paid €1.5 million for his services, split between Braga and Cruzeiro. On 27 December of the following year he returned to his homeland, signing with Associação Portuguesa de Desportos.

== Coaching career ==
After retiring, Moura returned to his former side Braga in 2020, as manager of the under-19 team. On 25 October 2022, he was named head coach of the under-20 category of Guarani.

On 22 February 2023, Moura was confirmed as interim head coach of Bugre, replacing sacked Mozart.

== Honours ==
Vitória

- Campeonato Baiano: 1999, 2000
- Campeonato do Nordeste: 1999

Spartak Moscow

- Russian Cup: 2002–03

Krylia

- Russian Cup: Runner-up 2003–04

Cruzeiro

- Campeonato Mineiro: 2006

Flamengo

- Campeonato Carioca: 2007
- Taça Guanabara: 2007

Braga

- UEFA Europa League: Runner-up 2010–11

Al Rayyan

- Emir of Qatar Cup: 2011

Portuguesa

- Campeonato Paulista Série A2: 2013
