= Boris Rappoport =

Russian footballer and coach

Personal information
- Full name: Boris Savelyevich Rappoport
- Date of birth: 1 May 1946 (age 80)
- Place of birth: Leningrad (now St. Petersburg), Russian SFSR
- Height: 1.78 m (5 ft 10 in)
- Position: Goalkeeper

Team information
- Current team: FC Leningradets Leningrad Oblast (asst coach)

Senior career*
Years	Team	Apps	(Gls)
1967–1968	FC Dynamo Leningrad		
1969	FC Traktor Volgograd	22	(0)
1971	FC Stroitel Ashkhabad	4	(0)

Managerial career
- 1994: FC Zenit St. Petersburg (assistant)
- 1998–1999: FC Dynamo St. Petersburg
- 2000: FC Severstal Cherepovets
- 2001: FC Lokomotiv-Zenit-2 St. Petersburg
- 2002–2004: FC Zenit St. Petersburg (director of sports)
- 2002: FC Zenit St. Petersburg
- 2003: FC Zenit-2 St. Petersburg (VP)
- 2004: FC Zenit-2 St. Petersburg (director of sports)
- 2006: FC Zenit-2 St. Petersburg (VP)
- 2006: FC Saturn Ramenskoye (deputy general director)
- 2007: FC Saturn Ramenskoye (director of sports)
- 2009: FC Zhemchuzhina-Sochi (VP)
- 2018–: FC Leningradets Leningrad Oblast (assistant)
- * Club domestic league appearances and goals

Boris Savelyevich Rappoport (Russian: Борис Савельевич Раппопорт; born 1 May 1946) is a Russian professional football coach and a former player. He is the assistant coach with FC Leningradets Leningrad Oblast.
