= Marco Villaseca =

Chilean footballer (born 1975)

Personal information
- Full name: Marco Antonio Villaseca Cabezas
- Date of birth: 15 March 1975 (age 51)
- Place of birth: Santiago, Chile
- Height: 1.86 m (6 ft 1 in)
- Position: Midfielder

Senior career*
Years	Team	Apps	(Gls)
1995–1996	Audax Italiano	29	(2)
1997–2003	Colo-Colo	113	(3)
2002	→ Unión Española (loan)	12	(2)
2002	→ Spartak Moscow (loan)	0	(0)
2004	Rostov	6	(1)
2005	Deportes Concepción	13	(0)
2006	Santiago Morning	10	(0)
2007	Deportes Concepción	0	(0)
2008–2009	Rangers	54	(4)
2010	O'Higgins	19	(0)
2011–2013	Rangers	55	(3)
Total		311	(15)

International career
1999–2001	Chile	20	(0)
2001	Chile B	1	(0)
- * Club domestic league appearances and goals

Marco Antonio Villaseca Cabezas (born March 15, 1975) is a Chilean former footballer who played as a defensive midfielder. Throughout his career, he had a reputation as a 'violent' player.

== International career ==
Villaseca played for Chile at the 2001 Copa América where the team reached the quarter-finals. In total, he made 20 appearances for the national team. In addition, he made an appearance for Chile B in the friendly match against Catalonia on 28 December 2001.

== Post-retirement ==
Villaseca has played for "Colo-Colo de Todos los Tiempos" (Colo-Colo from All Time), a team made up by historical players for Colo-Colo.

Villaseca worked as a dog groomer in the context of COVID-19 pandemic and switched to sale of shock absorbers.

== Honours ==
Colo-Colo

- Primera División de Chile (2): 1997 Clausura, 1998
