= Yuri Shishlov =

Russian footballer (1945–2010)

Personal information
- Full name: Yuri Nikolayevich Shishlov
- Date of birth: 23 January 1945
- Date of death: 5 August 2010 (aged 65)
- Position: Defender

Senior career*
Years	Team	Apps	(Gls)
1961–1963	FC Traktor Volgograd	?	(?)
1964–1966	FC SKA Rostov-on-Don	?	(?)
1967–1971	FC Stal Volgograd	87	(1)
1971–1976	FC Uralan Elista	?	(?)

Managerial career
- 1989–1991: FC Tekstilshchik Kamyshin (assistant)
- 1991–1995: FC Tekstilshchik Kamyshin (head of team)
- 1996–1998: FC Metallurg Lipetsk (president)
- 1998: FC Metallurg Lipetsk (caretaker)
- 1999: FC Metallurg Lipetsk (general director)
- 2000: FC Saturn Ramenskoye (vice-president)
- 2001–2002: FC Uralan Elista (general director)
- 2002: FC Uralan Elista (caretaker)
- 2003: FC Uralan Elista (technical director)
- 2004: FC Uralan Elista (sportive director)
- 2005: FC Lada Tolyatti (sportive director)
- 2005: FC Oryol (general director)
- 2005: FC Luch-Energia Vladivostok (scout)
- 2006: FC Luch-Energia Vladivostok (assistant)
- 2007: FC Shinnik Yaroslavl (deputy general director)
- 2008: FC Alania Vladikavkaz (sportive director)
- * Club domestic league appearances and goals

Yuri Nikolayevich Shishlov (Russian: Юрий Николаевич Шишлов; 23 January 1945 – 5 August 2010) was a Russian professional football coach and player.

Shishlov was shot in Moscow on 4 August 2010 and he died in hospital on 5 August. Police believe that Shishlov's murder was a contract killing related to a court case in which he testified against his former boss Vladimir Shepel at FC Shinnik Yaroslavl.
