= Igor Mitreski =

Macedonian footballer (born 1979)

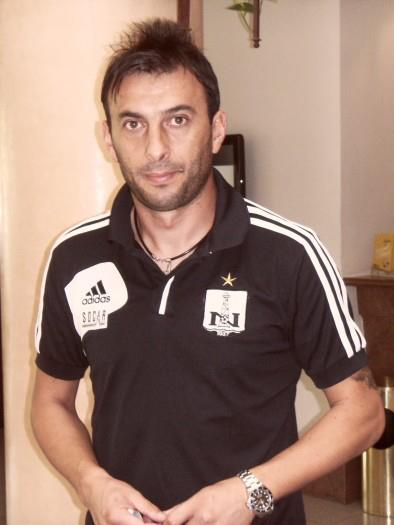
- Mitreski in 2012

Personal information
- Date of birth: 19 February 1979 (age 47)
- Place of birth: Struga, SFR Yugoslavia
- Height: 1.80 m (5 ft 11 in)
- Position: Defender

Youth career
- 1995: FK Makedonija
- 1995–1998: Karaorman
- 1998–1999: Napredok

Senior career*
Years	Team	Apps	(Gls)
1999–2001	Sileks	34	(0)
2001–2004	Spartak Moscow	85	(0)
2005	Metalurh Zaporizhzhia	12	(0)
2006	Beitar Jerusalem	10	(1)
2006–2007	→ Energie Cottbus (loan)	27	(0)
2007–2010	Energie Cottbus	49	(0)
2009	→ Beerschot (loan)	16	(0)
2010	CSKA Sofia	4	(0)
2010–2014	Neftchi Baku	101	(1)
Total		338	(2)

International career
2001–2011	Macedonia	70	(1)
- * Club domestic league appearances and goals

Igor Mitreski (Macedonian: Игор Митрески; born 19 February 1979) is a Macedonian former professional footballer who played as a defender.

== Career ==
Mitreski was born in Struga. In early 2005, he was recognized as a featured member of Bayern Munich and later was near to signing for Portsmouth.

He joined Energie Cottbus on loan from Beitar Jerusalem in summer 2006, following Cottbus' promotion to the Bundesliga, and signed for the club permanently in May 2007 on a three-year contract.

On 6 November he was suspended from the first team from Energie Cottbus. On 9 January 2009, he was loaned out to the Belgian team Germinal Beerschot.

One year later, in January 2010, Bulgarian CSKA Sofia signed Mitreski to a two-year deal for a €300,000.

Mitreski and CSKA Sofia mutually agreed to terminate Mitreski's contract as he was no longer in their plans and Mitreski no longer had the desire to play for CSKA Sofia.

Mitreski signed a two-year deal with Neftchi Baku from Azerbaijan on 9 July 2010.

== International career ==
Mitreski made his debut for the Macedonian national team in 2001 in a friendly game against the Czech Republic, and has earned 70 caps in which he scored one goal. His final international was an October 2011 European Championship qualification match against Armenia.

== Career statistics ==
=== Club ===
Appearances and goals by club, season and competition
Club	Season	League			National cup (Note: Includes Macedonian Cup, Russian Cup, Ukrainian Cup, Israel State Cup, DFB-Pokal, Belgian Cup, Bulgarian Cup, Azerbaijan Cup)		League cup (Note: Includes Super Cup, Toto Cup)		Continental		Total	
Club	Season	Division	Apps	Goals	Apps	Goals	Apps	Goals	Apps	Goals	Apps	Goals
Sileks	1999–2000	1. MFL	23	0	0	0	—		2	0	25	0
Sileks	2000–01	1. MFL	11	0	0	0	—		—		11	0
Sileks	Total		34	0	0	0	—		2	0	36	0
Spartak Moscow	2001	Russian Premier League	27	0	1	0	—		10	0	38	0
Spartak Moscow	2002	Russian Premier League	27	0	1	0	—		6	0	34	0
Spartak Moscow	2003	Russian Premier League	16	0	3	0	—		4	0	23	0
Spartak Moscow	2004	Russian Premier League	15	0	1	0	1	0	6	0	23	0
Spartak Moscow	Total		85	0	6	0	1	0	26	0	118	0
Metalurh Zaporizhya	2005–06	Ukrainian Premier League	12	0	0	0	—		—		12	0
Beitar Jerusalem	2005–06	Israeli Premier League	10	1	2	1	0	0	—		12	2
Energie Cottbus (loan)	2006–07	Bundesliga	27	0	1	0	—		—		28	0
Energie Cottbus	2007–08	Bundesliga	32	0	1	0	—		—		33	0
Energie Cottbus	2008–09	Bundesliga	4	0	2	0	—		—		6	0
Energie Cottbus	2009–10	2. Bundesliga	13	0	2	0	—		—		15	0
Energie Cottbus	Total		76	0	6	0	—		—		82	0
Beerschot (Loan)	2008–09	Belgian Pro League	16	0			—		—		16	0
CSKA Sofia	2009–10	A PFG	4	0	0	0	—		—		4	0
Neftchi Baku	2010–11	APL	30	1	3	0	—		—		33	1
Neftchi Baku	2011–12	APL	27	0	6	0	—		1	0	35	10
Neftchi Baku	2012–13	APL	27	0	4	0	—		11	0	45	8
Neftchi Baku	2013–14	APL	17	0	1	0	—		2	0	20	0
Neftchi Baku	Total		101	1	20	0	—		14	0	135	1
Career total			338	2	22	1	—		42	0	403	3

== Honours ==
Spartak Moscow

- Russian Premier League: 2001
- Russian Cup: 2003

Neftchi Baku

- Azerbaijan Premier League: 2010–11, 2011–12, 2012–13
- Azerbaijan Cup: 2012–13
