= Adnan Gušo =

Bosnian footballer (born 1975)

Personal information
- Date of birth: 30 November 1975 (age 50)
- Place of birth: Sarajevo, SFR Yugoslavia
- Height: 1.98 m (6 ft 6 in)
- Position: Goalkeeper

Youth career
- 1984–1993: Željezničar

Senior career*
Years	Team	Apps	(Gls)
1993–1999	Željezničar	157	(0)
1999–2001	Erzurumspor	24	(0)
2000–2001	→ Željezničar (loan)	36	(0)
2001	Spartak Moscow	0	(0)
2002	→ Željezničar (loan)	15	(0)
2002	Sarajevo	0	(0)
2003–2005	Universitatea Craiova	72	(0)
2005	Dinamo București	3	(0)
2006	Arges Pitești	11	(0)
2006–2007	Pandurii Târgu-Jiu	37	(0)
2008	Olympiakos Nicosia	4	(0)
2011–2012	Željezničar	20	(0)
Total		379	(0)

International career
1996–1997	Bosnia and Herzegovina U21	8	(0)
1999–2007	Bosnia and Herzegovina	22	(0)

Managerial career
- 2008–2011: Željezničar (goalkeeping coach)
- 2016–2017: Bosnia and Herzegovina (goalkeeping coach)
- 2019–2021: Željezničar (goalkeeping coach)
- 2024–2026: Željezničar (goalkeeping coach)
- * Club domestic league appearances and goals

Adnan Gušo (born 30 November 1975) is a Bosnian former professional football goalkeeper and goalkeeping coach.

== Club career ==
=== Bosnia and Herzegovina ===
Born in Sarajevo, Gušo started his career at hometown club Željezničar. He was usually a regular first team choice and in 1998 he won a championship title. Soon he went abroad. After a short spell in Turkish Erzurumspor and Spartak Moscow, he signed a one-year contract with FK Sarajevo in summer 2002. Gušo shortly after went to Romania, where he played for several clubs. While in Bosnia, Gušo won three league titles, one cup and one supercup, all while playing for Željezničar.

=== Romania ===
Gušo was signed a three-and-a-half-year contract with FC Universitatea Craiova in January 2003, on free transfer.

After the relegation, he signed for FC Dinamo București in summer 2005 where he won the 2005 Romanian Supercup and then in January 2006 he signed a two-year deal with FC Argeș Pitești.

=== Cyprus ===
In January 2008, he moved to Olympiakos Nicosia but left the club the same year.

=== Return to Željezničar ===
In 2009, Gušo was named the goalkeeping coach of the first team of Željezničar. In 2011, he came out of retirement and played one more season for the club. He was still in the same time the goalkeeping coach. He won the double that season and once again retired.

== International career ==
Gušo made his debut for Bosnia and Herzegovina in an October 1999 UEFA Euro qualification match away against Scotland and has earned a total of 22 caps, scoring no goals.

He was not called up to Blaž Slišković's squad for the first four matches of UEFA Euro 2008 qualifying. At that time the first and second choice goalkeepers were Kenan Hasagić and Almir Tolja. Due to Fuad Muzurović’s appointment as head coach, both were dropped and Gušo played the remaining 8 games as first choice. His final international was a November 2007 UEFA Euro qualification match against Turkey.

== Coaching career ==
Gušo started his goalkeeping coach career in 2009 after finishing his career. He was appointed as a goalkeeper coach at Željezničar after Amar Osim was named manager. After 2 years as coach, Gušo paused his coaching career so that he could come out of retirement to once again be a player at Željezničar for one season.

In 2016, 4 years after finishing his playing career for a second time, he went back to coaching as he was appointed as the goalkeeper coach of the Bosnia and Herzegovina national team.

In July 2018, almost a year after leaving the national team, Gušo became the goalkeeper coach in the Youth Academy of Željezničar.

On 3 January 2019, he left the Youth Academy to once again become the goalkeeper coach in the first team of Željezničar after negotiations with Amar Osim who was in late December 2018 for a third time in his managerial career appointed as the manager of the club. In the middle of a seven game winless run in the 2020–21 league season, on 5 April 2021, Gušo decided to leave Osim's first team coaching staff and returned to Željezničar's Youth Academy. In April 2024, he returned to work in the first team.

== Honours ==
=== Player ===
Željezničar

- Bosnian First League: 1997–98
- Bosnian Premier League: 2000–01, 2001–02, 2011–12
- Bosnian Cup: 2000–01, 2011–12
- Bosnian Supercup: 1998

Dinamo București

- Supercupa României: 2005
