= 2002 in Russian football =

2002 season

2002 in Russian football was the first season of the Premier League, which was won by FC Lokomotiv Moscow (this was their first ever national title). The national team participated in the 2002 FIFA World Cup.

== National team ==
Russia national football team participated in the final tournament of the 2002 FIFA World Cup, where they finished third in Group H.

Date	Venue	Opponents	Score^{1}	Competition	Russia scorers	Match Report
13 February 2002	Lansdowne Road, Dublin (A)	Republic of Ireland	0–2	F		Sport-Express
27 March 2002	A. Le Coq Arena, Tallinn (A)	Estonia	1–2	F	Vladimir Beschastnykh	Sport-Express
17 April 2002	Stade de France, Saint-Denis (A)	France	0–0	F		Sport-Express
17 May 2002	Dynamo Stadium, Moscow (H)	Belarus	1–1 (4–5 on penalties)	FT	Andrei Solomatin	Sport-Express
19 May 2002	Dynamo Stadium, Moscow (H)	FR Yugoslavia	1–1 (5–6 on penalties)	FT	Dmitri Sychev	Sport-Express
5 June 2002	Wing Stadium, Kobe (N)	Tunisia	2–0	WC	Egor Titov, Valery Karpin	FIFA
9 June 2002	International Stadium, Yokohama (A)	Japan	0–1	WC		FIFA
14 June 2002	Ecopa Stadium, Shizuoka (N)	Belgium	2–3	WC	Vladimir Beschastnykh, Dmitri Sychev	FIFA
21 August 2002	Lokomotiv Stadium, Moscow (H)	Sweden	1–1	F	Aleksandr Kerzhakov	Sport-Express
7 September 2002	Lokomotiv Stadium, Moscow (H)	Republic of Ireland	4–2	ECQ	Andrey Karyaka, Vladimir Beschastnykh, Aleksandr Kerzhakov, 1 own goal	uefa
16 October 2002	Central Stadium, Volgograd (H)	Albania	4–1	ECQ	Aleksandr Kerzhakov, Sergei Semak (2), Viktor Onopko	uefa

1. Russia score given first

Key

- H = Home match
- A = Away match
- N = Neutral ground
- F = Friendly
- FT = Friendly tournament
- WC = 2002 FIFA World Cup, Group H
- ECQ = 2004 UEFA European Football Championship qualifying, Group 10

== Leagues ==
=== Premier League ===
Pos	Team	Pld	W	D	L	GF	GA	GD	Pts	Qualification or relegation
1	Lokomotiv Moscow (C)	30	19	9	2	46	14	+32	66	Qualification to Champions League third qualifying round (Note: The title was decided in a championship playoff as Lokomotiv Moscow and CSKA Moscow finished with equal points.)
2	CSKA Moscow	30	21	3	6	60	26	+34	66	Qualification to Champions League second qualifying round
3	Spartak Moscow	30	16	7	7	49	36	+13	55	Qualification to UEFA Cup first round
4	Torpedo Moscow (Note: Torpedo qualified for the UEFA Cup thanks to Spartak winning the Russian Cup in 2003.)	30	14	8	8	47	32	+15	50	Qualification to UEFA Cup qualifying round
5	Krylia Sovetov Samara	30	15	4	11	39	32	+7	49	
6	Saturn	30	13	8	9	41	37	+4	47	
7	Shinnik Yaroslavl	30	13	8	9	42	37	+5	47	
8	Dynamo Moscow	30	12	6	12	38	33	+5	42	
9	Rotor Volgograd	30	11	5	14	27	34	−7	38	
10	Zenit St. Petersburg	30	8	9	13	36	42	−6	33	
11	Rostselmash	30	7	10	13	29	49	−20	31	
12	Alania Vladikavkaz	30	8	6	16	31	42	−11	30	
13	Uralan Elista	30	6	11	13	32	42	−10	29	
14	Torpedo-ZIL Moscow	30	6	10	14	20	39	−19	28	
15	Anzhi Makhachkala (R)	30	5	10	15	22	43	−21	25	Relegation to First Division
16	Sokol Saratov (R)	30	5	8	17	24	45	−21	23	Relegation to First Division

Source: RFPL
Rules for classification: 1) points; 2) goal difference; 3) number of goals scored.
(C) Champions; (R) Relegated

=== First Division ===
Rubin Kazan and Chernomorets Novorossiysk won the promotion from the First Division.

Pos	Team	Pld	W	D	L	GF	GA	GD	Pts	Promotion or relegation
1	Rubin Kazan (P)	34	22	6	6	51	14	+37	72	Promotion to Premier League
2	Chernomorets Novorossiysk (P)	34	20	10	4	59	29	+30	70	Promotion to Premier League
3	Tom Tomsk	34	17	10	7	51	23	+28	61	
4	Kuban Krasnodar	34	15	9	10	44	30	+14	54	
5	Amkar Perm	34	15	9	10	47	31	+16	54	
6	Spartak Nalchik	34	14	11	9	42	30	+12	53	
7	Khimki	34	14	10	10	38	27	+11	52	
8	Lada-Togliatti	34	13	11	10	54	35	+19	50	
9	Lokomotiv Chita	34	12	9	13	38	46	−8	45	
10	Kristall Smolensk	34	12	8	14	39	43	−4	44	
11	Gazovik-Gazprom	34	10	14	10	34	32	+2	44	
12	SKA-Khabarovsk	34	10	12	12	35	37	−2	42	
13	Fakel Voronezh	34	10	10	14	34	42	−8	40	
14	Neftekhimik Nizhnekamsk	34	11	5	18	34	49	−15	38	
15	Volgar-Gazprom Astrakhan	34	10	6	18	34	51	−17	36	
16	Dynamo St. Petersburg (Note: Dynamo SPb were awarded 0–3 defeats in ten matches for fielding ineligible players)	34	9	9	16	28	56	−28	36	
17	SKA Rostov-on-Don (R)	34	8	7	19	38	62	−24	31	Relegation to Second Division
18	Metallurg Krasnoyarsk (Note: Metallurg were docked 24 points for failing to pay transfer fees for four players) (R)	34	4	4	26	24	87	−63	−8	Relegation to Second Division

Source: PFL, RSSSF
(P) Promoted; (R) Relegated
Notes:

Vyacheslav Kamoltsev of Chernomorets became the top goalscorer with 20 goals.

=== Second Division ===
The following clubs have earned promotion by winning tournaments in their respective Second Division zones:

- FC Baltika Kaliningrad (West)
- FC Metallurg Lipetsk (Centre)
- FC Terek Grozny (South)
- FC Svetotekhnika Saransk (Povolzhye)
- FC Uralmash Yekaterinburg (Ural)
- FC Metallurg-Zapsib Novokuznetsk (East)

== Cup ==
The Russian Cup was won by CSKA Moscow, who beat Zenit Saint Petersburg 2–0 in the final at the Luzhniki Stadium.

== UEFA club competitions ==
=== 2001–02 UEFA Cup ===
Lokomotiv Moscow participated in the third round of the 2001–02 UEFA Cup, but were knocked out by Hapoel Tel Aviv FC who won 3–1 on aggregate.

=== 2002 UEFA Intertoto Cup ===
Krylya Sovetov Samara played in the 2002 UEFA Intertoto Cup. After defeating Dinaburg FC in the second round they lost to Willem II Tilburg on away goals.

=== 2002–03 UEFA Champions League ===
Lokomotiv Moscow's victory over Grazer AK ensured there are two Russian clubs in the group stage of the 2002–03 UEFA Champions League. Lokomotiv finished second in the group with Club Brugge, Galatasaray, and the dominant FC Barcelona.

On the contrary, Spartak Moscow, the automatic qualifiers for the group stage, lost all their matches to Valencia CF, FC Basel, and Liverpool F.C., finishing with the goal differential of 1–18.

=== 2002–03 UEFA Cup ===
Zenit Saint Petersburg set the record for aggregate score for the Russian teams, beating FC Encamp 13–0 in the qualifying round of the 2002–03 UEFA Cup and joining CSKA Moscow in the first round. Both Russian clubs lost in the first round, Zenit to Grasshopper Club Zürich (3–4) and CSKA to Parma F.C. (3–4).
