= Samuel Ogunsania =

Nigerian footballer

Seyi Samuel Ogunsanya
Personal information
- Date of birth: 1 March 1980 (age 46)
- Place of birth: Lagos, Nigeria
- Height: 1.75 m (5 ft 9 in)
- Position: Defender

Senior career*
Years	Team	Apps	(Gls)
1995–1997	Enugu Rangers		
1998–1999	Shooting Stars F.C.		
2000–2001	Katsina United		
2002	Enyimba		
2002	FC Spartak Moscow	3	(0)
2003–2004	Enyimba		
2005	Shooting Stars F.C.		
2006	Sharks F.C.		
2007	Dolphins FC		
2008–2010	Rockford Rampage (indoor)		

International career
2000	Nigeria	2	(0)
- * Club domestic league appearances and goals

Samuel Ogunsanya (born 1 March 1980) is a former Nigerian professional footballer.

== Career ==
Ogunsanya made his debut in the Russian Premier League in 2002 for FC Spartak Moscow. He played 3 game in the UEFA Champions League 2002–03 for FC Spartak Moscow.

=== Honours ===
- CAF Champions League champion: 2003, 2004.
- Nigerian Premier League champion: 1998, 2002, 2003.
- Nigerian Premier League runner-up: 2000, 2004.
- CBN Cup champion: 1994, 1995
- Pepsi Professional League champion: 2001
- African Champion of Champion (Super Cup) champion: 1998, 2004
- Nigerian FA Cup winner: 2007.
- Nigerian FA Cup bronze: 1997
- Russian Premier League bronze: 2002.
- Major Indoor Soccer League silver: 2010
- West African Football Union champion: 1998
