= Dmitri Ananko =

Russian footballer and coach

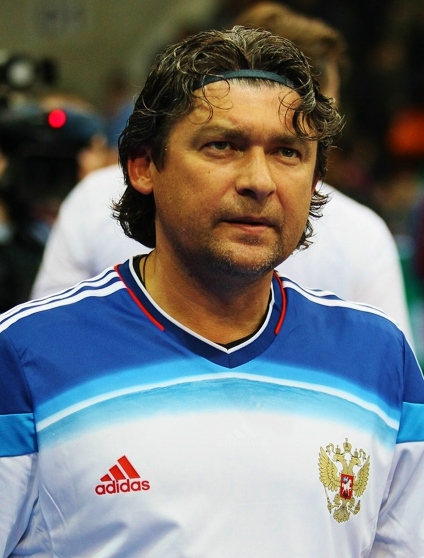
- Dmitri Ananko in 2015

Personal information
- Full name: Dmitri Vasilyevich Ananko
- Date of birth: 29 September 1973 (age 53)
- Place of birth: Novocherkassk, USSR
- Height: 1.77 m (5 ft 10 in)
- Position: Defender

Youth career
- RO UOR Rostov-on-Don

Senior career*
Years	Team	Apps	(Gls)
1991–2002	Spartak Moscow	150	(1)
1992–1999	Spartak-2 Moscow	60	(4)
1995	→ Rostselmash Rostov-on-Don (loan)	12	(0)
2002–2003	Ajaccio	18	(0)
2003	Torpedo-Metallurg Moscow	3	(0)
2004	Lukoil Chelyabinsk	11	(0)
2007	Inter-MChS Moscow		
Total		254	(5)

International career
1992	Russia U-21	1	(0)
1993	Russia U-20	4	(1)
2001	Russia	1	(0)

Managerial career
- 2003–2004: Torpedo-Metallurg Moscow (director of sports)
- 2011–2015: Arsenal Tula (assistant)
- 2015–2016: Spartak Moscow (assistant)
- 2023–2024: Pari Nizhny Novgorod (assistant)
- * Club domestic league appearances and goals

Dmitri Vasilyevich Ananko (Russian: Дмитрий Васильевич Aнaнкo; born 29 September 1973) is a Russian football coach and a former association football player.

== Honours ==
- Russian Premier League winner in 1992, 1993, 1994, 1996, 1997, 1998, 1999, 2000, 2001
- Soviet Cup winner in 1992
- Russian Cup winner in 1994, 1998
- Legends Cup winner in 2009

== Career statistics ==
Club	Season	League			Cup		Continental		Total	
Club	Season	Division	Apps	Goals	Apps	Goals	Apps	Goals	Apps	Goals
Spartak Moscow	1991	Soviet Top League	7	0	4	0	0	0	11	0
Spartak Moscow	1992	Russian Premier League	2	0	1	0	0	0	3	0
Spartak Moscow	1993	Russian Premier League	11	0	1	0	4 (Note: Appearances in the UEFA Champions League)	0	16	0
Spartak Moscow	1994	Russian Premier League	6	0	2	0	2	0	10	0
Spartak Moscow	1995	Russian Premier League	3	0	1	0	2	0	6	0
Spartak Moscow	1996	Russian Premier League	30	1	2	0	8 (Note: Two appearances in the UEFA Champions League, six appearances in the UEFA Cup)	0	40	1
Spartak Moscow	1997	Russian Premier League	25	0	4	0	7 (Note: Two appearances in the UEFA Champions League, five appearances in the UEFA Cup)	0	36	0
Spartak Moscow	1998	Russian Premier League	19	0	2	0	12 (Note: Four appearances in the UEFA Cup, eight appearances in the UEFA Champions League)	0	33	0
Spartak Moscow	1999	Russian Premier League	7	0	0	0	1	0	8	0
Spartak Moscow	2000	Russian Premier League	6	0	1	0	7	0	14	0
Spartak Moscow	2001	Russian Premier League	13	0	0	0	6	0	19	0
Spartak Moscow	2002	Russian Premier League	21	0	–		–		21	0
Spartak Moscow	Total		150	1	18	0	49	0	217	1
Spartak-2 Moscow	1992	Russian Second League	10	0	1	0	–		11	0
Spartak-2 Moscow	1993	Russian Second League	23	2	1	0	–		24	2
Spartak-2 Moscow	1994	Russian Third League	13	2	–		–		13	2
Spartak-2 Moscow	1995	Russian Third League	10	0	–		–		10	0
Spartak-2 Moscow	1999	Russian Second League	4	0	–		–		4	0
Spartak-2 Moscow	Total		60	4	2	0	0	0	62	4
Rostselmash Rostov-on-Don (loan)	1995	Russian Premier League	12	0	–		–		12	0
Ajaccio	2002–03	Ligue 1	18	0	0	0	–		18	0
Torpedo-Metallurg Moscow	2003	Russian Premier League	3	0	1	0	–		4	0
Lukoil Chelyabinsk	2004	Russian Second League	11	0	0	0	–		11	0
Career total			254	5	21	0	49	0	324	5
