= Dmitri Kudryashov =

Russian footballer

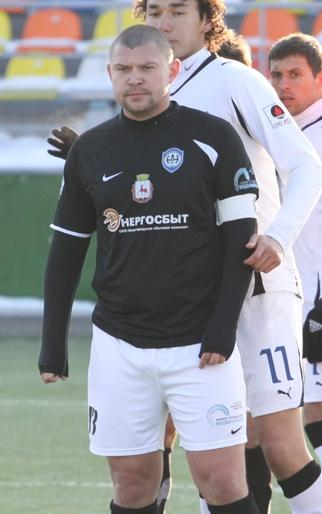
- Kudryashov with Nizhny Novgorod in 2012

Personal information
- Full name: Dmitri Alexandrovich Kudryashov
- Date of birth: 13 May 1983 (age 43)
- Place of birth: Nizhnekamsk, Russian SFSR
- Height: 1.77 m (5 ft 9 1/2 in)
- Position: Midfielder

Team information
- Current team: FC Arsenal Tula (assistant coach)

Senior career*
Years	Team	Apps	(Gls)
1997–1998	FC Dynamo Izhevsk	24	(2)
1999–2001	AS Saint-Étienne (B team)	9	(4)
2002	FC Spartak Moscow	22	(5)
2003–2005	FC Krylia Sovetov Samara	17	(2)
2005	FC Anzhi Makhachkala	10	(0)
2006	FK Ditton	24	(2)
2007–2008	FC Shinnik Yaroslavl	56	(9)
2009	FC Luch-Energiya Vladivostok	32	(3)
2010	FC Saturn Moscow Oblast	1	(0)
2010	FC Luch-Energiya Vladivostok	11	(1)
2011–2012	FC Nizhny Novgorod	50	(7)
2012–2013	FC Volga Nizhny Novgorod	15	(0)
2013	FC Torpedo Moscow	6	(0)
2013–2014	FC Luch-Energiya Vladivostok	18	(4)
2014–2016	FC Spartak-2 Moscow	27	(2)
2017	FC Anzhi Makhachkala	0	(0)
2017	FC Anzhi-Yunior Zelenodolsk	14	(4)
2018	FC Krylia Sovetov-2 Samara	4	(0)
2018–2019	FC Murom	23	(3)

International career
2002–2004	Russia U-21	11	(1)

Managerial career
- 2018–2019: FC Murom (player-assistant)
- 2020: FC Murom (assistant)
- 2021: FC Noah (assistant)
- 2022: FC Ararat-Armenia (assistant)
- 2022–2023: FC Urartu (assistant)
- 2023–2024: FC Urartu (sporting director)
- 2024–2025: FC Urartu (assistant)
- 2025–: FC Arsenal Tula (assistant)
- * Club domestic league appearances and goals

Dmitri Alexandrovich Kudryashov (Russian: Дмитрий Александрович Кудряшов, born 13 May 1983) is a Russian football coach and a former player. He is an assistant coach with FC Arsenal Tula.

== Club career ==
He made his Russian Premier League debut for FC Spartak Moscow on 8 March 2002 in a game against FC Rostselmash Rostov-on-Don.
