= Artyom Bezrodny =

Russian footballer

Personal information
- Full name: Artyom Anatolyevich Bezrodny
- Date of birth: 10 February 1979
- Place of birth: Sumy, Ukrainian SSR
- Date of death: 13 September 2016 (aged 37)
- Place of death: Sumy, Ukraine
- Height: 1.80 m (5 ft 11 in)
- Position: Midfielder

Youth career
- 1986–1991: Youth Sportive School Sumy
- 1991–1995: Youth Sportive School Luhansk

Senior career*
Years	Team	Apps	(Gls)
1995–1996	FC Spartak Moscow	10	(0)
1997–1998	Bayer Leverkusen	0	(0)
1998–2004	FC Spartak Moscow	45	(10)
2005	FK MKT Araz	4	(0)

International career
1999–2001	Russia U-21	15	(4)
1999	Russia	1	(0)
- * Club domestic league appearances and goals

Artyom Anatolyevich Bezrodny (Russian: Артём Анатольевич Безродный; 10 February 1979 – 13 September 2016) was a Ukrainia and Russian association footballer.

== Career ==
In 1995, he moved from Ukraine to Russia and eventually accepted Russian citizenship. In Germany he played for Bayer 04 Leverkusen II.

== International career ==
Bezrodny played one game for the Russia national football team in a Euro 2000 qualifier against Andorra on 8 September 1999.
