= Eduard Tsykhmeystruk =

Ukrainian footballer

Personal information
- Full name: Eduard Mykolayovych Tsykhmeystruk
- Date of birth: 24 June 1973 (age 53)
- Place of birth: Makiivka, Ukrainian SSR
- Height: 1.70 m (5 ft 7 in)
- Position: Midfielder

Youth career
- Shakhtar Makiivka

Senior career*
Years	Team	Apps	(Gls)
1989–1991	Shakhtar Donetsk	0	(0)
1991	Vahonobudivnyk Stakhanov	2	(0)
1992	Elektron Romny	22	(5)
1992–1993	Antratsyt Kirovske	15	(2)
1993	Medita Shakhtarsk	21	(5)
1993–1994	Boryspil	21	(2)
1994	Nyva Vinnytsia	5	(1)
1994–1996	CSKA-Borysfen Boryspil	62	(3)
1996–2000	CSKA Kyiv	109	(12)
1997–1999	→ CSKA-2 Kyiv	4	(0)
2000–2001	Levski Sofia	12	(1)
2001–2002	Spartak Moscow	35	(5)
2002–2003	Metalurh Donetsk	27	(1)
2004–2007	Illichivets Mariupol	89	(8)
2007	Zorya Luhansk	16	(1)
2008	Vorskla Poltava	6	(0)
2008–2010	Irpin Horenychi	3	(0)
2011–2013	Makiivvuhillya Makiivka	42	(3)
2013	Mezhyhirya Novi Petrivtsi		
2013	NPHU Makiivka	1	(0)
2013	Yednist Plysky	1	(0)
2014	Yevrobis-Ahrobiznes Kyiv	0	(0)
2016	Retro Vatutine		
2018	Desna Pohreby	5	(0)
2019–2020	Hatne		

International career
1998–1999	Ukraine	7	(0)
- * Club domestic league appearances and goals

Eduard Mykolayovych Tsykhmeystruk (Ukrainian: Едуард Миколайович Цихмейструк; born 24 June 1973) is a Ukrainian former professional footballer.

== Club career ==
He made his professional debut in the Soviet Second League B in 1991 for FC Vahonobudivnyk Stakhanov. He played 6 games in the 2001–02 UEFA Champions League for FC Spartak Moscow.

== Honours ==
- Bulgarian A Professional Football Group champion: 2001.
- Russian Premier League champion: 2001.
- Russian Premier League bronze: 2002.
- Russian Cup winner: 2003 (played in the early stages of the 2002/03 tournament for FC Spartak Moscow).
- Ukrainian Premier League bronze: 2003.
