= Okon Flo Essien =

Nigerian footballer

Personal information
- Full name: Okon Flo Essien
- Date of birth: December 31, 1981 (age 44)
- Place of birth: Calabar, Nigeria
- Height: 1.86 m (6 ft 1 in)
- Position: Striker

Youth career
- Calabar Rovers

Senior career*
Years	Team	Apps	(Gls)
1997	Calabar Rovers		
1998–1999	Eagle Cement		
1999–2000	Sharks F.C.		
2001	Dolphins F.C.		
2001–2003	FC Spartak Moscow	14	(0)
2003–2007	Dolphins F.C.		
2008	Đồng Tháp F.C.		
2009	Tây Ninh F.C.		
- * Club domestic league appearances and goals

Okon Flo Essien (born December 31, 1981) is a former Nigerian professional footballer.

== Club career ==
He made his debut in the Russian Premier League in 2001 for FC Spartak Moscow and played 2 games in the 2002–03 UEFA Champions League.

== Honours ==
- Nigerian FA Cup winner: 2001.
- Russian Premier League champion: 2001.
- Russian Cup winner: 2003.
