= Aleksandr Danishevsky =

Russian footballer (born 1984)

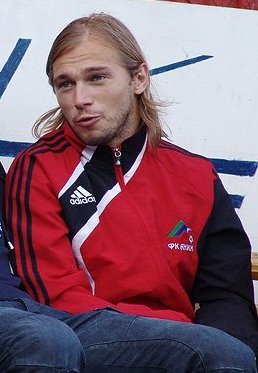

Personal information
- Full name: Aleksandr Vladimirovich Danishevsky
- Date of birth: 23 February 1984 (age 42)
- Place of birth: Sevastopol, Ukrainian SSR, Soviet Union
- Height: 1.74 m (5 ft 8 1/2 in)
- Position: Forward

Youth career
- Academica Moscow

Senior career*
| Years | Team | Apps | (Gls) |
| 2001–2004 | Spartak Moscow | 40 | (4) |
| 2004–2005 | Khimki | 45 | (12) |
| 2006 | Torpedo Moscow | 12 | (2) |
| 2006–2007 | Kuban Krasnodar | 16 | (5) |
| 2007 | → Rostov (loan) | 5 | (0) |
| 2008 | Arsenal Kyiv | 9 | (0) |
| 2008 | Sportakademklub Moscow | 13 | (5) |
| 2009 | Anzhi Makhachkala | 8 | (1) |
| 2010 | Zhemchuzhina-Sochi | 23 | (1) |
| 2011 | Khimki | 12 | (1) |
| 2012–2013 | Sevastopol | 23 | (4) |
| 2012–2013 | → Sevastopol-2 | 6 | (2) |
| 2013 | Belshina Bobruisk | 9 | (5) |
| 2014 | Zirka Kirovohrad | 5 | (0) |
| 2014–2016 | SKChF Sevastopol | 15 | (2) |
| 2016–2017 | Gvardeyets Gvardeyskoye | | |
| 2017 | Kamo Sevastopol | | |

International career^{‡}
| 2002 | Russia U19 | 12 | (5) |
| 2002 | Russia U21 | 1 | (0) |
- * Club domestic league appearances and goals as of 31 May 2016 ‡ National team caps and goals as of 21 August 2002

Aleksandr Vladimirovich Danishevsky (Russian: Александр Владимирович Данишевский; born 23 February 1984) is a Russian former professional footballer.

== Club career ==
He made his debut in the Russian Premier League in 2001 for Spartak Moscow. He played 1 game for Spartak Moscow in the UEFA Champions League 2001–02, 6 games in the UEFA Champions League 2002–03 and 3 games in the UEFA Cup 2003–04. On 1 September 2014, he signed for FC SKChF Sevastopol, which plays in Zone South of the Russian Second Division.

== Honours ==
- Russian Premier League champion: 2001.
- Russian Premier League bronze: 2002.
- Russian Cup winner: 2003.
- Russian Cup finalist: 2005.
