= Maksym Levytskyi =

Ukrainian footballer

Personal information
- Full name: Maksym Anatoliyovych Levytskyi
- Date of birth: 26 November 1972 (age 53)
- Place of birth: Shakhty, Rostov Oblast, Soviet Union
- Height: 1.88 m (6 ft 2 in)
- Position: Goalkeeper

Senior career*
| Years | Team | Apps | (Gls) |
| 1992–1999 | Tavriya Simferopol | 158 | (0) |
| 1999–2000 | Chernomorets Novorossiysk | 29 | (0) |
| 2000–2001 | Saint-Étienne | 14 | (0) |
| 2001–2002 | Spartak Moscow | 39 | (0) |
| 2003–2004 | Chernomorets Novorossiysk | 20 | (0) |
| 2004–2005 | Dynamo Moscow | 19 | (0) |
| 2005–2006 | Sibir Novosibirsk | 27 | (0) |
| 2007 | Terek Grozny | 40 | (0) |
| 2008 | Rostov | 3 | (0) |
| 2009 | Torpedo-ZIL Moscow | 5 | (0) |
| Total | | 354 | (0) |

International career
| 2000–2002 | Ukraine | 8 | (0) |
- * Club domestic league appearances and goals

Maksym Anatoliyovych Levytskyi (Ukrainian: Максим Анатолійович Левицький; Russian: Макси́м Анато́льевич Леви́цкий; born 26 November 1972) is a retired Ukrainian footballer who played as a goalkeeper.

== Club career ==
In January 2001, Levytskyi was involved in a fake passport scandal in which he used a purported Greek passport to play for French Ligue 1 club AS Saint-Étienne as a European Union citizen; Brazilian teammate Alex Dias used a fake Portuguese passport. The pair were given four-month bans with two more months suspended, and Saint-Étienne were deducted seven points, leading to their relegation.

== International career ==
In 2009, Levytskyi committed to be a part of the 2009 Maccabiah Games football squad representing Russia. When the match dates conflicted with league play, Levytskyi pulled from the squad.

== Honours ==
- Russian Premier League champion: 2001.
- Russian Premier League bronze: 2002.
- Russian Cup winner: 2003 (played for FC Spartak Moscow in the early stages of the 2002/03 competition).

== European club competitions ==
With FC Spartak Moscow.

- UEFA Champions League 2001–02: 4 games.
- UEFA Champions League 2002–03: 3 games.
