= Aleksandr Sonin =

Russian footballer

Personal information
- Full name: Aleksandr Nikolayevich Sonin
- Date of birth: 6 August 1983 (age 43)
- Place of birth: Zheleznogorsk, Kursk Oblast, Russian SFSR
- Height: 1.75 m (5 ft 9 in)
- Position: Striker

Youth career
- SDYuShOR-3 Oryol
- Dynamo Moscow
- 1999–2000: Lausanne-Sport

Senior career*
Years	Team	Apps	(Gls)
2000–2001	Saint-Étienne II	7	(0)
2001–2005	Spartak Moscow	10	(2)
2003	→ Dynamo-2 Kyiv (loan)	14	(1)
2003	→ Dynamo-3 Kyiv (loan)	1	(0)
2003	→ Arsenal Kyiv (loan)	1	(0)
2003	→ CSKA Kyiv (loan)	9	(2)
2006	Ditton	26	(7)
2007–2008	Shinnik Yaroslavl	13	(1)
2008	Nizhny Novgorod	30	(9)

International career
1998	Russia U17	1	(1)
2003	Russia U21	1	(0)
- * Club domestic league appearances and goals

Aleksandr Nikolayevich Sonin (Russian: Александр Николаевич Сонин; born 6 August 1983) is a Russian former professional footballer.

== Club career ==
He made his professional debut in the Russian Premier League in 2001 for FC Spartak Moscow. He played 2 games in the UEFA Champions League 2002–03 for FC Spartak Moscow.

== Honours ==
- Russian Premier League champion: 2001.
- Russian Premier League bronze: 2002.
- Russian Cup winner: 2003.
