= Zurab Tsiklauri =

Russian footballer

Personal information
- Full name: Zurab Sergeyevich Tsiklauri
- Date of birth: 3 June 1974 (age 52)
- Place of birth: Kuybyshev, Russian SFSR
- Height: 1.84 m (6 ft 1/2 in)
- Position: Midfielder

Senior career*
Years	Team	Apps	(Gls)
1993	FC Krylia Sovetov Samara	1	(0)
1993–1994	FC SKD Samara	54	(21)
1995–2000	FC Krylia Sovetov Samara	153	(27)
2001–2004	FC Uralan Elista	83	(35)
2004	FC Alania Vladikavkaz	12	(2)
2005	FC Luch-Energiya Vladivostok	33	(12)
2006	FC Yunit Samara	19	(13)
- * Club domestic league appearances and goals

Zurab Sergeyevich Tsiklauri (Russian: Зураб Серге́евич Циклаури; born 3 June 1974) is a Russian former professional footballer.

== Club career ==
He made his professional debut in the Russian Premier League in 1993 for FC Krylia Sovetov Samara.
