= 2003 PFC CSKA Moscow season =

CSKA
2003 season
- Manager: Valery Gazzaev
- Stadium: Dynamo Stadium; Eduard Streltsov Stadium
- Premier League: Champions
- Russian Cup: Progressed to 2004 season
- Super Cup: Runners-up
- Russian Premier League Cup: Round of 16 (vs. Zenit St.Petersburg)
- UEFA Champions League: Second qualifying round (vs. Vardar)
- Top goalscorer: League: Rolan Gusev (9 goals); All: Rolan Gusev; Jiří Jarošík (10 each)
| Home colours | Away colours |

The 2003 CSKA season was the club's twelfth season in the Russian Premier League, the highest tier of association football in Russia.

== Squad ==
As of match played 8 November 2003

| Number | Name | Nationality | Position | Date of birth (age) | Signed from | Signed in | Contract ends | Apps. | Goals |
Goalkeepers
| 1 | Veniamin Mandrykin | (Russia) | GK | 30 August 1981 (aged 22) | Alania Vladikavkaz | 2001 | | 53 | 0 |
| 30 | Dmitry Kramarenko | (Azerbaijan) | GK | 12 September 1974 (aged 29) | Dynamo Moscow | 2002 | | 4 | 0 |
| 35 | Igor Akinfeev | (Russia) | GK | 8 April 1986 (aged 17) | Academy | 2003 | | 18 | 0 |
| 40 | Denis Trunkin | (Russia) | GK | 1 January 1985 (aged 18) | Academy | 2003 | | 0 | 0 |
Defenders
| 2 | Deividas Šemberas | (Lithuania) | DF | 2 August 1978 (aged 25) | Dynamo Moscow | 2002 | | 59 | 0 |
| 3 | Andrei Solomatin | (Russia) | DF | 9 September 1975 (aged 28) | Lokomotiv Moscow | 2001 | | 64 | 4 |
| 6 | Aleksei Berezutski | (Russia) | DF | 20 June 1982 (aged 21) | Torpedo-ZIL Moscow | 2001 | | 53 | 0 |
| 17 | Ruslan Nakhushev | (Russia) | DF | 5 September 1984 (aged 19) | Spartak Nalchik | 2002 | | 2 | 0 |
| 23 | Denis Yevsikov | (Russia) | DF | 19 February 1981 (aged 22) | Academy | 1999 | | 100 | 0 |
| 24 | Vasili Berezutski | (Russia) | DF | 20 June 1982 (aged 21) | Torpedo-ZIL Moscow | 2002 | | 28 | 0 |
| 28 | Bohdan Shershun | (Ukraine) | DF | 20 June 1982 (aged 21) | Dnipro Dnipropetrovsk | 2002 | | 55 | 2 |
| 37 | Oleg Malyukov | (Russia) | DF | 16 January 1985 (aged 18) | Academy | 2001 | | 1 | 0 |
| 38 | Sergei Gorelov | (Russia) | DF | 29 April 1985 (aged 18) | Academy | 2003 | | 0 | 0 |
| 39 | Ivan Taranov | (Russia) | DF | 22 June 1986 (aged 17) | Chernomorets Novorossiysk | 2002 | | 2 | 0 |
| 48 | Vitaliy Denisov | (Uzbekistan) | DF | 23 February 1987 (aged 16) | Sportakademklub Moscow | 2003 | | 0 | 0 |
| 49 | Sergei Grichenkov | (Russia) | DF | 8 July 1986 (aged 17) | Academy | 2002 | | 1 | 0 |
| 60 | Yevgeni Klimov | (Russia) | DF | 21 January 1985 (aged 18) | Academy | 2002 | | 1 | 0 |
Midfielders
| 5 | Sergei Semak | (Russia) | MF | 27 February 1976 (aged 27) | Asmaral Moscow | 1994 | | 284 | 74 |
| 7 | Igor Yanovsky | (Russia) | MF | 3 August 1974 (aged 29) | Paris Saint-Germain | 2001 | | 80 | 11 |
| 8 | Rolan Gusev | (Russia) | MF | 17 September 1977 (aged 26) | Dynamo Moscow | 2002 | | 67 | 26 |
| 18 | Aleksandr Berketov | (Russia) | MF | 24 December 1975 (aged 27) | Rotor Volgograd | 2001 | | 22 | 0 |
| 19 | Juris Laizāns | (Latvia) | MF | 6 January 1979 (aged 24) | Skonto Riga | 2001 | | 87 | 4 |
| 20 | Jiří Jarošík | (Czech Republic) | MF | 27 October 1977 (aged 26) | Sparta Prague | 2003 | | 32 | 10 |
| 25 | Elvir Rahimić | (Bosnia and Herzegovina) | MF | 4 April 1976 (aged 27) | Anzhi Makhachkala | 2001 | | 83 | 1 |
| 29 | Artur Tlisov | (Russia) | MF | 10 June 1982 (aged 21) | Chernomorets Novorossiysk | 2002 | | 8 | 1 |
| 36 | Aleksei Nikolayev | (Russia) | MF | 12 January 1985 (aged 18) | Academy | 2003 | | 1 | 0 |
| 41 | Nikolay Vorobyev | (Russia) | MF | 21 March 1985 (aged 18) | Academy | 2003 | | 1 | 0 |
| 42 | Andrei Trofimov | (Russia) | MF | 2 July 1985 (aged 18) | Neftekhimik Nizhnekamsk | 2002 | | 0 | 0 |
| 54 | Yuriy Kulbyakin | (Russia) | MF | 26 August 1983 (aged 20) | Academy | 2003 | | 0 | 0 |
| 58 | Anton Pushkarev | (Russia) | MF | 29 April 1985 (aged 18) | Academy | 2003 | | 1 | 0 |
Forwards
| 9 | Ivica Olić | (Croatia) | FW | 14 September 1979 (aged 24) | Dinamo Zagreb | 2003 | | 12 | 9 |
| 11 | Spartak Gogniyev | (Russia) | FW | 19 January 1981 (aged 22) | Dynamo Moscow | 2001 | | 53 | 9 |
| 13 | Sergey Samodin | (Russia) | FW | 14 February 1985 (aged 18) | Krasnodar-2000 | 2002 | | 8 | 2 |
| 14 | Dmitri Kirichenko | (Russia) | FW | 17 January 1977 (aged 26) | Rostselmash | 2002 | | 59 | 23 |
| 21 | Denis Popov | (Russia) | FW | 4 February 1979 (aged 24) | Chernomorets Novorossiysk | 2001 | | 79 | 21 |
| 26 | Alexander Geynrikh | (Uzbekistan) | FW | 6 October 1984 (aged 19) | Pakhtakor Tashkent | 2003 | | 5 | 1 |
| 45 | Andrei Kireyev | (Russia) | FW | 6 July 1985 (aged 18) | Academy | 2003 | | 0 | 0 |
| 47 | Vardan Mazalov | (Russia) | FW | 14 October 1983 (aged 20) | Vityaz Podolsk | 2003 | | 1 | 0 |
| 59 | Innokenty Baranov | (Russia) | FW | 15 August 1985 (aged 18) | Academy | 2003 | | 1 | 0 |
Out on loan
| 22 | Andrei Tsaplin | (Russia) | DF | 22 January 1977 (aged 26) | Academy | 1996 | | 68 | 1 |
| 27 | Alan Kusov | (Russia) | MF | 11 August 1981 (aged 22) | Alania Vladikavkaz | 2003 | | 14 | 0 |
| | Renat Yanbayev | (Russia) | DF | 7 April 1984 (aged 19) | Academy | 2001 | | 0 | 0 |
| | Vladimir Kuzmichyov | (Russia) | MF | 28 July 1979 (aged 24) | Dynamo Kyiv | 2001 | | 16 | 0 |
| | Roman Monaryov | (Ukraine) | FW | 17 January 1980 (aged 23) | CSKA Kyiv | 2001 | | 24 | 3 |
Left During the Season
| 48 | Sergei Polyakov | (Russia) | MF | 21 May 1985 (aged 18) | Academy | 2003 | | 0 | 0 |
| 52 | Vyacheslav Akimochkin | (Russia) | FW | 21 February 1983 (aged 20) | Academy | 2002 | | 0 | 0 |
| 53 | Konstantin Kazakov | (Russia) | DF | 19 January 1984 (aged 19) | Academy | 2001 | | 0 | 0 |

== Transfers ==
=== Winter ===
In: Note: Flags indicate national team as defined under FIFA eligibility rules; some limited exceptions apply. Players may hold more than one non-FIFA nationality.

| No. | Pos. | Nation | Player |
|---|---|---|---|
| 20 | MF | CZE | Jiří Jarošík (from (Czech Republic) Sparta Prague) |
| 26 | FW | UZB | Alexander Geynrikh (from (Uzbekistan) Pakhtakor Tashkent) |
| 27 | MF | RUS | Alan Kusov (from (Russia) Alania Vladikavkaz) |
| 47 | FW | RUS | Vardan Mazalov (from (Russia) Vityaz Podolsk) |

Out: Note: Flags indicate national team as defined under FIFA eligibility rules; some limited exceptions apply. Players may hold more than one non-FIFA nationality.

| No. | Pos. | Nation | Player |
|---|---|---|---|
| 4 | DF | RUS | Yevgeni Varlamov (to (Russia) Chernomorets Novorossiysk) |
| 6 | DF | RUS | Vyacheslav Dayev (to (Russia) Shinnik Yaroslavl) |
| 17 | FW | UKR | Roman Monaryov (loan to (Russia) Torpedo-ZIL Moscow) |
| 22 | DF | RUS | Andrei Tsaplin (loan to (Russia) Sokol Saratov) |
| 27 | MF | RUS | Aleksei Triputen (to (Russia) Torpedo-ZIL Moscow) |
| 35 | GK | RUS | Ruslan Nigmatullin (loan return to (Italy) Hellas Verona) |
| — | DF | RUS | Renat Yanbayev (loan to (Russia) Anzhi Makhachkala) |

=== Summer ===
In: Note: Flags indicate national team as defined under FIFA eligibility rules; some limited exceptions apply. Players may hold more than one non-FIFA nationality.

| No. | Pos. | Nation | Player |
|---|---|---|---|
| 9 | FW | CRO | Ivica Olić (from (Croatia) Dinamo Zagreb) |

Out: Note: Flags indicate national team as defined under FIFA eligibility rules; some limited exceptions apply. Players may hold more than one non-FIFA nationality.

| No. | Pos. | Nation | Player |
|---|---|---|---|
| 27 | MF | RUS | Alan Kusov (loan to (Russia) Alania Vladikavkaz) |
| 48 | MF | RUS | Sergei Polyakov |
| 52 | FW | RUS | Vyacheslav Akimochkin |
| 53 | DF | RUS | Konstantin Kazakov |
| — | MF | RUS | Vladimir Kuzmichyov (loan to (Russia) Spartak Nalchik, previously on loan to FC Torpedo-ZIL Moscow) |

== Competitions ==
=== Super Cup ===
| 8 March 2003 | Lokomotiv Moscow | 1 – 1 (a.e.t.) (4 – 3 p) | CSKA Moscow | Moscow |
| 15:00 MSK (UTC+3) | Maminov (yellow card) 23'; Ovchinnikov (yellow card) 42'; Ignashevich (yellow card) 50'; Pashinin (yellow card) 59'; Pimenov 83' | Report | Jarošík 41'; Kusov (yellow card) 48'; Yanovsky (yellow card) 49'; V.Berezutski (yellow card) 61'; Rahimić (yellow card) 63'; Geynrikh (yellow card) 70'; Solomatin (yellow card) 99' | Stadium: Lokomotiv Stadium; Attendance: 15,000; Referee: Valentin Ivanov |
| | Penalties |
| | Loskov (penalty missed); Lekgetho (penalty missed); Izmailov (penalty missed); Maminov (penalty scored); Pimenov (penalty scored); Ignashevich (penalty scored); Pashinin (penalty scored) | | (penalty missed) Kirichenko; (penalty scored) Samodin; (penalty missed) Yevsikov; (penalty scored) Solomatin; (penalty missed) Gusev; (penalty scored) Rahimić; (penalty missed) Šemberas |

=== Premier League ===
==== Results by round ====
| Round | 1 | 2 | 3 | 4 | 5 | 6 | 7 | 8 | 9 | 10 | 11 | 12 | 13 | 14 | 15 | 16 | 17 | 18 | 19 | 20 | 21 | 22 | 23 | 24 | 25 | 26 | 27 | 28 | 29 | 30 |
|---|---|---|---|---|---|---|---|---|---|---|---|---|---|---|---|---|---|---|---|---|---|---|---|---|---|---|---|---|---|---|
| Ground | H | A | H | A | H | A | H | A | A | H | A | H | A | H | A | H | A | A | H | A | H | A | H | H | H | A | H | A | H | A |
| Result | W | W | W | W | L | W | W | D | W | W | W | D | D | W | L | D | W | L | W | D | W | L | W | D | W | W | D | D | W | L |

Updated to match(es) played on 1 November 2003. Source: See Results
A = Away; H = Home; W = Win; D = Draw; L = Loss

==== Results ====
| 16 March 2003 1 | CSKA Moscow | 4 – 0 | Rubin Kazan | Moscow |
| 15:00 MSK (UTC+3) | Jarošík 18', 77'; Semak 43'; V.Berezutski (yellow card) 47'; Kusov (yellow card) 57'; Kirichenko 87' | Report | Sharonov (yellow card) 81'; Scotti (yellow card) 90' | Stadium: Dynamo Stadium; Referee: Yu.Chebotarev |

| 22 March 2003 2 | Rotor Volgograd | 1 – 2 | CSKA Moscow | Volgograd |
| 16:00 MSK (UTC+3) | Romanov (yellow card) 42' | Report | Gusev 11'; Semak 14'; Popov (yellow card) 39'; Yanovsky (yellow card) 52'; Mandrykin (yellow card) 90' | Stadium: Central Profsoyuz Stadium; Referee: Aleksandr Gvardis |

| 6 April 2003 3 | CSKA Moscow | 3 – 2 | Spartak Moscow | Moscow |
| 16:00 MSK (DST) (UTC+4) | Rahimić (yellow card) 12'; Laizāns (yellow card) 35'; Semak 49'; Gusev 77' (pen.); Yanovsky (yellow card) 86'; Jarošík 90' | Report | Vashchuk (yellow card) 9'; Titov 33'; Pinheiro (yellow card) 47'; V.Berezutski 57' (o.g.) | Stadium: Dynamo Stadium; Referee: Valentin Ivanov |

| 12 April 2003 4 | Dynamo Moscow | 2 – 3 | CSKA Moscow | Moscow |
| 16:00 MSK (DST) (UTC+4) | Tanasijević (yellow card) 12'; Bulykin 25'; Česnauskis 80' | Report | Gogniyev 10' (yellow card) 74'; Jarošík 61'; Popov 76' | Stadium: Dynamo Stadium; Referee: I.Yegorov |

| 19 April 2003 5 | CSKA Moscow | 0 – 1 | Rostov | Moscow |
| 18:00 MSK (DST) (UTC+4) | Semak (penalty missed) 60'; Kusov (yellow card) 80' | Report | Maksymov (yellow card) 30'; Karpovich (yellow card) 36'; Kampamba (yellow card) 59' (goal) 76'; Blyznyuk (yellow card) 70' | Stadium: Dynamo Stadium; Referee: Sergey Lapochkin |

| 23 April 2003 6 | Chernomorets Novorossiysk | 0 – 1 | CSKA Moscow | Novorossiysk |
| 18:00 MSK (DST) (UTC+4) | Varlamov (yellow card) 10'; Cherkes (yellow card) 53' | Report | Gogniyev (yellow card) 25' (yellow-red card) 84' (goal) 70'; Rahimić (yellow card) 30'; Laizāns (yellow card) 36'; Šemberas (yellow card) 45'; Mandrykin (yellow card) 90' | Stadium: Central Stadium; Referee: Nikolai Ivanov |

| 5 May 2003 7 | CSKA Moscow | 2 – 0 | Lokomotiv Moscow | Moscow |
| 18:00 MSK (DST) (UTC+4) | Yanovsky 14'; Jarošík 38'; Kirichenko (yellow card) 56'; Šemberas (yellow card) 64'; Kusov (yellow card) 85' (yellow-red card) 86' | Report | Mnguni (yellow card) 39'; Obradović (yellow card) 48' | Stadium: Dynamo Stadium; Referee: Valentin Ivanov |

| 9 May 2003 8 | Saturn Ramenskoye | 2 – 2 | CSKA Moscow | Ramenskoye |
| 16:45 MSK (DST) (UTC+4) | Jović (yellow card) 39'; Medvedev 55'; Géder (yellow card) 77'; Pavlovich (yellow card) 87'; Bazayev 90' | Report | Kirichenko (yellow card) 9'; Yanovsky (yellow card) 48'; Popov 64' (yellow card) 77'; Rahimić 67'; Gusev (yellow card) 87' | Stadium: Saturn Stadium; Referee: I.Yegorov |

| 18 May 2003 9 | Alania Vladikavkaz | 0 – 1 | CSKA Moscow | Vladikavkaz |
| 17:00 MSK (DST) (UTC+4) | Ashvetia (yellow card) 47' | Report | Popov 10'; Gusev (yellow card) 18'; Yanovsky (yellow card) 27'; Jarošík (yellow card) 38'; Kusov (yellow card) 77'; Semak (yellow card) 88' | Stadium: Republican Spartak Stadium; Referee: A.Evstigneev |

| 24 May 2003 10 | CSKA Moscow | 1 – 0 | Torpedo-Metallurg | Moscow |
| 16:00 MSK (DST) (UTC+4) | Rahimić (yellow card) 42'; Kirichenko (yellow card) 45'; Semak 72'; Kusov (yellow card) 83'; Mandrykin (yellow card) 90' | Report | Shustikov (yellow card) 20'; Oganyan (yellow card) 90' | Stadium: Dynamo Stadium; Referee: M.Veselovsky |

| 31 May 2003 11 | Krylia Sovetov | 0 – 2 | CSKA Moscow | Samara |
| 16:00 MSK (DST) (UTC+4) | Karyaka (yellow card) 40' (penalty missed) 88'; Wright (yellow card) 83' | Report | Jarošík 10'; Gusev (yellow card) 20'; Shershun 36' (yellow card) 90'; Rahimić (yellow card) 39'; A.Berezutski (yellow card) 41'; Semak (yellow card) 45' | Stadium: Metallurg Stadium; Referee: Stanislav Sukhina |

| 12 June 2003 12 | CSKA Moscow | 2 – 2 | Shinnik Yaroslavl | Moscow |
| 19:00 MSK (DST) (UTC+4) | Laizāns (yellow card) 20'; Kirichenko 57'; Gusev 61'; V.Berezutski (yellow card) 64' | Report | Rubins 16'; Grishin (yellow card) 42'; Kushev 45'; Skokov (yellow card) 75' | Stadium: Dynamo Stadium; Referee: A.Tyumin |

| 18 June 2003 13 | Uralan Elista | 2 – 2 | CSKA Moscow | Elista |
| 19:00 MSK (DST) (UTC+4) | Dal Canto (yellow card) 32'; Kolodin 47' (yellow card) 58'; Semochko (yellow card) 50'; Tsiklauri 79' | Report | Popov (yellow card) 18'; Jarošík 48'; Solomatin (yellow card) 53'; A.Berezutski (yellow card) 72'; Vranješ (yellow card) 84'; Kirichenko 87' | Stadium: Uralan Stadium; Referee: Sergei Fursa |

| 22 June 2003 14 | CSKA Moscow | 2 – 0 | Torpedo Moscow | Moscow |
| 18:00 MSK (DST) (UTC+4) | Gusev (yellow card) 19'; Semak 50'; Rahimić (yellow card) 60'; Yanovsky 79' | Report | Leonchenko (yellow card) 42'; Makhmutov (yellow card) 61' | Stadium: Dynamo Stadium; Referee: Igor Zakharov |

| 28 June 2003 15 | Zenit St.Petersburg | 4 – 1 | CSKA Moscow | Saint Petersburg |
| 16:00 MSK (DST) (UTC+4) | Chiriță 25'; Radimov (yellow card) 26' (goal) 55'; Vještica (yellow card) 39'; Spivak 45' (pen.); Denisov (yellow card) 69'; Kerzhakov 81' | Report | Yanovsky (yellow card) 12' (goal) 23'; Solomatin (yellow card) 30'; Kusov (yellow card) 73'; Kirichenko (yellow card) 74'; Shershun (yellow card) 76'; Yevsikov (yellow card) 90' | Stadium: Petrovsky Stadium; Referee: Aleksandr Gvardis |

| 11 July 2003 16 | CSKA Moscow | 2 – 2 | Zenit St.Petersburg | Moscow |
| 18:00 MSK (DST) (UTC+4) | Rahimić (yellow card) 16'; Popov 32'; Gogniyev (yellow card) 63'; Solomatin (yellow card) 72'; Geynrikh 79' | Report | Kerzhakov 12'; Lobov (yellow card) 31'; Makarov (yellow card) 54'; Arshavin (yellow card) 55' (yellow-red card) 73'; Nedorezov (yellow card) 61'; Spivak 70'; Radimov (yellow card) 78' | Stadium: Dynamo Stadium; Referee: A.Evstigneev |

| 15 July 2003 24 | Lokomotiv Moscow | 1 – 3 | CSKA Moscow | Moscow |
| 19:00 MSK (DST) (UTC+4) | Ovchinnikov (yellow card) 66'; Ashvetia 75'; Pashinin (yellow card) 86' | Report | Yanovsky 19'; Popov 24'; Gusev 63' (pen.); Jarošík (yellow card) 65'; Solomatin (yellow card) 79' | Stadium: Lokomotiv Stadium; Referee: Valentin Ivanov |

| 19 July 2003 17 | Torpedo Moscow | 3 – 2 | CSKA Moscow | Moscow |
| 16:00 MSK (DST) (UTC+4) | Rawneyka 7'; Leonchenko 41', 49' (pen.) (yellow card) 51'; Semshov (yellow card) 46'; Zyryanov (yellow card) 67' | Report | Gusev 17' (pen.); Yanovsky 31'; Kirichenko (yellow card) 58'; Šemberas (yellow card) 77' | Stadium: Luzhniki Stadium; Referee: Yu.Baskakov |

| 24 July 2003 18 | CSKA Moscow | 2 – 0 | Uralan Elista | Moscow |
| 19:00 MSK (DST) (UTC+4) | Šemberas (yellow card) 27'; Laizāns 55'; Rahimić (yellow card) 58'; Shershun (yellow card) 71'; Kirichenko 74' | Report | Vranješ (yellow card) 25'; Ajinjal (yellow card) 28' | Stadium: Dynamo Stadium; Referee: Vladimir Pettay |

| 2 August 2003 19 | Shinnik Yaroslavl | 1 – 1 | CSKA Moscow | Yaroslavl |
| 19:00 MSK (DST) (UTC+4) | Kushev 9'; Grishin (yellow card) 45' | Report | Gusev (yellow card) 22'; Olić 46'; Laizāns (yellow card) 79' | Stadium: Shinnik Stadium; Referee: Sergey Lapochkin |

| 9 August 2003 20 | CSKA Moscow | 3 – 0 | Alania Vladikavkaz | Moscow |
| 19:00 MSK (DST) (UTC+4) | Popov 54', 90'; Olić 55'; Yanovsky (yellow card) 71' | Report | Barasa (yellow card) 32' | Stadium: Dynamo Stadium; Referee: Sergei Fursa |

| 16 August 2003 21 | Torpedo-Metallurg | 2 – 1 | CSKA Moscow | Moscow |
| 16:00 MSK (DST) (UTC+4) | Monaryov 20' (yellow card) 42'; Rekhviashvili (yellow card) 52'; Biletskyi (yellow card) 58' | Report | Semak (yellow card) 14'; Gusev (yellow card) 58'; Tlisov 78'; Laizāns (yellow card) 82' | Stadium: Eduard Streltsov Stadium; Referee: Igor Zakharov |

| 24 August 2003 22 | CSKA Moscow | 3 – 0 | Krylia Sovetov | Moscow |
| 17:00 MSK (DST) (UTC+4) | Olić 33'; Semak 44'; Gusev 52' | Report | Ovie (yellow card) 45' | Stadium: Dynamo Stadium; Referee: I.Yegorov |

| 31 August 2003 23 | CSKA Moscow | 1 – 1 | Saturn Ramenskoye | Moscow |
| 18:00 MSK (DST) (UTC+4) | Šemberas (yellow card) 18' (yellow-red card) 25'; Rahimić (yellow card) 30' (yellow-red card) 38'; A.Berezutski (yellow card) 45'; Olić (yellow card) 64'; Gusev 80'; V.Berezutski (yellow card) 90' | Report | Pavlovich (red card) 25'; Amoako 33'; Jović (yellow card) 35'; Medvedev (yellow card) 60'; Bystrov (yellow card) 77'; Horshkov (yellow card) 88' | Stadium: Dynamo Stadium; Referee: Nikolai Ivanov |

| 20 September 2003 25 | CSKA Moscow | 3 – 2 | Chernomorets Novorossiysk | Moscow |
| 17:00 MSK (DST) (UTC+4) | Semak 2'; Gusev (penalty missed) 10' 72'; Olić 90' (pen.) | Report | Sosnovschi 14'; Cherkes (yellow card) 34'; Ayupov (yellow card) 37'; Tchuissé (yellow card) 88'; Teryokhin 89' (pen.) | Stadium: Dynamo Stadium; Referee: A.Tyumin |

| 27 September 2003 26 | Rostov | 0 – 1 | CSKA Moscow | Rostov-on-Don |
| 16:00 MSK (DST) (UTC+4) | Maksymov (yellow card) 47'; Rogochiy (yellow card) 64'; Aksu (yellow card) 82' | Report | Shershun (yellow card) 35'; Olić 70' | Stadium: Olimp-2; Referee: A.Gonchar |

| 4 October 2003 27 | CSKA Moscow | 1 – 1 | Dynamo Moscow | Moscow |
| 16:00 MSK (DST) (UTC+4) | Solomatin (yellow card) 4'; Olić 61' (pen.); Šemberas (yellow card) 78'; Semak (yellow card) 83'; Rahimić (yellow card) 90' | Report | Bratić (yellow card) 23'; Baltiev 40' (yellow card) 59'; Grishin (yellow card) 45'; Bulykin (yellow card) 85' | Stadium: Dynamo Stadium; Referee: Valentin Ivanov |

| 20 October 2003 28 | Spartak Moscow | 0 – 0 | CSKA Moscow | Moscow |
| 19:00 MSK (DST) (UTC+4) | Kébé (yellow card) 17'; Mitreski (yellow card) 42'; Trobok (yellow card) 76' | Report | Jarošík (yellow card) 39'; Gusev (yellow card) 55' | Stadium: Luzhniki Stadium; Referee: Yu.Chebotarev |

| 25 October 2003 29 | CSKA Moscow | 3 – 0 | Rotor Volgograd | Moscow |
| 16:00 MSK (DST) (UTC+4) | Olić 26'; Popov 32'; Gusev 35' | Report | | Stadium: Dynamo Stadium; Referee: A.Gonchar |

| 1 November 2003 30 | Rubin Kazan | 3 – 2 | CSKA Moscow | Kazan |
| 16:00 MSK (UTC+3) | Čížek (yellow card) 64'; Rôni 73' (pen.); Boyarintsev 88'; Yevsikov 90' (o.g.) | Report | Scotti 36' (o.g.); Mandrykin (yellow card) 72'; Kirichenko 78'; Shershun (yellow card) 88' | Stadium: Central Stadium; Referee: Yu.Chebotarev |

==== Table ====
| Pos | Team | Pld | W | D | L | GF | GA | GD | Pts | Qualification or relegation |
|---|---|---|---|---|---|---|---|---|---|---|
| 1 | CSKA Moscow (C) | 30 | 17 | 8 | 5 | 56 | 32 | +24 | 59 | Qualification to Champions League second qualifying round |
| 2 | Zenit St. Petersburg | 30 | 16 | 8 | 6 | 48 | 32 | +16 | 56 | Qualification to UEFA Cup second qualifying round |
| 3 | Rubin Kazan | 30 | 15 | 8 | 7 | 44 | 29 | +15 | 53 | Qualification to UEFA Cup second qualifying round |
| 4 | Lokomotiv Moscow | 30 | 15 | 7 | 8 | 54 | 33 | +21 | 52 | |
| 5 | Shinnik Yaroslavl | 30 | 12 | 11 | 7 | 43 | 34 | +9 | 47 | Qualification to Intertoto Cup second round |

Source: RFPL
Rules for classification: 1st points; 2nd matches won; 3rd head-to-head (points, matches won, goal difference, goals scored, away goals scored); 4th goal difference
(C) Champions

=== Russian Cup ===
==== 2003–2004 ====
| 14 October 2003 Last 32 1st leg | Yelets | 1 – 0 | CSKA Moscow | Yelets |
| 15:00 MSK (UTC+4) | Ovsyannikov 23'; Chernyh (yellow card) 32' | Report | Yanovsky (yellow card) 23' | Stadium: Trud Stadium; Referee: A.Gvardis |

| 5 November 2003 Last 32 2nd leg | CSKA Moscow | 3 – 1 (3 – 2 agg.) | Yelets | Moscow |
| 18:00 MSK (UTC+3) | Gusev 30'; Kirichenko 83'; Jarošík 90' | Report | Chernyh (yellow card) 32'; Kovalenko 59' | Stadium: Dynamo Stadium; Referee: Sergey Lapochkin |

| 8 November 2003 Round of 16 1st leg | CSKA Moscow | 4 – 0 | Uralan Elista | Moscow |
| 15:00 MSK (UTC+3) | Olić (penalty missed) 4' 4', 38'; Laizāns 19'; Jarošík 45' | Report | Dutov (yellow card) 6'; Burchenko (yellow card) 74' | Stadium: Dynamo Stadium; Attendance: 3,800; Referee: Sergei Fursa |

The Round of 16 2nd leg took place during the 2004 season.

=== Premier League Cup ===
| 29 March 2003 Last 16 1st leg | Zenit St.Petersburg | 2 – 0 | CSKA Moscow | Saint Petersburg |
| 16:00 MSK (UTC+4) | Radimov 16'; Nikolayev 26'; Osipov (yellow card) 70'; Šírl (yellow card) 71' | Report | Nakhushev (yellow card) 15'; Vorobyev (yellow card) 31'; Geynrikh (yellow card) 59'; Nikolayev (yellow card) 73' | Stadium: Petrovsky Stadium; Referee: V.Pettai |

| 2 April 2003 Last 16 2nd leg | CSKA Moscow | 3 – 1 (3 – 3 (a) agg.) | Zenit St.Petersburg | Moscow |
| 19:00 MSK (UTC+4) | Solomatin (yellow card) 50'; Kirichenko 72'; Samodin 81', 90' | Report | Astafyev (yellow card) 26' (yellow-red card) 64'; Osipov (penalty missed) 35'; Vasilyev (yellow card) 39'; Radimov 53' (pen.) | Stadium: Dynamo Stadium; Referee: A.Gonchar |

=== UEFA Champions League ===
==== Qualifying rounds ====
| 30 July 2003 Second qualifying round 1st leg | CSKA Moscow (Russia) | 1 – 2 | (North Macedonia) Vardar | Moscow, Russia |
| 20:00 MSK (UTC+4) | Kusov (yellow card) 60'; Kirichenko 89' | Report | Zaharievski (yellow card) 52'; Grozdanoski 54'; Wandeir 64' | Stadium: Dynamo Stadium; Referee: Stefano Farina (Italy) |

| 6 August 2003 Second qualifying round 2nd Leg | Vardar (North Macedonia) | 1 – 1 (3 – 2 agg.) | (Russia) CSKA Moscow | Skopje, Macedonia |
| 20:00 MSK (UTC+4) | Wandeir 65'; Zekir (yellow card) 90' | Report | Gogniyev 28'; Yevsikov (yellow card) 90' | Stadium: Philip II Arena; Referee: Victor José Esquinas Torres (Spain) |

== Squad statistics ==
As of match played 8 November 2003

=== Appearances and goals ===
| No. | Pos | Nat | Player | Total | | Premier League | | 2003–04 Russian Cup | | Super Cup | | Premier League Cup | | UEFA Champions League | |
| No. | Pos | Nat | Player | Apps | Goals | Apps | Goals | Apps | Goals | Apps | Goals | Apps | Goals | Apps | Goals |
|---|---|---|---|---|---|---|---|---|---|---|---|---|---|---|---|
| 1 | GK | (Russia) RUS | Veniamin Mandrykin | 23 | 0 | 19 | 0 | 1 | 0 | 1 | 0 | 1 | 0 | 1 | 0 |
| 2 | DF | (Lithuania) LTU | Deividas Šemberas | 26 | 0 | 19+2 | 0 | 3 | 0 | 0+1 | 0 | 0 | 0 | 1 | 0 |
| 3 | DF | (Russia) RUS | Andrei Solomatin | 25 | 0 | 10+10 | 0 | 2+1 | 0 | 0+1 | 0 | 1 | 0 | 0 | 0 |
| 5 | MF | (Russia) RUS | Sergei Semak | 24 | 7 | 24 | 7 | 0 | 0 | 0 | 0 | 0 | 0 | 0 | 0 |
| 6 | DF | (Russia) RUS | Aleksei Berezutski | 34 | 0 | 30 | 0 | 2 | 0 | 1 | 0 | 0 | 0 | 1 | 0 |
| 7 | MF | (Russia) RUS | Igor Yanovsky | 32 | 5 | 21+4 | 5 | 2+1 | 0 | 1 | 0 | 1 | 0 | 2 | 0 |
| 8 | MF | (Russia) RUS | Rolan Gusev | 31 | 10 | 24+2 | 9 | 2 | 1 | 1 | 0 | 0 | 0 | 2 | 0 |
| 9 | FW | (Croatia) CRO | Ivica Olić | 12 | 9 | 10 | 7 | 2 | 2 | 0 | 0 | 0 | 0 | 0 | 0 |
| 11 | FW | (Russia) RUS | Spartak Gogniyev | 16 | 3 | 8+3 | 2 | 2 | 0 | 0 | 0 | 1 | 0 | 2 | 1 |
| 13 | FW | (Russia) RUS | Sergey Samodin | 8 | 2 | 0+2 | 0 | 0+1 | 0 | 0+1 | 0 | 1+1 | 2 | 0+2 | 0 |
| 14 | FW | (Russia) RUS | Dmitri Kirichenko | 31 | 8 | 6+17 | 5 | 1+2 | 1 | 0+1 | 0 | 2 | 1 | 0+2 | 1 |
| 17 | DF | (Russia) RUS | Ruslan Nakhushev | 2 | 0 | 0 | 0 | 0 | 0 | 0 | 0 | 1+1 | 0 | 0 | 0 |
| 18 | MF | (Russia) RUS | Aleksandr Berketov | 2 | 0 | 0 | 0 | 0 | 0 | 0 | 0 | 2 | 0 | 0 | 0 |
| 19 | MF | (Latvia) LAT | Juris Laizāns | 27 | 2 | 8+13 | 1 | 2+1 | 1 | 1 | 0 | 0 | 0 | 1+1 | 0 |
| 20 | MF | (Czech Republic) CZE | Jiří Jarošík | 32 | 10 | 26 | 7 | 2+1 | 2 | 1 | 1 | 0 | 0 | 2 | 0 |
| 21 | FW | (Russia) RUS | Denis Popov | 28 | 8 | 18+4 | 8 | 3 | 0 | 1 | 0 | 0 | 0 | 2 | 0 |
| 23 | DF | (Russia) RUS | Denis Yevsikov | 30 | 0 | 15+9 | 0 | 2 | 0 | 1 | 0 | 1 | 0 | 2 | 0 |
| 24 | DF | (Russia) RUS | Vasili Berezutski | 26 | 0 | 23 | 0 | 0 | 0 | 1 | 0 | 1 | 0 | 1 | 0 |
| 25 | MF | (Bosnia and Herzegovina) BIH | Elvir Rahimić | 34 | 1 | 27+1 | 1 | 2 | 0 | 1 | 0 | 1 | 0 | 2 | 0 |
| 26 | FW | (Uzbekistan) UZB | Alexander Geynrikh | 5 | 1 | 0+2 | 1 | 0+1 | 0 | 0+1 | 0 | 1 | 0 | 0 | 0 |
| 28 | DF | (Ukraine) UKR | Bohdan Shershun | 31 | 1 | 27 | 1 | 2 | 0 | 0 | 0 | 0 | 0 | 2 | 0 |
| 29 | MF | (Russia) RUS | Artur Tlisov | 5 | 1 | 1+2 | 1 | 1 | 0 | 0 | 0 | 1 | 0 | 0 | 0 |
| 30 | GK | (Azerbaijan) AZE | Dmitry Kramarenko | 1 | 0 | 0 | 0 | 0 | 0 | 0 | 0 | 1 | 0 | 0 | 0 |
| 35 | GK | (Russia) RUS | Igor Akinfeev | 18 | 0 | 11+2 | 0 | 2 | 0 | 0 | 0 | 0+2 | 0 | 1 | 0 |
| 36 | MF | (Russia) RUS | Aleksei Nikolayev | 1 | 0 | 0 | 0 | 0 | 0 | 0 | 0 | 1 | 0 | 0 | 0 |
| 37 | DF | (Russia) RUS | Oleg Malyukov | 1 | 0 | 0 | 0 | 0 | 0 | 0 | 0 | 0+1 | 0 | 0 | 0 |
| 39 | DF | (Russia) RUS | Ivan Taranov | 2 | 0 | 0 | 0 | 0 | 0 | 0 | 0 | 2 | 0 | 0 | 0 |
| 41 | MF | (Russia) RUS | Nikolay Vorobyev | 1 | 0 | 0 | 0 | 0 | 0 | 0 | 0 | 1 | 0 | 0 | 0 |
| 47 | FW | (Russia) RUS | Vardan Mazalov | 1 | 0 | 0+1 | 0 | 0 | 0 | 0 | 0 | 0 | 0 | 0 | 0 |
| 49 | DF | (Russia) RUS | Sergei Grichenkov | 1 | 0 | 0 | 0 | 0 | 0 | 0 | 0 | 0+1 | 0 | 0 | 0 |
| 58 | MF | (Russia) RUS | Anton Pushkarev | 1 | 0 | 0 | 0 | 0 | 0 | 0 | 0 | 0+1 | 0 | 0 | 0 |
| 59 | FW | (Russia) RUS | Innokenty Baranov | 1 | 0 | 0 | 0 | 0 | 0 | 0 | 0 | 0+1 | 0 | 0 | 0 |
| 60 | DF | (Russia) RUS | Yevgeni Klimov | 1 | 0 | 0 | 0 | 0 | 0 | 0 | 0 | 1 | 0 | 0 | 0 |
Players out on loan:
| 27 | MF | (Russia) RUS | Alan Kusov | 14 | 0 | 3+8 | 0 | 0 | 0 | 1 | 0 | 1 | 0 | 0+1 | 0 |
Players who left CSKA Moscow during the season:

=== Goal scorers ===
| Place | Position | Nation | Number | Name | Premier League | 2003–04 Russian Cup | Super Cup | Premier League Cup | UEFA Champions League | Total |
|---|---|---|---|---|---|---|---|---|---|---|
| 1 | MF | (Russia) | 8 | Rolan Gusev | 9 | 1 | 0 | 0 | 0 | 10 |
| 1 | MF | (Czech Republic) | 20 | Jiří Jarošík | 7 | 2 | 1 | 0 | 0 | 10 |
| 3 | FW | (Croatia) | 9 | Ivica Olić | 7 | 2 | 0 | 0 | 0 | 9 |
| 4 | FW | (Russia) | 21 | Denis Popov | 8 | 0 | 0 | 0 | 0 | 8 |
| 5 | MF | (Russia) | 5 | Sergei Semak | 7 | 0 | 0 | 0 | 0 | 7 |
| 5 | FW | (Russia) | 14 | Dmitri Kirichenko | 5 | 1 | 0 | 1 | 1 | 7 |
| 7 | MF | (Russia) | 7 | Igor Yanovsky | 5 | 0 | 0 | 0 | 0 | 5 |
| 8 | FW | (Russia) | 11 | Spartak Gogniyev | 2 | 0 | 0 | 0 | 1 | 3 |
| 9 | MF | (Latvia) | 19 | Juris Laizāns | 1 | 1 | 0 | 0 | 0 | 2 |
| 9 | FW | (Russia) | 13 | Sergey Samodin | 0 | 0 | 0 | 2 | 0 | 2 |
| 11 | FW | (Uzbekistan) | 26 | Alexander Geynrikh | 1 | 0 | 0 | 0 | 0 | 1 |
| 11 | MF | (Bosnia and Herzegovina) | 25 | Elvir Rahimić | 1 | 0 | 0 | 0 | 0 | 1 |
| 11 | MF | (Russia) | 29 | Artur Tlisov | 1 | 0 | 0 | 0 | 0 | 1 |
| 11 | DF | (Ukraine) | 28 | Bohdan Shershun | 1 | 0 | 0 | 0 | 0 | 1 |
| 11 | | | | Own goal | 1 | 0 | 0 | 0 | 0 | 1 |
| | | | | TOTALS | 56 | 7 | 1 | 2 | 3 | 69 |

=== Disciplinary record ===
| Number | Nation | Position | Name | Premier League | | 2003–04 Russian Cup | | Super Cup | | Premier League Cup | | UEFA Champions League | | Total | |
| Number | Nation | Position | Name | Booked | Sent off (straight red) | Booked | Sent off (straight red) | Booked | Sent off (straight red) | Booked | Sent off (straight red) | Booked | Sent off (straight red) | Booked | Sent off (straight red) |
| 1 | (Russia) | GK | Veniamin Mandrykin | 4 | 0 | 0 | 0 | 0 | 0 | 0 | 0 | 0 | 0 | 4 | 0 |
| 2 | (Lithuania) | DF | Deividas Šemberas | 7 | 1 | 0 | 0 | 0 | 0 | 0 | 0 | 0 | 0 | 7 | 1 |
| 3 | (Russia) | DF | Andrei Solomatin | 5 | 0 | 0 | 0 | 1 | 0 | 1 | 0 | 0 | 0 | 7 | 0 |
| 5 | (Russia) | MF | Sergei Semak | 4 | 0 | 0 | 0 | 0 | 0 | 0 | 0 | 0 | 0 | 4 | 0 |
| 6 | (Russia) | DF | Aleksei Berezutski | 3 | 0 | 0 | 0 | 0 | 0 | 0 | 0 | 0 | 0 | 3 | 0 |
| 7 | (Russia) | MF | Igor Yanovsky | 6 | 0 | 1 | 0 | 1 | 0 | 0 | 0 | 0 | 0 | 8 | 0 |
| 8 | (Russia) | MF | Rolan Gusev | 7 | 0 | 0 | 0 | 0 | 0 | 0 | 0 | 0 | 0 | 7 | 0 |
| 9 | (Croatia) | FW | Ivica Olić | 1 | 0 | 0 | 0 | 0 | 0 | 0 | 0 | 0 | 0 | 1 | 0 |
| 11 | (Russia) | FW | Spartak Gogniyev | 4 | 1 | 0 | 0 | 0 | 0 | 0 | 0 | 0 | 0 | 4 | 1 |
| 14 | (Russia) | FW | Dmitri Kirichenko | 5 | 0 | 0 | 0 | 0 | 0 | 0 | 0 | 0 | 0 | 5 | 0 |
| 17 | (Russia) | DF | Ruslan Nakhushev | 0 | 0 | 0 | 0 | 0 | 0 | 1 | 0 | 0 | 0 | 1 | 0 |
| 19 | (Latvia) | MF | Juris Laizāns | 5 | 0 | 0 | 0 | 0 | 0 | 0 | 0 | 0 | 0 | 5 | 0 |
| 20 | (Czech Republic) | MF | Jiří Jarošík | 3 | 0 | 0 | 0 | 0 | 0 | 0 | 0 | 0 | 0 | 3 | 0 |
| 21 | (Russia) | FW | Denis Popov | 3 | 0 | 0 | 0 | 0 | 0 | 0 | 0 | 0 | 0 | 3 | 0 |
| 23 | (Russia) | DF | Denis Yevsikov | 1 | 0 | 0 | 0 | 0 | 0 | 0 | 0 | 1 | 0 | 2 | 0 |
| 24 | (Russia) | DF | Vasili Berezutski | 3 | 0 | 0 | 0 | 1 | 0 | 0 | 0 | 0 | 0 | 4 | 0 |
| 25 | (Bosnia and Herzegovina) | MF | Elvir Rahimić | 10 | 1 | 0 | 0 | 1 | 0 | 0 | 0 | 0 | 0 | 11 | 1 |
| 26 | (Uzbekistan) | FW | Alexander Geynrikh | 0 | 0 | 0 | 0 | 1 | 0 | 1 | 0 | 0 | 0 | 2 | 0 |
| 28 | (Ukraine) | DF | Bohdan Shershun | 5 | 0 | 0 | 0 | 0 | 0 | 0 | 0 | 0 | 0 | 5 | 0 |
| 29 | (Russia) | MF | Artur Tlisov | 1 | 0 | 0 | 0 | 0 | 0 | 0 | 0 | 0 | 0 | 1 | 0 |
| 36 | (Russia) | MF | Aleksei Nikolayev | 0 | 0 | 0 | 0 | 0 | 0 | 1 | 0 | 0 | 0 | 1 | 0 |
| 41 | (Russia) | MF | Nikolay Vorobyev | 0 | 0 | 0 | 0 | 0 | 0 | 1 | 0 | 0 | 0 | 1 | 0 |
Players out on loan :
| 27 | (Russia) | MF | Alan Kusov | 7 | 1 | 0 | 0 | 1 | 0 | 0 | 0 | 1 | 0 | 9 | 1 |
Players who left CSKA Moscow during the season:
| | | | TOTALS | 84 | 4 | 1 | 0 | 6 | 0 | 5 | 0 | 2 | 0 | 98 | 4 |
