= 2004 PFC CSKA Moscow season =

CSKA
2003 season
- Manager: Artur Jorge (until June); Valery Gazzaev (from July)
- Stadium: Dynamo Stadium; Eduard Streltsov Stadium
- Premier League: 2nd
- Russian Cup: Quarter-final (vs. Krylia Sovetov)
- Russian Cup: Progressed to 2005 season
- Super Cup: Champions
- UEFA Champions League: Progressed to the UEFA Cup in the 2005 season
- Top goalscorer: League: Three Players (9); All: Vágner Love (13)
Home colours	Away colours

The 2004 Russian football season, saw CSKA Moscow competed in the Russian Premier League, Russian Cup and the UEFA Champions League.

== Season events ==
At the end of the previous season, Artur Jorge was announced as CSKA's new manager for the 2004 season.

== Squad ==
As of match played 7 December 2004

Number	Name	Nationality	Position	Date of birth (age)	Signed from	Signed in	Contract ends	Apps.	Goals
Goalkeepers
1	Veniamin Mandrykin	(Russia)	GK	30 August 1981 (aged 23)	Alania Vladikavkaz	2002		62	0
35	Igor Akinfeev	(Russia)	GK	8 April 1986 (aged 18)	Academy	2003		56	0
51	Sergei Zhideyev	(Russia)	GK	2 April 1987 (aged 17)	Trudovyye Rezervy Moscow	2004		0	0
77	Vladimir Gabulov	(Russia)	GK	19 October 1983 (aged 21)	Alania Vladikavkaz	2004		0	0
Defenders
2	Deividas Šemberas	(Lithuania)	DF	2 August 1978 (aged 26)	Dynamo Moscow	2002		97	0
4	Sergei Ignashevich	(Russia)	DF	14 July 1979 (aged 25)	Lokomotiv Moscow	2004		32	1
6	Aleksei Berezutski	(Russia)	DF	20 June 1982 (aged 22)	Chernomorets Novorossiysk	2001		92	0
15	Chidi Odiah	(Nigeria)	DF	17 December 1983 (aged 20)	Sheriff Tiraspol	2004		29	0
24	Vasili Berezutski	(Russia)	DF	20 June 1982 (aged 22)	Torpedo-ZIL	2002		40	0
28	Bohdan Shershun	(Ukraine)	DF	14 May 1981 (aged 23)	Dnipro Dnipropetrovsk	2002		75	2
39	Ivan Taranov	(Russia)	DF	22 June 1986 (aged 18)	Chernomorets Novorossiysk	2002		2	0
44	Yevgeni Klimov	(Russia)	DF	21 January 1985 (aged 19)	Academy	2002		1	0
45	Vitaliy Denisov	(Uzbekistan)	DF	23 February 1987 (aged 17)	Sportakademklub Moscow	2003		1	0
46	Renat Yanbayev	(Russia)	DF	7 April 1984 (aged 20)	Academy	2001		0	0
49	Sergei Grichenkov	(Russia)	DF	8 July 1986 (aged 18)	Academy	2002		1	0
55	Oleg Malyukov	(Russia)	DF	16 January 1985 (aged 19)	Academy	2001		1	0
57	Sergei Gorelov	(Russia)	DF	29 April 1985 (aged 19)	Academy	2003		0	0
75	Serhiy Bronnikov	(Ukraine)	DF	30 May 1986 (aged 18)	Berkut Kalachinsk	2004		0	0
Midfielders
5	Sergei Semak	(Russia)	MF	27 February 1976 (aged 28)	Asmaral Moscow	1994		329	84
7	Daniel Carvalho	(Brazil)	MF	1 March 1983 (aged 21)	Internacional	2004		18	2
8	Rolan Gusev	(Russia)	MF	17 September 1977 (aged 27)	Dynamo Moscow	2002		106	31
10	Osmar Ferreyra	(Argentina)	MF	9 January 1983 (aged 21)	River Plate	2004		18	2
17	Miloš Krasić	(Serbia and Montenegro)	MF	1 November 1984 (aged 20)	Vojvodina	2004		12	0
18	Yuri Zhirkov	(Russia)	MF	20 August 1983 (aged 21)	Spartak Tambov	2004		38	6
19	Juris Laizāns	(Latvia)	MF	6 January 1979 (aged 26)	Skonto Riga	2001		96	4
20	Jiří Jarošík	(Czech Republic)	MF	27 October 1977 (aged 27)	Sparta Prague	2003		74	16
22	Evgeni Aldonin	(Russia)	MF	22 January 1980 (aged 24)	Rotor Volgograd	2004		42	0
25	Elvir Rahimić	(Bosnia and Herzegovina)	MF	4 April 1976 (aged 28)	Anzhi Makhachkala	2001		124	2
36	Aleksei Nikolayev	(Russia)	MF	12 January 1985 (aged 19)	Academy	2003		1	0
37	Kirill Kochubei	(Russia)	MF	6 October 1986 (aged 18)	Chernomorets Novorossiysk	2004		0	0
52	Pavlo Stepanets	(Ukraine)	MF	26 May 1987 (aged 17)	RVUFK Kyiv	2004		0	0
Forwards
9	Ivica Olić	(Croatia)	FW	14 September 1979 (aged 25)	Dinamo Zagreb	2003		46	19
11	Vágner Love	(Brazil)	FW	11 June 1984 (aged 20)	Palmeiras	2004		21	13
13	Sergey Samodin	(Russia)	FW	14 February 1985 (aged 19)	Krasnodar-2000	2002		8	2
14	Dmitri Kirichenko	(Russia)	FW	17 January 1977 (aged 27)	Rostselmash	2002		93	34
23	Sergiu Dadu	(Moldova)	FW	23 January 1981 (aged 23)	Sheriff Tiraspol	2004		4	0
26	Alexander Geynrikh	(Uzbekistan)	FW	6 October 1984 (aged 20)	Pakhtakor Tashkent	2003		5	1
38	Sergei Pravosud	(Russia)	FW	18 February 1986 (aged 18)	Academy	2004		0	0
Away on loan
17	Ruslan Nakhushev	(Russia)	DF	5 September 1984 (aged 20)	Spartak Nalchik	2002		2	0
47	Vardan Mazalov	(Russia)	FW	14 October 1983 (aged 21)	Vityaz Podolsk	2003		1	0
Players who left during the season
11	Spartak Gogniyev	(Russia)	FW	19 January 1981 (aged 23)	Dynamo Moscow	2001		53	9
21	Denis Popov	(Russia)	FW	4 February 1979 (aged 25)	Chernomorets Novorossiysk	2001		82	21
29	Artur Tlisov	(Russia)	MF	10 June 1982 (aged 22)	Chernomorets Novorossiysk	2002		9	1
40	Denis Trunkin	(Russia)	GK	1 January 1985 (aged 19)	Academy	2003		0	0

=== Out on loan ===
Note: Flags indicate national team as defined under FIFA eligibility rules; some limited exceptions apply. Players may hold more than one non-FIFA nationality.

No.	Pos.	Nation	Player
17	DF	RUS	Ruslan Nakhushev (at Anzhi Makhachkala)
47	FW	RUS	Vardan Mazalov (at Khimki)

== Transfers ==
=== Winter ===
In: Note: Flags indicate national team as defined under FIFA eligibility rules; some limited exceptions apply. Players may hold more than one non-FIFA nationality.

No.	Pos.	Nation	Player
4	DF	RUS	Sergei Ignashevich (from (Russia) Lokomotiv Moscow)
7	FW	BRA	Daniel Carvalho (from (Brazil) Internacional)
10	MF	ARG	Osmar Ferreyra (from (Argentina) River Plate)
15	DF	NGR	Chidi Odiah (from (Moldova) Sheriff Tiraspol)
18	MF	RUS	Yuri Zhirkov (from (Russia) Spartak Tambov)
22	MF	RUS	Evgeni Aldonin (from (Russia) Rotor Volgograd)
46	MF	RUS	Renat Yanbayev (loan return from (Russia) Anzhi Makhachkala)
51	GK	RUS	Sergei Zhideyev (from (Russia) Trudovyye Rezervy Moscow)
75	DF	RUS	Serhiy Bronnikov (from (Russia) Berkut Kalachinsk)
77	GK	RUS	Vladimir Gabulov (from (Russia) Alania Vladikavkaz)

Out: Note: Flags indicate national team as defined under FIFA eligibility rules; some limited exceptions apply. Players may hold more than one non-FIFA nationality.

No.	Pos.	Nation	Player
3	DF	RUS	Andrei Solomatin (to (Russia) Kuban Krasnodar)
7	MF	RUS	Igor Yanovskiy (to (Russia) Alania Vladikavkaz)
18	MF	RUS	Aleksandr Berketov
23	DF	RUS	Denis Yevsikov (to (Russia) Lokomotiv Moscow)
30	GK	AZE	Dmitriy Kramarenko (to (Russia) Baltika Kaliningrad)
43	MF	RUS	Andrei Trofimov (to (Russia) Neftekhimik Nizhnekamsk)
45	FW	RUS	Andrei Kireyev (to (Russia) Nosta Novotroitsk)
47	FW	RUS	Vardan Mazalov (loan to (Russia) Anzhi Makhachkala)

=== Summer ===
In: Note: Flags indicate national team as defined under FIFA eligibility rules; some limited exceptions apply. Players may hold more than one non-FIFA nationality.

No.	Pos.	Nation	Player
11	FW	BRA	Vágner Love (from (Brazil) Palmeiras)
17	MF	SCG	Miloš Krasić (from (Serbia and Montenegro) Vojvodina)
23	FW	MDA	Sergiu Dadu (from (Moldova) Sheriff Tiraspol, previously on loan to (Russia) Alania Vladikavkaz)

Out: Note: Flags indicate national team as defined under FIFA eligibility rules; some limited exceptions apply. Players may hold more than one non-FIFA nationality.

No.	Pos.	Nation	Player
11	FW	RUS	Spartak Gogniyev (to (Russia) Rotor Volgograd)
17	MF	RUS	Ruslan Nakhushev (loan to (Russia) Anzhi Makhachkala)
21	FW	RUS	Denis Popov (to (Russia) Kuban Krasnodar)
29	MF	RUS	Artur Tlisov (to (Russia) Kuban Krasnodar)
40	GK	RUS	Denis Trunkin (to (Russia) Nosta Novotroitsk)
47	FW	RUS	Vardan Mazalov (loan to (Russia) FC Khimki, previously on loan to (Russia) Anzhi Makhachkala)

== Competitions ==
=== Super Cup ===
7 March 2004	Spartak Moscow	1 – 3 (a.e.t.)	CSKA Moscow	Moscow
16:00 MSK (UTC+3)	Kalynychenko 14'; Petković (yellow card) 43'; Samedov (yellow card) 56'	Report	Ignashevich (yellow card) 33'; Semak 40'; Olić (yellow card) 52'; Zhirkov (yellow card) 75'; Carvalho 111'; Kirichenko 113'	Stadium: Lokomotiv Stadium; Attendance: 18,000; Referee: Igor Egorov

=== Premier League ===
==== Results by round ====
Round	1	2	3	4	5	6	7	8	9	10	11	12	13	14	15	16	17	18	19	20	21	22	23	24	25	26	27	28	29	30
Ground	H	A	A	H	A	H	A	H	A	H	A	H	A	H	A	H	A	H	A	H	A	H	A	H	A	H	A	H	H	A
Result	D	D	D	D	W	W	L	W	W	W	W	D	D	D	L	W	W	W	L	W	W	W	W	L	W	W	W	D	D	W

Updated to match(es) played on 12 November 2004. Source: See Results
A = Away; H = Home; W = Win; D = Draw; L = Loss

==== Results ====
12 March 2004 1	CSKA Moscow	0 – 0	Moscow	Moscow
19:00 MSK (UTC+3)		Report	Yaskovich (yellow card) 90'	Stadium: Dynamo Stadium; Attendance: 10,000; Referee: Aleksandr Kolobaev

20 March 2004 2	Dynamo Moscow	1 – 1	CSKA Moscow	Moscow
16:00 MSK (UTC+3)	Batak 8'	Report	Ignashevich (red card) 52'; Kirichenko 57'; Šemberas (yellow card) 65'	Stadium: Dynamo Stadium; Referee: Valentin Ivanov

27 March 2004 3	Krylia Sovetov	1 – 1	CSKA Moscow	Samara
15:00 MSK (UTC+4)	Catanha (yellow card) 23'; Kowba 85'	Report	Gusev 23'; Jarošík (yellow card) 83'; Akinfeev (red card) 86'	Stadium: Metallurg Stadium; Referee: Sergey Lapochkin

3 April 2004 4	CSKA Moscow	3 – 3	Zenit St.Petersburg	Moscow
16:00 MSK (UTC+4)	Kirichenko 6' (yellow card) 20'; Zhirkov 39'; Rahimić 56'; Mandrykin (yellow card) 59'; Shershun (yellow card) 67' (yellow-red card) 71'; V.Berezutski (yellow card) 83'	Report	Radimov 41' (yellow card) 45'; Kerzhakov 64'; Spivak 90'	Stadium: Dynamo Stadium; Referee: V.Vlasov

7 April 2004 5	Rostov	1 – 3	CSKA Moscow	Rostov-on-Don
18:00 MSK (UTC+4)	Coyle (yellow card) 17'; Rogochiy (yellow card) 45'; Kruščić (yellow card) 51'; Adamov 71'	Report	Zhirkov 38' (yellow card) 59'; Rahimić (yellow card) 63'; Kirichenko 67'; Ignashevich 90'	Stadium: Olimp-2; Referee: Sergei Fursa

10 April 2004 6	CSKA Moscow	3 – 1	Kuban Krasnodar	Moscow
18:00 MSK (UTC+4)	Kirichenko 8'; Gusev 17'; Odiah (yellow card) 28'; Semak (yellow card) 30' (goal) 73'; Ferreyra (yellow card) 87'	Report	Dyomin (yellow card) 22'; Solomatin (yellow card) 66'; Kantonistov 84'	Stadium: Dynamo Stadium; Referee: A.Evstigneev

17 April 2004 7	Lokomotiv Moscow	1 – 0	CSKA Moscow	Moscow
16:00 MSK (UTC+4)	Khokhlov 55'; Evseev (yellow card) 75'	Report		Stadium: Lokomotiv Stadium; Referee: Nikolai Ivanov

24 April 2004 8	CSKA Moscow	1 – 0	Alania Vladikavkaz	Moscow
18:00 MSK (UTC+4)	Odiah (yellow card) 14'; Rahimić (yellow card) 32'; Kirichenko 59'	Report	Agayev (yellow card) 5'; Tudor (yellow card) 45'; Sarkisyan (yellow card) 60'	Stadium: Dynamo Stadium; Referee: A.Tyumin

1 May 2004 9	Rotor Volgograd	1 – 3	CSKA Moscow	Volgograd
18:00 MSK (UTC+4)	Radkevich 28' (yellow card) 39'; Yesipov (yellow card) 61'; Mogilevskiy (yellow card) 79'	Report	Jarošík (yellow card) 21'; Olić 45', 59' (pen.), 76'	Stadium: Central Profsoyuz Stadium; Referee: A.Gonchar

9 May 2004 10	CSKA Moscow	2 – 0	Saturn Ramenskoye	Moscow
18:00 MSK (UTC+4)	Zhirkov 27'; Šemberas (yellow card) 49'; Semak 72'	Report	Bystrov (yellow card) 61'; Díaz (yellow card) 64'	Stadium: Dynamo Stadium; Referee: Vladimir Pettay

15 May 2004 11	Spartak Moscow	0 – 2	CSKA Moscow	Moscow
16:00 MSK (UTC+4)	Tamaș (yellow card) 18'; Pogrebnyak (yellow card) 58'; Sosa (yellow card) 58'; Șoavă (yellow card) 63'; Samedov (yellow card) 65'	Report	Zoa 8' (o.g.); Olić (yellow card) 30' (goal) 77'; A.Berezutski (yellow card) 62'	Stadium: Dynamo Stadium; Referee: S.Timofeev

19 May 2004 12	CSKA Moscow	1 – 1	Shinnik Yaroslavl	Moscow
18:30 MSK (UTC+4)	Gusev (yellow card) 62'; Semak 70'; Carvalho (yellow card) 86'	Report	Grishin (yellow card) 42'; Khazov (yellow card) 65'; Kulchy (yellow card) 86'; Karpenko 89' (pen.)	Stadium: Dynamo Stadium; Referee: Yuri Klyuchnikov

22 May 2004 13	Amkar Perm	0 – 0	CSKA Moscow	Perm
17:00 MSK (UTC+4)	Povorov (yellow card) 88'	Report	Odiah (yellow card) 12'	Stadium: Zvezda Stadium; Referee: A.Evstigneev

3 June 2004 14	CSKA Moscow	3 – 3	Torpedo Moscow	Moscow
16:00 MSK (UTC+4)	Jarošík 33'; Olić 54'; Kirichenko 86'; Aldonin (yellow card) 90'	Report	Lebedenko 67', 68'; Semshov 70'	Stadium: Dynamo Stadium; Referee: Yu.Baskakov

7 July 2004 15	Rubin Kazan	2 – 1	CSKA Moscow	Kazan
18:00 MSK (UTC+4)	Rôni (yellow card) 55' (goal) 58', 84' (pen.); Sinyov (yellow card) 65'; Kozko (yellow card) 73'	Report	Semak (yellow card) 43'; Jarošík 52'; Rahimić (yellow card) 78'; Mandrykin (red card) 83'	Stadium: Central Stadium; Referee: S.Timofeev

11 July 2004 16	CSKA Moscow	3 – 0	Amkar Perm	Moscow
18:00 MSK (UTC+4)	Zhirkov 36', 62'; Jarošík 65'; Ferreyra (yellow card) 86'	Report	Povorov (yellow card) 55'	Stadium: Dynamo Stadium; Referee: A.Gonchar

17 July 2004 17	Torpedo Moscow	0 – 1	CSKA Moscow	Moscow
16:00 MSK (UTC+4)		Report	Olić 39' (penalty missed) 55'; Jarošík (yellow card) 42'	Stadium: Eduard Streltsov Stadium; Referee: Aleksandr Kolobaev

23 July 2004 18	CSKA Moscow	1 – 0	Rubin Kazan	Moscow
19:00 MSK (UTC+4)	Olić 43' (yellow card) 87'; Šemberas (yellow card) 80'	Report	Sibaya (yellow card) 72' (yellow-red card) 77'; Calisto (yellow card) 89'	Stadium: Dynamo Stadium; Referee: Stanislav Sukhina

14 August 2004 19	Shinnik Yaroslavl	2 – 1	CSKA Moscow	Yaroslavl
19:00 MSK (UTC+4)	Starostyak (yellow card) 17'; Spahić 21'; Khazov (yellow card) 30'; Rubins 32'; Radosavljević (yellow card) 48'; Łągiewka (yellow card) 88'	Report	V.Berezutski (yellow card) 17'; Kirichenko 41' (pen.); Ignashevich (yellow card) 56'; Gusev (yellow card) 66'; Odiah (yellow card) 88'	Stadium: Shinnik Stadium; Referee: Nikolai Ivanov

20 August 2004 20	CSKA Moscow	3 – 0	Rotor Volgograd	Moscow
19:00 MSK (UTC+4)	Olić 28'; Vágner Love 42', 70'	Report	Radkevich (yellow card) 14'	Stadium: Dynamo Stadium; Referee: S.Maroushko

29 August 2004 21	Saturn Ramenskoye	0 – 1	CSKA Moscow	Ramenskoye
18:00 MSK (UTC+4)	Jean (yellow card) 29'; Delgado (yellow card) 34'; Bastía (red card) 90'; Bazayev (red card) 90'	Report	Rahimić (yellow card) 24'; Jarošík (yellow card) 34'; Odiah (yellow card) 72'; Šemberas (yellow card) 86'; Kirichenko 89'; V.Berezutski (red card) 90'; Zhirkov (red card) 90'	Stadium: Saturn Stadium; Referee: A.Gonchar

10 September 2004 22	CSKA Moscow	2 – 1	Spartak Moscow	Moscow
19:00 MSK (UTC+4)	Jarošík 18' (yellow card) 90'; Gusev (yellow card) 53'; A.Berezutski (yellow card) 60'; Aldonin (yellow card) 65'; Olić 89'	Report	Kébé (yellow card) 28' (yellow-red card) 43'; Vidić 32' (yellow card) 90'; Pavlyuchenko (yellow card) 83'; Tamaș (yellow card) 90'	Stadium: Dynamo Stadium; Referee: M.Khodyrev

19 September 2004 23	Alania Vladikavkaz	1 – 4	CSKA Moscow	Vladikavkaz
15:00 MSK (UTC+4)	Tarlowski (yellow card) 31'; Zec 81'	Report	Vágner Love 15', 51' (yellow card) 70'; Gusev 32'; Ferreyra 60'	Stadium: Republican Spartak Stadium; Referee: Vladimir Pettay

25 September 2004 24	CSKA Moscow	0 – 1	Lokomotiv Moscow	Moscow
16:00 MSK (UTC+4)	Ferreyra (yellow card) 86'	Report	Evseev (yellow card) 47'; Loskov 73'	Stadium: Dynamo Stadium; Referee: Stanislav Sukhina

3 October 2004 25	Kuban Krasnodar	0 – 3	CSKA Moscow	Krasnodar
18:30 MSK (UTC+4)		Report	Ferreyra 33'; Semak 50'; Vágner Love (yellow card) 52'; Kirichenko 90'	Stadium: Kuban Stadium; Referee: Aleksandr Gvardis

16 October 2004 26	CSKA Moscow	2 – 0	Rostov	Moscow
18:00 MSK (UTC+4)	Jarošík 37'; Vágner Love 81' (pen.)	Report	Mnguni (yellow card) 25'; Datsenko (yellow card) 26'; Shirshov (yellow card) 37'	Stadium: Dynamo Stadium; Referee: A.Evstigneev

25 October 2004 27	Zenit St.Petersburg	0 – 3	CSKA Moscow	Saint Petersburg
20:00 MSK (UTC+4)	Mareš (yellow card) 35'; Šumulikoski (yellow card) 52'; Radimov (yellow card) 69'	Report	Gusev 13'; Šemberas (yellow card) 44'; Zhirkov 70' (yellow card) 76'; Vágner Love 90' (yellow card) 90'	Stadium: Petrovsky Stadium; Referee: Vladimir Pettay

30 October 2004 28	CSKA Moscow	1 – 1	Krylia Sovetov	Moscow
16:00 MSK (UTC+3)	Vágner Love 3'	Report	Dokhoyan 53'; Karyaka (yellow card) 90'	Stadium: Dynamo Stadium; Referee: Stanislav Sukhina

8 November 2004 29	CSKA Moscow	0 – 0	Dynamo Moscow	Moscow
16:00 MSK (UTC+3)		Report	Mikhaylov (yellow card) 51'	Stadium: Dynamo Stadium; Referee: S.Frantsuzov

11 November 2004 30	Moscow	1 – 4	CSKA Moscow	Moscow
18:00 MSK (UTC+3)	Adamu 10' (yellow card) 61'; Kuzmin (yellow card) 79'	Report	Semak 43'; Vágner Love 49', 67'; Carvalho 60'	Stadium: Eduard Streltsov Stadium; Attendance: 9,000; Referee: Aleksandr Gvardis

==== League table ====
Pos	Team	Pld	W	D	L	GF	GA	GD	Pts	Qualification or relegation
1	Lokomotiv Moscow (C)	30	18	7	5	44	19	+25	61	Qualification to Champions League second qualifying round
2	CSKA Moscow	30	17	9	4	53	22	+31	60	Qualification to UEFA Cup first round
3	Krylia Sovetov Samara	30	17	5	8	50	41	+9	56	Qualification to UEFA Cup second qualifying round
4	Zenit St. Petersburg	30	17	5	8	55	37	+18	56	Qualification to UEFA Cup second qualifying round
5	Torpedo Moscow	30	16	6	8	53	37	+16	54	

Source: RSSSF
Rules for classification: 1st points; 2nd matches won; 3rd head-to-head (points, matches won, goal difference, goals scored, away goals scored); 4th goal difference
(C) Champions

=== Russian Cup ===
==== 2003–2004 ====
23 March 2004 Round of 16 2nd leg	Elista	0 – 1 (0 – 5 agg.)	CSKA Moscow	Elista
16:00 MSK (UTC+3)	Ajinjal (yellow card) 69'	Report	Kirichenko 19'; A.Berezutski (yellow card) 61'; Šemberas (yellow card) 68'	Stadium: Uralan Stadium; Attendance: 6,000; Referee: S.Maroushko

14 April 2004 Quarter-final 1st leg	Krylia Sovetov	2 – 1	CSKA Moscow	Samara
19:00 MSK (UTC+4)	Koroman 8'; Karyaka 78' (pen.)	Report	Jarošík (yellow card) 38'; Olić 90+3'	Stadium: Metallurg Stadium; Attendance: 25,000; Referee: S.Timofeev

21 April 2004 Quarter-final 2nd leg	CSKA Moscow	0 – 1 (1 – 3 agg.)	Krylia Sovetov	Moscow
19:00 MSK (UTC+4)		Report	Leilton (yellow card) 36'; Vinogradov 70'	Stadium: Dynamo Stadium; Attendance: 7,000; Referee: A.Gonchar

==== 2004–2005 ====
31 July 2004 Fifth round 1st leg	Sokol Saratov	2 – 0	CSKA Moscow	Saratov
19:00 MSK (UTC+4)	Kachura 9' (yellow card) 34'; Ivanov 22'; Khlestov (yellow card) 89'	Report	Shershun (yellow card) 14' (yellow-red card) 90'; Semak (yellow card) 83'	Stadium: Lokomotiv Stadium; Attendance: 13,200

20 November 2004 Fifth round 2nd leg	CSKA Moscow	3 – 0 Awarded (3 – 2 agg.)	Sokol Saratov	Moscow
MSK (UTC+3)		Report		Stadium: Dynamo Stadium; Referee: A.Evstigneev

Round 16 took place during the 2005 season.

=== UEFA Champions League ===
==== Qualifying rounds ====
27 July 2004 Second qualifying round 1st Leg	Neftchi Baku (Azerbaijan)	0 – 0	(Russia) CSKA Moscow	Baku, Azerbaijan
18:00 MSK (UTC+4)	Tebloyev (yellow card) 7'; Sadygov (yellow card) 47'	Report	Odiah (yellow card) 67'; Laizāns (yellow card) 71'; Gusev (yellow card) 89'	Stadium: Tofiq Bahramov Republican Stadium; Attendance: 29,500; Referee: Asaf Kenan (Israel)

4 August 2004 Second qualifying round 2nd Leg	CSKA Moscow (Russia)	2 – 0 (2 – 0 agg.)	(Azerbaijan) Neftchi Baku	Moscow, Russia
20:00 MSK (UTC+4)	Gusev 68' (yellow card) 90'; Vágner Love 72'	Report	Tebloyev (yellow card) 53'	Stadium: Central Dynamo Stadium; Attendance: 10,000; Referee: Daniel Stålhammar (Sweden)

10 August 2004 Third qualifying round 1st leg	CSKA Moscow (Russia)	2 – 1	(Scotland) Rangers	Moscow, Russia
20:00 MSK (UTC+4)	Vágner Love 4'; Jarošík 46'; Šemberas (yellow card) 53'; Zhirkov (yellow card) 75'	Report	Novo 37' (yellow card) 77'; Pršo (yellow card) 53'; Khizanishvili (yellow card) 68'; Ricksen (yellow card) 72'; Rae (yellow card) 90'	Stadium: Lokomotiv Stadium; Referee: Jan Wegereef (Netherlands)

25 August 2004 Third qualifying round 2nd leg	Rangers (Scotland)	1 – 1 (2 – 3 agg.)	(Russia) CSKA Moscow	Glasgow, Scotland
23:00 MSK (UTC+4)	Novo (yellow card) 70'; Thompson 87'	Report	Vágner Love 60'; Odiah (yellow card) 68'; Semak (yellow card) 85'	Stadium: Ibrox Stadium; Referee: Wolfgang Stark (Germany)

==== Group stages ====
Pos	Team	Pld	W	D	L	GF	GA	GD	Pts	Qualification
1	(England) Chelsea	6	4	1	1	10	3	+7	13	Advance to knockout stage
2	(Portugal) Porto	6	2	2	2	4	6	−2	8	Advance to knockout stage
3	(Russia) CSKA Moscow	6	2	1	3	5	5	0	7	Transfer to UEFA Cup
4	(France) Paris Saint-Germain	6	1	2	3	3	8	−5	5	

14 September 2004 1	Porto (Portugal)	0 – 0	(Russia) CSKA Moscow	Porto, Portugal
22:45 MSK (UTC+4)	Costa (yellow card) 78'	Report	Odiah (yellow card) 43'; Zhirkov (yellow card) 68'; Akinfeev (yellow card) 88'	Stadium: Estádio do Dragão; Attendance: 39,309; Referee: Kim Milton Nielsen (Denmark)

29 September 2004 2	CSKA Moscow (Russia)	2 – 0	(France) Paris Saint-Germain	Moscow, Russia
20:30 MSK (UTC+4)	Rahimić (yellow card) 61'; Semak 64'; Vágner Love 77' (pen.)	Report	Mendy (yellow card) 45'; Badiane (yellow card) 76'	Stadium: Lokomotiv Stadium; Attendance: 29,000; Referee: Massimo Busacca (Switzerland)

20 October 2004 3	Chelsea (England)	2 – 0	(Russia) CSKA Moscow	London, England
22:45 MSK (UTC+4)	Terry 9'; Guðjohnsen 45+1'; Kežman (yellow card) 56'	Report		Stadium: Stamford Bridge; Attendance: 33,945; Referee: Ľuboš Micheľ (Slovakia)

2 November 2004 4	CSKA Moscow (Russia)	0 – 1	(England) Chelsea	Moscow, Russia
20:30 MSK (UTC+4)	Vágner Love (penalty missed) 47'; Olić (yellow card) 74'; Šemberas (yellow card) 90'	Report	Robben 24'; Johnson (yellow card) 61'; Kežman (yellow card) 75'	Stadium: Lokomotiv Stadium; Attendance: 28,000; Referee: Massimo De Santis (Italy)

24 November 2004 5	CSKA Moscow (Russia)	0 – 1	(Portugal) Porto	Moscow, Russia
20:30 MSK (UTC+4)	Ignashevich (penalty missed) 36'; Aldonin (yellow card) 66'; Vágner Love (yellow card) 90'	Report	McCarthy 28'; Hugo Almeida (yellow card) 90'	Stadium: Lokomotiv Stadium; Attendance: 21,500; Referee: Manuel Mejuto González (Spain)

7 December 2004 6	Paris Saint-Germain (France)	1 – 3	(Russia) CSKA Moscow	Paris, France
22:45 MSK (UTC+4)	Pancrate 37'; Pierre-Fanfan (yellow card) 58'; Mendy (yellow card) 80' (yellow-red card) 88'	Report	Semak 28', 64', 70'; Šemberas (yellow card) 42' (yellow-red card) 54'; Zhirkov (yellow card) 88'	Stadium: Parc des Princes; Attendance: 40,000; Referee: Markus Merk (Germany)

Progressed to the UEFA Cup Round of 32 during the 2005 season.

== Statistics ==
As of match played 7 December 2004

=== Appearances and goals ===
No.	Pos	Nat	Player	Total		Premier League		2003–04 Russian Cup		2004–05 Russian Cup		Super Cup		UEFA Champions League	
No.	Pos	Nat	Player	Apps	Goals	Apps	Goals	Apps	Goals	Apps	Goals	Apps	Goals	Apps	Goals
1	GK	(Russia) RUS	Veniamin Mandrykin	9	0	5+1	0	2	0	1	0	0	0	0	0
2	DF	(Lithuania) LTU	Deividas Šemberas	38	0	24	0	3	0	0	0	1	0	10	0
4	DF	(Russia) RUS	Sergei Ignashevich	32	1	22	1	2	0	0	0	1	0	7	0
5	MF	(Russia) RUS	Sergei Semak	45	10	26+4	5	3	0	0+1	0	1	1	6+4	4
6	DF	(Russia) RUS	Aleksei Berezutski	39	0	25+2	0	1	0	0	0	1	0	10	0
7	MF	(Brazil) BRA	Daniel Carvalho	18	2	0+13	1	2+1	0	0	0	0+1	1	1	0
8	MF	(Russia) RUS	Rolan Gusev	39	5	26+2	4	3	0	0	0	1	0	6+1	1
9	FW	(Croatia) CRO	Ivica Olić	34	10	16+8	9	2	1	0	0	1	0	6+1	0
10	MF	(Argentina) ARG	Osmar Ferreyra	18	2	6+7	2	2+1	0	1	0	0	0	0+1	0
11	FW	(Brazil) BRA	Vágner Love	21	13	12	9	0	0	0	0	0	0	8+1	4
14	FW	(Russia) RUS	Dmitri Kirichenko	34	11	11+15	9	1+2	1	1	0	0+1	1	0+3	0
15	DF	(Nigeria) NGR	Chidi Odiah	29	0	19+1	0	2	0	1	0	0	0	5+1	0
17	MF	(Serbia and Montenegro) SCG	Miloš Krasić	12	0	2+5	0	0	0	1	0	0	0	3+1	0
18	MF	(Russia) RUS	Yuri Zhirkov	38	6	22+3	6	1+1	0	0	0	1	0	10	0
19	MF	(Latvia) LAT	Juris Laizāns	9	0	0+4	0	0	0	1	0	0	0	0+4	0
20	MF	(Czech Republic) CZE	Jiří Jarošík	42	6	25+4	5	1+2	0	0	0	0+1	0	9	1
22	MF	(Russia) RUS	Evgeni Aldonin	42	0	25+5	0	1+1	0	0	0	1	0	7+2	0
23	FW	(Moldova) MDA	Sergiu Dadu	4	0	0+1	0	0	0	1	0	0	0	0+2	0
24	DF	(Russia) RUS	Vasili Berezutski	12	0	5+1	0	0	0	1	0	0	0	2+3	0
25	MF	(Bosnia and Herzegovina) BIH	Elvir Rahimić	41	1	26	1	3	0	1	0	1	0	10	0
28	DF	(Ukraine) UKR	Bohdan Shershun	20	0	9+5	0	3	0	1	0	1	0	0+1	0
35	GK	(Russia) RUS	Igor Akinfeev	38	0	25+1	0	1	0	0	0	1	0	10	0
45	DF	(Uzbekistan) UZB	Vitaliy Denisov	1	0	0	0	0	0	1	0	0	0	0	0
Players that left CSKA Moscow on loan during the season:
Players who appeared for CSKA Moscow no longer at the club:
21	FW	(Russia) RUS	Denis Popov	3	0	0+2	0	0	0	1	0	0	0	0	0
29	MF	(Russia) RUS	Artur Tlisov	1	0	0	0	0+1	0	0	0	0	0	0	0

=== Goal scorers ===
Place	Position	Nation	Number	Name	Premier League	2003–04 Russian Cup	2004–05 Russian Cup	Super Cup	UEFA Champions League	Total
1	FW	(Brazil)	11	Vágner Love	9	0	0	0	4	13
2	FW	(Russia)	14	Dmitri Kirichenko	9	1	0	1	0	11
3	FW	(Croatia)	9	Ivica Olić	9	1	0	0	0	10
3	MF	(Russia)	5	Sergei Semak	5	0	0	1	4	10
5	MF	(Russia)	18	Yuri Zhirkov	6	0	0	0	0	6
5	MF	(Czech Republic)	20	Jiří Jarošík	5	0	0	0	1	6
7	MF	(Russia)	8	Rolan Gusev	4	0	0	0	1	5
8	MF	(Argentina)	10	Osmar Ferreyra	2	0	0	0	0	2
8	MF	(Brazil)	7	Daniel Carvalho	1	0	0	1	0	2
10	MF	(Bosnia and Herzegovina)	25	Elvir Rahimić	1	0	0	0	0	1
10	DF	(Russia)	4	Sergei Ignashevich	1	0	0	0	0	1
10				Own goal	1	0	0	0	0	1
				Awarded Goals	0	0	3	0	0	3
				TOTALS	53	2	3	3	10	71

=== Disciplinary record ===
Number	Nation	Position	Name	Premier League		2003–04 Russian Cup		2004–05 Russian Cup		Super Cup		UEFA Champions League		Total	
Number	Nation	Position	Name	Yellow card	Red card	Yellow card	Red card	Yellow card	Red card	Yellow card	Red card	Yellow card	Red card	Yellow card	Red card
1	(Russia)	GK	Veniamin Mandrykin	1	1	0	0	0	0	0	0	0	0	1	1
2	(Lithuania)	DF	Deividas Šemberas	5	0	1	0	0	0	0	0	4	1	10	1
4	(Russia)	DF	Sergei Ignashevich	1	1	0	0	0	0	1	0	0	0	2	1
6	(Russia)	DF	Aleksei Berezutski	2	0	1	0	0	0	0	0	0	0	3	0
5	(Russia)	MF	Sergei Semak	2	0	0	0	1	0	0	0	1	0	4	0
7	(Brazil)	MF	Daniel Carvalho	1	0	0	0	0	0	0	0	0	0	1	0
8	(Russia)	MF	Rolan Gusev	3	0	0	0	0	0	0	0	2	0	5	0
9	(Croatia)	FW	Ivica Olić	2	0	0	0	0	0	1	0	1	0	4	0
10	(Argentina)	MF	Osmar Ferreyra	3	0	0	0	0	0	0	0	0	0	3	0
11	(Brazil)	FW	Vágner Love	3	0	0	0	0	0	0	0	1	0	4	0
14	(Russia)	FW	Dmitri Kirichenko	1	0	0	0	0	0	0	0	0	0	1	0
15	(Nigeria)	DF	Chidi Odiah	5	0	0	0	0	0	0	0	3	0	8	0
18	(Russia)	MF	Yuri Zhirkov	2	1	0	0	0	0	1	0	3	0	6	1
19	(Latvia)	MF	Juris Laizāns	0	0	0	0	0	0	0	0	1	0	1	0
20	(Czech Republic)	MF	Jiří Jarošík	5	0	1	0	0	0	0	0	0	0	6	0
22	(Russia)	MF	Evgeni Aldonin	2	0	0	0	0	0	0	0	1	0	3	0
24	(Russia)	DF	Vasili Berezutski	2	1	0	0	0	0	0	0	0	0	2	1
25	(Bosnia and Herzegovina)	MF	Elvir Rahimić	6	0	0	0	0	0	0	0	1	0	7	0
28	(Ukraine)	DF	Bohdan Shershun	2	1	0	0	2	1	0	0	0	0	4	2
35	(Russia)	GK	Igor Akinfeev	0	1	0	0	0	0	0	0	1	0	1	1
Players out on loan :
Players who left CSKA Moscow during the season:
			TOTALS	48	6	3	0	3	1	3	0	19	1	76	8
