= Radkevich =

Radkevich is a surname and may refer to:

- Evgeny Radkevich (1851–1930), Russian and Soviet general
- Nikolay Radkevich (1888–1916), serial killer
- Svetlana Radkevich (born 1979), Belarusian speed skater
- Vladimir Radkevich (born 1976), UzbekistanI-Kyrgyz football player and coach
