= Vladimir Yeryomkin =

Russian footballer

Personal information
- Full name: Vladimir Vladimirovich Yeryomkin
- Date of birth: 23 January 1988 (age 38)
- Place of birth: Tomsk, Russian SFSR
- Height: 1.80 m (5 ft 11 in)
- Position: Midfielder

Youth career
- FC Tom Tomsk

Senior career*
Years	Team	Apps	(Gls)
2006	FC Fortuna-M Mytishchi		
2006	FC Torpedo Moscow	0	(0)
2007	FC Yelets	8	(0)
2007–2008	FC Torpedo Moscow	18	(1)
2009	FC Torpedo Moscow (amateur)		
2010–2011	FC Torpedo Moscow	0	(0)
2011	→ FC Istra (loan)	3	(0)
- * Club domestic league appearances and goals

Vladimir Vladimirovich Yeryomkin (Russian: Владимир Владимирович Ерёмкин; born 23 January 1988) is a former Russian professional football player.

== Club career ==
He played two seasons in the Russian Football National League for FC Torpedo Moscow.
