= Konstantin Titov (footballer) =

Russian footballer

Personal information
- Full name: Konstantin Vladimirovich Titov
- Date of birth: 13 September 1987 (age 39)
- Place of birth: Yelets, Russian SFSR
- Height: 1.79 m (5 ft 10 in)
- Position: Defender

Youth career
- Orlyonok Yelets

Senior career*
Years	Team	Apps	(Gls)
2004–2009	FC Yelets	116	(7)
2010–2012	FC Yelets (amateur)		
2013	FC Gubkin	11	(0)
2013–2014	FC Oryol	25	(1)
2014–2015	FC Vybor-Kurbatovo Voronezh	7	(0)
2015	FC Yelets (amateur)		
2015–2021	FC Metallurg Lipetsk	135	(5)
- * Club domestic league appearances and goals

Konstantin Vladimirovich Titov (Russian: Константин Владимирович Титов; born 13 September 1987) is a Russian former football player.

== Club career ==
He made his debut in the Russian Football National League for FC Metallurg Lipetsk on 11 July 2021 in a game against FC Tom Tomsk.
