= Aleksei Mikhaylov =

Aleksei or Alexey Mikhaylov may refer to:

- Aleksei Mikhaylov (footballer), Russian footballer
- Alexey Mikhaylov (officer), Red Army colonel
