= Roldugin =

Roldugin (Russian: Ролдугин) is a Russian masculine surname, its feminine counterpart is Roldugina. Notable people with the surname include:

- Aleksandr Roldugin (born 1990), Russian footballer
- Sergei Roldugin (born 1951), Russian cellist
