= Aleksandr Roldugin =

Russian footballer

Personal information
- Full name: Aleksandr Sergeyevich Roldugin
- Date of birth: 6 June 1990 (age 36)
- Place of birth: Polovnevo, Lipetsk Oblast, Russian SFSR
- Height: 1.75 m (5 ft 9 in)
- Position: Midfielder

Youth career
- DYuSSh Krasnoye

Senior career*
Years	Team	Apps	(Gls)
2006	FC Yelets	2	(0)
2008–2009	FC Yelets	49	(1)
2009–2010	FC Metallurg Lipetsk	5	(0)
2010–2012	FC Yelets (amateur)		
2012–2013	FC Spartak Tambov	26	(1)
2013–2014	FC Oryol	25	(0)
2014	FC MITOS Novocherkassk	11	(1)
2015	FC Druzhba Maykop	13	(0)
2015	FC Berkut Armyansk		
2016	FC Titan Klin (amateur)		
2017	FC Metallurg-OEMK Stary Oskol		
- * Club domestic league appearances and goals

Aleksandr Sergeyevich Roldugin (Russian: Александр Серге́евич Ролдугин; born 6 June 1990) is a former Russian professional football player.

== Club career ==
He played one season in the Russian Football National League for FC Metallurg Lipetsk.
