= Elvir Rahimić =

Bosnian footballer (born 1976)

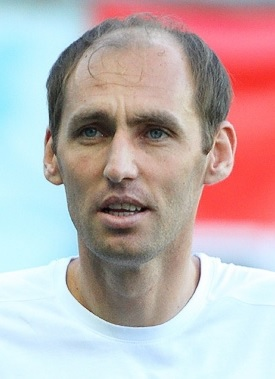
- Rahimić with CSKA Moscow in 2011

Personal information
- Date of birth: 4 April 1976 (age 50)
- Place of birth: Živinice, SFR Yugoslavia
- Height: 1.91 m (6 ft 3 in)
- Position: Defensive midfielder

Youth career
- Slaven Živinice

Senior career*
Years	Team	Apps	(Gls)
1994–1997	Bosna Visoko	36	(3)
1997–1998	Factor Črnuče	33	(6)
1998–1999	Vorwärts Steyr	6	(0)
1999–2001	Anzhi Makhachkala	84	(5)
2001–2014	CSKA Moscow	240	(6)
Total		399	(20)

International career
2007–2013	Bosnia and Herzegovina	40	(0)

Managerial career
- 2014–2015: CSKA Moscow (assistant)
- 2018–2019: Bosnia and Herzegovina (assistant)
- 2021–2023: Bosnia and Herzegovina (assistant)
- * Club domestic league appearances and goals

Elvir Rahimić (born 4 April 1976) is a Bosnian football manager and former player. He was most recently the sporting director of Bosnian Premier League club Željezničar.

Rahimić spent the majority of his career playing for Russian Premier League club CSKA Moscow. He made his senior international debut for Bosnia and Herzegovina in 2007, earning 40 caps until his retirement from international football in 2013.

== Club career ==
Born in Živinice, Rahimić started his career at hometown club Slaven. In 1994, he was signed by Bosna Visoko. In 1997, Rahimić moved to Slovenia for Factor Črnuče, then Austrian side Vorwärts Steyr before he moved to Russia.

The greatest accomplishment for Rahimić was winning the 2004–05 UEFA Cup by beating Sporting Lisbon 3–1 in the final at Estádio José Alvalade. He also played in the 2005 UEFA Super Cup against Liverpool.

Rahimić is one of the most decorated Bosnian players, having won 18 trophies with CSKA Moscow during his 12-year spell with the club.

In January 2013, Rahimić passed the category A coaching license exam, and was appointed as a player-coach at CSKA. Rahimić announced he would retire from the game at the end of the 2013–14 season on 13 May 2014.

== International career ==
Born in Bosnia and Herzegovina, Rahimić was initially invited to play for Uzbekistan (where it was a common practice to invite Russian-speaking foreigners in 2000–2001). However, Rahimić opted for his homeland and made his debut for Bosnia and Herzegovina on 2 June 2007 in a win against Turkey. Including his debut match, he played six in the UEFA Euro 2008 qualifying. He also played in the 2010 FIFA World Cup qualification where the country reached the play-off stage of the competition, as well as in the UEFA Euro 2012 qualifying.

Rahimić earned a total of 40 caps between 2007 and 2013. His final international was an August 2013 friendly game against the United States.

== Career statistics ==
=== Club ===
Club	Season	League		National Cup		Continental^{1}		Other^{2}		Total	
Club	Season	Apps	Goals	Apps	Goals	Apps	Goals	Apps	Goals	Apps	Goals
Anzhi Makhachkala	1999	40	2	—		—		—		40	2
Anzhi Makhachkala	2000	30	3	—		—		—		30	3
Anzhi Makhachkala	2001	14	0	—		—		—		14	0
Anzhi Makhachkala	Total	84	5	—		—		—		84	5
CSKA Moscow	2001	12	0	2	0	—		—		14	0
CSKA Moscow	2002	30	2	3	0	2	0	1	0	36	0
CSKA Moscow	2003	28	1	2	0	2	0	2	0	34	1
CSKA Moscow	2004	26	1	4	0	10	0	1	0	41	1
CSKA Moscow	2005	30	1	7	0	14	0	1	0	52	1
CSKA Moscow	2006	30	1	6	0	7	0	1	0	44	1
CSKA Moscow	2007	27	0	5	0	7	0	1	0	40	0
CSKA Moscow	2008	23	0	3	0	6	0	—		32	0
CSKA Moscow	2009	10	0	2	0	9	0	—		21	0
CSKA Moscow	2010	11	0	0	0	6	0	0	0	17	0
CSKA Moscow	2011–12	12	0	1	0	1	0	0	0	14	0
CSKA Moscow	2012–13	0	0	1	0	0	0	—		1	0
CSKA Moscow	2013–14	1	0	0	0	0	0	—		1	0
CSKA Moscow	Total	240	6	36	0	64	0	7	0	347	6
Career total		324	11	36	0	64	0	7	0	431	11

^{1}Includes UEFA Europa League and UEFA Champions League.

^{2}Includes Russian Super Cup, Russian Premier League Cup and UEFA Super Cup.

== Honours ==
=== Player ===
Bosna Visoko

- Bosnian Second League: 1995–96 (North)

CSKA Moscow

- Russian Premier League: 2003, 2005, 2006, 2012–13, 2013–14
- Russian Cup: 2001–02, 2004–05, 2005–06, 2007–08, 2008–09, 2010–11, 2012–13
- Russian Super Cup: 2004, 2006, 2007, 2009, 2013
- UEFA Cup: 2004–05
