= Yevgeni Ovsyannikov =

Russian footballer

Personal information
- Full name: Yevgeni Vladimirovich Ovsyannikov
- Date of birth: 13 March 1982 (age 44)
- Place of birth: Voronezh, Russian SFSR
- Height: 1.76 m (5 ft 9 1/2 in)
- Position: Forward

Youth career
- SDYuSShOR-14 Voronezh

Senior career*
Years	Team	Apps	(Gls)
2000	FC Fakel-d Voronezh (amateur)		
2001	FC Fakel Voronezh	2	(0)
2002	FC Lokomotiv Liski	23	(4)
2003	FC Yelets	34	(5)
2004	FC Fakel Voronezh	2	(0)
2004	FC Salyut-Energia Belgorod	9	(1)
2005–2006	FC Yelets	56	(7)
2007–2008	FC Dynamo Voronezh	45	(9)
2009–2010	FC Dynamo Voronezh (amateur)		
2012–2013	FC Vybor-Kurbatovo Voronezh (amateur)		
- * Club domestic league appearances and goals

Yevgeni Vladimirovich Ovsyannikov (Russian: Евгений Владимирович Овсянников; born 13 March 1982 in Voronezh) is a former Russian football player. He competed in the Russian Premier League and was associated with the club Fakel Voronezh.
