= Dmitri Kovalenko =

Russian footballer

Personal information
- Full name: Dmitri Vladimirovich Kovalenko
- Date of birth: 2 August 1982 (age 44)
- Place of birth: Arzamas-16, Gorky Oblast, Russian SFSR
- Height: 1.89 m (6 ft 2 1/2 in)
- Position: Defender

Senior career*
Years	Team	Apps	(Gls)
2000–2001	Rotor Volgograd	0	(0)
2000–2001	→ Rotor-2 Volgograd	14	(0)
2002	Metallurg Lipetsk	8	(0)
2002–2003	Yelets	47	(5)
2004–2005	Metallurg Lipetsk	28	(0)
2005	Yelets	12	(1)
2006–2007	Torpedo Zhodino	25	(0)
2008	Olimpia Volgograd	32	(12)
2009	Krasnodar	17	(0)
2009	Volgograd	11	(0)
2010	Torpedo-ZIL Moscow	10	(1)
2011–2012	Petrotrest St. Petersburg	30	(2)
2012–2013	Olimpia Volgograd	27	(3)
2013–2014	Lokomotiv Liski	20	(0)
2014–2015	Rotor Volgograd	18	(4)
2015	Karelia Petrozavodsk	2	(0)
2015	Biolog-Novokubansk Progress	5	(0)
2016	Rotor-2 Volgograd		
- * Club domestic league appearances and goals

Dmitri Vladimirovich Kovalenko (Russian: Дмитрий Владимирович Коваленко; born 2 August 1982) is a former Russian professional footballer.

== Club career ==
He made his Russian Football National League debut for FC Metallurg Lipetsk on 28 March 2004 in a game against FC Arsenal Tula.
