= Mehmet Aksu =

Turkish footballer (born 1980)

Personal information
- Date of birth: 11 January 1980 (age 46)
- Place of birth: Istanbul, Turkey
- Height: 1.80 m (5 ft 11 in)
- Position: Forward

Youth career
- 1996–1998: Galatasaray

Senior career*
Years	Team	Apps	(Gls)
1998–2001	Galatasaray	0	(0)
1998–1999	→ Beykozspor (loan)	30	(18)
1999–2000	→ Bakırköyspor (loan)	18	(7)
2000–2001	→ Malatyaspor (loan)	29	(11)
2001–2003	Beşiktaş	1	(0)
2002–2003	→ Karşıyaka (loan)	6	(0)
2003	→ Antalyaspor (loan)	3	(1)
2003–2004	Rostov	2	(0)
2004	→ Zhenis Astana (loan)	10	(1)
2005–2006	İstanbulspor	17	(1)
2006–2007	Eyüpspor	23	(4)
2007	Adanaspor	12	(3)
2007	Tepecikspor	6	(1)
2008–2010	İstanbulspor	33	(5)
2010	Elbistanspor	0	(0)
2010–2011	Foça Belediyespor	2	(0)
2011–2012	Doğan Türk Birliği		
2012–2013	Çubukluspor		
2018	Üsküdar Anadoluspor		
2018–2019	Kücükayasofyaspor		
Total		192+	(52+)

International career
1997–1998	Turkey U17	6	(0)
1997–1998	Turkey U18	3	(1)
1999	Turkey U19	1	(0)
- * Club domestic league appearances and goals

Mehmet Aksu (born 11 January 1980) is a Turkish retired footballer who played as a forward.
