= 2003 in Russian football =

2003 season

2003 in Russian football saw the first title for PFC CSKA Moscow. Spartak Moscow, the Cup winners, had the worst league finish since 1976. The national team qualified for Euro 2004.

== National team ==
Russia national football team qualified for the Euro 2004. After finishing second to Switzerland in group 10, Russia overcame Wales in play-offs.

Date	Venue	Opponents	Score^{1}	Competition	Russia scorers	Match report
12 February 2003	Tsirion Stadium, Limassol (A)	Cyprus	1–0	FT	Dmitry Khokhlov	rsssf
13 February 2003	Tsirion Stadium, Limassol (N)	Romania	4–2	FT	Andrei Karyaka, Andrei Arshavin, Rolan Gusev, 1 own goal	rsssf
29 March 2003	Loro-Boriçi Stadium, Shkodër (A)	Albania	1–3	ECQ	Andrei Karyaka	uefa
30 April 2003	Locomotive Stadium, Tbilisi (A)	Georgia	0–1	ECQ		uefa
7 June 2003	St. Jakob-Park, Basel (A)	Switzerland	2–2	ECQ	Sergey Ignashevich (2)	uefa
20 August 2003	Lokomotiv Stadium, Moscow (H)	Israel	1–2	F	Sergei Semak	rsssf
6 September 2003	Lansdowne Road, Dublin (A)	Republic of Ireland	1–1	ECQ	Sergey Ignashevich	uefa
10 September 2003	Lokomotiv Stadium, Moscow (H)	Switzerland	4–1	ECQ	Dmitri Bulykin (3), Alexander Mostovoi	uefa
11 October 2003	Lokomotiv Stadium, Moscow (H)	Georgia	3–1	ECQ	Dmitri Bulykin, Egor Titov, Dmitri Sychev	uefa
15 November 2003	Lokomotiv Stadium, Moscow (H)	Wales	0–0	ECQP		uefa
19 November 2003	Millennium Stadium, Cardiff (A)	Wales	1–0	ECQP	Vadim Evseev	uefa

1. Russia score given first

Key

- H = Home match
- A = Away match
- N = Neutral ground
- F = Friendly
- FT = Friendly tournament
- ECQ = 2004 UEFA European Football Championship qualifying, Group 10
- ECQP = 2004 UEFA European Football Championship qualifying, play-off

== Leagues ==
=== Premier League ===
Pos	Team	Pld	W	D	L	GF	GA	GD	Pts	Qualification or relegation
1	CSKA Moscow (C)	30	17	8	5	56	32	+24	59	Qualification to Champions League second qualifying round
2	Zenit St. Petersburg	30	16	8	6	48	32	+16	56	Qualification to UEFA Cup second qualifying round
3	Rubin Kazan	30	15	8	7	44	29	+15	53	Qualification to UEFA Cup second qualifying round
4	Lokomotiv Moscow	30	15	7	8	54	33	+21	52	
5	Shinnik Yaroslavl	30	12	11	7	43	34	+9	47	Qualification to Intertoto Cup second round
6	Dynamo Moscow	30	12	10	8	42	29	+13	46	
7	Saturn	30	12	9	9	40	37	+3	45	
8	Torpedo Moscow	30	11	10	9	42	38	+4	43	
9	Krylia Sovetov Samara	30	11	9	10	38	33	+5	42	
10	Spartak Moscow	30	10	6	14	38	48	−10	36	Qualification to Intertoto Cup first round
11	Rostov	30	8	10	12	30	42	−12	34	
12	Rotor Volgograd	30	9	5	16	33	44	−11	32	
13	Spartak-Alania Vladikavkaz	30	9	4	17	23	43	−20	31	
14	Torpedo-Metallurg Moscow	30	8	5	17	25	39	−14	29	
15	Uralan Elista (R)	30	6	10	14	23	47	−24	28	Relegation to First Division
16	Chernomorets Novorossiysk (R)	30	6	6	18	30	49	−19	24	Relegation to First Division

Source: RFPL
Rules for classification: 1st points; 2nd matches won; 3rd head-to-head (points, matches won, goal difference, goals scored, away goals scored); 4th goal difference
(C) Champions; (R) Relegated

=== First Division ===
The First Division was extended from 18 teams in 2005 to 22. Amkar and Kuban won the promotion on the dramatic final day of the season, leaving Terek and Tom in the First Division.

Pos	Team	Pld	W	D	L	GF	GA	GD	Pts	Promotion or relegation
1	Amkar Perm (P)	42	25	12	5	50	20	+30	87	Promotion to Premier League
2	Kuban Krasnodar (P)	42	27	5	10	75	38	+37	86	Promotion to Premier League
3	Tom Tomsk	42	25	10	7	55	23	+32	85 (Note: Head-to-head record: Tom – Terek 2–1, Terek – Tom 0–1.)	
4	Terek Grozny	42	25	10	7	56	21	+35	85	Qualification to UEFA Cup second qualifying round (Note: Qualified as 2003–04 Russian Cup winners.)
5	Dynamo St. Petersburg (R)	42	23	8	11	66	37	+29	77	Relegation to Second Division (Note: Dynamo Saint Petersburg were expelled from the league due to financial irregularities)
6	Anzhi Makhachkala	42	19	13	10	52	33	+19	70	
7	Baltika Kaliningrad	42	18	10	14	58	49	+9	64	
8	Metallurg Lipetsk	42	17	11	14	53	38	+15	62	
9	Sokol Saratov	42	16	14	12	52	36	+16	62	
10	SKA-Khabarovsk	42	16	12	14	51	47	+4	60	
11	Lokomotiv Chita	42	19	0	23	55	66	−11	57	
12	Khimki	42	16	9	17	36	46	−10	57	
13	Metallurg-Kuzbass Novokuznetsk	42	14	12	16	42	47	−5	54	
14	Lisma-Mordovia Saransk	42	15	8	19	54	60	−6	53	
15	Spartak Nalchik	42	14	10	18	34	49	−15	52	
16	Neftekhimik Nizhnekamsk	42	14	9	19	50	60	−10	51	
17	SOYUZ-Gazprom Izhevsk	42	12	14	16	44	56	−12	50	
18	Fakel Voronezh (R)	42	13	10	19	44	56	−12	49	Relegation to Second Division
19	Ural Sverdlovsk Oblast (R)	42	11	8	23	43	65	−22	41	Relegation to Second Division
20	Kristall Smolensk (R)	42	10	5	27	40	72	−32	35	Relegation to Second Division
21	Volgar-Gazprom Astrakhan (R)	42	6	11	25	28	60	−32	29	Relegation to Second Division
22	Lada-Togliatti (R)	42	5	3	34	27	86	−59	18	Relegation to Second Division

Source: PFL, RSSSF
Rules for classification: 1st points; 2nd matches won; 3rd head-to-head (points, matches won, goal difference, goals scored, away goals scored); 4th goal difference; 5th goals scored; 6th away goals scored
(P) Promoted; (R) Relegated
Notes:

Aleksandr Panov of Dynamo SPb became the top goalscorer with 23 goals.

=== Second Division ===
The Ural and Povolzhye zones of the Second Division were merged because of low number of clubs. The following clubs have earned promotion by winning tournaments in their respective zones:

- FC Arsenal Tula (West)
- FC Oryol (Centre)
- FC Dynamo Makhachkala (South)
- FC KAMAZ Naberezhnye Chelny (Ural-Povolzhye)
- FC Luch-Energia Vladivostok (East)

== Cups ==
In a newly introduced Russian Super Cup Lokomotiv overcame CSKA 4–3 on penalties after the match ended 1–1. The match was held at the newly reconstructed Lokomotiv Stadium.

The Russian Cup was won by Spartak Moscow, who beat Rostov in the final 1–0.

== UEFA club competitions ==
=== 2002–03 UEFA Champions League ===
Lokomotiv Moscow participated in the second group stage of the 2002–03 UEFA Champions League, where they finished fourth with just one point in a group which included A.C. Milan, Real Madrid, and Borussia Dortmund.

=== 2003–04 UEFA Champions League ===
CSKA Moscow were unsuccessful in the 2003–04 UEFA Champions League, as they lost in the second qualifying round to FK Vardar 2–3 on aggregate.

Lokomotiv Moscow beat FC Shakhtar Donetsk to qualify for the group stage. They finished second in a group with Arsenal F.C., Internazionale Milano F.C., and FC Dynamo Kyiv. Lokomotiv were level on points with Inter but qualified for the knock-out rounds thanks to a 3–0 home win and away draw.

=== 2003–04 UEFA Cup ===
Torpedo Moscow beat F.C. Domagnano 9–0 on aggregate in the qualifying round. In the first round, they needed a penalty shootout to overcome PFC CSKA Sofia. In the second round, Torpedo lost 1–2 on aggregate to Villarreal CF.

Spartak Moscow knocked out Esbjerg fB and Dinamo București in the first two rounds and qualified for the spring phase of the competition.
