= Dzmitry Rawneyka =

Belarusian footballer and coach

Personal information
- Full name: Dzmitry Vasilevich Rawneyka
- Date of birth: 13 May 1980 (age 46)
- Place of birth: Grodno, Byelorussian SSR, Soviet Union
- Height: 1.81 m (5 ft 11 1/2 in)
- Position: Defender

Team information
- Current team: Belarus (assistant)

Youth career
- 1996–1999: Neman-Belcard Grodno

Senior career*
Years	Team	Apps	(Gls)
1996–2002	Neman Grodno	110	(8)
1996–1999	→ Neman-2 Grodno	60	(8)
2003–2005	Torpedo Moscow	32	(1)
2004	→ Rotor Volgograd (loan)	6	(1)
2006	Shakhtyor Soligorsk	11	(1)
2006–2007	Neman Grodno	30	(0)
2008	Dnepr Mogilev	29	(0)
2009–2014	Neman Grodno	132	(3)

International career
2000–2001	Belarus U21	13	(0)
2003–2004	Belarus	8	(0)

Managerial career
- 2017–2019: Belarus U21 (assistant)
- 2019–: Belarus (assistant)
- * Club domestic league appearances and goals

Dzmitry Vasilevich Rawneyka (Belarusian: Дзмітрый Васiлевiч Раўнейка; Russian: Дмитрий Васильевич Ровнейко; born 13 May 1980) is a former Belarusian professional footballer. He is currently a part of the coaching staff of Belarus.

== Career ==
Born in Grodno, Rawneyka began playing football in FC Neman Grodno's youth system. He joined the senior side and made his Belarusian Premier League debut in 1998. He had a spell in the Russian Premier League with FC Torpedo Moscow and FC Rotor Volgograd but has spent most of his playing career with Neman Grodno.

== International ==
Rawneyka has made eight appearances for the Belarus national football team.
