= Maksim Povorov =

Russian footballer

Personal information
- Full name: Maksim Yevgenyevich Povorov
- Date of birth: 17 September 1977 (age 49)
- Place of birth: Moscow, Russian SFSR
- Height: 1.83 m (6 ft 0 in)
- Position: Defender

Senior career*
Years	Team	Apps	(Gls)
1993–1998	FC Dynamo-2 Moscow	127	(8)
1997–1998	FC Dynamo Moscow	1	(0)
1999	FC Kristall Smolensk	22	(1)
2000–2001	FC Fakel Voronezh	4	(0)
2001–2005	FC Amkar Perm	135	(2)
2006	FC Ural Sverdlovsk Oblast	30	(5)
2007	FC Shinnik Yaroslavl	17	(0)
2008–2009	FC Ural Sverdlovsk Oblast	72	(1)
2010–2012	FC Shinnik Yaroslavl	41	(0)
2012–2013	FC Dolgoprudny	7	(0)

International career
1999	Russia U-21	3	(0)
- * Club domestic league appearances and goals

Maksim Yevgenyevich Povorov (Russian: Максим Евгеньевич Поворов; born 17 September 1977) is a Russian former footballer.
