= Andrei Trofimov =

Russian footballer

Personal information
- Full name: Andrei Mikhailovich Trofimov
- Date of birth: 2 July 1985 (age 41)
- Height: 1.78 m (5 ft 10 in)
- Position: Midfielder

Senior career*
Years	Team	Apps	(Gls)
2001	FC Neftekhimik Nizhnekamsk	0	(0)
2002–2003	PFC CSKA Moscow	0	(0)
2004	FC Neftekhimik Nizhnekamsk	16	(0)
2005–2007	FC Zenit-2 St. Petersburg	56	(1)
2008	FC Alnas Almetyevsk	5	(0)
2009–2010	FC Neftekhimik Nizhnekamsk	44	(4)
2011–2012	FC Rusichi Oryol	30	(2)
2013	FC Shinnik Nizhekamsk		
- * Club domestic league appearances and goals

Andrei Mikhailovich Trofimov (Russian: Андрей Михайлович Трофимов; born 2 July 1985) is a former Russian professional football player.

== Club career ==
He played in the Russian Football National League for FC Neftekhimik Nizhnekamsk in 2004.
