= Igor Yanovsky =

Russian footballer

Personal information
- Full name: Igor Sergeyevich Yanovsky
- Date of birth: 3 August 1974 (age 52)
- Place of birth: Ordzhonikidze, USSR
- Height: 1.87 m (6 ft 1 1/2 in)
- Position: Defender

Youth career
- Spartak Ordzhonikidze

Senior career*
Years	Team	Apps	(Gls)
1990–1992	Avtodor Vladikavkaz	35	(9)
1993–1998	Spartak-Alania Vladikavkaz	171	(35)
1998–2001	Paris Saint-Germain	68	(2)
2001–2003	CSKA Moscow	66	(10)
2004	Alania Vladikavkaz	26	(1)
2005–2006	Châteauroux	14	(0)
Total		380	(57)

International career
1994–1995	Russia U-21	10	(0)
1996–2003	Russia	32	(1)
- * Club domestic league appearances and goals

Igor Sergeyevich Yanovsky (Russian: Игорь Сергеевич Яновский; born 3 August 1974) is a Russian retired association football player.

He played for a few clubs, including Alania Vladikavkaz, Paris Saint-Germain (France), CSKA Moscow, and LB Châteauroux (France).

He played for Russia national football team and was a participant at the Euro 1996.He became the winner Cyprus International Football Tournament 2003 with the national team . Yanovsky announced his retirement on 27 July 2006 .

== Playing career ==
1991	Avtodor Vladikavkaz	Second League 3rd level	1/0
1992	Avtodor-Olaf Vladikavkaz	Second League 3rd level	34/9
1993	Spartak Vladikavkaz	Top League 1st level	33/4
1994	Spartak Vladikavkaz	Top League 1st level	26/3
1995	Spartak-Alania Vladikavkaz	Top League 1st level	29/2
1996	Alania Vladikavkaz	Top League 1st level	34/5
1997	Alania Vladikavkaz	Top League 1st level	33/13
1998	Alania Vladikavkaz	Top League 1st level	16/8
1998–99	Paris Saint-Germain	Ligue 1 1st level	31/0
1999–00	Paris Saint-Germain	Ligue 1 1st level	23/2
2000–01	Paris Saint-Germain	Ligue 1 1st level	14/0
2001	CSKA	Premier League 1st level	12/1
2002	CSKA	Premier League 1st level	29/4
2003	CSKA	Premier League 1st level	25/5
2004	Alania Vladikavkaz	Premier League 1st level	26/1
2005–06	Châteauroux	Ligue 2 2nd level	14/0

* – played games and goals

== Honours ==
- Russian Premier League winner in 1995, 2003
- Russian Cup winner in 2002
