= Denis Yevsikov =

Russian footballer and coach

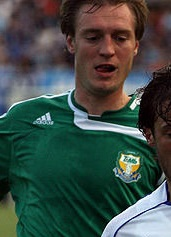
- Yevsikov in 2007

Personal information
- Full name: Denis Sergeyevich Yevsikov
- Date of birth: 19 February 1981 (age 45)
- Place of birth: Vladimir, Russian SFSR
- Height: 1.87 m (6 ft 2 in)
- Position: Defender

Youth career
- SDYuShOR Vladimir

Senior career*
Years	Team	Apps	(Gls)
1999–2003	CSKA Moscow	85	(0)
1999–2000	→ CSKA-d Moscow	37	(3)
2004	Lokomotiv Moscow	0	(0)
2004–2005	Terek Grozny	10	(0)
2006–2007	Spartak Nalchik	27	(1)
2007–2009	Tom Tomsk	21	(0)
2010	Torpedo-ZIL Moscow	5	(1)

International career
2001–2003	Russia U-21	7	(0)
2003	Russia	4	(0)

Managerial career
- 2015–2019: Strogino Moscow (youth teams)
- 2019–2020: Kolomna
- 2021–2022: Khimki (U-19)
- 2022: Olimp-Dolgoprudny (caretaker)
- 2022: Khimki-M
- 2024–2025: Torpedo Vladimir
- * Club domestic league appearances and goals

Denis Sergeyevich Yevsikov (Russian: Денис Серге́евич Евсиков; born 19 February 1981) is a Russian football coach and a former defender.

== Honours ==
- Russian Premier League winner: 2003.
- Russian Premier League runner-up: 2002.
- Russian Cup winner: 2002.
- Russian Cup runner-up: 2000.
- Top 33 players year-end list: 2002.

== International career ==
Yevsikov played his first game for Russia on 12 February 2003 in a friendly against Cyprus.
