= Andrei Solomatin =

Russian footballer

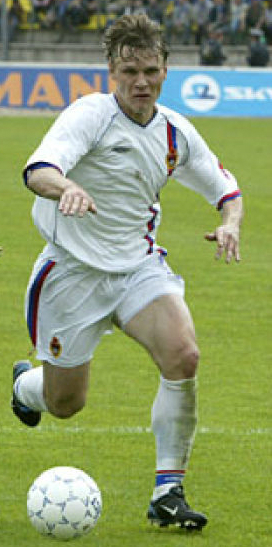

Personal information
- Full name: Andrei Yuryevich Solomatin
- Date of birth: 9 September 1975 (age 51)
- Place of birth: Moscow, Russian SFSR
- Height: 1.83 m (6 ft 0 in)
- Positions: Defender; midfielder

Youth career
- Torpedo Moscow

Senior career*
| Years | Team | Apps | (Gls) |
| 1992 | Torpedo Moscow | 8 | (1) |
| 1992–1994 | TRASKO Moscow | 54 | (8) |
| 1995–2001 | Lokomotiv Moscow | 143 | (7) |
| 2001–2003 | CSKA Moscow | 53 | (3) |
| 2004 | Kuban Krasnodar | 8 | (0) |
| 2004 | Seongnam | 2 | (0) |
| 2005 | Obolon Kyiv | 9 | (0) |
| 2005 | Krylia Sovetov Samara | 9 | (0) |
| 2006 | Spartak Nizhny Novgorod | 16 | (0) |
| 2006 | Anzhi Makhachkala | 13 | (1) |
| 2007 | Torpedo Moscow | 5 | (0) |
| Total | | 320 | (20) |

International career
| 1995–1997 | Russia U-21 | 23 | (3) |
| 1999 | Russia-2 | 1 | (0) |
| 1998–2003 | Russia | 13 | (1) |

Managerial career
- 2014–2015: Chertanovo Moscow
- * Club domestic league appearances and goals

Andrei Yuryevich Solomatin (Russian: Андрей Юрьевич Соломатин; born 9 September 1975) is a Russian football manager and a former player. Since 2023, he has been part of a Russian irregular unit in the Russian invasion of Ukraine.

== Club career ==
Born in Moscow, Solomatin he is product of Topredo Moskva youth academy. Although he started and finished his footballing career as a player at Torpedo, he played mostly for Lokomotiv Moskva and CSKA Moskva from 1995 to 2003, before switching several clubs in Russia outside Moscow as well as South Korea and Ukraine. He retired from playing in 2007 at the age of 31.

== International ==
He played 13 matches for the Russian national team and was a participant at the 2002 FIFA World Cup.

== Military career ==
In August 2023, Solomatin announced that he was joining the Espaniola Battalion of the Russian Military Forces as a volunteer. Serving in the Russian invasion of Ukraine, he was initially stationed near Bakhmut under the callsign "Soloma". He was promoted to deputy brigade commander by August 2025.

== Honours ==
Lokomotiv Moscow

- Russian Premier League: 2003
- Russian Cup: 1995–96, 1996–97, 1999–2000, 2000–01

CSKA Moscow

- Russian Cup: 2001–02

== International goals ==
Results list Russia's goal tally first.

| Date | Venue | Opponent | Score | Result | Competition |
|---|---|---|---|---|---|
| 17 May 2002 | Moscow, Russia | Belarus | 1 goal | 1–1 | LG Cup |
