= Vladimir Radkevich =

Uzbekistani footballer (born 1976)

Personal information
- Full name: Vladimir Valeryevich Radkevich
- Date of birth: 31 March 1976 (age 50)
- Place of birth: Fergana, Soviet Union
- Height: 1.85 m (6 ft 1 in)
- Position: Centre-back

Team information
- Current team: FC Zenit Penza (assistant manager)

Senior career*
Years	Team	Apps	(Gls)
1996–2001	FK Neftchy Farg'ona	?	(?)
2002–2004	FC Rotor Volgograd	81	(4)
2005–2007	FC Ural Sverdlovsk Oblast	71	(5)
2008	FC SKA-Energia Khabarovsk	28	(2)
2009–2010	FK Neftchi Farg'ona	26	(2)

International career
	Kyrgyzstan U-19	0	(0)
2005–2006	Uzbekistan	5	(0)

Managerial career
- 2017–2022: FC Zenit Penza (assistant)
- 2022–2023: FC Zenit Penza
- 2023–: FC Zenit Penza (assistant)
- * Club domestic league appearances and goals

Vladimir Radkevich (Kyrgyz: Владимир Валерьевич Радкевич, Vladimir Valeryeviç Radkeviç; born 31 March 1976) is an Uzbekistani-Kyrgyzstani football coach and a former player of Russian roots. He is an assistant manager of Russian club FC Zenit Penza.

== Club career ==
Radkevich previously played for FC Rotor Volgograd in Russian Premier League as well as FC Ural and FC SKA-Energia Khabarovsk in the Russian First Division.

== International ==
He was a member of the Uzbekistan national football team.

== Club career stats ==
As of 29 November 2008

Season	Team	Country	Division	Apps	Goals
1996	FK Neftchy Farg'ona	Uzbekistan	1	??	??
1997	FK Neftchy Farg'ona	Uzbekistan	1	??	??
1998	FK Neftchy Farg'ona	Uzbekistan	1	??	??
1999	FK Neftchy Farg'ona	Uzbekistan	1	??	??
2000	FK Neftchy Farg'ona	Uzbekistan	1	29	1
2001	FK Neftchy Farg'ona	Uzbekistan	1	32	5
2002	FC Rotor Volgograd	Russia	1	29	0
2003	FC Rotor Volgograd	Russia	1	28	2
2004	FC Rotor Volgograd	Russia	1	24	2
2005	FC Ural Sverdlovsk Oblast	Russia	2	33	1
2006	FC Ural Sverdlovsk Oblast	Russia	2	24	1
2007	FC Ural Sverdlovsk Oblast	Russia	2	14	3
2008	FC SKA-Energia Khabarovsk	Russia	2	28	2
2009	FK Neftchy Farg'ona	Uzbekistan	1	20	2
2010	FK Neftchy Farg'ona	Uzbekistan	1	6	0
