= Ruslan Nakhushev =

Russian footballer (born 1984)

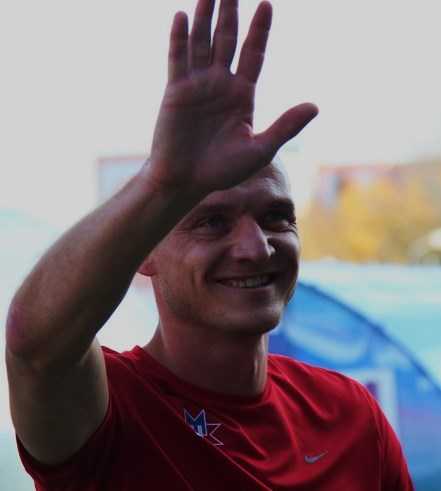
- Nakhushev with Mordovia in September 2014

Personal information
- Full name: Ruslan Yuryevich Nakhushev
- Date of birth: 5 September 1984 (age 42)
- Place of birth: Nalchik, Soviet Union
- Height: 1.84 m (6 ft 0 in)
- Position: Left back

Youth career
- Elbrus
- Spartak-2 (Nalchik)

Senior career*
Years	Team	Apps	(Gls)
2000–2002	Spartak Nalchik	14	(0)
2002–2004	CSKA Moscow	0	(0)
2004	→ Anzhi Makhachkala (loan)	32	(4)
2005	Khimki	21	(6)
2006–2010	Saturn Moscow Oblast	94	(2)
2011–2012	Lokomotiv Moscow	1	(0)
2011–2012	→ Tom Tomsk (loan)	16	(1)
2012–2013	Krasnodar	17	(0)
2014–2016	Mordovia Saransk	47	(0)

International career
2003–2006	Russia U-21	23	(3)
- * Club domestic league appearances and goals

Ruslan Yuryevich Nakhushev (Russian: Руслан Юрьевич Нахушев, Kabardian: Ныхъущ Юрий и къуэ Урыслан; born 5 September 1984) is a Russian former professional footballer.

== Life and career ==
Nakhushev was born on 5 September 1984 in Nalchik, Russian SFSR, to Circassian (Kabardian) parents.

He played 2 games for the PFC CSKA Moscow main squad in the Russian Premier League Cup. He also played 1 game in the UEFA Intertoto Cup 2008 for FC Saturn Moscow Oblast.

== Personal life ==
Ruslan Nakhushev is married to Alena Nakhusheva. The couple have two children: a son (born July 2009) and a daughter (born 6 May 2012).

== Honours and achievements ==
=== Khimki ===
- Russian Cup finalist: 2004–05

=== Mordovia ===
- National Football League (FNL) winner: 2015–16
