= Bohdan Shershun =

Ukrainian footballer (1981–2024)

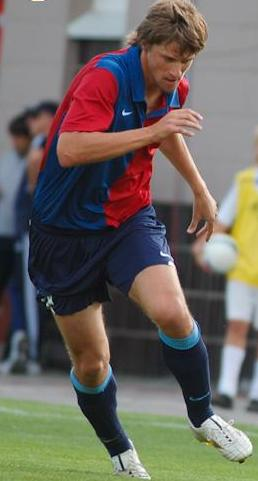
- Shershun in 2010

Personal information
- Full name: Bohdan Mykolayovych Shershun
- Date of birth: 14 May 1981
- Place of birth: Khmelnytskyi, Ukrainian SSR, USSR
- Date of death: 7 January 2024 (aged 42)
- Place of death: Belgium
- Height: 1.92 m (6 ft 4 in)
- Position: Centre-back

Youth career
- Podillia Khmelnytskyi
- DVUFK Dnipropetrovsk

Senior career*
Years	Team	Apps	(Gls)
1997–2002	Dnipro Dnipropetrovsk	52	(0)
1997–2001	→ Dnipro-2 Dnipropetrovsk	40	(2)
2000–2001	→ Dnipro-3 Dnipropetrovsk	8	(0)
2002–2005	CSKA Moscow	76	(2)
2005–2010	Dnipro Dnipropetrovsk	79	(4)
2009–2010	→ Arsenal Kyiv (loan)	25	(0)
2010–2012	Arsenal Kyiv	17	(0)
2012	→ Kryvbas Kryvyi Rih (loan)	10	(0)
2012–2013	Kryvbas Kryvyi Rih	8	(1)
2013–2014	Volyn Lutsk	21	(1)
2015–2017	Sluch Starokostiantyniv	28	(2)
Total		364	(12)

International career
2000–2003	Ukraine U21	25	(1)
2003–2006	Ukraine	4	(0)

Managerial career
- Sluch Starokostiantyniv (assistant)
Medal record
Men's football
Representing Ukraine
UEFA European Under-18 Championship
Runner-up	2000 Germany
- * Club domestic league appearances and goals

Bohdan Mykolayovych Shershun (Ukrainian: Богдан Миколайович Шершун; 14 May 1981 – 7 January 2024) was a Ukrainian professional footballer who played as a centre-back. He competed in international competitions for the Ukraine national team.

== Career ==
Shershun was born in a family of a football coach Mykola Shershun who served as an assistant coach with Vitaliy Kvartsianyi in Podillia and previously played at regional level and served as a referee for some time (1991–1993). Shershun started to play football at academy of the hometown's Podillia and later the Dnipro sports college. Among first coaches of Shershun was Ihor Vetrohonov, a native of Dnipro. In 1997 and 1998 he was a member of the Ukraine national under-16 football team participating in the continental competitions.

At professional competitions Shershun debuted in 1997 for FC Dnipro that was managed by Vyacheslav Hroznyi and later Mykola Fedorenko. In 1997 Kvartsianyi was offering Shershun to join his team (Podillia), but he refused. In 2002 at age of 21 (more precisely 20, during the 2001–02 season's winter break) he moved to play for PFC CSKA Moscow that picked him up as a former member of Ukrainian squad on finals of the Euro 2000 (under-18) and the 2001 World Championship (under-20). With CSKA, Shershun won the UEFA Cup, but didn't play in the final. According to Kvartsianyi, Shershun was also invited to Dynamo, but he believed that due to the Dynamo's training regime of Valeriy Lobanovskyi, Shershun chose to stay with Dnipro and later joining CSKA.

In 2005 Shershun was very happy to sign a new contract with his native club. He also was very complimentary about the level of the Russian football yet decided not to bother staying in the Russian Federation. Shershun didn't consider his transfer to Dnipro as a "step down" in his career.

He signed 2+1 years contract with Arsenal Kyiv on 21 July 2010. After Arsenal, Shershun signed with Kryvbas Kryvyi Rih that was led by Vitaliy Kvartsianyi and later, after Kryvbas went bankrupt, along with Kvartsianyi transferred to Volyn Lutsk.

Shershun retired from professional football in 2014 and enrolled into the FFU (UAF today) coaching courses. He said that he was not interested to continue his career in Azerbaijan and Kazakhstan, while does not want to go to Russia due to political situation. For couple of more seasons, 2015 to 2017, he played at regional level for Sluch Starokostiantyniv (Khmelnytskyi Oblast).

In 2019, Shershun said that the head coach of CSKA and the Russian national football team Valery Gazzaev offered him to apply for a Russian passport, promising to regularly invite him to the Russian national team, but the player refused. After this conversation, Shershun, according to his own words, his participation in matches has decreased.

Before 2024 he served as a football expert on television.

Shershun died on 7 January 2024, at the age of 42, after a long illness.

== Honours ==
=== Team ===
Dnipro

- Ukrainian Premier League third place: 2000–01

CSKA Moscow

- Russian Football Premier League: 2003, 2005
- Russian Cup: 2002, 2005
- Russian Super Cup: 2004
- UEFA Cup: 2005
- UEFA Super Cup runner-up: 2005

Ukraine

- UEFA European Under-19 Championship runner-up: 2000

=== Individual ===
- Merited Master of Sports

== Personal life ==
Shershun was married.

== See also ==
- 2001 FIFA World Youth Championship squads#Ukraine
