= Aleksei Nikolayev (footballer, born 1985) =

Russian footballer

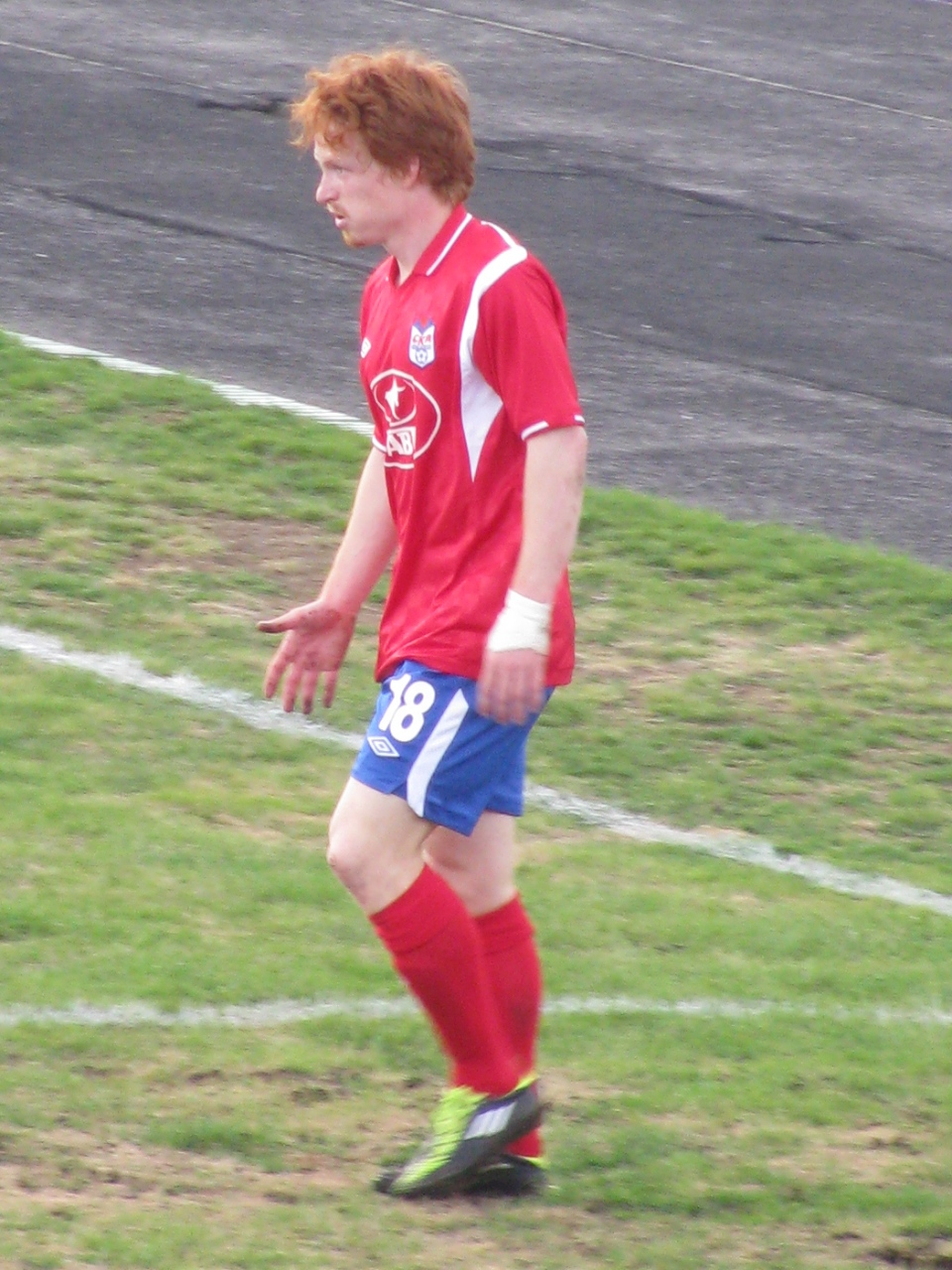

Personal information
- Full name: Aleksei Lvovich Nikolayev
- Date of birth: 12 January 1985 (age 41)
- Place of birth: Rostov-on-Don, Russian SFSR
- Height: 1.74 m (5 ft 9 in)
- Position: Midfielder

Youth career
- PFC CSKA Moscow

Senior career*
Years	Team	Apps	(Gls)
2001–2005	PFC CSKA Moscow	0	(0)
2005	FC Presnya Moscow	8	(1)
2006	FC SKA Rostov-on-Don	2	(0)
2007–2009	FC Taganrog	47	(6)
2010	FC Astrakhan	28	(1)
2011	FC SKA Rostov-on-Don	22	(3)
2012–2013	FC Torpedo Armavir	31	(0)
2013–2014	FC SKVO Rostov-on-Don	32	(3)
2014	FC Torpedo Armavir	0	(0)
2016	FC Chayka Peschanokopskoye	5	(0)
2017–2018	FC Akademiya Futbola Rostov-on-Don	26	(2)
- * Club domestic league appearances and goals

Aleksei Lvovich Nikolayev (Russian: Алексей Львович Николаев; born 12 January 1985) is a Russian former professional football player.

== Club career ==
Nikolayev made his debut for the senior squad of PFC CSKA Moscow on 29 March 2003 in a Russian Premier League Cup game against FC Zenit Saint Petersburg.
