= Aleksei Mikhaylov (footballer) =

Russian footballer

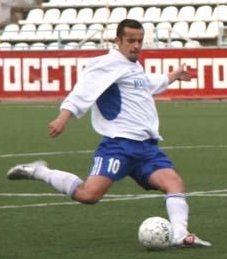
- Aleksei Mikhailov in 2007

Personal information
- Full name: Aleksei Vladimirovich Mikhaylov
- Date of birth: 20 February 1983 (age 43)
- Place of birth: Moscow, Russian SFSR
- Height: 1.81 m (5 ft 11 1/2 in)
- Position: Midfielder

Youth career
- FC Dynamo Moscow

Senior career*
Years	Team	Apps	(Gls)
1999–2000	FC Dynamo-d Moscow	37	(1)
2000–2001	FC Serp i Molot Moscow		
2001–2005	FC Dynamo Moscow	17	(1)
2003	→ FC Dynamo-molodyozhnaya Moscow (loan)		
2003	→ FC Dynamo St. Petersburg (loan)	20	(5)
2006	FC Ryazan-Agrokomplekt Ryazan	15	(1)
2006	FC Khimki	2	(0)
2007–2008	Maccabi Moscow		
- * Club domestic league appearances and goals

Aleksei Vladimirovich Mikhaylov (Russian: Алексей Владимирович Михайлов; born 20 February 1983 in Moscow) is a former Russian football player.
