= Denis Popov (footballer, born 1979) =

Russian footballer

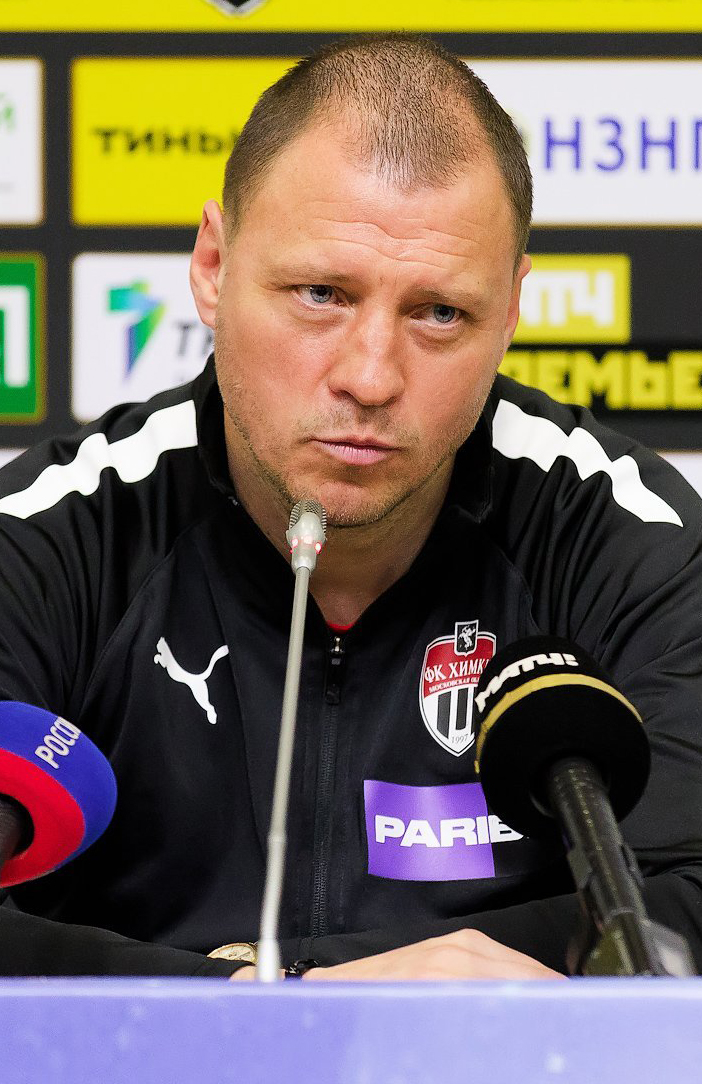
- Popov coaching Khimki in 2022

Personal information
- Full name: Denis Aleksandrovich Popov
- Date of birth: 4 February 1979 (age 47)
- Place of birth: Novorossiysk, Russian SFSR
- Position: Forward

Youth career
- 1995–1996: Chernomorets Novorossiysk

Senior career*
Years	Team	Apps	(Gls)
1996	Chernomorets Novorossiysk	2	(0)
1997	Kuban Slavyansk-na-Kubani	27	(16)
1998–2000	Chernomorets Novorossiysk	46	(11)
2001–2004	CSKA Moscow	70	(19)
2004–2007	Kuban Krasnodar	43	(9)
2006	→ Chernomorets Novorossiysk (loan)	6	(6)
2006	→ Dinamo Minsk (loan)	6	(3)
2007	→ Spartak Nalchik (loan)	4	(0)
2008	Chernomorets Novorossiysk	27	(15)
2008	Torpedo Moscow	14	(9)
2009	Khimki	2	(0)
Total		247	(88)

International career
2000	Russia U-21	2	(0)
2001–2003	Russia	5	(0)

Managerial career
- 2016–2017: Druzhba Maykop
- 2019: Dinamo Minsk (assistant)
- 2020–2021: SKA Rostov-on-Don (assistant)
- 2021: SKA Rostov-on-Don
- 2021–2022: SKA-Khabarovsk (assistant)
- 2022: Khimki (assistant)
- 2022: Ufa
- 2023: Alania Vladikavkaz (assistant)
- 2024: SKA Rostov-on-Don
- 2025: Murom
- 2026: Chernomorets Novorossiysk
- * Club domestic league appearances and goals

Denis Aleksandrovich Popov (Russian: Денис Александрович Попов; born 4 February 1979) is a Russian football coach and former player.

== Career ==
He played for Russia national football team.

== Politics ==
In February 2010, he was involved into politics and was running for the Novorossiysk city council.
