= Veniamin Mandrykin =

Russian footballer (1981–2023)

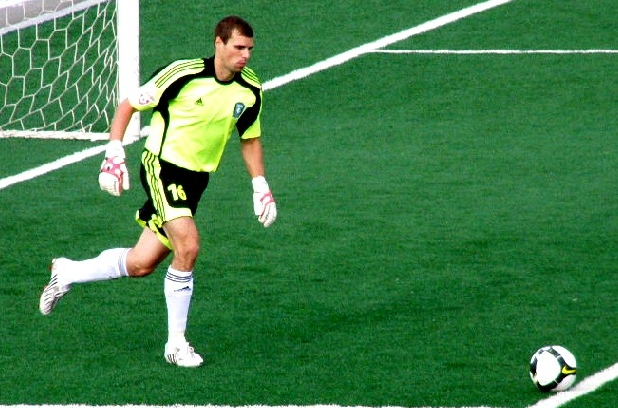
- Mandrykin with Tom Tomsk in 2008

Personal information
- Full name: Veniamin Anatolyevich Mandrykin
- Date of birth: 30 August 1981
- Place of birth: Orenburg, Russian SFSR, USSR
- Date of death: 6 August 2023 (aged 41)
- Place of death: Moscow, Russia
- Height: 1.88 m (6 ft 2 in)
- Position: Goalkeeper

Youth career
- Alania Vladikavkaz

Senior career*
| Years | Team | Apps | (Gls) |
| 1998–2002 | Alania Vladikavkaz | 46 | (0) |
| 2002–2010 | CSKA Moscow | 69 | (0) |
| 2008 | → Tom Tomsk (loan) | 21 | (0) |
| 2009 | → FC Rostov (loan) | 10 | (0) |
| 2010 | → Spartak Nalchik (loan) | 0 | (0) |
| 2010 | → Dynamo-Bryansk (loan) | 12 | (0) |

International career
| 2000–2002 | Russia U21 | 11 | (0) |
| 2003 | Russia | 2 | (0) |
- * Club domestic league appearances and goals

Veniamin Anatolyevich Mandrykin (Russian: Вениамин Анатольевич Мандрыкин; 30 August 1981 – 6 August 2023) was a Russian professional footballer who played as a goalkeeper.

== Club career ==
Mandrykin trained at the youth academy at Alania Vladikavkaz and in 1997 turned professional aged seventeen.

In 1998, he made his Russian Premier League debut and made 46 first-team appearances for Alania Vladikavkaz over the next three years before joining CSKA Moscow in 2002.

Mandrykin played for Spartak Nalchik in the Russian Cup.

== Injury ==
On 10 November 2010, he crashed his Porsche Cayenne SUV into a tree after trying to get away from a traffic police car in a high-speed chase. He suffered spinal fracture and injuries to his spinal cord. Two passengers in his car (two women, aged 19 and 20) received less serious injuries, breaking bones. Two of his Dynamo-Bryansk teammates who were also in the car, Maksim Fyodorov and Marat Magkeyev, received very minor injuries.

On 21 December 2010, he was charged with drunk driving leading to injuries in connection with the incident and faced up to 3 years of imprisonment.

As of July 2017, his legs were paralyzed and his hands had very minimal movement with no expectation of further recovery. Crash-related criminal charges were dropped by agreement with other people who were injured as passengers in his car.

== International career ==
Mandrykin represented the Russia national team at various youth divisions, playing in the 1998 UEFA European Under-18 Championship, and won 12 caps at the under-21 level.

Mandrykin made his first appearance for the Russia senior national team in February 2003 when Russia played Cyprus.

== Death ==
Veniamin Mandrykin died in Moscow on 6 August 2023, at the age of 41 due to complications of a heart attack.
