= Oleg Olegovich Malyukov =

Russian footballer and coach

Oleg Malyukov
Personal information
- Full name: Oleg Olegovich Malyukov
- Date of birth: 16 January 1985 (age 41)
- Place of birth: Omsk, Russian SFSR
- Height: 1.78 m (5 ft 10 in)
- Position: Defender

Youth career
- Hapoel Rishon LeZion
- PFC CSKA Moscow

Senior career*
Years	Team	Apps	(Gls)
2001–2007	PFC CSKA Moscow	0	(0)
2005	→ FC Khimki (loan)	16	(0)
2006	→ FC Spartak Nizhny Novgorod (loan)	12	(0)
2008	FC Sportakademklub Moscow	28	(2)
2009	FC Anzhi Makhachkala	2	(0)
2010	FC Kuban Krasnodar	11	(0)
2011	FC Salyut Belgorod	6	(1)
2012	FC Zenit Penza	4	(0)
2016	FC Energiya-KDYuSSh Shatura		
2017–2018	FC Odintsovo		

Managerial career
- 2012–2016: FC Dynamo Moscow (academy)
- * Club domestic league appearances and goals

Oleg Olegovich Malyukov (Russian: Олег Олегович Малюков; born 16 January 1985) is a Russian professional football coach and a former player.

== Club career ==
Despite being on the PFC CSKA Moscow roster for parts of 6 seasons, he only played for the senior team once, in a Russian Premier League Cup game against FC Zenit Saint Petersburg on 29 March 2003.

He played 5 seasons in the Russian Football National League for 5 different teams.

== Personal life ==
He is the son of Oleg Malyukov.
