= Vardan Mazalov =

Russian footballer

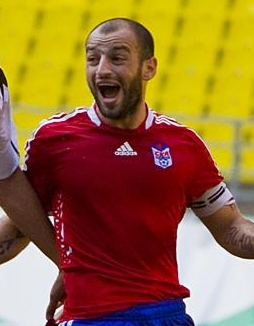

Personal information
- Full name: Vardan Aleksandrovich Mazalov
- Date of birth: 14 October 1983 (age 43)
- Place of birth: Samarkand, Soviet Union
- Height: 1.77 m (5 ft 10 in)
- Position: Forward

Senior career*
Years	Team	Apps	(Gls)
2001–2002	FC Lada Togliatti	22	(4)
2002	FC Vityaz Podolsk	1	(0)
2003–2005	PFC CSKA Moscow	1	(0)
2004	→ FC Anzhi Makhachkala (loan)	15	(2)
2004	→ FC Khimki (loan)	16	(1)
2005–2006	FC Spartak Nizhny Novgorod	54	(15)
2006	FC Salyut-Energia Belgorod	15	(2)
2007–2008	FC SKA Rostov-on-Don	63	(32)
2009	FC Anzhi Makhachkala	14	(4)
2011	FC SKA Rostov-on-Don	13	(2)
2012	FC SKA-Energiya Khabarovsk	0	(0)

International career
2004–2005	Russia U-21	7	(1)
- * Club domestic league appearances and goals

Vardan Mazalov (Russian: Вартан Александрович Мазалов; Armenian: Վարդան Մազալով; born on 14 October 1983) is a Russian former football forward.
