= Rolan Gusev =

Russian footballer

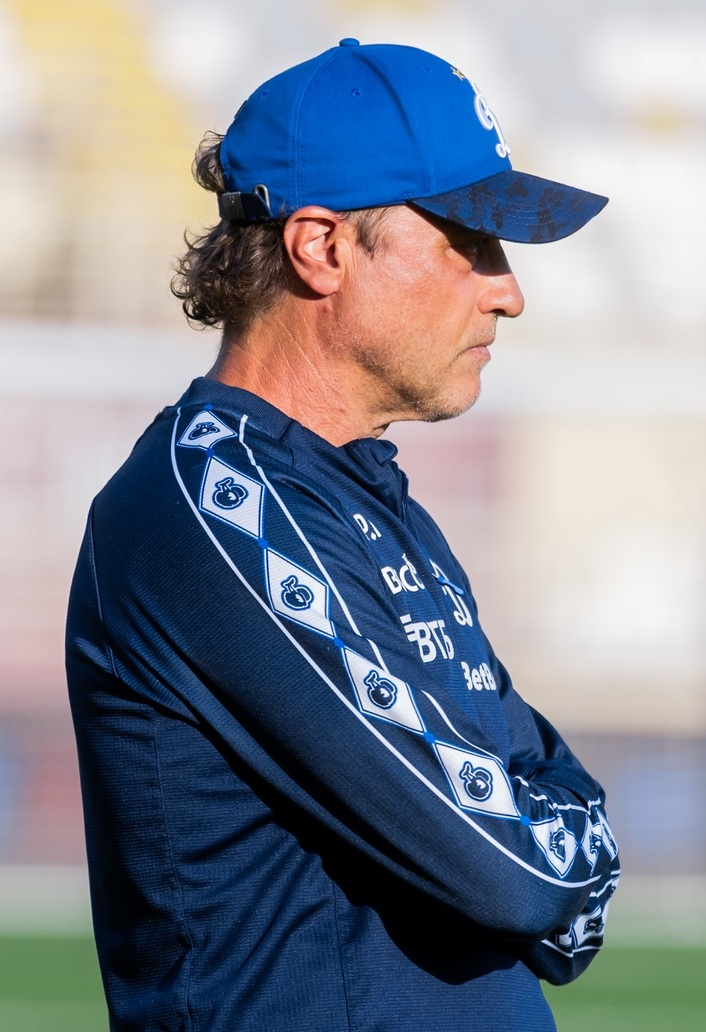
- Gusev as a manager of Dynamo Moscow in 2026

Personal information
- Full name: Rolan Aleksandrovich Gusev
- Date of birth: 17 September 1977 (age 49)
- Place of birth: Ashkhabad, Turkmen SSR, Soviet Union (now Ashgabat, Turkmenistan)
- Height: 1.80 m (5 ft 11 in)
- Position: Right midfielder

Team information
- Current team: Akhmat Grozny (manager)

Senior career*
Years	Team	Apps	(Gls)
1997–2001	Dynamo Moscow	127	(22)
2002–2008	CSKA Moscow	137	(33)
2008–2011	Dnipro Dnipropetrovsk	14	(0)
2009–2010	→ Arsenal Kyiv (loan)	39	(2)
2011	Arsenal Kyiv	9	(1)
Total		326	(58)

International career
1998–1999	Russia U21	10	(5)
2000–2005	Russia	31	(1)

Managerial career
- 2019–2020: CSKA Moscow (academy)
- 2020–2021: Russia U15
- 2021: Russia U16
- 2021–2023: CSKA Moscow (U19)
- 2023–2025: Dynamo Moscow (assistant)
- 2025: Dynamo Moscow (caretaker)
- 2025–2026: Dynamo Moscow
- 2026–: Akhmat Grozny
- * Club domestic league appearances and goals

Rolan Aleksandrovich Gusev (Russian: Ролан Александрович Гусев; born 17 September 1977) is a Russian professional football coach and a former player who played as a midfielder. He is the manager of Akhmat Grozny.

== Early life ==
Gusev was born on 17 September 1977 in Ashgabat, Turkmen Soviet Socialist Republic, Soviet Union but moved to Moscow at the age of 9. He attended the Dynamo Moscow football school.

== Club career ==
Gusev played for Dynamo Moscow since 1997 and transferred to the city rivals CSKA Moscow in 2002. With CSKA he won two Russian championships, two Russian Cups and the UEFA Cup. Gusev scored over 50 goals in his 200+ appearances in the Russian Premier League.

== International career ==
He played 2 matches for Russia at Euro 2004.

== Coaching career ==
In October 2021 it was announced that he was appointed to the management club of the Under-19 squad of CSKA Moscow. On 1 May 2025, Gusev was appointed caretaker manager of Dynamo Moscow until end of the season. On 17 November 2025, he was appointed Dynamo's caretaker manager once more, following the resignation of Valery Karpin. On 23 December 2025, he was confirmed as permanent manager for the rest of the 2025–26 season.

Dynamo started the spring part of the 2025–26 season with four wins (three in the league, including a 4–1 victory over CSKA Moscow and a 5–2 Russian Cup defeat of Spartak Moscow in the oldest Russian derby), and Gusev was chosen by the league as manager of the month for March 2026. He left Dynamo at the end of the season as Dynamo finished 7th in the league.

On 2 November 2026, Gusev was hired by Akhmat Grozny.

== Honors ==
=== Player ===
- UEFA Cup: 2005
- Russian Premier League: 2003, 2005, 2006
- Russian Premier League top scorer: 2002 (with Dmitri Kirichenko)
- Russian Cup: 2002, 2005, 2006
- Russian Super Cup: 2004, 2006, 2007
- Best right midfielder of the Russian Premier League according to Sport-Express: 2002, 2003, 2004, 2005

=== Manager ===
- Russian Premier League manager of the month: March 2026.
