= FC Yelets =

Russian football club

- Full name: Football Club Yelets
- Founded: 1968
- Ground: Trud
- Capacity: 8,800
- Chairman: Yuri Adonyev
- Manager: Yuri Adonyev
- League: Amateur Football League, Zone Chenozemye
- 2020: 3
Home colours	Away colours

FC Yelets (Russian: ФК «Елец») is a Russian football club from Yelets, founded in 1968. In 2009, it played in the Russian Second Division, which is the highest level it ever reached. In the past, the team was called Elta Yelets (1968–1969), Torpedo Yelets (1970–1994) and Lokomotiv Yelets (1995–1997).

FC Yelets, together with FC Fakel-Voronezh Voronezh were excluded from the Russian Second Division for attempts to bribe and threaten the referee on 18 July 2009. At the time of exclusion (21 August), Fakel were sixth with 31 points from 19 games, while Yelets were 16th with 9 points from 19 games.
