= 2002 PFC CSKA Moscow season =

CSKA
2002 season
- Manager: Valery Gazzaev
- Stadium: Dynamo Stadium; Eduard Streltsov Stadium
- Premier League: 2nd
- 2001–02 Russian Cup: Winners
- 2002–03 Russian Cup: Last 32 vs Dynamo St.Petersburg
- UEFA Cup: First round vs Parma
- Top goalscorer: League: Rolan Gusev; Dmitri Kirichenko (15 each); All: Rolan Gusev (16 goals)
Home colours	Away colours

The 2002 CSKA season was the club's eleventh season in the Russian Premier League, the highest tier of association football in Russia.

== Squad ==
As of match played 21 November 2002

Number	Name	Nationality	Position	Date of birth (age)	Signed from	Signed in	Contract ends	Apps.	Goals
Goalkeepers
1	Veniamin Mandrykin	(Russia)	GK	30 August 1981 (aged 21)	Alania Vladikavkaz	2001		30	0
30	Dmitry Kramarenko	(Azerbaijan)	GK	12 September 1974 (aged 28)	Dynamo Moscow	2002		3	0
35	Ruslan Nigmatullin	(Russia)	GK	7 October 1974 (aged 28)	loan from Hellas Verona	2002		18	0
Defenders
2	Deividas Šemberas	(Lithuania)	DF	2 August 1978 (aged 24)	Dynamo Moscow	2002		33	0
3	Andrei Solomatin	(Russia)	DF	9 September 1975 (aged 27)	Lokomotiv Moscow	2001		39	4
4	Yevgeni Varlamov	(Russia)	DF	25 July 1975 (aged 27)	KAMAZ	1998		97	11
6	Vyacheslav Dayev	(Russia)	DF	6 September 1972 (aged 30)	Torpedo Moscow	2002		25	1
15	Aleksei Berezutski	(Russia)	DF	20 June 1982 (aged 20)	Torpedo-ZIL Moscow	2001		19	0
23	Denis Yevsikov	(Russia)	DF	19 February 1981 (aged 21)	Academy	1999		70	0
24	Vasili Berezutski	(Russia)	DF	20 June 1982 (aged 20)	Torpedo-ZIL Moscow	2002		2	0
28	Bohdan Shershun	(Ukraine)	DF	20 June 1982 (aged 20)	Dnipro Dnipropetrovsk	2002		24	1
37	Oleg Malyukov	(Russia)	DF	16 January 1985 (aged 17)	Academy	2001		0	0
39	Ivan Taranov	(Russia)	DF	22 June 1986 (aged 16)	Chernomorets Novorossiysk	2002		0	0
49	Sergei Grichenkov	(Russia)	DF	8 July 1986 (aged 16)	Academy	2002		0	0
60	Yevgeni Klimov	(Russia)	DF	21 January 1985 (aged 17)	Academy	2002		0	0
	Ruslan Nakhushev	(Russia)	DF	5 September 1984 (aged 18)	Spartak Nalchik	2002		0	0
	Renat Yanbayev	(Russia)	DF	7 April 1984 (aged 18)	Academy	2001		0	0
Midfielders
5	Sergei Semak	(Russia)	MF	27 February 1976 (aged 26)	Asmaral Moscow	1994		260	67
7	Igor Yanovsky	(Russia)	MF	3 August 1974 (aged 28)	Paris Saint-Germain	2001		48	6
8	Rolan Gusev	(Russia)	MF	17 September 1977 (aged 25)	Dynamo Moscow	2002		36	16
18	Aleksandr Berketov	(Russia)	MF	24 December 1975 (aged 26)	Rotor Volgograd	2001		20	0
19	Juris Laizāns	(Latvia)	MF	6 January 1979 (aged 23)	Skonto Riga	2001		60	2
25	Elvir Rahimić	(Bosnia and Herzegovina)	MF	4 April 1976 (aged 26)	Anzhi Makhachkala	2001		49	0
27	Aleksei Triputen	(Russia)	MF	6 July 1982 (aged 20)	Torpedo-ZIL Moscow	2002		11	0
29	Artur Tlisov	(Russia)	MF	10 June 1982 (aged 20)	Chernomorets Novorossiysk	2002		3	0
Forwards
11	Spartak Gogniyev	(Russia)	FW	19 January 1981 (aged 21)	Dynamo Moscow	2001		37	6
13	Sergey Samodin	(Russia)	FW	14 February 1985 (aged 17)	Krasnodar-2000	2002		0	0
14	Dmitri Kirichenko	(Russia)	FW	17 January 1977 (aged 25)	Rostselmash	2002		28	15
17	Roman Monaryov	(Ukraine)	FW	17 January 1980 (aged 22)	CSKA Kyiv	2001		24	3
21	Denis Popov	(Russia)	FW	4 February 1979 (aged 23)	Chernomorets Novorossiysk	2001		51	13
Out on loan
22	Andrei Tsaplin	(Russia)	DF	22 January 1977 (aged 25)	Academy	1996		68	1
	Vladimir Kuzmichyov	(Russia)	MF	28 July 1979 (aged 23)	Dynamo Kyiv	2001		16	0
Left During the Season
12	Igor Piyuk	(Russia)	FW	13 May 1982 (aged 20)	Torpedo-ZIL Moscow	2002		2	1

== Transfers ==
=== Winter ===
In: Note: Flags indicate national team as defined under FIFA eligibility rules; some limited exceptions apply. Players may hold more than one non-FIFA nationality.

No.	Pos.	Nation	Player
2	DF	LTU	Deividas Šemberas (from (Russia) Dynamo Moscow)
6	DF	RUS	Vyacheslav Dayev (from (Russia) Torpedo Moscow)
8	MF	RUS	Rolan Gusev (from (Russia) Dynamo Moscow)
12	FW	RUS	Igor Piyuk (from (Russia) Torpedo-ZIL Moscow)
14	FW	RUS	Dmitri Kirichenko (from (Russia) Rostselmash)
24	DF	RUS	Vasili Berezutski (from (Russia) Torpedo-ZIL Moscow)
27	MF	RUS	Aleksei Triputen (from (Russia) Torpedo-ZIL Moscow)
28	DF	UKR	Bohdan Shershun (from (Ukraine) Dnipro Dnipropetrovsk)
29	MF	RUS	Artur Tlisov (from (Russia) Chernomorets Novorossiysk)
30	GK	AZE	Dmitry Kramarenko (from (Russia) Dynamo Moscow)

Out: Note: Flags indicate national team as defined under FIFA eligibility rules; some limited exceptions apply. Players may hold more than one non-FIFA nationality.

No.	Pos.	Nation	Player
4	DF	RUS	Maksim Bokov (to (Russia) Uralan Elista)
6	DF	RUS	Oleg Kornaukhov (to (Russia) Torpedo-ZIL Moscow)
9	FW	YUG	Predrag Ranđelović (to (Russia) Zenit St.Petersburg)
10	FW	RUS	Vladimir Kulik
11	MF	RUS	Sergei Filippenkov (to (Russia) Chernomorets Novorossiysk)
12	MF	RUS	Vladimir Kuzmichyov (loan to (Russia) Torpedo Moscow)
15	MF	UZB	Davron Fayziev (to (Russia) Alania Vladikavkaz)
17	MF	RUS	Stanislav Lysenko (to (Russia) Kuban Krasnodar)
18	DF	RUS	Valeri Minko (to (Russia) Kuban Krasnodar)
22	MF	RUS	Aleksei Savelyev (to (Russia) Anzhi Makhachkala)
—	MF	RUS	Sergei Rodin (to (Russia) Kuban Krasnodar)

=== Summer ===
In: Note: Flags indicate national team as defined under FIFA eligibility rules; some limited exceptions apply. Players may hold more than one non-FIFA nationality.

No.	Pos.	Nation	Player
35	GK	RUS	Ruslan Nigmatullin (loan from (Italy) Hellas Verona)

Out: Note: Flags indicate national team as defined under FIFA eligibility rules; some limited exceptions apply. Players may hold more than one non-FIFA nationality.

No.	Pos.	Nation	Player
12	FW	RUS	Igor Piyuk (to (Russia) Torpedo-ZIL Moscow)
22	DF	RUS	Andrei Tsaplin (loan to (Russia) Torpedo-ZIL Moscow)

== Competitions ==
=== Premier League ===
==== Results by round ====
Round	1	2	3	4	5	6	7	8	9	10	11	12	13	14	15	16	17	18	19	20	21	22	23	24	25	26	27	28	29	30
Ground	H	A	H	A	H	A	H	A	H	A	A	H	A	H	A	H	A	H	A	A	H	H	H	A	H	A	H	A	H	A
Result	W	W	W	W	W	D	L	W	W	L	W	W	D	W	D	L	W	W	L	W	W	L	L	W	W	W	W	W	W	W

Updated to match(es) played on 17 November 2002. Source: See Results
A = Away; H = Home; W = Win; D = Draw; L = Loss

==== Results ====
9 March 2002 1	CSKA Moscow	4 – 0	Torpedo-ZIL Moscow	Moscow
16:00 MSK (UTC+3)	Semak (red card) 25'; Kirichenko (yellow card) 53' (goal) 55', 73', 77'; Gusev 59'; Rahimić (yellow card) 80'	Report	Musatov (yellow card) 3' (yellow-red card) 42'; Curteian (red card) 25'; Kulichenko (yellow card) 27'; Lakić (yellow card) 74'	Stadium: Eduard Streltsov Stadium; Referee: Yuri Baskakov

13 March 2002 2	Sokol Saratov	0 – 1	CSKA Moscow	Saratov
19:00 MSK (UTC+3)	Kosolapov (yellow card) 18'; Orbu (yellow card) 63'	Report	Popov 45'; Solomatin (yellow card) 74'; Gogniyev (yellow card) 90'	Stadium: Lokomotiv Stadium; Referee: Yu.Chebotarev

17 March 2002 3	CSKA Moscow	1 – 0	Zenit St.Petersburg	Moscow
15:00 MSK (UTC+3)	Laizāns (yellow card) 42'; Kirichenko (yellow card) 57'; Gusev 89'	Report	Mudrinić (yellow card) 38'; Hovsepyan (yellow card) 66'; Vještica (yellow card) 70'	Stadium: Eduard Streltsov Stadium; Referee: Stanislav Sukhina

23 March 2002 4	Dynamo Moscow	0 – 2	CSKA Moscow	Moscow
16:00 MSK (UTC+3)	Covalenco (yellow card) 41'; Kobelev (yellow card) 74'; Yashin (yellow card) 81'; Dyatel (red card) 90'	Report	Popov 4', 87' (yellow card) 45'; Rahimić (yellow card) 17'; Laizāns (penalty missed) 70'	Stadium: Dynamo Stadium; Referee: S.Zuev

30 March 2002 5	CSKA Moscow	1 – 0	Alania Vladikavkaz	Moscow
15:00 MSK (UTC+4)	Rahimić 78'	Report	Paukov (yellow card) 36'; Grigore (yellow card) 76'	Stadium: Eduard Streltsov Stadium; Referee: Nikolai Ivanov

7 April 2002 6	Uralan Elista	3 – 3	CSKA Moscow	Elista
18:00 MSK (UTC+4)	Avakov (yellow card) 12' (goal) 40', 87'; Semochko (yellow card) 20'; Tsiklauri 31'; Chugainov (yellow card) 76'	Report	Dayev (yellow card) 18'; Solomatin 23'; Semak (yellow card) 23'; Gusev 27' (pen.); Kirichenko 88'; Yevsikov (yellow card) 88'	Stadium: Uralan Stadium; Referee: Taras Bezubyak

13 April 2002 7	CSKA Moscow	2 – 3	Saturn-REN TV	Moscow
16:00 MSK (UTC+4)	Rahimić (yellow card) 14'; Yanovsky 20'; Semak 59'	Report	Bystrov (yellow card) 12' (goal) 78'; Rebeja (yellow card) 19'; Rogaciov 22'; Sosnovschi (yellow card) 49'; Movsisyan 87'	Stadium: Eduard Streltsov Stadium; Referee: Yu.Chebotarev

21 April 2002 8	Spartak Moscow	0 – 3	CSKA Moscow	Moscow
17:00 MSK (UTC+4)		Report	Solomatin 11'; Gusev 41' (pen.) (yellow card) 42'; Laizāns 53'; Rahimić (yellow card) 89'	Stadium: Luzhniki Stadium; Referee: Valentin Ivanov

29 April 2002 9	CSKA Moscow	2 – 0	Rotor Volgograd	Moscow
19:00 MSK (UTC+4)	Solomatin (yellow card) 25'; Gusev 28'; Yevsikov (yellow card) 42'; Rahimić (yellow card) 67'; Yanovsky 77'	Report	Rashevsky (yellow card) 23'; Olenikov (yellow card) 30'; Radkevich (yellow card) 44'; Aldonin (yellow card) 75'	Stadium: Eduard Streltsov Stadium; Referee: Sergei Fursa

4 May 2002 10	Anzhi Makhachkala	2 – 1	CSKA Moscow	Makhachkala
18:00 MSK (UTC+4)	Mzhavanadze 21'; Tsymbalar 33'; Hošić (yellow card) 51'; Agalarov (yellow card) 86'; Akayev (yellow card) 90'	Report	Semak (yellow card) 10'; Gusev (yellow card) 13'; Laizāns (yellow card) 35'; Yevsikov (yellow card) 52'; Popov (yellow card) 69'; Dayev 75'; Šemberas (yellow card) 79'	Stadium: Dynamo Stadium; Referee: Stanislav Sukhina

8 May 2002 11	Torpedo Moscow	2 – 3	CSKA Moscow	Moscow
19:00 MSK (UTC+4)	Kormiltsev (yellow card) 28'; Semshov 42' (yellow card) 73'; Sarkisyan (yellow card) 56'; Cherevchenko (yellow card) 71'; Leonchenko 76' (pen.); Jolović (yellow card) 83'	Report	Kirichenko 33'; Semak 73', 84' (pen.) (yellow card) 74'	Stadium: Luzhniki Stadium; Referee: Valentin Ivanov

1 July 2002 13	CSKA Moscow	2 – 0	Shinnik Yaroslavl	Moscow
19:00 MSK (UTC+4)	Gusev 53' (pen.); Monaryov (yellow card) 81'; Kirichenko 89'	Report	Gerasimenko (yellow card) 43'	Stadium: Eduard Streltsov Stadium; Referee: A.Tyumin

9 July 2002 14	Lokomotiv Moscow	0 – 0	CSKA Moscow	Moscow
MSK (UTC+4)	Maminov (yellow card) 4'; Nizhegorodov (yellow card) 39'; Evseev (yellow card) 44'; Lekgetho (yellow card) 86'	Report	Šemberas (yellow card) 40'; Yevsikov (yellow card) 54'; Popov (yellow card) 66'	Stadium: Lokomotiv Stadium; Referee: Taras Bezubyak

17 July 2002 15	CSKA Moscow	2 – 0	Krylia Sovetov	Moscow
19:00 MSK (UTC+4)	Rahimić (yellow card) 35'; Kirichenko 52'; Gusev 66'; Dayev (yellow card) 83'	Report	Radimov (yellow card) 8'; Shuneyka (yellow card) 50'; Poškus (yellow card) 77'; Karyaka (yellow card) 78'	Stadium: Eduard Streltsov Stadium; Referee: Nikolai Ivanov

23 July 2002 16	Shinnik Yaroslavl	1 – 1	CSKA Moscow	Yaroslavl
18:00 MSK (UTC+4)	Skokov (yellow card) 18' (goal) 72'; Fuzailov (yellow card) 30'	Report	Popov (yellow card) 3'; Gusev 31'; Šemberas (yellow card) 76'	Stadium: Shinnik Stadium; Referee: Sergei Fursa

28 July 2002 17	CSKA Moscow	0 – 1	Lokomotiv Moscow	Moscow
16:00 MSK (UTC+4)	Semak (yellow card) 13'; Yevsikov (yellow card) 25'; Solomatin (yellow card) 35'; Laizāns (yellow card) 90'; Kirichenko (yellow card) 90'	Report	Obiorah (yellow card) 17'; Maminov (yellow card) 37'; Lekgetho (yellow card) 45'; Loskov 57'; Nizhegorodov (yellow card) 69'; Pimenov (red card) 77'	Stadium: Eduard Streltsov Stadium; Referee: Yuri Baskakov

3 August 2002 18	Krylia Sovetov	0 – 2	CSKA Moscow	Samara
19:00 MSK (UTC+4)	Radimov (yellow card) 37'; Dokhoyan (yellow card) 75'	Report	Gusev 9' (yellow card) 82'; Popov 10'; Rahimić (yellow card) 15'; Laizāns (yellow card) 70'	Stadium: Metallurg Stadium; Referee: I.Yegorov

9 August 2002 19	CSKA Moscow	5 – 1	Rostselmash	Moscow
19:00 MSK (UTC+4)	Kirichenko 9', 45', 75'; Laizāns 61'; Rahimić (yellow card) 72'; Gogniyev 90'	Report	Fomenka 20'	Stadium: Eduard Streltsov Stadium; Referee: Sergey Lapochkin

13 August 2002 12	Rostselmash	3 – 2	CSKA Moscow	Rostov-on-Don
19:00 MSK (UTC+4)	Malygin (yellow card) 21'; Popov 35' (o.g.); Fomenka 42'; Osinov (yellow card) 52' (yellow-red card) 70'; Datsenko (yellow card) 53'; Akopyants (yellow card) 55'; Maslov 85' (pen.)	Report	Kirichenko 22' (pen.), 90' (pen.); Šemberas (yellow card) 28' (yellow-red card) 76'; Yevsikov (yellow card) 55'; Solomatin (yellow card) 80'	Stadium: Olimp-2; Referee: I.Yegorov

17 August 2002 20	Rotor Volgograd	0 – 1	CSKA Moscow	Volgograd
16:00 MSK (UTC+4)	Aldonin (yellow card) 13'; Yesipov (yellow card) 39'	Report	Gusev 14'; Yevsikov (yellow card) 45'; A.Berezutski (yellow card) 64'	Stadium: Central Profsoyuz Stadium; Referee: Sergey Lapochkin

25 August 2002 21	CSKA Moscow	3 – 1	Anzhi Makhachkala	Moscow
17:00 MSK (UTC+4)	Laizāns (yellow card) 5'; Popov 26'; Kirichenko (yellow card) 41'; Semak 59'; Gusev 67'; Dayev (yellow card) 90'	Report	Glogovac (yellow card) 29'; Mzhavanadze (yellow card) 31'; Aksyonov 39'; Babych (yellow card) 52'; Hošić (yellow card) 65'; Willer (yellow card) 82'	Stadium: Eduard Streltsov Stadium; Referee: V.Vlasov

1 September 2002 22	CSKA Moscow	2 – 3	Torpedo Moscow	Moscow
17:00 MSK (UTC+4)	Rahimić (yellow card) 25' (goal) 69'; Gusev 63'	Report	Semshov 9'; Shirko 32' (yellow card) 71'; Leonchenko 56'; Sajaia (yellow card) 90'	Stadium: Eduard Streltsov Stadium; Referee: Valery Shaveyko

11 September 2002 23	CSKA Moscow	2 – 3	Dynamo Moscow	Moscow
17:00 MSK (UTC+4)	Gusev (yellow card) 22' (goal) 65'; Yevsikov (yellow card) 30'; Yanovsky (yellow card) 42'; Semak (yellow card) 44'; Gogniyev (yellow card) 52' (goal) 89'; Šemberas (yellow card) 66' (yellow-red card) 75'	Report	Panov 6'; Kharlachyov 30' (pen.) (yellow card) 41' (yellow-red card) 55'; Dyatel (yellow card) 43'; Covalenco (yellow card) 52'; Koroman (penalty missed) 68' 68'; Tochilin (yellow card) 70' (yellow-red card) 80'	Stadium: Eduard Streltsov Stadium; Referee: Yuri Baskakov

23 September 2002 24	Torpedo-ZIL Moscow	0 – 2	CSKA Moscow	Moscow
18:00 MSK (UTC+4)	Kornaukhov (yellow card) 9'; Rizvić (yellow card) 63'; Tsaplin (yellow card) 68'	Report	Semak 8'; Gusev (yellow card) 9'; Kirichenko 16'	Stadium: Eduard Streltsov Stadium; Referee: M.Khodyrev

28 September 2002 25	CSKA Moscow	3 – 0	Sokol Saratov	Moscow
16:00 MSK (UTC+4)	Popov 39', 67', 75'	Report	Valadzyankow (yellow card) 88' (yellow-red card) 90'	Stadium: Eduard Streltsov Stadium; Referee: Aleksandr Gvardis

6 October 2002 26	Zenit St.Petersburg	0 – 2	CSKA Moscow	Saint Petersburg
16:00 MSK (UTC+4)	Arshavin (yellow card) 57' (yellow-red card) 65'	Report	Yevsikov (yellow card) 38'; Semak (yellow card) 45' (yellow-red card) 55'; Shershun (yellow card) 53' (goal) 66'; Solomatin (yellow card) 58'; Yanovsky 75'	Stadium: Petrovsky Stadium; Referee: I.Yegorov

27 October 2002 27	CSKA Moscow	2 – 1	Uralan Elista	Elista
16:00 MSK (UTC+3)	Gusev 14' (pen.); Laizāns (yellow card) 15'; Kirichenko 34'; Šemberas (yellow card) 79'; Gogniyev (yellow card) 88'	Report	Semochko 2' (yellow card) 64' (yellow-red card) 79'; Kuzmin (yellow card) 44'; Ospeshinskiy (yellow card) 55'	Stadium: Uralan Stadium; Referee: A.Evstigneev

2 November 2002 28	Alania Vladikavkaz	0 – 1	CSKA Moscow	Vladikavkaz
16:00 MSK (UTC+3)	Demetradze (yellow card) 28'	Report	Solomatin 10'; Kirichenko (yellow card) 30'; Yevsikov (yellow card) 41'	Stadium: Republican Spartak Stadium; Referee: Yu.Chebotarev

9 November 2002 29	CSKA Moscow	2 – 1	Spartak Moscow	Moscow
16:00 MSK (UTC+3)	Solomatin (yellow card) 10'; Semak 34'; Yanovsky (yellow card) 38' (goal) 62'; Yevsikov (yellow card) 75'; Laizāns (yellow card) 87'	Report	Kalynychenko (yellow card) 6' (yellow-red card) 41'; Bezrodny (yellow card) 54'; Danishevsky (yellow card) 57'; Kudryashov 69'; Pinheiro (yellow card) 85'; Ogunsania (yellow card) 88'	Stadium: Eduard Streltsov Stadium; Referee: Nikolai Ivanov

17 November 2002 30	Saturn-REN TV	0 – 3	CSKA Moscow	Ramenskoye
16:00 MSK (UTC+3)	Melyoshin (yellow card) 34'; Joldić (yellow card) 41'; Amoako (yellow card) 53'	Report	Rahimić (yellow card) 17'; Popov (yellow card) 44'; Solomatin (yellow card) 45'; Laizāns 46'; Gusev 59'; Kirichenko 90'	Stadium: Saturn Stadium; Referee: I.Yegorov

==== Table ====
Pos	Team	Pld	W	D	L	GF	GA	GD	Pts	Qualification or relegation
1	Lokomotiv Moscow (C)	30	19	9	2	46	14	+32	66	Qualification to Champions League third qualifying round (Note: The title was decided in a championship playoff as Lokomotiv Moscow and CSKA Moscow finished with equal points.)
2	CSKA Moscow	30	21	3	6	60	26	+34	66	Qualification to Champions League second qualifying round
3	Spartak Moscow	30	16	7	7	49	36	+13	55	Qualification to UEFA Cup first round
4	Torpedo Moscow (Note: Torpedo qualified for the UEFA Cup thanks to Spartak winning the Russian Cup in 2003.)	30	14	8	8	47	32	+15	50	Qualification to UEFA Cup qualifying round
5	Krylia Sovetov Samara	30	15	4	11	39	32	+7	49	

Source: RFPL
Rules for classification: 1) points; 2) goal difference; 3) number of goals scored.
(C) Champions

==== Championship playoff ====
21 November 2002	CSKA Moscow	0 – 1	Lokomotiv Moscow	Moscow
18:00 MSK (UTC+3)	Laizāns (yellow card) 6'; Yanovsky (yellow card) 44'; Solomatin (yellow card) 60'	Report	Loskov 6' (yellow card) 54'; Lekgetho (yellow card) 26'; Nizhegorodov (yellow card) 47'	Stadium: Dynamo Stadium; Referee: Valentin Ivanov

=== Russian Cup ===
==== 2001–02 ====
3 April 2002 Quarterfinal	Torpedo-ZIL Moscow	0 – 1	CSKA Moscow	Moscow
18:00 MSK (UTC+4)		Report	Laizāns (yellow card) 13'; Piyuk 19'; Solomatin (yellow card) 73'	Stadium: Eduard Streltsov Stadium; Referee: M.Veselovsky

25 April 2002 Semifinal	CSKA Moscow	1 – 0	Amkar Perm	Moscow
18:00 MSK (UTC+4)	Popov (yellow card) 29'; Semak 60'; Laizāns (yellow card) 90'	Report	Bakhtin (yellow card) 21'	Stadium: Eduard Streltsov Stadium; Referee: Nikolai Ivanov

12 May 2002 Final	CSKA Moscow	2 – 0	Zenit St.Petersburg	Moscow
16:00 MSK (UTC+4)	Solomatin 30' (yellow card) 71'; Yanovsky 52'; Laizāns (yellow card) 76'; Gusev (yellow card) 88'	Report	Astafyev (yellow card) 28'; Katulsky (yellow card) 51'; Tarasov (yellow card) 85'	Stadium: Luzhniki Stadium; Referee: Yu.Chebotarev

==== 2002–03 ====
14 September 2002 Last 32	Dynamo St.Petersburg	3 – 2 (a.e.t.)	CSKA Moscow	Saint Petersburg
16:00 MSK (UTC+4)	Oreshchuk 28' (yellow card) 79'; Žvingilas 55'; Lavrik 99'	Report	Semak 11'; Gusev 15' (yellow card) 50'; Yanovsky (yellow card) 38'; Shershun (yellow card) 45' (yellow-red card) 78'; Kirichenko (yellow card) 58'	Stadium: Petrovsky Stadium; Referee: Yuri Klyuchnikov

=== UEFA Cup ===
19 September 2002 First round 1st leg	CSKA Moscow (Russia)	1–1	(Italy) Parma	Ramenskoye, Moscow
20:30 MSK (UTC+4)	Berezutski (yellow card) 54'; Popov 67'	Report	Filippini (yellow card) 44'; Bonera (yellow card) 45'; Mutu 53'	Stadium: Saturn Stadium; Referee: Georgios Kasnaferis (Greece)

3 October 2002 First round 2nd Leg	Parma (Italy)	3–2 (4–3 agg.)	(Russia) CSKA Moscow	Parma, Italy
23:00 MSK (UTC+4)	Adriano 8'; Ferrari (yellow card) 25'; Filippini (yellow card) 53'; Mutu 66', 90'	Report	Yanovsky (yellow card) 23'; Rahimić (yellow card) 26'; Semak 37', 43'; Solomatin (yellow card) 46'; Berezutski (yellow card) 54'; Nigmatullin (yellow card) 85'	Stadium: Stadio Ennio Tardini; Referee: Uriah Rennie (England)

== Squad statistics ==
As of match played 21 November 2002

=== Appearances and goals ===
No.	Pos	Nat	Player	Total		Premier League		Championship Playoff		2001–02 Russian Cup		2002–03 Russian Cup		UEFA Cup	
No.	Pos	Nat	Player	Apps	Goals	Apps	Goals	Apps	Goals	Apps	Goals	Apps	Goals	Apps	Goals
1	GK	(Russia) RUS	Veniamin Mandrykin	13	0	13	0	0	0	0	0	0	0	0	0
2	DF	(Lithuania) LTU	Deividas Šemberas	33	0	24+4	0	0	0	3	0	0	0	2	0
3	DF	(Russia) RUS	Andrei Solomatin	32	4	20+5	3	1	0	3	1	1	0	2	0
4	DF	(Russia) RUS	Yevgeni Varlamov	3	0	0+2	0	0	0	0	0	0+1	0	0	0
5	MF	(Russia) RUS	Sergei Semak	29	10	23	6	1	0	2	1	1	1	2	2
6	DF	(Russia) RUS	Vyacheslav Dayev	25	1	22	1	0	0	1	0	1	0	0+1	0
7	MF	(Russia) RUS	Igor Yanovsky	34	5	28	4	1	0	2	1	1	0	2	0
8	MF	(Russia) RUS	Rolan Gusev	36	16	29	15	1	0	3	0	1	1	2	0
11	FW	(Russia) RUS	Spartak Gogniyev	21	1	9+9	1	0+1	0	1	0	0+1	0	0	0
14	FW	(Russia) RUS	Dmitri Kirichenko	28	15	17+7	15	0+1	0	0+1	0	1	0	0+1	0
15	DF	(Russia) RUS	Aleksei Berezutski	19	0	14+1	0	1	0	0	0	1	0	2	0
17	FW	(Ukraine) UKR	Roman Monaryov	13	0	0+12	0	0	0	0+1	0	0	0	0	0
18	MF	(Russia) RUS	Aleksandr Berketov	10	0	0+7	0	0	0	1	0	0+1	0	0+1	0
19	MF	(Latvia) LAT	Juris Laizāns	32	2	23+2	2	1	0	3	0	1	0	1+1	0
21	FW	(Russia) RUS	Denis Popov	33	9	27	8	1	0	3	0	0	0	2	1
23	DF	(Russia) RUS	Denis Yevsikov	33	0	26+2	0	1	0	3	0	0	0	1	0
24	DF	(Russia) RUS	Vasili Berezutski	2	0	0+2	0	0	0	0	0	0	0	0	0
25	MF	(Bosnia and Herzegovina) BIH	Elvir Rahimić	35	0	29	0	1	0	2	0	1	0	2	0
27	MF	(Russia) RUS	Aleksei Triputen	11	0	2+7	0	0	0	0+2	0	0	0	0	0
28	DF	(Ukraine) UKR	Bohdan Shershun	24	1	8+9	1	1	0	2+1	0	1	0	2	0
29	MF	(Russia) RUS	Artur Tlisov	3	0	0+3	0	0	0	0	0	0	0	0	0
30	GK	(Azerbaijan) AZE	Dmitry Kramarenko	3	0	3	0	0	0	0	0	0	0	0	0
35	GK	(Russia) RUS	Ruslan Nigmatullin	18	0	14	0	1	0	0	0	1	0	2	0
Players out on loan:
22	DF	(Russia) RUS	Andrei Tsaplin	1	0	0	0	0	0	0+1	0	0	0	0	0
Players who left CSKA Moscow during the season:
12	FW	(Russia) RUS	Igor Piyuk	2	1	0+1	0	0	0	1	1	0	0	0	0

=== Goal scorers ===
Place	Position	Nation	Number	Name	Premier League	Championship Playoff	2001–02 Russian Cup	2002–03 Russian Cup	UEFA Cup	Total
1	MF	(Russia)	8	Rolan Gusev	15	0	0	1	0	16
2	FW	(Russia)	14	Dmitri Kirichenko	15	0	0	0	0	15
3	MF	(Russia)	5	Sergei Semak	6	0	1	1	2	10
4	FW	(Russia)	21	Denis Popov	8	0	0	0	1	9
5	MF	(Russia)	7	Igor Yanovsky	4	0	1	0	0	5
6	DF	(Russia)	3	Andrei Solomatin	3	0	1	0	0	4
6				Own goal	4	0	0	0	0	4
8	MF	(Latvia)	19	Juris Laizāns	2	0	0	0	0	2
9	FW	(Russia)	11	Spartak Gogniyev	1	0	0	0	0	1
9	DF	(Russia)	6	Vyacheslav Dayev	1	0	0	0	0	1
9	DF	(Ukraine)	28	Bohdan Shershun	1	0	0	0	0	1
9	FW	(Russia)	12	Igor Piyuk	0	0	1	0	0	1
				TOTALS	60	0	4	2	3	69

=== Disciplinary record ===
Number	Nation	Position	Name	Premier League		Championship Playoff		2001–02 Russian Cup		2002–03 Russian Cup		UEFA Cup		Total	
Number	Nation	Position	Name	Booked	Sent off (straight red)	Booked	Sent off (straight red)	Booked	Sent off (straight red)	Booked	Sent off (straight red)	Booked	Sent off (straight red)	Booked	Sent off (straight red)
2	(Lithuania)	DF	Deividas Šemberas	8	2	0	0	0	0	0	0	0	0	8	2
3	(Russia)	DF	Andrei Solomatin	8	0	1	0	2	0	0	0	1	0	12	0
5	(Russia)	MF	Sergei Semak	7	2	0	0	0	0	0	0	0	0	7	2
6	(Russia)	DF	Vyacheslav Dayev	3	0	0	0	0	0	0	0	0	0	3	0
7	(Russia)	MF	Igor Yanovsky	3	0	1	0	0	0	1	0	1	0	6	0
8	(Russia)	MF	Rolan Gusev	5	0	0	0	1	0	1	0	0	0	7	0
11	(Russia)	FW	Spartak Gogniyev	3	0	0	0	0	0	0	0	0	0	3	0
14	(Russia)	FW	Dmitri Kirichenko	5	0	0	0	0	0	1	0	0	0	6	0
15	(Russia)	DF	Aleksei Berezutski	1	0	0	0	0	0	0	0	2	0	3	0
17	(Ukraine)	FW	Roman Monaryov	1	0	0	0	0	0	0	0	0	0	1	0
19	(Latvia)	MF	Juris Laizāns	8	0	1	0	3	0	0	0	0	0	12	0
21	(Russia)	FW	Denis Popov	5	0	0	0	1	0	0	0	0	0	6	0
23	(Russia)	DF	Denis Yevsikov	11	0	0	0	0	0	0	0	0	0	11	0
25	(Bosnia and Herzegovina)	MF	Elvir Rahimić	10	0	0	0	0	0	0	0	1	0	11	0
28	(Ukraine)	DF	Bohdan Shershun	1	0	0	0	0	0	2	1	0	0	3	1
35	(Russia)	GK	Ruslan Nigmatullin	0	0	0	0	0	0	0	0	1	0	1	0
Players out on loan :
Players who left CSKA Moscow during the season:
			TOTALS	77	4	3	0	7	0	5	1	6	0	98	5
