= Aleksandr Kovalyov =

Aleksandr Kovalyov may refer to:

- Aleksandr Kovalyov (politician) (1942–2024), Russia/Soviet politician
- Aleksandr Gennadyevich Kovalyov (1973–1999), Russian Army officer and Hero of the Russian Federation
- Aleksandr Kovalyov (footballer, born 1980) (1980–2005), Russian footballer
- Aleksandr Petrovich Kovalyov (born 1950), Russian football manager
- Aleksandr Sergeyevich Kovalyov (born 1982), Russian footballer
- Aleksandr Vladimirovich Kovalyov (born 1975), Russian sprint canoer
- Aleksandr Alexandrovich Kovalyov (born 1986), Uzbekistani footballer
