= Aleksandr Kovalyov (footballer, born 1980) =

Russian footballer

Personal information
- Full name: Aleksandr Yevgenyevich Kovalyov
- Date of birth: 13 May 1980
- Place of birth: Moscow, Russian SFSR
- Date of death: 13 July 2005 (aged 25)
- Place of death: Bryansk Oblast, Russia
- Height: 1.82 m (5 ft 11 1/2 in)
- Position: Defender

Youth career
- FC Torpedo-ZIL Moscow

Senior career*
Years	Team	Apps	(Gls)
1998–2000	FC Torpedo-ZIL-M Moscow		
2001–2003	FC Torpedo-Metallurg Moscow	36	(0)
2004	SK Torpedo Moscow		
2004	FC Lada Togliatti	11	(1)
2005	FC Torpedo-RG (amateur)		
- * Club domestic league appearances and goals

Aleksandr Yevgenyevich Kovalyov (Russian: Александр Евгеньевич Ковалёв; 13 May 1980, in Moscow – 13 July 2005, in Bryansk Oblast) was a Russian football player.

Kovalyov played in the Russian Premier League with FC Torpedo-ZIL Moscow.

Kovalyov was returning to Moscow after watching a Russian Cup match between FC Dynamo Bryansk and FC Dynamo Moscow with Bryansk player Aleksei Musatov in July 2005. Both footballers were killed in a traffic accident caused by a moose running onto the road.
