= Dmitri Kirichenko =

Russian footballer and manager

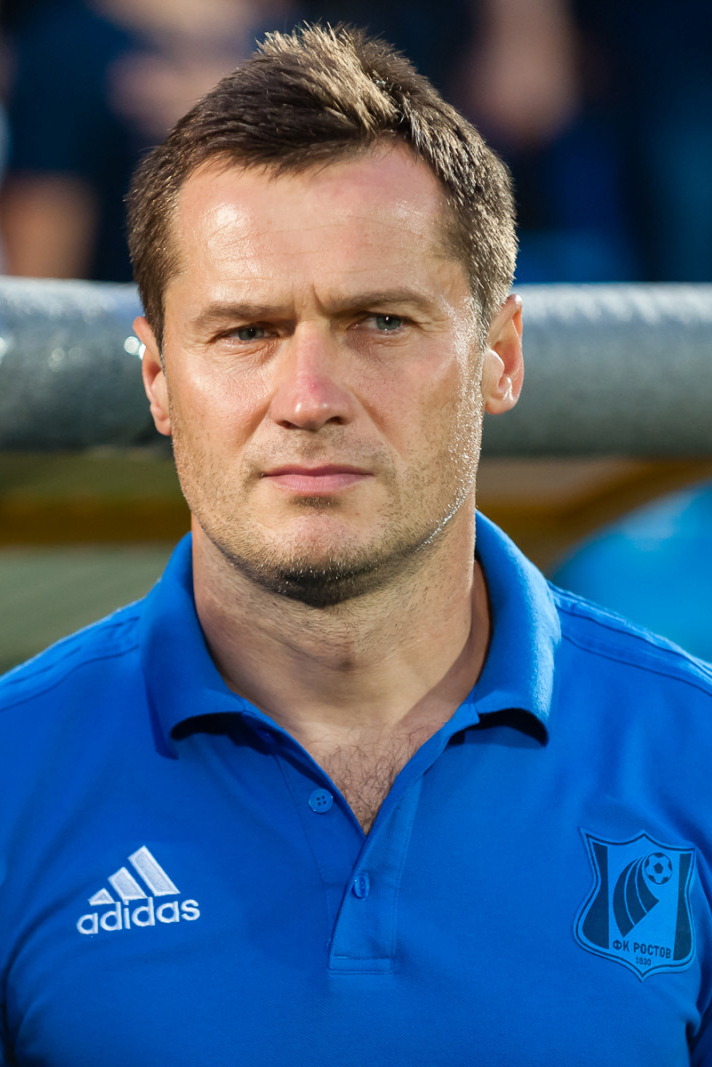
- Kirichenko managing Rostov in 2017

Personal information
- Full name: Dmitri Sergeyevich Kirichenko
- Date of birth: 17 January 1977 (age 49)
- Place of birth: Novoalexandrovsk, Soviet Union
- Height: 1.75 m (5 ft 9 in)
- Position: Striker

Team information
- Current team: Rostov (manager)

Senior career*
Years	Team	Apps	(Gls)
1994	Lokomotiv Mineralnye Vody	24	(0)
1995	Iskra Novoaleksandrovsk	16	(9)
1996–1997	Taganrog	73	(39)
1998–2001	Rostselmash	108	(38)
2002–2005	CSKA Moscow	74	(29)
2005–2006	Moscow	55	(26)
2007–2010	Saturn Ramenskoye	99	(26)
2011–2013	Rostov	44	(10)
2013	Mordovia Saransk	12	(1)
Total		505	(178)

International career
1998	Russia U-21	1	(0)
2003–2006	Russia	12	(4)

Managerial career
- 2014–2017: Rostov (assistant)
- 2016: Rostov (caretaker)
- 2017: Rostov (caretaker)
- 2018: Ufa (assistant)
- 2018–2019: Ufa
- 2022: Tractor (assistant)
- 2022–2023: Sochi (assistant)
- 2024–2026: Tekstilshchik Ivanovo
- 2026–: Rostov
- * Club domestic league appearances and goals

Dmitri Sergeyevich Kirichenko (Russian: Дмитрий Сергеевич Кириченко; born 17 January 1977) is a Russian football coach and a former player who played as a striker. He is the manger of Russian Premier League club Rostov.

As of 10 March 2014, he is the 3rd all-time top scorer in the Russian Premier League (129 goals), and the 5th player by league appearances (377).

== Club career ==
Kirichenko started his career playing for small clubs such as Lokomotiv Mineralnye Vody, Iskra Novoaleksandrovsk and Torpedo Taganrog. In 1998, he joined Rostselmash, following impressive performance for Taganrog club during the previous year.

He became one of the most promising Russian strikers during the next years, and joined CSKA Moscow in 2002. With the army men Kirichenko managed to become the league top scorer in 2002 (along with his teammate Rolan Gusev), won the Russian Premier League twice, and got the Russian Cup.

In 2005, he left for FC Moscow. Playing for the new team, he repeated his success, becoming the top scorer again.

He played for Saturn from 2007 to 2010. In 2008 in the first match of his team in the UEFA Intertoto Cup, in the victory 7–0, he scored 4 goals. He did not play in the second match of that round. At the next round he scored a goal at the first match in a 1–0 victory against 2007 German champions VfB Stuttgart. With 5 goals at total he became the top scorer of the UEFA Intertoto Cup 2008.

In 2011, after Saturn were dissolved due to financial problems, Kirichenko returned to Rostov, the club where he had made a name for himself back in the 1990s.

== International career ==
He played for his country at Euro 2004, scoring in the second minute against Greece as Russia defeated the eventual European champions 2–1 in a consolation match as Russia were already eliminated. The goal stood as the fastest goal ever in a European Championship until Nedim Bajrami of Albania scored against Italy in 23 seconds at Euro 2024.

== Managerial career ==
He was appointed the caretaker manager of Rostov on 6 August 2016 following the resignation of Kurban Berdyev. His caretaking spell ended on 9 September 2016.

He was appointed the caretaker manager of Ufa on 7 November 2018. Ufa won their first game under his management against Spartak Moscow, but in the next 6 games the club only achieved 2 draws and 4 losses, and on 27 March 2019 Kirichenko left Ufa by mutual consent.

On 26 September 2026, Kirichenko returned to Rostov as a manager.

== Career statistics ==
=== Club ===
Club	Season	League			Russian Cup		Europe		Other		Total	
Club	Season	Division	Apps	Goals	Apps	Goals	Apps	Goals	Apps	Goals	Apps	Goals
Torpedo Taganrog	1996		37	7			–		–		37	7
Torpedo Taganrog	1997		36	32			–		–		36	22
Torpedo Taganrog	Total		73	39			–		–		73	39
Rostselmash	1998	Russian Top Division	23	5	2	1			–		25	6
Rostselmash	1999	Russian Top Division	28	6	2	0	6	0	–		36	6
Rostselmash	2000	Russian Top Division	29	14	1	0	2	1	–		32	15
Rostselmash	2001	Russian Top Division	28	13			–		–		28	13
Rostselmash	Total		108	38	5	1	8	1	–		121	40
CSKA Moscow	2002	Russian Premier League	26	15	2	0	1	0	–		29	15
CSKA Moscow	2003	Russian Premier League	22	5	4	1	2	1	1 (Note: Appearance in Russian Super Cup)	0	29	7
CSKA Moscow	2004	Russian Premier League	26	9	5	2	3	0	1	1	35	12
CSKA Moscow	Total		74	29	11	3	6	1	2	1	93	34
Moscow	2005	Russian Premier League	26	14			–		–		26	14
Moscow	2006	Russian Premier League	29	12	4	4	4	0	–		37	16
Moscow	Total		55	26	4	4	4	0	–		63	30
Saturn Ramenskoye	2007	Russian Premier League	27	9	2	1	–		–		29	10
Saturn Ramenskoye	2008	Russian Premier League	17	1	1	0	3	5	–		21	6
Saturn Ramenskoye	2009	Russian Premier League	27	8			–		–		27	8
Saturn Ramenskoye	2010	Russian Premier League	28	8			–		–		28	8
Saturn Ramenskoye	Total		99	26	3	1	3	5	–		105	32
Rostov	2011–12	Russian Premier League	19	5	3	0	–		2	1	24	6
Rostov	2012–13	Russian Premier League	22	5	4	1	–		1	0	27	6
Rostov	Total		41	10	7	1	–		3	1	51	12
Mordovia Saransk	2013–14	Russian Football National League	12	1	2	0	–		–		13	1
Career total			462	169	32	10	21	7	5	2	520	188

=== International ===
#	Date	Venue	Opponent	Score	Result	Competition
1	28 April 2004	Ullevaal Stadion, Oslo, Norway	Norway	3–2	3–2	Friendly
2	20 June 2004	Estádio Algarve, Faro, Portugal	Greece	0–1	1–2	UEFA Euro 2004
3	8 October 2005	Lokomotiv Stadium, Moscow, Russia	Luxembourg	4–1	5–1	2006 FIFA World Cup qualification
4	8 October 2005	Lokomotiv Stadium, Moscow, Russia	Luxembourg	5–1	5–1	2006 FIFA World Cup qualification

== Honours ==
CSKA Moscow

- Russian Premier League: 2003
- Russian Cup: 2001–02
- Russian Super Cup: 2004; runner-up: 2003
- UEFA Cup: 2004–05

Preceded by Sergei Aleinikov	UEFA European Football Championship fastest goal 2004–2024	Succeeded by Nedim Bajrami
