= Shandong Taishan F.C. =

Chinese professional football club in Jinan

Shandong Taishan 山东泰山
- Full name: Shandong Taishan Football Club 山东泰山足球俱乐部
- Nicknames: Taishan Dui (Chinese: 泰山队; lit. 'The team of Mount Tai')
- Founded: 10 April 1956; 70 years ago (Semi-professional); 2 December 1993; 32 years ago (Professional)
- Ground: Jinan Olympic Sports Center Stadium
- Capacity: 56,808
- Owner: Shandong Luneng Group
- Chairman: Sun Hua
- Head coach: Dragan Stojković
- League: Chinese Super League
- 2026: Chinese Super League, 4th of 16
- Website: www.lnts.com.cn
Home colours	Away colours

Shandong Taishan F.C.
- Traditional Chinese: 山東泰山
- Simplified Chinese: 山东泰山
- Literal meaning: Shandong Mount Tai
Transcriptions
Standard Mandarin
- Hanyu Pinyin: Shāndōng Tàishān

Shandong Taishan Football Club (Chinese: 山东泰山足球俱乐部; pinyin: Shāndōng Tàishān Zúqiú Jùlèbù) is a Chinese professional football club based in Jinan, Shandong, that competes in the Chinese Super League, the top tier of Chinese football. Shandong Taishan plays its home matches at the Jinan Olympic Sports Center Stadium, located within Lixia District. Their current majority shareholder is Shandong Electric Power Group Corporation, the biggest supplier of electric energy in Shandong province and itself part of the State Grid Corporation of China. Shandong Taishan is one of the four clubs to have never been relegated from the Chinese top-flight since the Chinese Super League's foundation in 2004. The club name Taishan derives from Mount Tai.

The club's predecessor was called Shandong Provincial team which was founded on 10 April 1956, while the current professional football team was established on 2 December 1993. They were one of the founding members of the first fully professional top-tier football league in China. Since then, they have gone on to win their first league title in the 1999 league season. They have continued to win domestic silverware with the 2006, 2008, 2010 and 2021 league titles, making them one of the most successful football clubs in China.

According to Forbes, Shandong is the 5th most valuable football team in China, with a team value of $126 million, and an estimated revenue of $24 million in 2015. In that year, Beijing Guoan, Guangzhou Evergrande and Shandong Luneng Taishan were the only Chinese sports clubs with at least 5 million followers on Weibo.

== History ==
=== Early club era ===
The club was founded on 10 April 1956 as Shandong Provincial team by the local Shandong Province government, to participate in the recently established and expanding Chinese football league, where the team originally named themselves Shandong Provincial team. Shandong took part in the 1957 league season, where they started within the second tier and finished bottom within the group stages. The following season saw an improvement from the team, finishing third within their group, however participation within the league became sporadic as the management decided to concentrate the team's efforts on the multi-sport event Chinese National Games. Participating within the 1965 Chinese National Games, the club ultimately finished ninth within the tournament. The following season, any attempt to return to the league was halted for several seasons due to the Chinese Cultural Revolution.

When the league started back up again in 1973, Shandong were allowed to be included in the top tier and finished ninth at the end of the campaign. As the seasons progressed, they established themselves as regulars within the league, however the management still wished to compete within the Chinese National Games and entered a team in the 1979 tournament which they won, beating Beijing 3–1 in the final. The success of that tournament acted as a springboard for the team, and Shandong finish as runners-up of the 1981 and 1982 league campaigns. The momentum Shandong showed at the start of the decade quickly faded, and by the end of the decade they had experienced their first-ever relegation, finishing in the bottom positions for the 1989 league season. Unfortunately for Shandong, they were once again relegated the following season and sent down to the third tier.

The club's time within the third division did not last very long, and they immediately won the division title and promotion at the end of the 1991 league season. The following campaign saw the Chinese Football Association decide to make Chinese football fully professional, and this seemed to spur on the club, as they came third within the division and guaranteed promotion to the first fully professional top-tier league, the 1994 Chinese Jia-A League. On 2 December 1993, Shandong football club became fully professional, gathered sponsorship and changed their name to Shandong Taishan Football Club. On 29 January 1994, Jinan City, the city government sponsored and participated in the club's management, changing its name to Shandong Jinan Taishan Football Club to accommodate this.

=== Turning professional ===
Shandong would be one of the founding teams to participate within the inaugural fully professional 1994 Chinese Jia-A League season; however, the owners quickly ran into financial problems with the improved player wages and added costs of running a professional club, which saw players often paid late. The lack of funds also saw the club unable to sign any foreign imports, making them one of the few teams in the league without any foreign players within their roster. To add to the club's problems, several veterans left at the end of the season. On 3 April 1995, the club rebranded to Jinan Taishan General. Under new manager Yin Tiesheng, such players as Li Xiaopeng, Liu Yue and Su Maozhen given chances. They defeated the newly-crowned Shanghai Greenland Shenhua in the 1995 Chinese FA Cup final. After the victory, Shandong General Tobacco (Group) Co., Ltd. became interested in the club and, on 2 March 1996, took control of the team, investing 6.5 million yuan into the club. With the continued investment from the Jinan City government as well, the club was on a sure financial footing, and with Su Maozhen becoming the league's top goal scorer and the team reaching another cup final again in 1996, things looked to have improved, despite a final day loss to Beijing Guoan 4–1.

=== First foreign head coach ===
On 4 December 1997, the club held a consultation with the Shandong Electric Power Group Corporation and, on 5 January 1998, Shandong Electric Power Group Corporation became the majority shareholders of the club and changed the club's name to Shandong Luneng Football Club. While the Jinan City government still had significant shareholdings within the club, the new majority shareholders decided that the team needed a new direction and brought in the club's first ever foreign coach in Kim Jung-Nam at the beginning of the 1998 league season, after Yin Tiesheng wasn't able to improve upon the previous season's results. Kim came into Shandong with a reputation of having led South Korea into the 1986 FIFA World Cup, their first World Cup in over 32 years. He dramatically changed the team's style of play and emphasized attacking football, and new signing Deng Lejun from Beijing Guo'an thrived on this, scoring seven goals. Kim's style, however, didn't bring the team many wins, and he resigned later in the season, while Yin Tiesheng returned to manage the team away from relegation.

=== First league title ===
On 25 December 1998, former Yugoslavia national team head coach Slobodan Santrač joined Shandong as their new manager for the start of the 1999 league season. With key foreign signings in Yugoslavian goalkeeper Saša Petrović, striker Luis Romero combining with now established Chinese international Su Maozhen along with the emergence of Li Xiaopeng, Shandong had the backbone of a team that surprised many to go on to the final day of the season and defeat Chongqing Longxin 5–0 to claim their first ever league title. Several days later, the club would achieve their first ever domestic cup double when they beat Dalian Wanda 4–3 on aggregate to clinch the 1999 Chinese FA Cup, which resulted in Santrač personally being awarded the Chinese 'Coach of the Year' award. The 1999 FA Cup victory would unfortunately be tainted by controversy when, on 18 February 2013, it was confirmed by the Chinese police that former Chinese football association Head of refereeing, Zhang Jianqiang was paid 400,000 Yuan by the club to select the referees for their fixtures in the tournament. Shandong would later be fined one million Yuan by the Chinese football association for this transgression.

For the start of the 2000 league season, Paraguayan striker Casiano Delvalle and midfielder Charles Wittl were brought in to replace the exiting Luis Romero. Unfortunately for Shandong, they got off to the worst possible start to the season by losing their first game of the new campaign to the newly promoted side Yunnan Hongta 1–0. The club continued to struggle with defending their title and by the 16 July clash with Qingdao Etsong Hainiu, the pressure had already seen Santrač refuse to speak to the media despite Shandong actually winning the game 4–2. With the title already gone from Shandong and Santrač appearing to have lost control of the team he was forced to resign on 13 September 2000, while youth team coach Đoko Koković temporarily took over the team for the remainder of the season.

=== Dong Gang ===
In preparation for the 2001 season, speculations grew. Croatian Miroslav Blažević was rumoured to become the new head coach for the club's first team. After the end of the 2000 season, Shao Kenan was forced to step down as general manager and Dong Gang became his replacement on 2 November 2000. Dong's first decision was to hire Russian Boris Ignatiev. With Casiano Delvalle being the previous season's top goal scorer and the introduction of foreign veterans such as Gabriel Mendoza, José Herrera and Serhiy Nahornyak, expectations were high for Shandong. However, the team started the new season badly, losing 0–1 to newly promoted side Shaanxi National Power in their opening match. Shandong Luneng then experienced one of the most devastating defeats in their history in the continental 2000–01 Asian Club Championship in March 2001, where they lost 6–2 to Júbilo Iwata and then 6–0 to the Suwon Samsung Bluewings. These were the first of a series of Shandong's humiliating defeats on the international stage, affecting the team's morale. In the summer of 2001, Nii Lamptey and later Márcio Santos were signed in an effort to halt the losing streak. Lamptey was instrumental in helping Shandong regain confidence and they finished their remaining matches strongly with 9 wins and 1 draw, including 7 straight wins towards the end of the 2001 season.

Another Russian, Valeri Nepomniachi, who achieved great success at the 1990 FIFA World Cup with Cameroon, was appointed as Shandong's new head coach on 18 December 2001. Under his reign, the team's performance improved initially and finished 4th in the 2002 season, their second-best result since 1994. Nepomniachi was to stay for another year. However, Shandong struggled throughout the season and only finished 12th, barely avoiding relegation. Despite being named in a match-fixing scandal, Dong stayed as the club's general manager for another 2 years until November 2005, when he left his position to Kang Mengjun. Along the way, he made the decision to hire Ljubiša Tumbaković, who was to become Shandong's most successful manager.

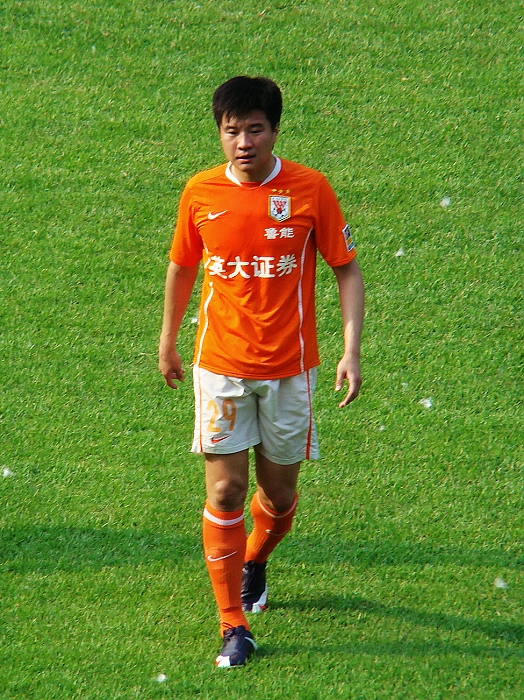
Li Jinyu in action for Shandong Luneng

On 7 January 2004, Serbian Ljubiša Tumbaković was brought in as head coach for the rebranded 2004 Chinese Super League and, with the signing of Chinese international striker Li Jinyu along with the emergence of Han Peng, the club were able to win the 2004 Chinese FA Cup by beating Sichuan First City in the final. With the continued investment coming from the signing of another Chinese international in Zheng Zhi, Shandong looked to provide a better showing in the club's second outing in the 2005 AFC Champions League, where they reached the quarter-finals before being humbled by eventual winners Al Ittihad of Saudi Arabia with an 8–3 aggregate. The capitulation against Al-Ittihad, which saw Tumbakovic and players Zheng Zhi as well as Predrag Pažin sent off for abusive and violent conduct, would ultimately affect the team's performance within the league, and see them lose the 2005 league title, eventually finishing in third pllace.

In the 2006 Chinese Super League campaign, Tumbaković looked to overcome the disappointment of the previous season, and with the club not in the Champions League Shandong could concentrate on winning a league and cup double. With talented and motivated young players that included Cui Peng, Zhou Haibin and Wang Yongpo (along with Zheng Zhi personally winning the 2006 most valuable player award and Li Jinyu gaining the top goal scorer award), Shandong breezed to the title with several games remaining and, at the time, the highest points and goal total in Chinese football league history. After gaining his MVP title, Zheng Zhi would interest then-top tier English club Charlton Athletic, who he initially joined on loan before making his move permanent. His departure would see Shandong struggle in the 2007 AFC Champions League, and they couldn't improve upon their previous ACL results; despite gaining 13 points they were knocked out of the competition in the group stage by Korean club Seongnam Ilhwa Chunma, who finished above them on goal difference. The continental exit would once again repercuss into the league and see Shandong unable to defend their title. Without the Champions League to contend with, Tumbaković was able to regroup his team again and win the 2008 league campaign on the final day of the season when a 0–0 draw against Guangzhou Pharmaceutical was enough to clinch the title.

On 7 February 2009, the team's Chinese international footballer Zhou Haibin signed for top tier Dutch club PSV Eindhoven on a free transfer. His sudden departure gave Shandong a confusing and difficult pre-season preparation, which saw them start the 2009 AFC Champions League with a 3–0 defeat to Japanese club Gamba Osaka on 10 March 2009. This detrimental start would ultimately see the club unable to reach the knockout stage once again under Tumbaković. The club's league form also suffered, and after the team came fourth in their attempt to defend their title, the Shandong management decided to let Tumbaković go.

=== Sun Guoyu ===
On 21 November 2009, Sun Guoyu came in as the new general manager of the club, and his first assignment was to hire Branko Ivanković on 16 December 2009 as the club's new head coach. Established Chinese international player Deng Zhuoxiang joined the team before the start of the 2010 league campaign in hopes of revitialising the team's midfield. Once again Shandong's continental campaign saw them knocked out in the group stage of the 2010 AFC Champions League; however, unlike previous seasons, Shandong were able to recover from this disappointment, and with the inclusion of Julio César de León during the season, were able to win the league title. The club's defence of their league title saw promising youngster Zhang Chi seriously injured in the first game of the 2011 league season. The repercussion of his injury saw Shandong have a slow start to the season and on the verge of being eliminated once again in the group stage of the Champions League, which resulted in Ivanković resigning on 5 May 2011, two days after losing 2–1 to Jeonbuk Hyundai Motors. Rajko Magić took on the helm of head coach, however he was sacked after a series of losses and replaced by the head coach of the club's football school Manuel Barbosa on a caretaker basis, where he guided the team to a runners-up spot in the 2011 Chinese FA Cup.

On 6 January 2012, Dutch coach Henk ten Cate was appointed as the new manager of the team. It was hoped that with his experience in previously managing Ajax, the birthplace of total football, he would enforce a faster, more free-flowing playing style. However, Henk ten Cate experimented with youth and alienated experienced regulars in Han Peng, Wang Yongpo and Liu Jindong, while the youngsters became overwhelmed with the increase of competitiveness. With the club's playmaker Roda Antar out injured, the management decided to sign experienced players in Du Wei, Simão Mate Junior, José Ortigoza and Leonardo Pisculichi. Henk ten Cate would eventually call back Wang Yongpo and Han Peng into the team, however by then the club were flirting with relegation and had been knocked out of the FA Cup. Henk ten Cate would resign on 6 September 2012, and was replaced by Chinese coach Wu Jingui, with Ten Cate stating he had left for personal reasons, with the monotonous daily life in Taishan and living separated from his family being the main signifiers.

Controversies off the field would ultimately summarize Sun Guoyu's reign as general manager when on 6 October 2010 the Ministry of Public Security of the People's Republic of China would confirm the arrests of former Chinese Football Association vice chairman Xie Yalong for accepting bribes as well as his knowledge match-fixing during his tenure. While under arrest he would claim that Shandong paid him 200,000 Yuan to select the referee for the 26 August 2006 league game against Beijing Guoan, played at Shandong's home stadium in a match they won 1–0 on their way to clinching the 2006 league championship. The former Head of Refereeing at the Chinese FA, Zhang Jianqiang, would corroborate this story and also claimed that he was paid 400,000 Yuan as a "thank you" from the club for his previous refereeing selections during his tenure. On 18 February 2013, the Chinese Football Association disciplinary committee found Shandong guilty of violating the regulations of the sport and fined them one million Yuan. On 25 December 2013, Sun Guoyu was replaced by Liu Yu as the new general manager of the team.

=== Cuca ===
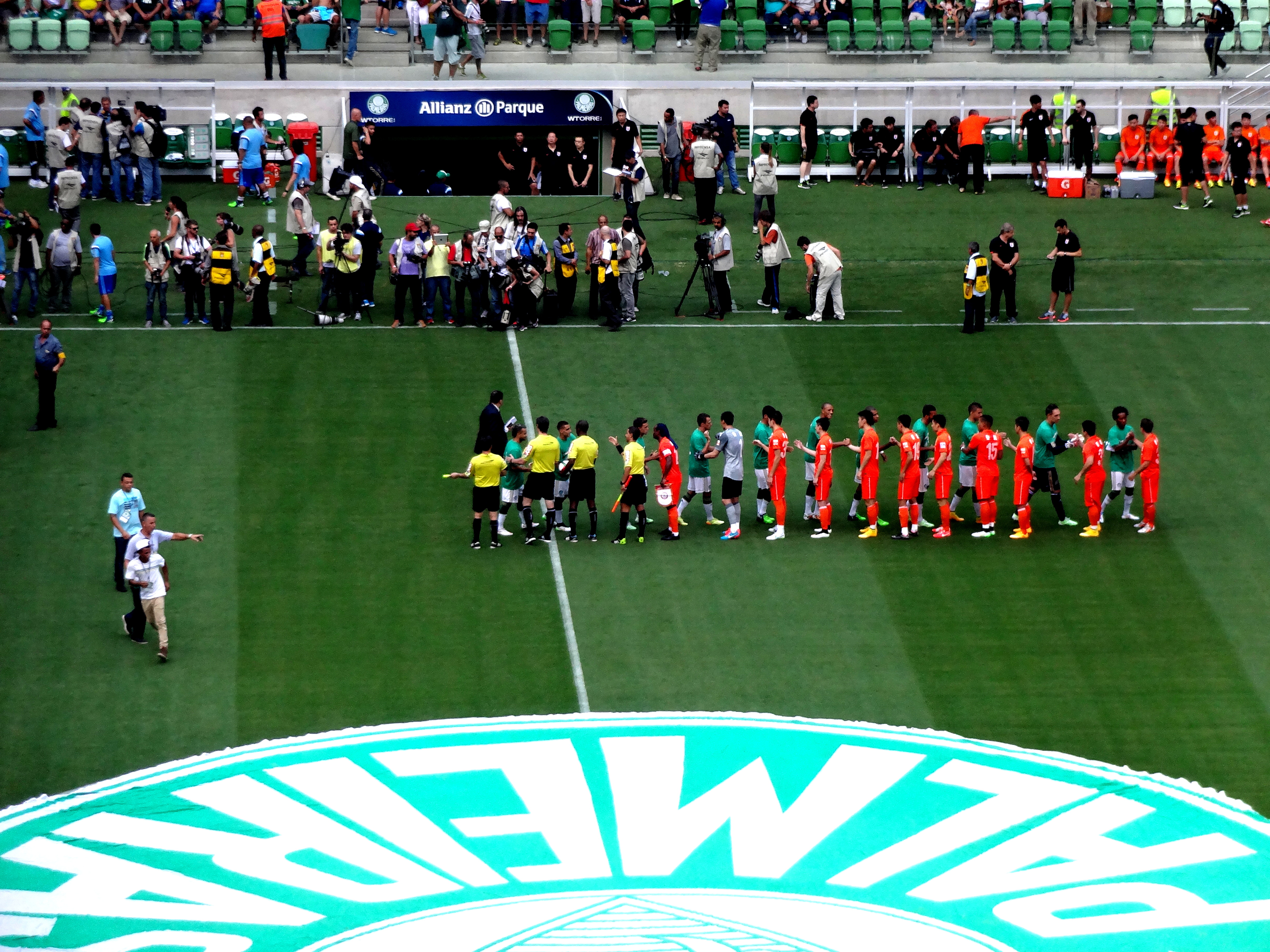
Shandong Luneng taking on Palmeiras in January 2015

On 22 December 2013, Shandong Luneng announced that Brazilian former footballer Cuca would become the new coach of the team. In 2013, Shandong was eliminated in the AFC Champions League group stage and finished fourth in the Chinese Super League. On 22 November 2014, Ryan McGowan's last-gasp header helped the team defeat Jiangsu Sainty and win the Chinese FA Cup in dramatic fashion, entering next year's Champions League. In 2015, Cuca's team failed to qualify from the group stage of the 2015 AFC Champions League again, but finished third in the domestic league, earning the chance to participate in the 2016 AFC Champions League qualification stage.

=== Mano Menezes and Felix Magath ===
In December 2015, former Brazil national team manager Mano Menezes became Shandong's new head coach, assisted by Li Xiaopeng.

On 21 April 2016, with a 1–0 victory over Japanese side Sanfrecce Hiroshima, Shandong returned to the Round of 16 in the 2016 AFC Champions League after an 11-year absence where the club finished as group runners-up below Korean club FC Seoul. On 25 May, they defeated Australian club Sydney FC on away goal rules with an aggregate of 3–3 to reach the Quarter-finals. However, bad results in the domestic league led to Menezes' resignation on 7 June 2016. Felix Magath was appointed the next day.

=== Li Xiaopeng ===
In 2017, Li Xiaopeng became the new manager after Magath was dismissed. Li would lead the club to several years of contention. This included a third-placed finish in the 2018 Chinese Super League and two Chinese FA Cup finals, winning the trophy in 2020 and finishing as runner-up in 2019.

=== Hao Wei ===
After Li Xiaopeng, Hao Wei became the new manager of Shandong Taishan in 2020. The team won the 2021 Chinese Super League title, and won three consecutive Chinese FA Cup in 2020, 2021 and 2022 respectively. making it the 8th time for Taishan to win the FA Cup in the club history.

=== Choi Kang-hee ===
Due to Hao Wei's corruption scandal, Choi Kang-hee became the team's new coach in May 2023. The team won the league runner-up and cup runner-up in 2023. They also participated in the ACL competition and broke through the group stage.

In 2024, the team ranked fifth in the Chinese Super League, and were the runners-up of the 2024 Chinese FA Cup.

In 2026, Shandong Taishan started the 2026 Chinese Super League season with six points deducted for violation of sports ethics and loss of sportsmanship, engaging in improper transactions to seek illegitimate benefits.

== Rivalries ==
Shandong Taishan and Beijing-based club, Beijing Guoan contest the Jing–Lu rivalry, one of the longest-running rivalries in Chinese football. The two clubs have met in the Chinese top-flight in every season since the professionalism of Chinese football. Shandong Taishan leads the all-time series with ten more wins than Beijing Guoan.

== Kit manufacturers ==
With the start of professionalization in the 1994 league season, Shandong were allowed to gain sponsorship and foreign investment. Adidas provided their kit from 1994 until 2001. Mizuno took over from 2002 until 2004. Nike began to provide the kits in 2005 and in 2011, they extended their association with the club along with the Chinese Super League when they signed a 10-year deal to provide all the apparel for the whole league.

== Affiliated clubs ==
- (Japan) Júbilo Iwata (since 2005)
- (Australia) Adelaide United (since 2008)
- (Brazil) São Paulo (since 2013)

== Current squad ==
=== First team squad ===
As of July 2026

Note: Flags indicate national team as defined under FIFA eligibility rules; some limited exceptions apply. Players may hold more than one non-FIFA nationality.

No.	Pos.	Nation	Player
1	GK	CHN	Yu Jinyong
2	DF	CHN	Yang Ruiqi
3	DF	CHN	Peng Xiao
5	DF	CHN	Zheng Zheng
6	DF	CHN	Wang Tong
7	MF	CHN	Xie Wenneng
8	MF	BRA	Guilherme Madruga
9	FW	BRA	Cryzan
10	MF	GEO	Valeri Qazaishvili
11	DF	CHN	Liu Yang
14	GK	CHN	Wang Dalei
15	DF	CHN	Shi Songchen
17	FW	HKG	Raphaël Merkies
19	FW	BRA	Zeca
22	MF	CHN	Li Yuanyi
23	DF	POR	Pedro Álvaro

No.	Pos.	Nation	Player
28	MF	CHN	Mewlan Mijit
29	FW	CHN	Chen Pu
32	GK	CHN	Sun Qihang
33	DF	CHN	Gao Zhunyi
34	MF	CHN	Yin Jiaxi
35	DF	CHN	Huang Zhengyu
36	GK	CHN	Liu Qiwei
37	MF	CHN	Chen Zeshi
38	MF	CHN	Imran Memet
40	FW	CHN	Mei Shuaijun
41	FW	CHN	Lu Junwei
42	FW	CHN	Peng Yixiang
44	DF	CHN	Qi Qiancheng
60	DF	CHN	Hao Fubo

=== B-team squad ===
As of July 2026

Note: Flags indicate national team as defined under FIFA eligibility rules; some limited exceptions apply. Players may hold more than one non-FIFA nationality.

No.	Pos.	Nation	Player
2	DF	CHN	Deng Zhiwen
4	DF	CHN	Hu Hangming
5	DF	CHN	Li Junpeng
7	FW	CHN	Li Yuanjie
8	FW	CHN	He Kanghua
9	FW	CHN	Sun Ziyue
13	GK	CHN	Ihsen Ilham
14	MF	CHN	Guo Xin
16	DF	CHN	Yan Hengye
18	MF	CHN	Li Xiang
19	FW	CHN	Wang Zicheng
21	GK	CHN	Niu Bowei
22	MF	CHN	Zhang Xuyao
23	DF	CHN	Wang Tianyou
26	MF	CHN	Zhao Guancheng
27	MF	CHN	Bao Kaiwen
29	MF	CHN	Ma Yinhao
30	MF	CHN	Xiao Chenxi

No.	Pos.	Nation	Player
35	DF	CHN	Huang Yizhou
36	GK	CHN	Liu Qiwei
37	MF	CHN	Chen Zeshi
38	MF	CHN	Imran Memet
40	FW	CHN	Mei Shuaijun
41	FW	CHN	Lu Junwei
42	FW	CHN	Peng Yixiang
43	FW	CHN	Wang Yuxuan
44	DF	CHN	Qi Qiancheng
46	DF	CHN	Chen Zihan
47	DF	CHN	Duan Feida
48	MF	CHN	Yang Yang
49	MF	CHN	Deng Chunze
50	GK	CHN	Fu Zhenhao
55	DF	CHN	He Bingzhuang
57	MF	CHN	Ezher Tashmemet
60	DF	CHN	Hao Fubo

=== Out on loan ===
Note: Flags indicate national team as defined under FIFA eligibility rules; some limited exceptions apply. Players may hold more than one non-FIFA nationality.

No.	Pos.	Nation	Player
—	MF	CHN	Wu Xinghan (at (China) Tianjin Jinmen Tiger until 31 December 2026)
—	FW	CHN	Liu Guobao (at (China) Qingdao Hainiu until 31 December 2026)
—	MF	CHN	Wang Haobin (at (China) Guangdong GZ-Power until 31 December 2026)

No.	Pos.	Nation	Player
—	MF	CHN	Liu Binbin (at (China) Wuhan Three Towns until 31 December 2026)
—	DF	CHN	Zhao Jianfei (at (China) Shenzhen Peng City until 31 December 2026)
—	MF	POR	Pedro Delgado (at (China) Dalian Yingbo until 31 December 2026)

=== Retired numbers ===
12 – Club Supporters (the 12th Man) retired in February 2017.

== Coaching staff ==
Name	Role
(Serbia) Dragan Stojković	Head coach
(China) Zhao Shuo	Assistant coach
(Brazil) Lucas Cerqueira	Goalkeeping coach
(Spain) Roberto Barrena	Fitness coach
(China) Zhang Haitao	B-team head coach
(China) Zhao Jie	B-team assistant coach
(China) Xu Yang	B-team goalkeeping coach

=== Managerial history ===
Only League matches are counted.

#	Manager	From	To	Season(s)	Played	Won	Drawn	Lost	Notes
1	(China) Yin Tiesheng	1994-02-10	1997-12-21	1994–97	88	31	27	30	
2	(South Korea) Kim Jung-nam	1998-01-27	1998-08-23	1998	19	5	7	7	
C	(China) Yin Tiesheng	1998-08-24	1998-10-25	1998	7	3	1	3	
3	(Serbia) Slobodan Santrač	1998-12-25	2000-09-13	1999–00	48	24	12	12	
C	(Serbia) Đoko Koković	2000-09-14	2000-10-01	2000	4	1	1	2	
4	(Russia) Boris Ignatiev	2000-11-30	2001-12-16	2001	26	13	6	7	
5	(Russia) Valeri Nepomniachi	2001-12-18	2003-11-30	2002–03	56	22	12	22	
6	(Serbia) Ljubiša Tumbaković	2004-01-07	2009-11-04	2004–09	164	90	43	31	
7	(Croatia) Branko Ivanković	2009-12-16	2011-05-05	2010–11	35	20	10	5	
C	(Croatia) Rajko Magić	2011-05-06	2011-09-14	2011	18	7	5	6	
C	(Portugal) Manuel Barbosa	2011-09-15	2011-11-19	2011	7	4	2	1	
8	(Netherlands) Henk ten Cate	2012-01-06	2012-09-06	2012	23	6	8	9	
C	(China) Wu Jingui	2012-09-07	2012-11-03	2012	7	2	4	1	
9	(Serbia) Radomir Antić	2012-12-24	2013-12-19	2013	30	18	5	7	
10	(Brazil) Cuca	2013-12-21	2015-12-06	2014–15	60	30	17	13	
11	(Brazil) Mano Menezes	2015-12-06	2016-06-07	2016	22	8	7	7	
12	(Germany) Felix Magath	2016-06-08	2017-12-01	2016–17	49	20	14	15	
13	(China) Li Xiaopeng	2017-12-01	2020-10-05	2018–20	98	54	22	22	
14	(China) Hao Wei	2020-10-05	2023-05-16	2020–2023	89	61	15	13	
15	(South Korea) Choi Kang-hee	2023-05-17	2025-07-07	2023–2025	69	35	19	15	
16	(China) Han Peng	2025-07-16	2026-07-28	2025–2026	34	17	7	10	
17	(China) Tang Tian	2026-07-28	2026-11-16	2026	10	7	2	1	
18	(Serbia) Dragan Stojković	2026-11-16		2027					

== Honours ==
=== League ===
- Chinese Super League:
  - Winners (4): 2006, 2008, 2010, 2021
- Chinese Jia-A League (1994–2003)
  - Winners: 1999

=== Cup ===
- Chinese FA Cup:
  - Winners (8): 1995, 1999, 2004, 2006, 2014, 2020, 2021, 2022
- Chinese Super League Cup
  - Winners: 2004
- Chinese FA Super Cup
  - Winners: 2015

=== Reserve team ===
- Chinese Super League Reserve League Champions: 2006, 2010, 2011, 2012, 2013, 2014, 2015
- Coca-Cola Olympic League Champions: 2000
- Coca-Cola Olympic League Champions: 2001

=== Youth team ===
U19 team:

- National U19 Youth League Champions: 2009
- Nike Youth League Champions; U19 Winners Cup Winners: 2005

U17 team:

- National U17 Youth League Champions: 2001, 2003, 2005, 2007, 2010
- Adidas Youth League Champions; U17 Winners Cup Winners: 2004
- Nike Youth League Champions: 2005
- Adidas Youth League Champions: 2006
- Adidas Youth League Champions: 2007
- U17 Winners Cup Winners: 2008

U15 team:

- National U15 Youth League Champions: 2005, 2006, 2007, 2008, 2013
- Nike Cup Winners: 2001
- Nike Cup Winners: 2002
- Adidas Youth League Champions: 2004
- Nike Youth League Champions: 2005
- Adidas Youth League Champions; U15 FA Cup Winners: 2006
- Adidas Youth League Champions; U15 FA Cup Winners; Nike Cup Winners: 2007
- Adidas Youth League Champions; U15 Winners Cup Winners: 2008

== Results ==
=== All-time league rankings ===
- As of the end of 2020 season.

Season	Div.	Pld	W	D	L	GF	GA	GD	Pts	Pos.	FA Cup	Super Cup	League Cup	ACL	Other		Att./G	Stadium
1957	Jia B	6								6^{1}	NH	–	–	–	–	–		
1958	Jia B	9								3^{1}	NH	–	–	–	–	–		
1960	Jia B	8	1^{2}	3^{2}	1^{2}	6^{2}	5^{2}	1^{2}	5^{2}	9	DNE	–	–	–	–	–		
1965	Jia B	10								8^{1}	NH	–	–	–	–	–		
1973	Jia A	19	11	5	3	33	14	19	18^{2}	9	NH	–	–	–				
1974	Jia A	13	6	1	6	19	19	0	2^{2}	27	NH	–	–	–				
1976	Jia A	8	5	2	1	15	4	11	12	2^{1}	NH	–	–	–				
1977	Jia A	17	4	6	7	18	22	−4	3^{2}	11	NH	–	–	–				
1978	Jia A	30	9	12	9	29	32	−3	30	8	NH	–	–	–				
1979	Jia A	30	11	6	13	37	37	0	28	12	NH	–	–	–				
1980	Jia A	30	10	12	8	36	28	8	32	4	NH	–	–	–				
1981	Jia A	30	18	–	12				40	2	NH	–	–	–				
1982	Jia A	30	20	–	10	56	26	30	40	2	NH	–	–	–				
1983	Jia A	14	11	–	3	20	8	12	22	2^{3}	NH	–	–	–				
1984	Jia A	30	14	–	16	22	26	4	28	9	9	–	–	–				
1985	Jia A	15	6	–	9			13	13	12	8	–	–	DNQ				
1986	Jia A	14	6	6	2	17	6	11	18	6	5	–	–	DNQ				
1987	Jia A	14	5	6	3	14	10	4	21	4	NH	–	–	DNQ				
1988	Jia A	25	13	8	4	27	13	14	48.5	4	NH	–	–	DNQ				
1989	Jia A	14	2	8	4	8	10	−2	14	7	NH	–	–	DNQ				
1990	Jia B	22	6	9	7	23	32	9	27	11	SF	–	–	DNQ				
1991	Yi	12								1	DNQ	–	–	DNQ				
1992	Jia B	16	4	9	3	14	13	1	6	3^{4}	DNQ	–	–	DNQ				
1993	Jia B	5	2	0/0	3	7	8	−1	4	4^{1}	NH	–	–	DNQ				
1994	Jia A	22	10	4	8	22	22	0	24	5	NH	NH	NH	DNQ			19,727	Shandong Provincial Stadium
1995	Jia A	22	6	9	7	27	28	−1	27	6	W	RU	NH	DNQ			24,545	Shandong Provincial Stadium
1996	Jia A	22	8	7	7	23	24	−1	31	5	RU	DNQ	NH	DNE^{5}			42,272	Shandong Provincial Stadium
1997	Jia A	22	7	7	8	19	22	−3	28	6	QF	DNQ	NH	DNQ			22,545	Shandong Provincial Stadium
1998	Jia A	26	8	8	10	39	40	−1	32	9	SF	DNQ	NH	DNQ			28,231	Shandong Provincial Stadium
1999	Jia A	26	13	9	4	33	13	20	48	1	W	RU	NH	DNQ			33,538	Shandong Provincial Stadium
2000	Jia A	26	12	4	10	35	31	4	40	5	SF	DNQ	NH	QF			27,231	Shandong Provincial Stadium
2001	Jia A	26	13	6	7	42	32	10	45	6	SF	DNQ	NH	DNQ			21,385	Shandong Provincial Stadium
2002	Jia A	28	14	3	11	42	42	0	45	4	R2	DNQ	NH	DNQ			21,571	Shandong Provincial Stadium
2003	Jia A	28	8	9	11	42	46	4	33	12	QF	DNQ	NH	DNQ			23,286	Shandong Provincial Stadium
2004	CSL	22	10	6	6	44	29	15	36	2	W	NH	W	DNQ			23,636	Shandong Provincial Stadium
2005	CSL	26	15	7	4	47	30	17	52	3	RU	NH	SF	QF			26,000	Shandong Provincial Stadium
2006	CSL	28	22	3	3	74	26	48	69	1	W	NH	NH	DNQ			31,808	Shandong Provincial Stadium
2007	CSL	28	14	6	8	53	29	24	48	3	NH	NH	NH	Group	A3	RU	22,607	Shandong Provincial Stadium
2008	CSL	30	18	9	3	54	25	29	63	1	NH	NH	NH	DNQ			26,501	Shandong Provincial Stadium
2009	CSL	30	11	12	7	35	30	5	45	4	NH	NH	NH	Group	PP	4	17,072	Shandong Provincial Stadium
2010	CSL	30	18	9	3	59	34	25	63	1	NH	NH	NH	Group			15,864	Shandong Provincial Stadium
2011	CSL	30	13	8	9	37	31	6	47	5	RU	NH	NH	Group			12,112	Shandong Provincial Stadium
2012	CSL	30	8	12	10	46	43	3	36	12	SF	DNQ	NH	DNQ			20,148	Shandong Provincial Stadium
2013	CSL	30	18	5	7	55	35	20	59	2	R4	DNQ	NH	DNQ			27,683	Jinan Olympic Sports Center Stadium
2014	CSL	30	12	12	6	41	29	12	48	4	W	DNQ	NH	Group			23,931	Jinan Olympic Sports Center Stadium
2015	CSL	30	18	5	7	66	41	25	59	3	SF	W	NH	Group			22,559	Jinan Olympic Sports Center Stadium
2016	CSL	30	9	7	14	38	45	−7	34	14	R4	DNQ	NH	QF			18,932	Jinan Olympic Sports Center Stadium
2017	CSL	30	13	10	7	49	33	16	49	6	QF	DNQ	NH	DNQ			30,283	Jinan Olympic Sports Center Stadium
2018	CSL	30	17	7	6	57	39	18	58	3	RU	DNQ	NH	DNQ			24,785	Jinan Olympic Sports Center Stadium
2019	CSL	30	15	6	9	55	35	20	51	5	RU	DNQ	NH	R16			22,181	Jinan Olympic Sports Center Stadium
2020	CSL	20	9	5	6	35	25	10	32	5	W	DNQ	NH	DNQ				Jinan Olympic Sports Center Stadium
2021	CSL	22	15	6	1	47	16	31	51	1	W	DNQ	NH	DNQ				Jinan Olympic Sports Center Stadium
2022	CSL	34	25	3	6	87	29	58	78	2	W	DNQ	NH	Group				Jinan Olympic Sports Center Stadium

no Division 2 league game in 1959, 1961–63, Shandong Did not compete in 1964;no league games in 1966–72, 1975;

- ^Note 1: in group stage
- ^Note 2: in final group stage
- ^Note 3: in South League
- ^Note 4: Promoted to 1994 Jia-A League
- ^Note 5: Entered the 1996–97 Asian Cup Winners' Cup but withdrew

Key

	China top division
	China second division
	China third division
W	Winners
RU	Runners-up
3	Third place
	Relegated

- Pld = Played
- W = Games won
- D = Games drawn
- L = Games lost
- F = Goals for
- A = Goals against
- Pts = Points
- Pos = Final position
- DNQ = Did not qualify
- DNE = Did not enter
- NH = Not Held
- - = Does Not Exist
- R1 = Round 1
- R2 = Round 2
- R3 = Round 3
- R4 = Round 4
- F = Final
- SF = Semi-finals
- QF = Quarter-finals
- R16 = Round of 16
- Group = Group stage
- GS2 = Second Group stage
- QR1 = First Qualifying Round
- QR2 = Second Qualifying Round
- QR3 = Third Qualifying Round

=== International results ===
As of February 2024

Season	Competition	Round	Opposition	Score
2000–01	Asian Club Championship	Second round	(Singapore) Home United	3–0 (H), 3–1 (A)
2000–01	Asian Club Championship	Quarter-finals	(Indonesia) PSM Makassar	3–1 (N)
2000–01	Asian Club Championship	Quarter-finals	(Japan) Júbilo Iwata	2–6 (N)
2000–01	Asian Club Championship	Quarter-finals	(South Korea) Suwon Samsung Bluewings	0–6 (N)
2005	AFC Champions League	Group F	(Japan) Yokohama F. Marinos	1–0 (A), 2–1 (H)
2005	AFC Champions League	Group F	(Thailand) BEC Tero	1–0 (H), 4–0 (A)
2005	AFC Champions League	Group F	(Indonesia) PSM Makassar	1–0 (A), 6–1 (H)
2005	AFC Champions League	Quarter-finals	(Saudi Arabia) Al-Ittihad	1–1 (H), 2–7 (A)
2007	AFC Champions League	Group G	(Australia) Adelaide United	1–0 (A), 2–2 (H)
2007	AFC Champions League	Group G	(South Korea) Seongnam Ilhwa Chunma	2–1 (H), 0–3 (A)
2007	AFC Champions League	Group G	(Vietnam) Đồng Tâm Long An	4–0 (H), 3–2 (A)
2007	A3 Champions Cup	Table	(Japan) Urawa Red Diamonds	4–3 (N)
2007	A3 Champions Cup	Table	(China) Shanghai Shenhua	2–1 (N)
2007	A3 Champions Cup	Table	(South Korea) Seongnam Ilhwa Chunma	1–2 (N)
2009	AFC Champions League	Group F	(Japan) Gamba Osaka	0–3 (A), 0–1 (H)
2009	AFC Champions League	Group F	(Indonesia) Sriwijaya	5–0 (H), 2–4 (A)
2009	AFC Champions League	Group F	(South Korea) FC Seoul	2–0 (H), 1–1 (A)
2009	Pan-Pacific Championship	Semi-finals	(South Korea) Suwon Samsung Bluewings	0–1 (N)
2009	Pan-Pacific Championship	Third-place match	(Japan) Oita Trinita	1–2 (N)
2010	AFC Champions League	Group H	(Japan) Sanfrecce Hiroshima	1–0 (A), 2–3 (H)
2010	AFC Champions League	Group H	(Australia) Adelaide United	0–2 (H), 1–0 (A)
2010	AFC Champions League	Group H	(South Korea) Pohang Steelers	0–1 (A), 1–2 (H)
2011	AFC Champions League	Group G	(South Korea) Jeonbuk Hyundai Motors	0–1 (A), 1–2 (H)
2011	AFC Champions League	Group G	(Japan) Cerezo Osaka	2–0 (H), 0–4 (A)
2011	AFC Champions League	Group G	(Indonesia) Arema	1–1 (A), 5–0 (H)
2014	AFC Champions League	Group E	(Thailand) Buriram United	1–1 (H), 0–1 (A)
2014	AFC Champions League	Group E	(Japan) Cerezo Osaka	3–1 (A), 1–2 (H)
2014	AFC Champions League	Group E	(South Korea) Pohang Steelers	2–2 (A), 2–4 (H)
2015	AFC Champions League	Group E	(Vietnam) Becamex Bình Dương	3–2 (A), 3–1 (H)
2015	AFC Champions League	Group E	(South Korea) Jeonbuk Hyundai Motors	1–4 (H), 1–4 (A)
2015	AFC Champions League	Group E	(Japan) Kashiwa Reysol	1–2 (A), 4–4 (H)
2016	AFC Champions League	Group F	(Japan) Sanfrecce Hiroshima	2–1 (A), 1–0 (H)
2016	AFC Champions League	Group F	(Thailand) Buriram United	3–0 (H), 0–0 (A)
2016	AFC Champions League	Group F	(South Korea) FC Seoul	1–4 (H), 0–0 (A)
2016	AFC Champions League	Round of 16	(Australia) Sydney FC	1–1 (H), 2–2 (A)
2016	AFC Champions League	Quarter-finals	(South Korea) FC Seoul	1–3 (A), 1–1 (H)
2019	AFC Champions League	Play-off Round	(Vietnam) Hanoi FC	4–1 (H)
2019	AFC Champions League	Group E	(South Korea) Gyeongnam FC	2–1 (H), 2–2 (A)
2019	AFC Champions League	Group E	(Japan) Kashima Antlers	2–2 (H), 2–1 (A)
2019	AFC Champions League	Group E	(Malaysia) Johor Darul Ta'zim	2–1 (H), 0–1 (A)
2019	AFC Champions League	Round of 16	(China) Guangzhou Evergrande	2–1 (A), 2–3 (H)
2022	AFC Champions League	Group F	(Japan) Urawa Red Diamonds	0–5 (H), 0–5 (A)
2022	AFC Champions League	Group F	(South Korea) Daegu FC	0–4 (A), 0–7 (H)
2022	AFC Champions League	Group F	(Singapore) Lion City Sailors	2–3 (A), 0–0 (H)
2023–24	AFC Champions League	Group G	(Philippines) Kaya F.C.–Iloilo	3–1 (A), 6–1 (H)
2023–24	AFC Champions League	Group G	(Japan) Yokohama F. Marinos	0–1 (H), 0–3 (A)
2023–24	AFC Champions League	Group G	(South Korea) Incheon United	2–0 (A), 3–1 (H)
2023–24	AFC Champions League	Round of 16	(Japan) Kawasaki Frontale	2–3 (H), 4–2 (A)
2023–24	AFC Champions League	Quarter-finals	(Japan) Yokohama F. Marinos	1–2 (H), 0–1 (A)

- On neutral venue, Shandong's score is counted first.

Key

- (H) = Home
- (A) = Away
- (N) = Neutral

== Club ranking ==
=== World ===
As of 9 August 2023

Ranking	Team	Points
156	(Bolivia) The Strongest	507.17
157	(Morocco) AS FAR	506.31
158	(China) Shandong Taishan F.C.	505.87
159	(Turkey) Besiktas JK	503.32
160	(Czech Republic) FC Viktoria Plzen	501.88

=== AFC ===
As of 9 August 2023

Ranking	Team	Points
13	(Saudi Arabia) Al Ittihad Club	572.46
14	(United Arab Emirates) Sharjah FC	540.02
15	(China) Shandong Taishan F.C.	505.87
16	(Saudi Arabia) Al Shabab FC (Riyadh)	488.19
17	(Uzbekistan) Pakhtakor Tashkent FK	480.24

=== Domestic ===
As of 9 August 2023

Ranking	Team	Points
1	(China) Shandong Taishan F.C.	505.87
2	(China) Shanghai Port F.C.	399.79
3	(China) Guangzhou F.C.	364.92
4	(China) Beijing Guoan F.C.	344.94
5	(China) Shanghai Shenhua FC	240.72

== Notable players ==
The players below, had senior international caps for their respective countries.

China PR

- (China) Cui Peng
- (China) Deng Zhuoxiang
- (China) Dai Lin
- (China) Du Wei
- (China) Gao Yao
- (China) Geng Xiaofeng
- (China) Guan Zhen
- (China) Han Peng
- (China) Hao Junmin
- (China) Hao Wei
- (China) Jiao Zhe
- (China) Jin Jingdao
- (China) Liu Binbin
- (China) Li Jinyu
- (China) Li Leilei
- (China) Li Ming
- (China) Li Xiaopeng
- (China) Liu Jindong
- (China) Liu Yang
- (China) Liu Yue
- (China) Lü Zheng
- (China) Shu Chang
- (China) Song Lihui
- (China) Su Maozhen
- (China) Wang Dalei
- (China) Wang Dongning
- (China) Wang Gang
- (China) Wang Liang
- (China) Wang Qiang
- (China) Wang Tong
- (China) Wang Xiaolong
- (China) Wang Yongpo
- (China) Wu Hao
- (China) Xu Yang
- (China) Yang Xu
- (China) Yuan Weiwei
- (China) Zhang Wenzhao
- (China) Zhao Mingjian
- (China) Zheng Zheng
- (China) Zheng Zhi
- (China) Zhou Haibin
- (China) Zong Lei

AFC

- (Australia) Ryan McGowan
- (Lebanon) Roda Antar
- (South Korea) Son Jun-ho

CAF

- (Cape Verde) Ricardo da Silva
- (Ghana) Nii Lamptey
- (Mali) Mourtala Diakité
- (Mozambique) Simão Mate Junior
- (Senegal) Papiss Cissé

CONCACAF

- (Honduras) Julio César de León

CONMEBOL

- (Argentina) Walter Montillo
- (Brazil) Gil
- (Brazil) Jucilei
- (Brazil) Vágner Love
- (Brazil) Márcio Santos
- (Brazil) Diego Tardelli
- (Chile) Gabriel Mendoza
- (Paraguay) Casiano Delvalle
- (Paraguay) José Ortigoza
- (Uruguay) José Herrera
- (Uruguay) Luis Romero
- (Venezuela) Alejandro Cichero

UEFA

- (Belgium) Marouane Fellaini
- (Belarus) Erik Yakhimovich
- (Bosnia and Herzegovina) Amir Osmanović
- (Bulgaria) Predrag Pažin
- (France) Nicolas Ouédec
- (Italy) Graziano Pellè
- (Montenegro) Saša Petrović
- (Romania) Ionel Dănciulescu
- (Romania) Marius Niculae
- (Russia) Sergei Kiriakov
- (Serbia) Nikola Malbaša
- (Serbia) Aleksandar Živković
- (Slovenia) Marinko Galič
- (Ukraine) Serhiy Nahornyak
- (Georgia (country)) Valeri Qazaishvili
