= Aleksei Musatov =

Russian footballer

Personal information
- Full name: Aleksei Alekseyevich Musatov
- Date of birth: 17 October 1980
- Date of death: 13 July 2005 (aged 24)
- Place of death: Bryansk Oblast, Russia
- Height: 1.84 m (6 ft 1/2 in)
- Position: Defender

Youth career
- FC Torpedo-ZIL Moscow

Senior career*
Years	Team	Apps	(Gls)
1998–2000	FC Torpedo-ZIL-M Moscow		
2001–2002	FC Torpedo-ZIL Moscow	4	(0)
2001	→ FC Oka Stupino (loan) (amateur)		
2003	FC Volga Tver	14	(2)
2003	FC Zhenis Astana	1	(0)
2004	FC Reutov	13	(1)
2005	FC Dynamo Bryansk	4	(0)
- * Club domestic league appearances and goals

Aleksei Alekseyevich Musatov (Russian: Алексей Алексеевич Мусатов; 17 October 1980 – 13 July 2005) was a Russian football player.

He died together with his teammate Aleksandr Kovalyov in a traffic accident caused by a moose running onto the road.

== Honours ==
Zhenis Astana

- Kazakhstan Premier League bronze: 2003
