= Sergey Kramarenko (footballer, born 1946) =

Soviet footballer (1946–2008)

Personal information
- Full name: Sergey Sergeyevich Kramarenko
- Date of birth: 20 May 1946
- Place of birth: Ganja, Azerbaijan, USSR
- Date of death: 25 March 2008 (aged 61)
- Place of death: Moscow, Russia
- Height: 1.85 m (6 ft 1 in)
- Position: Goalkeeper

Senior career*
Years	Team	Apps	(Gls)
1964–1975	Neftchi Baku PFC	263	(0)
1976	FC Chornomorets Odesa	26	(0)
1977–1981	Neftchi Baku PFC	69	(0)
1982	FK Khazar Lenkoran		
1983–1984	Neftchi Baku PFC	41	(0)

Managerial career
- 1989: FK Khazar Lenkoran
- 1990: Goyazan Kazakh
- 1993: Neftchi Baku PFC
- * Club domestic league appearances and goals as of 21 June 2008

Sergey Sergeyevich Kramarenko (Russian: Серге́й Серге́евич Крамаренко; 20 May 1946 – 25 March 2008) was a Soviet football player who played the majority of his career in Azerbaijan as a goalkeeper for PFC Neftchi Baku. He was classified as a Master of Sport of the USSR in 1966 following Neftchi's third-place finish in the Soviet Top League that year.

== Biography ==
He was born in Moscow.

Kramarenko holds the Azerbaijani football record for the most games played in the Soviet Top League with 312 caps. The keeper was unofficially named Azerbaijan's Player of the Year once, in 1970.

Following his playing career, which included stints for the Ukrainian side FC Chornomorets Odesa and another Azerbaijani club FK Khazar Lenkoran, Kramarenko became football manager for Khazar Lenkoran and for another, smaller Azerbaijani club. He was named manager of Neftchi in 1993.

He died in March 2008 in Moscow.

He was the father of Dmitry Kramarenko, who was a goalkeeper, most notable for Dinamo Moscow and the Azerbaijan national football team.
