= Boris Ignatyev =

Russian footballer (1940–2026)

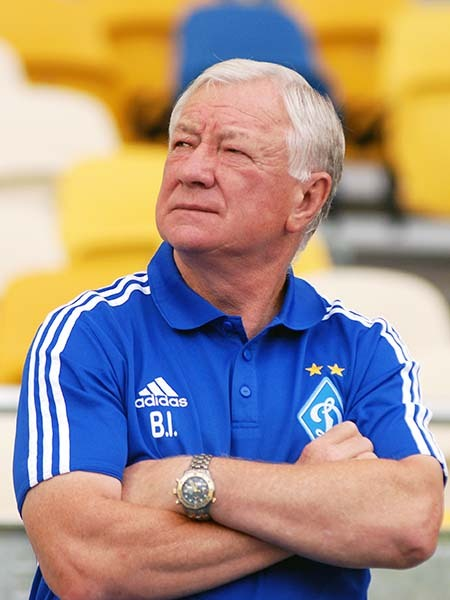
- Ignatyev in 2012

Personal information
- Full name: Boris Petrovich Ignatyev
- Date of birth: 5 December 1940
- Place of birth: Moscow, Russian SFSR, Soviet Union
- Date of death: 27 January 2026 (aged 85)
- Height: 1.75 m (5 ft 9 in)
- Position: Midfielder

Youth career
- 1956–1959: Spartak Moscow

Senior career*
Years	Team	Apps	(Gls)
1960	Dynamo Moscow	0	(0)
1960–1961	Zenit Izhevsk		
1962	Raketa Sormovo	27	(1)
1963–1967	Volga Gorky	138	(2)
1968–1969	Dynamo Makhachkala	53	(3)
1970	Meteor Zhukovsky		
1971	Dynamo Tselinograd		
1972	Stroitel Ufa		

Managerial career
- 1973–1975: Torpedo Vladimir
- 1976–1989: USSR U18
- 1989–1990: UAE (club team)
- 1990: Iraq Olympic
- 1990–1991: USSR Olympic
- 1992–1993: Russia U21
- 1992–1996: Russia (assistant)
- 1996–1998: Russia
- 1998–2000: Torpedo-ZIL Moscow
- 2001: Shandong Luneng
- 2002: Alania Vladikavkaz (consultant)
- 2003: Lokomotiv Moscow (sports director)
- 2004: Saturn Moscow Oblast
- 2006: Dynamo Moscow (sports director)
- 2007–2008: Saturn Moscow Oblast (assistant)
- 2009: Dynamo Kyiv (assistant)
- 2009–2010: Lokomotiv Moscow (assistant)
- 2010–2012: Dynamo Kyiv (assistant)
- 2012–2013: Torpedo Moscow
- 2013–2018: Torpedo Moscow (VP)
- * Club domestic league appearances and goals

Boris Petrovich Ignatyev (Russian: Борис Петрович Игнатьев, 5 December 1940 – 27 January 2026) was a Russian football manager and player.

== Club career ==
As a footballer, Ignatyev spent only one season in the Soviet Top League, with Volga Gorky in 1964. He played as a midfielder.

== Coaching career ==
As a manager, Ignatyev won the UEFA European Under-18 Championship in 1988 with the Soviet Union. Between 1996 and 1998 he coached the Russia national team.

== Death ==
Ignatyev died from stomach cancer on 27 January 2026, at the age of 85.
