= Dmitry Kramarenko =

Azerbaijani footballer (born 1974)

Dmitriy Kramarenko
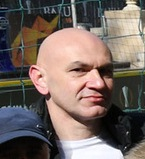
- Dimitri Kramarenko

Personal information
- Full name: Dmitriy Sergeyevich Kramarenko
- Date of birth: 12 September 1974 (age 52)
- Place of birth: Lenkoran, Azerbaijan SSR, Soviet Union
- Height: 1.86 m (6 ft 1 in)
- Position: Goalkeeper

Team information
- Current team: CSKA Moscow (GK coach)

Senior career*
Years	Team	Apps	(Gls)
1991	Dynamo Baku	3	(0)
1992	Neftchi Baku	31	(0)
1993–1994	Dynamo Moscow	4	(0)
1995	Torpedo Moscow	4	(0)
1996–1997	Alania Vladikavkaz	31	(0)
1998–2001	Dynamo Moscow	45	(0)
2002–2003	CSKA Moscow	3	(0)
2004	Baltika Kaliningrad	15	(0)
2005	Karvan	12	(0)
2006	Terek Grozny	16	(0)
2007–2010	Khazar Lankaran	37	(0)
2010–2013	Inter Baku	11	(0)
2012–2013	→ Simurq (loan)	18	(0)
Total		230	(0)

International career
1992–2005	Azerbaijan	33	(0)
1994–1995	Russia U-21	2	(0)

Managerial career
- 2013–2015: Gabala (goalkeeper coach)
- 2015–2016: Neftchi Baku (goalkeeper coach)
- 2017–2018: CSKA Moscow (academy coach)
- 2020–2022: Azerbaijan (goalkeeper coach)
- 2021–: CSKA Moscow (goalkeeper coach)
- * Club domestic league appearances and goals

Dmitriy Sergeyevich Kramarenko (born 12 September 1974) is an Azerbaijani football coach and a former goalkeeper. He is a goalkeepers coach at CSKA Moscow.

== International career ==
He made his debut for Azerbaijan national football team in 1992 at the age of 18, but then was not called up to the squad for an extended period. Kramarenko then switched to representing Russia and appeared in two friendlies for the Russia national under-21 football team in 1994 and 1995. He returned to Azerbaijan national team in 1998 and eventually collected 33 caps.

== Personal life ==
His father is the former long-time goalkeeper for PFC Neftchi Baku, Sergey Kramarenko. Kramarenko also holds Russian citizenship. One of his twin daughters is Lala Kramarenko, a rhythmic gymnast competing for Russia.

== Career statistics ==
Club performance			League		Cup		Continental		Total	
Season	Club	League	Apps	Goals	Apps	Goals	Apps	Goals	Apps	Goals
1991	Dynamo Baku	Soviet Second League B III Zone	3	0			-		3	0
1992	Neftchi Baku	Azerbaijan Top League	31	0			-		31	0
1993	Dynamo Moscow	RFPL	1	0			-		1	0
1994	Dynamo Moscow	RFPL	3	0			-		3	0
1995	Torpedo Moscow	RFPL	4	0			-		4	0
1996	Alania Vladikavkaz	RFPL	22	0			-		22	0
1997	Alania Vladikavkaz	RFPL	9	0			-		9	0
1998	Dynamo Moscow	RFPL	2	0			-		2	0
1999	Dynamo Moscow	RFPL	10	0			-		10	0
2000	Dynamo Moscow	RFPL	21	0			-		21	0
2001	Dynamo Moscow	RFPL	12	0			-		12	0
2002	CSKA Moscow	RFPL	3	0	0	0	0	0	3	0
2003	CSKA Moscow	RFPL	0	0			-		0	0
2004	Baltika Kaliningrad	RFNL	15	0			-		15	0
2004–05	Karvan	Azerbaijan Top League	16	0			-		16	0
2005–06	Karvan	Azerbaijan Top League	12	0			0	0	12	0
2006	Terek Grozny	RFNL	16	0			-		16	0
2006–07	Khazar Lankaran	Azerbaijan Premier League	5	0			-		5	0
2007–08	Khazar Lankaran	Azerbaijan Premier League	9	0			0	0	9	0
2008–09	Khazar Lankaran	Azerbaijan Premier League	20	0			2	0	22	0
2009–10	Khazar Lankaran	Azerbaijan Premier League	3	0	1	0	-		4	0
2010–11	Khazar Lankaran	Azerbaijan Premier League	0	0			0	0	0	0
2010–11	Inter Baku	Azerbaijan Premier League	11	0	2	0	-		13	0
2011–12	Inter Baku	Azerbaijan Premier League	0	0	0	0	-		0	0
2011–12	Simurq (loan)	Azerbaijan Premier League	14	0	0	0	-		14	0
2012–13	Simurq (loan)	Azerbaijan Premier League	4	0	0	0	-		4	0
Total	Soviet Union		3	0			-		3	0
Total	Azerbaijan		125	0			2	0	127	0
Total	Russia		118	0			-		118	0
Career total			246	0			2	0	248	0

== National team statistics ==
Azerbaijan national team
Year	Apps	Goals
1992	1	0
1993	0	0
1994	0	0
1995	0	0
1996	0	0
1997	0	0
1998	2	0
1999	7	0
2000	3	0
2001	2	0
2002	2	0
2003	3	0
2004	7	0
2005	6	0
Total	33	0
