= Vadim Nikonov =

Soviet footballer and Russian coach

Personal information
- Full name: Vadim Stanislavovich Nikonov
- Date of birth: 9 August 1948 (age 78)
- Place of birth: Moscow, USSR
- Positions: Forward; midfielder

Youth career
- Serp i Molot Plant Moscow

Senior career*
Years	Team	Apps	(Gls)
1967–1975	FC Torpedo Moscow	161	(39)
1976–1977	CSKA Moscow	38	(3)
1977–1978	FC Torpedo Moscow	12	(1)
1979	FC Fakel Voronezh	36	(10)
1980–1982	FC Spartak Ryazan	65	(21)

International career
1973	USSR	4	(0)

Managerial career
- 1986–1996: FC Torpedo Moscow (assistant)
- 1998: FC Torpedo-2
- 1999–2001: FC Torpedo-ZIL-d Moscow
- 2001–2002: FC Torpedo-ZIL Moscow
- 2004–2010: Russia U-17 (assistant)
- * Club domestic league appearances and goals

Vadim Stanislavovich Nikonov (Russian: Вадим Станиславович Никонов; born 9 August 1948) is a retired Soviet football player and a current Russian coach.

== Honours ==
- Soviet Cup winner: 1968, 1972.
- Top 33 players year-end list: 1974.

== International career ==
Nikonov made his debut for USSR on 28 March 1973 in a friendly against Bulgaria.
