= Jovica Lakić =

Serbian footballer

Personal information
- Date of birth: September 4, 1974 (age 52)
- Place of birth: Kikinda, SFR Yugoslavia
- Height: 1.79 m (5 ft 10 in)
- Position: Midfielder

Senior career*
Years	Team	Apps	(Gls)
1996–1998	OFK Kikinda	45	(1)
1998–1999	Beograd	23	(1)
1999–2000	Milicionar	20	(2)
2000–2001	Obilić	26	(3)
2001	Torpedo Moscow	1	(0)
2002	Torpedo-ZIL	15	(0)
2003	OFK Kikinda	11	(2)
2004	Mladost Apatin	8	(2)
Total		149	(11)

Managerial career
- OFK Kikinda (youth)
- 2017-2018: Bečej
- * Club domestic league appearances and goals

Jovica Lakić (Serbian Cyrillic: Јовица Лакић; born September 4, 1974) is a retired Serbian professional footballer.

During his career he played for the Serbian clubs OFK Kikinda, FK Beograd, FK Milicionar, FK Obilić and FK Mladost Apatin and the Russian clubs FC Torpedo Moscow and FC Torpedo-ZIL Moscow.
