= Liu Qiwei =

Chinese footballer

Personal information
- Date of birth: 21 December 2005 (age 20)
- Place of birth: Qingdao, Shandong, China
- Height: 1.88 m (6 ft 2 in)
- Position: Goalkeeper

Team information
- Current team: Shandong Taishan
- Number: 36

Youth career
- Shandong Taishan Youth

Senior career*
Years	Team	Apps	(Gls)
2024–	Shandong Taishan B	46	(0)
2026–	Shandong Taishan	2	(0)

International career^{‡}
2024	China U19	3	(0)
2025	China U20	6	(0)
2026–	China U23	2	(0)
- * Club domestic league appearances and goals as of 19 November 2026 ‡ National team caps and goals as of 28 May 2026

Liu Qiwei (simplified Chinese: 刘骐玮; traditional Chinese: 劉騏瑋; pinyin: Liú Qíwěi; born 21 December 2005) is a Chinese professional footballer who plays as a goalkeeper for Chinese Super League club Shandong Taishan.

== Club career ==
=== Shandong Taishan B ===
Liu played for Shandong Taishan B in China League Two. In the 2025 season, he made 25 appearances and recorded 1 assist.

=== Shandong Taishan ===
On 21 April 2026, Liu made his Chinese Super League debut in a 2–1 away victory over Tianjin Jinmen Tiger, starting as the goalkeeper. He wore the number 36 jersey in the match.

== International career ==
In July 2024, Liu was called up to the China U19 national team for the fourth training camp of 2024. In June 2024, he helped China U19 win the Weinan International Football Invitational Tournament, defeating South Korea U19 2–0 in the final match on 10 June. During the tournament, Liu started against Uzbekistan U19 on 8 June, making several saves to keep a clean sheet in a 0–0 draw.

In February 2025, Liu represented China U20 in the 2025 AFC U-20 Asian Cup. On 16 February 2025, after China U20 defeated Kyrgyzstan U20 5–2 to advance from the group stage, Liu stated in an interview that the team needed to improve their reading of the game during transitions from attack to defense.

In May 2026, Liu was called up to the China U23 national team for the second training camp of 2026, in preparation for the 2026 Aichi-Nagoya Asian Games.

== Career statistics ==
=== Club ===
As of 21 April 2026

Appearances and goals by club, season and competition
Club	Season	League			National Cup		Continental		Other		Total	
Club	Season	Division	Apps	Goals	Apps	Goals	Apps	Goals	Apps	Goals	Apps	Goals
Shandong Taishan B	2024	China League Two	20	0	0	0	—		—		20	0
Shandong Taishan B	2025	China League Two	25	0	0	0	—		—		25	0
Shandong Taishan	2026	Chinese Super League	1	0	0	0	—		—		1	0
Career total			46	0	0	0	0	0	0	0	46	0

== Honours ==
China U19

- Weinan International Football Invitational Tournament: 2024

== Individual ==
- China Youth Football League (U19 Group) Best Goalkeeper: 2024
