= Aleksei Triputen =

Russian footballer

Personal information
- Full name: Aleksei Nikolayevich Triputen
- Date of birth: 6 July 1982 (age 44)
- Place of birth: Odintsovsky District, Russian SFSR
- Height: 1.80 m (5 ft 11 in)
- Position: Midfielder

Senior career*
Years	Team	Apps	(Gls)
2001	FC Torpedo-ZIL Moscow	3	(0)
2002	PFC CSKA Moscow	9	(0)
2003	FC Torpedo-Metallurg Moscow	2	(0)
2003	FC Sokol Saratov	11	(0)

International career
2002	Russia U-21	2	(0)
- * Club domestic league appearances and goals

Aleksei Nikolayevich Triputen (Russian: Алексей Николаевич Трипутень; born 6 July 1982) is a Russian retired professional footballer.

== Club career ==
He made his professional debut in the Russian Premier League in 2001 for FC Torpedo-ZIL Moscow.

After retirement, he works as a radio commentator.

== Honours ==
- Russian Premier League runner-up: 2002.
- Russian Cup winner: 2002.
