= Andrei Paukov =

Russian footballer

Personal information
- Full name: Andrei Vladislavovich Paukov
- Date of birth: 9 December 1976 (age 49)
- Place of birth: Oryol, Russian SFSR
- Height: 1.82 m (5 ft 11 1/2 in)
- Position: Goalkeeper

Youth career
- SDYuShOR-3 Oryol

Senior career*
Years	Team	Apps	(Gls)
1993	FC Oryol	0	(0)
1994–1995	Progresul Briceni	12	(0)
1996–1999	FC Mozdok	95	(0)
1999–2001	FC Avtodor Vladikavkaz	54	(0)
2001–2002	FC Alania Vladikavkaz	4	(0)
2002	FC Avtodor Vladikavkaz	0	(0)
2003	FC Lukoil Chelyabinsk	33	(0)
2005	FC Volgar-Gazprom Astrakhan	8	(0)
2008	FC Rusichi-2 Oryol		
2008	FC Abinsk (amateur)		
- * Club domestic league appearances and goals

Andrei Vladislavovich Paukov (Russian: Андрей Владиславович Пауков; born 9 December 1976) is a former Russian football player.

== Club career ==
He made his Russian Premier League debut for FC Alania Vladikavkaz on 18 July 2001 in a game against FC Dynamo Moscow.
