= Igor Piyuk =

Russian footballer

Personal information
- Full name: Igor Vasilyevich Piyuk
- Date of birth: 13 May 1982 (age 44)
- Place of birth: Moscow, Russian SFSR
- Height: 1.92 m (6 ft 3 1/2 in)
- Position: Forward

Senior career*
Years	Team	Apps	(Gls)
2001	FC Torpedo-ZIL Moscow	20	(6)
2002	PFC CSKA Moscow	1	(0)
2002	FC Torpedo-ZIL Moscow	12	(1)
2003	FC Chernomorets Novorossiysk	12	(0)
2004	FC Fakel Voronezh	27	(9)
2005–2006	FC KAMAZ Naberezhnye Chelny	35	(9)
2006–2007	FC SKA-Energiya Khabarovsk	30	(6)
2007–2009	FC Avangard Kursk	64	(16)
2010	FC SKA-Energiya Khabarovsk	23	(1)
2011–2012	FC Rusichi Oryol	10	(1)

International career
2002	Russia U-21	1	(0)
- * Club domestic league appearances and goals

Igor Vasilyevich Piyuk (Russian: Игорь Васильевич Пиюк; born 13 May 1982) is a Russian former professional footballer.

== Club career ==
He made his debut in the Russian Premier League in 2001 for FC Torpedo-ZIL Moscow.

== Honours ==
- Russian Premier League runner-up: 2002.
- Russian Cup winner: 2002.
