= Alexandr Covalenco =

Association football player

Alexandru Covalenco
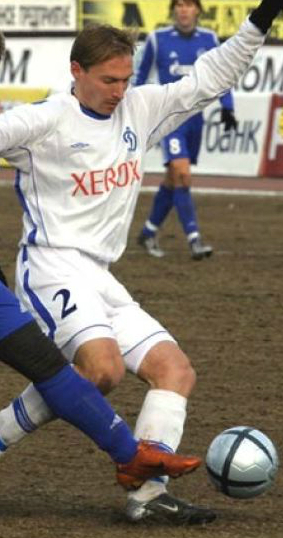
- Covalenco with Dynamo Moscow in 2005

Personal information
- Full name: Alexandru Covalenco
- Date of birth: 25 March 1978 (age 48)
- Place of birth: Tiraspol, Moldavian SSR, Soviet Union
- Height: 1.81 m (5 ft 11 in)
- Position: Defender

Senior career*
| Years | Team | Apps | (Gls) |
| 1996–2001 | Tiligul Tiraspol | 132 | (1) |
| 2002–2005 | Dynamo Moscow | 61 | (0) |
| 2006 | Volgar-Gazprom Astrakhan | 12 | (0) |
| 2007 | Rotor Volgograd | 14 | (0) |
| 2007–2008 | SKA-Energia Khabarovsk | 35 | (1) |
| 2008 | Sportakademklub Moscow | 13 | (0) |
| 2009 | Chernomorets Novorossiysk | 16 | (0) |
| 2010 | Torpedo Moscow | 4 | (0) |
| 2010–2011 | Neman Grodno | 37 | (0) |
| 2012 | Tighina Bender | 11 | (1) |
| 2012–2013 | Dinamo-Auto Tiraspol | 24 | (2) |

International career
| 2000–2005 | Moldova | 35 | (0) |
- * Club domestic league appearances and goals

Alexandru Covalenco (Russian: Александр Коваленко, born 25 March 1978) is a Moldovan retired footballer.

== Career ==
In February 2002, he joined Dynamo Moscow, signing a 5-year contract.

He was a member of the Moldova national team for 2002 and 2006 World Cup qualifying.
