= Vyacheslav Dayev =

Russian footballer

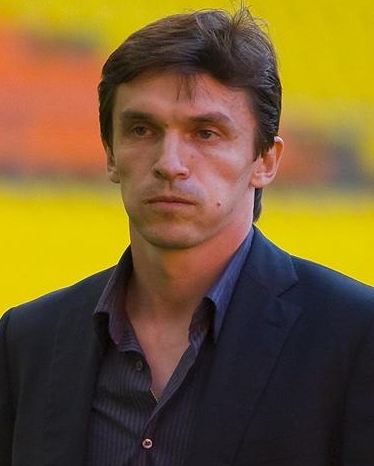
- Dayev with Torpedo Moscow in 2008

Personal information
- Full name: Vyacheslav Yevgenyevich Dayev
- Date of birth: 6 September 1972 (age 54)
- Place of birth: Tula, Soviet Union
- Height: 1.83 m (6 ft 0 in)
- Position: Defender

Team information
- Current team: Academy Dynamo Moscow

Youth career
- Tula machine-building factory

Senior career*
Years	Team	Apps	(Gls)
1991	Znamya Truda; Orekhovo-Zuyevo	25	(5)
1992	Iskra Smolensk	10	(1)
1993–1994	Kristall Smolensk	56	(1)
1995	Krylia Sovetov Samara	29	(0)
1996–1998	Baltika Kaliningrad	92	(3)
1999–2001	Torpedo Moscow	87	(8)
2002	CSKA Moscow	22	(1)
2003–2004	Shinnik Yaroslavl	32	(1)
Total		353	(20)

International career
2001–2002	Russia	8	(0)

Managerial career
- 2005–2006: FShM Moscow
- 2007: Torpedo Moscow (assistant)
- 2007: Torpedo Moscow (caretaker)
- 2007–2008: Torpedo Moscow (assistant)
- 2008: Torpedo Moscow (caretaker)
- 2008–2009: Torpedo Moscow
- 2011: Russia U-19
- 2013: FShM Moscow
- 2014–2017: Academy Lokomotiv Moscow
- 2017–2020: Lokomotiv Moscow (U-21 assistant)
- 2020–2025: Academy Torpedo Moscow
- 2025–: Academy Dynamo Moscow
- * Club domestic league appearances and goals

Vyacheslav Yevgenyevich Dayev (Russian: Вячеслав Евгеньевич Даев; born 6 September 1972) is a Russian association football coach and a former player.

== Playing career ==
He has played eight matches for Russia national football team and was a participant at the 2002 FIFA World Cup.

== Coaching career ==
After finishing his playing career he worked a children's coach in Torpedo Moscow football school. In 2007, he was appointed as a caretaker manager at Torpedo after Georgi Yartsev was sacked. Daev was remaining at that position for five weeks until he was replaced by Ravil Sabitov.

Next year Ravil Sabitov was sacked and Dayev became Torpedo Moscow caretaker again. He went on to manage the Russia national under-19 football team.

== Honours ==
- Russian Cup winner in 2002
