= FC Torpedo-ZIL Moscow =

Torpedo-ZIL
- Full name: Football Club Torpedo-ZIL
- Nickname(s): Avtozavodtsy (Automobile plant workers)
- Founded: 1997; 28 years ago
- Dissolved: 2004; 21 years ago (became FC Moscow)
- Ground: Eduard Streltsov Stadium, Moscow
- Capacity: 13,200
- League: Russian Premier League
- 2002: 14th
Home colours	Away colours

FC Torpedo-ZIL (Russian: Футбольный клуб Торпедо-ЗИЛ) was a Russian football club from Moscow.

== History ==
Torpedo-Metallurg logo (2003–2004)

The first Torpedo-ZIL logo.

The team was founded in 1997 after Torpedo Moscow, which played in the Russian Top Division, became a property of SC Luzhniki and was not related to the automobile plant anymore. Soon afterwards ZiL decided to revive their own team.

Torpedo-ZIL made a debut in the Third Division in 1997. The club won promotion to the Premier League in 2000. In both 2001 and 2002, Torpedo-ZIL finished 14th out of 16 teams. In the beginning of 2003, due to inability to finance a Premier League team, ZIL had to sell first 55 percent, and two months later all remaining stock to Norilsk Nickel. Metallurgy giant renamed the team FC Torpedo-Metallurg, and a year later used it to form a new club, FC Moscow. At the same time, ZIL created another team in the Third Division which was originally known as FC Torpedo-RG and was later renamed back to FC Torpedo-ZIL Moscow. That team has also since been disbanded.

=== Domestic history ===
Season	Div.	Pos.	Pl.	W	D	L	GS	GA	P	Domestic Cup	Europe	Top scorer (league)	Head coach
1997	4th, Zone 3	3	40	23	8	9	77	29	77			(Russia) Lavrentyev – 17	(Russia) Petrenko
1998	3rd, "Center"	1	40	28	6	6	90	30	90	Round of 128		(Russia) Snigiryov – 32	(Russia) Petrenko (Russia) Ignatyev
1999	2nd	4	42	23	13	6	67	27	82	Round of 32		(Russia) A. Smirnov – 11	(Russia) Ignatyev
2000	2nd	2	38	24	8	6	62	28	80	Round of 64		(Russia) Lebed' – 10	(Russia) Ignatyev
2001	1st	14	30	7	10	13	22	35	31	Round of 32		(Russia) Piyuk – 6	(Ukraine) Kucherevsky
2002	1st	14	30	6	10	14	20	39	28	Quarterfinals		(Russia) D. Smirnov – 7	(Russia) Nikonov
2003	1st	14	30	8	5	17	25	39	29	Round of 32		(Ukraine) Monaryov – 8	(Belarus) Aleinikov (Russia) Ivanov (Russia) Ignatenko
