= 1994–95 Russian Cup =

Tournament details
- Country: Russia

Final positions
- Champions: Dynamo Moscow
- Runners-up: Rotor Volgograd

The 1994–95 Russian Cup was the third season of the Russian football knockout tournament since the dissolution of Soviet Union.

== First round ==
| Team 1 | Score | Team 2 |
|---|---|---|
8 May 1994
| Sakhalin Kholmsk | 4–2 (a.e.t.) | SKA Khabarovsk |
| Shakhtyor Artyom | w/o | Lokomotiv Ussuriysk |
| Metallurg Krasnoyarsk | 3–0 | Dynamo Yakutsk |
| Amur Blagoveshchensk | 0–0 (a.e.t.) (4–2 p) | Amur Komsomolsk-na-Amure |
| Torpedo Izhevsk | w/o | KamAZavtotsentr Naberezhnye Chelny |
| Politekhnik-92 Barnaul | 0–2 | Dynamo Barnaul |
| Metallurg Novokuznetsk | 2–0 | Tom Tomsk |
| Dynamo Omsk | 2–0 | Agan Raduzhny |
| Angara Angarsk | w/o | Kristall Neryungri |
| Dynamo Kemerovo | w/o | Chkalovets Novosibirsk |
| Shakhtyor Kiselyovsk | 1–2 | Torpedo Rubtsovsk |
9 May 1994
| FC Metallurg Stary Oskol | w/o | Salyut Belgorod |
| Metallurg Krasny Sulin | 0–2 | Fakel Voronezh |
| Shakhtyor Shakhty | 1–2 | Metallurg Lipetsk |
| Istochnik Rostov-on-Don | w/o | Torpedo Taganrog |
| SKD Samara | 2–1 | Yudzhin Samara |
| Torpedo Arzamas | 3–0 | Svetotekhnika Saransk |
| Sodovik Sterlitamak | 0–2 | Estel Ufa |
| Volga Balakovo | 1–3 | Devon Oktyabrsky |
| Gazovik Orenburg | 2–0 | Metallurg Novotroitsk |
| Metiznik Magnitogorsk | 2–4 | Metallurg Magnitogorsk |
| Dynamo Makhachkala | 1–2 (a.e.t.) | Anzhi Makhachkala |
| Argo Kaspiysk | 5–1 | Terek Grozny |
| Iriston Vladikavkaz | 3–0 | Avtozapchast Baksan |
| Astrateks Astrakhan | 2–8 | Torpedo Volzhsky |
| SKA Rostov-on-Don | 2–2 (a.e.t.) (2–4 p) | Atommash Volgodonsk |
| Zvezda Gorodishche | 4–1 | Avangard Kamyshin |
| Energiya Pyatigorsk | w/o | Nart Cherkessk |
| Beshtau Lermontov | 1–2 | Kavkazkabel Prokhladny |
| Saturn Ramenskoye | 3–0 | Gigant Voskresensk |
| Oka Kolomna | 1–2 | Avangard-Kortek Kolomna |
| Kosmos Dolgoprudny | 2–0 | Titan Reutov |
| Khimik Uvarovo | 0–2 | Spartak Tambov |
| Prometey-Dynamo Saint Petersburg | 0–1 | Erzi Petrozavodsk |
| FC Gatchina | w/o | Spartak-Arktikbank Arkhangelsk |
| Bulat Cherepovets | 1–1 (a.e.t.) (4–1 p) | Dynamo Vologda |
| Mashinostroitel Pskov | 3–4 (a.e.t.) | Lokomotiv Saint Petersburg |
| Spartak Kostroma | 1–3 | Tekstilshchik Ivanovo |
| Kraneks Ivanovo | 0–1 | Vympel Rybinsk |
| Trion-Volga Tver | 3–0 | FC Orekhovo |
| Gornyak Kachkanar | 2–3 | Uralets Nizhny Tagil |
| Dynamo Perm | 4–0 | Vyatka Kirov |
| Zenit Izhevsk | 1–1 (a.e.t.) (6–5 p) | Energiya Chaykovsky |
| Rekord Aleksandrov | 2–5 | Spartak Shchyolkovo |
| TRASKO Moscow | 0–1 | Torpedo-MKB Mytishchi |
| Torgmash Lyubertsy | 2–3 | FC Obninsk |
| Chertanovo Moscow | 1–1 (a.e.t.) (4–5 p) | Mosenergo Moscow |
| Elektron Vyatskiye Polyany | 0–2 | Gazovik-Gazprom Izhevsk |
| Progress Zelenodolsk | 1–3 | Druzhba Yoshkar-Ola |
| Azamat Cheboksary | w/o | Rubin Kazan |
| Iskra Smolensk | 0–1 | Kristall Smolensk |
| Dynamo Bryansk | 0–0 (a.e.t.) (4–1 p) | Turbostroitel Kaluga |
| Avangard Kursk | 2–2 (a.e.t.) (7–6 p) | FC Oryol |
| Arsenal Tula | 1–0 | Torpedo Ryazan |
| Torpedo Pavlovo | 3–2 | Khimik Dzerzhinsk |
| Tekstilshchik Isheyevka | 0–0 (a.e.t.) (4–1 p) | Lada Dimitrovgrad |
| Zavolzhye Engels | w/o | Irgiz Balakovo |
| Torpedo Armavir | 0–4 | Kuban Krasnodar |
| Kuban Slavyansk-na-Kubani | 2–1 | Venets Gulkevichi |
| Khimik Belorechensk | 1–0 | Kolos Krasnodar |
| Niva Slavyansk-na-Kubani | 1–2 | Spartak Anapa |

== Second round ==
| Team 1 | Score | Team 2 |
|---|---|---|
29 May 1994
| Fakel Voronezh | 0–1 (a.e.t.) | Salyut Belgorod |
| Torpedo Taganrog | 3–1 | Metallurg Lipetsk |
| SKD Samara | 0–3 | Torpedo Arzamas |
| Estel Ufa | 0–2 | Devon Oktyabrsky |
| Gazovik Orenburg | 0–1 | Torpedo Miass |
| Metallurg Magnitogorsk | w/o | Zenit Chelyabinsk |
| Anzhi Makhachkala | 3–0 | Argo Kaspiysk |
| Iriston Vladikavkaz | 1–0 | Spartak Nalchik |
| Sakhalin Kholmsk | 2–1 | Luch Vladivostok |
| Shakhtyor Artyom | w/o | Okean Nakhodka |
| Metallurg Krasnoyarsk | 0–2 | Zvezda Irkutsk |
| Amur Blagoveshchensk | 4–2 | Lokomotiv Chita |
| Torpedo Volzhsky | 2–1 | Volgar Astrakhan |
| Atommash Volgodonsk | 2–0 | Zvezda Gorodishche |
| Druzhba Budyonnovsk | 2–3 | Energiya Pyatigorsk |
| Kavkazkabel Prokhladny | 4–1 | Olimp Kislovodsk |
| Avangard-Kortek Kolomna | 1–1 (a.e.t.) (4–6 p) | Saturn Ramenskoye |
| Spartak Tambov | w/o | Kosmos Dolgoprudny |
| Erzi Petrozavodsk | 1–1 (a.e.t.) (0–3 p) | FC Gatchina |
| Lokomotiv Saint Petersburg | 1–0 | Bulat Cherepovets |
| Tekstilshchik Ivanovo | 3–1 | Vympel Rybinsk |
| Trion-Volga Tver | 4–2 | Vest Kaliningrad |
| Uralets Nizhny Tagil | 3–1 | Sibir Kurgan |
| Dynamo Perm | 4–1 | Zenit Izhevsk |
| Spartak Shchyolkovo | 0–0 (a.e.t.) (4–1 p) | Torpedo-MKB Mytishchi |
| Mosenergo Moscow | 4–1 | FC Obninsk |
| Gazovik-Gazprom Izhevsk | 2–0 | KamAZavtotsentr Naberezhnye Chelny |
| Druzhba Yoshkar-Ola | 2–1 | Rubin Kazan |
| Kristall Smolensk | 2–0 | Dynamo Bryansk |
| Arsenal Tula | 4–0 | Avangard Kursk |
| Tekstilshchik Isheyevka | 4–0 | Torpedo Pavlovo |
| Zenit Penza | 1–0 | Irgiz Balakovo |
| Dynamo Barnaul | 1–0 | Metallurg Novokuznetsk |
| Dynamo Omsk | 0–2 | Irtysh Omsk |
| Chkalovets Novosibirsk | 2–1 | Angara Angarsk |
| Torpedo Rubtsovsk | 2–1 | Zarya Leninsk-Kuznetsky |
| Kuban Krasnodar | 3–2 | Kuban Slavyansk-na-Kubani |
| Spartak Anapa | 2–0 | Khimik Belorechensk |

== Third round ==
| Team 1 | Score | Team 2 |
|---|---|---|
25 June 1994
| Salyut Belgorod | 1–4 | Torpedo Taganrog |
26 June 1994
| Chkalovets Novosibirsk | 8–3 | Torpedo Rubtsovsk |
27 June 1994
| Devon Oktyabrsky | 0–1 | Torpedo Arzamas |
| Torpedo Miass | 0–1 | Metallurg Magnitogorsk |
| Anzhi Makhachkala | w/o | Iriston Vladikavkaz |
| Sakhalin Kholmsk | 5–2 | Okean Nakhodka |
| Zvezda Irkutsk | 2–1 (a.e.t.) | Amur Blagoveshchensk |
| Torpedo Volzhsky | 5–1 | Atommash Volgodonsk |
| Kavkazkabel Prokhladny | 5–0 | Energiya Pyatigorsk |
| Spartak Tambov | 0–3 | Saturn Ramenskoye |
| FC Gatchina | 2–2 (a.e.t.) (2–4 p) | Lokomotiv Saint Petersburg |
| Tekstilshchik Ivanovo | 1–2 (a.e.t.) | Trion-Volga Tver |
| Uralets Nizhny Tagil | 2–1 | Dynamo Perm |
| Spartak Shchyolkovo | 2–0 | Mosenergo Moscow |
| Gazovik-Gazprom Izhevsk | w/o | Druzhba Yoshkar-Ola |
| Kristall Smolensk | 0–1 (a.e.t.) | Arsenal Tula |
| Zenit Penza | 0–0 (a.e.t.) (7–6 p) | Tekstilshchik Isheyevka |
| Irtysh Omsk | w/o | Dynamo Barnaul |
| Kuban Krasnodar | 0–1 | Rostselmash Rostov-on-Don |
| Spartak Anapa | 3–1 (a.e.t.) | Druzhba Maykop |

== Fourth round ==
| Team 1 | Score | Team 2 |
|---|---|---|
26 August 1994
| Torpedo Taganrog | 0–2 | Shinnik Yaroslavl |
| Metallurg Magnitogorsk | 2–4 | Torpedo Arzamas |
| Anzhi Makhachkala | 4–0 | Uralan Elista |
| Zvezda Irkutsk | w/o | Sakhalin Kholmsk |
| Torpedo Volzhsky | 4–2 | Torpedo Vladimir |
| Kavkazkabel Prokhladny | 2–2 (a.e.t.) (4–3 p) | Chernomorets Novorossiysk |
| Lokomotiv Saint Petersburg | 0–1 | Zenit Saint Petersburg |
| Trion-Volga Tver | 2–0 | Smena-Saturn Saint Petersburg |
| Uralets Nizhny Tagil | 4–1 | Zvezda Perm |
| Gazovik-Gazprom Izhevsk | 2–1 | Neftekhimik Nizhnekamsk |
| Arsenal Tula | 1–0 | Baltika Kaliningrad |
| Zenit Penza | 0–1 | Sokol Saratov |
| Irtysh Omsk | 1–2 | Chkalovets Novosibirsk |
| Rostselmash Rostov-on-Don | 6–2 | Spartak Anapa |
27 August 1994
| Saturn Ramenskoye | 2–1 | Tekhinvest-M Moskovsky |
| Spartak Shchyolkovo | 3–1 | Asmaral Moscow |

== Round of 32 ==
Russian Premier League teams started at this stage.

| 5 October 1994 | Shinnik Yaroslavl | 0–3 | Tekstilshchik Kamyshin | Yaroslavl |
| | | | Tsygankov 53'; Natalushko 58'; Navochenko 85' | Stadium: Shinnik Stadium; Attendance: 1,500; Referee: Viktor Yapryntsev (Samara) |

| 5 October 1994 | Torpedo Arzamas | 2–0 | Lada-Tolyatti | Arzamas |
| | Kurayev 65' (pen.); Shchukin 80' | | | Stadium: Torpedo Stadium; Attendance: 5,000; Referee: Valentin Ivanov (Moscow) |

| 5 October 1994 | Anzhi Makhachkala | 1–2 | Spartak Vladikavkaz | Makhachkala |
| | Sirkhayev 18' | | Kornienko 66'; Tedeyev 89' | Stadium: Dynamo Stadium; Attendance: 12,000; Referee: Viktor Yarygin (Volgograd) |

| 5 October 1994 | Zvezda Irkutsk | 1–0 (a.e.t.) | Dynamo-Gazovik Tyumen | Irkutsk |
| | Fatin 113' | | | Stadium: Trud Stadium; Attendance: 6,700; Referee: Aleksandr Kuzmenko (Khabarovsk) |

| 5 October 1994 | Torpedo Volzhsky | 1–2 | Rotor Volgograd | Volzhsky |
| | Ilyushin 75' | | Veretennikov 71'; Tsarenko 90' | Stadium: Loginov Stadium; Attendance: 4,500; Referee: Andrei Butenko (Moscow) |

| 5 October 1994 | Kavkazkabel Prokhladny | 2–2 (3–4 p) | Dynamo Stavropol | Prokhladny |
| | Khmelevskiy 48'; R. Reshetov 76' (pen.) | | Rydny 70'; Kopylov 71' | Stadium: Central Stadium; Attendance: 3,256; Referee: Anatoli Malyarov (Moscow) |
| | Penalties |
| | Volkov (penalty missed); R. Reshetov (penalty missed); Dmitruk (penalty scored); Ivanov (penalty scored); Khmelevskiy (penalty scored); Tishchenko (penalty missed) | | (penalty scored) Rydny; (penalty missed) Sokolov; (penalty missed) Shestakov; (penalty scored) Benedsky; (penalty scored) Borzenkov; (penalty scored) Kudinov |

| 5 October 1994 | Saturn Ramenskoye | 0–1 | Torpedo Moscow | Ramenskoye |
| | | | Ulyanov 46' | Stadium: Saturn Stadium; Attendance: 8,000; Referee: Sergey Lapochkin (Saint Petersburg) |

| 5 October 1994 | Zenit Saint Petersburg | 0–2 | CSKA Moscow | Saint Petersburg |
| | | | Semak 16'; Sergeyev 83' | Stadium: Petrovsky Stadium; Attendance: 3,000; Referee: Aleksandr Lapin (Ufa) |

| 5 October 1994 | Trion-Volga Tver | 0–3 | Dynamo Moscow | Tver |
| | | | Simutenkov 7', 65' (pen.); Filippov 89' | Stadium: Khimik Stadium; Attendance: 5,000; Referee: Aleksei Markelov (Kaluga) |

| 5 October 1994 | Uralets Nizhny Tagil | 0–6 | KAMAZ Naberezhnye Chelny | Nizhny Tagil |
| | | | Durnev 11'; Tropanet 18', 34'; Zubkov 18'; Kovalyov 26'; Panchenko 49' | Stadium: Uralets Stadium; Attendance: 2,000; Referee: Vladimir Ovchinnikov (Moscow) |

| 5 October 1994 | Spartak Shchyolkovo | 1–2 | Lokomotiv Moscow | Shchyolkovo |
| | Smirnov 36' | | Katasonov 1'; Elyshev 60' | Stadium: Tekstilshchik Stadium; Attendance: 5,000; Referee: Gennadi Kulichenkov (Tula) |

| 5 October 1994 | Gazovik-Gazprom Izhevsk | 3–2 | Lokomotiv Nizhny Novgorod | Izhevsk |
| | Zavadskiy 33', 86'; Kurilov 71' | | Kalitvintsev 58', 89' | Stadium: Dynamo Stadium; Attendance: 7,000; Referee: Sergei Anokhin (Moscow) |

| 5 October 1994 | Arsenal Tula | 0–1 | Spartak Moscow | Tula |
| | | | Piatnitski 23'; Nikiforov (yellow card) 39' (red card) 82' | Stadium: Central Lenin Stadium; Attendance: 15,000; Referee: Nikolai Levnikov, Saint Petersburg |

| 5 October 1994 | Sokol Saratov | 4–0 | Krylia Sovetov Samara | Saratov |
| | Markevich 34'; Teryokhin 38', 50'; Kurakin 75' | | | Stadium: Lokomotiv Stadium; Attendance: 5,000; Referee: Yuri Chebotaryov (Krasnodar) |

| 5 October 1994 | Rostselmash Rostov-on-Don | 2–4 | Zhemchuzhina Sochi | Rostov-on-Don |
| | Yermilov 49'; Vorobyov 85' (pen.) | | Knyazhev 22'; Bozhko 55'; Filimonov 75'; Al-Khalifa 90' | Stadium: Rostselmash Stadium; Attendance: 3,500; Referee: Sergei Khusainov (Moscow) |

| 8 October 1994 | Chkalovets Novosibirsk | 0–3 | Uralmash Yekaterinburg | Novosibirsk |
| | | | Nezhelev 27'; Matveyev 70'; Perednya 88' | Stadium: Spartak Stadium; Attendance: 10,000; Referee: Igor Siner (Omsk) |

== Round of 16 ==
| 9 November 1994 | Torpedo Arzamas | 3–0 | Tekstilshchik Kamyshin | Arzamas |
| | Kanishchev 34'; Shchukin 46'; Pozhidayev 57' | | | Stadium: Torpedo Stadium; Attendance: 8,000; Referee: Andrei Butenko (Moscow) |

| 9 November 1994 | Spartak Vladikavkaz | 3–0 | Zvezda Irkutsk | Vladikavkaz |
| | Lebed 3', 84'; Markhel 35' | | | Stadium: Republican Spartak Stadium; Attendance: 5,000; Referee: Taras Bezubyak (Saint Petersburg) |

| 9 November 1994 | Rotor Volgograd | 2–1 (a.e.t.) | Dynamo Stavropol | Volgograd |
| | Nechayev 50'; Troynin 119' | | Kudinov 77' | Stadium: Central Profsoyuz Stadium; Attendance: 3,000; Referee: Sergey Lapochkin (Saint Petersburg) |

| 9 November 1994 | Torpedo Moscow | 1–1 (a.e.t.) (4–2 p) | CSKA Moscow | Moscow |
| | Grishin 14' | | Sergeyev 10' | Stadium: Torpedo Stadium; Attendance: 3,500; Referee: Andrei Budogosskiy (Moscow |
| | Penalties |
| | Afanasyev (penalty scored); Ulyanov (penalty scored); Grishin (penalty missed); Nikolayev (penalty scored); Agashkov (penalty scored) | | (penalty missed) Bystrov; (penalty missed) Bushmanov; (penalty scored) Ivanov; (penalty scored) Mamchur |

| 9 November 1994 | Dynamo Moscow | 2–1 | KAMAZ Naberezhnye Chelny | Moscow |
| | S. Nekrasov 56', 72' | | Zubkov 33' | Stadium: Dynamo Stadium; Attendance: 700; Referee: Aleksandr Lapin (Ufa) |

| 9 November 1994 | Lokomotiv Moscow | 2–1 | Gazovik-Gazprom Izhevsk | Moscow |
| | Garin 12' (pen.), 67' (pen.) | | Borovik 76' | Stadium: Lokomotiv Stadium; Attendance: 500; Referee: Aleksei Markelov (Kaluga) |

| 9 November 1994 | Spartak Moscow | 4–3 | Sokol Saratov | Moscow |
| | Mukhamadiev 22', 82'; Piatnitski 57'; Kechinov 59' | | Teryokhin 12', 39'; Monasipov 86' | Stadium: Detsky Gorodok in Luzhniki; Attendance: 1,000; Referee: Viktor Yapryntsev (Samara) |

| 9 November 1994 | Zhemchuzhina Sochi | 0–1 | Uralmash Yekaterinburg | Sochi |
| | | | Fedotov 89' | Stadium: Sochi Central Stadium; Attendance: 1,200; Referee: Valentin Ivanov (Moscow) |

== Quarter-finals ==
| 19 April 1995 | Uralmash Yekaterinburg | 0–5 | Spartak Moscow | Yekaterinburg |
| | | | Pisarev 7'; Mukhamadiev 37'; Chudin 63'; Piatnitski 73'; Nahorniak 75' | Stadium: Central Stadium; Attendance: 10,000; Referee: Igor Siner (Omsk) |

| 19 April 1995 | Lokomotiv Moscow | 2–2 (a.e.t.) (4–5 p) | Dynamo Moscow | Moscow |
| | Garin 25'; Drozdov 87' | | Kutsenko 39'; Sabitov 60' | Stadium: Lokomotiv Stadium; Attendance: 4,500; Referee: Sergei Anokhin (Moscow) |
| | Penalties |
| | Kosolapov (penalty scored); Garin (penalty scored); Chugainov (penalty scored); Kharlachyov (penalty scored); Smirnov (penalty missed) | | (penalty scored) S. Nekrasov; (penalty scored) Kovtun; (penalty scored) Kutsenko; (penalty scored) Yakhimovich; (penalty scored) Ishkinin |

| 19 April 1995 | Torpedo Arzamas | 0–3 | Spartak-Alania Vladikavkaz (Note: FC Spartak Vladikavkaz was changed their name to FC Spartak-Alania Vladikavkaz during the winter break.) | Arzamas |
| | | | Revishvili 49'; Suleymanov 64', 73' | Stadium: Torpedo Stadium; Attendance: 7,000; Referee: Viktor Filippov (Moscow) |

| 19 April 1995 | Rotor Volgograd | 0–0 (a.e.t.) (4–3 p) | Torpedo Moscow | Volgograd |
| | | | | Stadium: Central Profsoyuz Stadium; Attendance: 10,000; Referee: Yuri Chebotaryov (Krasnodar) |
| | Penalties |
| | Veretennikov (penalty scored); Bondar (penalty scored); Burlachenko (penalty scored); Kulik (penalty missed); Troynin (penalty scored) | | (penalty missed) Chumachenko; (penalty scored) Shustikov; (penalty missed) Pazemov; (penalty scored) Grishin; (penalty scored) Agashkov |

== Semi-finals ==
| 17 May 1995 | Dynamo Moscow | 1–0 | Spartak Moscow | Moscow |
| | Cheryshev 44' | | | Stadium: Dynamo Stadium; Attendance: 13,000; Referee: Vladimir Ovchinnikov (Moscow) |

| 17 May 1995 | Spartak-Alania Vladikavkaz | 2–2 (a.e.t.) (2–4 p) | Rotor Volgograd | Vladikavkaz |
| | Kavelashvili 22'; Tetradze 85' | | Berketov 63'; Yesipov 65' (red card) 87' | Stadium: Republican Spartak Stadium; Attendance: 33,000; Referee: Nikolai Levnikov, Saint Petersburg |
| | Penalties |
| | Derkach (penalty scored); Tetradze (penalty missed); Yanovskiy (penalty scored); Kavelashvili (penalty missed) | | (penalty scored) Veretennikov; (penalty scored) Bondar; (penalty scored) Burlachenko; (penalty missed) Nechay; (penalty scored) Troynin |

== Final ==
14 June 1995

| Dynamo Moscow | 0–0 (a.e.t.) | Rotor Volgograd |
Penalties
| S. Nekrasov (penalty scored); Ishkinin (penalty scored); Samatov (penalty scored); Kutsenko (penalty scored); Yakhimovich (penalty scored); Bogomolov (penalty scored); Safronov (penalty scored); Shulgin (penalty scored) | 8–7 | (penalty scored) Veretennikov; (penalty scored) Bondar; (penalty scored) Burlachenko; (penalty scored) Menshchikov; (penalty scored) Troynin; (penalty scored) Nechay; (penalty scored) Zhunenko; (penalty missed) Korniyets |

Luzhniki Stadium, Moscow
Attendance: 15,000
Referee: Igor Siner (Omsk)

Oleg Veretennikov hit the goalpost from a penalty kick in the 115th minute of the game.

| FC Dynamo Moscow | FC Rotor Volgograd |

FC Dynamo Moscow:
| GK | (Russia) Andrei Smetanin |
| DF | (Belarus) Erik Yakhimovich |
| FW | (Russia) Igor Nekrasov (substituted off) 82' |
| DF | (Russia) Aleksandr Tochilin |
| DF | (Russia) Ravil Sabitov (substituted off) 50' |
| MF | (Russia) Sergei Nekrasov |
| MF | (Russia) Oleg Samatov |
| MF | (Russia) Andrey Kobelev (substituted off) 110' |
| FW | (Russia) Vitali Safronov |
| DF | (Russia) Sergei Podpaly (captain) |
| FW | (Russia) Aleksei Kutsenko |
Substitutes:
| MF | (Russia) Ruslan Ishkinin (substituted on) 82' |
| DF | (Russia) Sergei Shulgin (substituted on) 50' |
| MF | (Russia) Sergei Bogomolov (substituted on) 110' |
Manager:
(Russia) Konstantin Beskov

FC Rotor Volgograd:
| GK | (Russia) Andrei Samorukov |
| DF | (Kazakhstan) Sergei Zhunenko |
| DF | (Russia) Valeri Burlachenko |
| MF | (Ukraine) Igor Korniyets |
| DF | (Russia) Sergei Nechay (captain) |
| MF | (Russia) Aleksandr Tsarenko |
| DF | (Russia) Aleksandr Bondar |
| FW | (Kazakhstan) Vladimir Niederhaus (substituted off) 105' |
| MF | (Russia) Oleg Veretennikov |
| DF | (Russia) Aleksandr Berketov (substituted off) 67' |
| FW | (Russia) Oleg Nechayev (substituted off) 46' |
Substitutes:
| MF | (Russia) Igor Menshchikov (substituted on) 105' |
| MF | (Russia) Aleksandr Troynin (substituted on) 67' |
| MF | (Russia) Andrei Krivov (substituted on) 46' |
Manager:
(Ukraine) Viktor Prokopenko

MATCH RULES

- 90 minutes.
- 30 minutes of extra-time if necessary.
- Penalty shootout if scores still level.
- Seven named substitutes
- Maximum of 3 substitutions.

Played in the earlier stages, but not in the final:

FC Dynamo Moscow: Valeri Kleimyonov (GK), Yuri Kovtun (DF), Sergey Timofeev (Kazakhstan) (DF), Andrei Chernyshov (DF), Aleksandr Borodkin (DF), Aleksei Filippov (DF), Vagiz Khidiyatullin (DF), Andrei Ivanov (DF), Denis Klyuyev (MF), Dmitri Cheryshev (FW), Igor Simutenkov (FW), Kirill Rybakov (FW), Yuri Tishkov (FW).

FC Rotor Volgograd: Volodymyr Gerashchenko (Ukraine) (DF), Aleksandr Yeshchenko (MF), Konstantin Kulik (Moldova) (MF), Dmitri Ivanov (MF), Valery Yesipov (MF), Yuri Aksyonov (Kazakhstan) (MF), Rustem Khuzin (FW).
