= 1993 Russian Top League =

2nd season of top-tier football league in Russia

Russian Top League
- Season: 1993

Statistics of Russian Top League in season 1993.

== Teams ==
18 teams are played in the 1993 season. After the 1992 season, Zenit St.Petersburg, Fakel Voronezh, Kuban Krasnodar, Shinnik Yaroslavl and Dinamo-Gazovik were relegated to the 1993 Russian First League. They were replaced by Zhemchuzhina-Sochi, winners of the 1992 Russian First League.

=== Venues ===
Asmaral Moscow	CSKA Moscow	Dynamo Moscow	Dynamo Stavropol
Krasnaya Presnya Stadium	Grigory Fedotov Stadium	Central Dynamo Stadium	Dynamo Stadium
Capacity:	Capacity: 10,000	Capacity: 36,540	Capacity: 15,589
KAMAZ Naberezhnye Chelny	Locations of teams in the 1993 Top League Locations of teams in the 1993 Top League Locations of the teams from Moscow in the 1993 Top League		Krylia Sovetov
KAMAZ Stadium	Locations of teams in the 1993 Top League Locations of teams in the 1993 Top League Locations of the teams from Moscow in the 1993 Top League		Metallurg Stadium
Capacity: 9,056	Locations of teams in the 1993 Top League Locations of teams in the 1993 Top League Locations of the teams from Moscow in the 1993 Top League		Capacity: 33,001
Lokomotiv Moscow	Locations of teams in the 1993 Top League Locations of teams in the 1993 Top League Locations of the teams from Moscow in the 1993 Top League		Lokomotiv Nizhny Novgorod
Lokomotiv Stadium	Locations of teams in the 1993 Top League Locations of teams in the 1993 Top League Locations of the teams from Moscow in the 1993 Top League		Lokomotiv Stadium
Capacity: 27,084	Locations of teams in the 1993 Top League Locations of teams in the 1993 Top League Locations of the teams from Moscow in the 1993 Top League		Capacity: 17,856
Luch Vladivostok	Locations of teams in the 1993 Top League Locations of teams in the 1993 Top League Locations of the teams from Moscow in the 1993 Top League		Okean Nakhodka
Dynamo Stadium	Locations of teams in the 1993 Top League Locations of teams in the 1993 Top League Locations of the teams from Moscow in the 1993 Top League		Vodnik Stadium
Capacity: 10,200	Locations of teams in the 1993 Top League Locations of teams in the 1993 Top League Locations of the teams from Moscow in the 1993 Top League		Capacity: 4,000
Rostselmash	Locations of teams in the 1993 Top League Locations of teams in the 1993 Top League Locations of the teams from Moscow in the 1993 Top League		Rotor Volgograd
Olimp-2	Locations of teams in the 1993 Top League Locations of teams in the 1993 Top League Locations of the teams from Moscow in the 1993 Top League		Central Stadium
Capacity: 15,840	Locations of teams in the 1993 Top League Locations of teams in the 1993 Top League Locations of the teams from Moscow in the 1993 Top League		Capacity: 32,120
Spartak Moscow	Locations of teams in the 1993 Top League Locations of teams in the 1993 Top League Locations of the teams from Moscow in the 1993 Top League		Spartak Vladikavkaz
Luzhniki Stadium	Locations of teams in the 1993 Top League Locations of teams in the 1993 Top League Locations of the teams from Moscow in the 1993 Top League		Republican Spartak Stadium
Capacity: 81,029	Locations of teams in the 1993 Top League Locations of teams in the 1993 Top League Locations of the teams from Moscow in the 1993 Top League		Capacity: 32,464
Tekstilshchik Kamyshin	Torpedo Moscow	Uralmash Yekaterinburg	Zhemchuzhina-Sochi
Tekstilshchik Stadium	Luzhniki Stadium	SKB-Bank Arena	Sochi Central Stadium
Capacity: 10,000	Capacity: 81,029	Capacity: 10,000	Capacity: 10,200

=== Personnel and kits ===
Team	Location	Head coach	Captain
Asmaral Moscow	Moscow	Nikolai Khudiyev	
CSKA Moscow	Moscow	Boris Kopeykin	
Dynamo Moscow	Moscow	Adamas Golodets	
Dynamo Stavropol	Stavropol	Sergei Zimenkov	
KAMAZ	Naberezhnye Chelny	Valeri Chetverik	
Krylia Sovetov	Samara	Viktor Antikhovich	
Lokomotiv Moscow	Moscow	Yuri Semin	
Lokomotiv Nizhny Novgorod	Nizhny Novgorod	Valeri Ovchinnikov	
Luch Vladivostok	Vladivostok	Aleksandr Ivchenko	
Okean Nakhodka	Nakhodka	Aleksandr Averyanov	
Rostselmash	Rostov-on-Don	Enver Yulgushov	
Rotor Volgograd	Volgograd	Vladimir Salkov	
Spartak Moscow	Moscow	Oleg Romantsev	
Spartak Vladikavkaz	Vladikavkaz	Vladimir Fedotov	
Tekstilshchik Kamyshin	Kamyshin	Sergei Pavlov	
Torpedo Moscow	Moscow	Yury Mironov	
Uralmash Yekaterinburg	Yekaterinburg	Viktor Shishkin	
Zhemchuzhina-Sochi	Sochi	Arsen Naydyonov	

=== Managerial changes ===
Team	Outgoing manager	Manner of departure	Date of vacancy	Position in table	Replaced by	Date of appointment	Position in table
CSKA Moscow	(Russia) Gennadi Kostylev		August 1993		(Russia) Boris Kopeykin	August 1993	
Dynamo Moscow	(Russia) Valery Gazzaev		September 1993		(Russia) Adamas Golodets	September 1993	
Spartak Vladikavkaz	(Russia) Aleksandr Novikov		September 1993		(Russia) Aleksandr Yanovsky	September 1993	
Spartak Vladikavkaz	(Russia) Aleksandr Yanovsky		October 1993		(Russia) Vladimir Fedotov	October 1993	

== League standings ==
Pos	Team	Pld	W	D	L	GF	GA	GD	Pts	Qualification or relegation
1	Spartak Moscow (C)	34	21	11	2	81	18	+63	53	Qualification to Champions League group stage
2	Rotor Volgograd	34	17	8	9	56	35	+21	42	Qualification to UEFA Cup first round
3	Dynamo Moscow	34	16	10	8	65	38	+27	42	Qualification to UEFA Cup first round
4	Tekstilshchik Kamyshin	34	14	11	9	45	34	+11	39	Qualification to UEFA Cup first round
5	Lokomotiv Moscow	34	14	11	9	45	29	+16	39	
6	Spartak Vladikavkaz	34	16	6	12	49	45	+4	38	
7	Torpedo Moscow	34	15	8	11	35	40	−5	38	
8	Uralmash Yekaterinburg	34	16	4	14	51	52	−1	36	
9	KAMAZ Naberezhnye Chelny	34	12	6	16	45	53	−8	30	
10	CSKA Moscow	34	12	6	16	43	45	−2	30	Qualification to Cup Winners' Cup first round
11	Lokomotiv N.N.	34	12	6	16	34	49	−15	30	
12	Dynamo Stavropol	34	11	8	15	39	49	−10	30	
13	Zhemchuzhina Sochi	34	10	10	14	52	62	−10	30	
14	Krylia Sovetov Samara	34	9	12	13	37	47	−10	30	Qualification to Promotion tournament
15	Luch Vladivostok	34	11	7	16	29	56	−27	29	Qualification to Promotion tournament
16	Okean Nakhodka	34	10	8	16	28	40	−12	28	Qualification to Promotion tournament
17	Rostselmash (R)	34	8	12	14	35	52	−17	28	Relegation to First League
18	Asmaral Moscow (R)	34	7	6	21	28	53	−25	20	Relegation to First League

Source: rsssf.com
Rules for classification: 1) points; 2) goal difference; 3) number of goals scored.
(C) Champions; (R) Relegated

== Results ==
Home \ Away	ASM	CSK	DYN	DST	KAM	KRY	LOK	LNN	LUC	OKN	ROS	ROT	SPA	SPV	TEK	TOR	URA	ZHE
Asmaral Moscow		1–2	0–1	2–1	2–1	0–0	0–0	2–0	1–0	1–1	4–0	1–0	0–3	2–3	0–1	0–1	2–1	3–5
CSKA Moscow	1–0		1–1	2–0	1–1	4–0	3–1	3–0	3–1	0–0	2–3	2–0	0–3	4–0	3–0	1–1	2–1	1–1
Dynamo Moscow	4–0	2–1		4–0	4–3	3–0	1–1	3–0	7–1	3–0	2–0	0–0	1–1	2–2	1–1	3–2	1–1	6–3
Dynamo Stavropol	3–1	1–1	0–2		2–0	3–1	0–0	2–0	3–0	0–0	1–1	1–0	0–2	2–0	1–1	3–0	1–2	2–1
KAMAZ Naberezhnye Chelny	3–0	1–0	0–2	3–0		1–1	1–0	2–1	2–1	1–0	1–1	0–0	0–1	5–2	3–1	4–1	3–1	1–0
Krylia Sovetov Samara	1–0	2–0	1–0	3–1	4–0		1–1	1–0	2–2	3–0	1–1	1–1	1–3	1–1	2–1	1–2	0–0	3–0
Lokomotiv Moscow	2–0	2–0	3–0	1–1	1–1	1–0		4–1	5–0	0–0	5–2	2–1	0–0	0–2	1–2	0–1	3–0	1–0
Lokomotiv N.N.	1–0	1–4	1–1	4–1	1–0	1–1	2–0		2–1	2–0	1–0	3–2	0–0	1–0	1–2	0–1	1–2	2–1
Luch Vladivostok	3–2	2–1	0–1	0–0	1–0	1–0	1–1	1–0		1–0	2–1	0–0	0–3	3–1	0–0	1–0	2–1	2–2
Okean Nakhodka	1–0	1–0	1–0	1–0	2–1	2–0	0–1	2–0	0–1		2–0	3–1	1–1	3–0	0–0	0–1	0–1	0–2
Rostselmash	1–0	1–0	1–1	2–0	0–0	3–3	1–3	1–1	2–1	1–1		0–2	2–0	3–3	0–2	0–1	2–1	3–0
Rotor Volgograd	2–0	3–0	3–2	2–1	4–1	2–0	1–0	4–0	2–0	5–1	2–1		1–0	1–0	1–1	2–2	3–2	3–1
Spartak Moscow	5–1	6–0	3–0	3–1	6–1	3–0	3–0	2–0	4–0	1–1	3–0	1–1		5–1	2–0	0–0	2–0	3–0
Spartak Vladikavkaz	2–0	2–0	2–1	1–1	2–0	2–0	1–0	1–2	2–0	2–0	3–0	2–0	1–1		3–1	1–0	1–0	4–0
Tekstilshchik Kamyshin	1–1	3–0	1–1	2–3	1–0	0–0	0–0	1–3	4–0	2–1	2–0	3–1	0–0	1–0		0–0	5–1	3–1
Torpedo Moscow	1–1	2–1	0–4	0–1	1–0	2–2	2–3	2–0	1–0	3–1	0–0	2–1	1–1	2–0	0–2		1–0	2–1
Uralmash Yekaterinburg	2–1	1–0	1–0	3–1	4–1	3–0	1–3	1–1	3–1	3–1	1–1	0–3	2–8	2–0	1–0	5–0		3–2
Zhemchuzhina Sochi	0–0	1–0	4–1	4–2	5–4	3–1	0–0	1–1	0–0	3–2	1–1	2–2	2–2	2–2	3–1	1–0	0–1	

Legend: Blue = home team win; Yellow = draw; Red = away team win.

== Promotion tournament ==
FC Rostselmash and FC Asmaral were relegated. FC Krylia Sovetov, FC Luch and FC Okean played in a promotion tournament against the winners of the three zones of the 1993 Russian First League, in which three spots in 1994 Russian Top League were contested. FC Krylia Sovetov kept their spot and FC Luch and FC Okean were relegated.

Pos	Team	Pld	W	D	L	GF	GA	GD	Pts	Promotion or relegation
1	Krylia Sovetov Samara	5	3	1	1	10	8	+2	7	Promotion to Top League
2	Lada-Togliatti (P)	5	2	3	0	8	3	+5	7	Promotion to Top League
3	Dynamo-Gazovik Tyumen (P)	5	3	0	2	8	5	+3	6	Promotion to Top League
4	Luch Vladivostok (R)	5	2	2	1	11	9	+2	6	Relegation to First League
5	Chernomorets Novorossiysk	5	1	1	3	7	10	−3	3	Relegation to First League
6	Okean Nakhodka (R)	5	0	1	4	5	14	−9	1	Relegation to First League

Source: RSSSF
(P) Promoted; (R) Relegated

== Season statistics ==
=== Top goalscorers ===
As of matches played on 10 November 1993.

Rank	Player	Club	Goals
1	(Russia) Victor Panchenko	KAMAZ	21
2	(Russia) Oleg Veretennikov	Rotor	19
3	(Russia) Vladimir Beschastnykh	Spartak Moscow	18
4	(Russia) Igor Simutenkov	Dynamo Moscow	16
5	(Belarus) Mikhail Markhel	Spartak Vladikavkaz	14
5	(Russia) Nikolai Pisarev	Spartak Moscow	14
5	(Azerbaijan) Nazim Suleymanov	Spartak Vladikavkaz	14
8	(Georgia (country)) Gocha Gogrichiani	Zhemchuzhina	13
8	(Russia) Valeri Karpin	Spartak Moscow	13
8	(Kazakhstan) (Russia) Vladimir Niederhaus	Rotor	13

== Medal squads ==
(league appearances and goals listed in brackets)

1. FC Spartak Moscow

Goalkeepers: Gintaras Staučė (Lithuania) (13), Stanislav Cherchesov (13), Oleksandr Pomazun (Ukraine) (8).
Defenders: Viktor Onopko (30 / 9), Ramiz Mamedov (30), Andrei Ivanov (29), Yuriy Nikiforov (23), Dmitri Khlestov (19 / 1), Dmitri Popov (13 / 1), Dmitri Ananko (11), Andrei Chernyshov (4), Aleksandr Bondar (2), Sergei Chudin (2), Dmitri Gradilenko (1).
Midfielders: Valery Karpin (30 / 13), Igor Lediakhov (29 / 6), Andrei Piatnitski (29 / 6), Ilya Tsymbalar (26 / 3), Andrei Gashkin (11), Serhiy Pohodin (Ukraine) (2), Valery Kechinov (1).
Forwards: Nikolai Pisarev (33 / 14), Fyodor Cherenkov (32 / 6), Vladimir Beschastnykh (29 / 18), Dmitri Radchenko (14 / 2), Sergey Rodionov (8), Andrey Tikhonov (7 / 2), Andrei Konovalov (1).

Manager: Oleg Romantsev.

Transferred out during the season: Dmitri Radchenko, Dmitri Popov (both to (Spain) Racing de Santander), Stanislav Cherchesov (to (Germany) Dynamo Dresden), Andrei Chernyshov (to FC Dynamo Moscow), Aleksandr Bondar (to FC Terek Grozny), Dmitri Gradilenko (to FC Interros Moskovsky).

2. FC Rotor Volgograd

Goalkeepers: Andrei Manannikov (Tajikistan) (34), Sergei Gritsenko (1).
Defenders: Sergei Nechay (33 / 2), Volodymyr Gerashchenko (Ukraine) (32 / 2), Aleksandr Shmarko (31 / 1), Valeri Burlachenko (29 / 1), Aleksandr Yeshchenko (5), Sergey Kuznetsov (4).
Midfielders: Oleg Veretennikov (33 / 19), Igor Menshchikov (31), Aleksandr Tsarenko (29 / 5), Andrei Kovalenko (Belarus) (29 / 3), Aleksandr Zhidkov (29 / 2), Oleg Stogov (21), Aleksei Gerasimenko (14), Andrei Miroshnichenko (Kazakhstan) (2).
Forwards: Valery Yesipov (31 / 8), Vladimir Niederhaus (Kazakhstan) (30 / 13), Oleg Nechayev (13), Aleksandr Nikitin (11), Yevgeni Shkilov (8), Yuri Konovalov (3).

Manager: Vladimir Salkov.

Transferred out during the season: Yevgeni Shkilov (to (Israel) Hapoel Haifa F.C.), Andrei Miroshnichenko (Kazakhstan) (to (Kazakhstan) FC Aktyubinets Aktyubinsk).

3. FC Dynamo Moscow

Goalkeepers: Valeri Kleymyonov (29), Andrei Smetanin (8), Dmitriy Kramarenko (Azerbaijan) (1).
Defenders: Yuri Kovtun (27 / 1), Sergey Timofeev (Kazakhstan) (21 / 2), Vyacheslav Tsaryov (19), Aleksei Selezov (18), Andrei Chernyshov (14 / 1), Igor Varlamov (8), Sargis Hovhannisyan (Armenia) (8), Igor Sklyarov (7 / 1), Maksim Layushkin (1).
Midfielders: Omari Tetradze (32 / 4), Bakhva Tedeyev (30 / 8), Yuriy Kalitvintsev (26 / 3), Yevgeni Smertin (23 / 1), Sergei Krutov (22 / 3), Igor Dobrovolski (18 / 6), Sergei Derkach (12 / 1), Aleksei Savchenko (11), Sergei Nekrasov (10), Aleksei Filippov (6), Igor Gavrilin (2 / 1), Vladimir Kostyuk (Turkmenistan) (2).
Forwards: Igor Simutenkov (33 / 16), Dmitri Cheryshev (22 / 7), Kirill Rybakov (19 / 5), Yuri Tishkov (16 / 4), Yuriy Hudymenko (Ukraine) (9 / 1), Nikolai Kovardayev (1).

Manager: Valery Gazzaev (until September), Adamas Golodets (caretaker, from September).

Transferred out during the season: Sergei Derkach (to (Switzerland) FC Basel), Nikolai Kovardayev (to FC Interros Moskovsky).

== Attendances ==
#	Club	Average Attendance	Change
1	Rotor	19,706	83,0%
2	Alania	17,059	-13,7%
3	KAMAZ	11,706	103,7%
4	Luch	8,794	135,1%
5	Tekstilshchik	8,544	15,4%
6	Okean	8,471	27,1%
7	Spartak Moscow	8,059	-24,6%
8	Uralmash	7,853	38,2%
9	Krylia Sovetov	7,576	-3,1%
10	Dinamo Stavropol	6,441	-10,9%
11	Nizhny Novgorod	6,029	-23,1%
12	Zhemchuzhina	5,676	113,9%
13	Rostselmash	4,618	6,5%
14	Dynamo Moscow	4,465	3,3%
15	PFC CSKA	3,676	-19,9%
16	Torpedo	3,271	39,6%
17	Lokomotiv Moscow	1,588	-36,9%
18	Asmaral	1,079	-67,3%
