= Valeri Zverkov =

Russian footballer

Personal information
- Full name: Valeri Akimovich Zverkov
- Date of birth: 15 February 1970 (age 56)
- Height: 1.81 m (5 ft 11 1/2 in)
- Positions: Forward; midfielder

Senior career*
Years	Team	Apps	(Gls)
1986	FC Torpedo Volzhsky	1	(0)
1987	FC Svetotekhnika Saransk	13	(0)
1987–1988	FC Tekstilshchik Kamyshin	15	(0)
1989	FC Svetotekhnika Saransk	11	(0)
1989	FC Burevestnik Saransk (amateur)		
1990	FC SKA Rostov-on-Don	5	(0)
1991	FC Lokomotiv Bataysk		
1992	FC Dynamo Stavropol	0	(0)
1992	FC Tekstilshchik Kamyshin	3	(0)
1992	→ FC Tekstilshchik-d Kamyshin (loan)	1	(0)
1993–1994	FC Torpedo Arzamas	33	(4)
1995	FC Trion-Volga Tver	3	(0)
1998	FC Torpedo Arzamas	6	(0)
2000	FC Pochtovik Saransk		
2007	FC MUVD na VVT Moscow (amateur)		
2008	FC MVD Rossii-M Moscow		
- * Club domestic league appearances and goals

Valeri Akimovich Zverkov (Russian: Валерий Акимович Зверков; born 15 February 1970) is a former Russian football player.
