= Kudinov =

Kudinov (Russian: Куди́нов) is a surname that may refer to:

- Dimitri Kudinov (born 1963), Georgian football player
- Dmitri Kudinov (footballer, born 1971), Russian football player
- Dmitri Kudinov (footballer, born 1985), Russian football player
- Vasily Kudinov (born 1969), Russian handball player
- Yuri Kudinov (born 1979), Russian swimmer
