= Aleksandr Bondar =

Aleksandr Bondar may refer to:

- Aleksandr Bondar (footballer) (born 1967), Russian footballer
- Aleksandr Bondar (diver) (born 1993), Russian diver
