= Igor Nekrasov =

Russian footballer (1975–?)

Personal information
- Full name: Igor Vladimirovich Nekrasov
- Date of birth: 10 April 1975
- Place of birth: Moscow, Russian SFSR
- Date of death: Unknown
- Height: 1.88 m (6 ft 2 in)
- Positions: Defender; midfielder; striker

Youth career
- Dynamo Moscow

Senior career*
Years	Team	Apps	(Gls)
1992–1993	Dynamo-2 Moscow	48	(22)
1994–1995	Dynamo Moscow	2	(0)
1994–1995	→ Dynamo-d Moscow	56	(12)
1996	FC Spartak Serpukhov		
1996	FC Klin		
1997–1999	Khimki	94	(10)
2000	FC Dynamo-MGO Moscow		
2001	Khimki	21	(0)
2002	Zvezda Irkutsk	30	(3)
2003	FC Almaz Moscow		
2004–2005	FC Zorky Krasnogorsk (amateur)		

International career
1994	Russia U21	2	(0)
- * Club domestic league appearances and goals

Igor Vladimirovich Nekrasov (Russian: Игорь Владимирович Некрасов; born 10 April 1975; died on unknown date) was a Russian professional footballer.

== Club career ==
Nekrasov made his professional debut in the Russian Second Division in 1992 for Dynamo-2 Moscow.

== Personal life ==
He was the younger brother of Sergei Nekrasov (1973–2026).

In 2025, Dynamo Moscow published an article celebrating the 30th anniversary of the 1994–95 Russian Cup victory, where he was mentioned as deceased, without details about the exact date or circumstances of his death.

== Honours ==
- Russian Premier League runner-up: 1994
- Russian Cup: 1995
