= Andrei Yarygin =

Russian footballer

Personal information
- Full name: Andrei Vasilyevich Yarygin
- Date of birth: 7 April 1975 (age 51)
- Place of birth: Takhta, Russian SFSR
- Height: 1.73 m (5 ft 8 in)
- Position: Midfielder

Youth career
- SUOR Stavropol

Senior career*
Years	Team	Apps	(Gls)
1991	FC Signal Izobilny	4	(0)
1992	FC Dynamo Stavropol	6	(0)
1992	FC Dynamo-APK Izobilny	33	(4)
1993	FC Dynamo Stavropol	9	(0)
1993	FC Druzhba Budyonnovsk	9	(0)
1994–1995	FC Venets Gulkevichi	75	(4)
1996	FC Signal Izobilny (amateur)		
1996–1997	FC Feniks Gulkevichi		
1997	FC Torpedo Armavir	0	(0)
1998	FC Torpedo Georgiyevsk	2	(0)
1999	FC Signal Izobilny (amateur)		
2000–2003	FC Spartak-Kavkaztransgaz Izobilny	107	(5)
2004	FC Feniks Gulkevichi		
2004–2005	FC Kolos Pavlovskaya		
2006	FC Dynamo Gulkevichi		
2007–2008	FC Aroma Gulkevichi		
- * Club domestic league appearances and goals

Andrei Vasilyevich Yarygin (Russian: Андрей Васильевич Ярыгин; born 7 April 1975) is a former Russian football player.
