= Yuriy Konovalov =

Yuriy Konovalov may refer to:

- Yuriy Konovalov (athlete) (1929–2008), Soviet Olympic athlete in running
- Yuriy Konovalov (footballer) (born 1970), Russian football player
- Yury Konovalov (sailor) (born 1961), Russian Olympic sailor
