= Kostyantyn Kulyk =

Ukrainian footballer

Personal information
- Full name: Kostyantyn Anatoliyovych Kulyk
- Date of birth: 14 June 1970 (age 56)
- Place of birth: Odesa, Ukrainian SSR
- Height: 1.75 m (5 ft 9 in)
- Positions: Midfielder; striker

Youth career
- 1979–1988: FC Chornomorets Odesa

Senior career*
Years	Team	Apps	(Gls)
1989	FC Tighina Bender	6	(1)
1990	FC Nistru Chişinău	16	(0)
1990	FC Kapaz Gandja	16	(2)
1991	SKA Odesa	12	(0)
1991	Neftchi Baku PFC	15	(1)
1992–1994	FC Chornomorets Odesa	56	(10)
1995	FC Rotor Volgograd	10	(0)
1996	FC Dynamo Stavropol	21	(6)
1997	FC Metallurg Lipetsk	25	(3)
1998–2001	FC Zimbru Chişinău	94	(22)
2002–2003	FC Chornomorets Odesa	27	(3)
2003	→ FC Chornomorets-2 Odesa	9	(0)
2003–2005	FC Dniester Ovidiopol	52	(13)

Managerial career
- 2008–2011: FC Dniester Ovidiopol (administrator)
- 2011–2013: FC Odesa (administrator)
- 2017–2018: FC Zhemchuzhyna Odesa (administrator)
- * Club domestic league appearances and goals

Kostyantyn Anatoliyovych Kulyk (Ukrainian: Костянтин Анатолійович Кулик; born 14 June 1970) is a former Ukrainian professional footballer.

== Club career ==
He made his professional debut in the Soviet Second League in 1989 for FC Tighina Bender. He played one game in the UEFA Champions League 2000–01 qualification for FC Zimbru Chişinău.

== Honours ==
- Ukrainian Premier League runner-up: 1995.
- Ukrainian Premier League bronze: 1992, 1993, 1994.
- Moldovan National Division champion: 1994, 1998, 1999.
- Russian Cup finalist: 1995.
