= Kirill Rybakov =

Russian footballer

Personal information
- Full name: Kirill Nikolayevich Rybakov
- Date of birth: 11 May 1969 (age 57)
- Place of birth: Moscow, Soviet Union
- Height: 1.82 m (5 ft 11 1/2 in)
- Position: Forward

Youth career
- 1985–1989: Dynamo Moscow

Senior career*
Years	Team	Apps	(Gls)
1986–1989	Dynamo Moscow	0	(0)
1989–1991	Lokomotiv Moscow	44	(6)
1991–1992	Asmaral Moscow	38	(21)
1993–1995	Dynamo Moscow	21	(5)
1995–1997	Stomil Olsztyn	12	(1)
1997	MEPhI Moscow	12	(3)
1998–1999	Zimbru Chișinău	7	(2)
2000	Khimki	0	(0)
2001	Slavia Mozyr	1	(0)
- * Club domestic league appearances and goals

Kirill Nikolayevich Rybakov (Russian: Кирилл Николаевич Рыбаков; born 11 May 1969) is a Russian former professional footballer who played as a forward.

== Club career ==
He made his professional debut in the Soviet Top League in 1989 for Lokomotiv Moscow. He played 1 game in the 1993–94 UEFA Cup for Dynamo Moscow.

== Honours ==
Dynamo Moscow

- Russian Cup: 1994–95

Zimbru Chișinău

- Moldovan National Division: 1998–99
