= Sergei Bogomolov =

Russian footballer

Personal information
- Full name: Sergei Anatolyevich Bogomolov
- Date of birth: 17 August 1971 (age 55)
- Place of birth: Moscow, Russia
- Height: 1.77 m (5 ft 10 in)
- Positions: Midfielder; forward

Senior career*
Years	Team	Apps	(Gls)
1992	FC Interros Moskovsky	26	(8)
1994	FC Rossiya Moscow	38	(7)
1995	FC Dynamo Moscow (reserves)	34	(3)
1997	FC Torpedo-ZIL Moscow	31	(3)
1998	FC Monolit Moscow	28	(1)
1999	FC Khimki	10	(0)
- * Club domestic league appearances and goals

Sergei Anatolyevich Bogomolov (Russian: Серге́й Анатольевич Богомолов; born 17 August 1971) is a Russian former professional footballer.

== Club career ==
During his time with FC Dynamo Moscow he only played in a single game for the main team, but it was a very memorable one. On 14 June 1995, Dynamo was playing FC Rotor Volgograd in the final game of the 1994–95 Russian Cup. Dynamo was hurt by injuries to some first team regulars and several reserve players, including Bogomolov, were called up for the game. With the score of 0:0 and 10 minutes to go in extra time, Bogomolov substituted Andrei Kobelev. With 5 minutes to go Rotor's Oleg Veretennikov hit the goalpost with his penalty kick, and the game ended scoreless. In the following penalty shootout Bogomolov scored his penalty kick to make the score 6:6, and Dynamo went on to win the shootout 8:7. Bogomolov never played on a level higher than the third-tier Russian Second Division again in his career. As of 2019, that cup win remains the only trophy Dynamo has won in 35 years.
