= Oleg Rydny =

Russian footballer and coach (1967–2024)

Personal information
- Full name: Oleg Anatolyevich Rydny
- Date of birth: 7 April 1967
- Date of death: 26 August 2024 (aged 57)
- Height: 1.78 m (5 ft 10 in)
- Position: Forward

Senior career*
| Years | Team | Apps | (Gls) |
| 1985–1989 | FC Shakhtar Donetsk | 2 | (0) |
| 1989 | FC Mashuk Pyatigorsk | 42 | (19) |
| 1990 | FC Dynamo Stavropol | 37 | (4) |
| 1991 | FC Asmaral Kislovodsk | 18 | (5) |
| 1991–1992 | Kiskőrösi Petőfi Spartacus | | |
| 1993–1994 | FC Lokomotiv Nizhny Novgorod | 36 | (2) |
| 1994–1996 | FC Dynamo Stavropol | 67 | (22) |
| 1996 | FC Torpedo Arzamas | 16 | (4) |
| 1997 | FC Dynamo Stavropol | 33 | (11) |
| 1998–1999 | FK Daugava Rīga | 43 | (23) |
| 2000 | FC Lokomotiv-Taim Mineralnye Vody | 26 | (19) |
| 2001 | FC Spartak-Orekhovo Orekhovo-Zuyevo | 33 | (10) |
| 2004 | FC Mashuk-KMV Pyatigorsk | 3 | (0) |

Managerial career
- 2003: FC Mashuk-KMV Pyatigorsk (assistant)
- 2006: FC Mashuk-KMV Pyatigorsk (assistant)
- 2007: FC Lokomotiv-KMV Mineralnye Vody
- 2008: FC Mashuk-KMV Pyatigorsk (video operator)
- 2010: FC Mashuk-KMV Pyatigorsk (assistant)
- * Club domestic league appearances and goals

Oleg Anatolyevich Rydny (Russian: Олег Анатольевич Рыдный; 7 April 1967 – 26 August 2024) was a Russian professional football coach and player. He died on 26 August 2024, at the age of 57.

== Club career ==
Rydny made his professional debut in the Soviet Top League in 1988 for FC Shakhtar Donetsk.
