= 2018 Russian Cup final =

Russian football tournament

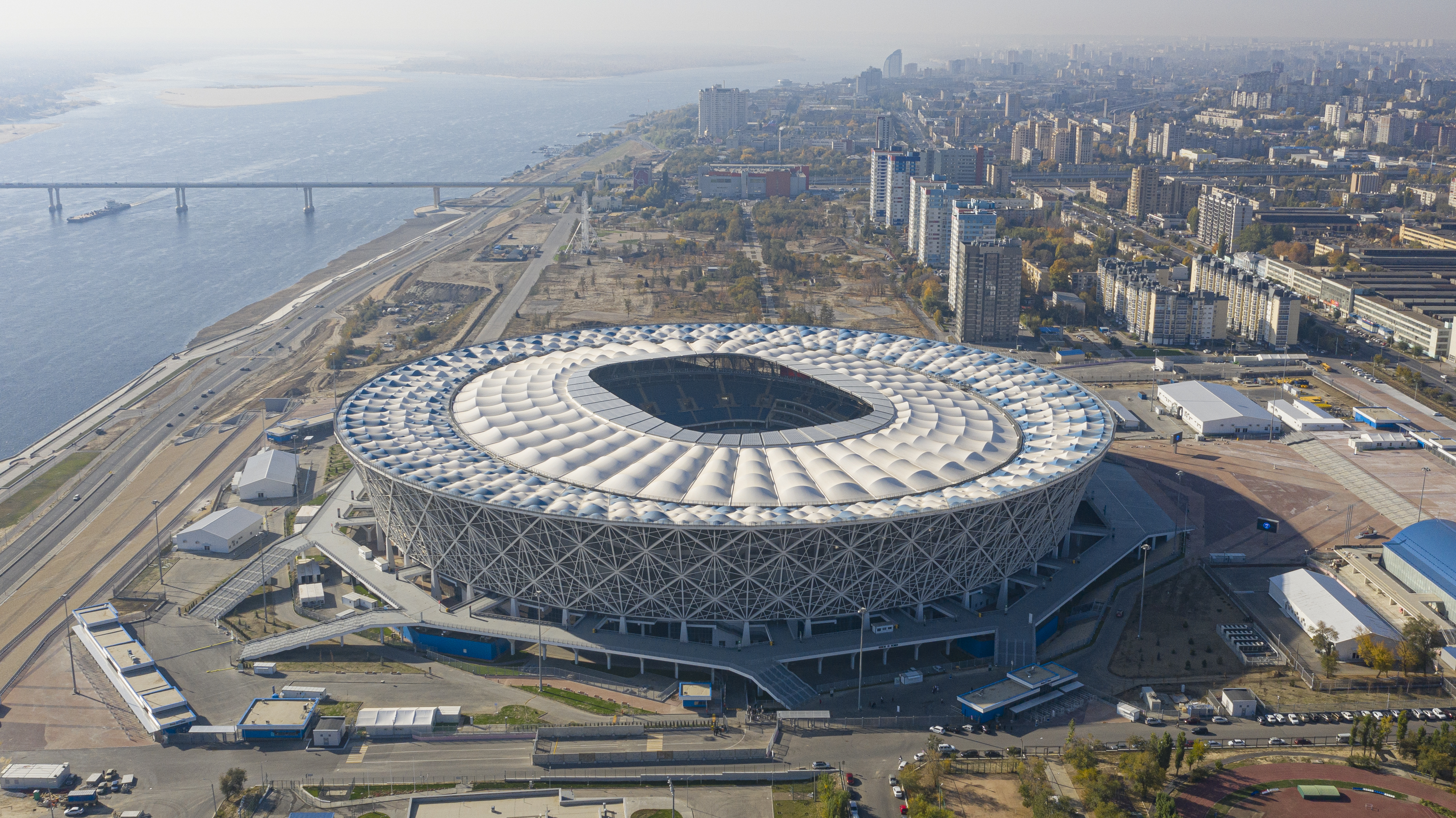
- Event: 2017–18 Russian Cup
Tosno	Avangard
2	1
- Date: 9 May 2018
- Venue: Volgograd Arena, Volgograd
- Referee: Sergei Karasev
- Attendance: 40,373

The 2018 Russian Cup final decided the winner of the 2017–18 Russian Cup, the 26th season of Russia's main football cup. It was played on 9 May 2018 at the Volgograd Arena, between Tosno and Avangard Kursk. Tosno won the game courtesy of goals from Aleksei Skvortsov and Reziuan Mirzov, with Igor Kireyev scoring a consolation goal for the second division side.

As winners, Tosno qualified for the group stage of the UEFA Europa League and were also set to face the champions of the Russian Premier League, Lokomotiv Moscow in the 2018 Russian Super Cup held on 27 July. However, on 9 June 2018, it was announced that FC Tosno was dissolved because of financial problems and CSKA Moscow replaced them as participants in the Super Cup.

== Background ==
This was the first Russian Cup final appearance for either side.

With Tosno having only been formed in 2013, they came into the game, in their first season in the Russian Premier League, in the relegation zone.

Avangard Kursk, midtable in the second division, would also have claimed their first-ever piece of silverware and have never before played in the Russian top flight.

== Match details ==
The final match was played on 9 May 2018.

9 May 2018
19:00 (UTC+2)

Tosno (1)	2–1	Avangard Kursk (2)
Skvortsov 10'; Mirzov 80'	Report	Kireyev 16'

Volgograd Arena, Volgograd
Attendance: 40,373
Referee: Sergei Karasev
