= Sergei Bozhko =

Russian footballer

Personal information
- Full name: Sergei Yuryevich Bozhko
- Date of birth: 3 March 1973 (age 53)
- Place of birth: Krasnyi Lyman, Ukrainian SSR
- Height: 1.70 m (5 ft 7 in)
- Positions: Midfielder; forward

Youth career
- LVUFK Luhansk

Senior career*
Years	Team	Apps	(Gls)
1991–1992	FC Zorya Luhansk	12	(1)
1991–1992	→ FC Vahonobudivnyk Stakhanov (loans)	21	(14)
1992–1994	FC Zhemchuzhina-Sochi	49	(10)
1992–1993	→ FC Torpedo Adler	11	(2)
1994	FC Ilves	5	(1)
1995–1996	FC Lokomotiv Nizhny Novgorod	25	(1)
1997–1998	FC Torpedo Arzamas	42	(12)
1999–2002	FC Stal Alchevsk	78	(18)
2000–2002	→ FC Stal-2 Alchevsk	2	(2)
2002	FC Terek Grozny	1	(0)
2003–2006	FC Naftovyk-Ukrnafta Okhtyrka	77	(3)
- * Club domestic league appearances and goals

Sergei Yuryevich Bozhko (Russian: Серге́й Юрьевич Божко; Ukrainian: Сергій Юрійович Божко – Serhiy Yuriyovych Bozhko; born 3 March 1973) is a former Russian professional footballer. He also holds Ukrainian citizenship.

== Club career ==
He made his professional debut in the Soviet Second League in 1991 for FC Zorya Luhansk.
