= Erik Yakhimovich =

Belarusian footballer (born 1968)

Personal information
- Full name: Erik Nikolayevich Yakhimovich
- Date of birth: 6 September 1968 (age 58)
- Place of birth: Minsk, Byelorussian SSR, Soviet Union
- Height: 1.84 m (6 ft 0 in)
- Position: Defender

Team information
- Current team: Dynamo Moscow (scout)

Youth career
- 1986–1988: Dinamo Minsk

Senior career*
Years	Team	Apps	(Gls)
1989–1994	Dinamo Minsk	92	(6)
1994–2000	Dynamo Moscow	127	(2)
1997–1998	→ Vanspor (loan)	19	(1)
2000–2001	Gaziantepspor	25	(0)
2002	Shandong Luneng	14	(1)

International career
1993–2001	Belarus	34	(0)

Managerial career
- 2008–: Dynamo Moscow (scout)
- * Club domestic league appearances and goals

Erik Yakhimovich (Belarusian: Эрык Мікалаевіч Яхімовіч; born 6 September 1968) is a Belarusian former professional footballer who works for Dynamo Moscow as a scout. A defender, he retired from professional football in 2003, after a brief stint in China. Yakhimovich made 34 appearances for the Belarus national team.

== Career statistics ==
Appearances and goals by club, season and competition
Club	Season	League		
Club	Season	Division	Apps	Goals
Dinamo Minsk	1989	Soviet Top League	5	0
Dinamo Minsk	1990	Soviet Top League	18	0
Dinamo Minsk	1991	Soviet Top League	29	2
Dinamo Minsk	1992	Belarusian Premier League	19	3
Dinamo Minsk	1993	Belarusian Premier League	21	1
Dinamo Minsk	Total		92	6
Dynamo Moscow	1994	Russian Premier League	15	0
Dynamo Moscow	1995	Russian Premier League	28	0
Dynamo Moscow	1996	Russian Premier League	33	1
Dynamo Moscow	1997	Russian Premier League	21	0
Dynamo Moscow	1998	Russian Premier League	20	0
Dynamo Moscow	1999	Russian Premier League	26	1
Dynamo Moscow	2000	Russian Premier League	15	0
Dynamo Moscow	Total		148	2
Vanspor (loan)	1998–99	Süper Lig	19	1
Gaziantepspor	2001–02	Süper Lig	6	0
Gaziantepspor	2000–01	Süper Lig	19	0
Gaziantepspor	Total		25	0
Shandong Luneng	2002	Chinese Jia-A League	14	1
Career total			298	10

== Honours ==
Dinamo Minsk

- Belarusian Premier League: 1992, 1992–93, 1993–94
- Belarusian Cup: 1992, 1993–94

Dynamo Moscow

- Russian Cup: 1994–95
