= Aleksandr Shchukin =

Russian footballer

Personal information
- Full name: Aleksandr Yuryevich Shchukin
- Date of birth: 5 January 1969
- Place of birth: Gorky, Russian SFSR, Soviet Union
- Date of death: 18 March 2000 (aged 31)
- Place of death: near Arzamas, Russia
- Height: 1.75 m (5 ft 9 in)
- Position: Midfielder

Youth career
- DYuSSh-8 Gorky

Senior career*
Years	Team	Apps	(Gls)
1987–1993	FC Lokomotiv Nizhny Novgorod	138	(9)
1994–1997	FC Torpedo Arzamas	119	(16)
1998	FC Kuban Krasnodar	15	(0)
1998	FC Torpedo Arzamas	14	(0)
1999	FC Neftekhimik Nizhnekamsk	27	(2)
2000	FC Svetotekhnika Saransk	5	(0)
- * Club domestic league appearances and goals

Aleksandr Yuryevich Shchukin (Russian: Александр Юрьевич Щукин; 5 January 1969 – 18 March 2000) was a Russian professional footballer.

== Club career ==
He made his professional debut in the Soviet Second League in 1987 for FC Lokomotiv Gorky.

== Death ==
He was killed in 2000 in a car crash near Arzamas.
