= Vitali Safronov =

Russian footballer

Personal information
- Full name: Vitali Anatolyevich Safronov
- Date of birth: 6 June 1973 (age 53)
- Place of birth: Kaluga, Russian SFSR
- Height: 1.70 m (5 ft 7 in)
- Positions: Midfielder; striker

Senior career*
Years	Team	Apps	(Gls)
1990–1991	FC Zarya Kaluga	38	(6)
1992	FC Presnya Moscow	33	(3)
1992–1993	FC Asmaral Moscow	29	(7)
1994	FC Krylia Sovetov Samara	23	(7)
1995–1996	FC Dynamo Moscow	32	(4)
1996–1999	FC Krylia Sovetov Samara	93	(18)
1999	FC Baltika Kaliningrad	19	(3)
2000–2001	FC Fakel Voronezh	53	(18)
2002	FC Volgar-Gazprom Astrakhan	29	(10)
2003	FC Salyut-Energiya Belgorod	34	(9)
2004	FC Fakel Voronezh	27	(8)
2005	FC Salyut-Energiya Belgorod	33	(6)
2006	FC SKA Rostov-on-Don	23	(6)
2007	FC Nika Krasny Sulin		

Managerial career
- 2012–2015: FC Kaluga (director)
- 2013: FC Kaluga (caretaker)
- 2015–2017: FC Kaluga
- * Club domestic league appearances and goals

Vitali Anatolyevich Safronov (Russian: Виталий Анатольевич Сафронов; born 6 June 1973) is a Russian professional football coach and a former player.

== Playing career ==
He made his professional debut in the Soviet Second League in 1990 for FC Zarya Kaluga. He played 6 games and scored 1 goal in the UEFA Cup Winners' Cup 1995–96 for FC Dynamo Moscow.

Education Graduated Malahovskiy State Institute of Physical Culture and Sports. First coach – Alexander Pavlov and Yury Ignatov.

Adult career began in Kaluga Dawn. In the 90 years playing in Russian Football Championships for Moscow Asmaral and Dynamo (FC Moscow), Soviet Wings (football club, Samara), as well as farm clubs Asmaral and Dynamo in the lower leagues. As part of the Moscow Dynamo won the 1994–95 Russian Cup, had 6 games and scored 1 goal in the 1995–96 UEFA Cup Winners' Cup.

In the summer of 1999 and moved from the Wings to the club First Division Baltika Kaliningrad, where he was offered a lucrative contract. But three months later, when the Baltika virtually collapsed, as most of the team left the club, do not even get all the money owed.

Signed a contract with the Voronezh Fakel, which played two seasons in the Premier League. After leaving the Fakel was playing in the first division for the club Volgar-Gazprom, in the Second Division for the clubs Salyut-Energia, Fakel, SKA from Rostov-on-Don. Two-time winner of the area the Center of the second division (2004 in the Fakel and 2005 in the Salyut-Energia ). In 2007, as part of Nika from Krasny Sulin won zone South LFL.

Was the head coach of FC Lokomotiv Kaluga. Now – Head of team in second league Kaluga .

== Honours ==
- Russian Cup winner: 1995.
