= Aleksandr Tsarenko =

Russian footballer

Personal information
- Full name: Aleksandr Anatolyevich Tsarenko
- Date of birth: 21 November 1967 (age 58)
- Place of birth: Volgograd, Russian SFSR
- Height: 1.75 m (5 ft 9 in)
- Position: Midfielder

Senior career*
Years	Team	Apps	(Gls)
1988	FC Gorizont Volgograd		
1989	FC Zvezda Gorodishche	41	(13)
1990–1991	Sogdiana Jizak	54	(10)
1991–1996	FC Rotor Volgograd	130	(15)
1996–1997	FC Energiya Kamyshin	36	(11)
1997–1998	FC Tyumen	18	(2)
1998	FC Lokomotiv Nizhny Novgorod	5	(0)
1999	FC Zheleznodorozhnik Volgograd		
1999	FC Vodnik Kalach-na-Donu		
2000–2002	FC Energetik Uren	73	(37)
2003	FC Olimpia Volgograd	35	(7)
2004	FC Sodovik Sterlitamak	21	(1)
2005	FC Olimpia Volgograd	0	(0)
2006	FC Tekstilshchik Kamyshin	27	(1)

Managerial career
- 2009: FC Volgograd (administrator)
- 2012–2014: FC Zvezda Gorodishche
- 2015: FC Alfa Volgograd
- 2016: FC Urozhay Yelan
- * Club domestic league appearances and goals

Aleksandr Anatolyevich Tsarenko (Russian: Александр Анатольевич Царенко; born 21 November 1967) is a Russian professional football manager and a former player.

== Club career ==
He made his professional debut in the Soviet Second League in 1989 for FC Zvezda Gorodishche.

== Personal life ==
His son Aleksandr Aleksandrovich Tsarenko also played football professionally.

== Honours ==
- Russian Premier League runner-up: 1993.
- Russian Premier League bronze: 1996.
- Russian Cup finalist: 1995.

== European club competitions ==
With FC Rotor Volgograd.

- UEFA Cup 1994–95: 2 games.
- UEFA Cup 1995–96: 1 game.
