= Ruslan Ishkinin =

Russian footballer

Personal information
- Full name: Ruslan Kamilyevich Ishkinin
- Date of birth: 14 June 1974 (age 52)
- Place of birth: Moscow, Russian SFSR
- Height: 1.74 m (5 ft 8 1/2 in)
- Positions: Midfielder; forward

Senior career*
Years	Team	Apps	(Gls)
1992	FC Dynamo-2 Moscow	37	(5)
1993–1994	FC Orekhovo Orekhovo-Zuyevo	55	(7)
1995	FC Dynamo Moscow	1	(0)
1996	FC Saturn Ramenskoye	13	(0)
1997	FC Gigant Voskresensk		
1998–2002	FC Kolomna	154	(27)
- * Club domestic league appearances and goals

Ruslan Kamilyevich Ishkinin (Russian: Руслан Камильевич Ишкинин; born 14 June 1974) is a former Russian professional footballer.

== Club career ==
He made his professional debut in the Russian Second Division in 1992 for FC Dynamo-2 Moscow.

The most memorable match of his career was played on 14 June 1995. His team FC Dynamo Moscow was playing FC Rotor Volgograd in the final game of the Russian Cup. Dynamo was decimated by injuries and several reserve players, including Ishkinin, were called up for the game. With 5 minutes to go in regulation and the score of 0–0, Ishkinin came on as a substitute. The score remained 0–0, in the shootout Ishkinin scored to make the score 2–2. Dynamo went on to win the shootout 8–7 and that Cup victory remains the only trophy Dynamo has won in the last 35 years (as of 2019). Ishkinin only played 2 more games for the main squad of Dynamo.
