= Aleksei Filippov (footballer, born 1973) =

Russian footballer

Personal information
- Full name: Aleksei Aleksandrovich Filippov
- Date of birth: 10 June 1973 (age 53)
- Place of birth: Ivanovo, Russian SFSR
- Height: 1.82 m (6 ft 0 in)
- Positions: Midfielder; defender

Youth career
- FC Tekstilshchik Ivanovo

Senior career*
Years	Team	Apps	(Gls)
1990–1992	FC Tekstilshchik Ivanovo	82	(14)
1993–1995	FC Dynamo Moscow	9	(0)
1995	FC Chernomorets Novorossiysk	18	(0)
1996	FC Metallurg Lipetsk	31	(0)
1997	FC Energiya Kamyshin	18	(0)
1997	FC Shinnik Yaroslavl	0	(0)
1998–2000	FC Rubin Kazan	74	(4)
2001–2002	FC Amkar Perm	53	(10)
2003	FC Luch-Energiya Vladivostok	22	(3)
2004	FC Spartak Kostroma	12	(0)
2005	FC Lokomotiv-NN Nizhny Novgorod	19	(6)
2006	FC Sheksna Cherepovets	10	(0)
2006	FC Zvezda Serpukhov	7	(0)
2007	FC Kooperator Vichuga		
- * Club domestic league appearances and goals

Aleksei Aleksandrovich Filippov (Russian: Алексей Александрович Филиппов; born 10 June 1973) is a former Russian professional footballer.

== Club career ==
He made his professional debut in the Soviet Second League in 1990 for FC Tekstilshchik Ivanovo. He played 1 game in the UEFA Cup 1994–95 for FC Dynamo Moscow.

He played for FC Shinnik Yaroslavl in the Russian Cup.

== Honours ==
- Russian Premier League runner-up: 1994.
- Russian Premier League bronze: 1993.
- Russian Cup winner: 1995.
