= Igor Fatin =

Russian footballer

Personal information
- Full name: Igor Viktorovich Fatin
- Date of birth: 24 November 1962 (age 63)
- Height: 1.78 m (5 ft 10 in)
- Positions: Midfielder; forward

Senior career*
Years	Team	Apps	(Gls)
1979–1989	FC Zvezda Irkutsk	210	(45)
1990–1993	FC Okean Nakhodka	129	(15)
1994–1996	FC Zvezda Irkutsk	106	(13)
1998–1999	FC Selenga Ulan-Ude	23	(1)

Managerial career
- 2000–2001: FC Zvezda Irkutsk (assistant)
- * Club domestic league appearances and goals

Igor Viktorovich Fatin (Russian: Игорь Викторович Фатин; born 24 November 1962) is a former Russian professional footballer.

== Club career ==
He made his professional debut in the Soviet Second League in 1979 for FC Zvezda Irkutsk.
