= Aleksandr Troynin =

Russian footballer

Personal information
- Full name: Aleksandr Viktorovich Troynin
- Date of birth: 16 March 1972 (age 54)
- Place of birth: Volgograd, Russian SFSR
- Height: 1.86 m (6 ft 1 in)
- Positions: Midfielder; defender

Youth career
- UOR Volgograd

Senior career*
Years	Team	Apps	(Gls)
1989–1993	FC Rotor Volgograd	49	(3)
1993	FC Torpedo Volzhsky	13	(2)
1994–1995	FC Rotor Volgograd	13	(1)
1995	FC KAMAZ-Chally Naberezhnye Chelny	0	(0)
1996	FC Lokomotiv Nizhny Novgorod	4	(0)
1996–1998	FC Metallurg Lipetsk	83	(7)
1999	FC Kristall Smolensk	15	(0)
2000–2002	FC Tyumen	82	(9)
2003	FC Olimpia Volgograd	2	(0)
2003	FC Tekstilshchik Kamyshin	5	(0)

Managerial career
- 2004: FC Tekstilshchik Kamyshin
- * Club domestic league appearances and goals

Aleksandr Viktorovich Troynin (Russian: Александр Викторович Тройнин; born 16 March 1972) is a former Russian professional footballer.

== Club career ==
He made his professional debut in the Soviet Top League in 1990 for FC Rotor Volgograd. He played 1 game in the UEFA Cup 1994–95 for FC Rotor Volgograd.

== Honours ==
- Russian Cup finalist: 1995.
