= Igor Kurakin =

Russian footballer (1963–2000)

Personal information
- Full name: Igor Anatolyevich Kurakin
- Date of birth: 9 April 1963
- Place of birth: Moscow, Russian SFSR
- Date of death: 8 August 2000 (aged 37)
- Place of death: Yoshkar-Ola, Russia
- Height: 1.78 m (5 ft 10 in)
- Position: Midfielder

Youth career
- FC Dynamo Moscow

Senior career*
Years	Team	Apps	(Gls)
1980–1984	PFC CSKA Moscow	33	(3)
1986	FC Torpedo Moscow	6	(0)
1986–1992	FC Sokol Saratov	197	(33)
1992–1993	KajHa Kajaani	22	(4)
1993–1997	FC Sokol Saratov	134	(16)
1998–1999	FC Salyut Saratov	23	(0)
1999	FC Balakovo	9	(0)
2000	FC Iskra Engels	17	(1)
- * Club domestic league appearances and goals

Igor Anatolyevich Kurakin (Russian: Игорь Анатольевич Куракин; 9 April 1963 – 8 August 2000 in a road accident) was a Russian professional footballer.

== Club career ==
He played 4 seasons in the Soviet Top League for PFC CSKA Moscow and FC Torpedo Moscow.
