= Andrei Kopylov (footballer) =

Russian footballer

Personal information
- Full name: Andrei Nikolayevich Kopylov
- Date of birth: 9 December 1972 (age 53)
- Place of birth: Krasnodar Krai, Russian SFSR
- Height: 1.74 m (5 ft 9 in)
- Positions: Midfielder; defender

Senior career*
| Years | Team | Apps | (Gls) |
| 1990 | FC Signal Izobilny | 25 | (1) |
| 1991–1998 | FC Dynamo Stavropol | 241 | (28) |
| 1999 | FC Arsenal Tula | 28 | (5) |
| 2000 | FC Shinnik Yaroslavl | 13 | (2) |
| 2000 | FC Sokol Saratov | 13 | (0) |
| 2001 | FC Dynamo Stavropol | 27 | (3) |
| 2002 | FC Zhemchuzhina Budyonnovsk | 38 | (5) |
| 2003–2004 | FC Neftekhimik Nizhnekamsk | 69 | (5) |
| 2007 | FC Biolog Novokubansk | | |
- * Club domestic league appearances and goals

Andrei Nikolayevich Kopylov (Russian: Андрей Николаевич Копылов; born 9 December 1972) is a former Russian professional footballer.

== Club career ==
He made his professional debut in the Soviet Second League B in 1990 for FC Signal Izobilny.
