= Valeri Burlachenko =

Russian footballer

Personal information
- Full name: Valeri Ivanovich Burlachenko
- Date of birth: 5 July 1970 (age 56)
- Place of birth: Volgograd, Russian SFSR
- Height: 1.83 m (6 ft 0 in)
- Positions: Midfielder; defender

Team information
- Current team: Rotor-2 Volgograd (manager)

Youth career
- ShISP Volgograd

Senior career*
Years	Team	Apps	(Gls)
1988	Tekstilshchik Kamyshin	22	(0)
1989	Zvezda Gorodishche	20	(0)
1989–1998	Rotor Volgograd	217	(6)
1998	Rubin Kazan	20	(3)
1999	Sokol Saratov	27	(0)
2000	Rotor Volgograd	14	(0)
2000–2001	Metallurg Lipetsk	56	(1)
2002–2003	Lisma-Mordovia Saransk	66	(9)
2004	Tekstilshchik Kamyshin	2	(0)

Managerial career
- 2004: Rotor Volgograd (reserves assistant)
- 2005: Rotor Volgograd (assistant)
- 2006: Rotor Volgograd
- 2008–2009: SKA-Energiya Khabarovsk (assistant)
- 2009: Volgograd
- 2010: Rotor Volgograd (assistant)
- 2011–2013: Rotor Volgograd
- 2014–2015: Gazovik Orenburg (assistant)
- 2015–2016: Sokol Saratov
- 2017: Chayka Peschanokopskoye
- 2018: Rotor Volgograd (assistant)
- 2019: Rotor-2 Volgograd (assistant)
- 2019–2021: Nizhny Novgorod (assistant)
- 2021–2023: Pari Nizhny Novgorod (U-19)
- 2024: Pari NN-2
- 2025: Serikspor (assistant)
- 2025: Rotor-2 Volgograd
- 2025: Rotor Volgograd (caretaker)
- 2025–: Rotor-2 Volgograd
- * Club domestic league appearances and goals

Valeri Ivanovich Burlachenko (Russian: Валерий Иванович Бурлаченко; born 5 July 1970) is a Russian professional football coach and a former player who is the manager of Rotor-2 Volgograd.

== Club career ==
He made his professional debut in the Soviet Second League in 1988 for Tekstilshchik Kamyshin.

== Honours ==
- Russian Premier League runner-up: 1993, 1997.
- Russian Premier League bronze: 1996.
- Russian Cup finalist: 1995.

== European club competitions ==
With Rotor Volgograd.

- UEFA Cup 1994–95: 2 games.
- UEFA Cup 1995–96: 3 games.
- UEFA Intertoto Cup 1996: 5 games.
- UEFA Cup 1997–98: 5 games.
