= Aleksei Kutsenko =

Russian footballer

Personal information
- Full name: Aleksei Aleksandrovich Kutsenko
- Date of birth: 26 December 1972 (age 53)
- Place of birth: Moscow, Russian SFSR
- Height: 1.78 m (5 ft 10 in)
- Position: Forward

Youth career
- FC Lokomotiv Moscow

Senior career*
Years	Team	Apps	(Gls)
1991–1993	FC Dynamo-2 Moscow	96	(30)
1994–1997	FC Dynamo Moscow	43	(5)
1998–1999	FC Sokol Saratov	42	(12)
1999	FC Chernomorets Novorossiysk	12	(3)
2000	FC Arsenal Tula	31	(8)
2001	FC Saturn Ramenskoye	0	(0)
- * Club domestic league appearances and goals

Aleksei Aleksandrovich Kutsenko (Russian: Алексей Александрович Куценко; born 26 December 1972) is a former Russian professional footballer.

== Club career ==
He made his professional debut in the Soviet Second League in 1991 for FC Dynamo-2 Moscow.

== Honours ==
- Russian Premier League runner-up: 1994.
- Russian Premier League bronze: 1997.
- Russian Cup winner: 1995.
- Russian Cup finalist: 1997.
- Russian Third League Zone 3 top scorer: 1995 (35 goals).

== European club competitions ==
With FC Dynamo Moscow.

- UEFA Cup 1994–95: 1 game.
- UEFA Cup Winners' Cup 1995–96: 2 games.
- UEFA Cup 1996–97: 1 game.
- UEFA Intertoto Cup 1997: 6 games, 1 goal.
