= Oleg Samatov =

Russian footballer

Personal information
- Full name: Oleg Anatolyevich Samatov
- Date of birth: 20 June 1965 (age 61)
- Place of birth: Kaliningrad, now Korolyov, Russian SFSR
- Height: 1.74 m (5 ft 8 1/2 in)
- Position: Midfielder

Team information
- Current team: SKA-Khabarovsk (fitness coach)

Youth career
- DYuSSh Metallist Kaliningrad

Senior career*
Years	Team	Apps	(Gls)
1983–1986	Vympel Kaliningrad		
1988–1989	Uralets Uralsk	2	(0)
1989–1993	Lokomotiv Moscow	100	(9)
1994–1996	Dynamo Moscow	61	(6)
1996	Dynamo Stavropol	16	(5)
1997–1998	Saturn Ramenskoye	48	(8)
1999–2001	Slavia Mozyr	46	(5)
2002	Sportakademklub Moscow	23	(7)
2004	Lokomotiv-M Serpukhov		
2008	Nosta-2 Novotroitsk		

Managerial career
- 2003: Sportakademklub Moscow
- 2005–2009: Nosta Novotroitsk (assistant)
- 2009: Nosta Novotroitsk (caretaker)
- 2014–2015: Arsenal Tula (conditioning)
- 2015–2016: Spartak Moscow (assistant)
- 2017: Krylia Sovetov Samara (conditioning)
- 2017–2019: Yenisey Krasnoyarsk (conditioning)
- 2020–2021: Spartak-2 Moscow (conditioning)
- 2022–2023: SKA-Khabarovsk (conditioning)
- 2024: Shinnik Yaroslavl (conditioning)
- 2025–: SKA-Khabarovsk (fitness)
- * Club domestic league appearances and goals

Oleg Anatolyevich Samatov (Russian: Олег Анатольевич Саматов; born 20 June 1965) is a Russian professional football coach and a former player. He is a fitness coach at SKA-Khabarovsk.

== Club career ==
He made his professional debut in the Soviet Second League in 1989 for FC Uralets Uralsk.

== Honours ==
- Russian Premier League runner-up: 1994.
- Belarusian Premier League runner-up: 1999.
- Russian Cup winner: 1995.
- Soviet Cup finalist: 1990.

== European club competitions ==
- UEFA Cup 1993–94 with FC Lokomotiv Moscow: 2 games.
- UEFA Cup 1994–95 with FC Dynamo Moscow: 4 games.
- UEFA Cup Winners' Cup 1995–96 with FC Dynamo Moscow: 6 games.
