= Yevgeni Knyazhev =

Russian footballer and coach

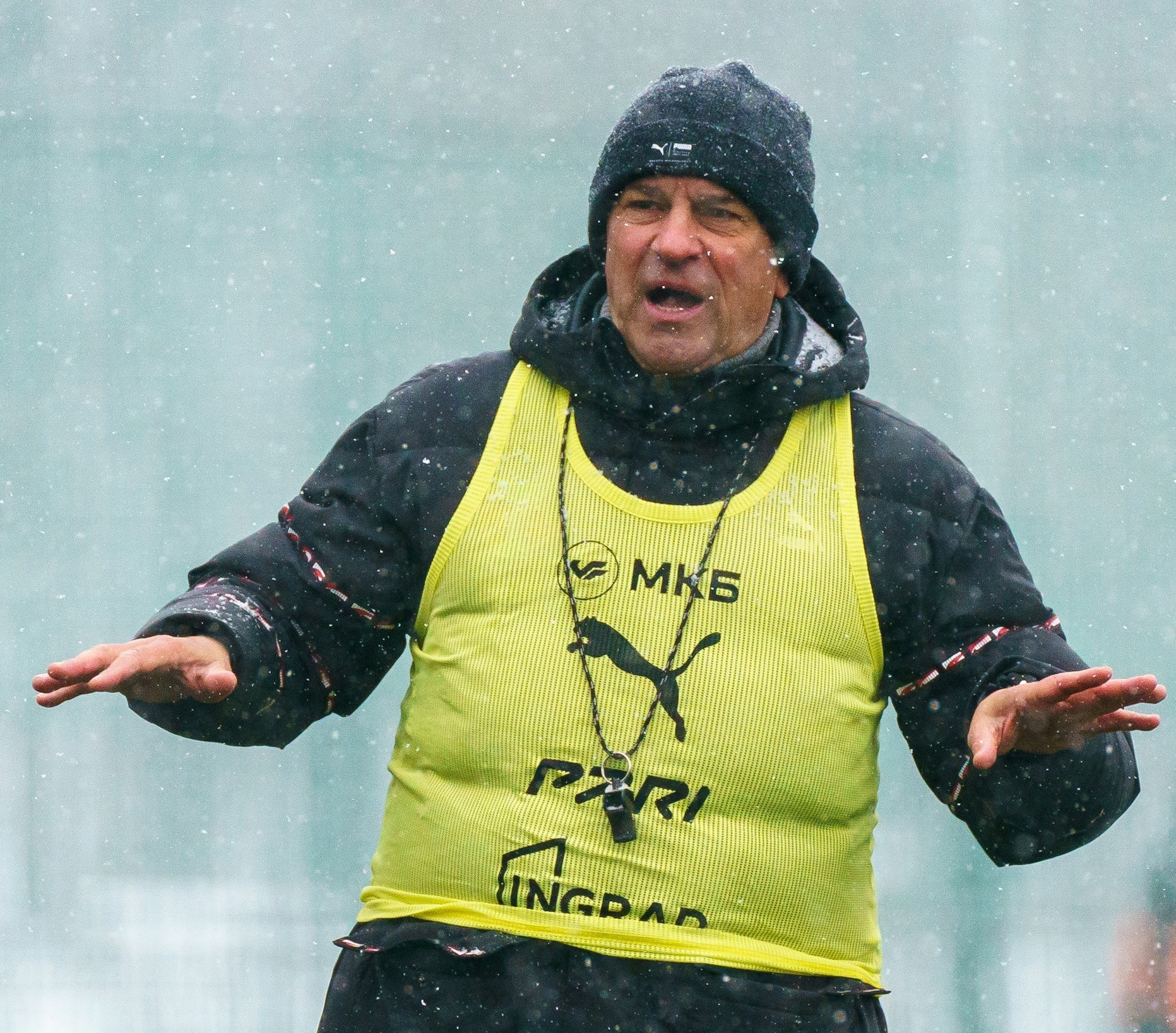
- Knyazhev with Torpedo Moscow in 2023

Personal information
- Full name: Yevgeni Vladimirovich Knyazhev
- Date of birth: 21 January 1968 (age 58)
- Place of birth: Novorossiysk, Russian SFSR
- Height: 1.72 m (5 ft 7 1/2 in)
- Position: Midfielder

Youth career
- FC Tsement Novorossiysk

Senior career*
Years	Team	Apps	(Gls)
1984–1985	FC Tsement Novorossiysk	13	(1)
1986	FC Kuban Krasnodar	30	(1)
1987–1988	FC SKA Rostov-on-Don	50	(4)
1989	PFC CSKA Moscow	0	(0)
1989–1990	FC Torpedo Moscow	0	(0)
1990–1993	FC Gekris Novorossiysk	123	(22)
1994–1995	FC Zhemchuzhina Sochi	34	(5)
1995–1996	FC Dynamo-Gazovik Tyumen	34	(4)
1996	→ FC Dynamo-Gazovik-d Tyumen	1	(0)
1997	FC Alyans Anapa		
2000	FC Spartak Anapa		

Managerial career
- 2004: FC Chernomorets Novorossiysk (assistant)
- 2020–2022: FC Akhmat Grozny (assistant)
- 2022–2023: FC Torpedo Moscow (assistant)
- 2023: FC Khimki (assistant)
- * Club domestic league appearances and goals

Yevgeni Vladimirovich Knyazhev (Russian: Евгений Владимирович Княжев; born 21 January 1968) is a Russian football coach and a former player.

== Club career ==
He played one game for the main squad of FC Torpedo Moscow in the USSR Federation Cup.
