= 2017 Russian Cup final =

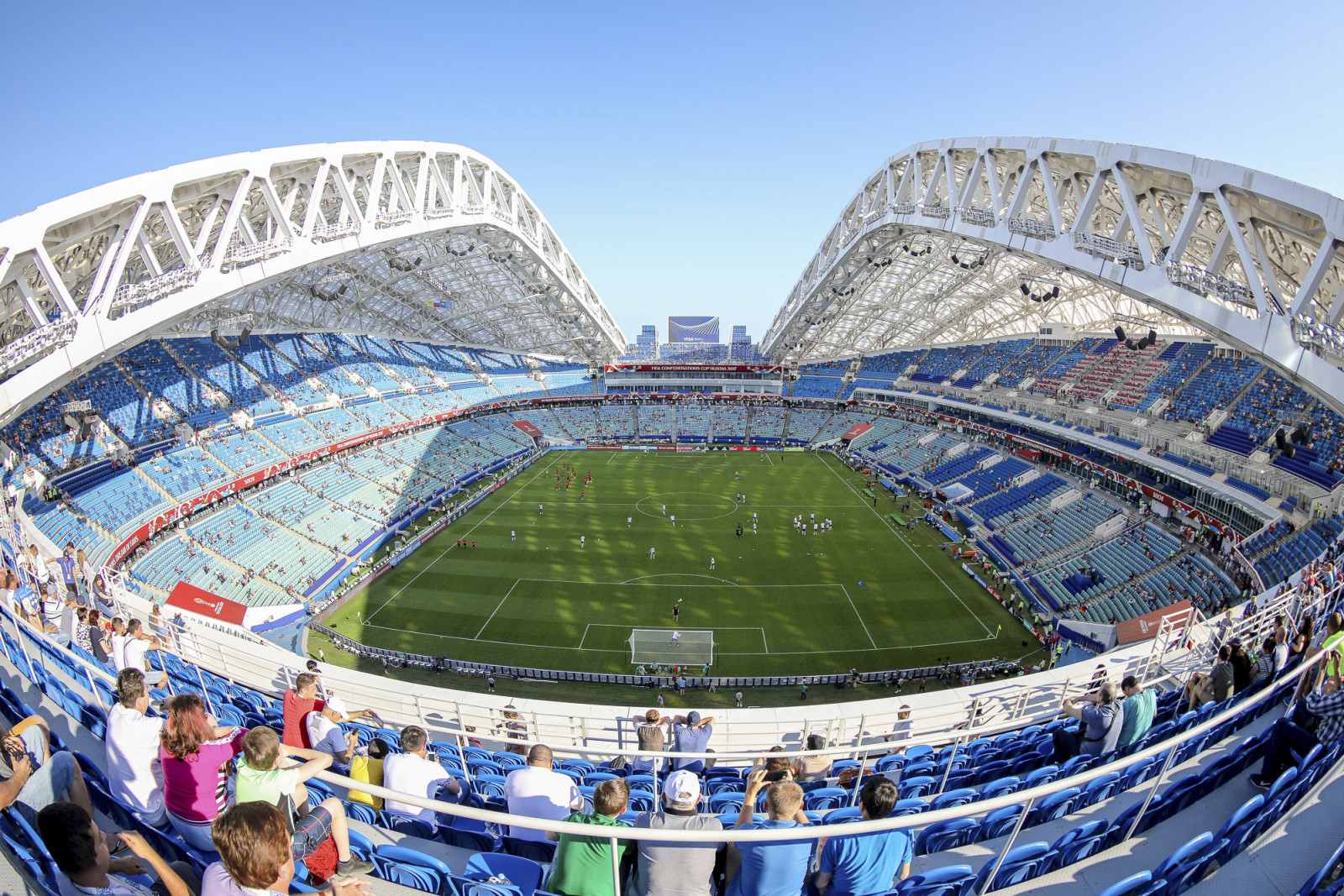
- The Fisht Olympic Stadium hosted the final
- Event: 2016–17 Russian Cup
Ural Yekaterinburg	Lokomotiv Moscow
0	2
- Date: 2 May 2017
- Venue: Fisht Olympic Stadium, Sochi
- Referee: Aleksei Nikolaev (referee)
- Attendance: 24,500

The 2017 Russian Cup final decided the winner of the 2016–17 Russian Cup, the 25th season of Russia's main football cup. It was played on 2 May 2017 at the Fisht Olympic Stadium in Sochi, between Ural Yekaterinburg and Lokomotiv Moscow. Lokomotiv won the game courtesy of goals from Igor Denisov and Aleksei Miranchuk.

The winner qualified for the group stage of the UEFA Europa League and also faced the champions of the 2016–17 Russian Premier League, Spartak Moscow in the 2017 Russian Super Cup.

== Venue ==
The Russian Cup final was held for Fisht Olympic Stadium in Sochi. The stadium, which holds 40,000 people, was constructed for the 2014 Winter Olympics and Paralympics, where it served as the venue for their opening and closing ceremonies. Following the events, the stadium was remodeled into an open-air football stadium and hosted matches as part of the 2017 FIFA Confederations Cup and 2018 FIFA World Cup.

== Background ==
Lokomotiv played their 8th Russian Cup final, second only to CSKA's 11. Prior to the 2017 final, they have won six, against the seven won by their cross town rivals. Their most recent appearance at the final was in 2015, wherein Lokomotiv ran 3-1 winners against Kuban Krasnodar.

As for Ural, it was their first ever appearance at the Russian Cup final. Indeed, their performance in the Russian Cup has been moderate at best, as their best outing so far has been a Round of 16 appearance in the 2009–10 Russian Cup and 2015–16 Russian Cup.

It was also the first time that the two clubs met in the Russian Cup final.

== Road to the final ==
Ural		Round	Lokomotiv
Opponent	Result	2016–17 Russian Cup	Opponent	Result
Chelyabinsk	3–0	Round of 32	Khimki	2–1
Amkar Perm	1–1 (4–2 pen)	Round of 16	Krylia Sovetov Samara	3–1
Krasnodar	3–3 (4–3 pen)	Quarter-finals	Tosno	1-0
Rubin Kazan	2-1	Semi-finals	Ufa	1–0

== Match ==
=== Details ===
2 May 2017
18:45 MSK (UTC+3)

Ural Yekaterinburg	0–2	Lokomotiv Moscow
	Summary	Denisov 76'; Al. Miranchuk 90'

Fisht Olympic Stadium, Sochi
Attendance: 24,500
Referee: Aleksei Nikolaev

Ural Yekaterinburg	Lokomotiv Moscow

GK	28	(Russia) Nikolai Zabolotny
DF	7	(Russia) Aleksandr Dantsev (c)
DF	4	(Slovenia) Gregor Balažic
DF	3	(Georgia (country)) Jemal Tabidze
MF	17	(Bulgaria) Nikolay Dimitrov		(substituted off) 88'
MF	12	(Russia) Aleksandr Novikov
MF	92	(Russia) Roman Yemelyanov		(substituted off) 79'
MF	18	(Russia) Vladimir Ilyin	(yellow card) 69'
MF	6	(Romania) Eric Bicfalvi
FW	9	(Russia) Roman Pavlyuchenko		(substituted off) 46'
FW	10	(Zambia) Chisamba Lungu	(yellow card) 49'
Substitutes:
MF	57	(Russia) Artyom Fidler	(red card) 90+'	(substituted on) 46'
MF	99	(Armenia) Edgar Manucharyan	(red card) 90+'	(substituted on) 79'
FW	32	(Russia) Nikita Glushkov		(substituted on) 88'
Manager:
(Russia) Aleksandr Tarkhanov

GK	1	(Brazil) Guilherme (c)
DF	5	(Serbia) Nemanja Pejčinović	(yellow card) 45'
DF	14	(Croatia) Vedran Ćorluka	(yellow card) 90'
DF	15	(Russia) Arseny Logashov
DF	29	(Uzbekistan) Vitaliy Denisov
MF	3	(Russia) Alan Kasaev		(substituted off) 108'
MF	4	(Portugal) Manuel Fernandes		(substituted off) 71'
MF	11	(Morocco) Mbark Boussoufa	(yellow card) 87'
MF	19	(Russia) Aleksandr Samedov	(yellow card) 82'
MF	49	(Russia) Roman Shishkin
FW	9	(Brazil) Ari		(substituted off) 64'
Substitutes:
GK	41	(Russia) Miroslav Lobantsev
DF	17	(Ukraine) Taras Mykhalyk
DF	55	(Russia) Renat Yanbayev
MF	7	(Brazil) Maicon		(substituted on) 108'
MF	59	(Russia) Aleksei Miranchuk		(substituted on) 71'
FW	21	(Senegal) Baye Oumar Niasse		(substituted on) 64'
FW	25	(Serbia) Petar Škuletić
Manager:
(Tajikistan) Igor Cherevchenko
