= Sergei Shulgin (footballer) =

Russian footballer

Personal information
- Full name: Sergei Aleksandrovich Shulgin
- Date of birth: 22 February 1963 (age 63)
- Place of birth: Moscow, Russian SFSR
- Height: 1.79 m (5 ft 10 1/2 in)
- Positions: Defender; midfielder

Youth career
- FC Spartak Moscow

Senior career*
Years	Team	Apps	(Gls)
1982–1985	FC Spartak Moscow	4	(0)
1985	FC Krasnaya Presnya Moscow		
1986–1987	PFC CSKA-2 Moscow		
1987	PFC CSKA Moscow	5	(0)
1988	FC Lokomotiv Moscow (reserves)		(1)
1989–1991	FC Geolog Tyumen	86	(3)
1992–1993	FC Asmaral Moscow	49	(1)
1994–1996	FC Dynamo Moscow	36	(0)

Managerial career
- 2006: FC Nosta Novotroitsk (director)
- 2009: FC Saturn-2 Moscow Oblast (general director)
- * Club domestic league appearances and goals

Sergei Aleksandrovich Shulgin (Russian: Серге́й Александрович Шульгин; born 22 February 1963) is a former Russian professional footballer.

== Club career ==
He made his professional debut in the Soviet Top League in 1983 for FC Spartak Moscow. He played 1 game for FC Lokomotiv Moscow main squad in the Soviet Cup.

== Honours ==
- Soviet Top League runner-up: 1983, 1984.
- Russian Premier League runner-up: 1994.
- Russian Cup winner: 1995 (scored the winning penalty kick in the shootout in the final game).

== European club competitions ==
With FC Dynamo Moscow.

- UEFA Cup 1994–95: 2 games.
- UEFA Cup Winners' Cup 1995–96: 5 games.
