= Viktor Panchenko =

Russian footballer

Personal information
- Full name: Viktor Vyacheslavovich Panchenko
- Date of birth: 28 May 1963 (age 63)
- Place of birth: Georgiyevsk, Stavropol Krai, Russian SFSR
- Height: 1.80 m (5 ft 11 in)
- Position: Forward

Team information
- Current team: SKA Rostov-on-Don (sporting director)

Youth career
- DYuSSh Georgiyevsk
- Mashuk Pyatigorsk

Senior career*
Years	Team	Apps	(Gls)
1980	Mashuk Pyatigorsk	0	(0)
1980–1981	Dynamo Stavropol	0	(0)
1981	Turbina Naberezhnye Chelny	4	(0)
1982	Trud-PRZ Brezhnev		
1983	Dinamo Tallinn		
1983–1984	Geolog Tyumen	0	(0)
1984	Dinamo Tallinn		
1985–1986	Sport Tallinn	51	(9)
1987–1988	Metallurg Lipetsk	71	(51)
1988–1989	Lokomotiv Moscow	11	(1)
1989	Tsement Novorossiysk	18	(15)
1990–1991	Metallurg Lipetsk	48	(13)
1991–1997	KAMAZ-Chally	97	(58)
1994–1997	KAMAZ-Chally-d	15	(3)
1997	Torpedo Georgiyevsk	12	(2)
Total		327	(142)

Managerial career
- 1998: Torpedo Georgiyevsk (general director)
- 1999: Torpedo Georgiyevsk
- 2008–2010: CSKA Moscow (head scout)
- 2010–2012: Dynamo Moscow (head scout)
- 2013–2015: Khimki (sporting director)
- 2016–2017: Lokomotiv Moscow (head scout)
- 2019–2021: SKA Rostov-on-Don (sporting director)
- 2022: Novosibirsk (sporting director)
- 2023–: SKA Rostov-on-Don (sporting director)
- * Club domestic league appearances and goals

Viktor Vyacheslavovich Panchenko (Russian: Ви́ктор Вячесла́вович Па́нченко) is a Russian football official and a former player who was the top scorer of the Russian Top Division in 1993. He scored 21 goals for KAMAZ Naberezhnye Chelny. He is the sporting director for SKA Rostov-on-Don.

Viktor Panchenko shares the record for most goals in a match of Russian Premier League, having scored five against Spartak Vladikavkaz on 26 March 1994. The only other players to achieve this are Oleg Veretennikov and Mateo Cassierra. Panchenko is the third best all-time goalscorer for KAMAZ (57 goals).

After finishing his player career Panchenko became a FIFA agent. On 6 December 2010 he was appointed the head scout of Dynamo Moscow.

His son Kirill Panchenko is a professional footballer.
