= Vadim Sokolov =

Russian footballer and manager

Personal information
- Full name: Vadim Vadimovich Sokolov
- Date of birth: 9 December 1971 (age 54)
- Place of birth: Stavropol Krai, Russian SFSR
- Height: 1.76 m (5 ft 9 1/2 in)
- Positions: Midfielder; forward

Senior career*
Years	Team	Apps	(Gls)
1991	FC Signal Izobilny	31	(4)
1992	FC Dynamo Stavropol	27	(3)
1992	FC Dynamo Izobilny	4	(0)
1993–1997	FC Dynamo Stavropol	158	(14)
1997–1999	FC Zhemchuzhina Sochi	67	(2)
2000	FC Sokol Saratov	23	(1)
2001	FC Rubin Kazan	31	(2)
2002–2003	FC Baltika Kaliningrad	78	(10)
2004	FC Luch-Energiya Vladivostok	40	(11)
2005	FC Nosta Novotroitsk	26	(2)
2006–2008	FC Spartak Kostroma	95	(8)

Managerial career
- 2011–2013: FC Gazprom transgaz Stavropol Ryzdvyany
- * Club domestic league appearances and goals

Vadim Vadimovich Sokolov (Russian: Вадим Вадимович Соколов; born 9 December 1971) is a retired Russian professional footballer who last worked as a manager of FC Gazprom transgaz Stavropol Ryzdvyany.

He made his professional debut in the Soviet Second League B in 1991 for FC Signal Izobilny.
