= Ivan Pazyomov =

Russian footballer

Personal information
- Full name: Ivan Vladimirovich Pazyomov
- Date of birth: 23 July 1973 (age 53)
- Height: 1.80 m (5 ft 11 in)
- Position: Striker

Youth career
- SDYuShOR-3 Sovetsky Raion Moscow
- FC Spartak Moscow

Senior career*
Years	Team	Apps	(Gls)
1991–1995	Torpedo Moscow	57	(12)
1996	Étoile Sportive du Sahel		
1996	Torpedo-Luzhniki Moscow	6	(0)
1997	FC Tyumen	0	(0)
1998	Tom Tomsk	22	(1)

International career
1994	Russia U-21	3	(2)
- * Club domestic league appearances and goals

Ivan Vladimirovich Pazyomov (Russian: Иван Владимирович Пазёмов; born 23 July 1973) is a Russian former professional footballer.

== Club career ==
He made his professional debut in the Russian Premier League in 1992 for FC Torpedo Moscow.

== Honours ==
- Russian Cup winner: 1993.

== European club competitions ==
With FC Torpedo Moscow.

- UEFA Cup 1992–93: 2 games.
- UEFA Cup Winners' Cup 1993–94: 1 game.
- UEFA Cup 1996–97: 2 games.
