= Yevgeni Shkilov =

Russian footballer and coach

Yevgeni Shkilov Евгений Шкилов
Personal information
- Full name: Yevgeni Vladimirovich Shkilov
- Date of birth: 2 February 1965 (age 61)
- Height: 1.87 m (6 ft 1 1/2 in)
- Positions: Midfielder; forward

Senior career*
Years	Team	Apps	(Gls)
1988–1991	FC Amur Blagoveshchensk	140	(28)
1992–1993	FC Rotor Volgograd	34	(6)
1993–1994	Hapoel Haifa F.C.	5	(1)
1994–1997	FC Luch Vladivostok	100	(19)
2000	FC Amur-Energiya Blagoveshchensk	15	(5)

Managerial career
- 2006–2008: FC Amur Blagoveshchensk (assistant)
- 2009: FC Amur Blagoveshchensk (director)
- 2011–2013: FC Amur-2010 Blagoveshchensk (assistant)
- 2013: FC Amur-2010 Blagoveshchensk
- * Club domestic league appearances and goals

Yevgeni Vladimirovich Shkilov (Russian: Евгений Владимирович Шкилов; born 2 February 1965) is a Russian professional football coach and a former player.

== Club career ==
He made his professional debut in the Soviet Second League in 1988 for FC Amur Blagoveshchensk.

== Honours ==
- Russian Premier League runner-up: 1993.
