= Dmitri Kudinov (footballer, born 1971) =

Russian footballer

Personal information
- Full name: Dmitri Anatolyevich Kudinov
- Date of birth: 17 March 1971 (age 55)
- Height: 1.72 m (5 ft 7 1/2 in)
- Positions: Forward; midfielder

Senior career*
Years	Team	Apps	(Gls)
1988	Terek Grozny	12	(3)
1988–1991	Tom Tomsk	60	(16)
1992–1993	Terek Grozny	59	(14)
1994–1996	Dynamo Stavropol	91	(4)
1994–1996	→ Dynamo-d Stavropol (loans)	12	(4)
1997–2000	Tom Tomsk	116	(19)
2001	Terek Grozny	22	(2)
2001–2002	Qarabağ-Azersun	24	(13)
2002	Zhemchuzhina Budyonnovsk	4	(0)
2003–2004	Qarabağ-Azersun	16	(9)
2004	Sibiryak Bratsk	24	(5)
2006	Biolog Novokubansk (amateur)		
2007	Torpedo Armavir (amateur)		
- * Club domestic league appearances and goals

Dmitri Anatolyevich Kudinov (Russian: Дмитрий Анатольевич Кудинов; born 17 March 1971) is a Russian former football player.
