= Sergei Nechay =

Russian footballer

Serhiy Nechay
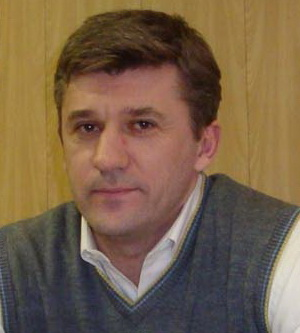

Personal information
- Full name: Sergei Vasilyevich Nechay
- Date of birth: 10 December 1966 (age 59)
- Place of birth: Luhansk, Ukrainian SSR
- Height: 1.81 m (5 ft 11 1/2 in)
- Position: Defender

Senior career*
Years	Team	Apps	(Gls)
1987	FC Zarya Voroshilovgrad	0	(0)
1988	PFC Nyva Vinnytsia	4	(0)
1990	FC Shahtar Pavlohrad	7	(0)
1990	FC Torpedo Taganrog	17	(0)
1991	PFC Nyva Vinnytsia	7	(0)
1991–1992	FC Torpedo Taganrog	67	(6)
1993–1995	FC Rotor Volgograd	74	(2)
1995–1999	FC Rostselmash Rostov-on-Don	65	(2)
1999	FC Dynamo Stavropol	16	(2)
2000	FC Sodovik Sterlitamak	29	(0)
2001	FC Kuzbass-Dynamo Kemerovo	13	(0)
2001	FC Taganrog (amateur)		
2001–2005	FC Bataysk (amateur)		

Managerial career
- 2006: FC Rostov (deputy director)
- 2006: FC Rostov (director)
- 2007: FC Rostov (deputy general director)
- 2007: FC Moscow (scout)
- 2011–2015: FC Rotor Volgograd (general director)
- 2015: FC MITOS Novocherkassk (general director)
- * Club domestic league appearances and goals

Sergei Vasilyevich Nechay (Russian: Серге́й Васильевич Нечай, Ukrainian: Cергій Нечай; born 10 December 1968) is a Russian professional football official and a former player. He made his professional debut in the Soviet Second League in 1989 for PFC Nyva Vinnytsia.

== Honours ==
- Russian Premier League runner-up: 1993.
- Russian Cup finalist: 1995.

== European club competitions ==
- UEFA Cup 1994–95 with FC Rotor Volgograd: 2 games, 1 goal.
- UEFA Intertoto Cup 1999 with FC Rostselmash Rostov-on-Don: 1 game.
