= Nikolai Pisarev =

Russian footballer

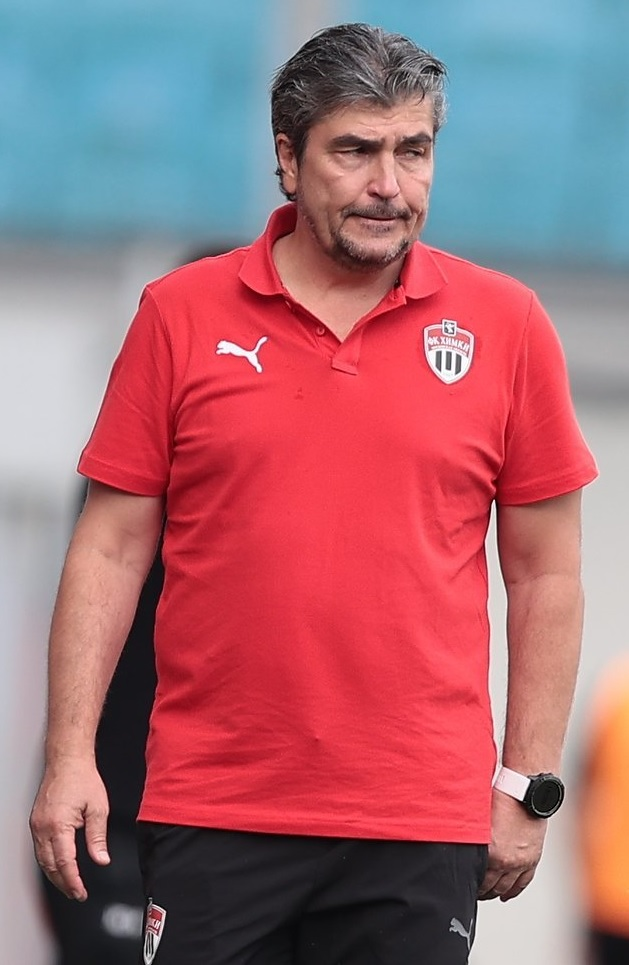
- Pisarev coaching Khimki in 2022

Personal information
- Full name: Nikolai Nikolayevich Pisarev
- Date of birth: 23 November 1968 (age 57)
- Place of birth: Moscow, Russian SFSR, Soviet Union
- Height: 1.76 m (5 ft 9 in)
- Position: Striker

Team information
- Current team: Russia (assistant coach)

Youth career
- Torpedo Moscow

Senior career*
Years	Team	Apps	(Gls)
1986–1989	Torpedo Moscow	29	(7)
1990–1992	FC Winterthur	?	(14)
1992–1995	Spartak Moscow	76	(22)
1995–1997	Mérida	20	(0)
1996–1997	→ FC St. Pauli (loan)	21	(4)
1998	Spartak Moscow	17	(7)
1999	Dynamo Moscow	16	(4)
2000–2001	Spartak Moscow	22	(3)
2001	Torpedo-ZIL	8	(0)

International career
1995	Russia	3	(1)

Managerial career
- 2002: FC Krasnoznamensk (assistant)
- 2002: Krylia Sovetov (assistant)
- 2003: FC Uralan Elista (assistant)
- 2005–2010: Russia (beach soccer)
- 2010–2015: Russia U-21
- 2016–2017: Russia U-21
- 2017–2018: FC Olimpiyets Nizhny Novgorod
- 2018–2019: FC Urozhay
- 2021–: Russia (assistant)
- 2022: Khimki
- 2023–2024: Krasnodar-2
- * Club domestic league appearances and goals

Nikolai Nikolayevich Pisarev (Russian: Николай Николаевич Писарев; born 23 November 1968) is a Russian football manager and a former player. He is an assistant coach with Russia national football team.

== International career ==
Pisarev played his first game for Russia on 8 March 1995 in a friendly against Slovakia. He scored a goal in the UEFA Euro 1996 qualifier against Faroe Islands.

== Coaching career ==
On 26 July 2021, he was hired as an assistant to Valeri Karpin in the Russia national football team. On 10 August 2022, Pisarev was hired as a manager by Russian Premier League club Khimki, also keeping his national team position (the national team was banned by FIFA at the time due to the 2022 Russian invasion of Ukraine and was not playing any competitive games). Pisarev was dismissed by Khimki on 2 September 2022, after the team lost all four games since his appointment.

On 11 August 2023, Pisarev was hired as the manager of Krasnodar-2, while also keeping his national team position. He left Krasnodar-2 in April 2024.

== Career statistics ==
Scores and results list Russia's goal tally first, score column indicates score after each Pisarev goal.

List of international goals scored by Nikolai Pisarev
No.	Date	Venue	Opponent	Score	Result	Competition
1	6 May 1995	Luzhniki Stadium, Moscow, Russia	Faroe Islands	2–0	3–0	UEFA Euro 1996 qualification

== Honours ==
Spartak Moscow

- Russian Premier League: 1992, 1993, 1994, 1998, 2000, 2001
- Russian Cup: 1994

Russia U21

- UEFA European Under-21 Championship: 1990
