= Igor Menshchikov =

Russian footballer and coach

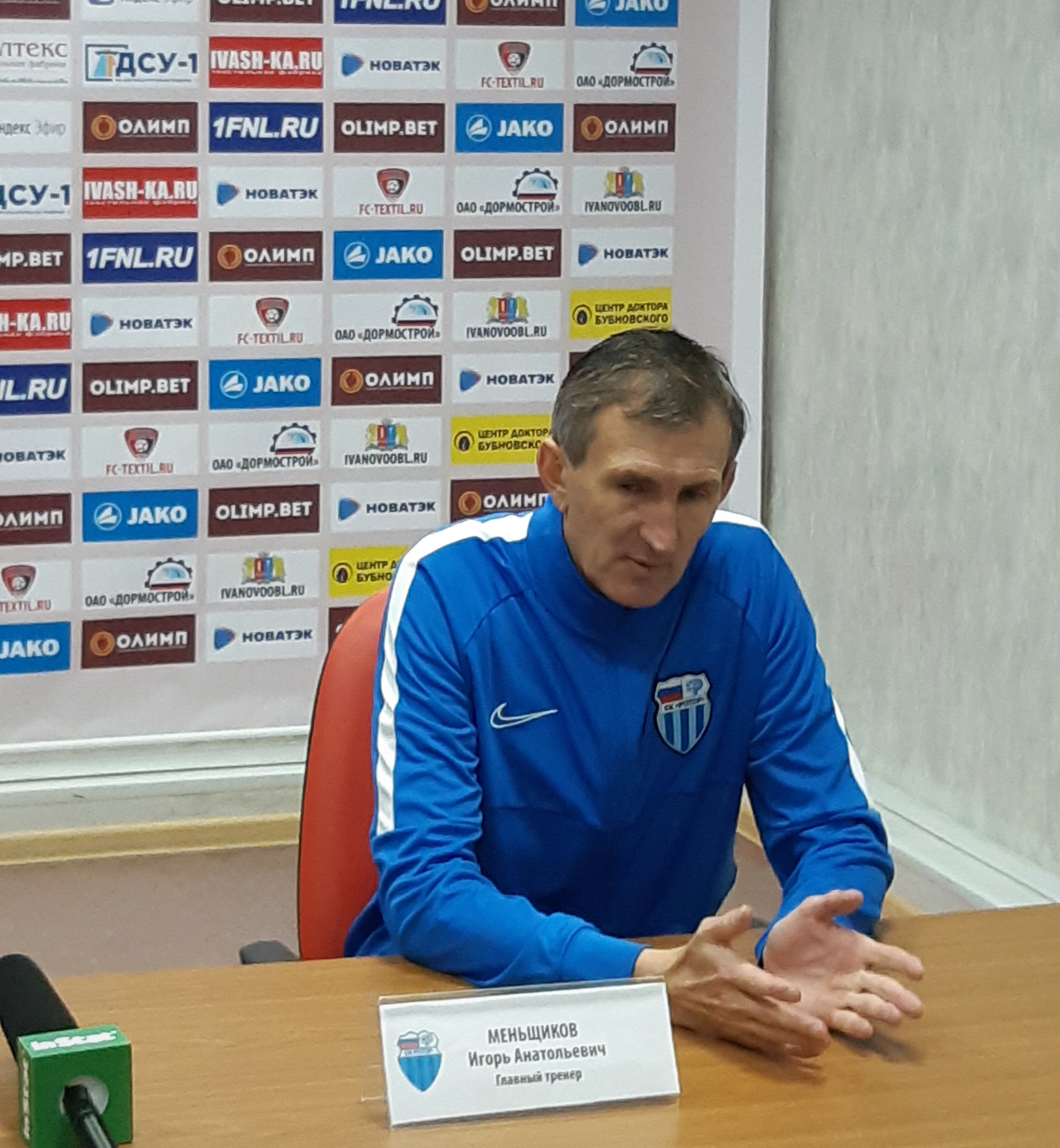

Personal information
- Full name: Igor Anatolyevich Menshchikov
- Date of birth: 26 July 1970 (age 56)
- Place of birth: Surgut, Russian SFSR
- Height: 1.94 m (6 ft 4 1/2 in)
- Positions: Midfielder; forward

Team information
- Current team: FC Arsenal Tula (assistant coach)

Senior career*
Years	Team	Apps	(Gls)
1990–1995	FC Rotor Volgograd	96	(8)
1996–1998	FC Metallurg Lipetsk	98	(35)
1998–2000	FC Saturn Ramenskoye	61	(7)
2000–2001	FC Rubin Kazan	25	(5)
2001	FC Metallurg Lipetsk	22	(5)
2002	FC Uralan Elista	1	(0)
2002	FC Kristall Smolensk	9	(6)
2003	FC Lisma-Mordovia Saransk	22	(0)
2003	FC Lada-SOK Dimitrovgrad	10	(2)
2004–2007	FC Torpedo Vladimir	98	(13)

Managerial career
- 2008–2009: FC Rotor Volgograd
- 2010: FC SOYUZ-Gazprom Izhevsk
- 2011: FC Sokol Saratov
- 2012–2013: FC Tyumen (assistant)
- 2013–2018: FC Zenit-Izhevsk
- 2019: FC Rotor Volgograd
- 2019–2025: FC Tyumen
- 2026–: FC Arsenal Tula (assistant)
- * Club domestic league appearances and goals

Igor Anatolyevich Menshchikov (Russian: Игорь Анатольевич Меньщиков; born 26 July 1970) is a Russian professional football coach and a former player who is an assistant coach with FC Arsenal Tula.

== Playing career ==
As a player, he made his debut in the Russian First League in 1991 for FC Rotor Volgograd. Menshchikov had two spells playing for FC Metallurg Lipetsk.

== Honours ==
=== Player ===
- Russian Premier League runner-up: 1993.
- Russian Cup finalist: 1995.
- Russian Second Division Zone West best midfielder: 2004.

=== Coach ===
- Russian Professional Football League Zone Ural-Povolzhye best coach: 2016–17.
- Russian Second League Zone 4 winner (promoted with FC Tyumen): 2022–23.
