= Russian Cup (football) =

- Organiser(s): Russian Football Union
- Founded: 1992; 34 years ago
- Region: Russia
- Teams: 107
- Qualifier for: UEFA Europa League (Note: Prior to 2022 Russian invasion of Ukraine.)
- Domestic cup: Russian Super Cup
- Current champions: Spartak Moscow (5th title)
- Most championships: CSKA Moscow; Lokomotiv Moscow (9 titles each)
- Website: rfs.ru/cup
- 2026–27 Russian Cup

The Russian Cup (Russian: Кубок России) is a football competition held annually by the Football Union of Russia for professional and some amateur (only after a special permission and licensing by Russian Football Union) football clubs.

The winner of the competition ordinarily got a spot in the UEFA Europa League first qualifying round. However, all Russian clubs, as well as the national team, have been barred from European competition due to Russia's invasion of Ukraine.

== Competition system ==
The competition had historically been held under knockout format. Second Division teams started from 1/512, 1/256, or 1/128 final stage, depending on the number of teams in the corresponding Second Division zone. First Division teams entered the tournament at 1/32 final stage, and Premier League teams at the 1/16 final stage. All ties were one-legged.

In 2020–21 and 2021–22, an "Elite group round" was added after the 1/64 final stage where all Premier League teams except those competing in UEFA competitions entered, which replaced the 1/32 and 1/16 final stages. Premier League teams competing in UEFA competitions were slotted into the Round of 16. All ties remained one-legged, with the Elite group round being single round robin.

Due to the Russian invasion of Ukraine barring Russian sides from competing in Europe, the cup was reformatted again from 2022–23. Premier League clubs would be placed in their own path (known as the "RPL path") beginning with a double round robin group stage, while First Division, Second Division and amateur clubs (including teams from media football) would be separated into the "Regions path" maintaining a traditional knockout format. The two paths act as a double elimination bracket in the knockout stage (after the RPL group stage and Regions round 6), with the RPL path having two-legged ties and the Regions path having one-legged ties.

The final tie is played as a single match; it is held in Moscow, but from 2009 to 2021 it moved around the country. First round matches are usually played in August, with the final being played the following year in June, so each Russian Cup competition lasts for just under a year.

== Finals ==
The Russian Cup has been played since 1992. The finals have produced the following results:

Season	Winners	Score	Runners-up	Venue	Attendance
1992–93	Torpedo Moscow (1); 8' Savichev; Penalties: (penalty scored) Afanasyev; (penalty scored) Novgorodov; (penalty scored) Pazyomov; (penalty scored) Arefyev; (penalty scored) Ulyanov	1–1 (a.e.t.); 5–3 (p)	CSKA Moscow; 20' Faizulin; Penalties: (penalty missed) Antonovich; (penalty scored) Dudnik; (penalty scored) Minko; (penalty scored) Mamchur	Luzhniki Stadium, Moscow	20,000
1993–94	Spartak Moscow (1); 6' Ledyakhov; 11' Karpin; Penalties: (penalty scored) Ledyakhov; (penalty scored) Onopko; (penalty scored) Ternavsky; (penalty scored) Alenichev	2–2 (a.e.t.); 4–2 (p)	CSKA Moscow; 39' Radimov; 58' Bystrov; Penalties: (penalty scored) Grishin; (penalty missed) Bushmanov; (penalty missed) Kupriyanov; (penalty scored) Bystrov	Luzhniki Stadium, Moscow	30,000
1994–95	Dynamo Moscow (1); Penalties: (penalty scored) Nekrasov; (penalty scored) Ishkinin; (penalty scored) Samatov; (penalty scored) Kutsenko; (penalty scored) Yakhimovich; (penalty scored) Bogomolov; (penalty scored) Safronov; (penalty scored) Shulgin	0–0 (a.e.t.); 8–7 (p)	Rotor Volgograd; Penalties: (penalty scored) Veretennikov; (penalty scored) Bondar; (penalty scored) Burlachenko; (penalty scored) Menshchikov; (penalty scored) Troynin; (penalty scored) Nechay; (penalty scored) Zhunenko; (penalty missed) Korniyets	Luzhniki Stadium, Moscow	20,000
1995–96	Lokomotiv Moscow (1); 10', 43' Kosolapov; 85' Drozdov	3–2	Spartak Moscow; 22' Lipko; 30' Nikiforov	Dynamo Stadium, Moscow	20,000
1996–97	Lokomotiv Moscow (2); 25' Smirnov; 78' Kharlachyov	2–0	Dynamo Moscow	Torpedo Stadium, Moscow	13,800
1997–98	Spartak Moscow (2); 86' Tikhonov	1–0	Lokomotiv Moscow	Luzhniki Stadium, Moscow	36,800
1998–99	Zenit Saint Petersburg (1); 57', 59' Panov; 65' Maksymyuk	3–1	Dynamo Moscow; 26' Pisarev	Luzhniki Stadium, Moscow	22,000
1999–2000	Lokomotiv Moscow (3); 41' Yevseyev; 96' Bulykin; 113' Tsymbalar	3–2 (a.e.t.)	CSKA Moscow; 32' Semak; 120+1' Kornaukhov	Dynamo Stadium, Moscow	26,000
2000–01	Lokomotiv Moscow (4); 90+4' Janashia; Penalties: (penalty scored) Izmaylov; (penalty scored) Lekgetho; (penalty missed) Chugaynov; (penalty scored) Maminov; (penalty scored) Loskov	1–1 (a.e.t.); 4–3 (p)	Anzhi Makhachkala; 90' Sirkhayev; Penalties: (penalty scored) Agalarov; (penalty missed) Akayev; (penalty scored) Sirkhayev; (penalty missed) Rahimić; (penalty scored) Yaskovich	Dynamo Stadium, Moscow	8,500
2001–02	CSKA Moscow (1); 30' Solomatin; 52' Yanovsky	2–0	Zenit Saint Petersburg	Luzhniki Stadium, Moscow	48,000
2002–03	Spartak Moscow (3); 28' Titov	1–0	Rostov	Lokomotiv Stadium, Moscow	22,000
2003–04	Terek Grozny (1); 90+2' Fedkov	1–0	Krylia Sovetov Samara	Lokomotiv Stadium, Moscow	17,000
2004–05	CSKA Moscow (2); 68' Zhirkov	1–0	Khimki	Lokomotiv Stadium, Moscow	25,000
2005–06	CSKA Moscow (3); 43', 90+3' Jô; 90' Vágner Love	3–0	Spartak Moscow	Luzhniki Stadium, Moscow	67,000
2006–07	Lokomotiv Moscow (5); 102' O'Connor	1–0 (a.e.t.)	FC Moscow	Luzhniki Stadium, Moscow	45,000
2007–08	CSKA Moscow (4); 65' Vágner Love; 75' Jô; Penalties: (penalty scored) Zhirkov; (penalty scored) Vágner Love; (penalty scored) Jô; (penalty scored) Janczyk	2–2 (a.e.t.); 4–1 (p)	Amkar Perm; 57' Drinčić; 64' Dujmović; Penalties: (penalty missed) Drinčić; (penalty scored) Kushev; (penalty missed) Dujmović	Lokomotiv Stadium, Moscow	24,000
2008–09	CSKA Moscow (5); 90+2' Aldonin	1–0	Rubin Kazan	Arena Khimki, Khimki	13,000
2009–10	Zenit Saint Petersburg (2); 60' (pen.) Shirokov	1–0	Sibir Novosibirsk	Olimp – 2, Rostov-on-Don	15,000
2010–11	CSKA Moscow (6); 13', 69' Doumbia	2–1	Alania Vladikavkaz; 23' Neco	Shinnik Stadium, Yaroslavl	12,900
2011–12	Rubin Kazan (1); 78' R. Yeryomenko	1–0	Dynamo Moscow	Central Stadium, Yekaterinburg	27,000
2012–13	CSKA Moscow (7); 11' Musa; Penalties: (penalty scored) Mamayev; (penalty scored) V. Berezutsky; (penalty missed) Musa; (penalty scored) Vágner Love; (penalty scored) Doumbia	1–1 (a.e.t.); 4–3 (p)	Anzhi Makhachkala; 74' Diarra; Penalties: (penalty scored) Boussoufa; (penalty missed) Zhirkov; (penalty scored) Willian; (penalty missed) Jucilei; (penalty scored) Eto'o	Terek Stadium, Grozny	28,000
2013–14	Rostov (1); Penalties: (penalty scored) Milić; (penalty scored) Poloz; (penalty scored) Dyakov; (penalty scored) Sinama Pongolle; (penalty scored) Dzyuba; (penalty missed) Gațcan; (penalty scored) Lolo	0–0 (a.e.t.); 6–5 (p)	FC Krasnodar; Penalties: (penalty scored) Granqvist; (penalty scored) Abreu; (penalty scored) Laborde; (penalty scored) Joãozinho; (penalty scored) Ari; (penalty missed) Sigurðsson; (penalty missed) Gazinsky	Anzhi-Arena, Kaspiysk	19,500
2014–15	Lokomotiv Moscow (6); 73' Niasse; 104' Boussoufa; 111' Al. Miranchuk	3–1 (a.e.t.)	Kuban Krasnodar; 28' Ignatyev	Central Stadium, Astrakhan	16,000
2015–16	Zenit Saint Petersburg (3); 34', 63' Hulk; 55' Kokorin; 69' Yusupov	4–1	CSKA Moscow; 36' Olanare	Kazan Arena, Kazan	36,600
2016–17	Lokomotiv Moscow (7); 76' I. Denisov; 90' Al. Miranchuk	2–0	Ural Yekaterinburg	Fisht Olympic Stadium, Olympic Park, Sochi	24,500
2017–18	Tosno (1); 11' Skvortsov; 80' Mirzov	2–1	Avangard Kursk; 16' Kireyev	Volgograd Arena, Volgograd	40,373
2018–19	Lokomotiv Moscow (8); 27' Barinov	1–0	Ural Yekaterinburg	Samara Arena, Samara	38,018
2019–20	Zenit Saint Petersburg (4); 84' (pen.) Dzyuba	1–0	Khimki	Central Stadium, Yekaterinburg	3,408
2020–21	Lokomotiv Moscow (9); 18' Kamano; 48' (pen.) Smolov; 84' Murilo	3–1	Krylia Sovetov Samara; 22' Sarveli	Nizhny Novgorod Stadium, Nizhny Novgorod	20,808
2021–22	Spartak Moscow (4); 10' Sobolev; 72' Promes	2–1	Dynamo Moscow; 55' Zakharyan	Luzhniki Stadium, Moscow	69,306
2022–23	CSKA Moscow (8); 32' (pen.) Chalov; Penalties: (penalty scored) Chalov; (penalty scored) Diveyev; (penalty missed) Moisés; (penalty scored) Gajić; (penalty scored) Medina; (penalty scored) Carrascal; (penalty scored) Zabolotny	1–1; 6–5 (p)	FC Krasnodar; 50' Córdoba; Penalties: (penalty scored) Spertsyan; (penalty scored) Akhmetov; (penalty scored) Córdoba; (penalty missed) Batxi; (penalty scored) Alonso; (penalty scored) Ramírez; (penalty missed) Olusegun	Luzhniki Stadium, Moscow	53,425
2023–24	Zenit Saint Petersburg (5); 81' Nino; 90+5' Alip	2–1	Baltika Kaliningrad; 40' Fernandes	Luzhniki Stadium, Moscow	41,776
2024–25	CSKA Moscow (9); Penalties: (penalty scored) Pjanić; (penalty missed) Diveyev; (penalty scored) Oblyakov; (penalty scored) Kislyak; (penalty scored) Gajić	0–0; 4–3 (p)	Rostov; Penalties: (penalty missed) Bayramyan; (penalty scored) Komlichenko; (penalty missed) Sutormin; (penalty scored) Sako; (penalty scored) Osipenko	Luzhniki Stadium, Moscow	57,176
2025–26	Spartak Moscow (5); 36' Solari; Penalties: (penalty scored) Dmitriyev; (penalty scored) Umyarov; (penalty scored) Wooh; (penalty scored) Barco	1–1; 4–3 (p)	Krasnodar; 57' Augusto; Penalties: (penalty scored) Spertsyan; (penalty scored) Olaza; (penalty scored) Krivtsov; (penalty missed) Boselli; (penalty missed) Pina	Luzhniki Stadium, Moscow	72,928

== Performance by club ==
Club	Winners	Runners-up	Winning years	Runner-up years
CSKA Moscow	9	4	2002, 2005, 2006, 2008, 2009, 2011, 2013, 2023, 2025	1993, 1994, 2000, 2016
Lokomotiv Moscow	9	1	1996, 1997, 2000, 2001, 2007, 2015, 2017, 2019, 2021	1998
Spartak Moscow	5	2	1994, 1998, 2003, 2022, 2026	1996, 2006
Zenit Saint Petersburg	5	1	1999, 2010, 2016, 2020, 2024	2002
Dynamo Moscow	1	4	1995	1997, 1999, 2012, 2022
Rostov	1	2	2014	2003, 2025
Rubin Kazan	1	1	2012	2009
Torpedo Moscow	1	–	1993	–
Akhmat Grozny	1	–	2004	–
Tosno	1	–	2018	–
FC Krasnodar	–	3	–	2014, 2023, 2026
Anzhi Makhachkala	–	2	–	2001, 2013
Ural Yekaterinburg	–	2	–	2017, 2019
Khimki	–	2	–	2005, 2020
Krylia Sovetov Samara	–	2	–	2004, 2021
Rotor Volgograd	–	1	–	1995
FC Moscow	–	1	–	2007
Amkar Perm	–	1	–	2008
Sibir Novosibirsk	–	1	–	2010
Alania Vladikavkaz	–	1	–	2011
Kuban Krasnodar	–	1	–	2015
Avangard Kursk	–	1	–	2018
Baltika Kaliningrad	–	1	–	2024
Total	32	32		

== See also ==
- Football in Russia
- Soviet Cup
- Media Football League
