= Sergei Nekrasov =

Russian footballer (1973–2026)

Personal information
- Date of birth: 29 January 1973
- Place of birth: Moscow, Russian SFSR, USSR
- Date of death: 9 March 2026 (aged 53)
- Height: 1.90 m (6 ft 3 in)
- Positions: Defender; midfielder

Youth career
- 1981–1991: Dynamo Moscow

Senior career*
Years	Team	Apps	(Gls)
1992–1999	Dynamo Moscow	149	(12)
2000–2001	Anzhi Makhachkala	0	(0)
2001	Khimki	19	(3)
2002	Zvezda Irkutsk	13	(2)
2003	Titan Moscow	16	(2)
2004	FC Vidnoye	15	(1)
2005	Zorky Krasnogorsk (amateur)		
2006–2007	FC Senezh Solnechnogorsk		

International career
1994–1995	Russia U21	13	(2)
1998	Russia	1	(0)
- * Club domestic league appearances and goals

Sergei Vladimirovich Nekrasov (Russian: Сергей Владимирович Некрасов; 29 January 1973 – 9 March 2026) was a Russian footballer who played as a defender and midfielder.

== International career ==
Nekrasov played his only game for Russia on 11 November 1998 in a friendly against Brazil.

== Personal life and death ==
His younger brother Igor Nekrasov also played football professionally. In 2025, he was reported to have died, with no mention of the exact death day or circumstances.

Sergei Nekrasov died on 9 March 2026, at the age of 53, following an unspecified illness.

== Honours ==
Dynamo Moscow

- Russian Premier League: runner-up 1994; bronze 1993, 1997
- Russian Cup: 1995; runner-up 1997, 1999
