= FC Torpedo Georgiyevsk =

FC Torpedo (Georgiyevsk)
- Full name: Football Club Torpedo Georgiyevsk
- Founded: 1910
- Dissolved: 2005
- League: Amateur Football League, Zone South
- 2004: 11th

FC Torpedo Georgiyevsk (Russian: «Торпедо» (Георгиевск)) was a Russian football team from Georgiyevsk. The club debuted professionally in the Russian Third League in 1997. Their best result was 12th place in Russian Second Division, Zone South in 1998.

== Team name history ==
- 1910–2003: FC Torpedo Georgiyevsk
- 2003–2004: FC Torpedo-Mashuk Georgiyevsk
- 2007– : FC Torpedo Georgiyevsk
