= Yuriy Konovalov (footballer) =

Russian footballer

Personal information
- Full name: Yuriy Stepanovich Konovalov
- Date of birth: 3 February 1970 (age 56)
- Place of birth: Chelyabinsk, Russian SFSR
- Height: 1.82 m (5 ft 11 1/2 in)
- Position: Forward

Youth career
- SDYuShOR-3 Chelyabinsk
- Voskhod Chelyabinsk

Senior career*
Years	Team	Apps	(Gls)
1987	FC Lokomotiv Chelyabinsk	3	(0)
1988–1989	FC Strela Chelyabinsk		
1989–1990	FC Signal Chelyabinsk		
1990–1992	FC Zenit Chelyabinsk	61	(23)
1992–1993	FC Rotor Volgograd	18	(2)
1994–1995	FC Lokomotiv Nizhny Novgorod	28	(4)
1996–1997	FC Energiya Kamyshin	25	(1)
1997	FC Torpedo Volzhsky	11	(1)
1998	FC Lokomotiv Nizhny Novgorod	1	(0)
1998	FC Torpedo Volzhsky	25	(13)
1999	FC Tom Tomsk	16	(1)
2000	FC Nosta Novotroitsk	10	(2)
2000–2002	FC Zenit Chelyabinsk	65	(31)
2003	FC Neftyanik Ufa	15	(2)
2003–2005	FC Torpedo Miass (amateur)		
2006	FC Alyans Sosnovsky District		
- * Club domestic league appearances and goals

Yuriy Stepanovich Konovalov (Russian: Юрий Степанович Коновалов; born 3 February 1970) is a former Russian professional footballer.

== Club career ==
He made his professional debut in the Soviet Second League B in 1990 for FC Zenit Chelyabinsk.

He made his Russian Premier League debut for FC Rotor Volgograd on 9 July 1992 in a game against FC Krylia Sovetov Samara and spent 5 seasons in the RPL with Rotor, FC Lokomotiv Nizhny Novgorod and FC Energiya-Tekstilshchik Kamyshin.

== Personal life ==
He is a brother of Andrei Konovalov.
