= FC Zvezda Gorodishche =

- Full name: Football Club Zvezda Gorodishche
- Founded: 1989
- Dissolved: 1997
- League: Russian Third League, Zone 2
- 1996: 6th

FC Zvezda Gorodishche (Russian: «Звезда» (Городище)) was a Russian football team from Gorodishche, Volgograd Oblast. It played professionally from 1989 to 1996. Their best result was 2nd place in Zone 2 of the Russian Second Division in 1993.

== Team name history ==
- 1989–1991: FC Zvezda Gorodishche
- 1992–1993: FC Zvezda-Rus Gorodishche
- 1994–1996: FC Zvezda Gorodishche
