= Aleksandr Bondar (footballer) =

Russian footballer (born 1967)

Aleksandr Bondar Александр Бондарь
Personal information
- Full name: Aleksandr Arkadyevich Bondar
- Date of birth: November 21, 1967 (age 59)
- Place of birth: Magdeburg, East Germany
- Height: 1.83 m (6 ft 0 in)
- Positions: Defender; midfielder

Youth career
- FC Terek Grozny

Senior career*
Years	Team	Apps	(Gls)
1984–1988	FC Terek Grozny	116	(11)
1989–1990	FC Rostselmash Rostov-on-Don	53	(4)
1990	FC Terek Grozny	12	(2)
1991	FC Dynamo Moscow	1	(0)
1991–1992	FC Terek Grozny	56	(6)
1993	FC Spartak Moscow	2	(0)
1993	FC Terek Grozny	6	(1)
1993–1994	Maccabi Yavne F.C.		
1994	FC Dynamo Stavropol	27	(1)
1995	FC Rotor Volgograd	18	(1)
1996–1998	FC Rostselmash Rostov-on-Don	40	(1)
1999	FC Volgar-Gazprom Astrakhan	24	(1)
2000	FC Tsentr-R-Kavkaz Krasnodar		
2001–2002	FC Terek Grozny	60	(5)

Managerial career
- 2003: FC Terek Grozny (director of sports)
- 2005: FC Terek Grozny (director of sports)
- 2006: FC SKA Rostov-on-Don (director of sports)
- 2007–2008: FC Nika Krasny Sulin (director)
- 2010: FC Dynamo Stavropol (administrator)
- 2012: FC SKA Rostov-on-Don (director)
- * Club domestic league appearances and goals

Aleksandr Arkadyevich Bondar (Russian: Александр Аркадьевич Бондарь; born 21 November 1967) is a Russian professional football official and a former player.

== Club career ==
He made his debut in the Soviet Top League in 1991 for FC Dynamo Moscow. He played 1 game for FC Spartak Moscow in the European Cup Winners' Cup 1992–93 (in a winning quarterfinal return leg against Feyenoord).

== Honours ==
- Russian Premier League champion: 1993.
- Russian Cup finalist: 1995.
