= Oleg Veretennikov =

Russian footballer

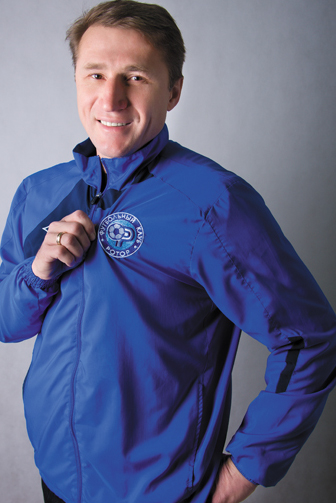
- Veretennikov as Rotor Volgograd manager in 2013

Personal information
- Full name: Oleg Aleksandrovich Veretennikov
- Date of birth: 5 January 1970 (age 56)
- Place of birth: Revda, Soviet Union
- Height: 1.85 m (6 ft 1 in)
- Position: Midfielder

Senior career*
Years	Team	Apps	(Gls)
1986–1987	Uralmash	10	(1)
1988	Uralets Nizhny Tagil	0	(0)
1988	Uralmash	29	(2)
1989	Metallurg Sverdlovsk	7	(0)
1989	Chayka-CSKA-2 Moscow	8	(0)
1989–1990	SKA Rostov	57	(27)
1991–1992	Uralmash	42	(14)
1992–1999	Rotor Volgograd	247	(141)
2000	Aris	7	(1)
2000–2001	Lierse	18	(3)
2001–2002	Sokol	27	(2)
2002	SKA Rostov	10	(2)
2003	Lisma-Mordovia Saransk	40	(18)
2004	Uralan Elista	19	(2)
2004	Zhenis Astana	14	(4)
2005–2007	Rotor Volgograd	66	(29)
2007	Irtysh	13	(2)
2008	Astana	30	(7)
2009	Volgograd	33	(7)
Total		677	(262)

International career
1996	Russia	4	(0)

Managerial career
- 2010–2014: Rotor Volgograd (assistant)
- 2014–2015: Rotor Volgograd
- 2015: Luch-Energiya
- 2016–2017: Orenburg (U-21)
- 2017: Tobol (assistant)
- 2019–2020: Rotor-2 Volgograd
- 2020–2022: Rubin Kazan (assistant)
- 2023–2024: Krasnodar-2 (assistant)
- 2024: Krasnodar-2
- 2024: Kuban Krasnodar (assistant)
- 2025–2026: Shanghai Shenhua (assistant)
- * Club domestic league appearances and goals

Oleg Aleksandrovich Veretennikov (Russian: Олег Александрович Веретенников; born 5 January 1970) is a professional Russian association football coach and a former international footballer. He is the runner-up goalscorer in the history of Russian Premier League, and holds several other goalscoring records.

== Biography ==
Most of Veretennikov's successes have come with SC Rotor Volgograd, for whom he played in 1992–1999. During that time he scored 143 goals. He has also become the season's top goalscorer three times (in 1995, 1997, and 1998), which is also an unbeaten record. Veretennikov also holds a record for the most goals scored in one season (25 in 1995). He is also one of only three players (along with Viktor Panchenko and Mateo Cassierra) to score five goals in a league match (on 4 April 1998 against Shinnik).

Despite impressive goalscoring record, Oleg Veretennikov played only four unimportant matches for the national team.

In 2000–2001 Veretennikov had two short spells with foreign clubs, and then played in several First Division teams. In 2005, he returned to Rotor, playing in the Second Division. In 2009, he played in FC Volgograd. In the end of 2009 Veretennikov retired from playing and became a coach.

His son Pavel Veretennikov is a professional footballer now.

== Career statistics ==
Club	Season	League			Ref.
Club	Season	Division	Apps	Goals	Ref.
Uralmash	1986	Soviet Second League (3rd tier)	1	0	
Uralmash	1987	Soviet Second League (3rd tier)	9	1	
Uralmash	Total		10	1	–
Uralets Nizhny Tagil	1988	Soviet Second League (3rd tier)	0	0	
Uralmash	1988	Soviet Second League (3rd tier)	26	2	
Metallurg Sverdlovsk	1989	Soviet Second League (3rd tier)	7	0	
CSKA-2 Moscow	1989	Soviet Second League (3rd tier)	8	0	
SKA Rostov	1989	Soviet First League (2nd tier)	16	1	
SKA Rostov	1990	Soviet Second League (3rd tier)	41	26	
SKA Rostov	Total		57	27	–
Uralmash	1991	Soviet First League (2nd tier)	42	14	
Uralmash	1992	Russian Premier League (1st tier)	0	0	
Uralmash	Total		42	14	–
Rotor Volgograd	1992	Russian Premier League (1st tier)	28	10	
Rotor Volgograd	1993	Russian Premier League (1st tier)	33	19	
Rotor Volgograd	1994	Russian Premier League (1st tier)	30	12	
Rotor Volgograd	1995	Russian Premier League (1st tier)	29	25	
Rotor Volgograd	1996	Russian Premier League (1st tier)	33	19	
Rotor Volgograd	1997	Russian Premier League (1st tier)	34	22	
Rotor Volgograd	1998	Russian Premier League (1st tier)	30	22	
Rotor Volgograd	1999	Russian Premier League (1st tier)	29	12	
Rotor Volgograd	Total		246	141	–
Rotor-2 Volgograd	1993	Russian Second Division (3rd tier)	1	0	
Rotor-2 Volgograd	1999	Russian Second Division (3rd tier)	3	1	
Rotor-2 Volgograd	Total		4	1	–
Aris	1999–00	Super League Greece (1st tier)	7	0	
Lierse	2000–01	Belgian First Division (1st tier)	18	3	
Sokol	2001	Russian Premier League (1st tier)	15	2	
Sokol	2002	Russian Premier League (1st tier)	12	0	
Sokol	Total		27	2	–
SKA Rostov	2002	Russian First Division (2nd tier)	9	2	
Lisma-Mordovia Saransk	2003	Russian First Division (2nd tier)	40	18	
FC Uralan Elista	2004	Russian First Division (2nd tier)	19	2	
Zhenis Astana	2004	Kazakhstan Premier League (1st tier)	14	4	
Rotor Volgograd	2005	Russian Second Division (3rd tier)	23	14	
Rotor Volgograd	2006	Russian Second Division (3rd tier)	30	11	
Rotor Volgograd	2007	Russian Second Division (3rd tier)	13	4	
Rotor Volgograd	Total		66	29	–
Irtysch	2007	Kazakhstan Premier League (1st tier)	13	2	
FC Astana	2008	Kazakhstan Premier League (1st tier)	30	7	
Career total			643	255	–

== Honours ==
- 1993 – Russian Premier League, runner-up
- 1995 – Russian Premier League, top scorer (25 goals)
- 1996 – Russian Premier League, 3rd position
- 1997 – Russian Premier League, runner-up
- 1997 – Russian Premier League, top scorer (22 goals)
- 1998 – Russian Premier League, top scorer (22 goals)
- 1993 – best attacking midfielder according to Sport-Express
- 1995 – best attacking midfielder according to Sport-Express
- 1997 – best attacking midfielder according to Sport-Express
- 1998 – best central midfielder according to Sport-Express
- 2005 – best player and best midfielder in the South Zone of Second Division according to Professional Football League.
- 2009 – best player and best midfielder of Russian Second Division, Zone South
