= FC Druzhba Arzamas =

- Full name: Football Club Druzhba Arzamas
- Founded: 1990; 35 years ago
- Dissolved: 2005; 20 years ago
- 2004: Amateur Football League, Zone Privolzhye, 18th

FC Druzhba Arzamas (Russian: ФК «Дружба» (Арзамас)) was a Russian football team from Arzamas. It played professionally from 1990 to 1999, including 2 seasons (1995 and 1996) in the second-highest Russian First Division.

== Team name history ==
- 1990–1991 Znamya Arzamas
- 1992–1999 Torpedo Arzamas
- 1999–2001 FC Arzamas
- 2002–2004 Druzhba Arzamas
