= 1992 Russian Top League =

1st season of top-tier football league in Russia

Russian Top League
- Season: 1992
- Champions: Spartak Moscow

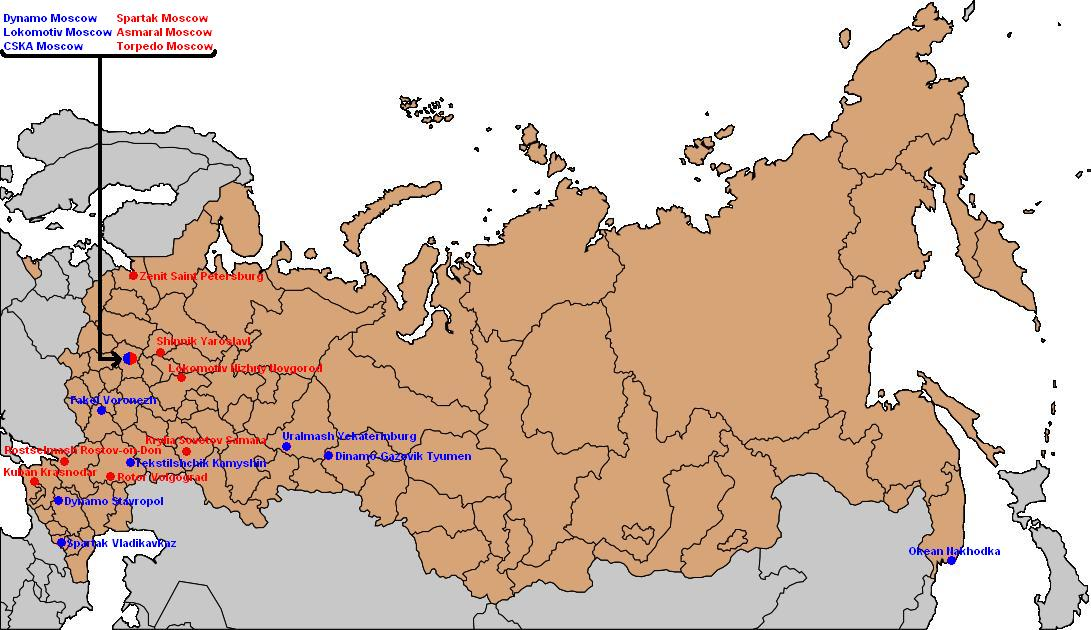
Location of Russian Top League clubs in 1992

Statistics of Russian Top League in season 1992.

== Overview ==
Twenty clubs of the former Soviet competition took place in this season. The league was combined out of six clubs of the Soviet Top League, 11 - Soviet First League, and the rest out of the promoted from the Buffer League (Center and East). FC Spartak Moscow won the championship.

The composition of groups may seem kind of uneven with four Top League clubs in Group A and two — in Group B. However the seeding was done upon the completion of the previous Soviet season with Rotor being conditionally promoted to the top level.

| Group | Team | Head coach | League and position in 1991 | |
|---|---|---|---|---|
| A | PFC CSKA Moscow | Pavel Sadyrin (until July) Gennadi Kostylev (from July) | Soviet Top League | 1 |
| B | FC Spartak Moscow | Oleg Romantsev | Soviet Top League | 2 |
| B | FC Torpedo Moscow | Yevgeni Skomorokhov (until August) Yury Mironov (from August) | Soviet Top League | 3 |
| A | FC Dynamo Moscow | Valery Gazzaev | Soviet Top League | 6 |
| A | FC Spartak Vladikavkaz | Aleksandr Novikov | Soviet Top League | 11 |
| A | FC Lokomotiv Moscow | Yuri Syomin | Soviet Top League | 16 |
| B | FC Rotor Volgograd | Viktor Papayev (until May) Vladimir Faizulin (from May) | Soviet First League | 1 |
| A | FC Uralmash Yekaterinburg | Nikolai Agafonov (until August) Viktor Shishkin (from August) | Soviet First League | 3 |
| B | FC Rostselmash Rostov-on-Don | Enver Yulgushov | Soviet First League | 4 |
| B | FC Lokomotiv Nizhny Novgorod | Valeri Ovchinnikov | Soviet First League | 8 |
| A | FC Tekstilshchik Kamyshin | Sergei Pavlov | Soviet First League | 11 |
| B | FC Shinnik Yaroslavl | Stanislav Vorotilin (until July) Valeri Frolov (from August) | Soviet First League | 12 |
| A | FC Fakel Voronezh | Fyodor Novikov (until July) Valeri Nenenko (from July) | Soviet First League | 13 |
| A | FC Dynamo Stavropol | Boris Stukalov (until July) Aleksandr Irkhin (from July) | Soviet First League | 16 |
| B | FC Zenit Saint Petersburg | Vyacheslav Melnikov | Soviet First League | 18 |
| A | FC Dynamo-Gazovik Tyumen | Serhiy Morozov (until May) Aleksei Petrushin (from May) | Soviet First League | 20 |
| B | FC Kuban Krasnodar | Yuri Marushkin (until July) Igor Kaleshin (from July) | Soviet First League | 21 |
| B | FC Asmaral Moscow | Konstantin Beskov | Soviet Second League, Center | 1 |
| B | FC Krylia Sovetov Samara | Viktor Antikhovich | Soviet Second League, Center | 2 |
| A | FC Okean Nakhodka | Aleksandr Averyanov | Soviet Second League, East | 1 |

== First stage ==
=== Group A ===
==== Table ====
| Pos | Team | Pld | W | D | L | GF | GA | GD | Pts | Qualification |
|---|---|---|---|---|---|---|---|---|---|---|
| 1 | Dynamo Moscow | 18 | 10 | 4 | 4 | 35 | 16 | +19 | 24 | Qualification to Championship Round |
| 2 | Lokomotiv Moscow | 18 | 9 | 6 | 3 | 23 | 14 | +9 | 24 | Qualification to Championship Round |
| 3 | Spartak Vladikavkaz | 18 | 9 | 5 | 4 | 31 | 18 | +13 | 23 | Qualification to Championship Round |
| 4 | CSKA Moscow | 18 | 9 | 5 | 4 | 29 | 20 | +9 | 23 | Qualification to Championship Round |
| 5 | Tekstilshchik Kamyshin | 18 | 8 | 5 | 5 | 20 | 17 | +3 | 21 | Qualification to Relegation Round |
| 6 | Uralmash Yekaterinburg | 18 | 8 | 3 | 7 | 28 | 29 | −1 | 19 | Qualification to Relegation Round |
| 7 | Okean Nakhodka | 18 | 7 | 4 | 7 | 24 | 25 | −1 | 18 | Qualification to Relegation Round |
| 8 | Fakel Voronezh | 18 | 4 | 6 | 8 | 10 | 19 | −9 | 14 | Qualification to Relegation Round |
| 9 | Dynamo Stavropol | 18 | 4 | 1 | 13 | 14 | 31 | −17 | 9 | Qualification to Relegation Round |
| 10 | Dynamo-Gazovik Tyumen | 18 | 2 | 1 | 15 | 11 | 36 | −25 | 5 | Qualification to Relegation Round |

Source: rsssf.com
Rules for classification: 1) points; 2) goal difference; 3) number of goals scored.

==== Results ====
| Home \ Away | CSK | DYN | DST | DGT | FAK | LOK | OKN | SPV | TEK | URA |
|---|---|---|---|---|---|---|---|---|---|---|
| CSKA Moscow | | 4–1 | 3–0 | 3–0 | 2–0 | 1–1 | 2–0 | 2–4 | 1–0 | 2–1 |
| Dynamo Moscow | 2–1 | | 3–1 | 1–0 | 5–0 | 0–0 | 3–0 | 3–1 | 4–0 | 6–2 |
| Dynamo Stavropol | 1–2 | 0–3 | | 3–0 | 2–1 | 0–1 | 2–1 | 0–2 | 0–0 | 2–1 |
| Dynamo-Gazovik Tyumen | 0–1 | 0–1 | 1–0 | | 0–1 | 0–3 | 3–3 | 1–0 | 0–2 | 2–3 |
| Fakel Voronezh | 1–1 | 1–0 | 2–1 | 1–0 | | 1–1 | 0–1 | 0–0 | 1–1 | 0–1 |
| Lokomotiv Moscow | 0–0 | 2–0 | 3–0 | 3–1 | 0–0 | | 2–1 | 0–3 | 1–0 | 1–0 |
| Okean Nakhodka | 5–2 | 1–1 | 2–0 | 1–0 | 0–0 | 1–3 | | 2–1 | 2–0 | 1–1 |
| Spartak Vladikavkaz | 2–0 | 0–0 | 2–1 | 4–1 | 2–1 | 0–0 | 3–1 | | 2–2 | 2–0 |
| Tekstilshchik Kamyshin | 1–1 | 1–1 | 1–0 | 1–0 | 1–0 | 3–1 | 1–0 | 3–2 | | 3–0 |
| Uralmash Yekaterinburg | 1–1 | 2–1 | 4–1 | 5–2 | 1–0 | 3–1 | 1–3 | 1–1 | 1–0 | |

Legend: Blue = home team win; Yellow = draw; Red = away team win.

=== Group B ===
==== Table ====
| Pos | Team | Pld | W | D | L | GF | GA | GD | Pts | Qualification |
|---|---|---|---|---|---|---|---|---|---|---|
| 1 | Spartak Moscow | 18 | 11 | 6 | 1 | 35 | 9 | +26 | 28 | Qualification to Championship Round |
| 2 | Asmaral Moscow | 18 | 11 | 4 | 3 | 34 | 21 | +13 | 26 | Qualification to Championship Round |
| 3 | Lokomotiv N.N. | 18 | 7 | 9 | 2 | 16 | 11 | +5 | 23 | Qualification to Championship Round |
| 4 | Rostselmash | 18 | 7 | 6 | 5 | 20 | 17 | +3 | 20 | Qualification to Championship Round |
| 5 | Krylia Sovetov Samara | 18 | 5 | 8 | 5 | 12 | 19 | −7 | 18 | Qualification to Relegation Round |
| 6 | Torpedo Moscow | 18 | 7 | 3 | 8 | 20 | 20 | 0 | 17 | Qualification to Relegation Round |
| 7 | Rotor Volgograd | 18 | 6 | 4 | 8 | 23 | 19 | +4 | 16 | Qualification to Relegation Round |
| 8 | Zenit St. Petersburg | 18 | 4 | 6 | 8 | 21 | 35 | −14 | 14 | Qualification to Relegation Round |
| 9 | Kuban Krasnodar | 18 | 3 | 6 | 9 | 19 | 30 | −11 | 12 | Qualification to Relegation Round |
| 10 | Shinnik Yaroslavl | 18 | 1 | 4 | 13 | 11 | 30 | −19 | 6 | Qualification to Relegation Round |

Source: rsssf.com
Rules for classification: 1) points; 2) goal difference; 3) number of goals scored.

==== Results ====
| Home \ Away | ASM | KRY | KUB | LNN | ROS | ROT | SHI | SPA | TOR | ZEN |
|---|---|---|---|---|---|---|---|---|---|---|
| Asmaral Moscow | | 0–0 | 3–1 | 0–0 | 1–0 | 2–1 | 1–2 | 1–1 | 2–1 | 8–3 |
| Krylia Sovetov Samara | 1–2 | | 1–0 | 1–1 | 1–0 | 0–0 | 1–0 | 1–1 | 2–1 | 1–0 |
| Kuban Krasnodar | 1–2 | 0–0 | | 0–0 | 0–2 | 0–1 | 2–1 | 1–5 | 1–3 | 2–2 |
| Lokomotiv N.N. | 2–1 | 1–0 | 3–3 | | 1–1 | 1–0 | 2–0 | 0–0 | 1–0 | 0–0 |
| Rostselmash | 0–1 | 1–1 | 1–1 | 0–0 | | 1–3 | 2–0 | 0–0 | 2–1 | 1–0 |
| Rotor Volgograd | 0–0 | 3–0 | 1–3 | 3–0 | 1–3 | | 1–0 | 1–3 | 0–1 | 6–1 |
| Shinnik Yaroslavl | 0–3 | 2–2 | 2–3 | 0–2 | 2–3 | 1–1 | | 0–1 | 0–2 | 1–1 |
| Spartak Moscow | 5–1 | 5–0 | 2–1 | 1–0 | 2–0 | 1–0 | 0–0 | | 1–1 | 4–0 |
| Torpedo Moscow | 1–2 | 2–0 | 0–0 | 0–1 | 1–1 | 1–0 | 1–0 | 0–3 | | 1–2 |
| Zenit St. Petersburg | 2–4 | 0–0 | 1–0 | 1–1 | 1–2 | 1–1 | 2–0 | 2–0 | 2–3 | |

Legend: Blue = home team win; Yellow = draw; Red = away team win.

== Final stage ==
The results of games played in the first stage were counted in the final stage.

By political agreement with UEFA and Ukraine, Russia inherited the access right of Soviet Union to the European competitions, while Ukraine obtained part of the rights of disbanded East Germany.

=== Championship Round ===
Tournament for places 1 to 8

==== Table ====
| Pos | Team | Pld | W | D | L | GF | GA | GD | Pts | Qualification |
|---|---|---|---|---|---|---|---|---|---|---|
| 1 | Spartak Moscow (C) | 14 | 10 | 4 | 0 | 36 | 12 | +24 | 24 | Qualification to Champions League first round |
| 2 | Spartak Vladikavkaz | 14 | 7 | 3 | 4 | 26 | 20 | +6 | 17 | Qualification to UEFA Cup first round |
| 3 | Dynamo Moscow | 14 | 6 | 4 | 4 | 26 | 21 | +5 | 16 | Qualification to UEFA Cup first round |
| 4 | Lokomotiv Moscow | 14 | 5 | 5 | 4 | 14 | 15 | −1 | 15 | Qualification to UEFA Cup first round |
| 5 | CSKA Moscow | 14 | 5 | 4 | 5 | 25 | 19 | +6 | 14 | |
| 6 | Lokomotiv N.N. | 14 | 2 | 7 | 5 | 10 | 18 | −8 | 11 | |
| 7 | Asmaral Moscow | 14 | 3 | 3 | 8 | 17 | 36 | −19 | 9 | |
| 8 | Rostselmash | 14 | 1 | 4 | 9 | 3 | 16 | −13 | 6 | |

Source: rsssf.com
Rules for classification: 1) points; 2) goal difference; 3) number of goals scored.
(C) Champions

==== Results ====
| Home \ Away | ASM | CSK | DYN | LOK | LNN | ROS | SPA | SPV |
|---|---|---|---|---|---|---|---|---|
| Asmaral Moscow | | 2–5 | 1–3 | 0–3 | | | | 3–3 |
| CSKA Moscow | 4–1 | | | | 0–2 | 4–0 | 1–2 | |
| Dynamo Moscow | 6–1 | | | | 1–1 | 1–1 | 2–5 | |
| Lokomotiv Moscow | 1–4 | | | | 1–1 | 1–0 | 0–1 | |
| Lokomotiv N.N. | | 1–1 | 0–2 | 1–3 | | | | 1–3 |
| Rostselmash | | 0–1 | 0–2 | 0–1 | | | | 1–0 |
| Spartak Moscow | | 1–1 | 4–3 | 4–1 | | | | 5–0 |
| Spartak Vladikavkaz | 3–0 | | | | 4–0 | 1–0 | 2–5 | |

Legend: Blue = home team win; Yellow = draw; Red = away team win.

=== Relegation Round ===
Tournament for places 9 to 20

==== Table ====
| Pos | Team | Pld | W | D | L | GF | GA | GD | Pts | Qualification or relegation |
|---|---|---|---|---|---|---|---|---|---|---|
| 9 | Uralmash Yekaterinburg | 22 | 12 | 6 | 4 | 40 | 21 | +19 | 30 | |
| 10 | Tekstilshchik Kamyshin | 22 | 12 | 4 | 6 | 23 | 13 | +10 | 28 | |
| 11 | Torpedo Moscow | 22 | 12 | 4 | 6 | 27 | 17 | +10 | 28 | Qualification to Cup Winners' Cup first round |
| 12 | Rotor Volgograd | 22 | 11 | 4 | 7 | 35 | 22 | +13 | 26 | |
| 13 | Okean Nakhodka | 22 | 10 | 5 | 7 | 26 | 26 | 0 | 25 | |
| 14 | Krylia Sovetov Samara | 22 | 9 | 7 | 6 | 22 | 16 | +6 | 25 | |
| 15 | Dynamo Stavropol | 22 | 10 | 4 | 8 | 27 | 23 | +4 | 24 | |
| 16 | Zenit St. Petersburg (R) | 22 | 9 | 6 | 7 | 30 | 25 | +5 | 24 | Relegation to First League |
| 17 | Fakel Voronezh (R) | 22 | 9 | 4 | 9 | 17 | 17 | 0 | 22 | Relegation to First League |
| 18 | Kuban Krasnodar (R) | 22 | 4 | 6 | 12 | 16 | 35 | −19 | 14 | Relegation to First League |
| 19 | Shinnik Yaroslavl (R) | 22 | 3 | 5 | 14 | 19 | 34 | −15 | 11 | Relegation to First League |
| 20 | Dynamo-Gazovik Tyumen (R) | 22 | 3 | 1 | 18 | 16 | 49 | −33 | 7 | Relegation to First League |

Source: rsssf.com
Rules for classification: 1) points; 2) goal difference; 3) number of goals scored.
(R) Relegated

==== Results ====
| Home \ Away | DST | DGT | FAK | KRY | KUB | OKN | ROT | SHI | TEK | TOR | URA | ZEN |
|---|---|---|---|---|---|---|---|---|---|---|---|---|
| Dynamo Stavropol | | | | 0–3 | 3–0 | | 4–2 | 1–0 | | 1–0 | | 3–0 |
| Dynamo-Gazovik Tyumen | | | | 1–0 | 1–0 | | 0–3 | 1–2 | | 1–2 | | 1–3 |
| Fakel Voronezh | | | | 1–0 | 2–0 | | 1–0 | 1–0 | | 1–1 | | 1–0 |
| Krylia Sovetov Samara | 0–0 | 4–0 | 1–0 | | | 3–1 | | | 2–0 | | 1–1 | |
| Kuban Krasnodar | 2–2 | 2–1 | 0–2 | | | 1–1 | | | 0–2 | | 0–0 | |
| Okean Nakhodka | | | | 1–0 | 2–0 | | 0–2 | 3–2 | | 0–0 | | 3–2 |
| Rotor Volgograd | 2–1 | 3–2 | 2–0 | | | 2–0 | | | 2–1 | | 2–2 | |
| Shinnik Yaroslavl | 0–0 | 3–0 | 1–1 | | | 1–2 | | | 2–0 | | 0–4 | |
| Tekstilshchik Kamyshin | | | | 1–1 | 1–0 | | 1–0 | 3–1 | | 3–0 | | 0–0 |
| Torpedo Moscow | 0–1 | 3–0 | 2–1 | | | 2–0 | | | 1–0 | | 1–1 | |
| Uralmash Yekaterinburg | | | | 2–0 | 6–0 | | 2–1 | 2–0 | | 1–0 | | 1–1 |
| Zenit St. Petersburg | 2–0 | 4–0 | 2–0 | | | 3–0 | | | 0–1 | | 1–0 | |

Legend: Blue = home team win; Yellow = draw; Red = away team win.

== Season statistics ==
=== Top goalscorers ===
Gasimov was the official top scorer as Matveyev and Garin did not play in the Championship Round.

As of matches played on 8 November 1992.

| Rank | Player | Club | Goals |
|---|---|---|---|
| 1 | (Russia) Yuri Matveyev | Uralmash | 20 |
| 2 | (Russia) Oleg Garin | Okean | 16 |
| 2 | (Azerbaijan) Vali Gasimov | Dynamo Moscow | 16 |
| 4 | (Russia) Vladimir Kulik | Zenit | 13 |
| 4 | (Russia) Kirill Rybakov | Asmaral | 13 |
| 6 | (Russia) Dmitri Radchenko | Spartak Moscow | 12 |
| 6 | (Azerbaijan) Nazim Suleymanov | Spartak Vladikavkaz | 12 |
| 8 | (Russia) Rustyam Fakhrutdinov | Krylia Sovetov | 10 |
| 8 | (Russia) Aleksandr Grishin | CSKA | 10 |
| 8 | (Russia) Gennadi Grishin | Torpedo | 10 |
| 8 | (Russia) Igor Lediakhov | Spartak Moscow | 10 |
| 8 | (Russia) Oleg Veretennikov | Rotor | 10 |

== Medal squads ==
(league appearances and goals listed in brackets)

1. FC Spartak Moscow

Goalkeepers: Stanislav Cherchesov (24), Gintaras Staučė (Lithuania) (3), Valeri Chizhov (1).
Defenders: Dmitri Khlestov (24), Viktor Onopko (23 / 6), Dmitri Popov (23 / 1), Andrei Chernyshov (22 / 3), Andrei Ivanov (22), Ramiz Mamedov (10 / 1), Kakhaber Tskhadadze (Georgia (country)) (7), Dmitri Ananko (2), Sergei Chudin (1), Aleksandr Shibayev (1).
Midfielders: Valery Karpin (26 / 7), Igor Lediakhov (24 / 10), Andrei Piatnitski (23 / 5), Rashid Rakhimov (Tajikistan) (11), Oleg Kuzhlev (5), Yevgeni Bushmanov (2), Vladimir Baksheyev (1), Aleksandr Karatayev (1), Alexei Kosolapov (1), Hennadiy Perepadenko (Ukraine) (1).
Forwards: Vladimir Beschastnykh (20 / 7), Dmitri Radchenko (18 / 12), Mikhail Rusyayev (15 / 6), Nikolai Pisarev (10 / 1), Aleksandr Tatarkin (9 / 1), Vali Gasimov (Azerbaijan) (6), Yuri Petrov (5 / 1), Andrey Tikhonov (2).

One own goal scored by Yuri Kovtun (FC Rostselmash Rostov-on-Don).

Manager: Oleg Romantsev.

Transferred out during the season: Rashid Rakhimov (Tajikistan) (to (Spain) Real Valladolid), Kakhaber Tskhadadze (Georgia (country)) , Vali Gasimov (Azerbaijan) (both to FC Dynamo Moscow), Yuri Petrov (to FC Lokomotiv Moscow), Yevgeni Bushmanov (to PFC CSKA Moscow), Aleksandr Shibayev, Alexei Kosolapov (both to FC Dynamo-Gazovik Tyumen), Hennadiy Perepadenko (Ukraine) (to (Spain) Badajoz).

2. FC Spartak Vladikavkaz

Goalkeepers: Zaur Khapov (26).
Defenders: Inal Dzhioyev (24 / 2), Gennadi Denisov (Uzbekistan) (23), Ali Alchagirov (22 / 1), Sergei Kozhanov (20), Artur Pagayev (17 / 1), Sergei Gazdanov (16 / 1), Sergei Bodak (7), Boris Dobashin (6), Andrei Sosnitskiy (Belarus) (1).
Midfielders: Mirjalol Qosimov (Uzbekistan) (25 / 3), Shamil Isayev (24 / 1), Marat Dzoblayev (23 / 3), Bakhva Tedeyev (20 / 8), Igor B. Kachmazov (20 / 1).
Forwards: Nazim Suleymanov (Azerbaijan) (26 / 12), Igor A. Kachmazov (19 / 7), Anri Bestayev (13 / 1), Igor Shkvyrin (Uzbekistan) (10 / 5), Stanislav Tskhovrebov (8), Grigori Ivanov (3), Ruslan Suanov (1), Georgi Takhokhov (Tajikistan) (1).

One own goal scored by Yevgeni Zarva (FC Dynamo-Gazovik Tyumen).

Manager: Aleksandr Novikov.

Transferred out during the season: Igor Shkvyrin (Uzbekistan) (to (Israel) Hapoel Tel Aviv F.C.), Grigori Ivanov (to FC Avtodor-Olaf Vladikavkaz), Peter Neustädter (Kazakhstan) (to (Germany) Karlsruher SC).

3. FC Dynamo Moscow

Goalkeepers: Valeri Kleymyonov (14), Andrei Smetanin (14).
Defenders: Igor Sklyarov (23 / 3), Vyacheslav Tsaryov (22 / 1), Igor Varlamov (13), Sergey Timofeev (Kazakhstan) (12 / 1), Yevgeni Dolgov (12), Sargis Hovhannisyan (Armenia) (12), Kakhaber Tskhadadze (Georgia (country)) (12), Viktor Losev (11), Aleksei Selezov (1).
Midfielders: Omari Tetradze (25 / 6), Yuriy Kalitvintsev (22 / 5), Sergei Derkach (21 / 3), Yevgeni Smertin (19 / 2), Andrey Kobelev (16 / 8), Yuri Alekseevich Drozdov (12), Vladimir Kostyuk (Turkmenistan) (11), Vitali But (7), Badri Spanderashvili (7), Igor Gavrilin (6), Aleksei Savchenko (4), Yegor Kiryakov (1).
Forwards: Igor Simutenkov (24 / 4), Vali Gasimov (Azerbaijan) (17 / 16), Sergei Kiriakov (8 / 1), Viktor Leonenko (4 / 5), Platon Krivoshchyokov (4), Nikolai Kovardayev (2).

Manager: Valery Gazzaev.

Transferred out during the season: Viktor Losev (retired), Sergei Kiriakov (to (Germany) Karlsruher SC), Viktor Leonenko (to (Ukraine) FC Dynamo Kyiv).

== See also ==
- 1992 Russian First League
- 1992 Russian Second League
