= 1992 in Russian football =

1992 season

1992 was the first season Russia held its own national football competition since the breakup of the Soviet Union.

== Club competitions ==
The teams participating came mostly from the Soviet Union leagues. New Top League had 20 teams, second-level First League had 3 zones and 52 teams in total and third-level Second League had 6 zones with 115 teams. FC Spartak Moscow won the championship.

For more details, see:

- 1992 Russian Top League
- 1992 Russian First League
- 1992 Russian Second League

== Cup competitions ==
The last, 1991/92 edition of the Soviet Cup was won by FC Spartak Moscow who beat PFC CSKA Moscow in the final game 2–0 on 10 May 1992. Ukrainian teams who were scheduled to play in the quarterfinals, FC Dynamo Kyiv, FC Metalist Kharkiv and FC Chornomorets Odesa all withdrew, giving Spartak, CSKA and FC Pamir Dushanbe spots in the semifinals.

The early stages of the 1992–93 Russian Cup were played later in the year.

== European club competitions ==
All the Russian teams participating in the 1991–92 seasons of their respective competitions were eliminated in 1991.

The Russian league was not finished by the time of the 1992–93 season, therefore the Russian teams qualified for that season based on the Soviet Top League 1991 results.

=== 1992–93 UEFA Champions League ===
PFC CSKA Moscow, surprisingly, qualified for the group stage, unexpectedly knocking out FC Barcelona in the qualification round. They came last in their group though, only gaining 2 points in 6 games. They could not play their home games in Moscow due to the lack of a stadium meeting the Champions League standards at the time.

- 16 September 1992 / first round, first leg / Víkingur (Iceland) – PFC CSKA Moscow 0–1 (Karsakov 76') / Reykjavík, Laugardalsvöllur / attendance: 2,000

PFC CSKA Moscow: Kharine, Guschin (Bavykin, 70), Kolotovkin, Bystrov, Fokin (captain), Ivanov, Mashkarin, Grishin, Sergeyev, Bushmanov (Karsakov, 57), Faizulin.

- 30 September 1992 / first round, return leg / PFC CSKA Moscow – Víkingur 4–2 (Sergeyev 22' Karsakov 36' Grishin 45' Kolesnikov 89' – Einarrson 32' Steinsson 78') / Moscow, Luzhniki Stadium / attendance: 10,000

PFC CSKA Moscow: Kharine, Guschin (Mashkarin, 69), Malyukov, Bystrov, Fokin (captain), Ivanov, Minko, Grishin, Sergeyev, Karsakov, Faizulin (Kolesnikov, 61).

- 21 October 1992 / second round, first leg / PFC CSKA Moscow – FC Barcelona (Spain) 1–1 (Grishin 17' – Txiki Begiristain 58') / Moscow, Luzhniki Stadium / attendance: 40,000

PFC CSKA Moscow: Kharine, Guschin, Kolotovkin, Bystrov, Fokin (captain), Ivanov, Mashkarin (Bushmanov, 68), Grishin, Sergeyev, Karsakov (Faizulin, 63), Minko.

- 4 November 1992 / second round, return leg / FC Barcelona – PFC CSKA Moscow 2–3 (Nadal 12' Txiki Begiristain 31' – Bushmanov 44' Mashkarin 57' Karsakov 61') / Barcelona, Camp Nou / attendance: 80,000

PFC CSKA Moscow: Kharine, Guschin, Kolotovkin, Malyukov, Fokin, Kolesnikov (captain) (Ivanov, 75), Mashkarin, Grishin (Karsakov, 38), Sergeyev, Bushmanov, Faizulin.

- 25 November 1992 / Group A, Day 1 / Club Brugge (Belgium) – PFC CSKA Moscow 1–0 (Amokachi 17') / Bruges, Olympiastadion / attendance: 24,000

PFC CSKA Moscow: Kharine (Guteyev, 46), Guschin, Kolotovkin, Bystrov, Malyukov, Kolesnikov (captain), Mashkarin, Grishin (Karsakov, 30), Sergeyev, Bushmanov, Faizulin.

- 4 December 1992 / Group A, Day 2 / PFC CSKA Moscow – Rangers (Scotland) 0–1 (Ferguson 13') / Bochum, Germany, Ruhrstadion / attendance: 16,000

PFC CSKA Moscow: Guteyev, Guschin (Ivanov, 68), Kolotovkin, Bystrov, Fokin (captain), Malyukov, Valeri Minko (Grishin, 61), Karsakov, Sergeyev, Bushmanov, Faizulin.

=== 1992–93 European Cup Winners' Cup ===
Despite stumbling in the first game against the low-rated FC Avenir Beggen, FC Spartak Moscow had quite a successful run, eventually reaching the semifinals.

- 16 September 1992 / first round, first leg / FC Spartak Moscow – FC Avenir Beggen (Luxembourg) 0–0 / Moscow, Luzhniki Stadium / attendance: 12,500

FC Spartak Moscow: Cherchesov (captain), Khlestov, Ivanov (Beschastnykh, 50), Rusyayev, Chernyshov, Onopko, Karpin, Piatnitski, Lediakhov, Radchenko.

- 30 September 1992 / first round, return leg / FC Avenir Beggen – FC Spartak Moscow 1–5 (Nowak 85' – Onopko 5' Piatnitski 8' 78' Radchenko 55' Popov 58') / Beggen, Stade rue Henri Dunant / attendance: 1,604.

FC Spartak Moscow: Cherchesov (captain), Khlestov, Ivanov (Kuzhlev, 74), Popov, Rusyayev (Beschastnykh, 26), Chernyshov, Onopko, Karpin, Piatnitski, Lediakhov, Radchenko.

- 22 October 1992 / second round, first leg / FC Spartak Moscow – Liverpool F.C. (England) 4–2 (Pisarev 10' Karpin 67' 85' (pen.) Piatnitski 89' – Wright 66' McManaman 79' Grobbelaar (red card) 82') / Moscow, Luzhniki Stadium / attendance: 60,000

FC Spartak Moscow: Cherchesov (captain), Khlestov, Ivanov, Pisarev, Beschastnykh (Rusyayev, 53), Chernyshov, Onopko, Karpin, Piatnitski, Lediakhov, Radchenko.

- 4 November 1992 / second round, return leg / Liverpool F.C. – FC Spartak Moscow 0–2 (Radchenko 63' Piatnitski 89' – Marsh (red card) 87') / Liverpool, Anfield / attendance: 38,000

FC Spartak Moscow: Cherchesov (captain), Khlestov, Ivanov, Pisarev (Rusyayev, 64), Beschastnykh, Chernyshov, Onopko, Karpin, Piatnitski, Lediakhov (Baksheyev, 85), Radchenko.

=== 1992–93 UEFA Cup ===
Both FC Dynamo Moscow and FC Torpedo Moscow had impressive wins, beating Torino F.C. and Manchester United F.C. respectively, before being eliminated.

- 16 September 1992 / first round, first leg / FC Dynamo Moscow – Rosenborg BK (Norway) 5–1 (Sklyarov 34' 62' Timofeev 46' Simutenkov 57' Tetradze 68' – Løken 75') / Moscow, Dynamo Stadium / attendance: 6,500

FC Dynamo Moscow: Kleimyonov, Timofeev, Sklyarov (captain), Tskhadadze, Kalitvintsev (Spanderashvili, 88), Hovhannisyan, Smertin (Drozdov, 71), Tsaryov, Tetradze, Gasimov, Simutenkov.

- 16 September 1992 / first round, first leg / Manchester United F.C. (England) – FC Torpedo Moscow 0–0 / Manchester, Old Trafford / attendance: 20,000

FC Torpedo Moscow: Podshivalov (captain), Filimonov, Cheltsov, Afanasyev, Vostrosablin, Shustikov (Skachenko, 80), Grishin, Martynov, Talalayev (Ulyanov, 75), Chugainov, Arefyev.

- 29 September 1992 / first round, return leg / FC Torpedo Moscow – Manchester United F.C. 0–0; 4–3 in shootout (Chugainov (penalty scored) Grishin (penalty scored) Ulyanov (penalty scored) Arefyev (penalty scored) Afanasyev (penalty missed) Borisov (penalty missed) – Ince (penalty scored) Irwin (penalty scored) Robson (penalty scored) Pallister (penalty missed) McClair (penalty missed) Bruce (penalty missed) ) / Moscow, Torpedo Stadium / attendance: 11,350

FC Torpedo Moscow: Podshivalov (captain), Filimonov, Cheltsov, Afanasyev, Vostrosablin (Borisov, 100), Shustikov, Grishin, Talalayev, Arefyev, Chugainov, Pazemov (Ulyanov, 84).

- 30 September 1992 / first round, return leg / Rosenborg BK – FC Dynamo Moscow 2–0 (Ingebrigtsen 8' Løken 48') / Trondheim, Lerkendal stadion / attendance: 10,218

FC Dynamo Moscow: Kleimyonov, Tsaryov, Sklyarov, Tskhadadze, Kalitvintsev, Kobelev (captain), Smertin, Derkach, Hovhannisyan, Gasimov (Spanderashvili, 88), Simutenkov (Drozdov, 70).

- 21 October 1992 / second round, first leg / Real Madrid C.F. (Spain) – FC Torpedo Moscow 5–2 (Hierro 8' 28' 32' Zamorano 52' Prosinečki 85' (pen.) – Shustikov 36' Grishin 39') / Madrid, Santiago Bernabéu Stadium / attendance: 50,000

FC Torpedo Moscow: Podshivalov (captain), Filimonov, Cheltsov, Afanasyev, Ulyanov, Shustikov, Grishin, Tishkov, Vostrosablin (Savichev, 46), Chugainov, Arefyev.

- 22 October 1992 / second round, first leg / Torino F.C. (Italy) – FC Dynamo Moscow 1–2 (Timofeev 53' (o.g.) – Gasimov 44' Simutenkov 66') / Turin, Stadio delle Alpi / attendance: 26,943

FC Dynamo Moscow: Kleimyonov, Timofeev, Sklyarov (Varlamov, 84), Tskhadadze, Tsaryov, Kobelev (captain), Smertin, Derkach, Tetradze, Gasimov (Hovhannisyan, 88), Simutenkov.

- 4 November 1992 / second round, return leg / FC Torpedo Moscow – Real Madrid C.F. 3–2 (Talalayev 12' Tishkov 62' Murashov 77' – Zamorano 9' Hierro 56' Sanchís (red card) 86') / Moscow, Torpedo Stadium / attendance: 6,500

FC Torpedo Moscow: Podshivalov (captain), Filimonov, Cheltsov, Afanasyev, Murashov, Shustikov, Grishin, Tishkov, Talalayev (Pazemov, 80), Chugainov, Arefyev (Ulyanov, 73).

- 5 November 1992 / second round, return leg / FC Dynamo Moscow – Torino F.C. 0–0 (Simutenkov (red card) 55' – Annoni (red card) 90') / Moscow, Dynamo Stadium / attendance: 13,000

FC Dynamo Moscow: Kleimyonov, Timofeev, Sklyarov, Tskhadadze, Kalitvintsev (Tsaryov, 66), Kobelev (captain), Varlamov, Derkach, Tetradze, Gasimov (Hovhannisyan, 87), Simutenkov.

- 25 November 1992 / third round, first leg / FC Dynamo Moscow – S.L. Benfica (Portugal) 2–2 (Kalitvintsev 75' Derkach 88' – Isaías 35' 54') / Moscow, Torpedo Stadium / attendance: 8,700

FC Dynamo Moscow: Kleimyonov, Hovhannisyan (Kovardayev, 55), Sklyarov, Tskhadadze, Kalitvintsev, Kobelev (captain), Smertin (Savchenko, 84), Derkach, Tetradze, Gasimov, Varlamov.

- 8 December 1992 / third round, return leg / S.L. Benfica – FC Dynamo Moscow 2–0 (Isaías 53' Yuran 58') / Lisbon, Estádio da Luz / attendance: 67,000

FC Dynamo Moscow: Kleimyonov, Timofeev, Sklyarov, Tskhadadze, Kalitvintsev, Kobelev (captain) (Varlamov, 69), Smertin (Savchenko, 75), Derkach, Tetradze, Gasimov, Tsaryov.

== National team ==
Soviet Union has qualified for the UEFA Euro 1992. Because the country was dissolved by the time of the competition, a unified team called CIS national football team participated in that tournament. That team played 10 games, with many players representing Russia.

On 16 August 1992, the Russia national football team played its first game in a friendly against Mexico. The head coach was Pavel Sadyrin.

=== Matches ===
- 16 August 1992 / friendly / Russia – Mexico 2–0 (Karpin 61' (pen.) Popov 66') / Moscow, Lokomotiv Stadium / attendance: 15,000

Russia: Cherchesov (captain), Khlestov, Kulkov (Beschastnykh, 63), Popov, Kolotovkin (Chernyshov, 85), Onopko, Tetradze (Podpaly, 85), Karpin, Lediakhov (Kobelev, 46; Ivanov, 76), Matveyev (Lemish, 80), Radchenko.

- 14 October 1992 / 1994 FIFA World Cup qualifier / Russia – Iceland 1–0 (Yuran 65') / Moscow, Luzhniki Stadium / attendance: 25,000

Russia: Cherchesov (captain), Khlestov, Kulkov, Onopko, Kolotovkin, Shalimov, Dobrovolski, Karpin, Lediakhov (Tatarchuk, 46), Yuran (Kolyvanov, 77), Kiriakov.

- 28 October 1992 / 1994 FIFA World Cup qualifier / Russia – Luxembourg 2–0 (Yuran 5' Radchenko 24') / Moscow, Luzhniki Stadium / attendance: 3,000

Russia: Cherchesov (captain), Khlestov, Kulkov, Onopko, Mostovoi, Shalimov, Dobrovolski, Karpin, Radchenko (Tatarchuk, 79), Yuran, Kiriakov (Borodyuk, 60).
