= 1994 Russian Top League =

3rd season of top-tier football league in Russia

Russian Top League
- Season: 1994

Statistics of Russian Top League in the 1994 season.

== Overview ==
Locations of teams in the 1994 Top League

16 teams participated, and FC Spartak Moscow won the championship.

Team	Head coach
FC Spartak Moscow	Oleg Romantsev
FC Dynamo Moscow	Konstantin Beskov
FC Lokomotiv Moscow	Yuri Syomin
FC Rotor Volgograd	Vladimir Salkov (until May); Viktor Prokopenko (from July)
FC Spartak Vladikavkaz	Valery Gazzaev
FC KAMAZ Naberezhnye Chelny	Valeri Chetverik
FC Tekstilshchik Kamyshin	Sergei Pavlov
FC Lokomotiv Nizhny Novgorod	Valeri Ovchinnikov
FC Zhemchuzhina Sochi	Arsen Naydyonov
PFC CSKA Moscow	Boris Kopeikin (until May); Aleksandr Tarkhanov (from June)
FC Torpedo Moscow	Yury Mironov (until July); Sergei Petrenko (caretaker, July to August); Valentin Ivanov (from August)
FC Dynamo-Gazovik Tyumen	Eduard Malofeyev
FC Krylia Sovetov Samara	Valeri Bogdanov (until April); Anatoli Kikin (caretaker, April to May); Aleksandr Averyanov (from May)
FC Uralmash Yekaterinburg	Viktor Shishkin (until August); Vladimir Kalashnikov (from September)
FC Dynamo Stavropol	Sergei Zimenkov (until July); Vladimir Yulygin (caretaker, July to August); Boris Stukalov (from August)
FC Lada Togliatti	Aleksandr Irkhin (until March); Aleksandr Garmashov (caretaker, March to June); Viktor Tishchenko (from July)

== League standings ==
Pos	Team	Pld	W	D	L	GF	GA	GD	Pts	Qualification or relegation
1	Spartak Moscow (C)	30	21	8	1	73	21	+52	50	Qualification to Champions League group stage
2	Dynamo Moscow	30	13	13	4	55	35	+20	39	Qualification to Cup Winners' Cup first round
3	Lokomotiv Moscow	30	12	12	6	49	28	+21	36	Qualification to UEFA Cup first round
4	Rotor Volgograd	30	10	16	4	39	23	+16	36	Qualification to UEFA Cup first round
5	Spartak Vladikavkaz	30	11	11	8	32	34	−2	33	Qualification to UEFA Cup first round
6	KAMAZ Naberezhnye Chelny	30	11	9	10	38	38	0	31	
7	Tekstilshchik Kamyshin	30	12	6	12	32	36	−4	30	
8	Lokomotiv N.N.	30	11	8	11	34	34	0	30	
9	Zhemchuzhina Sochi (Note: FC Zhemchuzhina Sochi was called FC Zhemchuzhina-Kuban Sochi for part of the season.)	30	8	11	11	44	48	−4	27	
10	CSKA Moscow	30	8	10	12	30	32	−2	26	
11	Torpedo Moscow	30	7	12	11	28	37	−9	26	
12	Dynamo-Gazovik Tyumen	30	7	10	13	24	49	−25	24	
13	Krylia Sovetov Samara	30	6	12	12	30	51	−21	24	
14	Uralmash Yekaterinburg	30	7	9	14	33	49	−16	23	
15	Dynamo Stavropol (R)	30	6	11	13	25	34	−9	23	Relegation to First League
16	Lada-Togliatti (R)	30	6	10	14	24	41	−17	22	Relegation to First League

Source: rsssf.com
Rules for classification: 1) points; 2) goal difference; 3) number of goals scored.
(C) Champions; (R) Relegated

== Results ==
Home \ Away	CSK	DYN	DST	DGT	KAM	KRY	LAD	LOK	LNN	ROT	SPA	SPV	TEK	TOR	URA	ZHE
CSKA Moscow		2–3	3–1	4–0	1–0	1–1	0–0	1–2	1–1	0–0	1–1	2–0	1–0	0–0	2–1	1–1
Dynamo Moscow	2–4		1–1	5–2	2–1	3–0	1–0	2–2	3–4	0–1	0–0	1–1	1–0	2–0	6–0	5–3
Dynamo Stavropol	0–0	1–0		0–1	1–1	5–0	1–0	0–1	0–2	0–0	1–2	2–3	0–0	0–0	4–1	2–1
Dynamo-Gazovik Tyumen	0–1	2–2	1–1		0–0	1–0	0–0	3–2	1–0	2–2	0–0	0–0	3–1	0–0	1–0	0–2
KAMAZ Naberezhnye Chelny	1–1	2–2	1–0	4–0		3–1	1–0	0–0	2–0	1–0	1–3	6–0	1–0	1–1	0–0	4–2
Krylia Sovetov Samara	1–1	1–1	1–1	2–0	1–1		0–0	1–1	0–3	3–1	2–6	1–0	4–0	1–1	3–2	2–1
Lada-Togliatti	1–0	2–3	0–1	1–1	2–4	2–1		0–0	1–0	0–0	1–5	1–2	3–2	2–1	1–1	1–3
Lokomotiv Moscow	1–0	0–2	0–0	7–0	3–0	2–1	2–1		1–1	1–1	1–1	1–0	2–0	8–0	0–1	2–0
Lokomotiv N.N.	2–0	1–2	1–1	2–0	2–0	0–0	0–0	1–0		0–0	0–4	1–0	0–0	2–1	1–0	1–1
Rotor Volgograd	2–1	1–1	1–1	2–0	4–0	5–0	4–1	1–0	2–3		1–1	1–1	3–1	2–1	1–1	2–1
Spartak Moscow	2–0	1–1	2–1	2–0	1–0	5–0	3–0	3–1	3–0	0–0		2–1	4–1	1–0	4–0	5–2
Spartak Vladikavkaz	2–1	1–1	1–0	2–1	4–1	0–0	1–2	1–1	2–1	1–0	1–0		2–1	0–0	2–1	0–0
Tekstilshchik Kamyshin	2–1	1–1	2–0	2–0	3–0	1–0	1–0	1–1	1–0	0–0	0–1	2–0		1–0	1–0	2–1
Torpedo Moscow	1–0	0–1	3–0	2–1	3–0	1–1	1–1	1–1	2–1	1–1	2–2	2–2	1–2		1–0	1–0
Uralmash Yekaterinburg	2–0	1–1	4–0	1–2	0–1	1–0	2–1	4–4	3–2	0–0	2–6	1–1	1–1	1–0		1–1
Zhemchuzhina Sochi	2–0	0–0	1–0	2–2	1–1	2–2	0–0	1–2	3–2	1–1	1–3	1–1	5–3	3–1	2–1	

Legend: Blue = home team win; Yellow = draw; Red = away team win.

== Season statistics ==
=== Top goalscorers ===
As of matches played on 6 November 1994.

Rank	Player	Club	Goals
1	(Russia) Igor Simutenkov	Dynamo Moscow	21
2	(Russia) Oleg Garin	Lokomotiv Moscow	20
3	(Russia) Oleg Veretennikov	Rotor	12
4	(Russia) Vladimir Beschastnykh	Spartak Moscow	10
5	(Russia) Vladimir Filimonov	Zhemchuzhina	9
5	(Russia) Yuri Matveyev	Uralmash	9
5	(Kazakhstan) (Russia) Vladimir Niederhaus	Rotor	9
5	(Russia) Andrei Tikhonov	Spartak Moscow	9
9	(Russia) Andrei Afanasyev	Torpedo	8
9	(Russia) Timur Bogatyryov	Zhemchuzhina	8
9	(Russia) Dmitri Cheryshev	Dynamo Moscow	8
9	(Russia) Yuri Kalitvintsev	Lokomotiv N.N.	8
9	(Russia) Aleksandr Smirnov	Dynamo Moscow	8

== Medal squads ==
1. FC Spartak Moscow

Goalkeepers: Gintaras Staučė (Lithuania) (16), Dmytro Tyapushkin (Ukraine) (14), Valeri Chizhov (1).
Defenders: Yuriy Nikiforov (26 / 2), Viktor Onopko (26 / 2), Ramiz Mamedov (22 / 1), Vladislav Ternavski (20 / 1), Dmitri Khlestov (17), Sergei Chudin (6 / 1), Dmitri Ananko (6), Andrei Ivanov (2), Yuriy Sak (Ukraine) (2), Aleksandr Lipko (1).
Midfielders: Ilya Tsymbalar (27 / 6), Andrei Piatnitski (25 / 6), Dmitri Alenichev (17 / 3), Rashid Rakhimov (15 / 1), Valery Karpin (12 / 5), Igor Lediakhov (12 / 5), Oleh Naduda (Ukraine) (11 / 1), Valery Kechinov (9 / 3), Serhiy Pohodin (Ukraine) (1).
Forwards: Andrey Tikhonov (20 / 9), Nikolai Pisarev (19 / 5), Mukhsin Mukhamadiev (15 / 6), Vladimir Beschastnykh (13 / 10), Sergey Rodionov (7 / 2), Valeri Masalitin (6 / 5), Andrei Konovalov (3).
(league appearances and goals listed in brackets)

Manager: Oleg Romantsev.

Transferred out during the season: Gintaras Staučė (Lithuania) (to (Turkey) Galatasaray S.K.), Vladimir Beschastnykh (to (Germany) SV Werder Bremen), Valery Karpin (to (Spain) Real Sociedad), Igor Lediakhov (to (Spain) Sporting Gijón), Andrei Ivanov (to FC Dynamo Moscow), Yuriy Sak (Ukraine) (to (Ukraine) FC Chornomorets Odesa), Serhiy Pohodin (Ukraine) (to (Ukraine) FC Shakhtar Donetsk).

2. FC Dynamo Moscow

Goalkeepers: Andrei Smetanin (29), Valeri Kleymyonov (3), Dmitriy Kramarenko (Azerbaijan) (3).
Defenders: Andrei Chernyshov (24 / 1), Yuri Kovtun (22 / 2), Sergei Shulgin (20), Andrei Ivanov (16 / 1), Vagiz Khidiyatullin (15 / 1), Sergey Timofeev (Kazakhstan) (10), Aleksandr Borodkin (6), Yevgeni Smertin (4).
Midfielders: Sergei Nekrasov (29 / 5), Denis Klyuyev (28 / 1), Oleg Samatov (25 / 1), Omari Tetradze (23 / 1), Aleksandr Smirnov (22 / 8), Igor Dobrovolski (13 / 3), Erik Yakhimovich (Belarus) (11), Sergei Derkach (5), Aleksei Filippov (3).
Forwards: Igor Simutenkov (28 / 21), Dmitri Cheryshev (24 / 8), Aleksei Kutsenko (6 / 1), Kirill Rybakov (2), Yuri Tishkov (2), Igor Nekrasov (1).

One own goal scored by Vladimir Shcherbak (FC Krylia Sovetov Samara).

Manager: Konstantin Beskov.

Transferred out during the season: Igor Simutenkov (to (Italy) Reggiana), Igor Dobrovolski (to (Spain) Atlético Madrid), Yevgeni Smertin (to FC Lokomotiv Nizhny Novgorod), Valeri Kleymyonov (to (Israel) Maccabi Herzliya F.C.).

3. FC Lokomotiv Moscow

Goalkeepers: Sergei Ovchinnikov (28), Khasanbi Bidzhiyev (3).
Defenders: Aleksei Arifullin (27), Sargis Hovhannisyan (Armenia) (26 / 3), Igor Chugainov (22 / 2), Oleg Pashinin (Uzbekistan) (11), Sergei Podpaly (11), Rashid Rakhimov (11), Vladimir Leonchenko (9), Khakim Fuzailov (Tajikistan) (8), Andrei Mulikov (2).
Midfielders: Alexei Kosolapov (29 / 5), Oleg Elyshev (26 / 3), Yuri Alekseevich Drozdov (21 / 2), Yevgeni Kharlachyov (20 / 3), Ansar Ayupov (19), Vladimir Maminov (Uzbekistan) (11 / 1), Yuri Baturenko (Tajikistan) (10), Dmitri Gorkov (2 / 1).
Forwards: Oleg Garin (30 / 20), Aleksandr Tatarkin (21 / 5), Aleksandr Katasonov (21 / 2), Serhiy Perepadenko (Ukraine) (10 / 1), Vitali Nikulkin (3), Yuri Petrov (1).

One own goal scored by Gennadi Filimonov (FC Torpedo Moscow).

Manager: Yuri Syomin.

Transferred out during the season: Sergei Podpaly (to (Israel) Hapoel Haifa F.C.), Rashid Rakhimov (to FC Spartak Moscow), Vitali Nikulkin (to FC Lokomotiv Nizhny Novgorod).

== Attendances ==
Rank	Club	Average
1	Spartak Vladikavkaz	17,800
2	Rotor	11,747
3	KAMAZ	11,547
4	Krylia Sovetov	7,600
5	Tekstilshchik	7,087
6	Uralmash	6,580
7	Stavropol	5,987
8	Nizhny Novgorod	5,773
9	Tyumen	5,353
10	Spartak Moscow	4,210
11	Zhemchuzhina	4,147
12	Lada	3,967
13	Dynamo Moscow	2,882
14	PFC CSKA	2,877
15	Torpedo Moscow	2,403
16	Lokomotiv Moscow	1,933
