= 2004 Russian Premier League =

13th season of top-tier football league in Russia

Russian Premier League
- Season: 2004
- Champions: Lokomotiv Moscow; 2nd title
- Relegated: Kuban Krasnodar; Rotor Volgograd
- Champions League: Lokomotiv Moscow; CSKA Moscow
- UEFA Cup: Krylia Sovetov; Zenit St.Petersburg
- Matches: 240
- Goals: 598 (2.49 per match)
- Top goalscorer: Aleksandr Kerzhakov (18)

Following are the results of the 2004 Russian Premier League, the top division of Russian association football. Lokomotiv won their second Premier League title, while Krylya Sovetov finished in the top three for the first time, winning bronze. Kuban were relegated after just one season in the Premier League. They were joined by Rotor who played at the top level since the beginning of the Russian league.

== Teams ==
As in the previous season, 16 teams are playing in the 2004 season. After the 2003 season, Chernomorets Novorossiysk and Uralan Elista were relegated to the 2004 Russian First Division. They were replaced by Amkar Perm and Kuban Krasnodar, the winners and runners up of the 2003 Russian First Division.

=== Venues ===
Alania	Amkar	CSKA	Dynamo
Republican Spartak Stadium	Zvezda Stadium	Central Stadium	Central Stadium
Capacity: 32,464	Capacity: 17,000	Capacity: 36,540	Capacity: 36,540
Krylia Sovetov Samara	Locations of teams in 2004 Russian Premier League		Kuban Krasnodar
Metallurg Stadium	Locations of teams in 2004 Russian Premier League		Kuban Stadium
Capacity: 27,084	Locations of teams in 2004 Russian Premier League		Capacity: 28,800
Lokomotiv Moscow	Locations of teams in 2004 Russian Premier League		Moscow
RZD Arena	Locations of teams in 2004 Russian Premier League		Eduard Streltsov Stadium
Capacity: 33,001	Locations of teams in 2004 Russian Premier League		Capacity: 13,450
Rostov	Locations of teams in 2004 Russian Premier League		Rotor
Olimp-2	Locations of teams in 2004 Russian Premier League		Central Stadium
Capacity: 15,840	Locations of teams in 2004 Russian Premier League		Capacity: 32,120
Rubin	Locations of teams in 2004 Russian Premier League		Saturn
Central Stadium	Locations of teams in 2004 Russian Premier League		Saturn Stadium
Capacity: 22,500	Locations of teams in 2004 Russian Premier League		Capacity: 14,685
Shinnik	Spartak	Torpedo	Zenit Saint Petersburg
Shinnik Stadium	Luzhniki Stadium	Luzhniki Stadium	Petrovsky Stadium
Capacity: 22,871	Capacity: 81,029	Capacity: 81,029	Capacity: 21,570

=== Personnel and kits ===
Team	Location	Head coach	Captain	Kit manufacturer	Shirt sponsor
Alania	Vladikavkaz	(Russia) Yuri Sekinayev (Caretaker)			
Amkar Perm	Perm	(Russia) Sergei Oborin			
CSKA	Moscow	(Russia) Valery Gazzaev		Umbro	Sibneft
Dynamo	Moscow	(Russia) Oleg Romantsev		Diadora	
Lokomotiv	Moscow	(Russia) Yuri Semin		Nike	
Krylia	Samara	(Russia) Gadzhi Gadzhiyev			
Kuban	Krasnodar	(Russia) Leonid Nazarenko (Caretaker)		Umbro	
Moscow	Moscow	(Russia) Valery Petrakov			
Rostov	Rostov-on-Don	(Russia) Sergei Balakhnin		Umbro	—N/a
Rotor	Volgograd	(Russia) Vladimir Fayzulin		Umbro	Rotor
Rubin	Kazan	(Turkmenistan) Kurban Berdyev		Nike	—N/a
Saturn	Ramenskoye	(Russia) Aleksandr Tarkhanov			
Shinnik	Yaroslavl	(Russia) Oleg Dolmatov			
Spartak	Moscow	(Latvia) Aleksandrs Starkovs		Umbro	
Torpedo	Moscow	(Russia) Sergei Petrenko		Le Coq Sportif	
Zenit	Saint Petersburg	(Czech Republic) Vlastimil Petržela		Umbro	Gazprom

=== Managerial changes ===
Team	Outgoing manager	Manner of departure	Date of vacancy	Position in table	Replaced by	Date of appointment	Position in table
Alania	(Russia) Bakhva Tedeyev			Preseason	(France) Rolland Courbis	9 January 2004	Preseason
CSKA	(Russia) Valery Gazzaev			Preseason	(Portugal) Artur Jorge	23 November 2003	Preseason
Dynamo	(Ukraine) Viktor Prokopenko			Preseason	(Czech Republic) Jaroslav Hřebík	8 November 2003	Preseason
Krylia	(Russia) Aleksandr Tarkhanov			Preseason	(Russia) Gadzhi Gadzhiyev		Preseason
Rostov	(Russia) Sergei Balakhnin			Preseason	(Russia) Vitaly Shevchenko		Preseason
Saturn	(Russia) Oleg Romantsev			Preseason	(Russia) Boris Ignatyev		Preseason
Spartak	(Russia) Vladimir Fedotov (Caretaker)	End of role		Preseason	(Italy) Nevio Scala	December 2003	Preseason
Rostov	(Russia) Vitaly Shevchenko		April 2004		(Russia) Sergei Balakhnin	April 2004	
Rotor	(Russia) Vladimir Fayzulin		April 2004		(Russia) Yuri Marushkin (Caretaker)	April 2004	
Rotor	(Russia) Yuri Marushkin (Caretaker)		April 2004		(Ukraine) Valeriy Yaremchenko	April 2004	
Kuban	(Russia) Nikolai Yuzhanin		May 2004		(Russia) Soferbi Yeshugov	May 2004	
Shinnik	(Russia) Aleksandr Pobegalov		May 2004		(Russia) Valeri Frolov (Caretaker)	May 2004	
Shinnik	(Russia) Valeri Frolov (Caretaker)	End of role	May 2004		(Russia) Oleg Dolmatov	May 2004	
Rotor	(Ukraine) Valeriy Yaremchenko		June 2004		(Russia) Yuri Marushkin (Caretaker)	June 2004	
Dynamo	(Czech Republic) Jaroslav Hřebík	Resigned	12 July 2004	14th	(Russia) Viktor Bondarenko (Caretaker)	12 July 2004	14th
CSKA	(Portugal) Artur Jorge	Fired	13 July 2004	5th	(Russia) Valery Gazzaev	14 July 2004	5th
Rotor	(Russia) Yuri Marushkin (Caretaker)		July 2004		(Russia) Vladimir Fayzulin	July 2004	
Spartak	(Italy) Nevio Scala		August 2004		(Latvia) Aleksandrs Starkovs	September 2004	
Saturn	(Russia) Boris Ignatyev		September 2004		(Russia) Aleksandr Tarkhanov	September 2004	
Alania	(France) Rolland Courbis		September 2004		(Serbia) Dragan Cvetković (Caretaker)	September 2004	
Alania	(Serbia) Dragan Cvetković (Caretaker)	Resigned	7 October 2004	12th	(Russia) Yuri Sekinayev (Caretaker)	7 October 2004	12th
Dynamo	(Russia) Viktor Bondarenko (Caretaker)	Resigned	26 October 2004	14th	(Russia) Oleg Romantsev	26 October 2004	14th
Kuban	(Russia) Soferbi Yeshugov		October 2004		(Russia) Leonid Nazarenko (Caretaker)	October 2004	

== Standings ==
Pos	Team	Pld	W	D	L	GF	GA	GD	Pts	Qualification or relegation
1	Lokomotiv Moscow (C)	30	18	7	5	44	19	+25	61	Qualification to Champions League second qualifying round
2	CSKA Moscow	30	17	9	4	53	22	+31	60	Qualification to UEFA Cup first round
3	Krylia Sovetov Samara	30	17	5	8	50	41	+9	56	Qualification to UEFA Cup second qualifying round
4	Zenit St. Petersburg	30	17	5	8	55	37	+18	56	Qualification to UEFA Cup second qualifying round
5	Torpedo Moscow	30	16	6	8	53	37	+16	54	
6	Shinnik Yaroslavl	30	12	8	10	29	29	0	44	
7	Saturn	30	10	11	9	37	30	+7	41	
8	Spartak Moscow	30	11	7	12	43	44	−1	40	
9	FC Moscow	30	10	10	10	38	39	−1	40	
10	Rubin Kazan	30	7	12	11	32	31	+1	33	
11	Amkar Perm	30	6	12	12	27	42	−15	30	
12	Rostov	30	7	8	15	28	42	−14	29	
13	Dynamo Moscow	30	6	11	13	27	38	−11	29	
14	Alania Vladikavkaz	30	7	7	16	28	52	−24	28	
15	Kuban Krasnodar (R)	30	6	10	14	26	42	−16	28	Relegation to First Division
16	Rotor Volgograd (R)	30	4	10	16	28	53	−25	22	Relegation to First Division

Source: RSSSF
Rules for classification: 1st points; 2nd matches won; 3rd head-to-head (points, matches won, goal difference, goals scored, away goals scored); 4th goal difference
(C) Champions; (R) Relegated

== Results ==
Home \ Away	ALA	AMK	CSK	DYN	KRY	KUB	LOK	MOS	ROS	ROT	RUB	SAT	SHI	SPA	TOR	ZEN
Alania Vladikavkaz		1–2	1–4	4–2	1–4	2–0	1–2	1–0	0–0	1–1	0–0	0–3	2–1	0–2	0–0	0–3
Amkar Perm	1–0		0–0	0–1	3–1	1–2	0–1	1–0	2–0	1–1	2–2	1–1	1–1	0–2	2–1	0–2
CSKA Moscow	1–0	3–0		0–0	1–1	3–1	0–1	0–0	2–0	3–0	1–0	2–0	1–1	2–1	3–3	3–3
Dynamo Moscow	1–0	3–1	1–1		1–1	0–1	2–4	1–0	0–1	5–0	0–0	0–2	1–0	1–1	1–1	0–2
Krylia Sovetov Samara	4–2	1–0	1–1	4–1		2–1	1–0	2–1	2–1	1–0	2–1	1–1	1–2	4–2	2–5	0–1
Kuban Krasnodar	2–3	0–0	0–3	0–0	1–1		2–1	0–0	3–1	1–1	1–0	0–0	1–0	1–2	1–2	1–3
Lokomotiv Moscow	3–0	0–0	1–0	2–1	1–0	3–0		0–1	1–1	0–1	0–0	2–0	3–0	0–0	3–1	0–1
FC Moscow	0–0	3–1	1–4	1–0	5–1	2–2	1–2		2–2	1–0	1–0	2–1	3–2	2–3	0–2	1–1
Rostov	0–0	0–0	1–3	2–0	0–1	1–1	1–2	1–2		4–1	1–0	1–2	0–0	3–1	0–4	2–1
Rotor Volgograd	0–1	2–2	1–3	0–0	3–2	1–1	2–2	1–1	3–2		0–1	1–0	0–2	2–3	0–1	2–5
Rubin Kazan	4–1	2–2	2–1	2–2	1–3	2–0	0–0	3–0	1–1	1–1		0–1	0–1	2–0	2–0	1–1
Saturn	5–1	1–1	0–1	0–0	1–2	2–1	1–2	1–1	2–0	2–0	1–1		0–0	2–2	1–1	1–3
Shinnik Yaroslavl	1–1	2–1	2–1	1–0	0–1	1–0	0–2	1–1	1–0	2–1	1–1	1–0		1–1	3–1	2–1
Spartak Moscow	0–1	6–0	0–2	2–2	3–1	1–1	1–3	3–2	1–0	1–1	2–0	0–2	1–0		1–2	0–3
Torpedo Moscow	3–2	3–2	0–1	3–1	0–1	3–1	1–1	1–1	4–1	1–0	1–0	1–2	2–0	2–1		3–1
Zenit St. Petersburg	3–2	0–0	0–3	2–0	1–2	1–0	0–2	2–3	0–1	3–2	4–3	2–2	1–0	2–0	3–1	

Legend: Blue = home team win; Yellow = draw; Red = away team win.

== Season statistics ==
=== Top goalscorers ===
As of matches played on 12 November 2004.

Rank	Player	Club	Goal
1	(Russia) Aleksandr Kerzhakov	Zenit	18
2	(Russia) Andrei Karyaka	Krylia	17
3	(Russia) Dmitri Sychev	Lokomotiv	15
3	(Russia) Aleksandr Panov	Torpedo	15
5	(Argentina) Héctor Bracamonte	Moscow	10
5	(Russia) Roman Pavlyuchenko	Spartak Moscow	10
5	(Russia) Valery Yesipov	Rotor	10
5	(Ukraine) Oleksandr Spivak	Zenit	10
9	(Lithuania) Robertas Poškus	Krylia	9
9	(Russia) Igor Lebedenko	Torpedo	9
9	(Russia) Igor Semshov	Torpedo	9
9	(Brazil) Vágner Love	CSKA	9
9	(Croatia) Ivica Olić	CSKA	9
9	(Russia) Dmitri Kirichenko	CSKA	9

1. FC Lokomotiv Moscow

Goalkeepers: Sergei Ovchinnikov (30), Ruslan Nigmatullin (1).
Defenders: Vadim Evseev (27 / 4), Dmitri Sennikov (26), Sergei Gurenko (Belarus) (26), Gennadiy Nizhegorodov (23), Malkhaz Asatiani (Georgia (country)) (19 / 1), Oleg Pashinin (Uzbekistan) (13), Jacob Lekgetho (South Africa) (6).
Midfielders: Dmitri Loskov (30 / 4), Diniyar Bilyaletdinov (25 / 5), Dmitri Khokhlov (24 / 6), Marat Izmailov (18 / 2), Vladimir Maminov (Uzbekistan) (18 / 1), Francisco Lima (Brazil) (15), Deividas Česnauskis (Lithuania) (10), Jorge Wagner (Brazil) (4), Leandro (Brazil) (1).
Forwards: Dmitri Sychev (27 / 15), James Obiorah (Nigeria) (15 / 1), Ruslan Pimenov (14 / 4), Winston Parks (Costa Rica) (13 / 1), Mikheil Ashvetia (Georgia (country)) (12), Milan Jovanović (Serbia) (3), Maksim Buznikin (1).
(league appearances and goals listed in brackets)

Manager: Yuri Syomin.

Transferred out during the season: Maksim Buznikin (on loan to FC Rotor Volgograd).

2. PFC CSKA Moscow

Goalkeepers: Igor Akinfeev (26), Veniamin Mandrykin (6).
Defenders: Aleksei Berezutski (27), Deividas Šemberas (Lithuania) (24), Sergei Ignashevich (22 / 1), Chidi Odiah (Nigeria) (21), Bohdan Shershun (Ukraine) (14), Vasili Berezutski (6).
Midfielders: Sergei Semak (30 / 5), Evgeni Aldonin (30), Jiří Jarošík (Czech Republic) (29 / 5), Rolan Gusev (28 / 4), Elvir Rahimić (Bosnia and Herzegovina) (26 / 1), Yuri Zhirkov (25 / 6), Osmar Ferreyra (Argentina) (13 / 2), Daniel Carvalho (Brazil) (13 / 1), Miloš Krasić (Serbia) (7), Juris Laizāns (Latvia) (4).
Forwards: Dmitri Kirichenko (26 / 9), Ivica Olić (Croatia) (24 / 9), Vágner Love (Brazil) (12 / 9), Denis Popov (2), Serghei Dadu (Moldova) (1).

One own goal scored by Luc Zoa (Cameroon) (FC Spartak Moscow).

Manager: Artur Jorge (Portugal) (until July), Valery Gazzaev (from July).

Transferred out during the season: Denis Popov (to FC Kuban Krasnodar).

3. FC Krylia Sovetov Samara

Goalkeepers: Aleksei Poliakov (Uzbekistan) (29), Aleksandr Makarov (1).
Defenders: Aleksandr Anyukov (29 / 2), Denis Kolodin (25 / 1), Patrick Ovie (Nigeria) (24), Moisés (Brazil) (22 / 1), Leilton (Brazil) (14), Omari Tetradze (14), Rafael Schmitz (Brazil) (9), Matthew Booth (South Africa) (8 / 1).
Midfielders: Andrei Karyaka (29 / 17), Denis Kovba (Belarus) (29 / 1), Sergei Vinogradov (26 / 4), Ognjen Koroman (Serbia) (26 / 1), Souza (Brazil) (25 / 3), Andrey Tikhonov (23 / 4), Anton Bober (13 / 1), Dmitri Kudryashov (9), Omonigho Temile (Nigeria) (5), Laryea Kingston (Ghana) (3).
Forwards: Robertas Poškus (Lithuania) (18 / 9), Catanha (Spain) (11 / 1), Roni (Brazil) (8 / 1).

One own goal each scored by Aleksei Yepifanov (FC Rotor Volgograd) and Nikolay Shirshov (Uzbekistan) (FC Rostov).

Manager: Gadzhi Gadzhiev.

Transferred out during the season: Catanha (Spain) (free agent), Rafael Schmitz (Brazil) (end of loan from (France) Lille).

== Attendances ==
#	Club	Average
1	Krylia Sovetov	25,500
2	Zenit	21,417
3	Amkar	15,987
4	Kuban	14,867
5	Alania	14,400
6	Shinnik	12,067
7	Lokomotiv Moscow	11,165
8	Saturn	10,568
9	Rostov	9,333
10	Spartak Moscow	9,110
11	PFC CSKA	9,067
12	Rubin	8,707
13	Rotor	8,260
14	Torpedo Moscow	5,633
15	Dynamo Moscow	5,300
16	FC Moscow	3,800

== See also ==
- 2004 in Russian football
