= Andrey Tikhonov (footballer) =

Russian footballer and manager

Andrey Tikhonov Андрей Тихонов
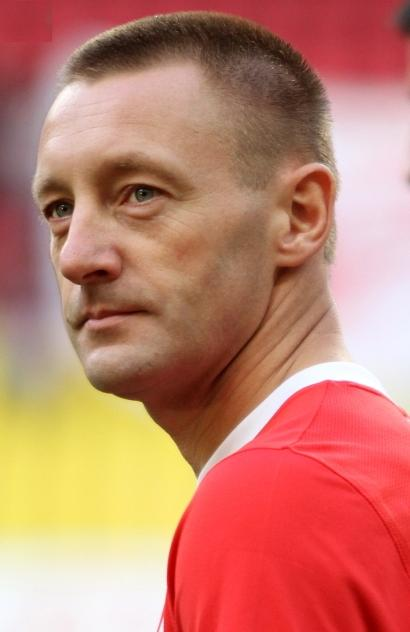
- Tikhonov with Spartak Moscow in 2011

Personal information
- Full name: Andrey Valeryevich Tikhonov
- Date of birth: 16 October 1970 (age 56)
- Place of birth: Korolyov, Russian SFSR, Soviet Union (now Russia)
- Height: 1.77 m (5 ft 10 in)
- Position: Midfielder

Team information
- Current team: Yenisey Krasnoyarsk (manager)

Senior career*
Years	Team	Apps	(Gls)
1991	Vympel Korolyov	32	(33)
1992	Titan Reutov	15	(8)
1992–2000	Spartak Moscow	191	(68)
1992–1995	→ Spartak-d Moscow	77	(77)
2000	Maccabi Tel Aviv	8	(1)
2001–2004	Krylia Sovetov Samara	98	(19)
2005–2007	Khimki	111	(41)
2008	Krylia Sovetov Samara	28	(7)
2009	Lokomotiv Astana	25	(12)
2010	Khimki	29	(2)
2011	Spartak Moscow	1	(0)
Total		615	(268)

International career
1996–2000	Russia	29	(1)

Managerial career
- 2008: Krylia Sovetov Samara (assistant)
- 2011–2012: Spartak Moscow (assistant)
- 2012–2013: Sparta Shchyolkovo
- 2013–2014: Spartak Moscow (assistant)
- 2014–2016: Krasnodar (assistant)
- 2016–2017: Yenisey Krasnoyarsk
- 2017–2018: Krylia Sovetov Samara
- 2020–2021: Astana
- 2024–2025: Yenisey Krasnoyarsk
- 2026–: Yenisey Krasnoyarsk
- * Club domestic league appearances and goals

Andrey Valeryevich Tikhonov (Russian: Андрей Валерьевич Тихонов; born 16 October 1970) is a Russian football manager and a former midfielder who is the manager of Yenisey Krasnoyarsk. Tikhonov is primarily known for having played for Spartak Moscow and the Russia national football team.

== Career ==
Tikhonov was spotted by the then-Spartak manager Oleg Romantsev, while playing for Titan Reutov, in a game against Spartak Moscow reserves. Tikhonov quickly broke into the starting line-up at his new club, becoming a key player at Spartak soon afterwards. Tikhonov won a total of eight Russian League titles with Spartak, before falling out with Oleg Romantsev. He then had a short loan spell in Israel, before signing a contract with Krylia Sovetov Samara. In February 2001, Tikhonov was training with Southampton, even featuring in one friendly for the club, but no deal was reached, mainly because the player already had a running one-year contract with Krylia Sovetov at the time.

An icon among Spartak fans, Tikhonov is often viewed as an underachiever on the international stage. He made his international debut in 1996, in a friendly against Malta.

In early 2011, he announced that he would be returning to Spartak Moscow but it was initially unconfirmed whether the 40-year-old midfielder would get playing time or whether he would simply be a coach. Later however, it was confirmed that he would be part of the squad.

He then started for the red-and-whites in a cup quarter-final game against Krasnodar on 20 April 2011. He got a warm reception from the home fans and was substituted off in the second half. On 18 September 2011, Tikonov has played his farewell match as Spartak defeated his former team, Krylya Sovetov, 3–0. Tikhonov made an assist and participated in another attack that ended with a goal before being substituted just before the end of the first half.

== Coaching career ==
On 1 June 2017, he left Yenisey Krasnoyarsk to join Krylia Sovetov Samara as a manager. He returned Krylia Sovetov Samara back to the Russian Premier League at the end of the 2017–18 season. After 9 games in the 2018–19 season, with Krylia in the 15th place, Tikhonov was dismissed from Krylia Sovetov.

On 24 October 2021, the club Tikhonov was managing, Astana, left the field for 20 minutes in a Kazakhstan Premier League game against Kairat to protest the refereeing. Astana returned to the game and the match was finished. On 27 October 2021, Kazakhstan Football Federation banned Tikhonov from any official football activity in Kazakhstan for 2 years.

== Controversies ==
While serving the mandatory time in the internal troops of the Soviet Army where he worked as a prison guard in Siberia, Tikhonov, according to himself, "Once ate a dog with the prisoners. Literally".

In 2020, when playing in a media football match, Andrey pounced on the cameraman with obscene insults and pushed him away cause the cameraman was filming the aftermath of the incident between the referee and Tikhonov's media-teammate Roman Shirokov. Though after the game, Tikhonov admitted he was wrong and apologized personally to the cameraman

Starting in 2022, Andrey Tikhonov regularly participates as speaker, player and coach in friendly football matches vs OMSDON Division (named after Dzerzhinsky) with "Z" signs in support for Russian war against Ukraine on the kit and in the background. So do other veterans, including Alenichev, Titov, Yuran, Filimonov, Khlestov, Shirko and Vyazmikin.

== Records and honours ==
- Scored 8 goals in one game for Spartak-d Moscow in a 1993 Russian Second League 8–0 victory over Rekord Aleksandrov. That was a Russian professional football record for most goals in one game he shared with Sergey Maslov and Gennady Korkin until Igor Kiselyov scored 10 goals in one game in 2001.
- Russian First Division best player: 2005, 2010.
- CIS Cup top goalscorer: 1997 (shared)

== Personal life ==
His son Mikhail Tikhonov is now a professional footballer.

== Career statistics ==
Appearances and goals by club, season and competition
Club	Season	League			Cup		Continental		Other		Total	
Club	Season	Division	Apps	Goals	Apps	Goals	Apps	Goals	Apps	Goals	Apps	Goals
Vympel Korolyov	1991	KFK	32	33	–		–		–		32	33
Titan Reutov	1992	Russian Second League	15	8	3	2	–		–		18	10
Spartak Moscow	1992	Russian Premier League	2	0	0	0	0	0	–		2	0
Spartak Moscow	1993	Russian Premier League	7	2	0	0	2 (Note: Appearances in the UEFA Champions League)	0	–		9	2
Spartak Moscow	1994	Russian Premier League	20	9	4	0	7	2	–		31	11
Spartak Moscow	1995	Russian Premier League	20	7	1	0	6	1	–		27	8
Spartak Moscow	1996	Russian Premier League	34	16	3	0	6 (Note: Two appearances in the UEFA Champions League, four appearances, four goals in the UEFA Cup)	4	–		43	20
Spartak Moscow	1997	Russian Premier League	24	10	1	0	8 (Note: Two appearances in the UEFA Champions League, six appearances, two goals in the UEFA Cup)	2	–		33	12
Spartak Moscow	1998	Russian Premier League	30	4	5	4	11 (Note: Three appearances, one goal in the UEFA Cup, eight appearances, one goal in the UEFA Champions League)	4	–		46	12
Spartak Moscow	1999	Russian Premier League	29	19	1	0	9 (Note: Eight appearances, five goals in the UEFA Champions League, one game in the UEFA Cup)	5	–		39	24
Spartak Moscow	2000	Russian Premier League	25	1	4	0	2	1	–		31	2
Spartak Moscow	Total		191	68	19	4	51	19	0	0	261	91
Spartak-d Moscow	1992	Russian Second League	23	22	2	1	–		–		25	23
Spartak-d Moscow	1993	Russian Second League	34	29	1	2	–		–		35	31
Spartak-d Moscow	1994	Russian Third League	16	23	–		–		–		16	23
Spartak-d Moscow	1995	Russian Third League	4	3	–		–		–		4	3
Spartak-d Moscow	Total		77	77	3	3	0	0	0	0	80	80
Maccabi Tel Aviv	2000–01	Israeli Premier League	8	1	–		–		–		8	1
Krylia Sovetov Samara	2001	Russian Premier League	29	4	4	0	–		–		33	4
Krylia Sovetov Samara	2002	Russian Premier League	17	2	2	0	1 (Note: Appearance in the UEFA Intertoto Cup)	0	–		20	2
Krylia Sovetov Samara	2003	Russian Premier League	29	9	4	1	–		1 (Note: Appearance in the Russian Premier League Cup)	1	34	11
Krylia Sovetov Samara	2004	Russian Premier League	23	4	8	0	–		–		31	4
Krylia Sovetov Samara	Total		98	19	18	1	1	0	1	1	118	21
Khimki	2005	Russian First League	41	15	7	4	–		–		48	19
Khimki	2006	Russian First League	42	22	1	0	–		–		43	22
Khimki	2007	Russian Premier League	28	4	2	0	–		–		30	4
Khimki	Total		111	41	10	4	0	0	0	0	121	45
Krylia Sovetov Samara	2008	Russian Premier League	28	7	1	0	–		–		29	7
Lokomotiv Astana	2009	Kazakhstan Premier League	25	12	3	0	–		–		28	12
Khimki	2010	Russian First League	29	2	1	0	–		–		30	2
Spartak Moscow	2011–12	Russian Premier League	1	0	1	0	–		–		2	0
Career total			615	268	59	14	52	19	1	1	727	302

=== International ===
Scores and results list Russia's goal tally first.

No	Date	Venue	Opponent	Score	Result	Competition
1.	10 November 1996	Stade Josy Barthel, Luxembourg City, Luxembourg	Luxembourg	1–0	4–0	1998 World Cup qualifier
