= Gennady Korkin =

Russian footballer (1963–2025)

Personal information
- Full name: Gennady Petrovich Korkin
- Date of birth: 23 August 1963
- Place of birth: Yangiyer, Uzbek SSR, USSR
- Date of death: 18 June 2025 (aged 61)
- Height: 1.80 m (5 ft 11 in)
- Position: Forward

Team information
- Current team: Metallurg Lipetsk (director)

Senior career*
Years	Team	Apps	(Gls)
1982–1989	Spartak Ordzhonikidze	228	(35)
1990	Dinamo Minsk	1	(0)
1990–1991	Metallurg Lipetsk	55	(22)
1992	PK-37	15	(13)
1993	Metallurg Lipetsk	23	(18)
1993–1994	Olympiakos Nicosia	19	(0)
1994–1995	Metallurg Lipetsk	45	(24)
1996	Spartak Anapa	25	(23)
1997	Zvezda Irkutsk	22	(3)

Managerial career
- 2001: Metallurg Lipetsk (director)
- 2002–2003: Metallurg Lipetsk (deputy general director)
- 2004–2006: Metallurg Lipetsk (director of sports)
- 2007–2025: Metallurg Lipetsk (director)
- * Club domestic league appearances and goals

Gennady Petrovich Korkin (Russian: Генна́дий Петро́вич Ко́ркин; 23 August 1963 – 18 June 2025) was a Russian professional footballer who worked as a director for Metallurg Lipetsk.

== Career ==
Korkin scored eight goals in one match in a 1996 Russian Third League game for FC Spartak Anapa against PFC Spartak-d Nalchik (a 13–0 win). That was a record for most goals in one game in Russian professional football he shared with Andrey Tikhonov and Sergey Maslov until Igor Kiselyov scored ten goals in one game in 2001.

== Death ==
Korean died on 18 June 2025, at the age of 61.

== Honours ==
- Russian Third League Zone 1 top scorer: 1996 (23 goals)
