= Smertin =

Smertin (masculine) or Smertina (feminine) is a Russian surname.

This surname is shared by the following people:

- Alexey Smertin (born 1975), Russian footballer
- Yevgeni Smertin (born 1969), retired Russian professional footballer and a current football coach
