= Fayzulin =

Fayzulin or Faizulin (Russian: Файзу́лин) is a Tatar surname that may refer to:

- Ilshat Faizulin (born 1973), Russian footballer
- Vladimir Fayzulin (born 1952), Soviet and Russian footballer and coach
- Viktor Fayzulin (born 1986), Russian footballer
