= Sergey Maslov (footballer, born 1975) =

Russian footballer

Personal information
- Full name: Sergey Alexandrovich Maslov
- Date of birth: 21 March 1975 (age 51)
- Place of birth: Vysotsky, Russian SFSR
- Height: 1.75 m (5 ft 9 in)
- Positions: Forward; midfielder

Youth career
- DYuSSh Aleksandrovskoye
- SUOR Stavropol

Senior career*
Years	Team	Apps	(Gls)
1991–1993	FC Mashuk Pyatigorsk	52	(3)
1993–1997	FC Dynamo Stavropol	138	(38)
1997–2000	FC Rostselmash Rostov-on-Don	39	(2)
2000	FC Sodovik Sterlitamak	4	(0)
2000–2001	Shafa Baku	1	(0)

Managerial career
- 2010: FC Dynamo Stavropol (director)
- 2011: FC Dynamo Stavropol (director of sports)
- 2011–2012: FC Dynamo Stavropol (general director)
- * Club domestic league appearances and goals

Sergey Alexandrovich Maslov (Russian: Серге́й Алекса́ндрович Ма́слов; born 21 March 1975) is a former Russian professional association football player.

== Club career ==
He made his professional debut in the Soviet Second League B in 1991 for FC Mashuk Pyatigorsk. He played 2 games in the UEFA Intertoto Cup 1999 for FC Rostselmash Rostov-on-Don.

He scored eight goals in one game in a 1999 Russian Second Division match for FC Rostselmash-d Rostov-on-Don against FC Iriston Vladikavkaz in a 9–2 victory. That was a record for most goals in one game in Russian professional football he shared with Andrey Tikhonov and Gennady Korkin until Igor Kiselyov scored ten goals in 2001.
