= Mikhail Beschastnykh =

Russian footballer

Personal information
- Full name: Mikhail Yevgenyevich Beschastnykh
- Date of birth: 1 April 1974 (age 52)
- Place of birth: Moscow, Russian SFSR
- Height: 1.80 m (5 ft 11 in)
- Positions: Forward; midfielder

Senior career*
Years	Team	Apps	(Gls)
1992–1994	FC Spartak Moscow	0	(0)
1995–1996	FC Lokomotiv Nizhny Novgorod	13	(3)
1996	FC Dynamo Stavropol	14	(0)
1997	FC Shinnik Yaroslavl	8	(0)
1999	FK Ventspils	9	(1)
1999–2000	FC Rubin Kazan	44	(5)
2001–2003	FC Metallurg Lipetsk	67	(6)
2003	FC Shatura		
2004–2007	FC Istra (amateur)		
2008	FC Senezh Solnechnogorsk		
2010	FC Dolgiye Prudy Dolgoprudny (amateur)		
2011–2012	FC Istra-2 Istra		
2012–2013	FC Zenit Moscow		
2014–2015	FC Odintsovo		
- * Club domestic league appearances and goals

Mikhail Yevgenyevich Beschastnykh (Russian: Михаил Евгеньевич Бесчастных; born 1 April 1974) is a former Russian footballer who played as a midfielder or forward.

== Playing career ==
He made his debut in the Russian Premier League in 1995 for FC Lokomotiv Nizhny Novgorod.

== Personal life ==
He is an identical twin brother of Vladimir Beschastnykh, a former Russian international player.
