= Vladimir Beschastnykh =

Russian footballer

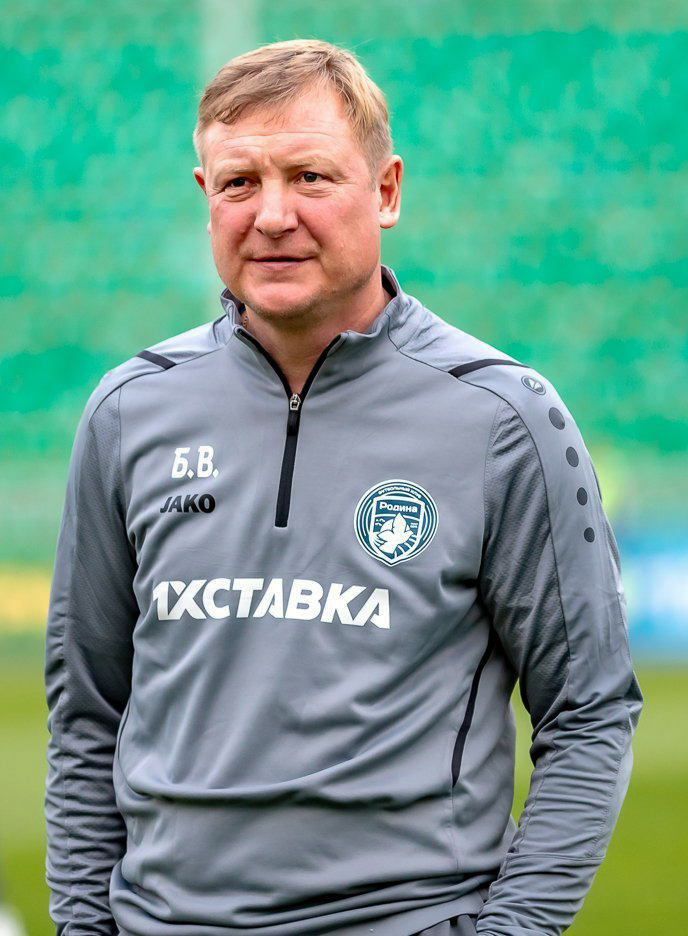
- Beschastnykh coaching Rodina Moscow in 2022

Personal information
- Full name: Vladimir Yevgenyevich Beschastnykh
- Date of birth: 1 April 1974 (age 52)
- Place of birth: Moscow, Soviet Union
- Height: 1.85 m (6 ft 1 in)
- Position: Forward

Team information
- Current team: Rodina Moscow (assistant coach)

Senior career*
Years	Team	Apps	(Gls)
1991	Zvezda Moscow	1	(0)
1991–1994	Spartak Moscow	62	(35)
1994–1996	Werder Bremen	56	(11)
1996–2001	Racing Santander	140	(28)
2001–2002	Spartak Moscow	42	(21)
2002–2003	Fenerbahçe	12	(1)
2003–2004	Kuban	21	(8)
2004–2005	Dinamo Moscow	21	(4)
2005	Oryol	22	(3)
2006–2007	Khimki	42	(9)
2007–2008	Volga Tver	8	(0)
2008	Astana	25	(4)
Total		452	(124)

International career
1992	USSR U21	1	(0)
1992–1995	Russia U21	12	(5)
1992–2003	Russia	71	(26)

Managerial career
- 2014–2015: Spartak Moscow (U21)
- 2016: Torpedo Armavir (assistant)
- 2016–2017: Tosno (assistant)
- 2019–2020: Fakel Voronezh
- 2021–: Rodina Moscow (assistant)
- * Club domestic league appearances and goals

Vladimir Yevgenyevich Beschastnykh (Russian: Влади́мир Евге́ньевич Бесча́стных, IPA: [vlɐˈdʲimʲɪr jɪvˈɡʲenʲjɪvʲɪdʑ bʲɪˈɕːasnɨx]; born 1 April 1974) is a Russian football manager and a former player who played as forward. He is an assistant coach with Rodina Moscow.

From 1992 to 2003, he played 71 internationals, and featured at two FIFA World Cups and UEFA Euro 1996. With 26 goals, was the all-time goal leader for the Russian national team until surpassed by Aleksandr Kerzhakov in September 2014. He is also the record goalscorer in the Commonwealth of Independent States Cup, with 20 goals for FC Spartak Moscow.

== Club career ==
Beschastnykh's club career that started in 1991, with Beschastnykh playing for Zvezda Moscow, Spartak Moscow, Werder Bremen, Racing Santander, Fenerbahçe, and Kuban Krasnodar. In the 2004–05 season he played for Oryol in the Russian First Division (second-level division after Premier Liga).

On 15 December 2005, Beschastnykh signed up with another First Division club – Khimki, a well-funded football team from a Moscow suburb, competing for a place in the upper echelon of the Russian championship.

In May 2007, Khimki released Beschastnykh. After playing for Kazakh Premier League side Astana in 2008, he retired from playing.

== International career ==
For Russia, Beschastnykh scored 26 goals in 71 caps, his first coming in 1992. Until Aleksandr Kerzhakov surpassed him in September 2014, he was the top goalscorer for the Russian national team. One of these goals came in the 2002 FIFA World Cup against Belgium; Beschastnykh also played in the 1994 edition of the tournament, as well as at UEFA Euro 1996. He became the winner Cyprus International Football Tournament 2003

== Coaching career ==
On 16 October 2019, he was appointed manager of Russian Football National League club Fakel Voronezh, with the team in last place in the table. He left Fakel on 5 September 2020.

== Personal life ==
His identical twin Mikhail Beschastnykh also played football professionally.

== Career statistics ==
=== Club ===
Appearances and goals by club, season and competition
Club	Season	League			Cup		Europe		Other		Total		Ref.
Club	Season	Division	Apps	Goals	Apps	Goals	Apps	Goals	Apps	Goals	Apps	Goals	Ref.
Spartak	1992	Russian Top League	20	7	2	2	–				22	9	
Spartak	1993	Russian Top League	29	18	3	1	6	0			38	19	
Spartak	1994	Russian Top League	13	10	4	1	10	1			27	12	
Spartak	Total		62	35	9	4	16	1			87	40	–
Werder Bremen	1994–95	Bundesliga	29	10	1	1	2	2	1 (Note: One appearance in German Super Cup)	1	33	14	
Werder Bremen	1995–96	Bundesliga	24	1	3	4	3	0	–		30	5	
Werder Bremen	1996–97	Bundesliga	3	0	1	0	2	0	–		6	0	
Werder Bremen	Total		56	11	5	5	7	2	1	1	69	19	–
Racing de Santander	1996–97	La Liga	35	10	5	0	–		–		40	10	
Racing de Santander	1997–98	La Liga	34	10	2	2	–		–		36	12	
Racing de Santander	1998–99	La Liga	34	6	7	0	–		–		41	6	
Racing de Santander	1999–2000	La Liga	24	1	3	2	–		–		27	3	
Racing de Santander	2000–01	La Liga	13	1	3	0	–		–		16	1	
Racing de Santander	Total		140	28	20	4	0	0	0	0	160	32	–
Spartak	2001	Russian Top Division	12	9	-	-	6	4			18	13	
Spartak	2002	Russian Premier League	30	12	2	2	6	0			38	14	
Spartak	Total		42	21	2	2	12	4			56	27	–
Fenerbahçe	2002–03	Süper Lig	12	1	-	-	-	-			12	1	
Kuban	2003	Russian First Division	16	8	-	-	-	-			16	8	
Kuban	2004	Russian Premier League	5	0	5	1	-	-			10	1	
Kuban	Total		21	8	5	1	0	0			26	9	–
Dynamo Moscow	2004	Russian Premier League	11	2	-	-	-	-			11	2	
Dynamo Moscow	2005	Russian Premier League	10	2	4	2	-	-			14	4	
Dynamo Moscow	Total		21	4	4	2	0	0			25	6	–
Oryol	2005	Russian First Division	22	3	-	-	-	-			22	3	
Khimki	2006	Russian First Division	42	9	-	-	-	-			42	9	
Khimki	2007	Russian Premier League	2	0	-	-	-	-			2	0	
Khimki	Total		44	9	0	0	0	0			44	9	–
Volga	2007	Russian Second Division	8	0	-	-	-	-			8	0	
Astana-1964	2008	Kazakhstan Premier League	25	4	-	-	-	-			25	4	
Career total			453	124	45	18	35	7	1	1	534	150	–

=== International goals ===
Scores and results list Russia's goal tally first, score column indicates score after each Beschastnykh goal.

List of international goals scored by Vladimir Beschastnykh
No.	Date	Venue	Opponent	Score	Result	Competition
1	17 August 1994	Wörtherseestadion, Klagenfurt, Austria	Austria	1–0	3–0	Friendly match
2	26 April 1995	Kaftanzoglio Stadium, Thessaloniki, Greece	Greece	3–0	3–0	UEFA Euro 1996 qualification
3	31 May 1995	Crvena Zvezda Stadium, Belgrade, Yugoslavia	(Federal Republic of Yugoslavia) Yugoslavia	2–1	2–1	Friendly match
4	7 June 1995	Stadio Olimpico, Serravalle, San Marino	San Marino	5–0	7–0	UEFA Euro 1996 qualification
5	2 June 1996	Dynamo Stadium, Moscow, Russia	Poland	2–0	2–0	Friendly match
6	19 June 1996	Anfield Road, Liverpool, England	Czech Republic	3–2	3–3	UEFA Euro 1996
7	1 September 1996	Dynamo Stadium, Moscow, Russia	Cyprus	4–0	4–0	1998 FIFA World Cup qualification
8	10 November 1996	Stade Josy Barthel, Luxembourg, Luxembourg	Luxembourg	3–0	4–0	1998 FIFA World Cup qualification
9	22 April 1998	Lokomotiv Stadium, Moscow, Russia	Turkey	1–0	1–0	Friendly match
10	27 March 1999	Hrazdan Stadium, Yerevan, Armenia	Armenia	3–0	3–0	UEFA Euro 2000 qualification
11	31 March 1999	Lokomotiv Stadium, Moscow, Russia	Andorra	2–0	6–1	UEFA Euro 2000 qualification
12	31 March 1999	Lokomotiv Stadium, Moscow, Russia	Andorra	5–0	6–1	UEFA Euro 2000 qualification
13	18 August 1999	Dinamo Stadium, Minsk, Belarus	Belarus	1–0	2–0	Friendly match
14	4 September 1999	Luzhniki Stadium, Moscow, Russia	Armenia	1–0	2–0	UEFA Euro 2000 qualification
15	23 February 2000	Kiryat Eliezer Stadium, Haifa, Israel	Israel	1–3	1–4	Friendly match
16	31 May 2000	Dynamo Stadium, Moscow, Russia	Slovakia	1–1	1–1	Friendly match
17	2 September 2000	Hardturm, Zürich, Switzerland	Switzerland	1–0	1–0	2002 FIFA World Cup qualification
18	25 April 2001	Crvena Zvezda Stadium, Belgrade, Yugoslavia	(Federal Republic of Yugoslavia) Yugoslavia	1–0	1–0	2002 FIFA World Cup qualification
19	5 September 2001	Tórsvøllur, Tórshavn, Faroe Islands	Faroe Islands	1–0	3–0	2002 FIFA World Cup qualification
20	5 September 2001	Tórsvøllur, Tórshavn, Faroe Islands	Faroe Islands	2–0	3–0	2002 FIFA World Cup qualification
21	6 October 2001	Dynamo Stadium, Moscow, Russia	Switzerland	1–0	4–0	2002 FIFA World Cup qualification
22	6 October 2001	Dynamo Stadium, Moscow, Russia	Switzerland	2–0	4–0	2002 FIFA World Cup qualification
23	6 October 2001	Dynamo Stadium, Moscow, Russia	Switzerland	3–0	4–0	2002 FIFA World Cup qualification
24	27 March 2002	A. Le Coq Arena, Tallinn, Estonia	Estonia	1–1	1–2	Friendly match
25	14 June 2002	Ecopa Stadium, Fukuroi, Japan	Belgium	1–1	2–3	2002 FIFA World Cup
26	7 September 2002	Lokomotiv Stadium, Moscow, Russia	Republic of Ireland	2–0	4–2	UEFA Euro 2004 qualification

== Honours ==
- Russian Championship: 1992, 1993, 1994, 2001
- Bundesliga: runner-up 1994–95
- Soviet Cup: 1991–92
- Russian Cup: 1993–94, 2002–03
- DFB-Supercup: 1994

Individual

- CIS Cup top goalscorer: 1994, 2002
