= Mikhail Murashov =

Russian footballer

Personal information
- Full name: Mikhail Nikolayevich Murashov
- Date of birth: 27 October 1973 (age 53)
- Height: 1.86 m (6 ft 1 in)
- Position: Defender

Senior career*
Years	Team	Apps	(Gls)
1991–1996	FC Torpedo-Luzhniki Moscow	35	(2)
1992–1996	FC Torpedo-Luzhniki-d Moscow	82	(3)
1997	FC Rostselmash-d Rostov-on-Don	5	(2)
1997–1998	FC Tom Tomsk	41	(2)
1999	FC Arsenal Tula	7	(1)
1999	FC Torpedo-Viktoriya Nizhny Novgorod	11	(0)
2001	FC Khimki	8	(0)
2002	FC Irtysh Omsk	9	(1)
2004	FC Lobnya-Alla Lobnya	24	(3)
2005	FC Lokomotiv-M Serpukhov	29	(2)
2006	FC Torpedo-RG Moscow	27	(5)
2007	FC Sheksna Cherepovets	19	(4)
2008–2009	FC Zelenograd	29	(2)

Managerial career
- 2014: FC Solyaris Moscow
- * Club domestic league appearances and goals as of 19:55, 4 November 2010 (UTC)

Mikhail Nikolayevich Murashov (Russian: Михаил Николаевич Мурашов; born 27 October 1973) is a Russian retired professional footballer and current coach.

== Honours ==
- Russian Cup winner: 1993.

== European competitions ==
- UEFA Cup 1992–93 with FC Torpedo Moscow: 1 game, 1 goal.
- UEFA Cup 1996–97 with FC Torpedo-Luzhniki Moscow: 1 game.
