= Aleksandr Garmashov =

Russian footballer

Personal information
- Full name: Aleksandr Borisovich Garmashov
- Date of birth: 8 February 1960 (age 66)
- Place of birth: Grozny, Russian SFSR
- Height: 1.80 m (5 ft 11 in)
- Positions: Defender; forward

Youth career
- Mozdok

Senior career*
Years	Team	Apps	(Gls)
1980	Ocean Kerch	8	(0)
1981–1982	Mashuk Pyatigorsk	20	(5)
1982	Trud Lermontov		
1983–1985	Kuban Krasnodar	66	(1)
1985	Spartak Ordzhonikidze	14	(1)
1986–1987	Krylia Sovetov Kuybyshev	49	(13)
1987	Torpedo Tolyatti	14	(3)
1988	Neftyanik Fergana	31	(2)
1989–1990	Lokomotiv Nizhny Novgorod	63	(2)
1991	Asmaral Kislovodsk	16	(2)
1991	Asmaral Moscow	16	(0)
1992	Lada Tolyatti	5	(0)

Managerial career
- 1993–1994: Lada Tolyatti (president)
- 1994: Lada Tolyatti
- 1995: Lada Tolyatti (general director)
- 1998–2003: Lada Tolyatti
- 2004: Chernomorets Novorossiysk
- 2004: Lisma-Mordovia Saransk (sporting director)
- * Club domestic league appearances and goals

Aleksandr Borisovich Garmashov (Russian: Александр Борисович Гармашов; born 8 February 1960) is a Russian professional football coach and a former player.
