= Aleksei Arefyev =

Russian footballer

Personal information
- Date of birth: 9 March 1971 (age 55)
- Place of birth: Moscow, Russian SFSR
- Height: 1.83 m (6 ft 0 in)
- Positions: Defender; midfielder

Senior career*
Years	Team	Apps	(Gls)
1987–1991	FC Torpedo Moscow	2	(0)
1992	Abahani Krira Chakra		
1992–1993	FC Torpedo Moscow	20	(0)
1992–1993	→ FC Torpedo-d	18	(1)
1994–1995	FC Lokomotiv Nizhny Novgorod	41	(1)
1996	FC Uralmash Yekaterinburg	8	(0)
- * Club domestic league appearances and goals

Aleksei Arefyev (Russian: Алексей Арефьев; born 9 March 1971) is a Russian retired professional footballer. He made his professional debut in the Soviet Top League in 1989 for FC Torpedo Moscow. He played 4 games in the UEFA Cup 1992–93 for FC Torpedo Moscow.

== Honours ==
- Soviet Top League bronze: 1991.
- Russian Cup winner: 1993.
