= Vali Gasimov =

Azerbaijani footballer (born 1968)

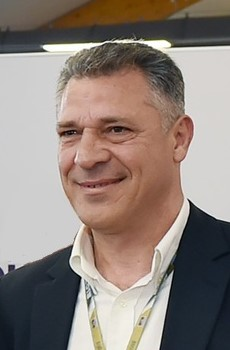
- Gasimov in 2018

Personal information
- Full name: Vali Aydin oglu Gasimov
- Date of birth: 4 October 1968 (age 58)
- Place of birth: Ganja, Soviet Union
- Height: 1.86 m (6 ft 1 in)
- Position: Forward

Youth career
- 1983–1984: Mayak Kharkiv
- 1984–1985: Metalist Kharkiv

Senior career*
Years	Team	Apps	(Gls)
1985	Mayak Kharkiv	3	(2)
1985–1986	Metalist Kharkiv	23	(2)
1987–1991	Neftchi Baku	155	(56)
1992	Spartak Moscow	6	(0)
1992	Dynamo Moscow	17	(16)
1993–1995	Real Betis	42	(9)
1995–1996	Albacete	22	(4)
1997	Écija	14	(0)
1997–1999	Vitória Setúbal	41	(15)
1999–2001	Imortal	46	(16)

International career
1985	Soviet Union (U-16)		
1994–1998	Azerbaijan	14	(0)

Managerial career
- 2007: CD Gelves
- 2010–2011: Azerbaijan (assistant)
- 2010–2012: Azerbaijan U19
- 2016: Neftchi Baku
- * Club domestic league appearances and goals

Vali Aydin oglu Gasimov (Azerbaijani: Vəli Aydın oğlu Qasımov, also spelled Veli Aydin oglu Kasumov; Russian: Вели Айдынович Касумов; born 4 October 1968) is an Azerbaijani football coach and a former player who played as a forward.

== Club career ==
Born in Kirovabad, Azerbaijan Soviet Socialist Republic, Soviet Union, Gasimov started playing for Mayak Kharkiv and Metalist Kharkiv. In 1992, he switched to Spartak Moscow but, unsettled, finished the season at neighbours Dynamo Moscow, being eventually crowned the first division's top scorer at 16 goals.

Gasimov was bought by Spain's Real Betis in January 1993, but would appear very irregularly in his two 1/2 seasons at the Andalusia side. After just three La Liga appearances in his final season, he finished his stint in the country with two clubs (and two relegations), Albacete Balompié and Écija Balompié (the latter in the second division, where he failed to score).

In summer 1997, Gasimov moved to Portugal with Vitória de Setúbal. He suffered a back injury which forced him to rest for a significant period of his debut season, but still netted 11 times in 24 matches. After a second campaign he retired still in the country, with Imortal DC in Algarve.

== International career ==
Gasimov played for the Soviet Union under-16 national team in 1985, helping the team to win the 1985 UEFA European Under-16 Championship.

Gasimov won 14 caps for Azerbaijan during four years, making his debut on 19 April 1994 in a 5–0 friendly loss to Malta.

== Managerial career ==
After retiring, Gasimov coached his national team's under-19 side.

On 14 September 2016, Gasimov was sacked as manager of Neftchi Baku.

== Career statistics ==
=== Club ===
Appearances and goals by club, season and competition
Club	Season	League			National cup (Note: Includes Soviet Cup, Russian Cup, Copa del Rey, Taça de Portugal.)		League cup (Note: Includes USSR Federation Cup.)		Continental		Total	
Club	Season	Division	Apps	Goals	Apps	Goals	Apps	Goals	Apps	Goals	Apps	Goals
Mayak Kharkiv	1985	Second League	3	2	0	0	—		—		3	2
Metalist Kharkiv	1985	Soviet Top League	8	1	0	0	—		—		8	1
Metalist Kharkiv	1986	Soviet Top League	15	1	0	0	1	1	—		16	2
Metalist Kharkiv	Total		23	2	0	0	1	1	—		24	3
Neftchi Baku	1987	Soviet Top League	23	0	3	2	7	1	—		33	3
Neftchi Baku	1988	Soviet Top League	25	2	2	0	6	4	—		33	6
Neftchi Baku	1989	Soviet First League	41	16	2	2	—		—		43	18
Neftchi Baku	1990	Soviet First League	28	22	0	0	—		—		28	22
Neftchi Baku	1991	Soviet First League	38	16	0	0	—		—		38	16
Neftchi Baku	Total		155	56	7	4	13	5	—		175	65
Spartak Moscow	1991	Soviet Top League	0	0	1	0	—		—		1	0
Spartak Moscow	1992	Russian Top League	6	0	0	0	—		—		6	0
Spartak Moscow	Total		6	0	1	0	—		0	0	7	0
Dynamo Moscow	1992	Russian Top League	17	16	2	2	—		6	1	25	19
Real Betis	1992–93	Segunda División	14	6	0	0	—		—		14	6
Real Betis	1993–94	Segunda División	25	3	7	4	—		—		32	7
Real Betis	1994–95	La Liga	3	0	4	0	—		—		7	0
Real Betis	Total		42	9	11	4	—		—		53	13
Albacete	1995–96	La Liga	22	4	0	0	—		—		24 (Note: includes two La Liga Play-Off matches)	4
Écija	1996–97	Segunda División	14	0	0	0	—		—		14	0
Vitória Setúbal	1997–98	Primeira Liga	24	11	0	0	—		—		24	11
Vitória Setúbal	1998–99	Primeira Liga	17	4	0	0	—		—		17	4
Vitória Setúbal	Total		41	15	0	0	—		—		41	15
Imortal	1999–2000	Segunda Liga	15	9	1	0	—		—		16	9
Imortal	2000–01	Segunda Liga	31	7	1	1	—		—		32	8
Imortal	Total		46	16	2	1	—		—		48	17
Career total			371	120	23	11	14	6	6	1	414	138

=== International ===
Appearances and goals by national team and year
National team	Year	Apps	Goals
Azerbaijan	1994	5	0
Azerbaijan	1995	3	0
Azerbaijan	1996	1	0
Azerbaijan	1997	2	0
Azerbaijan	1998	3	0
Total		14	0

== Honours ==
Neftchi Baku

- USSR Federation Cup runner-up: 1988

Spartak Moscow

- Soviet Cup: 1991–92

Soviet Union U16

- UEFA European Under-16 Championship: 1985

Individual

- Russian Premier League top scorer: 1992
- Best 33 players of the Russia Top League season: No. 1 — 1992
