= Vladimir Kostyuk =

Turkmenistani footballer

Personal information
- Full name: Vladimir Nikolayevich Kostyuk
- Date of birth: 28 May 1972 (age 54)
- Height: 1.82 m (5 ft 11 1/2 in)
- Positions: Midfielder; forward

Senior career*
| Years | Team | Apps | (Gls) |
| 1989–1991 | Köpetdag Aşgabat | 111 | (29) |
| 1992–1993 | FC Dynamo Moscow | 13 | (0) |
| 1994 | FC Erzu Grozny | 3 | (0) |
| 1996–1998 | FC Anzhi Makhachkala | 69 | (9) |

International career
| 1992–1993 | Turkmenistan | | |
- * Club domestic league appearances and goals

Vladimir Nikolayevich Kostyuk (Russian: Владимир Николаевич Костюк; born 28 May 1972) is a former Turkmenistani professional footballer.

== Club career ==
He made his professional debut in the Soviet Second League in 1989 for Köpetdag Aşgabat.

== Honours ==
- Russian Premier League bronze: 1992, 1993.
