= Aleksandr Shibayev (footballer) =

Russian footballer and coach

Personal information
- Full name: Aleksandr Arkadyevich Shibayev
- Date of birth: 5 September 1961 (age 65)
- Place of birth: Kalinin, Russian SFSR
- Height: 1.77 m (5 ft 10 in)
- Position: Defender

Youth career
- DYuSSh-7 Kalinin

Senior career*
Years	Team	Apps	(Gls)
1979	FC Volga Kalinin	10	(1)
1980–1981	FC Raduga Kalinin		
1981	FShM Moscow	11	(2)
1982–1984	FC Volga Kalinin	92	(0)
1985–1986	FC Spartak Moscow	22	(0)
1990	FC Spartak Moscow	0	(0)
1991	FC Vorskla Poltava	33	(0)
1992	FC Spartak Moscow	1	(0)
1992	→ FC Spartak-d Moscow	18	(0)
1992	FC Dynamo-Gazovik Tyumen	5	(0)
1993	FC Interros Moskovsky	23	(0)
1994	FC Saturn Ramenskoye	26	(1)
1996	FC Volga Tver	9	(0)

Managerial career
- 1987: FC Krylia Sovetov Moscow (youth)
- 1998: Dinaburg FC (assistant)
- 1999–2001: MFK Norilsk Nickel (futsal, assistant)
- 2002–2005: MFK Dinamo Moskva (futsal, assistant)
- 2005–2006: MFK Dinamo Moskva (futsal)
- 2006: MFK Dinamo Moskva (futsal, assistant)
- 2006–2008: MFK Dinamo Moskva (futsal)
- * Club domestic league appearances and goals

Aleksandr Arkadyevich Shibayev (Russian: Александр Аркадьевич Шибаев; born 5 September 1961) is a Russian professional football coach and former player.

== Club career ==
He made his professional debut in the Soviet Second League in 1979 for FC Volga Kalinin. He played 2 games in the UEFA Cup 1986–87 for FC Spartak Moscow.

== Honours ==
- Soviet Top League runner-up: 1985.
- Soviet Top League bronze: 1986.
- Russian Premier League champion: 1992.
