= Andrei Mulikov =

Russian footballer

Personal information
- Full name: Andrei Vladimirovich Mulikov
- Date of birth: October 19, 1968 (age 58)
- Height: 1.77 m (5 ft 9 1/2 in)
- Position: Defender

Senior career*
Years	Team	Apps	(Gls)
1989–1990	FC Terek Grozny	73	(0)
1991–1993	FC Asmaral Kislovodsk	72	(1)
1993	FC Asmaral Moscow	16	(0)
1994	FC Dynamo-d Moscow	17	(0)
1994	FC Lokomotiv Moscow	2	(0)
1995	FC Chernomorets Novorossiysk	22	(0)
1996	FC Uralan Elista	38	(1)
1997–2002	FC Dynamo Stavropol	208	(10)
2003	FC Zhemchuzhina Budyonnovsk	36	(0)
2005–2006	FC Dynamo Stavropol	19	(0)

Managerial career
- 2007: FC Dynamo Stavropol
- 2008: FC Dynamo Stavropol (assistant)
- 2008: FC Stavropol (assistant)
- 2008: FC Dynamo Stavropol
- 2009: FC Stavropol (assistant)
- 2012: FC Torpedo Armavir (assistant)
- 2014–2015: FC Dynamo GTS Stavropol (assistant)
- 2015–2016: FC Dynamo Stavropol (assistant)
- 2016–2018: FC Dynamo Stavropol
- 2018: FC Dynamo Stavropol (assistant)
- * Club domestic league appearances and goals

Andrei Vladimirovich Mulikov (Russian: Андрей Владимирович Муликов; born 19 October 1968) is a Russian professional football coach and a former player.

== Club career ==
He made his professional debut in the Soviet Second League in 1989 for FC Terek Grozny.

== Honours ==
- Russian Premier League bronze: 1994.
