= Boris Dobashin =

Russian footballer

Personal information
- Full name: Boris Alekseyevich Dobashin
- Date of birth: April 8, 1966 (age 60)
- Height: 1.90 m (6 ft 3 in)
- Positions: Defender; midfielder

Senior career*
Years	Team	Apps	(Gls)
1982	FShM Moscow	1	(0)
1984	FShM Moscow	7	(1)
1989	Dynamo Moscow 2	31	(4)
1990–1991	Dinamo Sukhumi	36	(2)
1992	Spartak Vladikavkaz	6	(0)
1992–1993	Inter Bratislava	10	(0)
- * Club domestic league appearances and goals

Boris Alekseyevich Dobashin (Russian: Борис Алексеевич Добашин; born April 8, 1966) is a retired Russian professional footballer.

== Honours ==
- Russian Premier League runner-up: 1992.
