= Grigori Ivanov =

Russian footballer

Personal information
- Full name: Grigori Vladimirovich Ivanov
- Date of birth: 28 November 1971 (age 54)
- Place of birth: Grozny, Russian SFSR
- Height: 1.80 m (5 ft 11 in)
- Position: Forward

Senior career*
Years	Team	Apps	(Gls)
1990–1991	FC Spartak Vladikavkaz	30	(6)
1992	FC Metalurh Zaporizhya		
1992	FC Spartak Vladikavkaz	3	(0)
1992–1994	FC Avtodor Vladikavkaz	77	(30)
1995	FC Rostselmash Rostov-on-Don	4	(0)
1995–1997	FC Avtodor Vladikavkaz	91	(27)
1998–1999	FC Volgar-Gazprom Astrakhan	68	(21)
2000	FC Nosta Novotroitsk	16	(2)
2001	FC Avtodor Vladikavkaz	28	(15)
2002	FC Luch Vladivostok	7	(0)
2003	FC Spartak Lukhovitsy	5	(0)
2003–2004	FC Sudostroitel Astrakhan	41	(6)
- * Club domestic league appearances and goals

Grigori Vladimirovich Ivanov (Russian: Григорий Владимирович Иванов; born 28 November 1971) is a former Russian professional footballer.

== Club career ==
He made his professional debut in the Soviet First League in 1990 for FC Spartak Vladikavkaz.

== Honours ==
- Russian Premier League runner-up: 1992.
