= Vladimir Kalashnikov =

Russian footballer and coach

Personal information
- Full name: Vladimir Dmitriyevich Kalashnikov
- Date of birth: 17 December 1953 (age 72)
- Height: 1.71 m (5 ft 7 1/2 in)
- Positions: Midfielder; forward

Team information
- Current team: FC Ural Sverdlovsk Oblast (asst manager/director)

Senior career*
Years	Team	Apps	(Gls)
1971–1975	FC Uralets Nizhny Tagil		
1976–1980	FC Uralmash Sverdlovsk		

Managerial career
- 1981–1985: FC Uralets Nizhny Tagil (assistant)
- 1987–1989: FC Uralets Nizhny Tagil
- 1990–1994: FC Uralmash Yekaterinburg (assistant)
- 1994–1995: FC Uralmash Yekaterinburg
- 1996: FC Uralmash Yekaterinburg (director)
- 1998: FC Uralmash Yekaterinburg
- 2000: FC Uralmash Yekaterinburg (assistant)
- 2004: FC Ural Sverdlovsk Oblast
- 2005: FC Ural Sverdlovsk Oblast (director)
- 2006–: FC Ural Sverdlovsk Oblast (assistant)
- 2010–: FC Ural Sverdlovsk Oblast (director)
- * Club domestic league appearances and goals

Vladimir Dmitriyevich Kalashnikov (Russian: Владимир Дмитриевич Калашников; born 17 December 1953) is a Russian professional football coach and a former player. Currently, he works as an assistant coach and a director with FC Ural Sverdlovsk Oblast.
