= Maksim Cheltsov =

Russian footballer

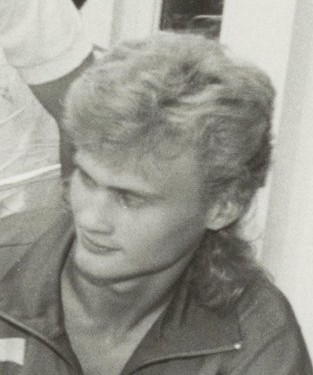

Personal information
- Full name: Maksim Mikhailovich Cheltsov
- Date of birth: 4 September 1970 (age 56)
- Place of birth: Moscow, Russian SFSR
- Height: 1.78 m (5 ft 10 in)
- Position: Defender

Youth career
- Torpedo Moscow

Senior career*
Years	Team	Apps	(Gls)
1987–1995	Torpedo Moscow	97	(0)
1997	Torpedo-ZIL Moscow	32	(1)

Managerial career
- 2000: Torpedo-ZIL Moscow (director)
- 2001: Torpedo-ZIL Moscow (administrator)
- 2002: Saturn-RenTV Ramenskoye (reserves scout)
- 2003–2004: Saturn Ramenskoye (technical director)
- * Club domestic league appearances and goals

Maksim Mikhailovich Cheltsov (Russian: Максим Михайлович Чельцов; born 4 September 1970) is a former Russian professional footballer.

== Club career ==
He made his professional debut in the Soviet Top League in 1988 for FC Torpedo Moscow.

== Honours ==
- Soviet Top League bronze: 1988, 1991.
- Russian Cup winner: 1993.

== European club competitions ==
With FC Torpedo Moscow.

- UEFA Cup 1991–92: 2 games.
- UEFA Cup 1992–93: 4 games.
- UEFA Cup Winners' Cup 1993–94: 4 games.
