= Valeri Frolov (footballer, born 1949) =

Russian footballer and coach

Personal information
- Full name: Valeri Petrovich Frolov
- Date of birth: 16 August 1949 (age 77)
- Place of birth: Yaroslavl, Russian SFSR
- Height: 1.80 m (5 ft 11 in)
- Position: Striker

Senior career*
Years	Team	Apps	(Gls)
1969–1971	FC Shinnik Yaroslavl	81	(15)
1971–1972	PFC CSKA Moscow	4	(1)
1973–1976	FC Shinnik Yaroslavl	78	(24)

Managerial career
- 1980: FC Shinnik Yaroslavl (assistant)
- 1984–1991: FC Shinnik Yaroslavl (assistant)
- 1992–1994: FC Shinnik Yaroslavl (director)
- 1992: FC Shinnik Yaroslavl
- 1995–1999: FC Shinnik Yaroslavl (president)
- 2000–2001: FC Shinnik Yaroslavl (VP)
- 2002–2003: FC Shinnik Yaroslavl (general director)
- 2004: FC Shinnik Yaroslavl (advisor to the president)
- 2004: FC Shinnik Yaroslavl (caretaker)
- 2005: FC Shinnik Yaroslavl (director of sports)
- 2006: FC Shinnik Yaroslavl (VP)
- 2007: FC Shinnik Yaroslavl (director of sports)
- 2008: FC Shinnik Yaroslavl (advisor to the president)
- 2009: FC Shinnik Yaroslavl (deputy general director)
- 2013: FC Shinnik Yaroslavl (general director)
- * Club domestic league appearances and goals

Valeri Petrovich Frolov (Russian: Валерий Петрович Фролов; born 16 August 1949) is a Russian professional football coach and a former player.

== Career ==
Born in Yaroslavl, Frolov was a product of local side FC Shinnik Yaroslavl's youth academy. He played professionally for Shinnik for seven seasons, either side of a two-year spell at PFC CSKA Moscow, scoring 38 goals in 158 league matches with Shinnik.
