= Aleksei Savchenko =

Russian footballer

Personal information
- Full name: Aleksei Yevgenyevich Savchenko
- Date of birth: 14 May 1975 (age 51)
- Place of birth: Moscow, Russian SFSR
- Height: 1.76 m (5 ft 9 in)
- Position: Midfielder

Youth career
- FC Dynamo Moscow

Senior career*
Years	Team	Apps	(Gls)
1991	FC Dynamo-2 Moscow	0	(0)
1992	FC Dynamo-d Moscow	19	(3)
1992–1994	FC Dynamo Moscow	15	(0)
1995–1997	FC Tyumen	35	(5)
1998–2000	FC Khimki	64	(6)
- * Club domestic league appearances and goals

Aleksei Yevgenyevich Savchenko (Russian: Алексей Евгеньевич Савченко; born 14 May 1975) is a former Russian professional footballer.

== Club career ==
He made his professional debut in the Russian Second Division in 1992 for FC Dynamo-d Moscow.

== Honours ==
- Russian Premier League bronze: 1992, 1993.

== European club competitions ==
With FC Dynamo Moscow.

- UEFA Cup 1992–93: 2 games.
- UEFA Cup 1993–94: 1 game.
