= Badri Spanderashvili =

Soviet and Georgian footballer (1969–2021)

Personal information
- Date of birth: 10 November 1969
- Place of birth: Samgori, Georgian SSR
- Date of death: 7 September 2021 (aged 51)
- Height: 1.71 m (5 ft 7 in)
- Position: Midfielder

Youth career
- ROShISP-10 Rostov-on-Don

Senior career*
Years	Team	Apps	(Gls)
1985–1986	FC Atommash Volgodonsk	25	(2)
1987	SKA Rostov	14	(0)
1988–1989	FC Dila Gori	22	(2)
1989–1991	Spartak Vladikavkaz	72	(11)
1991–1992	Alazani Gurjaani	32	(5)
1992	Dynamo Moscow	7	(0)
1993	Dynamo Stavropol	3	(0)
1993–1995	FC Rostselmash	91	(20)
1996	FC Istochnik Rostov-on-Don	13	(3)
1996–2001	Chernomorets Novorossiysk	92	(5)
2001	Lokomotiv Nizhny Novgorod	4	(0)

Managerial career
- 2006–2008: FC Bataysk-2007
- 2009: SKA Rostov
- 2011–2012: FC Olimpia Gelendzhik (assistant)
- * Club domestic league appearances and goals

Badri Spanderashvili (Georgian: ბადრი სპანდერაშვილი; Russian: Бадри Гивиевич Спандерашвили; 10 November 1969 – 7 September 2021) was a Georgian-Russian professional football coach and a former player.

== Club career ==
He played for FC Dynamo Moscow, FC Rostov, FC Chernomorets Novorossiysk and FC Lokomotiv Nizhny Novgorod in the Russian Premier League.
