= Igor Varlamov =

Russian footballer (1971–2022)

Personal information
- Full name: Igor Valentinovich Varlamov
- Date of birth: 12 August 1971
- Place of birth: Yaroslavl, Russian SFSR, USSR
- Date of death: 25 September 2022 (aged 51)
- Place of death: Novorossiysk, Krasnodar Krai, Russia
- Height: 1.83 m (6 ft 0 in)
- Position: Defender

Youth career
- Torpedo Vladimir

Senior career*
| Years | Team | Apps | (Gls) |
| 1989–1991 | Torpedo Vladimir | 75 | (0) |
| 1992–1993 | Dynamo Moscow | 21 | (0) |
| 1994–1995 | Chernomorets Novorossiysk | 12 | (0) |
| 1996–1998 | Tyumen | 52 | (1) |
| 1998 | Lokomotiv Nizhny Novgorod | 1 | (0) |
| 1999–2000 | Anzhi Makhachkala | 41 | (0) |
| 2001–2004 | Spartak Nalchik | 111 | (2) |

International career
| 1992 | CIS U21 | 2 | (0) |
| 1992 | Russia U21 | 1 | (0) |
- * Club domestic league appearances and goals

Igor Valentinovich Varlamov (Russian: Игорь Валентинович Варламов; 12 August 1971 – 25 September 2022) was a Russian professional footballer who played as a defender.

== Club career ==
Varlamov made his debut in the Russian Premier League in 1992 for Dynamo Moscow. He played four games in the 1992–93 UEFA Cup for Dynamo Moscow.

== Honours ==
- Russian Premier League bronze: 1992, 1993
