= Gennadi Grishin =

Russian footballer

Gennadi Grishin Геннадий Гришин
Personal information
- Full name: Gennadi Alekseyevich Grishin
- Date of birth: 25 November 1964 (age 61)
- Place of birth: Dankov, Russian SFSR
- Height: 1.70 m (5 ft 7 in)
- Position: Midfielder

Youth career
- DYuSSh Dankov
- FC Metallurg Lipetsk

Senior career*
Years	Team	Apps	(Gls)
1982–1983	FC Metallurg Lipetsk	55	(12)
1984–1985	FC Iskra Smolensk	77	(7)
1986–1992	FC Torpedo Moscow	155	(26)
1992–1993	VfB Leipzig	20	(3)
1993	FC Torpedo Moscow	11	(2)
1993–1994	Hapoel Haifa F.C.	20	(1)
1994–1995	FC Torpedo Moscow	36	(4)
1996–1998	FC Shinnik Yaroslavl	83	(15)
1998–1999	FC Tom Tomsk	52	(7)
2000	FC KAMAZ-Chally Naberezhnye Chelny	9	(1)

Managerial career
- 2003–2008: FC Moscow (academy coach)
- * Club domestic league appearances and goals

Gennadi Alekseyevich Grishin (Russian: Геннадий Алексеевич Гришин; born 25 November 1964) is a former Russian professional footballer.

== Club career ==
He made his professional debut in the Soviet Second League in 1982 for FC Metallurg Lipetsk.

== Honours ==
- Soviet Top League bronze: 1988, 1991.
- Soviet Cup winner: 1986.
- Soviet Cup finalist: 1988, 1989, 1991.
- Russian Cup winner: 1993.

== European club competitions ==
With FC Torpedo Moscow.

- UEFA Cup Winners' Cup 1986–87: 2 games.
- UEFA Cup 1988–89: 2 games.
- UEFA Cup Winners' Cup 1989–90: 4 games.
- UEFA Cup 1990–91: 7 games, 1 goal.
- UEFA Cup 1991–92: 4 games, 1 goal.
- UEFA Cup 1992–93: 4 games, 1 goal (also scored a decisive penalty kick in the shootout against Manchester United).
- UEFA Cup Winners' Cup 1993–94: 2 games.
