= Igor Sklyarov =

Russian footballer

Personal information
- Full name: Igor Yevgenyevich Sklyarov
- Date of birth: 31 August 1966 (age 60)
- Place of birth: Taganrog, Russian SFSR, Soviet Union
- Height: 1.82 m (6 ft 0 in)
- Positions: Defender; midfielder

Senior career*
Years	Team	Apps	(Gls)
1982	Torpedo Taganrog	4	(0)
1983–1986	SKA Rostov-on-Don	58	(3)
1987–1994	Dynamo Moscow	130	(5)
1998	Metallurg Lipetsk	9	(0)
1999	Spartak Ryazan	18	(0)

International career
1987–1988	Soviet Union Olympic	9	(0)
1993	Russia	1	(0)

Managerial career
- 2009–2010: Sibir Novosibirsk (director of sports)
Medal record
Men's football
Representing Soviet Union
Gold medal – first place	1988 Seoul	Team competition
- * Club domestic league appearances and goals

Igor Yevgenyevich Sklyarov (Russian: Игорь Евгеньевич Скляров; born 31 August 1966) is a former Russian footballer.

== Background ==
Igor grew up in Russia, playing football his whole life, and eventually got the chance to play in the 1988 Olympics with the USSR. He helped his team win the gold in the Olympics. He won 1 cap for the Russia national football team in 1993.

He married his wife Natalia Yurchenko, who is a 5-time world champion in gymnastics, in November 1988. The family moved to the US in 1999, settling in Lehigh Valley, Pennsylvania where Igor coached year round football and Natalia was a gymnastics coach. In January 2009, Igor accepted a position with a professional soccer club in Novosibirsk, Russia. Now he lives in Chicago coaching the u-14 team, FC Drive.

== Honours ==
- Soviet Top League bronze: 1990.
- Russian Premier League bronze: 1992, 1993.

== European club competitions ==
- UEFA Cup 1987–88 with FC Dynamo Moscow: 4 games.
- UEFA Cup 1991–92 with FC Dynamo Moscow: 4 games.
- UEFA Cup 1992–93 with FC Dynamo Moscow: 6 games, 2 goals.

== Coaching and Training ==
- Gold Medal winner Men's soccer team, 1988 Olympics, Seoul, Korea
- Pro Player FC "Dynamo", Moscow, 245 Premier League games
- 1998 Evaluator U-18 National Youth Team
- Head Coach, Saucon Valley High School boys team
- Head Coach, ENCO U-17 boys team
- Head Coach, Western Lehigh United U-15 boys team
- Director "Pro Olympic Soccer Program"
- European soccer scout of USA, Present of Spain, Germany, France, England, Ukraine, Russia

== Education ==
- Bachelor's degree in Physical Education
- Diploma of Physical Culture and Coaching
- International Coach License 'B'
- NSCAA Coach License
