= Vladimir Baksheyev =

Russian footballer

Personal information
- Full name: Vladimir Nikolayevich Baksheyev
- Date of birth: 22 April 1970 (age 56)
- Place of birth: Krasnoyarsk, Russian SFSR
- Height: 1.74 m (5 ft 8 1/2 in)
- Positions: Midfielder; forward

Senior career*
Years	Team	Apps	(Gls)
1988	FC Energetik Kustanay	0	(0)
1988	FC Avtomobilist Krasnoyarsk	5	(0)
1990	FC Avtomobilist Krasnoyarsk	27	(5)
1991	FC Kuzbass Kemerovo	38	(6)
1992–1993	FC Spartak Moscow	1	(0)
1994	FC Tekhinvest-M Moskovsky	11	(1)
1995–1996	FC Metallurg Krasnoyarsk	64	(15)
1997–1999	FC Saturn Ramenskoye	73	(12)
2000	FC Nosta Novotroitsk	11	(0)
- * Club domestic league appearances and goals

Vladimir Nikolayevich Baksheyev (Russian: Владимир Николаевич Бакшеев; born 22 April 1970) is a former Russian professional footballer.

== Club career ==
He made his professional debut in the Soviet Second League in 1988 for FC Avtomobilist Krasnoyarsk. He played 2 games in the European Cup Winners' Cup 1992–93 for FC Spartak Moscow.

== Honours ==
- Russian Premier League champion: 1992.
