= Yuri Petrov =

Russian footballer (1974–2023)

Personal information
- Full name: Yuri Anatolyevich Petrov
- Date of birth: 18 July 1974
- Place of birth: Kryvyi Rih, Ukrainian SSR, Soviet Union
- Date of death: 28 April 2023 (aged 48)
- Place of death: Tilburg, Netherlands
- Height: 1.75 m (5 ft 9 in)
- Position: Striker

Senior career*
Years	Team	Apps	(Gls)
1991	Dnipro Dnipropetrovsk	14	(1)
1992	Spartak Moscow	5	(1)
1992–1994	Lokomotiv Moscow	20	(2)
1994	SK Mykolaiv	2	(0)
1994–1995	RKC Waalwijk	12	(7)
1995–1997	FC Twente	74	(15)
1998–2001	RKC Waalwijk	71	(10)
2001–2002	ADO Den Haag (loan)	32	(5)
2002	RKC Waalwijk	2	(0)
2003	Alania Vladikavkaz	4	(2)
2003	Volyn Lutsk	9	(1)
2004	SKA-Energiya Khabarovsk	13	(0)
2004–2006	Metalist Kharkiv	12	(0)
2006–2008	FC Volendam	40	(5)
2008–2009	ASWH		
- Haaglandia
- PSV (amateur team)

International career
1993	Russia U20	3	(0)
1994	Russia U21	5	(0)
- * Club domestic league appearances and goals

Yuri Anatolyevich Petrov (Ukrainian: Юрій Анатолійович Петров, Russian: Юрий Анатольевич Петров; 18 July 1974 – 28 April 2023) was a professional footballer who played as a striker. Born in the Ukrainian SSR, Petrov represented Russia internationally at youth level.

Petrov spent most of his professional career in the Netherlands, notably with RKC Waalwijk and FC Twente.

== Club career ==
Petrov was born in Kryvyi Rih. He signed a professional contract with Ukrainian club Dnipro Dnipropetrovsk at the age of 16.

He played one game in the 1993–94 UEFA Cup for Lokomotiv Moscow.

Eredivisie club FC Twente signed him for a club record fee from RKC Waalwijk. He was fired by FC Twente in 1998 because of alcohol abuse. He later played for clubs in Russia and Ukraine and returned to Holland to play for FC Volendam in 2006.

In the 2000–01 season Petrov helped RKC Waalwijk achieve seventh place in the Eredivisie after the club had been at the bottom of the league in previous years.

== International career ==
Petrov represented Russia at the 1993 FIFA World Youth Championship.

== Personal life and death ==
Petrov was married to Tanya Kazakova and they had two children. They divorced because of him developing a severe drinking problem.

At the end of 2012 he was living at Traverse, a social assistance centre in Tilburg.

Petrov died on 28 April 2023 in Tilburg, at the age of 48.
