= Vyacheslav Tsaryov =

Russian footballer

Personal information
- Full name: Vyacheslav Vyacheslavovich Tsaryov
- Date of birth: 4 May 1971
- Place of birth: Gorky, Russian SFSR
- Date of death: 22 September 2010 (aged 39)
- Place of death: Khimki, Russia
- Height: 1.81 m (5 ft 11 1/2 in)
- Position: Defender

Youth career
- Krasnoye Sormovo Gorky
- EShVSM Moscow

Senior career*
Years	Team	Apps	(Gls)
1987	EShVSM Moscow	1	(0)
1988–1994	FC Dynamo Moscow	72	(1)
1995–1996	FC Lokomotiv Moscow	8	(0)
1997	FC Dynamo Moscow	4	(0)
1998	FC Uralan Elista	30	(2)
2000–2001	FC Sokol Saratov	25	(0)
2001–2002	FC Khimki	9	(0)
Total		149	(3)
- * Club domestic league appearances and goals

Vyacheslav Vyacheslavovich Tsaryov (Russian: Вячеслав Вячеславович Царёв; 4 May 1971 – 22 September 2010) was a Russian professional footballer.

== Club career ==
He made his debut in the Soviet Top League in 1990 for FC Dynamo Moscow.

== Death ==
He died in September 2010 after an acute illness.

== Honours ==
- Russian Premier League runner-up: 1995.
- Russian Premier League bronze: 1992, 1993, 1997.
- Soviet Top League bronze: 1990.
- Russian Cup winner: 1996.

== European club competitions ==
- UEFA Cup 1991–92 with FC Dynamo Moscow: 6 games.
- UEFA Cup 1992–93 with FC Dynamo Moscow: 5 games.
