= Yuri Marushkin =

Russian footballer and manager

Personal information
- Full name: Yuri Fyodorovich Marushkin
- Date of birth: 10 July 1944
- Date of death: 12 December 2015 (aged 71)
- Place of death: Volgograd, Russia
- Position: Midfielder

Youth career
- 1954–1962: FC Dynamo Moscow

Senior career*
Years	Team	Apps	(Gls)
1965–1974	FC Dynamo Bryansk	389	(53)
1975	FC Desna Bryansk		

Managerial career
- 1973: FC Dynamo Bryansk
- 1974: FC Dynamo Bryansk (assistant)
- 1976: FC Dynamo Bryansk (director)
- 1977–1978: FC Dynamo Bryansk
- 1981–1991: FC Dynamo Bryansk
- 1991–1992: FC Kuban Krasnodar
- 1993–1995: FC Rotor-d Volgograd
- 1996–1997: FC Rotor Volgograd (assistant)
- 1998–1999: FC Rotor-d Volgograd
- 2004: FC Rotor Volgograd
- 2004: FC Rotor Volgograd (assistant)
- 2004: FC Rotor Volgograd
- * Club domestic league appearances and goals

Yuri Fyodorovich Marushkin (Russian: Юрий Фёдорович Марушкин; 10 July 1944 – 12 December 2015) was a Russian football player and manager.
