= Gennadi Filimonov =

Russian footballer

Personal information
- Full name: Gennadi Valentinovich Filimonov
- Date of birth: 21 September 1962 (age 64)
- Height: 1.89 m (6 ft 2 1/2 in)
- Positions: Midfielder; defender

Youth career
- FC Metallurg Tula

Senior career*
Years	Team	Apps	(Gls)
1984	FC Arsenal Tula	27	(0)
1988	FC Metallurg Lipetsk	36	(1)
1989	FC Torpedo Moscow	0	(0)
1989	FC Lokomotiv Moscow	0	(0)
1989–1991	FC Tsement Novorossiysk	81	(6)
1991–1992	FC Lokomotiv Moscow	6	(0)
1992–1994	FC Torpedo Moscow	43	(1)
1995	FC Irtysh Omsk	13	(1)
1996	FC Volgar-Gazprom Astrakhan	9	(0)
1996–1997	FC Volga Ulyanovsk	32	(0)
1998	FC Kolomna	16	(1)
1999	FC Spartak Yoshkar-Ola		
- * Club domestic league appearances and goals

Gennadi Valentinovich Filimonov (Russian: Геннадий Валентинович Филимонов; born 21 September 1962) is a former Russian professional footballer.

== Club career ==
He made his professional debut in the Soviet Second League in 1984 for FC Arsenal Tula.

== Honours ==
- Russian Cup winner: 1993.

== European club competitions ==
With FC Torpedo Moscow.

- UEFA Cup 1992–93: 4 games.
- UEFA Cup 1993–94: 1 game.
