= Vladimir Fayzulin =

Russian footballer (born 1952)

Personal information
- Full name: Vladimir Fayzulovich Fayzulin
- Date of birth: 25 November 1952 (age 73)
- Place of birth: Stalingrad, Russian SFSR, Soviet Union
- Height: 1.67 m (5 ft 6 in)
- Positions: Forward; midfielder

Team information
- Current team: Rotor Volgograd (assistant manager)

Senior career*
Years	Team	Apps	(Gls)
1972–1975	Rotor Volgograd	113	(23)
1976	SKA Rostov-on-Don	25	(3)
1977	Spartak Ordzhonikidze	9	(1)
1978–1980	Rotor Volgograd	?	(55)
1981–1982	Spartak Kostroma	74	(10)
1983–1985	Rotor Volgograd	80	(17)

Managerial career
- 1986: Rotor Volgograd (assistant)
- 1987: Rotor Volgograd (director)
- 1990–2002: Rotor Volgograd (assistant)
- 1990: Rotor Volgograd (caretaker)
- 1992: Rotor Volgograd (caretaker)
- 1998: Rotor-2 Volgograd
- 2003–2004: Rotor Volgograd
- 2004: Rotor Volgograd
- 2005: Metallurg Lipetsk
- 2007–2008: Sibir Novosibirsk
- 2008–2009: SKA-Energiya Khabarovsk
- 2010: Rotor Volgograd
- 2018: Rotor-2 Volgograd
- 2019–2022: Torpedo Volzhskiy
- 2022–2023: Rotor Volgograd (assistant)
- 2023: Rotor Volgograd (caretaker)
- 2023–: Rotor Volgograd (assistant)
- * Club domestic league appearances and goals

Vladimir Fayzulovich Fayzulin (Russian: Владимир Файзулович Файзулин; born 25 November 1952) is a Russian professional football coach and a former player. He is an assistant manager of Rotor Volgograd.

== Playing career ==
As a player, Fayzulin made his debut in 1972 in the Soviet Second League for Barrikady Volgograd.

== Personal life ==
He is an ethnic Tatar.
