= Sergey Timofeev =

Kazakhstani footballer and coach

Sergey Timofeyev
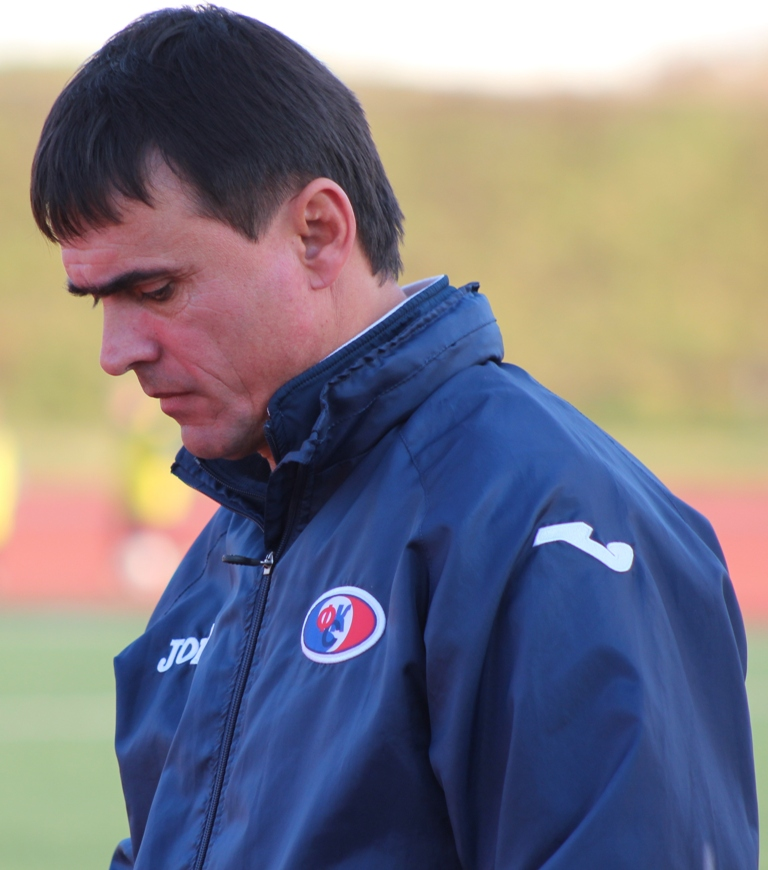

Personal information
- Full name: Sergey Anatolyevich Timofeyev
- Date of birth: 5 March 1965 (age 61)
- Place of birth: Pavlodar, Kazakh SSR, Soviet Union
- Height: 1.77 m (5 ft 10 in)
- Position: Defender

Senior career*
Years	Team	Apps	(Gls)
1982–1984	Traktor Pavlodar		
1985–1990	Kairat Almaty	115	(3)
1990–1991	Spartak Vladikavkaz	34	(1)
1992	Nyva Ternopil	13	(0)
1992–1994	Dynamo Moscow	43	(3)
1995–1997	Alania Vladikavkaz	67	(3)
1998	Lokomotiv Nizhny Novgorod	32	(6)
1999	Sokol Saratov	20	(0)
2000–2001	FC Esil Bogatyr	55	(3)
2002–2003	FC Irtysh Pavlodar	49	(3)
2004	FC Ekibastuzets		

International career
1997–2000	Kazakhstan	5	(0)

Managerial career
- 2004: FC Ekibastuzets
- 2004–05: Kazakhstan
- 2006: FC Rostov (assistant)
- 2007: FC Sodovik Sterlitamak (administrator)
- 2008: FC Lukhovitsy
- 2009: FC MVD Rossii Moscow (assistant)
- 2010: FC Sakhalin Yuzhno-Sakhalinsk
- 2010–2012: FC Mostovik-Primorye Ussuriysk
- 2012–2014: FC Sakhalin Yuzhno-Sakhalinsk
- 2016: FC Altai Semey
- * Club domestic league appearances and goals

Sergey Anatolyevich Timofeyev (Russian: Сергей Анатольевич Тимофеев; born 5 March 1965) is a Kazakhstani professional football coach and a former player.

He played for Kairat Almaty in the Soviet Top League as well as FC Dynamo Moscow and FC Alania Vladikavkaz in the Russian Premier League.

Timofeev made five appearances for the Kazakhstan national football team from 1997 through 1999. He also was the manager of the national team from 2004 to 2005 in World Cup 2006 qualifiers.

== Honours ==
- Russian Premier League champion: 1995.
- Kazakhstan Premier League champion: 2002, 2003.
- Russian Premier League runner-up: 1994, 1996.
- Russian Premier League bronze: 1992, 1993.
- Kazakhstan Premier League bronze: 2000.
- Russian Cup winner: 1995.
