= Sargis Hovhannisyan =

Armenian footballer and manager

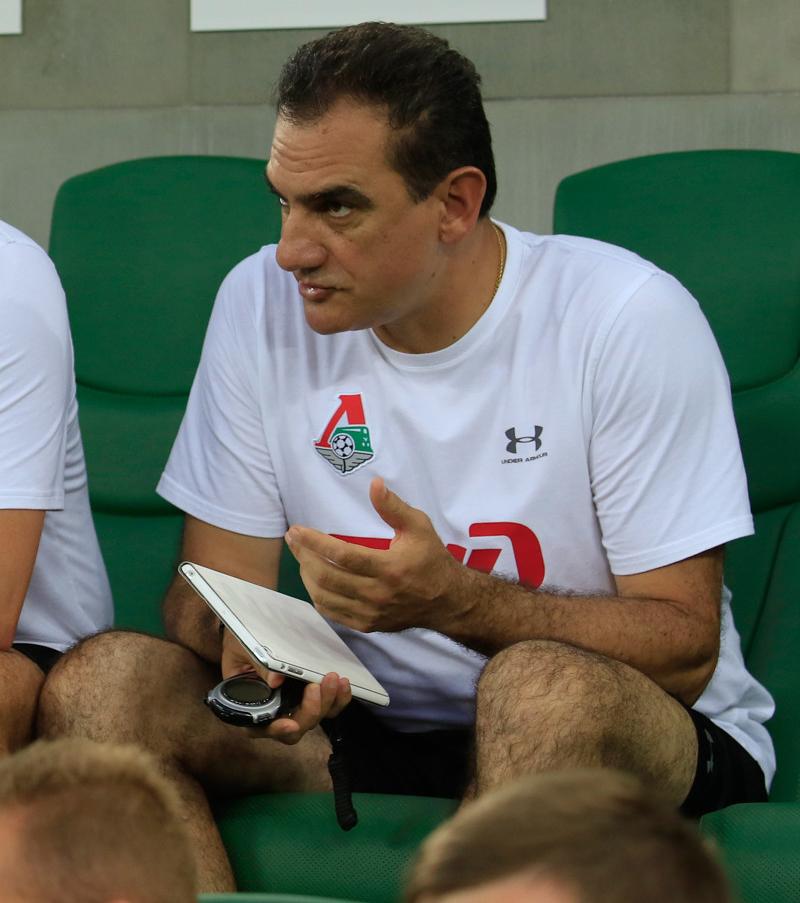
- Hovhannisyan working with Lokomotiv in 2018

Personal information
- Date of birth: 17 August 1968 (age 58)
- Place of birth: Yerevan, Soviet Union
- Height: 1.84 m (6 ft 0 in)
- Position: Defender

Team information
- Current team: FC Lokomotiv Moscow (scout)

Senior career*
Years	Team	Apps	(Gls)
1986–1991	FC Ararat Yerevan	89	(11)
1992–1993	FC Dynamo Moscow	29	(0)
1994–2000	FC Lokomotiv Moscow	115	(10)
2001–2001	FC Rubin Kazan	14	(1)
Total		247	(22)

International career
1994–1999	Armenia	16	(0)

Managerial career
- 2006–2021: FC Lokomotiv Moscow (assistant)
- 2021–: FC Lokomotiv Moscow (scout)
- * Club domestic league appearances and goals

Sargis Hovhannisyan (Armenian: Սարգիս Հովհաննիսյան, born 17 August 1968), is an Armenian football coach and a former defender, who mostly spent his club career at FC Lokomotiv Moscow. He works for Lokomotiv as a scout.

== Life and career ==
Hovhannisyan was born in Yerevan, Soviet Union. He was one of the key defenders of the Armenia national football team, and has participated in 16 international matches since his debut on 7 September 1994, in an away match against Belgium.

== Achievements ==
- Russian Cup with Lokomotiv Moscow: 1995/96, 1996/97, 1999/00, 2000/01
- Russian Cup finalist with Lokomotiv Moscow: 1997/98
- Russian Premier League bronze medals with Lokomotiv Moscow: 1998
- Russian Premier League runner-up with Lokomotiv Moscow: 1999, 2000
