= Igor Kiselyov =

Russian footballer

Personal information
- Full name: Igor Vladimirovich Kiselyov
- Date of birth: 19 August 1979
- Place of birth: Krasnodar, Russian SFSR
- Date of death: 30 December 2014 (aged 35)
- Place of death: Afipsky, Russia
- Height: 1.75 m (5 ft 9 in)
- Position: Forward

Youth career
- SDYuShOR-5 Krasnodar

Senior career*
| Years | Team | Apps | (Gls) |
| 1997–1998 | FC Torpedo Moscow | 1 | (0) |
| 1997–1998 | FC Torpedo-2 Moscow | 58 | (20) |
| 1999–2000 | FC Vagonnik Krasnodar | | |
| 2001 | FC Krasnodar-2000 | 38 | (47) |
| 2002 | FC Kuban Krasnodar | 26 | (5) |
| 2003 | FC Krasnodar-2000 | 23 | (18) |
| 2003 | FC Terek Grozny | 10 | (5) |
| 2004 | FC Kuban Krasnodar | 12 | (2) |
| 2005 | FC Krasnodar-2000 | 7 | (0) |
| 2005 | FC Avangard Kursk | 6 | (1) |
| 2006 | FC Dynamo Stavropol | 16 | (4) |
| 2006 | FC Spartak-UGP Anapa | 11 | (11) |
| 2007 | FC Vityaz Podolsk | 5 | (0) |
| 2007 | FC Druzhba Maykop | 12 | (4) |
| 2008 | FC Dynamo Krasnodar | | |
| 2009 | FC Pontos Vityazevo | | |
| 2010 | FC Biolog Novokubansk | | |
| 2010 | FC Dynamo-Biolog Novokubansk | | |
| 2011 | FC Biolog-Novokubansk Progress | 8 | (1) |
| 2013 | FC Afips Afipsky (amateur) | | |

Managerial career
- 2014: FC Afips-2 Afipsky (assistant)
- * Club domestic league appearances and goals

Igor Vladimirovich Kiselyov (Russian: Игорь Владимирович Киселёв; 19 August 1979 – 30 December 2014) was a Russian professional footballer.

== Club career ==
He made his professional debut in the Russian Premier League in 1997 for FC Torpedo-Luzhniki Moscow.

== Honours ==
- Russian Cup winner: 2004 (played in the early stages of the 2003/04 tournament for FC Terek Grozny).
- Holds the Russian professional football record for most goals scored in one game. He scored 10 goals in 2001 in a Russian Second Division game, a 16–1 victory for FC Krasnodar-2000 over FC Lokomotiv-Taim Mineralnye Vody.
- Russian Second Division Zone South top scorer: 2001 (47 goals).

== Death ==
On 30 December 2014 Kiselev died suddenly, due to acute heart failure, according to preliminary reports.
