= Yevgeni Smertin =

Russian footballer and coach (born 1969)

Personal information
- Full name: Yevgeni Gennadyevich Smertin
- Date of birth: 17 January 1969 (age 57)
- Place of birth: Barnaul, Russia, Soviet Union
- Height: 1.73 m (5 ft 8 in)
- Positions: Midfielder; defender

Senior career*
Years	Team	Apps	(Gls)
1985–1987	FC Dinamo Barnaul	36	(2)
1988–1994	FC Dynamo Moscow	121	(3)
1994–1995	FC Lokomotiv Nizhny Novgorod	26	(4)
1995–1997	FC Torpedo-Luzhniki Moscow	44	(6)
1998	FC Shinnik Yaroslavl	11	(0)
1998–2001	FC Saturn Ramenskoye	86	(4)

Managerial career
- 2002: FC Saturn-RenTV Ramenskoye (reserves)
- 2002: FC Kolomna
- 2003: FC Khimki (assistant)
- 2004: FC Gazovik Orenburg
- 2005: FC Moscow (reserves)
- 2008: FC Dynamo Moscow (youth team)
- * Club domestic league appearances and goals

Yevgeni Gennadyevich Smertin (Russian: Евгений Геннадьевич Смертин; born 17 January 1969) is a former Russian professional footballer and a current football coach.

== Club career ==
He made his debut in the Soviet Top League in 1988 for FC Dynamo Moscow.

== Personal life ==
He is the older brother of Alexei Smertin.

== Honours ==
- Russian Premier League runner-up: 1994.
- Russian Premier League bronze: 1992, 1993.
- Soviet Top League bronze: 1990.

== European club competitions ==
- UEFA Cup 1991–92 with FC Dynamo Moscow: 5 games.
- UEFA Cup 1992–93 with FC Dynamo Moscow: 5 games.
- UEFA Cup 1993–94 with FC Dynamo Moscow: 2 games.
- UEFA Cup 1996–97 with FC Torpedo-Luzhniki Moscow: 2 games.
