= 1996 in Russian football =

1996 season

1996 in Russian football returned the fifth national title to Spartak Moscow, while the Russian Cup was taken by Lokomotiv Moscow.

== Club competitions ==
FC Spartak Moscow won the title for the fourth time.

For more details, see:

- 1996 Russian Top League
- 1996 Russian First League
- 1996 Russian Second League
- 1996 Russian Third League

== Cup competitions ==
The fourth edition of the Russian Cup, 1995–96 Russian Cup was won by FC Lokomotiv Moscow, who beat FC Spartak Moscow in the finals with a score of 3–2.

Early stages of the 1996–97 Russian Cup were played later in the year.

== European club competitions ==
=== 1995–96 UEFA Champions League ===
FC Spartak Moscow was knocked out in the quarterfinals.

Several key players (Stanislav Cherchesov, Viktor Onopko, Vasili Kulkov and Sergei Yuran) who played in the group stage where Spartak did not lose a single point left the club to move to Western European clubs in the winter before the quarterfinals.

Nicolas Ouédec was instrumental again, after scoring 7 goals in 4 games against the Russian teams in the 1994–95 UEFA Cup, this time he scored 3 goals in two games against Spartak.

- March 6, 1996 / Quarterfinals, First Leg / FC Nantes - FC Spartak Moscow 2-0 (N'Doram 28' Ouédec 69' Pedros (red card) 77' ) / Nantes, Stade de la Beaujoire / Attendance: 32,500

FC Spartak Moscow: Nigmatullin, Lipko, Nikiforov, Tsymbalar (Shmarov, 46), Mamedov (Chudin, 35), Ananko, Piatnitski (captain), Alenichev (Bezrodny, 72), Evseev, Kechinov, Tikhonov.

- March 20, 1996 / Quarterfinals, Return Leg / FC Spartak Moscow - FC Nantes 2-2 (Nikiforov 33' 39' - Ouédec 63' 86') / Moscow, Lokomotiv Stadium / Attendance: 22,000

FC Spartak Moscow: Nigmatullin, Ananko, Nikiforov (captain), Tsymbalar, Evseev, Lipko, Serhiy Nahornyak (Bezrodny, 75), Alenichev, Shmarov (Piatnitski, 60), Kechinov, Tikhonov.

=== 1995–96 UEFA Cup Winners' Cup ===
FC Dynamo Moscow were eliminated in the quarterfinals.

- March 7, 1996 / FC Dynamo Moscow - SK Rapid Wien 0-1 (Stumpf 35') / Moscow, Lokomotiv Stadium / Attendance: 8,300

FC Dynamo Moscow: Smetanin (captain), Yakhimovich, Kovtun, Shulgin (Kutsenko, 63), Nekrasov, Kobelev, Samatov, Cheryshev (Tishkov, 40), Safronov (A. Grishin, 39), Kuznetsov, Teryokhin.

- March 21, 1996 / SK Rapid Wien - FC Dynamo Moscow 3-0 (Jancker 49' 74' Stöger 63' (pen.) - Cheryshev (red card) 29' Teryokhin (red card) 82') / Vienna, Ernst-Happel-Stadion / Attendance: 44,000

FC Dynamo Moscow: Smetanin (captain), Yakhimovich, Kovtun, Shulgin (Safronov, 59), Nekrasov, Kobelev, Samatov (Lemeshko, 65), Cheryshev, A. Grishin (Tishkov, 56), Podpaly, Teryokhin.

=== 1995–96 UEFA Cup ===
All the Russian teams were eliminated in 1995.

=== 1996–97 UEFA Champions League ===
FC Alania Vladikavkaz was knocked out in the qualifying round.

- August 7, 1996 / Qualifying Round, First Leg / Rangers F.C. - FC Alania Vladikavkaz 3-1 (McInnes 51' McCoist 60' Petrić 80' - Yanovskiy 29') Yanovskiy missed the goal from a penalty kick in the 81st minute / Glasgow, Ibrox Stadium / Attendance: 42,000

FC Alania Vladikavkaz: Kramarenko, Revishvili (Botsiyev, 40), Pagayev, Kornienko, I. Dzhioyev (captain), Tetradze, Tedeyev, Yanovskiy, Qosimov (Skysh, 65), Agayev, Suleymanov (Sergeyev, 77).

- August 21, 1996 / Qualifying Round, Return Leg / FC Alania Vladikavkaz - Rangers F.C. 2-7 (Yanovskiy 15' Suleymanov 23' (pen.) - McCoist 1' 14' 18' van Vossen 40' Laudrup 56' 83' Miller 87') / Vladikavkaz, Republican Spartak Stadium / Attendance: 37,000

FC Alania Vladikavkaz: Khapov, Revishvili, Timofeev, Shelia, I. Dzhioyev (captain), Tetradze, Tedeyev (Agayev, 28, Sergeyev, 57), Yanovskiy, Kornienko (Skysh, 79), Kanishchev, Suleymanov.

=== 1996–97 UEFA Cup Winners' Cup ===
FC Lokomotiv Moscow went out in the second round.

- September 12, 1996 / First round, first leg / FC Lokomotiv Moscow – NK Varteks 1–0 (Cherevchenko 12') / Moscow, Lokomotiv Stadium / Attendance: 1,500

FC Lokomotiv Moscow: Ovchinnikov, Cherevchenko (Arifullin, 86), Drozdov, Kharlachyov, Pashinin, Chugainov, Kosolapov (captain), Gurenko, Janashia, Elyshev, Garin (Snigiryov, 55, Maminov, 73).

- September 26, 1996 / First round, second leg / NK Varteks – FC Lokomotiv Moscow 2–1 (Vugrinec 62' 79' – Kosolapov 41') / Varaždin, Stadion Varteks / Attendance: 3,000

FC Lokomotiv Moscow: Ovchinnikov, Cherevchenko, Pashinin, Solomatin, Hovhannisyan, Chugainov, Kosolapov (captain), Gurenko, Janashia (Snigiryov, 80), Maminov (Drozdov, 86), Haras (Elyshev, 63).

- October 17, 1996 / Second round, first leg / S.L. Benfica – FC Lokomotiv Moscow 1–0 (João Pinto 8') / Lisbon, Estádio da Luz / Attendance: 10,000

FC Lokomotiv Moscow: Ovchinnikov, Cherevchenko, Drozdov, Kharlachyov, Hovhannisyan, Chugainov, Kosolapov (captain), Gurenko, Pashinin, Maminov (Smirnov, 59), Haras (Veselov, 70).

- October 31, 1996 / Second round, second leg / FC Lokomotiv Moscow – S.L. Benfica 2–3 (Solomatin 8' Haras 59' – Panduru 48' Donizete 63' João Pinto 89') / Moscow, Lokomotiv Stadium / Attendance: 7,000

FC Lokomotiv Moscow: Ovchinnikov, Cherevchenko, Drozdov, Kharlachyov, Pashinin, Chugainov, Kosolapov (captain), Gurenko, Solomatin, Maminov, Haras (Veselov, 76).

=== 1996–97 UEFA Cup ===
PFC CSKA Moscow, FC Dynamo Moscow and FC Torpedo-Luzhniki Moscow were eliminated in the first round after going through the qualifying round. FC Alania Vladikavkaz went out in the first round after going to the UEFA Cup after failing in the qualification for the Champions League. FC Spartak Moscow went out in the second round.

- August 6, 1996 / Qualifying Round, First Leg / ÍA - PFC CSKA Moscow 0-2 (Karsakov 34' Jankauskas 37') / Akranes, Akranesvöllur / Attendance: 1,100

PFC CSKA Moscow: Tyapushkin, Shutov (Ulyanov, 46), Khokhlov, Mashkarin, Samaroni, Bushmanov, Semak (captain), Karsakov (Gerasimov, 60), Minko, Leonidas (Pervushin, 79), Jankauskas.

- August 6, 1996 / Qualifying Round, First Leg / FC Dynamo Moscow - FC Jazz Pori 1-1 (Kobelev 15' - Laaksonen 38') / Moscow, Dynamo Stadium / Attendance: 2,500

FC Dynamo Moscow: Smetanin (captain), Yakhimovich, Kovtun, Kolotovkin, Shtanyuk, Kobelev, S. Grishin, Tishkov, Kuznetsov, A. Grishin, Artyomov (R. Gusev, 33).

- August 6, 1996 / Qualifying Round, First Leg / NK Croatia Zagreb - FC Spartak Moscow 3-1 (Slišković 5' I. Cvitanović 71' Šarić 78' - Evseev 44') / Zagreb, Maksimir Stadium / Attendance: 15,000

FC Spartak Moscow: Filimonov, Ananko, Gorlukovich (captain), Evseev, Mamedov (Duyun, 76), Kovalenko (Dzhubanov, 46), Melyoshin (Konovalov, 66), Alenichev, Titov, Kechinov, Tikhonov.

- August 6, 1996 / Qualifying Round, First Leg / HNK Hajduk Split - FC Torpedo Moscow 1-0 (Leonchenko 49' (o.g)) / Split, Gradski stadion u Poljudu / Attendance: 20,000

FC Torpedo Moscow: Pchelnikov, Vostrosablin (captain), Makhmutov, Leonchenko (Savelyev, 72), Kornaukhov (Borodkin, 59), Krukovets (Burchenkov, 46), Nikolayev, Prokopenko, Kamnev, Avakov, Agashkov.

- August 20, 1996 / Qualifying Round, Return Leg / PFC CSKA Moscow - ÍA 4-1 (Movsisyan 33' 40' Leonidas 50' Jankauskas 58' - Högnason 79') / Moscow, Dynamo Stadium / Attendance: 3,000

PFC CSKA Moscow: Tyapushkin (Goncharov, 62), Samaroni, Khokhlov, Mashkarin, Gashkin, Pervushin, Semak (captain), Gerasimov (Movsisyan, 28), Minko (Tereškinas, 46), Leonidas, Jankauskas.

- August 20, 1996 / Qualifying Round, Return Leg / FC Jazz Pori - FC Dynamo Moscow 1-3 (Levo-Jokimaki 41' Rantanen (red card) 60' - Kobelev 60' (pen.) Artyomov 68' 82') / Pori, Porin Stadion / Attendance: 9,500

FC Dynamo Moscow: Smetanin (captain), Yakhimovich, Kovtun, Kolotovkin, Shtanyuk, Kobelev (Gushchin, 80), S. Grishin, Tishkov, R. Gusev, A. Grishin (Artyomov, 54), Tochilin (Nekrasov, 73).

- August 20, 1996 / Qualifying Round, Return Leg / FC Spartak Moscow - NK Croatia Zagreb 2-0 (Melyoshin 28' Alenichev 56') / Moscow, Lokomotiv Stadium / Attendance: 18,000

FC Spartak Moscow: Filimonov, Duyun, Gorlukovich (captain), Evseev (Ananko, 73), Mamedov, Shirko, Melyoshin, Alenichev, Titov (Dzhubanov, 54), Kechinov, Tikhonov.

- August 20, 1996 / Qualifying Round, Return Leg / FC Torpedo-Luzhniki Moscow (renamed from FC Torpedo) - HNK Hajduk Split 2-0 (Kamoltsev 17' Vostrosablin 82' (pen.)) / Moscow, Torpedo Stadium / Attendance: 6,800

FC Torpedo-Luzhniki Moscow: Pchelnikov, Vostrosablin (captain), Makhmutov, Leonchenko, Kornaukhov (Murashov, 39), Borodkin, Savelyev, Kamoltsev, Kamnev (Pazemov, 57), Avakov (Prokopenko, 76), Agashkov.

- September 10, 1996 / First Round, First Leg / PFC CSKA Moscow - Feyenoord 0-1 (van Wonderen 82') / Moscow, Dynamo Stadium / Attendance: 6,000

PFC CSKA Moscow: Tyapushkin, Samaroni, Shutov, Mashkarin, Ivanov, Bushmanov, Semak (captain), Gerasimov, Minko, Leonidas (Pervushin, 62), Jankauskas.

- September 10, 1996 / First Round, First Leg / A.S. Roma - FC Dynamo Moscow 3-0 (Tommasi 7' Fonseca 18' 40' (pen.)) / Rome, Stadio Olimpico / Attendance: 60,000

FC Dynamo Moscow: Smetanin (captain), Yakhimovich, Nekrasov, Kolotovkin, Shtanyuk, Kobelev, S. Grishin, Cheryshev, Kuznetsov (R. Gusev, 67), A. Grishin, Tochilin (Tishkov, 24).

- September 10, 1996 / First Round, First Leg / FC Spartak Moscow - Silkeborg IF 3-2 (Tikhonov 14' 37' Kechinov 20' Nigmatullin (red card) 89' - Thygesen 53' Reese 72') / Moscow, Lokomotiv Stadium / Attendance: 10,000

FC Spartak Moscow: Nigmatullin, Evseev, Gorlukovich, Tsymbalar (captain), Mamedov (Ananko, 82), Shirko (Duyun, 57), Golovskoy, Alenichev (Bezrodny, 78), Titov, Kechinov, Tikhonov.

- September 10, 1996 / First Round, First Leg / FC Torpedo-Luzhniki Moscow - FC Dinamo Tbilisi 0-1 (Jamarauli 35') / Moscow, Torpedo Stadium / Attendance: 7,300

FC Torpedo-Luzhniki Moscow: Pchelnikov, Vostrosablin (captain), Makhmutov, Leonchenko, Kornaukhov, Nikolayev (Burchenkov, 46), Smertin (Savelyev, 51), Kamoltsev, Kamnev, Avakov, Agashkov (Prokopenko, 65).

- September 10, 1996 / First Round, First Leg / FC Alania Vladikavkaz - R.S.C. Anderlecht 2-1 (Yanovskiy 19' Shelia 48' - Pagayev 3' (o.g)) / Vladikavkaz, Republican Spartak Stadium / Attendance: 37,000

FC Alania Vladikavkaz: Khapov, Kornienko (Revishvili, 59, Bitarov, 65), Timofeev, Shelia, Pagayev, Tetradze, Tedeyev (captain) (Sergeyev, 79), Yanovskiy, Agayev, Kanishchev, Suleymanov.

- September 24, 1996 / First Round, Return Leg / Feyenoord - PFC CSKA Moscow 1-1 (van Wonderen 72' - Minko 57') / Rotterdam, De Kuip / Attendance: 35,000

PFC CSKA Moscow: Tyapushkin, Samaroni (Shutov, 75), Khokhlov, Mashkarin, Ivanov, Bushmanov, Semak (captain), Gashkin (Leonidas, 46), Minko, Jankauskas, Gerasimov.

- September 24, 1996 / First Round, Return Leg / FC Dynamo Moscow - A.S. Roma 1-3 (Kobelev 19' (pen.) - Fonseca 45' (pen.) Tommasi 71' Berretta 77') / Moscow, Dynamo Stadium / Attendance: 5,000

FC Dynamo Moscow: Kleimyonov, Dyomin, Kovtun, Kolotovkin, Gushchin (R. Gusev, 46), Kobelev (captain) (Nekrasov, 46), S. Grishin, Cheryshev, Kuznetsov (Kutsenko, 46), A. Grishin, Teryokhin.

- September 24, 1996 / First Round, Return Leg / Silkeborg IF - FC Spartak Moscow 1-2 (Thygesen 31' - Tikhonov 42' Sønksen 51' (o.g)) / Silkeborg, Silkeborg Stadion / Attendance: 10,000

FC Spartak Moscow: Filimonov, Ananko, Gorlukovich, Tsymbalar (captain), Mamedov, Shirko, Golovskoy, Alenichev (Dzhubanov, 55), Titov (Duyun, 70), Kechinov, Tikhonov.

- September 24, 1996 / First Round, Return Leg / FC Dinamo Tbilisi - FC Torpedo-Luzhniki Moscow 1-1 (Jamarauli 49' - Vostrosablin 82') / Tbilisi, Boris Paichadze Stadium / Attendance: 65,000

FC Torpedo-Luzhniki Moscow: Pchelnikov, Vostrosablin (captain), Makhmutov, Leonchenko, Burchenkov (Pazemov, 70), Borodkin, Smertin (Nikolayev, 51), Kamoltsev (Prokopenko, 51), Kamnev, Savelyev, Agashkov.

- September 24, 1996 / R.S.C. Anderlecht - FC Alania Vladikavkaz 4-0 (Johnson 28' De Bilde 39' Zetterberg 63' 68') / Brussels, Constant Vanden Stock Stadium / Attendance: 24,000

FC Alania Vladikavkaz: Khapov, Kornienko, Timofeev, Shelia, I. Dzhioyev (captain) (Suleymanov, 59), Tetradze, Tedeyev, Yanovskiy, Agayev (Datdeyev, 64), Kanishchev, Derkach (Sergeyev, 32).

- October 16, 1996 / Second Round, First Leg / Hamburger SV - FC Spartak Moscow 3-0 (Breitenreiter 8' Bäron 38' Kovačević 58') / (Hamburg, Volksparkstadion) / Attendance: 17,347

FC Spartak Moscow: Nigmatullin, Ananko, Gorlukovich, Tsymbalar (captain), Mamedov, Evseev, Golovskoy (Titov, 27), Alenichev, Melyoshin (Shirko, 75), Kechinov (Bezrodny, 45), Tikhonov.

- October 29, 1996 / Second Round, Second Leg / FC Spartak Moscow - Hamburger SV 2-2 (Melyoshin 10' Tikhonov 42' (pen.) - Schupp 29' Hartmann 72') / Moscow, Lokomotiv Stadium / Attendance: 10,000

FC Spartak Moscow: Filimonov, Ananko, Gorlukovich (captain), Evseev (Dzhubanov, 35), Lipko (Golovskoy, 67), Duyun, Melyoshin (Bezrodny, 61), Alenichev, Titov, Shirko, Tikhonov.

=== 1996 UEFA Intertoto Cup ===
Russian clubs participated in the Intertoto Cup for the first time. FC Rotor Volgograd, FC KAMAZ-Chally Naberezhnye Chelny and FC Uralmash Yekaterinburg all won their groups. Uralmash and KAMAZ lost in the semifinals and Rotor lost on away goals in the finals, not qualifying for the UEFA Cup.

- June 22, 1996 / Group 7, Day 1 / FC Ataka Minsk - FC Rotor Volgograd 0-4 (Abramov 41' Veretennikov 61' 63' Orbu 69') / City Stadium, Molodechno / Attendance: 2,500

FC Rotor Volgograd: Samorukov, Shmarko, Burlachenko (Potylchak, 46), Tishchenko, Zhabchenko, Borzenkov (Zernov, 46), Korniyets, Abramov, Veretennikov (captain), Yesipov, Orbu (Ilyushin, 83).

- June 22, 1996 / Group 8, Day 1 / FC KAMAZ-Chally Naberezhnye Chelny - ŁKS Łódź 3-0 (Klontsak 58' Yevdokimov 64' (pen.) Babenko 67') / Naberezhnye Chelny, KAMAZ stadium / Attendance: 5,000

FC KAMAZ-Chally Naberezhnye Chelny: Zakharchuk, Yugrin (Vinnikov, 55), Yefremov (Al-Shebat, 84), Klontsak, Aleksanenkov, Al-Shaqran, Baryshev (Prygunov, 72), Zubkov, Yevdokimov (captain), Babenko, Jishkariani.

- June 23, 1996 / Group 11, Day 1 / Hibernians F.C. - FC Uralmash Yekaterinburg 1-2 (Crawley 86' - Yamlikhanov 46' Khankeyev 80') / Paola, Hibernians Ground / Attendance: 2,000

FC Uralmash Yekaterinburg: Shukhovtsev, Fedotov (captain), Ratnichkin, Bakunin, Bluzhin, Yamlikhanov, Bakhtin (Danilov, 46), Khankeyev (Vasikov, 89), Perednya (Kokarev, 70), Osinov, Mochulyak.

- June 29, 1996 / Group 8, Day 2 / FC Kaučuk Opava - FC KAMAZ-Chally Naberezhnye Chelny 1-2 (Rozhon 64' - Babenko 48' Klontsak 70' Aleksanenkov (red card) 89') / Ostrava, Nová huť Stadium / Attendance: 3,000

FC KAMAZ-Chally Naberezhnye Chelny: Zakharchuk, Yugrin, Yefremov, Klontsak, Aleksanenkov, Al-Shaqran (Vinnikov, 87), Baryshev (Varlamov, 46), Zubkov, Yevdokimov (captain), Babenko, Jishkariani.

- July 6, 1996 / Group 7, Day 3 / FC Rotor Volgograd - FC Shakhtar Donetsk 4-1 (Zernov 7' Abramov 48' Veretennikov 59' 89' - Kovalyov 44') / Volgograd, Central Stadium / Attendance: 15,000

FC Rotor Volgograd: Samorukov, Shmarko, Zhabchenko (Zhunenko, 46), Tishchenko, Berketov, Borzenkov, Orbu (Korniyets, 46), Abramov, Veretennikov (captain), Yesipov, Zernov (Niederhaus, 59).

- July 6, 1996 / Group 11, Day 3 / FC Uralmash Yekaterinburg - PFC CSKA Sofia 2-1 (Litvinov 34' 58' - Slavchev 23') / Yekaterinburg, Central Stadium / Attendance: 4,000

FC Uralmash Yekaterinburg: Shukhovtsev, Fedotov (captain), Morozov, Litvinov, Reshetnikov, Yamlikhanov, Bakhtin, Danilov, Perednya (Vasikov, 87), Osinov, Mochulyak.

- July 13, 1996 / Group 8, Day 4 / FC KAMAZ-Chally Naberezhnye Chelny - PFC Spartak Varna 2-2 (Zayarnyi 61' Vinnikov 63' - Stanchev 9' Todorov 45') / Naberezhnye Chelny, KAMAZ stadium / Attendance: 6,000

FC KAMAZ-Chally Naberezhnye Chelny: Zakharchuk, Varlamov, Yefremov, Klontsak, Yugrin (Tropanet, 46), Zayarnyi, Baryshev (Prygunov, 78), Zubkov, Yevdokimov (captain), Babenko, Jishkariani (Vinnikov, 60).

- July 13, 1996 / Group 11, Day 4 / RC Strasbourg - FC Uralmash Yekaterinburg 1-1 (Baticle 35' Bruno Rodriguez (yellow card) 85' (yellow-red card) - Litvinov 41') / Strasbourg, Stade de la Meinau / Attendance: 8,000

FC Uralmash Yekaterinburg: Armishev, Fedotov (captain), Morozov, Litvinov, Bakunin, Yamlikhanov, Osinov, Danilov (Bakhtin, 46), Perednya, Romaschenko (Ratnichkin, 68), Mochulyak (Kokarev, 74).

- July 14, 1996 / Group 7, Day 4 / Antalyaspor - FC Rotor Volgograd 2-1 (Kona 14' Khuse 22' - Veretennikov 70' Berketov (red card) 90') / Isparta, Isparta Atatürk Stadium / Attendance: 6,000

FC Rotor Volgograd: Samorukov, Shmarko, Zhunenko (Orbu, 60), Tishchenko, Berketov, Borzenkov, Korniyets, Niederhaus (Zhabchenko, 72), Veretennikov (captain), Yesipov, Abramov (Zernov, 55).

- July 20, 1996 / Group 7, Day 5 / FC Rotor Volgograd - FC Basel 3-2 (Niederhaus 18' Yesipov 38' Veretennikov 57' - Orlando 28' Giallanza 29') / Volgograd, Central Stadium / Attendance: 20,000

FC Rotor Volgograd: Samorukov, Zhunenko, Burlachenko, Tishchenko, Zhabchenko (Zernov, 46), Borzenkov, Korniyets, Niederhaus (Ilyushin, 75), Veretennikov (captain), Yesipov, Orbu (Abramov, 68).

- July 20, 1996 / Group 8, Day 5 / TSV 1860 München - FC KAMAZ-Chally Naberezhnye Chelny 0-1 (Jishkariani 70') / Munich, Grünwalder Stadion / Attendance: 20,600

FC KAMAZ-Chally Naberezhnye Chelny: Zakharchuk, Varlamov, Yefremov, Klontsak, Yugrin, Zayarnyi (Baryshev, 87), Tropanet, Zubkov, Yevdokimov (captain), Prygunov, Jishkariani.

- July 20, 1996 / Group 11, Day 5 / FC Uralmash Yekaterinburg - Kocaelispor 2-0 (Osinov 2' Kokarev 56') / Yekaterinburg, Central Stadium / Attendance: 3,000

FC Uralmash Yekaterinburg: Armishev, Fedotov (captain), Ratnichkin, Litvinov (Bluzhin, 78), Bakunin, Yamlikhanov, Osinov, Danilov (Khankeyev, 46), Perednya, Romaschenko (Bakhtin, 73), Kokarev.

- July 27, 1996 / Semi-finals, First Leg / LASK Linz - FC Rotor Volgograd 2-2 (Westerthaler 1' Duspara 60' - Veretennikov 25' 29' Yesipov (red card) 73') / Linz, Linzer Stadion / Attendance: 5,000

FC Rotor Volgograd: Samorukov, Shmarko, Burlachenko, Tishchenko, Zernov (Abramov, 65), Borzenkov, Korniyets, Niederhaus (Zhabchenko, 82), Veretennikov (captain), Yesipov, Orbu (Zhunenko, 70).

- July 27, 1996 / Semi-finals, First Leg / FC KAMAZ-Chally Naberezhnye Chelny - Guingamp 2-0 (Babenko 33' Zayarnyi 45') / Naberezhnye Chelny, KAMAZ stadium / Attendance: 8,000

FC KAMAZ-Chally Naberezhnye Chelny: Zakharchuk, Varlamov, Yefremov, Klontsak, Yugrin, Zayarnyi, Tropanet, Zubkov, Yevdokimov (captain) (Baryshev, 83), Babenko (Tikhonov, 79), Jishkariani (Prygunov, 64).

- July 27, 1996 / Semi-finals, First Leg / FC Uralmash Yekaterinburg - Silkeborg IF 1-2 (Bakhtin 15' - Bruun 17' Knudsen 18') / Yekaterinburg, Central Stadium / Attendance: 5,500

FC Uralmash Yekaterinburg: Armishev, Fedotov (captain), Ratnichkin, Litvinov, Bakunin (Bluzhin, 63), Yamlikhanov (Danilov, 71), Osinov, Khankeyev, Bakhtin, Romaschenko (Perednya, 51), Kokarev.

- July 31, 1996 / Semi-finals, Return Leg / FC Rotor Volgograd - LASK Linz 5-0 (Berketov 40' Veretennikov 42' 86' Zernov 54' Abramov 72') / Volgograd, Central Stadium / Attendance: 22,000

FC Rotor Volgograd: Samorukov (Karimov, 58), Zhabchenko (Zhunenko, 61), Burlachenko, Tishchenko, Berketov, Borzenkov, Korniyets, Abramov, Veretennikov (captain), Zernov (Gerashchenko, 68), Orbu.

- July 31, 1996 / Semi-finals, Return Leg / Guingamp - FC KAMAZ-Chally Naberezhnye Chelny 4-0 (a.e.t.) (Assadourian 75' Carnot 88' Horlaville 97' Moreira 105') / Guingamp, Stade du Roudourou / Attendance: 4,615

FC KAMAZ-Chally Naberezhnye Chelny: Zakharchuk, Varlamov, Yefremov, Klontsak, Prygunov (Vinnikov, 105), Zayarnyi, Tropanet (Al-Shaqran, 33), Zubkov, Yevdokimov (captain), Babenko, Jishkariani (Baryshev, 86).

- July 31, 1996 / Semi-finals, Return Leg / Silkeborg IF - FC Uralmash Yekaterinburg 0-1 (Khankeyev 90' (pen.) Romaschenko (red card) 37') / Silkeborg, Silkeborg Stadion / Attendance: 12,000

FC Uralmash Yekaterinburg: Shukhovtsev, Fedotov (captain), Morozov, Litvinov, Bluzhin, Danilov (Vasikov, 65), Osinov (Bakunin, 81), Khankeyev, Perednya, Romaschenko, Kokarev (Ratnichkin, 70).

- August 6, 1996 / Finals, First Leg / FC Rotor Volgograd - Guingamp 2-1 (Zernov 53' Tishchenko 80' - Horlaville 45') / Volgograd, Central Stadium / Attendance: 29,000

FC Rotor Volgograd: Samorukov, Shmarko, Abramov (Zhabchenko, 61), Tishchenko, Berketov, Borzenkov, Korniyets, Niederhaus (Gerashchenko, 84), Veretennikov (captain), Zernov (Ilyushin, 74), Orbu.

- August 20, 1996 / Finals, Return Leg / Guingamp - FC Rotor Volgograd 1-0 (Carnot 76') / Guingamp, Stade du Roudourou / Attendance: 10,000

FC Rotor Volgograd: Samorukov, Shmarko, Gerashchenko (captain), Tishchenko (Burlachenko, 46), Berketov, Borzenkov, Korniyets (Zhunenko, 70), Niederhaus, Veretennikov, Yesipov, Zernov (Abramov, 64).

== National team ==
Russia national football team participated in the UEFA Euro 1996, coming last in their group with 1 point and not qualifying for the quarterfinals. Oleg Romantsev was the manager up to and including the Euro, with Aleksandr Tarkhanov and Boris Ignatyev assisting. After the Euro Boris Ignatyev became the manager, with Aleksandr Tarkhanov and Yuri Syomin assisting.

- February 7, 1996 / Rothmans Cup / Malta - Russia 0-2 (Karpin 26' Kiriakov 61' / Ta' Qali, Ta' Qali National Stadium / Attendance: 2,000

Russia: Cherchesov, Mamedov, Nikiforov, Shalimov, Kovtun, Karpin, Onopko (captain), Tikhonov (Beschastnykh, 46), Mostovoi, Yuran, Kiriakov.

- February 9, 1996 / Rothmans Cup / Iceland - Russia 0-3 (Kanchelskis 12' Karpin 63' 65') / Ta' Qali, Ta' Qali National Stadium / Attendance: 1,000

Russia: Kharine, Radimov, Nikiforov (Chugainov, 76), Tetradze, Kovtun (Kanchelskis, 10), Karpin, Onopko (captain) (Bushmanov, 46), Beschastnykh, Mostovoi (Simutenkov, 46), Dobrovolski (Alenichev, 76), Radchenko.

- February 11, 1996 / Rothmans Cup / Slovenia - Russia 1-3 (Gliha 89' (pen.) - Simutenkov 13' 73' Alenichev 18') / Ta' Qali, Ta' Qali National Stadium / Attendance: 4,000

Russia: Cherchesov (Kharine, 46), Radimov (Mamedov, 70), Nikiforov (captain), Tetradze, Bushmanov (Chugainov, 78), Kanchelskis, Alenichev, Beschastnykh (Tikhonov, 78), Kechinov, Simutenkov, Radchenko.

- March 27, 1996 / Friendly / Ireland - Russia 0-2 (Keane (red card) 89' - Mostovoi 34' Kolyvanov 53') / Dublin, Lansdowne Road / Attendance: 47,000

Russia: Cherchesov, Radimov (Tetradze, 46), Nikiforov, Tsymbalar (Radchenko, 46), Kovtun, Karpin, Onopko (captain), Kanchelskis, Kolyvanov (Shalimov, 70), Mostovoi, Kiriakov (Simutenkov, 66).

- April 24, 1996 / Friendly / Belgium - Russia 0-0 / Brussels, King Baudouin Stadium / Attendance: 16,000

Russia: Cherchesov (Kharine, 46), Kanchelskis, Nikiforov, Onopko (captain), Kovtun, Karpin, Radimov, Mostovoi, Beschastnykh, Kolyvanov (Simutenkov, 79), Kiriakov (Radchenko, 69).

- May 24, 1996 / Friendly / Qatar - Russia 2-5 (Mubarak Mustafa 53' (pen.) Abdulaziz Hassan 89' - Kiriakov 2' 58' Kanchelskis 5' Kolyvanov 27' Mostovoi 78' Nikiforov (red card) 88') / Doha, Khalifa International Stadium / Attendance: 2,500

Russia: Kharine (Ovchinnikov, 85), Gorlukovich, Nikiforov, Tsymbalar (Dobrovolski, 46), Tetradze, Karpin (Shalimov, 59), Onopko (captain) (Bushmanov, 69), Kanchelskis, Kolyvanov (Yuran, 46), Mostovoi, Kiriakov.

- May 29, 1996 / Friendly / Russia - UAE 1-0 (Simutenkov 84') / Moscow, Dynamo Stadium / Attendance: 5,500

Russia: Cherchesov, Radimov, Tetradze, Tsymbalar (Simutenkov, 68), Kovtun, Karpin, Onopko (captain), Kanchelskis (Dobrovolski, 46), Kolyvanov, Yanovskiy, Kiriakov.

- June 2, 1996 / Friendly / Russia - Poland 2-0 (Kovtun 21' Beschastnykh 73') / Moscow, Dynamo Stadium / Attendance: 15,000

Russia: Kharine, Radimov (Shalimov, 86), Tetradze, Tsymbalar (Dobrovolski, 58), Kovtun, Karpin, Onopko (captain) (Nikiforov, 46), Kanchelskis, Kolyvanov (Simutenkov, 46), Yanovskiy, Kiriakov (Beschastnykh, 46).

- June 11, 1996 / UEFA Euro 1996, First Round, Group C / Italy - Russia 2-1 (Casiraghi 5' 52' - Tsymbalar 21' / Liverpool, Anfield / Attendance: 35,120

Russia: Cherchesov, Tetradze, Bushmanov (Yanovskiy, 46), Onopko (captain), Kovtun, Kanchelskis, Karpin (Kiriakov, 63), Mostovoi, Tsymbalar (Dobrovolski, 71), Kolyvanov, Radimov.

- June 16, 1996 / UEFA Euro 1996, First Round, Group C / Russia - Germany 0-3 (Kovtun (red card) 71' - Sammer 56' Klinsmann 77' 90') / Manchester, Old Trafford / Attendance: 50,760

Russia: Kharine, Tetradze, Nikiforov, Tsymbalar, Kovtun, Onopko (captain), Kanchelskis, Kolyvanov, Mostovoi, Radimov (Karpin, 46), Khokhlov (Simutenkov, 66).

- June 19, 1996 / UEFA Euro 1996, First Round, Group C / Russia - Czech Republic 3-3 (Mostovoi 49' Tetradze 54' Beschastnykh 84' - Suchopárek 6' Kuka 19' Šmicer 88') / Liverpool, Anfield / Attendance: 21,128

Russia: Cherchesov, Tetradze, Nikiforov, Gorlukovich, Tsymbalar (Shalimov, 67), Karpin (captain), Yanovskiy, Radimov, Khokhlov, Kolyvanov (Beschastnykh, 46), Simutenkov (Mostovoi, 46).

- August 28, 1996 / Friendly / Russia - Brazil 2-2 (Nikiforov 18' (pen.) Radimov 80' Onopko (red card) 84' - Donizete 47' Ronaldo 85' (pen.) Cafu (yellow card) 76' (red card) ) / Moscow, Dynamo Stadium / Attendance: 25,000

Russia: Cherchesov, Mamedov, Nikiforov, Tikhonov (Kharlachyov, 63), Ternavski, Tetradze, Onopko (captain), Kanchelskis, Veretennikov (Radimov, 15), Kolyvanov (Kechinov, 77), Radchenko (Beschastnykh, 66).

- September 1, 1996 / 1998 FIFA World Cup qualifier / Russia - Cyprus 4-0 (Nikiforov 7' 50' Kolyvanov 34' Beschastnykh 82') / Moscow, Dynamo Stadium / Attendance: 8,500

Russia: Cherchesov, Mamedov, Nikiforov, Onopko (captain), Ternavski, Kanchelskis, Radimov (Kharlachyov, 66), Tetradze, Beschastnykh, Kolyvanov (Tikhonov, 60), Radchenko (Kanishchev, 46).

- October 9, 1996 / 1998 FIFA World Cup qualifier / Israel - Russia 1-1 (G. Brumer 63' - Kolyvanov 80') / Ramat Gan, Ramat Gan Stadium / Attendance: 48,000

Russia: Cherchesov, Minko, Nikiforov, Bushmanov (Radimov, 67), Karpin, Tetradze, Onopko (captain), Kanchelskis, Beschastnykh, Kolyvanov, Radchenko (Tikhonov, 46).

- November 10, 1996 / 1998 FIFA World Cup qualifier / Luxembourg - Russia 0-4 (Tikhonov 34' Kanchelskis 39' Beschastnykh 58' Karpin 81' Nikiforov (red card) 37') / Luxembourg, Stade Josy Barthel / Attendance: 5,660

Russia: Cherchesov (Ovchinnikov, 75), Minko, Nikiforov, Tikhonov, Karpin, Tetradze, Onopko (captain), Kanchelskis, Beschastnykh (Radimov, 81), Kolyvanov, Mostovoi (Bushmanov, 46).
