= Reshetnikov =

Reshetnikov (masculine, Russian: Решетников) or Reshetnikova (feminine, Russian: Решетникова) is a Russian surname. Notable people with the surname include:

- Eugene Reshetnikov (born 1957), Russian clergyman
- Fyodor Reshetnikov (disambiguation) several people
- Igor Reshetnikov (born 1975), Russian soccer coach and former player
- Leonid Reshetnikov (footballer) (born 1986), Russian soccer player
- Leonid Petrovich Reshetnikov (born 1947), Soviet–Russian secret service agent
- Maxim Reshetnikov (born 1979), Russian politician
- Tatyana Reshetnikova (born 1966), Russian hurdler
- Vasily Reshetnikov (1919–2023), Soviet pilot
- Veniamin Reshetnikov (born 1986), Russian sabre fencer
