= Vladimir Klontsak =

Vladimir Klontsak may refer to:

- Vladimir Klontsak (footballer, born 1968), Russian football manager and former defender
- Vladimir Klontsak (footballer, born 1994), Russian football defender, and son of above footballer
