= Yevgeni Kranatov =

Russian footballer and coach (born 1962)

Personal information
- Full name: Yevgeni Yuryevich Kranatov
- Date of birth: 22 November 1962 (age 63)
- Place of birth: Kazan, Russian SFSR
- Height: 1.84 m (6 ft 1/2 in)
- Position: Goalkeeper

Team information
- Current team: FC Anzhi-Yunior Zelenodolsk (asst coach)

Youth career
- Trudovyye Rezervy Kazan

Senior career*
Years	Team	Apps	(Gls)
1980	FC Volna Kazan		
1981	FC Svetotekhnika Saransk	1	(0)
1982–1983	FC Torpedo Moscow	0	(0)
1983	FC Rubin Kazan	27	(0)
1984–1985	FC Dynamo Kirov	32	(0)
1986	FC Turbina Brezhnev	32	(0)
1986	FC Lokomotiv Moscow	0	(0)
1987	FC Rubin Kazan	19	(0)
1988	FC Kuzbass Kemerovo	7	(0)
1989–1992	FC Shinnik Yaroslavl	130	(0)
1994–1997	FC Neftekhimik Nizhnekamsk	84	(0)
1998–1999	FC KAMAZ-Chally Naberezhnye Chelny	15	(0)
2000–2001	FC Balakovo	31	(0)
2004	FC NNPZ Nizhnekamsk		
2005	FC Neftekhimik Nizhnekamsk	4	(0)

Managerial career
- 2002–2004: FC Neftekhimik Nizhnekamsk (assistant)
- 2006: FC KAMAZ-2 Naberezhnye Chelny (assistant)
- 2007–2011: FC Rubin Kazan (academy coach)
- 2012: FC KAMAZ Naberezhnye Chelny (GK coach)
- 2013–2014: FC Rubin-2 Kazan (assistant)
- 2014–2016: FC Rubin Kazan (GK coach)
- 2017–: FC Anzhi-Yunior Zelenodolsk (assistant)
- * Club domestic league appearances and goals

Yevgeni Yuryevich Kranatov (Russian: Евгений Юрьевич Кранатов; born 22 November 1962) is a Russian football coach and a former player. He works as an assistant coach with FC Anzhi-Yunior Zelenodolsk.
