= Baryshev =

Baryshev (masculine, Russian: Барышев) or Barysheva (feminine, Russian: Барышевa) is a Russian surname. Notable people with the surname include:

- Olga Barysheva (born 1954), Russian basketball player
- Tatyana Barysheva (1896–1979), Russian Soviet actress
- Varvara Barysheva (born 1977), Russian speed skater
- Victor Barîșev (born 1978), Moldovan footballer
- Vladimir Baryshev (born 1960), Russian footballer and manager
