= Yevgeni Sakharov =

Russian footballer

Personal information
- Full name: Yevgeni Nikolayevich Sakharov
- Date of birth: 22 July 1988 (age 38)
- Height: 1.65 m (5 ft 5 in)
- Position: Midfielder

Senior career*
Years	Team	Apps	(Gls)
2006–2010	FC Tekstilshchik Ivanovo	102	(6)
2012	FC Dynamo Kostroma	10	(0)
2012	FC Dolgoprudny	12	(1)
2013	FC Dynamo Kostroma	0	(0)
2014–2015	FC Spartak Kostroma	9	(0)
- * Club domestic league appearances and goals

Yevgeni Nikolayevich Sakharov (Russian: Евгений Николаевич Сахаров; born 22 July 1988) is a former Russian professional football player.

== Club career ==
He played in the Russian Football National League, for FC Tekstilshchik Ivanovo in 2007.
