= Vitali Abramov =

Vitali Abramov may refer to:

- Vitaliy Abramov (born 1974), Kazakhstani footballer
- Vitalii Abramov (born 1998), Russian ice hockey player
