= Nikolai Tsvetkov (footballer) =

Russian footballer

Personal information
- Full name: Nikolai Leonidovich Tsvetkov
- Date of birth: 1 March 1964 (age 62)
- Place of birth: Nizhny Tagil, Russian SFSR
- Height: 1.78 m (5 ft 10 in)
- Position: Defender

Youth career
- FC Uralets Nizhny Tagil

Senior career*
Years	Team	Apps	(Gls)
1981–1989	FC Uralets Nizhny Tagil	200	(5)
1990	FC Gastello Ufa	39	(0)
1991	FC Uralets Nizhny Tagil	40	(1)
1992	FC Uralmash Yekaterinburg	10	(0)
1993–1999	FC Uralets Nizhny Tagil	191	(6)
2003	FC Metallurg Nizhnyaya Salda		
- * Club domestic league appearances and goals

Nikolai Leonidovich Tsvetkov (Russian: Николай Леонидович Цветков; born 1 March 1964) is a former Russian football player.

== Club career ==
He made his Russian Premier League debut for FC Uralmash Yekaterinburg on 2 August 1992 in a game against FC Dynamo Stavropol. That was his only season in the top tier.
