= Vladimir Bluzhin =

Russian footballer

Personal information
- Full name: Vladimir Nikolayevich Bluzhin
- Date of birth: 22 March 1969 (age 57)
- Place of birth: Nizhny Tagil, Russian SFSR
- Height: 1.78 m (5 ft 10 in)
- Position: Defender

Youth career
- FC Uralets Nizhny Tagil

Senior career*
Years	Team	Apps	(Gls)
1987–1988	FC Uralets Nizhny Tagil	32	(5)
1989	FC MTsOP-Metallurg Sverdlovsk	30	(3)
1990	FC Iskra Smolensk	39	(8)
1991–1992	FC Uralmash Yekaterinburg	61	(4)
1992–1993	Szeged LC	13	(1)
1993–1996	FC Uralmash Yekaterinburg	98	(7)
1997	FC Arsenal Tula	14	(0)
1997	FC Gazovik-Gazprom Izhevsk	9	(0)
1998–2003	FC Uralmash Yekaterinburg	96	(1)
- * Club domestic league appearances and goals

Vladimir Nikolayevich Bluzhin (Russian: Владимир Николаевич Блужин; born 22 March 1969) is a former Russian professional footballer.

== Club career ==
He made his professional debut in the Soviet Second League in 1987 for FC Uralets Nizhny Tagil. He played four games in the UEFA Intertoto Cup 1996 for FC Uralmash Yekaterinburg.

== Personal life ==
His son Vyacheslav Bluzhin also played football professionally.
