= Andrei Morozov =

Russian footballer

Personal information
- Full name: Andrei Vladimirovich Morozov
- Date of birth: 3 April 1968 (age 58)
- Height: 1.84 m (6 ft 0 in)
- Positions: Defender; midfielder

Senior career*
Years	Team	Apps	(Gls)
1991–1995	FC Uralets-TS Nizhny Tagil	163	(17)
1996–1998	FC Ural Yekaterinburg	60	(2)
1999–2000	FC Uralets-TS Nizhny Tagil	52	(1)
- * Club domestic league appearances and goals

Andrei Vladimirovich Morozov (Russian: Андрей Владимирович Морозов; born 3 April 1968) is a former Russian professional footballer.

== Club career ==
He made his professional debut in the Soviet Second League B in 1991 for FC Uralets-TS Nizhny Tagil. He played 3 games in the 1996 UEFA Intertoto Cup for FC Ural Yekaterinburg.
