= Robert Yevdokimov =

Russian footballer (born 1970)

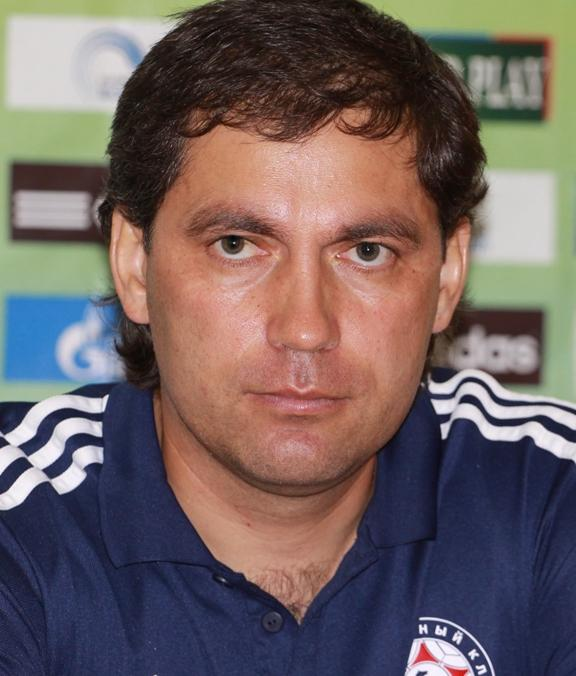

Personal information
- Full name: Robert Gennadyevich Yevdokimov
- Date of birth: 27 February 1970 (age 56)
- Place of birth: Nizhnekamsk, Russian SFSR
- Height: 1.78 m (5 ft 10 in)
- Position: Midfielder

Team information
- Current team: FC Neftekhimik Nizhnekamsk (manager)

Senior career*
Years	Team	Apps	(Gls)
1987	FC Turbina Brezhnev	15	(5)
1988	FC Torpedo Naberezhnye Chelny	24	(1)
1989	FC Rubin Kazan	32	(2)
1990–1996	FC KAMAZ Naberezhnye Chelny	207	(35)
1997	FC Spartak Moscow	4	(1)
1997–1998	FC KAMAZ-Chally Naberezhnye Chelny	30	(2)
1998	FC Saturn Ramenskoye	11	(1)
1999	FC Krylia Sovetov Samara	15	(0)
1999	FC Neftekhimik Nizhnekamsk	13	(3)
2000	FC Energiya Chaykovsky	21	(5)
2001	FC Neftekhimik Nizhnekamsk	27	(1)
2002	FC Gazovik-Gazprom Izhevsk	12	(0)
2002	FC Alnas Almetyevsk	13	(0)
2003	FC KAMAZ Naberezhnye Chelny	14	(0)
2004	FC Alnas Almetyevsk	25	(0)

Managerial career
- 2005: FC KAMAZ Naberezhnye Chelny (academy)
- 2006: FC KAMAZ-2 Naberezhnye Chelny (assistant)
- 2006–2008: FC Alnas Almetyevsk
- 2009: FC SOYUZ-Gazprom Izhevsk
- 2009–2011: FC KAMAZ Naberezhnye Chelny
- 2012–2017: FC Orenburg
- 2017: FC Tobol
- 2018: FC Rotor Volgograd
- 2019–2021: FC Nizhny Novgorod
- 2021–2022: FC Kuban Krasnodar
- 2023–2024: FC Akhmat Grozny (assistant)
- 2024: FC Kuban Krasnodar
- 2026–: FC Neftekhimik Nizhnekamsk
- * Club domestic league appearances and goals

Robert Gennadyevich Yevdokimov (Russian: Роберт Геннадьевич Евдокимов; born 27 February 1970) is a Russian professional football coach and a former player who is the manager of FC Neftekhimik Nizhnekamsk.

== Playing career ==
As a player, he made his debut in the Soviet Second League in 1987 for FC Turbina Brezhnev. He played 6 games and scored 1 goal in the UEFA Intertoto Cup 1996 for FC KAMAZ Naberezhnye Chelny.

He won a Bronze medal representing Russia at the 1995 Summer Universiade.

== Coaching career ==
Under his management, FC Orenburg was promoted to the Russian Premier League for the first time ever at the end of the 2015–16 season. Their debut 2016–17 Russian Premier League season ended with relegation through playoffs, and Yevdokimov left the club.

On 16 October 2019, he was hired as manager of the FNL club FC Nizhny Novgorod. He was dismissed by the club on 4 May 2021, two games before the season ended and the club was promoted to the Russian Premier League.

He is currently the Coach of PFC Kuban Krasnodar.

== Honours ==
- Russian Premier League champion: 1997.
- Russian First Division best manager: 2010.
