= Oleg Kokarev =

Russian footballer and coach (born 1963)

Personal information
- Full name: Oleg Ivanovich Kokarev
- Date of birth: 30 March 1963 (age 63)
- Place of birth: Nizhny Tagil, Russian SFSR
- Height: 1.77 m (5 ft 10 in)
- Position: Forward

Youth career
- 1969–1979: FC Vysokogorets Nizhny Tagil
- 1979–1981: Trudovye Rezervy Aleksandriya

Senior career*
Years	Team	Apps	(Gls)
1981–1984	FC Uralets Nizhny Tagil		
1984–1988	FC Vysokogorets Nizhny Tagil		
1989	FC Progress Biysk	35	(11)
1990–1993	FC Okean Nakhodka	142	(34)
1994–1998	FC Uralmash Yekaterinburg	106	(15)
1999	FC Chkalovets Novosibirsk	22	(0)
2000	FC Reformatsiya Abakan	9	(0)
2000	FC Nemkom Krasnodar (amateur)		
2000–2001	FC Yuzhny Yekaterinburg		

Managerial career
- 2001: FC Uralmash Yekaterinburg (VP)
- 2001–2002: FC Uralmash Yekaterinburg (president)
- 2002–2003: FC Ural Yekaterinburg
- 2003–2005: FC Uralets Nizhny Tagil
- 2006: FC Okean Nakhodka (director)
- 2007: FC Irtysh-1946 Omsk
- 2008: FC Okean Nakhodka
- 2009: FC Chita
- 2010: FC Okean Nakhodka
- 2011: FC Sakhalin Yuzhno-Sakhalinsk (assistant)
- 2011–2012: FC Sakhalin Yuzhno-Sakhalinsk
- 2012: FC Sakhalin Yuzhno-Sakhalinsk (assistant)
- 2012: FC Sakhalin Yuzhno-Sakhalinsk
- 2015–2021: FC Ural Yekaterinburg (academy director)
- 2021–2023: FC Sakhalin Yuzhno-Sakhalinsk
- * Club domestic league appearances and goals

Oleg Ivanovich Kokarev (Russian: Олег Иванович Кокарев; born 30 March 1963) is a Russian professional football coach and a former player.

== Club career ==
As a player, he made his debut in the Soviet Second League in 1984 for FC Uralets Nizhny Tagil.
