= Igor Bakhtin =

Russian footballer and coach

Personal information
- Full name: Igor Vladimirovich Bakhtin
- Date of birth: 12 February 1973 (age 53)
- Place of birth: Krasnoyarsk, Russian SFSR
- Height: 1.80 m (5 ft 11 in)
- Positions: Midfielder; defender

Senior career*
Years	Team	Apps	(Gls)
1991–1993	FC Uralets Nizhny Tagil	80	(14)
1994–1997	FC Uralmash Yekaterinburg	109	(13)
1998	FC Uralan Elista	29	(1)
1999	FC Rostselmash Rostov-on-Don	7	(0)
2000–2005	FC Amkar Perm	171	(13)
2006	FC Ural Sverdlovsk Oblast	25	(0)

Managerial career
- 2008–2013: FC Ural Sverdlovsk Oblast (assistant)
- 2013–2014: FC Ural Sverdlovsk Oblast (reserves)
- 2018–2020: FC Orenburg (U19)
- 2022–2024: FC Uralets-TS Nizhny Tagil
- * Club domestic league appearances and goals

Igor Vladimirovich Bakhtin (Russian: Игорь Владимирович Бахтин; born 12 February 1973) is a Russian professional football coach and a former player.

== Club career ==
He made his professional debut in the Soviet Second League in 1991 for FC Uralets Nizhny Tagil.

== European club competitions ==
- UEFA Intertoto Cup 1996 with FC Uralmash Yekaterinburg: 5 games.
- UEFA Intertoto Cup 1999 with FC Rostselmash Rostov-on-Don: 2 games, 1 goal.
