= Albert Borzenkov =

Russian footballer

Personal information
- Full name: Albert Valentinovich Borzenkov
- Date of birth: 3 January 1973 (age 53)
- Place of birth: Kursk, Soviet Union
- Height: 1.86 m (6 ft 1 in)
- Position: Defender

Senior career*
Years	Team	Apps	(Gls)
1990–1991	Avangard Kursk	8	(0)
1992	Druzhba Budyonnovsk	34	(6)
1993–1995	Dynamo Stavropol	83	(5)
1996–2000	Rotor Volgograd	104	(1)
2000	Sokol Saratov	33	(2)
2001–2002	Rotor Volgograd	59	(4)
2003–2004	Sokol Saratov	77	(6)
2005–2006	Tom Tomsk	33	(1)
2006	Shinnik Yaroslavl	0	(0)
2007	Avangard Kursk	19	(0)
2007–2008	Sibir Novosibirsk	11	(0)
2008–2010	Avangard Kursk	66	(1)
2011	Dynamo Kostroma	33	(1)

International career
1994–1995	Russia U-21	9	(0)
1998	Russia	1	(0)

Managerial career
- 2012: Dynamo Kostroma (assistant)
- 2012–2013: Dolgoprudny (assistant)
- 2014: Fakel Voronezh (assistant)
- 2015: FC Avangard-2 Kursk
- 2016: Chayka Peschanokopskoye
- * Club domestic league appearances and goals

Albert Valentinovich Borzenkov (Russian: Альберт Валентинович Борзенков; born 3 January 1973) is a Russian football coach and a former player.

== Honours ==
- Russian Premier League runner-up: 1997.
- Russian Premier League bronze: 1996.
- Top 33 players year-end list: 1996.

== International career ==
Borzenkov played one game for Russia on 30 May 1998 in a friendly against Georgia.
