= Sergey Zhunenko =

Kazakhstani footballer (born 1970)

Personal information
- Full name: Sergey Nikolayevich Zhunenko
- Date of birth: 13 May 1970 (age 56)
- Place of birth: Karasuk, Russian SFSR
- Height: 1.85 m (6 ft 1 in)
- Positions: Defender; midfielder

Senior career*
Years	Team	Apps	(Gls)
1987–1991	FC Kairat	51	(3)
1992	FC Zorya-MALS Luhansk	12	(1)
1992	FC Rotor Volgograd	4	(0)
1993	FC Kairat	0	(0)
1994–1997	FC Rotor Volgograd	91	(0)
1997–1999	FC Shakhtar Donetsk	19	(0)
1998	→ FC Shakhtar-2 Donetsk	8	(1)
1999–2000	FC Metalurh Donetsk	3	(1)
2000	FC Metallurg Lipetsk	3	(0)
2002	FC KAMAZ Naberezhnye Chelny	3	(0)
2002–2003	FC Svetotekhnika Saransk	32	(2)
2005	FC Metallurg Volzhsky		
2006	FC Tekstilshchik Kamyshin	2	(0)
2007	FC Taraz	8	(0)
2008	FC Fakel-StroyArt Voronezh		

International career
1996	Kazakhstan	2	(0)

Managerial career
- 2009: FC FSA Voronezh (director)
- * Club domestic league appearances and goals

Sergey Nikolayevich Zhunenko (Russian: Серге́й Николаевич Жуненко; born 13 May 1970) is a Kazakhstani former professional footballer who played as a defender or midfielder.

== Club career ==
He made his professional debut in the Soviet First League in 1989 for FC Kairat.

== Honours ==
- Russian Premier League runner-up: 1997.
- Russian Premier League bronze: 1996.
- Russian Cup finalist: 1995.
- Ukrainian Premier League runner-up: 1998, 1999.
