= Eduard Yugrin =

Russian footballer

Personal information
- Full name: Eduard Anatolyevich Yugrin
- Date of birth: 9 September 1968 (age 58)
- Place of birth: Sverdlovsk, Russian SFSR
- Height: 1.80 m (5 ft 11 in)
- Position: Defender

Youth career
- FC Turbina Brezhnev

Senior career*
Years	Team	Apps	(Gls)
1987–1993	FC KAMAZ Naberezhnye Chelny	151	(3)
1996–1998	FC KAMAZ Naberezhnye Chelny	49	(2)
- * Club domestic league appearances and goals

Eduard Anatolyevich Yugrin (Russian: Эдуард Анатольевич Югрин; born 9 September 1968) is a former Russian professional footballer.

== Club career ==
He made his professional debut in the Soviet Second League in 1987 for FC Turbina Brezhnev. He played 5 games in the UEFA Intertoto Cup 1996 for FC KAMAZ-Chally Naberezhnye Chelny.
