= Maksim Tishchenko =

Russian-Ukrainian footballer and coach

Personal information
- Full name: Maksim Viktorovich Tishchenko
- Date of birth: 30 August 1974 (age 52)
- Place of birth: Zaporizhzhia, Ukrainian SSR
- Height: 1.86 m (6 ft 1 in)
- Position: Midfielder

Senior career*
Years	Team	Apps	(Gls)
1993–1994	FC Viktor Zaporizhzhia	38	(13)
1995	FC Metalurh Zaporizhzhia	10	(1)
1995	FC Dynamo Stavropol	34	(8)
1995	FC Dynamo-d Stavropol	1	(0)
1996–2001	FC Rotor Volgograd	92	(8)
1997	FC Rotor-d Volgograd	3	(2)
1998–2000	FC Rotor-2 Volgograd	21	(4)
2001	FC Metallurg Krasnoyarsk	17	(3)
2002	FC Rotor Volgograd	0	(0)
2003–2004	FC Arsenal Tula	55	(7)
2005	FC Ural Yekaterinburg	4	(0)
2005	FC Volgar-Gazprom Astrakhan	14	(0)
2006	FC Zvezda Irkutsk	7	(0)
2007	FC Spartak Kostroma	27	(2)
2008–2009	FC Avangard Kursk	60	(17)
2010–2011	FC Dynamo Kostroma	36	(3)

Managerial career
- 2011: FC Dynamo Kostroma (assistant)
- 2012–2013: FC Zirka Kropyvnytskyi (assistant)
- 2014: FK Banga Gargždai
- 2020: FC Khimki (U-21)
- 2024: FC Pharma Moscow
- 2024: Academy FC Torpedo Moscow
- 2026: FC Zarya Luhansk
- * Club domestic league appearances and goals

Maksim Viktorovich Tishchenko (Russian: Максим Викторович Тищенко; Ukrainian: Максим Вікторович Тищенко; born 30 August 1974) is a Russian professional football coach and a former player. He also holds Ukrainian citizenship.

== Club career ==
He made his debut in the Russian Premier League in 1996 for FC Rotor Volgograd.

== Honours ==
- Russian Premier League runner-up: 1997.
- Russian Premier League bronze: 1996.
- Russian Second Division, Zone Center best defender: 2009.

== European competition history ==
All with FC Rotor Volgograd.

- UEFA Intertoto Cup 1996: 8 games.
- UEFA Cup 1997–98: 2 games.
- UEFA Cup 1998–99: 2 games.
