= Andrei Danilov =

Russian footballer

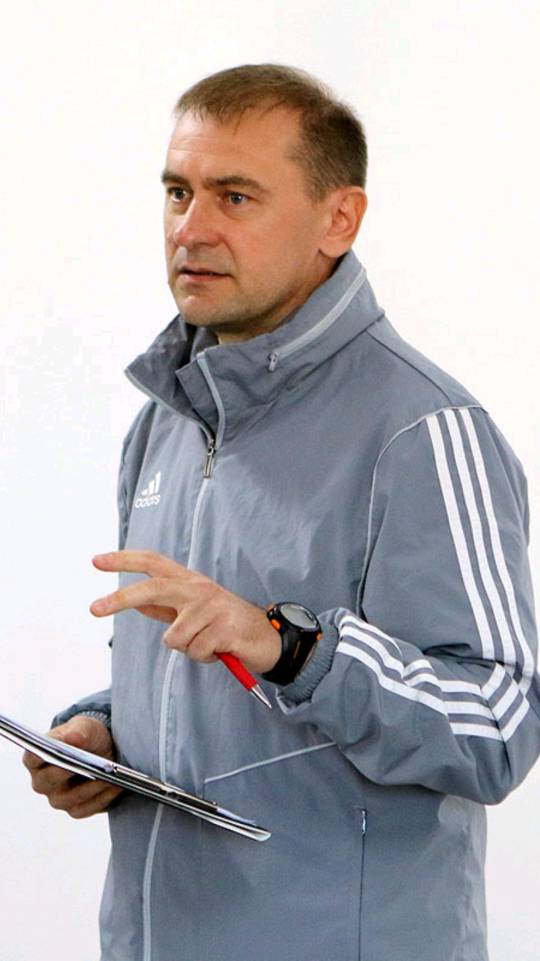

Personal information
- Full name: Andrei Sergeyevich Danilov
- Date of birth: 2 January 1974 (age 52)
- Place of birth: Kachkanar, Russia
- Height: 1.74 m (5 ft 9 in)
- Position: Midfielder

Senior career*
Years	Team	Apps	(Gls)
1992	FC Gornyak Kachkanar	30	(11)
1993–1996	FC Uralets Nizhny Tagil	87	(16)
1996	FC Uralmash Yekaterinburg	10	(1)
1997–1998	FC Irtysh Omsk	74	(3)
1999	FC Lada-Simbirsk Dimitrovgrad	20	(1)
1999–2001	FC Sokol Saratov	52	(4)
2001	FC Metallurg Krasnoyarsk	32	(4)
2002–2003	FC Ural Yekaterinburg	62	(16)
2004	FC Metallurg-Kuzbass Novokuznetsk	34	(1)
2005	FC Spartak Chelyabinsk	38	(10)
2006	FC Lada Togliatti	11	(0)
2006	FC Spartak Nizhny Novgorod	17	(2)
2007	FC Metallurg Krasnoyarsk	24	(0)
2008	FC Arsenal Tula	17	(1)

Managerial career
- 2017–2018: FC Ural-2 Yekaterinburg (assistant)
- 2018: FC Ural-2 Yekaterinburg
- 2018–2020: FC Ural Yekaterinburg (assistant)
- 2020–2021: FC Arsenal Tula (assistant)
- * Club domestic league appearances and goals

Andrei Sergeyevich Danilov (Russian: Андрей Серге́евич Данилов; born 2 January 1974) is a Russian professional football manager and a former player.

== Playing career ==
He made his professional debut in the Russian Second Division in 1992 for FC Gornyak Kachkanar. He played 6 games in the UEFA Intertoto Cup 1996 for FC Uralmash Yekaterinburg.
