= Rinat Vasikov =

Russian footballer

Personal information
- Full name: Rinat Flurovich Vasikov
- Date of birth: 13 September 1971 (age 55)
- Place of birth: Bashkir ASSR, Russian SFSR
- Height: 1.82 m (5 ft 11 1/2 in)
- Position: Midfielder

Youth career
- Metallurg Verkhnyaya Salda

Senior career*
| Years | Team | Apps | (Gls) |
| 1993 | FC Start Verkhnyaya Salda | | |
| 1995 | FC Gornyak-Vanadiy Kachkanar | 21 | (1) |
| 1996 | FC Uralets Nizhny Tagil | 7 | (0) |
| 1996 | FC Uralmash Yekaterinburg | 1 | (0) |
| 1997 | FC Amkar Perm | 17 | (0) |
| 1997 | FC Uralets Nizhny Tagil | 11 | (0) |
| 1998–1999 | FC Amkar Perm | 31 | (1) |
| 1999–2000 | FC Uralets Nizhny Tagil | 42 | (6) |
| 2001 | FC KAMAZ Naberezhnye Chelny | 6 | (0) |
| 2001 | FC Zenit Chelyabinsk | 15 | (1) |
| 2002–2003 | FC Uralets Nizhny Tagil | 43 | (3) |
- * Club domestic league appearances and goals

Rinat Flurovich Vasikov (Russian: Ринат Флурович Васиков; born 13 September 1971) is a former Russian professional footballer.

== Club career ==
He made his professional debut in the Russian Third League in 1995 for FC Gornyak-Vanadiy Kachkanar. He played 3 games in the UEFA Intertoto Cup 1996 for FC Uralmash Yekaterinburg.
