= Andrei Nikolayev (footballer, born 1976) =

Russian footballer and coach

Personal information
- Full name: Andrei Sergeyevich Nikolayev
- Date of birth: 6 August 1976 (age 50)
- Place of birth: Moscow, Russia
- Height: 1.75 m (5 ft 9 in)
- Position: Midfielder

Senior career*
| Years | Team | Apps | (Gls) |
| 1992–1996 | FC Torpedo-d Moscow | 120 | (19) |
| 1994 | FC Torpedo Moscow | 1 | (0) |
| 1996 | FC Torpedo-Luzhniki Moscow | 20 | (2) |
| 1997 | PFC CSKA Moscow | 3 | (0) |
| 1998 | FC Krylia Sovetov Samara | 0 | (0) |
| 1999 | FC Khimki | 12 | (1) |
| 1999 | FC Chernomorets Novorossiysk | 5 | (0) |
| 2001 | FC Khimki | 4 | (0) |
| 2002 | FC Rybinsk | 8 | (0) |

Managerial career
- 2017–2018: FC Veles Moscow (administrator)
- 2018–2019: FC Veles Moscow (assistant)
- * Club domestic league appearances and goals

Andrei Sergeyevich Nikolayev (Russian: Андрей Серге́евич Николаев; born 6 August 1976) is a Russian professional football coach and a former player.

== Club career ==
He made his professional debut in the Russian Second Division in 1992 for FC Torpedo-d Moscow. He played 3 games in the UEFA Cup 1996–97 for FC Torpedo-Luzhniki Moscow. He also played 1 game for FC Krylia Sovetov Samara in the Russian Cup.
