= Konstantin Kamnev =

Russian footballer

Personal information
- Full name: Konstantin Nikolayevich Kamnev
- Date of birth: 20 June 1972 (age 54)
- Place of birth: Odesa, Ukrainian SSR
- Height: 1.78 m (5 ft 10 in)
- Positions: Midfielder; forward

Youth career
- FC Chornomorets Odesa

Senior career*
Years	Team	Apps	(Gls)
1989–1990	FC Chornomorets Odesa	0	(0)
1991	SKA Odesa	1	(0)
1992	FC Terek Grozny	33	(16)
1993–1995	FC Asmaral Moscow	86	(16)
1996	FC Torpedo-Luzhniki Moscow	33	(2)
1997	FC Lokomotiv Moscow	1	(0)
1997–1998	FC Chornomorets Odesa	8	(1)
1998–1999	FC Chernomorets Novorossiysk	50	(6)
2000–2001	FC Torpedo-ZIL Moscow	40	(5)
2001	FC Metallurg Krasnoyarsk	12	(1)
2002	FC Torpedo-ZIL Moscow	14	(1)
2002–2003	FC Terek Grozny	39	(4)
2004	FC Uralan Elista	14	(0)
2005	FC Lokomotiv Kaluga	2	(0)
- * Club domestic league appearances and goals

Konstantin Nikolayevich Kamnev (Russian: Константин Николаевич Камнев; born 20 June 1972) is a former Russian professional footballer.

== Club career ==
He made his professional debut in the Soviet Second League in 1991 for SKA Odesa. He played 4 games in the UEFA Cup 1996–97 for FC Torpedo-Luzhniki Moscow.

== Honours ==
- Russian Cup winner: 1997.
