= Boris Vostrosablin =

Russian footballer (born 1968)

Personal information
- Full name: Boris Aleksandrovich Vostrosablin
- Date of birth: 7 October 1968 (age 58)
- Height: 1.86 m (6 ft 1 in)
- Positions: Midfielder; defender

Youth career
- FC Torpedo Moscow

Senior career*
Years	Team	Apps	(Gls)
1986–1988	FC Torpedo Moscow	0	(0)
1988–1989	SK EShVSM Moscow	45	(6)
1989	FC Torpedo Moscow (reserves)	?	(2)
1990–1991	FC Fakel Voronezh	70	(7)
1992–1999	FC Torpedo Moscow	107	(8)
1992–1994	→ FC Torpedo-d	22	(1)
1997–1998	→ Bucheon SK (loan)	20	(2)
1999	→ FC Torpedo-2	12	(0)
1999	→ FC Arsenal Tula (loan)	18	(0)
2000	FC Zhenis	26	(0)
2001	FC Metallurg Krasnoyarsk	8	(0)
2001	FC Spartak-Orekhovo Orekhovo-Zuyevo	15	(0)
- * Club domestic league appearances and goals

Boris Aleksandrovich Vostrosablin (Russian: Борис Александрович Востросаблин; born 7 October 1968) is a retired Russian professional footballer.

== Club career ==
He made his professional debut in the Soviet Second League in 1988 for SK EShVSM Moscow.

== Honours ==
- Russian Cup winner: 1993.
- Korean League Cup runner-up: 1998.
- Kazakhstan Premier League champion: 2000.

== European club competitions ==
With FC Torpedo Moscow.

- UEFA Cup 1992–93: 3 games.
- UEFA Cup Winners' Cup 1993–94: 1 game.
- UEFA Cup 1996–97: 4 games, 2 goals.
