= Dmitri Prokopenko =

Russian footballer

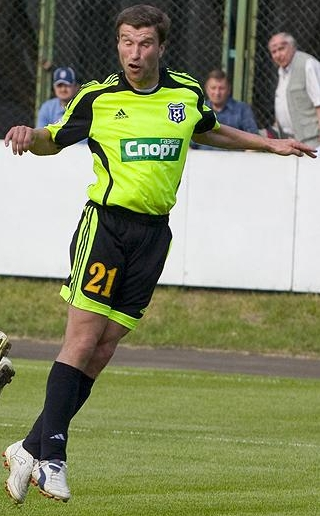

Personal information
- Full name: Dmitri Anatolyevich Prokopenko
- Date of birth: May 24, 1972 (age 54)
- Place of birth: Moscow, Soviet Union
- Height: 1.83 m (6 ft 0 in)
- Position: Striker

Senior career*
Years	Team	Apps	(Gls)
1990	Tom Tomsk	24	(1)
1991–1992	TRASKO Moscow	73	(19)
1993–1996	Torpedo Moscow	96	(18)
1997	Chernomorets Novorossiysk	12	(0)
1997–1998	Braga	21	(3)
1998–2000	Santa Clara	53	(18)
2000–2002	Varzim	60	(15)
2002–2003	Estrela Amadora	21	(5)
2004	Luch-Energiya	6	(0)
2005–2006	Fakel Voronezh	81	(18)
2007–2008	Sportakademklub Moscow	62	(5)
Total		509	(102)
- * Club domestic league appearances and goals

Dmitri Anatolyevich Prokopenko (Russian: Дмитрий Анатольевич Прокопенко; born 24 May 1972) is a former Russian professional footballer who played as a striker.

== Football career ==
Prokopenko made his debut as a senior in the Soviet Second League B in 1990, with FC Tom Tomsk. In his country, in which he won the 1993 Russian Cup, he also represented six other clubs, appearing in the 1993–94 European Cup Winners' Cup (one game) and the 1996–97 UEFA Cup (four) with FC Torpedo Moscow.

In 1997–98, Prokopenko moved to Portugal where he remained six seasons, spending three apiece in the first and second divisions, his first being with S.C. Braga. He achieved top level promotions in 1999 with C.D. Santa Clara and 2001 with Varzim SC, scoring career-bests of (respectively) 12 and 11 goals.

Prokopenko retired at the age 36, after a couple of seasons with FC Sportakademklub Moscow.
