= Volodymyr Zayarnyi =

Ukrainian footballer

Volodymyr Zayarnyi Володимир Заярний
Personal information
- Full name: Volodymyr Anatoliyovych Zayarnyi
- Date of birth: 25 November 1970 (age 55)
- Place of birth: Odesa, Ukrainian SSR
- Height: 1.74 m (5 ft 9 in)
- Positions: Defender; midfielder

Youth career
- DYuSSh-6 Odesa
- 1986–1987: Chornomorets Odesa

Senior career*
| Years | Team | Apps | (Gls) |
| 1987–1988 | Chornomorets Odesa | 1 | (0) |
| 1989–1991 | SKA Odesa | 89 | (4) |
| 1992 | Nyva Ternopil | 7 | (0) |
| 1992–1993 | SC Odesa | 47 | (8) |
| 1993–1994 | Metalurh Zaporizhya | 19 | (0) |
| 1994 | Nyva Vinnytsia | 15 | (2) |
| 1995 | Hapoel Beit She'an | 2 | (0) |
| 1995–1996 | Maccabi Acre | | |
| 1996–1998 | KAMAZ-Chally Naberezhnye Chelny | 74 | (13) |
| 1998–1999 | Sokol Saratov | 22 | (0) |
| 1999–2001 | Chernomorets Novorossiysk | 18 | (3) |
| 2001 | Arsenal Tula | 14 | (0) |
| 2002 | Liepājas Metalurgs | 26 | (0) |
| 2003–2005 | Real Odesa | 27 | (0) |

Managerial career
- 2004–2005: Real Odesa
- * Club domestic league appearances and goals

Volodymyr Anatoliyovych Zayarnyi (Ukrainian: Володимир Анатолійович Заярний; born 25 November 1970) is a Ukrainian professional football coach and a former player.

== Club career ==
He made his professional debut in the Soviet Top League in 1988 for FC Chornomorets Odesa.
