= Vladimir Klontsak (footballer, born 1994) =

Russian footballer

Personal information
- Full name: Vladimir Vladimirovich Klontsak
- Date of birth: 17 May 1994 (age 32)
- Place of birth: Almetyevsk, Russia
- Height: 1.89 m (6 ft 2 1/2 in)
- Position: Defender

Senior career*
Years	Team	Apps	(Gls)
2012–2019	KAMAZ Naberezhnye Chelny	120	(9)
2020	Volga Ulyanovsk	0	(0)
- * Club domestic league appearances and goals

Vladimir Vladimirovich Klontsak (Russian: Владимир Владимирович Клонцак; born 17 May 1994) is a Russian former football defender.

== Club career ==
He made his debut in the Russian Second Division for KAMAZ Naberezhnye Chelny on 5 June 2013 in a game against Nosta Novotroitsk. He made his Russian Football National League debut for KAMAZ on 11 July 2015 in a game against Gazovik Orenburg.

== Personal ==
His father, also named Vladimir Klontsak, is a football manager and a former player.
