= Sergei Lemeshko =

Russian footballer and manager

Personal information
- Full name: Sergei Vladimirovich Lemeshko
- Date of birth: 8 July 1972
- Place of birth: Yurga, Russian SFSR
- Date of death: 9 December 2016 (aged 44)
- Place of death: Kaliningrad, Russia
- Height: 1.84 m (6 ft 1/2 in)
- Position: Midfielder

Senior career*
Years	Team	Apps	(Gls)
1990–1994	FC Zarya Leninsk-Kuznetsky	138	(18)
1995–1996	FC Dynamo Moscow	4	(0)
1995	→ FC Rostselmash Rostov-on-Don (loan)	13	(0)
1995–1996	→ FC Dynamo-d Moscow (loans)	19	(2)
1996	FC Energiya-Tekstilshchik Kamyshin	13	(0)
1997	FC Tyumen	7	(2)
1998–1999	FC Tom Tomsk	43	(4)
2000	FC Arsenal Tula	14	(0)
2000–2001	FC Baltika Kaliningrad	34	(7)
2002	FC Lokomotiv Chita	16	(0)
2003	FC Metallurg-Kuzbass Novokuznetsk	15	(0)
2004	FC Lukoil Chelyabinsk	0	(0)

International career
1993	Russia U-21	2	(0)
- * Club domestic league appearances and goals

Sergei Vladimirovich Lemeshko (Russian: Серге́й Владимирович Лемешко; 8 July 1972 – 9 December 2016) was a Russian professional footballer and manager.

== Club career ==
He made his professional debut in the Soviet Second League in 1990 for FC Shakhtyor Leninsk-Kuznetsky. He played one game in the UEFA Cup Winners' Cup 1995–96 for FC Dynamo Moscow.

== Personal life ==
He died in Kaliningrad in 2016 at the age of 44.
