= Ivan Vinnikov =

Russian footballer

Personal information
- Full name: Ivan Anatolyevich Vinnikov
- Date of birth: 28 May 1964 (age 62)
- Place of birth: Alekseyevskaya, Russian SFSR
- Height: 1.68 m (5 ft 6 in)
- Position: Midfielder

Senior career*
Years	Team	Apps	(Gls)
1982–1996	FC KAMAZ Naberezhnye Chelny	192	(21)
- * Club domestic league appearances and goals

Ivan Anatolyevich Vinnikov (Russian: Иван Анатольевич Винников; born 28 May 1964) is a former Russian professional footballer.

== Club career ==
He made his professional debut in the Soviet Second League in 1988 for FC Torpedo Naberezhnye Chelny. He played 5 games and scored 1 goal in the UEFA Intertoto Cup 1996 for FC KAMAZ-Chally Naberezhnye Chelny.
