= Alexey Bakunin =

Russian footballer

Aleksei Bakunin
Personal information
- Full name: Aleksei Vladimirovich Bakunin
- Date of birth: 18 November 1970 (age 55)
- Place of birth: Sverdlovsk, Russian SFSR
- Height: 1.83 m (6 ft 0 in)
- Position: Defender

Senior career*
Years	Team	Apps	(Gls)
1994–1998	FC Uralmash Yekaterinburg	62	(0)
1999–2000	FC Chkalovets-Olimpik Novosibirsk	10	(0)
- * Club domestic league appearances and goals

Aleksei Vladimirovich Bakunin (Russian: Алексей Владимирович Бакунин; born 18 November 1970) is a Russian former professional footballer.

== Playing career ==
He made his professional debut in the Russian Third League in 1994 for FC Uralmash-d Yekaterinburg. He played 5 games in the UEFA Intertoto Cup 1996 for FC Uralmash Yekaterinburg.
