= Ihor Shukhovtsev =

Ukrainian footballer (born 1971)

Igor Shukhovtsev
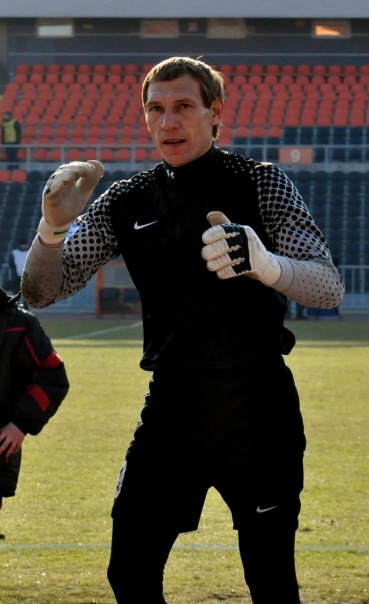

Personal information
- Full name: Igor Viktorovych Shukhovtsev
- Date of birth: 13 July 1971 (age 55)
- Place of birth: Odesa, Ukrainian SSR
- Height: 1.88 m (6 ft 2 in)
- Position: Goalkeeper

Team information
- Current team: FC Kudrivka (goalkeeping coach)

Senior career*
Years	Team	Apps	(Gls)
1992	Nyva Vinnytsia	4	(0)
1992–1993	Odesa	29	(0)
1993–1994	Podillya Khmelnytskyi	21	(0)
1993–1995	Nyva Vinnytsia	13	(0)
1995–1996	Odesa	13	(0)
1996	Uralmash Yekaterinburg	6	(0)
1997–2003	lllichivets Mariupol	152	(0)
2001–2002	→ Illichivets-2 Mariupol	1	(0)
2003–2004	Arsenal Kyiv	9	(0)
2003–2005	lllichivets Mariupol	20	(0)
2004–2005	Tavriya Simferopol	9	(0)
2005–2009	lllichivets Mariupol	85	(0)
2009–2011	Zorya Luhansk	57	(0)
2012–2014	Metalist Kharkiv	1	(0)
2016–2017	Balkany Zorya	1	(0)
Total		421	(0)

Managerial career
- 2011–2012: Tobol (goalkeeping coach)
- 2013–2014: Metalist Kharkiv (goalkeeping coach)
- 2016–2019: Balkany Zorya (goalkeeping coach)
- 2019–2020: Chornomorets Odesa (goalkeeping coach)
- 2020–2024: Mariupol (goalkeeping coach)
- 2024–2026: Kudrivka (goalkeeping coach)
- 2026–: Zorya Luhansk (goalkeeping coach)
- * Club domestic league appearances and goals

Igor Shukhovtsev (Ukrainian: Ігор Вікторович Шуховцев; born 13 July 1971) is a Ukrainian former professional football play and manager. A former goalkeeper, he holds the record for the most goals allowed in the Ukrainian Premier League with 493.

== Career ==
Shukhovtsev played for Metalist Kharkiv in the Ukrainian Premier League. He is also a former goalkeeping coach of Mariupol until 2024. In January 2025 he was appointed as goalkeeping coach of Kudrivka.

On 26 June 2026, he was hired as goalkeeping coach of Zorya Luhansk.
