= Vladyslav Duyun =

Ukrainian footballer (1977–2026)

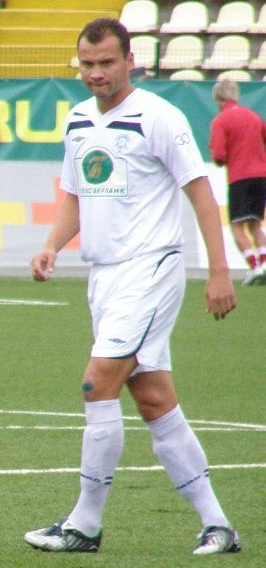
- Duyun with Avangard Podolsk

Personal information
- Full name: Vladyslav Mykolayovych Duyun
- Date of birth: 9 May 1977
- Place of birth: Izmail, Odesa Oblast, Ukrainian SSR, Soviet Union
- Date of death: 15 July 2026 (aged 49)
- Place of death: Moscow Oblast, Russia
- Height: 1.82 m (6 ft 0 in)
- Position: Midfielder

Senior career*
Years	Team	Apps	(Gls)
1994–1995	Zirka Kirovohrad	3	(0)
1995–1996	Metalist Kharkiv	1	(0)
1996	Spartak Msocow	18	(1)
1997	Lokomotiv Nizhny Novgorod	16	(3)
1998–2001	Rostselmash Rostov-on-Don	74	(4)
2001	Lokomotiv Nizhny Novgorod	7	(0)
2001–2002	FC Bataysk		
2002–2003	Sokol Saratov	41	(3)
2004	FC Vityaz Podolsk	30	(6)
2005–2006	Baltika Kaliningrad	66	(3)
2007–2008	FC Vityaz Podolsk	64	(10)
2009–2010	FC Avangard Podolsk	60	(7)
2011	FC Petrotrest Saint Petersburg	35	(1)

International career
1996	Ukraine U21	1	(0)
- * Club domestic league appearances and goals

Vladyslav Mykolayovych Duyun (Ukrainian: Владислав Миколайович Дуюн; 9 May 1977 – 15 July 2026) was a Ukrainian professional footballer who played as a midfielder. He also held Russian citizenship, having moved to Russia permanently at the age of 19. Duyun made his debut in the Russian Premier League in 1996 for Spartak Moscow.

Duyun died on 15 July 2026, at the age of 49, after struggling for roughly a year and a half with pancreatic cancer.

== Honours ==
Spartak Moscow

- Russian Top League: 1996
