= Fyodor Reshetnikov =

Fyodor Reshetnikov may refer to:

- Fyodor Grigoryevich Reshetnikov (1919–2011) - Soviet physicist and metallurgist
- Fyodor Mikhaylovich Reshetnikov (1841–1871) - Russian writer and novelist
- Fyodor Pavlovich Reshetnikov (1906–1988) - Soviet painter
