= Vitali Litvinov =

Russian footballer

Personal information
- Full name: Vitali Viktorovich Litvinov
- Date of birth: 17 November 1970 (age 55)
- Place of birth: Leningrad, Russian SFSR
- Height: 1.87 m (6 ft 1 1/2 in)
- Positions: Defender; midfielder

Youth career
- Bolshevik Leningrad

Senior career*
Years	Team	Apps	(Gls)
1991–1992	FC Progress Chernyakhovsk	46	(5)
1993–1995	FC Torpedo Arzamas	91	(15)
1996	FC Uralmash Yekaterinburg	29	(1)
1997–1998	FC Uralan Elista	44	(8)
1999–2001	FC Torpedo Moscow	60	(5)
2001	FC Torpedo-ZIL Moscow	6	(0)
2002–2003	FC Dynamo-SPb St. Petersburg	30	(4)
2004	FC Vidnoye	17	(2)
2005	FC Dynamo Bryansk	14	(2)
- * Club domestic league appearances and goals

Vitali Viktorovich Litvinov (Russian: Виталий Викторович Литвинов; born 17 November 1970) is a former Russian professional footballer.

== Club career ==
He made his professional debut in the Soviet Second League in 1991 for FC Progress Chernyakhovsk.

== Honours ==
- Russian Premier League bronze: 2000.
- Top-33 year-end best players list: 2000.

== European club competitions ==
- UEFA Intertoto Cup 1996 with FC Uralmash Yekaterinburg: 5 games, 3 goals.
- UEFA Cup 2000–01 with FC Torpedo Moscow: 2 games, 1 goal.
