= Vitaliy Abramov =

Kazakhstani footballer (born 1974)

Personal information
- Full name: Vitaliy Sergeyevich Abramov
- Date of birth: 12 July 1974 (age 52)
- Place of birth: Shakhtinsk, Kazakh SSR
- Height: 1.80 m (5 ft 11 in)
- Position: Midfielder

Team information
- Current team: FC Rotor-2 Volgograd (assistant coach)

Youth career
- UOR Karaganda

Senior career*
Years	Team	Apps	(Gls)
1991	FC Bolat	4	(0)
1991–1992	FC Shakhter Karagandy	4	(0)
1992–1993	FC Volochanin Vyshny Volochyok	48	(13)
1994	FC Vympel Rybinsk	37	(8)
1995–1996	FC Tekstilshchik Kamyshin	41	(3)
1996–1999	FC Rotor Volgograd	91	(6)
1996–1999	→ FC Rotor-d Volgograd	6	(2)
2000–2002	FC Shakhtar Donetsk	29	(2)
2000–2002	→ FC Shakhtar-2 Donetsk	36	(12)
2002	→ FC Metalurh Donetsk (loan)	3	(0)
2002	→ FC Metalurh-2 Donetsk (loan)	6	(4)
2003	FC Volgar-Gazprom Astrakhan	17	(0)
2003	FC Lisma-Mordovia Saransk	21	(0)
2004	FC Uralan Elista	15	(1)
2005	FC Ural Yekaterinburg	34	(3)
2006	FC Rotor Volgograd	24	(2)
2008–2009	FC FSA Voronezh	10	(0)
2009	FC Avangard Kursk	9	(0)

International career
2004	Kazakhstan	1	(0)

Managerial career
- 2019–2022: FC Rotor-2 Volgograd (assistant)
- 2025–: FC Rotor-2 Volgograd (assistant)
- * Club domestic league appearances and goals

Vitaliy Sergeyevich Abramov (Russian: Виталий Серге́евич Абрамов; born 12 July 1974) is a Kazakhstani professional football coach and a former player. He also holds Russian citizenship. He is an assistant coach with FC Rotor-2 Volgograd.

== Club career ==
He made his debut in the Russian Premier League in 1995 for FC Tekstilshchik Kamyshin.

== Honours ==
Rotor Volgograd

- Russian Premier League runner-up: 1997
- Russian Premier League bronze: 1996

Shaktar Donetsk

- Ukrainian Premier League champion: 2002
- Ukrainian Premier League runner-up: 2000, 2001

== European club competitions ==
With FC Rotor Volgograd.

- 1996 UEFA Intertoto Cup: 8 games, 3 goals.
- 1997–98 UEFA Cup: 5 games, 1 goal.
- 1998–99 UEFA Cup: 2 games, 1 goal.
