= Oleg Kornienko =

Kazakhstani-Russian footballer (born 1973)

Oleg Korniyenko
Personal information
- Full name: Oleg Valeryevich Korniyenko
- Date of birth: 28 May 1973 (age 53)
- Place of birth: Vladikavkaz, North Ossetian ASSR, Russian SFSR, Soviet Union
- Height: 1.81 m (5 ft 11 in)
- Positions: Centre back; full back

Youth career
- FC Spartak Ordzhonikidze

Senior career*
Years	Team	Apps	(Gls)
1989	Spartak Ordzhonikidze	0	(0)
1990	Avtodor Vladikavkaz	28	(2)
1991	Spartak Vladikavkaz	0	(0)
1991–1994	Avtodor Vladikavkaz	95	(6)
1994–1999	Alania Vladikavkaz	109	(1)
2000–2001	Zhenis	40	(6)
2001–2008	Shakhter Karagandy	205	(24)

International career
1994	Russia U-21	2	(0)
2007	Kazakhstan	2	(0)

Managerial career
- 2009: Shakhter Karagandy (assistant)
- 2010–2011: Shakhter Karagandy (assistant)
- 2012–2014: Shakhter Karagandy (assistant)
- 2015: Ordabasy (assistant)
- 2018–2019: Atyrau (assistant)
- 2021–2022: Alania-2 Vladikavkaz (assistant)
- * Club domestic league appearances and goals

Oleg Korniyenko (Russian: Олег Валерьевич Корниенко; born 28 May 1973) is a Kazakhstani-Russian football coach and a former player.

== Club career ==
Korniyenko started off as a central defender but mostly played as a right or left back.

He made his debut in the Russian Premier League in 1994 for Spartak Vladikavkaz.

== International ==
He has capped for Kazakhstan 2 times.

== Honours ==
- Russian Premier League champion: 1995
- Russian Premier League runner-up: 1996
- Kazakhstan Premier League champion: 2000

== European club competitions ==
All with FC Alania Vladikavkaz.

- 1995–96 UEFA Cup: 2 games
- 1996–97 UEFA Champions League qualification: 2 games
- 1996–97 UEFA Cup: 2 games
- 1997–98 UEFA Cup: 3 games
