= Zaur Khapov =

Russian footballer

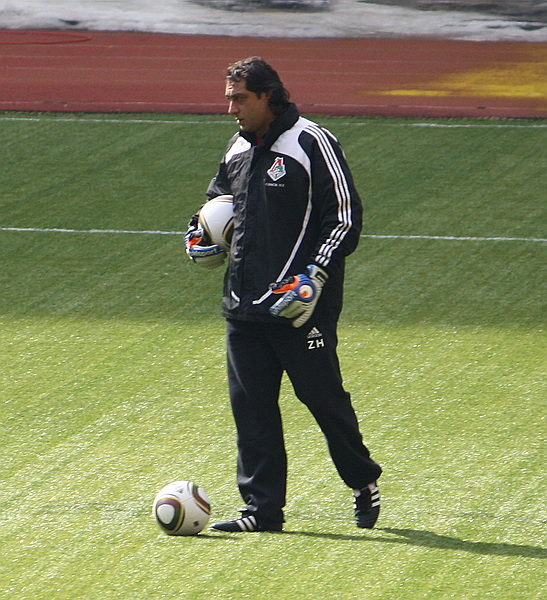

Personal information
- Full name: Zaur Zalimbiyevich Khapov
- Date of birth: 21 October 1964 (age 62)
- Place of birth: Nalchik, USSR
- Height: 1.88 m (6 ft 2 in)
- Position: Goalkeeper

Team information
- Current team: FC Lokomotiv Moscow (assistant manager)

Senior career*
| Years | Team | Apps | (Gls) |
| 1982 | PFC Spartak Nalchik | 22 | (0) |
| 1983–1984 | FC SKA Rostov-on-Don | 1 | (0) |
| 1985–1986 | PFC Spartak Nalchik | 62 | (0) |
| 1987–1988 | FC Spartak Moscow | 0 | (0) |
| 1988 | FC Shinnik Yaroslavl | 30 | (0) |
| 1988–1990 | FC Dinamo Tbilisi | 35 | (0) |
| 1991–1999 | FC Alania Vladikavkaz | 233 | (0) |
| 2000–2005 | FC Lokomotiv Moscow | 2 | (0) |

International career
| 1994 | Russia | 2 | (0) |

Managerial career
- 2005: FC Lokomotiv Moscow (assistant)
- 2006: FC Lokomotiv Moscow (reserves assistant)
- 2006: FC Lokomotiv Moscow (GK coach)
- 2007: FC Amkar Perm (assistant)
- 2008–2012: FC Lokomotiv Moscow (assistant)
- 2012–2016: FC Anzhi Makhachkala (GK coach)
- 2016–2021: FC Lokomotiv Moscow (GK coach)
- 2022: FC Lokomotiv Moscow
- 2022–: FC Lokomotiv Moscow (assistant)
- * Club domestic league appearances and goals

Zaur Zalimbiyevich Khapov (Russian: Заур Залимбиевич Хапов; born 21 October 1964) is a Russian football coach and a former goalkeeper who won two international caps for Russia in 1994. He is the assistant manager of FC Lokomotiv Moscow.

== Club career ==
He was Alania Vladikavkaz's goalkeeper during their Russian league title-winning season of 1995.

== International career ==
Khapov played his first game for Russia on 29 January 1994 in a 1–1 draw in a friendly against the United States in Seattle. He also played in another friendly against Mexico in Oakland four days later, which Russia won 4–1.

== Managing career ==
On 4 April 2022, he was appointed manager of FC Lokomotiv Moscow. As Lokomotiv's sporting director Thomas Zorn commented at the time, Khapov was appointed as he possesses the necessary UEFA A Licence and most of the manager duties will continue to be performed by Marvin Compper who does not have such a licence and therefore can not be formally registered with the league as a manager. On 30 June 2022, Josef Zinnbauer was appointed head coach of Lokomotiv, with Khapov continuing to work at the club.

== Honours ==
- Umaglesi Liga winner: 1990.
- Russian Premier League winner: 1995.
- Russian Cup winner: 2001.
- Top 33 players year-end list: 1993, 1994, 1995.
