= Vladyslav Zubkov =

Ukrainian footballer and coach

Personal information
- Full name: Vladyslav Viktorovych Zubkov
- Date of birth: 8 April 1971 (age 55)
- Place of birth: Odesa, Ukrainian SSR
- Height: 1.86 m (6 ft 1 in)
- Positions: Midfielder; defender

Youth career
- Chornomorets Odesa

Senior career*
Years	Team	Apps	(Gls)
1988–1990	FC Chornomorets Odesa	0	(0)
1990–1991	SKA Odesa	51	(7)
1992–1993	FC Metalurh Zaporizhzhia	41	(1)
1993–1994	FC KAMAZ Naberezhnye Chelny	42	(4)
1995	FC Chornomorets Odesa	4	(0)
1995–1996	FC KAMAZ-Chally Naberezhnye Chelny	39	(8)
1997–1999	FC Lokomotiv Nizhny Novgorod	68	(20)
1999	FC Sokol Saratov	12	(1)
2000	FC Metalurh Zaporizhzhia	13	(4)
2000–2001	FC Dnipro Dnipropetrovsk	13	(0)
2001	→ FC Dnipro-2 Dnipropetrovsk	2	(0)
2001	→ FC Dnipro-3 Dnipropetrovsk	5	(0)
2002	FC Irtysh Pavlodar	1	(1)
2002–2004	FC Chornomorets Odesa	5	(0)
2002–2004	→ FC Chornomorets-2 Odesa	16	(0)

International career
1995	Russia (students)	6	(0)

Managerial career
- 2002–2005: FC Chornomorets-2 Odesa (assistant)
- 2005–2007: FC Chornomorets Odesa (reserves)
- 2008–2008: FC Dnister Ovidiopol (assistant)
- 2010–2014: FC Chornomorets-2 Odesa (assistant)
- 2014–2016: FC Real Pharma Odesa
- * Club domestic league appearances and goals

Vladyslav Viktorovych Zubkov (Ukrainian: Владислав Вікторович Зубков, Russian: Владислав Викторович Зубков; born 8 April 1971) is a Ukrainian professional football coach and a former player.

== Club career ==
He made his professional debut in the Soviet Second League in 1990 for SC Odesa.

== Honours ==
- USSR Federation Cup winner: 1990.
- Ukrainian Premier League runner-up: 1995, 1996.
- Ukrainian Premier League bronze: 2001.
- Kazakhstan Premier League champion: 2002.

== European club competitions ==
- 1996 UEFA Intertoto Cup with FC KAMAZ-Chally Naberezhnye Chelny: 6 games.
- 1997 UEFA Intertoto Cup with FC Lokomotiv Nizhny Novgorod: 6 games.
