= Boris Tropaneț =

Moldovan footballer (1964–2008)

Personal information
- Date of birth: 11 October 1964
- Place of birth: Zorya, Odesa Oblast, Soviet Union (now Ukraine)
- Date of death: 22 May 2008 (aged 43)
- Place of death: Chișinău, Moldova
- Height: 1.78 m (5 ft 10 in)
- Positions: Midfielder; striker

Senior career*
Years	Team	Apps	(Gls)
1982–1984	Chornomorets Odesa	4	(1)
1985–1986	SKA Kyiv	74	(27)
1987	Chornomorets Odesa	2	(0)
1987–1988	Nistru Chişinău	62	(12)
1988	Sudnobudivnyk Mykolaiv	0	(0)
1989	Tavriya Simferopol	21	(1)
1989–1991	Nistru Chişinău	79	(11)
1991	Tiligul Tiraspol	7	(2)
1991–1992	Polonia Bytom	9	(2)
1992–1993	Amocom Chişinău	29	(8)
1993–1995	KAMAZ Naberezhnye Chelny	70	(12)
1996	Bucheon Yukong	1	(0)
1996–1998	KAMAZ Naberezhnye Chelny	62	(4)
1998	Sokol Saratov	20	(1)
1998–2001	Zimbru Chişinău	27	(0)
2001	Olimpia Bălţi	1	(0)
2001	Persisam Putra Samarinda	10	(2)

Managerial career
- 2002: Hînceşti (assistant)
- 2003: Zimbru Chişinău (assistant)
- 2004–2007: Moldova U21
- * Club domestic league appearances and goals

Boris Tropaneț (Ukrainian: Борис Якович Тропанець; 11 October 1964 – 22 May 2008) was a Moldovan professional football player and coach.

He was the captain of KAMAZ. As a player, he became Moldavian champion with Zimbru (2000) and reached the third qualifying round of the 1999–2000 Champions League with this club.

He started his coaching career as an assistant coach at Moldovan clubs Hîncești and Zimbru.

From August 2004 to June 2007, he was in charge of the Moldovan youth national team, which was close to reaching the final part of the European Youth Championship. The most successful games - draws with England (2:2), Scotland (0:0), victory over Georgia (5:1). A number of players of the youth national team under his leadership later began to play for the main team of the country: Alexandru Epureanu, Vitaliy Bordian, Alexandru Gatskan, Igor Bugaev, Nikolay Josan.

The best coach of Moldova in 2005.

== Career ==
He took his first steps in soccer in the Children's and Youth Sports School of Sarata, first coach - V.R. Zlatov. Then he moved to SDYUSHOR "Chernomorets" (Odessa). In 1982-1983 he played in the reserve team of Odessa. At the professional level debuted in the Soviet Top League for FC Chornomorets Odesa on 22 February 1984 in a victorious (3:0) home game 1/16 finals of the USSR Cup against Krasnodar "Kuban". Tropanets came out in the starting line-up, but after receiving a yellow card, he was replaced by Igor Sokolovskiy in the 80th minute. In the USSR Premier League debuted in the Odessa "Chernomorets" on 11 March 1984 in a lost (0:1) away match of the 1st round against Moscow "Torpedo". Boris came on the field in the 76th minute instead of Igor Nakonechny. On 1 July 1984 he scored for the first time at the professional level on the 46th minute of the winning (2:1) home match of the 17th round of the Higher League against Kharkiv Metalist. Boris came on the field in the starting line-up and played the whole match. That season he played 4 matches and scored 1 goal, and played 2 more matches in the USSR Cup.

In 1985 Boris Trapanets was called up for military service, which he served in the second league of the Kiev SKA. During the 1986 season he returned to Chernomorets, but he failed to win a place in the first team and spent the rest of the season playing in the double team, where he scored 2 goals in the double team championship. In the next season he also failed to become the main player, having played 2 matches in the first team. Therefore, in the course of the season he moved to Chisinau "Nistru", which at that time played in the Second League. In 1988 he helped the Kishinev club to enter the First League, but during the 1989 season he moved to another first league team, Simferopol "Tavria". In the shirt of "Crimeans" played 21 matches (1 goal) in the championship, and the next season again defended the colors of "Nistru". He played for the Moldovan club until 1991. In 1991, during the season he joined Tiraspol "Tiligul".

In 1991 he went abroad to Poland, where he signed a contract with local second league club Polonia (Bytom). In the season 1991/92 in the Polish championship he played 9 matches and scored 2 goals.

In 1992 he returned to Moldova, where he signed a contract with the top league club "Amok" (Chisinau), where he played 29 matches and scored 8 goals. In 1993 he left for Russia, where he became a player of local KAMAZ. He defended the colors of the club from Naberezhnye Chelny until 1996. In the 1996 Intertoto Cup he played 4 matches for KAMAZ. He was the captain of KAMAZ. In the Russian Premier League he played 70 matches and scored 12 goals, played 5 more matches (3 goals) in the Russian Cup. In 1996 he left the Russian club and moved to South Korea. He signed a contract with "Pucheon Yukon", which played in the Korean Super League. However, Boris failed to gain a foothold in the South Korean club and after playing 1 match in the Korean championship in 1996 he returned to KAMAZ. However, the return was not very successful. Tropanets was a player of the main squad, but at the end of the season the team was relegated to the First League. Boris started the 1998 season with a team from Naberezhnye Chelny and continued with Saratov Sokol.

He played 4 games in the UEFA Intertoto Cup 1996 for FC KAMAZ-Chally Naberezhnye Chelny.

In 1998, he returned to Zimbru, where he won the national championship (2000) and reached the third qualifying round of the Champions League in 1999/00 season. He spent the second part of the 2000/01 season in "Olimpija" (Balti), but after playing 1 match he left the club. In the same year he left for Indonesia, where he signed a contract with a representative of the top division of the local championship, club "Pusam Samurin" (10 matches, 2 goals). In this club and finished his career as a footballer.

== Coaching activity ==
He began his coaching career as an assistant coach at Moldovan clubs Hincesti and Zimbru.

From August 2004 to June 2007, he was in charge of the Moldovan youth national team, which was close to reaching the final of the European Youth Championship. The most successful matches were draws with England (2:2), Scotland (0:0), and a victory over Georgia (5:1). A number of players of the youth national team under his leadership later began to play for the main team of the country: Alexandru Epureanu, Vitalie Bordian, Alexandru Gațcan, Igor Bugaiov, and Nicolae Josan.

== Legacy and interesting facts ==
- A stadium was named in his honour in the village of Zorya, where played in local club FC Balkany Zorya.
- Alina Tropanets (MD/RO: Alina Tropaneț, RU: Алина Тропанец), the daughter of Boris Tropanets, is a well-known entrepreneur in Chisinau (Moldova), founder of the decoration and event organization company XO studio, as well as a well-known floristry studio XOstudio FLOWERS in the Capital of Moldova. Alina is actively involved in social programs and charity.
