= Vitaliy Skysh =

Ukrainian footballer

Personal information
- Full name: Vitaliy Volodymyrovych Skysh
- Date of birth: 23 March 1971 (age 55)
- Place of birth: Kirovohrad, Ukrainian SSR
- Height: 1.88 m (6 ft 2 in)
- Positions: Midfielder; defender

Youth career
- KhOSShISP Kharkiv

Senior career*
Years	Team	Apps	(Gls)
1989–1991	FC Metalist Kharkiv	0	(0)
1991	FC Veres Rivne	7	(0)
1992	FC Zirka Kirovohrad	32	(9)
1993–1994	FC Chornomorets Odesa	27	(2)
1994	SK Odesa	11	(2)
1995	FC Prykarpattya Ivano-Frankivsk	13	(0)
1996	FC Chornomorets Odesa	9	(1)
1996	FC Alania Vladikavkaz	6	(0)
1997–1998	FC Zirka Kirovohrad	23	(4)
1998	FC Metalist Kharkiv	10	(0)
1998	→ FC Metalist-2 Kharkiv	6	(1)
1999	FC Zirka Kirovohrad	6	(0)
1999	→ FC Zirka-2 Kirovohrad	1	(0)
1999–2001	FC Metalurh Zaporizhya	26	(4)
1999–2001	→ FC Metalurh-2 Zaporizhya	12	(2)
2000	→ SSSOR-Metalurh Zaporizhzhia	1	(1)
2002	FC Prykarpattya Ivano-Frankivsk	10	(0)
2002–2003	FC Elektrometalurh-NZF Nikopol	13	(1)
- * Club domestic league appearances and goals

Vitaliy Volodymyrovych Skysh (Ukrainian: Віталій Володимирович Скиш; born 23 March 1971) is a former Ukrainian professional football player.

== Club career ==
He played 2 games in the 1996–97 UEFA Champions League qualification for FC Alania Vladikavkaz against Rangers, where his side lost 1–3 in the first leg at Ibrox and 2–7 at the Spartak Stadium for a 3-10 aggregate. In his book he claimed Rangers were the best side he had ever played against in his entire career.

== Honours ==
- Russian Premier League runner-up: 1996.
