= Platon Zakharchuk =

Russian footballer and coach

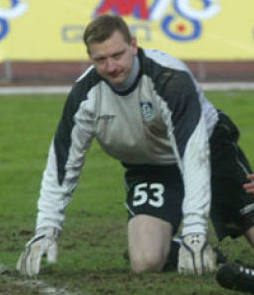
- Zakharchuk in 2005.

Personal information
- Full name: Platon Platonovich Zakharchuk
- Date of birth: 10 September 1972 (age 54)
- Place of birth: Naberezhnye Chelny, Russian SFSR
- Height: 1.95 m (6 ft 5 in)
- Position: Goalkeeper

Team information
- Current team: FC KAMAZ Naberezhnye Chelny (GK coach)

Senior career*
Years	Team	Apps	(Gls)
1989–1991	FC KAMAZ Naberezhnye Chelny	45	(0)
1992	PFC CSKA Moscow	1	(0)
1993–1996	FC KAMAZ Naberezhnye Chelny	106	(0)
1997–1999	FC Rotor Volgograd	66	(0)
2000	FC Sokol Saratov	35	(0)
2001–2002	FC Lokomotiv Moscow	3	(0)
2002	FC Sokol Saratov	18	(0)
2003	FC Lokomotiv Moscow	5	(0)
2003–2004	FC Sokol Saratov	64	(0)
2005	FC Shinnik Yaroslavl	3	(0)
2005–2008	FC KAMAZ Naberezhnye Chelny	53	(0)

Managerial career
- 2014–2024: FC Orenburg (assistant)
- 2024: FC Orenburg-2 (GK coach)
- 2024: FC Kuban Krasnodar (GK coach)
- 2025: FC Orenburg-2 (GK coach)
- 2025–: FC KAMAZ Naberezhnye Chelny (GK coach)
- * Club domestic league appearances and goals

Platon Platonovich Zakharchuk (Russian: Платон Платонович Захарчук; born 10 September 1972) is a Russian professional football coach and a former player who is the goalkeeping coach with FC KAMAZ Naberezhnye Chelny.

He made his professional debut in the Soviet Second League in 1989 for FC Torpedo Naberezhnye Chelny.

== Honours ==
- Russian Premier League runner-up: 1997, 2001.

== European club competitions ==
- UEFA Intertoto Cup 1996 with FC KAMAZ-Chally Naberezhnye Chelny: 6 games.
- UEFA Cup 1997–98 with FC Rotor Volgograd: 6 games.
