= Sergei Agashkov =

Turkmen football player and manager (1962–2026)

Sergei Agashkov Сергей Агашков
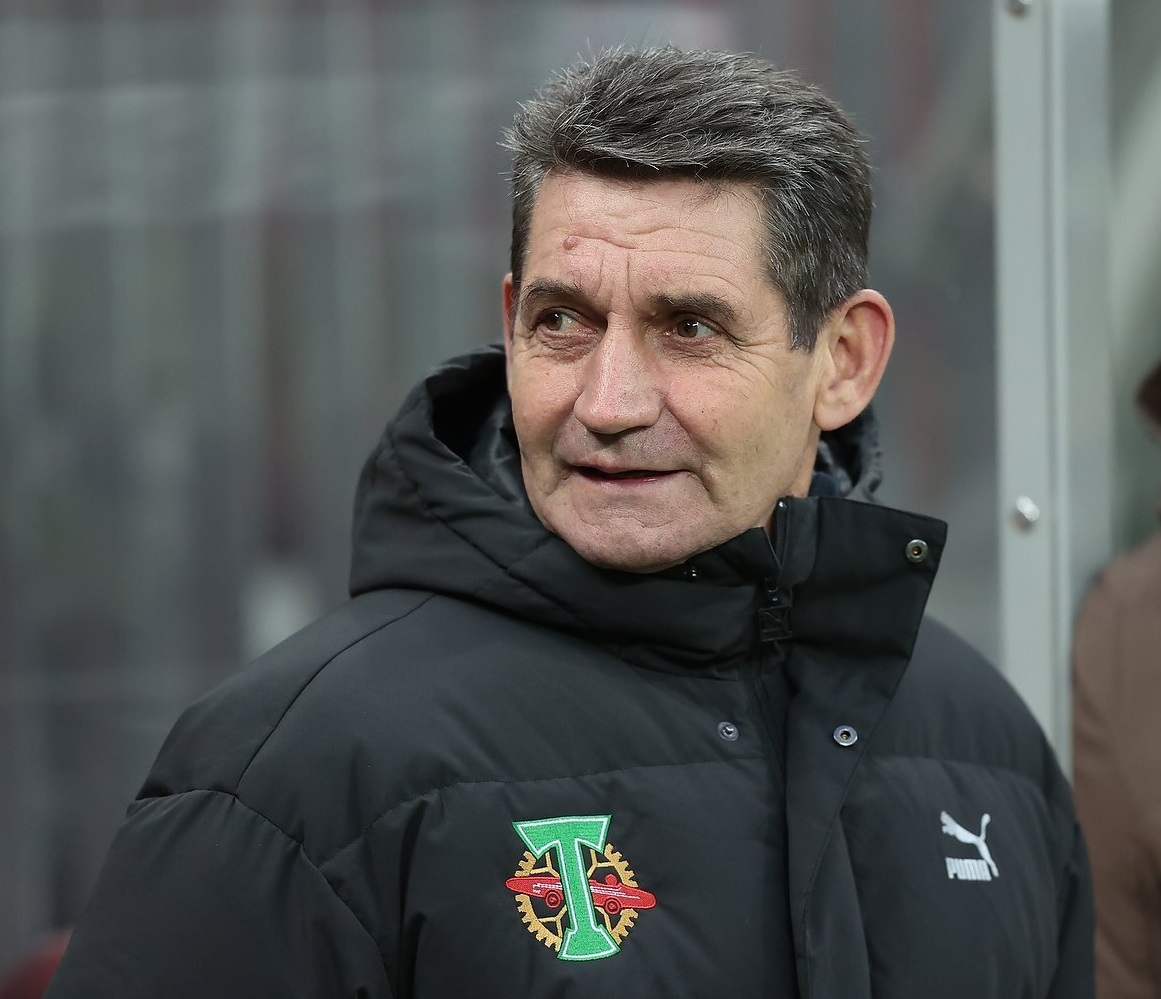
- Agashkov in 2022

Personal information
- Full name: Sergei Nikolaevich Agashkov
- Date of birth: 16 November 1962
- Place of birth: Ashgabat, Turkmen SSR, Soviet Union
- Date of death: July 2026 (aged 63)
- Height: 1.87 m (6 ft 2 in)
- Position: Midfielder

Senior career*
Years	Team	Apps	(Gls)
1980–1983	Kolhozchi Asgabat		
1984–1986	SKA Rostov-on-Don	104	(17)
1987–1991	Torpedo Moscow	131	(14)
1992	POSCO Atoms	3	(0)
1993	Beitar Tel Aviv	6	(2)
1993–1994	Ankaragücü	23	(2)
1994–1997	Torpedo Moscow	78	(7)
1994–1997	Torpedo-Luzhniki-d	17	(0)
Total		356	(40)

Managerial career
- 1997: Torpedo Moscow (assistant)
- 1999–2000: Torpedo-2 (assistant)
- 2001–2004: Torpedo Moscow (U-21 assistant)
- 2005: Torpedo Moscow (U-21)
- 2006: Dinaburg
- 2006–2007: Volga Tver
- 2008–2023: FShM Moscow
- 2024–2026: Academy Torpedo Moscow
- * Club domestic league appearances and goals

Sergei Nikolaevich Agashkov (Russian: Сергей Николаевич Агашков; 16 November 1962 – July 2026) was a Turkmen-Russian football player and coach.

== Club career ==
Agashkov had spells at SKA Rostov-on-Don, Torpedo Moscow, Beitar Tel Aviv, POSCO Atoms and Ankaragücü.

He played seven seasons in the Soviet Top League, two with SKA Rostov-on-Don and five with Torpedo Moscow. He later played four seasons in the Russian Premier League, all of them with Torpedo Moscow.

== Death ==
Agashkov died in July 2026, at the age of 63.
