= Oleh Mochulyak =

Ukrainian former professional footballer (born 1974)

Personal information
- Full name: Oleh Leonidovych Mochulyak
- Date of birth: 27 September 1974 (age 52)
- Place of birth: Odesa, Ukrainian SSR
- Height: 1.78 m (5 ft 10 in)
- Position: Forward

Senior career*
Years	Team	Apps	(Gls)
1991–1992	FC Chornomorets Odesa	3	(0)
1992	→FC Chornomorets-2 Odesa (loan)	18	(4)
1993–1994	FC Nyva Ternopil	48	(21)
1994–1996	FC Chornomorets Odesa	16	(2)
1996	→FC Uralmash Yekaterinburg (loan)	16	(4)
1996	→FC Gazovik-Gazprom Izhevsk (loan)	10	(1)
1997	→FC Uralan Elista (loan)	15	(1)
1998–1999	SC Odesa	26	(10)
1999–2000	FC Chornomorets Odesa	64	(7)
1999	→FC Chornomorets-2 Odesa (loan)	4	(1)
2001	SC Tavriya Simferopol	20	(2)
2002	FC Zimbru Chişinău		
2003	FC Ivan Odesa	15	(9)
2004	FC Taraz		
2005	FC Atyrau		
2006	FC Taraz		
2007	FC Atyrau		
2008	FJ Buxoro		
2009–2010	FC Dnister Ovidiopol	24	(5)

International career
1991	USSR U-16		
1993–1994	Ukraine U-21	5	(1)
- * Club domestic league appearances and goals

Oleh Leonidovych Mochulyak (Ukrainian: Олег Леонідович Мочуляк, romanized: Oleh Leonidovych Mochuliak; Russian: Олег Леонидович Мочуляк; born 27 September 1974) is a Ukrainian former professional footballer. In 2008, he played for FJ Buxoro.

== Careere ==
He took part in the 1991 UEFA European Under-16 Championship along with the Soviet team.

== Personal life ==
He has a son, Renat, who is also a footballer.

== European club competitions ==
- UEFA Intertoto Cup 1996 with FC Uralmash Yekaterinburg: 3 games.
- UEFA Cup 2002–03 with FC Zimbru Chişinău: 2 games.
