= Radik Yamlikhanov =

Russian footballer

Personal information
- Full name: Radik Ramilyevich Yamlikhanov
- Date of birth: 30 January 1968 (age 58)
- Place of birth: Karmakaly, Russian SFSR
- Height: 1.79 m (5 ft 10 in)
- Position: Midfielder

Team information
- Current team: PFC CSKA Moscow (assistant coach)

Senior career*
Years	Team	Apps	(Gls)
1988–1989	FC Iskra Smolensk	69	(4)
1990	FC Dynamo Kyiv	0	(0)
1990–1991	FC Fakel Voronezh	49	(7)
1992–1996	FC Uralmash Yekaterinburg	138	(10)
1997–2001	FC Fakel Voronezh	144	(5)
2002	FC Metallurg Lipetsk	15	(0)
2002	FC Neftekhimik Nizhnekamsk	6	(0)
2003	FC Ural Sverdlovsk Oblast	12	(0)
2004	FC Dynamo Voronezh		

Managerial career
- 2004: FC Dynamo Voronezh (assistant)
- 2006: FC Irtysh Pavlodar (assistant)
- 2008: FC Naftovyk-Ukrnafta Okhtyrka (assistant)
- 2008–2009: FC Naftovyk-Ukrnafta Okhtyrka
- 2009–2010: FC Fakel Voronezh
- 2013–2014: FC Vybor-Kurbatovo Voronezh
- 2018–2020: FC Orenburg (assistant)
- 2020–2022: PFC Sochi (assistant)
- 2022–: PFC CSKA Moscow (assistant)
- * Club domestic league appearances and goals

Radik Ramilyevich Yamlikhanov (Russian: Радик Рамильевич Ямлиханов; born 30 January 1968) is a Russian professional football coach and a former player. He is an assistant coach with PFC CSKA Moscow.

== Playing career ==
As a player, he made his professional debut in the Soviet Second League in 1988 for FC Iskra Smolensk. He played 5 games and scored 1 goal in the UEFA Intertoto Cup 1996 for FC Uralmash Yekaterinburg.

== Personal life ==
His son Robert Yamlikhanov is a professional football player.
