= Yevgeni Yefremov (footballer, born 1970) =

Russian footballer and coach

Personal information
- Full name: Yevgeni Borisovich Yefremov
- Date of birth: 30 June 1970 (age 56)
- Place of birth: Kazan, Russian SFSR
- Height: 1.75 m (5 ft 9 in)
- Position: Defender

Senior career*
| Years | Team | Apps | (Gls) |
| 1988 | FC Torpedo Naberezhnye Chelny | 23 | (0) |
| 1990–1991 | FC KAMAZ Naberezhnye Chelny | 64 | (0) |
| 1992–1994 | FC Neftekhimik Nizhnekamsk | 99 | (3) |
| 1995–1998 | FC KAMAZ-Chally Naberezhnye Chelny | 105 | (0) |
| 1998–1999 | FC Neftekhimik Nizhnekamsk | 51 | (0) |
| 2000 | FC Rubin Kazan | 1 | (0) |
| 2000–2005 | FC Neftekhimik Nizhnekamsk | 138 | (1) |

Managerial career
- 2012–2016: FC KAMAZ Naberezhnye Chelny (assistant)
- 2016–2017: FC Neftekhimik Nizhnekamsk (assistant)
- 2017–2018: FC KAMAZ Naberezhnye Chelny (assistant)
- 2018–2019: FC KAMAZ Naberezhnye Chelny
- * Club domestic league appearances and goals

Yevgeni Borisovich Yefremov (Russian: Евгений Борисович Ефремов; born 30 June 1970) is a Russian professional football coach and a former player.

== Club career ==
He made his professional debut in the Soviet Second League in 1988 for FC Torpedo Naberezhnye Chelny. He played six games in the UEFA Intertoto Cup 1996 for FC KAMAZ-Chally Naberezhnye Chelny.
