= Ayrat Karimov =

Russian footballer (1971–2020)

Personal information
- Full name: Ayrat Naziorovich Karimov
- Date of birth: 4 May 1971
- Place of birth: Kamensk-Shakhtinsky, Russian SFSR
- Date of death: 24 February 2020 (aged 48)
- Height: 1.91 m (6 ft 3 in)
- Position: Goalkeeper

Youth career
- FC Progress Kamensk-Shakhtinsky

Senior career*
Years	Team	Apps	(Gls)
1987–1988	FC Rostselmash Rostov-on-Don	1	(0)
1989	FC Shakhtyor Shakhty	7	(0)
1989–1990	FC SKA Rostov-on-Don	36	(0)
1991–1995	FC Torpedo Taganrog	126	(0)
1996–1998	FC Rotor Volgograd	4	(0)
1996–1997	→ FC Rotor-d Volgograd	8	(0)
1999–2000	PFC Spartak Nalchik	29	(0)
2001	FC Zhenis	0	(0)
2001–2003	FC Shakhter Karagandy	67	(0)
2004	FC Alma-Ata	11	(0)
2005	FC Petrotrest St. Petersburg	6	(0)
- * Club domestic league appearances and goals

Ayrat Naziorovich Karimov (Russian: Айрат Назиорович Каримов; 4 May 1971 – 24 February 2020) was a Russian professional footballer.

== Club career ==
Karimov made his professional debut in the Soviet First League in 1987 for FC Rostselmash Rostov-on-Don. He played 1 game in the UEFA Intertoto Cup 1996 for FC Rotor Volgograd.

== Death ==
Karimov died on 24 February 2020 at the age of 48.
