= Pavel Prygunov =

Russian footballer

Personal information
- Full name: Pavel Vladimirovich Prygunov
- Date of birth: 1 October 1976 (age 50)
- Place of birth: Kazan, Russian SFSR
- Height: 1.71 m (5 ft 7 1/2 in)
- Positions: Midfielder; forward

Senior career*
Years	Team	Apps	(Gls)
1994	FC Rubin Kazan	25	(0)
1995–1997	FC KAMAZ-Chally Naberezhnye Chelny	26	(1)
1997	FC Neftekhimik Nizhnekamsk	12	(0)
1998	FC KAMAZ-Chally Naberezhnye Chelny	36	(1)
1999	FC Uralan Elista	0	(0)
1999–2002	FC KAMAZ-Chally Naberezhnye Chelny	99	(13)
2003	FC Metallurg-Metiznik Magnitogorsk	12	(0)
2003–2004	FC Gazovik Orenburg	32	(1)
2005	FC Energetik Uren	17	(0)
- * Club domestic league appearances and goals

Pavel Vladimirovich Prygunov (Russian: Павел Владимирович Прыгунов; born 1 October 1976) is a former Russian professional footballer.

== Club career ==
He made his professional debut in the Russian Second Division in 1994 for FC Rubin Kazan. He played 5 games in the UEFA Intertoto Cup 1996 for FC KAMAZ-Chally Naberezhnye Chelny.
