= Vladimir Pchelnikov =

Russian footballer

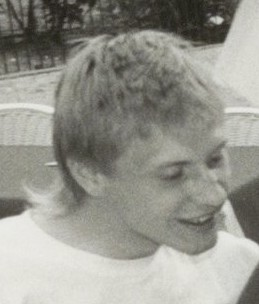

Personal information
- Full name: Vladimir Vladimirovich Pchelnikov
- Date of birth: 30 March 1970 (age 56)
- Place of birth: Kandalaksha, Russian SFSR
- Height: 1.88 m (6 ft 2 in)
- Position: Goalkeeper

Team information
- Current team: WFC Lokomotiv Moscow (U-21 GK coach)

Youth career
- DYuSSh Kandalaksha

Senior career*
Years	Team	Apps	(Gls)
1986–1988	FC Spartak Moscow	3	(0)
1989–1997	FC Torpedo Moscow	105	(0)
1998	FC Tom Tomsk	25	(0)
1999–2001	FC Fakel Voronezh	26	(0)
2002	FC Volgar-Gazprom Astrakhan	12	(0)
2003	FC Spartak Lukhovitsy	4	(0)
2003	FC Chkalovets-1936 Novosibirsk	10	(0)
2004	FC Vidnoye	16	(0)
2005–2006	FC Saturn Yegoryevsk	5	(0)
2006–2007	FC Torpedo-RG Moscow	5	(0)
2007	FC Trud Voronezh		

Managerial career
- 2008–2009: FC Dynamo Moscow (youth teams GK coach)
- 2010–2012: FC Spartak Moscow (reserves GK coach)
- 2013–2014: FC Spartak-2 Moscow (GK coach)
- 2014: FC Torpedo Moscow (reserves asst)
- 2014–2015: FC Rostov (GK coach)
- 2017–2019: FC Spartak Moscow (U-21 GK coach)
- 2019–2021: FC Spartak-2 Moscow (GK coach)
- 2019–2023: Russia U-21 (GK coach)
- 2023–2024: FC Shinnik Yaroslavl (GK coach)
- 2024–: WFC Lokomotiv Moscow (U-21 GK coach)
- * Club domestic league appearances and goals

Vladimir Vladimirovich Pchelnikov (Russian: Владимир Владимирович Пчельников; born 30 March 1970) is a Russian professional football coach and a former player. He works as a goalkeeping coach for the under-21 squad of the women's club WFC Lokomotiv Moscow.

== Club career ==
He made his professional debut in the Soviet Top League in 1988 for FC Spartak Moscow. He played 4 games in the UEFA Cup 1996–97 for FC Torpedo Moscow.

== Honours ==
- Russian Cup winner: 1993.
