= Vladimir Baryshev =

Russian footballer and coach

Personal information
- Full name: Vladimir Leonidovich Baryshev
- Date of birth: 10 January 1960 (age 66)
- Place of birth: Sokolki, Russian SFSR
- Height: 1.78 m (5 ft 10 in)
- Position: Midfielder

Senior career*
Years	Team	Apps	(Gls)
1977–1982	FC Turbina Naberezhnye Chelny		
1983–1985	FC Rubin Kazan		
1986–1987	FC Turbina Naberezhnye Chelny	36	(4)
1988–1989	FC Rubin Kazan	92	(24)
1989–1993	FC KAMAZ Naberezhnye Chelny	35	(6)
1993	FC KamAZavtotsentr Naberezhnye Chelny	34	(1)
1994	FC Neftekhimik Nizhnekamsk	2	(0)
1995	FC KAMAZ-Chally-d Naberezhnye Chelny	11	(0)
1995	FC Rubin Kazan	15	(0)
1996	FC KAMAZ-Chally Naberezhnye Chelny	15	(2)
1999	FC KAMAZ-Chally Naberezhnye Chelny		

Managerial career
- 1997: FC KAMAZ-Chally Naberezhnye Chelny (assistant)
- 2003–2009: FC KAMAZ Naberezhnye Chelny (assistant)
- * Club domestic league appearances and goals

Vladimir Leonidovich Baryshev (Russian: Владимир Леонидович Барышев; born 10 January 1960) is a Russian professional football coach and a former player.

== Career ==
He made his professional debut in the Soviet Second League in 1977 for FC Turbina Naberezhnye Chelny. He played 6 games in the UEFA Intertoto Cup 1996 for FC KAMAZ-Chally Naberezhnye Chelny.
