= Vladimir Klontsak (footballer, born 1968) =

Russian footballer and coach (born 1968)

Personal information
- Full name: Vladimir Yaroslavovich Klontsak
- Date of birth: 27 February 1968 (age 58)
- Place of birth: Bugulma, Russian SFSR
- Height: 1.84 m (6 ft 1/2 in)
- Position: Defender

Team information
- Current team: KAMAZ Naberezhnye Chelny (assistant manager)

Youth career
- DYuSSh-2 Bugulma

Senior career*
Years	Team	Apps	(Gls)
1986–1987	Turbina Brezhnev	42	(7)
1988–1989	Rubin Kazan	42	(5)
1990–1997	KAMAZ Naberezhnye Chelny	243	(14)
1998–1999	Lokomotiv Nizhny Novgorod	23	(0)
1999–2003	Neftekhimik Nizhnekamsk	54	(0)

Managerial career
- 2001–2004: Neftekhimik Nizhnekamsk (assistant)
- 2004: Neftekhimik Nizhnekamsk (caretaker)
- 2004–2005: Neftekhimik Nizhnekamsk
- 2004–2005: Neftekhimik Nizhnekamsk (assistant)
- 2005–2009: Neftekhimik Nizhnekamsk
- 2009–2011: KAMAZ Naberezhnye Chelny (assistant)
- 2011–2016: KAMAZ Naberezhnye Chelny
- 2016–2017: KAMAZ Naberezhnye Chelny
- 2021–2024: KAMAZ Naberezhnye Chelny
- 2024–: KAMAZ Naberezhnye Chelny (assistant)
- * Club domestic league appearances and goals

Vladimir Yaroslavovich Klontsak (Russian: Владимир Ярославович Клонцак; born 27 February 1968) is a Russian professional football coach and a former player who is the assistant manager of KAMAZ Naberezhnye Chelny.

== Club career ==
As a player, he made his debut in the Soviet Second League in 1986 for Turbina Brezhnev. He played 6 games and scored 2 goals in the UEFA Intertoto Cup 1996 for KAMAZ Naberezhnye Chelny.

== Personal life ==
Klontsak's son, Vladimir Vladimirovich Klontsak, also played football professionally.
