= Ilya Ratnichkin =

Russian footballer

Personal information
- Full name: Ilya Aleksandrovich Ratnichkin
- Date of birth: 6 June 1973 (age 53)
- Place of birth: Sverdlovsk, Russian SFSR
- Height: 1.77 m (5 ft 9 1/2 in)
- Position: Defender

Youth career
- FC Metallurg Verkhnyaya Pyshma

Senior career*
Years	Team	Apps	(Gls)
1990	FC Uralmash Sverdlovsk	1	(0)
1993–1996	FC Uralmash Yekaterinburg	98	(0)
1997	FC Lokomotiv Nizhny Novgorod	6	(0)
1997–1998	FC Uralmash Yekaterinburg	47	(3)
1999	FC Chkalovets-Olimpik Novosibirsk (amateur)		
2001	FC Chkalovets-Olimpik Novosibirsk	16	(0)
2002–2003	FC Ural Yekaterinburg	33	(1)

Managerial career
- 2006: FC Ural Sverdlovsk Oblast (VP of security)
- 2007: FC Ural Sverdlovsk Oblast (caretaker president)
- * Club domestic league appearances and goals

Ilya Aleksandrovich Ratnichkin (Russian: Илья Александрович Ратничкин; born 6 June 1973) is a former Russian professional footballer.

== Club career ==
He made his professional debut in the Soviet Second League in 1990 for FC Uralmash Sverdlovsk. He played 5 games in the UEFA Intertoto Cup 1996 for FC Uralmash Yekaterinburg.
