= Andrei Samorukov =

Russian footballer

Personal information
- Full name: Andrei Nikolayevich Samorukov
- Date of birth: 30 May 1970 (age 56)
- Place of birth: Moscow, Russia
- Height: 1.83 m (6 ft 0 in)
- Position: Goalkeeper

Team information
- Current team: FC Lokomotiv Moscow (U20 GK coach)

Youth career
- EShVSM Moscow

Senior career*
Years	Team	Apps	(Gls)
1987–1990	FC Zvezda Moscow	39	(0)
1990–1991	FC Fakel Voronezh	41	(0)
1992	FC Dynamo Moscow	0	(0)
1992–1993	FC Tekstilshchik Kamyshin	57	(0)
1994–1997	FC Rotor Volgograd	94	(0)
1997	FC Metallurg Lipetsk	16	(0)
1998	FC Uralan Elista	25	(0)
1999	FC Dynamo Moscow	1	(0)
1999–2001	FC Saturn Ramenskoye	28	(0)
2002	FC Chernomorets Novorossiysk	18	(0)
2003–2004	FC Khimki	32	(0)
2004	FC Sodovik Sterlitamak	10	(0)
2005	FC Fakel Voronezh	26	(0)
Total		387	(0)

Managerial career
- 2008–2011: PFC CSKA Moscow (reserves GK coach)
- 2019–: FC Lokomotiv Moscow (U20 GK coach)
- * Club domestic league appearances and goals

Andrei Nikolayevich Samorukov (Russian: Андрей Николаевич Саморуков; born 30 May 1970) is a Russian professional football coach and a former player. He is the goalkeepers' coach with the Under-20 squad of FC Lokomotiv Moscow.

== Club career ==
He made his professional debut in the Soviet Second League in 1987 for SK EShVSM Moscow.

== Honours ==
- Russian Premier League bronze: 1996.
- Russian Cup finalist: 1995.

== European club competitions ==
With FC Rotor Volgograd.

- UEFA Cup 1994–95: 2 games.
- UEFA Cup 1995–96: 4 games.
- UEFA Intertoto Cup 1996: 8 games.
