= Ihor Zhabchenko =

Ukrainian footballer (born 1968)

Ihor Zhabchenko Ігор Жабченко
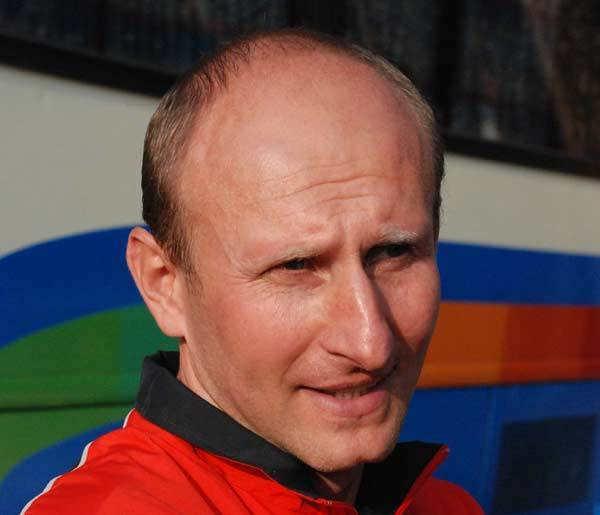

Personal information
- Full name: Ihor Valentynovych Zhabchenko
- Date of birth: 1 July 1968 (age 58)
- Place of birth: Kyiv, Ukrainian SSR
- Height: 1.78 m (5 ft 10 in)
- Positions: Defender; midfielder

Youth career
- Dynamo Kyiv

Senior career*
Years	Team	Apps	(Gls)
1987–1988	Dynamo Kyiv	0	(0)
1989	Dynamo Bila Tserkva	4	(0)
1990	Zenit Leningrad	3	(0)
1990–1993	Kremin Kremenchuk	107	(23)
1993–1996	Chornomorets Odesa	84	(12)
1996	Bnei Yehuda Tel Aviv	3	(0)
1996	Rotor Volgograd	3	(0)
1997	Hirnyk Komsomolsk	6	(0)
1997	Shakhtar Donetsk	9	(0)
1997	→ Shakhtar-2 Donetsk	6	(0)
1998	Mykolaiv	12	(1)
1999	Metalurh Donetsk	6	(1)
1999–2001	Metallurg Krasnoyarsk	18	(0)
2001–2002	Systema-Boreks Borodianka	1	(0)
Total		256	(37)

International career
1992–1996	Ukraine	11	(0)

Managerial career
- 2001–2002: Systema-Boreks Borodianka (assistant)
- 2003–2008: Ukraine U16
- 2008–2010: Zirka Kirovohrad
- 2010–2011: Sumy
- 2011: Zirka Kirovohrad
- 2013–2016: Hirnyk-Sport Komsomolsk
- 2019–2022: Hirnyk-Sport Horishni Plavni
- 2023: Nyva Buzova
- * Club domestic league appearances and goals

Ihor Zhabchenko (Ukrainian: Ігор Валентинович Жабченко; born 1 July 1968) is a Ukrainian former professional football player and a manager.

== Playing career ==
Zhabchenko made his professional debut in the Soviet Second League in 1989, for Dynamo Bila Tserkva. He played seven games in the 1996 UEFA Intertoto Cup for Rotor Volgograd.

== Coaching career ==
From 2013 to 2016, Zhabchenko was a manager of Hirnyk-Sport Komsomolsk.

== Honours ==
- Ukrainian Premier League runner-up: 1996
- Russian Premier League bronze: 1996
