= Igor Khankeyev =

Russian footballer and coach

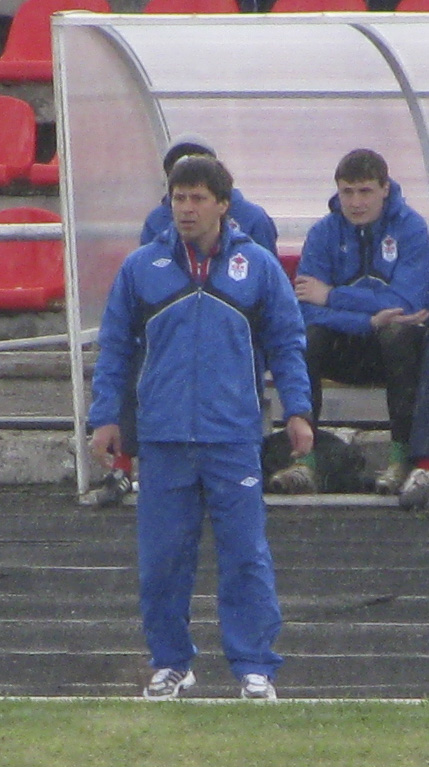

Personal information
- Full name: Igor Fyodorovich Khankeyev
- Date of birth: 4 February 1968 (age 58)
- Place of birth: Omsk, Russian SFSR
- Height: 1.73 m (5 ft 8 in)
- Position: Midfielder

Youth career
- DYuSSh-14 Omsk

Senior career*
Years	Team	Apps	(Gls)
1985	FC Irtysh Omsk	8	(0)
1987–1988	SKA Novosibirsk		
1989–1990	FC Irtysh Omsk	78	(10)
1991–1996	FC Uralmash Yekaterinburg	176	(35)
1997–2000	FC Rostselmash Rostov-on-Don	103	(17)
2001	FC Volgar-Gazprom Astrakhan	17	(1)
2001	FC Lokomotiv Nizhny Novgorod	4	(0)
2001	FC Bataysk (amateur)		
2002	FC Irtysh Omsk	22	(1)

Managerial career
- 2003–2004: FC Ural Yekaterinburg (assistant)
- 2005–2006: FC Petrotrest St. Petersburg (assistant)
- 2006–2008: FC Taganrog (assistant)
- 2009–2012: FC SKA Rostov-on-Don
- 2013: FC Donenergo Aksay
- 2014: FC Dynamo St. Petersburg (assistant)
- 2014–2017: FC Fakel Voronezh (assistant)
- * Club domestic league appearances and goals

Igor Fyodorovich Khankeyev (Russian: Игорь Фёдорович Ханкеев; born 4 February 1968) is a Russian professional football coach and a former player.

== Club career ==
He made his professional debut in the Soviet Second League in 1985 for FC Irtysh Omsk. He then played for SKA Novosibirsk (1987-1988), FC Irtysh Omsk (1989-1990), FC Uralmash Yekaterinburg (1991-1996), FC Rostselmash Rostov-on-Don (1997-2000), FC Volgar-Gazprom Astrakhan (2001), FC Lokomotiv Nizhny Novgorod (2001), and FC Bataysk (amateur) (2001). He finished his playing career with FC Irtysh Omsk in 2002, where he made 22 appearances and scored 1 goal.

After retiring as a player, Khankeyev moved into coaching and worked as an assistant manager at several clubs including FC Ural Yekaterinburg (2003-2004), FC Petrotrest St. Petersburg (2005-2006), FC Taganrog (2006-2008), and FC Dynamo St. Petersburg (2014). He also managed FC SKA Rostov-on-Don (2009-2012), FC Donenergo Aksay (2013), and FC Fakel Voronezh (2014-2017).

In conclusion, Igor Khankeyev had a successful football career as both a player and coach. He played for several clubs across Russia and helped many teams as a coach.

== European club competitions ==
- UEFA Intertoto Cup 1996 with FC Uralmash Yekaterinburg: 4 games, 1 goal.
- UEFA Intertoto Cup 1999 with FC Rostselmash Rostov-on-Don: 4 games, 1 goal.
- UEFA Intertoto Cup 2000 with FC Rostselmash Rostov-on-Don: 1 game.
