= FC FSA Voronezh =

Russian association football club

- Full name: Football Club FSA Voronezh
- Founded: 2008
- Dissolved: 2010
- Ground: Tsentralnyi Profsoyuz Stadion, Voronezh
- Capacity: 31,793
- League: Russian Second Division
- 2009: 11th
Home colours	Away colours

FC FSA Voronezh (Russian: ФК ФСА Воронеж) was a Russian football club from Voronezh. It was founded as FC Fakel-StroyArt Voronezh in 2008, after the most successful team from Voronezh, FC Fakel Voronezh, was relegated into the Amateur Football League. Fakel-StroyArt advanced to the Russian Second Division in their first season. In early 2009, another Voronezh team, FC FCS-73 Voronezh, received support from the local authorities and was renamed to FC Fakel-Voronezh Voronezh. FC Fakel-StroyArt renamed themselves to FC FSA to avoid conflicts with the other Fakel. In March 2010, the club was excluded from the Second Division.
