= Igor Reshetnikov =

Russian footballer

Personal information
- Full name: Igor Sergeyevich Reshetnikov
- Date of birth: 22 May 1975 (age 51)
- Place of birth: Vyatskiye Polyany, Russian SFSR
- Height: 1.87 m (6 ft 2 in)
- Position: Defender

Team information
- Current team: FC Ural-2 Yekaterinburg (assistant coach)

Senior career*
Years	Team	Apps	(Gls)
1992–1993	FC Elektron Vyatskiye Polyany	23	(0)
1994–2005	FC Ural Yekaterinburg	190	(3)
2005	FC Metallurg Lipetsk	20	(0)
2006	FC Zenit Chelyabinsk	22	(1)
2007	FC Sodovik Sterlitamak	19	(0)
2007–2009	FC Dynamo Kirov	63	(1)

Managerial career
- 2021–2024: FC Ural Yekaterinburg (U19 assistant)
- 2025: FC Ural-2 Yekaterinburg (assistant)
- 2025: FC Ural-2 Yekaterinburg (caretaker)
- 2025–: FC Ural-2 Yekaterinburg (assistant)
- * Club domestic league appearances and goals

Igor Sergeyevich Reshetnikov (Russian: Игорь Серге́евич Решетников; born 22 May 1975) is a Russian professional football coach and a former player. He is an assistant coach for FC Ural-2 Yekaterinburg.

== Club career ==
He made his debut in the Russian Premier League in 1996 for FC Uralmash Yekaterinburg.
