= FC Dynamo Kostroma =

Russian football club

- Full name: Football Club Dynamo Kostroma
- Founded: 1926
- Ground: Urozhay Stadium
- 2011–12: Russian Second Division; Zone West, 14th (relegated)
Home colours	Away colours

FC Dynamo Kostroma (Russian: ФК "Дина́мо Кострома́") is an association football club from Kostroma, Russia, founded in 1926. It played in 2010 and 2011–12 seasons, in the Russian Second Division.
