= FC Turbina Naberezhnye Chelny =

- Full name: Football Club Turbina Naberezhnye Chelny
- Founded: 1973
- Dissolved: 2002
- League: Russian Amateur Football League

FC Turbina Naberezhnye Chelny (Russian: «Турбина» Набережные Челны) was a Russian football team from Naberezhnye Chelny.

It played professionally in the third-tier Soviet Second League from 1977 to 1987. Their best result was 8th spot in their zone in 1983.

== Team name history ==
- 1973–1983: FC Turbina Naberezhnye Chelny
- 1982–1987: FC Turbina Brezhnev (the city was renamed temporarily)
- 2000: FC Turbina-KamGIFK Naberezhnye Chelny
- 2001: FC Turbina Naberezhnye Chelny
