= FC Uralets-TS Nizhny Tagil =

- Full name: Football Club Uralets-TS Nizhny Tagil
- Founded: 1946
- Chairman: Damir Kalimullin
- Manager: Vacant
- League: Russian Amateur Football League
- 2025: Russian Second League, Division B, Group 4, 5th
- Website: fc-uralec.ru

FC Uralets-TS Nizhny Tagil (Russian: ФК «Уралец-ТС» Нижний Тагил) is a Russian football team from Nizhny Tagil.

It played professionally from 1946 to 1949, from 1958 to 2006 and from 2023 on. The highest level it ever achieved was the second-highest (Soviet First League and Russian First Division), where it played in 1947–1949, 1958–1962 and 1992–1993. The team was called Dzerzhinets Nizhny Tagil (1946–1957) and Metallurg Nizhny Tagil (1958–1961). "TS" in "Uralets-TS" stands for the club's sponsor, Tagil Steel holding company (Russian: Тагильская Сталь) and was added to the club's name in 2021.

The club re-entered professional football in the 2023–24 season and was admitted to the newly organized fourth-tier Russian Second League Division B.

On 12 October 2023, a car with four Uralets-TS players was involved in an accident, midfielder Yevgeny Sitnikov died, Kirill Kochetov was hospitalized in a coma, and Denis Fedorochev and Kirill Mylnikov were seriously injured. Kirill Kochetov died without regaining consciousness on 1 November 2023.

In November 2025, the club announced that it will drop out of the Russian Second League due to lack of financing.
