= Gazzayev =

Gazzayev (Russian: Газзаев) is a masculine surname originating in Ossetia, its feminine counterpart is Gazzayeva. It may refer to

- Azamat Gazzayev (born 1997), Russian football player
- Ruslan Gazzayev (born 1991), Russian football player, son of Yuri
- Valery Gazzaev (born 1954), Russian football manager and former player, father of Vladimir
- Vladimir Gazzayev (born 1980), Russian football coach and a former player, son of Valery
- Yuri Gazzaev (born 1960), cousin of Valery and father of Ruslan Gazzaev
