= March 14 =

March 14 this year in various calendars
- Saturday, 14 March 2026
Akan	Nkyimemene
Armenian	27 Areg 1475
Aztec	Huei Tecuilhuitl 3, 12 Ozomahtli
Babylonian	24 Shabatu, 2336 SE
Balinese pawukon	Luang, Pepet, Kajeng, Jaya, Keliwon, Urukung, Saniscara of Wayang, Guru, Erangan, Raja
Bengali	29 Falgun, BS 1432
Chinese	Yin Fire Pig・Girl Mansion; Fire Horse Year, Month 1, Day 26 (Jingzhe, 6 days until Chunfen)
Common Era	14 March 2026 CE
Coptic	5 Paremhat, AM 1742
Egyptian	2 Mesori, 2774 NE
Ethiopian	5 Magābit, 2018 Amätä Məhrät
French Republican	Décade III, Quartidi de Ventôse de l'Année 234 de la République
Gregorian	14 March, AD 2026
Hebrew	25 Adar, AM 5786
Hindu	Uttarāṣāḍha・Varīyas; Solar: 1 Caitra, 1947 SE; Lunisolar: Ekādaśī, Kṛishna pakṣa of Phālguna, 2082 VE; Rāudra・5126 KY・1,872,648
Icelandic	Laugardagur, 21 Góa 2025
Islamic	25 Ramadan, AH 1447 (using tabular method)
ISO week date	2026-W11-6
Japanese	26 Mutsuki, Reiwa 8 (Keichitsu, 6 days until Shunbun)
Julian	1 March, AD 2026 (AM 7534)
Julian day	2461114
Korean	26 Horangidal, 4359 DE
Maya	13.0.13.7.11; 9 Cumku, 12 Chuen
Roman	Kalendis Martiis, MMDCCLXXIX AUC
Solar Hijri	23 Esfand, SH 1404
Tibetan	26 mchu, me pho rta 2153 or 1772 or 1000

<<	March					>>
Su	Mo	Tu	We	Th	Fr	Sa
1	2	3	4	5	6	7
8	9	10	11	12	13	14
15	16	17	18	19	20	21
22	23	24	25	26	27	28
29	30	31
2026

March 14 in recent years
2026 (Saturday)
2025 (Friday)
2024 (Thursday)
2023 (Tuesday)
2022 (Monday)
2021 (Sunday)
2020 (Saturday)
2019 (Thursday)
2018 (Wednesday)
2017 (Tuesday)

March 14 is the 73rd day of the year (74th in leap years) in the Gregorian calendar; 292 days remain until the end of the year.

== Events ==
=== Pre-1600 ===
- 1074 – Battle of Mogyoród: Dukes Géza and Ladislaus defeat their cousin Solomon, King of Hungary, forcing him to flee to Hungary's western borderland.
- 1590 – Battle of Ivry: Henry of Navarre and the Huguenots defeat the forces of the Catholic League under Charles, Duke of Mayenne, during the French Wars of Religion.

=== 1601–1900 ===
- 1647 – Thirty Years' War: Bavaria, Cologne, France and Sweden sign the Truce of Ulm.
- 1663 – According to his own account, Otto von Guericke completes his book Experimenta Nova (ut vocantur) Magdeburgica de Vacuo Spatio, detailing his experiments on vacuum and his discovery of electrostatic repulsion.
- 1674 – The Third Anglo-Dutch War: The Battle of Ronas Voe results in the Dutch East India Company ship Wapen van Rotterdam being captured with a death toll of up to 300 Dutch crew and soldiers.
- 1757 – Admiral Sir John Byng is executed by firing squad aboard HMS Monarch for breach of the Articles of War.
- 1780 – American Revolutionary War: Spanish forces capture Fort Charlotte in Mobile, Alabama, the last British frontier post capable of threatening New Orleans.
- 1794 – Eli Whitney is granted a patent for the cotton gin.
- 1864 – Rossini's Petite messe solennelle is first performed, by twelve singers, two pianists and a harmonium player in a mansion in Paris.
- 1885 – The Mikado, a light opera by W. S. Gilbert and Arthur Sullivan, receives its first public performance at the Savoy Theatre in London.
- 1900 – The Gold Standard Act is ratified, placing the United States currency on the gold standard.

=== 1901–present ===
- 1901 – Utah governor Heber Manning Wells vetoes a bill that would have eased restrictions on polygamy.
- 1903 – Pelican Island National Wildlife Refuge, the first national wildlife refuge in the US, is established by President Theodore Roosevelt.
- 1916 – Battle of Verdun: German attack captures Côte 265 at the west end of Mort-Homme but the French 75th Infantry Brigade manages to hold Côte 295 at the east end.
- 1920 – In the second of the 1920 Schleswig plebiscites, about 80% of the population in Zone II votes to remain part of Weimar Germany.
- 1921 – Six members of a group of Irish Republican Army activists known as the Forgotten Ten are hanged in Dublin's Mountjoy Prison.
- 1923 – Charlie Daly and three other members of the Irish Republican Army are executed by Irish Free State forces.
- 1926 – The El Virilla train accident, Costa Rica, kills 248 people and wounds another 93 when a train falls off a bridge over the Río Virilla between Heredia and Tibás.
- 1931 – Alam Ara, India's first talking film, is released.
- 1939 – Slovakia declares independence under German pressure.
- 1942 – Anne Miller becomes the first American patient to be treated with penicillin, under the care of Orvan Hess and John Bumstead.
- 1943 – The Holocaust: The liquidation of the Kraków Ghetto is completed.
- 1945 – The R.A.F. drop the Grand Slam bomb in action for the first time, on a railway viaduct near Bielefeld, Germany.
- 1951 – Korean War: United Nations troops recapture Seoul for the second time.
- 1961 – A USAF B-52 bomber carrying nuclear weapons crashes near Yuba City, California.
- 1964 – Jack Ruby is convicted of killing Lee Harvey Oswald, the assassin who had shot and killed John F. Kennedy the previous year.
- 1967 – The body of U.S. President John F. Kennedy is moved to a permanent burial place at Arlington National Cemetery.
- 1972 – Sterling Airways Flight 296 crashes near Kalba, United Arab Emirates while on approach to Dubai International Airport, killing 112 people.
- 1978 – The Israel Defense Forces launch Operation Litani, a seven-day campaign to invade and occupy southern Lebanon.
- 1979 – Alia Royal Jordanian Flight 600 crashes at Doha International Airport, killing 45 people.
- 1980 – LOT Polish Airlines Flight 007 crashes during final approach near Warsaw, Poland, killing 87 people, including a 14-man American boxing team.
- 1982 – The South African government bombs the headquarters of the African National Congress in London.
- 1988 – In the Johnson South Reef Skirmish Chinese forces defeat Vietnamese forces in an altercation over control of one of the Spratly Islands.
- 1991 – Escondida in Chile's Atacama Desert – which was to become the worlds most productive copper mine – is officially inaugurated.
- 1995 – Norman Thagard becomes the first American astronaut to ride to space on board a Russian launch vehicle.
- 2006 – The 2006 Chadian coup d'état attempt ends in failure.
- 2006 – Operation Bringing Home the Goods: Israeli troops raid an American-supervised Palestinian prison in Jericho to capture six Palestinian prisoners, including PFLP chief Ahmad Sa'adat.
- 2007 – The Nandigram violence in Nandigram, West Bengal, results in the deaths of at least 14 people.
- 2008 – A series of riots, protests, and demonstrations erupt in Lhasa and subsequently spread elsewhere in Tibet.
- 2017 – A naming ceremony for the chemical element nihonium takes place in Tokyo, with then Crown Prince Naruhito in attendance.
- 2019 – Cyclone Idai makes landfall near Beira, Mozambique, causing devastating floods and over 1,000 deaths.
- 2021 – Burmese security forces kill at least 65 civilians in the Hlaingthaya massacre.

== Births ==
=== Pre-1600 ===
- 1297 – Uljay Qutlugh Khatun, Mongol empress consort of the Ilkhanate.

=== 1601–1900 ===
- 1638 – Johann Georg Gichtel, German mystic (died 1710)
- 1737 – Ioan Nicolidi of Pindus, Aromanian physician and noble (died 1828)
- 1772 – José Núñez de Cáceres, Dominican politician and writer. He was the leader of the Independence movement of the Dominican Republic against Spain in 1821 (died 1846)
- 1790 – Ludwig Emil Grimm, German painter and engraver (died 1863)
- 1800 – James Bogardus, American inventor and architect (died 1874)
- 1801 – Kristjan Jaak Peterson, Estonian poet (died 1822)
- 1804 – Johann Strauss I, Austrian composer and conductor (died 1849)
- 1813 – Joseph P. Bradley, American lawyer and jurist (died 1892)
- 1820 – Victor Emmanuel II of Italy (died 1878)
- 1822 – Teresa Cristina of the Two Sicilies (died 1889)
- 1823 – Théodore de Banville, French poet and critic (died 1891)
- 1833 – Frederic Shields, English painter and illustrator (died 1911)
- 1833 – Lucy Hobbs Taylor, American dentist and educator (died 1910)
- 1835 – Giovanni Schiaparelli, Italian astronomer and historian (died 1910)
- 1836 – Isabella Beeton, English author of Mrs Beeton's Book of Household Management (died 1865)
- 1837 – Charles Ammi Cutter, American librarian (died 1903)
- 1844 – Umberto I of Italy (died 1900)
- 1844 – Arthur O'Shaughnessy, English poet and herpetologist (died 1881)
- 1847 – Castro Alves, Brazilian poet and playwright (died 1871)
- 1853 – Ferdinand Hodler, Swiss painter (died 1918)
- 1854 – Paul Ehrlich, German physician and biologist, Nobel Prize laureate (died 1915)
- 1854 – John Lane, English publisher, co-founded The Bodley Head (died 1925)
- 1854 – Alexandru Macedonski, Romanian author and poet (died 1920)
- 1854 – Thomas R. Marshall, American lawyer and politician, 28th Vice President of the United States of America (died 1925)
- 1862 – Vilhelm Bjerknes, Norwegian physicist and meteorologist (died 1951)
- 1864 – Casey Jones, American engineer (died 1900)
- 1868 – Emily Murphy, Canadian jurist, author, and activist (died 1933)
- 1869 – Algernon Blackwood, English author and playwright (died 1951)
- 1874 – Anton Philips, Dutch businessman, co-founded Philips Electronics (died 1951)
- 1879 – Albert Einstein, German-American physicist, academic and Nobel Prize laureate (died 1955)
- 1882 – Wacław Sierpiński, Polish mathematician and academic (died 1969)
- 1885 – Raoul Lufbery, French-American soldier and pilot (died 1918)
- 1886 – Firmin Lambot, Belgian cyclist (died 1964)
- 1887 – Sylvia Beach, American-French bookseller and publisher, who founded Shakespeare and Company (died 1962)
- 1898 – Reginald Marsh, French-American painter and illustrator (died 1954)
- 1899 – K. C. Irving, Canadian businessman, founded Irving Oil (died 1992)

=== 1901–present ===
- 1901 – Sid Atkinson, South African hurdler and long jumper (died 1977)
- 1903 – Adolph Gottlieb, American painter and sculptor (died 1974)
- 1904 – Doris Eaton Travis, American actress and dancer (died 2010)
- 1905 – Raymond Aron, French journalist, sociologist, and philosopher (died 1983)
- 1906 – Ulvi Cemal Erkin, Turkish composer and educator (died 1972)
- 1908 – Ed Heinemann, American designer of military aircraft (died 1991)
- 1908 – Maurice Merleau-Ponty, French philosopher and academic (died 1961)
- 1908 – Phil Vincent, English engineer and businessman, founded Vincent Motorcycles (died 1979)
- 1908 – Koča Popović, Yugoslav politician and Divisional Commander of the First Proletarian Division of the Yugoslav Partisans (died 1992)
- 1911 – Akira Yoshizawa, Japanese origamist (died 2005)
- 1912 – Cliff Bastin, English footballer (died 1991)
- 1912 – Les Brown, American saxophonist, composer, and bandleader (died 2001)
- 1912 – W. Graham Claytor Jr. American lieutenant, lawyer, and politician, 15th United States Secretary of the Navy (died 1994)
- 1912 – W. Willard Wirtz, American lawyer and politician, 10th United States Secretary of Labor (died 2010)
- 1913 – Dominik Tatarka, Slovak writer (died 1989)
- 1914 – Lee Hays, American singer-songwriter (died 1981)
- 1914 – Bill Owen, English actor and songwriter (died 1999)
- 1914 – Lee Petty, American race car driver and businessman, founded Petty Enterprises (died 2000)
- 1915 – Alexander Brott, Canadian violinist, composer, and conductor (died 2005)
- 1916 – Horton Foote, American author, playwright, and screenwriter (died 2009)
- 1917 – Alan Smith, English lieutenant and pilot (died 2013)
- 1918 – Zoia Horn, American librarian (died 2014)
- 1919 – Max Shulman, American author and screenwriter (died 1988)
- 1920 – Hank Ketcham, American author and cartoonist, created Dennis the Menace (died 2001)
- 1920 – Dorothy Tyler-Odam, English high jumper (died 2014)
- 1921 – S. Truett Cathy, American businessman, founded Chick-fil-A (died 2014)
- 1921 – Ada Louise Huxtable, American author and critic (died 2013)
- 1922 – Les Baxter, American pianist and composer (died 1996)
- 1923 – Diane Arbus, American photographer (died 1971)
- 1925 – William Clay Ford Sr., American businessman (died 2014)
- 1925 – Francis A. Marzen, Roman Catholic priest (died 2004)
- 1925 – Joseph A. Unanue, American sergeant and businessman (died 2013)
- 1926 – François Morel, Canadian pianist, composer, conductor, and educator (died 2018)
- 1927 – Chuck Share, American basketball player (died 2012)
- 1928 – Frank Borman, American astronaut (died 2023)
- 1928 – Félix Rodríguez de la Fuente, Spanish environmentalist (died 1980)
- 1929 – Bob Goalby, American golfer (died 2022)
- 1932 – Mark Murphy, American singer-songwriter and actor (died 2015)
- 1932 – Naina Yeltsina, Russian wife of Boris Yeltsin, First Lady of Russia
- 1933 – Michael Caine, English actor
- 1933 – Quincy Jones, American producer (died 2024)
- 1934 – Eugene Cernan, American captain, pilot, and astronaut (died 2017)
- 1934 – Paul Rader, American 15th General of The Salvation Army (died 2025)
- 1936 – Bob Charles, New Zealand golfer
- 1937 – Peter van der Merwe, South African cricketer and referee (died 2013)
- 1938 – Eleanor Bron, English actress and screenwriter
- 1938 – Jan Crouch, American televangelist, co-founder of the Trinity Broadcasting Network (died 2016)
- 1938 – John Gleeson, Australian cricketer (died 2016)
- 1938 – Árpád Orbán, Hungarian footballer (died 2008)
- 1939 – Raymond J. Barry, American actor
- 1939 – Bertrand Blier, French director and screenwriter (died 2025)
- 1939 – Yves Boisset, French director and screenwriter (died 2025)
- 1941 – Wolfgang Petersen, German-American director, producer, and screenwriter (died 2022)
- 1942 – Rita Tushingham, English actress
- 1943 – Anita Morris, American actress and singer (died 1994)
- 1944 – Boris Brott, Canadian composer and conductor (died 2022)
- 1944 – Clyde Lee, American basketball player
- 1944 – Václav Nedomanský, Czech ice hockey player and manager
- 1944 – Bobby Smith, English footballer and manager
- 1944 – Tom Stannage, Australian historian and academic (died 2012)
- 1945 – Jasper Carrott, English comedian, actor, and game show host
- 1945 – Michael Martin Murphey, American singer-songwriter and guitarist
- 1945 – Walter Parazaider, American saxophonist
- 1946 – Wes Unseld, American basketball player, coach, and manager (died 2020)
- 1947 – Roy Budd, English pianist and composer (died 1993)
- 1947 – William J. Jefferson, American lawyer and politician
- 1947 – Jona Lewie, English singer-songwriter and keyboard player
- 1948 – Tom Coburn, American physician and politician (died 2020)
- 1948 – Billy Crystal, American actor, comedian, director, producer, and screenwriter
- 1948 – Theo Jansen, Dutch sculptor
- 1950 – Rick Dees, American actor and radio host
- 1951 – Jerry Greenfield, American businessman and philanthropist, co-founded Ben & Jerry's
- 1953 – Nick Keir, Scottish singer-songwriter (died 2013)
- 1954 – Brian Smith, Australian rugby league player and coach
- 1955 – Jonathan Kaufer, American director and screenwriter (died 2013)
- 1956 – Indu Malhotra, Judge of the Supreme Court of India
- 1956 – Butch Wynegar, American baseball player and coach
- 1957 – Tad Williams, American author
- 1958 – Albert II, Prince of Monaco
- 1959 – Laila Robins, American actress
- 1959 – Tamara Tunie, American actress
- 1960 – Heidi Hammel, American astronomer and academic
- 1960 – Kirby Puckett, American baseball player (died 2006)
- 1961 – Mike Lazaridis, Greek–Canadian businessman and philanthropist, founded BlackBerry Limited
- 1963 – Bruce Reid, Australian cricketer and coach
- 1964 – Chris Johns, Australian rugby league player and administrator
- 1965 – Kevin Brown, American baseball player and coach
- 1965 – Aamir Khan, Indian film actor, producer, and director
- 1965 – Billy Sherwood, American guitarist, songwriter, and producer
- 1965 – Kevin Williamson, American actor, director, producer, and screenwriter
- 1966 – Jonas Elmer, Danish actor, director, and screenwriter
- 1966 – Elise Neal, American actress and producer
- 1968 – Megan Follows, Canadian-American actress
- 1968 – Magnús Árni Magnússon, Icelandic politician
- 1969 – Larry Johnson, American basketball player and actor
- 1970 – Kristian Bush, American singer-songwriter and guitarist
- 1972 – Irom Chanu Sharmila, Indian poet and activist
- 1973 – Rohit Shetty, Indian film director and producer
- 1974 – Santino Marella, Canadian wrestler
- 1974 – Patrick Traverse, Canadian ice hockey player
- 1975 – Steve Harper, English footballer and referee
- 1975 – Dmitri Markov, Belarusian-Australian pole vaulter
- 1976 – Brian Quinn, American improvisational comedian and actor
- 1976 – Phil Vickery, English rugby player and sportscaster
- 1977 – Vadims Fjodorovs, Latvian footballer and coach
- 1977 – Naoki Matsuda, Japanese footballer (died 2011)
- 1977 – Jeremy Paul, New Zealand-Australian rugby player
- 1978 – Pieter van den Hoogenband, Dutch swimmer
- 1978 – Viesturs Kleinbergs, Latvian politician
- 1979 – Nicolas Anelka, French footballer and manager
- 1979 – Dan Avidan, American musician and internet personality
- 1979 – Chris Klein, American actor
- 1979 – Sead Ramović, German-Bosnian footballer
- 1980 – Aaron Brown, English footballer and coach
- 1980 – Ben Herring, New Zealand rugby player and coach
- 1981 – Bobby Jenks, American baseball player (died 2025)
- 1981 – George Wilson, American football player
- 1982 – Carlos Marinelli, Argentine footballer
- 1982 – François Sterchele, Belgian footballer (died 2008)
- 1983 – Bakhtiyar Artayev, Kazakh boxer
- 1986 – Elton Chigumbura, Zimbabwean cricketer
- 1986 – Jessica Gallagher, Australian skier and cyclist
- 1986 – Andy Taylor, English footballer
- 1988 – Stephen Curry, American basketball player
- 1988 – Rico Freimuth, German decathlete
- 1989 – Marwin González, Venezuelan baseball player
- 1989 – Kevin Lacroix, Canadian race car driver
- 1989 – Patrick Patterson, American basketball player
- 1990 – Joe Allen, Welsh footballer
- 1990 – Tamás Kádár, Hungarian footballer
- 1990 – Haru Kuroki, Japanese actress
- 1990 – Kolbeinn Sigþórsson, Icelandic footballer
- 1991 – Emir Bekrić, Serbian hurdler
- 1992 – Shotzi Blackheart, American wrestler
- 1992 – Erik Gustafsson, Swedish ice hockey player
- 1993 – Anthony Bennett, Canadian basketball player
- 1993 – J. T. Miller, American ice hockey player
- 1994 – Ansel Elgort, American actor and DJ
- 1995 – Brandon Aubrey, American multi-sport athlete
- 1995 – Nick Eh 30, Canadian live streamer and professional gamer
- 1996 – Batuhan Altıntaş, Turkish footballer
- 1997 – Simone Biles, American gymnast
- 1998 – Tyson Jost, Canadian ice hockey player
- 1999 – Marvin Bagley III, American basketball player
- 1999 – Olivia Dean, English singer-songwriter
- 2000 – Chrisean Rock, American rapper and reality television personality
- 2000 – Jihoon, South Korean singer
- 2001 – Nico Mannion, Italian-American basketball player
- 2008 – Abby Ryder Fortson, American actress

== Deaths ==
=== Pre-1600 ===
- 840 – Einhard, Frankish scholar
- 968 – Matilda of Ringelheim, Saxon queen (born c. 896)
- 1471 – Thomas Malory, English writer, the author of Le Morte d'Arthur
- 1555 – John Russell, 1st Earl of Bedford (born 1485)

=== 1601–1900 ===
- 1647 – Frederick Henry, Prince of Orange (born 1584)
- 1648 – Ferdinando Fairfax, 2nd Lord Fairfax of Cameron, English general and politician (born 1584)
- 1696 – Jean Domat, French lawyer and jurist (born 1625)
- 1698 – Claes Rålamb, Swedish statesman (born 1622)
- 1748 – George Wade, Irish field marshal and politician (born 1673)
- 1757 – John Byng, British admiral and politician, 11th Commodore Governor of Newfoundland (born 1704)
- 1791 – Johann Salomo Semler, German historian and critic (born 1725)
- 1803 – Friedrich Gottlieb Klopstock, German poet (born 1724)
- 1811 – Augustus FitzRoy, 3rd Duke of Grafton, English politician, Prime Minister of Great Britain (born 1735)
- 1823 – Charles François Dumouriez, French general and politician, French Minister of War (born 1739)
- 1860 – Carl Ritter von Ghega, Italian engineer, designed the Semmering railway (born 1802)
- 1877 – Juan Manuel de Rosas, Argentinian general and politician, 17th Governor of Buenos Aires Province (born 1793)
- 1883 – Karl Marx, German philosopher and theorist (born 1818)
- 1884 – Quintino Sella, Italian economist and politician, Italian Minister of Finances (born 1827)

=== 1901–present ===
- 1921 – Bernard Ryan executed Irish republican (born 1901)
- 1923 – Charlie Daly and three other Irish Republicans are executed by Irish Free State forces (born 1896)
- 1930 – A. A. Kannisto, Finnish politician (born 1876)
- 1932 – George Eastman, American inventor and businessman, founded Eastman Kodak (born 1854)
- 1932 – Frederick Jackson Turner, American historian (born 1861)
- 1937 – Lars Edvard Phragmén, Swedish mathematician (born 1863)
- 1941 – C. R. M. F. Cruttwell, English historian (born 1887)
- 1953 – Klement Gottwald, Czechoslovak Communist politician and 4th President of Czechoslovakia (born 1896)
- 1957 – Evagoras Pallikarides, Cypriot activist (born 1938)
- 1965 – Marion Jones Farquhar, American tennis player (born 1879)
- 1968 – Erwin Panofsky, German historian and academic (born 1892)
- 1969 – Ben Shahn, Lithuanian-American painter, illustrator, and educator (born 1898)
- 1973 – Howard H. Aiken, American computer scientist and engineer (born 1900)
- 1973 – Chic Young, American cartoonist (born 1901)
- 1975 – Susan Hayward, American actress (born 1917)
- 1976 – Busby Berkeley, American director and choreographer (born 1895)
- 1977 – Fannie Lou Hamer, American activist and philanthropist (born 1917)
- 1979 – Frank McEncroe, Australian businessman (born 1908)
- 1980 – Mohammad Hatta, Indonesian politician, 3rd Prime Minister of Indonesia (born 1902)
- 1980 – Félix Rodríguez de la Fuente, Spanish environmentalist (born 1928)
- 1984 – Hovhannes Shiraz, Armenian poet (born 1915)
- 1989 – Zita of Bourbon-Parma, Empress of Austria and Queen of Hungary (born 1892)
- 1991 – Howard Ashman, American playwright and composer (born 1950)
- 1994 – Sheila Humphreys, Irish Republican, political activist and Hunger Striker (born 1899)
- 1995 – William Alfred Fowler, American physicist and astronomer, Nobel Prize laureate (born 1911)
- 1997 – Fred Zinnemann, Austrian-American director and producer (born 1907)
- 1999 – Kirk Alyn, American actor (born 1910)
- 1999 – John Broome, American author (born 1913)
- 2003 – Jack Goldstein, Canadian-American painter (born 1945)
- 2003 – Jean-Luc Lagardère, French engineer and businessman (born 1928)
- 2006 – Lennart Meri, Estonian director and politician, 2nd President of Estonia (born 1929)
- 2007 – Lucie Aubrac, French educator and activist (born 1912)
- 2008 – Chiara Lubich, Italian activist, co-founded the Focolare Movement (born 1920)
- 2010 – Peter Graves, American actor (born 1926)
- 2012 – Pierre Schoendoerffer, French director and screenwriter (born 1928)
- 2012 – Ċensu Tabone, Maltese general and politician, 4th President of Malta (born 1913)
- 2013 – Jack Greene, American singer-songwriter and guitarist (born 1930)
- 2013 – Aramais Sahakyan, Armenian poet and author (born 1936)
- 2013 – Ieng Sary, Vietnamese-Cambodian politician, Cambodian Minister for Foreign Affairs (born 1925)
- 2014 – Tony Benn, English politician, Postmaster General of the United Kingdom (born 1925)
- 2014 – Meir Har-Zion, Israeli commander (born 1934)
- 2016 – John W. Cahn, German-American metallurgist and academic (born 1928)
- 2016 – Peter Maxwell Davies, English composer and conductor (born 1934)
- 2016 – Suranimala Rajapaksha, Sri Lankan lawyer and politician (born 1949)
- 2018 – Jim Bowen, English stand-up comedian and TV personality (born 1937)
- 2018 – Marielle Franco, Brazilian politician and human rights activist (born 1979)
- 2018 – Stephen Hawking, English physicist and author (born 1942)
- 2018 – Liam O'Flynn, Irish uileann piper (born 1945)
- 2019 – Jake Phelps, American skateboarder and Thrasher editor-in-chief (born 1962)
- 2019 – Charlie Whiting, British motorsport director (born 1952)
- 2019 – Haig Young, Canadian politician (born 1928)
- 2022 – Scott Hall, American wrestler (born 1958)
- 2025 – Alan Simpson, United States senator from Wyoming (born 1931)

== Holidays and observances ==
- Christian feast day:
  - Leobinus
  - Matilda of Ringelheim
  - March 14 (Eastern Orthodox liturgics)
- Constitution Day (Andorra)
- Heroes' Day (Saint Vincent and the Grenadines)
- Mother Tongue Day (Estonia)
- Nanakshahi New Year, first day of the month of Chet (Sikhism)
- Pi Day
- Steak and Blowjob Day, a satirical unofficial holiday created in the United States as a male response to Valentine's Day
- Summer Day (Albania)
- White Day on which men give gifts to women; complementary to Valentine's Day (Japan and other Asian nations)
