= Ivan Gulko =

Russian footballer

Personal information
- Full name: Ivan Aleksandrovich Gulko
- Date of birth: 23 October 2003 (age 23)
- Place of birth: Orenburg, Russia
- Height: 1.86 m (6 ft 1 in)
- Position: Forward

Team information
- Current team: KAMAZ Naberezhnye Chelny (on loan from Orenburg)
- Number: 65

Youth career
- –2021: Orenburg

Senior career*
Years	Team	Apps	(Gls)
2021–2026	Orenburg	0	(0)
2021–2023	→ Orenburg-2	65	(19)
2024	→ Irtysh Omsk (loan)	3	(0)
2024	→ Kaluga (loan)	18	(2)
2025	→ Tyumen (loan)	12	(3)
2025	→ Slavia Mozyr (loan)	11	(0)
2026–	Orenburg-2	8	(2)
2026–	→ KAMAZ Naberezhnye Chelny (loan)	0	(0)
- * Club domestic league appearances and goals as of 7 June 2026

Ivan Aleksandrovich Gulko (Russian: Иван Александрович Гулько; born 23 October 2003) is a Russian footballer who plays as a forward for KAMAZ Naberezhnye Chelny on loan from Orenburg.

== Career ==
He made his debut in the Russian Second League for Orenburg-2 on 18 July 2021, in a game against Torpedo Miass.

He made his debut in the Russian First League for Tyumen on 2 March 2025, in a game against Rodina Moscow.

He made his debut in the Belarusian Premier League for Slavia Mozyr on 24 August 2025 in a game against Dynamo Minsk.
