= Dmitri Butaliy =

Russian footballer

Personal information
- Full name: Dmitri Ivanovich Butaliy
- Date of birth: 23 June 1976 (age 50)
- Height: 1.82 m (5 ft 11 1/2 in)
- Position: Defender

Senior career*
Years	Team	Apps	(Gls)
1993–1997	FC KAMAZ-Chally Naberezhnye Chelny	1	(0)
1993–1997	→ FC KAMAZ-d Naberezhnye Chelny (loans)	100	(4)
- * Club domestic league appearances and goals

Dmitri Ivanovich Butaliy (Russian: Дмитрий Иванович Буталий; born 23 June 1976) is a Russian former football player.

His father Ivan Butaliy is a football coach.
