= Vitali Panov =

Russian footballer

Personal information
- Full name: Vitali Nikolayevich Panov
- Date of birth: 21 August 1979 (age 47)
- Place of birth: Zheleznogorsk, Kursk Oblast, Russian SFSR
- Height: 1.82 m (5 ft 11 1/2 in)
- Positions: Defender; midfielder

Team information
- Current team: Krylia Sovetov Samara (assistant coach)

Youth career
- Oryol

Senior career*
| Years | Team | Apps | (Gls) |
| 1996–2000 | Mozdok | 64 | (6) |
| 2001 | Avtodor Vladikavkaz | 31 | (5) |
| 2002 | Titan Reutov | 30 | (3) |
| 2003–2005 | KAMAZ Naberezhnye Chelny | 48 | (5) |
| 2006 | Oryol | 19 | (0) |
| 2006 | Nosta Novotroitsk | 10 | (0) |

Managerial career
- 2007–2008: KAMAZ-2 Naberezhnye Chelny
- 2009: KAMAZ Naberezhnye Chelny (assistant)
- 2009: KAMAZ Naberezhnye Chelny (caretaker)
- 2010: Krylia Sovetov Samara (assistant)
- 2011–2012: Shinnik Yaroslavl (assistant)
- 2013–2018: Volgar Astrakhan (assistant)
- 2018–2021: Volgar Astrakhan
- 2022: Akron Tolyatti
- 2023–2024: Chelyabinsk
- 2024–2026: Amkal Moscow
- 2026–: Krylia Sovetov Samara (assistant)
- * Club domestic league appearances and goals

Vitali Nikolayevich Panov (Russian: Виталий Николаевич Панов; born 21 August 1979) is a Russian professional football coach and a former player who is an assistant manager for Krylia Sovetov Samara.

== Career ==
Born in Zheleznogorsk, Kursk Oblast, Panov began playing football in Oryol's youth system. He became a professional footballer with Mozdok under manager Yuri Gazzaev.

Panov was appointed caretaker manager of KAMAZ Naberezhnye Chelny during October 2009, replacing his former manager, Yuri Gazzaev.
