= Valeri Chetverik =

Russian professional football coach

Personal information
- Full name: Valeri Vasilyevich Chetverik
- Date of birth: December 29, 1957 (age 68)
- Place of birth: Tikhoretsk, Russian SFSR

Managerial career
- Years: Team
- 1981–1996: FC KAMAZ-Chally Naberezhnye Chelny
- 1996: FC KAMAZ-Chally Naberezhnye Chelny (technical director)
- 1997–1998: FC KAMAZ-Chally Naberezhnye Chelny (general director)
- 1998: FC Gazovik-Gazprom Izhevsk (director of sports)
- 1998: FC KAMAZ-Chally Naberezhnye Chelny
- 1999: FC KAMAZ-Chally Naberezhnye Chelny
- 2000: FC Krylia Sovetov Samara (VP)
- 2000: FC Belshina Bobruisk
- 2001: PFC CSKA Moscow (scout)
- 2002: PFC CSKA Moscow (director of sports)
- 2003: FC Chernomorets Novorossiysk
- 2004: FC Kuban Krasnodar (consultant)
- 2004: FC Sochi-04 (general director)
- 2010–2012: FC Rus St. Petersburg

Valeri Vasilyevich Chetverik (Russian: Валерий Васильевич Четверик; born December 29, 1957, in Tikhoretsk) is a Russian professional football coach.

His son Grigori Chetverik is a football player.
