= Vitali Yermilov =

Russian footballer

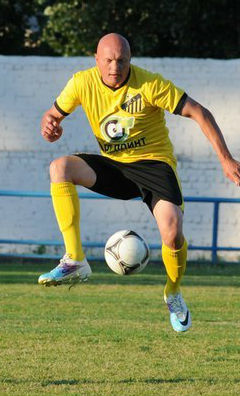

Personal information
- Full name: Vitali Yuryevich Yermilov
- Date of birth: 8 June 1970 (age 56)
- Place of birth: Belaya Kalitva, Rostov Oblast, Russian SFSR
- Height: 1.80 m (5 ft 11 in)
- Position: Forward

Senior career*
Years	Team	Apps	(Gls)
1992	FC Shakhtyor Shakhty	42	(16)
1993–1994	FC Rostselmash Rostov-on-Don	37	(1)
1995–1996	FC Torpedo Taganrog	74	(47)
1997–1999	FC Sokol Saratov	71	(16)
2000	FC Arsenal Tula	10	(2)
2001–2004	FC KAMAZ Naberezhnye Chelny	115	(69)
2005	FC Sokol Saratov	30	(4)
- * Club domestic league appearances and goals

Vitali Yuryevich Yermilov (Russian: Виталий Юрьевич Ермилов; born 8 June 1970) is a former Russian professional football player.

Since 2015 he has been working as a junior trainer in Saratov.

== Honours ==
- Russian Second Division top scorer: 2001 (Zone Ural, 26 goals), 2003 (Zone Ural / Povolzhye, 23 goals).
