= Ruslan Gazzayev =

Russian footballer

Personal information
- Full name: Ruslan Yuryevich Gazzayev
- Date of birth: 14 April 1991 (age 35)
- Place of birth: Vladikavkaz, Russian SFSR
- Height: 1.87 m (6 ft 2 in)
- Position: Midfielder

Team information
- Current team: FC Dynamo Moscow (academy coach)

Youth career
- FC KAMAZ Naberezhnye Chelny
- FC Krylia Sovetov Samara

Senior career*
| Years | Team | Apps | (Gls) |
| 2010–2011 | FC Taganrog | 1 | (0) |
| 2011 | FK Jūrmala-VV | 4 | (0) |
| 2013 | FC Volgar-Astrakhan Astrakhan | 6 | (1) |
| 2013–2018 | FC Volgar Astrakhan | 96 | (1) |
| 2018 | FC Spartak Vladikavkaz | 14 | (1) |
| 2019 | FC Kuban-Holding Pavlovskaya (amateur) | | |

Managerial career
- 2020–: FC Dynamo Moscow (academy)
- * Club domestic league appearances and goals

Ruslan Yuryevich Gazzayev (Russian: Руслан Юрьевич Газзаев; born 14 April 1991) is a Russian professional football coach and a former player who played as a midfielder. He works as a coach at the FC Dynamo Moscow academy.

== Club career ==
He made his Russian Football National League debut for FC Volgar Astrakhan on 10 August 2014 in a game against FC Volga Nizhny Novgorod.

== Personal life ==
He is the son of Yuri Gazzaev.
