= 1989 in Soviet football =

Football in the Soviet Union
- Season: 1989

Men's football
- Top League: Spartak Moscow
- First League: CSKA Moscow
- Second League: Lokomotiv Gorkiy (Finals 1); Tekstilschik Tiraspol (Finals 2); Dinamo Sukhumi (Finals 3)
- Soviet Cup: Dnepr Dnepropetrovsk

The 1989 Soviet football championship was the 56th seasons of competitive football in the Soviet Union. Spartak Moscow won the Top League championship becoming the Soviet domestic champions for the twelfth time.

== Honours ==
Competition		Winner	Runner-up
Top League		Spartak Moscow (12)	Dnepr Dnepropetrovsk
First League		CSKA Moscow (2)	Guria Lanchkhuti
Second League	Finals 1	Lokomotiv Gorkiy	Irtysh Omsk
Second League	Group 2	Tekstilschik Tiraspol	Volyn Lutsk
Second League	Group 3	Dinamo Sukhumi	Neftianik Fergana
Soviet Cup		Dnepr Dnepropetrovsk (1)	Torpedo Moscow

Notes = Number in parentheses is the times that club has won that honour. * indicates new record for competition

== Soviet Union football championship ==
=== Top League ===
Pos	Team	Pld	W	D	L	GF	GA	GD	Pts	Qualification or relegation
1	(Russian Soviet Federative Socialist Republic) Spartak Moscow (C)	30	17	10	3	49	19	+30	44	Qualification for European Cup first round
2	(Ukrainian Soviet Socialist Republic) Dnipro Dnipropetrovsk	30	18	6	6	47	27	+20	42	Qualification for UEFA Cup first round
3	(Ukrainian Soviet Socialist Republic) Dynamo Kyiv	30	13	12	5	44	27	+17	38	Qualification for Cup Winners' Cup first round
4	(Lithuanian Soviet Socialist Republic) Žalgiris Vilnius (X)	30	14	8	8	39	29	+10	36	Surrendered its qualification for UEFA competitions
5	(Russian Soviet Federative Socialist Republic) Torpedo Moscow	30	11	13	6	40	26	+14	35	Qualification for UEFA Cup first round
6	(Ukrainian Soviet Socialist Republic) Chornomorets Odesa	30	11	9	10	40	41	−1	31	Qualification for UEFA Cup first round (Note: Qualified to Europe instead of Žalgiris Vilnius)
7	(Ukrainian Soviet Socialist Republic) Metalist Kharkiv	30	10	10	10	30	33	−3	30	
8	(Russian Soviet Federative Socialist Republic) Dinamo Moscow	30	9	12	9	31	26	+5	30	
9	(Byelorussian Soviet Socialist Republic) Dinamo Minsk	30	11	7	12	35	33	+2	29	
10	(Russian Soviet Federative Socialist Republic) Rotor Volgograd	30	9	9	12	28	35	−7	27	
11	(Georgian Soviet Socialist Republic) Dinamo Tbilisi (X)	30	6	13	11	27	32	−5	25	Withdrew
12	(Armenian Soviet Socialist Republic) Ararat Yerevan	30	8	8	14	25	41	−16	24	
13	(Tajik Soviet Socialist Republic) Pamir Dushanbe	30	7	10	13	20	38	−18	24	
14	(Ukrainian Soviet Socialist Republic) Shakhtar Donetsk	30	9	5	16	24	36	−12	23	
15	(Russian Soviet Federative Socialist Republic) Lokomotiv Moscow (R)	30	7	9	14	20	32	−12	23	Relegation to First League
16	(Russian Soviet Federative Socialist Republic) Zenit Leningrad (R)	30	5	9	16	24	48	−24	19	Relegation to First League

(C) Champions; (R) Relegated; (X) Quit the Football Federation of the Soviet Union after this season and joined the leagues of their native countries. For the following season, the league was reduced to 13 teams as Žalgiris would quit after their first game of the new season.

=== First League ===
Pos	Team	Pld	W	D	L	GF	GA	GD	Pts	Promotion or relegation
1	(Russian Soviet Federative Socialist Republic) CSKA Moscow (C, P)	42	24	11	7	79	44	+35	59	Promotion to Top League
2	(Georgian Soviet Socialist Republic) Guria Lanchkhuti (X)	42	22	10	10	64	45	+19	54	Withdrew from the league
3	(Kazakh Soviet Socialist Republic) Kairat Almaty	42	21	9	12	68	40	+28	51	
4	(Russian Soviet Federative Socialist Republic) Dynamo Stavropol	42	20	10	12	47	39	+8	50	
5	(Russian Soviet Federative Socialist Republic) Fakel Voronezh	42	20	8	14	56	49	+7	48	
6	(Ukrainian Soviet Socialist Republic) Tavriya Simferopol	42	19	10	13	64	56	+8	48	
7	(Ukrainian Soviet Socialist Republic) Metalurh Zaporizhia	42	21	5	16	54	56	−2	47	
8	(Azerbaijan Soviet Socialist Republic) Neftchi Baku	42	17	13	12	46	35	+11	47	
9	(Armenian Soviet Socialist Republic) Kotayk Abovyan	42	19	7	16	60	53	+7	45	
10	(Moldavian Soviet Socialist Republic) Nistru Chisinau	42	16	11	15	50	50	0	43	
11	(Russian Soviet Federative Socialist Republic) Geolog Tyumen	42	15	13	14	56	52	+4	43	
12	(Uzbek Soviet Socialist Republic) Pakhtakor Tashkent	42	17	7	18	57	59	−2	41	
13	(Georgian Soviet Socialist Republic) Torpedo Kutaisi (X)	42	17	7	18	45	50	−5	41	Withdrew from the league
14	(Russian Soviet Federative Socialist Republic) Rostselmash Rostov-on-Don	42	17	6	19	58	52	+6	40	
15	(Russian Soviet Federative Socialist Republic) Kuzbass Kemerevo	42	17	5	20	60	58	+2	39	
16	(Russian Soviet Federative Socialist Republic) Shinnik Yaroslavl	42	14	11	17	50	54	−4	39	
17	(Russian Soviet Federative Socialist Republic) Spartak Ordjonikidze	42	15	7	20	30	48	−18	37	
18	(Georgian Soviet Socialist Republic) Dinamo Batumi (X)	42	11	14	17	44	50	−6	36	Withdrew from the league
19	(Russian Soviet Federative Socialist Republic) Kuban Krasnodar	42	11	13	18	36	49	−13	35	
20	(Russian Soviet Federative Socialist Republic) SKA Rostov-on-Don (R)	42	11	13	18	32	47	−15	35	Relegation to Second League
21	(Latvian Soviet Socialist Republic) Daugava Riga (R)	42	8	10	24	40	68	−28	26	Relegation to Second League
22	(Ukrainian Soviet Socialist Republic) SKA Karpaty Lviv (R)	42	7	6	29	31	73	−42	20	Relegation to Second League

(C) Champions; (P) Promoted; (R) Relegated; (X) Quit the Football Federation of the Soviet Union after this season and joined the leagues of the native country.

=== Group 1 ===
Pos	Rep	Team	Pld	W	D	L	GF	GA	GD	Pts	Promotion
1	RUS	Lokomotiv Gorkiy	4	2	1	1	6	3	+3	5	Promoted
2	RUS	Irtysh Omsk	4	2	0	2	4	3	+1	4	
3	RUS	Cement Novorossiysk	4	1	1	2	4	8	−4	3	

=== Group 2 ===
Pos	Rep	Team	Pld	W	D	L	GF	GA	GD	Pts	Promotion
1	MDA	Textilshchik Tiraspol	4	3	1	0	7	2	+5	7	Promoted
2	UKR	Volyn Lutsk	4	0	3	1	2	5	−3	3	
3	RUS	Krylya Sovetov Kuibyshev	4	0	2	2	4	6	−2	2	

=== Group 3 ===
Pos	Rep	Team	Pld	W	D	L	GF	GA	GD	Pts	Promotion
1	GEO	Dinamo Sukhumi	4	3	0	1	5	1	+4	6	Promoted
2	UZB	Neftyanik Fergana	4	2	0	2	2	5	−3	4	
3	KAZ	Traktor Pavlodar	4	1	0	3	3	4	−1	2	

Source: rsssf.com

=== Top goalscorers ===
Top League

- Sergei Rodionov (Spartak Moscow) – 16 goals

First League

- Valeriy Masalitin (CSKA Moscow) – 32 goals
