= Ruslan Ayukin =

Russian footballer

Personal information
- Full name: Ruslan Faritovich Ayukin
- Date of birth: 9 February 1994 (age 32)
- Place of birth: Naberezhnye Chelny, Russia
- Height: 1.79 m (5 ft 10 in)
- Position: Defender

Team information
- Current team: KAMAZ Naberezhnye Chelny
- Number: 7

Youth career
- KAMAZ Naberezhnye Chelny

Senior career*
| Years | Team | Apps | (Gls) |
| 2012– | KAMAZ Naberezhnye Chelny | 250 | (6) |
- * Club domestic league appearances and goals as of 16 May 2026

Ruslan Faritovich Ayukin (Russian: Руслан Фаритович Аюкин; born 9 February 1994) is a Russian football player who plays for KAMAZ Naberezhnye Chelny.

== Career ==
He made his debut in the Russian Football National League for KAMAZ Naberezhnye Chelny on 17 July 2021 in a game against Tekstilshchik Ivanovo.

== Career statistics ==
As of 16 May 2026

| Club | Season | League | | | Cup | | Other | | Total | |
| Club | Season | Division | Apps | Goals | Apps | Goals | Apps | Goals | Apps | Goals |
|---|---|---|---|---|---|---|---|---|---|---|
| KAMAZ Naberezhnye Chelny | 2012–13 | Russian Second League | 15 | 0 | 0 | 0 | — | | 15 | 0 |
| KAMAZ Naberezhnye Chelny | 2013–14 | Russian Second League | 3 | 0 | 1 | 0 | — | | 4 | 0 |
| KAMAZ Naberezhnye Chelny | 2016–17 | Russian Second League | 23 | 4 | 3 | 1 | — | | 26 | 5 |
| KAMAZ Naberezhnye Chelny | 2017–18 | Russian Second League | 18 | 0 | 1 | 0 | — | | 19 | 0 |
| KAMAZ Naberezhnye Chelny | 2018–19 | Russian Second League | 23 | 0 | 0 | 0 | — | | 23 | 0 |
| KAMAZ Naberezhnye Chelny | 2019–20 | Russian Second League | 16 | 0 | 4 | 0 | 3 (Note: Appearances in FNL Cup) | 0 | 23 | 0 |
| KAMAZ Naberezhnye Chelny | 2020–21 | Russian Second League | 14 | 0 | 2 | 0 | — | | 16 | 0 |
| KAMAZ Naberezhnye Chelny | 2021–22 | Russian First League | 32 | 1 | 4 | 0 | — | | 36 | 1 |
| KAMAZ Naberezhnye Chelny | 2022–23 | Russian First League | 26 | 0 | 2 | 0 | — | | 28 | 0 |
| KAMAZ Naberezhnye Chelny | 2023–24 | Russian First League | 29 | 0 | 1 | 0 | — | | 30 | 0 |
| KAMAZ Naberezhnye Chelny | 2024–25 | Russian First League | 22 | 0 | 1 | 0 | — | | 23 | 0 |
| KAMAZ Naberezhnye Chelny | 2025–26 | Russian First League | 29 | 1 | 2 | 0 | — | | 31 | 1 |
| KAMAZ Naberezhnye Chelny | Total | | 250 | 6 | 21 | 1 | 3 | 0 | 274 | 7 |
| Career total | | | 250 | 6 | 21 | 1 | 3 | 0 | 274 | 7 |
