= Grigori Chetverik =

Russian footballer

Personal information
- Full name: Grigori Valeryevich Chetverik
- Date of birth: 19 July 1987 (age 39)
- Place of birth: Brezhnev, Tatar ASSR, Russian SFSR
- Height: 1.78 m (5 ft 10 in)
- Position: Midfielder

Senior career*
Years	Team	Apps	(Gls)
2004	Rodnik Alekseyevskaya		
2005	Krasnodar-2000	5	(1)
2006	Spartak-Avto Moscow		
2007	TEKS Ivanteyevka		
2009	Krasnodar-2000	1	(0)
2010–2012	Torpedo Vladimir	29	(0)
2012	Gomel	1	(0)
2012–2013	Dinastiya Moscow		
2014	Zhemchuzhina Yalta	2	(0)
- * Club domestic league appearances and goals

Grigori Valeryevich Chetverik (Russian: Григорий Валерьевич Четверик; born 19 July 1987) is a former Russian former professional football player.

== Club career ==
He played in the Russian Football National League for FC Torpedo Vladimir in the 2011–12 season.

== Personal life ==
He is a son of coach Valeri Chetverik.
