= 1988 in Soviet football =

Football in the Soviet Union
- Season: 1988

Men's football
- Top League: Dnepr Dnepropetrovsk
- First League: Pamir Dushanbe
- Second League: Nistru Kishinev (Finals 1); Torpedo Kutaisi (Finals 2); Fakel Voronezh (Finals 3)
- Soviet Cup: Metallist Kharkov

The 1988 Soviet football championship was the 56th seasons of competitive football in the Soviet Union. Dnepr Dnepropetrovsk won the Top League championship becoming the Soviet domestic champions for the second time.

== Honours ==
Competition		Winner	Runner-up
Top League		Dnepr Dnepropetrovsk (2)	Dinamo Kiev
First League		Pamir Dushanbe (1)	Rotor Volgograd
Second League	Finals 1	Nistru Kishinev	Neftianik Fergana
Second League	Group 2	Torpedo Kutaisi	Tsement Novorossiysk
Second League	Group 3	Fakel Voronezh	Bukovina Chernovtsy
Soviet Cup		Metallist Kharkov (1)	Torpedo Moscow

Notes = Number in parentheses is the times that club has won that honour. * indicates new record for competition

== Soviet Union football championship ==
=== Top League ===
Pos	Team	Pld	W	D	L	GF	GA	GD	Pts	Qualification or relegation
1	(Ukrainian Soviet Socialist Republic) Dnipro Dnipropetrovsk (C)	30	18	10	2	49	23	+26	46	Qualification for European Cup first round
2	(Ukrainian Soviet Socialist Republic) Dynamo Kyiv	30	17	9	4	43	19	+24	43	Qualification for UEFA Cup first round
3	(Russian Soviet Federative Socialist Republic) Torpedo Moscow	30	17	8	5	39	23	+16	42	Qualification for Cup Winners' Cup first round
4	(Russian Soviet Federative Socialist Republic) Spartak Moscow	30	14	11	5	40	26	+14	39 (Note: No draw limit for Spartak M and Dinamo Mn)	Qualification for UEFA Cup first round
5	(Lithuanian Soviet Socialist Republic) Žalgiris Vilnius	30	14	7	9	39	35	+4	35	Qualification for UEFA Cup first round
6	(Russian Soviet Federative Socialist Republic) Zenit Leningrad	30	11	9	10	35	34	+1	31	Qualification for UEFA Cup first round
7	(Russian Soviet Federative Socialist Republic) Lokomotiv Moscow	30	10	12	8	35	29	+6	30 (Note: 2 points deducted (10 draw limited))	
8	(Ukrainian Soviet Socialist Republic) Shakhtar Donetsk	30	9	10	11	30	28	+2	28	
9	(Armenian Soviet Socialist Republic) Ararat Erevan	30	9	9	12	21	28	−7	27	
10	(Russian Soviet Federative Socialist Republic) Dinamo Moscow	30	9	8	13	32	38	−6	26	
11	(Ukrainian Soviet Socialist Republic) Metalist Kharkiv	30	8	10	12	29	36	−7	26	
12	(Byelorussian Soviet Socialist Republic) Dinamo Minsk	30	7	11	12	29	34	−5	25	
13	(Ukrainian Soviet Socialist Republic) Chornomorets Odessa	30	9	6	15	24	37	−13	24	
14	(Georgian Soviet Socialist Republic) Dinamo Tbilisi	30	9	5	16	28	37	−9	23	
15	(Azerbaijan Soviet Socialist Republic) Neftchi Baku (R)	30	5	7	18	28	46	−18	17	Relegation to First League
16	(Kazakh Soviet Socialist Republic) Kairat Alma-Ata (R)	30	6	4	20	25	53	−28	16	Relegation to First League

Source: rsssf.com
(C) Champions; (R) Relegated

=== First League ===
Pos	Team	Pld	W	D	L	GF	GA	GD	Pts	Promotion or relegation
1	(Tajik Soviet Socialist Republic) Pamir Dushanbe (C, P)	42	24	10	8	78	44	+34	58	Promotion to Top League
2	(Russian Soviet Federative Socialist Republic) Rotor Volgograd (P)	42	25	7	10	76	37	+39	57	Promotion to Top League
3	(Russian Soviet Federative Socialist Republic) CSKA Moscow	42	23	10	9	69	35	+34	56	
4	(Georgian Soviet Socialist Republic) Guria Lanchkhuti	42	23	7	12	71	44	+27	53	
5	(Uzbek Soviet Socialist Republic) Pakhtakor Tashkent	42	21	10	11	64	38	+26	52	
6	(Russian Soviet Federative Socialist Republic) Dynamo Stavropol	42	18	11	13	59	46	+13	47	
7	(Ukrainian Soviet Socialist Republic) SKA Karpaty Lviv	42	18	8	16	51	39	+12	44	
8	(Latvian Soviet Socialist Republic) Daugava Riga	42	18	7	17	56	54	+2	43	
9	(Russian Soviet Federative Socialist Republic) SKA Rostov-on-Don	42	16	10	16	57	64	−7	42	
10	(Russian Soviet Federative Socialist Republic) Rostselmash Rostov-on-Don	42	16	8	18	59	67	−8	40	
11	(Russian Soviet Federative Socialist Republic) Shinnik Yaroslavl	42	16	8	18	48	48	0	40	
12	(Russian Soviet Federative Socialist Republic) Geolog Tyumen	42	17	5	20	46	58	−12	39	
13	(Russian Soviet Federative Socialist Republic) Spartak Ordjonikidze	42	15	9	18	57	60	−3	39	
14	(Ukrainian Soviet Socialist Republic) Tavriya Simferopol	42	13	14	15	34	43	−9	38 (Note: There was a draw limit for the draws earned, 12. Only twelve draws earn a point, in contrast, over the limit draws earn no points.)	
15	(Russian Soviet Federative Socialist Republic) Kuzbass Kemerevo	42	13	14	15	38	39	−1	38	
16	(Georgian Soviet Socialist Republic) Dinamo Batumi	42	15	6	21	40	53	−13	36	
17	(Ukrainian Soviet Socialist Republic) Metalurh Zaporizhia	42	12	13	17	30	43	−13	36	
18	(Armenian Soviet Socialist Republic) Kotayk Abovyan	42	14	7	21	55	83	−28	35	
19	(Russian Soviet Federative Socialist Republic) Kuban Krasnodar	42	12	11	19	41	56	−15	35	
20	(Ukrainian Soviet Socialist Republic) Zarya Voroshylovhrad (R)	42	11	10	21	44	59	−15	32	Relegation to Second League
21	(Russian Soviet Federative Socialist Republic) Zvezda Perm (R)	42	10	12	20	37	69	−32	32	Relegation to Second League
22	(Ukrainian Soviet Socialist Republic) Kolos Nikopol (R)	42	10	7	25	31	62	−31	27	Relegation to Second League

(C) Champions; (P) Promoted; (R) Relegated

=== Group 1 ===
Pos	Rep	Team	Pld	W	D	L	GF	GA	GD	Pts	Promotion
1	MDA	Nistru Kishinev	4	3	1	0	7	3	+4	7	Promoted
2	UZB	Neftyanik Fergana	4	2	1	1	3	2	+1	5	
3	RUS	Irtysh Omsk	4	0	0	4	2	7	−5	0	

=== Group 2 ===
Pos	Rep	Team	Pld	W	D	L	GF	GA	GD	Pts	Promotion
1	GEO	Torpedo Kutaisi	4	1	3	0	6	3	+3	5	Promoted
2	RUS	Cement Novorossiysk	4	1	2	1	4	6	−2	4	
3	KAZ	Traktor Pavlodar	4	1	1	2	5	6	−1	3	

=== Group 3 ===
Pos	Rep	Team	Pld	W	D	L	GF	GA	GD	Pts	Promotion
1	RUS	Fakel Voronezh	4	3	0	1	9	2	+7	6	Promoted
2	UKR	Bukovina Chernovtsy	4	3	0	1	6	4	+2	6	
3	RUS	UralMash Sverdlovsk	4	0	0	4	1	10	−9	0	

Source: rsssf.com

=== Top goalscorers ===
Top League

- Yevhen Shakhov (Dnepr Dnepropetrovsk), Aleksandr Borodyuk (Dinamo Moscow) – 16 goals

First League

- Aleksandr Nikitin (Rotor Volgograd), Mukhsin Mukhamadiev (Pamir Dushanbe) – 22 goals
