= Ivan Butaliy =

Russian footballer and manager

Personal information
- Full name: Ivan Nikolayevich Butaliy
- Date of birth: 8 July 1952 (age 74)
- Place of birth: Krasnodar Krai, Russian SFSR
- Position: Midfielder

Senior career*
Years	Team	Apps	(Gls)
1976	FC Urozhay Novotitarovskaya		
1978	FC Urozhay Novotitarovskaya		
1979–1981	FC Kolos Timashevsk		
1982–1986	FC Turbina Brezhnev	121	(32)
1991	FC KAMAZ Naberezhnye Chelny	11	(1)

Managerial career
- 1986–1987: FC Turbina Brezhnev (assistant)
- 1988–1991: FC KAMAZ Naberezhnye Chelny (assistant)
- 1996: FC KAMAZ Naberezhnye Chelny (caretaker)
- 1997: FC KAMAZ Naberezhnye Chelny (assistant)
- 1998: FC KAMAZ Naberezhnye Chelny
- 1998: FC KAMAZ Naberezhnye Chelny
- 1999–2001: FC Neftekhimik Nizhnekamsk
- 2001–2002: FC KAMAZ Naberezhnye Chelny
- 2002: FC KAMAZ Naberezhnye Chelny
- 2003: FC Chernomorets Novorossiysk (assistant)
- 2004–2005: FC Kolos Timashevsk
- 2005–2007: FC Dynamo Krasnodar
- 2011: FC Parus Anapa
- 2013: FC Avtodor Timashevsk
- 2014–: FC Progress Timashevsk
- * Club domestic league appearances and goals

Ivan Nikolayevich Butaliy (Russian: Иван Николаевич Буталий; born 8 July 1952) is a Russian professional football coach and a former player. He manages FC Progress Timashevsk.

His son Dmitri Butaliy played football professionally.
