= FC KAMAZ Naberezhnye Chelny =

Russian football club

KAMAZ
- Full name: Football Club; KAMAZ Naberezhnye Chelny
- Nicknames: Gruzoviki (The Trucks); Avtozovodci (The Car Workers)
- Founded: 1981; 45 years ago
- Ground: KAMAZ stadium
- Capacity: 6,248
- Chairman: Ivan Klipov
- Manager: Anton Khazov
- League: Russian First League
- 2025–26: 5th of 18
- Website: www.fckamaz.ru
Home colours	Away colours

KAMAZ (Russian: Футбольный клуб КАМАЗ Набережные Челны) is a Russian football club based in Naberezhnye Chelny, Russia. The club plays in the second-tier Russian First League.

Colours are (Home) all white. (Away) Light blue shirts, white shorts.

== History ==
The club was founded on 11 November 1981 at the KAMAZ plant under the name Trud-PRZ. The team played in local tournaments until 1988, when they entered Soviet Second League.

KAMAZ stayed in this league until 1992, when following the collapse of the Soviet Union they were entitled to play in the Russian First League. They won the Centre Zone tournament and were promoted into the Top League.

The best result achieved by KAMAZ in the Top League was a 6th position in 1994. It allowed the club to participate in the Intertoto Cup, where KAMAZ reached the semifinals, defeating München 1860 in the group stage.

KAMAZ stayed in the top flight from 1993 to 1997, when the financial troubles of their owner, KAMAZ plant, forced them into the First Division and into the Second Division a year later. The team played in the Ural Zone of the Second Division from 1999 to 2003, where they earned promotion.

KAMAZ became one of the leaders of the First Division in the 2000s, finishing 4th in 2004, 2006, 2007, and 2010 and 3rd in 2005 and 2008. They were relegated back to the third-tier at the end of the 2015–16 season.

On 15 June 2021, the club secured first place in their PFL group and promotion back to FNL.

The club has been known as Trud-PRZ (1981–1987), Torpedo (1988–1989), and KAMAZ-Chally (1995–2000).

The club has won 4 Second Division titles and 1 First Division title.

KAMAZ finished the 2021–22 Russian Football National League in a relegation spot, but was not relegated due to other clubs failing to obtain the 2022–23 season license.

== KAMAZ in Europe ==
1996 UEFA Intertoto Cup

=== Group 8 ===
Team	Pts	Pld	W	D	L	GF	GA	GD
1. (Russia) FC KAMAZ Naberezhnye Chelny	10	4	3	1	0	8	3	+5
2. (Germany) TSV 1860 München	6	4	2	0	2	8	3	+5
3. (Czech Republic) Kaucuk Opava	6	4	2	0	2	5	4	+1
4. (Bulgaria) PFC Spartak Varna	5	4	1	2	1	5	5	0
5. (Poland) ŁKS Łódź	1	4	0	1	3	1	12	−11

22 June 1996
FC KAMAZ	3–0	ŁKS Łódź
29 June 1996
Kaucuk Opava	1–2	FC KAMAZ
13 July 1996
FC KAMAZ	2–2	PFC Spartak Varna
20 July 1996
TSV 1860 München	0–1	FC KAMAZ

Semi-finals (27–28 & 31 July)

FC KAMAZ (Russia) 2–0, 0–4 En Avant Guingamp (France)

== League history ==
=== Soviet Union ===
Season	Div.	Pos.	Pl.	W.	D.	L.	GS	GA	Pts.	Cup	Europe	Top scorer (league)	Head Coach
1988	3rd, Group 2	14	32	8	12	12	32	36	28	—	—	(Soviet Union) Gibadullin – 7 (Soviet Union) Dm. Smirnov – 7	(Soviet Union) Chetverik
1989	3rd, Group 2	7	42	20	8	14	59	50	48	—	—	(Soviet Union) Zakiyev – 11	(Soviet Union) Chetverik
1990	4th, Group 7	1	32	21	5	6	67	26	47	—	—	(Soviet Union) Baryshev – 17	(Soviet Union) Chetverik
1991	3rd, "Centre"	10	42	19	3	20	60	55	41	R128	—	(Soviet Union) Y. Kuznetsov – 28	(Soviet Union) Chetverik

=== Russia ===
Season	Div.	Pos.	Pl.	W.	D.	L.	GS	GA	Pts.	Cup		Europe		Top scorer (league)	Head Coach
1992	2nd, "Centre"	1	34	26	3	5	78	19	55	R32		—		(Russia) Panchenko – 26	(Russia) Chetverik
1993	PL (1st)	10	34	12	6	16	45	53	30	QF		—		(Russia) Panchenko – 21	(Russia) Chetverik
1994	PL (1st)	6	30	11	9	10	38	38	31	QF	R16	—		(Moldova) Tropanets – 7 (Russia) Panchenko – 7	(Russia) Chetverik
1995	PL (1st)	9	30	10	8	12	34	30	38	QF		—		(Russia) Durnev – 9	(Russia) Chetverik
1996	PL (1st)	14	34	10	6	18	43	57	36	QF	R32	UIC	SF	(Russia) Babenko – 9	(Russia) Chetverik (Russia) Butaliy
1997	PL (1st)	18	34	8	3	23	38	75	21^{(−6)}	R16		—		(Belarus) Shukanov – 7	(Lithuania) Zelkevičius
1998	2nd	22	42	7	5	30	32	82	26	R16	R256	—		(Russia) Vekovishchev – 9	(Russia) Butaliy
1999	3rd, "Ural"	10	30	11	7	12	41	46	40	R1024		—		(Russia) Tsarayev – 11	(Russia) Chetverik
2000	3rd, "Ural"	3	30	20	4	6	80	23	64	R512		—		(Russia) Strizhov – 20	(Russia) Shubin
2001	3rd, "Ural"	3	30	21	1	8	81	26	64	R64		—		(Russia) Yermilov – 26	(Russia) Shubin (Russia) Butaliy
2002	3rd, "Ural"	6	28	15	6	7	41	24	51	R128		—		(Russia) Yermilov – 15	(Russia) Butaliy (Russia) Gazzaev
2003	3rd, "Ural-P."	1	38	30	4	4	85	20	94	R32		—		(Russia) Yermilov – 23	(Russia) Gazzaev
2004	2nd	4	42	19	12	11	52	49	69	R32		—		(Russia) Kalimullin – 9	(Russia) Gazzaev
2005	2nd	3	42	26	6	10	80	32	84	R64		—		(Ukraine) Monaryov – 18	(Russia) Gazzaev
2006	2nd	4	42	22	11	9	54	26	77	R64		—		(Russia) Belozyorov – 8	(Russia) Gazzaev
2007	2nd	4	42	23	8	11	67	34	77	R16		—		(Bosnia and Herzegovina) Zeba – 12	(Russia) Gazzaev
2008	2nd	3	42	23	10	9	68	41	79	R32		—		(Russia) Gogniyev – 17	(Russia) Gazzaev
2009	2nd	5	38	18	10	10	50	31	64	R64		—		(Russia) Gogniyev – 17	(Russia) Gazzaev (Russia) Panov
2010	2nd	4	38	19	9	10	55	43	66	R32		—		(Russia) Gogniyev – 13 (Russia) Serdyukov – 13	(Russia) Yevdokimov
2011–12	2nd	9	48	19	10	19	53	46	67	R64		—		(Russia) Koronov – 12	(Russia) Yevdokimov (Russia) Klontsak
2012–13	3rd, "Ural-P."	10	28	8	6	14	23	29	30	R256		—		(Russia) Lukyanov – 4	(Russia) Klontsak
2013–14	3rd, "Ural-P."	3	27	15	4	8	43	36	39	R512		—		(Russia) Akbashev – 6	(Russia) Klontsak
2014–15	3rd, "Ural-P."	1	25	16	7	2	39	10	55	R128		—		(Russia) Safronov – 8	(Russia) Klontsak
2015–16	FNL (2nd)	20	38	6	6	26	20	60	24	R64		—		(Russia) Davydov – 4	(Russia) Klontsak
2016–17	PFL (3rd), "Ural-P."/4	7	24	8	5	11	23	25	29	R128		—		(Russia) Ayukin – 4	(Russia) Klontsak (Russia) Shinkarenko (Russia) Klontsak
2017–18	PFL (3rd), "Ural-P."/4	4	24	13	6	5	37	19	45	R256		—		(Russia) Khubayev – 6	(Russia) Klontsak (Russia) Yefremov
2018–19	PFL (3rd), "Ural-P."/4	2	25	13	6	6	44	25	45	R256		—		(Russia) Karayev – 7 (Russia) Galiakberov – 7	(Russia) Yefremov
2019–20	PFL (3rd), "Ural-P."/4	4	17	10	2	5	37	23	32	R32		—		(Russia) Karayev – 11	(Russia) Belov
2020–21	PFL (3rd), "Ural-P."/4	1	28	21	1	6	75	25	64	R128		—		(Russia) Galiakberov – 15	(Russia) Belov (Russia) Akhmetzyanov
2021–22	First League (2nd)	17	38	8	13	17	29	45	37	R16		—		(Russia) Gagloyev – 7	(Russia) Akhmetzyanov (Note: De facto; de jure — Vladimir Klontsak)
2022–23	First League (2nd)	11	34	11	11	12	35	36	44	6th		—		(Russia) Gagloyev – 5 (Russia) Shamkin – 5	(Russia) Akhmetzyanov
2023–24	First League (2nd)	12	34	10	11	13	30	36	41	5th		—		(Russia) 4 players – 3	(Russia) Akhmetzyanov
2024–25	First League (2nd)	11	34	10	8	16	31	35	38	4th		—		(Russia) Karayev – 6	(Russia) Akhmetzyanov

== Current squad ==
As of 24 September 2026, according to the First League website.

Note: Flags indicate national team as defined under FIFA eligibility rules; some limited exceptions apply. Players may hold more than one non-FIFA nationality.

No.	Pos.	Nation	Player
2	MF	RUS	David Khubayev (on loan from Spartak Kostroma)
5	DF	RUS	Savely Ratnikov
6	DF	RUS	Timofey Kalistratov
7	DF	RUS	Ruslan Ayukin
8	MF	RUS	Yefim Dolgopolov
9	MF	RUS	Ilya Moseychuk
10	MF	RUS	Roman Zashchepkin
11	MF	RUS	Aleksandr Kokotun
13	GK	RUS	Nazar Rybalchenko
15	DF	BLR	Maksim Burko
18	DF	RUS	Artyom Popov
19	MF	RUS	Maksim Bogdanets
22	MF	RUS	Andrey Solodukhin
23	DF	RUS	Artyom Osypa
25	FW	RUS	Merabi Uridia

No.	Pos.	Nation	Player
27	DF	RUS	Roman Manuylov
28	MF	RUS	Mukhammad Sultonov
30	GK	RUS	Yevgeny Zamerets
31	GK	RUS	Artur Anisimov
33	FW	RUS	Nikita Karev
37	MF	RUS	Yevgeni Voronin
54	MF	RUS	Aleksandr Ustyugov
65	FW	RUS	Ivan Gulko (on loan from Orenburg)
67	DF	RUS	Roman Tkachuk
75	GK	RUS	Roman Grashchenkov
76	DF	RUS	Artyom Sukhanov
79	MF	RUS	Vitaly Semyonov
83	MF	RUS	Maksim Laykin
96	MF	RUS	Matvey Shavel
99	MF	RUS	Roman Akbashev

=== Out on loan ===
Note: Flags indicate national team as defined under FIFA eligibility rules; some limited exceptions apply. Players may hold more than one non-FIFA nationality.

No. / Pos. / Nation / Player; — / DF / RUS / Yevgeny Tonevitsky (at Tyumen until 30 June 2027)	No. / Pos. / Nation / Player; — / MF / RUS / Anton Roshchin (at Tyumen until 30 June 2027)

== Reserve squad ==
KAMAZ's reserve squad played professionally as FC KAMAZ-d Naberezhnye Chelny (Russian Second League in 1993, Russian Third League in 1994) and as FC KAMAZ-Chally-d Naberezhnye Chelny (Russian Third League in 1995–1997).

== Notable players ==
Had international caps for their respective countries. Players whose name is listed in bold represented their countries while playing for KAMAZ.

Soviet Union

- (Soviet Union) Ivan Yaremchuk
- (Soviet Union) (Commonwealth of Independent States) (Ukraine) (Russia) Akhrik Tsveiba
- (Russia) Mingiyan Beveyev
- (Russia) Anton Bober
- (Russia) Soslan Dzhanayev
- (Russia) Vladislav Ignatyev
- (Russia) Tamerlan Musayev
- (Russia) Ruslan Nigmatullin
- (Russia) Andrei Novosadov
- (Russia) Valentin Paltsev
- (Russia) Yevgeni Varlamov

Armenia

- (Armenia) Barsegh Kirakosyan

Azerbaijan

- (Azerbaijan) Ruslan İdiqov

Belarus

- (Belarus) Alyaksandar Lukhvich
- (Belarus) Yuri Shukanov

Bosnia and Herzegovina

- (Bosnia and Herzegovina) **Zajko Zeba**

Georgia

- (Georgia (country)) Iuri Gabiskiria
- (Georgia (country)) **Revaz Gotsiridze**
- (Georgia (country)) Mikheil Jishkariani

Kazakhstan

- (Kazakhstan) Oleg Kapustnikov
- (Kazakhstan) Maksim Shevchenko
- (Kazakhstan) Sergei Zhunenko

Lithuania

- (Lithuania) Valdemaras Martinkenas
- (Lithuania) **Aidas Preikšaitis**
- (Lithuania) **Tomas Ražanauskas**
- (Lithuania) **Giedrius Žutautas**

Malawi

- (Malawi) **Essau Kanyenda**

Moldova

- (Moldova) Nicolae Josan
- (Moldova) Alexandru Onica

Jordan

- (Jordan) **Badran Al-Shagran**
- (Jordan) **Adnan Awad**
