= Yuri Kuznetsov (footballer, born 1958) =

Russian footballer and official

Personal information
- Full name: Yuri Vladimirovich Kuznetsov
- Date of birth: 2 August 1958 (age 68)
- Place of birth: Novotroitsk, Orenburg Oblast, Russian SFSR
- Height: 1.78 m (5 ft 10 in)
- Positions: Forward; midfielder

Team information
- Current team: FC KAMAZ Naberezhnye Chelny (administrator)

Senior career*
Years	Team	Apps	(Gls)
1977–1984	FC Turbina Naberezhnye Chelny	192	(41)
1986–1987	FC Turbina Brezhnev	39	(4)
1988	FC Rubin Kazan	5	(0)
1988–1993	FC KAMAZ Naberezhnye Chelny	139	(60)
1993	FC Neftekhimik Nizhnekamsk	17	(8)
1994	FC Metallurg Novotroitsk	0	(0)
1995	FC Rubin Kazan	15	(5)
1995–1996	FC KAMAZ-Chally-d Naberezhnye Chelny	17	(5)
1998	FC Neftyanik Bavly		
1999	FC KAMAZ-Chally Naberezhnye Chelny	1	(0)

Managerial career
- 1997: FC KAMAZ-Chally Naberezhnye Chelny (administrator)
- 2008–: FC KAMAZ Naberezhnye Chelny (administrator)
- * Club domestic league appearances and goals

Yuri Vladimirovich Kuznetsov (Russian: Юрий Владимирович Кузнецов; born 2 August 1958) is a Russian professional football official and a former player. He works as an administrator with FC KAMAZ Naberezhnye Chelny.
