= Yevgeny Tonevitsky =

Russian footballer

Personal information
- Full name: Yevgeny Aleksandrovich Tonevitsky
- Date of birth: 3 February 2004 (age 22)
- Place of birth: Kalach, Kalacheyevsky District, Voronezh Oblast, Russia
- Height: 1.89 m (6 ft 2 in)
- Position: Defender

Team information
- Current team: Tyumen (on loan from KAMAZ Naberezhnye Chelny)
- Number: 5

Youth career
- –2019: Bakulin SSh Kalach
- 2019–2023: Zenit Saint Petersburg

Senior career*
| Years | Team | Apps | (Gls) |
| 2024 | Dynamo Vologda | 3 | (0) |
| 2024–2025 | Rostov | 0 | (0) |
| 2024–2025 | → Rostov-2 | 30 | (1) |
| 2025–2026 | Chernomorets Novorossiysk | 11 | (1) |
| 2026– | KAMAZ Naberezhnye Chelny | 2 | (0) |
| 2026– | → Tyumen (loan) | 3 | (0) |
- * Club domestic league appearances and goals as of 17 October 2026

Yevgeny Aleksandrovich Tonevitsky (Russian: Евгений Александрович Тоневицкий; born 3 February 2004) is a Russian football player who plays as a defender for Tyumen on loan from KAMAZ Naberezhnye Chelny.

== Career ==
He made his Russian Second League debut for Dynamo Vologda on 18 May 2024 in a game against Dynamo-2 Moscow.

He made his debut in the Russian First League for Chernomorets Novorossiysk on 30 August 2025 in a game against Shinnik Yaroslavl.
