= Ildar Akhmetzyanov =

Russian footballer and coach (born 1983)

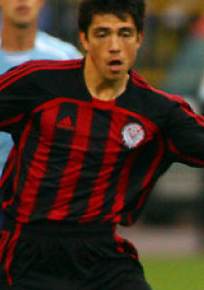
- Ildar Akhmetzyanov (2006)

Personal information
- Full name: Ildar Raushanovich Akhmetzyanov
- Date of birth: 25 November 1983 (age 42)
- Place of birth: Nizhnekamsk, Tatar ASSR, Russian SFSR, USSR
- Height: 1.88 m (6 ft 2 in)
- Positions: Defender; midfielder

Team information
- Current team: Orenburg (manager)

Senior career*
| Years | Team | Apps | (Gls) |
| 2001–2005 | Neftekhimik Nizhnekamsk | 82 | (15) |
| 2002 | → Spartak Shchyolkovo (loan) | 35 | (3) |
| 2005–2008 | Amkar Perm | 24 | (2) |
| 2008–2009 | Sibir Novosibirsk | 5 | (0) |
| 2010 | Kuban Krasnodar | 7 | (0) |
| 2010–2014 | KAMAZ Naberezhnye Chelny | 61 | (1) |

International career
| 2004–2005 | Russia U-21 | 14 | (0) |

Managerial career
- 2014–2018: KAMAZ Naberezhnye Chelny (assistant)
- 2018: KAMAZ Naberezhnye Chelny (administrator)
- 2018–2020: KAMAZ Naberezhnye Chelny (assistant)
- 2020–2021: KAMAZ Naberezhnye Chelny
- 2021–2024: KAMAZ Naberezhnye Chelny (assistant)
- 2024–2025: KAMAZ Naberezhnye Chelny
- 2025–: Orenburg
- * Club domestic league appearances and goals

Ildar Raushanovich Akhmetzyanov (Russian: Ильдар Раушанович Ахметзянов; Tatar: Илдар Раушан улы Әхмәтҗанов; born 25 November 1983) is a Russian professional football coach and a former player who is the manager of Orenburg. He is of Volga Tatar ethnicity.

== Coaching career ==
On 10 October 2025, Akhmetzyanov was hired by Russian Premier League club Orenburg.
