= Vadims Fjodorovs =

Latvian former football goalkeeper

Personal information
- Full name: Vadims Fjodorovs
- Date of birth: 14 March 1977 (age 49)
- Place of birth: Daugavpils, Latvian SSR, Soviet Union (now Republic of Latvia)
- Height: 1.85 m (6 ft 1 in)
- Position: Goalkeeper

Team information
- Current team: Daugava Daugavpils (goalkeeping coach)

Senior career*
| Years | Team | Apps | (Gls) |
| 1997 | Lokomotiv Daugavpils | 8 | (0) |
| 1998 | FK Rēzekne | 20 | (0) |
| 1999–2001 | Dinaburg Daugavpils | 46 | (0) |
| 2002 | FC Tyumen | 6 | (0) |
| 2002–2009 | Dinaburg Daugavpils | 101 | (0) |
| 2010–2011 | Daugava Daugavpils | 0 | (0) |

Managerial career
- 2012–: Daugava Daugavpils (goalkeeping coach)
- * Club domestic league appearances and goals

Vadims Fjodorovs (born 14 March 1977 in Daugavpils) is a Latvian former football goalkeeper, currently a goalkeeping coach for Daugava Daugavpils in the Latvian Higher League.

He played for FC Dinaburg, but after the club's elimination from Virsliga in 2009, he became an unrestricted free agent and joined FC Daugava. In 2001, while playing for FC Dinaburg, Fjodorovs was voted Latvia's Goalkeeper of the Year.

He has also played for FC Tyumen in the Russian Second Division, FK Rēzekne and Lokomotiv Daugavpils.

== Playing career ==
| 1997 | Lokomotiv Daugavpils | Virsliga 1st level | 8/0* |
| 1998 | FK Rēzekne | Virsliga 1st level | 20/0 |
| 1999 | Dinaburg FC Daugavpils | Virsliga 1st level | 1/0 |
| 2000 | Dinaburg FC Daugavpils | Virsliga 1st level | 20/0 |
| 2001 | Dinaburg FC Daugavpils | Virsliga 1st level | 25/0 |
| 2002 | FC Tyumen | Second League 3rd level | 6/0 |
| | Dinaburg FC Daugavpils | Virsliga 1st level | 16/0 |
| 2003 | Dinaburg FC Daugavpils | Virsliga 1st level | 5/0 |
| 2004 | Dinaburg FC Daugavpils | Virsliga 1st level | 28/0 |
| 2005 | Dinaburg FC Daugavpils | LMT Virslīga 1st level | 22/0 |
| 2006 | Dinaburg FC Daugavpils | LMT Virslīga 1st level | 21/0 |
| 2007 | Dinaburg FC Daugavpils | LMT Virslīga 1st level | ?/? |
| | FK Daugava Daugavpils | LMT Virslīga 1st level | ?/? |
