= Yuri Gazzaev =

Russian footballer

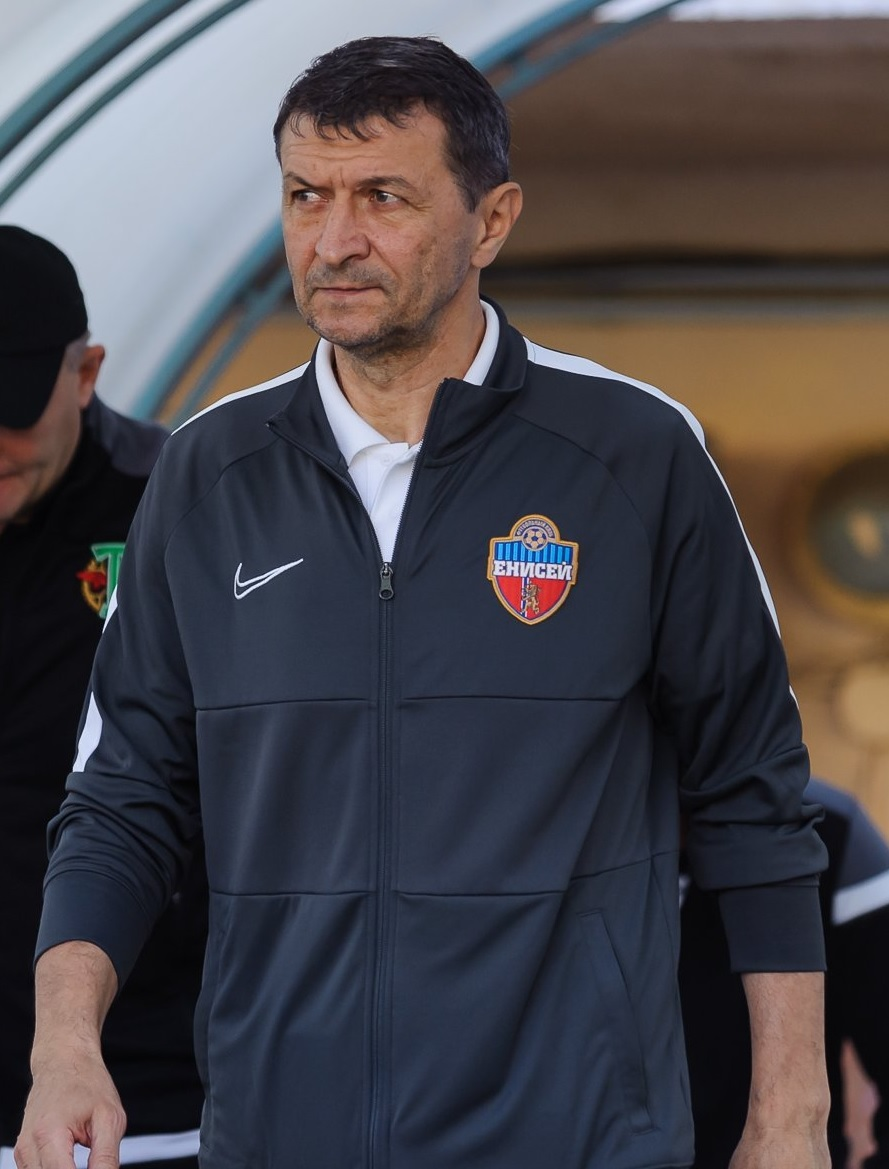
- Gazzaev coaching Yenisey Krasnoyarsk in 2019

Personal information
- Full name: Yuri Nurmagomedov Gazzaev
- Date of birth: 27 November 1960 (age 65)
- Place of birth: Ordjonikidze, Soviet Union
- Height: 1.83 m (6 ft 0 in)
- Positions: Midfielder; forward

Senior career*
Years	Team	Apps	(Gls)
1977–1978	Spartak Ordzhonikidze	2	(0)
1979–1981	Dynamo Moscow	14	(3)
1981–1983	Spartak Ordzhonikidze	63	(33)
1984	Dynamo Moscow	0	(0)
1984–1985	Spartak Ordzhonikidze	42	(9)
1985–1986	Lokomotiv Moscow	4	(0)
1986–1990	Spartak Vladikavkaz	123	(29)
1991	Mačva Šabac		
1991	Spartak Nalchik	8	(1)
1992	Aris Thessaloniki	0	(0)
1993	BK-IFK Vaasa		(4)
1994	Avtodor Vladikavkaz	6	(1)
1994–1995	Niort	7	(0)
1997	Mozdok	7	(1)
1998–1999	Avtodor Vladikavkaz	23	(5)

Managerial career
- 1997: Mozdok
- 1998: Avtodor Vladikavkaz
- 1999–2001: Avtodor Vladikavkaz
- 2001–2002: Titan Reutov
- 2002–2009: KAMAZ
- 2009–2010: Krylia Sovetov Samara
- 2011–2012: Shinnik Yaroslavl
- 2012–2018: Volgar Astrakhan
- 2018: Spartak Vladikavkaz
- 2019–2020: Yenisey Krasnoyarsk
- 2020–2021: Shinnik Yaroslavl
- * Club domestic league appearances and goals

Yuri Farzunovich Gazzaev (Russian: Юрий Фарзунович Газзаев, Iron Ossetic: Гæззаты Фарзуны фырт Юри; born 27 November 1960) is a Russian professional football coach and a former player.

== Playing career ==
As a player, he made his debut in the Soviet First League in 1978 for Spartak Ordzhonikidze.

He signed for French club Niort on a fake paperwork, pretending he was 9 years younger than he actually was (his birth year was changed from 1960 to 1969). He was released a few months later after the fraud was discovered.

== Personal life ==
His son Ruslan Gazzayev was a professional footballer.
