= FC Tyumen =

Russian football club

Tyumen
- Full name: Football Club Tyumen
- Founded: 1961; 65 years ago
- Ground: Geolog Stadium, Tyumen
- Capacity: 13,057
- Owner: Tyumen Oblast
- Chairman: Aleksandr Popov
- Manager: Viktor Trenyov
- League: Russian Second League; Division A Gold Group
- 2026–27: First Stage: Silver Group, 3rd
- Website: fc-tyumen.ru
Home colours	Away colours

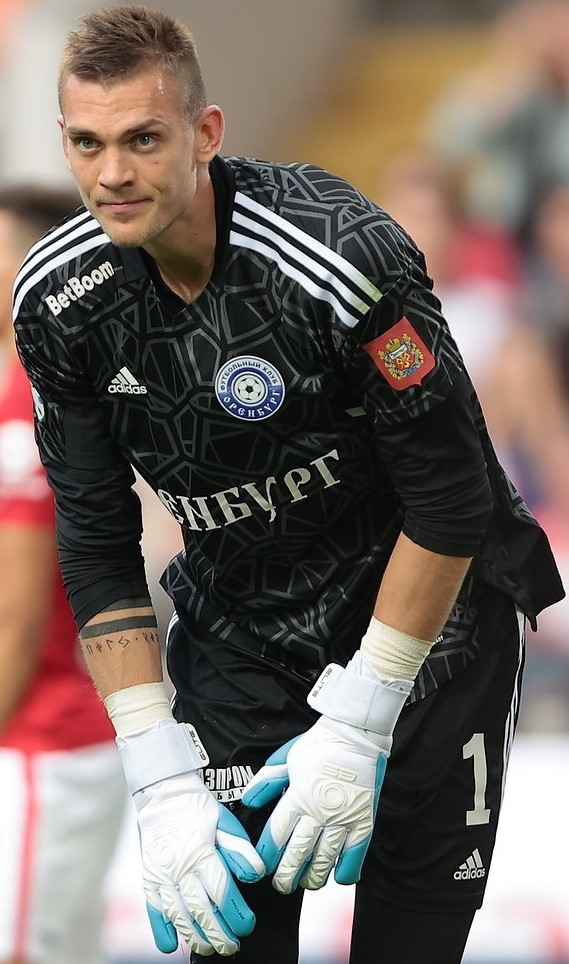
Yevgeni Goshev joined FC Tyumen in 2024

FC Tyumen (Russian: Футбольный клуб «Тюмень») is a Russian football club based in Tyumen. The former member of the Russian Premier League will play in the third-tier Russian Second League Division A in the 2025–26 season.

The club was previously known as Geolog (in 1961–1963 and 1983–1991, meaning Geologist), Priboy (in 1964–1965, meaning Surf), Neftyanik (in 1966–1977, meaning Oiler), Stroitel (meaning Builder), Fakel (in 1980–1982, meaning Torch), Dinamo-Gazovik (in 1992–1996), SDYSOR-Sibnefteprovod (in 2003).

== History ==
The club was founded in 1961 and played in the Soviet Class B (1961–1970), Second League (1971–1986), and First League (1987–1991). In 1992 Tyumen entered the newly formed Russian Premier League and finished last between 20 teams. In 1993 Tyumen won the eastern zone of the First Division and returned to the Premier League for another two seasons, achieving their best result in history in 1994 (12th position). After relegation in 1995 Tyumen once again won the First Division in 1996. In 1998 and 1999 Tyumen suffered two consecutive relegations, ending up in the Second Division. In 2000–2002, Tyumen played in the Second Division, finishing no lower than fourth. In 2003 the club refused to participate in the Second Division, instead fielding a youth team in the Amateur League. In 2004 the club fielded a senior team as well, winning the zonal tournament of the Amateur League, but declined promotion. After finishing first again in 2005, Tyumen returned to professional football and began to play in the Second Division. It won its zone of the Russian Professional Football League in 2013–14 season and was promoted to the second-level Russian National Football League. Despite finishing in the relegation zone at the end of the 2017–18 season, the club was not relegated as other clubs ahead in the standings failed to obtain the league license for 2018–19. On 20 March 2019, 6 points in the standings were taken from Tyumen for unpaid debts to former players Marat Shaymordanov, Sergei Shumeyko and Nikita Fursin. As a result, the club dropped from 18th place to 19th (both in relegation zone). The club was relegated to PFL at the end of the 2018–19 season. It was promoted back to Russian First League after the 2022–23 season. It was relegated from the First League at the end of the 2024–25 season.

== Current squad ==
As of 11 September 2026, according to the official Second League website.

Note: Flags indicate national team as defined under FIFA eligibility rules; some limited exceptions apply. Players may hold more than one non-FIFA nationality.

No.	Pos.	Nation	Player
2	DF	RUS	Aleksey Polev
3	MF	RUS	Maksim Polyakov
4	DF	RUS	Gleb Zakharov
5	DF	RUS	Yevgeny Tonevitsky (on loan from KAMAZ)
7	MF	RUS	Anton Roshchin (on loan from KAMAZ)
8	MF	RUS	Yelizar Glukhov (on loan from Chelyabinsk)
10	FW	RUS	Yevgeni Tatarinov
11	MF	RUS	Vladlen Babayev
13	MF	RUS	Mikhail Petrov
14	DF	RUS	Sergey Luzin
17	MF	RUS	Vitali Shitov
18	MF	RUS	Timofey Dryagin
20	DF	RUS	Vyacheslav Neupokoyev
21	FW	RUS	Maksim Dmitriyev
22	DF	RUS	Vladislav Kruze

No.	Pos.	Nation	Player
24	MF	RUS	Vadim Grinvald
25	DF	RUS	Marat Kulayev
27	DF	RUS	Maksim Ofitserov
29	MF	RUS	Ivan Zazvonkin
35	GK	RUS	Valery Kokarev
45	FW	RUS	Kirill Boyarskikh
54	GK	RUS	Daniil Lukin (on loan from Spartak Moscow)
56	MF	RUS	Viktor Demyanov
69	DF	RUS	Andrey Dernov
70	MF	RUS	Andrey Maryanov
72	GK	RUS	Yakhya Magomedov (on loan from Akhmat Grozny)
90	DF	RUS	Pavel Shakuro
95	MF	RUS	Ivan Oborocha (on loan from Yenisey Krasnoyarsk)
96	DF	RUS	Tomas Rukas
97	MF	RUS	Damir Talikin

== Reserve squad ==
Tyumen's reserve squad played professionally as FC Dynamo-Gazovik-d Tyumen in the Russian Third League in 1995–1996.

== Tyumen Ultras ==
Tyumen fanaticism consists of 3 waves. The first wave came in the 1980s, the second wave in the early 1990s and the third wave the ultras began in 1998 and to this day.

== Notable past players ==
Had international caps for their respective countries. Players whose name is listed in bold represented their countries while playing for Tyumen.

Russia/USSR

- (Soviet Union) Sergey Dmitriev
- (Soviet Union) Viktor Shishkin
- (Soviet Union) Yevgeni Sidorov
- (Russia) Sergei Kolotovkin
- (Russia) Aleksei Kosolapov
- (Russia) Sergei Podpaly
- (Russia) Vladimir Tatarchuk

Former USSR countries

- (Armenia) Stanislav Buchnev
- (Azerbaijan) **Arif Asadov**
- (Azerbaijan) **Vyaçeslav Lıçkin**
- (Belarus) Andrey Chukhley
- (Belarus) **Pavel Radnyonak**
- (Kyrgyzstan) **Valery Kichin**
- (Latvia) Edgars Burlakovs
- (Latvia) Vadims Fjodorovs
- (Moldova) Emil Caras
- (Tajikistan) **Yuri Baturenko**
- (Tajikistan) **Ruslan Khayloev**
- (Tajikistan) Farkhod Vosiyev
- (Ukraine) Yuriy Hrytsyna
- (Ukraine) Ihor Kostiuk
- (Ukraine) Ihor Kutepov
- (Ukraine) Viktor Leonenko
- (Ukraine) Oleksandr Pryzetko
- (Ukraine) Dmytro Topchiev
